= Dark Circle Comics =

Comics imprint

- Parent company: Archie Comic Publications, Inc.
- Predecessor: Archie Adventure Series; Mighty Comics Group/Radio Comics; Red Circle Comics
- Founded: 1978 (first incarnation); 2015 (current incarnation)
- Country of origin: United States
- Headquarters location: Pelham, New York
- Key people: Alex Segura (Senior Vice President of Publicity and Marketing)
- Publication types: Comics
- Fiction genres: Superhero fiction
- Official website: darkcirclecomics.com

Dark Circle Comics is an imprint of Archie Comic Publications, Inc. Under its previous name, Red Circle Comics, it published non-humor characters, particularly superheroes in the 1970s and 1980s.

It was a digital imprint from 2012 to 2014, and in 2015, it was converted back to a print imprint and was completely revamped as Dark Circle Comics, featuring darker and more mature content than previous incarnations of Archie's superhero line.

The term "Red Circle characters" is also used to refer to Archie Comics' superheroes, including such characters as the Black Hood, The Shield, the Wizard, the Hangman, The Fly, Flygirl, The Comet, The Web, Jaguar, and the Fox.

These characters were previously published when Archie Comics was MLJ Magazines, then published under various Archie imprints: Archie Adventure Series, Radio Comics/Mighty Comics Group, Red Circle Comics and the Red Circle Comics digital imprint (2012).

Archie licensed their Red Circle characters to DC Comics in the early 1990s under the DC imprint Impact Comics, and then again from 2007 to 2011, when DC attempted to integrate them into the DC Universe. When this failed, the characters reverted to Archie Comics, which launched the imprint digitally. The company retired this in late 2014; the line was relaunched as the Dark Circle Comics imprint in 2015.

== Publication history ==
=== MLJ Magazines ===
MLJ's first comic book published in November 1939 was Blue Ribbon Comics, with the first half of the magazine in full color and the second half in red and white tints.

In January 1940, Pep Comics debuted with the Shield, created by writer and managing editor Harry Shorten and artist Irv Novick. The Shield was one of the first superheroes with a costume based upon United States patriotic iconography, first appearing 14 months earlier than Joe Simon and Jack Kirby's Captain America.

MLJ's Golden Age heroes also included the Black Hood, who also appeared in pulp magazines and a radio show; and The Wizard, who shared a title with the Shield. Top-Notch Comics (featuring, among others, The Wizard, Black Hood, and The Firefly) was launched in December 1941.

The Archie character soon dominated MLJ publications, pushing out the superheroes. For instance, at first, the cover feature of Pep Comics was The Shield; he and The Hangman shared the cover with Archie in Pep Comics #36 (February, 1943). Archie increasingly was given the cover until issue #51 (August, 1944), when he took over the cover permanently. The company was later (in 1946) renamed after the character.

==== MLJ superhero titles ====
- Black Hood Comics (Winter 1943-Summer 1946) - 11 issues; continues from Laugh Comics / Laugh
- Blue Ribbon Comics (November 1939-March 1942) - 22 issues; also known as Blue Ribbon Mystery Comics
- Hangman Comics (Spring 1942-Fall 1943) - 8 issues; numbering continues from Special Comics, and numbering continues with Black Hood Comics
- Jackpot Comics (Spring 1941-Spring 1943) - 9 issues
- Pep Comics (Jan. 1940-Oct. 1947) - 64 issues; becomes all-humor after issue #65
- Sam Hill Private Eye (1950-1952) - 7 issues
- Shield-Wizard Comics (Summer 1940-Spring 1944) - 13 issues
- Top Notch Comics (December 1939-May 1942) - 27 issues; numbering continues with Top Notch Laugh Comics and Laugh Comix
- Zip Comics (February 1940-Summer 1944) - 47 issues; became mostly humor after issue #35

One-Shot Comics Titles

- Adventures of the Dover Boys (1940) - 1 issues
- Black Swan Comics (1945) - 1 issues; Reprint for other MLJ Comics

=== Archie Adventure Series ===
Archie's Silver Age relaunch of its superheroes under the Archie Adventure Series line featured two new characters, The Jaguar and The Fly, as well as a new version of the Shield, inspired by DC's revivals of their 1940s characters. The Archie Adventure Series line debuted with the June 1959 release of The Double Life of Private Strong #1, by creators Joe Simon and Jack Kirby, which also introduced The Fly, also by Simon and Kirby. DC Comics' lawyers, citing similarity to Superman, forced Archie Comics to stop publishing Private Strong after two issues. Adventures of The Fly appeared two months after Private Strong #1 and ran for 30 issues under that title, until October, 1964. The Adventures of the Jaguar began in September 1961 and ran for 15 issues until November 1963. During this time, Archie Comics licensed the 1930s pulp character The Shadow, whom they portrayed first as a spy in a James Bond mode, before turning him into a costumed superhero. Archie's version of The Shadow ran for eight issues (Aug. 1964 – Sept. 1965). In addition, the Jaguar, The Fly, and his partner Flygirl appeared in issues of Pep Comics and Laugh Comics between 1961 and 1963. Much of the output during the Adventure Series period after the departure of Simon and Kirby was by writer Robert Bernstein and artists John Rosenberger and John Giunta.

=== Mighty Comics / Radio Comics ===
The Mighty Comics Group imprint (alternately known as Radio Comics) took over the Adventure titles in the mid-1960s as general imitation of Marvel Comics and the Batman TV show camp; Superman creator Jerry Siegel was brought in to be the imprint's main writer, along with Marvel Comics artist Paul Reinman. The shift to the Mighty imprint (which first appeared on covers dated January 1966) included changing the title Adventures of The Fly into Fly Man.

The first issue of Fly Man, #31, brought the company its first super hero team (similar to Marvel's Avengers), The Mighty Crusaders, made up of Fly Man, a newly revived version of The Shield, The Black Hood (who had appeared occasionally in Adventures of The Fly), and a newly revived version of The Comet (who had appeared a few months before in the final issue of Adventures of The Fly). The Mighty Crusaders spun off into their own title after three Fly Man appearances. The Wizard and the Hangman, who had been heroes during their MLJ publication, became recurring villains. In The Mighty Crusaders #4, many of the old MLJ heroes made cameo appearances. In November 1966, with issue 40, Fly Man changed its name again to Mighty Comics, which featured various Mighty super-heroes (The Shield, The Web, The Hangman, Steel Sterling, Mister Justice) in rotating solo adventures until its cancellation ten issues later. Similarly, the final issue of Mighty Crusaders was taken over by a solo adventure of Steel Sterling. The Mighty Comics Group line was cancelled in late 1967. Several stories from this period were published in the mass-market paperback High Camp Super-Heroes by Belmont Books in 1966 (Belmont was owned by the same company that owned Archie), which featured an introduction by Siegel, as well as in a 1966 deluxe special, Super Heroes Versus Super Villains.

=== Red Circle Comics ===
Red Circle Comics was launched in the early 1970s as a fantasy/horror imprint, but switched over to superheroes in the 1980s.

The line was first used to publish Chilling Adventures in Sorcery in October 1973, which for its first two issues was called Chilling Adventures in Sorcery as Told by Sabrina. With the third issue, the title was renamed and published under Red Circle Comics. The name "Red Circle" was based on the previous business that Michael Silberkleit's father had with Martin Goodman, with Gray Morrow as editor. With issue number 6 Chilling Adventures was renamed Red Circle Sorcery and lasted until issue number 11 (Feb. 1975).

Red Circle published one issue of The Super Cops (based on the movie of the same name) in July 1974. Shortly thereafter, Mad House (a re-title of Mad House Glads) was published under the Red Circle Comics line starting with issue number 95 (Sept. 1974). This ended after number 97 (January 1975), when the title reverted to being a standard Archie humor title.

In 1978 and 1979, Archie published two digests collecting their superhero materials from the 1960s. The first was titled Archie's Super Hero Special. The second issue was titled Archie's Super Hero Comic Digest Magazine, and is notable for publishing the previously unpublished revamp of the Black Hood done by Gray Morrow and Neal Adams. There was nothing on their covers to indicate they were Red Circle titles; only the interior indicia indicated the publisher.

In the 1980s, Archie made a concerted effort to reuse its superheroes. The first appearance was in JC Comics's JCP Features #1 (Dec. 1981), which reprinted the new Black Hood materials that appeared in Archie Super Hero Comic Digest Magazine #2. In March 1983, the Red Circle brand was resurrected with first issue of a new volume of Mighty Crusaders. That title lasted 13 issues and led to many new titles under the Red Circle Comics banner, including The Fly (nine issues, May 1983-October, 1984), Black Hood (three issues, June–October, 1983), Lancelot Strong, The Shield (two issues, June–August, 1983, before becoming Shield – Steel Sterling for issue #3 [Dec. 1983] and finally Steel Sterling for issues #4–7 [Jan.-July, 1984]), The Original Shield (four issues, April–Oct., 1984), Blue Ribbon (14 issues, including new material and reprints of older material; Nov. 1983-Dec. 1984) and The Comet (two issues of a three-issue miniseries, October–December, 1983). Though this 1980s incarnation featured Rich Buckler's work prominently, it also featured contributions from others, including artists Jim Steranko, Alex Toth, Steve Ditko, Rudy Nebres, Alan Weiss, Carmine Infantino, Dick Ayers, John Severin and Pat Boyette.

=== Archie Adventure Series revival ===
With the February 1984 issues, the Red Circle line was renamed the Archie Adventure Series, reviving the name from the company's superhero line of the early 1960s. During this period, the company published, as either Red Circle or Archie Adventure, a comic-book tie-in to Remco's ManTech Robot Warriors toy line (two issues, Sept.-Dec. 1984), a Katy Keene Special (Sept. 1983), and an issue of Thunder Bunny (Jan. 1984). By September 1985, the entire line that originated with Red Circle had been cancelled.

In 1988, however, with Archie's acquisition of the Teenage Mutant Ninja Turtles license, the Archie Adventure Series returned as the imprint behind Teenage Mutant Ninja Turtles Adventures, which ran 72 issues until October 1995. In the late 1980s, Archie Adventure Series published The Adventures of Bayou Billy, based on a popular video game, and in the early 1990s the imprint published Mighty Mutanimals, a superhero team comic spun off from the Teenage Mutant Ninja Turtles.

=== Spectrum Comics ===
Archie planned to begin publishing superheroes again in late 1988, aiming at the direct market, with an imprint that was eventually settled on the name that was called Spectrum Comics in 1989, which was formed by editor-in-chief Scott Fulop, featuring a number of high-profile talents, including Steve Englehart, Len Wein, Jim Valentino, Marv Wolfman, Michael Bair, Kelley Jones, and Rob Liefeld. It also offered creator-owned comics in addition to non-Code approved superhero and adventure titles. Planned Spectrum titles included The Fly, The Fox, Hangman, Jaguar, Mister Justice, and The Shield. Ultimately, Archie cancelled Spectrum Comics on July 11, 1989 before publishing a single issue.

=== DC Comics licensing ===
==== Impact Comics ====
DC Comics licensed the Red Circle characters and revamped them for publishing under the Impact Comics imprint from 1991 to 1992. This attempt also included a super team, called simply "The Crusaders". The stories in the line were set their own shared universe, unrelated to previous incarnations of the characters or to DC's own fictional universe.

==== Red Circle line ====
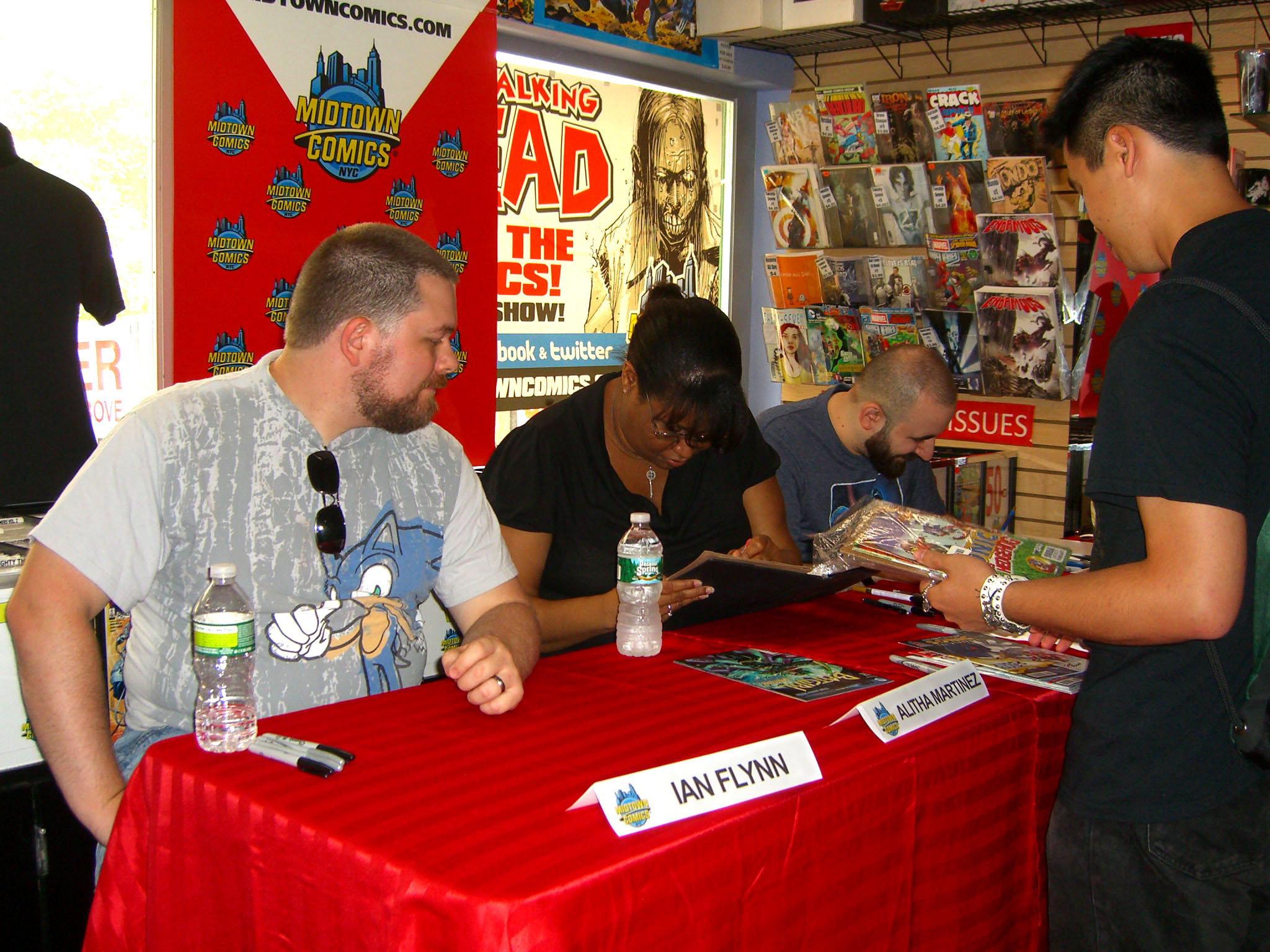
Ian Flynn, Alitha Martinez and Ryan Jampole at a September 8, 2012 signing for New Crusaders No. 1 at Midtown Comics in Manhattan.

DC was granted the license to the Red Circle characters in 2008. DC planned to inject the characters into the DC Universe and tapped writer J. Michael Straczynski. The line folded in late 2010. In July 2011, it was revealed that DC no longer had the rights to them.

=== Red Circle digital imprint ===
Logo from 2012 to 2014

Archie Comics announced at the New York Comic Con in October 2011 that its superhero line will return as an all-digital line under a subscription model with back issues archive access. This was announced as the Red Circle line starting with the New Crusader comic in 2012. The Red Circle Comics app provides readers access to a new chapter of the New Crusaders comic, as well as the Red Circle library of comics from the previous 70 years for a 99 cent weekly subscription price.

In 2012, New Crusaders was followed up with Lost Crusade: Prelude, a free one-shot focusing on the lives of the original Mighty Crusaders which debuted on August 29 through the Red Circle Comics app at RedCircleComics.com. Ian Flynn had pitched the idea as "I was really excited by all the prospective stories to be told between the end of the '80s series and our relaunch... There were so many open endings when the '80s era series wrapped up that it's hard to choose. What happened to Darkling? Who was the traitor? Did Black Hood figure it out or just make things worse? Did anyone mourn Doc Reeves?" The first arc of New Crusaders was also printed.

Chuck Dixon was announced as writing the second story arc of Lost Crusade and New Crusaders: Dark Tomorrow was announced for May 2013, but neither were released until the launch of Dark Circle Comics. In July 2013, a graphic novel collection, New Crusaders: Legacy, was released. It picks up after the events of Rise of the Heroes, with The Shield teaching the New Crusaders about the early history of their parents, the Mighty Crusaders, through a blend of new and classic comic material.

A five-issue The Fox miniseries by Mark Waid and Dean Haspiel began in October 2013, with The Shield back-up strips by J.M. DeMatteis (who co-wrote Fox #5 instead of Waid).

==== List of publications ====
Title	Issue	Writer	Artist(s)	Colorist	Debut date	Conclusion date
New Crusaders: Rise of the Heroes	#1–6	Ian Flynn	Ben Bates and Gary Martin; Alitha Martinez	Matt Herms; Steve Downer	May 16, 2012 (digital); September 5, 2012 (print)	February 6, 2013
New Crusaders: Legacy		Various	Various	Various	July 2, 2013	
The Fox Vol. 1	#1–5	Dean Haspiel; Mark Waid; J.M. DeMatteis	Dean Haspiel	Allen Passalaqua	October 30, 2013	March 12, 2014

=== Dark Circle Comics ===
In July 2014, Archie Comics announced that the Red Circle Comics imprint would be relaunched as Dark Circle Comics in early 2015 with the past continuity removed. Tales will be self-contained, five-issue story arcs in ongoing series.

The Black Hood debuted in February 2015, followed by The Fox, continuing from the digital Red Circle line in April 2015. Later that same year, Archie Comics release two one-shots featuring the Red Circle Comics versions of the characters, but released under the Dark Circle Comics brand. The Dark Tomorrow Special resolves the cliffhanger ending of New Crusaders: Rise of the Heroes, while also moving the characters into the Dark Circle Universe.

After being delayed, The Shield debuted in October 2015. An exclusive digital graphic novel, Sam Hill: In The Crosshairs, was released in October 2015 featuring former NYPD detective Sam Hill. A fourth series, The Hangman, debuted in November 2015.

In July 2015, Archie Comics announced a revamped version of its 1940s character the Web would debut the following year. The announced series never materialised. In November 2017, the publisher announced The Mighty Crusaders, written by Ian Flynn and pencilled/inked by Kelsey Shannon, to debut that December. The four-issue miniseries features the return of Victoria Adams from The Shield and the Dark Circle Universe debuts of Jaguar, The Comet, Steel Sterling, Firefly, and Darkling. The Dark Circle Comics imprint and the universe were abandoned in March 2018 after the completion of the four-issue miniseries.

==== List of publications ====
Title	Issue	Writer	Artist(s)	Colorist	Debut date	Conclusion date
The Black Hood Vol. 4	#1–11	Duane Swierczynski	Michael Gaydos; Howard Chaykin; Robert Hack; Greg Scott; Rick Burchett	Kelly Fitzpatrick	February 25, 2015	June 29, 2016
The Black Hood Vol. 4	Season 2: #1–5	Duane Swierczynski	Greg Scott	Kelly Fitzpatrick	October 19, 2016	June 14, 2017
The Fox Vol. 2	#1–5	Dean Haspiel; Mark Waid	Dean Haspiel	Allen Passalaqua	April 15, 2015	August 5, 2015
Free Comic Book Day 2015: Dark Circle Comics	#1	Duane Swiercynski	Michael Gaydos		May 1, 2015	
New Crusaders: Dark Tomorrow Special	#1	Ian Flynn	Alitha Martinez; Rick Bryant	Steve Downer	June 17, 2015	
The Mighty Crusaders: The Lost Crusade	#1	Ian Flynn; Chuck Dixon; David Tipton and Scott Tipton; Howard Mackie; Vito Delsante; Dean Haspiel; Tom DeFalco	Mike Norton; Ken Hooper and Rick Bryant; Sergio Cariello; Vicente Alcázar and Jim Amash; ChrisCross; Dean Haspiel; Ron Frenz	Thomas Mason; Tom Smith; Allen Passalaqua	September 18, 2015	
Sam Hill: In the Crosshairs		Tom DeFalco	Greg Scott	Art Lyon	October 9, 2015	
The Shield	#1–4	Adam Christopher; Chuck Wendig	Drew Johnson; Al Barrionuevo; Greg Scott	Kelly Fitzpatrick	October 21, 2015	November 9, 2016
The Hangman	#1–4	Frank Tieri	Felix Ruiz	Kelly Fitzpatrick	November 4, 2015	October 26, 2016
The Mighty Crusaders Vol. 4	#1–4	Ian Flynn	Kelsey Shannon	Matt Herms	December 6, 2017	March 21, 2018

=== Archie Comics one-shots ===
In March 2021, four years after the conclusion of the Dark Circle Universe, Archie Comics announced that Rob Liefeld would re-image the Mighty Crusaders with a four-issue series of one-shots, beginning with The Mighty Crusaders: The Shield #1. However, that May, Liefeld announced his departure from the project, after objecting to a variant cover being publicized by its artist that allegedly spoiled the end of The Shield one-shot. David Gallaher was then brought in to script a new story for the one-shot based on Liefeld's completed artwork. Despite the creative change, The Mighty Crusaders: The Shield #1 officially sold out at Diamond Comic Distributors.

After revamping The Fox for Red Circle Comics, and later Dark Circle Comics, Dean Haspiel returned to script a new one-shot titled The Fox: Family Values, published in May 2022. That November, Archie Comics released the one-shot Bob Phantom, which re-imagined the superhero's alter ego, Walt Whitney, as a struggling journalist who daydreams of a secret adventurous life.

In November 2023, Archie Comics rebooted the Red Circle superhero, Darkling (Darla Lang), with a one-shot by Sarah Kuhn and Carola Borelli. In February 2024, writer Keryl Brown Ahmed and artist Tango re-introduced readers to The Jaguar (Ivette Velez), who previously appeared in the 2012 mini-series, New Crusaders, in the one-shot The Jaguar. The first Jaguar, Ralph Hardy, also made a special appearance in the one-shot comic.

The sixth and, as of October 2026, final one-shot from Archie Comics is Kardak the Mystic. The one-shot was greenlit by the publisher following Kardak's appearance in the 2022 Archie Horror one-shot Jinx: Grim Fairy Tales by Joe Corallo. Corallo was invited back to tell a new origin story for Kardak with artist Butch K. Mapa, which was published in August 2024.

==== List of one-shots ====
Title	Writer	Artist(s)	Colorist	Debut date
The Mighty Crusaders: The Shield #1	David Gallaher	Rob Liefeld		June 30, 2021
The Fox: Family Values #1	Dean Haspiel; Vito Delsante	Dean Haspiel; Richard Ortiz	Matt Herms	May 18, 2022
Bob Phantom #1	James III	Richard Ortiz and Juan Bobillo	Glenn Whitmore	November 30, 2022
Darkling #1	Sarah Kuhn	Carola Borelli	Ellie Wright	November 22, 2023
The Jaguar #1	Keryl Brown Ahmed	Tango	Ellie Wright	February 21, 2024
Kardak the Mystic #1	Joe Corallo	Butch K. Mapa	Ellie Wright	August 14, 2024

== Characters ==
- Black Hood (Matthew Burland)
- Black Hood (Greg Hettinger)
- Black Jack
- Bob Phantom (Walt Whitney)
- Captain Commando
- The Comet
- Darkling (Darla Lang)
- Fireball
- Firefly
- The Fly/Fly-Man
- Flygirl
- The Fox
- The Fox (Paul Patton Jr.)
- The Hangman
- The Jaguar (Ralph Hardy)
- The Jaguar (Ivette Velez)
- Mighty Crusaders
- Mister Justice
- Sam Hill
- Shield (Joe Higgins)
- Shield (Lancelot Strong)
- Shield (Victoria Adams)
- Steel Sterling
- The Web (John Raymond)
- The Web (Jane Raymond)
- Wizard
- Doc Reeves

== See also ==
- List of Archie Comics imprint publications
