= Black Hood Comics =

American anthology comic book

- Cover to Black Hood Comics #12

Publication information
- Publisher: MLJ Magazines Inc
- Schedule: Quarterly
- Format: Ongoing series
- Publication date: Winter 1943 – Summer 1946
- No. of issues: 11
- Main character: Black Hood

Creative team
- Artist(s): Raymond Kinstler; Bill Vigoda; Harry Sahle; Clem Weisbecker

Black Hood Comics is the name of an American anthology comic book series published by MLJ Magazines Inc., more commonly known as MLJ Comics, for eleven issues between Winter 1943 and Summer 1946. The series featured MLJs costumed hero Black Hood, and "Boy Buddies", featuring Shield's partner 'Dusty the Boy Detective' and Wizard's side-kick 'Roy the Superboy', together with humor strips.

== Publication history ==
Black Hood Comics was published by MLJ Magazines Inc., the precursor to what became the publisher Archie Comics. The title continued directly on from Hangman Comics, starting from issue #9 (Winter 1943), with a 68-page issue featuring new stories of the costumed hero Black Hood replacing Hangman, and a continuation of the "Boy Buddies" series featuring Shield's partner 'Dusty the Boy Detective' and Wizard's side-kick 'Roy the Superboy' The series was edited by Harry Shorten.

The feature character throughout the series was the titular Black Hood, a masked hero who first appeared in Top-Notch Comics #9 (October 1940). Black Hood appeared in four stories in each issue of Black Hood Comics to begin with, and most issues also carried a Black Hood text story, something all comic books did through the early 1960s, to satisfy U.S. Postal Service requirements for magazine rates. The stories were drawn by a number of artists, including Clem Weisbecker, Bob Fujutani, Bill Vigoda, Irv Novick, Al Fagaly and Raymond Kinstler.

Issues #9 (Winter 1943) and #11 (Summer 1944) also starring "Boy Buddies", the Shield's partner 'Dusty the Boy Detective' and the Wizard's side-kick 'Roy the Superboy' in a dual adventure with art by Bill Vigoda, while issue #10 (Spring 1944) featured a Dusty the Boy Detective solo story, also by Bill Vigoda. The "Junior Flying Corps Club" pages were also continued from Hangman Comics, with plans for making model gliders in issues #9-13, but with issue #14 (Spring 1945) the Club page disappeared, replaced by a true-facts page entitled 'World of Wonder'.

From issue #10 (Spring 1944) the series dropped to 52-page issues, and with #12 (Fall 1944) the number of Black Hood stories was reduced to three, with a war adventure series "The Flying Dragons" taking up the extra space in #12-13, followed by "Gloomy Gus the Homeless Ghost" by Red Holmdale from #14-19. "Bentley of Scotland Yard" (who previously had a long-running series in Pep Comics) had one story in #14 (Spring 1945) by Joe Blair and artist Paul Reinman, while the animal humor strip "It shouldn't happen to a dog" by Burton Geller completed issues #16-17.

Issues #18-19 of Black Hood Comics were published under MLJs new title, the Archie Comic Publications imprint; although the covers featured the 'An Archie Magazine' logo instead of 'An MLJ Comic' from issue #16 (Fall 1945). For the last issue of Black Hood Comics, #19 (Summer 1946), there were only two Black Hood tales, the 14-page "The Black Hood versus NeedleNoodle" and a 19-page finale, "NeedleNoodle Strikes Back", both drawn by Irv Novick.

Following MLJs new editorial direction towards teen humor comics after the success of Archie Andrews, from issue #20 (Fall 1946) Black Hood Comics was retitled Laugh Comics and became an all-humor title. Black Hood made two further appearances in the next year, in Pep Comics, while "Gloomy Gus" moved to the same title for a long run as Pep Comics also went to an all-humor theme.
