= Madam Satan (character) =

- The Pep Comics version of Madam Satan.

Publication information
- Publisher: Archie Comics (formerly MLJ Comics)
- First appearance: Pep Comics #16 (June 1941)
- Created by: Abner Sundell; Harry Lucey

In-story information
- Alter ego: Tyra; Iola
- Notable aliases: Lucy Fur; Evangeline Porter; Lilith; Mary Wardwell

Madam Satan is a fictional character that has appeared as several iterations in Archie Comics under its various imprints.

== Publication history ==
The first depiction of Madam Satan was on the cover of Pep Comics #15 (May 1941), but the character only appeared in issues #16–21 before being cancelled to make room for a humor strip featuring new character Archie Andrews in issue #22.

== Fictional character biography ==
=== MLJ Comics ===
The first Madam Satan is originally named Tyra, a black-hearted woman who is engaged to a wealthy man simply for his money. When confronted by his parents, Tyra poisons their wine and drives their bodies off a cliff. However, as they are dying, they are able to tell their son what his fiancée has done. The son struggles with Tyra, who ends up falling on her own knife. He kisses her lifeless body and immediately dies. Her spirit is then summoned by Satan, who dubs her "Madam Satan" and makes her his partner. On his orders, Madam Satan returns to Earth, now as Iola, to wreak havoc on mankind through her fatal kiss. Much to Satan’s dismay, her plans are constantly thwarted by Brother Sunbeam, the spirit of goodness, who tries to capture her spirit in a bottle.

Madam Satan appears as a dark-haired beauty in her human form, but in her true form, she has a green skull face with skull-studded eyes. Her powers as Madam Satan include hypnotic control, teleportation, shape-shifting, and a deadly kiss.

=== Dark Circle Comics (formerly Red Circle Comics) ===
Madame Satan was revived for a second iteration, with a slight variation in spelling, in The Fox #1 (October 2013). Under the alias Lucy Fur, she is a MyFace spokesperson, though her real intentions are to use the social media platform to draw worship. She is exposed when a photograph depicts her true face. This version retains her Golden Age seduction tactics and appearance, though she also has red eyes and protrudes tentacles from her mouth and in place of her limbs.

She makes a second appearance in The Fox (vol. 2) #3 (June 2015), attempting to kill the Fox for a cash reward. It is revealed that her tentacles can also transform into young women so that they can seduce men. This version is killed when the Fox ties off her tentacles under a railroad track and she is hit by a speeding train.

=== Archie Horror ===
A third iteration of Madam Satan is introduced in the last pages of Chilling Adventures of Sabrina #1 (October 2014) and is the series' main antagonist. This version was originally a witch named Iola and was Edward Spellman's girlfriend until he broke up with her for Diana Sawyer. Heartbroken that he chose a mortal over her, Iola committed suicide by throwing herself into a lion pen, where the lions devoured her alive. Afterward, she found herself in the pits of Gehenna, a place in the circle of Hell reserved for suicides. She remained there faceless until she was accidentally released by Betty Cooper and Veronica Lodge from Riverdale.

Upon returning to Earth, Madam Satan sets about gaining a new face before going to visit her former flame, who has since been trapped in a tree. Instead of freeing Edward, she decides to set the tree on fire, killing him. She then seeks out his wife at a mental asylum and vengefully clears Diana's mind of its insanity, knowing that she still will not be able to leave. After hearing that Edward and Diana have a daughter, Sabrina, Madam Satan makes her way to Greendale and settles under the alias Evangeline Porter, a teacher at Baxter High School, so that she can get close to Sabrina and continue her revenge against the Spellman family.

Consistent with previous iterations, this version of Madam Satan can project the appearance of a beautiful dark-haired woman, but is notable for the white streaks framing her face. Her true face still has skull-studded eyes, but does not feature green skin. Madam Satan's powers are also completely reworked, with her only having the abilities of a powerful witch.

== In other media ==
=== Television ===
Madam Satan appears in Netflix's 2018 Chilling Adventures of Sabrina adaptation as a series regular and is portrayed by Michelle Gomez. In this version, Madam Satan's alias is Mary Wardwell, Sabrina's favorite teacher and mentor whose identity Madam Satan steals. Gomez was cast in February 2018, when the character's surname was originally reported to be Wardell. The comics' backstory for Madame Satan is used by "Wardwell" in an attempt to mislead Sabrina; but it is eventually revealed that this version of Madam Satan is Lilith, the first wife of Adam from the Garden of Eden.
