= Firefly (Archie Comics) =

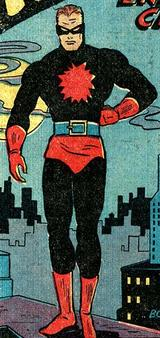
- Art by Bob Wood

Publication information
- Publisher: MLJ Comics
- First appearance: Top-Notch Comics #8 (September, 1940)
- Created by: Harry Shorten; Bob Wood

In-story information
- Abilities: Great physical and mental prowess

Firefly is a superhero created by Harry Shorten and Bob Wood for MLJ Comics in 1940. He first appeared in Top-Notch Comics #8. Artist Warren King and writer Joe Blair assisted in many of the Firefly's installments.

== Publication history ==
The Firefly was the fourth superhero launched by MLJ in the eighth issue of their title Top-Notch Comics. He was a mainstay in Top-Notch Comics until its 28th issue, when MLJ changed its format from a superhero book to a humor book.

The popularity of superheroes waned in the late 1940s. The Firefly has had very few appearances since, although when he did briefly reappear during the sixties in The Mighty Crusaders #4 he had gained the ability to glow brightly like his namesake. As part of the team the character reappeared in the 2000s Archie's Weird Mysteries #3 and 14 and Tales From Riverdale Digest #27.

== Fictional character biography ==
The Firefly's real name is Harley Hudson, an entomologist and chemist. He discovers that insects can lift masses greater than their own weight not because of the square–cube law but because of their ability to coordinate their muscles. He teaches himself to coordinate his muscles as insects do and finds himself able to perform amazing feats. He then dons a costume and calls himself the Firefly. Thus, the Firefly, similar to the Black Hood, another MLJ superhero, does not possess any real superpowers but is merely a man possessing great physical and mental prowess due to his natural abilities.

Hudson's romantic interest is Joan Burton, a newspaper reporter. Her occupation was common for female characters in MLJ comics. Barbara Sutton, the romantic interest for the Black Hood, and Jane Barlowe, the romantic interest for the Wizard, were both newspaper reporters.

His recurring enemies are Dr. Dread, the Mummy and the Dervish.

== Impact Comics ==
Firefly would also appear as part of the Crusaders published in the 1990s by DC Comics' imprint Impact Comics. The character was armed with a flamethrower.

== Dark Circle Comics ==
The Firely was a featured character in The Mighty Crusaders, first released in December 2017 under the Archie Comics imprint Dark Circle Comics. The series ran for four issues.
