= Shield–Wizard Comics =

- Cover of Shield Wizard Comics 1 (Summer 1940), art by Irv Novick

Publication information
- Publisher: MLJ Magazines Inc
- Schedule: Quarterly
- Format: Ongoing series
- Genre: Superhero
- Publication date: Summer 1940 – Spring 1944
- No. of issues: 13
- Main character(s): The Wizard; The Shield

Shield–Wizard Comics is the name of an American comic book series published by MLJ Magazines Inc., more commonly known as MLJ Comics, for thirteen issues between Summer 1940 and Winter 1944.

It featured the titular comics superheroes The Wizard and The Shield and their supporting characters throughout.

== Publication history ==
Shield-Wizard Comics was the fifth title published by MLJ Magazines Inc., the precursor to what would become the publisher Archie Comics. The series was edited by Harry Shorten. Unlike the previous MLJ anthology titles Blue Ribbon Comics, Top-Notch Comics and Pep Comics, as a spin-off from previous titles Shield-Wizard Comics was almost exclusively dedicated to stories of The Shield (from Pep Comics) and The Wizard (from Top-Notch Comics).

Issue #1 (Summer 1940) and #2 (Winter 1940) contained "The Shield - G-Man Extraordinary" strips by Harry Shorten and Irv Novick, and one single-page text story, six months after his introduction in Pep Comics and including his origin for the first time; plus two stories of a historical version of the "Wizard, The Man with the Super-Brain" by Harry Shorten and artist Edd Ashe; not the Blane Whitney version of The Wizard from the Pep Comics title but a historical ancestor from the American Revolutionary War period. The writer/artist team on The Shield changed to Joe Goggins and Clem Harrison from #11 (Summer 1943), while Paul Reinman took up the art position on The Wizard from issue #5 (Fall 1941).

From issue #3 (Spring 1941), The Shield stories became "The Shield with Dusty, the Boy Detective", and The Wizard "The Wizard with Roy the Super Boy", in conjunction with their other MLJ appearances. "Dusty the Boy Detective" also had a number of solo superhero tales in Shield-Wizard Comics #5-8 and #10 (Spring 1943). "Roy the Super Boy" solo adventures carved a more surreal path; his solo appearance in Shield-Wizard Comics #08 (Fall 1942) was a standard adventure/superhero-tale, but #10 (Spring 1943) involved a talking dog, while #11 (Summer 1943) saw Roy going through a painting into prehistoric times; in #12 (Fall 1943) he met his conscience and went to heaven, and he had trouble with a magic carpet in #13 (Winter/Spring 1943). Issue #9 also contained "Shield-Wizard Hall of Fame" - a supposedly true life heroic story of patriot Madge Colter, who worked in the Jeep manufacturers and supposedly saved the public from disaster at the hands of tire thieves.

Shield-Wizard Comics ended with issue #13 (Winter/Spring 1943), although The Shield continued in Pep Comics for several more years.
