= Grant Miehm =

Canadian illustrator

- Born: Canada
- Areas: Writer, Artist
- Notable works: Scouts in Action; Legend of the Shield; Manhunter; Ravage 2099; Suicide Squad

Grant Miehm is a Canadian illustrator who has worked for a number of different American comics publishers.

== Career ==
Miehm's work began appearing in the mid-1980s, in various titles produced by independent publishers, beginning with Elementals #15 (July 1987) from Comico: The Comic Company. Miehm cites various artists as influences but notes that: "I also think any creative person is influenced by everything around them --- so aside from artists whose work I admire, life itself imprints upon the psyche of the artist".

After drawing The American for Dark Horse Comics, Miehm worked for DC Comics from approximately 1988 to 1993, drawing for numerous titles including The Flash, Justice Society, Green Arrow, and Suicide Squad. He was both artist and plotter on Impact Comics' Legend of the Shield with dialogue by Mark Waid. Miehm has also worked on several Marvel Comics characters (Quasar, Namor: The Sub-Mariner and others) and The Avengers. He has drawn for television-related titles such as Disney's Gargoyles and Saban Entertainment's Mighty Morphin Power Rangers.

In 1999, Miehm began packaging the long-running "Scouts in Action" feature – writing, drawing, ink, color, typography, logo designs – as well as a variety of assignments for Boys' Life (now Scout Life) magazine. The feature was expanded to a second page – "More S.I.A" – with the September 2007 issue, with Miehm providing all art and writing for this page as well. The "Scouts in Action" franchise was expanded yet again – with Miehm at the helm on all creative duties – when "Scouters in Action" made its debut in the January–February 2015 issue of Scouting magazine, a sister publication to Boys' Life. This feature is devoted to recounting true stories of adult Scout leaders involved in acts of heroism similar to those seen in "Scouts in Action" and "More S.I.A.".

Miehm's other freelance work includes assignments in advertising and commercial illustration. He remains active as an artist and writer and continues his work and association with Scout Life magazine and Scouting America.

== Bibliography ==
=== Comico: The Comic Company ===
- Elementals #15, 18–19 (1987)

=== Dark Horse Comics ===
- The American #5–8 (1988–1989)
- Dark Horse Presents #24 (1988)

=== DC Comics ===
- Blackhawk vol. 3 #7–8 (1989)
- Dragonlance #33–34 (1991)
- The Flash vol. 2 #29, Special #1 (1989–1990)
- Green Arrow vol. 2 #31–32 (1990)
- Green Lantern 80-Page Giant #3 (2000)
- Impact Christmas Special #1 (1992)
- Justice Society of America #2, 7–8 (1991)
- Legend of the Shield #1–16 (1991–1992)
- Manhunter #15–24 (1989–1990)
- Robin III: Cry of the Huntress #6 (1993)
- Secret Origins vol. 2 #26–27, 30, 41, 45, Annual #3 (1988–1989)
- Starman #29 (1990)
- Suicide Squad #25–26, 32, 50 (1989–1991)
- Who's Who in the DC Universe #1, 5–6 (1990–1991)
- Who's Who in the Impact! Universe #1–3 (1991–1992)
- Who's Who in the Legion of Super-Heroes #1, 3–4, 6–7 (1988)
- Who's Who Update '88 #2 (1988)
- Young All-Stars #11 (1988)

=== Heroic Publishing ===
- Captain Thunder and Blue Bolt #5 (1988)
- Heroic Spotlight #16 (2014)

=== Marvel Comics ===
- The Avengers #376–377 (1994)
- Avengers West Coast Annual #5 (1990)
- Captain America Annual #12 (1993)
- Codename: Spitfire #11 (1987)
- Deathlok vol. 2 #24 (1993)
- Gargoyles #7–8, 11 (1995)
- Marvel Comics Presents #77 (Namor) (1991)
- Marvel Double Feature...Thunderstrike/Code: Blue #16 (1995)
- Marvel Super-Heroes vol. 2 #4 (1990)
- Nightwatch #7, 10 (1994–1995)
- Quasar #45, 49 (1993)
- Ravage 2099 #8, 10–21 (1993–1994)
- Saban's Mighty Morphin Power Rangers #7 (1996)
- Starblast #3 (1994)
