= Zip Comics =

- Cover of Zip Comics 1 (Feb 1940), art by Charles Biro

Publication information
- Publisher: MLJ Magazines Inc
- Schedule: 10–11 times a year
- Format: Ongoing series
- Publication date: February 1940 – Summer 1944
- No. of issues: 47
- Main characters: Steel Sterling; Zambini the Magician; Scarlet Avenger; Nevada Jones; Kalthar the Giant Man; War Eagles of the Devil; Captain Valor; Mr Satan; Wilbur; The Web; Ginger

Zip Comics is the name of an American anthology comic book series published by MLJ Magazines Inc., more commonly known as MLJ Comics, for 47 issues between February 1940 and Summer 1944. It featured a number of adventure, humor and costumed hero stories throughout the series, including the first appearance of superhero "Steel Sterling" and the earliest appearances of the humor strip Wilbur, who later had his own long-running series for Archie Comics.

== Publication history ==
Zip Comics was published by MLJ Magazines Inc., the precursor to what would become the publisher Archie Comics. In common with MLJ's other three main anthology titles, Blue Ribbon Comics, Top-Notch Comics and Pep Comics, Zip Comics contained a mixture of superhero and costumed hero adventure, mystery, war, detective and fantasy strips. The series was edited by Harry Shorten.

The feature story in every issue was the superhero Steel Sterling, drawn by Irv Novick and originally written by Abner Sundell and Charles Biro; later issues were written by Joe Blair. Steel is a chemist who dunks himself into a chemically-treated cauldron of bubbling molten steel, hardening his body and making him "the Man of Steel", a sobriquet not adopted for DC Comics' Superman until some years after this series ended. At the beginning of the series, Steel has a girlfriend named Dora; after a while, he acquires comic-relief sidekicks named Clancy and Looney.

Steel Sterling was supported by a number of other long-running series, the war adventure "War Eagles, the Devil's Flying Twins" (#1–27) by Ed Smalle, concerning two young American airmen who join the Royal Air Force to continue a feud with a German pilot who was their fencing adversary; "Captain Valor" 'the hard-bitten adventurer' by Mort Meskin (#1–26), who 'resigns his commission in the U.S. Marine Corps to seek adventure, because the Marines are no longer exciting enough for him' and heads for the Far East; the costumed crime-fighting magician "Zambini the Miracle Man" – (#1–35), called "The Miracle Man, Zambini the Magician" in issue #1 only, by Ed Wexler, "Nevada Jones, Quick Trigger Man" (#1–25), a 'cowboy Cattle Detective' forced to become a masked outlaw doing good in secret after being framed for murder; and the masked gangbuster "Scarlet Avenger" (#1–17). These stories were accompanied in early issues by "Kalthar the Giant Man" 'King of the Jungle' (#1–9) by Lin Streeter and the adventurer "Mr Satan" (#1–9) an 'International Detective and Soldier of Fortune' . Both these stories were replaced from issue #10 by the fantasy fairy tale "Dicky in the Magic Forest" (#10–26) by Lin Golden and "Red Reagan of the Homicide Squad" (#10–19). In the early Zip Comics there was only one humor strip, "Mugsy" by Kim Platt (#1-#6), about a dog who always ended up back in the pet shop window because of his escapades.

From issue #18 (September 1941) a new strip, "Wilbur", replaced the "Scarlet Avenger". Published four months before MLJ's most successful character, "Archie Andrews", Wilbur was also a teen humor strip that outlasted his home title, graduating to his own long-running series in 1944 after appearing for the rest of the Zip Comics run. He was soon joined by two other costumed heroes, "Black Jack" (#20–35) who replaced Red Reagan, and, replacing "Nevada Jones", "The Web" (#27–38) who was also the subject of text stories in most issues he featured in. Three issues during this period contained one-off supernatural tales, "Stories of the Black Witch", while "Zip's Hall of Fame" in most issues from #28–38 began with heroic stories of wartime American servicemen, but soon moved to the war exploits of a Russian female patriotic hero, Maria Baida, an Irishman fighting in China, Serbian guerrilla resistance leader Draza Mihailovic in issue #30, a 72-year-old female Serb Chetnik guerrilla fighter, Drina Cachalka in issue #34, and Russian military hero Marshal Timoshenko, although issue #33 (Jan. 1943) also contained the only "Zip's Hall of Shame", about German S.S. Obergruppenfuhrer Reinhard Heydrich.

Eventually, as part of MLJs change in editorial policy from superheroes towards humor comics, although "Steel Sterling" retained his place in Zip Comics, in issue #35 (March 1943) "Wilbur" was joined by teen humor strip "Ginger", and in the following issues MLJ replaced the other costumed heroes with further humor content, such as funny-animal characters "Chimpy", "Woody the Woodpecker" (not the same as the better-known Woody Woodpecker character), "Senor Banana" a comic strip with a continuing storyline, and country folk "The Applejacks", together with text stories of both "Ginger" and "The Applejacks". From then on until the end of the series only one other non-humor strip ran in Zip Comics, orphan Rueben Rueben, "Red Rube", a superhero who could call on the powers of his ancestors (who were all called Reuben Reuben) by saying 'Hey Rube' , and who replaced Steel Sterling as the star on the cover from his first issue, most in a humorous style instead of the war/adventure scenarios of the earlier Steel Sterling Zip Comics covers.

The series ended with issue #47, and has not been revived since. However, in August 2009 Michael Uslan announced that five one-off comics reviving the Archie-as-superhero 'Pureheart' concept would be released in 2010, one of those titles being Zip Comics.

== Series features ==
- "Steel Sterling" – (#1–47) many text stories also
- "The Miracle Man, Zambini the Magician" – (#1–35) "Zambini the Miracle Man" from #2
- "Scarlet Avenger" – (#1–17)
- "Nevada Jones, Cattle Detective" – (#1–25) "Nevada Jones, Quick Trigger Man" from #2
- "Kalthar the Giant Man" – (#1–9)
- "War Eagles, the Devil's Flying Twins" – (#1–27)
- "Captain Valor" – (#1–26)
- "Mr Satan" – (#1–9)
- "Mugsy" – (#1–6)
- "Dicky in the Magic Forest" – (#10–26)
- "Red Reagan of the Homicide Squad" – (#10–19) "Red Reagan" from #18
- "Wilbur" – (#18–45) text stories also
- "Black Jack" – (#20–35)
- "The Web" – (#27–38) text stories also
- "Zoom O'Day" – (#30–32)
- "Ginger" – (#35–47) text stories also
- "Chimpy" – (#36–37, 39–45)
- "Senor Banana – (#36–46)
- "Woody the Woodpecker" – (#36, 37, 39)
- "The Applejacks" – (#36–38, 40–46) text stories also
- "Red Rube" – superhero (#39–47)

== Publication history: Other ==
A short-lived U.K. underground comix imprint cOZmic Comics, published by H.Bunch Associates Publications, issued an unrelated 36-page Zip Comics in 1973, featuring mainly strips by British cartoonist Edward Barker and some early Dave Gibbons artwork.
