= New Crusaders =

Publication information
- Publisher: Archie Comics/Red Circle Comics
- Schedule: Monthly
- Format: Ongoing series
- Genre: Superhero
- Publication date: May 2012 - March 2013
- No. of issues: 6

Creative team
- Written by: Ian Flynn
- Penciller: Ben Bates
- Inker: Gary Martin
- Letterer: John Workman
- Colorist: Matt Herms

The New Crusaders is a fictional superhero team and their eponymous title published by Archie Comics' imprint Red Circle Comics. A revamp of the previously published Mighty Crusaders title, New Crusaders follows the sons and daughters of the original Mighty Crusaders as they acquire their own powers and attempt to become superheroes. The series was written by regular Sonic the Hedgehog writer Ian Flynn and ended on a cliffhanger.

== Publication history ==
The first issue of New Crusaders was released digitally on May 16, 2012, through Archie Comics' Red Circle app, with print publication set to begin monthly on September 5, 2012. The digital release was part of a partnership between Archie and iVerse Media and the subscription also gave readers access to an archive of older Archie superhero comics.

The initial story arc, Rise of the Heroes, ended with the shock death of Fireball, a decision made to ramp up the stakes and to remove the most grounded character, leaving the others at a disadvantage. Editor Paul Kaminski also said this was in response to reader feedback: "They've said, "This is awesome, but give us more action. Give us more realism in there." That's what we're doing."

During the first storyline, Archie announced a spinoff called Lost Crusade which would run every fifth week and fill in the gaps between the 1980s Red Circle comics & New Crusaders; the first writers announced were Chuck Dixon and Flynn. After six months, Archie went for same-day print and digital releases and Paul Kaminski announced the second arc: "we’re going to be exploring just how deeply that hell has burned this team (pun fully intended), and just what in the world Brain Emperor is after. Or should I say, what in the world(s)?" Lost Crusade was announced as going monthly. Archie's co-CEO Jon Goldwater said the New Crusaders: Dark Tomorrow arc would start "in May" in a January 1, 2013 interview and two #1 covers were released. However, neither Dark Tomorrow or Lost Crusade(after the Prelude) would come out.

Incoming Red Circle editor Alex Segura mentioned "[I] have a great fondness for New Crusaders and the stuff that book aimed to do" in a March 2014 interview, but announced that Archie was not going to continue it: "These won’t be all-ages superhero books that we hope will appeal to older readers. As much as I love New Crusaders, it won’t be a direct follow-up to that. If you want an idea of what we’re shooting for, Afterlife with Archie is your best example. We see the Red Circle expansion as a continuation of the success of Afterlife." On July 10, 2014, Archie Comics announced another relaunch of their superhero line as Dark Circle Comics. New Crusaders: Dark Tomorrow Special #1 was released in March 2015 under the Dark Circle Comics imprint but still featuring the Red Circle versions of the characters.

== Characters ==
=== The Shield ===
The Shield is the only member of the original Mighty Crusaders still active in the New Crusaders. After saving his colleagues' children from the Brain Emperor's attack in the series' first issue, The Shield took it upon himself to train the teenagers to harness their parents' powers and become a new team of superheroes. His powers grant him near invulnerability and heightened physical abilities.

=== The Comet ===
Greg Dickering is the adopted son of the original Comet. His powers grant him the ability to fly, as well as the ability to emit destructive laser beams from his eyes.

=== Fireball ===
Alex Tyler spent a portion of his adolescence in juvenile hall due to his regular lashing out. His uncle, Ted Tyler, the original Fireball, had offered to help straighten him out when the Brain Emperor attacked . As his name suggests, Fireball's powers grant him control over fire. He was killed during the supervillain prison riot in #6.

=== Fly-Girl ===
Daughter of the original Flygirl, Kelly Brand stepped up to continue her mother's legacy. Using advanced technology, she possesses heightened physical abilities, flight, and a projectile stun gun.

=== Jaguar ===
Ivette Velez spent her whole life in an orphanage after her parents died when she was still a baby. While there, Ralph Hardy, the original Jaguar, took her under his wing as her mentor. Jaguar's animalistic powers originate in the mystical jaguar helmet that Ralph discovered for her.

=== Steel Sterling ===
Johnny Sterling is the son of the original Steel Sterling and Mayor of Red Circle, Jack Sterling. His powers, including super strength and near invulnerability, come from skin made from a nanobot framework.

=== The Web ===
Wyatt Raymond is the son of the original Web and Powgirl. Wyatt possesses a "Strand Sense," which allows him to see shining blue connections between people. Wyatt wears technologically advanced suit to amplify his physical abilities.
