= Shield (comics) =

Shield, in comics, may refer to:

- S.H.I.E.L.D., the Marvel Comics organization
  - S.H.I.E.L.D. (comic book), a Marvel Comics ongoing series by Jonathan Hickman
- Shield (Archie Comics), a number of characters who appeared in Archie and Impact Comics publications
- The Shield: Spotlight, a comic book adaptation of the TV series and published by IDW Publishing

== See also ==
- Captain America's shield, the main weapon of Captain America
- Blue Shield (character), a Marvel Comics superhero
- Deathshield, a Marvel Comics supervillain, trained by the Taskmaster to be the Captain America equivalent in an evil version of the Avengers
- Eyeshield 21, a manga distributed in North America by Viz Comics
- Heavenshield, an OEL manga from Tokyopop
