= Inferno (comics) =

Inferno, in comics, may refer to:

- Inferno (DC Comics), a character from the DC Comics series Legion of Super-Heroes
  - Inferno (Mighty Crusaders), a character from DC's time leasing the Mighty Crusaders licence
- Inferno, the name of an alternate version of Legion of Super-Heroes member Sun Boy
- Inferno (Marvel Comics), a 1989 storyline between Marvel Comics titles in which the X-Men battled demons
- Inferno, a number of characters in Marvel Comics:
  - Inferno (demon), the name of a demon in appearing in Marvel Comics as an enemy of Ghost Rider
  - Inferno (Joseph Conroy), an opponent of the Avengers
  - Inferno (Samantha McGee), a member of the Exemplars
  - Inferno (Dante Pertuz), an Inhuman with the ability to light himself aflame
- Inferno!, a Warhammer anthology magazine mixing text and comic stories
- "Inferno", a Judge Dredd story written by Grant Morrison
- Inferno (Caliber Comics), a title from Caliber Comics
- Inferno (Image Comics), a character from Image Comics and member of the Vicious Circle

== See also ==
- Inferno (disambiguation)
- Armageddon: Inferno, a DC Comics storyline
