= The Fly (Archie Comics) =

Comic book superhero by Archie Comics

- Adventures of the Fly #1 (August 1959); Cover art by Joe Simon and Jack Kirby

Publication information
- Publisher: Dark Circle Comics
- First appearance: The Double Life of Private Strong #1 (June 1959)
- Created by: Joe Simon (writer and artist) Jack Kirby (artist)

In-story information
- Alter ego: Thomas "Tommy" Troy
- Team affiliations: Mighty Crusaders
- Abilities: Superhuman strength, flight, has all the powers of the insect kingdom, size manipulation, insect telepathy

The Fly is a superhero appearing in American comic books published by Dark Circle Comics, an imprint of Archie Comics. He was created by Joe Simon and Jack Kirby as part of Archie's "Archie Adventure Series" and later camped up (as Fly Man) as part of the company's Mighty Comics line. He first appeared in The Double Life of Private Strong #1 (June 1959); however, his origin story and first "full-length" appearance were in Adventures of the Fly #1 (Aug. 1959).

== Concept and creation ==
According to Joe Simon, the character was not originally inspired by a fly, but by a spider; the origin was similar, in that Tommy Troy found a ring that granted him spider powers. according to Simon, the character had provisional names Spiderman and Silver Spider. When the character was reworked and became The Fly, Simon reused the Spider theme by creating his first villain: Spider Spry.

Some sources indicate that Marvel's Spider-Man may have been inspired by this initial version of the hero. (Note: Ditko, Steve (2000). Roy Thomas (ed.). Alter Ego: The Comic Book Artist Collection. TwoMorrows Publishing. ISBN 978-1-893905-06-1. "'Stan said a new Marvel hero would be introduced in #15 [of what became titled Amazing Fantasy]. He would be called Spider-Man. Jack would do the penciling, and I was to ink the character.' At this point still, Stan said Spider-Man would be a teenager with a magic ring that could transform him into an adult hero—Spider-Man. I said it sounded like the Fly, which Joe Simon had done for Archie Comics. Stan called Jack about it, but I don't know what was discussed. I never talked to Jack about Spider-Man... Later, at some point, I was given the job of drawing Spider-Man'".) (Note: Jack Kirby in "Shop Talk: Jack Kirby", Will Eisner's Spirit Magazine #39 (February 1982): "Spider-Man was discussed between Joe Simon and myself. It was the last thing Joe, and I had discussed. We had a strip called 'The Silver Spider.' The Silver Spider was going into a magazine called Black Magic. Black Magic folded with Crestwood (Simon & Kirby's 1950s comics company) and we were left with the script. I believe I said this could become a thing called Spider-Man, see, a superhero character. I had a lot of faith in the superhero character that they could be brought back... and I said Spider-Man would be a fine character to start with. But Joe had already moved on. So the idea was already there when I talked to Stan".) (Note: Simon, Joe, with Jim Simon. The Comic Book Makers (Crestwood/II, 1990) ISBN 1-887591-35-4. "There were a few holes in Jack's never-dependable memory. For instance, there was no Black Magic involved at all. ... Jack brought in the Spider-Man logo that I had loaned to him before we changed the name to The Silver Spider. Kirby laid out the story to Lee about the kid who finds a ring in a spiderweb, gets his powers from the ring, and goes forth to fight crime armed with The Silver Spider's old web-spinning pistol. Stan Lee said, 'Perfect, just what I want.' After obtaining permission from publisher Martin Goodman, Lee told Kirby to pencil-up an origin story. Kirby... using parts of an old rejected superhero named Night Fighter... revamped the old Silver Spider script, including revisions suggested by Lee. But when Kirby showed Lee the sample pages, it was Lee's turn to gripe. He had been expecting a skinny young kid who is transformed into a skinny young kid with spider powers. Kirby had him turn into... Captain America with cobwebs. He turned Spider-Man over to Steve Ditko, who... ignored Kirby's pages, tossed the character's magic ring, web pistol and goggles... and completely redesigned Spider-Man's costume and equipment. In this life, he became high-school student Peter Parker, who gets his spider powers after being bitten by a radioactive spider. ... Lastly, the Spider-Man logo was redone and a dashing hyphen added".)

== Publication history ==
After the first four issues of Adventures of the Fly (Simon and Kirby left the title after the fourth issue), others took on the character and made him an adult lawyer who fought crime in Capital City. He was later partnered with Fly Girl.

Adventures of The Fly was cancelled with issue #30 (Oct 1964). The Fly also appeared in short stories in some of Archie's other titles (The Double Life of Private Strong #1 and #2 both published in 1959), (Pep Comics #151, 154, 160 and Laugh #128, 129, 132, 134, 137-139) between October 1961 and January 1963.

His own series was restarted as Fly Man as part of the "Mighty Comics Group", which ran from issues #31-39 (May 1965 - Sept. 1966). The title changed again to Mighty Comics, which featured various Archie super-heroes in solo adventures for #40-50 before its cancellation in 1967.

The Fly was published again in the 1980s under the Red Circle Comics imprint, running from issue #1 (May 1983) to #9 (October 1984). The stories in this series were more similar to the previous stories in Adventures of The Fly and co-starred Fly Girl. With issue #5, Steve Ditko both wrote and drew the stories, which portrayed Tommy Troy being framed and discredited. Ditko left the series after issue #8, and another writer wrapped up the storyline in #9, which cleared Troy from any guilt.

The Fly was one of the characters used in DC Comics' revamp of the Archie characters in DC's !mpact Comics line. This series, also called The Fly, ran 17 issues (Aug. 1991 - Dec. 1992) and portrayed the Fly as a boy (named Jason Troy) who turned into an adult superhero, similar to the original version of the character.

Archie Comics reprinted the first four issues of the 1959 series in a 2004 trade paperback collection under the company's Red Circle imprint.

In 1999, Joe Simon regained the rights to the character thanks to copyright termination. The termination did not affect Fly-Girl, since she was created after Simon and Kirby left the title.

With the post Infinite Crisis reboot of the DC Comics continuity, and the subsequent licensing of the Red Circle comics characters and mark, a newly revamped version of the Mighty Crusaders were introduced and came to be called Fly Man. Since Archie Comics no longer owned the rights to the Fly, DC couldn't use the character. Instead, they used Fly-Girl, his female counterpart in the original '60 stories.

Fly Girl has subsequently stood in for The Fly in Archie's 2012 New Crusaders series.

In 2007, the French collective and publisher Organic Comix negotiated with Joe Simon for a one-time publication of The Fly in the comic book Strange.

== Fictional character biography ==
Tommy Troy was an orphan hired by Ben (or Ezra) and Abigail March. Late one night, he tried wearing a ring with a fly-shaped emblem he found in their attic. The Marches were wizards, and the ring summoned Turan, one of the Fly People.

Turan explained that, ages ago, the Fly People ruled the Earth. They used magic in their wars, in the ultimate one of which they reduced most of their population to common houseflies. Only a few Fly People managed to escape to another dimension, where they waited for "one person... pure of heart" to fight crime and greed, which were their own downfall. Tommy was that person. By rubbing the ring and saying "I wish I were the Fly," he exchanged bodies with the other dimension and became a costumed adult superhero. To return to his own identity, all he had to do was utter his name.

The Fly was dressed in a predominantly dark green leotard with yellow shorts and belt and a yellow over-the-head mask. A pair of goggle-like eye pieces covered his eyes and a set of "wings" were built into the collar area. Originally the wings were small decorations; when the character became capable of flight, the wings became larger and somehow fully functional.

The Fly was one of the few 60's superheroes who carried a holstered weapon. The Buzz Gun, so named from the buzzing noise made when activated, was a handgun capable of dispensing non-lethal tranquillizer darts or stun rays, depending on setting.

=== Powers and abilities ===
During the start of the Archie Comics run of the character, the Fly possessed only four talents: the ability to walk up walls, to see in all directions, to escape from any trap, and acrobatic agility. Later in the series a string of insect powers were gradually added; in his final realization the Fly possessed whatever power the world's insects possessed multiplied times an nth quantity. Prime examples were: strength of a million ants, flight as fast as a million flies, durability, the power to shatter materials by vibrating his "wings" in chirping cricket fashion, webbing spun from the small of his back, bio-luminescent light and "heat", resistance to radiation and the ability to mentally control insects. Later in the series when actress Kim Brand was provided her own Fly Ring powers, becoming Fly-Girl, she possessed the same roster of magical insect-themed endowments.

Later both characters became capable of growing to skyscraper proportions or reducing to the size of an insect. These new powers remained during the rest of the Archie Series but were ignored during the Red Circle run.

== In other media ==
A TV series based on the Fly was in development at one point.
