= Fox (comics) =

Comic book superhero

The Fox
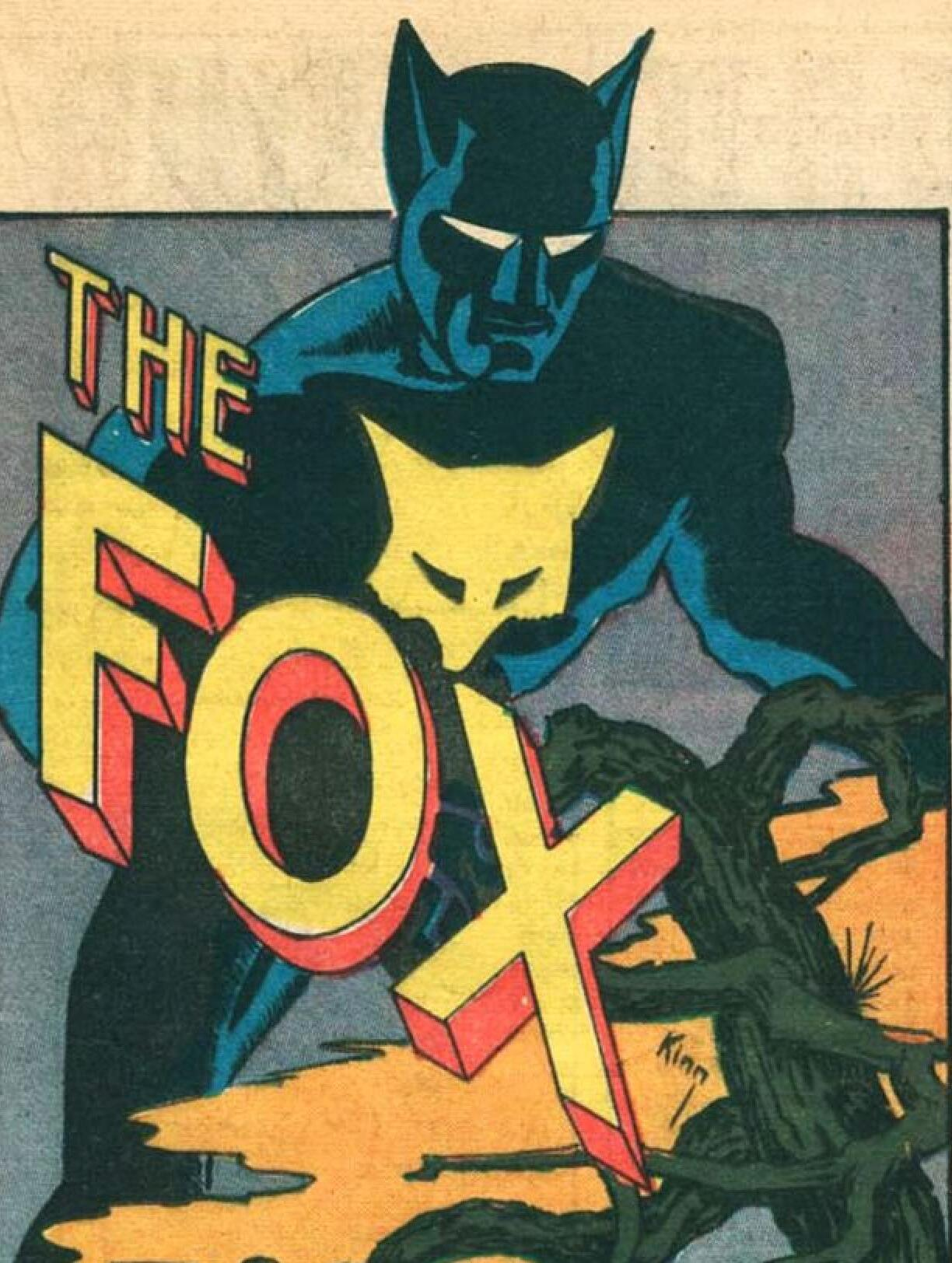
- The original Fox in Blue Ribbon Comics #13 (June 1941), art by Warren King

Publication information
- Publisher: MLJ Comics; Archie Comics
- First appearance: (Patten); Blue Ribbon Comics #4 (June 1940) (Patten, Jr.); Blue Ribbon Comics vol. 2, #6 (March 1984)
- Created by: (Patten); Joe Blair (script); Irwin Hasen (art) (Patten, Jr.); Richard Buckler, Stan Timmons (script); Tony DeZuniga (art)

In-story information
- Alter ego: Paul Patten; Paul Patten, Jr.
- Team affiliations: (Patten); The Ultra-Men (Patten, Jr.); Mighty Crusaders
- Abilities: (Patten); Highly trained athlete (Patten, Jr.); Skilled martial artist
- Cover to Blue Ribbon Comics (vol. 2) #6 (March 1984). Art by Rich Buckler and Rudy Nebres.
Publication information
- Publisher: Archie Comics
- Schedule: Monthly
- Format: (vol. 1); Limited series (vol. 2); Ongoing series
- Publication date: October 2013 – Oct. 2015
- No. of issues: (vol 1); 5 (vol 2); 5
Creative team
- Written by: Dean Haspiel; Mark Waid; J.M. DeMatteis (vol. 1)
- Artist(s): Dean Haspiel; John Workman (vol. 2); Jose Villarubia (vol. 2)
- Letterer: John Workman
- Colorist: Allen Passalaqua

The Fox is the name of two superheroes that appear in periodicals published by MLJ Comics and later Dark Circle Comics.

== Publication history ==
The first Fox (Paul Patten) debuted in MLJ Comic's Blue Ribbon Comics #4 (June 1940), in a story written by Joe Blair and drawn by Irwin Hasen. He appeared in that title until the series ended with issue #22 (March 1942).

He later made a guest appearance in Mighty Crusaders #4 (April 1966), as part of a crowd scene featuring nearly every superhero published by MLJ (the story, somewhat ironically, was titled "Too Many Super Heroes!"). He returned in issue #5, where he forms a team called the Ultra-Men with heroes Captain Flag and the Web. This was the sole appearance of that group. Some of the Fox stories from this period were written and illustrated by Alex Toth. The first Fox's final appearance was in Black Hood #3 (Oct. 1983).

The second Fox debuted in Blue Ribbon Comics vol. 2, #6 (March 1984). The Fox appeared in several issues of Blue Ribbon during the mid-1980s. He also appeared in issues 9 and 11-13 of Mighty Crusaders as a member of that superhero team. His final appearance was in Mighty Crusaders vol. 2, #13 (Sept. 1985).

In October 2013, Archie Comics released The Fox under its Red Circle Comics imprint as a five issue mini-series which ended in March 2014. The series was written by Dean Haspiel and Mark Waid, with art by Haspiel; backup Shield stories were by J.M. DeMatteis, Mike Cavallaro, and Terry Austin. The mini-series was later collected into trade paperback in July 2014 under the name The Fox: Freak Magnet.

The Fox returned in another five-issue series in April 2015 under the relaunched Dark Circle Comics imprint. Volume 2 had the same creative team from the mini-series.

The Fox returned in a one-shot titled Family Values released in May 2022.

== Paul Patten ==
=== MLJ Comics ===
==== Fictional character biography ====
The Fox is secretly Paul Patten, a young news reporter and photographer for The Daily Globe, and a former athlete at Penn State University. He has a camera that attaches to his belt. His editor and girlfriend is named Ruth Ransom. Patton's main reason for becoming the Fox was to further his career. As a crimefighter, he is the first on the scene with his camera. His first mission pitted him against the hooded Night Riders, a stand-in for the Ku Klux Klan.

Whenever dangerous situations arise, Patton quickly changes into his costume, which consists of a black, skin-tight body suit, complete with pointed ears and (in some adventures) a golden fox head logo on his chest. Ron Goulart says, "It took Hasen a couple of issues to realize a hero's costume is a fantasy thing that doesn't have wrinkles or baggy knees."

Although the transformations from photographer to superhero are never illustrated (artists favored a simple panel with the caption "Paul Patton becomes the Fox!"), it is assumed that the costume is worn under Paul's street clothes.

==== Powers and abilities ====
The Fox has no superpowers, but is a highly trained athlete.

=== Dark Circle Comics ===
Paul Patton is revealed to have been the original Fox who later passed down the identity to his son, Paul Patton Jr.

== Paul Patten Jr./Paul Patton Jr. ==
=== Archie Comics ===
==== Fictional character biography ====
The second Fox is Paul Patten Jr., the son of the original Fox who made his debut in Blue Ribbon Comics vol. 2, #6 (March 1984). His girlfriend is Delilah Monaco, who is secretly the She-Fox. Paul and Delilah are unaware that the other person has a secret identity.

The second Fox wears a black full body stocking with a covered face and pointed fox "ears".

==== Powers and abilities ====
The second Fox has no superpowers, but is a skilled martial artist.

=== DC Comics ===
In the wake of the continuity altering "Final Crisis" company-wide crossover, DC Comics licensed rights to the Red Circle and Milestone Media heroes, choosing to bring them into DC Universe continuity. It was announced that in March 2010, the Fox would appear in a back-up feature in the Shield comic book series, written by Brandon Jerwa and with art from Michael Avon Oeming.

Paul Patten Jr. is a film director from Seattle in this version.

=== Red Circle Comics/Dark Circle Comics ===
==== Fictional character biography ====
Paul Patton Jr. was raised as a child in the town of Beaver Kill where his father, Paul Patton, operated as the Fox. Patton took up a career in photography and eventually got a job as a photographer in Impact City. His wife, Mae Patton, operates as the She-Fox while his son, Shinji Patton, follows in his father's footsteps as the Ghost Fox.

Patton wears a black full body stocking with a yellow fox head emblem on his chest with a covered face and pointed fox "ears" as his costume.

== Collected editions ==
=== Trade paperbacks ===
Title	ISBN	Release date	Collected material	Issues published
The Fox: Freak Magnet	978-1936975938	July 2, 2014	The Fox Vol. 1, #1–5	October 2013–March 2014
The Fox: Fox Hunt	978-1682558867	September 11, 2018	The Fox Vol. 2, #1–5	June–October 2015
