= Comet (Archie Comics) =

The Comet
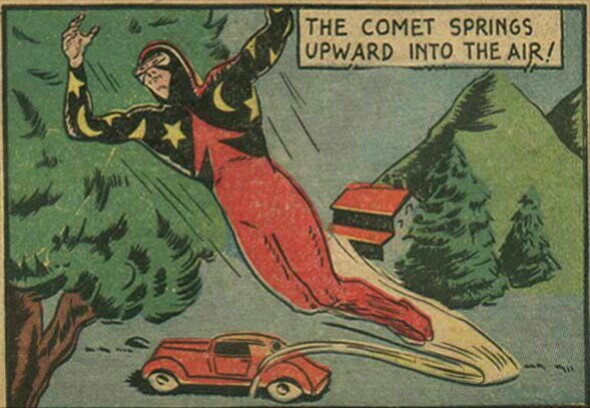
- Panel from Pep Comics #6. Art by Jack Cole.

Publication information
- Publisher: MLJ (Archie Comics)
- First appearance: Pep Comics #1 (January 1940)
- Created by: Jack Cole

In-story information
- Alter ego: John Dickering
- Team affiliations: Mighty Crusaders
- Abilities: "Dissolvo-vision"; Flight (originally merely superhuman leaps)

The Comet (John Dickering) is a character that first appeared in Pep Comics #1 in January 1940. A little over a year later, the Comet was the first superhero to be killed in the line of duty. He died in issue #17 (July 1941), which also introduced his brother, a brutal hero called the Hangman.

== Publication history ==
In Pep #1, in a story drawn by Jack Cole, young scientist John Dickering has discovered a gas fifty times lighter than hydrogen. By injecting small doses of the gas into his bloodstream, he is able to make great leaps through the air. After a number of injections, twin beams come from Dickering's eyes and when he crosses the beams, whatever he is looking at disintegrates. He makes a glass shield (visor) as that is the only thing his beams will not disintegrate, a weakness often used against him from the first story onwards. In the second story, tied up and unable to raise his visor to save himself, he smashes it against a rock, breaking the glass. Realising that such a discovery could wreck humanity, Dickering destroys the formula for the gas and uses his powers to benefit humanity. Despite the first page blurb, in the first story, Dickering flies rather than floats/jumps.

The Comet is remembered for his casual attitude to violence. In the first story alone, he callously disintegrates three gangsters and drops one to certain death. He kills more in Pep #2. At the start of issue 3, the police know that the Comet is Dickering, but they want him on the force, rather than try to stop his vigilantism. In that story, he comes under the hypnotic control of Doc Zadar and causes widespread destruction while Zadar robs places. He blasts two policemen, and destroys their police car. When he returns to Zadar, the Comet accidentally destroys him, too, breaking the hypnotic spell.

In issue #4, the Comet helps a young reporter named Thelma Gordon, and in her newspaper she reports all the good things that the Comet does to get him back in the public's good graces. In Pep #7, the gas wears off so Dickering loses his powers and he discovers he can modify his gas intake, rendering him human when he wants, so he can appear in public without fear of destroying people with his disintegration vision.

According to Jess Nevins' Encyclopedia of Golden Age Superheroes, "He fights ordinary criminals and Nazis, is hypnotized into committing crimes and has to evade the police, fights Stinger Lee and his blackout machine, the Master and his death ray, and the evil surgeon the Eye Thief."

In issue #17, the Comet was followed to his apartment and killed by gangsters as revenge for putting their boss "Big Boy" Malone in prison. He thus bears the distinction of being the first superhero to be killed in a comic. His death inspired his brother Bob to become a superhero, the Hangman, in his wake.

=== Revival ===
Despite his death in 1941, Archie used the character again over twenty years later as part of their Mighty Comics superhero line in the 1960s and their Red Circle Comics superhero titles in the 1980s. He was revived with a new costume and extraterrestrial origins as a (temporary) love interest for Fly Girl in Adventures of the Fly #30 (October, 1964). Thereafter, he became a member of the Mighty Crusaders beginning in Fly Man #31. His origin was repeated and expanded in The Mighty Crusaders #2 (1966), as well as in the later Red Circle Comics-published truncated mini-series The Comet (October–December, 1983).

=== Impact ===
DC Comics licensed the Comet and other members of the Mighty Crusaders, calling them simply the Crusaders, for its Impact Comics line. The Comet series from DC lasted for eighteen issues from July 1991 to December 1992, plus The Comet Annual #1. The eight-issue series The Crusaders ended the same month. Following the conclusion of both series, a six issue mini-series titled Crucible followed, featuring a redesigned Comet living in the ruins of his home city which he had destroyed. Crucible was originally intended to have been the start of a reboot of the Impact Comics line. This second phase would have included a new Comet title (The Wrath of the Comet), but this never came to publication.

=== DC Comics ===
In the wake of the continuity altering Final Crisis event, DC Comics once again licensed rights to the Red Circle heroes, this time choosing to bring them into their continuity.

A new version of the Comet is set to appear in the Inferno back-up story in the Shield #5, sporting a new design courtesy of artist Duncan Rouleau. This new version of the character has also appeared in the 2010 mini-series The Mighty Crusaders.

== Powers and abilities ==
The Comet - John Dickering - was given powers (including flight) thanks to "an experimental substance," and "soon decides to use his newfound powers in the fight for justice."
