= Mighty Crusaders =

Superhero team by Archie Comics

The Mighty Crusaders
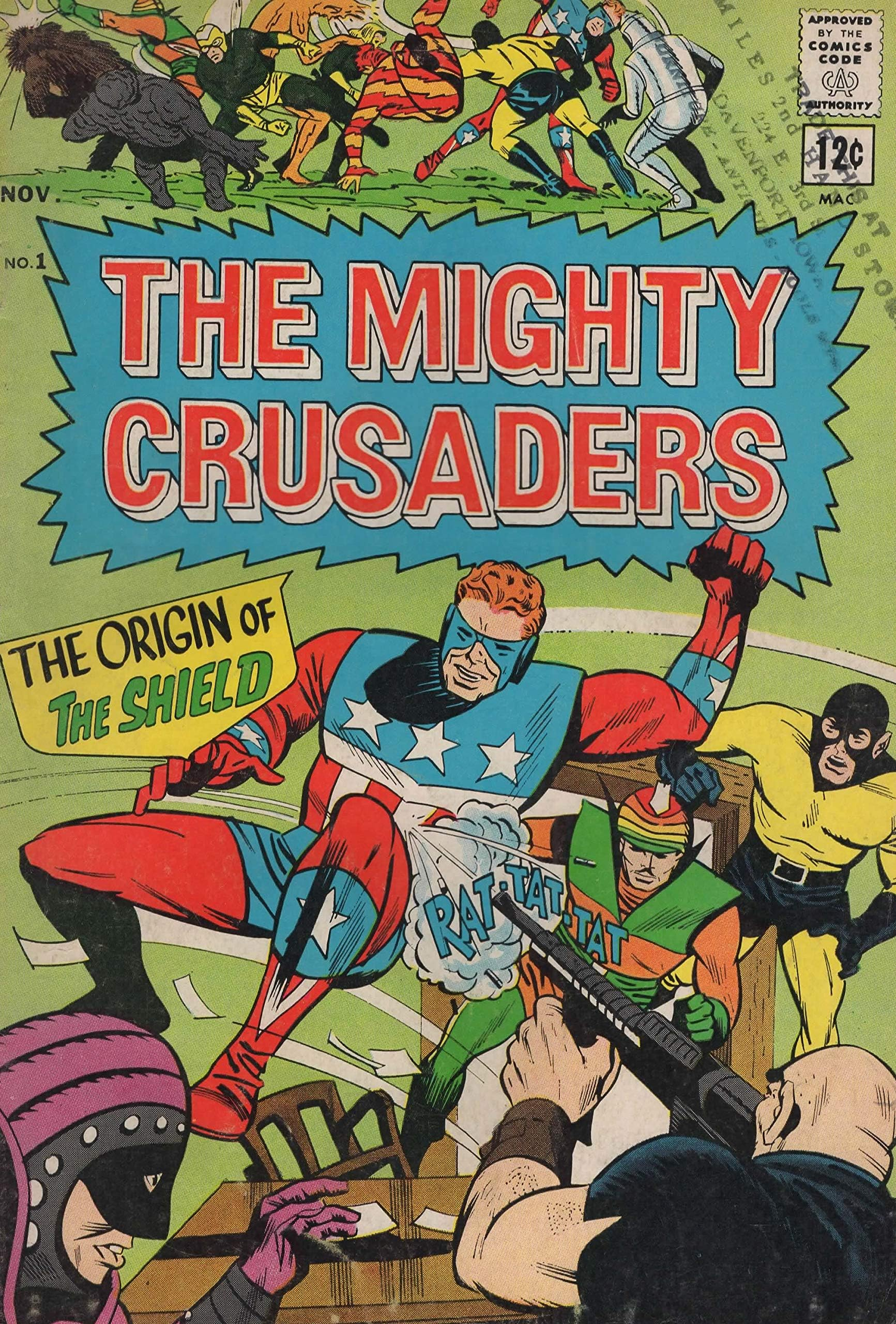
- Cover of The Mighty Crusaders No. 1 (Nov. 1965), art by Paul Reinman.

Publication information
- Publisher: Archie Comics
- Schedule: Monthly
- Format: Ongoing series
- Genre: Superhero
- Publication date: November 1965 – November 1966
- No. of issues: 7

Creative team
- Written by: Jerry Siegel
- Penciller(s): Paul Reinman; Mike Sekowsky
- Inker(s): Joe Giella; Paul Reinman
- Letterer: Sam Rosen
- Colorist: Victor Gorelick

Collected editions
- Origin of a Super Team: ISBN 1-879794-14-4

The Mighty Crusaders is a fictional superhero team published by Archie Comics. The team originally appeared in Fly-Man No. 31, #32 and No. 33 before being launched in its own title, The Mighty Crusaders. Written by Superman co-creator Jerry Siegel, the series lasted seven issues before being cancelled. The team was revived under Archie's Red Circle Comics line in 1983. In 1992 DC Comics licensed the characters and relaunched the team as The Crusaders, aiming the comic at younger readers as part of its !mpact line. This series lasted eight issues, cover-dated May to December 1992.

== Publication history ==
The popularity of DC's and Marvel's Silver Age superhero titles led Archie Comics to revive their own line of superhero comics. The Archie Adventure line began with titles centered on the Fly, the Jaguar, and a superheroic/spy version of the 1930s pulp character The Shadow. After suggestions and fan-art began suggesting a team made up of the characters published by Archie Comics precursor MLJ in the 1940s, Archie's superhero imprint, soon retitled Mighty Comics, re-introduced many of these characters, and brought them together in several issues of Fly-Man.

This team, which followed the success of the Avengers and the Justice League of America, was made up of the Shield, the Fly (re-dubbed Fly-Man), the Black Hood, and the Comet. Calling themselves the Mighty Crusaders, they initially came together as part of a plan by the Fly's nemesis the Spider to trap the hero. After appearing as a team for two more issues of Fly-Man, and gaining Flygirl as a member in the process, they spun off into their own series, The Mighty Crusaders, which ran bimonthly for seven issues. The Archie series mixed typical superhero fare with high camp. Don Markstein writes that they touched on "all the genre's cliches of the time", with Siegel's writing on the book being a "hokey rendition of Stan Lee".

In 1983 the team and the series were relaunched, with Rich Buckler as writer and penciller on the first issue. A contractual dispute between Buckler and DC Comics saw the publication of the first issue delayed. Buckler recruited Cary Burkett to write several issues of the Mighty Crusaders title. The series ran until the middle of 1985, being cancelled with issue #13 (September 1985).

In 1992 DC Comics acquired a license to publish the characters, and launched a team book as part of the line. This series, titled only The Crusaders, launched in early 1992. The first issue saw scriptwriting by Mark Waid and Brian Augustyn. The series and the line itself, Impact Comics, were aimed at younger readers. DC Comics attempted to sell Impact Comics titles through newsstands in an attempt to expand the potential market. However, due to internal conflicts, this distribution never happened and the imprint eventually collapsed due to poor sales. The last issue of the DC series was issue #8 (December 1992).

The team also served as a partial inspiration for Alan Moore's series Watchmen. Moore had initially imagined the story as being based around second-string heroes: "I wanted more average super-heroes, like the Mighty Crusaders line ... [the] original idea had started off with the dead body of the Shield being pulled out of a river somewhere." Moore used this idea when asked to submit a pitch for a treatment of DC Comics' then-newly acquired Charlton Comics properties. Although the treatment was rejected for those characters, DC Comics commissioned Moore to base the story on all-new heroes, and the project became Watchmen. Moore later used the Crusaders as inspiration for the Minutemen, the Golden Age predecessors of the Watchmen main characters.

== Team membership ==
=== First series ===
The first Mighty Crusaders group was created by Archie under their Mighty Comics line in the 1960s. At that time, the members of the team consisted of:

- The Black Hood – first appeared in Top-Notch Comics #9 (October 1940); revived in Adventures of the Fly #7 (July 1960).
- The Comet – first appeared in Pep Comics #1 (January 1940); revived in Adventures of the Fly #30 (October, 1964).
- The Fly – created by Joe Simon and Jack Kirby, first appeared in The Double Life of Private Strong #1.
- Flygirl – first appeared The Adventures of the Fly #13.
- The Shield – first appeared in Fly-Man #31. The Shield first appeared in Pep Comics #1 (January 1940), and was a cover featured character until Archie took over Pep a few years later. The character was relaunched in 1959 as The Private Life of Lancelot Strong (by Simon and Kirby), and appeared in Fly-Man #31 with trunks instead of the singlet style American flag suit as used in the original incarnation.

=== Second series ===
The second Mighty Crusaders group was created by Archie Comics under their Red Circle Comics line of the 1980s. At this time, members of the team consisted of:

- The Black Hood II (nephew of the original Black Hood)
- The Comet
- Darkling (later killed off)
- The Fly
- Flygirl
- The Jaguar
- Lancelot Strong, the Shield II (soon killed off)
- The Shield I (the original Shield)
- The Web II (the son of the original Web)

This title kicked off the Red Circle comics and lasted 13 issues.

=== Impact Comics series ===
When DC Comics licensed the Archie superheroes for their Impact line in the 1990s, the team was simply called the Crusaders. The DC series The Crusaders lasted eight issues, from May to December 1992.

=== DC Comics series ===
A new Mighty Crusaders series was released by DC Comics, which assimilated the Red Circle heroes into its continuity following Final Crisis. A series of one-shots led into two ongoing Shield and Web titles, each of which was canceled after 10 issues. Mighty Crusaders lasted seven issues. In addition to the established Red Circle characters, an original heroine by the name of War Eagle was introduced as well. The new team consists of:

- The Comet
- Inferno
- Flygirl
- The Shield
- The Web
- The Hangman
- The Fox
- The Jaguar
- The Black Hood
- War Eagle

=== New Crusaders ===
In 2012, Archie comics returned to The Mighty Crusaders characters. The new series, titled New Crusaders would pick up on the characters from the original series many years after the last of their arch-villains had been defeated. New Crusaders follows the progeny of the Mighty Crusaders as they struggle to become heroes after the return of the Brain Emperor. The series debuted digitally on May 16, 2012, through Archie Comics’ Red Circle app, with print publication scheduled to begin monthly on September 5, 2012. For digital release, issues were divided into fourths and released once a week.

A spinoff, Lost Crusade, was announced which would run every fifth week and fill in the gaps between the 1980s Red Circle comics and New Crusaders. Ian Flynn expressed a desire to explore the gap between the 1980s series and New Crusaders: "There were so many open endings when the '80s era series wrapped up that it's hard to choose. What happened to Darkling? Who was the traitor? Did Black Hood figure it out, or just make things worse? Did anyone mourn Doc Reeves? There's tons of stories and characters to explore, and it's honestly hard to choose." However, despite announcements for New Crusaders: Dark Tomorrow and Lost Crusade creative teams, the incoming Red Circle editor Alex Segura mentioned "[I] have a great fondness for New Crusaders and the stuff that book aimed to do" in a March 2014 interview but that Red Circle (later rebranded Dark Circle) would be taking a new path: "These won't be all-ages superhero books that we hope will appeal to older readers. As much as I love New Crusaders, it won't be a direct follow-up to that. If you want an idea of what we’re shooting for, Afterlife with Archie is your best example. We see the Red Circle expansion as a continuation of the success of Afterlife."

=== Dark Circle's Crusaders ===
Dark Circle comics started a new run in December 2017 featuring the new Shield (Victoria Adams), Steel Sterling, Firefly, Darkling, The Comet and Jaguar.

== Collected editions ==
Recently, Archie Comics has reprinted some of the Mighty Crusaders adventures in a trade paperback collection under the "Red Circle Productions" name. This TPB is no longer available, however, since Joe Simon successfully contested ownership of the character of The Fly/Fly-Man, meaning that Archie Comics is no longer allowed to use the character.

- Mighty Crusaders: Origin of a Super Team (reprints Fly-Man #31, #32 and #33 and Mighty Crusaders #1, 96 pages, November 2003, ISBN 1-879794-14-4)

== Other media ==
=== Toys ===
The Mighty Comics Superheroes Game board game was released by Transogram in 1966, and featured the Mighty Crusaders characters. Many of the characters featured on the box are given names they do not use in the comics (The Fox is "Mr. Fox", for instance).

Carded Action Figures were produced in 1984 for some of the Mighty Crusaders by the Remco Toy Company, featuring packaging art by Steve Ditko. Each figure came with a Secret Sonic Signaling shield. There were four heroes and four villains in the line. Included were:

- The Comet
- The Fox
- The Shield
- The Web
- The Brain Emperor
- The Buzzard
- The Eraser
- The Sting

== See also ==
- Crusaders (DC Comics)
