= Wizard (Archie Comics) =

Publication information
- Publisher: MLJ Comics
- First appearance: Top-Notch Comics #1 (December 1939)
- Created by: Will Harr; Edd Ashe Jr.

In-story information
- Alter ego: Blane Whitney
- Partnerships: Roy the Super Boy, Grover Whitney (brother)
- Notable aliases: The Man With The Super Brain
- Abilities: Supersensory perception Photographic memory Genius intellect that allows him to invent fantastic gadgets, weapons and vehicles as well as bulletproof costume that grants him limited invulnerability Telepathy; Hypnosis; Superhuman strength and acrobatic agility
Wizard

The Wizard is a superhero created by Will Harr and Edd Ashe Jr. for MLJ Comics, which later became Archie Comics. He first appeared in Top-Notch Comics #1 in December 1939, and was one of the headliners of that title until its cancellation in 1944. He was one of the earliest superhero characters to appear after the debut of Superman in 1938.

== Fictional character biography ==
Blane Whitney, a highly intelligent man, descends from a long line of men who fought for America in its wars. This includes General Steven Whitney, who was General Washington's chief aide in the Revolutionary War. It was later retroactively revealed that Blane was not the first Whitney to defend his country wearing the red mask and cloak of the Wizard during key events in early U.S. history. At age 14, Blane met President Woodrow Wilson, who told him to use his brain only for good and not for evil. While in college, he was a superb athlete and student. His brother, Grover, was chief of the Naval Intelligence Service and usually informed him of enemy plots against America. To aid him in his fight against these enemies, the Wizard had various contraptions and machines of his own design available to him, like a vibra-ray gun and a car that could reach up to 500 mph. He had several devices that enabled him to fly. Coming from a wealthy family, he also had airplanes and submarines at his disposal.

At first, the Wizard, similar to other MLJ superheroes like the Black Hood and the Firefly, did not possess superpowers but was merely a man with excellent physical and mental prowess. He eventually started to exhibit superhuman strength and a "Super Brain" that gave him a photographic memory and "supersensory perception" that enabled him to psychically "see" distant places, people and events, as well as a talent for hypnosis and telepathy. He also started consuming capsules containing secret formula F22X that replenished his super-strength. In his final appearances, however, he had no powers other than his clairvoyant visions.

In his early appearances, the Wizard wore a tuxedo and cape, thus he was similar in appearance to Mandrake the Magician (a resemblance made even more obvious by his dashing pencil thin moustache). At first, his cape and mask were white, but they were soon switched to a more striking red. During the Mosconia Invasion crossover storyline (which featured the Shield) where he was briefly blinded by an enemy attack, he developed a bullet-proof, explosion-resistant costume that consisted of blue tights with red trunks, cape, and mask. He wore this costume for the remainder of his Golden Age appearances.

The enemies of America that the Wizard faced in each adventure were usually from a fictitious country, like Jatsonia (in his first appearance) and Bundonia, but due to facial features or accents made apparent in speech balloons, these enemies were obvious, unflattering caricatures of Germans, Soviets, or Japanese.

Usually, after each adventure, the last panel would feature a note from the Wizard that read: "Our country / right or wrong / our country / The Wizard."

After several months of publication, the Wizard was given a kid sidekick named Roy Carter. Admiring the lad's courage when he saw the blond orphan bootblack leap to defend a mugging victim from several thugs, Blane took him in, clad him in a red and white striped polo shirt with a large blue-collar, blue trunks, white sneakers, and a red mask, and dubbed him Roy the Super Boy, training him until he had the strength of ten men. Roy would later join the Shield's sidekick Dusty in the super-duo known as the Boy Buddies.

Blane Whitney also had a girlfriend named Jane Barlowe who was a reporter at the Daily Citizen, a newspaper Blane had inherited from a murdered friend. She was often disgusted with his polo-playing playboy lifestyle but developed an attraction to his superheroic alter-ego, creating an odd love triangle that is quite common in comic books (for example, Superman/Lois Lane/Clark Kent, Hal Jordan/Carol Ferris/Green Lantern).

== Analysis ==
The Wizard was popular enough to receive a second publication alongside another MLJ superhero, The Shield. Shield-Wizard Comics first appeared with a Summer, 1940 cover date. He started sharing cover appearances of Top-Notch Comics with the Black Hood, an indication of waning popularity. Top-Notch was converted into a humorous publication in 1942, but the Wizard continued to appear in Shield-Wizard Comics until its cancellation in Spring, 1944.

Archie Comics, formerly known as MLJ Comics, revived its superhero line in the 1960s, but the Wizard, now with actual magical powers and corrupted by greed, returned as a villain with a long white beard and a new maskless and capeless outfit that befitted the evil sorcerer he had become. He fought The Mighty Crusaders, a team consisting of many old MLJ heroes, and at one point was confronted by both his former sidekick Roy (now re-dubbed "the Mighty Boy" for obvious reasons) and his heroic younger self who had been magically brought forward in time to stop him. In the 1980s revival, however, he returned as a red-caped and masked hero with no mention of his villainous period, although now with a purple skintight bodysuit rather than his original blue. Since then, the Wizard has been appearing sporadically throughout the Archie Comics titles on irregular bases.

The Wizard was apparently popular enough during World War II to have inspired a similar caped and cowled Canadian superhero called The Brain who had exactly the same moustache, superhuman strength and ability to visualize faraway happenings.
