= Impact Comics =

DC Comics Imprint(1991-1993)

- Parent company: DC Comics
- Status: Defunct (1993)
- Founded: 1991
- Successor: DC's Red Circle line
- Country of origin: United States
- Publication types: Comics
- Fiction genres: Superheroes

Impact Comics was an imprint of DC Comics that was aimed at younger audiences. It began in 1991 and ended in 1993. The initial "I" in the logo was stylized as an exclamation mark, but the official name of the imprint was not !mpact.

Impact's titles featured revamped versions of superheroes licensed from Archie Comics including the Fly, the Comet, the Shield, the Jaguar, the Web, and the Black Hood. Changes included making the new Jaguar a woman and making the Web an organization instead of a solo hero. This was the third attempt to revive the old Archie heroes, after the Mighty Comics line of the 1960s and the Red Circle line of comics in the early 1980s.

In an effort to reach out to kids who were not aware of the direct market system, DC Comics attempted to sell Impact Comics titles through newsstands, but that never happened. The imprint eventually collapsed due to poor sales. A final series, The Crucible, was initially intended to relaunch the line, but instead served as its finale. Archie Comics relicensed their superheroes to DC in 2008 before re-launching them as part of their own digital Red Circle/Dark Circle imprint in 2012.

== Titles ==
- Legend of the Shield (Mark Waid, Grant Miehm, Jeff Albrecht) - 16 issues and one Annual (July 1991-October 1992)
- Comet (Mark Waid/Tom Lyle) - 18 issues and one Annual (July 1991-December 1992)
- Jaguar (William Messner-Loebs, David Antoine Williams, José Marzan Jr.) - 14 issues and one Annual (August 1991-October 1992)
- Fly (Len Strazewski, Mike Parobeck, Paul Fricke) - 17 issues and one Annual (August 1991-December 1992)
- Web (Len Strazewski, Tom Artis, Bill Wray) - 14 issues and one Annual (September 1991-October 1992)
- Black Hood (Mark Wheatley, Rick Burchett) - 12 issues and one Annual (December 1991-December 1992)
- Crusaders (Mark Waid, Brian Augustyn, Rags Morales, Scott Hanna) - 8 issues (May 1992-December 1992)
- Crucible (Brian Augustyn, Mark Waid, Chuck Wojtkiewicz, Jimmy Palmiotti) - 6 issues (February 1993-July 1993)

== Characters ==
- American Crusaders (Shield (Roger Higgins), Captain Commando, Firefly, Doc Strong, and Black Witch) [1950s superhero team]
- American Shield
- White Hoods
- Black Jack
- Black Witch
- Bob Phantom
- Captain Commando
- Comet
- Crusaders (Shield, Fly, Comet, Jaguar, Fireball, and The Web)
- Doc Strong
- Dusty (sidekick of the original Shield)
- Fireball
- Firefly
- The Fly
- Fox
- Hangman
- Jaguar
- Shield (Roger Higgins)
- Shield (Joe Higgins)
- Shield (Michael Barnes)
- Shield Kid
- Steel Sterling
- The Web (now a group)
