= Paul Reinman =

- Paul Reinman c. 1964
- Born: Joseph Paul Reinmann; September 2, 1910 German Empire
- Died: September 27, 1988 (aged 78) Lake Worth, Florida, U.S.
- Areas: Comic book penciller, inker and colorist; fine arts painter

Paul J. Reinman (/ˈraɪnmən/; born Joseph Paul Reinmann, German: [ˈʁaɪnman]; 2 September 1910 – 27 September 1988) was an American comic book artist best known as one of Jack Kirby's frequent inkers during the period comics fans and historians call the Silver Age of Comic Books. This included the first issues of The Incredible Hulk and The X-Men.

== Biography ==
=== Early life and career ===
Paul Reinman was born in Germany and raised in Pfiffligheim, a borough of Worms, seat of one of the oldest Ashkenazi Jewish communities. The second of five children, and the eldest son, of real-estate agent and farm-produce broker Bernhard and his wife, he began drawing at age 3. By his early twenties, he was creating pen-and-ink drawings of such subjects as the Rashi Synagogue, which was destroyed by the Nazis in 1938. Emigrating, he arrived in New York City on June 15, 1934, joining an aunt, Johanna, who had come to the United States circa 1890, and a cousin, Willi, who had arrived in 1927. Reinman eventually brought his younger brother Friedrich and sister Emmy in 1936; their parents and Willi's brother Ludwig, an artist, in 1937; and his older sister Alice in March 1938. Another younger brother, Hans, remained in Germany, but eventually escaped and made his way to the U.S. in November 1945, and changed his name to John.

Reinman married Dora, an immigrant from Reichelsheim, a city near Worms, in September 1938. The couple had a daughter born circa 1944.

In the 1930s, Reinman entered the field of commercial art in New York, recalling in 1988,

My first job was as assistant to a designer of neon signs. Then the going got tough and I took any kind of job just to make ends meet, and I worked in the check room of an exclusive men's club on New York's East side … but luckily I had a chance to get back to art and I took a job in a studio of a match factory. Here I did designs of match covers and lettering. A few years later I quit and started to freelance in posters, fashion drawings, and package designs. Then I brushed up on my drawing technique and practiced illustration in many mediums. I succeeded in getting assignments for dry brush drawings for pulp mags, and following this I broke into comic-book cartooning.

=== Golden Age of Comics ===
This was at MLJ Comics, the future Archie Comics, the company for which he did his first comic book work in 1940. Because credits were not routinely given in the early days of comic books, a comprehensive bibliography of early creators is difficult to ascertain. Reinman's earliest known confirmed work was at Timely Comics, the precursor of Marvel Comics, where he penciled and inked a seven-page story starring the superhero the Falcon (no relation to the Marvel superhero introduced in 1969) in The Human Torch #2 (Fall 1940). His earliest known signed story is the 12-page "Plague of the Poisoned Jewelry", starring super-speedster the Whizzer, in Timely's All Winners Comics #2 (Fall 1941).

Also during this time, Reinman created or co-created (the writer is unknown) the superhero the Fireball in MLJ's Pep Comics #12 (Feb. 1941), the first known of many characters and stories he would draw for that company throughout the 1940s period known as the Golden Age of Comic Books. Reinman drew for such MLJ titles as Blue Ribbon Comics, Hangman Comics, Jackpot Comics, Shield-Wizard Comics, Top-Notch Comics, and Zip Comics, on such characters as the Black Hood, the Hangman, and the Wizard.

Reinman then began a long stint drawing for All-American Publications, one of the companies that later merged into DC Comics. He became one of the primary artists on the Golden Age Green Lantern (signing some of many covers and stories "P.R.") before drawing the Golden Age Atom from 1947 to 1949. In the flagship title All-American Comics and in All-Star Comics, Comic Cavalcade, Sensation Comics and others series, Reinman drew stories featuring those characters and others, including Starman, Wildcat, and Sargon the Sorcerer.

His sporadic later work for Timely included Human Torch and Sub-Mariner stories in Captain America Comics and elsewhere. Reinman went on to pencil horror, science fiction, Bible stories, war fiction, and other genres for Marvel's 1950s predecessor, Atlas Comics, starting with a seven-page horror comics story in Strange Tales #1 (June 1951).

=== Atlas and the Silver Age ===
Comics historian Michael J. Vassallo cites the Atlas war-comics tale "Atrocity Story" in Battlefield #2 (June 1952) as "Reinman's finest hour and ... one of the most challenging and intensely illustrated stories in the Atlas war comics line". Written by Hank Chapman,

"Atrocity Story" is not really a story at all, but rather a body of exposition in narrative form conveying information.... Chapman starts off with screaming headlines of brutal Communist atrocities done to U.S. and U.N. troops and unarmed civilians. He then draws comparisons to Nazi atrocities perpetrated by the Third Reich.... Paul Reinman renders this broadcast in newsreel fashion starting off with a magnificent full-page splash depicting a score of inhumanly bound and slaughtered U.S. Marines. The tempo picks up and using smaller and smaller panels, Reinman displays one atrocity after another. The panel-to-panel progression is swift and Reinman's art is crisp and starkly grim with dark shadowing in the inks. Page 5 is a disturbing eight-panel review of the atrocities on the Nazi concentration camps depicting dead camp victims and riveting single panels of hollow-eyed, skeletal survivors.

With the late-1950s return of comics legend Jack Kirby to Atlas Comics, on the cusp of its becoming Marvel, Reinman became a frequent Kirby inker in such "pre-superhero Marvel" science-fiction/fantasy anthologies as Strange Tales and Journey into Mystery, as well as on the espionage series Yellow Claw. After the advent of the company's first superheroes and its evolution into Marvel, Reinman would ink Kirby on numerous landmark books, including The Incredible Hulk #1 (May 1962), The X-Men #1-5 (Sept. 1963 – May 1964), and The Avengers #2, 3 & 5 (Nov. 1963, Jan. & May 1964).

In 1965, Reinman left Marvel and with Superman co-creator Jerry Siegel created The Mighty Crusaders for Archie Comics' short-lived superhero line. Reinman also worked with Siegel on that company's version of the Shadow, based on the 1930s radio and pulp magazine character.

The prolific Reinman's other work includes numerous issues of Adventures into the Unknown and Forbidden Worlds for the small American Comics Group (AGC) in the 1950s and 1960s. He and writer-editor Richard E. Hughes co-created the spy character John Force in ACG's Magic Agent #1 (Feb. 1962).

Reinman afterward returned to Marvel, where he remained active through at least the mid-1970s, penciling Ka-Zar #1 (Jan. 1974) and assisting John Romita Sr. on the pencils of The Amazing Spider-Man #132 (May 1974). He also worked as a colorist for the company during this time.

== Other work ==
Outside comic books, Reinman drew the Tarzan syndicated comic strip in 1949 and 1950, and the comic strip Merrie Chase in 1950 and 1951. He taught at the C. & I. Art School for one year. He had a number of exhibits of his fine art paintings in water color and oils.

== Personal life ==
Reinman married wife Dora (born April 18, 1912, Reichelsheim, Germany) in New York City on September 4, 1938. He was naturalized a United States citizen on June 10, 1940, with Dora naturalized the following year.

Reinman's sister Alice and her husband Alex Leopold moved to Boca Raton, Florida, in Palm Beach County, and Reinman, following the death of wife Dora in September 1967 and his leaving comics in the mid-1970s, settled nearby with his second wife, Celia. There, Reinman drew courtroom sketches for television-news broadcasts, as well as movie posters and advertising art. Reinman died September 27, 1988, in Lake Worth, Florida.
