= Pep Comics =

Comic book

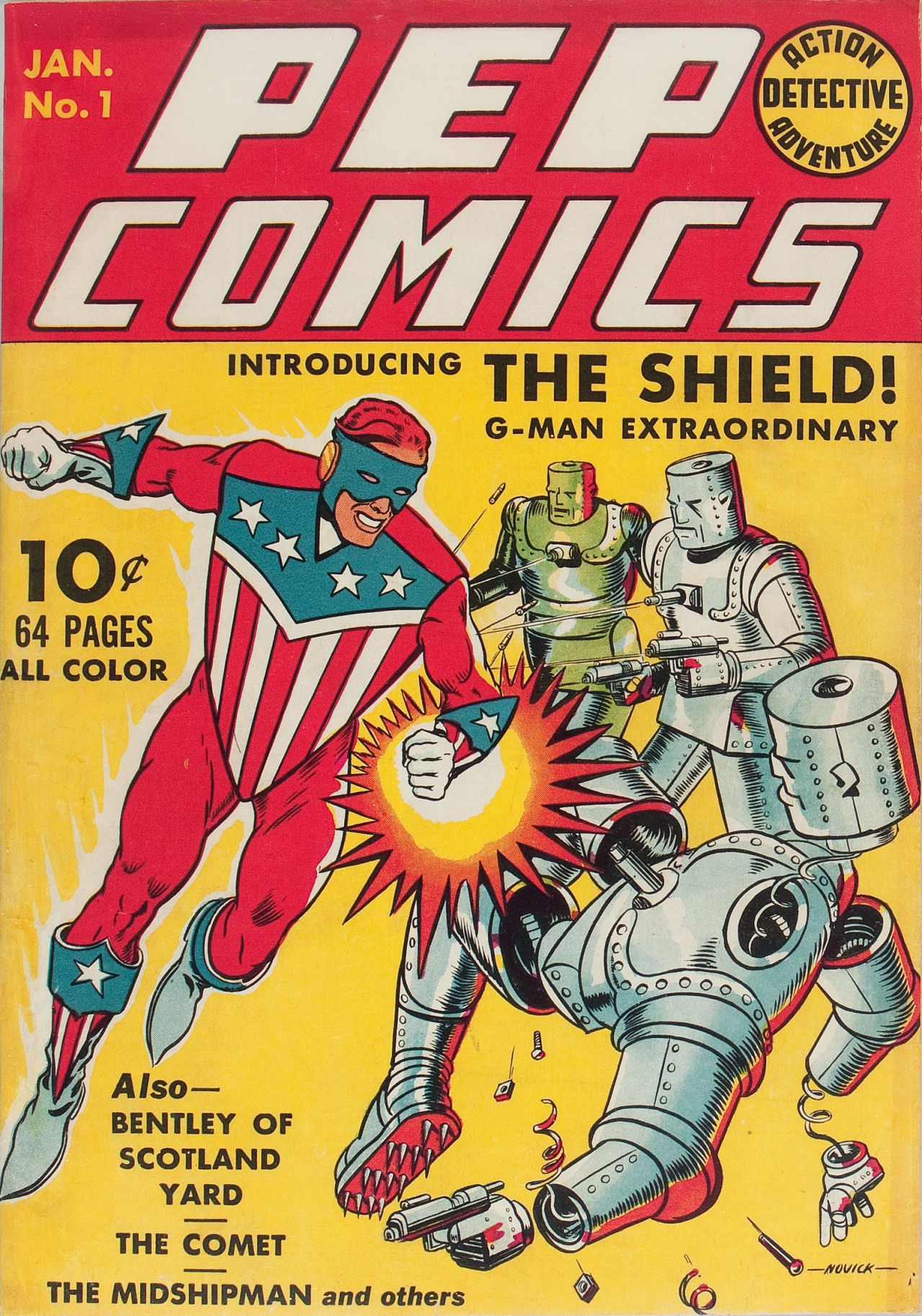
- Cover of Pep Comics 1 (Jan. 1940), art by Irv Novick

Publication information
- Publisher: MLJ Publications Inc.
- Schedule: Originally monthly, varied
- Publication date: #1 (Jan. 1940) – #56 (Mar. 1946)
- No. of issues: 56
- Main character(s): The Shield; The Comet; Sergeant Boyle; Fu Chang, International Detective; Bentley of Scotland Yard; Perry Chase, The Press Guardian; Lee Sampson, Midshipman; Kayo Ward; Danny in Wonderland; The Fireball; Madam Satan; The Hangman; Archie; Captain Commando and the Boy Soldiers; Black Hood

Pep Comics is an American comic book anthology series published by the Archie Comics predecessor MLJ Magazines Inc. (commonly known as MLJ Comics) during the 1930s and 1940s period known as the Golden Age of Comic Books. The title continued under the Archie Comics imprint for a total of 411 issues until March 1987.

Pep Comics introduced the superhero character The Shield, the first of the super-patriotic heroes with a costume based on a national flag (predating Captain America by over a year), as well as The Comet. The comic also introduced Archie Andrews, who eventually became the main focus of the company's extensive range of publications.

== Publication history ==
=== Pep Comics (MLJ) (1940–1945) ===
Pep Comics was the third anthology comic published by MLJ Magazines Inc., the precursor to what would become the publisher Archie Comics. The series was edited by Abner Sundell until issues #22–23, after which Harry Shorten took the reins until issue #65 (Jan. 1948). The first issue was launched in January 1940, following Blue Ribbon Comics (Nov. 1939) and Top-Notch Comics (Dec. 1939).

The format of Pep Comics was very similar to the previous titles; 64 pages of short strips, initially featuring a mixture of science-fiction stories such as "The Queen of Diamonds" (#1–12) by Lin Streeter (renamed "The Rocket and the Queen of Diamonds" in #2 (Feb. 1940)), about a John Carter of Mars-like hero trapped on another planet; the crime fighting story "The Press Guardian" (#1–11) by Jack Binder and Mort Meskin and later Abner Sundell and Meskin (retitled "Perry Chase, The Press Guardian" from #7); and three adventure tales, "Sergeant Boyle" by George Biro, about a soldier fighting with the British in Europe, as the United States was not yet involved in World War II, "The Midshipman", (#1–16) "Lee Sampson, Midshipman" from #6 (July 1940), following Lee Sampson through Navy College to his Graduation, and an adventure based on boxing, "Kayo Ward" (#1–28) by Phil Sturm. The last was similar to "The St Louis Kid" in Top-Notch Comics, both characters progressing through the boxing championships hierarchy throughout their series. Two short humor strips also featured in the first issue, "Jocko" and "Animal Antics", both by Dick Ryan, while "Buttonhead" by Quincy appeared in #2–5.

Pep Comics also starred superheroes and costumed characters, led by cover star and lead feature "The Shield – G-Man Extraordinary" by Harry Shorten and Irv Novick, a character who would remain in the title throughout the MLJ imprint and beyond. The Shield was mainly notable for being the first of the patriotic superheroes, who wore costumes based on the U.S. flag, 15 months before Captain America was introduced in Captain America #1 (March 1941). "The Comet" by Jack Cole ran for the first 17 issues alongside The Shield. The Shield and later The Hangman and Black Hood also featured in single page text stories during the MLJ years of the title; all comic books did this through the early 1960s to satisfy United States Postal Service requirements for magazine rates. The Shield also headed the Pep Comics readers club from #15 (May 1941), when the 'Shield G-Man Club' was introduced to the inside front cover of every issue, until The Shield finished in #65 (Jan. 1948). Although later to advertise other MLJ titles, during the war years each "bulletin" was largely filled with patriotic messages, details of local fan-clubs and new members information, all written as if a personal message from The Shield and his sidekick Dusty.

One unusual character who featured in early issues was "Fu Chang, International Detective", whose weird detective adventure stories were published in issues #1–11. Written by Joe Blair, with art by Jim Streeter, Fu Chang is a "Chinese scholar and detective, heir to the magic secrets of Aladdin who uses them only to bring peace and good-will to the people of his Chinatown." in stories liberally sprinkled with cod-Oriental talk, evil dragon criminals, and an aura of mysticism.

Another featured character was "Bentley of Scotland Yard", a mystery detective story originally by artist Sam Cooper and later Paul Reinman. Each story was in a horror/fantasy vein, with Bentley up against creatures such as a werewolf in #1, a monster in a lake in #2, and hunchbacks, devils and vampires through the first 41 issues of Pep Comics. These would always turn out to be hoaxes, usually perpetrated to cover up a murder, or for money or other gain. Each story ended with the same theme: a 'Bentley knows who ...' panel at the end of the penultimate page which listed the suspects and invited the reader to guess who committed the crime, followed by the revealing of the killer and the modus operandi on the final page.

With issue #11 (Jan. 1941), "Fu Chang, International Detective", "Perry Chase, The Press Guardian" and "The Rocket and the Queen of Diamonds" ended. To replace them, issue #12 (Feb. 1941) introduced two new characters. "Danny in Wonderland", a surreal fairy-tale adventure by Harry Shorten and Lin Streeter with stories loosely based on fairy tales such as "Cinderella", "Pinocchio", and The "Little Mermaid" (#12–39), while Ted Tyler, "The Fireball" (#12–20), 'sworn enemy of all who use fire for evil purposes' was a fireman who gained flame powers from a mixture of chemicals while fighting an arson attack. "Lucky Larson", a test pilot, filled the third place (#13–15). Further major changes came with the next two issues. "Lee Sampson, Midshipman" ended in #16 (June 1941); and Madam Satan was introduced in the same issue. Madam Satan, a dead villainess with a green face and the kiss of death, "the scourge of man, ready to go forth and leave a trail of misery and suffering in her wake" actually first appeared on the cover of the previous issue #15 (May 1941). She was written by Abner Sundell and initially drawn by Harry Lucey, although Joe Blair wrote her later adventures.

Next a superhero died for the first time in comics history, issue #17 (July 1941). "The Comet" series ended with him being shot by gangsters while rescuing his brother in the first tale of "The Hangman" by Cliff Campbell. Hangman took The Comet's place in Pep Comics from that issue, and also featured on every cover from #17 to #42. Issue #17 also saw "Kayo Ward" become a hobo after being terribly disfigured by a fire in the church where his wedding ceremony was taking place.

Madam Satan ended in issue #21 (Nov. 1941), her place taken in #22 (Dec. 1941) by the first appearance of one of the biggest-selling comics characters of the 20th century, Archie Andrews, and what would become the core of his group of friends: Jughead and Betty Cooper. Betty's family was depicted as having just moved into the neighborhood. This first story was written by Vic Bloom and drawn by Bob Montana. When introduced, Archie was featured in a six-page strip which was not even mentioned on the cover. Over the next few years, humor strips would slowly ease the costumed heroes and adventure tales out of Pep Comics, and Archie himself would become Pep Comics's and the Archie Comics imprint's most popular character;

Issue #26 (April 1942) had a 'Remember Pearl Harbor' cover, with The Shield, Dusty and The Hangman ringing the Liberty Bell while a Japanese and a German soldier were tied up in the bell-rope. The patriotism of The Shield G-Man Club was added to by the introduction of The Young Soldiers of America Club in #30 (Aug. 1942), to which membership was gained by buying war savings stamps and sending in a pledge form printed in Pep Comics. Each month, Pep Comics printed lists of readers who had done so. Continuing the war emphasis, "Captain Commando and the Boy Soldiers" also began in #30, following a teaser advertisement in #29 (July 1942). On a lighter note, issue #31 (Sept. 1942) had "Sergeant Boyle" visiting the MLJ offices after he had failed to send them details of his latest exploits for them to publish, while #34 (Nov. 1942) contained a one-page text piece, 'Meet the Editor', about Harry Shorten. Artist Gil Kane's first work was on the "Bentley of Scotland Yard" story 'The Case of the Laughing Corpse' in Pep Comics #38 (April 1943)

A new emphasis on humor grew from issue #40 (July 1943), just after Pep Comics started publishing to 10 issues per year. "Sergeant Boyle" ended in #39 (June 1943), as did "Danny in Wonderland". They were replaced by a Li'l Abner parody, "Catfish Joe" (#40–48) and "Li'l Chief Bugaboo" (#40–47). "Bentley of Scotland Yard" ended in #41 (August 1943), replaced by the slapstick voyages of "Marco Loco, Adventurer" (#42–52) by Carl Hubbell. Even The Shield was presented with two offbeat humor stories in #41–42, as he dealt with the chaotic antics of an alien, 'Monstro the Martian', although his stories did return to their darker side after that. This humor was also reflected on the covers, as from #41 The Shield shared the spotlight with Archie Andrews, appearing mainly as a background stooge for Archie's japes. The Hangman ended in #47 (March 1944), and although he was replaced by another costumed character, Black Hood in #48 (April 1944), the humor continued to take over. The Shield last appeared on a cover with #50 (September 1944), after which Archie featured on every cover until the end of the series in 1987. The publishing frequency dropped to quarterly between 1944 and 1946. Issue #52 (March 1945), saw the arrival of Harry Sahle's dizzy blond "Suzie", who could never keep a job long.

Archie's rise in popularity continued, and Pep Comics was used to further this. Issue #42s 'G-Man Club' page (Sept.1943) was all about Archie having a regular radio spot on the National Broadcasting System, and the cover announced in a large banner across the page 'Archie Talks – Tune in Your Radio over the Blue Network' . The cover also depicted The Shield and Hangman in blue shadows, while watching Archie recording in the studio. By #49 (March 1945), the first 52-page issue, the cover was bannered 'Starring Archie Andrews' , and Archie started being featured in the lead story from then on. Except for appearances in #59 and #60 (both from 1946), the recently introduced Black Hood disappeared after issue #51 (Dec. 1944), leaving only The Shield as a non-humor story. Issue #53 (June 1955) began a family strip called "The Twiddles" by Bill Woggon. Also introduced was "Pokey Oakey" (#53–55) who had previously been in Top-Notch Comics and "Willie the Wise-Guy" by Red Holmdale. By #56 (March 1946) the cover sported the legend 'An Archie magazine' and for the first time there was no MLJ triangle; in the following issue, #57 (June 1946), the indicia read 'Archie Comics Publications Inc', and the MLJ era of Pep Comics was over.

==== Featured series: Pep Comics (MLJ) ====
- "The Shield" – superhero (#1–65) 'with Dusty the spectacular boy detective'
- "The Comet" – superhero (#1–16)
- "Sergeant Boyle" – war adventure (#1–39)
- "Queen of Diamonds" – science fiction (#1–#12)
- "Fu Chang, International Detective" – adventure (#1–11)
- "Bentley of Scotland Yard" – mystery detective (#1–41)
- "The Press Guardian" – (#1–11) "Perry Chase, The Press Guardian" from #7
- "The Midshipman" – war adventure (#1–16) "Lee Sampson, Midshipman" from #6–16
- "Kayo Ward" – boxing adventure (#1–28)
- "Buttonhead" – humor (#2–5) "Prince Buttonhead" in #5
- "Danny in Wonderland" – surreal fantasy adventure (#12–39)
- "The Fireball" – superhero (#12–20)
- "Lucky Larson" – adventure (#13–15)
- "Madam Satan" – supervillain (#16–21)
- "The Hangman" – superhero (#17–47)
- "Archie" – humor (#22–411)
- "Jolly Roger and his Sky Pirates" – war adventure (#21–27)
- "Wings Johnson of Air Patrol" – #28 from Top-Notch Comics
- "Captain Commando and the Boy Soldiers" – costumed hero/war (#30–52, 54, 56)
- "Catfish Joe" – humor (#40–48)
- "Lil Chief Bugaboo" – humor (#40–47)
- "Marco Loco, Adventurer" – humor (#42–52)
- "Black Hood" – superhero (#48–51, 59, 60 and text stories in many issues)
- "Suzie" – humor (#52–56)
- "The Twiddles" – humor (#53–56)
- "Pokey Oakey" – humor (#53–55)
- "Willie the Wise-Guy" – humor (#53–56)

Pep Comics
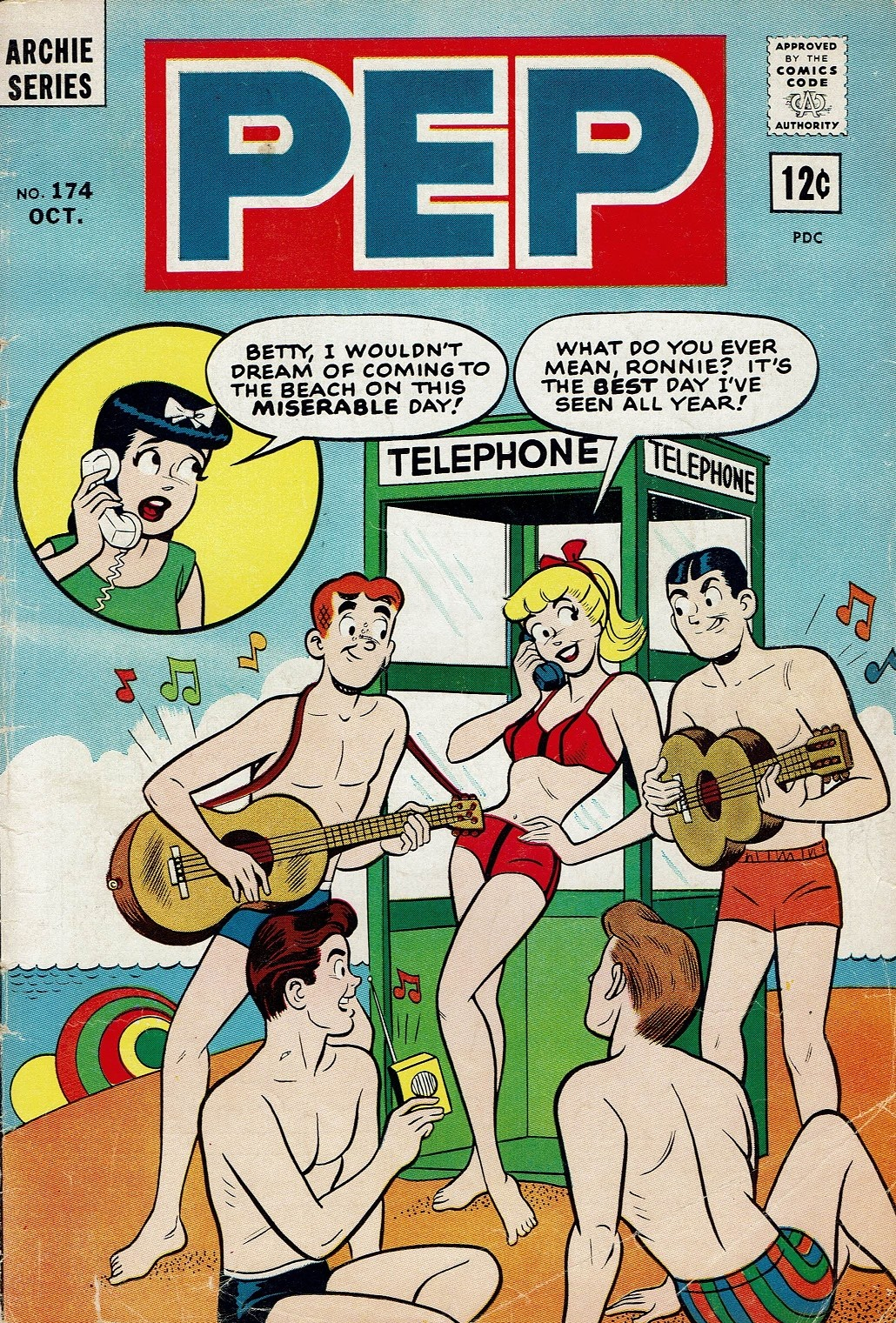
- Cover of Pep #174 (October 1964)

Publication information
- Publisher: Archie Comics
- Schedule: originally monthly, varied
- Publication date: 1. 57 (June 1946) – #411 (March 1987)
- No. of issues: 353
- Main character(s): Archie; Gloomy Gus the Homeless Ghost; Katy Keene; Li'l Jinx

Creative team
- Artist(s): Dan DeCarlo, Bob Montana, Stan Goldberg, others

=== Pep Comics (Archie) (1945–1987) ===
With the change of the Pep Comics statement of ownership from MLJ to Archie Publications Inc. from issue #57 (June 1946), the transfer from adventure to humor titles accelerated on a publication frequency that varied from 5 issues a year in 1947 to bi-monthly the following year. "Dotty and Ditto", an ongoing series from Top-Notch Comics, had transferred to Pep Comics with issue #57 (June 1946), although it ended in #58 (with a guest appearance in Dotty's dreams by the Shield, Archie, and Suzie). A new long-running series began, "Gloomy Gus the Homeless Ghost" in #59 (Dec. 1946). Bill Woggon's "Katy Keene The Pin-Up Queen" a model whose stories were filled with costumes designed by readers (who were given namechecks in the issue their designs appeared in) replaced "Suzie". Li'l Jinx arrived in #62 (July 1947), replacing Black Hood—who had made two final appearances in #59–60 and revealed his identity to the world, becoming a detective. All these humor strips would continue in Pep Comics for years, Katy Keene running until #154, although Bill Woggon had stopped drawing her with #126, and Li'l Jinx staying to the end.

"The Original Shield and Dusty the Boy Detective" finally ended their run in Pep Comics in #65 (January 1948), after two reprint stories in the last two issues, after which Pep Comics became an all-humor title. The "G-Man Club" became "The Archie Club" the next issue.

With issue #137 (February 1960), both the cover title and the indicia were changed from Pep Comics to simply Pep, a change which continued for the remainder of the series.

Published details of sales of Pep in the 1960s from the 'Statement of Circulation' show that average sales of the title were between 269,504 in 1960 and 292,572 in 1969. During the 1970s this dropped to between 231,963 and 100,827, although publication frequency crept up to nine times a year by 1964, after which Pep returned to monthly publication.

There was a minor revival in superhero characters between #150 (Oct. 1961) and #160 (Jan. 1963), when Archie Comics included a short run of stories featuring their recent superheroes The Fly, Flygirl and The Jaguar in loose rotation, plus one extra Jaguar story in #168 (January 1964). In addition, issue #393 (Mar. 1984) contained an appearance by Martin Greim's talking animal character Thunderbunny, when Archie Comics briefly licensed the character.

Issues #218 (June 1968) and #227 (March 1969) featured Archie and his friends as pop band 'The Archies' on the covers, a fictional band which was later put together for real, also as The Archies.

Pep published its 200th issue in October 1966, its 300th in April 1975, and its 400th in May 1985—an issue which included cameos of all the staff of Archie Comics. However, by then sales had slipped from their previous levels to 55,164. The series lasted until #411 (Mar. 1987). A number of the Archie Giant Series Magazines from 1987 to 1991 carried the PEP name on the cover (#576, 589, 604, 614, and 624), but it has not been revived since. In August 2009 Michael Uslan announced that a series of five one-shot comics reviving the Archie-as-superhero 'Pureheart' concept would be released in 2010, with one of those titles being Pep Comics; however, the series was never released. A special one-shot Pep Comics featuring Betty and Veronica was published for the May 2011 Free Comic Book Day.

==== Featured series: Pep Comics (Archie) ====
- "The Shield" – superhero (#1–65) 'with Dusty the spectacular boy detective'
- "Black Hood" – superhero (#59–60)
- "Suzie" – humor (#57–?)
- "The Twiddles" – humor (#57–58, 61, 63–?)
- "Pokey Oakey" – humor (#53–55)
- "Willie the Wise–Guy" – humor (#59–62, 64–?)
- "Hotfoot the Hobo" – humor (#57–?)
- "Dotty and Ditto" – (#57–58) (from Top–Notch Comics)
- "Gloomy Gus the Homeless Ghost" – humor (#59, 61–?)
- "Katy Keene The Pin–Up Queen" – humor (#60–?)
- "Li'l Jinx" – humor (#62–?)
- "The Jaguar – superhero (#150, 152, 157, 159)
- "The Fly" – superhero (#151, 154, 160)
- "Fly Girl" – superhero (#151, 154, 156, 160)

=== Pep Digital (Archie) (2012–2016) ===
In 2012, Archie Comics began publishing a digital-only anthology series titled Pep Digital. The first issue, released March 2012, was Archie's Arch Madness, a 102 page book with a basketball theme. The series ran for 185 issues, concluding with Archie & Friends: Thanksgiving Feast in November 2016.

== Reprints ==
- Pep Comics' Archie stories have been reprinted in a large number of other Archie Comics titles over the years, particularly within the multiple digest magazine titles.
- Some Golden Age superhero titles have been reprinted sporadically since, but the adventure and crime series have not.
- Most, if not all, of The Jaguar, Fly and Flygirl stories from Pep Comics #150–160 and #168 were reprinted several times in random order in a resized black and white format by Alan Class Comics in the U.K. during the 1960s and 1970s.

=== Archie Archives ===
Issues 22 through 78 of Pep Comics were reprinted alongside select issues of Archie Comics, Jackpot Comics, and Laugh Comics in the 13-volume Archie Archives series.

- Archie Archives Vol. 1 (Pep Comics #22–38; Archie Comics #1–2; Jackpot Comics #4–8)
- Archie Archives Vol. 2 (Pep Comics #39–45; Archie Comics #3–6; Jackpot Comics #9)
- Archie Archives Vol. 3 (Pep Comics #46–50; Archie Comics #7–10)
- Archie Archives Vol. 4 (Pep Comics #51–53; Archie Comics #11–14)
- Archie Archives Vol. 5 (Pep Comics #54–56; Archie Comics #15–18)
- Archie Archives Vol. 6 (Pep Comics #57–58; Archie Comics #19–22)
- Archie Archives Vol. 7 (Pep Comics #59–61; Archie Comics #23–25; Laugh Comics #20–21)
- Archie Archives Vol. 8 (Pep Comics #62–64; Archie Comics #26–28; Laugh Comics #22–23)
- Archie Archives Vol. 9 (Pep Comics #65–67; Archie Comics #29–31; Laugh Comics #25–26)
- Archie Archives Vol. 10 (Pep Comics #67–79; Archie Comics #32–34, Laugh Comics #27–28)
- Archie Archives Vol. 11 (Pep Comics #70–72; Archie Comics #35–36, Laugh Comics #29–31)
- Archie Archives Vol. 12 (Pep Comics #73–75, Archie Comics #37–39, Laugh Comics #32–34)
- Archie Archives Vol. 13 (Pep Comics #76–78, Archie Comics #39–40, Laugh Comics #35–37)
