= Shield (Archie Comics) =

Character in Archie Comics

The Shield
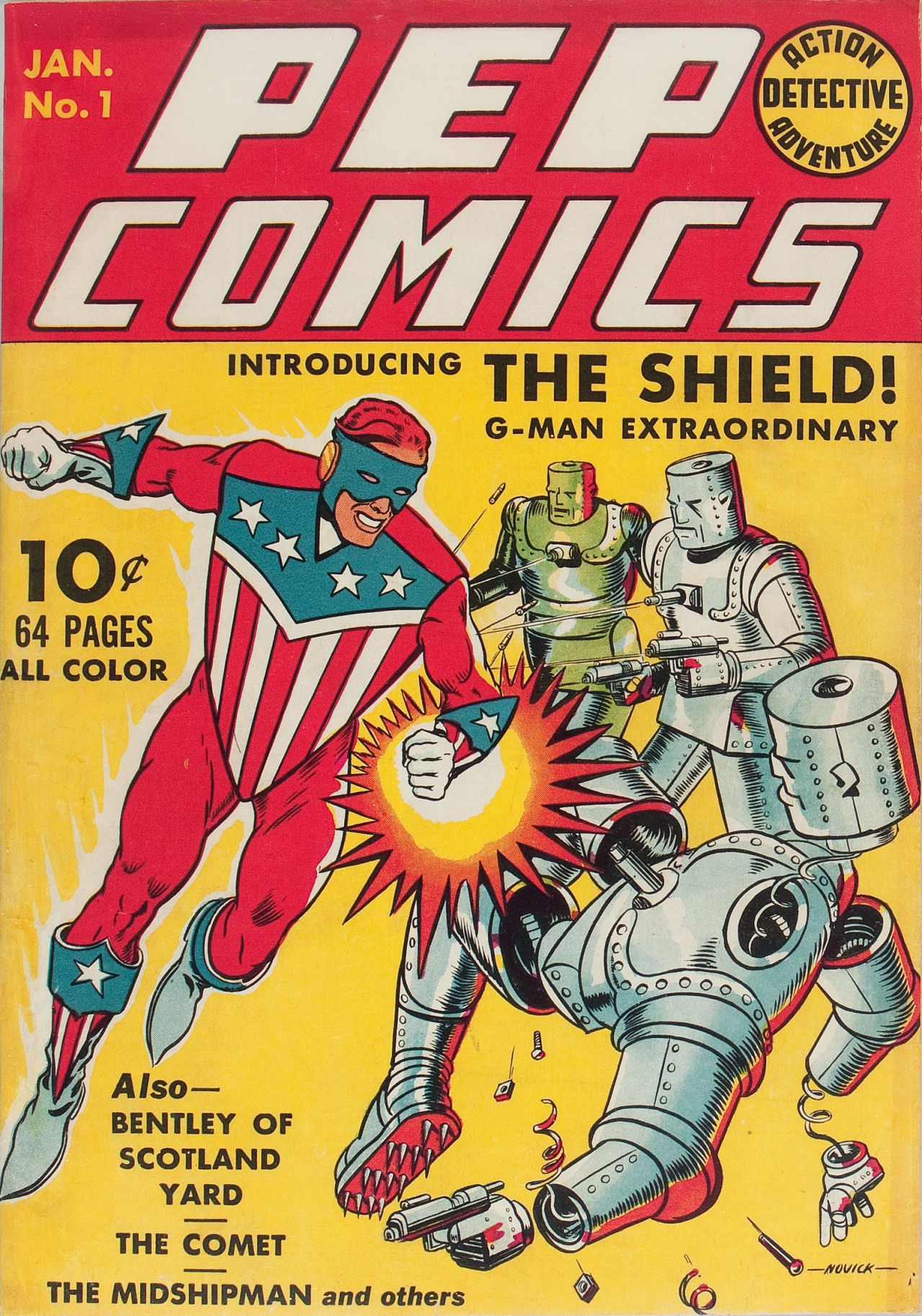
- Pep Comics #1 (January 1940) by Irv Novick.

Publication information
- Publisher: MLJ/Archie
- First appearance: Higgins Pep Comics #1 (January 1940) Barnes Legend of Shield #13 (July 1992) Adams The Shield (vol. 5) #1 (October 2015)
- Created by: Higgins Harry Shorten Irv Novick Adams Adam Christopher (script) Chuck Wendig (script) David Williams

In-story information
- Alter ego: Joe Higgins; Lt. Michael Barnes; Victoria Adams
- Team affiliations: Mighty Crusaders
- Abilities: Superhuman strength; Great leaping; Invulnerability; Wears an indestructible costume
The Shield
Publication information
- Publisher: Archie Comics; Impact Comics
- Format: Ongoing series
- Publication date: June 1959 – present
- No. of issues: (vol. 1) 2 (vol. 2) 7 (vol. 3) 4 (vol. 4) 17 (#1–16 plus 1 Annual) (vol. 5) 4
Creative team
- Written by: Adam Christopher (vol. 5); Chuck Wendig (vol. 5)
- Artist: David Williams (vol. 5)

The Shield is the name of several superheroes created by MLJ (now known as Archie Comics). Appearing 14 months before Captain America, the Shield has the distinction of being the first superhero with a costume based upon United States patriotic iconography. The character appeared in Pep Comics from issue #1 (January 1940) to #65 (January 1948).

The name was used by MLJ/Archie for four characters. DC Comics' Impact line, which licensed the Archie properties, also used the name for several characters. In 2010, DC announced plans to integrate the Shield and other MLJ characters into the DC Universe, but the rights to the characters reverted to Archie Comics in 2011. A fourth Shield was introduced in October 2015.

== Publication history ==
The Shield debuted in MLJ's Pep Comics #1 (cover-dated Jan. 1940). Writer Harry Shorten and artist Irv Novick created the character. With the American populace reacting to the beginnings of World War II and wartime patriotism stirring, the Shield debuted as the first patriotically themed hero. He was soon followed by three other patriotic comic characters: Minute-Man (Feb. 1941), Captain America (March 1941), and Captain Battle (May 1941).

In 1959, a new Shield, Lancelot Strong, appeared under the Archie Adventure Series imprint in a series titled The Double Life of Private Strong. It was cancelled after two issues.

Red Circle Comics reintroduced Lancelot Strong in a new series titled Lancelot Strong: The Shield in June 1983. The series was retitled twice, first with Shield-Steel Sterling in December 1983 and then with Steel Sterling in January 1984. In July 1984, the series ended with its seventh issue.

In 1984, Red Circle Comics also released a series starring the Joe Higgins version of the Shield in a series titled Original Shield. It lasted four issues.

In 1991, Archie Comics licensed their superheroes to DC Comics who created an imprint called Impact Comics. The company launched a fourth solo series, The Legend of the Shield. It featured two Shields, Joe Higgins, who led the series for the first thirteen issues, and Lt. Michael Barnes, his replacement. Barnes continued as the Shield until the title ended in October 1992.

In 2015, Archie Comics began the Shield's return in a new series penned by Adam Christopher and Chuck Wendig. This version of the character is a woman named Victoria Adams. The series was published under the Dark Circle Comics banner. It was originally set to be released in April but was delayed until September.

== Joe Higgins ==
=== MLJ Comics ===
==== Fictional character biography ====
The origin story of The Shield appeared in Shield–Wizard Comics #1 (Summer 1940). He is really chemist Joe Higgins, the son of Lieutenant Tom Higgins. Tom was working on a chemical formula for super-strength which the Germans were after, and is slain by German saboteur Hans Fritz in the Black Tom explosion, for which Tom was blamed. After Tom's death, Joe continues to work on it while continuing his studies of chemistry. Joe finally figures out the solution, which requires applying the chemicals to certain parts of his anatomy (Sacrum, Heart, Innervation, Eyes, Lungs, Derma), and exposing himself to x-rays. This gives him super strength, the ability able to make great leaps, and invulnerability. Joe uses the initials S.H.I.E.L.D. as his secret identity. His white costume becomes the familiar colors under the process. He becomes an FBI agent (whose secret identity is known only to FBI Chief J. Edgar Hoover) after clearing his father's name, and fights foreign agents and other threats to the U.S. At the start of the strip, Higgins' partners are fellow G-Man Ju Ju Watson, and girlfriend Betty Warren.

The Shield is joined by a kid partner, Dusty the Boy Detective, in Pep #11 (Jan 1941). Dusty's father had been killed by foreign agents, and he is adopted by Joe and given a costume. Both heroes wear their patriotic costumes beneath their street clothes and change for action whenever the need would arise. Dusty also partners with The Wizard's kid partner, Roy, as the "Boy Buddies".

In Pep #20, Joe is called "The One and Only Shield" at the start of the story and "The Original Shield" at the end of the story because of the success of Captain America, another 1940s-era patriotic superhero. In his first appearance, Captain America had a shield similar to the main part of The Shield's costume, but it was changed to a round shield for the second issue over accusations of plagiarism.

The Shield and Dusty were featured in the first crossover storyline in American comic books. The storyline had them team up with the Wizard (the headlining character from Top-Notch Comics) to stop the invasion plot orchestrated by Mosconia (a fictional country made up of elements from Nazi Germany and the Soviet Union).

The Shield was one of MLJ's most popular characters, even spawning a club, the "Shield G-Man Club". He starred in Pep, and several other MLJ titles: Shield-Wizard, Top-Notch Comics. But then a new character arrived who would overshadow him: Archie Andrews. He would take the Shield's cover spot on Pep, take his fan club, and cause the end of the MLJ superheroes.

An older Joe Higgins appears in New Crusaders as the sole survivor of the Brain Emperor's attack on his fellow Crusaders. He gathers their teenage children to form a team dubbed "the New Crusaders".

=== DC Comics ===
The Red Circle Comics characters, aptly named "The Red Circle", were again licensed by DC and rebooted. During the Dilation crisis a version of the Shield character was seen helping Green Arrow and Black Canary, performing crowd control. First appearing as a secondary character in The Web, another former MLJ hero, the new Shield is Lieutenant Joseph Higgins, stationed in Afghanistan, from where he tries to contact The Web to find his missing father. On the same day however his crew fall victim to terrorists, and Higgins is grievously wounded. To save his life, he agrees to be subjected to secret government experiments, after which an advanced, nanotech battle suit is merged to his burned epidermis. The suit appears on his body at will and grants him the same array of powers of the earlier incarnation, including superhuman strength, limited flight and advanced sensory abilities. Due to his severe injuries, the only major drawback is that if ever he tries to remove the war suit permanently, his bodily functions could shut down. Still fighting as the new, patriotic hero, he is again contacted by The Web, accepting his request for help.

The Shield also appeared in the 2010 DC Comics mini series The Mighty Crusaders.

== Lancelot Strong ==
In June 1959, a new Shield was published by Archie that had no connection to the previous version.

Joe Simon was asked by Archie to create characters for a new "Archie Adventure Series" line of superheroes. Joe Simon created a new Shield-type of superhero, whose real identity was Lancelot Strong, who appeared in a new title, The Double Life of Private Strong. Joe Simon put together a team of artists including Jack Kirby to work for him on The Double Life of Private Strong.

Lancelot's scientist father developed a method to create a superhuman by expanding the mind, which he used on his infant son. After his father was killed by foreign agents, Lancelot was adopted by a farm couple and raised as their son. Once he hit his teens, he discovered the truth of his background and his powers: strength, flight, near-invulnerability, vision powers, the ability to generate lightning, and a few more. His father had created a patriotic costume for him, and he started off as the new superhero, the Shield. He soon joined the Army, acting like a Gomer Pyle-style country bumpkin, while leading a double life as the Shield (hence the title of his comic).

In 1999, Archie formally assigned all rights to Lancelot Strong and the Fly to Joe Simon.

== Bill Higgins and Joe Higgins Jr. ==
When Archie revamped their superheroes under their "Radio Comics/Mighty Comics" line, a third Shield was introduced as Bill Higgins and Joe Higgins Jr., sons of the original Shield. Bill first appeared in the new Fly-Man #31, and becomes one of the main founders of the Mighty Crusaders. It would be revealed that his father was turned to stone by the villain, The Eraser, and Bill was carrying on his father's work. Bill's 'powers', which seem to be enhanced strength and limited invulnerability, were derived from his costume. He would appear through the end of the Radio/Mighty Comics run. Originally they would switch the name from Bill Higgins to Joe Higgins Jr., from one appearance to the next. In the Red Circle Mighty Crusaders #1 the story established that Bill joined the Army and left his life as a superhero. In 2000, Archie Comics started using Joe Higgins Jr. as the Shield in Archie's Weird Mysteries, establishing that Bill and Joe Jr. were separate characters.

== Michael Barnes ==
When Legend of the Shield was revamped, Lt. Michael Barnes, a married father with a young daughter, became the new Shield. Barnes would continue as the lead character until the series' 1992 cancellation and also appeared as the Shield in the six-issue miniseries The Crucible.

== Victoria Adams ==
In 2015, Archie Comics rebranded their Red Circle Comics line under the new Dark Circle Comics banner. The new Shield debuted in her own new series titled The Shield in October. Victoria Adams is the first female to take up the mantle of the Shield. The series ran four issues. She has continued in her role as the Shield in The Mighty Crusaders written by Ian Flynn.
