= List of comics creators appearing in comics =

Several comic book and comic strip writers, artists, and others have appeared within the fictional world of comics, both their own and others'. Some appear as simple characters in the story, some appear as characters who break the fourth wall and address the reader directly, and some make cameo appearances in framing sequences to introduce a story and sometimes to have a last word.

Fantastic Four #10 (Jan. 1963): Featuring writer and editor Stan Lee and penciller Jack Kirby. Cover art by Kirby and Dick Ayers.

" * " = "behind the scenes" stories not in regular continuity

== A ==
- Jack Abel

Sgt Fury and His Howing Commandos #164 (June 1981)

- Jack Adler

The Inferior Five #6 (Jan.-Feb. 1968): "How to Make a Bomb!"
Superman's Girl Friend Lois Lane #117 (December 1971):"Rose and the Thorn: The Ghost with Two Faces" (as "Zack Adler")

- Arthur Adams

Excalibur: Mojo Mayhem (December 1989)

- Mike Allred

FF vol 2 #10 (September 2013): "Paint it Black"

- Ross Andru

Sea Devils #13 (September-October 1963): "The Secrets of Three Sunken Ships!"
Wonder Woman #158 (November 1965): "The End -- Or the Beginning!"

- Jim Aparo

The Brave and the Bold #124 (January 1976): "Small War of the Super Rifles"

- Sergio Aragones

Jon Sable, Freelance #33 (July 1986)

- Stan Aschmeier (aka Stan Asch, Stan Josephs)

Flash Comics #71 (May 1946): "Johnny Thunder"

- Dick Ayers

Sgt. Fury and his Howling Commandos #22 (September 1965): "Don't Turn Your Back on Bull McGiveney!"
Sgt. Fury and his Howling Commandos Special #4 (Aug. 1968): "Gary and Dick Up Front!"
Sgt. Fury and his Howling Commandos Special #6 (Aug. 1970): "Through the Past Darkly"
Sgt. Fury and his Howling Commandos #100 (July 1972): "100th Anniversary!"

== B ==
- David Baldeón

Gwenpool Strikes Again #3 (Oct. 2019)

- Cary Bates

The Flash #228 (Aug. 1974): "The Day I Saved The Flash!"
Justice League of America #123 (Oct. 1975): "Where on Earth Am I?"
Justice League of America #124 (Nov. 1975): "Avenging Ghosts of the Justice Society!"

- Karen Berger

House of Mystery #292 (May 1981): untitled.
Captain America #267 (March 1982): "The Man Who Made a Difference!"
House of Mystery #321 (October 1983): "This Property is Condemned!"
The New Teen Titans #20 (June 1982): "A Titanic Tale of Titans' Tomfoolery!"
normalman-Megaton Man Special #1 (August 1994): "Lest No Bridge Be Unburned"

- Alfred Bester

Comic Cavalcade #6 (Spring 1944): "They Are Invincible!"

- Otto Binder

Shazam #1 (Feb. 1973): "In The Beginning"

- Charles Biro

Target Comics vol. 2, #4 (June 1941): "Target and the Targeteers: The Case of the Cartoon Crimes"
Crime Does Not Pay #30 (November 1943): "Inside Story"

- Bob Bolling

Pep Comics #400 (May 1985): "Pep 400"
Archie Giant Series Magazine Presents Pep Comics #614 (October 1990): "All in a Day's... Work?"

- Murray Boltinoff

Detective Comics #70 (December 1942): "Air Wave: Who Rubbed Out the Editor?"
The Inferior Five #6 (Jan.-Feb. 1968): "How to Make a Bomb!"
The Doom Patrol #121 (Sept./Oct. 1968): "The Death of the Doom Patrol?"
The Brave and the Bold #124 (January 1976): "Small War of the Super Rifles"

- Brian Bondurant

Duck-Girl #0 (Aug. 2000): "Made in Japan."

- B. C. Boyer

The Masked Man #9 (April 1986): "The End"

- Tom Breevoort

FF vol 2 #10 (September 2013): "Paint it Black"

- E. Nelson Bridwell

The Inferior Five #6 (Jan.-Feb. 1968): "How to Make a Bomb!"

- Dick Briefer

Prize Comics #30 (April 1943): "Frankenstein"

- John Broome

Detective Comics 343 (September 1965): "The Secret War of the Phantom General"

- Sol Brodsky

Sub-Mariner #19 (November 1969): "Support Your Local Sting-Ray!"
What If? #11 (Oct. 1978): "What if the Fantastic Four Were the Original Marvel Bullpen?"

- Eliot R. Brown

Uncanny X-Men Annual #7 (1983): "Scavenger Hunt"

- Frank Brunner

Iron Man #72 (January 1975): "Convention of Fear!"

- Harry Brunt

Dime Comics #27 (May 1946): "Lank The Yank"

- Rich Buckler

Astonishing Tales #25 (Aug. 1970): "Deathlok The Demolisher"

- Brian Buniak

Thunder Bunny #1 (Jan. 1984), "The Greatest Story Ever Told"

- Carl Burgos

Marvel Mystery Comics #34 (Aug. 1942): "The Human Torch"
Strange Tales #123 (Aug. 1964): "The Birth of the Beetle"

- Kurt Busiek

The Avengers vol. 3, #14 (March 1999): "Hi, Honey... ...I'm Hooooome!" *

- John Byrne

E-Man #6 (Charlton, January 1975): "Rog 2000 in That Was No Lady" (as "Burns")
Iron Fist #8 (October 1976): "Like Tigers in the Night!"
Iron Fist #15 (Sept. 1977): "Enter the X-Men"
X-Men #121 (May 1979): "Shoot-Out At The Stampede!"
Fantastic Four #216 (March 1980): "Where There Be Gods!"
E-Man #2 (First Comics, 1982)
Destroyer Duck #2-6 (1982) - parody character "Booster Cogburn"
The Complete Rog 2000 (1982): "The Coming of the Gang"
Fantastic Four #262 (January 1984): "The Trial of Mr. Fantastic"
The Thing #7 (January 1984): "What Th'!?"
The Star Brand #11 (Jan. 1988): "Celebrity"
The Star Brand #12 (Mar. 1988): "The White Event Explained!" – "killed" in an explosion at a Pittsburgh-area comic book convention
The Sensational She-Hulk #41 (July 1992): "Rock & Ruin"
The Sensational She-Hulk #50: (April 1993): "He's Dead?!"
Hulk #1 (April 1999): "Everything You Ever Wanted To Know About The Hulk (But Were Afraid To Ask!)"

== C ==
- Milton Caniff

Pin-Up (1995 – )

- Al Capp

Li'l Abner (daily strips: July 20, 1949; April 16 and 17, 1951)
Action Comics #55 (Dec. 1942): "A Goof Named Tiny Rufe"* (as "Al Hatt")

- Mike Carlin

X-Men Annual #7 (1983): "Scavenger Hunt"
Captain America #289 (Jan. 1984): Cover and "Bernie America, Sentinel of Liberty"

- Paul Chadwick

Concrete Eclectica #2 (1993)

- Hank Chapman

Astonishing #4 (June 1951): "The Nightmare"

- Don Chin

Clint #2 (January 1987): "Magnum Farce"

- Chris Claremont

Marvel Premiere #24 (Sept. 1975): "Summerkill"
X-Men #98 (April 1976): "Merry Christmas, X-Men..."
X-Men #105 (June 1977): "The Flame, The Frenzy... and Firelord", pp. 10 and 11
Iron Fist #15 (Sept. 1977): "Enter the X-Men"
Man-Thing vol. 2, #11 (July 1981): "Hell's Gate"
X-Men Annual #7 (1983): "Scavenger Hunt"
Excalibur: Mojo Mayhem (December 1989)
normalman-Megaton Man Special #1 (August 1994): "Lest No Bridge Be Unburned"

- Ta-Nehisi Coates

Howard The Duck #10 (October 2016): "...Hell If I Know..." (as "Ta-Nehi-C")

- Dave Cockrum

X-Men #105 (June 1977): "The Flame, The Frenzy... and Firelord", pp. 10 and 11
Iron Fist #15 (Sept. 1977): "Enter the X-Men"
E-Man #2 (First Comics, 1982)

- Paty Cockrum

Iron Fist #15 (Sept. 1977): "Enter the X-Men"

- Gene Colan

Sea Devils #13 (September-October 1963): "The Secrets of Three Sunken Ships!"
Daredevil Special #1 (Sept. 1967): "At the Stroke of Midnight" *

- Jack Cole

Crack Comics #33 (Spring 1944), 34 (Summer 1944): "Inkie"

- L. B. Cole

Ghostly Weird Stories #120 (September 1953): "Night-Monster" (as comic book editor "L.B.")
Crack Comics #33 (Spring 1944), 34 (Summer1944): "Inkie"

- Amanda Conner

Archie Giant Series Magazine Presents Pep Comics #614 (October 1990): "All in a Day's... Work?"
Harley Quinn #0 (2013): "Picky Sicky"
Harley Quinn #27 (2017): "Master of Her Domain"

- Gerry Conway

Batman #237 (Dec. 1971): "Night of the Reaper"
Justice League of America #103 (Dec. 1972): "A Stranger Walks among Us!"
Amazing Adventures #16 (Jan. 1973): "And the Juggernaut Will Get You... If You Don't Watch Out!"
Thor #207 (Jan. 1973): "Firesword!"
Fantastic Four #176 (Nov. 1976): "Improbable As It May Seem – The Impossible Man Is Back in Town!"

- Johnny Craig

Tales From The Crypt #31 (August-September 1952):"Kamen's Kalamity!"

- Danny Crespi

Uncanny X-Men Annual #7 (1983): "Scavenger Hunt"

== D ==
- Nicholas Da Silva aka ZOOLOOK

X-Men Forever 2 #11 (November 10, 2010): "The Gathering Storm", pp. 1, 2, 3 and 5

- Peter David

The Incredible Hulk #418 (June 1994) "We are Gathered Here"

- Alan Davis

Excalibur #24 (July 1990) "Tempting Fates"

- Jack Davis

Tales From The Crypt #31 (August-September 1952):"Kamen's Kalamity!"

- Dan DeCarlo

My Friend Irma #41 (March 1954): untitled story
My Friend Irma #48 (February 1955): untitled story
Millie the Model #77 (April 1957): untitled story
Pep Comics #400 (May 1985): "Pep 400"
Archie Giant Series Magazine Presents Pep Comics #614 (October 1990): "All in a Day's... Work?"

- Dan DeCarlo Jr

Pep Comics #400 (May 1985): "Pep 400"

- James DeCarlo

Pep Comics #400 (May 1985): "Pep 400"
Archie Giant Series Magazine Presents Pep Comics #614 (October 1990): "All in a Day's... Work?"

- Tom DeFalco

Amazing Spider-Man #275 (April 1986): "The Return of the Hobgoblin!"
The Sensational She-Hulk #50: (April 1993): "He's Dead?!"

- J.M. DeMatteis

Captain America #289 (Jan. 1984): Cover

- Dan Didio

Harley Quinn Invades Comic-Con International San Diego #1 (Sept 2014)

- Paul Dini

Harley Quinn Invades Comic-Con International San Diego #1 (Sept 2014)

- Steve Ditko

Amazing Adult Fantasy #12 (May 1962): "Something Fantastic?"
The Amazing Spider-Man Annual #1 (1964): "How Stan Lee and Steve Ditko Create Spider-Man"
Dr Strange #55 (1982): "To Have Loved... And Lost" (under the anagram name of "Ted Tevoski")

- Irwin Donenfeld

The Inferior Five #6 (Jan.-Feb. 1968): "How to Make a Bomb!"

- Lela Dowling

Dragon's Teeth #1 (1983): "Inspiration"

- Frank Doyle

Pep Comics #400 (May 1985): "Pep 400"

- Arnold Drake

Not Brand Echh #11 (December 1968): "Dark Moon Rise, Heck Hound Hurt"

- Bill Draut

Green Hornet Comics #35 (August/September 1947): "The Fat Tuesday"
Green Hornet Comics #36 (October/November 1947): "The Man Who Met Himself"

- Mike Dringenberg

Clint #2 (January 1987): "Magnum Farce"

- Jo Duffy

Crystar #5 (January 1984): "The Story They Said Couldn't Be Done!"

== E ==
- Scott Edelman

Iron Man #85 (April 1976): "...And The Freak Shall Inherit the Earth"

- Joe Edwards

Archie #2 (Spring 1943): "Bumble the Bee-tective"

- Will Eisner

The Spirit (June 8, 1947)
The Spirit (December 31, 1950), "Happy New Year"
The Spirit (January 13, 1952), "Last Day of the Planet Earth"
The Spirit (July 20, 1952), "Marry the Spirit"
The Spirit #17 (1977) and #30 (1981)
Cerebus Jam #1 (April 1985), "Cerebus v The Spirit"
The Dreamer (1986)

- Harlan Ellison

Dark Horse Presents #66 (Sept. 1992): "Concrete: Byrdland's Secret"
Justice League of America #89 (March 1971): "The Most Dangerous Dreams of All"
normalman-Megaton Man Special #1 (August 1994): "Lest No Bridge Be Unburned"

- Whitney Ellsworth

Lois Lane, Girl Reporter comic strip #8 (1944): untitled

- Steve Englehart

Justice League of America #103 (Dec. 1972): "A Stranger Walks among Us!"
Master of Kung Fu #17 (April 1974): "Lair of the Lost"
Amazing Adventures #16 (Jan. 1973): "And the Juggernaut Will Get You... If You Don't Watch Out!"
Thor #207 (Jan. 1973): "Firesword!"
Fantastic Four #333 (Mid-Nov. 1989): "The Dream is Dead Part Two" (under his pen name John Harkness)

- Trevor Von Eeden

Black Lightining #1 (April 1977)

- Mike Esposito

Sea Devils #13 (September-October 1963): "The Secrets of Three Sunken Ships!"
Wonder Woman #158 (November 1965): "The End -- Or the Beginning!"
The Inferior Five #6 (Jan.-Feb. 1968): "How to Make a Bomb!"
Sub-Mariner #19 (November 1969): "Support Your Local Sting-Ray!"
Archie Giant Series Magazine Presents Pep Comics #614 (October 1990): "All in a Day's... Work?"

- Bill Everett

Marvel Mystery Comics #34 (Aug. 1942): "The Human Torch"
Sub-Mariner #19 (November 1969): "Support Your Local Sting-Ray!"

== F ==
- Lee Falk

The Phantom: Mystery of Cape Cod (1986), The Triads (1994)
The Phantom: September 3, 2023

- Jules Feiffer

The Spirit (January 13, 1952), "Last Day of the Planet Earth"
The Spirit (December 31, 1950), "Happy New Year"

- Al Feldstein

The Haunt of Fear #17 (September-October, 1950): "Horror Beneath the Streets!"
Weird Fantasy #14 (1952)
Modern Love #8 (1952), "The Love Story to End All Love Stories!"
Tales From The Crypt #31 (August-September 1952):"Kamen's Kalamity!"

- Danny Fingeroth

Man-Thing vol. 2, #11 (July 1981): "Hell's Gate"

- Linda Florio

Marvel Preview #23 (black and white magazine format, Fall, 1980): "Annie Mae"

- Gardner Fox

All-Flash #14 (Spring 1944)
Strange Adventures #140 (May 1962), "The Strange Adventure That Really Happened"
Detective Comics #347 (January 1966), "The Strange Death of Batman!"
Captain Carrot and His Amazing Zoo Crew #14 (April 1983), "Crisis on Earth-C!"

- Gill Fox

Feature Comics #48 (September 1941): "Poison Ivy, The Mighty Mite"

- Matt Fraction

FF vol 2 #10 (September 2013): "Paint it Black"

- Ron Frenz

Amazing Spider-Man #275 (April 1986): "The Return of the Hobgoblin!"

- Barbara Friedlander-Bloomfield

The Inferior Five #6 (Jan.-Feb. 1968): "How to Make a Bomb!"

- Gary Friedrich

Sgt. Fury and his Howling Commandos Special #4 (Aug. 1968): "Gary and Dick Up Front!"
Sub-Mariner #19 (November 1969): "Support Your Local Sting-Ray!"
Sgt. Fury and his Howling Commandos Special #6 (Aug. 1970): "Through the Past Darkly"
Sgt. Fury and his Howling Commandos #100 (July 1972): "100th Anniversary!"

- Mike Friedrich

Justice League of America #89 (March 1971): "The Most Dangerous Dreams of All"
Iron Man #72 (January 1975): "Convention of Fear!"

== G ==
- Neil Gaiman

Marvel 1602 #5 (Feb 2004) *
Wolff & Byrd, Counsellors of the Macabre #4 (Nov. 1994):"A Host of Horrors"
normalman-Megaton Man Special #1 (August 1994): "Lest No Bridge Be Unburned"

- William Gaines

The Haunt of Fear #17 (September-October, 1950): "Horror Beneath the Streets!"
Weird Fantasy #14 (1952)
Modern Love #8 (1952), "The Love Story to End All Love Stories!"
Tales From The Crypt #31 (August-September 1952):"Kamen's Kalamity!"

- Ron Garney

Hulk #1 (April 1999): "Everything You Ever Wanted To Know About The Hulk (But Were Afraid To Ask!)"

- Steve Gerber

Man-Thing (1974 series) #22: "Pop Goes the Cosmos!"
Howard the Duck #16: "Zen and the Art of Comic Book Writing"

- Frank Giacoia

Sub-Mariner #19 (November 1969): "Support Your Local Sting-Ray!"

- Michael T Gilbert

Mr. Monster #7 (December 1986): "Mr. Monster's Bedtime Story"

- Kieron Gillen

You Are Deadpool #1

- Dick Giordano

The New Teen Titans #20 (June 1982): "A Titanic Tale of Titans' Tomfoolery!"

- George Gladir

Pep Comics #400 (May 1985): "Pep 400"

- Stan Goldberg

Chili #3 (July 1969): "Chili Tells It Like It Is!"
Pep Comics #400 (May 1985): "Pep 400"
Archie Giant Series Magazine Presents Pep Comics #614 (October 1990): "All in a Day's... Work?"

- Michael Golden

Detective Comics #482 (February–March 1979): "Bat-Mite's New York Adventure"
Howard the Duck #5 (black and white magazine format, May 1980): "The Tomb of Drãkula!"
X-Men Annual #7 (1983): "Scavenger Hunt"

- John L. Goldwater

Pep Comics #400 (May 1985): "Pep 400"

- Jon Goldwater

Stan Lee's Mighty 7: issue 1 (May, 2012): "How It All Began"

- Richard Goldwater

Pep Comics #400 (May 1985): "Pep 400"

- Martin Goodman (publisher)

Marvel Mystery Comics #34 (Aug. 1942): "The Human Torch"
Sgt. Fury and his Howling Commandos #100 (July 1972): "100th Anniversary!"

- Archie Goodwin

Fantastic Four #176 (Nov. 1976): "Improbable As It May Seem – The Impossible Man Is Back in Town!"
Ms. Marvel vol 1. #15 (Mar. 1978): "The Shark is a Very Deadly Beast!"
Freedom Fighters # 9 (Aug 1987), "Blitzkrieg at Buffalo"

- Victor Gorelick

Pep Comics #400 (May 1985): "Pep 400"

- René Goscinny

Asterix and the Class Act (2003)
Asterix and the Missing Scroll (2015)

- Sid Greene

Strange Adventures #140 (May 1962), "The Strange Adventure That Really Happened"

- Joseph Greene

The Green Lama #6 (August 1945): "An American Story"

- Martin L. Greim

Thunder Bunny #1 (Jan. 1984), "The Greatest Story Ever Told"

- Mike Grell

The Warlord #35 (July 1980): "Gambit"

- Barry Grossman

Pep Comics #400 (May 1985): "Pep 400"

- Mark Gruenwald

Marvel Two-In-One #60 (Feb. 1980): "Happiness is a Warm Alien"
Marvel Preview #23 (black and white magazine format, Fall, 1980): "Annie Mae"
The Sensational She-Hulk #50: (April 1993): "He's Dead?!"
X-Men Annual #7 (1983): "Scavenger Hunt"
The Star Brand #11 (Jan. 1988): "Celebrity"
The Star Brand #12 (Mar. 1988): "The White Event Explained!" – "killed" in an explosion at a Pittsburgh-area comic book convention

== H ==
- Larry Hama

X-Men Annual #7 (1983): "Scavenger Hunt"

- Bo Hampton

Cerebus Jam #1 (April 1985), "The Defense of Fort Columbia"

- Scott Hampton

Cerebus Jam #1 (April 1985), "The Defense of Fort Columbia"

- Lewis Hancox

Welcome to St. Hell: My Trans Teen Misadventure (2022)

- Mark Hanerfeld

Batman #237 (Dec. 1971): "Night of the Reaper"

- Bob Haney

The Brave and the Bold #124 (January 1976): "Small War of the Super Rifles"

- Bob Harras

Crystar #5 (January 1984): "The Story They Said Couldn't Be Done!"
Harley Quinn Invades Comic-Con International San Diego #1 (Sept 2014)

- Jack C. Harris

Detective Comics #482 (February–March 1979): "Bat-Mite's New York Adventure"
The Warlord #35 (July 1980): "Gambit"

- Lee Harris

Mystery Men Comics #2 (September 1939): "Real Life Personal Interviews with Famous Detectives - Detective Ben Rosenberg"
Detective Comics #70 (December 1942): "Air Wave: Who Rubbed Out the Editor?"

- Sol Harrison

The Inferior Five #6 (Jan.-Feb. 1968): "How to Make a Bomb!"

- Al Hartley

Patsy and Hedy #78 (October 1961): untitled story
Patsy and Hedy #85 (December 1962): "The Rage of the Roaring Twenties!"
Pep Comics #400 (May 1985): "Pep 400"

- Christopher Hastings

Gwenpool Strikes Back #4 (Nov. 2019)

- Don Heck

Sub-Mariner #19 (November 1969): "Support Your Local Sting-Ray!"

- Fred Hembeck

The Spirit #30 (Kitchen Sink Press, 1981)
The Omega Men #3 (June 1983): "Assault on Euphorix"

- Erica Henderson

Howard the Duck #10 (October 2016): "...Hell If I Know..." (as "Air-Icka")

- Al Hewetson

Sub-Mariner #19 (November 1969): "Support Your Local Sting-Ray!"

- E E Hibbard

All-Flash #14 (Spring 1944)

- Michael Higgins

Fantastic Four #262 (January 1984): "The Trial of Mr. Fantastic"
The Star Brand #11 (Jan. 1988): "Celebrity"

- Carl Hubbell

Pep Comics 31 (September 1942): "Sgt. Boyle"

== I ==
- Graham Ingels

Tales From The Crypt #31 (August-September 1952):"Kamen's Kalamity!"

- Tony Isabella

Marvel Premiere #21 (Mar. 1975): "Daughters Of The Death-Goddess"

== J ==
- Edgar P. Jacobs

Edgar P. Jacobs. Le rêveur d'apocalypses (2021)

- Benito Jacovitti

Since his 1942 one-shot story Un marinaio nella stratosfera ("A Sailor into the Stratosphere") published by Edizioni A.V.E. until his death in 1997, Jac has very often portrayed himself in his own comics, or at least was referenced by various characters, usually interacting with them.

- Al Jaffee

Groo the Wanderer vol. 2, #2 (April 1985): "Dragon Killer!"

- Paul Jenkins

New Avengers #7–10 (July–Oct. 2005): "The Sentry"

- Arvell Jones

Marvel Premiere #21 (Mar. 1975): "Daughters Of The Death-Goddess"

== K ==
- Jenette Kahn

Wonder Woman vol. 2, #8 (September 1987), p. 20: "Time Passages"

- Michael Kaluta

Marvel Premiere #24 (Sept. 1975): "Summerkill"

- Jack Kamen

Tales From The Crypt #31 (August-September 1952):"Kamen's Kalamity!"

- Gil Kane

Green Lantern vol. 2 #29 (June 1964): "Half a Green Lantern is Better than None!" *
Green Lantern #45 (June 1966): "Prince Peril's Power Play"
House of Mystery #180 (1969): "His Name is Kane"
Judgment Day: Aftermath (March 1998)

- Robert Kanigher

Wonder Woman #158 (November 1965): "The End -- Or the Beginning!"
The Inferior Five #6 (Jan.-Feb. 1968): "How to Make a Bomb!"
Action Comics #476 (March 1977): "Clark Kent's Lonely Christmas!"

- George Kashdan

The Inferior Five #6 (Jan.-Feb. 1968): "How to Make a Bomb!"

- Gary Kato

Thunder-bunny #5 (Feb. 1986): "Moonlight Miss"

- Jack Kirby

Boy Commandos #1 (Winter 1942–43): "Satan Wears a Swastika"
Headline Comics #37 (Sep/Oct 1949): Cover
Modern Love #8 (1952), "The Love Story to End All Love Stories!"
The Fantastic Four #10 (Jan. 1963): "The Return of Doctor Doom"
Fantastic Four Special #5 (Nov. 1967): "This is a Plot?" *
Sub-Mariner #19 (November 1969): "Support Your Local Sting-Ray!"
X-Men #98 (April 1976): "Merry Christmas, X-Men..."
Iron Man #85 (April 1976): "...And The Freak Shall Inherit the Earth"
What If? #11 (Oct. 1978): "What if the Fantastic Four Were the Original Marvel Bullpen?"
Thunder Bunny #1 (Jan. 1984), "The Greatest Story Ever Told"
The Dreamer by Will Eisner (1986)

- Denis Kitchen

The Spirit #30 (Kitchen Sink Press, 1981)

- Todd Klein

Detective Comics #482 (February–March 1979): "Bat-Mite's New York Adventure"

- Andy Kubert

Marvel 1602 #5 (Feb 2004)

- Joe Kubert

Whack 2 (December 1953): "The 3-D-T's: A Look Behind the Scenes at America's Screwiest Industry!"
The Sea Devils 13 (September-October 1963): "The Secrets of Three Sunken Ships!"

- Katie Kubert

Harley Quinn Invades Comic-Con International San Diego #1 (Sept 2014)

- Morrie Kuramoto

Sub-Mariner #19 (November 1969): "Support Your Local Sting-Ray!"

== L ==
- Michèle Laframboise

La Plume Japonaise (2006), previously serialized in Mensuhell #57–77 (Aug. 2004– April 2006)

- Rudy Lapick

Pep Comics #400 (May 1985): "Pep 400"
Archie Giant Series Magazine Presents Pep Comics #614 (October 1990): "All in a Day's... Work?"

- Bob Layton

The Complete Rog 2000 (1982): "The Coming of the Gang"

- Jim Lee

Harley Quinn Invades Comic-Con International San Diego #1 (Sept 2014)

- Stan Lee

All Winners Comics #2 (Fall 1941): "Winners All" (two-page text story)
Mystic Comics #10 (August 1942): "Red Skeleton" (as "Stanley Dee")
Astonishing #4 (June 1951): "The Nightmare"
Adventures into Terror #5 (August 1951): "Find Me! Find Me! Find Me!" (as 'Lee Stanton')
Suspense #29 (April 1953): "The Raving Maniac"
My Friend Irma #41 (March 1954): untitled story
Mystery Tales #24 (December 1954): "Cast of Characters!"
My Friend Irma #48 (February 1955): untitled story
Millie the Model #77 (April 1957): untitled story
Homer, the Happy Ghost #18 (March 1958): untitled story
Patsy and Hedy #78 (October 1961): untitled story
Amazing Adult Fantasy #12 (May 1962): "Something Fantastic?"
Tales of Suspense #33 (September, 1962): "I Was Trapped in the Chamber of Fear!"
Kid Colt Outlaw #107 (November 1962): "The Giant Monster of Midnight Valley!"
Patsy and Hedy #85 (December 1962): "The Rage of the Roaring Twenties!"
The Fantastic Four #10 (Jan. 1963): "The Return of Doctor Doom"
The Amazing Spider-Man Annual #1 (1964): "How Stan Lee and Steve Ditko Create Spider-Man" *
Strange Tales #123 (Aug. 1964): "The Birth of the Beetle"
Sgt. Fury and his Howling Commandos #22 (September 1965): "Don't Turn Your Back on Bull McGiveney!"
Daredevil #29 (June 1967): "Unmasked"
Daredevil Special #1 (Sept. 1967): "At the Stroke of Midnight" *
Fantastic Four Special #5 (Nov. 1967): "This is a Plot?" *
The Amazing Spider-Man Special #5 (Nov. 1968): "Here We Go-a-Plotting" *
Chili #3 (July 1969): "Chili Tells It Like It Is!"
Sub-Mariner #19 (November 1969): "Support Your Local Sting-Ray!"
Chamber of Darkness #2 (Dec. 1969) "The Day of the Red Death" (host)
Sgt. Fury and his Howling Commandos Special #6 (Aug. 1970): "Through the Past Darkly"
Daredevil #79 (August 1971): "Murder!" Cries the Man-Bull!"
Sgt. Fury and his Howling Commandos #100 (July 1972): "100th Anniversary!"
X-Men #98 (April 1976): "Merry Christmas, X-Men..."
Iron Man #85 (April 1976): "...And The Freak Shall Inherit the Earth"
Fantastic Four #176 (Nov. 1976): "Improbable As It May Seem – The Impossible Man Is Back in Town!"
What If? #11 (Oct. 1978): "What if the Fantastic Four Were the Original Marvel Bullpen?"

What If? #11 (Oct. 1978), cover art by Jack Kirby and Joe Sinnott.

Peter Parker, The Spectacular Spider-Man #54 (May 1981): "To Save the Smuggler!"
Dr Strange #55 (1982): "To Have Loved... And Lost" (under the anagram name of "Les Tane")
Stan Lee Meets Superheroes (five issues from Nov. 2006)
Stan Lee's Mighty 7: issues 1-3 (May, July and September 2012)
Marvel Universe Avengers and Ultimate Spider-Man#1 (October 2012): "...Ultimate Peter Parker"

- Kate Leth

Patsy Walker A.K.A. Hellcat! issues 7-8 (August and September 2016)

- Paul Levitz

Legion of Super-Heroes #297 (March 1983)
normalman-Megaton Man Special #1 (August 1994): "Lest No Bridge Be Unburned"

- Larry Lieber

The Amazing Spider-Man Special #5 (Nov. 1968): "Here We Go-a-Plotting" *
Sub-Mariner #19 (November 1969): "Support Your Local Sting-Ray!"
Sgt. Fury and his Howling Commandos Special #6 (Aug. 1970): "Through the Past Darkly"
Marvel Team-Up 74 (Oct. 1978): "Live From New York It's Saturday Night"
Peter Parker, The Spectacular Spider-Man #54 (May 1981): "To Save the Smuggler!"

== M ==
- Howard Mackie

The Star Brand #11 (Jan. 1988): "Celebrity"

- Ralph Macchio

Marvel Two-In-One #60 (Feb. 1980): "Happiness is a Warm Alien"

- Elliot S. Maggin

Justice League of America #123 (Oct 1975): "Where on Earth Am I?"
Justice League of America #124 (Nov. 1975): "Avenging Ghosts of the Justice Society!"
52 #24 (Oct 18, 2006): "Week Twenty-Four"

- Dick Malmgren

Pep Comics #400 (May 1985): "Pep 400"

- Bill Mantlo

Howard the Duck #5 (black and white magazine format, May 1980): "The Tomb of Drãkula!"
Marvel Premiere #24 (Sept. 1975): "Summerkill"

- Rich Margopoulos

Pep Comics #400 (May 1985): "Pep 400"

- Norman Maurer

Whack 2 (December 1953): "The 3-D-T's: A Look Behind the Scenes at America's Screwiest Industry!"

- Sheldon Mayer

All-Flash #14 (Spring 1944)
Comic Cavalcade #6 (Spring 1944): "They Are Invincible!"

- Val Mayerik

Man-Thing vol. 2, #11 (July 1981): "Hell's Gate"

- Scott McCloud

normalman-Megaton Man Special #1 (August 1994): "Lest No Bridge Be Unburned" - as "Zot McSchool"

- Dwayne McDuffie

Static Shock Special (2011)

- Merho

Suske en Wiske: "De Speelgoedspiegel" (1989), alongside his character Marcel Kiekeboe from De Kiekeboes.

- Ken Meyer Jr.

Clint #2 (January 1987): "Magnum Farce"

- Al Milgrom

Detective Comics #482 (February–March 1979): "Bat-Mite's New York Adventure"
Master of Kung Fu #17 (April 1974): "Lair of the Lost"
Marvel Premiere #24 (Sept. 1975): "Summerkill"

- Mark Millar

The Flash 80 Page Giant #1 (Aug. 1998): "Your Life Is My Business"
Simpsons Comics #88 (Nov. 2003): "Licence to Kilt"

- Moebius (Jean Giraud)

Werewolf By Night #17 (May 1974): "The Behemoth!"
Doctor Strange – Sorcerer Supreme #9 (Nov. 1989): "That Was Then... This Is NOW"

- Jack Miller

The Inferior Five #6 (Jan.-Feb. 1968): "How to Make a Bomb!"

- Doug Moench

Master of Kung Fu #64 (May 1978): "Deadly Lesson: Like Father, Like Son...?"

- Bob Montana
  Archie #2 (Spring 1943): "Bumble the Bee-tective"
- Jack Morelli

X-Men Annual #7 (1983): "Scavenger Hunt"

- Grant Morrison

Animal Man #26 (Aug. 1990): "Deus Ex Machina"
Doom Patrol #58 (Oct. 1991): "Suicide Attack"
Simpsons Comics #88 (Nov. 2003): "Licence to Kilt"

== N ==
- Ann Nocenti

X-Men Annual #7 (1983): "Scavenger Hunt"
The Incredible Hulk #291 (January 1984): "Old Soldiers Never Die!"
The Thing #7 (January 1984): "What Th'!?"

- Ryan North

Howard the Duck #10 (October 2016): "...Hell If I Know..." (as "Ry-N")

== O ==
- Dennis O'Neil

Batman #237 (Dec. 1971): "Night of the Reaper"
Detective Comics #487 (Dec. 1979/Jan. 1980): "The Perils of Sergius" (O'Neil often used the pen name Sergius O'Shaugnessy)

- Joe Orlando

House of Mystery #180 (1969): "His Name is Kane"
The Warlord #35 (July 1980): "Gambit"
House of Mystery #321 (October 1983): "This Property is Condemned!"

- James Owsley (Christopher Priest)

Amazing Spider-Man #275 (April 1986): "The Return of the Hobgoblin!"

== P ==
- Jimmy Palmiotti

Harley Quinn #0 (2013): "Picky Sicky"
Harley Quinn #27 (2017): "Master of Her Domain"

- Rick Parker

X-Men Annual #7 (1983): "Scavenger Hunt"

- George Pérez

Fantastic Four #176 (Nov. 1976): "Improbable As It May Seem – The Impossible Man Is Back in Town!"
Marvel Two-In-One #60 (Feb. 1980): "Happiness is a Warm Alien"
The New Teen Titans #20 (June 1982): "A Titanic Tale of Titans' Tomfoolery!"
The Avengers vol. 3, #14 (March 1999): "Hi, Honey... ...I'm Hooooome!" *
Wonder Woman vol. 2, #8 (September 1987), p. 20: "Time Passages"

- Wendy Pini

Ghost Rider #14
Teen Titans vol. 2, #21
E*Man Comics #17 (1984): "Smeltquest"

- Bob Powell

The Dreamer by Will Eisner (1986)

- Keith Pollard

Fantastic Four #193 (Apr. 1978): "Improbable As It May Seem – The Impossible Man Is Back in Town!"

- Bruno Premiani

The Doom Patrol #121 (Sept./Oct. 1968): "The Death of the Doom Patrol?"

== Q ==
- Joshua Quagmire

Critters #50 (March 1990): "X-Mass Blitz-Kringle"

- Joe Quinones

Howard the Duck #10 (October 2016): "...Hell If I Know..." (as "Jho")

== R ==
- Mac Raboy

The Green Lama #6 (August 1945): "An American Story"

- George van Raemdonck

He often drew himself in some stories of Bulletje en Boonestaak.

- Dennis M Reader

Super-Duper Comic (1946): "Electro Girl Battles 'The Gremlin's Post-War Plot"

- Alex Raymond

Ghostly Weird Stories #120 (September 1953): "Night-Monster"(as comic book artist "Raymond Alexander")

- Trina Robbins

Wonder Woman #5 (1989): "Logo"

- John Romita Sr.

The Amazing Spider-Man Special #5 (Nov. 1968): "Here We Go-a-Plotting" *
Sub-Mariner #19 (November 1969): "Support Your Local Sting-Ray!"
Iron Man #85 (April 1976): "...And The Freak Shall Inherit the Earth"

- Don Rosa

Star Spangled War Stories #202 (Oct./Nov. 1976): "The Cure"
Uncle Scrooge #319 (July 2003): "The Dutchman's Secret"

- George Roussos

Target Comics vol. 2, #4 (June 1941): "Target and the Targeteers: The Case of the Cartoon Crimes"

- Adrienne Roy

The New Teen Titans #20 (June 1982): "A Titanic Tale of Titans' Tomfoolery!"
Tales of the Teen Titans #50 (February 1985): "We Are Gathered Here Today"

- Bob Rozakis

Action Comics #476 (March 1977): "Clark Kent's Lonely Christmas!"
Detective Comics #482 (February–March 1979): "Bat-Mite's New York Adventure"

- Laurie Rozakis

Action Comics #476 (March 1977): "Clark Kent's Lonely Christmas!"

- Edward Ryan

Target Comics vol. 4, no. 1 (March 1943): "Target and the Targeteers"

- Joe Rubinstein

Amazing Spider-Man #275 (April 1986): "The Return of the Hobgoblin!"

== S ==
- Ross Saakel

Active Comics #21 (1945): "Some Panthers Don't Wear Skates"

- Archer St. John

Whack 2 (December 1953): "The 3-D-T's: A Look Behind the Scenes at America's Screwiest Industry!" (as "Mr. St. Peter")

- Alex Saviuk

The Amazing Spider-Man newspaper strip, March 23, 2019

- Samm Schwartz

Pep Comics #400 (May 1985): "Pep 400"
Archie Giant Series Magazine Presents Pep Comics #614 (October 1990): "All in a Day's... Work?"

- Jack Schiff

The Inferior Five #6 (Jan.-Feb. 1968): "How to Make a Bomb!"

- Julius Schwartz

Strange Adventures #140 (May 1962), "The Strange Adventure That Really Happened"
The Inferior Five #6 (Jan.-Feb. 1968): "How to Make a Bomb!"
The Flash #179 (May 1968): "Flash – Fact Or Fiction"
Justice League of America #103 (Dec. 1972): "A Stranger Walks among Us!" (mentioned, not seen)
Detective Comics #453 (November 1975): cover
X-Men #98 (April 1976): "Merry Christmas, X-Men..."
Action Comics #476 (March 1977): "Clark Kent's Lonely Christmas!"
Superman #411 (Sept. 1985): "The Last Earth-Prime Story"
Action Comics #565 (March 1985): "Ambush Bug in '$ellout' or 'Manna from Mando'"
Ambush Bug #3 (Aug. 1985): "The Ambush Bug History of the DC Universe"
Ambush Bug #4 (Sept. 1985): "Whoops"
DC Comics Presents Hawkman #1 (Sept. 2004): "Secret Behind the Stolen Super-Weapons"
DC Comics Presents Justice League of America #1 (Oct. 2004): "Visitors Day"

- John Severin

Sgt. Fury and his Howling Commandos Special #4 (Aug. 1968): "Gary and Dick Up Front!"
Sgt. Fury and his Howling Commandos Special #6 (Aug. 1970): "Through the Past Darkly"

- Marie Severin

Sub-Mariner #19 (November 1969): "Support Your Local Sting-Ray!"
Fantastic Four #176 (Nov. 1976): "Improbable As It May Seem – The Impossible Man Is Back in Town!"
Ms. Marvel vol 1. #15: "The Shark is a Very Deadly Beast"
Sgt Fury and His Howing Commandos #164 (June 1981)

- Scott Shaw

Superman's Pal Jimmy Olsen #144 (Dec. 1971): "A Big Thing in a Deep Scottish Lake"

- Jim Shooter

Iron Man #123 (June 1979): "Casino Fatale"
Howard the Duck #5 (black and white magazine format, May 1980): "The Tomb of Drãkula!"
X-Men Annual #7 (1983): "Scavenger Hunt"
Marvel Team-Up #137 (January 1984): "Twinkle, Twinkle"

- Harry Shorten

Pep Comics 31 (September 1942): "Sgt. Boyle"
Archie #2 (Spring 1943): "Bumble the Bee-tective"

- Louis Silberkleit

Pep Comics #400 (May 1985): "Pep 400"

- Joe Simon

Boy Commandos #1 (Winter 1942–43): "Satan Wears a Swastika"
Modern Love #8 (1952), "The Love Story to End All Love Stories!"
Justice Traps the Guilty #56 (Nov. 1953): Cover

- Louise Simonson

Man-Thing vol. 2, #11 (July 1981): "Hell's Gate"
X-Men Annual #7 (1983): "Scavenger Hunt"
New Mutants #21 (November 1984): "Slumber Party!" (page 2)

- Joe Sinnott

Fantastic Four #176 (Nov. 1976): "Improbable As It May Seem – The Impossible Man Is Back in Town!"

- Steve Skeates

Marvel Preview #23 (black and white magazine format, Fall, 1980): "Annie Mae"

- Barbara Slate

New Kid (graphic novel) by Jerry Craft, HarperCollinsPublishers, 2019, pages 172-73, 222-23

- Marc Sleen

The Adventures of Nero: He made countless cameo appearances in several of his albums, sometimes even directly interfering with his own characters.

- Roger Slifer

The Complete Rog 2000 (1982): "The Coming of the Gang"

- Bob Smith

Detective Comics #482 (February–March 1979): "Bat-Mite's New York Adventure"

- Paul Smith

X-Men Annual #7 (1983): "Scavenger Hunt"

- Art Spiegelman

Supernatural Law Big First Amendment Issue (2005)

- Frank Springer

Not Brand Echh #11 (December 1968): "Dark Moon Rise, Heck Hound Hurt"

- Al Stahl

Crack Comics ##28 (March 1943), 30 (August 1943), 31 (October 1943), 32 (december 1943), 39 (Autumn 1945): "Inkie"

- Jim Starlin

Star Reach #1 (1974): "Death Building"
Master of Kung Fu #17 (April 1974): "Lair of the Lost"

- Flo Steinberg

Sub-Mariner #19 (November 1969): "Support Your Local Sting-Ray!"
What If? #11 (Oct. 1978): "What if the Fantastic Four Were the Original Marvel Bullpen?"

- Roger Stern

The Complete Rog 2000 (1982): "The Coming of the Gang"
The Thing #7 (January 1984): "What Th'!?"

- Dave Stevens

Dark Horse Presents # 100-3 (August 1995): "Concrete: The Artistic Impulse"

- Curt Swan

Superman Annual # 9 (1983): "I Flew With Superman"

== T ==
- Romeo Tanghal

The New Teen Titans #20 (June 1982): "A Titanic Tale of Titans' Tomfoolery!"

- Dann Thomas

What If #13 (Feb. 1979): "What If Conan the Barbarian Walked the Earth in the Twentieth Century?"

- Jean Thomas

Sub-Mariner #19 (November 1969): "Support Your Local Sting-Ray!"
The Avengers #83 (Dec. 1970): "Come on In... The Revolution's Fine!"

- Roy Thomas

Fantastic Four Special #5 (Nov. 1967): "This is a Plot?" *
The Amazing Spider-Man Special #5 (Nov. 1968): "Here We Go-a-Plotting" *
Sub-Mariner #19 (November 1969): "Support Your Local Sting-Ray!"
The Avengers #83 (Dec. 1970): "Come on In... The Revolution's Fine!"
Marvel Feature #2 (March 1972): "Nightmare on Bald Mountain"
Iron Man #72 (January 1975): "Convention of Fear!"
Iron Man #85 (April 1976): "...And The Freak Shall Inherit the Earth"
Fantastic Four #176 (Nov. 1976): "Improbable As It May Seem – The Impossible Man Is Back in Town!"
Thunder Bunny #1 (Jan. 1984), "The Greatest Story Ever Told"
Freedom Fighters # 9 (Aug 1987), "Blitzkrieg at Buffalo"
Sgt. Fury and his Howling Commandos Special #6 (Aug. 1970): "Through the Past Darkly"
Sgt. Fury and his Howling Commandos #100 (July 1972): "100th Anniversary!"
Strange Tales featuring Warlock #181 (Aug. 1975): "1000 Clowns"
The Amazing Spider-Man newspaper strip, March 23, 2019

- Frank Thorne

Cerebus the Aardvark #3 (Apr–May 1978): "Song of Red Sophia"
Thunder Bunny #1 (Jan. 1984), "The Greatest Story Ever Told"

- Bruce Timm

Harley Quinn Invades Comic-Con International San Diego #1 (Sept 2014)

- Kathe Todd

Those Annoying Post Brothers #27 (1992), "Con Job"

- Anthony Tollin

Detective Comics #482 (February–March 1979): "Bat-Mite's New York Adventure"

- Herb Trimpe

Sub-Mariner #19 (November 1969): "Support Your Local Sting-Ray!"
Marvel Premiere #24 (Sept. 1975): "Summerkill"

- George Tuska

The Dreamer by Will Eisner (1986)

== U ==
- Albert Uderzo

Asterix and the Class Act (2003)
Asterix and the Missing Scroll (2015)

== V ==
- Willy Vandersteen

Suske en Wiske: "De Zeven Snaren" (1968), "De Belhamel-bende" (1982).

- Irene Vartanoff

Marvel Premiere #24 (Sept. 1975): "Summerkill"
Iron Man #85 (April 1976): "...And The Freak Shall Inherit the Earth"

- Brian K. Vaughan

Invincible #15 (July 2004)
Ex Machina #40 (February 2009): "Ruthless"

- John Verpoorten

Sub-Mariner #19 (November 1969): "Support Your Local Sting-Ray!"
Iron Man #85 (April 1976): "...And The Freak Shall Inherit the Earth"
Fantastic Four #176 (Nov. 1976): "Improbable As It May Seem – The Impossible Man Is Back in Town!"

- Duffy Vohland

The Complete Rog 2000 (1982): "The Coming of the Gang"

- Ricardo Villamonte

Crystar #5 (January 1984): "The Story They Said Couldn't Be Done!"

== W ==
- Lori Walls

Pep Comics #400 (May 1985): "Pep 400"

- Bill Walton

Uncanny Tales #28 (January 1955): "Wiped Out!"

- Kathleen Webb

Archie Giant Series Magazine Presents Pep Comics #614 (October 1990): "All in a Day's... Work?"

- Glynis Wein

Justice League of America #103 (Dec. 1972): "A Stranger Walks among Us!"
Amazing Adventures #16 (Jan. 1973): "And the Juggernaut Will Get You... If You Don't Watch Out!"
Thor #207 (Jan. 1973): "Firesword!"
Werewolf By Night #9 (September 1973): "Terror Beneath the Earth!"
Marvel Premiere #24 (Sept. 1975): "Summerkill"

- Len Wein

Batman #237 (Dec. 1971): "Night of the Reaper"
Justice League of America #103 (Dec. 1972): "A Stranger Walks among Us!"
Amazing Adventures #16 (Jan. 1973): "And the Juggernaut Will Get You... If You Don't Watch Out!"
Thor #207 (Jan. 1973): "Firesword!"
Werewolf By Night #9 (September 1973): "Terror Beneath the Earth!"
Marvel Premiere #24 (Sept. 1975): "Summerkill"
Iron Man #85 (April 1976): "...And The Freak Shall Inherit the Earth"
Fantastic Four #176 (Nov. 1976): "Improbable As It May Seem – The Impossible Man Is Back in Town!"
Freedom Fighters #9 (Aug 1977), "Blitzkrieg at Buffalo!"
Peter Parker, The Spectacular Spider-Man #48 (November 1980): "Double Defeat!"
The New Teen Titans #20 (June 1982): "A Titanic Tale of Titans' Tomfoolery!"
DC Challenge #2 (December 1985): "The DC Challenge: Phase Two - Blinded By The Light"
Wonder Woman vol. 2, #8 (September 1987), p. 20: "Time Passages"

- Mort Weisinger

Action Comics #55 (Dec. 1942): "A Goof Named Tiny Rufe"
The Inferior Five #6 (Jan.-Feb. 1968): "How to Make a Bomb!"

- Alan Weiss

Batman #237 (Dec. 1971): "Night of the Reaper"

- Ogden Whitney

Big Shot Comics vol. 8, #81 (September 1947): "The Skyman"

- Bob Wiacek

Man-Thing vol. 2, #11 (July 1981): "Hell's Gate"

- George Wildman

Popeye #E14 (1972): "Popeye and Fine Arts and Humanities Careers"

- Bonnie Wilford

X-Men #98 (April 1976): "Merry Christmas, X-Men..."
X-Men #105 (June 1977): "The Flame, The Frenzy... and Firelord", pp. 10 and 11
Iron Fist #15 (Sept. 1977): "Enter the X-Men"

- Brittney Williams

Patsy Walker A.K.A. Hellcat! issues 7-8 (August and September 2016)

- Ron Wilson

The Thing #7 (January 1984): "What Th'!?"

- Renée Witterstaetter

Sensational She-Hulk #40 (April, 1992)
Sensational She-Hulk #43 (September, 1992): "Battle? Why?"
Sensational She-Hulk #50: (April 1993): "He's Dead?!"
Sensational She-Hulk #60 (December, 1993): "Bug Hunt"

- Bill Woggon

Wilbur #13 (June 1947): "Katy Keene The Pin-up Queen"
Wilbur #19 (June 1948): "Katy Keene"
Katy Keene #1 (1949): "Congratulations to Katy Keene..."
Katy Keene #8 (1952): "The Candy Kid"
Katy Keene #14 (1954): "A Short Pig Tale"

- Marv Wolfman

Fantastic Four #176 (Nov. 1976): "Improbable As It May Seem – The Impossible Man Is Back in Town!"
Freedom Fighters # 9 (Aug 1987), "Blitzkrieg at Buffalo"
The New Teen Titans #20 (June 1982): "A Titanic Tale of Titans' Tomfoolery!"
Marvel Premiere #24 (Sept. 1975): "Summerkill"

- Bob Wood

Crime Does Not Pay #30 (November 1943): "Inside Story"

- Wally Wood

Weird Science 22 (1953): "My World"

- Bernie Wrightson

Batman #237 (Dec. 1971): "Night of the Reaper"

== Y ==
- Bill Yoshida

Pep Comics #400 (May 1985): "Pep 400"
Archie Giant Series Magazine Presents Pep Comics #614 (October 1990): "All in a Day's... Work?"

- Catherine Yronwode

Miracleman #8 (June 1986)
The Spirit #30 (Kitchen Sink Press, 1981)

== Z ==
- Ron Zalme

Uncanny X-Men Annual #7 (1983): "Scavenger Hunt"

- Chip Zdarsky

Howard the Duck #10 (October 2016): "...Hell If I Know..." (as "Chipp")

- Mike Zeck

Captain America #289 (Jan. 1984): Cover
