= Fort Vancouver High School =

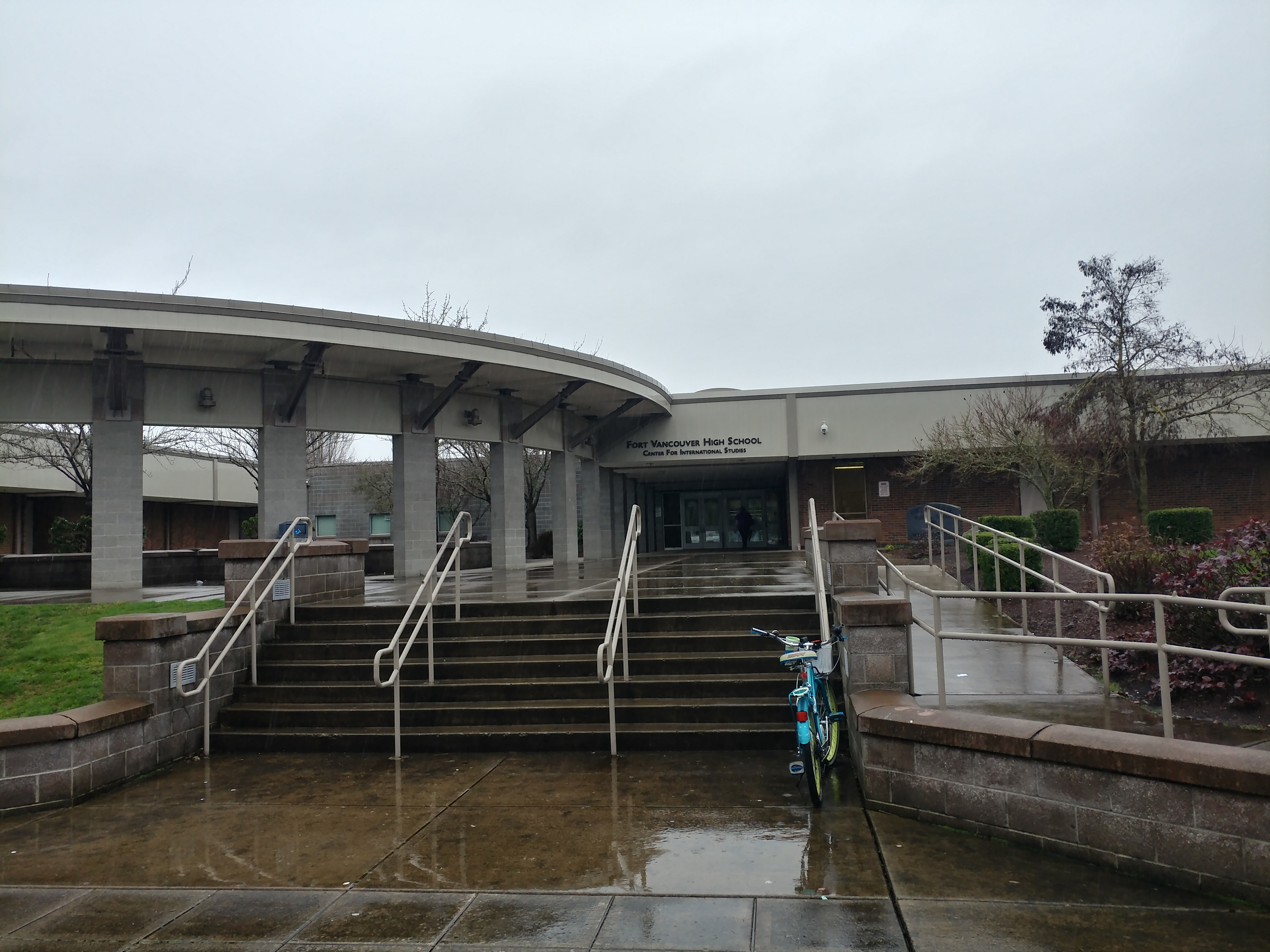
- FVHS main entrance

Location
- 5700 E 18th Street; Vancouver, Clark County, Washington 98661; United States; 45.636111°N 122.612317°W

Information
- Type: Public
- School district: Vancouver Public Schools
- Principal: Curt Scheidel
- Teaching staff: 77.61 (FTE)
- Grades: 9-12
- Enrollment: 1,365 (2023-2024)
- Student to teacher ratio: 17.59
- Colors: Red, white, and black
- Athletics conference: WIAA Greater St. Helens 2A
- Mascot: Trapper John and Trapper Jane
- Team name: Trappers
- Website: fort.vansd.org

Fort Vancouver High School, known as FVHS and Fort Vancouver High School Center for International Studies, is a public high school located in Vancouver, Washington. FVHS is named after Fort Vancouver, an early trading outpost built in 1824-25 near the banks of the Columbia River, a few miles from where the school is located. The FVHS symbol is the Trapper, in reference to the fur trade in the early 19th century by such groups as Hudson's Bay Company voyageurs.

== History ==
Originally named Vancouver High School, the institution opened in 1888. Classes were first held in the basement of Central School. During 1905–1913, classes were held in the old Franklin School building, then from 1913–1970 in its own building at West 26th street and Main Street (what is now the southwest corner of Main Street and Fourth Plain Boulevard). The first graduating class was in June 1891, when 12 students (9 girls and 3 boys) received their diplomas. By 1912, 276 students had received diplomas from the high school, before the permanent Vancouver High School was even opened for the 1912–1913 school year. In 1956, the Vancouver School District changed the name to Fort Vancouver High School when a second high school, Hudson's Bay, was built just outside of downtown Vancouver, near Clark College. In the fall of 1970, Fort Vancouver High School moved to its present site in a new building at 5700 E. 18th Street. In 1973, against much public protest, the classical three-story brick former Vancouver high school building was demolished. In the late 1990s, most of the original interior of the present Fort Vancouver High School building was gutted, reconfigured and rebuilt.

== Sports ==
Fort Vancouver participates in the Greater St. Helens 2A league and is a member of the Washington Interscholastic Athletics Association (WIAA).

=== State championships ===
- Baseball: 1990
- Boys Basketball: 1938
- Boys Track: 1956

== Current ==
Fort Vancouver High School has 86 teachers serving a little more than 1500 students. Students at Fort Vancouver have diverse backgrounds and economic status. 16.8% of the students are in Fort Vancouver's ELL (English Language Learning) program and 11.9% are in Special Education. Approximately one-third of Fort Vancouver's students speak a language other than English when at home. Fort Vancouver High School is the only high school in Vancouver School District with an ELL (English Language Learning) program.

== Magnets ==
Fort Vancouver High School is home to several of the Vancouver School District's "magnet" programs. The Legal, Medical, Culinary Arts, Industrial Arts, and ELL magnets draw students to FVHS for specialized education programs.

The legal magnet is no longer in function at FVHS. Although, their Mock Trial program has for the past 22 years, been the district champion, moving on to the state, and on several occasions, the national level. In the 2012 district competition, they came in first place. The FVHS Legal Magnet is also one of two public high schools in the nation to have a functioning courtroom facility on its campus. The court room is no longer used for actual judicial proceedings from the Washington State Court of Appeals and the Clark County Student Traffic Court.

The Medical Magnet, founded also in 1992, strives to give students an in-depth knowledge of the medical field. Many students who enroll in the program go on to college to pursue degrees in the medical field. The medical magnet leads the students of the FVHS Red Cross Club in organizing blood drives and humanitarian aid projects.

The Culinary Arts Program at FVHS, founded in 1972, is the oldest magnet at FVHS. Students in this program gain a comprehensive knowledge of the hospitality industry as well as the experience of cooking during their class time. Many will intern at the cafes in the VSD headquarters.

The Industrial Arts Magnet provides students with an introduction to the skills necessary for a successful career in the manual trades. Students also gain knowledge of the artistic and practical side of welding and machine technologies.

In the ELL Program, students from diverse backgrounds come together here to learn a common language and culture, to become better acclimated with America. Fort Vancouver has students from all over the world speaking a large variety of languages and it is in the ELL Magnet that a melting pot of world cultures comes together so that students can learn from one another. Starting 2016, the school has renamed the program as Center for International Studies. The school is a member of the Asia Society's International Studies Schools Network, a consortium of schools throughout the U.S. that are committed to developing global competence.

== Other programs ==
Students at Fort Vancouver High School can also be involved in Running Start, which allows students to receive both college and high school credits while attending Clark College. Students may also take advantage of vocational programs offered through Clark College. Additionally, some classes at FVHS offer credit through the WSU-Vancouver campus.

== Notable alumni ==
- Eric Michael Cole - 1994, actor
- Travis Claridge - 1995, NFL, offensive guard
- Steve Dils - 1974, NFL quarterback
- Al Fagaly - 1928, golden age cartoonist (There Oughta be a Law! comic strip, Archie, Super Duck)
- Brian Hunter (outfielder) - 1989, MLB center fielder
- Jim Moeller - 1973, Washington State House of Representatives
- Craig Pridemore - 1979, Washington State Senate
- Jon Shields - 1982, NFL offensive guard
- Lisa Spangler - 2015, mixed martial arts fighter
