= Jackpot Comics =

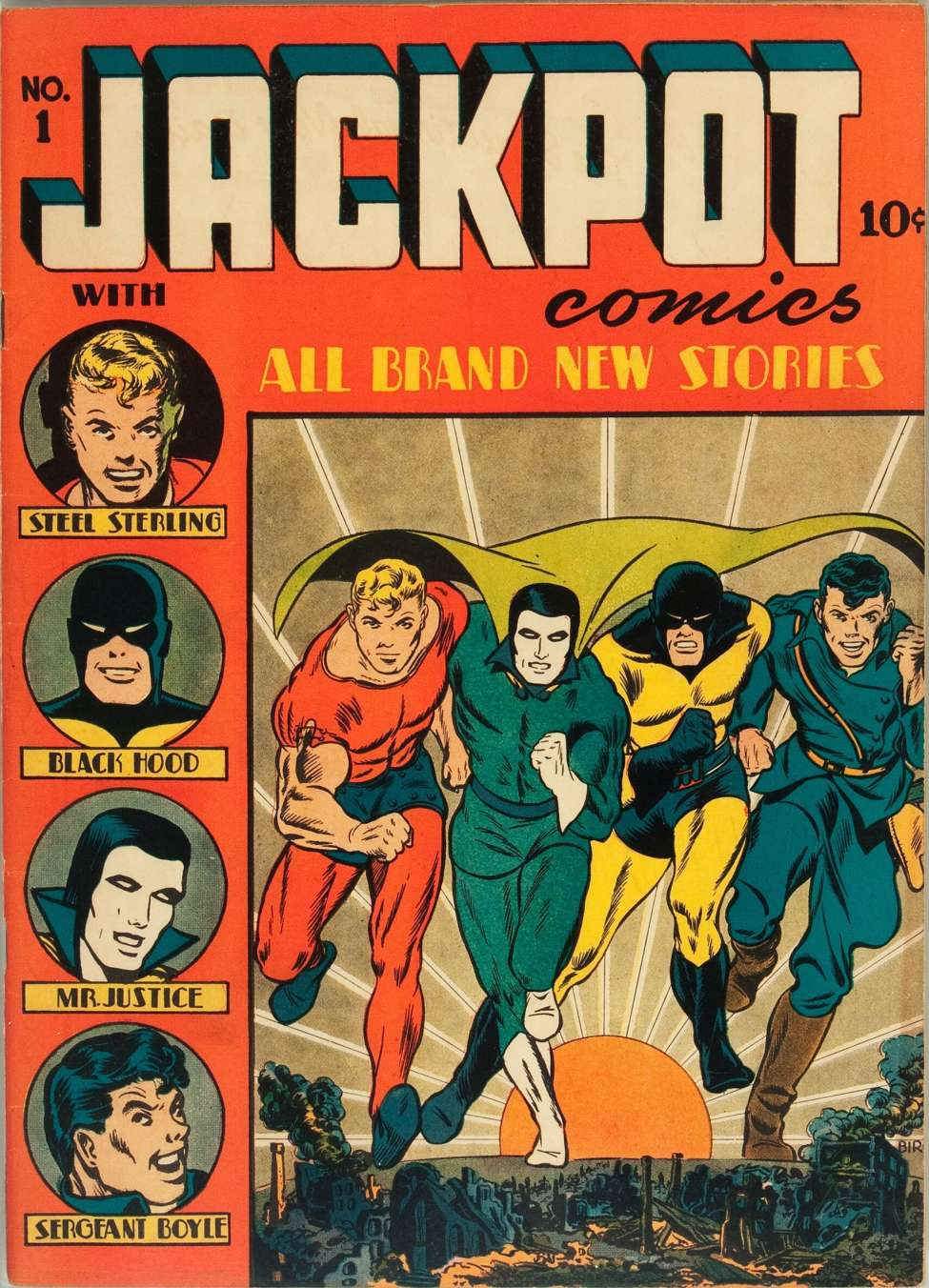
- Cover of Jackpot Comics 1

Publication information
- Publisher: MLJ Magazines Inc
- Schedule: Quarterly
- Publication date: Spring 1941 – Spring 1943
- No. of issues: 9
- Main character(s): Steel Sterling; Black Hood; Mr Justice; Sergeant Boyle; Archie

Jackpot Comics is the name of an American anthology comic book magazine series published by MLJ Magazines Inc., more commonly known as MLJ Comics, for nine issues between Spring 1941 and Spring 1943. It featured new stories of a number of characters previously seen in other MLJ publications.

== Publication history ==
Jackpot Comics was published by MLJ Magazines Inc., the precursor to what would become the publisher Archie Comics. It featured a number of MLJ's existing characters from their other titles, Blue Ribbon Comics, Top-Notch Comics and Pep Comics: Steel Sterling written by Joe Blair and drawn by Irv Novick, Black Hood, Mr Justice by Joe Blair and Sam Cooper and Sergeant Boyle by Charles Biro. Each issue contained at least one one-page text story of either Steel Sterling or Black Hood, and sometimes both, to satisfy U.S. Postal Service requirements for magazine rates; all comic books did this through the early 1960s. The Sergeant Boyle stories in the first two issues also featured Corporal Collins, who had his own series, "Corporal Collins, Infantryman", in Blue Ribbon Comics at the same time. The series was edited by Harry Shorten.

Beginning with issue #4 (Winter 1941/2) Jackpot also featured Archie and his gang, written and drawn by Bob Montana. Archie's stories in Jackpot Comics are notable for featuring the first appearance of his friend Reggie Mantle; originally named 'Scotty' in #5 (Spring 1942), and then Reggie in #6 (Summer 1942). From issue #5, the Steel Sterling supporting characters Clancey and Looney had their own humor strip for two issues, while later issues featured other humor strips: "Senor Siesta" by Don Dean in issue #7 (Autumn 1942), "Cubby the Bear" in #8 and "It Shouldn't Happen to a Dog" in #8–9, all by Joe Edwards, and "Porkchops" in #9.

With issue #10 (Summer 1943), Jackpot Comics changed its title to Jolly Jingles and also changed focus: Instead of being a "best of" anthology of the company's characters, it was now an anthology of original talking animal characters. Issue #10 introduced Super Duck, the company's longest-lasting talking animal character. The series was canceled with #16 (Winter 1944–1945), and Super Duck was given his own title.

It has not been revived since. However, in August 2009 Michael Uslan announced that five one-off comics reviving the Archie-as-superhero 'Pureheart' concept would be released in 2010, one of those titles being Jackpot Comics.

== External sources ==
- All nine issues of Jackpot Comics
