= Marvelous Maureen =

- Marvelous Maureen, as drawn by Lori Walls.

Publication information
- Publisher: Archie Comics
- First appearance: Pep Comics #383 (Apr. 1982)
- Created by: Lori Walls

In-story information
- Species: Human
- Place of origin: Earth
- Notable aliases: Captain Maureen

Marvelous Maureen is a comic book character created by Lori Walls who appeared in comics published by Archie Comics. She first appeared in Pep Comics #383 (Apr. 1982). Her adventures were all scripted and penciled by Walls, with most stories being inked by Jon D'Agostino. Marvelous Maureen's adventures are in the vein of a humorous science fiction soap opera, with an ongoing storyline that ultimately stretched over twenty episodes. Trina Robbins & Catherine Yronwode described the Marvelous Maureen stories as "light-hearted and fanciful," but ultimately felt that the feature bore "little resemblance to the Archie school humor-style." After appearing in almost every issue of Pep from Apr. 1982 to Sept. 1985, the character never appeared again.

== Publication history ==
Marvelous Maureen was featured as a backup story (generally in six-page installments), in every issue of Pep Comics from #383 (Apr. 1982) to #402 (Sept. 1985), except issue #400 (which was a special commemorative issue featuring a self-reflexive story where Archie and the gang go to the Archie Comics offices in Mamaroneck to discuss possible ideas for Pep Comics #400). Maureen's adventures also appeared in four consecutive issues of Laugh Comics from Nov. 1982–July 1983. In addition, a crossword featuring Maureen was printed in Archie's Pals 'n' Gals, #164 (June 1983). Altogether, more than 140 pages of "Marvelous Maureen" content were published.

Each episode of "Marvelous Maureen" ended with a caption box urging readers to send in ideas for costumes, weapons, spaceships, and monsters to the Archie offices.

== Background ==
Lori Walls is the sister of Jeannette Walls, author of the memoir The Glass Castle. The character Marvelous Maureen is named after their younger sister Maureen Walls. Lori Walls was working in-house at Archie when she was given the reins of "Marvelous Maureen."

Other than Marvelous Maureen, the only other comics credits by Lori Walls were published by Archie Comics during the same period 1982–1985, mostly being activity pages, puzzles, and the like:

- "Everyday Gremlins," Archie's Mad House #130 (Oct. 1982) — 3 p.
- "Valley Girl Fashions," Betty and Veronica #324 (June 1983) — 2 pp.
- "Betty and Veronica's Breezy Summer Fashions," Archie Giant Series #529 (Aug. 1983) — 2 pp.
- "Puzzle Page!," Pep Comics #400 (May 1985)
- Pep Comics #400 (May 1985) — contributed artwork to a company-wide jam

== Character biography and storyline ==
Maureen is a normal Los Angeles teenager obsessed with sports, rock music, clothes, and comic books. She is blonde and wears glasses. One day she discovers an abandoned alien spaceship (the Gypsy Moth) in her back yard, gets in, and blasts off. She soon discovers a spacesuit inside the ship, and donning it, becomes Captain Maureen/Marvelous Maureen. Along with her sidekick, Mortimer (see below), she battles the Grossniks, a bug-like alien race.

Mortimer (introduced in Pep #383, Apr. 1982) — a gloomy human-dog hybrid alien with a lion's tail.

Gumbrayne (introduced in Pep #384, June 1982) — the main antagonist, leader of the Grossniks, who bears a strong resemblance to Darth Vader without his helmet.

Silver Beetle (introduced in Pep #384, June 1982) — a robot that sings parodies of Beatles songs. (An early incarnation of The Beatles was known as "The Silver Beatles.")

Wonder Blunder (introduced in Pep #385, Aug. 1982) — a silly man dressed in a caped costume who is part of "The United Group of Humans." Often referred to as "W.B.," Wonder Blunder is a sort of love interest for Maureen and (later) Clarissa. Wonder Blunder was created by reader Keith Kaplan of New York City.

Clarissa DuBois (introduced in Laugh Comics #376, Jan. 1983) — a teenage girl (who claims to be a witch) from the planet Izod who becomes Maureen's ally and then "frenemy."

Reptilicus (introduced in Laugh Comics #376, Jan. 1983) — reptilian humanoid who befriends Maureen and becomes part of the gang. Created by reader Michael Hyden of Oklahoma City.

Monsiour DuBois (introduced in Pep #388, Mar. 1983) — Clarissa's father, who is turned into a slime monster during their adventures.

== List of appearances ==
- (episode 1) "Marvelous Maureen Blasts Off, or The Goldilocks Syndrome," Pep Comics #383 (Apr. 1982)
- (episode 2) "Marvelous Maureen Fights the Grossniks, or Shelf-Preservation," Pep Comics #384 (June 1982)
- (episode 3) "Marvelous Maureen Jumps Bail, or the Jailhouse Balk," Pep Comics #385 (Aug. 1982)
- (episode 4) "Marvelous Maureen Annoys the Grossniks, or The Great Brake-Away," Pep Comics #386 (Oct. 1982)
- "Fantasy Fashion," Pep Comics #386 (Oct. 1982)
- (episode 5) "Marvelous Maureen Goes Shopping," Laugh Comics #375 (November 1982)
- (episode 6) "Marvelous Maureen Makes a New Friend, or City Fights," Pep Comics #387 (Dec. 1982)
- (episode 7) "Marvelous Maureen Maintains Her Minerals," Laugh Comics #376 (Jan. 1983)
- "Jabberjaw's City Street Map," Laugh Comics #376 (Jan. 1983)
- (episode 8) "Marvelous Maureen Takes a Bath, or Pendulums Are the Pits," Pep Comics #388 (Mar. 1983)
- (episode 9) "Marvelous Maureen Grabs a Car," Laugh Comics #377 (Apr. 1983)
- (episode 10) "Marvelous Maureen Ditches Her Guests," Pep Comics #389 (June 1983)
- "A Cross Word From a Dragon," Archie's Pals 'n' Gals #164 (June 1983)
- (episode 11) "Marvelous Maureen Argues with an ANJ!," Laugh Comics #378 (July 1983)
- (episode 12) "Marvelous Maureen Learns Her Alphabet, or Biding the Bullets," Pep Comics #390 (Sept. 1983)
- (episode 13) "Marvelous Maureen Turns Up Again, or Over Easy, Please," Pep Comics #391 (Nov. 1983)
- (episode 14) "Marvelous Maureen Knows Her Nutrients," Pep Comics #392 (Jan. 1984)
- "Episode 15: Marvelous Maureen Gets Off Her High Horse, or Spies and Seek," Pep Comics #393 (Mar. 1984)
- "Episode 16: Wards a Whammy, or "When Diplomacy Fails, Fire Works"," Pep Comics #394 (May 1984)
- "Episode 17: Marvelous Maureen Wakes Up Mortimer, or 'DuBois' New Bod," Pep Comics #395 (July 1984)
- "Episode 18: Marvelous Maureen Makes a Transfer, or a Dud Plan," Pep Comics #396 (Sept. 1984)
- (episode 19) "Instant Inedibles," Pep Comics #397 (Nov. 1984)
- (episode 20) "Roc Beat," Pep Comics #398 (Jan. 1985)
- (episode 21) "Rescue Party Poopers," Pep Comics #399 (Mar. 1985)
- (episode 22) "Bugs a la Carte," Pep Comics #401 (July 1985)
- (episode 23) "Marvelous Maureen: The Cut-Rate Red Carpet," Pep Comics #402 (Sept. 1985)

== See also ==
- List of comics creators appearing in comics
- "Amazing Amy" a.k.a. Amy Elliott Dunne of Gone Girl
