= Black Hood (radio) =

Radio program

- Other names: The Black Hood
- Genre: adventure radio serial, crime serial
- Running time: 15 minutes
- Country of origin: United States
- Language(s): English
- Home station: Mutual Broadcasting System
- Starring: Scott Douglas, Marjorie Cramer
- Original release: July 5, 1943 – January 14, 1944
- No. of episodes: 120.
- Opening theme: The Sorcerer's Apprentice (Paul Dukas)
- Sponsored by: none.

Black Hood was an American radio serial based on the popularity of the US superhero comics series Black Hood. It was broadcast on the Mutual Broadcasting System July 5, 1943 – January 14, 1944.

== Concept ==
Rookie police officer Kip Burland had a secret identity, the Black Hood. Donning a specific, "specially developed" black hood gave Burland special magical powers. The only person who knew about Burland's secret identity was Barbara Sutton, a newspaper reporter who helped him fight crime.

The American comics series Black Hood had been a popular comic strip since its first appearance in the ninth issue of Top-Notch Comics in October 1940. On July 5, 1943, a radio serial debuted on the Mutual Broadcasting System. It aired in episodes of 15 minutes and five times a week, at 5:15 in the afternoon. The opening theme music was a snippet from Paul Dukas's The Sorcerer's Apprentice.

Compared to the source material the radio serial was less violent and sexually suggestive. The show also introduced a third character, Police Sergeant McGinty.

120 episodes were recorded. Because it failed to find a sponsor its last broadcast was January 14, 1944. Only one audio copy has survived, the initial episode "Emerald Voodoo Ring" which was recorded as the audition disc.

== Cast ==
- The Black Hood: Scott Douglas
- Kip Burland: Scott Douglas
- Barbara "Babs" Sutton: Marjorie Cramer

== See also ==
- The Adventures of Superman
- The Green Hornet
- The Shadow
