= Harry Shorten =

- Born: October 5, 1914 New York City, US
- Died: January 14, 1991 (aged 76) Fort Lauderdale, Florida, US
- Areas: Writer, Editor, Publisher
- Pseudonym: Cliff Campbell
- Notable works: There Oughta Be a Law! Archie Comics; Tower Comics
- Spouse: Rose Sadoff

Harry Shorten (1914–1991) was an American writer, editor, and book publisher best known for the syndicated gag cartoon There Oughta Be a Law!, as well as his work with Archie Comics, and his long association with Archie's publishers Louis Silberkleit and John L. Goldwater. From the late 1950s until his 1982 retirement, Shorten was a book publisher, overseeing such companies as Leisure Books, Midwood Books, Midwood-Tower Publications, Belmont Tower, and Roband Publications.

== Biography ==
=== Early life and education ===
Shorten was born in New York City, the son of Russian/Polish immigrants Joseph and Leah Shorten. He attended Thomas Jefferson High School in Brooklyn.

Shorten attended New York University, where he played halfback for the football team and acquired the nickname "Streaky." He graduated from NYU in 1937 with a degree in geology.

After graduation, Shorten played professional football for a couple of years. He also wrote a book (with football coach Mal Stevens), called How to Watch a Football Game (Leisure League of America, 1937).

=== MLJ Comics ===
Shorten began his career as a writer with the pulp magazine publisher Columbia Publications (co-owned by Silberkleit) before moving on to MLJ Comics (later known as Archie Comic Publications). As a writer, Shorten co-created a number of superheroes for MLJ. In January 1940, with artist Irv Novick, Shorten created the Shield, the first USA patriotic comic book hero. That same year, Shorten also co-created with artist Bob Wood The Firefly. The Black Hood, another 1940 Shorten creation, became a popular character and in 1943 was given his own title, Black Hood Comics. Shorten occasionally used the MLJ house pen name "Cliff Campbell" for his comics writing, but didn't do much writing for MLJ after 1941 because of his editorial duties.

In 1940, Shorten was named managing editor at MLJ. Titles Shorten edited at MLJ included Blue Ribbon Comics, Shield-Wizard Comics, Pep Comics, Top-Notch Comics, Black Hood Comics, Hangman Comics, Jackpot Comics, and Zip Comics. He stayed at MLJ until 1957.

=== There Oughta Be a Law! ===
In 1944, while still at MLJ, Shorten made his fortune by creating a gag cartoon called There Oughta Be a Law!, with illustrator Al Fagaly. The panel was highly derivative of Jimmy Hatlo's They'll Do It Every Time. The panel was syndicated by McClure Newspaper Syndicate; eventually, it incorporated reader ideas (including elected politicians who wrote in with suggestions). Shorten provided the scripts, Fagaly the art. There Oughta Be a Law! ran from 1944–1984; Fagaly died in 1963, Shorten provided scripts until 1970, and the strip was later produced by Frank Borth, Warren Whipple, and Mort Gerberg.

=== Charlton Comics ===
Shorten wrote some mystery and war titles for Charlton Comics from 1952 to 1957.

=== Paperback publisher ===
In 1957, looking for an investment in the financial results of his comics, Shorten decided to publish and edit pulp paperbacks; he co-founded two publishers: Midwood Books and Leisure Books. He wanted to follow the example of publishers like Beacon Books and Universal Distributing, which specialized in cheap, lightweight books telling dramatic or erotic romances (with suggestive covers), for male audiences. Shorten did not know much about literature or good books, but he knew what would entice the average American reader. His books were bright, colorful, and eye-catching.

From 1957 to 1962, Shorten was publisher of Midwood Books (a division of the Louis Silberkleit-owned Tower Publications). The company was named after Shorten's neighborhood of Midwood, Brooklyn; the publishing house itself was headquartered at 505 Eighth Avenue in Manhattan (along with fellow paperback genre publisher Lancer Books).

Midwood's first release were paperback collections of Shorten's There Oughta be a Law comic strips, and an unnumbered book series in the same style as Beacon. Contributors included Loren Beaucham (a.k.a. Robert Silverberg), Sheldon Lord (a.k.a. Lawrence Block), Alan Marshall (a.k.a. Donald E. Westlake), and Clyde Allison. Cover artists included Rudy Nappi and Paul Rader.

The covers sold the books: many pages contained sex scenes full of insinuations and veiled references, and artists such as Nappi, Rader, and Robert Maguire were significant to Midwood's success.

In 1964,Tower Publications merged Midwood into a new subsidiary, Midwood-Tower, and formed the comic book publisher Tower Comics. Shorten went on to be managing editor of Tower Comics.

In 1971, Tower acquired the assets of Belmont Books, merging the two companies to form Belmont Tower. (Belmont had been founded by all three Archie Comic Publications founders: Silberkleit, John L. Goldwater, and Maurice Coyne.) Although the new line continued to publish fiction, Belmont Tower published many notable nonfiction books from 1971 to 1980.

Tower ceased publishing in 1982; Shorten retired shortly thereafter.

From 1957 until his 1982 retirement, Shorten was publisher of Leisure Books, a mass market paperback publisher specializing in thrillers, Westerns, fantasy, and science fiction. The company also published the Wildlife Treasury card series. When Shorten retired in 1982, Leisure Books was acquired by Dorchester Publishing, which changed Leisure's focus to horror titles; the publisher closed down in 2010.

=== Tower Comics ===
From 1965–1969, Shorten was managing editor of Tower Comics. Shorten "cut a dream deal with comic book artist Wally Wood" in which Shorten would be the managing editor and "Wood would be granted a wide latitude of creative and business freedom devoid of a 9-to-5 office job or hefty administrative duties, and be allowed to concentrate on creating characters and concepts for an expanding line of superhero comics." When it became obvious Wood could not handle the volume of material Shorten wanted to publish, Shorten hired Samm Schwartz, who had worked for many years as an Archie Comics artist. Schwartz handled the scheduling of all the material and assignments of scripts and art other than Wood's own.

Tower was most notable for Wood's T.H.U.N.D.E.R. Agents; notable creators associated with Tower included Wood, Schwartz, Dan Adkins, Gil Kane, Reed Crandall, Steve Ditko, Richard Bassford, Len Brown, Steve Skeates, Larry Ivie, Bill Pearson, Russ Jones, Roger Brand, and Tim Battersby-Brent. The company went defunct in 1969.

=== Daytime television industry ===
Some time in the late 1960s Shorten founded Roband Productions, which published, among others, Afternoon TV magazine, devoted to soap operas and daytime television. Afternoon TV administered the Daytime TV Soap Awards, a precursor to the Daytime Emmy Awards. Afternoon TV published from c. 1970 to c. 1984.

== Retirement and death ==
Shorten retired in 1982, moving from Rockville Center, Long Island, to Pompano Beach, Florida. He and his wife Rose had two daughters. Shorten died from the effects of a stroke on January 14, 1991; he was 76 years old.

== Bibliography ==
- How to Watch a Football Game, with Mal Stevens (Leisure League of America, 1937)
- There Oughta Be a Law! series
  - There Oughta Be a Law!, with Al Fagaly (Hasbrouck Heights, N.J.: Graphic Publications, 1952) — introduction by Danny Kaye; reprinted in 1966 by Tower Publications
  - There Oughta Be a Law no. 4, with Al Fagaly (Midwood, 1958)
  - There Oughta Be a Law (New York: Roband Productions, 19??)
  - There Oughta Be a Law (New York: Belmont Books, 1969, 1971)
  - There Oughta Be a Law (New York: Modern Promotions [A Unisystems Company], 1970, 1971) — a "unibook"
  - Harry Shorten's There Oughta be a Law (Belmont Tower, 1974)
  - There Oughta be a Law (New York: Belmont Tower, 1976)
