= Jon Shields =

American football player (born 1964)

No. 63
- Position: Offensive guard

Personal information
- Born: April 30, 1964 (age 62); Vancouver, Washington
- Listed height: 6 ft 5 in (1.96 m)
- Listed weight: 293 lb (133 kg)

Career information
- High school: Fort Vancouver
- College: Portland State
- NFL draft: 1987: undrafted

Career history
- Los Angeles Rams (1987)*; Dallas Cowboys (1987); Los Angeles Rams (1988)*
- * Offseason or practice squad member only

Awards and highlights
- Second-team All-Western Football Conference (1986)

Career NFL statistics
- Games played: 1
- Stats at Pro Football Reference

Jon Rayborn Shields (born April 30, 1964) is an American former professional football player who was an offensive guard for the Dallas Cowboys of the National Football League. He played college football for the Portland State Vikings.

== Early life ==
Shields attended Fort Vancouver High School. He accepted a football scholarship from NCAA Division II Portland State University.

As a sophomore, he was a backup that alternated between the right and left tackle position. As a junior, he was named the starter at right tackle.

As a senior, he received second-team All-Western Football Conference honors.

== Professional career ==
=== Los Angeles Rams (first stint) ===
Shields was signed as an undrafted free agent by the Los Angeles Rams after the 1987 NFL draft on April 27. He was waived before the start of the season on September 7.

=== Dallas Cowboys ===
After the NFLPA strike was declared on the third week of the 1987 season, those contests were canceled (reducing the 16 game season to 15) and the NFL decided that the games would be played with replacement players. In September, he was signed to be a part of the Dallas replacement team that was given the mock name "Rhinestone Cowboys" by the media. He was a backup at right guard during the three strike games and played offensive snaps against the Philadelphia Eagles. He was cut on October 20, at the end of the strike.

=== Los Angeles Rams (second stint) ===
On March 8, 1988, he signed as a free agent with the Rams. On July 24, it was reported in the media that he left training camp for personal reasons.
