= Al Fagaly =

American cartoonist

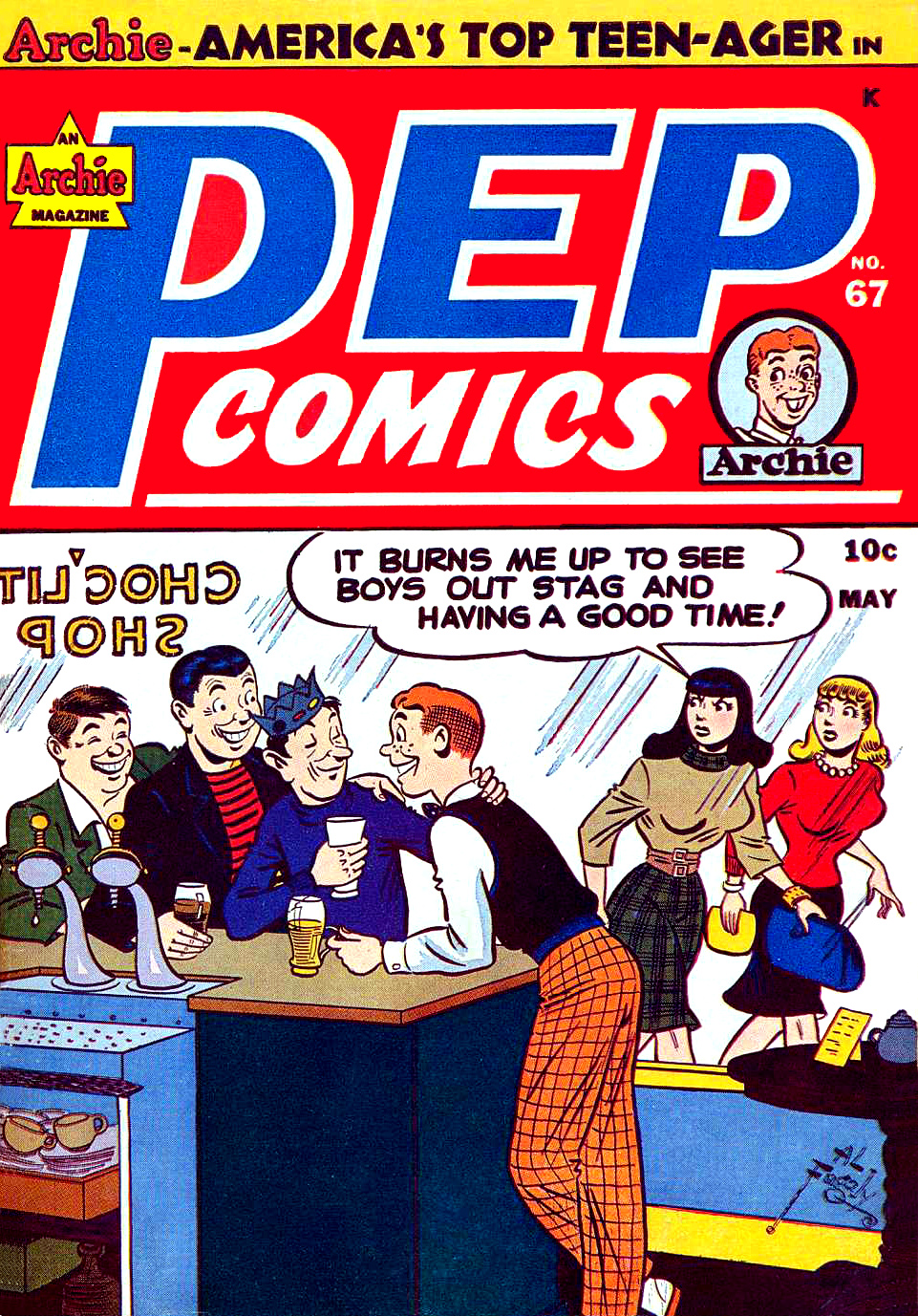
- Al Fagaly cover, Pep Comics number 67, May 1948.
- Born: January 5, 1909 Waynesburg, Kentucky
- Died: April 23, 1963 (aged 54)
- Areas: Cartoonist, Artist
- Notable works: There Oughta Be a Law!

Al Fagaly (January 5, 1909 – April 23, 1963) was a Golden Age American cartoonist and creator of Archie Comics' Super Duck and the syndicated gag cartoon There Oughta Be a Law!

== Biography ==
Born in Waynesburg, Kentucky, his parents were Robert Valentine Fagaly (1873 – 1950) and Laura Belle Hicks Fagaly (1880 – 1960). He was the 7th great-grandson of Sarah Rapelje, the first child of European descent born in New Amsterdam. His 3rd great-grandfather, 1st Lt. Isaac Bogart Jr. served in the 3rd New York Regiment of the Continental Army during the Revolutionary War and his grandfather, William Harrison Hicks fought in the Civil War (71st Ohio). The family moved to Hood River, Oregon around 1911 before settling in Vancouver, Washington. He was a neighbor of Basil Wolverton.

After serving in the United States Marine Corps, Fagaly returned to Vancouver in the mid-1930s and founded Columbia Photoengraving in order to get the local newspaper, The Columbian, to publish his cartoons. He offered to supply the newspaper engraving plates for free if the newspaper would pay him for the cartoons. Since the cost of photoengraving was much more than the going rate for artwork, the newspaper agreed, and Mr. Fagaly became the staff cartoonist for The Columbian. In 1935, he created a comic strip, Skip Logan, for the Thompson Service in Cincinnati, Ohio.

In 1943 Fagaly was a staff artist first at Timely Comics (sharing an apartment with Mickey Spillane) and then at MLJ Comics (now Archie Comics) when he created the Superman parody Super Duck. He went on to be the lead artist on Super Duck Comics, which debuted in 1944; Fagaly was a main contributor to the title at least through the early 1950s. Fagaly was also the main contributor to Fauntleroy Comics, a spin-off from Super Duck that published three annual issues from 1950 to 1952.

In 1944, while he was living in Nantucket, Massachusetts, Fagaly and MLJ managing editor Harry Shorten co-created the daily gag cartoon There Oughta Be a Law!, syndicated by McClure Newspaper Syndicate. Shorten supplied the stories and Fagaly the art, until his death in 1963. There Oughta be a Law! ran from 1944 to 1984, and was later produced by Frank Borth, Warren Whipple, and Mort Gerberg.
