= Richard O'Brien (author) =

American humor writer (1934–2012)

Richard O'Brien (January 13, 1934 – May 18, 2012) was an American humor writer and expert on toy collecting known primarily for his series of books, "O'Brien's Collecting Toys". His "Collecting American-Made Toy Soldiers," published in 1996, has been extensively used by hobbyists.

== Early life and education ==
O'Brien was born in New York City on January 13, 1934. He attended Erasmus High and Brooklyn College, and served a brief stint in the United States Army.

== Career ==
O'Brien worked as a press agent, publicizing clients including comedians Woody Allen, Bill Cosby, Joan Rivers, Victor Borge, Dick Cavett and Rodney Dangerfield. Writing gags for some of his clients led to him ghost authoring the Woody Allen comic strip, "Inside Woody Allen." From 1979 to 1981 he authored the nationally syndicated strip, "Koky," (Chicago Tribune-New York New Syndicate) illustrated by Mort Gerberg, a comic devoted to the life of a working mom.

In 1979, O'Brien closed his publicity business to focus exclusively on writing. He began studying the origins of toy soldiers. O'Brien's research led to the publication of Collecting Toys, released in 1985 by Books Americana. He published eight editions of the book, some of which were under the Krause imprint. He later sold the copyright to Krause and the series was continued under his name with Karen O'Brien (no relation) as editor.

O'Brien wrote many other books on toy topics, including foreign-made toy soldiers, and collectible trucks, cars and trains. He also wrote the coffee-table book "The Story of American Toys." which colorfully illustrates the development of toy production through the decades.

O'Brien also published a number of articles with information about toy-soldier firms, including Barclay, which were later compiled in a series of books available through Ramble House. Several of these articles were later republished in the toy trade magazine, TDmonthly.com.

== Death ==
O'Brien died at a hospice in North Carolina, on May 18, 2012, at the age of 78.
