= Li'l Jinx =

- Li'l Jinx and friends, drawn by Fernando Ruiz
- First appearance: Pep Comics #62 (July 1947)
- Created by: Joe Edwards
- Hometown: Riverdale

In-universe information
- Occupation: Riverdale Elementary student

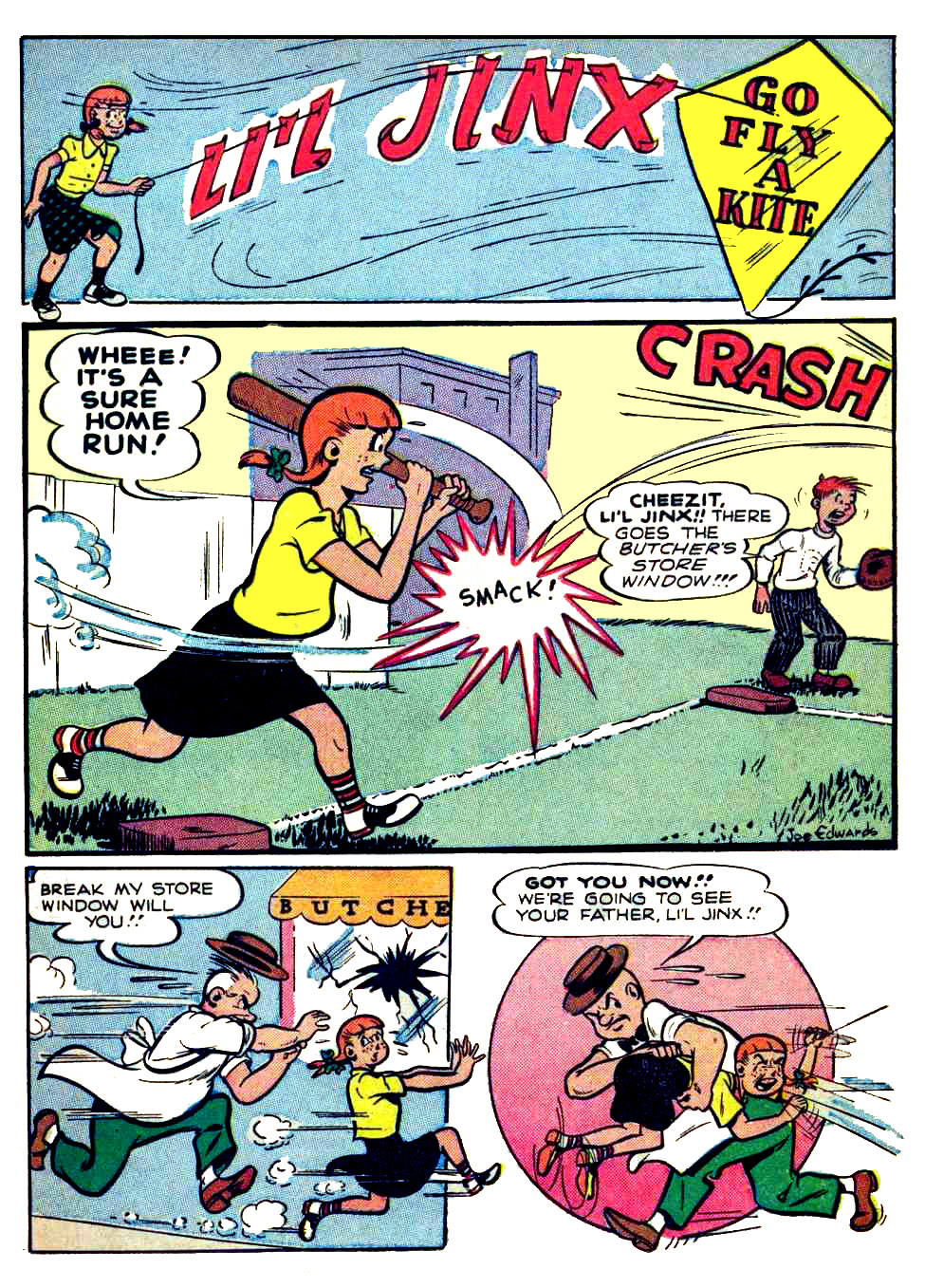
Early depiction of Jinx by Joe Edwards, circa 1949.

Li'l Jinx, created by Joe Edwards, is a fictional character in the American comic book series Li'l Jinx published by Archie Comics since the late 1940s. A high-spirited young girl who has humorous misadventures with her neighborhood friends, she first appeared in Pep Comics #62 (July 1947).

== Publication history ==
Created by Joe Edwards, Li'l Jinx Bubblegum debuted in Archie Comics' Pep Comics #62 (July 1947) and appeared in backup featurettes before landing her own title from 1956 to 1957. During her peak period, Jinx's stories ranged from three-panel blackout gags to seven-page stories. Jinx was normally depicted as a lovable but mischievous young girl, engaged in a comical battle of wills with her long-suffering father. Like most of Archie Comics' strips of the period, Jinx offered insights into family relationships and children's perceptions of the adult world.

After already appearing in numerous Archie titles, including the double-sized Little Archie, and Archie Giant Series Magazine Li'l Jinx starred in her first solo series titled Li'l Jinx which began with #1 in November 1956, and continued with #12–16 from January to September 1957. She later starred in another series, Li'l Jinx Giant Laugh-Out, which lasted from 1971 to 1973.

Li'l Jinx strips have been reprinted in the various Archie-published digest magazines (both single-page strips and 5- to 6-page strips) since the 1980s. One That Wilkin Boy story reprint featured Li'l Jinx crossing over briefly (though the artwork was actually edited so that Li'l Jinx replaced an unnamed child that appeared in the original printing of that story). She also made a cameo appearance in the 2007 story, Civil Chores Part 3, in Tales of Riverdale # 24.

== Character and story ==
Jinx was the daughter of Hap and Merry Holliday, earning her unusual nickname by virtue of being born on Halloween. Creator Edwards based Jinx's adventures on his own experiences as a parent. While "Li'l" is not part of her given name, everyone always calls her "Li'l Jinx" in the comics' dialogue, similar to the title character of Little Archie.

Jinx's friends included:

- Charley Hawse (later called Fat Charley and then just Charley) who was amply contoured, fond of confectionery, and sometimes played the role of a bully,
- Greg, who sometimes was a childhood sweetheart of Jinx.
- Gigi, who was rich and a bit selfish, a la Veronica Lodge, but still a good friend, and
- Mort the Worry Wart, who was known to have an inferiority complex.

Following the civil rights movement, Li'l Jinx's friends also included African-American kids Russ and Roz.

== Jinx as a teen ==
In Life with Archie: The Married Life #7, a short story showing Jinx (renamed Jinx Holliday) starting her first day at high school along with all her friends was included in the issue as bonus material.

In 2012, Archie Comics decided to publish stories with a teenage version of the character. The first graphic novel, named simply Jinx, was released in April 2012 featuring new material alongside stories released in Life with Archie: The Married Life. It was written by J. Torres and Terry Austin while Rick Burchett provided the artwork.

A follow-up, Jinx: Little Miss Steps, was released in June 2013, continuing to chronicle the adventures of Jinx and her friends in high school.

In Jughead the Hunger vs Vampironica, an alternate version of Jinx reveals her real father to be Satan. She read from the book of Lucifer and caused the various worlds of the Archie Multiverse to cross over, most specifically the title worlds.

=== Collected editions ===
The series has so far released two collected volumes:

Title	ISBN	Release date
Jinx	978-1879794917	April 17, 2012
Jinx: Little Miss Steps	978-1936975419	June 11, 2013
