= Black Hood =

Superhero

The Black Hood
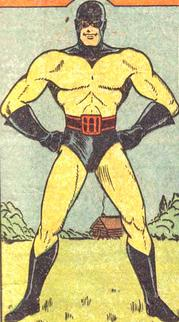
- The Black Hood, from Top-Notch Comics #9 (October 1940). Art by Al Camy.

Publication information
- Publisher: Archie Comics
- First appearance: Matthew Burland; Top-Notch Comics #9 (October 1940); Thomas "Kip" Burland; Archie's Super Hero Comic Digest Magazine #2 (1979); Mateo Burland; The Web #5 (March 2010); Gregory Hettinger; The Black Hood (vol. 4) #1 (February 2015)
- Created by: Harry Shorten; Al Camy

In-story information
- Alter ego: (Archie Comics); Matthew Burland; Thomas "Kip" Burland; Gregory Hettinger (DC Comics); Mateo Burland
- Team affiliations: The Mighty Crusaders
- Abilities: (Archie/Red Circle); Great fighter and detective (Impact); Magically increased physical abilities and awareness
Black Hood Comics
- Cover to Black Hood Comics #12 (Fall 1944)
Publication information
- Publisher: (vol. 3); Impact Comics (remaining); MLJ Magazines/Archie Comics
- Schedule: (vol.1); Quarterly (remaining); Monthly
- Format: Ongoing series
- Publication date: Vol. 1: Winter 1943 – July 1946; Vol. 2: March 1983 – September 1983; Vol. 3: October 1991 – October 1992; Vol. 4: February 2015 – June 2017
- No. of issues: 11 (Vol. 1); 3 (Vol. 2); 13 (Vol. 3); 16 (Vol. 4)
Creative team
- Written by: Vol. 3: Mark Wheatley; Vol. 4: Duane Swierczynski
- Artists: Vol. 1: Raymond Kinstler; Bill Vigoda; Harry Sahle; Clem Weisbecker; Vol. 3: Rick Burchett; Tim Sale; Peter Snejbjerg; Vol. 4: Michael Gaydos (#1–5, 7); Howard Chaykin (#6); Robert Hack (#8); Greg Scott (#9-10, 12-16); Rick Burchett (#11)

The Black Hood is the name of several fictional characters (Matthew/Mateo Burland, Thomas "Kip" Burland, and Gregory Hettinger) created by MLJ Comics (later known as Archie Comics) during the period known as the "Golden Age of Comic Books". The Black Hood first appeared in Top-Notch Comics #9, October 1940 and became one of MLJ's most popular characters. He has been in four self-titled series as well as in his own radio show, Black Hood (1943–1944). In recent decades, the Black Hood (along with other Archie Comics superheroes) has been sporadically licensed and published by DC Comics. However, the character reappeared under Archie Comics' Dark Circle Comics line in 2015.

== Publication history ==
The Black Hood first appeared in MLJ's Top-Notch Comics #9 (cover-dated Oct. 1940). He was created by Harry Shorten. The editors had enough confidence in the new character to put his name as the title on issue #9's cover, with "Top-Notch Comics" in a smaller circle below.

The Black Hood became a popular character and was given his own title, Black Hood Comics, a pulp magazine in 1943. It lasted for 11 issues before being retitled Laugh Comics and becoming an all-humor title.

The character remained in Top-Notch Comics until issue #44 (April 1944). At that point, he moved to Pep Comics for three years, from issue #48 (May 1944) to #60 (March 1947). He also appeared in nine issues of Jackpot Comics (1941-1943).

A second series debuted as part of the original Red Circle Comics imprint. It lasted for three issues from June to October 1983. This Black Hood was known as Thomas "Kip" Burland, the nephew of the original Black Hood.

In 1991, a third series was released under the Impact Comics imprint when DC Comics received the rights to the Red Circle superheroes. It lasted for 13 issues which included 12 regular issues and one annual.

A fourth series was released under the Archie Comics' imprint Dark Circle Comics in February 2015. In this version the man under the hood is Officer Gregory Hettinger who takes up the mantle of the Black Hood after accidentally killing the Thomas "Kip" Burland version. The series is a much darker and serious take on the character and has a modern, violent spin as it examines cops and criminals in the city of Philadelphia. The series is written by Duane Swierczynski with issues 1 through 5 and 7 drawn by Michael Gaydos. Howard Chaykin guest-illustrated issue 6 and Robert Hack guest-illustrated issue 8. Greg Scott started as the series new artist in February 2016 beginning with issue 9.

== Matthew Burland ==
In his first incarnation, the Black Hood is a costumed man of mystery who has been trained by a hermit to battle evil. The comic book is at first intentionally vague as to whether he possesses superpowers, or simply has the unusual strength, agility, and healing abilities that costumed crime fighters seem to possess.

His real name is Matthew Kipling "Kip" Burland, an ex-cop who has been framed for grand larceny and left for dead by a villain known as the Skull. Burland eventually clears his name, but continues to wear the costume. Matthew Burland's love interest is a newspaper reporter named Barbara "Babs" Sutton. He drives a motorcycle called the Hoodcycle that can transform into other vehicles. The Kip Burland Black Hood is unmasked in court by a character named "Needlenoodle". Thereafter, Burland becomes a private detective.

According to Jess Nevins' Encyclopedia of Golden Age Superheroes, the Black Hood's other enemies include "Panther Men, the Animal Man, the Mist (who can change into a cloud of mist at will), the Mold (who transforms humans into mold), and Octavius, the violinist and author of "the Dance of Death". He also fights the Crow.

The Black Hood enjoyed popularity for a while until he dropped from the covers and was gradually replaced by talking animal characters, as the popularity of the superhero genre faded in the late 1940s. His last few stories were as a private detective without wearing a costume.

During the 1960s the Black Hood returned in Mighty Comics for two issues of Adventures of The Fly (#7, July 1960 and #11, March, 1961). He was also seen teaching Karate in issues of Adventures of the Jaguar and Adventures of The Fly. After returning as a founding member of The Mighty Crusaders in Fly-Man #31–33, he appeared regularly as part of the team in Mighty Crusaders #1–6 (November 1965 – August 1966) during the period of Archie Comics' Mighty Comics period. He also appeared through 1967 in solo stories in Fly-Man #34 & 35 and Mighty Comics #41–44, 46, 47 & 50. This version of The Black Hood rides initially on a robot horse called Nightmare (destroyed in Mighty Crusaders #1) before switching to a motorcycle.

In Brazil, this version of the Black Hood was known as Titan O Homem Mistério (Titan the Mystery Man).

== Thomas "Kip" Burland ==
The Black Hood was revived by artist Gray Morrow during his time as an editor at Archie's Red Circle Comics line in the early 1970s, and was first published years later in Archie's Super Hero Comic Digest Magazine #2 (1979). In these stories, which includes one drawn by popular penciler Neal Adams, The Black Hood's second incarnation, Thomas "Kip" Burland, was given the secret identity by his uncle, the "first" Black Hood, who revealed that the family had in fact used the pseudonym throughout history. This version is less flamboyantly costumed, preferring to wear the mask with regular biker leathers, rides a high performance motorcycle and is typically armed with a custom designed Pepper-box pistol with multiple functions. This Black Hood appeared in three issues of his own title (June–October 1983) and the thirteen issues of The Mighty Crusaders (March 1983 – September 1985), as well as two issues of Blue Ribbon (a new story in #11 [August 1984] and a reprint of the Super Hero Comic Digest material in #8 [May 1984]). In the final issues of Mighty Crusaders, the younger Black Hood reverts to the yellow and black/blue costume worn by the prior incarnation of the character.

Thomas "Kip" Burland appears in The Black Hood (vol. 4) #1 (February 2015) as the Black Hood, wearing a black mask with eye holes and a brown jacket as his costume. He is gunned down and killed by police officer Gregory Hettinger while dressed as the Black Hood. Later, Gregory Hettinger takes up the mantle of the Black Hood.

== Impact Comics Black Hood ==
In 1991, DC Comics revived the character briefly in its Impact Comics imprint. The Impact Comics series featured three major Black Hoods: a bitter vigilante who was featured in the other Impact Comics titles and killed in the first issue of The Black Hood; a high school student who reluctantly took the hood and later abandoned it; and a former mobster, the same mobster who killed the first Black Hood. Numerous other Black Hoods from various time periods were featured in stories from the comics annuals, such as a female Black Hood who lived in medieval France patterned after Joan of Arc and a western Hood whose adventures served as an inspiration for the fictional adventures of the Lone Ranger within the Impact continuity.

The Black Hood focused on the adventures of a series of vigilante characters with the same name throughout history. Each Black Hood character would somehow come in possession of a black hood. Characters wearing the hood were given heightened awareness, and increased strength, speed, and agility. The hood caused each of its wearers to become a vigilante and fight injustice. An interesting feature of the hood was what appeared to be a curse. After a certain period of time, each wearer of the black hood would die. After the death of the Black Hood, the hood would find its way into the hands of another individual with the potential to become the next Black Hood.

The titular black hood was originally an executioner's mask. As a warlock was being executed for the crime of witchcraft, he cursed not the executioner, but his hood. From that point on, whoever wore the hood would be compelled to "do only good".

== Mateo Burland ==
DC Comics again licensed the Archie Comics superheroes and began integrating them into the DC Universe in 2009. The DC Universe version of the Black Hood made his debut in January 2010s issue of The Web. He is Mateo Burland, a young Detroit criminal whose sister is murdered by the same criminals Mateo worked with, when Mateo himself tries to escape their influence. After using weapons and equipment found in the defunct headquarters of the Justice League Detroit, Mateo confronts the drug dealer responsible for his sister's death and takes his black bandana. It is unclear whether he kills the drug dealer when he says he has meted out justice. It remains to be seen how much of a hero Mateo will become as he adopts the persona of the Black Hood.

Burland was recently shown to be a member of the "second team" of the Mighty Crusaders known as the Shadow Crusaders, helping to rescue Director (former General) Latham.

== Greg Hettinger ==
The Black Hood vol. 4, #2 (March 2015), with Greg Hettinger as the Black Hood. Cover art by Francesco Francavilla

=== The Bullet's Kiss ===
Officer Greg Hettinger is a Philadelphia cop who first appeared in The Black Hood (vol. 4) #1 (February 2015). He is seen intervening in a gun fight but takes a shotgun blast to the face. He is able to fire off one final shot before he loses consciousness. When he wakes, he finds out that he shot and killed Thomas "Kip" Burland otherwise known as the Black Hood. After struggling to deal with his scarred face and slurred speech he slowly gains an addiction to pain killers. While high he puts on the Black Hood mask, given to him by a fellow Officer as a joke, and takes to the streets to stop a cry for help. He slowly begins to go out more as the Black Hood and after being framed by the local drug ring, and being demoted to desk duty, he sets out to take down the leader known only as "The Connection" while also helping with civil disturbances.

After almost getting killed by some drug dealers, Hettinger confides in his speech therapist, Jessie Dupree, and together they are able to find someone who knows the name of "The Connection" and where to find him. Hettinger confronts "The Connection" who is revealed to be Deputy Mayor John Cuthbert. After engaging in a fight with Cuthbert, Hettinger is able to put the Black Hood mask over Cuthbert's face before pushing him through a window where he falls to his death. It is later reported that Cuthbert's death is being investigated as a suicide and that he was in fact the Black Hood attempting to take out the competition. Hettinger is re-promoted to being an Officer after it is made clear that he was framed by Cuthbert and after being sent to rehab on account of his addiction is seen sewing a new Black Hood mask so that he can continue to make up for his sins.

=== Collected editions ===
The series has so far been assembled into the following collection:

==== Trade paperbacks ====
Title	ISBN	Release date	Collected material	Issues published
The Black Hood, Vol. 1: The Bullet's Kiss	978-1619889620	July 17, 2017	The Black Hood Vol. 4 #1–5	February 2015 – August 2015
The Black Hood, Vol. 2: The Lonely Crusade	978-1627388900	June 12, 2018	The Black Hood Vol. 4 #6–11, Vampironica #1	December 2015 – August 2016
The Black Hood, Vol. 3: The Nobody Murders	978-1682558836	December 18, 2018	The Black Hood Season 2 #1–5	August 2016 – 2017

== In other media ==
=== Radio ===
A 15-minute radio serial, Black Hood, was broadcast on the Mutual Broadcasting System from July 5, 1943 to January 14, 1944.

=== Television ===
The Black Hood appears in The CW television drama Riverdale, predominantly modeled after the Thomas Burland version. He debuts at the end of the first season finale before becoming one of the main antagonists of the second season. He is portrayed as a serial killer who attacks citizens of Riverdale he deems to be sinners. The masked villain was seemingly revealed to be school janitor Mr. Svenson / Joseph Conway, but the Black Hood re-emerges after Svenson's death. The Black Hood's victims include gunshot survivors Fred Andrews, Moose Mason and Midge Klump, with the latter becoming a fatality along with Geraldine Grundy / Jennifer Gibson, Robert Phillips / "The Sugarman" and Dr. Masters.

In the second-to-last episode of season 2, the Black Hood is revealed to be Betty's father, Hal Cooper, who confesses to what he has done. Betty and Alice later have Hal arrested for his actions. Betty makes a last visit to Hal to inform him that she will not go down his path of being a murderer. Despite her initial intentions to the contrary, she later continues visiting him. Eventually, Hal escapes incarceration and is killed by his ally and ex-romantic partner Penelope Blossom, the mother of Cheryl Blossom.
