= Frank Borth =

American comic book artist

- Born: Frank Mellors Borth III; April 1, 1918 Cleveland, Ohio, US
- Died: August 9, 2009 (aged 91) Newville, Pennsylvania, US
- Areas: Writer, Penciller, Inker
- Notable works: Ken Stuart; There Oughta Be a Law!
- Spouse: Barbara Ann Stroh

Frank M. Borth III (April 1, 1918 – August 9, 2009) was an American comic book artist.

== Biography ==
Borth was born and raised in Cleveland, eventually graduating in 1940 from the Cleveland School of Art, where he majored in illustration.

Moving to New York City, Frank Borth rose to prominence during the so-called "Golden Age of Comic Books", where he first (in 1941) worked on the feature "Pat Patriot, America's Joan of Arc," for Lev Gleason Publications' Daredevil Comics. After freelance jobs with Timely Comics, Harvey Comics, and Picture Scoop, Borth found a home at Quality Comics, where he was responsible for characters such as Spider Widow and (for a time) Phantom Lady.

Borth served in the military during World War II, ending up in 1946 on Montauk Point, Long Island. It was there that he was inspired to create the sea adventure comic strip Ken Stuart, which was syndicated by the Frank J. Markey Syndicate from September 8, 1947, to 1950. The Markey syndicate also attempted to syndicate Borth's strip Bouford in 1949. Columbia Comics published one issue of a Ken Stuart comic book in 1948.

Following the demise of Ken Stuart, Borth worked on features for a few Ziff-Davis Comics titles, including "Skypilot" and "Captain Fleet."

From the late 1940s onward, Borth worked extensively for the Ohio-based Catholic-oriented comic book publisher George A. Pflaum, whose most well-known title was Treasure Chest. Borth worked on such Treasure Chest features as "Chuck White," "Frumson Wooters," and many others. Beginning in 1963, and lasting until the title's cancellation in 1972, Treasure Chest also serialized a drawing course called "Draw-Along with Frank Borth."

In the mid-to-late 1960s, Borth became active in the Montauk community, eventually becoming councilman on the East Hampton town board in 1968, a position which lasted until 1972.

From 1970 to 1983, Borth wrote the syndicated gag panel There Oughta Be a Law!, taking over from co-creator Harry Shorten.

Despite retiring in 1983, Borth did occasional assignments for Cracked magazine, as well as Asimov's Science Fiction, Amazing Stories, and Monsters Attack, in the following years.

Borth died in Newville, Pennsylvania, on August 9, 2009, aged 91.
