= Harry Brunt =

Canadian cartoonist

- Professor Punk, one of Brunt's creations
- Born: Harry Joseph Brunt; November 22, 1918 Chicago, Illinois, United States
- Died: August 12, 1987 (aged 68) Hamilton, Ontario, Canada
- Area: Cartoonist

Harry Joseph Brunt (November 22, 1918 – August 12, 1987) was an American-born Canadian cartoonist who made significant humorous contributions during the era of the Canadian Whites. He is the father of Stephen Brunt, a sports columnist for The Globe and Mail.

== Biography ==
Born in Chicago in 1918, Brunt's family moved to Simcoe, Ontario, several years later. He became an artist, and started to work for Bell Features around Christmas 1943.

His contributions to the Canadian Whites were generally featurettes of 2–3 pages in length, cartoony and goofy in nature, whose titles heavily drew on alliteration. Titles included Goofy Gags, Barnacle Bull, Kernel Korn, Professor Punk, Loop the Droop, Lank the Yank, and Buz and his Bus. The only title that broke the pattern was his final creation, J. C. Flatbottom, which may have had an autobiographical character. A self-caricature figured in one of the later Lank the Yank stories.

After World War II, Brunt settled in the Hamilton area. He drew editorial cartoons for The Simcoe Reformer during the war, sports cartoons for the Hamilton Spectator in the 1950s, and editorial cartoons later on for the Georgetown Independent in the 1970s. He was also a painter, and an exhibition of his work was held in Georgetown, Ontario in 1973.

Brunt died in 1987 at the McMaster University Medical Centre in Hamilton, after a lengthy illness.
