= Super Duck =

Comic book character

Publication information
- Publisher: MLJ Comics/Archie Comics
- First appearance: Jolly Jingles #10 (summer 1943)
- Created by: Al Fagaly

In-story information
- Alter ego: The Cockeyed Wonder
- Species: Duck
- Place of origin: Earth
- Partnerships: Uwanna Duck; Fauntleroy Duck; Mushnoggin
- Abilities: Comics
Super Duck
Publication information
- Schedule: bimonthly
- Format: standard
- Genre: humor, anthropomorphic
- Publication date: Fall 1944 – Dec. 1960
- No. of issues: 94
- Main character: Super Duck
Creative team
- Written by: Burton Geller, Dave Berg, Joe Harold
- Artist(s): Al Fagaly, Red Holmdale, Burton Geller, Joe Edwards, Dave Berg, Joe Harold

Super Duck was a comic book character created in 1943 for what was then MLJ Comics (now Archie Comics) by staff artist Al Fagaly. As his name implies, Super Duck (nicknamed "Supe") was originally a parody of Superman, even down to a red and blue costume. But his time as a superhero was short, and by late 1944 his stories became more conventional, in the Disney/Carl Barks mode.

Super Duck Comics ran from 1944 to 1960, featuring "Super Duck, the Cockeyed Wonder" in his most familiar attire: a black shirt, red lederhosen and often an Alpine hat. Regular contributors to Super Duck Comics included creator Al Fagaly, as well as Red Holmdale. Fagaly illustrated most covers up through the early 1950s.

== Publication history ==
Super Duck's first appearance came in Jolly Jingles #10 (summer 1943), but his time as a superhero was short, and by Jolly Jingles #16 (the last issue) his stories became more conventional.

Super Duck Comics' first issue was cover-dated Fall 1944; it ended its run at 94 issues in 1960.

The character's escapades would be reprinted in Archie Comics' digest series Jughead Jones (at least as late as 1979), Laugh Comics Digest, and Archie's Mad House. More recently (2013 onward), his stories have often been reprinted in the digests again.

The Super Duck character himself has also returned in modern times, most typically presented as a comic book superhero within Archie's world. Various magic-themed stories have made this Super Duck temporarily "real" to have adventures with Archie and others. His role combines his early superhero stature with his later facial design, grumpy temper, and bad luck.

In March 2020, one issue of Super Duck was published. The comic was written by Ian Flynn and Frank Tieri and illustrated by Ryan Jampole. Unlike previous comics, this comic was not for children. It was planned to be a four-issue miniseries but it appears to have long since been canceled.

== Characters and storylines ==
- Super Duck ("Supe") — the "Cockeyed Wonder," hero of his adventures. Originally got his powers from a prescription for vitamins, much in the manner of Hourman, the Blue Beetle and other serious superheroes
- Uwanna, Supe's temperamental girlfriend
- Dapper, Supe's rival
- Fauntleroy ("Fluke" or "Faunt"), Supe's bratty nephew (sometimes identified as his younger brother)." From 1950–1952, Archie published three annual issues of Fauntleroy Comics, a spin-off from Super Duck that featured the artwork of Al Fagaly
- Mushnoggin, Supe's burly derelict friend

Stories from the superhero period of Super Duck's run involved Supe getting into hapless situations, such as:

- "Mopy Duck" — Supe yells at Faunt for thinking that someone could actually live inside a whale after reading the story of Jonah. Supe then accidentally falls off a cruise ship and, in short order, gets swallowed by a whale, meets someone living inside it, gets tossed around inside the whale, and manages to get out and land back on the ship after the whale throws him up in the air with his water spout. When Faunt sees that he's all wet and tells him so, Supe takes Faunt's book on Jonah and says, "Faunt, I'm all wet about a lot of things."
- "The Nifty Thrifty Trip" — Supe and Faunt go camping in the country to save money, but Supe — against Faunt's advice — tries to steal apples and milk from farmers, and camps on private property. He is forced to spend money to pay for damages, pays exorbitantly when he and Faunt hitch a ride home in what turns out to be a taxi, and ends up with the worst case of poison ivy his doctor has ever seen. Even though he never wanted to hear about milk or the country ever again, Supe is forced to live on milk for a month per doctor's orders and then has to go to the country for a long rest.
- "Cool Water" — Supe ricochets himself across a farm in attempt to pull a bucket of water from a well to drink. He gets the water and starts drinking it only to find frogs and insects in the water.
- Supe and Faunt advertise that they'll travel anywhere for money. A huckster with a Southern accent takes them to "The great state of Textucky." There, he tricks them into boarding a three-stage rocket. In outer space, when the rocket breaks up, they drift around until they meet an extraterrestrial used-spacecraft salesman, who sells them a flying saucer (for Supe's glass marbles; glass is unknown on his home planet). They fly the saucer back to "Textucky," where the conman pays them the 50 grand —in Confederate money! It's worthless! Faunt says, "Aw heck! We won't be able to spend it anywhere except here in ol' Textucky!" Supe thinks about this. So that's what they do!

== Parodies ==
Underground cartoonist Robert Crumb wrote and drew a sexual version of Super Duck and Uwanna in a seven-page story in Mystic Funnies #3, published in 2002 by Fantagraphics Books.
