= There Oughta Be a Law! =

American comic strip (1944–1985)

- Author(s): Harry Shorten (1944–1970); Frank Borth (1970–1983); Mort Gerberg (1983–1985)
- Illustrator(s): Al Fagaly (1944–1963); Warren Whipple (1963–1981); Mort Gerberg (1981–1985)
- Current status/schedule: Concluded daily gag panel
- Launch date: 1944
- End date: April 13, 1985
- Alternate name(s): Bitter Laff (1944–1945); TOBAL!
- Syndicate(s): McClure Newspaper Syndicate / Bell-McClure Syndicate (1944–c. 1972); United Feature Syndicate (c. 1972–1985)
- Publisher(s): Midwood Books; Belmont Books
- Genre(s): gag-a-day, humor, adults

There Oughta Be a Law!, or TOBAL!, was a single-panel newspaper comic strip, created by Harry Shorten and Al Fagaly, which was syndicated for four decades from 1944 to 1985. The gags illustrated minor absurdities, frustrations, hypocrisies, ironies and misfortunes of everyday life, displayed in a single-panel or two-panel format. There Oughta Be a Law! was similar to Jimmy Hatlo's They'll Do It Every Time. TOBAL! was initially syndicated by the McClure Newspaper Syndicate; eventually it moved over to United Feature Syndicate.

== Publication history ==
In 1944, while an editor at MLJ Comics, Shorten created the strip, bringing along MLJ artist Al Fagaly. The strip's original title was Bitter Laff, changing to There Oughta Be a Law on October 22, 1945. A Sunday strip began in 1948, and ended in 1980. Eventually, the strip incorporated reader ideas.

Fagaly died in 1963, with Warren Whipple taking over the art duties until 1981. Shorten provided scripts until 1970, when Frank Borth took over the writing, lasting until 1983. Mort Gerberg took over art duties in 1981, and both writing & art in 1983. The strip ended on April 13, 1985.

== Characters and story ==
Many strips ended with a character yelling out the phrase "There Oughta Be a Law!", or just "TOBAL!" Because of its format, recurring characters were infrequently used, but TOBAL! did feature occasional characters such as Cringely, Carbuncle, Locknutt, and so on, as well as the daughter character Bratinella.

== Collected editions ==
Many collected editions were published by companies affiliated with Harry Shorten, including Midwood Books, Belmont Books, Belmont Tower, and Roband Productions:

- There Oughta Be a Law! (Hasbrouck Heights, N.J.: Graphic Publications, 1952) — introduction by Danny Kaye; reprinted in 1966 by Tower Publications
- There Oughta Be a Law no. 4 (Midwood, 1958)
- There Oughta Be a Law (New York: Roband Productions, 19??)
- There Oughta Be a Law (New York: Belmont Books, 1969, 1971)
- There Oughta Be a Law (New York: Modern Promotions [A Unisystems Company], 1970, 1971) — a "unibook"
- Harry Shorten's There Oughta be a Law (Belmont Tower, 1974)
- There Oughta be a Law (New York: Belmont Tower, 1976)
