= Archie Giant Series =

- Cover of Archie Giant Series Magazine 1 (1954) .

Publication information
- Publisher: Archie Comics
- Schedule: bimonthly
- Publication date: 1954–July 1992
- No. of issues: 332 (see below)

Archie Giant Series is a comic book title published by Archie Comics from 1954 to 1992, which featured an ever revolving subtitle. It began in 1954 as Archie's Christmas Stocking, and continued with this title for six yearly issues. Beginning with the seventh issue, Katy Keen Holiday Fun (September 1960), the book began to be published more frequently and feature a number of different titles, each with the cover heading Archie Giant Series. Titles included World of Archie, World of Jughead, Katy Keene, Betty and Veronica Summer Spectacular, Sabrina's Christmas Magic and many others, including additional appearances of Archie's Christmas Stocking. The book became a regular 32-page book with issue #234 (June 1975). while still retaining the "Giant" in the title. One additional interesting item about this title is that it twice skipped in its numbering: it continued up to #35, then skipped to #136; it then continued up to #251, then skipped to #452 and continued to #632 (July 1992). It was replaced with the quarterly books Archie and Friends (1992–2012), Betty and Veronica Spectacular (1992–2009), and World of Archie (1992–1996).

== See also ==
- List of Archie Comics Publications
