= Mort Gerberg =

American cartoonist (born 1931)

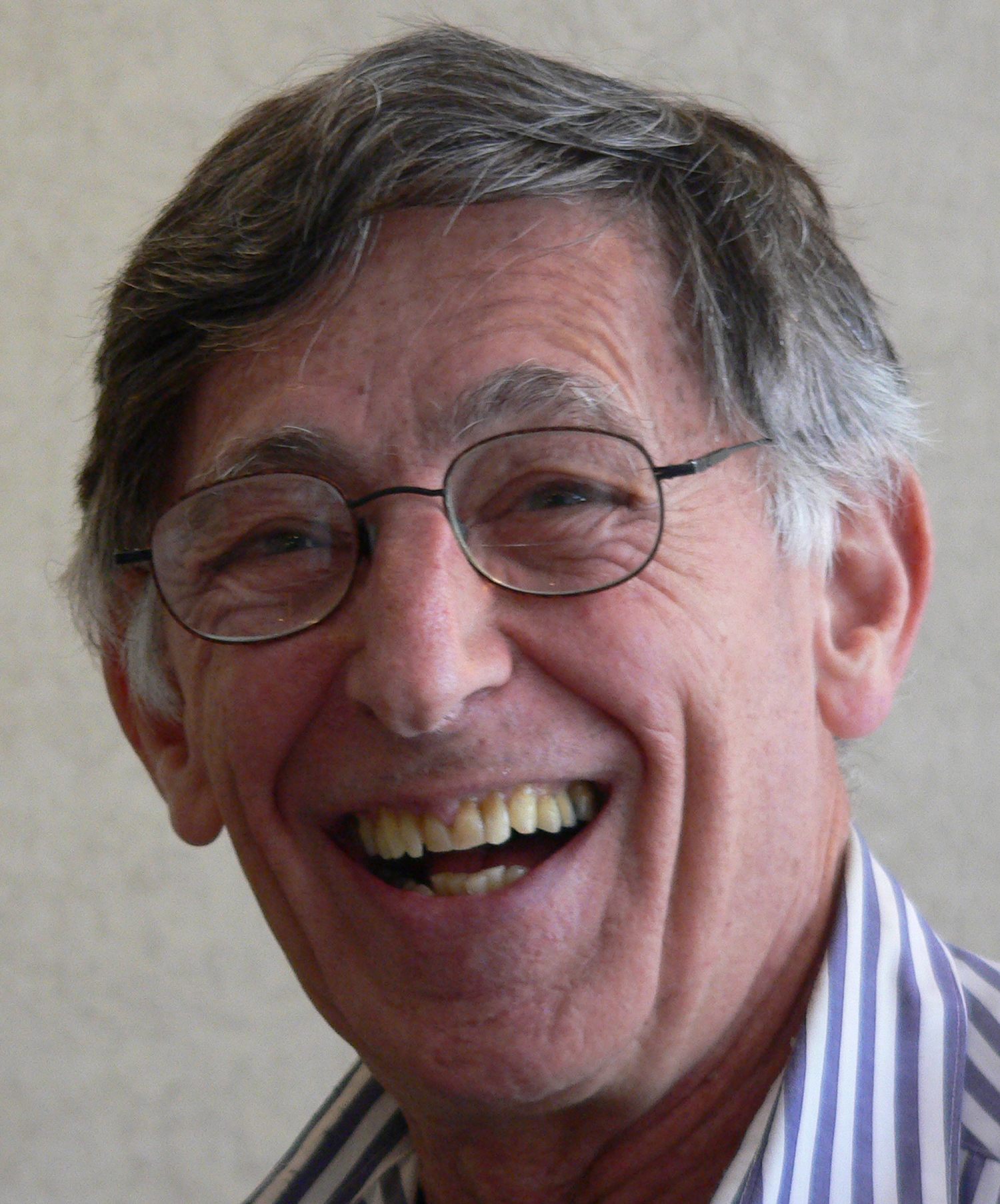
- Born: March 11, 1931 (age 95) New York City, US
- Areas: Cartoonist, illustrator, author
- Spouse: Judith Gerberg
- Children: 1

Mort Gerberg (born March 11, 1931) is a multi-genre American cartoonist and author whose work has appeared in magazines, newspapers, books, online, home video, film and television. He is best known for his magazine cartoons, which have appeared in numerous and diverse titles such as The New Yorker, Playboy, Harvard Business Review, The Huffington Post and Paul Krassner's The Realist, and for his 1983 book, "Cartooning: The Art and The Business". He created a weekly news cartoon, Out of Line, for Publishers Weekly from 1988 to 1994 and has drawn an editorial-page cartoon for The Columbia Paper, the weekly newspaper in Columbia County, New York, since 2003.

Besides magazine cartoons, Gerberg has drawn nationally syndicated newspaper comic strips. His strip Koky, co-created and written by Richard O'Brien, was syndicated from 1979 to 1981 by the Chicago Tribune-New York News Syndicate. (In 2007, Ramble House collected the strip's entire run into two books, one for the dailies and one for the Sundays.) It also syndicated his daily panel Hang in There during the same period. For United Feature Syndicate, Gerberg updated the early classic strip, There Oughta Be a Law! writing and drawing it for several years in the early 1980s. Gerberg also collaborated on the creation of the strip, Inside Woody Allen for King Features Syndicate, a strip for Universal Press Syndicate for astrologer Jeane Dixon and a strip for United Feature Syndicate for the Pulitzer Prize-winning reporter Jack Anderson.

Gerberg has written, edited and/or illustrated over 45 books for adults and children. They include: Cartooning: The Art and the Business, the most authoritative guidebook in the field since 1983; Last Laughs: Cartoons About Aging, Retirement ... and the Great Beyond; Joy in Mudville: The Big Book of Baseball Humor, with Dick Schaap; The All-Jewish Cartoon Collection; Right on Sister; The High Society, Mort Gerberg on the Scene: A 50-Year Cartoon Chronicle (published by Fantagraphics) and the children's books Why Did Halley’s Comet Cross The Universe?, Geographunny, and the best-selling More Spaghetti, I Say.

For television, Gerberg wrote and drew an animated fable, "Opportunity Buzzes". for PBS’s 51st State on Channel 13, New York, and wrote and drew three animated skits for the feminist show, Woman, on CBS, in 1972. He drew twice-daily topical cartoons and a weekly on-camera-drawing feature, "Cartoon Views of the News", for NBC’s Channel Four, New York in 1975-1978. In the early 1990s Gerberg was also a content provider for ABC-TV Multimedia, Prodigy, America Online and, online, BookWire.com.

Gerberg has done a number of on-the-scene sketch reportage assignments for print and television, drawing and writing about national and international events. They included "swinging London" in 1967, The Democratic National Convention in Chicago in 1968, The New York Mets’ pennant win in 1969, an African safari in 1972, New York Knick fans in 1973, and the U.S. Open at Forest Hills in 1976.

Gerberg is a popular public speaker on the subjects of cartooning, Jewish humor and aging. He has appeared nationally and internationally at different venues, including universities, corporate conferences, synagogues and film festivals. He was a founder and former president of The Cartoonists Guild and is a member of the National Cartoonists Society and The Authors Guild.

Gerberg taught cartooning for over 15 years at New York City's Parsons School of Design and for the New School's distance learning program. One of his former students was The Wall Street Journal caricaturist Ken Fallin.[1] Gerberg also co-edited, with New Yorker cartoonist Ed Fisher, ″The Art in Cartooning,″ and collaborated, with Bob Mankoff, cartoon editor of The New Yorker, on an instruction kit for Barnes & Noble, "Creating Cartoons From Think To Ink'."

For clients in the business world (including Fidelity Investments, MasterCard, Epson, AT&T, Motorola, John Hancock, Brooks Brothers, among others) he has created customized art, cartoons and writing for their advertising and public relations, many for ads in "The New Yorker", and has been a consultant for ideation focus groups.

== Biography ==
Brooklyn-born Gerberg graduated from the Baruch College of The City College of New York with a BBA in 1952, then served in the U.S. Army for two years, mostly at Fort Richardson, Anchorage, Alaska, in the Public Information Office, where he was editor of the post newspaper, The Alaskan Post. Returning to civilian life, he worked as a newspaper reporter for the Park Row Service in New York City, as the advertising sales promotion manager for Cosmopolitan magazine and as advertising sales promotion copy chief for the Ziff-Davis Publishing Company. He left Ziff-Davis and New York in 1960 to live in San Miguel de Allende, Mexico for a year, to write and draw. He then returned to New York to begin a freelance career.

He sold his first cartoons beginning in 1961 to many small magazines, like 1000 Jokes, Swank, Dude, Gent, Cavalier and Diners Club Magazine, then publishing in all major markets, such as the Saturday Evening Post, Look, Saturday Review, Esquire, Life, Cosmopolitan, before joining "Playboy" and "The New Yorker".

On Election Day, November 7, 1972, Gerberg appeared with Barbara Walters on the Today Show, drawing a political cartoon while she interviewed him.

On January 20, 1973, Gerberg appeared with Edwin Newman and Robin Cook on NBC-TV's live network coverage of Richard Nixon's second inauguration, drawing and commenting on the ceremony.

In 1989, Gerberg appeared as a featured guest artist in the Shari Lewis home video, Lamb Chop in the Land of No Manners.

In 1998, Gerberg was honored by the American School of Bilbao, Spain, to help celebrate its auspicious "Young Author’s Festival," by inviting him to visit and draw for grade and high school pupils at the American Schools in Valencia, Madrid, Barcelona, Bilbao and Lisbon.

Gerberg appeared in the 2001 PBS documentary, "Funny Business: An Inside Look at the Art of Cartooning," focusing on the creative and personal sides of several New Yorker cartoonists.

In 2014, The Library of Congress acquired 79 of Gerberg's original pen and ink drawings for cartoons and reportage that had been published in several different venues.

Gerberg has been interviewed multiple times for Tony Guida’s New York on CUNY.TV.

Gerberg was featured in the HBO documentary, "Very Semi-Serious: A Partially-Thorough Portrait of New Yorker Cartoonists," which aired on December 14, 2015.

The New-York Historical Society presented his 50-year retrospective, “Mort Gerberg Cartoons: A New Yorker’s Perspective,” from February to May, 2019, more than 125 cartoons, drawings, sketch reportage and film clips.

On August 14, 2019, Gerberg played the 1907 Steinway piano that had belonged to Cole Porter at The New-York Historical Society, where it was on display, for a sing-along audience of one hundred people.

In the December 30, 2019 issue of The New Yorker, in an illustrated feature entitled, "Celebrities Pick Their Favorite New Yorker Cartoons," the first entry was by Steve Martin, who selected a Mort Gerberg cartoon from the April 12, 1969 issue of the magazine which featured a trained seal who said, "Of course, what I'd really like to do is direct."

Two of Gerberg’s original drawings were included in "Superheroes in Gotham," an exhibition at the New York Historical Society that ran from October 2015 to February 2016; one of his New Yorker cartoons that was published in July, 1997, and a pencil sketch he drew in his Hebrew schoolbook when he was eight years old.

== Awards ==
In 2004, Gerberg was awarded the City College of New York's prestigious Townsend Harris Medal for Notable Achievement.

He was a City College of New York Communications Hall of Fame Honoree for 2010.

Gerberg was voted as Best Magazine Cartoonist of 2007 and 2008 by the National Cartoonists Society, and received five NCS nominations in other years, four as Best Magazine Cartoonist and one for Best Advertising Illustration.

In June, 2021, Gerberg was the recipient of The National Cartoonists Society’s Gold Key Award, honoring him as the 16th member of The National Cartoonists Society Hall of Fame.

In January 2016, Gerberg was given the Tom Gill Educational Award, by the National Cartoonists Society "for a lifetime of outstanding contributions to the art of cartooning."

== Personal life ==
Gerberg lived in New York City with his wife, Judith, an internationally known career counselor for many decades. In June, 2020, with the outbreak of the COVID-19 pandemic, he and his wife, moved to Lakewood Colorado where his daughter, Lilia Gerberg, an expert on combating malaria, lives with her family.
