= Joe Edwards (comics) =

American comic book artist

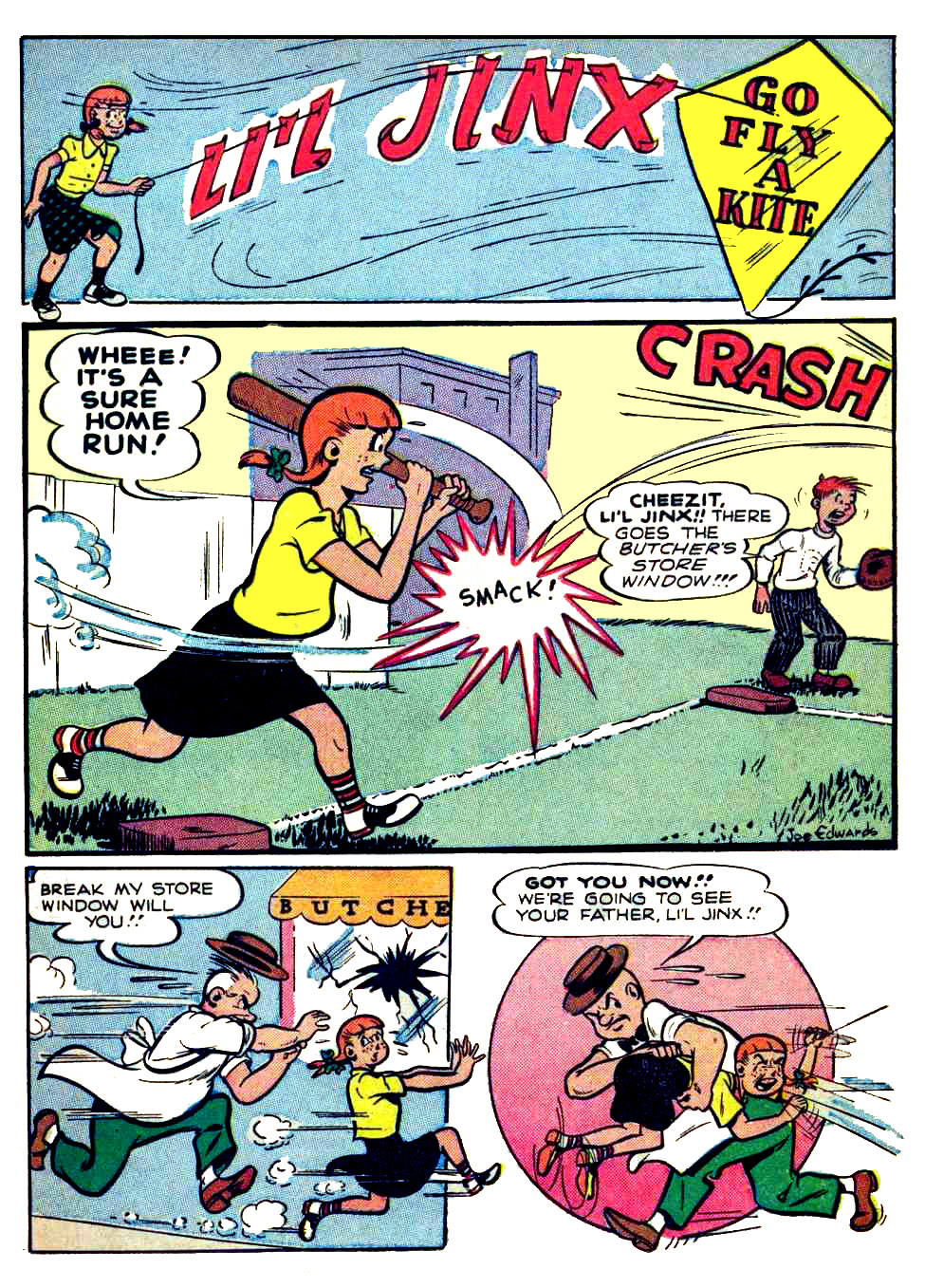
- Li'l Jinx, from Pep Comics number 71, January 1949.
- Born: December 6, 1921 Manhattan, New York City, New York
- Died: February 8, 2007 (aged 85) Central Islip, New York
- Area: Artist

Joe Edwards (December 6, 1921 – February 8, 2007) was an American comic book artist best known for creating Archie Comics' mischievous little-girl character Li'l Jinx while working in the industry for over 65 years.

== Biography ==
Born in the New York City borough of Manhattan, Edwards studied at art Rome Academy and the Hastings Animation School. He served in the U.S. Army during World War II, where his duties including illustrating training manuals and, while based in Italy, cartoon warning signs of minefields around Naples.

Edwards began his comics career with Demby Studios, one of the early "packages" who would provide outsourced comics on demand for publishers testing out the new medium of comic books in the late 1930s and 1940s. He later worked for Dell Comics and Timely Comics, the 1940s forerunner of Marvel Comics. In 1942, he joined MLJ Comics, the forerunner of Archie Comics, working first on talking animal stories featuring Squoimy the Woim, Cubby the Bear and Bumble the Bee-tective.

With the publication of the teen-humor title Archie Comics #1 that same year, Edwards would go on to illustrate many adventures of the popular Riverdale high-schoolers Archie, Jughead, Betty and Veronica, as well, working on them as recently as the 1980s.

Edwards also worked on Super Duck, Captain Sprocket and his own creation Li'l Jinx, whose name was based on her birthdate being Halloween, the same as one of Edwards' sons, Ken. Li'l Jinx appeared in Pep Comics from 1947 to 1982, as well as the Little Archie and Archie Giant Series titles over many years.

Edwards died in Central Islip, New York followings years of treatment for heart problems. He was survived by his wife, Eda Lisa Selnick Edwards; sons Todd and Ken; daughter Naomi; 2 grandchildren and 4 great-grandchildren.
