= Top-Notch Comics =

American comic book series

- Cover of Top Notch Comics 1 (Dec 1939)

Publication information
- Publisher: MLJ Magazines Inc
- Schedule: Monthly
- Publication date: December 1939 – May 1942
- No. of issues: 27
- Main character(s): The Wizard; Black Hood; The Firefly; Kardak the Mystic Magician; Wings Johnson of Air Patrol; Keith Cornell, West Pointer; Bob Phantom, Scourge of the Underworld; Fran Fraser, Girl Photographer

Top-Notch Comics is an American comic book anthology series that was published by MLJ Magazines Inc., more commonly known as MLJ Comics, during the 1930s and 1940s period known as the Golden Age of Comic Books. From issue #28 it was re-titled Top-Notch Laugh Comics.

== Publication history ==
It was launched a month after Blue Ribbon Comics #1 (Nov. 1942) with an editorial page exclaiming 'Let's all whoop it up together for TOP-NOTCH....THE WORLD'S GREATEST COMIC BOOK!' . The series was edited by Harry Shorten.

The format of Top-Notch Comics was very similar to Blue Ribbon Comics; 64 pages of short strips, initially featuring a mixture of science-fiction stories such as "Scott Rand in the Worlds of Time" (#1–2) written by Otto Binder as 'Eando Binder' and drawn by his brother Jack Binder; and "Streak Chandler on Mars" (#4–8), the crime story "Lucky Coyne, Undercover Man" (#1) and true crime detection stories in "Manhunters" by future Plastic Man creator Jack Cole (artist) (#1–3); and a number of adventure tales, "Swift of the Secret Service" (#1–3), "The Mystic" (#1–3), "Dick Storm" (#2–8) and "Stacey Knight, M.D." (#2–4).

Furthering the similarities with Blue Ribbon Comics, the medieval Knights of the Round Table tale "Galahad" by Lim Streeter (#5–11), mirrored the Green Falcon series in that title. Early issues of Top-Notch Comics also contained text stories, as all comic books did through the early 1960s to satisfy U.S. Postal Service requirements for magazine rates. A few short humor strips also featured in the first four issues, "Lonesome Luke", "Impy" by Winsor McCay and a rhyming funny animal strip "Pokey Forgets to Remember" (all in issue #1), while "Noodle" by Quincy featured in six issues (#2–7). The "Impy" 1-page strip was the only reprint during the Top-Notch Comics run.

No single character lasted for the whole run of Top-Notch Comics/Top-Notch Laugh Comics, although the costumed hero the Wizard – subtitled "The Man With the Super-Brain", which began in issue #1, ran until #27 (May 1942). A number of other costumed heroes accompanied The Wizard with long runs in Top-Notch Comics, "Bob Phantom – The Scourge of the Underworld" (#3-25), initially by Irv Novick but later written by editor Harry Shorten and drawn by Bernie Klein, had made two appearances in Blue Ribbon Comics prior to transferring to Top-Notch Comics. The superhero the "Firefly" made 19 appearances (#8–26) while "Kardak the Mystic Magician", by the Shorten/Klein team lasted 25 issues. Black Hood, who appeared from issue #9 (Oct. 1940) until the last issue of the renamed Top-Notch Laugh Comics (#45, June 1944), was the longest running character in the title, displacing The Wizard to feature on every cover from #9.

MLJ also introduced a wide range of long-lasting adventure characters early on in the series; "Air Patrol" (#1–27), re-titled "Wings Johnson of Air Patrol" from #3 (Feb. 1940), about an American flyer who enlists in the British R.A.F. before America enters World War II, was written and drawn by Irv Novick, and later by Jo Blaire and Ed Smalle, "The West Pointer", later renamed "Keith Cornell, West Pointer" (#7–27) which followed Keith Cornell through United States Military Academy and into various theaters of war, "Fran Fraser"', about a girl photographer who travelled the world on adventure assignments, by Irv Novick and Joe Blair (#9–24) and a boxing story, "The St Louis Kid" (#14–26) with artwork mainly by Bob Montana best known for his work on Archie Andrews. This line-up gave Top-Notch Comics a roster of characters that changed very little over the life of the title, outlasting its companion Blue Ribbon Comics by a year – over two if the revamp to Top-Notch Laugh Comics is included.

MLJ ran a reader-participation competition in Top-Notch Comics #6 (June 1940), offering 100 prizes to readers who completed a coupon listing their favorite characters.

Another feature unusual in early superhero strips was used several times by MLJ. In Top-Notch Comics #5 (May 1940), MLJs Pep Comics character the Shield guests in the Wizard story, while The Wizard appeared in the "Keith Cornell, West Pointer" story. This cross-over gimmick was repeated in #7 by The Shield and The Wizard again (although only in a 3-panel cameo). This time the appearance was designed to set up the announcement of a new MLJ title, Shield-Wizard Comics #1, advertised in the issue.

Top-Notch Laugh Comics
- Cover of Top Notch Laugh Comics 28 (Jul 1942) Art by Bob Montana.

Publication information
- Publisher: MLJ Magazines Inc
- Schedule: Monthly / Bi-monthly
- Publication date: June 1942 – June 1943
- No. of issues: 8
- Main character(s): Black Hood; Kardak the Mystic Magician; Snoopy McGook the Soapy Sleuth; Pokey Oakey; Dotty and Ditto

=== Top-Notch Laugh Comics/Laugh Comix ===
In a change of editorial direction, from issue #28 (July 1942) the story emphasis changed to humor strips and the title became Top-Notch Laugh Comics to reflect this. All the long-running adventure series from Top-Notch Comics ended between issue #24 (Feb. 1942) and #27 (May 1942), leaving only Black Hood and Kardak the Mystic Magician as non-humor strips in the title; although Kardak only lasted until issue #30 (Nov. 1942). This change of emphasis to humor strips had been presaged in Top-Notch Comics #25 (March 1942) when "Snoopy McGook, the Soapy Sleuth" joined the roster. From issue #28 he was joined by "Pokey Oakey", "Senor Siesta", the boxing humor strip "Canvas Back Corkle", "Percy The Three Monkey-teers" and, from issue #29 (Sept. 1942), "Gloomy Gus – the Homeless Ghost". One of these new humor strips, "Dotty and Ditto" by Bill Woggon (best known for his "Katy Keene" comic) was unusual as it featured a continuing storyline as opposed to single-issue scripts.

A peculiar effect of MLJ retaining Black Hood, one of their most popular characters, on the cover of Top-Notch Laugh Comics was that he shared the covers in humorous situations with the other featured characters, despite maintaining the dark, violent tone of his previous stories within the issues.

Despite the switch to a humor theme, Top-Notch Comics first went to a bi-monthly schedule with #43 (Feb. 1944), and then was retitled Laugh Comix with issue #46 (Summer 1944) for three more issues before being canceled with #48. (Laugh Comix is not to be confused with the later Laugh Comics series).

== Series features ==
- "The Wizard" – superhero (#1–27) titled 'The Wizard and Roy the Super-Boy' from #7
- "Scott Rand in the Worlds of Time" – science-fiction (#1–2)
- "Swift of the Secret Service" – spy/detective (#1–3)
- "Air Patrol" – (#1–27) titled "Wings Johnson of Air Patrol" from #4
- "The Mystic" – adventure/crime (#1–3)
- "The West Pointer" – adventure/war (#1–26) titled "Keith Cornell, West Pointer" from #7
- "Manhunters" – true crime detection cases (#1–3)
- "Dick Storm" – adventure (#2–8)
- "Stacey Knight M.D." – adventure/crime (2–3)
- "Bob Phantom – The Scourge of the Underworld" – superhero (#3–25)
- "Moore of the Mounted" – crime (#4)
- "Streak Chandler on Mars" – science fiction (#4–8)
- "Kardak the Mystic Magician" – costumed hero (#4–28)
- "Galahad" – medieval knight (#5–11)
- "Shanghai Sheridan" – adventure (#5–8)
- "The Firefly" – superhero (#8–26)
- "Black Hood" – costumed hero (#9–27)
- "Fran Fraser" – adventure (#9–24)
- "The St Louis Kid" – boxing/adventure (14–26)
- "Dotty and Ditto" – humor (#27–45)
- "Suzie" – humor (#28–48)
