= List of Archie Comics characters =

The following is a list of characters in the Archie Comics universe. Licensed characters like Sonic the Hedgehog and Mega Man are not included in this list.

== Archie series ==
=== Main characters ===
==== Archie Andrews ====
The character Archie Andrews, created by John L. Goldwater, Bob Montana and Vic Bloom, first appeared in a humor strip in Pep Comics #22 (December, 1941).

Within the context of the strip and the larger series that grew out of it, Archie is a typical teenage boy, attending high school, participating in sports, and dating. He is extremely kind, caring, brave and accident-prone and many of his actions, however well-intentioned, inadvertently harm the people he tries to help. He is not that academically inclined and brings home average grades. He is athletic and loves sports. He also has a love of cars and fixing them. He is also known for being easily infatuated by the many girls he meets. His never ending love triangle between Betty, the girl next door, and Veronica, the wealthy socialite, form the most common Archie stories. Archie's other love interests include Cheryl Blossom and Valerie Smith of Josie and the Pussycats.

==== Betty Cooper ====
Betty is the kind-hearted, caring, talented, athletic, culinarily talented and intelligent girl next door. She is romantically obsessed with Archie but usually ends up playing second fiddle to her best friend and romantic rival Veronica Lodge. In some stories, Archie seems to prefer Betty over Veronica. She has a passion for writing and is a good student, detective and auto mechanic. She cares deeply for the well-being of others and is always ready to help people with their problems. She is the youngest child with two older siblings, an older sister named Polly and an older brother named Chic.

==== Veronica Lodge ====
Veronica (sometimes called Ronnie or Ron by her close friends) is a very rich girl, the daughter of the super wealthy multi-billionaire and business tycoon and industrialist Hiram Lodge. She is known to be the richest girl in Riverdale. She is a spendthrift, quite spoiled and vain, but is friendly, compassionate, caring, selfless, and generous. She gets along well with most of her classmates no matter their financial status. Like her best friend Betty, she is romantically obsessed with Archie and constantly competes for his affection, usually winning over Archie's affections. She rarely gets along with Jughead Jones due to his lazy demeanor, though occasionally they set aside their differences, albeit usually to get Archie out of trouble.

==== Jughead Jones ====
Forsythe Pendleton "Jughead" Jones III, is Archie's best friend since childhood. A slim boy with a huge appetite. Sarcastic, snarky and smart, Jughead is uninterested in girls. Despite this, he's able to form friendships with girls, such as Betty. Jughead often bails Archie out of trouble when he acts impulsively and rashly. He almost always wears his trademark whoopee cap. He has a younger sister named Jellybean.

==== Reggie Mantle ====
Archie's main rival, particularly for Veronica's affections. Though they are ultimately good friends, he often taunts Archie and does not understand why girls prefer to date him. He is highly vain and conceited, thinks he can date anyone he wants, and expects everyone to think the world of him. He likes to pick on others, especially Jughead and Archie. He is always trying to get a date with Veronica but when they did date Veronica cheated on Reggie with Archie and he then dumps Veronica.

==== Moose Mason ====
Marmaduke "Moose" Mason is a muscular, handsome star athlete but is a poor student. He often says "duh" at the beginning of sentences, and is possessive about his girlfriend Midge. He also is known to be dyslexic. He is dimwitted and can be easily manipulated by others, particularly Reggie. He will beat up anyone (particularly Reggie) who upsets him or even talks to Midge, the latter being a point of friction between the couple. At the same time, he is also kind, sensitive and helpful toward his closest friends.

==== Dilton Doiley ====
A highly intelligent nerd and inventor. He gets A's in every class except physical education and is the favorite student of most of his teachers, especially Professor Flutesnoot and Mr. Weatherbee. He is not especially interested in dating and is shy around girls, though he has shown interest in a few girls in the series, specially Betty Cooper whom he has a huge crush on. Despite his quirks, he fits in well with the gang, who often rely on his brains. He and Moose are best friends, despite their contrasting personalities.

==== Midge Klump ====
Moose's girlfriend who is often frustrated with his jealousy and lack of intelligence but still loves him dearly. Boys cannot even talk to her without incurring Moose's wrath. In reality however, she does not often show interest in other boys. Reggie is particularly attracted to her.

==== Ethel Muggs ====
A tall, stringy, somewhat dorky but goodhearted teenager who always tries to win over Jughead, albeit unsuccessfully. Portrayed as plain and gawky in appearance, she has many close friends and leads an active social life.

==== Chuck Clayton ====
Initially a shy loner, he came out as one of the most popular students in school. He is a very talented athlete and enjoys cartooning for fun. He has been a close friend of Archie's since his introduction.

==== Nancy Woods ====
Chuck's steady girlfriend. She does not take an interest in other boys, being devoted to Chuck alone. However, she is often annoyed with his paying more attention to his hobbies than her. Nancy enjoys sports, fashion, cheerleading and journalism, and is a close friend of the other girls.

==== Hiram Lodge ====
Veronica's father, and the richest man in all of Riverdale. He's a multi-billionaire and is one of the richest men in the world. Hiram is usually portrayed as being an industrialist and he's the CEO of his multi-billionaire dollar company Lodge Industries. Hiram is a good, caring yet strict father towards Veronica. He often spoils her despite his attempts at trying to prevent Veronica from letting her wealth and privilege turn her into a typical spoiled rich kid. He always dreads meeting Archie due to Archie's clumsiness and knack for causing him trouble. He tolerates Archie, however, because he knows of Archie's more redeeming qualities, and allows his daughter to date whom she chooses.

==== Mr. Waldo Weatherbee ====
The school principal, popularly referred to as 'The Bee'. A former United States Marine known for being obese and bald, he is often a victim of Archie's clumsiness, which often puts the latter in detention. He is often, however, quite helpful and friendly to students.

==== Miss Geraldine Grundy ====
Geraldine Grundy
- Archie character
- First appearance: Jackpot Comics #4 (Winter 1941; as Mrs. Mimi Grundy); Pep Comics #30 (April 1942; as Miss Grundy)
- Portrayed by: Fran Ryan (Archie: To Riverdale and Back Again); Sarah Habel (Riverdale)
- Voiced by: Jane Webb (1968–1976); Linda Sorenson (1987)
- Hometown: Riverdale

In-universe information
- Occupation: Teacher

A teacher at Riverdale High. She is usually portrayed as an English teacher, though she is occasionally shown teaching other subjects. She is well-aged, slim with white hair, and her personality alternates between harsh and motherly. A younger version of Miss Grundy was portrayed by Sarah Habel in Riverdale.

An early version of Miss Grundy appears in Jackpot Comics #4 (Winter 1941). In this appearance, she is Mrs. Mimi Grundy, the married principal of Riverdale High School. She is reintroduced as "Miss Grundy" in Pep Comics #30 (April 1942), the no-nonsense homeroom teacher at Riverdale High School, occasionally teaching English and math as well. Her name is derived from Mrs Grundy, a name that has been used to refer to a prudish woman since the early nineteenth century. Before she became a teacher, she worked at a pickle-packing plant. During World War II, she served with the WACs, outranking Mr. Weatherbee. Despite occasional grumblings from her students, they seem to genuinely like and admire her. She, in return, tends to drive them hard, pushing Archie Andrews and Moose Mason in particular, but remains quite fond of her students.

Her first name is most often given as Geraldine. However, at least once, another staff member called her "Amanda". She was also called "Alice" in at least one mainstream story. In Archie's Double Digest (#41), she was revealed to be an alumna herself of Riverdale High School, and had run for class president, in a joke about the need to clean off the bulletin board. Her forename was given as "Elizabeth" in The Archie and Sabrina Hour, as "Geri" in Archie's Weird Mysteries books, and as "Doris" in the animated series Archie's Weird Mysteries. In one story about Jughead Jones's correct first name, it was revealed as "Grisensnable". In an earlier Archie book that listed the names of the characters, her name was also "Gertrude". Additionally, in the story "Vive la France" (first printed in Life with Archie #22), she signs the hotel registry book as "Abigail". Nevertheless, Geraldine remains her commonly accepted name.

In Life with Archie: The Married Life, Miss Grundy and Mr. Weatherbee realized how much they loved each other, and got married. However, in this alternative future, she died from kidney disease not long afterward, leaving Mr. Weatherbee a broken-hearted widower.

In Afterlife with Archie, she and Mr. Weatherbee were chaperoning for the Halloween school dance. They took a break outside to reminisce about the time they snuck into the Cypress Cemetery as children and make references about Night of the Living Dead. Their conversation is cut off at the appearance of a zombified Jughead who mauls Mr. Weatherbee. It is revealed Miss Grundy was turned into a zombie shortly afterwards. In Chilling Adventures of Sabrina, Miss Grundy is the High Priestess of witch coven that Betty and Veronica are members of. She warned them against summoning a succubus to deal with their rivalry about Archie.

==== In other media ====
- Ms. Grundy appears in Archie's Weird Mysteries, where the episode "Twisted Youth" reveals her first name to be Doris, although the tie-in comics refer to her as Geraldine.
  - Ms. Grundy is mentioned in the TV film The Archies in JugMan, where Archie notes that she loves to give pop quizzes.
- In Riverdale, Miss Grundy is a much younger woman played by Sarah Habel. In the fourth episode of the series it is revealed that Grundy moved to Riverdale after changing her name from Jennifer Gibson after her divorce, to escape from an abusive relationship. Since then Grundy has moved from Riverdale to avoid police capture because of her relationship with Archie. When Betty is searching for Miss Grundy online, she finds a Miss Grundy who died years prior to the beginning of the series, with her obituary picture closely resembling the Miss Grundy of the comic book series. In the season two premiere, it is revealed she is living in Greendale and "teaching" another young male student, before she is strangled to death by Black Hood with her own cello bow.

==== Pop Tate ====
"Pop" Tate
- Archie character
- First appearance: Pep Comics #46
- Created by: Bob Montana
- Portrayed by: Mike Nussbaum (Archie: To Riverdale and Back Again); Alvin Sanders (Riverdale)
- Voiced by: Dallas McKennon (The Archie Show); Ryle Smith (Archie's Weird Mysteries, The Archies in Jugman)
- Hometown: Riverdale

In-universe information
- Occupation: Owner of Pop's Chock'lit Shoppe

Terry "Pop" Tate is the owner and manager of the Chok'lit Shoppe, an ice cream parlor and frequent hangout of Archie's Gang. Pop Tate is the self-designated philanthropist for the Archie gang, hearing about their ups and downs while serving ice cream and an assortment of other tasty treats. He is a portly, thinning-haired, mustachioed gentleman who can seem gruff but is basically good-hearted. He is friends with Archie's gang. He is proud of his culinary talent.

Jughead is Pop Tate's best customer. Tate constantly talks about how Jughead's appetite will provide for his retirement. Many stories reflect the fact that his customers, particularly Jughead, don't always pay their tab. Jughead has been known to run his tab as long as possible, and put off paying it until Pop refuses any more credit.

In a comic centered on Pop, it was shown that he has a cousin named Russell, who runs a similar soda shop in the mountains. In the 2000s, his main rival was Segarini, the pizza parlor owner, a minor but recurring character.

Like many things in the Archie continuity, Pop Tate's history has inconsistencies. In one installment of the series, it was revealed that Pop's dad was the original "Pops," while as a child he served at his side under the moniker "Junior." But some stories say that Pop opened the business himself. In still another comic, he purchased it as a young man from the retiring owner McGurk. Some stories have given Pop's real first name as Bob, Harold, Leo or Thomas, and in one story, it was given as Clark, but the official Archie Comics website gives his name as Terry. In the TV show “Riverdale,” the jolly dessertmaker's proper name is given as Terence.

Pop's shop has changed little over the years, and it still boasts a jukebox and old-time soda fountain. Attempts at times for Pop to "modernize" the shop have all failed; and Pop's has retained its old-fashioned ice cream parlor atmosphere. This has allowed him to capitalize on nostalgia.

A fairly common plot is Pop Tate closing his shop and trying to sell it, which results in Archie and his friends scrambling to save it, generally by reminding everyone about the memories they have of the store, and telling them that losing the store would be horrible. One particular comic had the owner of the block giving an eviction notice to Pop to vacate the store in a week so he could build a 12-screen movie theater. As he and the gang go through stuff in the basement of the shop, they find enough evidence that the building is a historical landmark, which saves the shop and forces the land owner to build only a 6-screen theater.

The character of Pop Tate was inspired by the Greek immigrant owners of the three soda fountains frequented by Haverhill teenagers during the 1930s. These were the Crown Confectionery and the Chocolate Shop on Merrimack Street and the Tuscarora on Winter Street.

In the late 1930s, Archie creator Bob Montana joined other teens at the Chocolate Shop counter where he made sketches on napkins or in the diary-sketchbook he kept of Haverhill happenings. This material served as a source for Montana when he launched Archie.

Pop Tate has a recurring role in The CW's Riverdale, played by Alvin Sanders.

==== Kevin Keller ====
The first openly gay character in Archie Comics. This fact earned him a great deal of attention in American comic media. He first appeared in Veronica #202. Veronica was deeply attracted to him, but was initially unaware of his sexuality, so Jughead took advantage of this situation to avenge himself against Veronica for humiliating him. Kevin's sexuality is not presented as controversial or stereotypical in the comics, keeping with Archie Comics' image of accepting diversity and inclusion. Kevin is an aspiring journalist, with many hobbies including collecting comics and competitive eating. He has two younger sisters, his father is a retired Army Colonel and his mother is a housewife. Kevin's closest friends in Riverdale are Veronica and Jughead, along with Wendy and William, friends from a previous school.

==== Family members ====
- Fred Andrews: Archie's middle-class businessman father. Highly conservative and old-fashioned, he is frequently bothered by his son's behavior, partly due to the generation gap. However, he and Archie have a number of common interests, and share many father/son activities. He has a pear-shaped build and is losing his hair.
- Mary Andrews: Archie's typical all-American suburban mother who works for a real estate agency. She is more tolerant of Archie's behavior than her husband, and is usually the only one who can maintain order in the house.
- Hermione Lodge: Veronica's slender, white-haired mother and a wealthy patrician. She is often involved in charity work, and is a member of a number of ladies' social groups. She appears far less frequently than her husband, however, and rarely plays a significant role.
- Hubert Smithers: The bald, portly butler to the Lodge Mansion and the most frequently seen family servant. A running gag is how Archie annoys Smithers as much as he annoys Mr. Lodge, and Smithers takes great pleasure in throwing Archie out of the house. Despite his frustration with Archie's clumsiness, he remains faithful to the Lodges.
- Gaston: The French cook for the Lodge family. Gaston is often still in Archie Comics today. He is often frustrated when Veronica tries to cook in "his" kitchen.
- Hal Cooper: Betty's middle-class but hard-working and civic-minded father who works as a druggist. Often frustrated by his daughter's antics and perplexed by the female nature, he nevertheless supports Betty in whatever she does. He also introduced Betty to sports, and is proud of her.
- Alice Cooper: Betty's caring, highly supportive mother who is a close friend of Mary Andrews and Hermione Lodge. They have a close mother/daughter bond, but she hopes that Betty will outgrow her tomboy phase.
- Polly and Charles Cooper: Betty's older sister and older brother who debuted in the Little Archie, but later became part of the main continuity. Polly is a reporter in San Francisco and Chic is a secret agent for the government.
- Forsythe Pendleton Jones II: Jughead's father, who looks just like his son, only older and balding. Sometimes he is portrayed just as lazy as his son is. As a teenager, he enjoyed sports, and wishes Jughead would take an interest in them too. Though he occasionally deals with money problems, he is a good provider for his family.
- Gladys Jones: Jughead's mother. While she mainly stays home to take care of her daughter, she is, in reality, the hardest working member of her family, always trying to get her son to do his chores.
- Forsythia "Jellybean" Jones: Jughead's little sister whose age varies from infant to preschooler depending on the story; she can sometimes manage simple words, and sometimes only speaks in thought bubbles. Despite her youth she knows whom to trust. Jellybean idolizes her brother, who devotes much of his time to babysitting and playing with her.
- Hot Dog: Jughead's faithful pet dog, a mutt who resembles a sheepdog, who is sometimes a mascot for the gang. Capable of conscious thought, he behaves in rather human-like ways and often doesn't consider himself a pet. He and Jughead have much in common, namely their appetites and laziness.
- Uncle Herman: Jughead's Uncle Herman who always creates trouble for Jughead (and himself) when visiting.
- Souphead: Jughead's cousin Souphead who looks like a mini version of Jughead.

=== Faculty of Riverdale High School ===
==== Major recurring characters ====
- Mr. Flutesnoot (Professor Elmer Benjamin Flutesnoot): A science teacher, usually chemistry, and also at times the band teacher (particularly in Little Archie) in whose face Archie's chemistry experiments blow up. His favorite student is Dilton, due to Dilton's high marks and passion for science, and the two frequently collaborate on projects.
- Coach Kleats: The head physical education teacher who loses his temper when things do not go his way. He first appeared in Pep Comics #24. Atypically overweight for an athletic coach, he was a fantastic athlete when he was younger, and can play well to a certain extent. He mainly teaches baseball and American football and has an encyclopaedic knowledge of both. He is known to have unstable interpersonal relationships due to his irritability. He has a constant problem in getting the athletic best out of his students and sometimes considers Archie and Jughead inadequate. He always tries his best to get Archie and Reggie's minds off girls and Jughead to stop being lazy and make an effort, but rarely succeeds for long. He often gets undesired advice from Mr. Weatherbee on how to turn his losing teams around. At one point, he gets so frustrated that he resigns to allow Weatherbee to coach the basketball team his way. Weatherbee's overly conservative offense resulted in the Bulldogs losing every game, setting a record for fewest points scored and the fans demanding Kleats' rehiring. Sometimes he worries that he has grown too old for the job, particularly in contrast to his friend and fellow gym teacher, the trim Coach Clayton. In one story, it is revealed that he has arthritis in his hand. He thought that it would mean the end of his career as an athletic coach, but Archie helped him realize that his ability to teach is what really counts.
- Coach Harry (originally Floyd) Clayton: Chuck's dad, a physical education teacher who is portrayed as warm and open to his students when they have problems. He is the basketball and wrestling coach and the only major faculty member who is known to be married. Coach Clayton is a physical education teacher at Riverdale High School who believes in practicing and experimenting with various methods for teaching students. He is also very open and warm, which has led many in the student body to seek out his advice as well as tell him about their problems. Unlike his fellow phys-ed teacher Coach Kleats, he is in excellent physical condition—although both men are very good athletes. He coaches the school's basketball and wrestling teams. In the late-1990s, he began to work beyond physical education, and also taught a history class. Coach Clayton's first name is either Floyd or Harry, as he has been called Floyd many times by faculty in regular digest stories. The name was created in his early appearances, and used for some time afterwards. However, in some later comics, such as the Faculty Funnies miniseries where Mr. Weatherbee, Mr. Flutesnoot, Miss Grundy and Coach Clayton were secretly superheroes who all possessed superpowers, Clayton was referred to as Harry. In still more recent appearances, such as Tales from Riverdale #1, his name is still Harry. (Note: In one story, shown in Archie's Pals 'n' Gals Double Digest #120, Harry was recuperating from a fever and because Coach Kleats (who normally coaches football and baseball) was leading the basketball team, they were at first getting defeated. Then Alice, Harry's wife, decided to take over the coaching duties— this brought Riverdale to tie the score in the second half and brought the game into overtime. With Archie scoring the winning basket and bringing the team to victory, the team led Mrs. Clayton out on their shoulders. Harry recuperated and returned to work, more out of fear that Alice would permanently take over his coaching duties than anything.)
- Miss Bernice Beazley: The somewhat grouchy school cafeteria cook. Other than Jughead and Mr. Weatherbee, people often dislike her cooking, but the students always stand beside her. Close friends with Mr. Svenson, she is sometimes revealed to have a soft caring side underneath her attitude. Having originally been trained as a military mess chef, she is also the only faculty member in the entire school who is not afraid to speak her mind or otherwise stand up to Patton Howitzer; when he first appears in the school as a substitute principal for Mr. Weatherbee during his absence due to a football-game-related injury, Miss Beazley temporarily quits in an enraged huff when she finds Mr. Howitzer's heavy-handed manner and verbal abuse intolerable.
- Mr. Svenson: The Swedish bus driver and school custodian who is generally good toward the students, who sometimes help him out if he has problems. He often stays at school when it is closed and cleans. Though not the most brilliant person around, he does have practical sense.
- Miss Haggly: Supposedly the eldest teacher in the school, she is overweight with white hair and a shriveled face. Despite her age, she acts surprisingly hip and is rarely troubled by the antics of teenagers. She has been featured less and less in the comics since the 1990s, though is by no means a retired character.
- Patton Howitzer: A crazed, ultra-strict former Drill Sergeant who rules the students with an iron fist. He's typically used as a war-obsessed enforcer to Mr. Weatherbee, and is the meanest of all the teachers.
- Miss Phlips: Mr. Weatherbee's secretary, a fairly attractive woman compared to other female faculty members. She has not been around as long as many other well-known faculty members. She is portrayed as a young, attractive woman, unlike aging faculty members like Miss Grundy, Miss Beazley, Miss Haggly and other faculty members who have looked old since the early years of Archie Comics. Notably, her name is spelled "Phlips" with one "i", instead of her having the common last name "Philips". Calm, efficient and reliable, she often acts as a liaison for the students and holds together what little order is possible at the school.
- Superintendent Herkimer Hassle: The superintendent of the local school district and Mr. Weatherbee's superior. Mr. Weatherbee frequently worries when Superintendent Hassle visits the school, though Hassle is often more impressed with the students' actions than with Weatherbee's. In some older stories, he was called Superintendent Smith.

==== Minor characters ====
- Mr. Jenkins: An old man with a white beard who was the original school counselor at Riverdale High. He got replaced by Mr. Grimley because Mr. Jenkins ended up suffering from a nervous breakdown. Mr. Jenkins is currently in the hospital and seems to be responding well to treatment.
- Mr. Grimley: Mr. Jenkins's replacement. He often suffered severe ulcers after hearing the Riverdale students' outlandish career plans. He did not stay at Riverdale very long, for obvious reasons. At some point, he apparently switched to teaching Driver's Education, hoping it would be less stressful, but found it caused him the same problems.
- Ms. Burble: The most recent counselor at Riverdale High. Like her predecessors, this African-American woman is bothered by the students' silly career ideas, but always manages to keep her cool about it, and it never affects her health. Originally called Miss Burble, but in Tales of Riverdale #1, she was called Mrs. Burble, implying that she has since married.
- Mr. Malcolm Meeks: A timid substitute teacher in the 1980s. He eventually revealed that his timorous nature was the result of his frustration at having been unable to save a comrade when he served in the Vietnam War. Finally Meeks found peace with himself when he saved the victims of a helicopter crash, and took a full-time teaching job at the nearby Tri-City College Preparatory High School. He was just minutes away from the local airport where he would spend his after school hours investigating the wonders of flight. Someday, he mused, he would fly with the local Blue Eagles Team and touch the sky and go beyond the limits of the clouds. Like many characters, he disappeared from view. It is revealed in a later comic that he has moved to Central High to teach.
- Mr. Elmer Fluteweed or Mr. Philo Fluteweed: The original music teacher and band instructor. He seems to have been an early version of Mr. Flutesnoot and as such has not appeared in many years — this ambiguity makes giving a definitive first appearance impossible. He has mainly appeared in the Little Archie universe.
- Miss Crouton: The school's Home Economics teacher, primarily seen in the early 1990s, and on and off in later years (including Betty and Veronica Spectacular # 71 and the cover of Archie # 565).
- Mr. Kroskut (sometimes referred to as "Mr. Wood"); A surly, sarcastic shop teacher with a perpetual scowl on his chiseled face. He has not been seen since the 1980s.
- Mr. Adams: A Humanities teacher who first appeared in Archie & Friends #117. He is an internationalist, and believes travel abroad is educational. In his first year at Riverdale High, he was able to organize a five-city European & African trip for Riverdale students (including Archie and the gang). Mr. Adams is African-American.
- Patti Pacer and Greta Grappler: Riverdale High's female coaches who specifically teach the girls' teams. Pacer, appearing in 1988, was the faculty sponsor for the cheerleading squad. She was noted for pushing the team and holding grueling practices, which led to success. Coach Kleats found her implausibly young to teach and was initially reluctant to accept her. Later stories featured Grappler, a tough, aggressive coach with a bulky, muscular build, contrasting the physically attractive Patti Pacer.
- Mr. Stanger: The new principal of Riverdale High following Mr. Weatherbee's forced early retirement. He is hired due to the school board deciding to update Riverdale High with a more modern curriculum which includes new teaching staff. He first appears in Jughead (vol. 3) #1.
- Other, short-lived recurring teachers include Miss Simpkins (Mathematics), Ms. Shapely (substitute teacher, 1970s-1980s), Ms. Samantha Lovett (Drama teacher, 1987), Mr. Money (Art, 1980s), Ms. Kandinsky (Art, early 1990s), Mr. Flores (Computer Science, early 1990s), and Mr. Jordan (shop class).

=== Auxiliary members of Archie's gang ===
- Adam Chisholm: A young guy who moved to Riverdale in Betty #87. He is lanky, with brown hair, a thin face, and a medium-built frame. He is slightly taller than Archie or Reggie. He enjoys playing sports such as surfing and football. As soon as he arrived, he became one of Betty's dating partners. He is Archie's main rival for Betty's affections. After he was introduced, he was deeply in love with Betty. She started falling for him, which gave her a dilemma: should she stay with Archie who frequently neglected her, or leave him for Adam? Readers were asked what she should do. This was followed up in Betty #99 and #100, where Betty appeared to be leaving Archie for good, but the two-part story ended with Betty doing what readers voted for: date both. She continues to do so to this day. Like the Blossom twins, Adam has proven a successful addition to the infamous love triangle (though, with Reggie, Adam and the Blossom twins involved, it is not really a triangle anymore). Archie thinks very poorly of him, but he's only prejudiced against Adam because he doesn't want him to steal Betty from him. One of the few times when Archie gives Betty his undivided attention is when there's a chance of Adam getting a date with her. Adam shows little interest in any other girl. In Jughead & Friends #1, his date for a dance was Ginger Lopez, but that was mainly because Betty was already going to the dance with Archie.
- Fangs Fogarty: A fat, snaggle-toothed bully who tormented Archie, Jughead and Reggie in their younger years, principally in the pages of Little Archie, and who prominently appeared on the cover of its thirtieth issue. Fangs was an unreasonable thug who brutally battered his classmates, either because they looked at his self-appointed girlfriend Penny, they insulted him behind his back, or for no reason at all. He was, however, good friends with Dilton. When, in one story, Archie and Reggie (not yet knowing this) learned that Dilton is a karate expert—surpassed, he says, only by his friend Edward—they persuaded him to confront Fangs, presuming Dilton could beat him up. In preparation for the encounter, Archie and Reggie deliberately provoked Fangs into a fit of rage. However, when Dilton arrived, he cheerfully greeted Fangs as "Edward." Presumably, Fangs moved away at around the time Moose Mason arrived in Riverdale. Fangs eventually showed up in the mainstream comics in a story titled "Blast from the Past", first printed in Archie's Double Digest #117 (August 2000). Now a tall, muscular, handsome young man nicknamed Smiley after getting his orthodontic work, he had returned to Riverdale to apologize to those he had formerly antagonized. In this story, Fangs' first name is given as Fred instead of Edward.
- Leroy Lodge: Veronica's young cousin who is apparently in Elementary School. He is something of a troublemaker and prankster. He has been a minor but consistently recurring character since the 1940s.
- Ginger Lopez: A Latina-American girl who lives in Riverdale with her parents and her younger twin sisters Eliza and Teresa. To keep her from being confused with Maria Rodriguez, she has blonde bangs and a single mole on her cheek. Ginger works as teen editor for "Sparkle Magazine". She works with many models, and Betty and Veronica often help her create new fashion lines. "Sparkle" is located in New York City and Ginger spends half of her time there and the other half in Riverdale. She has no permanent boyfriend, and frequently dates outside of her ethnicity, unlike Maria and Nancy. Her introduction, starting with her first appearance in Betty and Veronica Spectacular #50, was a bit different from other characters. In the early 2000s, she was originally intended to replace Cheryl Blossom, whom the creators of Archie Comics thought was not popular enough to keep in the comics. In some story reprints, Cheryl's hair was re-colored and the text was changed to have her be replaced by Ginger in the story. Many fans were not happy with this, so Cheryl was brought back once again, and Ginger was given stories of her own as a separate character. Initially, Ginger had Cheryl's personality, and so appeared to be a rival of Veronica. But with Cheryl's return, there was no need for this, so Ginger's mean streak was dropped and she became a much nicer character.
- Jinx Malloy: A gloomy, scrawny fellow who causes horrible calamity wherever he goes, and thus has earned the scorn of Riverdale's citizens, who often take great lengths to avoid him. Archie and his friends are often victims of the misfortune he spreads. Stories featuring him tend to be about the characters trying to protect themselves from the bad luck he causes. Sometimes, Archie and the gang use his bad luck to influence their enemies. He usually appears slightly shorter than most of the gang, and has sandy hair and a prominent, angular nose. When he causes trouble, he doesn't seem to know it's happening, so he doesn't know why people avoid him or call him "Jinx". This implies that Jinx is not his real first name. Although he appeared at least as early as the 1960s (Archie's Pal Jughead #135) and has continued to make appearances since, he still only appears occasionally and randomly. This makes him and Cricket O'Dell the longest-lasting minor adolescent characters in Archie Comics. Briefly, Jinx had a girlfriend known as Lucky Penny because of her constant good luck. She was the only one who could be around him without becoming victim to his bad luck influence because extremely good luck came to her whatever she did. Her good luck did not work on anyone else, so Jinx would cause as much bad luck as ever. However, Penny was not a long-lasting character, and appeared only in a couple of stories.
- Marcy McDermott: Veronica's nerdy freshman cousin who first came to visit in Veronica #181 and continues to visit her now and then. She is a devoted fan of science fiction who enjoys comic book conventions. Veronica is a bit indifferent towards her lifestyle, but Marcy still hangs around and sometimes works as Veronica's assistant whenever needed.
- Cricket O'Dell: A pert, friendly girl with an amazing talent: she is able to smell money or monetary values. Her nose can also determine whether treasure is genuine or not. Despite this trait, she remains humble, and her friends (most particularly Archie Andrews, Betty Cooper and Veronica Lodge) swear by her ability. Her debut suggests that Mr. Lodge also has this unusual ability, and is quite disappointed in Veronica for her lack of it. In one story she not only could smell money but was in love with it. She would fall in love any boy who had money, and once suspected Archie of being one of them because he dated Veronica Lodge. Nowadays she is not portrayed as loving money but simply as possessing the ability to smell it. First introduced in the Archie #133 (1962), Cricket appeared in the mainstream stories as well as the pre-Pussycats Josie series. In one story, Alexandra Cabot used Cricket's ability to her advantage. Cricket soon disappeared from the comics, but was later brought back into view. Like a number of other characters, her appearances proved to have extremely limited use. She has appeared sporadically since then, as she often moves in and out of the cast, but she has yet to be officially retired. Cricket shares some physical resemblance with Archie— namely red hair and freckles— despite being unrelated. Jason Blossom once thought of her as a novelty and brought her to meet his frat brothers. His plan to impress them backfired, as the overwhelming aroma of money knocked her out cold and even burned her nostrils.
- Ambrose Pipps: A small, shy boy with a large nose and an outsized baseball cap pulled over his face. Like Fangs Fogarty, most of his appearances have been in the Little Archie series, although for one issue in 1958 he had his own comic, Little Ambrose. Ambrose was the tagalong of Archie's gang when they were young. Although Ambrose's loyalty was unflagging, Little Archie took pride in bullying and exploiting him, without ever letting him join the "good ol' gang." Although a teenage Archie was apprehensive when Ambrose returned to Riverdale after several years' absence, Ambrose held no grudges, and the two became good friends. In the story "The Great Quiz Whiz Contest" reprinted in Archie's Pals 'n' Gals #108, Archie pulls out his lucky double sided penny from his pocket that his pal Ambrose gave him. Both Ambrose and Fangs have very brief cameos in Tales From Riverdale Digest #24.
- Raj Patel: Yet another new student at Riverdale High. Raj is of Indian descent and lives with his father Ravi, his mother Mona and his sister Tina. He befriended Archie after moving to town and first arrived in Tales From Riverdale Digest #21. Raj's favorite hobby is filmmaking. He is an expert on no budget special effects, and builds his own models for science fiction movies. He is well liked at school, but sometimes his filmmaking gets on people's nerves. Ravi Patel is a doctor who wishes his son would take up more serious issues, while Mona is more supportive. Tina is a year younger than Raj, but she is such a good student that she was moved up a grade so that both she and Raj are in the same year as Archie and the gang. After Raj's introduction, he often appeared in daily newspaper strips as well.
- Brigitte Reilly: A brown haired, amply contoured girl who was introduced in the late-1990s and who is close to Betty and Veronica. She is an exchange student from Waynesboro High, Centerville. Betty was the first one to meet her and introduced to Veronica and others. Brigitte is one of the few female teenagers in the Archie Comics universe without an hourglass figure. Although she lacks the sexy appearance of most of Riverdale's girls, she is not portrayed in a comical or unflattering way (as she might have in the early years of Archie), but has been made as attractive as possible. Briefly, Maria was actually jealous of Brigitte's friendship with Frankie. When she was introduced in Betty and Veronica Spectacular #27, she joined the school show, and turned out to be good at singing. She's also a guitarist, and has a record deal in Central City. In a few stories, she is in a musical duet consisting of herself and Frankie Valdez—she sings and Frankie plays the guitar—but in other stories, she is often a solo artist. When the Spice Girls were popular, she, Betty and Veronica formed a group called the Sassy Girls. However, Brigitte outshone the others, so Betty and Veronica returned to the Archies and let Brigitte go solo. Brigitte is known to date Dilton Doiley. Generally peaceful and friendly, Brigitte is on good terms with everyone in Riverdale. For a minor character, she has been featured prominently on the Archie Comics website.
- Maria Rodriguez: Frankie Valdez' girlfriend, a Hispanic girl who started out as shy but friendly, and a bit of a “plain Jane,” as in her first appearance in Archie's Girls Betty and Veronica #257. Despite this, she eventually evolved into a more forceful and fiery character. In the past, she was seldom seen except in conjunction with Frankie. She was introduced as the daughter of the new vice-principal Mr. Rodriguez. While Maria continued to appear, her father did not. Frankie and Maria were added for ethnic diversity, following the success of Chuck and Nancy. The four of them became good friends. For a time, she had black hair and usually wore it in a bun. This was quickly changed to brown flowing hair. Maria is well liked among Archie's gang. Initially, when Frankie and Brigitte became a musical duet, Maria got jealous. She was worried that he was going to leave her for Brigitte, and came to realize that the two are just friends. Along with Chuck and Nancy, and Moose and Midge, Frankie and Maria are one of the few definite couples in Archie Comics. She is also a friend of Betty and Veronica.
- Trula Twyst: A femme fatale introduced in a three-part miniseries in Jughead #89-91. She formed an organization of girls called J.U.S.T. (Jughead Under Surveillance Team) to help make Jughead forget about food, television, and oversleeping in favour of girls. The resulting battle of the sexes was ultimately a draw and Jughead retained his old ways. She still occasionally appears and causes trouble for him. A student of psychology, she studies the behaviour of her peers, especially Jughead's, and is able to predict his every move. While Reggie's schemes against Jughead tend to backfire, Jughead can't escape Trula. Her mother is Krista Twyst, a well-known writer.
- Frankie Valdez: A student of Puerto Rican ancestry, Frankie is flamboyant, romantic, quick-witted, and a bit of a show-off, which has earned him the rivalry of Reggie Mantle. After his first appearance in Archie Comics #265, many considered him to be simply another Reggie, although he is nowhere near the exaggerated narcissist/ladies man that Reggie is. However, this comparison didn't prevent him from joining the cast permanently. He is good friends with Archie Andrews and Chuck Clayton. Maria is his long-suffering girlfriend, although their relationship has gone through many ups and downs through the years. The two had small roles in the first issue each of Tales From Riverdale Digest and Jughead and Friends Digest. Frankie sings and plays the guitar. He once won an American Idol-style competition, singing an original song he co-wrote with Maria. The Archies and Brigitte Reilly (Riverdale's token "chubby" girl) were among his competition. Frankie also is in a singing duet group with Brigitte. They are very popular in the Riverdale scene. Their partnership opened up the possibility of a new love triangle between Brigitte, Frankie and Maria, but it did not last. Frankie is also a great ballroom dancer.
- Wendy Weatherbee: The artistic, quirky and individualist niece of Riverdale High's principal Waldo Weatherbee. When she first arrived in Tales From Riverdale Digest #10, once the boys found out that she was Mr. Weatherbee's niece, they avoided her, afraid of upsetting the principal if they dated his niece. This makes it difficult for her to find a date.
- Tomoko Yoshida: A new Japanese exchange student who hangs around with Betty, starting after she is first seen in Betty #150. She was added in the early 2000s. She is an excellent writer and works on the school paper. Like Betty, her dream is to be a professional writer. Before her introduction, Asian people had been seen in the comics, but never as recurring characters. Other Asian teenagers may still appear, but Tomoko is the most frequently seen. She has a brother named Akira. Her relatives include the Morizawas: her Aunt Grace, Uncle Roy and their two young sons Shigeki (preteen) and Royce (toddler). To date, Tomoko has no steady boyfriend, although she occasionally attracts the attention of boys. She has been billed as the star of some stories, such as one where she based her fictional characters on Archie and the gang. Tomoko and her relatives particularly enjoy Japanese manga.

=== Other teenagers ===
==== 1940s-early 1960s ====
- Cora: A brown-haired girl who appeared only in single-page comic strips in the 1960s. She had Josie's classic hairdo (complete with a tiny bow), and was a girlfriend of Reggie.
- Debbie and Dilly Dalton: In the early years, identical blonde twins Debbie and Dilly Dalton appeared. Both pursued Jughead, but enjoyed sharing him.
- Eye-da: A student with one enormous eye where a head should be. She appeared at least twice in the late 1950s, usually as only an unexpected visual punchline at the end of a typical story featuring Betty and Veronica. However, she became a significant character many years later in one incarnation of Sabrina the Teenage Witch. When Sabrina and her aunts moved to Gravestone Heights, a city inhabited by witches, ghosts and monsters, Eye-da (who seemed less out of place there) and an invisible girl named Cleara Glass became Sabrina's best friends.
- Ophelia Gluetenschnable: This tall stringy girl evolved into Ethel Muggs, but was even less attractive than Ethel. Her boy-chasing tendencies, particularly toward Jughead, made her seem a bit crazy. In one story, she had unattractive friends Minnie Muenster and Sophie Schlitz who were interested in Archie and Reggie.
- Lottie Little: This petite blonde girl was actually an early concept of Midge because she dated Moose, and he beat up anyone who talked to her. She showed some romantic interest in Jughead.
- Streaky Shore: In the 1940s, he was a jock at Riverdale High. His nickname came from his ability to run fast. He was apparently conceived as a friend of Reggie, but didn't last beyond the first few years.
- Theodosius Tadpole: Theodosius (Theo for short) was an early concept of Dilton Doiley in the 1940s. After a few appearances, he was later renamed Dilbert, and finally Dilton. As Theodosius, he had a sister named May (a shy, bespectacled brunette, also a Riverdale High student), but Dilton appears to be an only child.
- U.G.A.J.: United Girls Against Jughead. This group of girls is a union dedicated to making Jughead start liking girls, lest other boys follow his lead. While Archie Comics had abandoned this organization (first formed in Archie's Pal Jughead #79 in the 1960s), Trula Twyst's introduction brought J.U.S.T. (Jughead Under Surveillance Team), a similar group that also targets Jughead's eating and sleeping habits as well as his dislike of girls. J.U.S.T. disappeared after Trula Twyst became a permanent character, but the saga's popularity spawned a reintroduction of U.G.A.J. (though, unlike J.U.S.T., they still only target Jughead's dislike of girls).

==== Late 1960s-1970s ====
- Angel Angelino: Even stronger than Moose and a bigger ladies man than Reggie, this character first appeared in the more serious "adventure" stories in Life With Archie, beginning with issue #80. While stories about him made him seem virtually infallible when compared to other boys at first, in the end it is revealed that he is not, indeed, perfect. As Reggie and Moose would have worked as well in his role, a more permanent stay for this character could not reasonably be justified.
- Aquarius: A hippie student with a laid-back outlook on life. A strict vegetarian ("I don't dig zappin' animals for food and rags, man"), he polarized the Archie gang with his views (so far as was allowed within Archie Comics, of course), but hasn't been seen since the 1970s.
- Berdie: A student from England, Berdie was a carefree character whose main humorous function was misunderstandings arising from his thick Cockney accent (for example, Miss Grundy once thought that Berdie was transferring to a private high school, when in reality he was going to a private eye school). Presumably Berdie eventually did change schools, as he hasn't been seen since the 1970s.
- Central High Students: Riverdale's biggest scholastic and athletic rival, Central High seems to consist of nothing but villainous types. The males are generally thuggish, conniving brutes, and the females are usually lecherous, scheming vamps. In most of their encounters, Central students seldom compete without using unsportsmanlike conduct, if not out-and-out cheating. Central's coaches and teachers are oftentimes not only aware of this skullduggery but actively encourage it. In most cases, Central's team color is bright red, contrasting with Riverdale's blue.
- Cheryl and Lori: Two girls who were apparently the forerunners of Debbie and Joani. After Jughead got a strange new hatpin, he began dating girls. Supposedly, the hatpin was like a love magnet: It made girls, particularly Cheryl and Lori, find him attractive. However, fans preferred the old Jughead, so his ladies-man tendencies disappeared quickly. Any later attempts to give Jughead girlfriends did not last long either. Cheryl, who was blonde, is not the same character as red-haired Cheryl Blossom, who first appeared years later.
- Geri: A girl who appeared a few times in single-page gags in the 1960s. She can be recognized by her long golden hair worn in a flip.

==== 1980s-early 1990s ====
- Adam the Alien: Adam debuted in Archie #280. While he appeared to be a white-haired human teenager with angular eyes, Adam is in reality an extraterrestrial being. Raised from infancy on a prison-like orphanage asteroid, Adam escaped and now makes his way through the universe trying to discover his home planet. Among Adam's talents are shapeshifting, teleportation and levitation. Adam spent some time at Riverdale looking for clues about his past, but ultimately moved on to other planets. Not to be confused with Adam Chisholm.
- Aerobic Liz: Liz is the local Riverdale aerobics instructor who appeared in a few stories in the early 1990s. She appears occasionally in Jughead and is fascinated by Jughead's metabolism but encourages him to be healthy. She has also taught Veronica an aerobics class when Veronica panicked over gaining some weight. She threw Veronica out of her place, but later Veronica said she admired Liz for standing up to her. She had red hair and freckles, but there was nothing to suggest a connection between her and Archie.
- Bunny and Cedric: Two students at Pembrooke Academy and sometime friends and co-conspirators of Cheryl and Jason Blossom. Cedric, who sports blonde curly hair, is Jason's best friend and occasionally accompanies him in his schemes as his sidekick, while black-haired Bunny is closer to Cheryl. As members of the Snob Hill Society, Bunny and Cedric disdain Cheryl and Jason's pursuit of Archie, Betty and Veronica (the "townies") and take steps towards sabotaging the relationships. Both Bunny and Cedric are perpetually suave and emotionally distant, and speak in very clipped and haughty tones. Bunny was renamed Priscilla in some later stories.
- Anita Chavita: A character that briefly appeared in the 1990s, who was both African-American and paraplegic. Rather than handling her disabilities naturally, Anita kept bringing them to the surface with comments like "my legs may not work, but at least my brain does". Ultimately she was jettisoned due to lack of reader interest. However, she is worthy of note because she was a love interest for both Jughead Jones and Dilton Doiley, making her the first instance, in an Archie comic, of interracial romance.
- Crystal the New Age Girl: A character briefly brought in to capitalize on the New Age movement, who endorsed transcendental meditation and the like. She ran a store of New Age products in the mall in the early 1990s. During this time, she made friends with Aerobic Liz, who ran the fitness centre next door. In her first appearance, she, Liz, and Veronica did a lively rap-style dance in her shop. Although she appears to be a hippie, she is not from the hippie era; mainstream popularity of the New Age came in the 1980s and 1990s. As the fad died out, Crystal made a quiet exit.
- Debbie and Joani: The two characters were introduced when the writers experimented with giving Jughead not one, but two romantic interests. This gave Jughead his own Betty-Archie-Veronica-style love triangle. Debbie was a new girl at Riverdale High whom Jughead developed a crush on, and Joani Jumpp was an old flame from Jughead's past who had moved to Riverdale and hoped to resume their relationship. While both Debbie and Joani dated Jughead for a time, and even became friends (Joani even got on at least one Digest cover), neither of them proved to be very long-lasting characters. After Jughead ceased dating the both of them (Debbie broke up with him, and Joani had to move away), both girls faded from view. They made a cameo appearance in Tales from Riverdale # 24 in the story Civil Chores Part 3.
- Claude and Raoul Hopper: Two acquaintances of Archie and the gang who were skilled in breakdancing. They had a rather bizarre role, often showing up out of the blue to provide sage advice to Archie, based on their inner-city background. Despite their mutual last name, Claude is tall and black and Raoul (sometimes spelled Raul) is short and white. As a dancing duo, they dubbed themselves the Hip Hoppers, and have been known to work with the Archies. The Hoppers have not been seen since the 1990s, though they have made some appearances in recent comics to help Archie and his friends whenever there was a problem.
- Dexter Howard: A college-age freshman that was introduced as a potential love interest for Betty, that would be introduced in order to create a love triangle between Betty, Archie, and Dexter. The character was originally conceived and drawn as African-American; however, the editor of Betty and Me objected to an interracial romance between Betty and an African-American male and had Dexter re-colored as a Caucasian male before the character's debut issue was printed. After a few appearances, Dexter was written out of Betty and Me and never reappeared in an Archie comic.
- Jeffrey: This blind boy, constantly seen with his guide dog Spike, was a love interest for Ethel Muggs. The idea for his character was based on the fact that the blind cannot judge people by appearance, so Jeff would find Ethel attractive in ways that most boys fail to notice. He was around at the same time as Anita (see above), and was dropped for the same reason.
- Lucky Penny: Penny was Jinx Malloy's short-lived girlfriend. Nicknamed "Lucky Penny", she had the ability to ward off Jinx's bad luck with her good luck. In her first appearance, everyone warned her about Jinx, but she still managed to find gold coins hidden under a tree and then got a job as a model for an advertising company, proving her immunity to Jinx's bad luck. She appeared at least twice.
- Pencil Neck G.: A geeky boy at Archie's school, he has long messy hair and a floppy wool hat that covers his eyes. He also appeared in the Freshman Years miniseries.
- The Potholes: A heavy metal band and friends of Jughead when he was infatuated with the skateboarding culture. While the four band members— Scud, Scum, Slime, and Slug— differed visually, they had no real personalities to speak of. Ultimately, Jughead quit hanging out with them, and they vanished.
- Glenn Scarpelli: It is rare for Archie Comics to feature actual celebrities in their comics rather than parodies of celebrities. However, in the 1980s, actor-singer Glenn Scarpelli, the son of Archie Comics artist Henry Scarpelli, made a few appearances, when his career was at its height.
- Sundance: A transfer student from California, Sundance is similar to Aquarius in that he is a "hippie" as well as a vegetarian. His Californian way of speaking (using terms like "bummed out") captured Betty and Veronica, but they began racing back when Sundance introduced his sister Moondance, who Archie and Reggie found extremely attractive.
- Sassy Thrasher: During the late-1980s and early 1990s, Jughead got a "skater punk" makeover. At this time, Sassy, like Anita, Jeff, and the Potholes, was added as a member of the Jughead cast. She was very rebellious and fond of skateboarding, but like the other characters in the makeover, didn't last very long, nor did the makeover itself.

==== Late 1990s ====
- Googie Gilmore: In the late 1990s, Jughead and his family moved to a different house in Riverdale. The next-door neighbours were the Gilmores. Their daughter Googie was obsessed with health food, and always tried to get Jughead to change his eating habits and give up junk food. However, before she stopped appearing, she and Jughead ended with a truce and a compromise.

==== Early 2000s ====
- Alison Adams: A spectacled brown-haired girl who appeared a few times in the 2000s. She belonged to the same science club as Dilton. The two were very friendly, but did not seem to become more than "just friends".
- Alistair Andrews: Archie's rich cousin who appeared in a couple of multipart stories. He looks exactly like Archie.
- Fletcher Foley: A member of the science club along with Dilton (his rival) and Alison. Has a crush on Alison, but she doesn't reciprocate. Always out to come out on top of Dilton, but more often as not, fails.
- Randy (Randolph): This cosmopolitan character moved to Riverdale for a while. He is built almost like Adam Chisholm, with a shoulder-length ponytail of brown hair, glasses, a black top hat with a red band, and sometimes a black cape with red lining. Randy enjoys the Japanese anime Captain Tuxedo, and wants to emulate this superhero. Randy has been known to date Veronica.
- Kim Wong: A Chinese teenager who moved to Riverdale after her father opened a branch of Wong Enterprises in Riverdale. She is good at martial arts, and is a friend of Betty and Veronica. Though she does not appear as often as Tomoko Yoshida, both are recurring characters. In this way, there are different characters to represent different regions of East Asia, rather than a single token character.

==== Late 2000s ====
- Austin, Brandon and George: Three boys matched with Cheryl Blossom when she went on the television show Lonely Hearts Club, following a break-up with Reggie. The five-part story entitled "And the Winner is..." was featured in Betty and Veronica Double Digest #161-165 in 2008. She would date three boys and the show's audience (represented by the readers) would vote for which one she ended up with. All three dates left something to be desired. Austin, a rugged outdoorsman, took the fun out of the date for Cheryl with his health obsession. Brandon, a rich computer expert, was a much bigger klutz than Archie and was originally depicted as African-American in the solicitation for the comic but had a much lighter skin tone in the actual comic. George, an aspiring master chef, attracted too many of his bothersome fans, including Jughead. In the end, according to the readers' votes, Cheryl was matched with George, which pleased her. At some point after this, Austin and Brandon dated Betty and Veronica.
- Toño Díaz: Toño was born in Mexico, and assists his parents, Adrián and Rosa in their party planning business. Rosa handles Public Relations and the administrative part of the business, while Adrián is responsible for the creative and labor portions of the family business. They arrived in Riverdale in Pal's 'n' Gals Double Digest #123. Toño enjoys helping them with gardening and decoration, but the part he likes the most is cooking. He wants to become a great chef when he grows up.
- Kumi Tanura: A Japanese girl who moved to Riverdale in Betty and Veronica Digest #190 with her parents and her younger sister Ami. Kumi finds the English language somewhat difficult. Two issues after her introduction, it was revealed that at home, her mother keeps up Japanese traditions and etiquette. Notably, Kumi stories are written by Misako Rocks!, a Japanese artist and writer who moved to NYC in 2001. Ami is only thirteen years old, but appears to have a crush on Archie.
- The Veronicas: When Australian twins Jess and Lisa Origliasso became a pop duo called The Veronicas (after a line from the movie Heathers) in real life, a lawsuit from Archie Comics followed. It was soon settled, and, as a promotion for both parties, Jess and Lisa appeared in some stories in the 2000s, often alongside either Veronica or The Archies band.

==== Early 2010s ====
- Antoinette "Toni" Topaz: A girl appearing in the Jughead stories. Toni has pink hair and wears hoop earrings. Nicknamed "Two-Fisted Toni", she debuted in Jughead Double Digest #176 as one of Jughead's opponents in a cupcake eating contest.
  - Vanessa Morgan portrays Antoinette "Toni" Topaz in Riverdale. In this version, Toni is initially introduced as a love interest for her fellow Southside Serpent, Jughead Jones, but enters into a relationship with Cheryl Blossom instead.
- Trevor "Trev" Brown: First appeared in Archie #631 (May 2012), is the African-American younger brother of Valerie Brown, who is a member of the Pussycats. He serves as a romantic love interest for Betty Cooper.
  - Adain Bradley portrays Trev Brown in Riverdale.
- The Riverdale Gang: A group of friendly vampires who appear in Betty and Veronica #261-262.
- The Lucificius Gang: A group of evil vampires who appear in Betty and Veronica #261-#262.
- Dr. Maddy: A mad scientist evil vampire who appears in Betty and Veronica #261-262.
- The Evil Vampire Clones: Evil vampire clones of Riverdale citizens Nancy Woods, Chuck Clayton, Reggie Mantle, and Moose Mason, created by Damien and Dr. Maddy, and led by Veronica Lodge's clone Vampironica. They appear in Betty and Veronica #261-262.

=== Other characters ===
==== Riverdale townspeople ====
- Dr. Sara Bellum: Sara is an attractive young psychiatrist who counseled Jughead and eventually wrote a self-help book that was based on her sessions with him. She appeared during Jughead's "new look" period in the early 1990s when he was a skateboarder.
- Mayor Glibb: The mayor of Riverdale for a time. Apparently from Texas, Glibb always spoke grandiosely and wore a ten-gallon hat. He seemed to be more interested in publicity and fame than governing Riverdale properly.
- Mr. Pansky: Mr. Pansky owns a costume shop in Riverdale. Most of the gang goes to his store whenever they need an outfit for a themed party. In some stories, Mr. Pansky has hired Archie, Jughead, or Reggie.
- Samm: A thin, bespectacled man who often appeared in crowd scenes, or on posters (most of which read "Vote for Samm"). He was a self-portrait of his creator, Samm Schwartz. He was also a good friend of Jughead Jones.
- Segarini: A pizza parlor owner and Pop Tate's biggest rival. However, while Jughead enjoys the food of both, he and the gang stay loyal to Pop, and the Chocklit Shoppe remains their hangout.
- Lydia Wyndham: Betty's elderly neighbor. They first met when Betty discovered a love letter between her and the man she loved, and tracked her down. Betty also found out that Lydia's lover, a World War I soldier, died in battle. Betty often asked her for advice and did favors for her. Lydia is passionate about her writing, which is one reason Betty looked up to her. Unfortunately, Lydia died (something rare for an Archie character). Betty inherited Lydia's diaries and everything else she had written.

==== Other adults ====
- Betty's Auto Racing Rivals: In 2006, Betty began racing cars for Mr. Lodge. Mr. Lodge had been the sponsor to driver Dale Jonas, but Dale had been bribed to join Mr. Lodge's rival C. C. Carp's outfit. Betty became the new Lodge auto racer. A frequent theme mentioned is the sexism in auto racing. This was why Betty took a co-ed pit crew (Archie, Veronica, Jughead, Reggie, Chuck and Nancy). Besides the arrogant Dale Jonas, Betty had a friendly rival named Marty "Speedy" Spencer. C. C. Carp later replaced Dale with a female driver C. B. (Carla Bonita) Quick.
- General Pickens: An army general from the American Civil War who served on a battlefield, part of which is now Riverdale. He only appears in references to the local history. The park in Riverdale is named Pickens Park in his honor. In one "Jughead's Time Police" story, it is revealed that in the future, Jughead will clone himself, and the clone (who is an old man by the time we meet him) only comes out of hibernation when needed. He went with Jughead and January McAndrews to the Civil War and became a hero under the alias Pickens. The army assumed Pickens dead, but he simply returned to his own time and went back in hibernation. Oddly, in this story, he is a colonel. However, he was promised a promotion if he succeeded, and may have received a posthumous promotion.
- Dr. Soonpoon: Dr. Soonpoon is an importer/exporter who possesses mystical powers like time travel, and has appeared in at least two issues. He is shown wearing a turban.
- Ms. Stonewall: The head counselor at a girl's summer camp where Betty and Veronica occasionally worked in the 1980s. In her job, Ms. Stonewall dressed in Native American attire, and may have been the first recurring Native American in Archie Comics. One of her campers was a girl named Tessie.
- O. O. Wellenmellen and Bruce Baby: A rotund, pompous movie director, Wellenmellen is known for filming spectacular, if patently ridiculous, art films. His catchphrase is "Nobody but nobody says 'no' to O. O. Wellenmellen!" Bruce Baby is his overeager, effeminate, sandal-clad assistant. They mainly appeared in the early stories.

==== Children ====
- The Feebly Twins: Identical twin brothers Glenn and Benn Feebly who played the bass fiddle (it took both little guys to do it). They occasionally appeared in the 1980s, but never had any character development, and faded from view.
- Tessie McGuire: A girl with short red hair and glasses who sometimes attended the summer camp where Betty and Veronica worked as counsellors. Originally a troublemaker at camp, she was known as Terrible Tessie, but the girls helped turn her around, and she became a lot nicer. She looked up to Betty and Veronica. Ms. Stonewall was her head counselor.

==== Nonhumans ====
- Jingles: A magical elf in the employ of Santa Claus, who often shows up in Riverdale during the Christmas season. While Jingles can be a bit clumsy and hot-tempered, he often manages to use his magical powers to create a happy ending. Adults cannot see Jingles, and it is implied that Archie and the gang's interactions with Jingles will someday come to an end.
- Sugarplum: A sugarplum fairy who appears at Christmas time to help spread Christmas cheer. She thus has a similar role to Jingles (see above); however, while Jingles is a friend to all of the main teenagers, Sugarplum mainly interacts with Betty and Veronica.

=== Spin-offs ===
==== "Dynamic New Look" series ====
- Sandy Sanchez: A straight-A student and star athlete at Riverdale High. She is determined to earn college scholarships, so she chooses not to date while in high school. In Sandy's introductory story ("The Matchmakers" in Jughead's Double Digest #139-142), Betty and Veronica conspired to bring Jughead and Sandy together as a couple. However, the gang was appalled when Jughead and Sandy apparently fall so deeply in love that Jughead gives up food, his crown hat and even the nickname "Jughead", while Sandy let her grades slip and quit the school team. In the end, it turned out that they had only been pretend to be in love to teach the others a lesson about setting people up. However, at the very end of the story, there is some inconclusive evidence that Sandy and Jughead may be occasionally dating in secret. Sandy later appeared in other "Dynamic New Look" miniseries.
- Nick St. Clair: A teenaged delinquent introduced for the four-part “Bad Boy Trouble” (Betty & Veronica Double Digest #151-154) who moved to town to live with his aunt and uncle. After sneaking into a movie, he and Veronica fell in love. Betty and Midge tried hopelessly to convince her that dating him was a bad idea. Mr. Lodge forbade it, but Veronica secretly disobeyed. Nick also tried to hit on Betty, but she wanted nothing to do with him. He would pick on others, break rules and act tougher than he really was. His catchphrase was "A saint I ain't." Betty decided that the only way to make Veronica see the truth was to go on a date with Nick. This caused Veronica to break off with both of them. The gang confronted Nick together, and the next day, Nick is not seen, as he has been sent to a military school. Veronica learned why Betty went out with Nick, and forgave her immediately. Nick later appeared in Tales of Riverdale #24 and Betty & Veronica #237.
- Eddie and Freddie Turner: Identical twins who appear as background characters in Moose and Midge: Breakup Blues.
- Judy Johnson: A romantic rival for Midge Klump, who appears in Moose and Midge: Breakup Blues, when she breaks up with Moose Mason and he starts dating Judy Johnson. She comes off as popular and sociable, mainly with the boys, but Betty and Veronica don't seem to take too kindly to her, nor does Midge, since she seems to drive a wedge between them and the boys.
- Rocco: Student from Southside High School, also appearing in Moose and Midge: Breakup Blues. Part of the conflict between Moose and Midge stems from Rocco's staring at Midge while she and Moose are at Pop Tate's. He also goes after Archie for his clumsiness both at Pop Tate's and later at the Teen Machine Dance Club. His tough, bullying, nasty side shows at the dance contest when he confronts and throws Reggie in an attempt to get Midge to dance with him, then going after Archie when he confronts him.
- Diss Dress: A rock band appearing at the end of Moose and Midge: Breakup Blues. They are the live band playing at the Teen Machine Dance Club.

==== Little Archie ====
- Mad Doctor Doom & Chester: Not to be confused with Marvel Comics' Doctor Doom, Mad Doctor Doom is a green-skinned mad scientist who has terrorized Archie and the gang since they were children, as they constantly foiled his plans of gaining great wealth and conquering the world. Doom was assisted by Chester, his nitwitted, teenaged slacker of an assistant (occasionally said to be his nephew). Chester looks and acts like a stereotypical 1950s juvenile delinquent. They both made at least one appearance in the mainstream comics.
- Evelyn Evernever: A young girl who was acquainted with Archie and friends when they were young. Evelyn was a shy girl with a bit of an inferiority complex, with tenuous relations to the rest of the gang. Her only real friend was her doll, Minerva. Evelyn Evernever likes to think of herself as a "bou'tiful" gal. After a long hiatus Evelyn Evernever reappears as a teenage girl who kidnapped Archie in a recent all-out action issue of Betty & Veronica Spectacular. It was shown in a recent issue of Veronica that Evelyn was Archie's first kiss.
- Bubbles McBounce: Bubbles McBounce was an obese girl from Little Archie. Being heavier than the other kids, she is known for such moments as the time she saved the day by holding down an air balloon that risked taking Archie and the gang on a magical voyage.
- Penny Peabody: Fangs Fogarty's girlfriend. Their relationship is exactly like Moose and Midge's: Fangs will hurt any boy who even talks to Penny.
- The Perilous Pike: A pike that lives in Logger's Pond, a large pond near Riverdale. No one has ever caught the Perilous Pike, though some people have almost caught him. In some stories, attempts to fish for him cause the Pike to attack a member of Archie's gang.
- The Southside Serpents: A gang of kids who were the rivals of Little Archie's gang and lived in the southern district of Riverdale. They filled the role of Central High Students when a rival group was needed.
- Sue Stringly: Sue was a poor little girl who knew Archie and the gang when they were young. Sue's family didn't have much money, and they lived in a shack near the railway tracks. Despite this, Sue was an upbeat, cheerful girl who never complained or despaired over her predicament. While most of the school students didn't want anything to do with her, eventually Sue became good friends with Little Archie and Veronica. Her father was sometimes said to be working in a pickle plant. Sue also lived next to a coal mine. In one story, she was called a cousin of Veronica Lodge. Although her hair is blonde, she bears a resemblance to Big Ethel. After a long hiatus right after Evelyn Evernever returns, Sue Stringly reappears as a teenage secret agent who rescues Archie and befriends Betty and Veronica (Agent B & Agent V) in a recent issue of Betty & Veronica Digest. She also appears as a teenager when she tries to get a date with Reggie. He, thinking of the skinny girl from his childhood, fakes sickness. Archie, the kind teen he is, takes Reggie's place with his childhood friend. Little do they know, Sue has grown into an attractive women who they both swoon over.
- Little Ambrose: A shy boy that Little Archie and his gang would tease.

==== Alternate universes ====
- Amani: She is Eugene's girlfriend, and only appeared in The New Archies. She bears some resemblance to Nancy. She is a close friend of Betty and Veronica.
- Babette: The main villain in Archie's R/C Racers. She and her bungling henchmen trailed Archie and the gang on their cross-country race to cause trouble for them. She owned a company that made radio-controlled vehicles. She was apparently a madwoman because her main motive in ruining the race was that the gang chose to endorse another company instead of her own.
- C.R.U.S.H.: A parody of T.H.R.U.S.H., this evil spy organization was the main antagonist in The Man From R.I.V.E.R.D.A.L.E., a series of spy-themed stories appearing in the Life With Archie title in the mid- to late 1960s, meant to capitalize on the popularity of spy films and TV series at the time. It was never revealed what C.R.U.S.H. actually stood for. The evil agents from C.R.U.S.H. often had bizarre arsenals and abilities.
- Eugene: This character, although African-American, was really a re-imagining of Dilton. He appeared only in The New Archies when Archie and the gang were Junior High Students. As he filled the role of both Chuck and Dilton, neither of those characters appeared in the series.
- Danni Malloy: This redhaired teenaged girl appeared only in Dilton's Strange Science. She served as Dilton's best friend, love interest, and partner in their science-related adventures. Her shared last name with Jinx Malloy is probably a coincidence.
- January McAndrews: She is the 29th century descendant of Archie, and is one of the characters in the short-lived Jughead's Time Police. One of the few girls that Jughead truly loves, she is also his superior in the Time Police squad. She also appears in the 2019 reboot of the series.
- "Slimy" Sal Monella: Sal Monella was the villain of the short-lived Jughead's Diner comic book. He has been attempting domination on Dinersville with his fast food chain, but is unable to take over the independent restaurant that Jughead owns. His name is a pun on the disease salmonella.
- Lady Smitty: Full name Lady Winchester Huntington-Smythe Jones, but she goes by her nickname Lady Smitty. This rich woman appeared frequently in Veronica's Passport, serving as a foil to Veronica Lodge. Veronica often ran into her on her travels. Lady Smitty had a husband named David and a teenaged son named Jared. She also has a nephew named Archie, which looks different from and not to be confused with the other character of the same first name and also lives in France.

== Sabrina the Teenage Witch series ==
- Sabrina Spellman: A friend of Archie and the gang, she is secretly a witch who tries to balance her normal teenaged life with her witch life. She is steady with her boyfriend Harvey who, like everyone else, does not know that she is a witch. There have been several different series and incarnations.
- Hilda Spellman and Zelda Spellman: Sabrina's aunts, the sisters of her late father, and her legal guardians. Originally, Hilda was tall and thin with red hair, and Zelda was short and plump with green hair. They were made more attractive in a revival of the comics. Hilda tends to be strict and short-tempered and finds Harvey annoying, but really only wants what is best for Sabrina. Zelda is calm, flexible and easy-going compared to her sister.
- Salem Saberhagen: The Spellmans' talking cat. He is really a witch that the Witches' Council turned into a cat as punishment. He has a sarcastic, somewhat self-centered attitude, but he and the Spellmans care for each other greatly.
- Harvey Kinkle: Sabrina's boyfriend in all versions of the comics. He first appears in Archie's TV Laugh-Out #1, as does Cousin Ambrose. Hilda has a low opinion of him, although she would never try to break them up. He is fairly naïve and does not know that Sabrina is a witch, despite the fact that strange things seem to happen around her. While this makes their relationship awkward, they remain as close as ever.
- Miss Della the Head Witch: The witch who is the boss, and would drop in occasionally to check up on their evil deeds.
- Cousin Ambrose: Cousin Ambrose is a male witch that always tries to give advice to Sabrina. He also tries to find love, but fails.

== Josie and the Pussycats series ==
- Josie McCoy (originally Josie Jones) is the main character of the series and leader and songwriter of the titular music group. She plays guitar and sings in the band. She is a sweet, level headed, red-haired girl and often the stable center in the chaotic antics that her friends get into.
- Melody Valentine, the group's drummer, is a stereotypical dumb blonde: naïve, absent-minded, carefree, and often misusing language. She serves as the series's comic relief, and her overwhelming sex appeal invariably drives boys crazy.
- Valerie Brown is the African-American bassist of the Pussycats. She is a scientific and mechanical genius and usually presents the solution to a problem. Somewhat of a tomboy, she will readily stand up for what she believes in.
- Alexander "Alex" Cabot III is the rich, snobby, and not very dependable manager for the band. He often comes up with schemes that are supposed to benefit him, but they always seem to fail. He is infatuated with Josie, but never manages to win her over.
- Alexandra Cabot, Alex's twin sister, is also the series's evillest character and indeed its main villain. She wants to take over the band, but has no talent of her own. She is conniving, hateful, and completely selfish, and wants to steal Alan M. from Josie. She also has a cat named Sebastian with a similar personality.
- Alan M. Mayberry is Josie's blond, muscular, good-hearted boyfriend. Originally a folk singer in his own right, he became the Pussycats's primary road crew captain after the group formed. Alex constantly makes fun of him, while Alexandra keeps trying to date him. However, he and Josie remain devoted only to each other.
- Pepper Smith was Josie's original best friend and the third member of the lead trio. Sarcastic and level-headed, she regularly dated dumb jock Socrates. She was essentially replaced by Valerie with the "Pussycats" revamp.
- Albert was Josie's original steady boyfriend and rival of Alexander.

== Cheryl Blossom series ==
- Cheryl Blossom: A redheaded third love interest for Archie who is sometimes a friend of Betty and sometimes a common enemy to Betty and Veronica. Originally introduced as a vain and arrogant member of a rich yuppie family, she was later given her own series.
- Jason Blossom: Cheryl Blossom's arrogant older twin brother. Jason lives with his family in Pembrooke, the "rich" side of Riverdale, and refers to those who live on the other side as "Townies". He most often appeared during the 1990s, when the Cheryl Blossom series was published. During that time, the Blossom twins attended Pembrooke High, a private school for rich students. Despite Jason's views, he is mainly attracted to Betty Cooper rather than Veronica Lodge.
- Clifford and Penelope Blossom: Cheryl and Jason's parents. The Blossom family is well-off due to the fortune that Clifford made as a software designer. He and Penelope are generally not pleased about their children's arrogance and want them to learn a little humility.
- Sugar Blossom: Cheryl's beloved Pomeranian dog.

== That Wilkin Boy series ==
- Bingo Wilkin: Jughead Jones's cousin. A rambunctious teenaged boy who is as clumsy as Archie Andrews and leads his eponymous band, the Bingoes. However, unlike Archie, Bingo remains loyal to only one girl, Samantha Smythe.
- Samantha Smythe: Bingo's next-door neighbor and girlfriend. She is physically very strong, despite her appearance, which sometimes makes Bingo feel inferior. However, they remain a steady couple. She performs vocals and percussion for the Bingos.
- Samson Smythe: Samantha's tough, militant-minded father who enjoys lifting weights and building up his physical strength. He is stern, temperamental and suspicious, thinks poorly of his neighbors the Wilkins, and does not want his daughter dating Bingo.
- Uncle Herman: Bingo and Jughead's eccentric uncle who lives with Bingo. A retired professional baseball player and aspiring inventor, his antics tend to annoy most of the main characters. Nevertheless, his friends and family love him very much.
- Tough Teddy Tambourine: Bingo's taller, physically stronger rival who plays bass guitar in the Bingoes. He is arrogant, enjoys showing off his taste in fashion, and is constantly trying to get between Bingo and Samantha, but never succeeds.
- Buddy Drumhead: Bingo and Teddy's soft-spoken friend who plays drums in the Bingoes and likes to ride his motorbike. More or less content with his lot in life, he prefers not to get involved with his friends' relationship problems. He has been shown to drum on almost everything in sight, and will lose his mind if he does not.
- Rebel: Bingo's dog who is capable of conscious thought. He and Teddy have a mutual hate relationship. Rebel tries to play Cupid between Bingo and Samantha and is often the one who thwarts Teddy's schemes.

== Li'l Jinx series ==
- Li'l Jinx Holliday: A mischievous little girl who was born on Halloween. She is playful, imaginative and has many close friends. Her stories are usually more plausible to happen to elementary school age children than those of Little Archie.
- Hap and Merry Holliday: Li'l Jinx's parents. Like many parents, her father Hap is constantly bothered by his daughter's antics, but this does not change how much he loves her. While he is a major character, Jinx's mother Merry almost never appears in the comics.
- Li'l Jinx's friends: Other children appearing in the series, including the rich, somewhat snobby Gigi (originally named Gaga); Jinx's apparent childhood boyfriend Greg, the large, food-loving bully Charley Hawse; a boy with an inferiority complex named Mort; Jinx's best friend Roz, a talented artist appearing in later years; and Roz's scientifically knowledgeable brother Ross.

== Katy Keene series ==
- Katy Keene: A glamorous fashion model and movie actress. Twenty-one years old, she lives with her redheaded adolescent sister "Sis", apparently as her legal guardian. She has had a number of recurring boyfriends over the years. The focus of her stories alternates between her modeling career and her love life.
- "Sis" Keene: Katy's redheaded younger sister. Originally an elementary school student, but later portrayed as the same age as Archie and the gang. Her first name, depending on the incarnation, is Melissa, Mackenzie or Sissy, but she is mostly just called Sis.
- Katy's friends: Katy's close friends include her fellow models Gloria Grandbilt and Lucki Lorelei. The former (called Gloria Gold in later incarnations) is her vain blonde rival for the boys' affections, while the latter is her redheaded superstitious best friend, with level headed brunette Katy Keene rounding out the group.
- Katy's boyfriends: Katy has had many recurring boyfriends over the years, including K.O. Kelly (a boxer), Randy van Ronson (K.O.'s rich rival), Ramon Ramirez (a Latino airline pilot and talented dancer), Arnold Horsenlegger (an Austrian muscleman/movie star obviously modeled on Arnold Schwarzenegger), and Click Lenz (the girls' fashion photographer).

== Archie's Mad House ==
- Captain Sprocket: A bungling but victorious superhero who appeared for many issues. For a time, he was the closest thing the series had to a main character; most of the stories featured one-time character.
- Clyde Didit: A hippie/musician who served as a mascot for a while until he and his friends took over the series. At this point, he was the drummer and leader of a band called the Madhouse Glads.
- Clyde's gang: Clyde has three brothers, Dan, Dick and Dippy, who each play a guitar (Dan has bass guitar, Dick has lead guitar, and Dippy has rhythm guitar) in the Madhouse Glads. Dick is also Clyde's best friend. Fran the Fan is their obsessed groupie, and the fashion-obsessed Rod the Mod competes with Clyde for her affections.

== Wilbur series ==
- Wilbur Wilkin: Despite debuting three months before Archie, this self-absorbed blond teenager is typically called an Archie clone. Wilbur has more of a tendency to play dirty to get what he wants than the more well-meaning Archie, and did not share Archie's popularity.
- Laurie Lake: Wilbur's steady sweet, blonde and beautiful girlfriend. Typically a sensible girl, but can be somewhat ditzy. She is comparable to Betty Cooper, although Wilbur prefers her to her rich arrogant rival, unlike Archie and his girlfriends.
- Linda Moore: A sassy, well-off brunette girl with a bit of a mean streak. She adores Wilbur and constantly schemes to get between him and Laurie. When displeased, she will not hesitate to make this known. Laurie and Linda resemble Betty and Veronica with the roles reversed.
- Red: Wilbur's best friend and confidante, with a personality to match Jughead. Marked by his glasses and red hair, he is content to watch the dating scene from the sidelines. Near the end of the series run, he was re-imagined into the shorter, fatter Sheldon.
- Slats: The role of Wilbur's rival has varied over the years (Lester, Alec, Bolo), but most of the time, Slats filled the role. Slats is a low-down, devious schemer who is constantly trying to pull pranks on Wilbur or take the girls from him.

== Suzie series ==
- Suzie: A cheerful, but completely ditzy blonde teenager with clumsiness to match Archie's. Unlike Archie, she is fresh out of high school, but due to her ineptness, she cannot keep a job. Boys flock to her beauty, but lose interest when they learn the trouble she unintentionally causes.
- Ferdie: Suzie's redheaded, dorky slacker for a boyfriend and closest confidante. When Suzie is at risk to do more harm than good, Ferdie is usually stuck trying to keep things under control. No matter what happens to Suzie, Ferdie is always someone she can count on.
- Angela the Angel: Suzie's small adolescent niece who acts like an angel, but is really a mischievous schemer working against Suzie and her friends, and is generally considered to be a nuisance.
- Gregory von Dripp: A rich and vain young man who does anything he can to charm women over. He is very attracted to Suzie and with her perpetual optimism, she cannot see through him. Ferdie is the one who must help her to see the light.

== Ginger series ==
- Ginger Snapp: Yet another mischievous, fun-loving teenager who was an attempt to recapture Archie's success. Ginger falls for the opposite sex easily, although her tastes are much broader than Archie, and she even tends to fall for her male teachers. Her parents' names are Fred and Lotta.
- Dottie/Dotty, later Patsy: One of Ginger's closest friends. She has dark hair, sometimes wears glasses, sometimes has freckles and sometimes her face is somewhat chubbier than most girls in Archie comics. She fills the role of the more easy-going sidekick to Ginger.
- Iccky (or Ickky): A resourceful nerd, similar to Dilton Doiley, but is more confident in regards to girls. He has a constant crush on Ginger and is pleased that a girl as beautiful as her is willing to date him. Though she often stands him up, he knows there will be other chances.
- Tommy Turner: Another of Ginger's boyfriends whom Iccky considers a rival. He is tall, blonde and a decent athlete, and portrayed as a good-natured all-American boy.

== Superheroes ==
=== The Mighty Crusaders ===
- The Black Hood (Matthew Burland): A former police officer who is magically compelled to do good and fight for justice whenever he wears his hood, as well as gaining enhanced physical abilities.
- The Comet (Jack Dickering): A scientist who gains the power to fly and shoot disintegrating beams from his eyes after injecting himself with a gas lighter than hydrogen. In Pep Comics #17, the Comet became the first superhero to die in the line of duty. He is avenged by his brother Bob, who becomes the Hangman.
- The Fly (Tommy Troy): A boy who, with a magic ring, switches bodies with one of the few surviving Fly People from another dimension. He has all the powers of the insect kingdom, including, flight, superhuman strength and insect telepathy.
- Flygirl (Kim Brand): An actress that the Fly rescued. She quickly received similar powers from the same source and became his partner in fighting crime. She is one of MLJ Comics' very few superheroines.
- The Shield (Joe Higgins): An American Flag-themed superhero. His powers, derived from x-rays and a chemical, are all enhanced physical abilities. Other individuals would later assume Higgins' former superhero identity.
- Darkling (Darla Lang): A serious woman who is distant and secretive, but became friends with Flygirl. She uses her cloak as a weapon, trapping and teleporting her opponents with it. She is one of MLJ Comics' very few superheroines.
- The Jaguar (Ralph Hardy): A zoologist who found a magic belt in an ancient temple that gave him flight, strength, animal control and the enhanced abilities of many animals.
- The Web (John Raymond): A criminology professor who used a technologically advanced suit to have flight, enhanced strength, a GPS tracker and bulletproof armor.
- Pureheart the Powerful* : A character seen occasionally in comics as Archie in superhero form, starting with Life With Archie #42. He saves Betty and Veronica from peril from *Evilheart the Mighty*. This is Reggie but in supervillain form. He kidnaps Betty and Veronica in trying to cause Archie trouble. He usually fails in his plans.

=== Other superheroes ===
- Captain Flag (Tom Townsend): A wealthy playboy who, after his father was murdered, was carried away by an eagle (later his sidekick Yank) to a mountain top where his new life made him physically superior.
- The Wizard (Blane Whitney): An intelligent man who used various technologies to fight crime. He eventually displayed psychic powers. He had a sidekick, Roy the Super Boy, who was trained to be super-strong.
- Steel Sterling was the alter ego of John Sterling, who, after his father's fortune was swindled by criminals, plunged his body into a cauldron of molten metal, giving him the powers of super-strength, ferrokinesis (the psychic generation and manipulation of magnetic currents), invulnerability and flight. Steel Sterling's nemeses included the Black Knight and Baron Gestapo (a World War II-era foe, as his name indicates), as well as Twisto, the Puppet Master, the Rattler, and the Hyena. He first appeared in Zip Comics #1 (Feb. 1940), and was created by writer Abner Sundell and artist Charles Biro. Steel Sterling, the Jaguar and Mr. Justice also teamed up as the Terrific Three.
- Mr. Justice, also known as “the Royal Wraith,” was the superhero moniker of Prince James of England, who was murdered by rebels in the 18th century. His spirit remained trapped in the castle where the murder took place until 1940. The dismantled castle was to be shipped to the United States until a Nazi submarine sunk the ship on which it was carried, thereby releasing the spirit of Prince James. He assumed corporeal form as “Mr. Justice,” and his main nemesis was Satan himself. He first appeared in Blue Ribbon Comics #9 (Feb. 1941), and was created by writer Joe Blair and artist Sam Cooper.
- The Fox (Paul Patten): A young reporter and photographer who mainly took to dealing with crime to further his career. Like many other MLJ Comics superheroes, he technically has no superpowers.
- Inferno (Frank Verrano): A fire breather who was originally a circus-performing bad boy, but started using his power to fight crime. His fire was hot enough to burn through or melt solid metal instantly.
- The Firefly (Harley Hudson): An entomologist who taught himself to coordinate his muscles like an insect so that he can lift great amounts of weight.
- Bob Phantom (Walter Whitney): A Broadway theater columnist with strength, invulnerability, and the ability to teleport. The character debuted in Blue Ribbon Comics #2 (December 1939) in a story written by Harry Shorten and illustrated by Irv Novick before making other appearances in issues of Top Notch Comics published from 1940 to 1942. The character was briefly revived in the 1964 comic Mighty Crusaders.
- Thunder Bunny (Bobby Caswell): A boy who received the power to turn into an anthropomorphized rabbit with flight and superhuman strength when he touched a box containing the spirit of the last member of an alien race.
- The Hangman (Robert Dickering): The Comet's brother who became the Hangman to avenge the Comet after he was killed. He relies on his natural physical and mental abilities.
- The Scarlet Avenger (Jim Kendall): A scientist who began fighting crime after his family died in a plane crash of which he was the only survivor. He uses advanced technology and weaponry.
- The Red Rube (Reuben Reuben): A redheaded runaway from a cruel orphanage turned cub reporter for the Daily Sun who drank a magic elixir that allows him access to the abilities of his ancestors whenever he says the phrase, "Hey, Rube!" Transformed into a bare-chested, red cape and trousers-clad adult superhero, he has enhanced physical abilities of strength, speed and invulnerability.
- Fireball (Ted Tyler): A fireman who was attacked by an arsonist then doused in a mix of chemicals, that gave him the power to absorb heat and control flames.

== Other series ==
- Cosmo the Merry Martian: The first Martian to visit Earth, sent out to explore the planet. Accompanying him was his smaller, less-learned traveling companion Orbi. Their adventures only lasted six issues, each ending with a cliffhanger.
- Super Duck: A duck who parodies Superman. Joined by his bratty nephew Fauntleroy and temperamental girlfriend Uwanna, Super Duck (nicknamed Supe) typically ended up in hapless situations instead of saving the day.
- Pat Smith: The star of Pat the Brat and a sarcastic, mischievous little boy. He was much smarter than other kids his age, but used those smarts to make trouble. He was not above outright taking advantage of people, including his own parents Oswald and Alice.
- Pipsqueak: Another troublemaking child starring in The Adventures of Pipsqueak. His parents were often his victims. Unlike most Archie titles, Pipsqueak's art style resembles that of a daily newspaper strip, which was the main feature that distinguished it from Pat the Brat.
- Seymour: A boy who starred in the one-offs My Son The Teenager and More Seymour. Like so many other Archie-like characters, Seymour is girl-crazy and causes havoc unintentionally. In this case, the catastrophic results of Seymour's clumsiness usually come at the expense of his beleaguered, white-haired father, who is simply referred to as "Poppa". In the one-off My Son The Teenager, the narrative is a poem written by the father entitled "A Father's Lament". The poem itself paints Seymour as a very loving and angelic boy, while the cartoon shows the complete opposite. Seymour is not only clumsy and causes havoc unintentionally, but is also a lazy, girl-crazy, class clown sort of boy. The one-off More Seymour is a two-part story. In the first part, Seymour's father tries to keep him from spending the day at the beach by giving him a long laundry list of household chores to do before he goes to enjoy the sun. However, after screwing up literally every chore assigned, Seymour's father finally relents and begs him to go to the beach. In the second part, Seymour is at the beach with his blonde girlfriend and bubble gum chewing best friend. Seymour's time at the beach is short-lived, however, as his clumsiness draws the wrath of literally everyone else that is there. These people end up forming an angry mob who chase him off the beach. This overused formula may have hindered Seymour from appearing in more issues.
