= Hangman Comics =

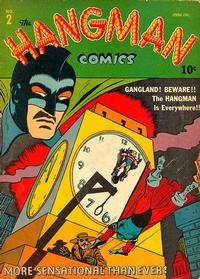
- Cover of Hangman Comics 2 (Spring 1942), art by Harry Lucey

Publication information
- Publisher: MLJ Magazines Inc
- Schedule: Quarterly
- Format: Ongoing series
- Publication date: Spring 1942 – Fall 1943
- No. of issues: 7
- Main character: Hangman

Creative team
- Written by: Various
- Artist: Various

Hangman Comics is the name of an American anthology comic book series published by MLJ Magazines Inc., more commonly known as MLJ Comics, for seven issues between Spring 1942 and Fall 1943. It featured MLJs costumed vigilante The Hangman, and "Boy Buddies", featuring Shield's partner 'Dusty the Boy Detective' and Wizard's side-kick 'Roy the Superboy', throughout the series.

== Publication history ==
Hangman Comics was published by MLJ Magazines Inc., the precursor to what would become the publisher Archie Comics. The title started with issue #2 (Spring 1942), a 68-page comics following directly on from Special Comics #1, which also featured the same characters. The series was edited by Harry Shorten.

The feature character throughout the series was the titular Hangman, a masked superhero who first appeared in Pep Comics #17 (July 1941) and continued to appear there in his own feature during and after Hangman Comics' run. He appeared in three stories in each issue, each usually subtitled 'Special Case Number xx' , and there was a Hangman text story in most issues, something all comic books did through the early 1960s, to satisfy U.S. Postal Service requirements for magazine rates. The Hangman stories were drawn by a number of artists, including Paul Reinman, Bob Fujitani, Harry Lucey (who also drew the covers for issues #2-5) and Irv Novick.

There were also two supporting stories in each issue starring "Boy Buddies", the Shield's partner 'Dusty the Boy Detective' and the Wizard's side-kick 'Roy the Superboy' in a dual adventure - the first regular costumed hero 'sidekick' team-up in comics. Most of the "Boy Buddies" stories were written by Bill Woolfolk, with art by either Paul Reinman or Bill Vogoda.

Starting with issue #3 (Summer 1942), each issue also contained a "Boy Buddies Junior Flying Corps" club page, following on from a request for members in the final panel of the second "Boy Buddies" story in issue #2 (Spring 1942). Issue #6 (Spring 1943) replaced the Junior Flying Corps page with plans for a 'Silent Birdman' glider, while in the first 60-page issue, #7 (Summer 1943), the Junior Flying Corps page increased to two pages to accommodate plans for building a 'duplex glider' as well as the new members list, while the following issue, #8 (Fall 1943) had plans for building a 'Fleetwing' competition glider. A number of single-page 'True facts' articles or puzzle pages also appeared in most issues, although #6 (Spring 1943) contained a 6-page strip by Paul Reinman, "Hangman's Hall of Shame" about Hermann Göring.

From issue #9 Hangman Comics was retitled Black Hood Comics. The Hangman continued to appear in Pep Comics, "Boy Buddies" continuing in the first three issues of "Black Hood Comics".

== External sources ==
- "Boy Buddies" at Don Markstein's Toonopedia
