= Jughead's Double Digest =

- Jughead's Double Digest Magazine #116 Oct. 2005

Publication information
- Publisher: Archie Comics
- Schedule: Eleven times a year
- Publication date: October 1989- April 2014
- No. of issues: 200

Creative team
- Artist(s): Dan DeCarlo, Stan Goldberg, Bob Smith, others

Jughead's Double Digest is an American comic digest magazine published by Archie Comics. It began as a companion publication to the Jughead 32-page comic book and Jughead With Archie Digest magazine.

== Publication history ==
The Double Digest series are larger versions of the Archie Digest publication line. The regular Digests were 128 pages (later 96), while the Double Digests were 256 pages (later 192), hence the name Double Digest. Jughead's Double Digest Magazine began publication in October 1989 on a quarterly basis, but was later published eleven times a year and featured several new Jughead stories along with the reprints. Jughead's Double Digest Magazine was the last monthly Jughead solo title as the 32-page Jughead comic (1949-2012), Jughead With Archie Digest (1974-2005), The Jughead Jones Digest (1977-1996) and Jughead & Friends Digest (2005-2010) have all been cancelled. The title was replaced in 2014 with the new Jughead and Archie Double Digest series, reprinting Jughead and Archie stories along with new ones.

Issue #138 reprinted the entire first issue of Archie's Pal Jughead Comics from 1949.

Issue #176 (2012) featured the first appearance of Toni Topaz, a tough girl with pink hair who wears a purple jumpsuit. She appears as a rival to Jughead in the cupcake-eating contest.

Issues #196 and 200 were 'Double Double' Digests with 320 pages.

== "New look" series ==
From April to August 2008, a four-part story entitled "The Matchmakers" ran in issues 139 to 142 of Jughead's Double Digest. It was the second in a line of "new look" stories released by Archie Comics. It was published following the success of Betty & Veronica Double Digest's "new look" story called "Bad Boy Trouble" which was released in 2007.

"The Matchmakers" uses the same character designs from "Bad Boy Trouble" and the plot follows Jughead as he is 'set up' with a girl, Sandy Sanchez. The story was based on a novel that came out in 1991 by Michael Pellowski and John L. Goldwater entitled It's First Love, Jughead Jones; however, Melanie J. Morgan is accredited by Archie Comics for the comic's script. The art is by Joe Staton and Al Milgrom, working from Steven Butler's character designs.
