= Harry Lucey =

- Born: November 13, 1913
- Died: August 28, 1984 (aged 70)
- Areas: Cartoonist, Penciller, Inker
- Notable works: Archie Comics; Hangman Comics

Harry Lucey (November 13, 1913 – August 28, 1984) was an American comic artist best known for his work in MLJ and Archie Comics. He was the primary artist on Archie, the company's flagship title, from the late 1950s through the mid-1970s.

== Career ==
Lucey, who graduated from the Pratt Institute in 1935, worked on both adventure and humor titles for MLJ, including acting as the regular artist on The Hangman, before being drafted into the United States Army. After being discharged, he spent several years working in advertising. In 1949, he rejoined MLJ, which by that time had changed its name to Archie Comics. Though he continued to draw action and romance comics for the company, including the hard-boiled mystery Sam Hill, Private Eye, his primary work was on their popular teen humor titles. During the 1960s and the early 1970s, Lucey drew most of the stories in the Archie title, as well as drawing stories for many of the other titles. He also drew most of the company's in-house ads, and contributed many covers to titles like Pep Comics.

Victor Gorelick reminisced:

Harry was as dedicated as they came. I remember Harry delivering a job three hours late. He came to the art department covered with blood. He had been hit by a car. Though not seriously hurt, he should have gone to a hospital. No way. He had to keep that deadline. He took some white paint, cleaned up the blood from the artwork and went home. Amazing.

In the late 1960s, Lucey's health began to deteriorate. He developed an allergy to graphite which required him to wear gloves while drawing. In 1976, he was diagnosed with amyotrophic lateral sclerosis (ALS), and abruptly retired from Archie Comics; his inker, Chic Stone, temporarily succeeded him as penciller on Archie. He died of prostate cancer and complications from ALS in 1984.

Since his death, Lucey's work has been rediscovered by younger cartoonists who celebrate his mastery of body language and physical comedy. Jaime Hernandez frequently cites Lucey as one of his biggest influences in cartooning, preferring Lucey's work to that of his more famous colleague Dan DeCarlo. "I like them both," Hernandez explained, "but Lucey just happens to be a personal favorite, because I think he was better at drawing natural characters – just their expressions taught me a lot about how I do my comics."

== Personal life ==
Lucey's wife Helen Tokar was the sister of Betty Tokar Jankovich, who briefly dated Bob Montana and was the inspiration for Betty Cooper.
