= Bad Boy Trouble =

2007 American comic book story

- Cover of Betty & Veronica in 'Bad Boy Trouble'
- Publisher: Archie Comics
- Publication date: July – October 2007
- Genre: Humor/comedy
- Title(s): Betty & Veronica Double Digest #151–154
- Main character: See: Characters

"Bad Boy Trouble" is an American comic book story by writer Melanie J. Morgan and artists Steven Butler and Al Milgrom that was originally serialized in Betty & Veronica Double Digest #151–154. The story features Betty and Veronica (and other Archie Comics characters), and is notable because of its length (at approximately 100 pages, much longer than most Archie Comics stories) and because it was the first of an occasional series of Archie Comics stories drawn in a more realistic style. Also unusual for Archie Comics, the story was collected into a trade paperback edition within a month after the original serialization was completed. The story is based on the Riverdale High novel Bad News Boyfriend.

== Plot ==
=== Part 1 ===
Betty, Veronica, and Midge go to watch a movie where they meet Nick St. Clair, a smooth-talking teenage biker nephew of the Anderson family. He had recently moved in with his aunt and uncle due to trouble at his previous high school in New Jersey. Betty and Midge are suspicious of Nick (mainly because he sneaks into the movie theater), yet Veronica is interested. When Nick learns Veronica is wealthy he convinces her to go on a ride on his motorcycle with him. They promise to be back soon, but fail to return well after the movie is over. Betty and Midge return to the Lodge Mansion to tell Mr. Lodge what happened to Veronica. Nick and Veronica return hours later, and Nick drops her off without a word. Mr. Lodge forbids Veronica from seeing Nick again even after she insists that nothing happened. She recounts the story to her friends after Mr. Lodge leaves the room. They had gone into a pizzeria where several other bikers mocked Nick and tried to hit on Veronica. Nick fights them, and one of the bikers breaks his hand when punching Nick's helmet. Midge then warns Veronica that she can't juggle Archie and Nick forever. Veronica agrees and decides to gives up Archie in order to be with Nick.

=== Part 2 ===
Midge and Betty initially hide the whole episode with Nick from Archie. When Nick is in Mr. Flutesnoot's biology class with them he decides to be disruptive by making chicken noises. When he is accused of making those noises he tells Mr. Flutesnoot that Betty will swear he didn't do it. However, Archie tells on him and Nick is sent to the principal's office. Later, Nick is thrown out of history class for talking to Veronica. When Veronica and Nick try to join Archie, Chuck, Nancy, Midge, Betty, Jughead, and Dilton at lunch only Betty, Dilton and Jughead will sit with him. Nick later flirts with Betty, who tells him she is not interested.

Nick's rude behavior continues for weeks, but Veronica chooses to ignore it. Veronica then asks Betty if she can sleep over at her house while her parents are away so she can go out with Nick, since Mr. Lodge won't let her date him. Although Betty does not think it is a good idea she eventually agrees.

=== Part 3 ===
Veronica goes on her date with Nick St. Clair where they go to a nightclub, stay out late and kiss when it is over. At school, Ms. Grundy assigns a two-thousand word essay and threatens to fail anyone who does not complete it. Nick strong arms Dilton to write the essay for him, but Archie stops him. When they are just about to fight with one another Coach Clayton arrives before it happens. After learning it's a personal matter between Nick and Archie he offers to let them fight in a boxing ring as long as they keep it secret. Archie fights well, causing Nick to fight dirty and Coach Clayton declares Archie the winner after the last round.

=== Part 4 ===
Nick tells people about the fight, but lies and claims to have won. Dilton tells the true story at Pop Tate's, and everyone congratulates him for standing up to Nick. Betty tries to tell Veronica about Nick's advances, but Veronica accuses Betty of being jealous and refuses to listen. Betty sets a trap for Nick by agreeing to see a movie with him. Archie takes Veronica to the same movie, where she sees Nick kiss Betty. Veronica breaks up with Nick and dumps Betty as a friend.

The next day, Reggie tells Archie and Betty that Nick was caught turning in an essay that Veronica wrote for him and Ms. Grundy failed him. As punishment he is sent to a military school, but is happy about it because he hopes that the discipline will straighten him out. After Nick finally realized what true friendship is about he tells Reggie to say goodbye to everyone. Nancy tells Veronica what happened and she forgives Betty.

== Later New Look Stories ==
Six more of the realistic style stories were made due to the success of Bad Boy Trouble. The next story using the more realistic character designs called The Matchmakers was serialized in Jughead's Double Digest #139-142. A third story in this vein, titled Break-up Blues was released in Archie's Pals 'n' Gals Double Digest #125-128. The fourth story called My Father's Betrayal was originally released in Betty & Veronica Double Digest #170-173 and the fifth story, Goodbye Forever, was released in Archie's Double Digest #200-203. The sixth new look story, A Funny Kind of Love, was serialized in Archie's Pals 'n' Gals Double Digest #135-138 and the final new look story called No Baseball for Betty was serialized in Betty & Veronica Double Digest #180-183.

The Matchmakers, Break-up Blues, My Father's Betrayal, and Goodbye Forever were later released in a trade paperback edition after serialization like Bad Boy Trouble. However, the last two stories, A Funny Kind of Love and No Baseball for Betty, have yet to be released in a paperback edition.
