= Hangman (Archie Comics) =

The Hangman
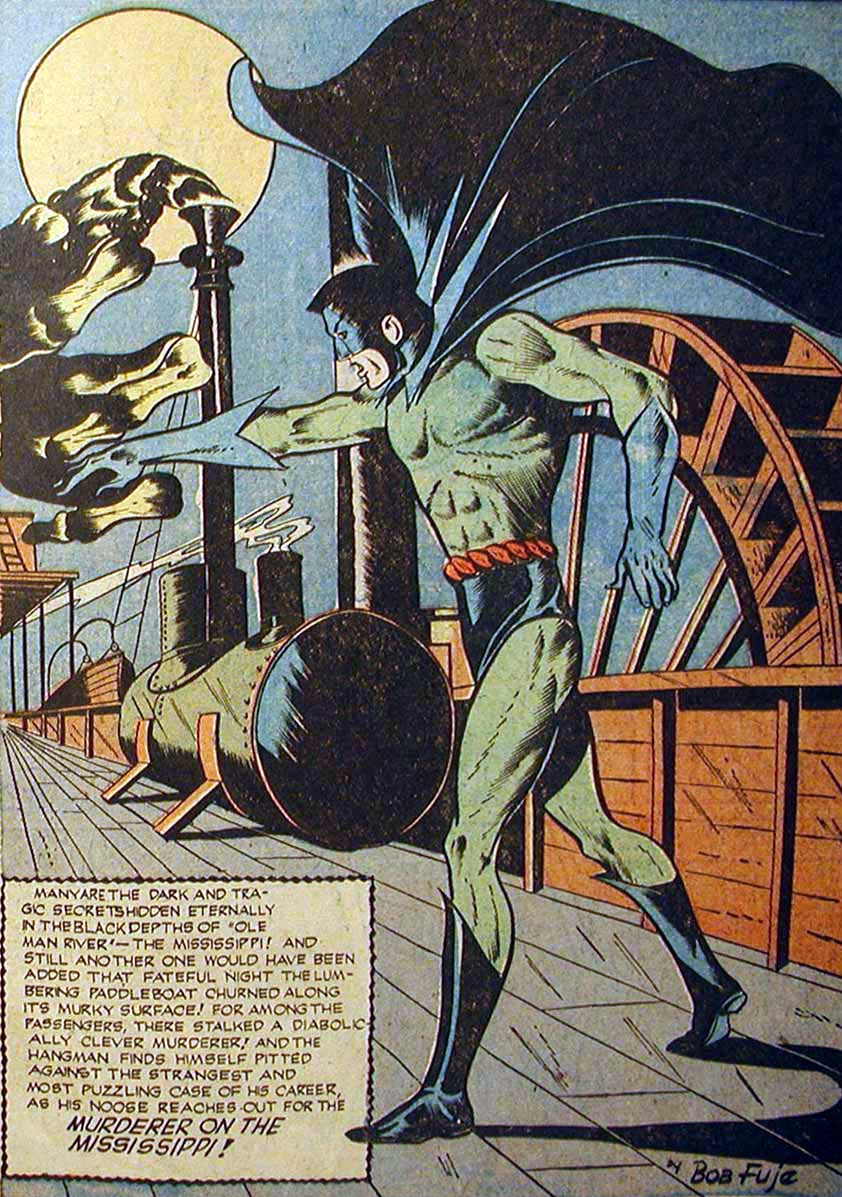
- The Hangman (Robert Dickering version)

Publication information
- Publisher: Archie Comics; Dark Circle Comics
- First appearance: Robert Dickering Pep Comics #17 (1941) Steve Dickering The Comet (vol. 1) #1 (1983) Eric Adams The Comet (vol. 2) #5 (1991) Michael Minetta The Hangman (vol. 2) #1 (2015)
- Created by: Unknown (script); Harry Lucey (art)

In-story information
- Alter ego: Robert Dickering; Steve Dickering; Eric Adams; Michael Minetta
- Team affiliations: Mighty Crusaders
- Abilities: (Archie) Skilled fighter; (Impact) Psychically linked with a raven to see, utilizes a bag of mystic charms; (DC) Rope generation and manipulation, darkness generation and manipulation, fear inducement, teleportation, immortality
Publication information
- Publisher: Archie Comics; Dark Circle Comics
- Schedule: (vol. 1) Quarterly (vol. 2) Monthly
- Format: Ongoing series
- Publication date: Spring 1942 – present
- No. of issues: (vol. 1) 7 (vol. 2) 4
Creative team
- Written by: (vol. 1) Various (vol. 2) Frank Tieri
- Artist(s): (vol. 1) Paul Reinman Bob Fujitani Harry Lucey Irv Novick (vol. 2) Felix Ruiz
- Letterer(s): (vol. 2) Rachel Deering
- Colorist(s): (vol. 2) Kelly Fitzpatrick

The Hangman is the name of several superheroes that appear in periodicals published by MLJ Comics and later Dark Circle Comics.

== Publication history ==
The first Hangman (Robert Dickering) debuted in MLJ Comics' Pep Comics #17 (January 1941). Dickering is the brother of the Comet, a superhero who had been appearing since Pep #1. The Comet is killed in issue #17, and dies in his brother's arms. Robert promises to avenge his brother's death, and takes on the mantle of the Hangman. His recurring enemies include Captain Swastika and the villainous Jackal.

The Hangman appeared in Pep Comics until the 47th issue, as well as in Special Comics #1.

In Spring 1942, Special Comics was renamed Hangman Comics starting with issue #2. It ran for seven issues, ending in fall 1943 when it was renamed Black Hood Comics.

The Hangman appeared in Fly Man #33 (September 1965) after a 21-year absence. However, this time the Hangman was a villain who fought against the Mighty Crusaders.

A new Hangman (Steve Dickering) appeared in The Comet #1 (1983), however he eventually faded into obscurity.

After DC Comics continuity altering "Final Crisis" company-wide crossover had ended, they licensed the rights to the Red Circle and Milestone Media heroes, bringing them into DC Universe continuity. The Hangman appeared as a second feature in The Web written by Angela Robinson with art by Roger Robinson. His first appearance was in The Web #1 (November 2009).

In March 2015, a new series featuring The Hangman was announced under the Dark Circle Comics imprint. The Hangman debuted in November 2015, written by Frank Tieri with art provided by Felix Ruiz. Dark Circle Comics Editor Alex Segura has described the new series as "Quentin Tarantino adapting a Stephen King novel.".

== Robert "Bob" Dickering ==
=== MLJ Comics ===
==== Fictional character biography ====
The Hangman is secretly Robert "Bob" Dickering, whose brother John Dickering is the hero the Comet. Bob Dickering becomes the Hangman after watching his brother die by the men he was trying to put behind bars. Afterwards, he promises to get revenge against all criminals and takes up the identity of the Hangman.

Whenever the Hangman is needed, Dickering changes into his costume, which consists of a green, skin-tight body suit, along with a black cowl and cape, blue gloves, and black trunks and boots; he also carries a noose. He announces his presence by using a flashlight to shine an image of gallows on the nearest wall to a criminal he's caught in the act.

Dickering fights alongside such heroes as the Shield while doing battle against villains, most notably Madam Satan.

After disappearing for some time, he returns as a criminal himself, fighting against the Mighty Crusaders. He eventually returns to the side of good.

=== DC Comics ===
Robert Dickering is a lieutenant and doctor in the United States Army during the Civil War against the Confederate States of America. During this time he was ambushed by a group of thieves and left for dead. After awakening he realizes that the thieves left him behind enemy lines. When he returns he is sentenced with the death penalty for spying behind enemy lines.

With minutes left to live, he is approached by a mysterious figure cloaked in the shadows offering him a way out of death. He told Dickering that he could survive the hanging in return for hunting down all those who don't repent for the evil deeds they have committed. He must do this forever until he is destroyed by something equal to the mysterious shadow's powers, or until the end of the world.

Dickering accepts the offer and survives the hanging. He decides to take up a secret identity creating the Hangman. For over a hundred years since his execution, he has continued to punish those guilty while helping the innocent.

=== Dark Circle Comics ===
Robert Dickering appears as the Hangman in the first issue of The Hangman (vol. 2) in November 2015. He comes for hitman Michael Minetta and proceeds to hang him. After hanging Minetta, Dickering is deemed worth of ascension.

== Steve Dickering ==
=== Archie Comics ===
==== Fictional character biography ====
The second Hangman is Steve Dickering, the son of the original Hangman who first appeared in The Comet #1 (1983). He took up the mantle of the Hangman to prove to his father that he could honor the title.

The second Hangman wore a costume similar to the original Hangman complete with carrying around a hangman's noose.

== Eric Adams ==
=== DC Comics' Impact imprint ===
The third Hangman debuted under DC Comics' Impact Comics imprint. He is secretly Eric Adams, a lawyer working for Native American rights. He is attacked because of his work leaving him blind and left for dead. A local tribal shaman found him and healed him as well as giving him a bag of magical charms and a raven whose eyes Eric could see through. With these gifts, Adams fights corruption both in the courtroom and on the streets as the Hangman.

==== Powers and abilities ====
The Hangman has no superpowers, however he uses a bag of magical charms to fight crime as well as using the eyes of a Raven to see through.

== Michael Minetta ==
=== Dark Circle Comics ===
The fourth Hangman first appeared in The Hangman (vol. 2) #1 as a loyal hitman-for-hire named Michael "Mikey Ice" Minetta. He lives in Dyker Heights, Brooklyn with his wife and daughter, Gabby. He is hired to "take care" of a man named Petey after he slept with another man's wife. On his way back for the hit he is attacked by the Hangman (Robert Dickering) who proceeds to beat up Minetta and hang him from a street lamp. Minetta awakens in hell and is met by Satan. Satan tells Minetta the story of the Hangmen and how they have been around for centuries collecting the souls of those who are deemed unworthy to remain existing. Satan offers the now open position of the Hangman after Dickering was deemed worthy of ascension. Minetta initially refuses the offer until he realizes that his wife and daughter could still be put in danger. He accepts Satan's offer and is brought back to walk the Earth as the Hangman.

== In other media ==
Michael Minetta appears in the second season of The CW series Riverdale as Sheriff Tom Keller's replacement in the investigation of Midge Klump's murder.
