= Archie Comics =

American comic book publisher

Archie Comic Publications, Inc.
- Founded: 1939; 87 years ago (as MLJ Magazines)
- Founders: Maurice Coyne; Louis Silberkleit; John L. Goldwater
- Country of origin: United States
- Headquarters location: Pelham, New York
- Key people: Nancy Silberkleit (Co-CEO); Victor Gorelick (editor-in-chief); Jon Goldwater (CEO, publisher); Roberto Aguirre-Sacasa (CCO)
- Publication types: Comic books
- Fiction genres: Romance; Superhero fiction; Horror; Crime fiction; Adventure; Comedy; Action
- Imprints: Archie Action; Archie Horror; Dark Circle Comics
- Official website: archiecomics.com

Archie Comic Publications, Inc. (often referred to simply as Archie Comics) is an American comic book publisher headquartered in the village of Pelham, New York. The company's many titles feature the fictional teenagers Archie Andrews, Jughead Jones, Betty Cooper, Veronica Lodge, Reggie Mantle, Sabrina Spellman, Josie and the Pussycats and Katy Keene. The company is also known for its long-running Sonic the Hedgehog comic series, which it published from 1992 until 2017.

The company began in 1939 as M.L.J. Magazines, Inc., which primarily published superhero comics. The initial Archie characters were created in 1941 by publisher John L. Goldwater and artist Bob Montana, in collaboration with writer Vic Bloom. They first appeared in Pep Comics #22 (cover-dated Dec. 1941). With the creation of Archie, Goldwater hoped to appeal to fans of the Andy Hardy films starring Mickey Rooney.

Archie Comics was also the title of the company's longest-running publication, the first issue appearing with a cover date of Winter 1942. Starting with issue #70, the title was shortened to simply Archie. The flagship series was relaunched from issue #1 in July 2015 with a new look and design suited for a new generation of readers, although after #32 it reverted to its historic numbering with #699. Archie Comics characters and concepts have also appeared in numerous films, television programs, cartoons, and video games.

== History ==
=== Independent era ===
==== M.L.J. Magazines ====
===== 1939–1946: early years =====
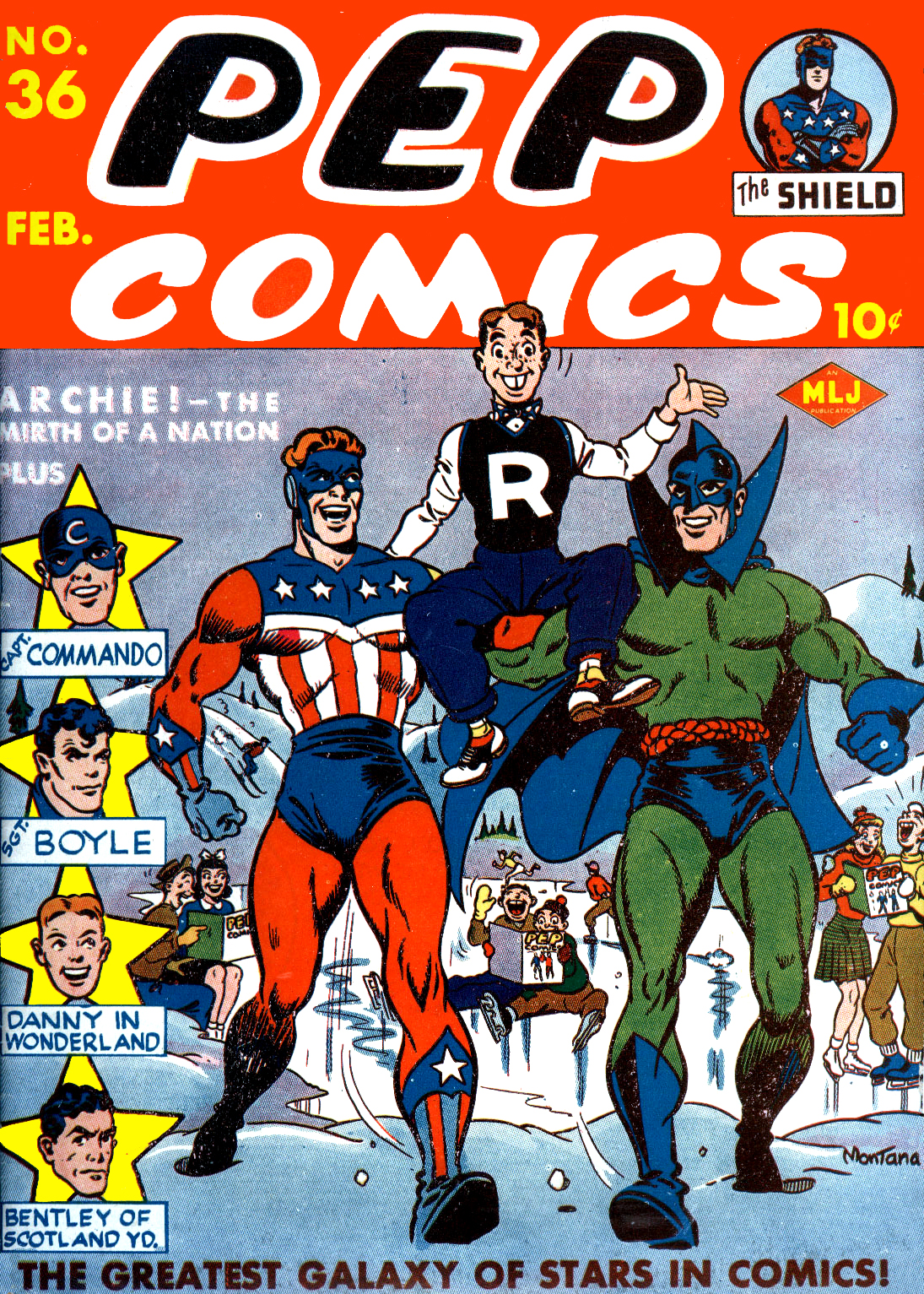
Pep Comics #36

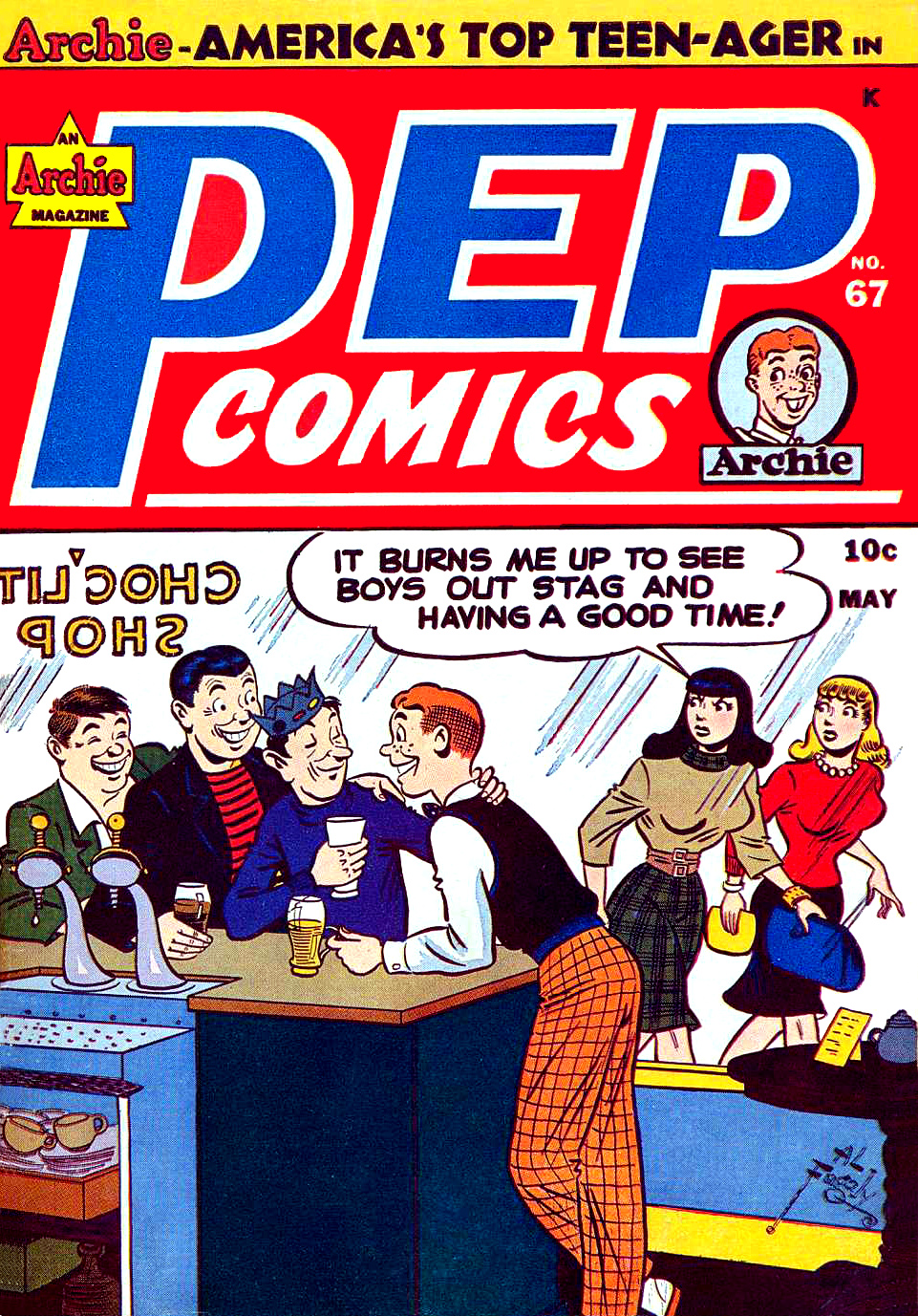
Pep Comics #67

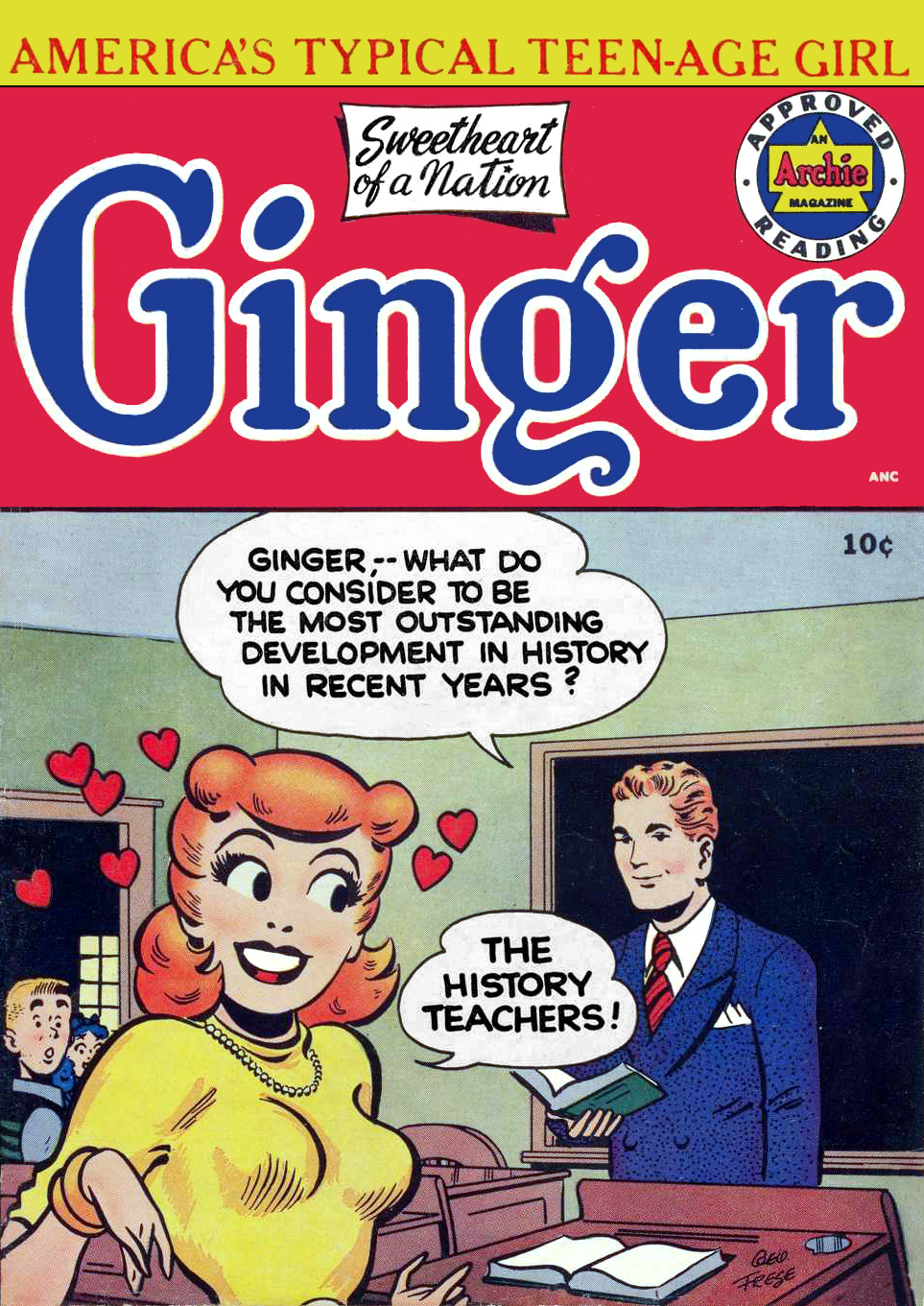
Ginger #1

Maurice Coyne, Louis Silberkleit, and John L. Goldwater formed M.L.J. Magazines, Inc., and started publishing in September 1939. The company name was derived from the initials of the partners' first names.

Coyne served as M.L.J.'s bookkeeper and CFO. Coyne and Silberkleit had been partners in Columbia Publications, a pulp company that published its last issue in 1960. Silberkleit had a college degree from St. John's University, was a licensed and registered pharmacist, and had a law degree from New York Law School. His efforts were focused on the business, printing, separating, distribution and financial ends of the company. John Goldwater served as editor-in-chief. Goldwater was one of the founders of the Comics Magazine Association of America, and he served as its president for 25 years. (The Comics Magazine Association of America is best known to comic fans for its Comics Code Authority.) Goldwater was also a national commissioner of the Anti-Defamation League.

M.L.J.'s first comic book, published in September 1939 (with a November cover date), was Blue Ribbon Comics with the first half full color and the last half in red and white tints. The first issue featured Rang-a-Tang the Wonder Dog. In November 1939 (with a January 1940 cover date), Pep Comics debuted with the Shield, the first US patriotic comic book hero, created by writer and managing editor Harry Shorten and designed by artist Irv Novick. Top Notch Comics was launched in December 1941. Until March 1944, the cover feature of Pep was the Shield when Archie took over the cover. The Shield was a forerunner for Joe Simon's and Jack Kirby's Captain America, being published 13 months earlier.

==== Archie Comics ====
===== 1946–1990s =====
The Andy Hardy movies were an inspiration for Goldwater to have a comic book about a relatable normal person. Teenaged Archibald "Archie" Andrews debuted with Betty Cooper and Jughead Jones in Pep Comics #22 (Dec. 1941), in a story by writer Vic Bloom and artist Bob Montana. Archie soon became M.L.J. Magazines' headliner, which led to the company changing its name to Archie Comic Publications in 1946. Siberkleit and Coyne discontinued Columbia Publications. In the late 1950s, Archie Publishing launched its "Archie Adventure Series" line with a new version of the Shield and two new characters.

The February 1962 issue of Harvey Kurtzman's Help! magazine featured his parody of the Archie characters in its Goodman Beaver story, "Goodman Goes Playboy", which was illustrated by frequent collaborator Will Elder. Help! publisher Jim Warren received a letter on December 6, 1961, accusing Help! of copyright infringement and demanding removal of the offending issue from newsstands. Warren was unable to recall the magazine, but he agreed to settle out of court rather than risk an expensive lawsuit. Warren paid Archie Comics $1,000, and ran a note of apology in a subsequent issue of Help! The story was reprinted in the book collection Executive Comic Book in 1962, with the artwork modified by Elder to obscure the appearance of the Archie characters. Archie Comics found their appearance still too close to its copyrighted properties, and threatened another lawsuit. Kurtzman and Elder settled out of court by handing over the copyright to the story. Archie Comics held onto the copyright and refused to allow the story to be republished. A request from Denis Kitchen in 1983 to include the story in his Goodman Beaver reprint collection was turned down. After The Comics Journal co-owner Gary Groth discovered that Archie Comics had allowed the copyright on "Goodman Goes Playboy" to expire, he had the story reprinted in The Comics Journal #262 (September 2004), and made it available as a PDF on the magazine's website.

In the mid-1960s, during the period fans and historians call the Silver Age of Comic Books, Archie switched its superheroes to a new imprint, "Mighty Comics Group," with the MLJ heroes done in the campy humor of the Batman TV show. This imprint ended in 1967.

In the early 1970s, Archie Enterprises Inc. went public. Just over 10 years later, Louis Silberkleit's son Michael and John Goldwater's son Richard returned Archie Comic Publications to private ownership. Michael Silberkleit served as chairman and co-publisher, while Richard Goldwater served as president and co-publisher. Coyne retired in the 1970s as CFO.

In the 1970s and 1980s, Spire Christian Comics, a line of comic books by Fleming H. Revell, obtained license to feature the Archie characters in several of its titles, including Archie's Sonshine, Archie's Roller Coaster, Archie's Family Album, and Archie's Parables. These comics used Archie and his friends to tell stories with strong Christian themes and morals, sometimes incorporating Bible scripture. In at least one instance, the regular characters meet a Christ-like figure on the beach, and listen as he gently preaches Christian values.

Archie launched a short-lived fantasy and horror imprint, Red Circle Comics, in the 1970s. The company revived that imprint in the 1980s for its brief line of superhero comics. Later in 1988, in the wake of the rise of the direct market, Archie planned to publish superheroes again with the Spectrum Comics imprint, by editor-in-chief Scott Fulop, featuring a number of high-profile talents, but it cancelled this attempt before publishing a single issue in 1989, citing excessive violent content.

Having licensed Archie's MLJ Superheroes in 1991, DC Comics launched its imprint Impact Comics with these heroes.

In 1992, Archie partnered with Sega to create a four-part Sonic the Hedgehog comic book miniseries based on the video game series of the same name. This was continued with a full series launch in 1993, which incorporated elements from the 1993 animated series by DiC Entertainment. The series ran for over 20 years, becoming the longest-running comic series based on a video game by 2008.

===== 2000s =====
On April 4, 2003, Dad's Garage Theatre Company in Atlanta was scheduled to debut a new play by Roberto Aguirre-Sacasa, Archie's Weird Fantasy, which depicted Riverdale's most famous resident coming out of the closet and moving to New York. The day before the play was scheduled to open, Archie Comics issued a cease and desist order, threatening litigation if the play proceeded as written. Dad's Garage artistic director Sean Daniels said, "The play was to depict Archie and his pals from Riverdale growing up, coming out and facing censorship. Archie Comics thought if Archie was portrayed as being gay, that would dilute and tarnish his image." It opened a few days later as "Weird Comic Book Fantasy" with the character names changed. In 2014, Aguirre-Sacasa would become Archie's Chief Creative Officer.

Bill Yoshida learned comic book lettering from Ben Oda and was hired in 1965 by Archie Comics, where he averaged 75 pages a week for 40 years for an approximate total of 156,000 pages.

Archie Comics sued music duo The Veronicas for trademark infringement in 2005 over the band's name, which Archie Comics alleges was taken from the comic book character. Archie Comics and Sire Records (The Veronicas's record label) reached a settlement involving co-promotion.

In 2007, Archie Comics launched a "new look" series of stories, featuring Archie characters drawn in an updated, less cartoony style similar to the characters' first appearance. There are a total of seven storylines and each one was published as a four-part storyline in a digest series. Also each "new look" story was based on a Riverdale High novel, a series of twelve novels; seven that are published, five that are not. They were published in the 1990s.

Title	Featured character(s)	Comic Release	Publication Date	Riverdale High Novel Counterpart
"Bad Boy Trouble"	Veronica, Betty	Betty & Veronica Double Digest #151–154	July–October 2007	"The New Kid. Grrrrr."
"The Matchmakers"	Jughead	Jughead's Double Digest #139–142	April–August 2008	"First Kiss by Jughead Jones"
"Break-up Blues"	Moose, Midge	Archie's Pals 'n' Gals Double Digest #125–128	October 2008 – February 2009	"Big children. BIG challenges. Divorced."
"My Father's Betrayal"	Hiram Lodge, Veronica	Betty & Veronica Double Digest #170–173	May–August 2009	"No Archies Allowed"
"Goodbye Forever"	Archie	Archie's Double Digest #200–203	July–November 2009	"Will Archie Comics Have Its Defunct Date?"
"A Funny Kind of Love"	Reggie	Archie's Pals n' Gals Double Digest #135–138	September 2009 – February 2010	"Reggie Mantle, Prankster"
"No Baseball for Betty"	Betty	Betty & Veronica Double Digest #180–183	May–August 2010	"Hit a Home Run"

In 2008, Archie Publications once again licensed DC Comics its MLJ Super heroes for a DC Universe integrated line, Red Circle.

===== 2010–present =====
Following Richard Goldwater's death in 2007 and Michael Silberkleit's in 2008, Silberkleit's widow Nancy and Goldwater's half-brother Jonathan became co-CEOs in 2009. Nancy Silberkleit, a former elementary-school art teacher, was given responsibility for scholastic and theater projects, and Jon Goldwater, a former rock/pop music manager, was responsible for running the company's day-to-day publishing and entertainment efforts. The company sued Silberkleit in July 2011, and Goldwater filed another lawsuit against her in January 2012, alleging she was making bad business decisions and alienating staff; she in turn sued him for defamation. As of February 2012, New York Supreme Court Judge Shirley Kornreich, in Manhattan, had fined Silberkleit $500 for violating the court's autumn order temporarily barring her from the company's headquarters, and said the court might appoint a temporary receiver to protect the company's assets. As of May 2016, these legal proceedings had been resolved.

Beginning in 2010, the company partnered with Random House Publisher Services for its bookstore distribution which included trade paperbacks, original graphic novels and additional book formats. Archie Comics saw its graphic novel and collected edition output increase from 11 book titles that year to 33 in 2012, and 40 in 2013. The company's sales also increased by 410% for books and 1,000% for e-books since 2010.

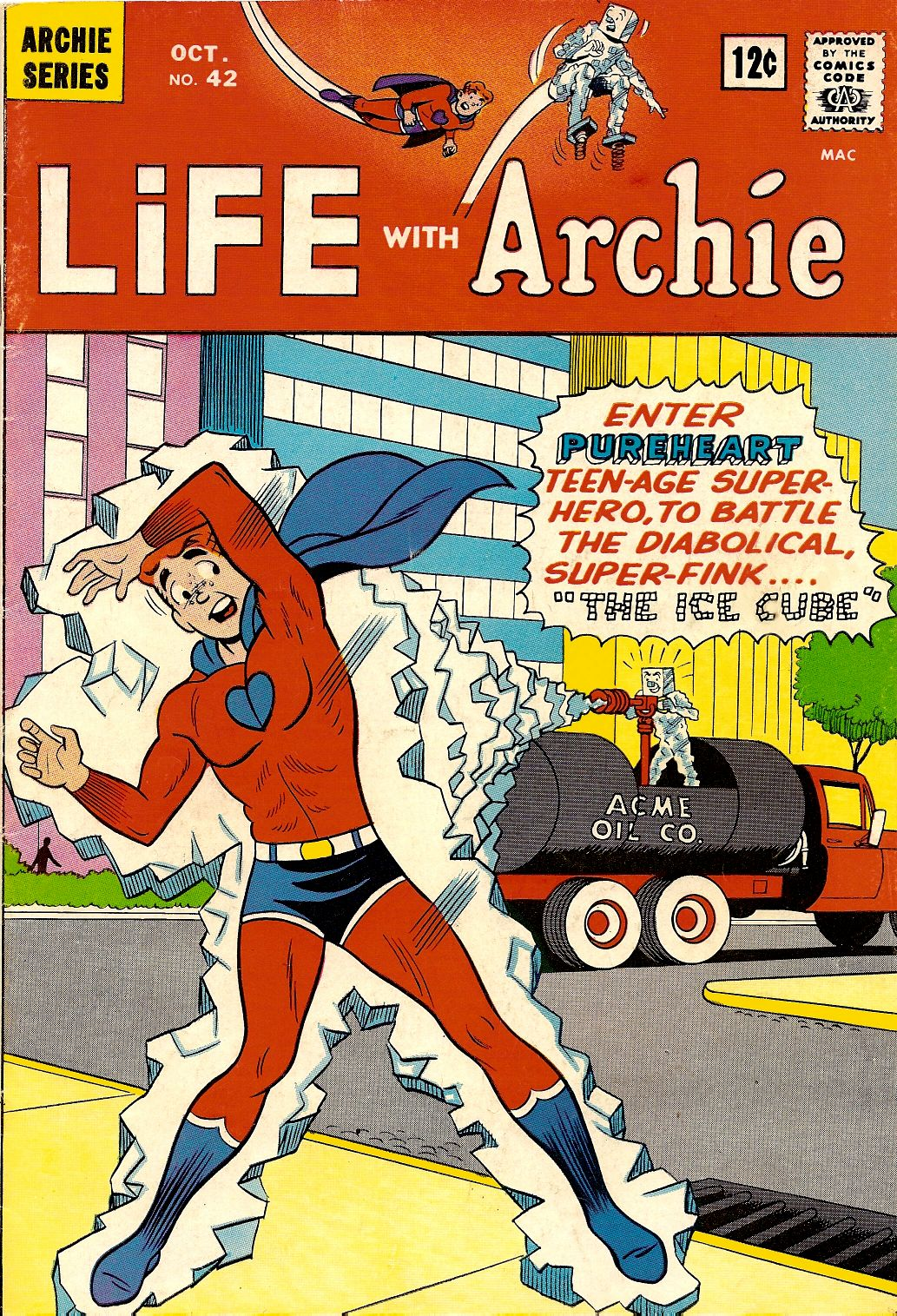
Life with Archie #42

Beginning in July 2010, the first issue of Life with Archie was launched. The series featured two different storylines exploring two possible futures — a world where Archie marries Betty and a world where he marries Veronica. The series also incorporated more contemporary themes including death, marriage woes, same-sex marriage, cancer, financial problems and gun control.

Kevin Keller, Archie Comics' first gay character, debuted in Veronica #202 in September 2010. The character was created out of a conversation between Goldwater and longtime Archie Comics writer-artist Dan Parent during the company's first creative summit, about bringing more diversity to Riverdale. The issue sold out at the distributor level, prompting Archie Comics for the first time to issue a second edition of a comic. In June 2011, Keller was featured in his own four-part miniseries. A bimonthly Kevin Keller series launched with writer-artist Parent in early 2012 received a GLAAD award for Outstanding Comic Book the following year.

In March 2011, a copy of Archie Comics #1, first published in 1942, was sold at auction for $167,300, a record for a non-superhero comic book.

In April 2011, Archie Comics became the first mainstream comic-book publisher to make its entire line available digitally on the same day as the print release. At the New York Comic Con in October 2011, Archie Comics announced that its superheroes would return as an all-digital line under the Red Circle imprint, a subscription model with back-issue archive access. The imprint started in 2012 with a new New Crusaders series.

In October 2013, Archie Comics launched its first horror title, Afterlife with Archie, depicting Archie and the gang dealing with a zombie apocalypse that begins in their hometown of Riverdale. Written by Roberto Aguirre-Sacasa and drawn by artist Francesco Francavilla, Afterlife with Archie was also the first Archie Comics title to be sold exclusively to comic shops and to carry a rating of "Teen+". The series adapted the Archie characters into a world with adult themes and horror tropes including zombies, the occult, demons, and Cthulhu.

The success of Afterlife with Archie led to a second horror series, Chilling Adventures of Sabrina, which launched in October 2014 from Aguirre-Sacasa and artist Robert Hack. Chilling Adventures of Sabrina takes place in the 1960s in the neighboring town of Greendale, and follows a 16-year-old Sabrina Spellman as she struggles to balance her responsibilities as a witch-in-training, with her feeling for her boyfriend, Harvey Kinkle.

On April 9, 2014, Archie Comics announced that the adult version of Archie Andrews featured in the Life with Archie series would die in issue #36 (July 2014), which would also be the second-to-last issue. Goldwater said Archie's final fate would be the same in both of the possible parallel futures covered by the series. This version of Archie was killed saving Senator Kevin Keller from an assassination attempt.

In July 2014, Archie Comics announced that its superhero imprint Red Circle Comics would be rebranded as Dark Circle Comics in 2015. The new imprint focuses on self-contained stories featuring the superheroes from the Red Circle library while exploring the crime, horror, and adventure genres. The first wave included the superheroes the Black Hood, the Fox, and the Shield. Dark Circle Comics debuted with The Black Hood #1 (Feb. 2015) by writer Duane Swierczynski and artist Michael Gaydos in February 2015. The mature-readers title introduced policer officer Gregory Hettinger, the new Black Hood, who struggles with an addiction to painkillers as a result of a shooting outside a school in Philadelphia. The launch continued with The Fox (April 2015), picking up where Red Circle's The Fox series had left. The series was co-written by Dean Haspiel and Mark Waid with art by Haspiel. The Shield #1 (Oct. 2015) from co-writers Chuck Wendig and Adam Christopher and artist Drew Johnson debuted a new, female Shield named Victoria Adams. The Hangman #1 (Nov. 2015) introduced a supernatural horror series from writer Frank Tieri and artist Felix Ruiz about mob hit-man Mike Minetta making a deal with the devil to become the new Hangman after the previous person to wear the mantle ascended to Heaven.

Archie Comics launched a $350,000 Kickstarter in May 2015 campaign to help the publisher get three additional series out to the public sooner than otherwise: Life with Kevin, focusing on Kevin Keller, and new Jughead and Betty and Veronica series. Five days later, Archie Comics cancelled the campaign after critical response. The company stated that the three titles would still be published at a later time.

In March 2015, Archie Comics announced that its two delayed horror series would return under a new imprint, Archie Horror, with Chilling Adventures of Sabrina #2 and Afterlife with Archie #8 being released in April and May.

In December 2014, Archie Comics announced that its flagship series Archie would relaunch with a new first issue in July 2015. The new series would be a modern take on the Archie characters by writer Mark Waid and artist Fiona Staples, featuring serialized storylines. After the first three issues, Annie Wu drew an issue, followed by new regular artist Veronica Fish. The new title received IGN's "Best New Comic Series of 2015" award.

The first title in the company's "New Riverdale" universe, Archie was released with a July 2015 cover date and came in at #7 for comic book sales for the month. The next title, Jughead, was released in October. In April 2015, Archie Comics announced Betty and Veronica which debuted in July 2016. Also announced was Life with Kevin, a digital-first mini-series that debuted in June 2016. Josie and the Pussycats and Reggie and Me followed in September and December 2016.

Roberto Aguirre-Sacasa, playwright, screenwriter and comic book writer, was appointed Archie Comics chief creative officer in March 2014. Archie characters landed a live-action TV series, Riverdale, at Fox with a script deal plus penalty in October 2014. Warner Bros Television and Berlanti Productions were producing. However, the show was not selected for broadcast until January 29, 2016, when it was picked up by the CW.

In February 2017, Marvel had licensed Archie Comics to publish Marvel Digests collections for the newsstand market starting in November 2017. With three TV series at various stages, Archie Comics expanded its film and television operations in February 2019 to a division, Archie Comics Studios, with the hire of two executives, Siobhan Bachman, senior vice-president of film and television, and Matthew Lottman, head of development & production.

As of August 2025, Phil Lord and Christopher Miller, the filmmaking duo behind “Spider-Verse,” “The Lego Movie” and “21 Jump Street,” are bringing Archie Comics to the big screen with their production company Lord Miller, through their first-look deal with Universal Pictures.

In December 2025, Archie Comics announced it would be relaunching their monthly ongoing series in partnership with Oni Press. Archie is being written by W. Maxwell Prince and art by Fábio Moon and Nick Cagnetti. Sabrina the Teenage Witch is being written by Corinna Bechko with art by Kano. A horror title called Archie in Hell, is being written by Patrick Horvath and art by Tyler Crook. The new comics will start rolling out in September 2026 with the all-new Archie No. 1 first, then Sabrina in October and Archie in Hell in November.

== Corporate affairs ==
The company's headquarters is in a 10,300-square-foot (960 m^{2}) property in the Sanborn Map Building in Pelham, New York. It was in a facility of Mamaroneck, New York, with warehouse facilities and 7,000 square feet (650 m^{2}) of office space until May 2015, when it moved to its current location. Due to changes in the comics industry with digitization, the company needed more office space and less warehouse space.

According to the publisher, the official Archie Comics website receives 40 million hits a month.

== Characters ==
=== Archie and Riverdale ===
Archie is set in the fictional small town of Riverdale.

The New York Times postulated that "the cartoonist Bob Montana inked the original likenesses of Archie and his pals and plopped them in an idyllic Midwestern community named Riverdale because Mr. Goldwater, a New Yorker, had fond memories of time spent in Hiawatha, Kansas." However, others have noted resemblance between Riverdale and Haverhill, Massachusetts, where Bob Montana attended Haverhill High School.

=== Superheroes ===
Initially, MLJ started out publishing humor and adventure strips in anthology comic books as was the standard, but quickly added superheroes in their first title's second issue, Blue Ribbon Comics #2, with Bob Phantom. In January 1940, Pep Comics debuted featuring the Shield, America's first patriotic comic book hero, by writer and managing editor Harry Shorten and artist Irv Novick. MLJ's Golden Age heroes also included the Black Hood, who also appeared in pulp magazines and a radio show; and the Wizard, who shared a title with the Shield.

Later revivals of the MLJ superheroes occurred under a number of imprints: Archie Adventure Series, Mighty Comics, Red Circle Comics and one aborted attempt, Spectrum Comics. Archies Publications then licensed them out to DC Comics in the 1990s for Impact Comics universe imprint then again in 2008 for a DC Universe integrated Red Circle line.

Archie's Silver Age relaunch of its superheroes under the Archie Adventure Series imprint and then the Mighty Comics imprint began with a new version of the Shield and two new characters: the Jaguar and the Fly. In the mid-1960s with the Silver Age of Comics, Archie switched the heroes to a new imprint, "Mighty Comics Group", with the revival of all the MLJ heroes done as Marvel parodies with "the campy humor of the Batman TV show." This imprint shift soon brought the company its first super hero team book similar to Marvel's Avengers with the Mighty Crusaders. This imprint ended in 1967.

With the conversion of Archie's Red Circle Comics from horror to superheroes in the 1980s, the Mighty Crusaders, Black Hood, the Comet, the Fly and two versions of the Shield had their own titles.

Archie planned to publish superheroes again in the late 1980s with an imprint called Spectrum Comics, featuring a number of high-profile talents, including Steve Englehart, Jim Valentino, Marv Wolfman, Michael Bair, Kelley Jones, and Rob Liefeld. Planned Spectrum titles included The Fly, The Fox, Hangman, Jaguar, Mister Justice, and The Shield. Ultimately, Archie cancelled Spectrum Comics before publishing a single issue.

In 2012, Archie Comics relaunched its superhero imprint, Red Circle Comics, as an all-digital line under a subscription model with back issues archive access starting with New Crusader.

In 2015, Archie Comics rebranded its superhero imprint under the new title Dark Circle Comics. It was launched in February with The Black Hood followed by the launch of The Fox in April, while The Shield and The Hangman followed in September and November.

== Titles ==
=== Titles in publication as of 2026 ===
==== Archie Comics ====
- Shaquille O'Neal Presents... Vengeance Unchained: The Legend of Black Caesar (December 2026)

===== With Oni Press =====
- Archie
- Archie in Hell (November 2026)
- Sabrina the Teenage Witch

==== The Archie Library ====
- Archie Comics Digest

== Honors and awards ==
The United States Postal Service included Archie in a set of five 44-cent commemorative postage stamps on the theme "Sunday Funnies", issued July 16, 2010. The Archie stamp featured Veronica, Archie, and Betty sharing a chocolate milkshake. The other stamps depicted characters from the comic strips Beetle Bailey, Calvin and Hobbes, Garfield, and Dennis the Menace.

== Archie characters in other media ==
=== Television ===
==== Animation ====
In 1968, CBS began airing episodes of The Archie Show, a cartoon series produced by Filmation. Although it lasted only for a single season, it aired in reruns for the next decade, and was followed by several spin-off programs, which used segments from this original Archie show and new material. In 1970, Sabrina, the Teenage Witch got her own animated series, also produced by Filmation. In 1970, another Archie property received the Saturday morning cartoon treatment: Josie and the Pussycats. Unlike Archie and Sabrina, Josie's show was produced by Hanna-Barbera Productions, the company behind such animated hits as Yogi Bear, The Flintstones, The Jetsons, and Scooby-Doo, Where Are You?. The show was followed by a spin-off, Josie and the Pussycats in Outer Space, in 1972. The Archie Show, Sabrina the Teenage Witch, Josie and the Pussycats, and several of the spin-off shows including Josie and the Pussycats in Outer Space are currently available on DVD in complete-series boxed sets.

In 1974, Filmation produced The U.S. of Archie, in which the gang recreated several events from American history, which lasted 16 episodes.

In 1987, DIC Entertainment produced an NBC Saturday morning cartoon, The New Archies. This children's television cartoon re-imagined the teenage students of Riverdale High School as pre-teens in junior high. Fourteen episodes of the show were produced, which aired during the show's only season in 1987 and were repeated in 1989. A short-lived Archie Comics series was produced bearing the same title and set in the same universe as the animated series. Reruns of the series ran on The Family Channel's Saturday morning lineup from 1991 to 1993, and on Toon Disney from 1998 to 2002. The cast was basically the same, but Dilton Doiley was replaced as the "intellectual" character by an African American named Eugene. Eugene's girlfriend Amani was another addition to the cast. Archie also gained a dog named Red.

In 1999, another animated program featuring Archie and his friends was produced by DIC Entertainment. Archie's Weird Mysteries featured core Archie characters solving mysteries occurring in their hometown of Riverdale. The show ran on the PAX network for only a single 40-episode season, and continues to air sporadically in reruns on various other networks. The complete series was released on DVD in 2012. As a companion to the Archie series, DIC also produced Sabrina: The Animated Series, Sabrina's Secret Life and Sabrina: Friends Forever; the cartoons featured Sabrina and her aunts at a younger age than they were in the comic books. Tie-in comic book titles were produced for all of these series.

In 2012, it was announced that MoonScoop would produce a new Sabrina the Teenage Witch series titled Sabrina: Secrets of a Teenage Witch. It ran for a single 26-episode season on Hub Network from October 2013 until June 2014.

In 2013, MoonScoop announced that it would produce a new Archie animated series titled It's Archie, featuring Archie and friends in junior high. The first season was set to feature 52 11-minute episodes, however the series never aired.

In 2021, a television series, titled Superhero Kindergarten, was produced by Genius Brands. The series is based on the comic series of the same name written by Stan Lee.

==== Live action ====
===== 1976 special and Archie: To Riverdale and Back Again =====
In the mid-1970s, two live-action specials of Archie and the Archie characters were aired on U.S. television. "Archie," which aired on December 19, 1976, was a one-hour pilot episode as part of the ABC Saturday Comedy Special, and "The Archie Situation Comedy Musical Variety Show," a TV movie, which aired on August 5, 1978. Both specials featured the same actors cast in their respective roles. In 1990, NBC aired Archie: To Riverdale and Back Again (titled Archie: Return to Riverdale on video), a TV movie featuring Christopher Rich as a 30-something Archie Andrews who returns to his hometown for a high school reunion, and reunites with Betty, Veronica, and several other original comic book characters.

===== Sabrina the Teenage Witch =====
In 1996, cable network Showtime aired Sabrina the Teenage Witch, a live-action TV movie starring Melissa Joan Hart as Sabrina. The film served as the pilot for a TV series, also starring Hart, which began airing in the fall of 1996 on ABC. The sitcom was relatively faithful to the comic book series (despite major revisions to the character's backstory that were later retconned into the comic books), and enjoyed a lengthy run until 2003. It is now available in its entirety on DVD, as is the original TV movie.

===== Riverdale =====
By October 2014, Greg Berlanti was developing a drama series for Fox titled Riverdale with Berlanti and Sarah Schechter as executive producers through Berlanti Productions, and Roberto Aguirre-Sacasa writing the series. It would feature Archie, Betty, Veronica, Jughead, Cheryl, Toni, Sweetpea, Fangs, Reggie, Kevin, Josie & the Pussycats, and all of the parents. In July 2015, the pilot was moved to The CW. In addition to the series offering a bold, subversive take on the gang, Aguirre-Sacasa has described Riverdale as "Archie meets Twin Peaks". The pilot was ordered by the network in January 2016 with filming set to begin in the spring. Archie is portrayed by actor KJ Apa. The series ran for seven seasons from January 2017 to August 2023.

===== Chilling Adventures of Sabrina =====
In September 2017, it was reported that a live-action television series was being developed for The CW by Warner Bros. Television and Berlanti Productions, with a planned release in the 2018–2019 television season. Based on the comic series, featuring the Archie Comics character Sabrina the Teenage Witch, the series would be a companion series to Riverdale. Lee Toland Krieger will direct the pilot, which will be written by Roberto Aguirre-Sacasa. Both are executive producers along with Greg Berlanti, Sarah Schechter, and Jon Goldwater. In December 2017, the project had moved to Netflix under a yet-to-be-announced new title. Two seasons, comprising ten episodes each, have been ordered by the streaming service. Filming for first season will begin on March 19, 2018. It is expected to film back-to-back with the second season.

In January 2018, it was announced that Kiernan Shipka has signed on to play the lead role of Sabrina Spellman, and CW president Mark Pedowitz noted that, "at the moment, there is no discussion about crossing over" with Riverdale. Throughout February and mid-March 2018, the remaining starring cast members were cast, including Jaz Sinclair as Rosalind Walker, Michelle Gomez as Mary Wardell / Madam Satan, Chance Perdomo as Ambrose Spellman, Lucy Davis as Hilda Spellman, Miranda Otto as Zelda Spellman, Richard Coyle as Father Blackwood, Ross Lynch as Harvey Kinkle, and Tati Gabrielle as Prudence. Salem Saberhagen does not appear.

===== Katy Keene =====
In August 2018, Aguirre-Sacasa revealed that another Riverdale spin-off was in development at The CW. He said that the series would be "very different from Riverdale" and that it would be produced "in [the 2018–19] development cycle." By January 2019, The CW issued a pilot order for the series stating that the plot will: "[follow] the lives and loves of four iconic Archie Comics characters — including fashion legend-to-be Katy Keene — as they chase their twenty-something dreams in New York City. This musical dramedy chronicles the origins and struggles of four aspiring artists trying to make it on Broadway, on the runway and in the recording studio." In February of the same year, it was announced that Ashleigh Murray, who portrays Josie McCoy in Riverdale, had been cast in a lead role for Katy Keene, leading to her exit from the former. By August 2019, Michael Grassi announced that there is a crossover between Riverdale and Katy Keene being developed. The crossover episode aired on February 5, 2020.

===== Afterlife with Archie =====
On August 20, 2025, Jeff Snider reports that a new live action series based on Afterlife with Archie is in development by Disney+. By October 2025, the hour-long series had received a script-to-series commitment, with Riverdale creator and Afterlife with Archie writer Roberto Aguirre-Sacasa developing it for the streamer. Aguirre-Sacasa will also executive produce with Jimmy Gibbons via Muckle Man Productions. Greg Berlanti, Sarah Schechter and Leigh London Redman will executive produce for Berlanti Productions, while Jon Goldwater executive produces via Archie Comics Studios. In July 2026, Disney+ greenlit Afterlife with Archie. In October 2026, Alfonso Gomez-Rejon signed on to direct the pilot and second episode of Afterlife with Archie. He will also serve as executive producer of the episodes. The series is slated to premiere in Halloween 2027.

=== Film ===
In 1994, a planned live-action Archie movie to be released by Universal Studios in 1995 was announced. In 1996, it was said that the script was being finalized and the film was scheduled for release in 1997. In 1997 it was still reported that Universal was developing the film's script.

In 2001, Universal Studios and Metro-Goldwyn-Mayer released Josie and the Pussycats, based on the comic of the same name.

In 2003, Miramax announced that they were working on a Betty and Veronica movie, but the project was cancelled.

In 2013, it was announced that Warner Bros. would produce a live-action Archie film, directed by Jason Moore and written by Roberto Aguirre-Sacasa.

An Indian feature film adaptation of The Archies, directed by Zoya Akhtar, was in production for Netflix, with release planned for late 2023.

On August 20, 2025, it was announced that Universal was developing a live-action Archie movie with Phil Lord and Christopher Miller producing and Tom King penning the screenplay.

=== Broadway ===
In 2015, Archie Comics announced that they would be bringing Archie, Betty, Veronica, Jughead and the rest of the Riverdale gang to Broadway with an all-new musical. Adam McKay is set to write the book for the show while Funny or Die will serve as a presenting partner. CEO Jon Goldwater and CCO Roberto Aguirre-Sacasa will oversee production. Triptyk Studios packaged the partnership and Tara Smith, B. Swibel and Adam Westbrook will oversee development of the musical for the company. At this time no creative team for the musical has been announced.
