= 1984 in comics =

Notable events of 1984 in comics.

== Events ==
=== Year overall ===
- The independent publishing boom continues, as Antarctic Press, Continuity Comics, Deluxe Comics, Matrix Graphic Series, and Renegade Press all enter the arena.
- Small press publisher Americomics changes its name to AC Comics.
- Terry Nantier teams up with Chris Beall and Marc Minoustchine to form Nantier, Beall, Minoustchine (NBM Publishing).
- The ups-and-downs of the marketplace take their toll, as Gold Key Comics (also known as Whitman Comics), Capital Comics, JC Comics, Pacific Comics, and Spectrum Comics all cease publishing.
- The Marvel Comics imprint Epic Comics releases four new limited series (Six from Sirius, Timespirits, Crash Ryan, and The Sisterhood of Steel), solidifying the new publishing trend.
- Marvel Comics introduces its Star Comics imprint, licensed titles intended for young readers, with the three-issue limited series The Muppets Take Manhattan.
- Opening of the San Francisco-based Cartoon Art Museum.

=== January ===
- January 31: in Tintin, Alinoe by Jrean Van Hamme and Grzegorz Rosiński, eighth chapter of the Thorgal series.
- British writer Alan Moore takes over Swamp Thing at issue #20, a run which would turn the title around and set the foundations for Moore's career in American comics.
- "The Kid Who Collects Spider-Man", written by Roger Stern, with art by Ron Frenz and Terry Austin is published in The Amazing Spider-Man #248. The story is later selected as one of the "Top 10 Spider-Man stories of all time" by Wizard magazine.
- Shield-Steel Sterling, with issue #4, is re-titled Steel Sterling. (Red Circle Comics)
- The temple of oblivion, by Serge Le Tendre and Regis Loisel, second chapter of La Quête de l'oiseau du temps (Dargaud)

=== February ===
- February 19: in Spirou, Wotan's fire, by Roger Leloup, 19th story of the Yoko Tsuno series.
- February 20: in the Italian magazine Più the humoristic series Gipsy, by Carlo Peroni, makes its debut; it has for protagonists a little girl and her friend, the living personal computer Dido.
- World's Finest Comics #300: 52-page anniversary issue. (DC Comics)
- Nathaniel Dusk — #1 in a four-issue mini-series, by Don McGregor and Gene Colan, published by DC Comics.
- Archie Comics changes the name of its Red Circle Comics superhero imprint to Archie Adventure Series.

=== March ===
- March 5: in Anders & co, Hang Gliders Be Hanged by Carl Barks and Vicar.
- March 18: Political cartoonist Pat Oliphant launches a Sunday comic, Sunday Punk, starring his character Punk the penguin. The comic will, however, be discontinued on 16 September.
- March 19: Bill Holbrook's On the Fastrack makes its debut.
- March 24: Scream! #1, published by IPC Magazines.

=== April ===
- April 8: The final episode of Stuart Hample's celebrity comic Inside Woody Allen is published in papers.
- New Teen Titans, with issue #41, becomes Tales of the Teen Titans. (DC Comics)
- Fantastic Four #265 — She-Hulk joins the Fantastic Four in a tie-in with "Secret Wars".
- Sciopero by Gianfranco Berardi and Ivo Milazzo (Bonelli). Ken Parker kills a policeman to defend the strikers and becomes an outlaw; it's a turning point for the series, that passes from western adventure to sical drama with a metropolitan background.

=== May ===
- Teenage Mutant Ninja Turtles, published by Mirage Studios, premiers at a comic book convention in Portsmouth, New Hampshire. Originally conceived by Kevin Eastman and Peter Laird as a one-off parody, the comic's popularity goes on to inspire four television series, numerous video games, five feature films, and a wide range of toys and merchandise.
- Marvel Super Heroes Secret Wars debuts, written by Jim Shooter and published by Marvel Comics. Secret Wars is the first of a new breed of large crossover events which will become a staple of both Marvel and DC Comics publishing schedules from this point forward.
- Spider-Man's black costume first appears in The Amazing Spider-Man #252, after the character returns from the Secret Wars. The black costume eventually ties into the origin of the popular supervillain Venom.
- Savage Sword of Conan #100: "When a God Lives," by Michael Fleisher, John Buscema, and Ernie Chan.
- Capital Comics suspends publication; its titles Badger, Nexus, and Whisper are later acquired by First Comics.
- Al Jaffee starts drawing the long-running comic The Shpy for The Moshiach Times. Dave Berg draws The Right Thing.
- in Marvel Graphic Novel 9, Futurians by Dave Cockrum.

=== June ===
- June 7: Jean van Hamme and William Vance's XIII makes its debut.
- Mister X #1, by Jaime, Gilbert, and Mario Hernandez, is published by Vortex Comics.
- Batman Special #1, Batman battles The Wrath, by Mike W. Barr and Michael Golden, published by DC.
- The Fury of Firestorm #24 features an insert previewing the upcoming Blue Devil series by writers Dan Mishkin and Gary Cohn and artist Paris Cullins.
- June 23: With issue #689, the British girls' comic Tammy ends its run, merging with Girl.
- June 30: Scream!, with issue #15, ends its run and merges with Eagle. (IPC Magazines)
- In Italy, first issue of the anthological magazine Comic art, by the homonymous publishing house.

=== July ===
- July 10: In Tintin, the ninth Thorgal story The Archers by Jean Van Hamme and Grzegorz Rosiński starts serialisation.
- Six from Sirius — #1 in a four-issue mini-series, by Doug Moench and Paul Gulacy, published by Epic Comics.
- Steel Sterling, with issue #7, is cancelled by Archie Adventure Series.
- First issue of Bella e Bronco by Gino D'Antonio (Sergio Bonelli Editore). The series starring a female saloon owner and a cultured redskin as protagonists, is an attempt to renew the traditional Italian western comics in an ironic and light-hearted way. By lack of success, it only lasts 16 albums.
- Il cobra d'oro (The Golden Cobra) by Alfredo Castelli and Franco Bignotti is released: a special issue of Martin Mystere. It marks the debut of the ditzy stripper Angie, a recurring character in the more humorous episodes of the series.

=== August ===
- Legion of Super-Heroes, with issue #314, becomes Tales of the Legion of Super-Heroes. (DC Comics)
- First issue of Power Pack (Marvel)

=== September ===
- September 22: The first episode of the gag comic Rasher, a spin-off of Dennis the Menace and Gnasher, is published in The Beano, drawn by David Sutherland.
- Pacific Comics goes into liquidation.
- Jemm, Son of Saturn — #1 in a 12-issue limited series, by Greg Potter, Gene Colan and Klaus Janson, published by DC Comics.
- The Mighty World of Marvel vol. 2, with issue #17, is cancelled by Marvel UK.
- Haunted, with issue #75, cancelled by Charlton.
- Child of the stars by Jean Van Hamme and Grzegorz Rosiński (Le Lombard); the album collects three short stories, already published in Super Tintin, and telling the Thorgal's origins.

=== October ===
- October 9: The final episode of Cosey's À La Recherche de Peter Pan (On the Search for Peter Pan) is serialized in Tintin.
- October 24: A non-profit organization is founded, to promote and fund an upcoming museum devoted to Belgian comics, which in 1989 will open as the Belgian Comic Strip Center.
- Superman #400: 68-page anniversary issue: "The Living Legends of Superman." (DC Comics)
- The Incredible Hulk #300: "Days of Rage!" by Bill Mantlo and Sal Buscema. (Marvel Comics)
- What If, with issue #47, is cancelled by Marvel.
- The West Coast Avengers — #1 in a four-issue mini-series, published by Marvel Comics. Writer: Roger Stern. Artists: Bob Hall and Brett Breeding.
- Timespirits — #1 in an eight-issue limited series, published by Epic Comics.
- Crash Ryan — #1 in a four-issue mini-series, published by Epic Comics.
- Original Shield, with issue #4, is cancelled by Archie Adventure Series.
- Ghostly Tales, with issue #169, cancelled by Charlton Comics.
- Scary Tales, with issue #46, cancelled by Charlton Comics.
- First issue of Zolt! by Scott McCloud (Eclipse Comics)
- Babette by Hermann, first album of the saga The Towers of Bois-Maury

=== November ===
- November 1: The first episode of Leigh Rubin's Rubes appears in print.
- November 4: Topolino announces on cover the wedding of Uncle Scrooge and Brigitta MacBridge; actually, in a Massimo De Vita story, Scrooge accepts to marry his eternal suitor, but leaves her at the altar last-minute.
- November 6: In Amsterdam the Dutch comics store Lambiek publishes a special Yiddish edition of Will Eisner's A Contract with God in the presence of Eisner himself.
- November 24: The Judge Dredd story "City of the Damned" begins its run in 2000 AD (the storyline runs through February 23, 1985).
- Wally Wood's T.H.U.N.D.E.R. Agents #1, published by Deluxe Comics, a revival of a superhero team originally published by Tower Comics until the late 1960s. The five published issues of this title feature some of the best artists of the era, including George Pérez, Dave Cockrum, Keith Giffen, Murphy Anderson, and Jerry Ordway.
- Kitty Pryde and Wolverine #1 in a six-issue mini-series, by Chris Claremont and Al Milgrom, published by Marvel Comics.
- The Muppets Take Manhattan #1 in a three-issue limited series, by Stan Kay, Dean Yeagle, and Jacqueline Roettcher, published by Star Comics.
- With issue #273, DC cancels Blackhawk volume 1, which ran from 1944 to 1968, 1976 to 1977, and was revived for the final time in 1982.
- Ghost Manor (vol. 2), with issue #77, cancelled by Charlton.
- In Albedo Anthropomorphics (Thoughts and Images), Usagi Jojimbo by Stan Sakai makes his debut
- Le vent sauvage by Derib, 13th album of the Buddy Longway series (Le Lombard)

=== December ===
- December 3: With issue #2103, Fleetway publishes the final issue of War Picture Library.
- December 3: The first chapter of Dragon Ball is published by Shueisha and Shōnen Jump.
- December 13: in Spirou, Le Bébé Schtroumpf by Peyo; a stork brings Baby Smurf in the Smurfs village.
- December 18: in Tintin, The land of Qâ, by Jean Van Hamme and Grzegorz Rosiński, 10th episode of the Thorgal series.
- Captain America #300: "Cap vs. The Red Skull — To the Death!" by J. M. DeMatteis, Paul Neary, and Dennis Janke.
- The Sisterhood of Steel — #1 in an eight-issue limited series, published by Epic Comics.
- Iceman — #1 in a four-issue limited series by J.M. DeMatteis, Alan Kupperberg, and Mike Gustovich; published by Marvel Comics.
- Blue Ribbon Comics, with issue #14, is cancelled by Archie Adventure Series.

=== Specific date unknown ===
- Piet Wijn wins the Stripschapprijs. The comics magazine Wordt Vervolgd is given the Jaarprijs voor Bijzondere Verdiensten (nowadays the P. Hans Frankfurtherprijs).
- Charles M. Schulz' Peanuts enters the Guinness Book of Records as the most widespread comic on Earth, appearing in 2.600 newspapers.
- French comic artist Jacques Martin is honoured as a Chevalier des Arts et des Lettres.
- Venere in pelliccia (Venus in furs) – by Guido Crepax, from the Leopold von Sacher-Masoch's novel (Olympia press).
- Aloys Oosterwijk's Cor Morelli debuts.

== Deaths ==
=== January ===
- January 1: Frank Baginski, American comic artist (Plainsville, Splitsville, The Loner), dies in a car accident at age 45.
- January 13: Ray Moore, American comics artist (co-creator of The Phantom), dies at age 78 or 79.
- January 15: Tom Hickey, American illustrator and comics artist (Slapsie, worked for DC Comics, Dell Comics, Harvey Comics), dies at age 73.
- January 31: K-Hito, Spanish caricaturist, animator, sports journalist, film producer, publisher and comics writer and artist (Gutiérrez, Macaco, Currinche, Don Turulato), dies at age 93 or 94.

=== February ===
- February 23: Jorge B. Gálvez, aka Jordi Badía Romero, Spanish comics artist (The Super Cats), dies at age 45.

=== March ===
- March 1: Carl Burgos, American comics artist (Human Torch), dies at age 67.
- March 15: Joseph Hughes Newton, American comics artist (Tullus), dies at age 78.

=== April ===
- April 1:
  - Ray Gill, American comics writer and artist (worked for Timely Comics and Archie Comics), dies at age 66.
  - Kurt Klamann, German painter and comics artist, dies at age 76.
- April 7: Vittorio Cossio, Italian comics artist and animator (continued Furio Almirante, Raff), dies at age 72 or 73.
- April 9: Lex Overeijnder, Dutch comics artist (continued Pinkie Pienter, created comic strip based on the TV show Fabeltjeskrant), dies at age 53.

=== May ===
- May 2: Bob Clampett, American animator, puppeteer and cartoonist (Porky Pig, Daffy Duck, Tweety), dies at age 70.
- May 7: Robert Giordan, French comics artist and half of the Giordan Brothers (Franck Nevil, Tom Tempest, Les Francis, Bob Corton, Vigor and Thierry), dies at age 61.
- May 11: Hubert van Zeller, A.K.A. Brother Choleric, Egyptian-British theologian, sculptor and gag cartoonist (the Cracks in the Cloister series), dies at age 79.
- May 21: Ruben Moreira, Puerto Rican-American comics artist (Tarzan), dies at age 61.
- May 22: Alan Maver, American sports cartoonist and comic artist (assisted on Nancy), dies at age 74.
- May 30: Al Hubbard, American animator and comics artist (Disney comics, Tom & Jerry comics, Walter Lantz comics, co-creator of Fethry Duck), dies at age 70 or 71.

=== June ===
- June 4: Sol Brodsky, American comics artist and Marvel Comics' production manager. Also known as Stan Lee's "right-hand man", dies at age 61.
- June 10: Rodolfo Claro, aka Mico, aka René Foly, Argentine comics artist and illustrator, dies at age 82.
- June 12: Bill Wright, American comics artist (Disney comics), dies at age 66.
- June 28: Pete Costanza, American comics artist (Captain Marvel, made comics for Classics Illustrated), dies at age 71.

=== July ===
- July 12: Giovanni Manca, Italian comics artist (Pier Cloruro de' Lambicchi, Macarietto, Don Gradasso Sbudelloni, Tamarindo), dies at age 95.
- July 13: Josep Coll i Coll, A.KA. José Coll y Coll, Spanish comics artist (En Bufa i en Pumpun), commits suicide at age 61 with an electric cable in his bathtub.
- July 24: Bob Heinz, German comics artist (Pif und Alf, Jan Maat, Jerry der lustige Cowboy, Basil der Kätzenkonig, Bob Evans), dies at age 61.
- July 28: Henk Kabos, Dutch comics artist (Tekko Taks), dies at age 71.
- July 29: Fred Waring, American bandleader, musician and comics collector (the Fred Waring Comics collection), dies at age 84.

=== August ===
- August 1: Howard Nostrand, American comics artist and illustrator (The comic strip based on the TV series Bat Masterson), dies at age 55.
- August 10: Virgil Partch, American cartoonist and comics artist (The Captain's Gig), dies at age 67 in a car accident.
- August 17: Bruno Premiani, Italian-American illustrator and comics artist (co-creator of Doom Patrol, worked on Tomahawk), dies at age 77.
- August 19: Don Newton, American comics artist (Batman, Captain Marvel), dies at age 49.
- August 21: Phil Seuling, American organizer of comic book fan conventions and father of the direct market, dies at age 50.
- August 28: Harry Lucey, American comics artist (Archie Comics), dies at age 70.

=== September ===
- September 12:
  - Lola Anglada, Spanish comics artist and illustrator, dies at age 92.
  - Rein Stuurman, Dutch illustrator and comics artist (Bobbeltje de Maankabouter, Gerrit de Zwarte Kraai, Jantje Puk), dies at the age of 83.
- September 14: Lino Palacio, Argentine comics artist (Ramona, Don Fulgencio), dies at age 80.
- September 21: Hugh Stanley White, British comics artist (Rosalind and Tommy's Adventures Among the Chinese), dies at age 79.
- September 25: Laverne Harding, American animator and comics artist (Walter Lantz, Hanna-Barbera, The Pink Panther), dies at age 78.

=== October ===
- October 21: Maurice Henry, French journalist, writer, poet, painter, film director, cartoonist and comics artist, dies at age 76.
- Specific date in October unknown: Stan Randall, American comic artist (Right Around Home, assisted on Ripley's Believe It or Not), dies at age 90.

=== November ===
- November 14: Greg Irons, American underground cartoonist, animator, poster- and tattoo artist, is killed by a bus in Bangkok, Thailand, at age 37.
- November 30:
  - Francisco Flores Montes, Mexican comic artist and painter (Flyn de la Pradera, Capitán Wings, Flash el Vengador, El Noqueador del Barrio, Gitanillo, Mi Hermano Chuy, Angels Infernales), dies at age 64.
  - Frans Mettes, Dutch illustrator, poster- and comics artist (Het Huis Aan 't Water), dies at age 75.
- Specific date unknown:
  - Ben Oda, American comics letterer (EC Comics, DC Comics), dies at age 69.
  - Brian White, British animator and comics artist (Nipper, continued Keyhole Kate), dies at age 82.

=== December ===
- December 7: Otto Dicke, Dutch illustrator, cartoonist and comics artist (Spekkie en Blekkie, Jesje en Josje), dies at age 66.
- December 29: Erich Schmitt, German comic artist (Die Arche Noah), dies at age 60.
- December 30: Mo Gollub, American comics artist (Disney comics, Hanna-Barbera), dies at age 74.
- December 30: Al Avison, American comics artist (Captain America, Whizzer), dies at age 64.

=== Specific date unknown ===
- Guy Brasseur, Belgian comics artist and teacher (Scampi), dies at age 43 or 44.
- Will Gould, American comics artist (Red Barry), dies at age 72 or 73.
- Guglielmo Guastaveglia, Italian journalist and comics artist (early Italian Mickey Mouse comics), dies at age 94 or 95.

== Exhibitions and shows ==
- Summer: Gimpel Fils (London, England, U.K.) — "Strip Language: An Exploration of Representation and Comment, Serial Image and Text", curated by Caryn Faure Walker. Artists in the original art exhibition include Terry Atkinson, Sonia Boyce, Ruth Blench, Daniel Brandley, Eddie Campbell, Sue Coe, Robert Combas, Riana Duncan, Myra Hancock, Clifford Harper, Peter Kennard, Holly Metz, Gary Panter, Savage Pencil, Ian Pollack, Art Spiegelman, Oscar Zarate, Hollis Zigler

== Conventions ==
- Creation Entertainment convention (Omni Hotel, Atlanta, Georgia) — guests include Walter Koenig, Butch Guice, and Bob Layton
- Spring: Atlanta Comics Festival (Atlanta, Georgia) — co-organized by Glenwood Distributors and Marvel Comics; featured the Jim Shooter Roast, with guests Jim Shooter, John Byrne, Bob Layton, Bob McLeod, Mark Gruenwald, and John Romita Jr.
- May 5: Portsmouth Mini-Con (Howard Johnson's, Portsmouth, New Hampshire ) — guests include Kevin Eastman & Peter Laird, and the debut of Teenage Mutant Ninja Turtles
- June: Heroes Convention (Charlotte, North Carolina) — guest: Stan Lee
- June 2: London Comic Mart (Central Hall, Westminster, UK) — guests include John Ridgway, Gary Russell, and Richard Marson
- June 23–24: Colorado Comic Art Convention (Auraria Campus Student Center, Denver, Colorado) — guests include Bill Sienkiewicz, Joe Kubert, Ed Stein, and Drew Litton
- June 28–July 1: San Diego Comic-Con (Convention and Performing Arts Center and Hotel San Diego, San Diego, California) — 5,500 attendees; official guests: Greg Bear, Howard Chaykin, Stan Drake, Burne Hogarth, Greg Jein, Ollie Johnston, Bob Layton, Brant Parker, Marshall Rogers, Mike Royer, Robert Shayne, Dave Stevens, Curt Swan, Frank Thomas, and Al Williamson. The Con is held earlier than usual due to the Los Angeles Summer Olympics. Sergio Aragonés hosts the Masquerade.
- July 6–8: Chicago Comicon (Ramada O'Hare, Rosemont, Illinois) — convention moves from Chicago to northern suburb of Rosemont; c. 12,000 attendees
- July 6–8: Dallas Fantasy Fair (Dallas, Texas) — guests include Mike W. Barr, Kerry Gammill, Fred Saberhagen, Kenneth Smith, Jim Starlin, Roger Zelazny, and Philip José Farmer
- August 3–5: Atlanta Fantasy Fair (Omni Hotel & Georgia World Congress Center, Atlanta, Georgia) — 3-day membership: $25; official guests include Larry Niven, Forrest J Ackerman, Robert Bloch, Sharon Webb, Richard Pini, Peter Laird, Kevin Eastman, Fred Hembeck
- September 22–23: OrlandoCon (Orlando, Florida) — guests include Will Eisner
- September 23: King Kon Comic & Fantasy Convention (Eastern Michigan University McKenny Union, Ypsilanti, MI) — inaugural show; guests include Dave Sim, Bill Willingham, William Messner-Loebs, Fred Schiller, Mike Gustovich, Mike Vosberg, Keith Pollard, Bob McLeod, Jeff Dee, and Tom Morgan
- October 28–November 4: Salone Internazionale dei Comics a.k.a. "Lucca 16" (Palazzetto dello Sport, Lucca, Italy) — festival forced to move outside the city walls for the first time
- November: Mid-Ohio Con (Mansfield, Ohio)
- November 23–25: Creation '84 (Omni Park Central Hotel, New York City)

== Awards ==
=== Eagle Awards ===
Presented in 1985 for comics published in 1984:

- Best New Title: Power Pack, written by Louise Simonson (Marvel Comics)
- Best Group Book: The New Teen Titans, written by Marv Wolfman (DC Comics)
- Best Character: Torquemada, from Nemesis the Warlock (2000 AD), by Pat Mills and Brian Talbot (Fleetway)
- Best UK Title: Warrior, edited by Dez Skinn (Quality Communications)
- Favourite Artist (UK): Alan Davis
- Roll of Honor: Steve Ditko

== First issues by title ==
=== DC Comics ===
Blue Devil

Release: June. Writers: Dan Mishkin and Gary Cohn. Artist: Paris Cullins.

Infinity, Inc.

Release: March. Writer: Roy Thomas. Artists: Jerry Ordway and Mike Machlan.

Legion of Super-Heroes vol. 3

Release: August. Writer: Paul Levitz and Keith Giffen. Artists: Keith Giffen and Larry Mahlstedt.

New Teen Titans vol. 2

Release: August. Writer: Marv Wolfman. Artist: George Pérez.

Star Trek

Release: February. Writer: Mike W. Barr. Artists: Tom Sutton and Ricardo Villagran.

=== Marvel Comics ===
Alien Legion

Release: April by Epic Comics. Writers: Carl Potts and Alan Zelenetz. Artist: Frank Cirocco.

Amazing High Adventure

Release: August. Editor: Carl Potts

Micronauts: The New Voyages

Release: October cover. Writer: Peter B. Gillis. Artists: Kelley Jones and Bruce Patterson.

Power Pack

Release: May (August cover). Writer: Louise Simonson. Artist: June Brigman.

Transformers

Release: September. Writers: Ralph Macchio and Bill Mantlo. Artists: Frank Springer and Kim DeMulder.

=== Independent titles ===
- Aztec Ace, by Eclipse Comics
- Dragon Ball, by Akira Toriyama, first serialized on Weekly Shōnen Jump.
- Echo of Futurepast, by Continuity Comics
- Mister X, by Vortex Comics
- Mage: The Hero Discovered, by Comico Comics
- New Triumph, by Matrix Graphic Series
- Original Shield, by Archie Adventure Series
- Scream!, by IPC Magazines
- Teenage Mutant Ninja Turtles, by Mirage Studios
- Wally Wood's T.H.U.N.D.E.R. Agents #1, by Deluxe Comics
- Zero Patrol #1, by Continuity Comics
- Zot!, by Scott McCloud, published by Eclipse Comics

== Initial appearances by character name ==
=== DC Comics ===
- Barracuda in World's Finest #304 (June)
- Big Sir in The Flash #338 (October)
- Bizarra in DC Comics Presents #71 (July)
- Blackbriar Thorn in DC Comics Presents #66 (February)
- Blue Devil in The Fury of Firestorm #24 (June)
- Bolt in Blue Devil #6 (November)
- Crowbar in Justice League of America #233 (December)
- Demolition Team in Green Lantern #176 (May)
- Nathaniel Dusk in Nathaniel Dusk #1 (February)
- Geode in Batman and the Outsiders #9 (April)
- Javelin in Green Lantern #173 (February)
- Jemm in Jemm, Son of Saturn #1 (September)
- Jericho in New Teen Titans #42 (May)
- Kid Devil in Firestorm #24 (June)
- Killer Frost (Louise Lincoln) in The Fury of Firestorm #21 (March)
- Lady Liberty in Batman and the Outsiders Annual #1 (September)
- Major Victory in Batman and the Outsiders Annual #1 (September)
- Midnight in All-Star Squadron #31 (March)
- Neon the Unknown in All-Star Squadron #31 (March)
- NoMan in T.H.U.N.D.E.R. Agents #2 (January)
- Overmaster in Justice League of America #233 (December)
- Paragon in Justice League of America #224 (March)
- Predator in Green Lantern #178 (July)
- Richard Raleigh in All-Star Squadron #33 (May)
- Red Torpedo in All-Star Squadron #31 (March)
- Cynthia Reynolds in Justice League of America Annual #2 (October)
- Scyla in Sun Devils #1 (July)
- Shockwave in Blue Devil #2 (July)
- Silent Majority in Batman and the Outsiders Annual #1 (September)
- Slipknot in The Fury of Firestorm #28 (October)
- Sparkler in Batman and the Outsiders Annual #1 (September)
- Felicity Smoak in The Fury of Firestorm #23 (May)
- Steel in Justice League of America Annual #2
- Tezcatlipoca in Wonder Woman #314 (April)
- Tsunami in All-Star Squadron #33 (May)
- William Walsh in Tales of the Teen Titans #44 (July)
- Vibe in Justice League of America Annual #2 (October)
- Alan Welles in Vigilante #7 (June)
- Wrath in Batman Special #1 (1984)
- Windfall in Batman and the Outsiders #9 (April)

=== Marvel Comics ===
- Aquarius (Zachary Drebb) in Iron Man #184 (July)
- Aries in Iron Man #184 (July)
- Autobots in The Transformers #1 (September)
  - Bumblebee
  - Cliffjumper
  - Jazz
  - Optimus Prime
  - Sideswipe
- Beyonder in Secret Wars #1 (May)
- Lila Cheney in New Mutants Annual #1
- Decepticons in The Transformers #1 (September)
  - Megatron
  - Soundwave
  - Starscream
- Forge in Uncanny X-Men #184 (August)
- Madison Jeffries in Alpha Flight #16 (November)
- Amiko Kobayashi in Uncanny X-Men #181 (May)
- Kurse (as the Dark Elf Algrim the Strong), Thor #347 (September)
- Leech in Uncanny X-Men #179 (March)
- Magus in New Mutants #18 (August)
- Ogun in Kitty Pryde and Wolverine #1 (November)
- Power Pack in Power Pack #1 (August)
- Puma in The Amazing Spider-Man #256 (September)
- Nathaniel Richards in Fantastic Four #272 (November)
- Rose in The Amazing Spider-Man #253 (June)
- Sin in Captain America #290 (February)
- Spider-Woman (Julia Carpenter) in Secret Wars #6 (October)
- Spot in Spectacular Spider-Man #97 (December)
- Titania in Secret Wars #3 (July)
- Venom (as the "alien costume") in The Amazing Spider-Man #252 (May)
- Walrus in Defenders #131 (May)
- Warlock in New Mutants #18 (August)
- Warpath in New Mutants #16 (June)

=== Mirage Studios ===
- Foot Clan in Teenage Mutant Ninja Turtles #1 (May)
- Hamato Yoshi in Teenage Mutant Ninja Turtles #1 (May)
- Shredder in Teenage Mutant Ninja Turtles #1 (May)
- Splinter in Teenage Mutant Ninja Turtles #1 (May)
- Teenage Mutant Ninja Turtles in Teenage Mutant Ninja Turtles #1 (May)
  - Donatello
  - Leonardo
  - Michelangelo
  - Raphael
- April O'Neil in Teenage Mutant Ninja Turtles #2 (October)

=== Independent titles ===
- Bulma in Dragon Ball Ch. 1 (Weekly Shōnen Jump December 3 issue, Shueisha)
- Chief Judge Fargo in 2000 AD #377 (August 4 by IPC Media)
- Nightveil in Nightveil #1 (AC Comics)
- Northguard in New Triumph #1 (Matrix Graphic Series)
- Bucky O'Hare in Echo of Futurepast #1 (Continuity Comics)
- Son Goku in Dragon Ball Ch. 1 (Weekly Shōnen Jump December 3 issue, Shueisha)
- Zachary T. Paleozogt in Zot! #1 (April by Eclipse Comics)
