= Futurians (comics) =

Fictional superhero team

The Futurians

Group publication information
- Publisher: Marvel Comics; Lodestone Comics; Aardwolf Publishing
- First appearance: Marvel Graphic Novels #9 (May 1984)
- Created by: Dave Cockrum

In-story information
- Type of organization: Team
- Leader(s): Vandervecken
- Agent(s): Avatar; Blackmane; Mosquito; Silkie; Silver Shadow; Sunswift; Terrayne; Werehawk

Futurians

Series publication information
- Format: Graphic novel Limited series
- Genre: Science fiction, superhero
- Publication date: (Graphic novel); May 1984 – present (Limited series); October 1985 – April 1986
- Number of issues: 1; 3 + #0

Creative team
- Writer(s): Dave Cockrum
- Artist(s): Graphic novel Dave Cockrum
- Penciller(s): Limited series Dave Cockrum
- Inker(s): Limited series Ricardo Villagran
- Letterer(s): Graphic novel Jim Novak; Limited series John Workman
- Colorist(s): Paty Cockrum
- Creator(s): Dave Cockrum
- Editor(s): Graphic novel Al Milgrom; Jim Shooter; Limited series Brian Marshall; David Singer

The Futurians is a fictional superhero team appearing in American comic books published by Marvel Comics. The team was created by Dave Cockrum, and first appeared in 1983 in the ninth of the Marvel Graphic Novels series, then in a three-issue run published by Lodestone Comics.

In 2003, author Clifford Meth revamped the comic as a yet-to-be produced screenplay for IDT Entertainment.

== Publication history ==
The characters first appeared in Marvel Graphic Novels #9 (ISBN 0939766817), and the story continued in a three-issue limited series from Lodestone Comics. The series was reprinted by Eternity Comics in 1987, along with the material from an unpublished fourth issue. In 1995, a black-and-white version of the fourth issue material (along with the short story "Less Filling") was published, as issue #0, by Clifford Meth's Aardwolf Publishing. In an inside-front cover essay that appeared in Futurians #0, Dave Cockrum explained:

The Futurians began as a graphic novel for Marvel (Marvel Graphic Novel #9), wherein I recounted the adventures of eight extraordinary humans with powers gained by way of genetic manipulation from the future. The graphic novel did pretty well, went into three printings, and a series was called for.

Unfortunately, I let myself be lured away from Marvel and did the series for an independent publisher who promised pie-in-the-sky money. If I'd stayed with Marvel, we might be publishing Futurians #250 or something by now. Instead, I went with the independent, occasionally called Lodestone Publications, and my run only lasted three issues. A fourth issue was finished; this book you hold in your hands. Due to the vagaries of publishing, however, it never saw print as an individual issue until now. It was collected together with the previous three issues into a limited-edition second graphic novel in 1987. That second graphic novel was short-printed and is next-to-impossible to find.

There has been renewed interest in The Futurians in recent months, and my friends at AARDWOLF and I decided to reprint the "lost" fourth issue, now numbered 0 for this edition, to test the waters for a possible new series. If you bought the three Lodestone issues but never saw the second graphic novel (and I know there are lots of you out there), here's your chance to finish the story.

A four-issue mini-series written and drawn by David Miller, with colors by Joe Rubenstein, focused on the character of Avatar and showed some of his history as he returned home to London and fought Morgan Le Fay. It was published in 2010 by David Miller Studios as Avatar of the Futurians, and collected as the trade paperback Dave Cockrum's Futurians: Avatar in 2011.

== Plot ==
The premise was of an extremely advanced future society called the Terminus, who attempted to alter the past by sending genetic information back through time, to give certain human beings super-powers (and a compulsion to use them) in order to enable them to stop some unnamed disaster. In the late 20th Century, a future inhabitant known only as "Vandervecken" or "The Dutchman" (both names for The Flying Dutchman) downloaded his mind into the body of a hobo who later becomes the owner of the Future Dynamics corporation; Vandervecken then began gathering up those who had been empowered to begin preparing them for their historic battles.

== Members ==
The main characters of The Futurians:

- Avatar: The first empowered human, when we first meet him he is, unknown to Vandervecken, already functionally immortal and has an intuitive ability, which allows him to make accurate predictions based on seemingly insufficient data. Vandervecken's process gives him the additional powers of flight, superstrength, and invulnerability. He also has over three thousand years of knowledge and experience in strategy and tactics. He is the only Futurian to have overcome his genetic conditioning to obey Vandervecken. He has had many names and identities throughout the centuries, the most recent being Andrew Pendragon.
- Vandervecken: The mind of a future time traveller in the body of vagabond who later becomes a millionaire scientific genius. He has vast knowledge of future events and technology.
- Terrayne: Geologist Harry Robbins has become a living mud-man who can manipulate rock and earth. At first he is permanently trapped in this form, but Vandervecken supplies him with a ring that allows him to become human again.
- Silkie: Marine biologist Tracy Winters becomes a green-skinned amphibian with the ability to breathe underwater at great depths, fire bio-electrical blasts, control and shape water, and transform into a humanoid manta ray-like form, which allows her to fly or swim at great speeds.
- Werehawk: Matthew Blackfeather, an attorney for the Dakota Indian tribe, can turn into a clawed, flying hawk-like humanoid; however, when he does so, he can become overwhelmed by predatory instincts and a berserker rage. If he loses control entirely, he turns fully into a giant raptor bird.
- Silver Shadow: Ex-spy Jonathan Darknyte is able to become a living shadow, who can merge with, animate, or teleport through shadows and darkness.
- Mosquito: Dana Morgan gains the ability to fly and generate ultrasonic energy. She also carries a gun that fires anesthetic or explosive darts.
- Sunswift: An immortal fire elemental from Egypt, Neith can survive in space or in the Sun's corona where she currently resides, generate solar-temperature plasma, and fly at tremendous speeds. She is also the former lover of Andrew Pendragon from ancient times. Sunswift must shed a great deal of her power before she enters a planetary atmosphere for fear of accidentally destroying anything around her. But even after doing so, she is still a very formidable opponent.
- Blackmane: Walter Bonner becomes a lion-like being with razor-sharp talons and superhuman strength and agility.

== Film adaptation ==
Clifford Meth, who wrote one Futurians story with Cockrum, has worked on the screenplay for the story which was optioned by IDT Entertainment and, after the rights reverted, he was in negotiation with Richard Saperstein, but that fell through as well.

In 2017, Deadpool co-creator Rob Liefeld optioned the property and said that he planned to revive Cockrum's Futurians. Clifford Meth, representing the Cockrum family and Dave Cockrum estate, commented: "Rob Liefeld is the perfect creator to take on this project. Rob is a fan-favorite storyteller whose personality, like Dave’s, is comics incarnate. He loves the medium, grew up on Dave’s work, and developed a number of his own extremely popular characters such as Deadpool and Cable. Rob will know exactly what to do with The Futurians and we can’t wait to see it".
