= Blue Ribbon Comics =

Comic book series in the United States

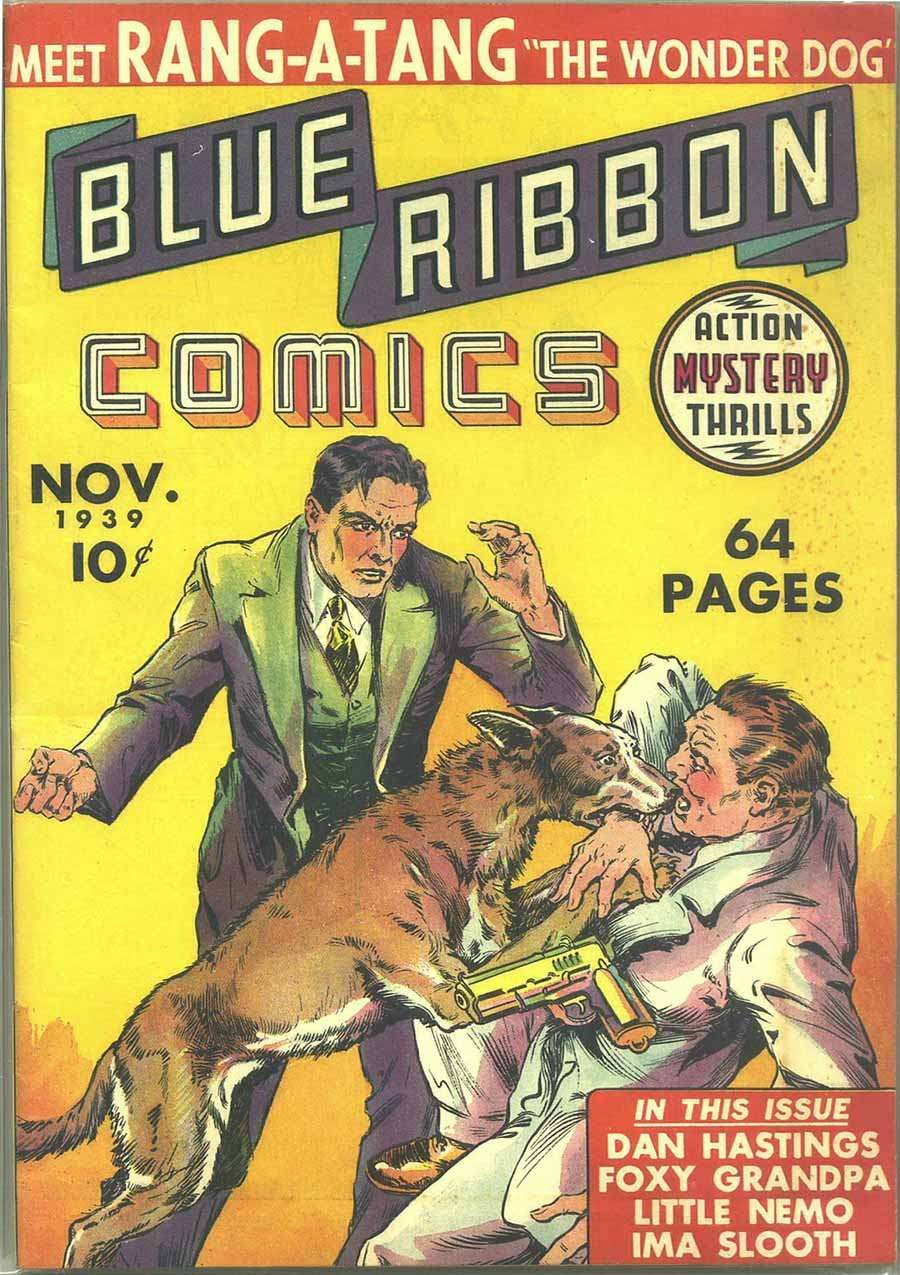
- Cover of Blue Ribbon Comics vol. 1, 1 (November 1939); Featuring Rang-a-Tang the Wonder Dog, art by Norman Danberg

Publication information
- Publisher: MLJ Comics
- Schedule: Monthly (actually irregular)
- Publication date: November 1939 – March 1942
- No. of issues: 22
- Main character(s): Mr. Justice; Captain Flag; The Fox; Rang-a-Tang the Wonder Dog; Loop Logan, Air Ace; Corporal Collins, Infantryman; Ty-Gor, Son of the Jungle

Blue Ribbon Comics is the name of two American comic book anthology series, the first published by the Archie Comics predecessor MLJ Magazines Inc., commonly known as MLJ Comics, from 1939 to 1942, during the Golden Age of Comic Books. The revival was the second comic published in the 1980s by Archie Comics under the Red Circle and Archie Adventure Series banners.

Blue Ribbon Comics was also the title of an unrelated six-issue comic book series published in 1948–1949 by St. John Publications.

== MLJ Comics/Archie ==
=== Volume 1 (1940–1942): MLJ ===
The first series of Blue Ribbon Comics #1–22 (Nov. 1939 – March 1942) was a 64-page anthology comic published by MLJ Magazines Inc., commonly known as MLJ Comics, the precursor to what would become the publisher Archie Comics. Issues #9–18 and #22 were cover-titled Blue Ribbon Mystery Comics. The series was edited by Harry Shorten.

The first title published by MLJ, Blue Ribbon Comics initially ran a mixture of content, in the manner of most early comic books. These included the science-fiction feature "Dan Hastings" (#1–2), crime, short humor fillers, and adventure tales such as, from issue #1, "Burk of the Briny" in #1 and Cliff Thorndyke's African adventure "Village of Missing Men". "Rang-a-Tang the Wonder Dog", the tales of an intelligent dog in the Rin Tin Tin vein, written by Joe Blair and primarily drawn by Ed Smalle, was the only feature to appear in every issue. Another, "Corporal Collins, Infantryman", a war feature drawn by Charles Biro, about a U.S. soldier stranded in France when World War II breaks out was in every issue but the first. As all comic books did through the early 1960s, to satisfy U.S. Postal Service requirements for magazine rates, Blue Ribbon Comics also contained text stories, sometimes about characters from the comics features, such as the titular cowboy Buck Stacey.

With the exception of a reprinted Little Nemo newspaper comic strip story by Winsor McCay in #1, all stories in the comic were new. Reader participation was encouraged; in issue #3 (Jan. 1940) MLJ offered $5 for the prize letter of the month and $1 for 10 runners-up, and issue #4 (June 1940) introduced the Rang-a-Tang Club, boasting its own registered veterinarian to answer questions on dog health and training.

Future Plastic Man creator Jack Cole, then working for the Harry "A" Chesler studio, wrote and drew a number of one off-humor strips in the first issue: "Hold That Line", "Ima Slooth", "Foxy Grandpa" and "King Kole's Kourt." Issue #2 (Dec. 1940) had his "Knight Off". He additionally provided two "Crime on the Run" strips, subtitled "True Stories of Crime", in #1 and #3, and "Devils of the Deep", a two-part adventure in #2–3. Will Eisner, future creator of the Spirit, produced a single humor strip, "Boodini the Great" in issue #1.

By issue #4, however, MLJ replaced the humor strips with more adventure and crime stories, and introduced fantasy-adventure characters such as the mythological Hercules in modern-day America (#4–8); the Doc Savage-like Doc Strong by Sam Cooper, set on a desolate Earth 100 years in the future soon after World War II had ended (#4–12); and the Green Falcon, a medieval adventurer whose feature was drawn by one of very few women then working in the comics, Ramone Patenaude (#4–15). Two long-running features were "Loop Logan, Air Ace", about an American pilot in WWII prior to U.S. involvement (#4–20), and "Ty-Gor, Son of the Jungle", drawn by Mort Meskin, about a jungle boy taken to America (#4–20).

The first superhero introduced to Blue Ribbon Comics was in the two-issue feature "Bob Phantom, the Scourge of the Underground" (#2–3), with early work by artist Irv Novick. Bob Phantom moved to Pep Comics and was shortly followed by the Fox (#4–22), a costumed adventure hero created by writer Joe Blair and artist Irwin Hasen who would return during the 1960s in several Archie comics series. Next was Mr. Justice (#9–22), a ghostly superhero also created by writer Blair although mainly scripted by Charles Biro with artist Sam Cooper. Inferno the Flame-Breather, originally a supporting character seen in Steel Sterling tales in Pep Comics, was given his own feature by writer Blair and artist Paul Reinman (#13–19). The patriotically themed Captain Flag, created by Blair and artist Lin Streeter in #16 (Sept. 1941), completed the Blue Ribbon Comics superhero cluster. Mr. Justice was the cover feature from his debut in #9 (Feb. 1941), then shared the cover with Captain Flag from #16–18, and took over from #19 (Dec. 1941) until the end of the title's run.

Blue Ribbon Comics #21 (Feb. 1942) introduced a new direction, advertising on the cover 'new sensational true life features' , with an inside-front cover editorial explaining the title would now mix superhero and adventure stories with real-life tales: 'Just as many thrills, just as much red-blooded reading pleasure' . The last two issues had features on the life of Galileo, Leonardo da Vinci, and Beethoven, and a tale about malaria in Cuba. Incongruously, MLJ also introduced a short horror story feature, "Tales from the Witches Cauldron" (#20–22) at this time. Despite the change of direction, Blue Ribbon Comics ended with issue #22 (March 1942).

==== Features ====
- "Rang-A-Tang the Wonder Dog" – (#1–22) titled "with Richy the Amazing Boy" from #6
- "Dan Hastings" – science fiction adventure (#1–2)
- "Buck Stacey" – cowboy story (#1–2)
- "Sugar, Honey and Huggin" – cartoon animal (#1–3)
- "Scoop Cody, Ace Reporter" – detective story (#2–3)
- "Bob Phantom, the Scourge of the Underground" – superhero (#2–3)
- "Devils of the Deep" – marine adventure strip (#2–3)
- "Secret Assignments" – spy strip (#2–3)
- "Silver Fox" – police strip (#2–4)
- "Corporal Collins, Infantryman" – war strip (#2–22)
- "Hercules" – superhero (#4–8)
- "Gypsy Johnson, adventurer" – adventure strip (#4–8)
- "The Fox" – superhero (#4–22)
- "Ty-Gor, Son of the Jungle" – jungle boy, sometimes in city (#4–20)
- "Doc Strong" – Doc Savage-type science fiction character (#4–12)
- "Loop Logan, Air Ace" – war adventure (#4–20)
- "The Green Falcon" – medieval knight (#4–15)
- "Mr Justice" – superhero (#9–22)
- "Steve Stacey, Sky Detective" – action/detective series (#9–12)
- "Penny Parker" – action/detective series (#13–15)
- "Inferno the Flame-Breather" – superhero (#13–19)
- "Captain Flag" – superhero (#16–22)

=== Volume 2 (1983–1985): Archie Comics ===
Blue Ribbon Comics vol 2
- Cover of Blue Ribbon Comics vol. 2, 1 (Nov 1983), art by Steve Ditko & Rudy Nebres.

Publication information
- Publisher: Red Circle Comics (issues #1–4); Archie Comics (issues #5–14)
- Schedule: Monthly
- Format: standard
- Genre: superhero
- Publication date: November 1983 – December 1984
- No. of issues: 14
- Main character(s): The Fly; The Shield; Mr. Justice; The Fly and Flygirl; Jaguar; Black Hood

Creative team
- Written by: Joe Simon, Robin Snyder, Bill DuBay, Rich Buckler, Stan Timmons, Martin L. Greim, Paul Kupperberg
- Artist(s): Jack Kirby, Trevor Von Eeden, Gray Morrow, Steve Ditko, Martin L. Greim, Pat Boyette
- Penciller(s): Trevor Von Eeden, Dick Ayers
- Inker(s): Alex Niño, Tony DeZuniga
- Editor: Rich Buckler

The second series to carry the Blue Ribbon Comics name was initially published by the Archie Comics imprint Red Circle Comics. It ran for 14 issues cover-dated November 1983 to December 1984. After four issues, the imprint, initially directed at the "direct-sales market" of comic-book stores, repositioned to newsstand distribution and changed the imprint name to Archie Adventure Series, which Archie Comics had used for its superhero line in the 1960s. Concurrently, the printing format changed from glossy Baxter paper to standard comics print.

Blue Ribbon Comics vol. 2 published a combination of new and reprinted work featuring a variety of Archie superheroes. Reprints including Joe Simon and Jack Kirby stories from Adventures of the Fly #1–2 (Aug–Sept. 1959), and Simon/Kirby Lancelot Strong: Shield stories primarily from The Double Life of Private Strong #1 (June 1959).

However, the second volume largely comprised new stories of previous MLJ/Archie characters: a Mr. Justice origin story by writers Robin Snyder, who also provided a Blue Ribbon Comics checklist over various issues of the comic's run, and Bill Dubay, with art by Trevor Von Eeden and Alex Niño in issue #2 (Dec. 1983). An origin for Steel Sterling followed, in issue #3 (Dec. 1983), leading into a backup feature in another Archie title, The Shield. There were also two new stories of The Fly and Flygirl, featuring Jaguar, by writers Rich Buckler and Stan Timmons, with art by Trevor Von Eeden in #4 (Jan. 1984), and a two-part Fox story by Buckler and Timmons, with art by Dick Ayers and Tony DeZuniga, in #6–7 (March–April 1984). A revival of Black Hood by Gray Morrow took up issue #8 (May 1984).

As well as revivals of MLJ/Archie inventory characters, volume two introduced the underwater adventures of "Agents of Atantis" in #9 (June 1984). On the letters page of issue #10 (July 1984), Buckler signaled another editorial change, to "more lighthearted stories", with more Simon/Kirby reprints from the early 1960s Adventures of the Fly, followed by a reprint in issue #11 (August 1984) of a Black Hood story from Archie Superhero Special Digest Magazine #2 (Aug. 1979), originally written for the unpublished Black Hood #1. The story had already been reprinted in JC Comics #1 (1981). John Carbonaro appears to have bought the work from Archie to publish in JC, then paid Archie to reprint the tale in Archie/Red Circle Comics.

Characters from other publishing companies were featured in the following issues: First came Tower Comics' T.H.U.N.D.E.R. Agents in #12 (Sept. 1984), with art by Steve Ditko on a back-up story starring NoMan, one of the Agents. Martin L. Greim's company-hopping Thunderbunny starred in #13 (Oct. 1984), in a story also featuring Archie Comics' Mighty Crusaders superhero team. The last issue, #14 (Nov. 1984), teamed the Web and the Jaguar. A "next-issue" box in #14 announced that a planned but ultimately unpublished issue #15 would feature a sword-and sorcery adventure, "The Cat Queen", featuring Catgirl by writer Paul Kupperberg and artist Pat Boyette. The series by then had been canceled, along with the rest of the Archie Adventure Comics" line.

== St. John Publications ==
St. John Publications produced six issues of an umbrella series, Blue Ribbon comics, that featured highly disparate contents each issue. It was published from late 1948 to mid-1949, with only issue #4–5 given cover dates (June & Aug. 1949) but postal indicia given as February to August 1949. The series starred the movie studio Terry Toons' talking animal characters Heckle and Jeckle in issues #1 & 3; the romance-themed Diary Secrets in issues #2, 4 & 5 (the last two fully titled Teen-Age Diary Secrets), and, in the final issue, the talking-animal feature "Dinky", starring Dinky Duck.

== Blue Ribbon Fanzine ==
In the 2000s came two issues of a fan publication, Blue Ribbon Fanzine (Nov. 2005 & March 2006), published by Mike Bromberg and dedicated to Blue Ribbon Comics. These reprinted selected Mr. Justice, Captain Flag and Fox stories from the 1940s MLJ Blue Ribbon Comics that were then in the public domain.
