= Deluxe Comics =

Defunct American comic book publishing company

- Parent company: Singer Publishing Co.
- Status: Defunct (1986)
- Founded: 1984
- Founder: David M. Singer
- Country of origin: United States
- Key people: Brian Marshall
- Publication types: Comic books
- Fiction genres: Superheroes, Crime
- Imprints: Lodestone Publishing, Inc.

Deluxe Comics was a short-lived comic book publishing company known for publishing one title, Wally Wood's T.H.U.N.D.E.R. Agents. Lodestone Publishing, Inc., an imprint of Deluxe, published a few other series, notably taking over from other publishers such titles as Futurians and Evangeline.

Notable creators who worked for Deluxe/Lodestone included Dave Cockrum, Chuck Dixon, Judith Hunt, Rich Buckler, George Pérez, Keith Giffen, Murphy Anderson, Jerry Ordway, Keith Giffen, Robert Loren Fleming, Kyle Baker, Mike Harris, Paul Smith, and Ricardo Villagrán.

Deluxe/Lodestone operated in the period 1984 to 1986.

== History ==
Deluxe Comics was a division of Singer Publishing, founded by David M. Singer (11 February 1957–24 August 2013).

In 1984, Deluxe began publishing new issues of Wally Wood's T.H.U.N.D.E.R. Agents, about a fictional team of superheroes that appeared in comic books originally published by Tower Comics in the 1960s. Singer claimed the group was in the public domain, a claim disputed by John Carbonaro of JC Comics. In 1981, JC Comics had acquired the T.H.U.N.D.E.R. Agents rights from defunct publisher Tower Comics (which had gone out of business in 1969; Wood had died in 1981). JC Comics had published several issues of T.H.U.N.D.E.R. Agents in 1983, the last of which through Archie Comics' Red Circle Comics line.

A lawsuit initiated by Carbonaro was eventually settled in United States district court in favor of Carbonaro, with Singer acknowledging Carbonaro's registered copyrights and trademark. Under the settlement, Carbonaro also received, among other things, an assignment of all rights to Wally Wood's T.H.U.N.D.E.R. Agents, previously published by Singer, and an undisclosed sum of money.

=== Closure ===
Deluxe Comics/Lodestone closed its doors in 1986 when several major distributors failed to pay sizeable past-due invoices.

== Titles published ==
=== Deluxe Comics ===
- Wally Wood's T.H.U.N.D.E.R. Agents (5 issues, Nov. 1984–Oct. 1986)

=== Lodestone ===
- Codename: Danger (4 issues, Aug. 1985–May 1986)
- Evangeline Special (one-shot, May 1986)
- The Futurians (3 issues, Oct. 1985–Apr. 1986)
- The Honeymooners (one-shot, 1986)
- The March Hare (one-shot, 1986)
