= Black Bat (pulp fiction character) =

Pulp magazine character

The Black Bat

Publication information
- First appearance: Black Bat Detective Mysteries
- Created by: Murray Leinster

The Black Bat was the name of two unrelated pulp heroes featured in different pulp magazine series in the 1930s, most well known because of their similarity to DC Comics hero, Batman.

== The first Black Bat ==
He appeared in Black Bat Detective Mysteries (published by The Berryman Press), a short-lived pulp which saw six issues, all written by Murray Leinster (a pen-name of William Fitzgerald Jenkins), between 1933 and 1934. The character was called Black Bat in the way Simon Templar was called the Saint; unlike the Simon Templar books, however, the character's real name Marcos Vidal.

== The second Black Bat ==
The Black Bat

Publication information
- Publisher: Thrilling Publications
- First appearance: Black Book Detective
- Created by: Norman A. Daniels

In-story information
- Alter ego: Anthony Quinn

In July 1939, Thrilling Publications (also known as Standard or Better) introduced a new Black Bat in a series called Black Book Detective. Written mainly by Norman A. Daniels under the house name G. Wayman Jones, the stories describe the crime-fighting career of former District Attorney Anthony Quinn. In a clear departure from most pulp characters and heroes, this Black Bat actually has an origin story. It describes how Quinn became the Black Bat after being blinded and disfigured by acid when trying to save evidence against Oliver Snate in court, an idea borrowed a few years later by DC Comics for the creation of both the hero Doctor Mid-Nite and the Batman villain Two-Face (when D.A. Harvey Kent is disfigured by having acid thrown in his face in Detective Comics #66, August 1942; his surname was later changed to Dent). (Marvel Comics later created Matt Murdock, the blind lawyer who gained "super senses" and became Daredevil.) The Black Bat left paper stickers of a bat stuck to his victims, so like The Spider before him (who stamped a blood-red spider stencil on the criminals' foreheads), innocent people would not be blamed for their deaths, and other criminals would come to fear him.

=== The Black Bat and Batman ===
Both the Black Bat and Batman hit the newsstands around the same time, and both claimed that the other was a copy. The threat of lawsuits ended when DC editor Whitney Ellsworth intervened. Ellsworth had once worked for the Black Bat's publishers and brokered a deal that allowed both characters to co-exist peacefully. It is probable that the costumes of both characters were copied from the 1933/34 Black Bat series which featured costumed illustrations of the Black Bat inside the pulps, although in reality, the "Black Bat" in the stories wore ordinary street clothes. Batman creator Bob Kane always contended that the only bat-like man he had seen was the villain from the 1930 film, The Bat Whispers. However, the Black Bat did have a permanent influence on the Batman: chief Batman scribe Bill Finger called Kane's attention to the wrist flaps, which appeared to be gauntlets the rival character was wearing. Subsequently, similar "fins" were added to Batman's gloves which remain to this day.

=== How the Black Bat got his abilities ===
In the first issue, DA Tony Quinn is blinded by acid thrown by a thug working for Oliver Snate, a crime lord, and believes his career is over until a mysterious woman arrives (Carol Baldwin). She tells him that her father is a small town policeman who is dying from a gangster's bullet and that a surgeon is willing to perform an operation to graft his corneas onto Tony Quinn's eyes so that he can see again. The operation is done in secret and when the bandages are removed four months later, Quinn finds that he can not only see normally but can even see perfectly in darkness too. While blind, Quinn had developed the necessary skills of the blind; sharper hearing, more sensitive touch, a better sense of smell, etc.

=== The other characters ===
Like many other crime fighters, Quinn is unhappy about all the criminals who slip through the law's net on legal technicalities, etc. and decides to work outside the law in another persona to bring them to justice, and so the Black Bat is born, with Quinn deciding to keep the role of a blind man and later acquires the title of "Special District Attorney". Con man, Norton "Silk" Kirby, a small-time crook who had tried to rob Tony Quinn (when sighted) one night and had been persuaded to stay on as "officially" a valet and this continued after Quinn was blinded. His many criminal skills are a valuable asset to the Black Bat. Carol, a "resourceful and intelligent girl" who is already working undercover in a gang decides to work with Quinn on his secret crusade and last comes Jack "Butch" O'Leary who risked his life to save a crowd from machine gun fire. None too intelligent but completely loyal and "a hulking giant of a man who was never happier than when his fists were flying in defense of the law and in the aid of the Black Bat".

Quinn has a secret tunnel to a gatehouse at the rear of his house which leads to a quiet street, which he uses as the Black Bat. This is necessary not just because of criminals who want him dead but because of the police too as he works outside the law. Friend to Quinn, the bulky lieutenant, Captain McGrath (under Commissioner Warner) who is so honest he would turn in his own mother if she did something wrong is also enemy of the Black Bat. He suspects they are one and the same (same build, similar voice) and often tries to prove it, with tricks, even once having a doctor examine Quinn's eyes. While Quinn can see perfectly, he can also make his eyes appear like those of a blind person and even a doctor is fooled. Quinn usually turns the tables on McGrath, making him look foolish in his attempts to prove he is the Black Bat.

=== Pulp hero ===
Covers of the Black Book Detective where Black Bat was the main story with some back-up stories were normally dark and featured a crime being committed while in the background shadows is the symbolic face of a brooding Black Bat looking on. Few covers broke with this tradition, like #27 where the Black Bat is seen being attacked by a huge dog and a knife wielding woman.

Unlike many heroes of the pulps, the Black Bat did not come up against the fantastic but battled ordinary criminals who prey on the weak and helpless. The stories were detective stories too with the criminal and details revealed in the last pages by Quinn. Issue 7 has the Black Bat fighting against a gang of arsonists burning down tenement buildings for insurance money, regardless of who dies in them. Issue 11 has the Black Bat investigating a strange plane crash as well as a missing fortune in diamonds, needed for America's war effort. Russia initially started the war on Germany's side so issue 12 deals with Russian spies who commit sabotage and murder in America. Issue 13, a fiend uses a hospital for illegal and deadly experiments, even punishing his own men with horrible torture if they fail him.

Issue 19 has a man who is believed to be the Devil but the Black Bat reveals his trickery. Issue 25 has Nazi fifth columnists steal a supply of bauxite (aluminum ore) which America desperately needs for the war effort. Issue 27 (around this time, page count of the BB stories started dropping due to a paper shortage, to about 45 pages for a time) Prohibition is over so ex-bootleggers move into the commodity market, stopping supplies getting through. Issue 28 features a criminal hypnotist. Issue 36 (Artwork is usually checked for "taste" but this one got through. A woman on the front cover who is obviously not wearing a bra.) One by one, people who know a secret start dying. Issue 38, a man convicted of murder has the Black Bat convicted of charges too on which he must acquit himself. Issue 39 Crooks plan to attend a rich party as detectives and steal two million in diamonds. Issue 40, the death predictions of a man prove too accurate so the BB investigates. Issue 41, in a 73-page story, a killer plots to control the Sentinel newspaper. Issue 44, a jailbreak and bank loot vanishes.

== The third Black Bat ==
In 2011 Anthony Quinn is stated as dead in the Clockwork Comics series Education of a Superhero by Adam Dechanel and a new Black Bat under the alias Steve Ventura took on the daunting legacy. Legacy of the Black Bat is an ongoing series created by Paul Hobbs and Adam Dechanel. Ventura, a former reluctant assassin, has vague memories of Anthony Quinn's past suggesting he is a clone of some kind. In addition to this he also has access to all the Black Bat's former hidden weaponry and tech arsenal in the Bat Crypt. Anthony Quinn's former teenage sidekick Jeremiah Graymalkin helped Ventura begin his new life as the new Black Bat.

== Black Bat in Black Bat Detective Mysteries Index (The first Black Bat) ==
1. "The Body in the Taxi" (Oct 33)
2. "The Coney Island Murders" (Nov 33)
3. "The Hollywood Murders" (Dec 33)
4. "Murder At First Night" (Jan 34)
5. "The Maniac Murders" (Feb 34)
6. "The Warehouse Murders" (Apr 34)

== Black Bat in Black Book Detective Index (The second Black Bat) ==
(Note - Titles in italics have all been reprinted by Sanctum Books)

1. The Brand of the Black Bat (Jul 39)
2. Murder Calls the Bat (Sep 39)
3. The Black Bat Strikes Again (Nov 39)
4. The Black Bat's Challenge (Jan 40)
5. The Black Bat's Spy Trail (Mar 40)
6. The Black Bat's Crusade (May 40)
7. The Black Bat's Flame Trail (Jul 40)
8. The Black Bat's Triumph (Sep 40)
9. The Black Bat and the Trojan Horse (Nov 40)
10. The Black Bat's Dragon Trail (Jan 41)
11. The Black Bat's Justice (Mar 41)
12. The Black Bat and the Red Menace (May 41)
13. The Black Bat's Summons (Jul 41)
14. The Black Bat's Invisible Enemy (Sep 41)
15. The Voice of Doom (Nov 41)
16. "The Eyes of the Blind" (Jan 42)
17. "The Blackout Murders" (Mar 42)
18. "Shadow of Evil" (May 42)
19. "The Faceless Satan" (Jul 42)
20. "The Murder Prophet" (Sep 42)
21. "The Nazi Spy Murders" (Nov 42)
22. "The Seventh Column" (Jan 43)
23. "Millions for a Murder" (Mar 43)
24. Captains of Death (May 43)
25. "Without Blood They Die" (Sum 43)
26. "Guardians in Black" (Fal 43)
27. Markets of Treason (Win 44)
28. The White Witch (Spr 44)
29. "Death For Charity" (Sum 44)
30. "Murder Deals in Ersatz" (Fal 44)
31. "The Skeleton's Secret" (Win 45)
32. "The Marked Man" (Spr 45)
33. "Murder on the Loose" (Sum 45)
34. "Murder Among the Dying" (Fal 45)
35. "Blind Man's Bluff" (Win 46)
36. "The Man Behind Murder" (Spr 46)
37. "The Survivor Murders" (Sum 46)
38. "With Malice Aforethought" (Fal 46)
39. "The Crime To Come" (Feb 47)
40. "The Lakeside Murder" (Apr 47)
41. "The Murder Prophet" (Jun 47)
42. "Dead Man's Plunder" (Aug 47)
43. "The Long Ago Murder" (Oct 47)
44. "City of Hidden Death" (Dec 47)
45. "The Coiled Serpent" (Feb 48)
46. "Inheritance of Murder" (Apr 48)
47. "The Murder Maker" (Jun 48)
48. "The Lying Killers" (Sep 48)
49. "City of Hate" (Nov 48)
50. "Thirty-One Deadly Guns" (Jan 49)
51. "The Riddle of the Dead Man's Bequest" (Mar 49)
52. "Murder's Playground" (May 49)
53. "The Missing Million" (Sum 49)
54. "The Dennison Document" (Fal 49)
55. "Murder Town" (Win 50)
56. "Blueprint of Crime" (Spr 50)
57. "The Murder Genius" (Sum 50)
58. "The Black Bat Fights For Life" (Fal 50)
59. "The League of Faceless Men" (Win 51)
60. "The Dangerous Corpse" (Spr 51)
61. "The Killer Who Wasn't" (Win 52)
62. "The Eyes of Death" (Spr 52) [announced but never appeared]
63. "Hot, Willing--and Deadly" (Win 53)
64. "The Lady of Death" (Spr 53) [was published with the Black Bat character changed to Myro Catin]
65. "The Celebrity Murders" (Sum 1953) [An unpublished story by Norman A. Daniels].

== In other media ==
=== Comics ===
Mask in Exciting Comics #7 (January 1941). Art by Raymond Thayer

Due to the issues with Batman, Nedor Comics, the comic publishing arm of Thrilling Publications, did not create a Black Bat comic series; however, it did create a series with a character called "The Mask", which was based on the Black Bat. The Mask appears in the first twenty issues of Exciting Comics from April 1940-July 1942.

Moonstone Books included the Black Bat in a new series of comics based on public domain pulp heroes called "Return of the Originals", which began in September 2010. Black Bat Doubleshot, written by Mike Bullock with art by Michael Metcalf, was one of the five main titles in the line.

In 2011, Clockwork Comics launched a new Black Bat with ties to the title character in E.O.S. During his introduction it is stated that Anthony Quinn, the second Black Bat, was killed. Who this third Black Bat is remains a mystery.

DC Comics began using the Black Bat name for another completely unrelated new costumed identity for the character Cassandra Cain, who had previously been the fourth Batgirl.

In 2012, it was announced that Dynamite Entertainment was going to relaunch the Black Bat. The first issue was released on May 1, 2013.

Black Bat (Tony Quinn) is one of the pulp heroes in Dynamite's "Masks" comic book series.

=== Film ===
A feature film entitled Rise of the Black Bat was released in 2012 by Canadian company TomCat Films, directed by Brett Kelly and starring Jody Haucke as Tony Quinn/The Black Bat..
