= Norman A. Daniels =

American pulp fiction writer

Norman Arthur Danberg, better known as Norman A. Daniels and other pen names (June 3, 1905 – July 19, 1995), was an American writer working in pulp magazines, radio, and television. He created the pulp hero the Black Bat and wrote for such series as The Phantom Detective and The Shadow.

== Life ==
Danburg was born in Connecticut and attended Columbia University and Northwestern University. He married his wife Dorothy Daniels (nee Smith) in 1931; they both subsequently became professional writers, and collaborated frequently. Danburg typically wrote under the alias Norman A. Daniels, but he also published under the pen names John L. Benton, Frank Johnson, and house names including C. K. M. Scanlon, Will Garth and G. Wayman Jones.

Daniels' early stories were detective tales and thrillers for pulp magazines. His first published story was "The Death-House Murder", which appeared in Detective-Dragnet magazine in January 1932. That year he sold stories to All Detective, Shadow Magazine, and Gangster Stories. In 1933 he sold his first story to Thrilling Publications, launching a long association with the company. Subsequently editor Leo Margulies hired Daniels to write a novel featuring The Phantom Detective, a pulp hero inspired by the highly successful character The Shadow. Daniels went on to write over 30 of the Phantom Detective's adventures.

In 1938, Margulies approached Daniels about creating a new hero series to run in Black Book Detective starting in 1939. The result was the Black Bat, former district attorney Tony Quinn, who dons a bat-themed costume to fight crime after an acid attack apparently blinds him. The character was noted for his similarity to Batman, who debuted the same year, though both sets of creators denied copying the other. Daniels wrote most of the 62 Black Bat stories that appeared from 1939 to 1952.

In 1939, Danberg created a comic book feature, Rang-a-Tang the Wonder Dog, which appeared in MLJ Comics' Blue Ribbon Comics.

Daniels also created the Crimson Mask and contributed to a variety of other magazines in various genres, including The Shadow and Doc Savage. He additionally wrote for radio, and served as a scriptwriter for the serial Nick Carter, Master Detective. In the 1950s, he and Dorothy Daniels began writing for television, contributing stories for drama and western programs; two of Daniels' stories were adapted for the series Alfred Hitchcock Presents. Daniels continued writing into the 1980s, and he and Dorothy donated their papers to Bowling Green University's Browne Popular Culture Library. Daniels died in Camarillo, California in 1995.
