= JC Comics =

Defunct comic book publishing company

- Type: Publisher
- Industry: Comics
- Founded: 1981
- Founder: John Carbonaro
- Defunct: 1984 (as publisher); continued as T.H.U.N.D.E.R. Agents rights holder until 2009

JC Comics (also known as JC Productions) was a comic book company primarily involved with the post-Silver Age iteration of the characters the T.H.U.N.D.E.R. Agents. JC Comics was owned by John Carbonaro (Sept. 30, 1951 – Feb. 25, 2009).

== History ==
=== Acquisition of T.H.U.N.D.E.R. Agents rights ===
Carbonaro acquired the rights to the T.H.U.N.D.E.R. Agents from the defunct Tower Comics, and tried to relaunch them with his own comic book company.

=== Association with Archie ===
Shortly after acquiring the T.H.U.N.D.E.R. Agents rights, Carbonaro made an arrangement with Archie Comics to print and distribute JC Comics' titles, in conjunction with Archie's own attempted relaunch of their old superhero imprint Red Circle Comics. This resulted in cross-advertisements between the two companies and appearances of the companies' characters in each other's titles. Although Carbonaro was hired as an editor at Archie, Archie never owned the T.H.U.N.D.E.R. Agents characters; nor was JC Comics an Archie imprint.

From 1981 to 1984, JC Comics published three T.H.U.N.D.E.R. Agents titles: JCP Features, a single issue featuring early work by the artist Mark Texeira (which also contained an Archie Black Hood reprint); Hall of Fame Featuring the T.H.U.N.D.E.R. Agents, a three-issue series reprinting stories from the titular superhero team's original 1960s Tower Comics series, with new covers by artists including Steve Ditko and Bob Layton; and the two-issue series T.H.U.N.D.E.R. Agents, featuring new stories. Ultimately, the wrap-up story of the latter series appeared in Red Circle's Blue Ribbon Comics anthology title.

During this period, JC Comics also published a single issue of Basically Strange, a black-and-white horror comics magazine featuring artist Rick Bryant and writer-artist Bruce Jones.

=== Texas Comics ===
Also in 1983, Carbonaro arranged for the T.H.U.N.D.E.R. Agents to appear in a crossover adventure with Justice Machine in Justice Machine Annual #1, then being published by Texas Comics. (Note: Texas Comics, based in Houston, was the creation of a few comic book fans who had previously worked together on a fanzine called Comics Informer. The company operated out of the offices of the retailer Camelot Comics.)

=== Dispute with Deluxe Comics ===
In 1984, a former associate of Carbonaro named David M. Singer claimed that the T.H.U.N.D.E.R. Agent characters were in the public domain. He founded Deluxe Comics and began publishing a new series, Wally Wood's T.H.U.N.D.E.R. Agents, featuring top artists including George Pérez, Dave Cockrum, Keith Giffen, Murphy Anderson, and Jerry Ordway. A lawsuit by Carbonaro asserting his copyright and trademark rights was heard in the federal district court for the Southern District of New York (John Carbonaro, et al. v. David Singer, et al., 84 Civ. 8737 (S.D.N.Y.), and via summary judgment, the judge ruled from the bench that the T.H.U.N.D.E.R. Agents were indeed Carbonaro's property. Under the settlement, Carbonaro received an assignment of all rights to Wally Woods T.H.U.N.D.E.R. Agents, and an undisclosed sum of money.

=== Omni Comix ===
Over the years, JC Comics tried many times to launch new T.H.U.N.D.E.R. Agents material. A 1995 deal with Penthouse Comix resulted in a single story in Omni Comix.

=== Later attempts ===
In the early 2000s another attempt to revive the characters was planned with DC Comics, but the T.H.U.N.D.E.R. Agents Archive and some statutettes are all that came of it.

Following Carbonaro's 2009 death, DC briefly licensed the rights to the T.H.U.N.D.E.R. Agents from owners Radiant Assets, and they have since been licensed by IDW Publishing.

== Titles ==
Published by JC Comics

- JCP Features a.k.a. JCP Features the T.H.U.N.D.E.R. Agents #1 (cover-date Dec. 1981)
- Basically Strange #1 (dated Nov. 1982 in copyright indicia, but cover-dated Dec. 1982)
- Hall of Fame Featuring the T.H.U.N.D.E.R. Agents (3 issues, May-Dec. 1983)
- T.H.U.N.D.E.R. Agents (2 issues, May 1983–Jan. 1984)

Published by Archie Comics/Red Circle Comics

- Blue Ribbon Comics #12 (1983)

Published by Texas Comics

- Justice Machine Annual #1 (1983)

Published by Penthouse Comics

- Omni Comix #3 (Oct.–Nov. 1995)

Published by DC Comics (DC Archive Editions)

- T.H.U.N.D.E.R. Agents Archive, vol. 1 (2002), ISBN 978-1-56389-903-4
- T.H.U.N.D.E.R. Agents Archive, vol. 2
- T.H.U.N.D.E.R. Agents Archive, vol. 3
- T.H.U.N.D.E.R. Agents Archive, vol. 4
- T.H.U.N.D.E.R. Agents Archive, vol. 5
- T.H.U.N.D.E.R. Agents Archive, vol. 6
