= Crash Ryan =

Comic book miniseries

Publication information
- Publisher: Marvel Comics
- Schedule: Monthly
- Format: Limited series
- Genre: Alternate history, military science fiction
- Publication date: October 1984 - January 1985
- No. of issues: 4

Creative team
- Created by: Ron Harris

Crash Ryan is a four-issue comic book miniseries created by Ron Harris and published by Marvel Comics' Epic Comics line in 1984.

== Publication history ==
Harris brought back the characters in a four-part story that ran in Dark Horse Presents #44-46 (September 1990 - November 1990).

In 2026, Heroic Publishing reprinted the original miniseries as a backup feature in the first four issues of Alter Ego Deluxe, the lead feature of which was also drawn by Harris. This was the first publication of the original Crash Ryan stories since 1984.

== Plot ==
The story takes place in the mid-1930s, and details the fight between the United Airmen and their merciless foe "The Doom". The Doom and his men attack Pearl Harbor and invade and takeover Japan until being defeated by the United Airmen, leaving a power vacuum in the Pacific.

In the story in DHP, set 2 months later, Crash and his friend encounter air pirates using left over Doomsmen planes, while the Soviet Union takes advantage by taking over Japan.

== In other media ==
In 2015, a film adaptation was in development, with Ryan Heppe producing, but seems to have ceased after no further announcements.
