= Evangeline (comics) =

Comic book series

- Guns of Mars, cover by Judith Hunt and Ricardo Villagrán.

Publication information
- Publisher: Comico Comics; Lodestone Comics; First Comics
- Publication date: 1984–1989
- Main character(s): Evangeline; Johnny Six; Cardinal Szn

Creative team
- Created by: Chuck Dixon and Judith Hunt
- Written by: Chuck Dixon and Judith Hunt
- Penciller: Judith Hunt
- Inker: Ricardo Villagrán
- Letterer: Ed J. King

Evangeline is a 1980s American comic book co-created and written initially by then-husband and wife team Chuck Dixon and Judith Hunt, with pencils by Hunt and inks by Ricardo Villagrán. Letters were by cartoonist and letterer Ed King of the Star Wars comic strip.

The art for the first few issues of Evangeline was unusual for American comics of the time, in that it was not printed using process color, but instead each page was hand-painted by Hunt and then color separated. This method was introduced by the newly formed independent comic companies and was encouraged by the cheaper printing methods of the 1980s. Cover paintings were also illustrated by Hunt and Villagran.

The title character has been described as "a sexy killer vigilante nun" taking her instructions directly from her mentor, Cardinal Szn, a politically powerful figure in the hierarchy of the Roman Curia/Vatican during the 23rd-century. Co-creator Hunt however would describe her as a skilled but naive feminist character created "to explore the infinite conflict between good and evil and the powerful religions which would be involved in manipulating the politics and economics of the future".

== Publication history ==
A fourteen-page premier story was released for sale in December, 1983, by Comico's Primer #6. The feature was printed in black & white only. This was quickly followed by Evangeline's own title in full color, on sale in January, 1984. An ownership dispute in 1985 led to Evangeline leaving Comico, resulting in a 1986 special from Lodestone Comics that reprinted the two Comico issues with additional pages bridging the stories (an epilogue to Guns of Mars and a prologue to "Dinosaur Farm" from the First Comics series), and then a 12-issue run from 1987 to 1989 published by First Comics. Hunt co-wrote and illustrated only the first few issues of the First Comics series, leaving to pursue her design and illustration licensing work for HA! Henson Associates and Macmillan Publishing on Raggedy Ann and Andy. In an interview with the Comics Buyer's Guide, Judith Hunt said that (after she left), "the comic [Evangeline] lost its original complexity and feminist standpoint and became just another excuse for depictions of gratuitous sex and violence".

Twenty-one years after ceasing publication, the first three issues of new content were made available at EvangelineTheComic.com, with announced-but-delayed plans to continue with new material which would continue on after issue #3, not following the continuity of the later First Comics issues. The announced writer for the new material was Ben Dixon, Chuck Dixon and Hunt's son, with announced art by Hunt for one story. As of 2016, the site was no longer existing, except for its preservation at the Internet Archive.

== Cultural references ==
The Matthew Sweet album, Girlfriend, featured a song titled "Evangeline", sung from the point of view of character Johnny Six.
