= Rang-a-Tang the Wonder Dog =

1939-1942 canine adventure hero

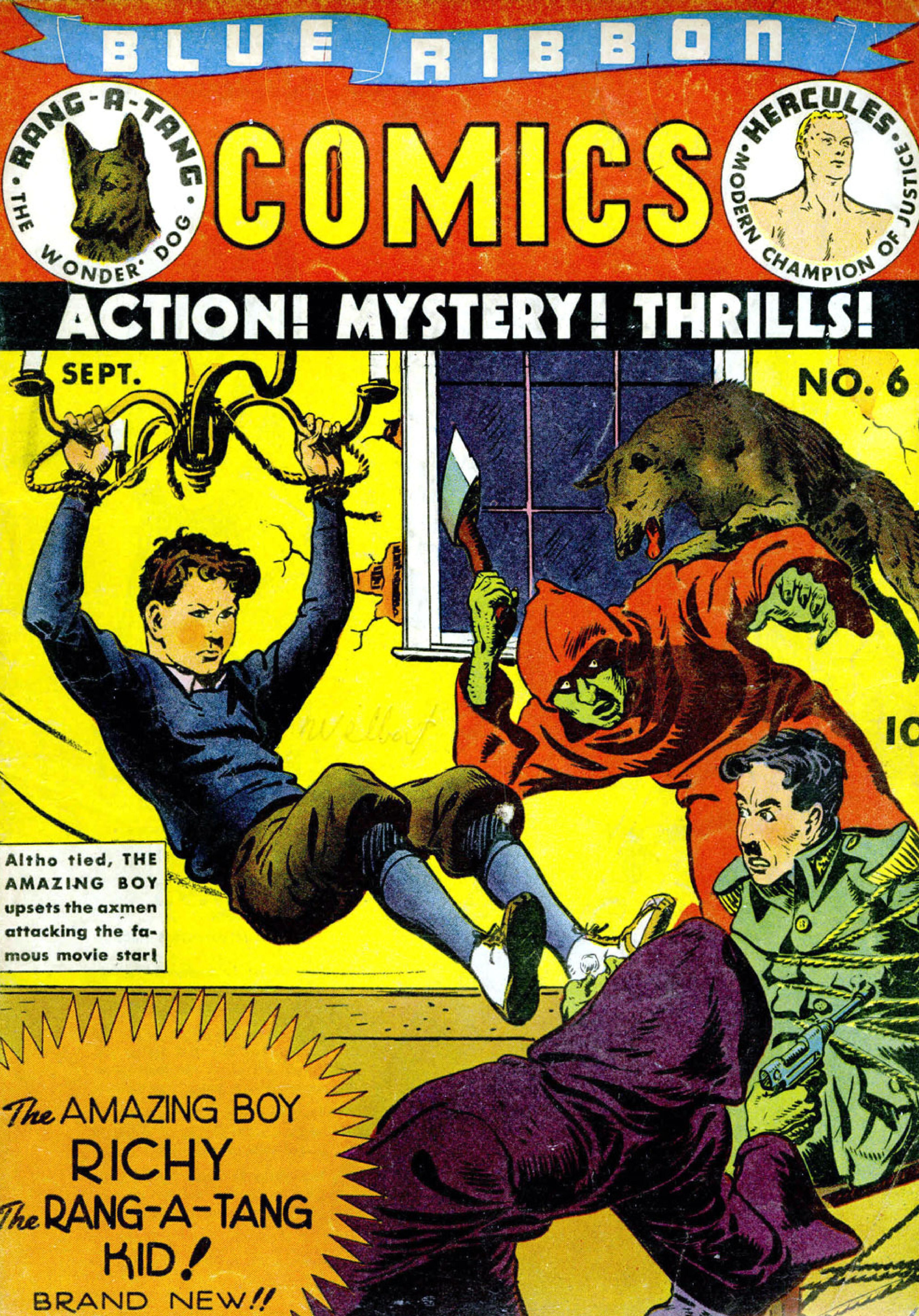
- Blue Ribbon Comics #6 (Sept. 1940), with Rang-a-Tang the Wonder Dog and Richy the Amazing Boy saving Charlie Chaplin from hooded Bundonian thugs

Publication information
- Publisher: MLJ Comics
- First appearance: Blue Ribbon Comics #1 (November 1939)
- Created by: Norman Danberg and Will Harr

In-story information
- Species: German Shepherd
- Abilities: Intelligence, super-keen eyes, sensitive ears and unerring sense of smell

Rang-a-Tang the Wonder Dog is a fictional canine adventure hero who appeared in Blue Ribbon Comics, published from 1939 to 1942 by MLJ Comics (later renamed Archie Comics) during the Golden Age of Comic Books. The character was created by writer Norman Danberg and artist Will Harr, although another creative team, writer Joe Blair and artist Ed Smalle, produced most of his adventures.

Rang-a-Tang is a circus-trained German shepherd who solves crimes at a movie studio in Hollywood, California, with the help of detective Hy Speed and former child actor Richy the Amazing Boy. The unusually intelligent dog, described as having an "almost-human brain", can understand human speech, including the person's tone of voice and moral character. He was inspired by the famous canine silent film star Rin Tin Tin, a real-life German Shepherd considered intelligent and talented. When Rang-a-Tang reaches Hollywood in issue #5, his stories feature thinly-disguised caricatures of 1940s film stars, including Nawson Swelles, Tana Lurner, Stark Brable and Harly Shaplyn.

Rang-a-Tang was the first cover star of Blue Ribbon Comics and therefore the first in Archie Comics' long history, premiering in issue #1 (Nov 1939) and running through the end of the title, issue #22 (March 1942). Starting with issue #4, Blue Ribbon offered membership in the Rang-a-Tang Club for ten cents, as well as the Rang-a-Tang Honor Legion for young readers who performed an exceptional deed in the service of animalkind.

== History ==
"Rang-a-Tang the Wonder Dog" was introduced in Blue Ribbon Comics #1 (Nov 1939) in a story by Norman Danberg and Will Harr, who worked for comic book packager Harry "A" Chesler's studio.

"Running away from a cruel dog trainer with a small time carnival," the opening narration explains, "Rang-a-Tang shifts for himself." Wandering the streets, Rang happens upon two hit men who have been paid to kill a detective. The dog, "trained to understand the human voice," immediately recognizes that the pair are bad people, and he saves the intended victim by jumping on the gunmen. Grateful, detective Hy Speed instantly recognizes the dog's sterling qualities and takes him along on his stakeout outside the hideout of gangster Blackie Blade, who's kidnapped a young woman. Rang-a-Tang doesn't speak, but his mental state is described by the narrator; when Hy hatches a complex plan to save the girl, the narrator explains, "Rang understood very well. He knew the girl must be out of the building before Blackie and his men could be attacked." When the case is solved, Hy tells Rang that he's now an official member of the police force.

Disappointed with the first few issues of Blue Ribbon Comics, which also introduced superhero Bob Phantom, the publishers took a six-month break between issues #3 and 4, during which they hired various staff members away from the Chesler studio to form their own in-house bullpen.

When issue #4 was published in June 1940, Rang-a-Tang had a new focus, thanks to Joe Blair and Ed Smalle, making an abrupt move away from the original urban crime adventure premise. In the book, Rang-a-Tang's heroics have earned him a "nation-wide reputation as the Wonder Dog", and he's invited with his master to come to Hollywood and become a film star for Mammoth Pictures.

Issue #4 also introduced the Rang-a-Tang Club, which was promoted with a two-page ad in every issue. Membership in the club cost ten cents, and members received a membership card and a Rang-a-Tang pinback button, as well as the advice and counsel of the club's veterinarian, who corresponded by letter with members who had questions about dog care. Members could also qualify for the Rang-a-Tang Honor Legion by writing a letter "relating an exceptional deed you performed involving kindness or courage toward any animal, be it dog, cat, horse, bird or wild life." Honorees were listed on the club page with excerpts of their letters, and received an engraved Rang-a-Tang Honor Legion diploma signed by Joe Blair, Ed Smalle and the club's veterinarian.

In issue #5 (July 1940), Rang-a-Tang and Hy Speed arrive at the Mammoth Pictures studio, which is troubled because of mysterious accidents on the set of "boy wonder" Nawson Swelles' latest epic. The dog saves one starlet from a runaway horse and another from an uncaged lion, and finally deduces that Swelles himself is responsible for sabotaging the film. He indicates this to his partner by putting on a beret, glasses and pipe in imitation of Swelles, and the pair chase the villainous director up some scaffolding and make him fall to his death. Grateful, Mr. Wyngold offers the dog a film contract.

Issue #6 (Sept 1940) introduced the series' third regular cast member — Richy Waters, a former child star known as Richy the Amazing Boy. Richy assists Rang and Hy with apprehending a gang of Bundonians threatening director Harly Shaplyn, and the trio become inseparable from then on.

Unfortunately for Rang-a-Tang, the coming vogue in comic books was superheroes, and by issue #9, he was pushed off the cover in favor of MLJ's new caped sensations, Mr. Justice and Captain Flag. Rang's adventures continued to appear as the second feature for the rest of the comic's run.

In the last six months of the strip, the trio start to drift away from Hollywood to seek adventure elsewhere, including a circus, a racecourse and Washington, D.C., tracking down kidnappers, murderers and fraudulent spiritualists. In his final adventure in issue #22, Rang-a-Tang gets lost in the North Woods and has to kill and eat a bear.
