= Clifford Meth =

American writer, editor, and publisher

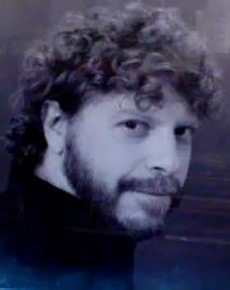
- Meth in 2012
- Born: Rockaway, New Jersey, U.S.
- Areas: Writer, Editor, Publisher
- Notable works: Aardwolf Publishing

Clifford Meth is an American writer, editor, and publisher of dark fiction. His publishing imprint was Aardwolf Publishing. He has described his writings as "self consciously Jewish."

== Early life and education ==
Meth grew up in Rockaway, New Jersey, and he attended Morris Hills High School. He attended Rutgers University and Fairleigh Dickinson University in the United States, and Wroxton College in the United Kingdom.

Meth was associated with the Chabad-Lubavitch religious movement in the 1980s, but moved away from the movement following the death of the Lubavitcher Rebbe in 1994.

== Career ==
In the early 1980s, Meth worked as a staff editor for Electronic Design while freelancing for the Los Angeles Times Entertainment Newswire, Fangoria, Starlog, Billboard, and other publications.

One of Meth's first published fictional works was "I, Gezheh", which dealt with abuse. Author Robert Bloch provided an afterword for the story, which was illustrated by Dave Cockrum.

With the aid of Cockrum and fantasy artist Gray Morrow, Meth co-founded Aardwolf Publishing, along with business partner Jim Reeber in 1994. The company has published a series of comic books, art portfolios, and collections of illustrated fiction.

In 2004, Meth joined IDT Entertainment's Creative Development team. and worked on Showtime's Masters of Horror series and ABC's Masters of Science Fiction. In 2004, he was story editor for Gene Roddenberry's Starpoint Academy, an animated feature screenplay IDT hired Peter David to script. Meth left IDT Entertainment in 2006 when the division was sold to Liberty Media. In 2007 he oversaw the acquisition of IDW Publishing by IDT Corporation and joined IDW as executive vice president, editorial/strategies. In 2008, producer Richard Saperstein optioned film rights to Meth's IDW horror comic-book series, Snaked, with Meth as screenwriter and an executive producer, though no such film has been produced as of August 2025.

In 2008, Meth launched IDW Publishing's "New Classics of the Fantastic Series", which published out-of-print Hugo and Nebula Award-winning books, beginning with Robert Silverberg's Nightwings.

As a writer, Meth worked with Marvel Comics' Stan Lee

In 2020, Meth announced on his personal blog that Aardwolf Publishing had dissolved and that he planned fulfilling any outstanding orders.

== Charitable work ==
In 2008, Meth established the Dave & Paty Cockrum Scholarship at the Joe Kubert School of Cartoon and Graphic Art. In 2010, Meth founded the Kars4Kids Literacy Program, which has made significant contributions to such universities as Seton Hall University.

On numerous occasions Meth has spearheaded campaigns to raise money and awareness for financially challenged comics’ creators, including Gene Colan, William Messner-Loebs and Dave Simons.

== Bibliography ==
=== Publications ===
- girl (chapbook) (Fairleigh Dickinson University Press, 1983)
- Snaked (with Rufus Dayglo, IDW Publishing, 2007)
- One Small Voice (IDW Publishing, 2008)
- Billboards (IDW Publishing, 2009)
- Dave Cockrum's X-Men Artifact Edition (Marvel Entertainment/IDW Publishing, 2020) (Afterword)

=== Aardwolf Publishing ===
- Crib Death & Other Bedtime Stories (Aardwolf Publishing, 1995)
- This Bastard Planet: Another Crib Death (Aardwolf Publishing, 1995)
- The White Man Dancing (Aardwolf Publishing, 1996)
- Crawling From the Wreckage: The White Man Limping (Aardwolf Publishing, 1996)
- Crib Death: The Babysitter's Companion (Aardwolf Publishing, 1997)
- Perverts, Pedophiles & Other Theologians (Aardwolf Publishing, 1997)
- Conflicts of Disinterest (Aardwolf Publishing, 1998)
- Wearing The Horns (Aardwolf Publishing, 2003)
- god's 15 minutes (Aardwolf Publishing, 2004)
- METHo.d. (Aardwolf Publishing, 2006)
- Meth, Colan & Other Theologians (Aardwolf Publishing, 2008)
- Comic Book Babylon (Aardwolf Publishing, 2013)
- Dave Cockrum's Futurians Return (Aardwolf Publishing, 2014)

=== As editor ===
- Strange Kaddish (Aardwolf Publishing, 1996)
- Stranger Kaddish (Aardwolf Publishing, 1997)
- Heroes and Villains (with Neal Adams), (TwoMorrows Publishing, 2005)
- Balm in Gilead (Mahrwood Press, 2007)
- The Uncanny Dave Cockrum (Aardwolf Publishing, 2007)
- Nightwings by Robert Silverberg (IDW Publishing, New Classics of the Fantastic, 2008)
- Hothouse by Brian Aldiss (IDW Publishing, New Classics of the Fantastic, 2009)
- Dare by Philip José Farmer (IDW Publishing, New Classics of the Fantastic, 2009)
- Rogue Dragon by Avram Davidson (IDW Publishing, New Classics of the Fantastic, 2009)
- Lori by Robert Bloch (IDW Publishing, New Classics of the Fantastic, 2009)
- The Invincible Gene Colan (Marvel Entertainment, 2010)
- Rich Buckler: Artist, Innovator (Aardwolf Publishing, 2016)

=== Audio ===
In 2008, the album Caged by Septimus Orion included a recording of Meth's short story "Queers", accompanied by music and sound effects. In 2020, the Comic Book Bears podcast interviewed Meth about his work with Dave Cockrum. In 2025, the Jacked Kirby podcast interviewed Meth about his career in comics.

== Awards and recognition ==
- August 2014 Inkwell Awards Special Ambassador (August 2014 – present)
