= Tower Comics =

Defunct American comic book publisher

- Parent company: Tower Publications
- Founded: 1965; 61 years ago
- Founder: Harry Shorten
- Defunct: 1969; 57 years ago
- Country of origin: United States
- Headquarters location: 185 Madison Avenue; New York City
- Key people: Harry Shorten; Wallace Wood; Samm Schwartz
- Publication types: Comic books

Tower Comics was an American comic book publishing company that operated from 1965 to 1969, best known for Wally Wood's T.H.U.N.D.E.R. Agents, a strange combination of secret agents and superheroes; and Samm Schwartz's Tippy Teen, an Archie Andrews clone. The comics were published by Harry Shorten and edited by Schwartz and Wood. Tower Comics was part of Tower Publications, a paperback publisher at that point best known for their Midwood Books line of soft-core erotic fiction aimed at male readers.

Tower Comics set themselves apart by publishing 25-cent, 64-page comics, during a time of 12-cent, 32-page comics. The comics were something of a throw-back to the Golden Age, in that they had more pages than most of their contemporaries and usually featured five or six independent stories, with all the main characters coming together for the final story of the issue, a common Golden Age plotting device used in team books such as DC Comics's All-Star Comics.

== History ==
Tower publisher Harry Shorten "cut a dream deal with Wally Wood" in which Shorten would be the managing editor and "Wood would be granted a wide latitude of creative and business freedom devoid of a 9-to-5 office job or hefty administrative duties, and be allowed to concentrate on creating characters and concepts for an expanding line of superhero comics".

When it became obvious Wood could not handle the volume of material Shorten wanted to publish, he hired Samm Schwartz, who Shorten knew from both men's many years at Archie Comics. Schwartz handled the scheduling of all the material and assignments of scripts and art other than Wood's own. Schwartz's Tippy Teen, an Archie-style comic about the adventures of a spunky teenaged girl, ran 27 issues. Tippy Teen and its spin-off, Go-Go and Animal, featured many stories drawn by Schwartz, as well as contributions from moonlighting Archie artists like Harry Lucey and Dan DeCarlo.

Other notable creators associated with Tower included Dan Adkins, Gil Kane, Reed Crandall, Steve Ditko, Richard Bassford, Len Brown, Steve Skeates, Larry Ivie, Bill Pearson, Russ Jones, Roger Brand, and Tim Battersby-Brent.

In 1968, Tower Publications itself was sold to Vanderbilt Tire & Rubber Company, who was also owner of a rival and dormant comic book publisher American Comics Group.

== Legacy ==
At some point in the early 1980s John Carbonaro purchased what he believed were the rights to the T.H.U.N.D.E.R. Agents and associated characters and published them in his JC Comics line. In 1984, Deluxe Comics launched their own line of new T.H.U.N.D.E.R. Agents stories, claiming the characters had fallen into the public domain. Carbonaro sued, and claimed that he was awarded full legal rights to the property. There is no known evidence to support this claim.

In the early 2000s DC began to reprint the original Tower stories as part of their DC Archive Editions, and in 2010 DC began publishing a new T.H.U.N.D.E.R. Agents series.

== Titles published ==
- Fight the Enemy (3 issues, Aug. 1966 – Mar. 1967) – war title
- T.H.U.N.D.E.R. Agents (20 issues, Nov. 1965 – Nov. 1969) – and spin-off titles:
  - Dynamo (4 issues, Aug. 1966 – June 1967)
  - NoMan (2 issues, Nov. 1966 – Mar. 1967)
  - Undersea Agent (6 issues, Jan. 1966 – Mar. 1967) – minimal ties with T.H.U.N.D.E.R. Agents
- Tippy Teen (26 issues, Nov. 1965 – Oct. 1969) – teen comics; includes the unnumbered Tippy Teen Special Collector's Edition (Nov. 1969); and spin-off titles:
  - Teen-in (4 issues, Summer 1968 – Fall 1969)
  - Tippy's Friends Go-go and Animal / Tippy's Friend Go-Go (15 issues, Aug. 1966 – Oct. 1969)

=== Paperback collections ===
- Dynamo, Man of High Camp (Tower Book 42–660) 1966 – reprints T.H.U.N.D.E.R. Agents #1
- NoMan, the Invisible THUNDER Agent (Tower Book 42-672) 1966 – reprints NoMan stories from T.H.U.N.D.E.R. Agents #2–5
- Menthor, the T.H.U.N.D.E.R. Agent with the Super Helmet (Tower Book 42-674) 1966 – reprints Menthor stories from T.H.U.N.D.E.R. Agents #2–5
- The Terrific Trio (Tower Book 42-687) 1966 – reprints stories T.H.U.N.D.E.R. Agents #2, 3, 6
