= Adam Dechanel =

British writer (born 1978)

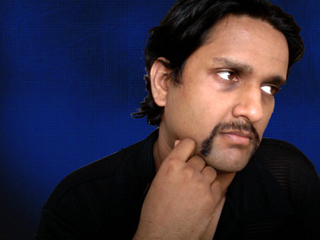
- Adam Dechanel
- Occupation(s): Writer, Artist, Producer

Adam Dechanel (born 1978 London) is a British author, illustrator, graphic designer and producer.

== Life ==
He has worked in television, film, books, short stories and graphic novels for many years. He graduated from Camberwell School of Art, and immediately began working in graphic design for Zomba Records and quickly followed on with work for the BBC and Channel 4. He has had a series of novels published including several based around DC Comics properties. Adam has also worked extensively over the years with Warner Bros., Marvel, DC Comics and The Walt Disney Company. He also exhibits his artwork in galleries around London, including the prestigious Old Truman Brewery. Adam has also been a journalist on comic, television and movie properties for the Superman Homepage for many years. Adam co-wrote the multiple path series: The Interactive Adventures Of Superman before writing and illustrating the novel Superman: Tempered Steel. Adam is a regular exhibitor at London based WAMCT Conventions.

In publishing, he is the co-creator along with noted producer/director Simon James Collier, of publishing label Okai Collier Kids that pioneered the flash animation based CDbook entertainment format which has gone on to publish over fourteen acclaimed novels and picture books for the digital generation.

His educational project concepts for the graphic novel anthologies, Vanston Place: The Secret Adventures & The Timber Wharves Gang earning him a nomination for a SNAC award. Adam's family novel The Legend Of Mauritius won him the prestigious Palace Leisure award.

In theatre, forging a partnership with Evcol entertainment, Adam has worked on hit shows such as Stephen Sondheim's "Passion, A… My Name Is Alice", and also spearheaded campaigns for the critically acclaimed European premieres of "Preacherosity" & the Hollywood legend Ossie Davis penned "Purlie: The Musical". He also wrote a standout script, "A Wrongful Execution", which was one of the headlining plays in the Inspiration, Innovation, Integration Season in Hackney Empire. "A Wrongful Execution" premiered the day of the July 7th London terrorist attacks dedicating itself to the memory of those lost that day.

In radio, Adam wrote and produced the audio adventure series 'Chip One' he also recorded the pilot for Education Of A Superhero - which proved so successful it also launched a series of cast diaries which were performed by West End veterans Omar F. Okai (Five Guys Named Moe, Ruthless, Purlie), Nathan Amzi (Rocky Horror Picture Show), Elise Audeyev (Mrs. Henderson Presents) and recording artist, Lisa Jayne.

Adam continues to write for comics, television and theatre.

In collaboration with Angelic Inspiration Entertainment he brought the novel (and inspiration for the Anthony Hopkins/Emma Thompson movie of the same name) The Remains Of The Day to the London stage this was followed shortly after by musical horror 1888.

In 2013 Adam adapted Rudyard Kipling classic The Jungle Book as an immersive family show that went back to the original books for The Lion & Unicorn Theatre. It won a Family Theatre Award. In 2014 Adam wrote a Gothic Trilogy reworkings of classic stories Frankenstein, The Corruption Of Dorian Gray and Jekyll & Hyde Corpus Delicti

2016 saw the launch of 'Welcome To The Planet' a weekly column on the world of comics & graphic novels in collaboration with Stefan Blitz and Forces Of Geek

== Works ==
- The Education Of A Superhero, Clockwork Comics, 2007, ISBN 978-1-901155-27-3
- The Gifted: The Beast Within, Clockwork Comics, 2007, ISBN 978-1-901155-22-8
- The Keeper (Special Edition) - ISBN 978-1-901155-20-4
- Norman Under The Sea - ISBN 978-1-901155-06-8
- George The Germ - ISBN 978-1-901155-08-2
- The Rise & Fall Of Georgina Germ - ISBN 978-1-901155-09-9
- Towards The Light Fantastic: The Fight For Freedom - ISBN 978-1-901155-10-5
- Towards The Light Fantastic: Journey To Jaipur - ISBN 978-1-901155-11-2
- The Mr Dark Chronicles: Book One - ISBN 978-1-901155-12-9
- The Mr Dark Chronicles: Book Two - ISBN 978-1-901155-13-6
- The Mr Dark Chronicles: Book Three - ISBN 978-1-901155-14-3
- The Mr Dark Chronicles Special Collector's Edition - ISBN 978-1-901155-15-0
- Countess & Cabbages - ISBN 978-1-901155-17-4
- Norman And The Homeless - ISBN 978-1-901155-18-1
- Norman And The Mystery Of Howling Woods - ISBN 978-1-901155-19-8
- Spooky Noises - ISBN 978-1-901155-16-7

== Interviews ==
- The Voice
- The Guardian
- My Village
- Comicbook Resources

== Awards and nominations ==
- Winner - London Horror Award for The Lion & Unicorn Gothic Trilogy
- Winner - Best Family Show 2013/14 - Family Theatre Award
- Winner - Best Original Children's Novel - Palace Leisure Award
- Winner - Pulse Award
- Nomination - Peter Brook/Equity Ensemble Award
- Nomination - SNAC awards
- Nomination - 123P Writer To Watch

== Television appearances ==
- Light Lunch - Channel 4
- The Museum - BBC Television
- Mortal Monday DC/Midway event - BBC Television
- Disney Choice Awards
- Smash Hits PWP
- MTV Play UK
