= Larry Ivie =

American expert in the field of comics (1936–2014)

- Born: 1936 Salt Lake City, Utah, U.S.
- Died: 2014 (aged 77–78)
- Areas: Writer, Penciller
- Notable works: T.H.U.N.D.E.R. Agents, Monsters and Heroes

Larry Ivie (1936–2014) was an American comics artist, writer, and collector who was active in comics fandom in the middle part of the 20th century, described by comics historian Bill Schelly as "the closest thing to an authority on comics that was available in the 1950s."

== Biography ==
Born in Salt Lake City, Utah, to biologist Wilton Ivie and his wife Aleen, he moved to New York City in the mid 1950s to attend the School of Visual Arts, and with a large personal library of comic books and correspondence via fanzines became a prominent part of New York comics fan culture. He also made amateur films of superheroes, influencing the amateur films of Donald F. Glut and appearing in two of his films.

He provided painted covers and other editorial material for early issues of Castle of Frankenstein magazine, then self-published the seven issues of his own newsstand magazine Monsters and Heroes, for which he drew comic stories of his own superhero Altron Boy, in the mid-to-late '60s; had his art published in the magazines Galaxy Science Fiction and If, co-created the comic book T.H.U.N.D.E.R. Agents, and wrote several stories for Marvel Comics and the horror magazines Creepy and Eerie.

Ivie died of lung cancer in January 2014, aged 77.
