= Judith Hunt =

Illustrator

- Judith Hunt in Maine, 2007
- Born: Washington
- Areas: Writer, Penciller
- Notable works: Evangeline

Judith A. Hunt is an American illustrator, painter, cartoonist, and designer, who has produced a diverse array of artwork for books, magazines, television, comics, videos, and toys. She has worked as an art director and staff illustrator/designer for magazine companies. As of 2018, she illustrates educational texts and children's books from her studio in Kennebunk, Maine, and showcases her fine art in local art shows.

Hunt's artwork has taken many twists and turns to adapt to the constantly changing demands of the commercial art market. She has done educational book development, children’s book illustration, book cover illustration, and magazine illustration. Her knowledge of botany and ecology has led her to illustrating botanical and wildlife conservation signs and posters for many conservation organizations, including the United States Forestry Service and the Maine Department of Conservation. Other work includes fantasy illustration, commercial licensed character picture book illustration, and video work for Andrew Gutelle's What's a Gonzo and Baby Kermit's Birthday Surprise. She created model sheets, templates, and character designs of Johnny Gruelle’s Raggedy Ann and Andy for Macmillan Publishing and the Highlights for Children characters, Timbertoes, and cartoon model books for characters appearing in Highlights for Children's "Funzone" and "Which Way USA" educational puzzle series.

== Biography ==
=== Comics ===
From 1980–1985, Hunt co-created and wrote cartoon and comic books with her then-husband, Chuck Dixon, including Evangeline and Winnie-the-Pooh word books, besides being the designer and illustrator on these projects. She also worked on Robotech Defenders with writer Andrew Helfer. In 1987 Hunt pencilled three issues of Conan the King, including an entire issue inked by Al Williamson; issues #3 and #4 of First Comics' Evangeline, and a few supplemental comics done for First Comics.

In addition, Hunt completed updated model sheets for Macmillan's Raggedy Ann and Andy, and illustrated many children books, including Henson Associates' What's a Gonzo and Baby Kermit's Birthday Surprise, and packaging design for toys.

=== Highlights for Children ===
In 1988 Hunt changed career paths, taking in-house employment with Honesdale, Pennsylvania-based Highlights for Children. Hunt worked primarily for Highlights for Children and Boyds Mills Press until 2000. She illustrated the Timbertoes comic strip (1992–2002) and worked as a puzzle designer for Highlights' "Puzzlemania", Hidden Picture books, and character designer and illustrator of "Which Way USA" and "Funzone" magazines.

=== 21st-century career ===
Hunt's more recently published work includes the children's picture book Prunes and Rupe by Lydia Griffin; the winner of the 2008 Annual CIPA Illustration Award, the educational nature book Animals Under Our Feet; and the historical pre-teen novels Susan Creek and Two Williams by Douglas Winter.

Hunt is the illustrator of the current online comic series, Evangeline, with the new issues being written by her son, Ben Dixon.

Current memberships and affiliations include the Society of Children's Book Writers and Illustrators, and serving on the board of The Maine Illustrators' Collective. Hunt's illustration work can be seen in Picturebook 2006, Picturebook 2008, and The Graphic Artists Guild's Directory of Illustration #24.

== Partial client list ==
- Filter Press- 2007 Prunes and Rupe
- Treasure Bay-2005 Animals Under Our Feet
- Zootles
- Disney
- Highlights for Children-1990-1994 Illustrations & character designer Puzzlemania, Funzone, Which Way USA, 1994-2002 Timbertoes strip cartoonist
- Western Publishing-1980-Raggedy Ann and Andy Go Flying
- U.S. Forestry Service
- State of Maine Dept. of Conservation
- Boyds Mill Press-1993-1995-Book cover & Illustration, 1997-The Timbertoes 123 & The Timbrertoes ABC
- Scholastic
- Random House
- Platt & Munk-1979 Three Little Kittens-Gingerbread Imprint
- Veritas Press-2000 Susan Creek, 2003 Two Williams, 2005 Up in the Sky, 2005 Bad Meg!
- EP Dutton- 1982 Winnie the Pooh's Adventures With Words 1984 Travels with Pooh
- Mattel
- Comics
  - DC Comics-Robotech Defenders
  - First Comics-1985-86 Evangeline, 1985 Jon Sable, Freelance
  - Marvel Comics- 1986 Conan the King
- Hallmark Cards-1985 Jammie Pies
- National Geographic
- Harcourt
- McGraw Hill
- Macmillan Publishing-1986 Raggedy Ann and Andy Licensing design 1988 Tim's Big Adventure
- The Jim Henson Company-1986-Baby Kermit's Birthday Surprise, "What's A Gonzo?" Illustration & Video
