= Ricardo Villagrán =

Argentine illustrator (born 1938)

- Born: 1938 (age 87–88) Corrientes, Argentina
- Areas: Penciller, Inker

Ricardo Villagran (born 1938) is an Argentine illustrator known for his work in the American comic book industry.

== Biography ==
=== Early life and education ===
Villagran was born in the small northern city of Corrientes in 1938. Since drawing has been his all-consuming interest from the age of four, it was considered reasonable for him to attend Escuela Nacional de Bellas Artes in Buenos Aires after high school. Villagran began taking freelance art assignments for various advertising companies, printers and comic publishers while still attending college. He even continued to do art assignments during his compulsory service in the Argentine Army.

=== Commercial illustration ===
After his discharge from the military, Villagran began working as a commercial artist and illustrator. His list of clients grew to include the majority of the larger advertising agencies and printing houses in Argentina. In 1969, Villagran began doing comic art for Editorial Columba (Buenos Aires, Rio de Janeiro, Lima, Caracas, Asunción, Montevideo, Santiago) Codex Ediciones, Guisa (Spain), Eura (Rome), and Fleetway (London).

Villagran was elected vice president of the Association de Dibujantes in 1970 and co-founded the Association de Illustradores. In 1974 Villagran opened his own art studio in Buenos Aires called Nippur Quatro, along with his two brothers Enrique and Carlos.

=== American comics ===
Villagran's interior artwork from Aquaman Sword of Atlantis vol. 3, #42 (March 2007).

In 1982, Villagran traveled to the United States, to establish contacts in the comics publishing industry to obtain work for his studio. His contacts brought him work from American comic publishers such as DC Comics, Marvel Comics, Archie Comics, Comico Comics, First Comics, and Dark Horse Comics. In 1983 he met Chuck Dixon at a convention, which brought Villagran to eventually ink the Evangeline comic. Villagran also acted as a liaison for other artists from his home country and introduced Dixon and illustrator/comic artist Judith Hunt to fellow Argentine Jorge Zaffino. Between 1984 and 1987 Villagran and his studio worked with Hunt on various comic and commercial art projects. He also joined her art studio, Off the Wall Studios, located in Media, Pennsylvania, for a short time. When Hunt discontinued illustrating comics and representing artists to pursue her own career in children's publishing and license character development, Villagran continued to work in American comics with Mike Manley, a former cartoonist employed by Off the Wall Studios.

=== Exhibitions ===
Villagran's work can be seen at many conventions in New York, Philadelphia, Chicago, San Diego, and Detroit. Exhibitions of his work have included Museo del Prado (Madrid), Municipal De Exhibiciones (Buenos Aires), Museo de Armas, and Secretaria de Turismo.
