= Dave Cockrum =

American comics artist (1943–2006)

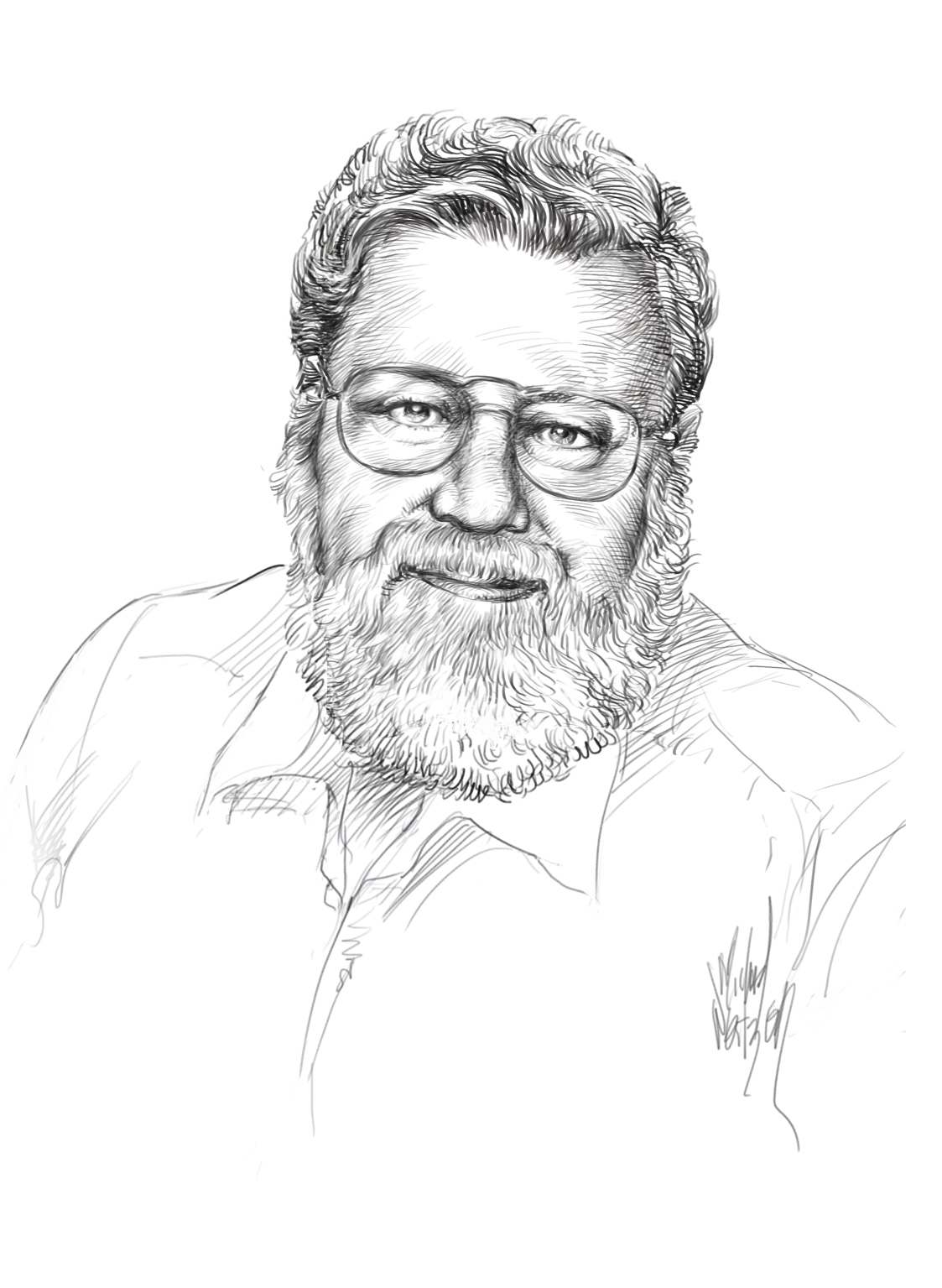
- Dave Cockrum by Michael Netzer
- Born: David Emmett Cockrum; November 11, 1943 Pendleton, Oregon, U.S.
- Died: November 26, 2006 (aged 63) Belton, South Carolina, U.S.
- Areas: Writer, Penciller, Inker
- Notable works: Legion of Super-Heroes; Uncanny X-Men
- Awards: Inkpot Award (1982)

David Emmett Cockrum (/ˈkɒkrəm/; November 11, 1943 – November 26, 2006) was an American comics artist known for his co-creation of the new X-Men characters Nightcrawler, Storm, Colossus, and Mystique, as well as the antiheroine Black Cat. Cockrum was a prolific and inventive costume designer who updated the uniforms of the Legion of Super-Heroes and the X-Men in the 1970s and early 1980s.

== Early life ==
Cockrum was born on November 11, 1943, in Pendleton, Oregon. His father was a lieutenant colonel of the United States Air Force, resulting in the Cockrums frequently transporting their household from one city to another for years. Cockrum discovered comic books at a young age; an early favorite was Fawcett's Captain Marvel, especially Mac Raboy's Captain Marvel Jr. Other artists whose work the young Cockrum admired were Wally Wood, Gil Kane, Murphy Anderson, and Joe Kubert.

As a young man, Cockrum was a dedicated "letterhack," who had many letters printed in comic book letter columns such as Fantastic Four #22 (Jan. 1964), The Amazing Spider-Man #12 (May 1964), The Atom #1 (June 1962), and Fantastic Four #36 (March 1965) (return address "YN 'A' School, USNTC"). A letter from Cockrum in Fantastic Four #34 (Jan. 1965) led to a correspondence with Andrea Kline, who later became his first wife.

Cockrum's ambition was to become a comic-book creator himself. After attending but not graduating from Southern Illinois University, Cockrum joined the United States Navy for six years. During this time, he created the character Nightcrawler, though the character would not be used until years later.

== Career ==
Despite serving during the Vietnam War, Cockrum found time to contribute artwork to comics fanzines such as Star-Studded Comics and Fantastic Fanzine.

After leaving the military, Cockrum found employment with Warren Publishing, as well as with Neal Adams' Continuity Associates as a member of the "Crusty Bunkers".

He was then hired as an assistant inker to Murphy Anderson, who was inking various titles featuring Superman and Superboy for DC Comics. At the time, Superboy featured a "Legion of Super-Heroes" backup strip. When the position of artist for "The Legion of Super-Heroes" was left vacant, Cockrum sought the job and was rewarded with his first assignment drawing a feature. Cockrum's work on the feature, beginning with a backup story in Superboy #184 (April 1972) and recurring in several following issues "established an exciting new vibe". He remained the artist on the Superboy series after the Legion of Super-Heroes became the main feature of the book with #197 and his art redefined the look of the Legion, creating new costumes and designs that would last until artist Keith Giffen did a similar revamp in the 1980s. Cockrum is credited with creating team member Wildfire. Cockrum drew the story wherein the characters Bouncing Boy and Duo Damsel were married in Superboy Starring the Legion of Super-Heroes #200 (Feb. 1974). Cockrum eventually left DC and the Legion in a dispute involving the return of his original artwork from that issue.

Prior to his departure, Cockrum had been preparing to be the regular artist on an ongoing Captain Marvel Jr. back-up strip in the Shazam! series for DC.

=== Marvel and the X-Men ===
Moving over to a staff position at Marvel, Cockrum and Len Wein under the direction of editor Roy Thomas created the new X-Men, co-creating such characters as Storm, Nightcrawler, and Colossus. Storm and Nightcrawler were directly based on characters which Cockrum had intended to introduce into the Legion of Super-Heroes storyline had he remained on the title. These characters made their debut in Giant-Size X-Men #1 ([July] 1975), and then in a relaunched Uncanny X-Men (beginning with issue #94).

Cockrum stayed with the title until 1977 (as main penciler on issues #94–105 and 107), when he was succeeded by penciler John Byrne with issue #108. The final issue of his original, regular run introduced the Starjammers, a spacefaring superhero team he had originally intended to debut in their own series. Issue #110, which Cockrum co-pencilled with Tony DeZuniga, was an inventory issue. He continued to contribute covers for the series until Uncanny X-Men #126.

Journalist Tom Spurgeon wrote about Cockrum's X-Men,

Cockrum's penciled interiors on those first few issues of the "new" X-Men were dark and appealingly dramatic...Cockrum gave those first few issues of X-Men a sumptuous, late-'70s cinema style that separated the book from the rest of Marvel's line, and superhero comics in general. Reading those X-Men comics felt like sneaking into a movie starring Sean Connery or Sigourney Weaver, not simply like flipping on the television. Uncanny X-Men really felt new and different, almost right away, and Cockrum's art was a tremendous part of that.

In 1979, Dave Cockrum designed Black Cat for writer Marv Wolfman. Cockrum quit his staff job at Marvel in 1979 and his angry resignation letter was printed without his permission in Iron Man #127 (October 1979) but he continued to work for Marvel as a freelancer. Cockrum was Marvel's primary cover artist during this period, and also penciled or inked a number of other titles for DC during this time. Although not a regular artist on the series, he re-designed the costume for Ms. Marvel. When John Byrne left the X-Men in 1981, Cockrum returned to the title with issue #145 but left again with issue #164 (Dec. 1982) to work on The Futurians.

He returned to the X-Universe in 1985 with a four-part Nightcrawler limited series that he wrote and inked as well and his wife Paty Cockrum (credited as just "Paty") colored, a two-part Starjammers limited series in 1990 and an X-Men short story for Marvel Holiday Special #1 in 1991. Two unpublished fill-in issues that Cockrum pencilled in the early 1990s for X-Men and New Mutants were released together posthumously as the one-shot X-Men: Odd Men Out in 2008.

=== The Futurians ===
In 1983, Cockrum produced The Futurians, first as a graphic novel (Marvel Graphic Novel #9), and then as an ongoing series published by Lodestone Comics. Though it did not last past issue #3, a collected edition was published by Eternity Comics in 1987 that included the "missing" issue #4. In 1995, Aardwolf Publishing printed the "missing" issue as Futurians #0, with a new five-page story by Cockrum and author Clifford Meth.

=== Claypool Comics ===
In 1993, Cockrum was recruited by Claypool Comics to produce work for them, resulting in several stories for Claypool's Elvira, Mistress of the Dark series beginning with #7. Cockrum was put into rotation on Peter David's Soulsearchers and Company, beginning with issue #13, becoming the series' penciler with #17 and penciling most issues through #44, published in 2000. Cockrum contributed a short feature to Richard Howell's Deadbeats #18.

== Personal life, illness, and death ==
While serving in the Navy in the late 1960s, Cockrum married Andrea Kline and had a child with her, Ivan Sean.

Dave and Paty Greer Cockrum were married on April 28, 1978.

In later years, Cockrum worked less frequently in comics. In 2004, he became seriously ill due to complications from diabetes and pneumonia, and a number of fellow artists and writers led by Clifford Meth and Neal Adams organized a fundraising project. The auction, run by Heritage Auctions at the WizardWorld Chicago show in August, raised over $25,000. Marvel eventually provided an undisclosed amount of financial support in exchange for Cockrum agreeing to terms protected by a nondisclosure agreement. Cockrum said publicly he was "very happy that so many people cared about my work and about me. ... I'm enormously grateful to Clifford Meth and Neal Adams for having moved this forward. ... I'm very happy with what everyone has done, including Marvel."

Cockrum was due to draw an eight-page story in Giant Size X-Men #3 (2005), but a recurrence of his health problems prevented this. Adams filled in.

Cockrum died at his home in Belton, South Carolina, on the morning of November 26, 2006, due to complications from diabetes. He was survived by his longtime wife, Paty Cockrum, and by his son and two stepchildren.

=== Legacy ===
The Joe Kubert School of Cartoon and Graphic Art bestowed the first annual Dave & Paty Cockrum Scholarship to a promising artist in 2008. The scholarship, which was organized by Clifford Meth, continues each year and is funded by sales of comics from Cockrum's personal collection.

In the novelization of X-Men: The Last Stand, written by Cockrum's longtime associate Chris Claremont (published in 2006), the President is named "David Cockrum". Claremont also created a character in homage to Cockrum in New Exiles who eventually "moved on" at the end of X-Men: Die by the Sword (2007), which ended with a full-page tribute to Cockrum.

== Awards ==
Cockrum's work on the X-Men earned the creative team an Eagle Award for Favourite (Colour) Comic in 1977. Cockrum received an individual Inkpot Award in 1982.

== Bibliography ==
Comics work (interior pencil art unless noted) includes:

=== Aardwolf Publishing ===
- Aardwolf #1–2 (1995)
- Futurians #0 (also writer) (1995)
- Heroes and Villains: The William Messner-Loebs Benefit Sketchbook (2005)
- The Three Tenors: Off Key (2005)
- The Uncanny Dave Cockrum... A Tribute (2004)

=== Broadway Comics ===
- Fatale #2 (1996)
- Shadow State #1–2 (1995)

=== Claypool Comics ===
- Elvira, Mistress of the Dark #7, 27–29, 39–43, 45–48 (1993–1997)
- Deadbeats #18 (1996)
- Soulsearchers and Company #13, 15, 17–22, 26, 28, 32–35, 37–38, 40, 42–44 (1995–2000)

=== DC Comics ===
- Batman #246, 410–412, 423 (1972, 1987–1988)
- Blackhawk #254–255 (1983)
- The Brave and the Bold #167 (Batman and Blackhawk) (1980)
- Green Lantern vol. 2 #128, 177 (1980–1981)
- Green Lantern vol. 3 #43 (inks) (1993)
- Green Lantern Corps Quarterly #3 (1992)
- Justice League America Annual #6 (1992)
- Justice League Quarterly #9, 11 (1992–1993)
- Legion of Super-Heroes vol. 2 #300 (among other artists) (1983)
- Legion of Super-Heroes vol. 3 #45 (1988)
- The Legion #25 (among other artists) (2003)
- Secret Origins vol. 2 #42, Annual #3 (1989)
- Shazam! #9 (1974)
- Sovereign Seven #19–23 (1997)
- Star Trek Annual #1 (co-plotter with Mike W. Barr and Marv Wolfman) (1985)
- Star Trek vol. 2 #24 (pin-up) (1989)
- Superboy #184, 188, 190–191, 193, 195, 197–202 (Legion of Super-Heroes) (1972–1974)
- Superman #248, 264 (full art); #260 (inks over Bob Brown); #272 (Graffiti Game) (1972–1974)
- Teen Titans #41 (inks over Bob Brown) (1972)
- Vigilante #44 (1987)
- Weird War Tales #99 (1981)
- Who's Who in the Legion of Super-Heroes #1–3 (1988)
- Who's Who: The Definitive Directory of the DC Universe #2, 4, 7, 13, 25 (1985–1987)
- Wonder Woman Annual #5 (1996)
- Wonder Woman Secret Files and Origins #1 (1998)
- World's Finest Comics #218 (inks over Dick Dillin) (1973)

=== Defiant Comics ===
- Dark Dominion #10 (inks over John Ridgway) (1994)
- Grimmax #0 (1994)
- Warriors of Plasm: Home for the Holidays graphic novel (1993)

=== Deluxe Comics ===
- Wally Wood's T.H.U.N.D.E.R. Agents #1–3 (#1 also inks over George Perez, #3 also writer) (1984–1985)

=== Harris Comics ===
- Creepy: The Limited Series #2 (1992)
- Vampirella's Summer Nights oneshot (1992)

=== Lodestone Comics ===
- Futurians #1–3 (also writer) (1985–1986)

=== Malibu Comics ===
- Prime #19 (1995)

=== Marvel Comics ===
- The Avengers #106 (inks over Rich Buckler and George Tuska); #107 (inks over Jim Starlin and George Tuska); #108 (inks over Don Heck); #124–125 (inks over John Buscema); #126 (inks over Bob Brown); Giant-Size #2–3 (1972–1975)
- Bizarre Adventures #27 (1981)
- Captain Marvel #26 (inks over Jim Starlin) (1973)
- Defenders #50 (with Keith Giffen), #53 (with Keith Giffen and Michael Golden), #57 (with George Tuska) (1977–1978)
- Destroyer #4 (1992)
- Doctor Who #2 (1984)
- Giant-Size X-Men #1 (1975)
- Howard the Duck #16 (1977)
- G.I. Joe Special Missions #22, 24 (1989)
- John Carter of Mars #11 (full art); #1 (inks over Gil Kane) (1977–1978)
- Legion of Monsters #1 (1975)
- Marvel Comics Presents #1–8 (inks over Tom Grindberg); #10 (inks over Steve Ditko); #32 (inks over Don Heck), #22–23, 41 (penciller), #73, 76 (artist), #75 (writer/penciller) (1988–1991)
- Marvel Fanfare #3, 16–17 (1982, 1984)
- Marvel Graphic Novel (The Futurians) #9 (also writer) (1983)
- Marvel Holiday Special (X-Men) #1 (1991)
- Marvel Preview #1 (1975)
- Monsters Unleashed #4 (1974)
- Ms. Marvel #20–21 (1978)
- Nightcrawler #1–4 (also writer and inker) (1985–1986)
- Official Handbook of the Marvel Universe #1–5, 8, 10, 12–14 (1983–1984)
- Official Handbook of the Marvel Universe Deluxe Edition #1–4, 6, 7, 9, 12, 14, 18, 20 (1985–1988)
- Official Handbook of the Marvel Universe Update '89 #4 (1989)
- Pizzazz #14–16 (Star Wars comic) (1978–1979)
- Power Pack #60 (inks over Tom Morgan) (1990)
- Punisher: Bloodlines (1991)
- Savage Sword of Conan #188 (1991)
- Sensational She-Hulk #54 (inks over Pat Olliffe) (1993)
- Silver Surfer #13 (inks over Joe Staton); #21 (inks over Marshall Rogers) (1988–1989)
- Solo Avengers #17 (Namor) (1989)
- Special Edition X-Men #1 (1983)
- Star Trek #1–6, 8–10 (1980–1981)
- Uncanny X-Men #94–107 (#106 with Bob Brown), #110 (with Tony DeZuniga), #145–150, 153–158, 161–164 (1975–1978, 1981–1982)
- X-Men: Odd Men Out #1 (2008)
- X-Men Spotlight on... Starjammers #1–2 (1990)
- What If? #38 (1983)

==== Marvel UK ====
- Star Wars Weekly #60 (1979)

=== Valiant Comics ===
- Harbinger Files #1 (1994)
- Turok, Dinosaur Hunter Yearbook #1 (1994)

=== Warren Publishing ===
- Creepy #39, 40 (also writer), #42 (1971)
- Eerie #36 (1971)
- Vampirella #11 (1971)

Preceded by George Tuska	Superboy and the Legion of Super-Heroes artist 1972–1974	Succeeded by Mike Grell
Preceded by Sal Buscema (in 1970)	Uncanny X-Men artist 1975–1977	Succeeded by John Byrne
Preceded by John Byrne	Uncanny X-Men artist 1981–1982	Succeeded by Paul Smith
