= T.H.U.N.D.E.R. Agents =

Superhero team

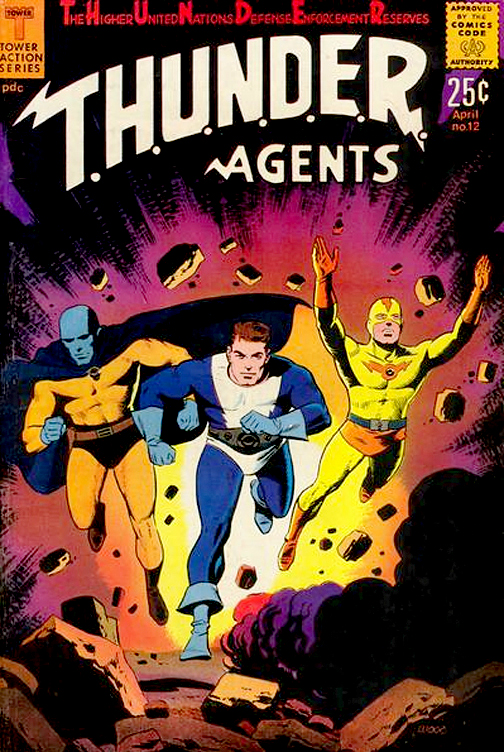
- T.H.U.N.D.E.R. Agents #12 (Tower Comics, April 1967), art by Wallace Wood

Publication information
- Publisher: Tower Comics; JC Comics; Deluxe Comics; DC Comics; IDW Publications
- Schedule: Bimonthly
- Publication date: (Tower); November 1965 – November 1969 (JC); May 1983 – January 1984 (Deluxe); November 1984 – October 1986 (DC); January 2011 – June 2012 (IDW); August 2013 – April 2014
- No. of issues: (Tower); 20 (JC); 2 (Deluxe); 5 (DC) (vol. 1) 10 (vol. 2) 6 (IDW); 8
- Main character(s): Dynamo; Lightning; Menthor; No-Man; James "Egghead" Andor; Dynamite; Kathryn "Kitten" Kane; William "Weed" Wylie; Raven; Undersea Agent; Vulcan

Creative team
- Written by: Len Brown; Larry Ivie; Bill Pearson; Steve Skeates; Nick Spencer
- Artist(s): Wallace Wood; Dan Adkins; Gil Kane; Steve Ditko; Paul Reinman; Mike Sekowsky; Chic Stone; Manny Stallman

T.H.U.N.D.E.R. Agents is a fictional team of superheroes that appeared in comic books originally published by Tower Comics in the 1960s. They were an arm of the United Nations and were notable for their depiction of the heroes as everyday people whose heroic careers were merely their day jobs. The series was also notable for featuring some of the better artists of the day, such as Wallace Wood and Gil Kane. The team first appeared in T.H.U.N.D.E.R. Agents #1 (cover-dated Nov. 1965). The team name is an acronym for The Higher United Nations Defense Enforcement Reserves. The team has appeared in several versions via several publishers since the early 1980s.

== Publication history ==
=== Tower Comics ===
T.H.U.N.D.E.R. Agents was a bimonthly comic book published by Tower Comics. It ran for 20 issues (Nov. 1965 – Nov. 1969), plus two short-lived spin-off series starring the most popular super agents (Dynamo and No-Man). To launch the project, Wallace Wood huddled with scripter Len Brown (and possibly Larry Ivie) on a superhero concept Brown had described to Wood a year earlier. Brown recalled: "Wally had remembered my concept and asked me to write a 12-page origin story. I submitted a Captain Thunderbolt story in which he fought a villain named Dynamo." With a few changes by Wood and a title obviously inspired by the success of the spy-fi television series The Man from U.N.C.L.E. and the then-current James Bond film Thunderball, the series got underway. Tower Comics went out of business in 1969, and the T.H.U.N.D.E.R. Agents went into limbo.

=== JC Comics ===
In 1981 the rights to T.H.U.N.D.E.R. Agents were bought by John Carbonaro, who published two issues of a new series in the early 1980s under his JC Comics line, the storyline of which concluded in Blue Ribbon Comics #12, published by Archie Comics' Red Circle Comics line.

=== L. Miller & Son, Ltd. ===
Meanwhile, in the UK, L. Miller & Son, Ltd., and some of its successors published large monthly compendiums of uncolored American superhero comics up until the 1980s, often reproducing T.H.U.N.D.E.R. Agents material.

=== Texas Comics ===
In 1983, the T.H.U.N.D.E.R. Agents appeared in Texas Comics' Justice Machine Annual #1, written by William Messner-Loebs, with art by Bill Reinhold, Jeff Dee, and Bill Anderson.

=== Deluxe Comics ===
In 1984, David M. Singer's Deluxe Comics began publishing a new series, Wally Wood's T.H.U.N.D.E.R. Agents, featuring some of the best artists of the era, including George Pérez, Dave Cockrum, Keith Giffen, Murphy Anderson, Steve Ditko, Rich Buckler, and Jerry Ordway. Singer claimed that the group was in the public domain. A lawsuit by Carbonaro claimed otherwise. The lawsuit was eventually decided in U.S. District Court in favor of Carbonaro, with Singer acknowledging Carbonaro's registered copyrights and trademark. Under the decision, Carbonaro also received, among other things, an assignment of all rights to Wally Wood's T.H.U.N.D.E.R. Agents, and an undisclosed sum of money. Deluxe Comics closed its doors in 1986 when several major distributors failed to pay sizeable past-due invoices.

=== Solson Publications ===
In 1987, Solson Publications produced one issue of T.H.U.N.D.E.R., a planned four-issue miniseries which was never completed. A second issue was almost finished. This series was not set in the same universe as the original series and took the characters in a different direction.

=== 1990s ===
In the early 1990s, Rob Liefeld stated that he had the rights to publish T.H.U.N.D.E.R. Agents, and advanced Dave Cockrum money to illustrate the series through Liefeld's Extreme Studios. Ads for a T.H.U.N.D.E.R. Agents series appeared in Extreme Studios and Maximum Press books cover-dated February 1996, indicating that the series would feature "stories by Rob Liefeld, Jim Valentino, Stephen Platt, Chap Yaep and Dan Fraga".

Another revival was attempted by John Carbonaro in Penthouse Comix's Omni Comix #3 (1995).

A revival was attempted by Harvey Comics' Nemesis Comics imprint in the 1990s, but the Nemesis Comics imprint was shuttered as well.

=== 21st century ===
Promotional art for the 2010 revamp by Frank Quitely

In the early 2000s, DC Comics planned to release a new T.H.U.N.D.E.R. Agents series under license from Carbonaro. Work for about two issues of a new series was completed, but Carbonaro put a stop to it as it made radical alterations to the characters. DC failed to create a series in line with the original series and tone, but began publishing reprints of the original Tower series in their hardcover DC Archive Editions format in a total of six volumes. After Carbonaro died in early 2009, DC acquired the rights from his estate the same year. At that point, T.H.U.N.D.E.R. Agents was planned to be brought into the DC Universe, as DC had recently done with the Milestone Media and MLJ Comics heroes.

A new series began publishing in November 2010 with a creative team of writer Nick Spencer and artist CAFU. The team consists of the original NoMan and a team of new heroes wearing the classic T.H.U.N.D.E.R. Agents costumes. In a departure from the classic series, the new Lightning is African. The series lasted 10 issues. In late 2011, DC published a six-issue miniseries.

In 2012, the rights to produce a T.H.U.N.D.E.R. Agents comic book series were granted to IDW Publishing. This publication lasted eight issues, after which rights were reverted in 2017.

== Fictional team history ==
The first issue introduced the first three T.H.U.N.D.E.R. Agents: Dynamo, No-Man and Menthor. United Nations soldiers storm a mountain laboratory of a UN scientist, Professor Emil Jennings, driving off the forces of the Warlord. The scientist dies, but leaves behind several inventions — super weapons to combat the Warlord's worldwide attacks. Leonard Brown is given the Thunder Belt, which makes him super strong and invulnerable for a short amount of time, and is code-named Dynamo. Dying scientist Anthony Dunn transfers his mind into an android body of his own design. With a wide number of identical bodies, he can transfer his mind to any of them should something happen to his current one. He is given an invisibility cloak and becomes No-Man. John Janus gains mental powers from the Menthor Helmet. He is a double agent for the Warlord, but when he wears the helmet, he turns good. Joining these super agents is the T.H.U.N.D.E.R. Squad, a special team of agents who fight the Warlord. This team included Virgil "Guy" Gilbert, Dynamite (Daniel John Adkins), William "Weed" Wylie, Kathryn "Kitten" Kane, and James "Egghead" Andor.

In subsequent issues, additional agents were added. Gilbert of the T.H.U.N.D.E.R. Squad is given the Lightning Suit and becomes a super agent in issue #4. In issue #2, the Warlord is revealed as a Subterranean, and his forces are humanoids who live under the surface and have engaged in a war to reclaim the surface world from humans. Also in this issue, "Egghead" is killed in action but later reappears as a villain in an issue of Wally Wood's T.H.U.N.D.E.R. Agents. In issue #7, Menthor is killed. In issue #8, Craig Lawson is given an experimental rocket pack and becomes the Raven, and the Subterraneans are defeated. Later post-Tower additions included sonic-powered agent Vulcan (Travis F. Riley), two different Undersea Agents (Lt. David "Davy" Jones and his daughter, Theresa) and two later versions of "new" agents who wore the Menthor helmet.

With the threat of the Subterraneans ended, new villains appeared in the original series. Issue #9 introduced S.P.I.D.E.R. (Secret People's International Directorate for Extralegal Revenue), the main villains for the rest of the series. Other menaces included the Iron Maiden, an armored mastermind (introduced in issue #1 as a possible love interest for Dynamo) who worked for the Subterraneans; Andor, a fast-healing telekinetic superhuman created by the Subterraneans who was introduced in Dynamo #1; along with Red Star (a Communist menace) and others.

In the 2010 DC Comics series, S.P.I.D.E.R. kidnaps the Raven and kills Dynamo and Lightning. New versions of Lightning and Dynamo are recruited, and the original No-Man, who had left the team because he was losing his humanity, was replaced. By this time, a number of people had been behind the costume of each T.H.U.N.D.E.R. Agent, since the devices that gave them their powers are eventually fatal.

Also introduced are T.H.U.N.D.E.R.'s recruiters, field agent Colleen Franklin and salesman Toby Heston. In the assault on S.P.I.D.E.R. to rescue the Raven, Toby is revealed as the brother of S.P.I.D.E.R.'s new leader, given a false personality to infiltrate T.H.U.N.D.E.R. When he attempts to use the Menthor helmet to gain the Raven's secrets however, he regains the "Toby" personality, similar to the effect that it had on Janus.

Colleen is revealed to be the daughter of Len Brown, the original Dynamo and the Iron Maiden. They live quietly in Sydney, Australia, but the T.H.U.N.D.E.R. Squad raid their home and capture the family. Brown wears the Dynamo belt one last time in exchange for his daughter and the Iron Maiden's life and apparently dies during the mission. The Iron Maiden escapes T.H.U.N.D.E.R.'s custody, leaving Colleen to be raised by T.H.U.N.D.E.R. Years later, Colleen tracks down the Iron Maiden and after extracting information from her with the help of Toby Heston, leaves her to be killed by the daughter of one of her former victims.

Soon the Subterraneans, who were defeated back in the early 1970s, start an uprising led by Demo. It was the existence of the Subterraneans that led to the establishment of the Higher United Nations and T.H.U.N.D.E.R. The new Dynamo is killed and a new Raven is introduced. In a backup series, a new UNDERSEA Agent is introduced.

== Members ==
=== Agents ===
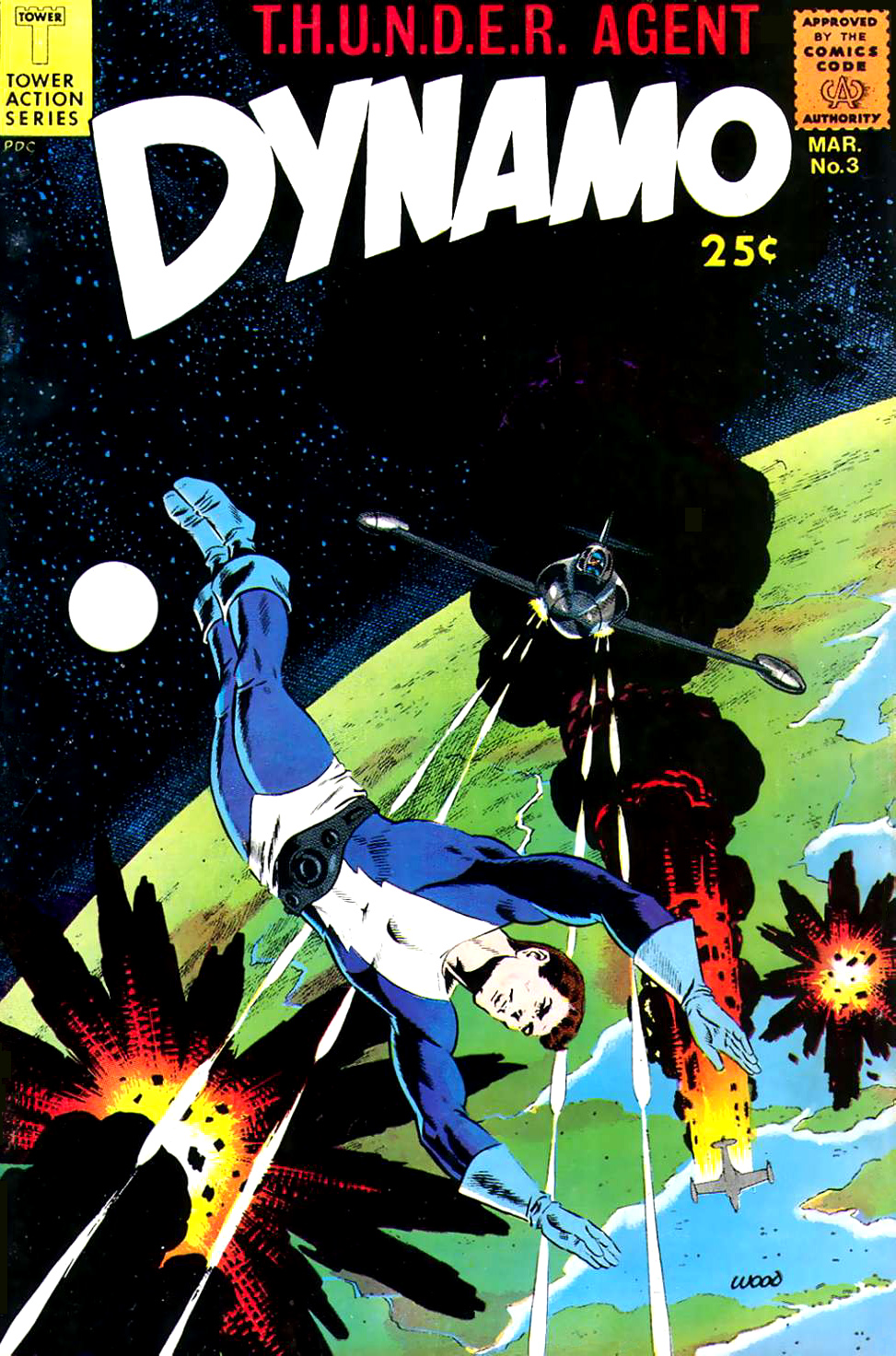
Wally Wood cover for Dynamo #3 (March 1967)

- Dynamo – Leonard Brown wears the Thunder Belt, which makes him super-strong and invulnerable for 30 minutes. Going past the time limit puts a great strain on his body. Due to this, a safety measure was implemented in the belt that causes it to automatically turn off after 30 minutes.
- Menthor – John Janus gains mental powers from the Menthor Helmet. Actually a double agent for the Warlord, when he wears the helmet, he turns good. After Janus dies in issue #7, two later agents wear the Menthor Helmet.
- No-Man – dying scientist Anthony Dunn transfers his mind into an android body of his own design. With a wide number of these identical bodies, he can transfer his mind to any of them should something happen to the one that he is in. The addition of an Invisibility Cloak completes the transformation into No-Man. However, he can only use the cloak for 10 minutes, as it drains his body's batteries.
- Lightning – Virgil "Guy" Gilbert wears the Lightning Suit, which gives him super-speed but also ages him at an accelerated rate.
- Raven – Craig Lawson wears an experimental rocket pack, and possesses superhuman vision and hearing.
- Undersea Agent – Lt. David "Davy" Jones and his daughter Theresa both wear the suit.
- Vulcan – Travis F. Riley is a sonic-powered agent.

=== The T.H.U.N.D.E.R. Squad ===
- James "Egghead" Andor – a brilliant strategist. Andor dies in issue #2, reappearing as a villain in later issues.
- Dynamite – Daniel John Adkins is the "weapons man".
- Kathryn "Kitten" Kane – technical device expert.
- William "Weed" Wylie – locksmith and safecracker.
- Colleen Franklin – T.H.U.N.D.E.R. Agent recruiter, later revealed to be the daughter of Len Brown (a.k.a. Dynamo).
- Toby Heston – salesman and T.H.U.N.D.E.R. Agent recruiter, he is actually the brother of S.P.I.D.E.R.'s new leader.

== Film adaptation ==
In 2015, the film adaptation was announced to be produced by China's Huayi Brothers Media, with Batman producer Michael Uslan to launch a franchise based on the comic book series.

== Collected editions ==
=== T.H.U.N.D.E.R. Agents original series reprints ===
T.H.U.N.D.E.R. Agents Archives, Vol. 1–7, DC Comics, 2002–2011:

- T.H.U.N.D.E.R. Agents Archives Vol. 1 (reprints T.H.U.N.D.E.R. Agents #1–4), December 2002, ISBN 1-56389-903-5
- T.H.U.N.D.E.R. Agents Archives Vol. 2 (reprints T.H.U.N.D.E.R. Agents #5–7; Dynamo #1), June 2003, ISBN 1-56389-970-1
- T.H.U.N.D.E.R. Agents Archives Vol. 3 (reprints T.H.U.N.D.E.R. Agents #8–10; Dynamo #2), March 2004, ISBN 1-4012-0015-X
- T.H.U.N.D.E.R. Agents Archives Vol. 4 (reprints T.H.U.N.D.E.R. Agents #11; No-Man #1–2; Dynamo #3), June 2005, ISBN 1-4012-0152-0
- T.H.U.N.D.E.R. Agents Archives Vol. 5 (reprints T.H.U.N.D.E.R. Agents #12–14; Dynamo #4), 2005, ISBN 1-4012-0164-4
- T.H.U.N.D.E.R. Agents Archives Vol. 6 (reprints T.H.U.N.D.E.R. Agents #15–20; plus covers of four Undersea Agent issues), February 2006, ISBN 1-4012-0416-3
- T.H.U.N.D.E.R. Agents Archives Vol. 7 (reprints Deluxe Comics' Wally Wood's T.H.U.N.D.E.R. Agents #1–5 and a story from Omni Comix #3), July 2011, ISBN 1-4012-3148-9

T.H.U.N.D.E.R. Agents Classics Vol. 1–6, IDW Publishing, 2013–2015:

- T.H.U.N.D.E.R. Agents Classics Vol. 1 (reprints T.H.U.N.D.E.R. Agents # 1–4), August 2013
- T.H.U.N.D.E.R. Agents Classics Vol. 2 (reprints T.H.U.N.D.E.R. Agents # 5–7; Dynamo #1), December 2013
- T.H.U.N.D.E.R. Agents Classics Vol. 3 (reprints T.H.U.N.D.E.R. Agents #8–10; Dynamo #2), April 2014
- T.H.U.N.D.E.R. Agents Classics Vol. 4 (reprints T.H.U.N.D.E.R. Agents #11; No-Man #1–2; Dynamo #3), August 2014
- T.H.U.N.D.E.R. Agents Classics Vol. 5 (reprints T.H.U.N.D.E.R. Agents #12–14; Dynamo #4), March 2015
- T.H.U.N.D.E.R. Agents Classics Vol. 6 (reprints T.H.U.N.D.E.R. Agents #15–19), November 2015

=== T.H.U.N.D.E.R. Agents anthologies ===
- T.H.U.N.D.E.R. Agents: The Best of Wally Wood, IDW Publishing, Oct 2014 (hardcover; 148 pages)
- Wally Wood’s T.H.U.N.D.E.R. Agents: Artist’s Edition Portfolio, IDW Publishing, April 2016 (a selection of Wood's art, all scanned from the originals and printed at full size)

=== New series ===
- T.H.U.N.D.E.R. Agents Vol. 1 (reprints DC's T.H.U.N.D.E.R. Agents #1–10), November 2011, ISBN 1-4012-3254-X
