= Sabrina the Teenage Witch (1970 TV series) =

- Also known as: The Sabrina Comedy Hour; Sabrina and the Groovie Goolies; The Sabrina Comedy Show
- Genre: Comedy horror Fantasy; Slapstick; Supernatural
- Based on: Sabrina the Teenage Witch by: Dan DeCarlo, George Gladir, & Archie Comics
- Directed by: Hal Sutherland
- Voices of: Jane Webb; John Erwin; Dallas McKennon; Howard Morris; Don Messick; Larry D. Mann; Larry Storch
- Country of origin: United States
- No. of seasons: 1
- No. of episodes: 31 (two 11-minute segments per show)

Production
- Producers: Norm Prescott; Lou Scheimer
- Running time: 19-21 min. (DVD release)
- Production companies: Filmation Associates; The Sabrina Company

Original release
- Network: CBS; Syndicated
- Release: September 12, 1970 – August 31, 1974

Related
- Archie's Funhouse; The U.S. of Archie; Groovie Goolies

Sabrina the Teenage Witch (titled Sabrina and the Groovie Goolies or The Sabrina Comedy Hour and promotionally referred to as The Sabrina the Teenage Witch Show or The Sabrina Comedy Show) is an American animated television series produced by Filmation that aired on CBS during Saturday mornings from 1970 to 1974. The series has also aired in prime time as a syndicated series.

Based on Archie Comics' Sabrina the Teenage Witch, the show was a spin-off of The Archie Comedy Hour—featuring new episodes of Sabrina along with the Groovie Goolies. Writers at Archie Comics later stated they were "flabbergasted" that Filmation sought to cast Sabrina, then a minor (but rising) character in the Archie Comics fictional universe, as the lead role in an animated series.

According to Filmation co-founder Lou Scheimer, "We were always looking for concepts that already had an audience or proven interest, and I had actually been interested in doing Bewitched as an animated series. We met up with the guy who produced it, William Asher, who was married to the star, Elizabeth Montgomery, but he didn’t have the rights, so it didn’t work out. But then I got a call from Freddie Silverman, who was on vacation down in Mexico and had been looking through a stack of Archie comics. He said, “Did you know that your friend Goldwater already has a teenage witch character in the Archie books?” That was how we decided to do Sabrina.”

The series follows a teenage witch who likes to hang out with her friends at Riverdale High and fight enemies using her magical powers. She does not let her friends discover her secret. This series was aimed primarily towards young girls ages 6 to 14 and contained an adult laugh track. Following its first season, the series was reduced to a half-hour screen time when the Goolies were spun off into their own series.

Filmation animated Sabrina once more in 1977 with The New Archie and Sabrina Hour.

== Voices ==
- Jane Webb – Sabrina Spellman, Aunt Hilda, Aunt Zelda, Miss Della the Head Witch, Betty Cooper, Veronica Lodge, Miss Grundy, Big Ethel, Bella La Ghostly, additional voices
- Dallas McKennon – Salem, Archie Andrews, Hot Dog, Mr. Weatherbee, Pop Tate, Mr. Lodge, Coach Kleats, Ronnie, Clyde, Rover, Goo, additional voices
- Don Messick – Harvey Kinkle, Spencer, Chili Dog, additional voices
- Treva Frazee – Ophelia
- John Erwin – Cousin Ambrose (1969–1970), Hexter, Reggie Mantle, additional voices
- Howard Morris – Cousin Ambrose (1970–1971), Big Moose Mason, Jughead Jones, Hot Dog Jr., Frankie, Wolfie, Fido, Dr. Jekyll and Hyde, Mummy, Hauntleroy, Orville, additional voices
- Larry D. Mann – Boneapart, additional voices
- Larry Storch – Drac, Hagatha, Ghoulihand, Batso, Ratso, Icky, additional voices

== Episodes ==
=== The Archie Comedy Hour (1969–1970) ===
No.	Title	Original release date
1a	"The Fairy Godmother"	September 13, 1969
Sabrina uses her magic to get Spencer to go to the school dance with Ophelia.
1b	"Hiccups"	September 13, 1969
Sabrina has the hiccups, which causes her magic to go out of control.
2a	"Which Witch is Which?"	September 20, 1969
After a magical mishap, Aunt Hilda's face turns into that of Sabrina's.
2b	"The Basketball Game"	September 20, 1969
It is a basketball game between Riverdale High and Crosstown High, and when Crosstown High is cheating, Sabrina tries to counter them.
3a	"Will the Real Weatherbee Stand Up?"	September 27, 1969
When the school is undermanned, Sabrina conjures up copies of Mr. Weatherbee to help.
3b	"Caveman"	September 27, 1969
Cousin Ambrose, hoping to help Sabrina with her Ancient History class homework, accidentally brings a caveman named Ug (voiced by Dallas McKennon) from prehistoric times to Riverdale.
4a	"Paint Story"	October 4, 1969
Sabrina helps Archie and the others paint Mr. Weatherbee's house.
4b	"Aunt Zelda's Broom"	October 4, 1969
Sabrina tries to bring Aunt Zelda's broom for a race in the other world.
5a	"Cinderella Story"	October 11, 1969
Sabrina and her friends enjoy the costume ball, but when it is 9:00 PM on Demon's Eve, you can bet Sabrina's magic will go into disarray!
5b	"What the Hex Going On?"	October 11, 1969
Aunt Hilda casts a hex on Jughead after he makes a derogatory remark regarding witches.
6a	"Wishbone"	October 18, 1969
Hot Dog Jr. and Chili Dog come across a magic soup bone that can grant wishes.
6b	"Babysitter"	October 18, 1969
Sabrina is tasked with watching over Miss Della's mischievous nephew, Hexter.
7a	"Carnival"	October 25, 1969
Sabrina enjoys her time at the carnival, but when the Versa-Vicea Comet is in the sky, everything a witch says or does will go backwards!
7b	"Stage Fright"	October 25, 1969
Aunt Hilda plays the role of a witch in a stage play.
8a	"Pet Show"	November 1, 1969
Sabrina enters Salem in a pet show; however, whenever the planet Catastrophe is in the Big Dipper, it causes all witches' cats to be uncontrollable...and worse, when Mr. Weatherbee's mynah bird Humphrey (voiced by John Erwin) finds out that Sabrina is a witch...
8b	"Funny Bunny"	November 1, 1969
Sabrina uses her magic to help Jughead to be successful, but it causes him to become a rabbit!
9a	"Hair Today, Gone Tomorrow"	November 8, 1969
Sabrina uses her magic to produce a hair elixir to make Mr. Weatherbee change his opinion about people with long hair.
9b	"A Witch in Time"	November 8, 1969
When Aunt Hilda and Aunt Zelda are deemed too human-like to be Sabrina's guardians, Miss Della tasks another witch named Nagatha (voiced by Jane Webb) to watch over Sabrina.
10a	"When the Cat's Away"	November 15, 1969
Sabrina trades places with Salem.
10b	"Costume Party"	November 15, 1969
Sabrina and her friends have a costume party at a dilapidated house, but when Sabrina realizes it is also the locale for the Witches' Convention...
11a	"Let's Have a Hand for Jughead"	November 22, 1969
Sabrina aids Big Ethel in making Jughead fall for her.
11b	"The New Freeway"	November 22, 1969
Sabrina helps her aunts try to stop the construction of a freeway, or their house will be demolished.
12a	"Blue Whale"	November 29, 1969
Sabrina brings Hexter to the aquarium; once there, Hexter encounters Hugh the Blue Whale (voiced by Howard Morris), who is homesick.
12b	"Football Game"	November 29, 1969
Aunt Hilda comes to a high school football game and unknowingly helps the Central City Dragons in the game against the Riverdale Knights.
13a	"Town Beautiful"	December 6, 1969
Sabrina and the others clean the town of Riverdale to win the statewide Town Beautiful contest, but two bikers known as the Crosstown High Boys are ruining their chances...
13b	"Horse's Mouth"	December 6, 1969
To remove the ordinance of forbidding horse labor, Sabrina grants a horse (voiced by Dallas McKennon) to speak human language, but...
14a	"Birdman of Riverdale"	December 13, 1969
Sabrina and her friends realize that a grumpy old man is not really all that he seems to be when Sabrina finds out that the old man is a lover of birds.
14b	"Hoedown Showdown"	December 13, 1969
Sabrina and her friends pitch in to help Moose's uncle with the harvest, so that he does not lose his farm.
15a	"Spooky Spokes"	December 20, 1969
When Sabrina cleans Cousin Ambrose's home and accidentally gives away his cousin's motorcycle, she tries to get it back.
15b	"You Oughta Be in Pictures"	December 20, 1969
Sabrina helps the others arrange a movie.
16a	"The Generation Flap"	December 27, 1969
Sabrina arranges a party for Archie's birthday; however, what she did not count on was that her aunts also arranged a magic seminar, where all the leading witches and warlocks will be there.
16b	"School Daze"	December 27, 1969
Sabrina is told to watch over Hexter again; only this time, Hexter goes to Sabrina's school after shrinking her down to doll size.
17a	"Ug at the Bat"	January 3, 1970
Aunt Hilda has Sabrina bring Ug to school, but to her surprise Ug is a natural, batting home runs for the Riverdale High baseball team!
17b	"Computerized Moose"	January 3, 1970
After a mishap with the school super-computer, Moose becomes super-intelligent.

=== Sabrina and the Groovie Goolies (1970–1971) ===
No.	Title	Original release date
1a	"Short Changed"	September 12, 1970
Reggie visits Sabrina's house.
1b	"Rose-Colored Glasses"	September 12, 1970
When Mr. Weatherbee winds up with Aunt Hilda’s rose-colored glasses, it is up to the Goolies to get them back.
2a	"Mis-Guided Tour"	September 19, 1970
Hexter forces Sabrina to take him to the Riverdale Museum.
2b	"Living Dolls"	September 19, 1970
Strange things begin to happen when Aunt Hilda shrinks the Goolies down to doll size, and complications ensue when Sabrina’s friends encounter these living dolls.
3a	"That Old Track Magic"	September 26, 1970
Cousin Ambrose goes to the track and field meet and unknowingly causes more harm than good to the chances of Riverdale High defeating Crosstown High.
3b	"Cake Bake"	September 26, 1970
When Hauntleroy catches wind of a cake-baking contest, he stirs up competition between Hagatha and Aunt Hilda.
4a	"Moose's Alter-Falter"	October 3, 1970
Sabrina uses her magic to give Moose a good personality, but not only does it bring it out of his body, it also brings out his evil personality!
4b	"Hot Rod Derby"	October 3, 1970
When Wolfie decides to compete in Riverdale’s car race, Sabrina gets caught in the middle.
5a	"Mortal Terror"	October 10, 1970
After Sabrina wishes that she never was a witch, Miss Della grants her wish, but she soon learns that a mortal's life is not all that it is cracked up to be...
5b	"The Bear Facts"	October 10, 1970
Riverdale High’s photography class visits the forest just as the Goolies arrive for their own field trip.
6a	"Weather or Not"	October 17, 1970
Sabrina suffers from the Hong Kong Fluke, which makes the victim's magic become weather-based.
6b	"Child Care"	October 17, 1970
While babysitting Ratso, Batso and Hauntleroy, Sabrina conjures up Dimples the Dragon (voiced by Larry D. Mann) out of a storybook, but the creature gets loose and finds its way into Riverdale.
7a	"Flying Sorcery"	October 24, 1970
Sabrina's secret is under threat when Reggie sees her coming out of a flying saucer.
7b	"Witches Golf Open"	October 24, 1970
Sabrina ropes the Archie gang into caddying for the Goolies during a midnight golf tournament.
8a	"Too Many Cooks"	October 31, 1970
Archie and Reggie make a bet to see who can last the longest inside Grisly Manor, but it is also the site of the 400th Annual Witches' Ghostly Gourmet Gathering!
8b	"Rummage Sale"	October 31, 1970
When the Goolies make a donation to the Riverdale High rummage sale, it causes problems for Sabrina and incites suspicion in Reggie.
9a	"Ambrose's Amulet"	November 7, 1970
Cousin Ambrose lets Sabrina borrow an amulet to help Big Ethyl get Jughead's attention. but she did not count on the amulet having an unusual power to turn anyone of the wearer's choice into a certain animal.
9b	"High School Drop-Ins"	November 7, 1970
Frankie, Wolfie and Mummy decide to take some classes at Riverdale High.
10a	"Auto-Biography"	November 14, 1970
After a failed attempt to hex Archie's car, Aunt Hilda gets hexed herself. As a result, she is inside Archie's car on the day of a big race.
10b	"Big Deal"	November 14, 1970
When Ratso and Batso dog-sit for Jughead, Hauntleroy interferes, resulting in Hot Dog growing to the size of a house.
11a	"Tragic Magic"	November 21, 1970
Sabrina and the Archies arrange a magic show to fund the school's athletic program.
11b	"Frankie"	November 21, 1970
Frankie is determined to lend a hand to his friends, but all of his attempts end in disaster, so Sabrina intervenes.
12a	"A Nose for News"	November 28, 1970
Reggie is selected to be editor of the school newspaper, but when he sees that Sabrina and her aunts are witches...
12b	"Beached"	November 28, 1970
The Goolies head to the beach on the same day that Archie and his friends decide to go for a swim, so Sabrina tries to keep her friends and her cousins apart.
13	"Ouch"	December 5, 1970
After Mummy turns off Aunt Hilda’s loud record, she puts a curse on him that makes music blare from his mouth.
14	"Smog"	December 12, 1970
While Sabrina is babysitting, Ratso and Batso cause smog to pour out of Horrible Hall, so the Archies arrive to investigate.
15	"Dirty Pool"	December 19, 1970
Sabrina and the Goolies take a stand when the Crosstown High Boys pollute the water supply with their car wash business.
16	"The Grayed Outdoors"	December 26, 1970
The Goolies and the Archies each go camping and discover that the Crosstown High Boys have been destroying the forest and erecting a race track.

== Home video ==
DVD cover

Genius Products released the complete series on DVD on April 29, 2008 in Region 1 as Sabrina the Teenage Witch: The Complete Animated Series.

Universal Pictures released a DVD titled Magical Antics, containing 10 episodes.

In 2017, Universal re-released the complete series DVD set.
