= The Archie Show =

American animated television series

- Also known as: The Archie Comedy Hour; Archie's Funhouse
- Genre: Animated sitcom; Musical
- Created by: John L. Goldwater (comic); Bob Montana (character designs)
- Based on: Archie Andrews by: John L. Goldwater, Bob Montana, Vic Bloom, & Archie Comics
- Written by: Bob Ogle; Chuck Menville; Len Janson; Jim Ryan; Bill Danch
- Directed by: Hal Sutherland
- Starring: Dal McKennon; Howard Morris; Jane Webb; John Erwin
- Composer: Ray Ellis
- Country of origin: United States
- Original language: English
- No. of episodes: 17

Production
- Producers: Norm Prescott; Lou Scheimer
- Running time: 22 minutes
- Production company: Filmation Associates

Original release
- Network: CBS
- Release: September 14, 1968 – January 4, 1969

Related
- The Archie Comedy Hour

The Archie Show (also known as The Archies) is an American musical animated sitcom television series produced by Filmation for CBS. Based on the Archie Comics, created by Bob Montana in 1941, The Archie Show aired Saturday mornings on CBS from September 1968 to 1969. The show featured the main characters in the Archie series, including Archie Andrews, Jughead Jones, Reggie Mantle, Betty Cooper and Veronica Lodge.

In 1969, the show was expanded to an hour and retitled The Archie Comedy Hour, which included a half-hour featuring Sabrina the Teenage Witch. In 1970, the show became Archie's Funhouse, and featured live-action segments. After three seasons, The Archie Show stopped airing on CBS in 1971.

Filmation continued to produce further Archie television series until 1978, including Archie's TV Funnies (1971–1973), The U.S. of Archie (1974–1976) and The New Archie and Sabrina Hour (1977–1978).

== Premise ==
A typical episode had featured two eight-minute stories, a "Dance of the Week" segment, a three-minute musical segment, and a Jughead joke segment. The show was targeted to both kids and young teenagers.

=== Characters ===
The main characters of the show are 17-year-old vocalist/rhythm guitarist Archie Andrews and his teen-age pals from Riverdale High School, including his best friend and food fiend drummer Jughead Jones; wise-cracking bassist Reggie Mantle; attractive, blonde, girl-next-door tomboy vocalist/lead guitarist/percussionist Betty Cooper; beautiful, spoiled-rich girl vocalist/keyboardist Veronica Lodge; and Jughead's English sheepdog Hot Dog. On the show, the friends appeared as a bubblegum pop band featuring Archie on lead guitar. Other characters in the show included Mr. Weatherbee, Miss Grundy, Dilton Doiley, Moose Mason, Pop Tate, Mr. Lodge, and Coach Kleats.

== Cast ==
- Dallas McKennon – Archie Andrews, Hot Dog, Mr. Weatherbee, Pop Tate, Mr. Lodge, Coach Kleats
  - Ron Dante – Archie Andrews (singing voice)
- Jane Webb – Betty Cooper, Veronica Lodge, Miss Grundy, Big Ethel
  - Toni Wine – Betty Cooper, Veronica Lodge (singing voice)
- John Erwin – Reggie Mantle
- Howard Morris – Moose Mason, Jughead Jones, Dilton Doiley
- Don Messick – Jughead Jones, Hot Dog ("Beauty Is Only Fur Deep")

== Episodes ==
No.	Title	Original release date
1	"The Added Distraction"	September 14, 1968
1	"The Disappearing Act"	September 14, 1968
Dance: The Bubblegum; Song: "Bang-Shang-A-Lang"; Jughead Short: Fetch
2	"A Hard Day's Knight"	September 21, 1968
2	"Beauty Is Only Fur Deep"	September 21, 1968
Dance: The Jughead; Song: "Boys and Girls"; Jughead Short: Shadow Boxing
3	"Anchors Away"	September 28, 1968
3	"Jughead's Double"	September 28, 1968
Dance: The Beanie; Song: "Truck Driver"; Jughead Short: Double Duty
4	"The Circus"	October 5, 1968
4	"The Prize Winner"	October 5, 1968
Dance: The Hamburger Hop; Song: "Catchin' Up On Fun"; Jughead Short: Painting
5	"Flying Saucers"	October 12, 1968
5	"Field Trip"	October 12, 1968
Dance: The Stick Shift; Song: "Ride, Ride, Ride"; Jughead Short: Homework
6	"The Marathon Runner"	October 19, 1968
6	"Way Out West"	October 19, 1968
Dance: The Veronica Walk; Song: "La-Dee-Doo-Down-Down"; Jughead Short: Pole Vaulting
7	"Hot Rod Drag"	October 26, 1968
7	"Snow Business"	October 26, 1968
Dance: The Betty; Song: "You Make Me Wanna Dance"; Jughead Short: Research
8	"Chimp Off the Old Block"	November 2, 1968
8	"Who's Afraid of Reggie Wolf"	November 2, 1968
Dance: The Banana Split; Song: "Time For Love"; Jughead Short: Skiing
9	"Kids Day"	November 9, 1968
9	"Jughead 'Sampson' Jones"	November 9, 1968
Dance: The Drag; Song: "Hide and Seek"; Jughead Short: lost (Note: According to the packaged booklet from the complete series set of The Archie Show, the original film negatives for the dance (the "Drag")/song ("Hide and Seek") segment on the "Kids' Day/Jughead 'Sampson' Jones" episode were lost, and they had to be sourced from a mediocre video transfer; not even the PAL video transfers were available (many of Entertainment Rights' Region 1 in-house Filmation releases are sourced from PAL-based video transfers, including this series). This may be due to Hallmark Entertainment purposely destroying the original film rolls, the original mag audio tracks, and other archival material related to the shows back in the '90s since Hallmark's short-sighted policy only allowed the company to distribute the in-house Filmation shows outside of the United States. The dance segment before the commercial break and the Jughead short during the episode were also not transferred for unknown reasons, leaving them lost for years.)
10	"Rocket Rock"	November 16, 1968
10	"Par One"	November 16, 1968
Dance: The Angel; Song: "You Little Angel, You"; Jughead Short: Retrieval
11	"Groovy Ghosts"	November 23, 1968
11	"PFC Hot Dog"	November 23, 1968
Dance: The Weatherbee; Song: "I'm in Love"; Jughead Short: Dancing
12	"Surf Bored"	November 30, 1968
12	"The Computer"	November 30, 1968
Dance: The Surfer; Song: "Love Light"; Jughead Short: Searching
13	"The Old Sea Dog"	December 7, 1968
13	"Jughead's Girl"	December 7, 1968
Dance: The Grundy; Song: "Rock and Roll Music"; Jughead Short: Late
14	"Dilton's Folly"	December 14, 1968
14	"Lodge Department Stores"	December 14, 1968
Dance: The Rocket Ship; Song: "Don't Touch My Guitar"; Jughead Short: Fishing
15	"Private Eye Jughead"	December 21, 1968
15	"Reggie's Cousin"	December 21, 1968
Dance: The Indian; Song: "Seventeen Ain't Young"; Jughead Short: Ice Cream
16	"Strike Three"	December 28, 1968
16	"Cat Next Door"	December 28, 1968
Dance: The Milkshake; Song: "Circle of Blue"; Jughead Short: Magic
17	"Jones Farm"	January 4, 1969
17	"Veronica's Veil"	January 4, 1969
Dance: The Touchdown; Song: "Kissin'"; Jughead Short: Housepaint

== Production ==
=== Development ===
In 1967, Irv Wilson, Filmation's agent at the time, approached John Goldwater about licensing his comics. Lou Schiemer, founder of Filmation, received a call from Wilson on having the rights to Archie Comics. He replied to his response, "What the hell is Archie? Is it something kids know?" Shortly, he flew out to meet John Goldwater and created a deal. The concept of the show was presented to CBS daytime programming executive, Fred Silverman, with several comic books. It was considered to be one of the cheapest and successful presentations Filmation has ever made. At the time, CBS immediately liked it due to an amount of cartoons, mostly Hanna-Barbera action cartoons, being protested by parent-run organizations, including Action for Children's Television (ACT), and it was bought. Filmation also immediately conceived an idea of making music an essential part of the show's concept.

In 1968, Norm Prescott called Don Kirshner to create music for The Archies. Kirshner happily accepted it, creating a music deal with the band.

Filmation took every aspect from the comics for the concept of the show. The main characters' tone was done for children to relate to the characters. Hot Dog was also immediately created for the show.

=== Voice cast ===
Most of the voice cast involved have worked on Filmation shows. The main voice cast included Dallas McKennon, John Erwin, Jane Webb, and Howard Morris. Don Messick was also part of the show, temporarily replacing Howard Morris for the episode "Beauty Is Only Fur Deep".

Filmation tried to find the voice cast for the 1940s radio show Archie Andrews, but was unsuccessful. Bob Hastings was asked to reprise his role as Archie Andrews, but refused as he was angry about not being paid for doing additional voices in The Adventures of Superboy. However, Jane Webb previously voiced Veronica Lodge in the radio show as of 1951. According to Lou Schiemer, it was thought to be John Erwin's first Filmation work he ever voiced.

=== Writing ===
The team of writers consisted of Bob Ogle, Chuck Menville, Len Janson, Jim Ryan, Bill Danch, and others. None of the writers involved were writers of the Archie Comics. The writing involved the concepts of dancing, singing, dating, high school, and youth problems for its appeal to young teenagers.

=== Music ===
The franchise's most notable effort was the music element in the form of the animated band The Archies. The Archie Show was designed to emulate the live-action series The Monkees by including rock music into each episode. All of the music included in the show were not specific to the plot of the stories.

For the process of the songs, Filmation's staff told Kirshner what they wanted to work, what the attitude should be, and what they were writing on the stories. Kirshner would work on the dance of the weeks and songs, and deliver them as a whole to the studio. Norm Prescott handled all of the music with Kirshner.

With vocals provided by Ron Dante and Toni Wine, the fictional group released a series of real-life albums and singles. Their most successful song is "Sugar, Sugar", which stood at the top of the pop charts for four weeks in 1969. "Sugar, Sugar" became the No. 1 song of 1969 on the Billboard charts, and as of 1969, it reportedly sold six million copies worldwide.

== Release ==
=== Original broadcast ===
The Archie Show debuted its first episode on September 14, 1968, on CBS at the 10 a.m. (EST) timeslot, competing with reruns of The Flintstones and Spider-Man. It was lead-in to another new Saturday-morning cartoon that was also Filmation's, The Batman/Superman Hour. The show was a commercial success; it regularly had a 47 Nielsen rating in the 2-11 age group. It was the most successful Saturday-morning cartoon at the time.

=== Syndication ===
Most of the episodes from all of the series produced by Filmation were syndicated in 1976 as The Archies (excluding material produced for The New Archie and Sabrina Hour, which did not debut until a year later). The music segments from The Archie Comedy Hour were missing in this syndication package, for unknown reasons.

The New Archie and Sabrina Hour was later rebroadcast in syndication, and on The Family Channel in a half-hour format as The Archie and Sabrina Surprise Package; this is the version offered by Universal Television, the current rightsholder for most Filmation programs, including the Archies franchise; a previous rightsholder, Entertainment Rights, was acquired by Classic Media in 2009, followed by DreamWorks Animation's purchase of Classic Media in 2012. Currently, Universal Pictures owns the rights to most Filmation programs, including the Archies franchise, since its purchase in 2016.

From 2010 until 2015, the show aired on Retro Television Network.

== Critical reception ==
Hal Erickson, author of Television Cartoon Shows, An Illustrated Encyclopedia described The Archie Show as "not what one could call inspired." Erickson criticized the humor that was described as "executed in a fragmented fashion" and "made doubly obvious by the overuse of a canned laugh track."

== Legacy ==
The Archie Show utilized a laugh track, the first such example of the colloquially-titled Saturday-morning cartoons. Owing to the success of The Archie Show, most animated series would begin using laugh tracks until the early 1980s. Previous animated series that used laugh tracks, such as The Flintstones and The Jetsons, were broadcast during prime time with the target audience being adults.

== Home media ==
Various VHS, Betamax, and laserdisc releases distributed by companies such as New Age Video, Inc. and Embassy Home Entertainment were released in several countries throughout the late '70s and '80s. Four volumes of The Archie Show were released in the early and mid '80s by Thorn EMI Video (later Thorn/EMI HBO Video in the release of its fourth volume) as part of its "Children's Maintee" line of animated shows. Each volume consists three full episodes with some of the other segments intact. All transfers were from unrestored 16mm masters.

Single-disc DVD compilations featuring four episodes each were released in 2004. Video transfers were NTSC-based with restored quality. There were four volumes in all.

- Archie & Friends featuring The Archie Show includes three episodes of The Archie Show (#9, #3 and #5 as per Genius Entertainment's Complete Series DVD set; #9 has the song and dance segments substituted from #16). Also included is one episode of U.S. Of Archie ("The Star Spangled Banner") and a segment from The Archie Comedy Hour (from show #1, "Coke Machine," as per the Genius Entertainment Archie's Funhouse: The Complete Series DVD set).
- Archie & Friends featuring Sabrina the Teenage Witch includes three Sabrina half-hours ("Pet Shop"/"Funny Bunny," "Blue Whale"/"Football Game," and "Frankie"/"Beached"), one episode of U.S. Of Archie ("The Day Of The Ladies"), and a segment from The Archie Comedy Hour ("Shadow Boxing" from show #1 as per Genius Entertainment's Archie's Funhouse: The Complete Series DVD set).
- Archie & Friends featuring Archie's TV Funnies includes three episodes of Archie's TV Funnies ("Riverdale Grand Prix Auto Race," "The Riverdale Air Circus," and "The Ghost Of Swedlow Swamp"), one episode of U.S. Of Archie ("The Wright Brothers"), and a segment from The Archie Comedy Hour ("Jughead Pulls Fire Hose" from show #3 as per Genius Entertainment's Archie's Funhouse: The Complete Series DVD set).
- Archie & Friends featuring Archie's Classic Cartoons includes one episode each of The Archie Show ("Rocket Rock"/"Par One"), The Archie And Sabrina Surprise Package ("Tops In Cops"), Archie's TV Funnies ("Flying Saucer"), U.S. Of Archie ("The Roughrider"), and a segment from The Archie Comedy Hour ("Telephone" from show #6 as per Genius Entertainment's Archie's Funhouse: The Complete Series DVD set).

On July 31, 2007, Genius Products released The Archie Show on DVD in Region 1 for the first time. The DVD-set included a packaged booklet and a special comic strip related to the Archies.

On March 4, 2008, Genius Products, LLC released Archie's Funhouse on DVD in Region 1 for the first time.

Genius Entertainment released the Sabrina The Teenage Witch segments from that season on DVD as part of their own set on April 29, 2008.

DVD name	Ep #	Release date
The Archie Show: The Complete Series	17	July 31, 2007
Archie's Funhouse: The Complete Series	16	March 4, 2008
Sabrina the Teenage Witch: The Complete Animated Series	31	April 29, 2008

== Other related media ==
The show was broadcast in different formats and under different titles. Some material are believed to be completely lost or destroyed after Hallmark Entertainment bought Filmation's library in 1995.

- The Archie Show (1968–69)
- Archie and his New Pals (TV special; 1969): Big Moose and Reggie compete against each other for Class President; Sabrina is introduced as a new Riverdale High student.
- The Archie Comedy Hour (1969–70): all-new material, now in an hour-long format, contained two Sabrina segments, one at the beginning of the show and one at the end, with a new "The Funhouse" joke segment in the middle that was loosely based on Laugh-In, and also contained regular segments such as Sabrina's Magic Trick and Dilton Doily's Inventions. There was a "Side Show" segment of one-liner jokes, followed by an Archies music segment.
- Archie's Funhouse (1970–71): an expanded version of the previous series' "Funhouse" format, now featuring an audience of live action kids and the "Giant Jukebox"; a music-heavy incarnation of the series, originally padded to one hour with rebroadcasts of segments from The Archie Show.
- Archie's TV Funnies (1971–73): Archie and the gang run a TV station, presenting a selection of cartoons within the series featuring characters from classic newspaper comic strips.
- Everything's Archie (1973–74): rebroadcasts of previously released material.
- The U.S. of Archie (1974–76): Archie and the gang re-interpret various events from American history.
- The New Archie and Sabrina Hour (1977–78): new Archie and Sabrina episodes, plus rebroadcasts of earlier material. The series was then divided into two separate 30-minute shows: The Bang-Shang Lollapalooza Show (Archie) and Super Witch (Sabrina).

The New Archie and Sabrina Hour was subsequently divided into The Bang-Shang Lalapalooza Show and Super Witch during its original network run. While the earlier Archie programs were broadcast by CBS, the last series was on NBC.

Hero High (1981) was planned to be part of The Kid Super Power Hour with Shazam! featuring Archie and the gang as superheroes; however, this series was altered at the last minute because Filmation's rights to the "Archie" characters had expired during production and was not renewed.

=== Spin-offs ===
- Sabrina and the Groovie Goolies (1970): later rebroadcast as both Sabrina the Teenage Witch and Groovie Goolies.
- Sabrina the Teenage Witch (1970–1974): rebroadcasts of both The Archie Comedy Hours' Sabrina episodes and the previous series' Sabrina episodes, plus new episodes, in its own time slot.
- Groovie Goolies (1970): rebroadcast of the previous series' Goolies episodes in its own time slot.
- The Bang-Shang Lollapalooza Show (1977): originally part of the aforementioned The New Archie and Sabrina Hour.
- Super Witch (1977): also originally part of the aforementioned The New Archie and Sabrina Hour.
- The Groovie Goolies and Friends (1978): syndication package, also featuring episodes from other Filmation series.

The "individual" versions of Sabrina the Teenage Witch and Groovie Goolies are currently offered by Universal.
