= Jim Ryan (writer) =

American screenwriter (1936–2022)

- Born: James Francis Ryan; April 21, 1936; Chicago, Illinois, U.S.
- Died: August 31, 2022 (aged 86); Van Nuys, California, U.S.
- Occupation: Screenwriter
- Years active: 1966–1998

James Francis Ryan (April 21, 1936 – August 31, 2022) was an American screenwriter in the DePatie–Freleng Enterprises, also the Filmation studios and Hanna–Barbera.

== Career ==
Ryan began his career at DePatie-Freleng Enterprises, where he penned episodes of The Inspector and scripted the Pink Panther short Psychedelic Pink. At Filmation, he wrote for several cartoons alongside writing partner Bill Danch, including Mission: Magic! (starring Rick Springfield), Shazam!, one of Ryan's few forays into live action, and Fabulous Funnies. Ryan and Danch were head writers of The Secret Lives of Waldo Kitty.

His most notable contribution at the studio was Fat Albert and the Cosby Kids. Ryan wrote early episodes of the series as well as a Christmas special. While working on Fat Albert, Ryan's scripts were reviewed by a panel of teachers and psychologists to ensure there was educational content.

Ryan supervised stories for Hanna-Barbera's Casper and the Angels. While with the studio, he wrote the 1988 film Scooby-Doo! and the Reluctant Werewolf. Other productions Ryan wrote for include Pound Puppies and Tom & Jerry Kids.

In 1996, Ryan wrote an article for The Los Angeles Times, discussing his difficulty finding writing work at 60 years old and critiquing commercialism in animation. His last script was an episode of Hey Arnold!.

== Works ==
His works include:

- The Super 6: writer (1 episode)
- The Pink Panther Show: story
- Will the Real Jerry Lewis Please Sit Down: writer (1 episode)
- Sabrina and the Groovie Goolies: writer (16 episodes)
- Groovie Goolies: writer
- Archie's TV Funnies: writer
- Fat Albert and the Cosby Kids: writer (1 episode)
- My Favorite Martians: writer
- The U.S. of Archie: writer (16 episodes)
- The Secret Lives of Waldo Kitty: writer
- The New Adventures of Gilligan: writer (5 episodes)
- Shazam!: writer (4 episodes)
- Ark II: writer (1 episode)
- The New Adventures of Batman: writer (1 episode)
- The New Archie and Sabrina Hour: writer
- Galaxy Goof-Ups: story
- Buford and the Galloping Ghost: story
- Yogi's Space Race: story (13 episodes)
- The New Shmoo: story
- Trollkins: story
- The Kwicky Koala Show: writer
- Space Stars: story
- Shirt Tales: story (5 episodes)
- Pink Panther and Sons: story
- The New Scooby-Doo Mysteries: writer (2 episodes)
- Paw Paws: story/writer (9 episodes)
- Pound Puppies: writer (1 episode)
- Scooby-Doo Meets the Boo Brothers: writer
- Scooby-Doo! and the Reluctant Werewolf: writer
- A Pup Named Scooby-Doo: writer/teleplay (3 episodes)
- Droopy: Master Detective: writer (7 episodes)
- The Tom and Jerry Kids Show: writer (12 episodes)
- The Cartoon Cartoon Show: writer (1 episode)
- What a Cartoon!: writer (1 episode)
- Hey Arnold!: writer (segment "Hookey")
