= Veronica Lodge =

Archie Comics character

- Archie Comics character
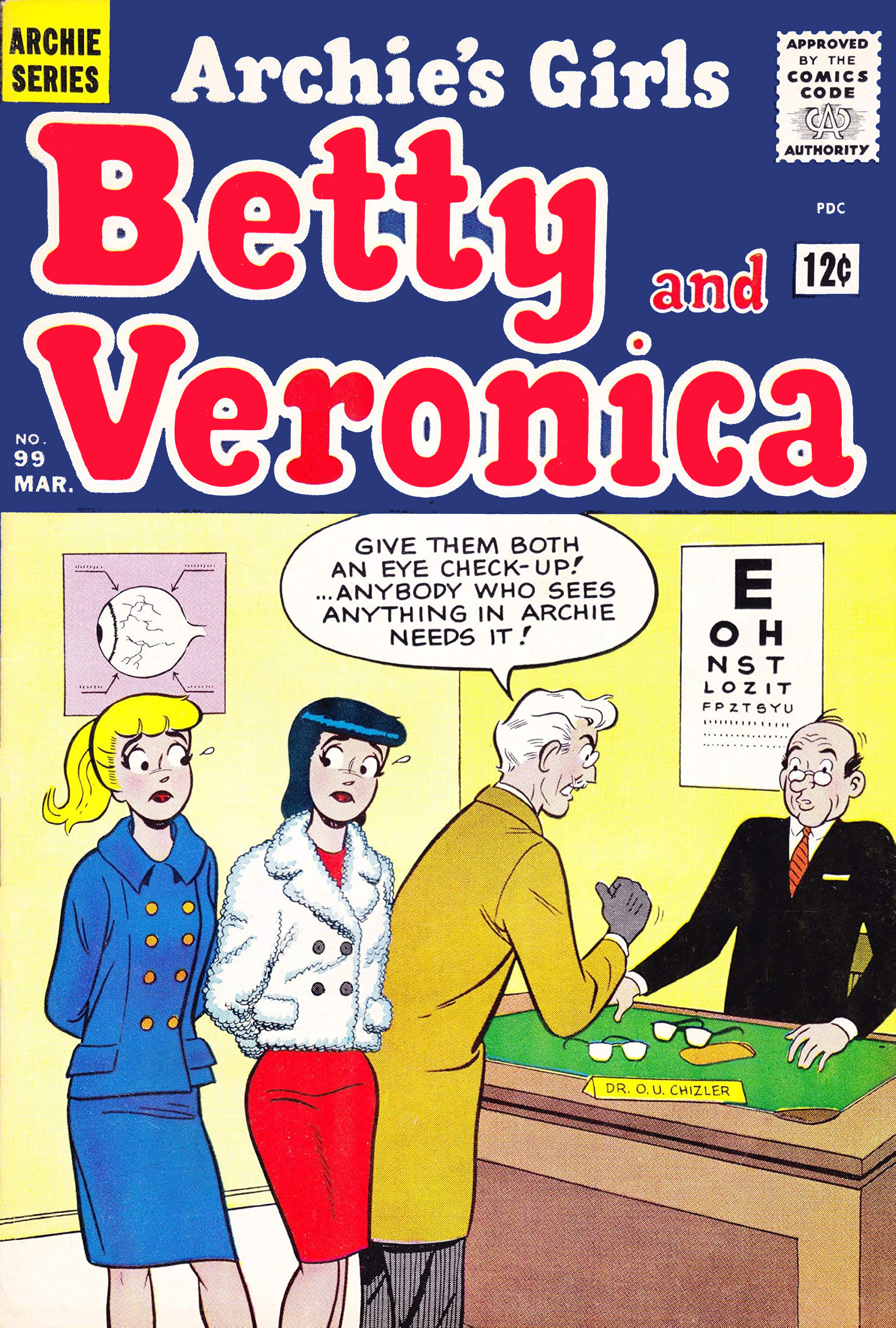
- Veronica Lodge (second from left) on the cover of Betty and Veronica #99 (March 1964)
- First appearance: Pep Comics #26 (April 1942)
- Created by: Bob Montana, John L. Goldwater
- Voiced by: Gloria Mann (1943–1953); Jane Webb (1951, 1968–1977); Alyson Court (1987); Camille Schmidt (1999–2002)
- Portrayed by: Karen Kopins (Archie: To Riverdale and Back Again); Camila Mendes (Riverdale); Suhana Khan (The Archies)
- School: Riverdale High School

In-universe information
- Family: Hiram Lodge (father); Hermione Lodge (mother); Hermosa Lodge (half-sister)
- Significant others: Archie Andrews (boyfriend, husband in Archie Marries Veronica); Reggie Mantle (boyfriend, husband in Archie Marries Betty, Riverdale); Chad Gekko (former husband in Riverdale); Jughead Jones (part of a quad in Riverdale); Betty Cooper (part of a quad in Riverdale)
- Relatives: Leroy (cousin); Marcy (cousin); Harper (cousin); Alice (cousin); Harper (cousin); Zoey (aunt)
- Home: Riverdale

Veronica Cecilia Lodge is one of the main characters in the Archie Comics franchise, and is the keyboardist and one of the three vocalists of rock band The Archies.

She is from New York but currently resides in the town of Riverdale, with her parents Hiram Lodge and Hermione Lodge. She is portrayed by Camila Mendes in Riverdale and Suhana Khan in The Archies.

== Fictional character biography ==
Veronica Lodge is the only child of Hiram Lodge, the richest man in Riverdale, and his wife Hermione Lodge. She is called both by her name "Veronica" and her nicknames "Ronnie" and "Ron". Bob Montana knew the real-life Lodge family, because he had once painted a mural for them. Montana combined that name with actress Veronica Lake to create the character of Veronica Lodge. Her character was added in Pep Comics 26, just four months after Archie Andrews, Betty Cooper, and Jughead Jones debuted in Pep and Jackpot Comics, and a month before Reggie Mantle debuted.

Veronica is a beautiful young woman with raven hair, favoring expensive, up-to-the-minute fashion. In some comics, Mr. Lodge claimed that he moved his family to Riverdale in order to avoid Veronica becoming spoiled, like many of the children he knew and grew up with. His plan did not succeed as well as he had hoped, as Veronica is often depicted on spending sprees, in which she maxes out her credit cards. In one story she buys out every shoe store in Riverdale to prevent any other girl from buying a pair of shoes that she herself wanted. At times, Veronica's vain and conceited attitude infuriates her father to the point that he has to somehow "teach her a lesson" and Veronica is forced to get a job of some kind or loses access to Archie.

In the earliest Archie Comics, there were a few different 'Veronica origin' stories. In her debut story, in Pep #26, April 1942, Veronica was referred to as a 'sub-debutante', daughter of 'Money Bags' Lodge of Beacon Hill, who had just come to live in Riverdale. In Pep #31, September 1942, Veronica was revealed to have lived in Boston before coming to Riverdale. Her father Burton K. Lodge was introduced as a 'big shot Boston politician'.

In Archie Comics #1 (Winter 1942), another version of Veronica's emigration to Riverdale is depicted. In this story, Veronica was referred to as 'the elusive sub-deb' and 'that girl from New York'. Archie had never met this 'society dame', but kept daydreaming about her, and wrote letters to her he never sent. Archie wrote to her asking her to a dance in Riverdale, and the letter got sent accidentally; he really wanted to ask Betty Cooper, and was only daydreaming. Even after he realized he had sent the letter, he did not think she would really come. Veronica accepted the invitation, thinking that a dance would be fun. At the time she apparently lived in New York with her mother, and she begged Mrs. Lodge to let her go to the Riverdale dance. Archie struggled trying to keep his dates with both girls, thus beginning their love triangle.

Veronica was ranked 87th in the Comics Buyer's Guide's "100 Sexiest Women in Comics" list created by Brent Frankenhoff.

== Lifestyle and relationships ==
Veronica enjoys a very posh lifestyle, as her family are among the richest people in the world. She nevertheless chooses to hang out with her less affluent friends, including the boy she is in love with, Archie Andrews, whom she nicknames "Archiekins." Her level of interest in him varies, however. Mr. Lodge often has nightmares that Veronica and Archie will marry. In 2009, Archie Comics published the Archie Marries Veronica to explore this possible future, marrying Veronica to Archie in one universe and to Reggie in another.

Veronica's best friend (and sometimes arch-rival) is Betty Cooper, and the two enjoy countless activities and interests. However, they are also at constant competition for Archie's affections. Veronica is often jealous of Betty, and will go to any length to steal anything that is important or a triumph for Betty, even if she (Veronica) did not want it in the first place. If Betty has a date with a new boy, Veronica will let her have Archie for a brief time, so that she can steal the date. If Betty is praised for some achievement, Veronica will do anything to ruin it for her. In one story, she gave Betty a candy bar containing nuts (to which Betty is allergic), so that Veronica could steal her modeling job. Veronica is often seen scheming to get Archie from Betty whenever she spots the two dating. Occasionally, she is victorious. But usually, Betty manages to successfully take revenge on her. Also, Archie occasionally has stood up to Veronica and stuck with Betty.

Her other friends include Ethel Muggs, Midge Klump and Nancy Woods, and they all enjoy having slumber parties and shopping at the mall together.

Periodically, she can be cocky and snobbish, constantly looking down on those less fortunate than herself, or sees herself as the rules of common society don't apply to her simply because she is wealthy, which causes her friends to be upset with her. During those times, she derisively refers to the public at large as "the common horde." At other times, when she can be snobbish, her father will punish her with having her credit cards confiscated.

Living in a house full of servants, Veronica often thinks that they are only there to serve her, and she doesn't see them as people. She will often yell at her maids to bring her something and "to be quick about it." At one point, her mother forced her to do all her own chores and fetch her own snacks, throughout the entire summer.

Even though they're great friends in the TV series, her relationship with Jughead Jones is less friendly in the comics. They constantly argue and are critical of each other's lifestyles. She cannot stand his laid-back attitude and witticisms, and he considers her an uncaring snob and enjoys arousing her temper. Jughead enjoys flouting her. However, Jughead and Veronica usually manage to stand being around each other for Archie's sake.

Veronica, being the only child of her wealthy parents, is outrageously spoiled and indulged by her family. Her father, Mr. Lodge, loves her dearly, and even though he frequently loses his temper with her snobbishness, frivolity, spendthrift nature, and choice of boyfriends, he can never refuse when Veronica asks him for something. Mr. Lodge does not consider most of the local boys worthy of his only daughter.

Veronica's cousin, Leroy, in Elementary School, has a mean-spirited, juvenile delinquent-like personality. When Leroy visits, he antagonizes Archie even more than Reggie does. Veronica has a young female cousin named Marcy, aged 14, who enjoys science fiction and other things that Veronica finds "geeky." So Veronica considers her annoying. Most of the time, however, Marcy is helpful to Veronica, who discovers that her cousin is not so geeky after all.

Veronica also has an older (teenage) cousin Alice, who lives on the "West Coast", who is so attractive that Veronica doesn't trust Alice to be alone with Archie.

== Interests and personality ==
Self-absorbed, insensitive, shallow, and easily succumbing to jealousy, the fashion-conscious Lodge stars the Archie spin-offs Betty and Veronica Magazine and Betty and Veronica Spectacular, as well as her own series, Veronica. Her foibles are commonly featured in stories. When upset, she has an extremely bad temper, which it is unwise to arouse. She is an impulsive shopper who cannot go long without buying clothes.

For example, she bought out every shoe store in Riverdale so she could have all the shoes which amounted to 200 pairs and so she could be totally exclusive and nobody else could have any shoes. This act of unbridled selfishness angers her father who grounds her indefinitely, orders her to return the shoes and cancels a party she wanted to throw, and she has a nightmare where she remade Riverdale in her own image, calling it Veronicaville. At first the idea of running the town her way, and basically being the queen was fun, but when Betty wore the same outfit she did, she naturally got upset and banished everyone out of town. When they leave for a new town to live in, and finally losing her father, when he leaves for greener pastures and she is left alone, she wakes up and finally wises up. She gives Betty the 200 pairs of shoes and throws the party she scheduled as a birthday party for her. (This was in a story called "The Me-ning of life".)

The cover of Veronica #167 featuring Veronica, Archie and The Veronicas

She is often addicted to gossip, which tends to aggravate Betty. Though commonly a cheerleader, her athletic abilities vary from superior to nonexistent, and she lacks domestic talents and many other skills that Betty has mastered. In fact, her cooking skills are so notoriously poor that the other characters literally fear for their lives when she tries to prepare a meal. Several stories portray Veronica as an expert at billiards, the reason being that her family owns a pool table, and she has been playing since she was a child.

At various times, she will take a common situation (for example being named the Most Popular Student in the Riverdale High School Yearbook) and make it into a situation aimed at increasing her already inflated ego.

Her best school subject is economics, and it is implied that she will eventually take over her father's business. She also has worked as a fashion model. By 1968, Betty and Veronica join Archie's band, The Archies. Betty plays the tambourine, Veronica plays the organ, and both sing accompaniment. In the 2000s, Veronica appeared a few times as Powerteen – a comic book character created by Chuck Clayton. She also enjoys traveling to exotic places, which was the basis for Veronica's Passport.

Besides being in The Archies, Veronica also appeared alongside indirect namesakes The Veronicas (Australian twins Lisa and Jess Origliasso) on the Veronica #167 cover and in the feature story, What's in a Name?, which includes the duo performing in Riverdale and explaining to Veronica how she was an influence on their name. (The issue had been enabled after Archie Comics and Warner Music Group had settled their legal battle over the duo's name by agreeing to a cross-promotion deal.)

== In other media ==
=== Radio ===
- In the 1940s and early 1950s, Veronica appeared in the radio show The Adventures of Archie Andrews on the Blue Network, Mutual, and NBC. She was voiced by Gloria Mann and Jane Webb.

=== Animation ===
- Veronica appeared in The Archie Show, a 1968 cartoon series produced by Filmation. She also appeared in the various spin-offs The Archie Comedy Hour, Archie's Funhouse, Archie's TV Funnies, The U.S. of Archie and The New Archie and Sabrina Hour produced in the same format. Jane Webb reprised her role as Veronica.
- Veronica appeared in The New Archies, a 1987 re-imagining of Archie and the gang. Veronica was portrayed as a pre-teen in junior high. She was voiced by Alyson Court.
- Veronica appeared in Archie's Weird Mysteries voiced by Camille Schmidt.

=== Live action ===
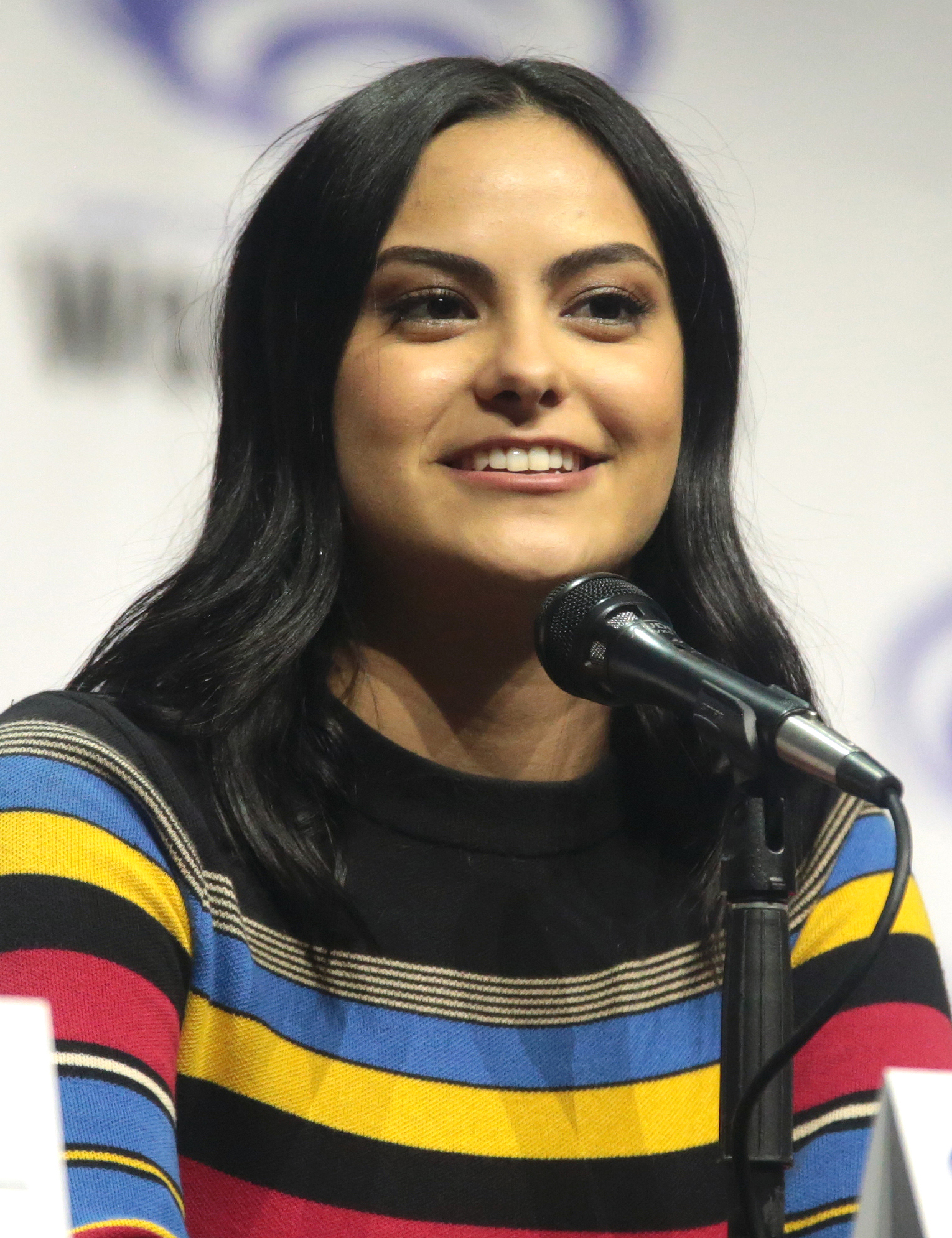
Camila Mendes plays Veronica on Riverdale.

- Veronica appears in the TV movie Archie: To Riverdale and Back Again, portrayed by Karen Kopins. Here, she has been divorced four times and lived in France since graduation, where she helps run the European branch of her father's business empire. Upon returning to Riverdale for her high school reunion, her old feelings for Archie start to resurface, as does her friendly rivalry with Betty. Throughout the film, she opposes her father's attempts to destroy Pop Tate's Chock'lit Shoppe.
- Veronica appears in Riverdale, a drama series for The CW with Camila Mendes portraying the character. The entire Lodge family in the series has been changed to be Latin American. In season four, to distance herself from her father's bad reputation, Veronica had her name legally changed to Veronica Luna, using her father's original last name which he had changed.
- Veronica Lodge and Betty Cooper as depicted in the comic series Chilling Adventures of Sabrina were the basis for the characters of the "Weird Sisters" Agatha, Dorcas and Prudence Night (respectively portrayed by Adeline Rudolph, Abigail Cowen, and Tati Gabrielle) in the Netflix web television series of the same name.
- Veronica made a film adaptation appearance in The Archies on Netflix, portrayed by Suhana Khan. The movie is an Anglo-Indian take on the comics and there Veronica is touted to be the daughter of the richest businessman in Riverdale.
