= Jane Webb =

American film, radio, voice actress (1925-2010)

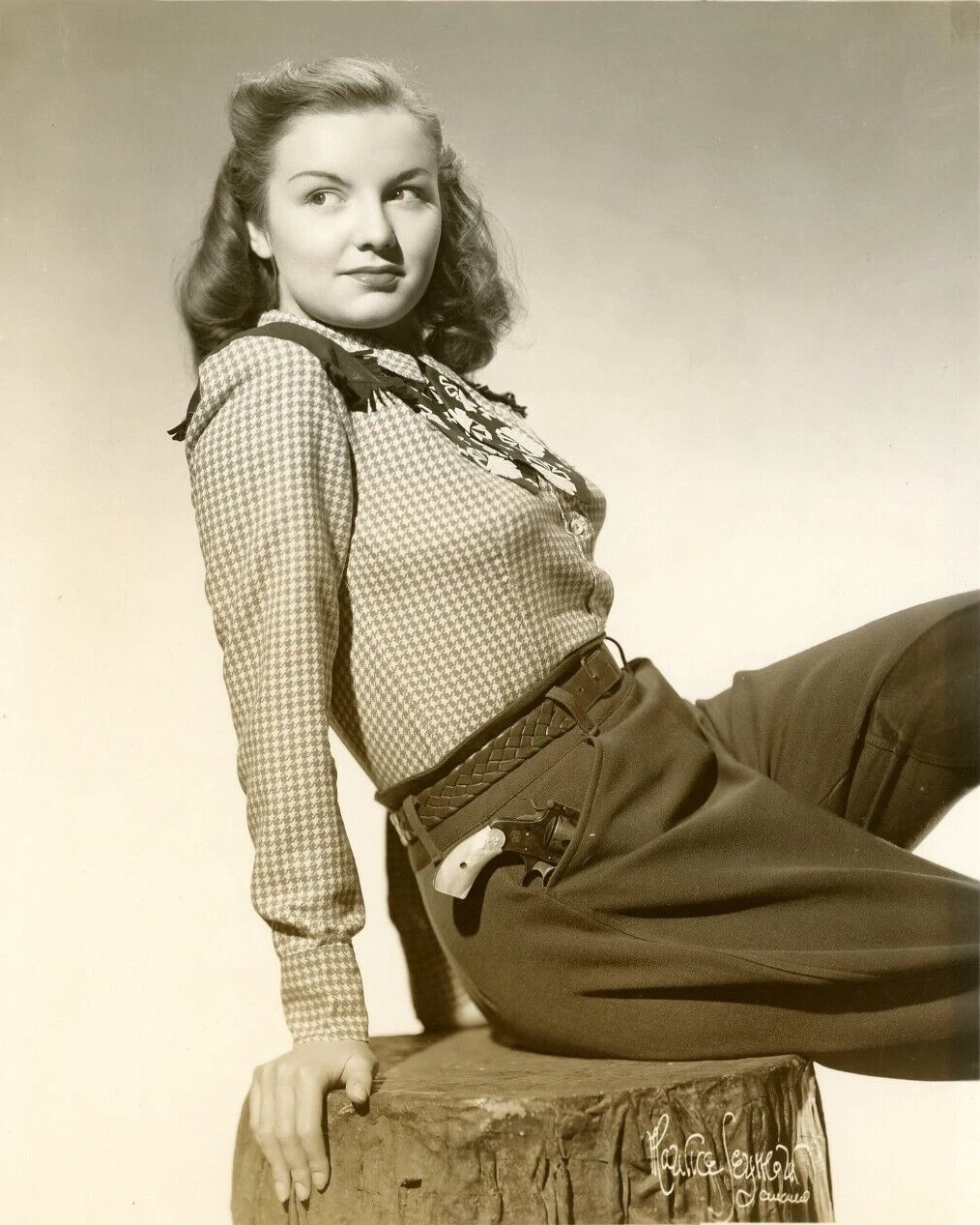
- Webb in The Baxters (1946)
- Born: Jane Karyl Webb; August 13, 1925
- Died: March 30, 2010 (aged 84); Green Valley, Arizona, U.S.
- Other names: Jane Webb Edwards; Joanne Louise
- Education: St. Mary's High School
- Occupations: Actress; entertainer
- Years active: 1933–1982
- Known for: The Batman/Superman Hour
- Spouse: Jack Edwards Jr. (m. 1948; died 2008)
- Children: 2

Jane Karyl Webb (August 13, 1925 – March 30, 2010) was an American film, radio, and voice actress, best known for her work on Filmation's cartoons.

== Early years ==
Webb's mother was Estelle Sigrid Webb, a Swedish immigrant who was an operatic soprano and performed at the Metropolitan Opera and Boston Opera House. She also opened a municipal opera in St. Louis. Her father James Howard Webb, known as Dr. Basil Webb, is a playwright who wrote and directed plays at the Hippodrome Theater in Chicago. Webb's brother John Webb performed theater in London and New York; her uncle Maurice Webb was University of London's president. She is a descendant of Walter Webb, who used to accompany George Washington on his surveying trips.

Raised in University City, Missouri, Webb studied at St. Mary's High School and Arcadia Convents at St. Louis. She spent three years working with repertoire companies in London, Manchester, Scotland, and Wales. Webb transferred from England to Chicago in 1936. As a high school student in Central YMCA High School, she was president of the student council and headed other student organizations. On June 10, 1942, Webb graduated with the highest honors. From early August 1942 through 1943, Webb took flying lessons. Webb attended Central Day College.

== Career ==
At the age of eight, she started her career as a professional entertainer when she was mistress of ceremonies, singing a Swedish song in a Chicago Century of Progress show. As a radio actress, Webb debuted in British radio shows made by British Broadcasting Company's television studios.

Throughout the 1930s and 1940s, Edwards acted on multiple radio series, including the Tom Mix Ralston Straight Shooters.

In March 1939, Paramount Pictures' talent agent Arthur Jacobson discovered Webb while searching for new actresses in Chicago. On April 19, 1939, Webb signed an acting contract with Paramount Pictures. Webb was supposedly going to be cast as the leading role in Dr. Cyclops as her acting debut, but was recast.

== Personal life ==
In her private life, Webb collected spools, rode miniature horses, kept canaries, read "everything", and made her own recipes. She had also written her own poetry, short stories, musical compositions, and a novel.

In 1947, Webb moved from Chicago to the neighborhood of Hollywood Hills in California, along with her family. In 1948, Webb married Jack Lawson Edwards, Jr, brother of actor and cartoon voiceover performer Sam Edwards, at her parents' home. The couple moved to New York City to continue their careers in television until they moved back to Hollywood Hills. In 1960, the couple moved to the neighborhood of Studio City.

The couple had two sons, Alan James Edwards (b. April 23, 1951), a U.S. Navy member, and Steven Monroe, a lead guitarist and vocalist.

== Death ==
On March 30, 2010, Webb died in Green Valley, Arizona.

== Filmography ==
Film
Year	Title	Role(s)
1939	Our Leading Citizen	Telephone operator (uncredited)
1939	$1,000 a Touchdown	Billie (uncredited)
1940	The Farmer's Daughter	Cashier (uncredited)
1972	Treasure Island	Mrs. Hawkins (voice)
1974	Oliver Twist	Nancy (speaking voice)

Radio
Year	Title	Role(s)
1936–1946	Tom Mix Ralston Straight Shooters	
1937–1945	Grand Hotel	
1939–1942	The Bartons	Midge
1940–1954	The Chicago Theater of the Air	Guest star
1941	Lone Journey	Jean
1942–1946	Bachelor's Children	Doris Keller (a.k.a. Dorothy Keeler)
1942–1951	Aunt Mary Show	Peggy Mead
1943–1947	The Baxters	Daughter
1943, 1951	Guiding Light	Peggy Ashley Regan
1943–1944	The Road to Life	Debutante, Janet Mercer
1944	That Brewster Boy	Minerva
1944	Sky High	Guest role
1945–1946	Island Venture	Medoza's daughter
1945–1948	Those Websters	Belinda Boyd
1948	The People Next Door	Charlotte
1949	Richard Diamond, Private Detective	One episode ("The John Blackwell Case")
1950	The Truitts	Gladys Truitt
1950	Errand of Mercy	Joan ("The Train Whistle")
1950–1951	Dr. Kildare	Mary Lamont
1950–1951	Crime Classics	Guest role
1950–1951	Heartbeat Theater	Guest role
1950–1951	Inheritance	Guest role
1950–1951	Yours Truly, Johnny Dollar	Guest role
1950–1951	Let George Do It	Guest role
1950–1951	Lux Radio Theatre	Guest role
1950–1951	Suspense	Guest role
1950–1951	The Chase	Guest role
1951	The Adventures of Archie Andrews	Veronica Lodge
1979	Suspense Story	Jessica Thomas

Television
Year	Title	Role(s)
1967	Journey to the Center of the Earth	Cindy Lindenbrook, Queen Mortia, Fossil
1968	The Batman/Superman Hour	Barbara Gordon/Batgirl, Catwoman, Charlotte Ruuse
1968	Fantastic Voyage	Dr. Erica Lane, Alvin Upwell, Lisette Clossard
1968	The Archie Show	Betty Cooper, Veronica Lodge, Miss Grundy, Big Ethel, additional voices
1968	Family Affair	Live-action role; television announcer ("A Matter of Choice")
1969	Archie and His New Pals	Preview special for The Archie Comedy Hour; Betty Cooper, Veronica Lodge, Miss Grundy, Sabrina Spellman
1969	The Archie Comedy Hour	Sabrina Spellman, Aunt Hilda, Aunt Zelda, Betty Cooper, Veronica Lodge, Miss Grundy, Big Ethel, Miss Della
1969	The Hardy Boys	Wanda Kay Breckenridge, Gertrude Hardy
1970	Will the Real Jerry Lewis Please Sit Down	Geraldine Lewis, Rhonda
1970	Archie's Funhouse	Betty Cooper, Veronica Lodge, Miss Grundy, Big Ethel
1970	Sabrina and the Groovie Goolies	Sabrina Spellman, Aunt Hilda, Aunt Zelda, Betty Cooper, Veronica Lodge, Miss Grundy, Big Ethel, Miss Della, additional voices
1970	Groovie Goolies	Bella La Ghostly, Sabrina Spellman, additional voices
1971	Archie's TV Funnies	Betty Cooper, Veronica Lodge, Miss Grundy, Big Ethel, Tess Trueheart, Moon Maid, Gravel Gertie, Mama, Emmy Lou, Taffy, Nancy Ritz, Fritzi Ritz, Cookie, Hazel Nutt, Broom-Hilda, Breathless Mahoney, additional voices
1971	Aesop's Fables	Female Tortoise, Bee, Female Swan, Mother Duck, Duckling, Female Hare #1, Female Hare #2
1972	The ABC Saturday Superstar Movie	Lassie and the Spirit of Thunder Mountain (Laura Turner); The Brady Kids on Mysterious Island (Babs); Daffy Duck and Porky Pig Meet the Groovie Goolies (Petunia Pig, Nurse; credited as "Joanne Louise")
1972	The Brady Kids	Babs, Diana Prince/Wonder Woman ("It's All Greek to Me"), additional voices
1973	Lassie's Rescue Rangers	Laura Turner, additional voices
1973	My Favorite Martians	Katy O'Hara, Jan, Coral, Lorelei Brown, Miss Casserole
1974	The U.S. of Archie	Betty Cooper, Veronica Lodge, Miss Grundy, additional voices
1974	The New Adventures of Gilligan	Ginger Grant, Mary Ann Summers (credited as both "Jane Webb" and "Jane Edwards")
1975	The Secret Lives of Waldo Kitty	Felicia, Pronto, Sparrow
1976–1979	Tarzan, Lord of the Jungle	Additional voices
1977	The New Archie and Sabrina Hour	Sabrina Spellman, Aunt Hilda, Aunt Zelda, Betty Cooper, Veronica Lodge, Miss Grundy, Big Ethel, Miss Della, additional voices
1980	General Hospital	Live-action role; announcer (one episode)

Shorts
Year	Title	Role(s)
1967	The Three Faces of Stanley	Unknown name (voice)
1969	How We Feel About Sound	Clancy's Mom (voice)
1971	Hopscotch	Unknown name (voice)
1977	He Really Lives	Unknown name (voice)

== Discography ==
- The Wizard of Oz (1968)
- The Dirty Old Man (1974) by Jim Backus (additional voices)
- Alice in Wonderland by Lewis Carroll (1982)
