= John Erwin =

American voice actor (1936–2024)

- Born: John Lee Erwin; December 5, 1936; Cambridge, Massachusetts, U.S.
- Died: c. December 20, 2024 (aged 88); Camarillo, California, U.S.
- Occupation: Voice actor
- Years active: 1959–2010

John Lee Erwin (December 5, 1936 – c. December 20, 2024) was an American voice actor best known for voicing He-Man in He-Man and the Masters of the Universe, Reggie Mantle in The Archie Show, and Morris the Cat.

== Career ==
Erwin was the voice of He-Man in the Filmation productions He-Man and the Masters of the Universe and She-Ra: Princess of Power that ran from 1983 to 1986. Due to the extreme cost-cutting by Filmation, the cast of voice actors was small, and with producer Lou Scheimer actually performing the bulk of the character voices. Erwin was also the voice of the henchman character Beast Man, and would on occasion perform the voices of other supporting characters such as Webstor and Ram Man.

Although generally recognized for his work on He-Man, Erwin has many years of voice acting to his credit (including the voice of Reggie Mantle in Filmation's Archie cartoons), and has provided voices for many productions ranging from television advertisements to live-action movies since the 1960s. He was the voice of Morris the Cat from 9Lives cat food in several television commercials.

From 1959 to 1965, he starred as Teddy in the television Western Rawhide.

In 1989, his voice was heard as a radio newscaster in Back to the Future Part II and as a football announcer in the 2000 Disney movie Remember the Titans.

He also did small spot roles in various Hanna-Barbera episodes for different shows (such as Hanna-Barbera's animated series The Thing) and others, going uncredited.

== Personal life and death ==
Erwin had moved away from California by 2010, although in 2019 Alan Oppenheimer stated he had recently visited Erwin in his retirement community in Thousand Oaks, California.

Erwin died at his home in Camarillo, California, on or around December 20, 2024, at the age of 88. His death was not announced publicly until January 31, 2025.

== Filmography ==
=== Film ===
Year	Title	Role	Notes
1960	13 Fighting Men	Cpl. McLean	
1981	Looker	Commercial Announcer	Voice role; Uncredited
1985	He-Man and She-Ra: The Secret of the Sword	He-Man / Prince Adam, Beast Man	Voice role
1985	Skeletor's Revenge	He-Man / Prince Adam, Beast Man	Voice role; direct to video
1988	Everybody's All-American	Redskins' Announcer	Voice role
1989	Back to the Future Part II	Radio Sportscaster	Voice role
1995	Babe	Additional voices	Voice role
2000	Remember the Titans	Football Announcer	Voice role

=== Television ===
Year	Title	Role	Notes
1959–1965	Rawhide	Teddy	22 episodes
1968–1970	The Archie Show	Reggie Mantle	Voice role; 30 episodes; including The Archie Comedy Hour and Archie's Funhouse
1969	Archie and His New Pals	Reggie Mantle	Voice role; Television movie
1969	Here's Lucy	Narrator	Uncredited; 2 episodes
1969–1972	Sabrina the Teenage Witch	Reggie Mantle, Ambrose Spellman, Humphrey, Hexter	Voice role; 47 episodes
1970	Groovie Goolies	Various voices	16 episodes
1971	Aesop's Fables	Donkey	Voice role; Television movie
1971	Archie's TV Funnies	Reggie Mantle	Voice role; 16 episodes
1973	The New Dick Van Dyke Show	Jeff Kingsley	Episode: "The Young Surgeons"
1974	The U.S. of Archie	Reggie Mantle	Voice role; 16 episodes
1977	The New Archie and Sabrina Hour	Reggie Mantle, Q, Slick	Voice role; 21 episodes
1977–1978	Archie's Bang-Shang Lalapalooza Show	Reggie Mantle	Voice role
1979	ABC Weekend Specials	Casey Balloo	Voice role; Episode "The Horse That Played Centerfield"
1979	Fred and Barney Meet the Thing	Ronald Radford III, Clumpley	Voice role; 13 episodes
1983–1985	He-Man and the Masters of the Universe	He-Man / Prince Adam, Beast Man, Ram-Man, Faker, Webstor, Whiplash, Strongarm, Icer, Granamyr, Count Marzo, Evilseed, Plundor, Kothos, Additional voices	Voice role; 130 episodes
1985	He-Man and She-Ra: A Christmas Special	He-Man / Prince Adam, Webstor	Voice role; Television movie
1985–1987	She-Ra: Princess of Power	He-Man / Prince Adam, Beast Man, Granamyr, Webstor, Various	Voice role; 93 episodes
1991	Spacecats	Various	Voice role; 13 episodes
1999	Malcolm & Eddie	Announcer	Episode: "The Wrongest Yard"
2005	Family Guy	He-Man	Episode: "Brian the Bachelor"; final role

== Awards and nominations ==
Year	Award	Category	Nominated work	Result	Ref.
2024	CinEuphoria Awards	Merit - Honorary Award	He-Man and the Masters of the Universe	Won	
2024	CinEuphoria Awards	Merit - Honorary Award	She-Ra: Princess of Power	Won	
