= Chuck Clayton =

- Archie Comics character
- First appearance: Life with Archie #110 (June 1971)
- Voiced by: Dal McKennon
- Portrayed by: Jordan Calloway
- Hometown: Riverdale
- School: Riverdale High School

In-universe information
- Full name: Charles Clayton
- Significant other: Nancy Woods
- Relatives: Coach Clayton (father); Alice Clayton (mother); Monica (cousin); Greg Clayton (grandfather)

Charles "Chuck" Clayton is a teenage fictional character published by Archie Comics. Chuck lives in the fictional town of Riverdale, and is the friend of Archie Andrews, Betty Cooper, Jughead Jones, and other students at Riverdale High School. Chuck first appeared in Life With Archie #110 in 1971.

Chuck was created as a means of adding diversity to the cast of Archie characters, although Valerie (of Josie and the Pussycats) predates him by several years. Jordan Calloway portrayed the character on Riverdale.

== History ==
Chuck is African American and the son of Floyd Clayton, who works at Riverdale High School as the school's coach, and Alice Clayton, a housewife. In earlier stories, including his recurring appearances in Archie at Riverdale High, Chuck was usually shown as one of Riverdale High's top athletes. Chuck was also depicted as a close friend of Archie, often spending time together or engaging in various adventures.

By the early 1990s, Chuck's interest in cartooning was added to round out his character, and also serves to promote the comics he appears in. In modern stories, Chuck is depicted primarily as a cartoonist, whose greatest ambition is to someday become a professional comic book and comic strip illustrator. Despite the long hours he spends practicing his craft, he attempts to be a well-rounded individual by engaging in other pursuits; such as participating in sports, studying his bloodlines, and spending time with his girlfriend, Nancy Woods.

While Chuck is a minor character in most stories, one story showed him as a major character where he competed against Veronica on a game show which was a clear takeoff of Win, Lose or Draw. Chuck recruits two men who own the local comic book store to be on his team, while Veronica has two professional artists on hers. Veronica loses when her drawings are not deduced while Chuck's are deciphered. (It is then revealed that Veronica unknowingly hired abstract artists). Chuck spends his winnings at the store owned by his two teammates; buying as many comic books in order to further research professional illustrators.

== Relationships ==
Chuck's steady girlfriend is Nancy Woods, one of the series' few steady couples. While Nancy shares some of Chuck's interests in art, she often berates him for sometimes focusing more on his art than their relationship.

== In other media ==
=== Animation ===
- Chuck appeared in 1974's animated Archie series The U.S. of Archie and 1977's The New Archie and Sabrina Hour, voiced by Dal McKennon.
- Chuck also was shown in an Archie parody in an episode of Robot Chicken, where he was derisively called a "token" African-American character.
- Chuck is a minor character in Archie's Weird Mysteries; he is often seen alongside Nancy Woods, although their exact relationship is unclear. Both of them only spoke in the episode, "Driven to Distraction", before being relegated to silent cameos throughout the rest of the series.

=== Live action ===
- Chuck appears in the TV series Riverdale and is portrayed by Jordan Calloway. He takes on a more antagonistic role as a womanizer rather than the considerate and sweet-natured personality of his previous portrayals. Late in the second season, he expressed a desire to reform and demonstrated his artistic side by joining the school play, where his professional, hard-working, and above all, respectful demeanor gained the forgiveness of the other students, and brought him closer to his traditional portrayal. Like his counterpart in the comics, Chuck's ambition is to become an artist and illustrate children's books.
