= Island Venture (radio program) =

American old-time radio adventure drama

- Country of origin: United States
- Language: English
- Home station: WBBM
- Syndicates: CBS
- Starring: Gil Perry
- Original release: November 8, 1945 – June 20, 1946
- Sponsored by: Wrigley gum

Island Venture is an American old-time radio adventure drama. It was broadcast on CBS from November 8, 1945, until June 20, 1946

The program originated at WBBM in Chicago, Illinois, replacing The First Line (1942-1945), which focused on the work of the U.S. Navy during World War II.

Island Venture dramatized the adventures of ex-Navy pilot Gil Perry as he operated the Inter-Island Air Service, based on Ilopan island in the Central Pacific. Episodes also featured Trigger Brett, Berry's partner; Chula, a big shot; Mendoza, who owned a cargo line, and Mendoza's daughter. In February 1946, the character of Nancy Goodwin was added as both the operator of a competing air service and as a romantic interest for Perry.

The cast featured Jerry Walter as Perry, Hugh Rowlands as Brett, Clare Boreum as Mendoza, Willard Waterman as Chula, and Jane Webb as Mendoza's daughter. Others often heard were Norman Gottschalk, Jonathan Hole, and Ken Nordine.

Island Venture was sponsored by Wrigley gum.
