= Betty Cooper =

Archie Comics character

- Archie Comics character
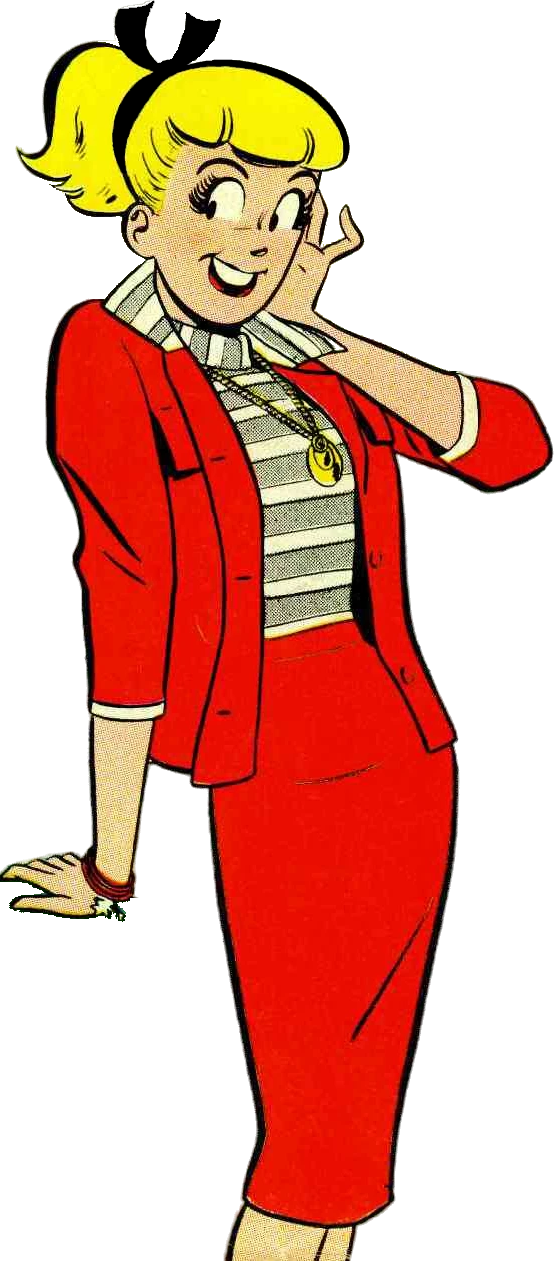
- Betty drawn by Harry Lucey, from the cover of Archie #115 (Dec. 1960)
- First appearance: Pep Comics #22 (Dec. 1941)
- Created by: Bob Montana; John L. Goldwater
- Voiced by: Rosemary Rice (1943–1953); Doris Grundler (1945); Jane Webb (1968–1977); Toni Wine (The Archie Show; singing); Lisa Coristine (1987); America Young (1999–2002)
- Portrayed by: Lili Reinhart; Eden Summer Gilmore & Hannah Bos and Michele Scarabelli (Riverdale; young & older); Lauren Holly (Archie: To Riverdale and Back Again); Khushi Kapoor (The Archies)
- Hometown: Riverdale
- School: Riverdale High School

In-universe information
- Full name: Elizabeth Cooper
- Nickname: Betty
- Family: Polly Cooper (sister); Charles Smith (half-brother; Riverdale); Hal Cooper (father); Alice Cooper (mother)
- Significant others: Archie Andrews (boyfriend, husband in Archie Marries Betty, fiancée in Riverdale); Jughead Jones (with Archie Andrews and Veronica Lodge, in a "quad", Riverdale)
- Relatives: Juniper & Dagwood (Niece and Nephew via Polly; Riverdale)

Elizabeth "Betty" Cooper is one of the main characters appearing in American comic books published by Archie Comics. She is the lead guitarist, percussionist and one of the three singers of The Archies. The character was created by Bob Montana and John L. Goldwater, and first appeared in Pep Comics #22 (cover-dated Dec. 1941), on the first page of the first Archie story, serving as a love interest to Archie Andrews.

Betty is in love with Archie, which drives her attempts to win his affections by whatever means possible, and her rivalry with her best friend, the vocalist and keyboardist Veronica Lodge, have been among the longest-running themes in the comics. She is portrayed by Lili Reinhart in Riverdale and Khushi Kapoor in The Archies.

== Publication history ==
Betty and Me
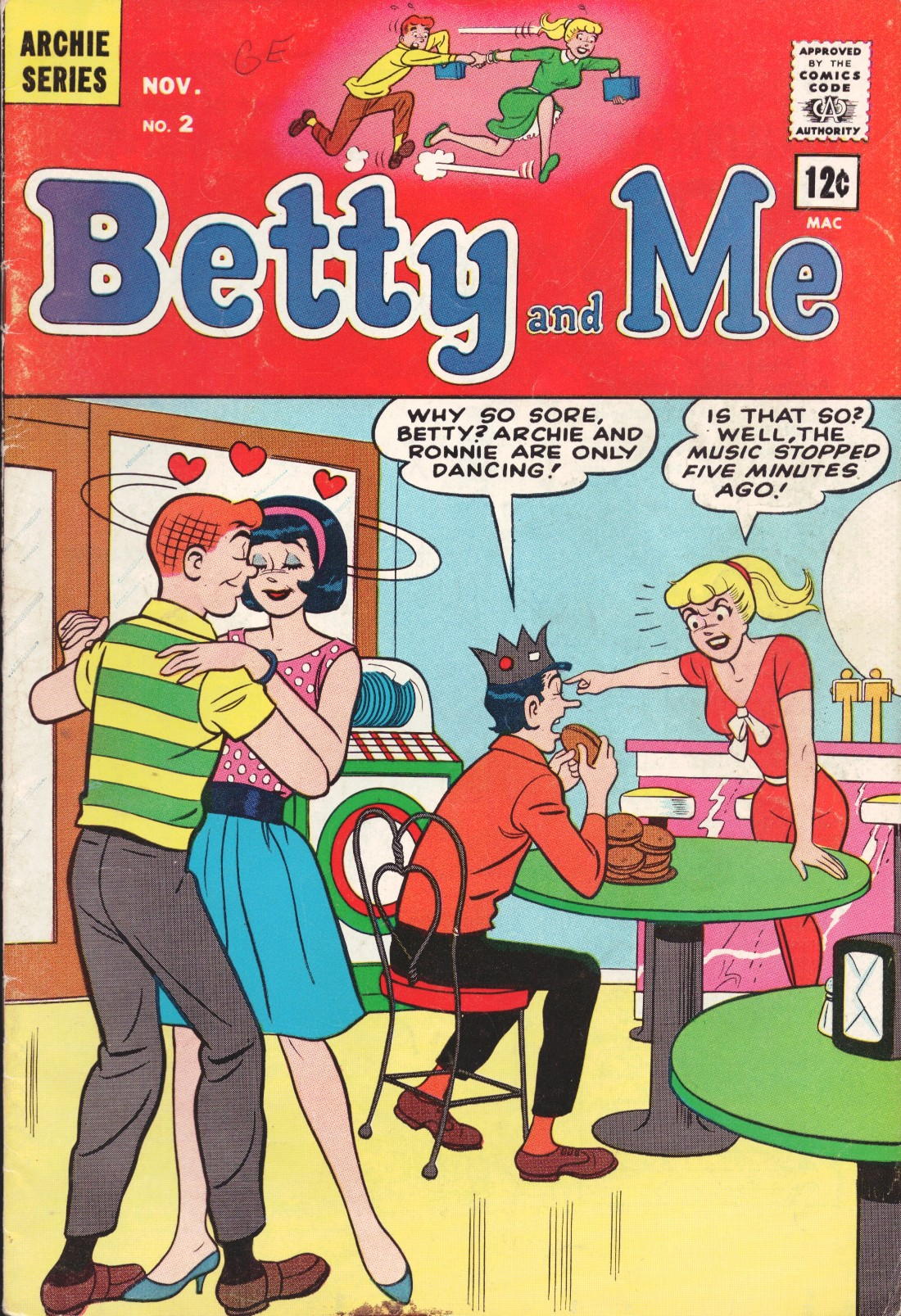
- Cover of Betty and Me #2 (November 1965)

Publication information
- Publisher: Archie Comics
- Schedule: Varied between bimonthly and monthly
- Format: Ongoing series
- Genre: Romantic comedy
- Publication date: Aug. 1965 – Aug. 1992
- No. of issues: 200
- Main character: Betty Cooper

Betty

Publication information
- Publisher: Archie Comics
- Schedule: Varied between bimonthly and monthly
- Format: Ongoing series
- Genre: Romantic comedy
- Publication date: Sept. 1992 – Jan. 2012
- No. of issues: 195
- Main character: Betty Cooper

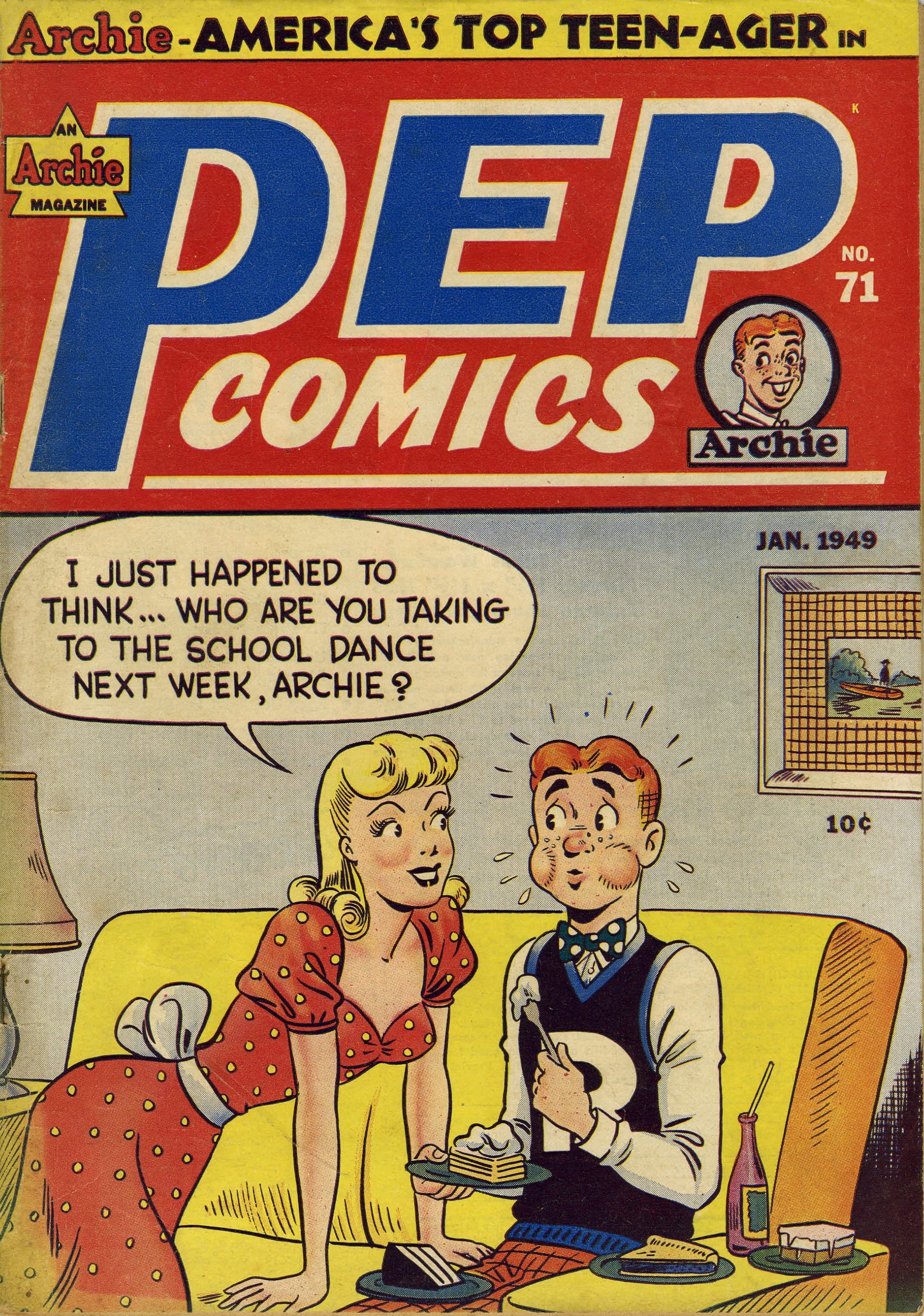
Betty and Archie on the cover of Pep Comics #71 (January 1949)

Betty was named for, and originally based on, Betty Tokar Jankovich, a Czech immigrant who briefly dated Archie co-creator Bob Montana in 1939 when she was 18. Created to serve as a love interest for Archie Andrews, she is portrayed as a smart, talented, sweet, tomboyish yet beautiful girl with blonde hair and blue eyes.

In addition to appearing in many Archie stories, Betty was the star of two long-running comic book titles published by Archie Comics during the period 1965–2012: Betty and Me (later styled as Betty & Me), which published 200 issues from Aug. 1965 to Aug. 1992; and Betty, which published 195 issues from Sept. 1992 to Jan. 2012. She also was featured in Betty's Diary, which published 40 issues from Apr. 1986–Apr. 1990.

Currently, Betty is the co-star of Betty and Veronica Digest Magazine, now known as B&V Friends Double Digest, which was launched in Nov. 1980 and has published more than 250 issues; and Betty and Veronica Double Digest, which has published 250+ issues since June 1987.

She was the co-star of Betty and Veronica, which ran for 347 issues (and eight annuals) from March 1950–April 1987. A new Betty and Veronica series published 278 issues from June 1987–late 2015. The limited series Betty and Veronica, taking place in their rebooted New Riverdale universe, was published in 2017. Betty and Veronica also co-starred in:

- Betty and Veronica Spectacular (90 issues, Oct. 1992–July 2009)
- Betty and Veronica Summer Fun (six annual issues, 1994–1999)

== Fictional character biography ==
Betty Cooper is the third and youngest child and second daughter of Hal Cooper and Alice Cooper. Her older brother Chic Cooper and older sister Polly Cooper have moved out of Riverdale, their hometown. Chic moved to New York City and Polly to San Francisco, but both occasionally appear in flashbacks to Betty's childhood, and both occasionally visit their family.

The quintessential girl next door, Betty's middle class upbringing is a world apart from the flashy lifestyle of her wealthy friend, Veronica Lodge. This difference is evident in multiple occasions, such as when she and Veronica are competing for Archie Andrews' heart, and yet they remain best friends (Veronica once told Archie that she and Betty are only rivals in "unimportant matters", like boys).

In the late 1960s, the two girls joined Archie's band, a garage band appropriately named The Archies. Both sang, and Betty played a tambourine, while Veronica played an organ. Some stories indicate that Betty is the better vocalist. Additionally, there is little consistency in the instruments she is able to play. Betty has played the recorder, tambourine, maracas, guitar, banjo, keyboard, saxophone, cello, and the bongos.

== Interests and personality ==
Betty is considered to be friends with everybody, and a loving daughter and sister. She helps the homeless, reads to senior citizens, and rescues wounded animals and birds.

Betty's hobbies include playing sports (particularly baseball), cooking (the gang thinks her cooking is excellent), and looking after animals (she owns a cat, Caramel). She is also concerned with the environment and other social issues and encourages the rest of the gang to clean up after themselves. She loves children and sometimes babysits Jellybean with Jughead as well as other children in Riverdale. Occasionally, families hire Betty to keep their elderly members company. Betty is a skilled mechanic who frequently helps Archie with his broken down car Betsy. Betty is also good at skiing and car-racing. She is often said to be the best pitcher in the girls' baseball team. Betty is a scuba diver, wearing a red shorty wetsuit, breathing with an air tank she carries on her back and a regulator in her mouth, wears red fins on her feet and a mask on her face, but she prefers to swim underwater.

Betty has an above-average intelligence and is one of the smartest students at Riverdale High School, along with Dilton Doiley. In one story she won an award and was sent to compete in New York and has won numerous academic awards. At one point, she gained ESP when an encyclopedia accidentally fell on her head. This ability took away all hope for the future; Archie asked Veronica for a date, but Betty knew that Archie would dump Veronica for her. Betty lost her ESP power when a ball that Reggie kicked accidentally hit her; in her gratefulness, she gave him a thankful kiss.

Betty's many talents and accomplishments often make her friend Veronica jealous, who then tries to sabotage Betty to steal her glory and make her look bad.

During a stay at the Lodge mansion, while the family are in Europe, Betty is waited on hand and foot by the servants and, true to her personality, she quickly begins to feel guilty about being waited on. Wanting to do something very special for them in appreciation for the tough jobs that they do (and for what also seems to be a thankless job in serving someone like Veronica, who tends to be harsh and rude towards those who serve her), she throws them a pool party which surprises Mr. and Mrs. Lodge and Veronica. In return, Smithers, the butler, and the rest of the staff, who are amazed by what Betty did for them (since they never seem to get any appreciation from Veronica), offer to help Betty with the next party she throws, for free. Mr. Lodge would then scold Veronica about her harsh treatment towards them, much to her embarrassment.

On the TV show Riverdale, Betty participates in many extracurricular activities at Riverdale High School, including cheerleader with the other members of The River Vixens, writing for The Blue and Gold with Jughead Jones and discovering the true identities and intentions/actions of many people in Riverdale, including Clifford Blossom (Cheryl Blossom's father), Penelope Blossom (Cheryl Blossom's mother), Hal Cooper, and Robert Phillips (a.k.a. The Sugarman).

== Relationships ==
Betty's best friend is Veronica. Although the two are often involved in disputes over Archie or something else that evokes jealousy, they have remained friends. The two have commented that Jughead and Archie's friendship could not compare to theirs. In many stories, Betty and Veronica team up or help each other despite Veronica's jealousy and bitterness towards her. Betty's other female friends include Ethel Muggs, Midge Klump, and Nancy Woods, all of whom share common interests and group activities such as shopping and cheer-leading.

Frequently, Betty has been shown to flirt with and date bassist Reggie Mantle early on in the titles' runs and occasionally still, more often than not as a casual date. Once Betty said that sometimes the way Archie and Reggie fight over her, it sounds like she has the plague. In the Life with Archie magazines that depict a future timeline in which Archie marries Veronica, Betty and Reggie are portrayed as a loving couple. It has been hinted they may be planning to get married.

Betty's relationship with Jughead Jones has mostly been that of close confidant and close friend, as they normally discuss their issues more candidly with each other than anyone else; Jughead will provide commentary on her feelings for Archie, and Betty will attempt to "better" Jughead, by getting rid of his slothful attitude and laziness. Once when she had a sprained ankle, Veronica told both Archie and Jughead to visit her. The four of them were having dinner together when people from the school mistook Jughead as Betty's boyfriend because he was carrying chocolates to her house. Jughead appears to care more about Betty than other girls and there have been hints of a potential romantic relationship between them. He once accidentally asked her out to a school dance. When he was telling Archie what to do, Betty walked up behind him and thought he was asking her even though he was just demonstrating how to ask Betty to the dance. In one story, Jughead even says that if the time ever comes that he would willingly kiss a girl, it would be Betty. A happy tear is seen sliding down Betty's face at this comment.

She had a friendship with an elderly woman named Lydia Wyndham, whom she found when doing research about World War I. With this acquaintance, Betty got to know an accomplished writer and poet with a sharp mind (and a sad past—Betty's research had turned up a beau of Ms. Wyndham's who was killed in combat), but after a while, Ms. Wyndham herself died.

At times, Betty is seen to have a close friendship with Cheryl Blossom, especially in Cheryl's own title. However, at other times, Betty and Veronica regard the seductive Cheryl as a threat because she tries to lure Archie away from them, and the two best friends unite against Cheryl to protect their interests. Jason Blossom, Cheryl's twin brother, is sometimes seen to have a genuine interest in Betty, which makes Archie jealous.

In the late '90s, Betty started dating Adam Chisholm. It was thought by some people that Betty had chosen Adam over Archie. This event made Archie jealous and he concentrated his attention on Betty, ignoring Veronica, as he always does when he thinks someone else may take Betty away from him. Though in actuality, Adam has rarely been seen in the stories after that story arc, and Betty has continued to prefer Archie.

== Career ==
Betty enjoys writing and keeps a diary that is featured in the series Betty's Diary. She wants to be a famous writer someday, an aspiration that her teacher Miss Grundy approves of and encourages. She submits her work to writing magazines and has been published a number of times. She once got to be an intern for a fashion magazine but ended up modeling as well. At the same time, she takes various types of employment, including some work as a mechanic, which is also a career that she is interested in. In some stories she finds employment as an assistant teacher at the local elementary school. Betty is also a well-known babysitter and baker.

== Reception ==
In 2011, Betty Cooper was ranked 66th in Comics Buyer's Guide's "100 Sexiest Women in Comics" list written by Brent Frankenhoff.

In a 2016 character profile, IGN described Betty as an "eager-to-please, wholesome and studious" girl with a "super-crush on longtime best bud, Archie.".

== Other versions ==
=== Jughead: The Hunger ===
In Jughead: The Hunger, Betty hails from a long-line of werewolf hunters that have always taken down the Jones werewolves. She only befriended Archie and faked her affections towards him in an effort to get closer to the newest werewolf of Riverdale, Jughead. Archie convinces her to try curing Jughead with wolfsbane, which initially works until it wears off and results in Reggie's death and resurrection/metamorphosis. Jughead leaves town because he knows Betty won't give him a second chance. Betty sets out to find him with the help of Archie and her cousin Bo, with backing by her aunt, the Cooper family matriarch, Elena.

=== Life with Archie: The Married Life ===
Betty appears as a main character in Life with Archie: The Married Life. In Archie Loves Veronica, she runs a catering business while her boyfriend, Reggie Mantle, runs a repair shop. They both star in a reality show based on their lives. In Archie Loves Betty, she is an English teacher at Riverdale High. However, in both universes, Betty previously worked as a buyer for Saks Fifth Avenue in New York.

== In other media ==
=== Radio ===
- In the 1940s and early 1950s, Betty appeared in the radio show The Adventures of Archie Andrews on the Blue Network, Mutual, and NBC. She was voiced by Rosemary Rice and Doris Grundler.

=== Television ===
==== Animated ====
- Betty appeared in The Archie Show, a 1968 cartoon series produced by Filmation. She also appeared in the various spin-offs The Archie Comedy Hour, Archie's Funhouse, Archie's TV Funnies, The U.S. of Archie and The New Archie and Sabrina Hour produced in the same format. She was voiced by Jane Webb.
- Betty appeared in The New Archies, a 1987 re-imagining of Archie and the gang. Betty was portrayed as a pre-teen in junior high. She was voiced by Lisa Coristine.
- Betty appeared in Archie's Weird Mysteries, voiced by America Young.

==== Live action ====
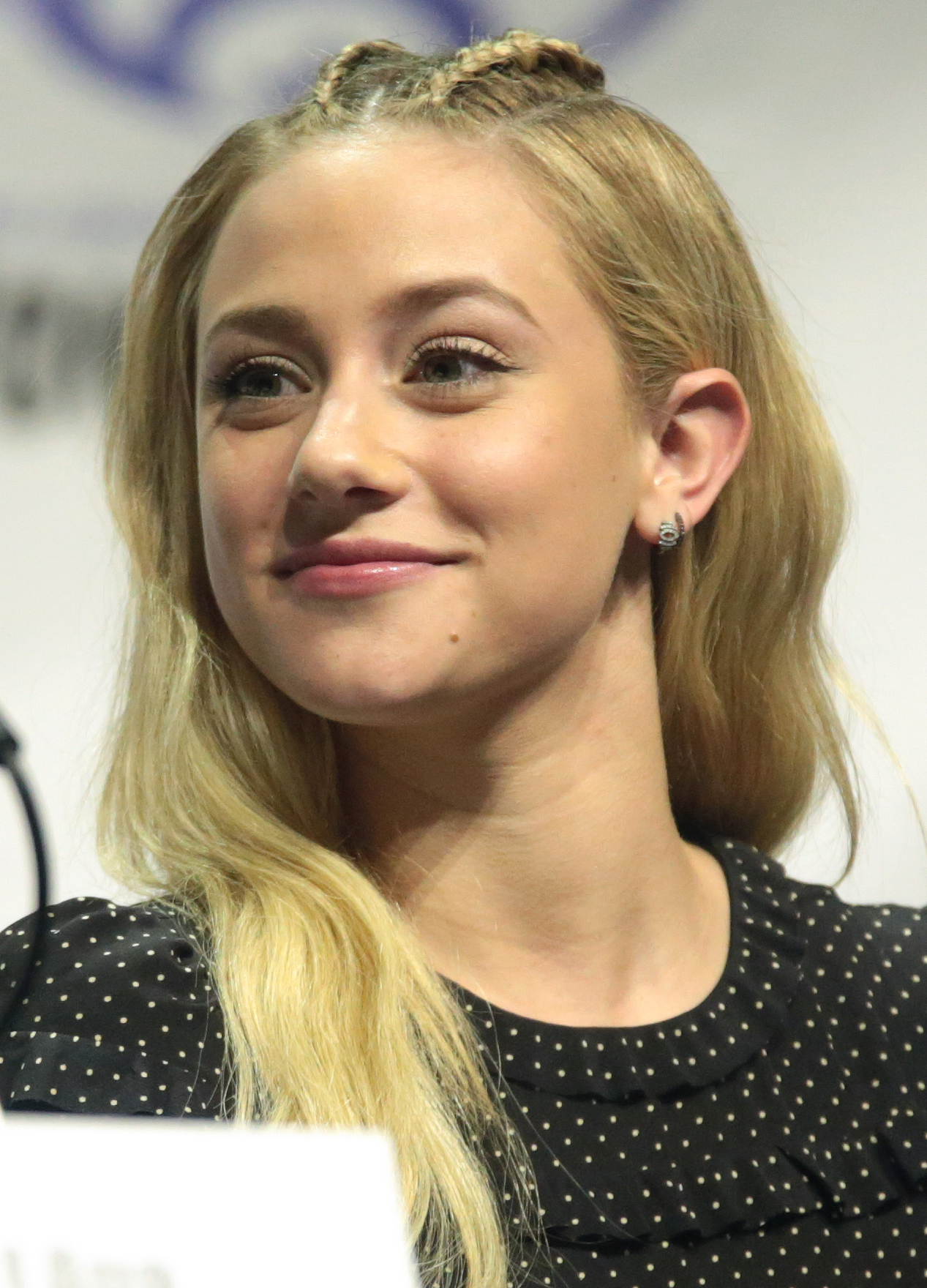
Lili Reinhart plays Betty on Riverdale.

- Betty was portrayed by Lauren Holly in the 1990 TV movie Archie: To Riverdale and Back Again. Since graduation, she has become a grade school teacher and aspiring author, with an abusive boyfriend named Robert. While attending her fifteen-year high school reunion, her old feelings for Archie resurface, as does her friendly rivalry with Veronica.
- Betty appears in The CW series Riverdale, with Lili Reinhart portraying the character. As in the comics, Betty is a good-natured girl-next-door who had a childhood crush on her longtime friend Archie Andrews. She is both less innocent and more driven than her book counterpart, partaking in many investigations. She also has less of a tomboy personality than traditionally portrayed. Betty, as depicted in the television series, also has a darker side referred to as "Dark Betty" in the earlier seasons. Still Archie's next-door neighbor and childhood best friend, she dates Jughead and maintains a friendship with Veronica free from competition over Archie. Years after her breakup with Jughead and leaving Riverdale, she later decides to return to her hometown and initiates a sexual fling with Archie. After leaving school she joins the FBI, becoming "Agent Cooper", one of the show's many references to TV show Twin Peaks. Eden Summer Gilmore plays the young Betty in its first season, while Hannah Bos plays the young Betty in the series' fourth season and sixth season. Michele Scarabelli plays the older Betty in the series' final episode "Chapter Thirty-Seven: Goodbye, Riverdale".
- Betty Cooper and Veronica Lodge, as depicted in the comic series Chilling Adventures of Sabrina, were the basis for the characters of the "Weird Sisters" Agatha, Dorcas, and Prudence Night (respectively portrayed by Adeline Rudolph, Abigail Cowen, and Tati Gabrielle) in the Netflix web television series of the same name.

=== Film ===
- Betty appeared in The Archies in Jugman, voiced by America Young. The direct-to-video film takes place after Archie's Weird Mysteries.
- Gerald Peary's documentary Archie's Betty.
- Betty appeared in an Indianized film adaptation, The Archies, available on Netflix. The role was portrayed by Khushi Kapoor.
