= Groovie Goolies =

Television series

- Title card
- Genre: Comedy horror; Musical comedy
- Directed by: Hal Sutherland
- Voices of: John Erwin; Dallas McKennon; Larry D. Mann; Howard Morris; Larry Storch; Jane Webb
- Theme music composer: Richard Delvy; Ed Fournier; Dick Monda
- Country of origin: United States
- Original language: English
- No. of seasons: 1
- No. of episodes: 16

Production
- Producers: Norm Prescott; Lou Scheimer
- Running time: 30 minutes
- Production company: Filmation

Original release
- Network: CBS
- Release: September 12, 1970 – September 17, 1972

Groovie Goolies is an American animated television show that had its original run Saturday mornings on CBS during the 1970-71. It was rebroadcast the following season on Sunday mornings. Set at a decrepit castle, the show focused on its monstrous but good-natured and mostly friendly inhabitants. Created by Filmation, Groovie Goolies was an original creation of the studio; its characters would cross over with Filmation's Archie Comics adaptations including Sabrina the Teenage Witch and The Archie Show, as well as with the Looney Tunes cast.

== Premise ==
The Goolies were a group of hip monsters residing at Horrible Hall (a haunted boarding house for monsters) on Horrible Drive. Many of the characters referred to each other as cousins. Most of the Goolies were (in look and sound) pop-culture echoes of the classic horror-film monsters created in the 1930s and 1940s, mostly by Universal Pictures. Shows consisted of fast-cut sequences of pun-filled jokes and short skits, and each episode included two pop songs, one performed by The Monster Trio (Drac, Frankie and Wolfie) and a closing number crooned by one of a rotating roster of guest bands.

== Characters ==
- Drac (voiced by Larry Storch) – the short-tempered vampire who is the head of Horrible Hall. He plays the pipe organ in the Groovie Goolies that has arms where the music sheets would go. At the beginning of each episode where the viewer is welcomed to Horrible Hall, Drac in his bat form would try to fly into the window, only to crash into the wall when the window moves. Upon crash-landing, Drac would say "This place is driving me batty".
- Frankie (voiced by Howard Morris) – an easygoing Frankenstein's monster who headed the Muscle-leum Gymnasium. He plays the bone xylophone/drums in the Groovie Goolies. Often would be zapped by lightning, revealing his inner mechanical workings, and then remarking "I needed that!!" Frankie also had a dual identity as the inept superhero "Super Ghoul" (as seen in the song of the same name).
  - Rover – Frankie's pet sauropod-type dinosaur.
- Wolfie (voiced by Howard Morris) – a hippie werewolf that speaks in a combination of beatnik, surfer, and hippie slang. Wolfie plays a lyre-like stringed instrument in the Groovie Goolies and is always seen wearing a T-shirt, shorts, and beach sandals. Wolfie is always out for a good time like running wild, surfing, or driving his Wolf Wagon. He especially gets on Drac's nerves.
  - Fido – Wolfie's pet piranha that eats anything and can fly when necessary.
- Hagatha Hex (voiced by Larry Storch in episodes 1-13, Howard Morris in episodes 14-16) – a plump witch who served as the resident chef. She also has a living broom named Broomhilda and is the aunt of Hauntleroy.
- Bella La Ghostly (voiced by Jane Webb) – a female vampire who works as Horrible Hall's switchboard operator.
- Sabrina Spellman (voiced by Jane Webb) - a witch who is a cousin of the Groovie Goolies.
- Dr. Jekyll and Mr. Hyde (voiced by Howard Morris) – the two-headed resident doctor who often fought as to which one of them was Jekyll and/or Hyde. The right head is a normal "human" doctor while the left head is a green-skinned "monster" doctor. As a result, Dr. Jekyll and Mr. Hyde have their own second opinion.
- Mummy (voiced by Howard Morris) – a bandaged mummy who dabbles in first aid. Mummy serves as the newsman for "The Mummy's Wrap-Up" newscasts. He would often become unraveled.
- Boneapart (voiced by Larry D. Mann) – a skittish skeleton in a Napoleon hat who had a tendency to fall apart.
- Ghoulihand (voiced by Larry Storch) – a giant, talking, disembodied glove.
- Ratso and Batso (voiced by Larry Storch in episodes 1-12, Dallas McKennon in episodes 13-16) – two fanged imp-like brats with a penchant for coming up with plans for swiping treats, as well as playing mean practical jokes that often backfired on them.
- Hauntleroy (voiced by Howard Morris) – a rotund, conniving, selfish and two-faced kid in a sailor suit who was often the primary foil for Ratso's and Batso's tricks. He is the nephew of Hagatha.
- Icky and Goo (voiced by Larry Storch and Dallas McKennon) – two gargoyle-like creatures that seem to be the main pets of Horrible Hall. Icky is a blue gargoyle-like creature while Goo is a red gargoyle-like creature.
- Tiny Tomb – a diminutive, long-haired mummy with a high-pitched voice. He is the nephew of Mummy and the lead singer of the Mummies and the Puppies.
- Missy – an enigmatic mummified spook whose long, pink hair hides her face and body except for one large, blue eye. She is Tiny's wife and a member of the Mummies and the Puppies.
- Mama Casket – a plump green mummy who is a member of The Mummies and the Puppies.
- Orville (vocal effects provided by Howard Morris) – a large thing-eating plant.
- The Spookoo Clock - a cuckoo clock that has a vulture coming out of it.
- The Ask-It Casket - a talking casket that answers any questions given to it.
- The Lovesick Loveseat - a living loveseat that especially has a crush on Drac.
- The Skelevator - an elevator shaped like a large human skull.

=== Musical groups ===
Every episode features two musical segments. The first one is by the Groovie Goolies with Drac on the pipe organ, Wolfie playing a lyre-like stringed instrument, and Frankie on a drum set with a xylophone made of bones. The second musical segment is by one of the other resident bands, including:

- The Bare Bones Band – a band consisting of three living skeletons.
- The Mummies and the Puppies – a folk/pop group led by Tiny Tomb on guitar, with his wife Missy on tambourine, Mama Casket on drums and four puppies (two sharing a guitar, one on tambourine and one on piano).
- The Rolling Headstones – a band consisting of three living tombstones. Their names are Hudson Rock, Captain Marble and General Granite.
- The Spirits of '76 – a band consisting of three ghosts who all wear tri-cornered hats.

== Production ==
Thanks to television airings, the Universal Classic Monsters were having a resurgence of popularity in the 1960s and Filmation producer Lou Scheimer, who had grown up with the films, wanted to create a humorous animated adaptation. In 1968, Scheimer hired Laugh-In writers Jack Mendelsohn and Jim Mulligan to begin developing a show called Monster Inn, which would riff on the characters that Universal had popularized. Although some of their initial ideas fell by the wayside, the groundwork for Groovie Goolies was quickly laid, including having the monsters living together in a castle and the lead trio performing pop songs. Mendelsohn also had been raised with the Universal films, and claimed to have done most of the work on the show, while Mulligan "took the money and ran".

In 1969, Fred Silverman, the Head of Children's Programming at CBS asked for a companion to Filmation's popular The Archie Show, so the company began developing a series for fellow Archie Comics character Sabrina the Teenage Witch, who had already appeared as a supporting character on the show. Silverman was also looking to exploit the overwhelming success of the network's new cartoon Scooby-Doo, Where Are You!, so he optioned Scheimer's monster show, which went through a succession of titles before they settled on Groovie Goolies. Since both shows featured witches, the decision was made to package them together in an hour-long block. Interestingly, monsters had been common to the Archie's Mad House comics, Sabrina's actual origins.

Sabrina and the Groovie Goolies premiered in 1970, featuring two 15-minute segments of Sabrina, and a 30-minute block of Groovie Goolies, with the characters crossing over into both shows. During the inaugural season, it was the highest-rated children's program, receiving a 54% audience share. This incarnation featured a variation of the Goolie Get-Together theme song which announced, "It's time for the Goolies and Sabrina!"

In 1971, CBS split the two shows apart and paired reruns of Groovie Goolies with Tom and Jerry on Sunday mornings in an hour-long animation block, beginning on September 12. It was at this point that the more common Goolie Get-Together opening credits sequence was created, consisting of a montage of scenes from the song The Monster Trio. After a single season on Sundays, the show was canceled.

Despite the cancellation, CBS was not done with the Groovie Goolies yet. In 1972, they were bumped up to regulars on Sabrina the Teenage Witch, appearing in half of that season's episodes, which continued to be rerun until 1974. That same year, they also appeared on rival network ABC in a film entitled Daffy Duck and Porky Pig Meet the Groovie Goolies (which was part of The ABC Saturday Superstar Movie), teaming them with the Looney Tunes characters. This film also featured a brief, live-action sequence featuring some of the Goolies, including Frankie, Drac, Wolfie and Hauntleroy. ABC later rebroadcast the original series for one season in 1975, both on Saturday and Sunday mornings. The characters made their final original appearances in two episodes of NBC's 1977 series The New Archie and Sabrina Hour, and Frankie was featured in that show's closing credits.

In 1977, the show entered syndication as part of an anthology series entitled The Groovie Goolies and Friends, which featured over 104 half-hour episodes. The Groovie Goolies were packaged with several other Filmation series in shared rotation. The syndication format featured new opening credits and "bumpers" featuring the Goolies interacting with characters from the various shows, while the original end credits for each series was retained. The syndication package included The New Adventures of Waldo Kitty (minus the live-action sequences) (13 shows), Lassie's Rescue Rangers (17 shows), The New Adventures of Gilligan (24 shows), My Favorite Martians (16 shows), and former Uncle Croc's Block segments M.U.S.H. ("Mangy Unwanted Shabby Heroes"), Fraidy Cat, and Wacky and Packy (combined into 18 shows).

In 1978, Filmation planned to produce a Groovie Goolies feature film, but it never came to fruition. In 1984, the company decided to resurrect the property, developing two separate shows. "Fright Camp" was set at a summer camp and would have starred the Junior Goolies, the children of the pre-established Groovie Goolies. A second prospective show was titled The Goolies and would have featured the characters as toddlers. Neither series ever got past the development stage. For their 1986 Ghostbusters cartoon, Filmation borrowed many elements from the show, most notably the Skelevator, and they reused designs and animation of Drac and Bella La Ghostly in the episode "The Girl Who Cried Vampire".

The cartoon aired with the UK version of Hanna-Barbera's Banana Splits in the early 1980s. The show was translated into many languages and was broadcast globally, garnering numerous video releases in Germany and various other countries, spawning tie-in albums in different languages, and the show was so popular in France that the characters were featured on a float in France's 1986 Carnaval de Cholet. The complete series was remastered and issued on DVD in the US in 2006. Since then, various episodes have surfaced on compilation DVDs, and discs have also been issued elsewhere around the globe. In May 2009, re-edited minisodes were released on the streaming site Crackle.

=== Show structure ===
The show was structured very much like the then-popular show Rowan & Martin's Laugh-In, with several short segments of one-liner jokes and riddles. This was most shown by "Weird Windows Time", a take-off on Laugh-In's famous Joke Wall. Every so often, one of the Goolies had a special segment in which they instructed the audience about one thing or another, such as:

- Dracula's Schoolhouse – a school that provides the finer points of (mad) science.
- Hagatha's Bedtime Stories – Hagatha reads a popular fairy tale to Frankie at bedtime, with the other inhabitants in different parts.
- Home Movies – the inhabitants watch the home movies of their past activities.
- The Mummy's Wrap-Up – a news program hosted by Mummy, who reports news revolving around monsters.
- Wolfie's Theater – Wolfie re-enacts a popular fairy tale with some of the inhabitants, while the others watch.

== Episodes ==
The scripts for the shows are untitled; they are differentiated only by episode number. When the series was issued on DVD, episodes were saddled with the title of one of the two featured songs.

No.	Title	Original release date
1	"When I Grow Up"	September 12, 1970
When Drac takes Frankie and Wolfie on a tour of the torture chamber, he gets caught in his own devices; Wolfie revises the story of Little Red Riding Hood and then gives pet tips; Hagatha fights with tumbleweeds; and Hauntleroy gets more of a workout than he bargained for when he jumps on an exercise bike. Music: The Groovie Goolies sing "Monster Cookbook" and The Mummies and the Puppies sing "When I Grow Up".
2	"Population Party"	September 19, 1970
Wolfie runs amok in the Wolf Wagon; Frankie attempts to train Rover, his pet dinosaur; Bella tries to solve Boneapart's dog problems; and Ratso and Batso scheme to swipe Hagatha's pie. Music: The Groovie Goolies sing "One, Two, Three" and the Bare Bones Band sings "The First Annual Semi-Formal Combination Celebration Meet-the-Monster Population Party".
3	"Lights Out"	September 26, 1970
The monsters attempt to recapture Drac's great-uncle; Drac gets a physical; Tiny tries to get people to stop pelting him with shoes; Hagatha enchants her cookie jar; and Frankie helps Drac exercise. Music: The Groovie Goolies sing "Cling-Clang" and the Rolling Headstones sing "Lights Out".
4	"Goolie Garden"	October 3, 1970
The monsters partake in a game of golf; Wolfie accidentally disfigures Mummy and Boneapart; Hagatha battles the Big Green Meanie; and Wolfie gives surfing lessons. Music: The Groovie Goolies sing "Goolie Garden" and the Spirits of '76 sing "Monsters on Parade".
5	"Monster Trio"	October 10, 1970
The monsters clean up Horrible Hall; Boneapart gives Ratso and Batso a lesson in the skeletal system; Tiny asks for Bella's advice about Missy's leering eye; Dr. Jekyll and Hyde tend to Ghoulihand after he suffers an accident; and Hagatha gets locked in a battle of wits with the mailbox. Music: The Groovie Goolies sing "Monster Trio" and the Bare Bones Band sing "Super Ghoul".
6	"Feed the Ghost Some Garlic"	October 17, 1970
The monsters play baseball; Hagatha revises the story of Goldilocks and the Three Bears; Drac presents his ancestors; Ratso and Batso decide to swipe Wolfie's surfboard; and Frankie hounds Hagatha for food. Music: The Groovie Goolies sing "Feed the Ghost Some Garlic" and the Rolling Headstones sing "Midnight".
7	"Frankie"	October 24, 1970
Frankie and Wolfie attempt to perk up Orville; Drac is stalked by the Lovesick Loveseat; Ratso and Batso concoct a slippery scheme; Bella and Drac provide Frankie with lessons in etiquette; and Frankie shows off Rover's training. Music: The Groovie Goolies sing "Frankie" and the Spirits of '76 sing "Be Kind to Monsters Week".
8	"What’s in the Bag?"	October 31, 1970
Drac attempts to teach Ratso and Batso about anatomy, but they decide to give him a lesson in magnetism instead; Frankie runs home movies from the Goolies' childhoods; Ghoulihand helps Wolfie build a garage; and Frankie tries to remove a resilient bush from Hagatha's garden. Music: The Groovie Goolies sing "What's in the Bag?" and the Mummies and the Puppies sing "When the Moon is Full".
9	"Goolie Picnic"	November 7, 1970
Drac takes Sabrina on a tour of the Horrible Hall Museum; Wolfie's Theater puts on a production of The Shoemaker and the Elves; the monsters play a game of tennis; Dr. Jekyll and Hyde attempts to reassemble Boneapart; and Frankie leads the Gool Scout troop. Music: The Groovie Goolies sing "Goolie Picnic" and The Spirits of '76 sing "Little Texas Goolie".
10	"Where You Going, Little Ghoul?"	November 14, 1970
Hagatha reads Frankie the story of Hansel and Gretel; Drac learns that it is his unlucky day; Hauntleroy gets caught in the crossfire when Ratso and Batso slurp Hagatha's soup out from under her nose; Mummy reports on King Kong and Fay May's engagement; and Wolfie and Boneapart scuba-dive for sunken treasure. Music: The Groovie Goolies sing "Noises" and the Mummies and the Puppies sing "Where You Going, Little Ghoul?".
11	"Gool School"	November 21, 1970
Drac and Frankie try to protect Wolfie when he falls ill with the Transylvanian Trance and sleepwalks through Horrible Hall; Frankie runs home movies from his childhood birthday party; a ghost trombonist seeks advice from Bella; Ghoulihand guards Hagatha's pie; and Hagatha buys a flying vacuum cleaner to replace Broomhilda. Music: The Groovie Goolies sing "Gool School" and the Bare Bones Band sings "Bumble Goolie".
12	"Save Your Good Lovin' for Me"	November 28, 1970
The Goolies play football; Ratso and Batso run amok with a gas called Weird-ium; Wolfie receives a tropical paradise vacation sample; Ghoulihand tries to cheer up the homesick Mummy; and Frankie visits Dr. Jekyll and Hyde. Music: The Groovie Goolies sing "Save Your Good Lovin' for Me" and the Rolling Headstones sing "Chick-A-Boom (Don't Ya Jes' Love It)".
13	"Darlin’ Darlin’"	December 5, 1970
Frankie disrupts Drac's batuitary gland, rendering him unable to fly, so Wolfie takes them both on a wild ride in the Wolf Wagon; Frankie shows Wolfie how to exercise; Ratso and Batso invent a pancake mist to flatten themselves and sneak into Hagatha's kitchen; and Frankie and Mummy run afoul of a dragon. Music: The Groovie Goolies sing "Darlin' Darlin'" and the Bare Bones Band sings "Kings and Queens". Note: This episode appears out of sequence on The Saturday "Mourning" Collection DVD release.
14	"Shadows"	December 12, 1970
Frankie tries in vain to keep the peace while Drac naps; Hagatha tells Frankie the story of The Gingerbread Boy; the Headless Horseman's horse asks Bella if she can find his head; and Broomhilda gets drunk on fermented spider cider. Music: The Groovie Goolies sing "Shadows" and the Mummies and the Puppies sing "Isn't It a Lovely Night for Scaring?".
15	"Witches' Brew"	December 19, 1970
Bella redecorates Haunted Hall; Wolfie shows Sabrina how he has souped up the Wolf Wagon; Drac runs home movies of the Torture Chamber Music Society's concert; Mummy and Boneapart intervene when Drac throws the Lovesick Loveseat out of the castle; Ratso and Batso put Broomhilda under their spell; and Super Ghoul comes to Hagatha's aid when the Monstrous Mole begins munching her mushrooms. Music: The Groovie Goolies sing "Witches Brew" and The Rolling Headstones sing "Creeper Crawler".
16	"Goolie Swing"	December 26, 1970
The Goolies partake in a track and field event; Drac shows Boneapart his art collection; Frankie goes bird watching; Bella helps a ghost who is too frightened to scare people; Hagatha demonstrates how to prepare broomstick stew; and Super Ghoul attempts to get the Wolf Wagon under control. Music: The Groovie Goolies sing "Goolie Swing" and The Spirits of '76 sing "Listen for the Bells (Goolie Get-Together)". Note: This episode appears out of sequence on The Saturday "Mourning" Collection DVD release.

=== Special ===
Daffy Duck and Porky Pig Meet the Groovie Goolies is a one-off special that aired on The ABC Saturday Superstar Movie.

No.	Title	Original release date
1	"Daffy Duck and Porky Pig Meet the Groovie Goolies"	December 16, 1972
When the Phantom of the Flickers vows to destroy Daffy Duck's entire celluloid career, the Groovie Goolies travel to Hollywood to offer their assistance to the Looney Tunes gang.

=== Sabrina the Teenage Witch ===
Following the cancellation of the show, the Goolies went on to be prominently featured in eight episodes (16 shorts) during the 1972-73 season of Sabrina the Teenage Witch.

No.	Title	Original release date
1	"Rose-Colored Glasses"	September 12, 1970
When Mr. Weatherbee winds up with Aunt Hilda's rose-colored glasses, it is up to the Goolies to get them back.
2	"Living Dolls"	September 19, 1970
Strange things begin to happen when Aunt Hilda shrinks the Goolies down to doll size, and complications ensue when Sabrina's friends encounter these living dolls.
3	"Cake Bake"	September 26, 1970
When Hauntleroy catches wind of a cake-baking contest, he stirs up competition between Hagatha and Aunt Hilda.
4	"Hot Rod Derby"	October 3, 1970
When Wolfie decides to compete in Riverdale's car race, Sabrina gets caught in the middle.
5	"The Bear Facts"	October 10, 1970
Riverdale High's photography class visits the forest just as the Goolies arrive for their own field trip.
6	"Child Care"	October 17, 1970
While babysitting Ratso, Batso and Hauntleroy, Sabrina conjures Dimples the Dragon out of a storybook, but the creature gets loose and finds its way into Riverdale.
7	"Witches Golf Open"	October 24, 1970
Sabrina ropes the Archie gang into caddying for the Goolies during a midnight golf tournament.
8	"Rummage Sale"	October 31, 1970
When the Goolies make a donation to the Riverdale High rummage sale, it causes problems for Sabrina and incites suspicion in Reggie.
9	"High School Drop-Ins"	November 7, 1970
Frankie, Wolfie and Mummy decide to take some classes at Riverdale High.
10	"Big Deal"	November 14, 1970
When Ratso and Batso dogsit for Jughead, Hauntleroy interferes, resulting in Hot Dog growing to the size of a house.
11	"Frankie"	November 21, 1970
Frankie is determined to lend a hand to his friends, but all of his attempts end in disaster, so Sabrina intervenes.
12	"Beached"	November 28, 1970
The Goolies head to the beach on the same day that Archie and his friends decide to go for a swim, so Sabrina tries to keep her friends and her cousins apart.
13	"Ouch"	December 5, 1970
After Mummy turns off Aunt Hilda's loud record, she puts a curse on him that makes music blare from his mouth.
14	"Smog"	December 12, 1970
While Sabrina is babysitting, Ratso and Batso cause smog to pour out of Horrible Hall, so the Archies arrive to investigate.
15	"Dirty Pool"	December 19, 1970
Sabrina and the Goolies take a stand when the Crosstown High Boys pollute the water supply with their car wash business.
16	"The Grayed Outdoors"	December 26, 1970
The Goolies and the Archies each go camping and discover that the Crosstown High Boys have been destroying the forest and erecting a race track.

=== The New Archie and Sabrina Hour ===
The Groovie Goolies made two final appearances in segments of The New Archie and Sabrina Hour.

No.	Title	Original release date
1	"Goolie Sitter"	September 17, 1977
Sabrina babysits Ratso, Batso, Hauntleroy and Hexter.
2	"Cliché Castle"	September 24, 1977
Sabrina attempts to stay out of sight when Reggie and Moose get stranded at Horrible Hall.

== Cast ==
- John Erwin as Additional voices
- Dallas McKennon - Rover, Batso (episodes 13-16), Ratso (episodes 13-16), Goo, Salem, additional voices
- Larry D. Mann as Boneapart, additional voices
- Howard Morris as Frankie, Wolfie, Fido, Hagatha (episodes 14-16), Dr. Jekyll and Hyde, Mummy, Hauntleroy, Orville, "Welcome to Horrible Hall!" narrator, additional voices
- Larry Storch as Drac, Hagatha (episodes 1-13), Ghoulihand, Batso (episodes 1-12), Ratso (episodes 1-12), Icky, additional voices
- Jane Webb as Bella La Ghostly, Sabrina Spellman, additional voices

== Musical releases ==
=== American version ===
Ed Fournier (Wolfie), Jeffrey Thomas (Frankie) and Dick "Daddy Dewdrop" Monda (Drac) with their animated counterparts.

In late 1970 RCA Victor Records released the album Groovie Goolies (RCA LSP 4420). The cover is adorned with two photos of the album's producers/musicians as the live-action Wolfie (Jeffrey Thomas), Frankie (Ed Fournier), and Drac (Dick Monda), as well as a small image of the animated monster trio.

All of the songs on the disc were written by Linda Martin and Sherry Gayden. "We Go So Good Together" and "Spend Some Time Together" are both original compositions that were never featured on the show. The only singles issued from the album were "First Annual Semi-Formal Combination Celebration Meet-the-Monster Population Party" and "Save Your Good Lovin' For Me".

Monda reworked the lyrics of, and re-recorded, an additional song from the series, "Chick-A-Boom (Don't Ya Jes' Love It)", under the pseudonym Daddy Dewdrop in 1971. The tune was included on Dewdrop's self-titled album and a single was released which peaked at #5 on the Cash Box Top 100 singles chart, which landed him on a list of One Hit Wonders at The Rock and Roll Hall of Fame.

No.	Title	Length
1.	"Save Your Good Lovin' for Me"	2:05
2.	"Bumble Goolie"	2:37
3.	"We Go So Good Together"	2:32
4.	"Frankie"	3:03
5.	"Goolie Get-Together (theme song)"	3:17
6.	"First Annual Semi-Formal Combination Celebration Meet-the-Monster Population Party"	3:20
7.	"Spend Some Time Together"	2:22
8.	"Cling, Clang"	2:33
9.	"Goolie Garden"	2:47
10.	"One, Two, Three"	2:10
Total length:		26:46

=== French version ===
In 1983, a tie-in album was issued in France by Magical Ring Records under the show's French title Les Croque Monstres. The only English-language song that was translated into French was the theme song, and a band performed the song to promote the album dressed as the show's characters. The record includes a strange assortment of monster-themed tunes and covers of hits by artists such as Taxxi ("Not Me Girl"), Sylvester ("Do Ya Wanna Funk"), and The Doobie Brothers ("Long Train Runnin'"). The album was reissued on CD in 2013 by Balthazar Music with a slightly different track order.

No.	Title	Writer(s)	Length
1.	"Les Croc'Monstres Au Grand Coeur"	Jen Jiry, Vera Baudey, Dominique Pankratoff	3:03
2.	"Chim Toc Roc"	Vera Baudey, Dominique Pankratoff	2:58
3.	"Les Croque Monstres (a.k.a. "Goolie Get-Together")"	Richard Delvy, Ed Fournier, Dick Monda, Vera Baudey	2:35
4.	"Laissez Faire Le Funk (a.k.a. "Do Ya Wanna Funk")"	Patrick Cowley, Jen Dorial	3:15
5.	"Alleluia (Long Train Runnin')"	Tom Johnston, Guy Buffet	4:20
6.	"Nous Delivrons Les Télégrammes"	Gilbert Grilli, Jen Jiry	3:08
7.	"Pour Le Meilleur Et Pour Le Vampire"	Vera Baudey, Dominique Pankratoff	3:10
8.	"Fais Moi Peur (a.k.a. "Not Me Girl")"	Colin Payne, Guy Buffet, Jeffrey Nead	3:55
9.	"Le Professeur Schlumberger Et La Momie"	Jen Jiry, Gilbert Grilli	2:58
10.	"Joyeux Cauchemars"	Clarel Betsy, Jen Jiry	3:10
Total length:			32:32

=== Czechoslovak version ===
In 1992, Bonton Records issued a pair of albums titled Bubušou 1 and 2. Combined, the two albums include renditions of all 33 of the songs featured on the show, with Czech lyrics adapted by Jiří Josek.

==== Bubušou 1 ====
No.	Title	Length
1.	"Kdo Se Bojí Rád (a.k.a. "Goolie Get-Together")"	1:00
2.	"Jak Se Vaří V Bubu Receptáři (a.k.a. "Monster Cook Book")"	2:53
3.	"Příšerky (a.k.a. "When I Grow Up")"	2:48
4.	"Raz, Dva, Tři (a.k.a. "One, Two, Three")"	2:49
5.	"Umrlecký Mejdan (a.k.a. "First Annual Semi-Formal Combination Celebration Meet-the-Monster Population Party")"	2:50
6.	"Dáreček (a.k.a. "Cling-Clang")"	2:50
7.	"Horůrkov (a.k.a. "Lights Out")"	2:47
8.	"Na Bubu Zahrádce (a.k.a. "Goolie Garden")"	2:49
9.	"Pochodová (a.k.a. "Monsters on Parade")"	2:47
10.	"Slavná Trojka (a.k.a. "Monster Trio")"	2:49
11.	"Supergin (a.k.a. "Super Ghoul")"	2:36
12.	"Dejte Duchům česnek (a.k.a. "Feed the Ghost Some Garlic")"	2:52
13.	"Půlnoc (a.k.a. "Midnight")"	2:46
14.	""Frankie""	2:55
15.	"Bojová (a.k.a. "Be Kind to Monsters Week")"	2:53
16.	"Co V Uzlíku Se Ukrývá (a.k.a. "What's in the Bag?")"	2:45
17.	"Úplněk (a.k.a. "Midnight")"	2:42
Total length:		45:51

==== Bubušou 2 ====
No.	Title	Length
1.	"Piknik (a.k.a. "Goolie Picnic")"	2:50
2.	"Duch Llana Estacada (a.k.a. "Little Texas Goolie")"	2:46
3.	"Zvuky (a.k.a. "Noises")"	2:53
4.	"Kampak Kráčíš Maličká (a.k.a. "Where You Going, Little Ghoul?")"	2:52
5.	"Vzdělání (a.k.a. "Gool School")"	2:47
6.	"Bubák Ňouma (a.k.a. "Bumble Goolie")"	2:46
7.	"Ó Baby, Baby (a.k.a. "Save Your Good Lovin' for Me")"	2:48
8.	"Láska (a.k.a. "Chick-A-Boom (Don't Ya Jes' Love It)")"	2:51
9.	"Houpačka (a.k.a. "Goolie Swing")"	2:53
10.	"Zvony (a.k.a. "Listen for the Bells")"	2:45
11.	"Stín (a.k.a. "Shadows")"	2:51
12.	"Čarokrásně Strašná Noc (a.k.a. "Isn't It a Lovely Night for Scaring?")"	2:51
13.	"Čarodějný Guláš (a.k.a. "Witches Brew")"	2:49
14.	"Housenka (a.k.a. "Creeper Crawler")"	2:50
15.	"Kde Tě Mám (a.k.a. "Darlin', Darlin'")"	2:48
16.	"Králové (a.k.a. "Kings and Queens")"	2:46
Total length:		45:06

== Home video ==
All of the Groovie Goolies' appearances have been issued on video in various regions around the world, with the exceptions of the live-action sequence in Daffy Duck and Porky Pig Meet the Groovie Goolies and the syndicated Groovie Goolies and Friends show.

=== VHS ===
Name	Country	Distributor	Release date	Additional information
Groovie Goolies: Muntere Monster in Hollywood	Germany	Select Video	1983	Daffy Duck and Porky Pig Meet the Groovie Goolies
Los Monsters	Spain	Internacional Videografica	1985	
Groovie Ghouls	UK	Select Video	1985	Daffy Duck and Porky Pig Meet the Groovie Goolies
Groovie Goolies: Haunted Hijinks	US	Embassy Home Entertainment	1985	
Duffy Duck & Co.	Germany	Select Video	1986	Re-release of Daffy Duck and Porky Pig Meet the Groovie Goolies
Groovie Goolies: Geisterstunde in Horrible Hall	Germany	Select Video	1986	
Mis Adorables Monstruitos	Argentina	Buena Onda Home Video	1986	Three episodes
La Familia Monsters	Spain	Record Visióna	1986	
Filmation Children's Cartoon Festival: Groovie Goolies Volume 1	UK	Intervision Video	1988	Three episodes
Filmation Children's Cartoon Festival: Groovie Goolies Volume 2	UK	Intervision Video	1988	Three episodes
Groovie Goolies: Double Feature	US	United American Video	1989	Two episodes
Les Croque Monstres	France	Sunbird Junior	198?	Four episodes
Groovie Goolies: Live from Horrible Hall	US	United American Video	1990	Two episodes
Die Lustige Monster Show: Duffy Duck & Co. in Hollywood	Germany	Select Video	1990	Re-release of Daffy Duck and Porky Pig Meet the Groovie Goolies
Die Lustige Monster Show: Im Horrorschloß	Germany	Select Video	1990	
Die lustige Monster Show: Das Gruselkabinett	Germany	Select Video	1990	
Groovie Ghouls	UK	Kids Kollection	1990	

=== DVD ===
Name	Country	Distributor	Release date	Additional information
Groovie Goolies: The Saturday "Mourning" Collection	US	BCI/Eclipse	October 24, 2006	All 16 episodes of Groovie Goolies presented uncut, restored and digitally remastered, but the original laugh track was removed from some episodes for this release. Additionally, the 13th and 16th episodes were presented in the reverse order of the accompanying scripts. Special features include: "Goolians: A Docu-Comedy" 45 minute "docu-comedy" created by producer and voice-over artist Wally Wingert, featuring interviews with Alice Cooper, Forrest J. Ackerman, Ron Chaney, Lou Scheimer, Bill Corso, and head writer Jack Mendelsohn. Includes new original rock song "True Blue Goolian", and a music video with the Sacramento punk band The Groovie Ghoulies.; Audio commentary from Lou Scheimer for two episodes, "Goolie" head writer Jack Mendelsohn, Filmation historian Darrell McNeil, and Hollywood monster expert Bob Burns. Hosted by Wally Wingert.; Image gallery featuring original model sheets, animation cels, storyboards, backgrounds and PSAs; "Goolie Get-Together Sing-a-Long"; Candid story from producer Lou Scheimer about "The Creation of Filmation"; Trivia and episode guide; DVD-ROM extras, including scripts and the original series bible for The Kookie Spookies
The Frightfully Funny Collection Volume 1	US	BCI/Eclipse	August 12, 2008	Includes the first 12 episodes of the show, as well as 14 episodes of Filmation's Ghostbusters. Special Features: Audio commentaries on "When I Grow Up" and "Population Party".
The Frightfully Funny Collection Volume 2	US	BCI/Eclipse	October 21, 2008	Includes the final four episodes of Groovie Goolies, as well as all 12 segments of Fraidy Cat that were produced and more episodes of Filmation's Ghostbusters.
Mis Queridos Monstruos	Spain	Savor Ediciones Emon	September 23, 2009	Region 2 complete series release, which includes Spanish audio, Spanish and Portuguese subtitles, and all of the special features from The Saturday "Mourning" Collection.
Groovie Goolies	US	Universal Pictures Home Entertainment	July 1, 2012	A best-of sampler featuring five episodes: "Population Party"; "Lights Out"; "What's in the Bag?"; "Goolie Picnic"; "Goolie Garden"
Sabrina the Teenage Witch: The Complete Animated Series	US	Classic Media	July 1, 2012	Includes all 31 episodes of Sabrina the Teenage Witch (a total of 62 shorts), including the 16 segments that feature the Groovie Goolies.
The Archie and Sabrina Surprise Package	Australia	Universal Pictures	June 1, 2016	DVD release of re-edited 30-minute versions of The New Archie and Sabrina Hour. Includes both of the Groovie Goolies' appearances.
Groovie Goolies: The Complete Series	Australia	Unbranded	July 6, 2016	All 16 episodes on two discs. Region 0 formatted to play worldwide.
