= The New Archie and Sabrina Hour =

- Based on: Archie Comics by: John L. Goldwater; Bob Montana; Vic Bloom
- Developed by: Bill Danch; Jim Ryan
- Written by: George Atkins; Dale Kirby; Kathleen Barnes; J. Michael Reaves; Don Glut; Jerry Winnick; Bill Danch; Jim Ryan; David Wise
- Directed by: Don Towsley
- Voices of: John Erwin; José Flores; Dallas McKennon; Howard Morris; Jane Webb
- Ending theme: "Super Witch" (instrumental)
- Composers: Ray Ellis; Norm Prescott
- Country of origin: United States
- Original language: English
- No. of seasons: 1
- No. of episodes: 13

Production
- Executive producers: Lou Scheimer; Norm Prescott
- Producer: Don Christensen
- Editor: Jim Blodgett
- Running time: 60 minutes
- Production company: Filmation

Original release
- Network: NBC
- Release: September 10 – December 3, 1977

Related
- The U.S. of Archie

The New Archie and Sabrina Hour is the seventh and final animated series featuring Archie Comics characters under the Filmation banner., premiering on NBC in September 1977. The show's format featured three segments per episode: a 15-minute one, a 30-minute one, and another 15-minute one—with the segments separated by songs (two songs per episode) and the first segment invariably featuring and emphasizing Sabrina.

Filmation added two new characters into the show: a Latino teenager named Carlos and a robot that Dilton Doiley got from a space center and rebuilt named Q. Carlos only made a few appearances in the comics, beginning in Life with Archie #179 (March 1977). Q was Filmation's nod to Star Wars. At the time, robots were starting to appear everywhere, even on primetime shows.

Low ratings caused the hour-long format to be shelved by October. The show was retooled, then divided into separate 30-minute shows: The Bang-Shang Lalapalooza Show featured Archie's Gang solving mysteries around Riverdale (each 30-minute segment), while Super Witch featured Sabrina solving mysteries using her powers (each pair of 15-minute segments); each show featured one song per episode. The low ratings continued, however, and all three shows were gone by the spring of 1978—thus ending the Archie Comics/Filmation partnership.

The new segments from this show are listed by Entertainment Rights as The Archie and Sabrina Surprise Package.

== Cast ==
- Dallas McKennon as Archie Andrews, Hot Dog, Mr. Weatherbee, Chuck Clayton, Pop Tate, Mr. Lodge, Salem, Ronnie, Clyde, Batso, Goo, additional voices
- José Flores as Carlos
- Howard Morris as Jughead Jones, Moose Mason, Dilton Doiley, Cousin Ambrose, Hexter, Frankie, Wolfie, Dr. Jekyll and Hyde, Mummy, Hauntleroy, Orville, additional voices
- John Erwin as Reggie Mantle, Ratso, Q, additional voices
- Jane Webb as Betty Cooper, Veronica Lodge, Miss Grundy, Big Ethel, Sabrina Spellman, Aunt Hilda Spellman, Aunt Zelda Spellman, Miss Della, Bella La Ghostly, additional voices
- Larry D. Mann as Boneapart, additional voices
- Larry Storch as Drac, Hagatha, Ghoulihand, Icky, additional voices

== Episodes ==
Each hour-long episode was composed of three segments: An Archie short, a Sabrina short, plus a 30-minute Archie episode. Sabrina sometimes appeared in all three cartoons.

No.	Title	Original release date
1a	"Chief Archie"	September 10, 1977
Reggie's reckless behavior causes him to lose the title of Honorary Chief of Police to Archie, and to show him up, Reggie tries to prove that Sabrina is responsible for recent locker room vandalism.
1b	"Alter Ego"	September 10, 1977
Sabrina's mirror-image cousin, Demeana, wreaks havoc upon Riverdale, and Reggie has a particularly unpleasant adventure. After banishing her to the fourth dimension, Sabrina wipes Reggie's memory and asks him on a date.
1c	"French Deception"	September 10, 1977
Dilton attempts to build a translator for Fifi, the new French foreign exchange student, but a jealous Betty and Veronica sabotage the machinery.
2a	"Me and My Shadow"	September 17, 1977
Everywhere that Jughead goes, he's steps behind his cousin Ace, who's impersonating him and pulling pranks on the residents of Riverdale.
2b	"Goolie Sitter"	September 17, 1977
When the Groovie Goolies jot off to the Monster of the Year Awards, Sabrina babysits Hauntleroy, Ratso, Batso, and Hexter. She tries to clean up at Horrible Hall, and then takes the boys bowling and to the park. Everywhere they go, Hauntleroy appears to create pandemonium, when in fact, it's the other three boys tormenting him.
2c	"Dilton's Invention"	September 17, 1977
Dilton puts Q through a series of rigorous tests before taking him to Washington D.C. to compete in a science tournament. Q seems to be a shoo-in to win until a female robot emerges at the competition and steals his heart.
3a	"There Is No Place Like Outer Space"	September 24, 1977
Wonders await the gang at the space center. It's all fun and games, but the situation escalates when they accidentally blast off to the stars in a space station, where Reggie is abducted by chicken-like aliens.
3b	"Cliché Castle"	September 24, 1977
Sabrina attempts to stay out of sight when Reggie and Moose get stranded at Horrible Hall. A storm has put her magic on the fritz, so the teenager is initially unable to fix their car. The boys spend the evening wandering through the castle, encountering a variety of Goolies and ghosts.
3c	"Carlos' Cool Caper"	September 24, 1977
Reggie becomes jealous when everyone fawns over Carlos's mural, which makes him the prime suspect when it's vandalized.
4a	"A Moving Experience"	October 1, 1977
On a field trip to the forest, Moose frightens Miss Grundy by dressing up as Bigfoot. When she doesn't come to school the next day, Archie discovers she's moving and mistakenly assumes she's quit. Thinking the gang is to blame, he attempts to intervene but worsens the situation.
4b	"Witch Picnic"	October 1, 1977
Sabrina suggests that the Archies go on a picnic, not realizing that it's the day when Miss Della and the other witches are having a convention in the Riverdale Woods. After failing to convince both parties to relocate their festivities, Sabrina tries to keep the Archie game safe from harm.
4c	"The Talent Show"	October 1, 1977
For the talent show, Betty, Veronica, and Ethel do a dance; Carlos shows off his frisbee skills; Moose and Reggie perform magic; Archie and Jughead perform a skit; and Sabrina merely spectates. After the show, the gang is swindled by two conmen who are masquerading as Hollywood agents.
5a	"Robert Blueford"	October 8, 1977
Everyone gets bitten by the acting bug when Hollywood heartthrob Robert Blueford comes to town to shoot a movie. Reggie gets fed up with the actor hogging all of the attention, so he hires Blueford to star in the school film with the intention of embarrassing him.
5b	"Moose on the Loose"	October 8, 1977
When Sabrina and Moose swap bodies in the funhouse, Hilda and Zelda work feverishly to reverse the spell.
5c	"Weatherbee-Fuddled"	October 8, 1977
The witches don't like what they hear when Mr. Weatherbee gives a lecture on "Superstitions and Other Nonsense," so they cast a spell on him to make everything he says come true. It starts out fairly harmlessly, but eventually, the witches lose their powers and everyone on earth is transformed into a bird.
6a	"Tops in Cops"	October 15, 1977
At Crime Prevention Week, Reggie is inspired to open a detective agency, and he thinks “the power of positive thinking” is working in his favor - but it turns out that Sabrina's magic has simply rubbed off on him. Things get spooky when the gang investigates a haunted house.
6b	"Pot Luck"	October 15, 1977
Sabrina brings a cauldron to Veronica's to cook chili in, not knowing that it's cursed.
6c	"TV Witch Watchers"	October 15, 1977
Aunt Hilda is appalled by the game show that Sabrina is watching, so she and Aunt Hilda head to the TV station and change all the programming to horror.
7a	"Track and Field"	October 22, 1977
Sabrina accidentally turns Moose into the smartest man in the world. Suddenly, everyone wants him -- especially a sinister pair of foreign thugs in trenchcoats.
7b	"Funny Paper Caper"	October 22, 1977
To punish Reggie for meddling in Sabrina's affairs, Aunt Hilda uses her magic on the Archies, making it seem as if Reggie is to blame.
7c	"Chimp Gone Ape"	October 22, 1977
When Miss Grundy borrows a chimp from the zoo, the Archies find themselves babysitting it over the weekend.
8a	"Where There Is Smoke"	October 29, 1977
During Fire Prevention Week, the gang gets to visit the fire station, and Jughead's pratfalls cause him to get expelled from school - twice!
8b	"Teenage Grundy"	October 29, 1977
Sabrina reverts Miss Grundy to a teenager and passes her off as Geraldine, a new student. Complications ensue when Reggie falls for her.
8c	"Talent Test"	October 29, 1977
When Reggie learns that Jughead is auditioning Hot Dog for a TV commercial, he puts on a dog suit but runs into problems on the way to audition.
9a	"Archie's Millions"	November 5, 1977
A rich golfer bets Mr. Weatherbee and the gang they can't spend a million dollars within 24 hours. If they lose, the principal loses everything, so they try unloading cash in stocks, real estate, art, and other extravagances, but the money keeps multiplying.
9b	"Talking Bird"	November 5, 1977
Moose accidentally injures a bird, so Sabrina revives it and gives it the ability to speak. When Reggie gets wind of the situation, he decides to steal the bird, start an act, and make a ton of cash!
9c	"All Washed Up"	November 5, 1977
The gang starts a car wash. Dilton finds a way to make it more efficient utilizing computer-age technology, but things go wrong.
10a	"Career Day"	November 12, 1977
The kids are placed into jobs. Sabrina and Big Ethel work at a construction site; Reggie and Moose work as moving men; Betty and Veronica work at a beauty salon; Dilton and Q work at a restaurant; Archie mentions he works at a car wash. Later, everyone gets into the act at P.T. Boredom's circus, where Jughead found employment.
10b	"Merlin's Story"	November 12, 1977
While visiting the mediaeval fair, Carlos remarks that he doesn't believe Merlin the magician was real, causing Sabrina to accidentally conjures him up.
10c	"A Colorful Experience"	November 12, 1977
After the gang agrees to paint Miss Grundy's house, Reggie and Moose arrive four hours early in an effort to hog all the credit.
11a	"The Quixote Caper"	November 19, 1977
Lightning interference causes Dilton's genealogy experiment to go awry, whisking Carlos's quixotic ancestor, Don Carlos, away to the present.
11b	"Teenie the Terror"	November 19, 1977
Hot Dog digs up trouble for the Archies when he unearths a lamp containing Teenie, an old magic schoolmate of Sabrina's.
11c	"The Last Windup"	November 19, 1977
Ronnie and Clyde pursue Q through a toy shop.
12a	"Pirate Key"	November 26, 1977
When the gang ends up shipwrecked on Pirate's Island, they find themselves contending with an alligator, parrot, bear, shark, and a pair of ghosts on a hunt for a fabled treasure.
12b	"Cartoonie Loonie"	November 26, 1977
Reggie is upset that his friends won't let him direct an animated film for Miss Grundy's class, so he sabotages the production, and then switches the film for his own cartoon.
12c	"Bon Appetite"	November 26, 1977
The Archies run Carlos's family restaurant while his parents are away in Mexico.
13a	"On the 'Q' Tee"	December 3, 1977
After Reggie embarrasses Veronica at the school dance, Dilton offers to test their compatibility with his computer, but Reggie tries to sabotage the experiment. To get even, Dilton transforms his robot sidekick Q into android Miss Q Tee, who charms Reggie and accompanies him to the next dance.
13b	"Party Pooper"	December 3, 1977
Miss Della tries to get even with the Spellmans for forgetting her birthday, unaware that she's sabotaging her own surprise party.
13c	"Funhouse"	December 3, 1977
An homage to Archie's Funhouse finds Dilton introducing his funhouse-in-a-box, which explodes into a series of rapid-fire gags.

== Home media ==
In the 1980s, New Age Video Inc. released two VHS releases of the syndication version of the format, Archie's Millions and Archie and Sabrina the Teenage Witch.

In 2009, the complete series was released on Region 4 DVD in Australia and New Zealand as The Archie and Sabrina Surprise Package.

== Additional source ==
- Lenburg, Jeff, Encyclopedia of Animated Cartoons, First Edition.
