= The U.S. of Archie =

- Title card
- Genre: Comedy; Historical
- Created by: John L. Goldwater (comic); Bob Montana (characters)
- Based on: Archie Andrews by: John L. Goldwater; Bob Montana; Vic Bloom
- Directed by: Hal Sutherland
- Starring: Dallas McKennon; Howard Morris; Jane Webb; John Erwin
- Voices of: Dallas McKennon; Howard Morris; Jane Webb; John Erwin
- Country of origin: United States
- Original language: English
- No. of seasons: 1
- No. of episodes: 16

Production
- Producer: Norm Prescott; Lou Scheimer
- Running time: 30 minutes (with commercials)
- Production company: Filmation

Original release
- Network: CBS
- Release: September 7 – December 21, 1974

Related
- Archie's TV Funnies; The New Archie and Sabrina Hour

U.S. of Archie is a Saturday morning cartoon show on CBS from September 7 to December 21, 1974. It is spin-off of the popular Archie comic books and television show.

It ran for a total of sixteen episodes, but due to its educational agenda, lacked the music and comedy elements that had made the other Archie cartoons so successful. After spending its first four months on Saturday mornings, it was moved to the less-popular Sunday morning schedule in January 1975, where it remained in repeats until September 1976.

Jackie Mills, a Hollywood producer, produced all of the music for U.S. of Archie. Jackie had also produced Bobby Sherman and the Brady Bunch Kids. The lead singer on U.S. of Archie was Tom McKenzie, who earlier appeared on some of the Groovie Goolies's songs. Tom was a member of the Doodletown Pipers singing group, which also included future Side Effect member Augie Johnson, Oren Waters, Mic "Michele" Bell, Teresa Graves, and Dean Chapman.

Beginning on March 29, 2010, U.S. of Archie started to air on the Retro Television Network.

== Plot ==
The series featured Archie, Jughead, and the other Riverdale High student regulars re-enacting famous scenes throughout American history, taking full advantage of the Bicentennial in the months leading up to it. These re-enactments were termed by Archie during the show to be historical accounts featuring the "ancestors" of the current Archie gang; surprisingly, these ancestors were nearly identical to Archie et al. and were seemingly close friends of famous people in several eras of American history. It was produced by Filmation founders and producers Lou Scheimer and Norm Prescott.

The musical segments appear after the episode ends, which are songs about the covered topic. The characters were slightly re-drawn with new clothing but some of the animations were recycled. The audio of the episodes “Mr. Watson, Come Here” and “The Great Divide” were released as Peter Pan Records 8154 in 1975 but did not include the episode-ending songs.

== Voices ==
- Dallas McKennon – Archie Andrews, Hot Dog, Mr. Weatherbee, Chuck Clayton
- John Erwin – Reggie Mantle
- Jane Webb – Betty Cooper, Veronica Lodge, Miss Grundy
- Howard Morris – Jughead Jones, Big Moose Mason

== Episodes ==
No.	Title	Original release date
1	"The Underground Railroad"	September 7, 1974
2	"Gold"	September 14, 1974
3	"The Day of the Ladies"	September 21, 1974
4	"The Star Spangled Banner"	September 28, 1974
5	"The Wright Brothers"	October 5, 1974
6	"The Roughrider"	October 12, 1974
7	"The Golden Spike"	October 19, 1974
8	"Flame of Freedom"	October 26, 1974
9	"There She Blows"	November 2, 1974
10	"Stay Not These Men"	November 9, 1974
11	"The Giver"	November 16, 1974
12	"Mr. Watson, Come Here"	November 23, 1974
13	"The Crime of Ignorance"	November 30, 1974
14	"The Great Divide"	December 7, 1974
15	"Fulton's Folly"	December 14, 1974
16	"Wizard of Menlo Park"	December 21, 1974
