= Jughead: The Hunger =

Archie Comics horror series

- Cover of Jughead: The Hunger #0 (March 2017). Art by Michael Walsh.

Publication information
- Publisher: Archie Horror; Archie's Madhouse
- Schedule: Monthly-Bimonthly
- Format: Ongoing series
- Genre: Horror
- Publication date: March 2017 – March 2019
- No. of issues: 13 (+1 one-shot)
- Main character: Jughead Jones

Creative team
- Created by: Frank Tieri; Michael Walsh
- Written by: Frank Tieri
- Artist(s): Michael Walsh (#0); Pat & Tim Kennedy (#1-8); Joe Eisma (#2-)
- Inker(s): Bob Smith (#1-8); Jim Amash (#1, 5); Ryan Jampole (#7-8)
- Letterer: Jack Morelli
- Colorist(s): Michael Walsh (#0); Dee Cunniffe (#0); Matt Herms (#1-); Andre Szymanowicz (#5); Kelsey Shannon (#5)
- Editor(s): Victor Gorelick; Mike Pellerito; Jamie Lee Rotante; Alex Segura; Stephen Oswald; Vincent Lovallo

Jughead: The Hunger is an ongoing comic book series published by Archie Horror and Archie's Madhouse, imprints of Archie Comics, beginning in 2017. The story, which takes place outside of the main Archie Comics continuity, focuses on Jughead Jones and his family's dark legacy to explain the sinister origin of his hunger. The one-shot "pilot" was created by writer Frank Tieri and artist Michael Walsh.

In 2019, the series crossed over with fellow Archie Horror staple, Vampironica, in the limited-run comic book series, Jughead: The Hunger vs. Vampironica.

== Publication history ==
Jughead: The Hunger launched on March 29, 2017, as a one-shot comic book alongside the New Riverdale "pilot" lineup. It was written by Frank Tieri, with art by Michael Walsh. Due to positive critical and fan reception, the book was picked up as an ongoing series that July.

It is the first title to debut under the Archie Horror imprint and is its third title overall behind Afterlife with Archie and Chilling Adventures of Sabrina, which released issues before the imprint was created. The series returned with its first official issue on October 25, 2017, under the Archie's Madhouse banner, with Pat & Tim Kennedy taking over as artists. Joe Eisma also joined the series as an artist, beginning with the second issue, providing illustrations for the back half of each issue in order for the series to come out more regularly. Eisma took over as the book's sole artist starting with issue #9.

In October 2018, a 5-issue crossover miniseries with fellow Archie Horror staple Vampironica was announced. The limited series, titled Jughead: The Hunger vs. Vampironica, was written by Tieri and illustrated by the Kennedys. Discussing the story and means of the crossover, Tieri said, "There are no vampires in Jughead: The Hunger. Vampironica, on the other hand, has no werewolves. Now, why is that? What happened in their respective worlds to cause an entire race to be wiped out? Jughead: The Hunger vs. Vampironica answers that question as well as what happens when these elements are reintroduced once again." The first issue was released on April 24, 2019.

== Story arcs ==
=== Volume 1: Run Like a Wolf (Issues #0–3) ===
A serial killer is on the loose in Riverdale and Jughead Jones discovers that, not only is he the killer, but he is also a werewolf. Betty Cooper, who hails from a long line of secret werewolf hunters, is reluctantly convinced by Archie Andrews to try suppressing Jughead's transformations with wolfsbane instead of outright killing him. Months later, Archie and Betty discover the slaughtered body of Reggie Mantle and set out to find Jughead, who has gone on the run. They are backed by the Cooper clan of hunters and their leader, Elena, Betty's aunt. Meanwhile, Reggie, now a werewolf himself, turns other residents of Riverdale and recruits them to get revenge on Jughead.

=== Volume 2: Welcome Home, Jughead Jones (Issues #4–8) ===
Following a battle with the Coopers, Jughead recovers and goes back into hiding as Archie decides he wants to be out of the hunt. Veronica Lodge slaughters Hot Dog and tells Jughead to return to Riverdale where Mr. Weatherbee, another of Reggie's werewolf minions, has kidnapped Jughead's sister Jellybean. Betty and Archie reunite to help Jughead save Jellybean with the aid of the Coopers, who take out Reggie's minions as he and Veronica flee. Betty then convinces Elena to call off her men and leave the Jonses in her care.

=== Volume 3: FrankenMoose Meets WolfJug (Issues #9–13) ===
With the media pinning "The Riverdale Ripper" killings on Reggie and Veronica, the duo goes on the run and Jughead returns to a relatively normal life. Meanwhile, a reporter covering the case interviews Hiram Lodge, who is determined to clear Veronica's name and expose the truth about werewolves in Riverdale. Elsewhere, the victims' bodies disappear from their graves and Betty is kidnapped during her investigation by Milton and his zombified minions, Dilton Doiley and Moose Mason. Milton then manipulates "FrankenMoose" into fighting Jughead in his werewolf form.

== Characters ==
=== Main characters ===
- Jughead Jones, a teenager with an insatiable appetite who discovers that he is "The Riverdale Ripper" serial killer due to his lycanthropic lineage. He goes on the run to escape the Cooper clan of hunters, while struggling to control his werewolf alter ego.
- Betty Cooper, a legacy werewolf hunter who only befriended Jughead's group to monitor the latest Jones werewolf, but eventually grew to care about them. She finds herself torn between loyalties to her friends, her family, and her duty to protect the town.
- Archie Andrews, Jughead's best friend whom Betty feigned affections for to retain her cover. He joins Betty in her search for Jughead, but remains reluctant to hurt him.
- Veronica Lodge, a member of Jughead's group and Betty's "rival" for Archie's affections. Reggie turns her into a werewolf and she joins his crusade against Jughead, whom she blames for Archie running off with Betty.
- Reggie Mantle, an uneasy member of Jughead's group who falls victim to The Riverdale Ripper and is presumed dead, though he instead becomes a werewolf himself. He turns other residents of Riverdale and invites them to join his quest for vengeance against Jughead.

=== Other characters ===
- Elena Cooper, the Cooper family matriarch and Betty's aunt who was in love with Jughead's uncle Jonah when they were teenagers. Killing him propelled her to the top of the family ranks and left her with an extensive facial scar.
- Bo Cooper, Betty's older cousin who is also a werewolf hunter. He joins the hunt for Jughead and trains Archie in combat. He is sidelined due to injuries sustained during a confrontation with Jughead and Bingo.
- Bingo Wilkin, Jughead's cousin who was supposedly killed by The Riverdale Ripper, but actually faked his death to evade the Cooper clan. He sabotages Jughead's attempts at restraint to encourage him to embrace their werewolf identity and disappears following a confrontation with the Coopers.
- Mr. Weatherbee, the principal of Riverdale High School and one of Reggie's recently turned werewolf recruits who is seeking justice against Jughead for Grundy's death. He kidnaps Jellybean to draw Jughead back to Riverdale. He escaped the Coopers, but is reported as being murdered.
- Moose Mason, Jughead's peer and one of Reggie's recently turned werewolf recruits who is seeking justice against Jughead for Dilton's death. He is killed by Elena's hunters, but is risen from the grave as "FrankenMoose" by Milton.
- Cheryl Blossom, Veronica's friend and one of Reggie's recently turned werewolf recruits. She is killed by Elena's hunters.
- Jellybean Jones, Jughead's younger sister who is kidnapped by Mr. Weatherbee as part of Reggie's plan to get revenge against Jughead. She is later revealed to be a werewolf herself.
- Hot Dog, Jughead's dog who joins him on the run. Jughead is almost caught by police while buying dog food. Upon returning to his motel room, Jughead finds that the dog has been slaughtered by Veronica.
- Hiram Lodge, Veronica's wealthy father who is determined to clear his daughter's name and expose the truth about werewolves in Riverdale.
- Milton Doiley, Dilton's doppelgänger "cousin" and the mad scientist responsible for resurrecting the bodies of Dilton and Moose, which transforms the latter into FrankenMoose.

Several other Archie Comics characters make limited appearances. Jughead's first victims Pop Tate and Ethel Muggs appear in photos and flashbacks, while Miss Grundy and Dilton Doiley are illustrated kills. Midge Klump, Jughead's mother Gladys Jones, Archie's parents Fred and Mary Andrews, Kevin Keller, Toni Topaz, Chuck Clayton, Kevin's father Sheriff Keller, and Frankie Valdez make brief appearances. Betty's parents Hal and Alice Cooper appear in Elena's flashbacks, and Jughead's father FP Jones appears in multiple flashbacks as "The Riverdale Reaper" serial killer, who turned all of the Serpents into werewolves and tasked his nephew Bingo with watching over Jughead while he evades the Coopers.

== Reception ==
Jughead: The Hunger has received positive reviews. The series holds an average critic rating of 7.7/10 on the review aggregation website Comic Book Roundup, based on 41 reviews.

The book was picked up for a full arc following the positive reception and success of the one-shot. In his review for IGN, Jeff Lake concluded that the first installment "will leave you hungry for more." David Pepose of Newsarama felt that the series is "trailing behind some of Archie Horror’s more standout offerings," but said that "the premise is solid" nonetheless.

== Collected editions ==
=== Trade paperbacks ===
Volume	Title	ISBN	Release date	Collected Arcs	Issues published	Ref
1	Jughead: The Hunger, Volume One	9781682559017	July 18, 2018	One-shot (#0) "Run Like a Wolf" (#1–3)	March 2017 – January 2018	
2	Jughead: The Hunger, Volume Two	9781682558430	January 23, 2019	"Party Like It's 1988" (#4) "Welcome Home, Jughead Jones" (#5–7) "Werewolves of Riverdale: The Untold Story" (#8)	March – August 2018	
3	Jughead: The Hunger, Volume Three	9781682558270	August 6, 2019	"FrankenMoose Meets WolfJug" (#9–11) "Bingo Was His Name, Oh No" (#12–13)	October 2018 – March 2019	
