= Vampironica =

Archie Comics horror miniseries

- Cover of Vampironica #1 (March 2018). Art by Greg Smallwood.

Publication information
- Publisher: Archie Horror
- Schedule: Irregular
- Format: Ongoing series
- Genre: Horror
- Publication date: March 2018 – June 2020
- No. of issues: 10
- Main character: Veronica Lodge

Creative team
- Created by: Meg Smallwood; Greg Smallwood
- Written by: Greg Smallwood; Meg Smallwood
- Artist(s): Greg Smallwood; Greg Scott
- Letterer: Jack Morelli
- Colorist: Matt Herms
- Editor(s): Victor Gorelick; Alex Segura; Jamie L. Rotante; Stephen Oswald; Vincent Lovallo

Vampironica is an American comic book miniseries published by Archie Horror, an imprint of Archie Comics, beginning in 2018. The story, which takes place outside of the main Archie Comics continuity, focuses on Veronica Lodge as she navigates life after becoming a vampiress. It is written by Greg and Meg Smallwood, with the former also serving as an artist.

In 2019, the series crossed over with fellow Archie Horror staple, Jughead: The Hunger, in the limited-run comic book series, Jughead: The Hunger vs. Vampironica.

== Publication history ==
In March 2015, Archie Comics announced that a new title was in the works for the imprint featuring a significant female character from Archie's past. Written by Megan Smallwood, with art by co-writer Greg Smallwood and lettering by Jack Morelli, Vampironica was announced in December 2017. The series debuted on March 14, 2018.

The title originates from Betty and Veronica #261 (August 2012) by Dan Parent, which debuted the first version of the Vampirella-inspired Vampironica. The name is also mentioned in the first issue of fellow Archie Horror series Afterlife with Archie. In the flagship series, Betty Cooper refers to Veronica Lodge as "Vampironica" in regards to the latter's Vampirella costume.

In October 2018, a crossover miniseries with fellow Archie Horror staple Jughead: The Hunger was announced. The limited series, titled Jughead: The Hunger vs. Vampironica, was written by Frank Tieri and illustrated by Pat & Tim Kennedy. Discussing the story and means of the crossover, Tieri said, "There are no vampires in Jughead: The Hunger. Vampironica, on the other hand, has no werewolves. Now, why is that? What happened in their respective worlds to cause an entire race to be wiped out? Jughead: The Hunger vs. Vampironica answers that question as well as what happens when these elements are reintroduced once again." The first issue was released on April 24, 2019.

== Story arcs ==
Volume 1: First Blood (Issues 1–5)

Riverdale’s resident rich girl Veronica Lodge is turned into a vampiress by another blood sucker hundreds of years her senior. Forced to contend with this new, radical transformation, Veronica must deal with the prospect of feeding on her own small-town cohorts.

Jughead: The Hunger vs. Vampironica

Following her triumph against Ivan and his master, Veronica has to learn to her dismay that she, as well as her parents, were vampires all along. But as she confronts her parents, she and other vampires are whisked away into a parallel world which is dominated by werewolves and where vampires are extinct since the days of the French and Indian War. Veronica joins her friends in that world to combat the rogue vampires.

Vampironica: New Blood (Issues 1–5)

In September 2019 the publication of a new Vampironica mini-series, entitled New Blood, was announced for December the same year. A direct follow-up on the events of Jughead: The Hunger vs. Vampironica, the story follows Veronica's investigation of her newly-revealed ancestor Sir Francis Lodge, the tyrannical vampire who founded her American family line, while at the same time dealing with a new vampiric infestation in her native Riverdale.

== Characters ==
=== Main characters ===
- Veronica Lodge, a cheerleader at Riverdale Senior High who becomes a strigoi (Note: The terms "strigoi" and "moroi" are applied in a different manner in the series than described in Romanian folklore. "Moroi" is used here to name undead vampires, who rise from the grave after having been killed and drained by another vampire, while "strigoi" refers to humans who are infected by vampirism while still alive, and who can exercise mastery over moroi vampires. (Vampironica #2, May 2018)) vampiress after being bitten by Ivan. She protects the people of Riverdale from other vampires as she attempts to break the curse on her and the other victims by destroying the master vampire. In Jughead: The Hunger vs. Vampironica, however, it is revealed that her parents have been vampires all the time, and that she also inherited this dark trait.
- Dilton Doiley, Veronica's highly intelligent schoolmate who, after discovering Veronica's condition, becomes her first confidant and ally in her fight against her vampiric nemesis.
- Archie Andrews, a football player and Veronica's longtime crush who also dates Betty. Upon an untimely visit to the Lodges, where he learns of Veronica's situation, he joins her in combatting the vampiric menace looming over Riverdale.
- Betty Cooper, Veronica's best friend, fellow cheerleader, and competitor for Archie's affections. She eventually joins the fight against the brood of vampires.

=== Other characters ===
- Hiram and Hermione Lodge, Veronica's wealthy parents who apparently become Ivan's first victims and minions as moroi vampires. Later, however, it is later shown that they were vampires all along, and that their conflict with Ivan was part of factional infighting.
- Ivan, a centuries-old strigoi vampire who turns Veronica, her parents, and Reggie into vampires in First Blood. He is affiliated with the medieval Order of the Dragon. It is later revealed that he is not the master vampire when no one becomes human again after he is killed by being plunged into a pool of holy water.
- Dracula, Ivan's patron (not named until after the first series) who is the hidden mastermind behind the vampiric takeover of Riverdale in First Blood and has the power to project hallucinations into an attacker's mind. Eventually, Veronica succeeds in overcoming his illusions and staking him, ending the menace and restoring all afflicted to normal.
- Sir Francis Lodge, a former English privateer, and Veronica and Hiram's ancestor who was the first vampire in the New World and the founding father of Riverdale. His existence was first discovered by Veronica in the reality of Jughead: The Hunger, where he was killed while waging war with werewolves for dominance in the Americas. In the Vampironica reality, however, he has survived into modern times.
- Reggie Mantle, a football player and Veronica's back-up date when Archie has a date with Betty. He was turned into a moroi vampire by Ivan.
- Jughead Jones, Archie's best friend and a friend of Veronica and Betty.
- Cheryl Blossom, Veronica's wealthy frenemy from Pembrooke Estates. She is Jason's twin sister and co-host of the pool party.
- Jason Blossom, Cheryl's twin brother and co-host of the pool party who has a romantic interest in Betty.
- Moose Mason, Midge Klump, and Nancy Woods, Veronica's schoolmates who are all turned into moroi vampires in First Blood.
- Ethel Muggs, Veronica's peer who is present at the pool party attack in First Blood.

== Reception ==
The series has received positive reviews. Justin Partridge of Newsarama said of the debut that it "fully commits to its own wild concept, while still keeping the Archie cast’s core characteristics intact." The series holds an average critic rating of 8.1/10 on the review aggregator Comic Book Roundup, based on 43 reviews.

== Collected editions ==
=== Trade paperbacks ===
Volume	Title	ISBN	Release date	Collected material	Issues published	Ref
1	Vampironica: First Blood	9781682558331	March 13, 2019	Vampironica #1–5	March 2018 – December 2018	
2	Jughead: The Hunger vs. Vampironica	978-1645769736	March 5, 2020	Jughead: The Hunger vs. Vampironica #1-5	April 2019 - October 2019	
3	Vampironica: New Blood	978-1645769521	October 15, 2020	Vampironica New Blood #1-5	December 2019 - June 2020	
