= Archie's TV Funnies =

- Title card
- Genre: Sitcom
- Created by: John L. Goldwater (comic); Bob Montana (characters)
- Based on: Archie Andrews by: John L. Goldwater; Bob Montana; Vic Bloom
- Directed by: Hal Sutherland
- Starring: Dallas McKennon; Howard Morris; Jane Webb; John Erwin
- Country of origin: United States
- Original language: English
- No. of seasons: 1
- No. of episodes: 16

Production
- Producer: Norm Prescott; Lou Scheimer
- Running time: 22–24 minutes
- Production company: Filmation

Original release
- Network: CBS
- Release: September 11 – December 25, 1971

Related
- Fabulous Funnies

Archie's TV Funnies is an American Saturday morning cartoon animated series produced by Filmation which appeared on CBS from September 11, 1971, to September 1, 1973. The series starred Bob Montana's Archie characters, including Archie Andrews, Betty Cooper, Veronica Lodge, Reggie Mantle and Jughead Jones.

Archie's TV Funnies is the fourth incarnation of the Archie cartoon shows, which began in 1968 as The Archie Show and was then retitled The Archie Comedy Hour in 1969 and Archie's Funhouse in 1970.

This was the first show in the popular series to move away from the series' earlier successful formula of comedic segments and musical segments performed by The Archies musical group. Archie's TV Funnies would each week feature Archie Andrews and his friends running a local television station (which bore a close resemblance to the Filmation studios) which would feature short animated adaptations of several classic newspaper comic strips. A typical episode would start with one of the gang reporting on a story that was occurring in Riverdale that day, then several of the animated strips would be shown to the viewing audience as the reporter continued to report the story, and the episode would then conclude with the entire gang appearing at the end of the story. Although the series ran on CBS for two years, it was replaced in 1973 with Everything's Archie which returned the series to its more familiar format.

== Comic strips featured ==
As introduced in the opening sequence, the featured strips are:

- Dick Tracy
- The Captain and the Kids
- Emmy Lou
- Nancy
- The Dropouts
- Moon Mullins
- Smokey Stover
- Broom-Hilda

Some of the above featured comic strips were later adapted again as part of Fabulous Funnies, another Filmation production.

== Voice cast ==
- Dallas McKennon – Archie Andrews, Hot Dog, Mr. Weatherbee, Pop Tate, Mr. Lodge, Sam Catchem, Pat Patton, B.O. Plenty, Flattop, Mumbles, Pruneface, President Pearshape, Alf, Smokey Stover, Hans, Spooky (meowing sounds), der Captain, Chief Cash U. Nutt, Gaylord Buzzard, additional voices
- Howard Morris – Jughead Jones, Moose Mason, Dilton Doiley, Junior Tracy, B-B Eyes, Fritz, Sandy, Moon Mullins, Earl, Irwin Troll, Professor Transo, additional voices
- John Erwin – Reggie Mantle, Dick Tracy, Sluggo Smith, der Inspector, Fritz (some episodes), Alvin, Kayo, Spooky, additional voices
- Jane Webb – Betty Cooper, Veronica Lodge, Miss Grundy, Big Ethel, Tess Trueheart, Moon Maid, Gravel Gertie, Mama, Emmy Lou, Taffy, Nancy Ritz, Fritzi Ritz, Cookie, Hazel Nutt, Broom-Hilda, Breathless Mahoney, additional voices

== Episodes ==
No.	Title	Original release date
1	"Circus"	September 11, 1971
2	"Bank Robbery"	September 18, 1971
3	"Coach Kleats Climbs Mount Riverdale"	September 25, 1971
4	"Escaped Hippo"	October 2, 1971
5	"Flying Saucer"	October 9, 1971
6	"The Ghost of Swedlow Swamp"	October 16, 1971
7	"Mom's Chicken Sickle Stand"	October 23, 1971
8	"Mount Riverdale Woods"	October 30, 1971
9	"Opening of New Fully-Automated Dept. Store"	November 6, 1971
10	"Our Town, Riverdale"	November 13, 1971
11	"Outside Interference"	November 20, 1971
12	"The Reggie Game"	November 27, 1971
13	"Reggie's Soap Opera"	December 4, 1971
14	"Riverdale Talent Tournament"	December 11, 1971
15	"Rodney Rinkydink"	December 18, 1971
16	"Wacky Races, Archie Style"	December 25, 1971
