= Jughead: The Hunger vs. Vampironica =

Archie Comics horror miniseries

- Cover of Jughead The Hunger vs. Vampironica #1 (April 2019). Art by Pat & Tim Kennedy.

Publication information
- Publisher: Archie Horror
- Format: Limited series
- Genre: Horror
- Publication date: April – October 2019
- No. of issues: 5
- Main character(s): Jughead Jones; Veronica Lodge

Creative team
- Created by: Frank Tieri; Pat & Tim Kennedy
- Written by: Frank Tieri
- Artist(s): Pat & Tim Kennedy; Joe Eisma
- Inker(s): Bob Smith; Ryan Jampole
- Letterer: Jack Morelli
- Colorist: Matt Herms
- Editor(s): Victor Gorelick; Alex Segura; Jamie Lee Rotante; Stephen Oswald; Vincent Lovallo

Jughead: The Hunger vs. Vampironica is a 5-issue comic book miniseries published by Archie Horror, an imprint of Archie Comics, in 2019. It was a crossover between the Archie Horror comic book series Jughead: The Hunger and Vampironica. The story, which took place in an alternate reality from the main Archie Comics continuity, follows the werewolf Jughead Jones and vampiress Veronica Lodge, the protagonists of their respective series, as they faced off against one another. The series was created by writer Frank Tieri and artists Pat & Tim Kennedy, who previously worked together on Jughead: The Hunger.

== Publication history ==
In October 2018, a crossover between the alternate reality comic books Jughead: The Hunger and Vampironica, both hailing from the Archie Horror imprint of Archie Comics, was one of two 5-issue miniseries announced by the imprint along with Blossoms 666. The limited series, titled Jughead: The Hunger vs. Vampironica, was written by Frank Tieri and illustrated by Pat & Tim Kennedy, the team that previously worked together on Jughead: The Hunger. Discussing the story and means of the crossover, Tieri said, "There are no vampires in Jughead: The Hunger. Vampironica, on the other hand, has no werewolves. Now, why is that? What happened in their respective worlds to cause an entire race to be wiped out? Jughead: The Hunger vs. Vampironica answers that question as well as what happens when these elements are reintroduced once again." The first issue was released on April 24, 2019.

== Story ==
After eliminating the vampiric threat to humanity, (Note: As depicted in Vampironica, Vol. 1 (March 2019).) Veronica Lodge and her Riverdale cohorts celebrate their victory at Pop's diner. Later, as Pop Tate is closing up, he is ambushed by vampires. Veronica returns to the diner by chance and fights against the attackers, revealing that she still has her vampire powers. Veronica questions how this is possible, and the attackers indicate that the alleged elimination of vampires was really a scam orchestrated by Veronica's parents. Before Veronica can recuperate from their struggle, the vampires disappear into thin air. Veronica visits Dilton Doiley, who confirms that Veronica is still a vampiress. She then goes to her parents for answers, who admit that they did not become vampires the night that they were all bitten, but that "Nosferatu" like them have been in Riverdale for centuries. Before Hiram and Hermione can explain the full history of vampires and their factions, Veronica disappears as well.

Jughead has a nightmare of Veronica as a vampiress leading their friends, also vampires, in eating Jughead in his werewolf state. Just as Betty dismisses his concerns, explaining that there are no vampires, her surveillance equipment senses a break-in at Pop's diner. At the diner, Jughead, Betty, and Archie find Pop Tate out of breath and in tattered clothes. The group wonders how this is possible, as Jughead had previously consumed Pop while in his werewolf state. (Note: As depicted in Jughead: The Hunger, Vol. 1 (July 2018).) They also find bite marks on his neck, but Betty again rebuffs the idea that vampires are involved, revealing that werewolves long ago caused the extinction of vampires in their world. Betty and Archie set out to investigate while Jughead waits with Pop. As Jughead expresses his guilt regarding Pop’s death, Pop attacks Jughead in an attempt to drink his blood. Betty and Archie stumble upon the vampire attackers and prepare to confront them, as does a vampiric Veronica.

== Characters ==
=== Vampironica universe ===
- Veronica Lodge: A young vampiress who, until recently, has been kept in the dark about her wealthy family's supernatural lineage.
- Dilton Doiley: Veronica's intelligent classmate who acts as her confidante and aide in her vampiric endeavors.
- Hiram and Hermione Lodge: Veronica's wealthy parents who are vampires as well.

Veronica's friends Archie Andrews, Betty Cooper, Jughead Jones, and Reggie Mantle also appear.

=== Jughead: The Hunger universe ===
- Jughead Jones: A young werewolf with an insatiable appetite who is estranged from his family's pack.
- Betty Cooper: Jughead's friend and a member of the Cooper clan of werewolf hunters who is tasked with keeping Jughead in line.
- Archie Andrews: Jughead's best friend who aides Betty in keeping Jughead's beastly tendencies in check.

== Reception ==
Jughead: The Hunger vs. Vampironica has received generally positive reviews from professional critics. The series holds an average critic rating of 7.3 out of 10 on the review aggregation website Comic Book Roundup, based on 12 reviews.

In reviewing the debut issue, a number of critics expressed displeasure regarding the absence of the Jughead: The Hunger side of the narrative. However, several of them affirmed the series' potential. Patrick Cavanaugh of ComicBook.com considered the "creepy and campy" issue to be a "strong start" to the series. He gave the first issue a rating of 4 out of 5, writing, "Fans of horror movies and the retro vibe of Archie Comics will find a lot to love in every single panel of this series, with a tone that falls in line with the earlier adventures of Vampironica." In a less positive review, Comics: The Gathering's Nathan Koffler gave the issue a rating of 6 out of 10. However, he praised the work of the "all-star team of artists" for delivering "clear and exciting" action, "satisfying" violence, and a "classic and tropey" depiction of vampires. Reviewing for Multiversity Comics, Robbie Pleasant gave the issue a rating of 7.8 out of 10, concluding, "The story is off to a solid start, building up the plot well and bringing us into the world. The artwork alone sets an appropriate tone for the gore to come, juxtaposed nicely with the beloved cast of Archie Comics."

== Collected editions ==
Title	ISBN	Release date	Story	Art	Collected material
Jughead: The Hunger vs. Vampironica	978-1645769736	March 5, 2020	Frank Tieri	Pat & Tim Kennedy, Joe Eisma	Jughead: The Hunger vs. Vampironica #1-5
