= Archie: To Riverdale and Back Again =

American Live Action Comedy Film

- Genre: Comedy
- Based on: Archie Andrews by: John L. Goldwater; Bob Montana; Vic Bloom
- Written by: Evan Katz
- Directed by: Dick Lowry
- Starring: Christopher Rich; Lauren Holly; Karen Kopins; Sam Whipple; Gary Kroeger
- Theme music composer: Mark Snow
- Country of origin: United States
- Original language: English

Production
- Producer: Graham Cottle
- Cinematography: Frank Byers
- Editors: Byron "Buzz" Brandt; Anita Brandt-Burgoyne
- Running time: 100 minutes
- Production companies: Riverdale Productions and Kent/QMA; Patchett Kaufman Entertainment; DIC Enterprises

Original release
- Network: NBC
- Release: May 6, 1990

Related
- The New Archies; Sabrina the Teenage Witch

Archie: To Riverdale and Back Again is a 1990 American live-action made-for-television comedy film based on comic book characters published by Archie Comics. It was produced by DIC Entertainment and premiered on NBC Sunday Night at the Movies on May 6, 1990. As the comic historically had minimal distribution in the United Kingdom, it was entitled when it aired there as Weekend Reunion.

== Plot ==
Archie Andrews, fifteen years after graduating from Riverdale High, has become a successful lawyer and is preparing to marry his fiancée, Pam, and move to "the big city". Before doing that, however, he returns home to Riverdale for his high school reunion and in an attempt to save his friend Pop Tate's diner.

Archie and company are all now in their early thirties:

- Betty, a grade school teacher, has had problems finding permanent employment, and may or may not have relationship issues.
- Veronica, having lived in France since graduation, has been married (and divorced) four times to very wealthy men.
- Jughead, now a successful psychiatrist, is also divorced (although only once), and now has sole custody of a son named Jordan. Due to the divorce and other failed relationships, Jughead carries emotional baggage that manifests itself in a terrible fear of women. A running gag in the movie is Jughead's desperation to avoid seeing Big Ethel during his visit to Riverdale. This is played for laughs at the end when at the reunion it turns out that Big Ethel is no longer the gangly, awkward teenager she once was but is now a striking beauty and still has a crush on Jughead.
- Moose and Midge have gotten married and become chiropractors. They also have a son, Max, who hits it off with Jordan.
- Reggie is a successful gym owner and owns a car lot.

When Archie sees Betty and Veronica for the first time in fifteen years, all his old feelings for them come flooding back, threatening his engagement—and it does not help that the girls renew their pursuit of Archie, heedless of the fact that he has a fiancée. Meanwhile, Archie also tries to keep Reggie, helped along by an uncharacteristically menacing Mr. Lodge, from evicting Pop Tate from his soda shop, under the pretext of expanding his gym. Hiram Lodge does not want Archie near Veronica and still thinks they are wrong for each other. Archie ultimately saves the Chock'lit Shoppe, though he loses Pam to Robert, whom Betty dumps after growing sick of his bullying, and decides to stay in Riverdale. Veronica, Betty, and Jughead decide to move back to Riverdale as well. Reggie sees the error of his ways and reconciles with his friends as they take a group photo along with Jordan by Pops.

== Cast ==
Almost all of the characters in the movie are regular or recurring characters in the originating comics:

Actor	Role
Christopher Rich	Archie Andrews
Lauren Holly	Betty Cooper
Karen Kopins	Veronica Lodge
Sam Whipple	Forsythe "Jughead" Jones
Gary Kroeger	Reggie Mantle
Jeff Hochendoner	Moose Mason
Debi Derryberry	Midge Mason
Mike Nussbaum	Pop Tate
Fran Ryan	Miss Grundy
David Doyle	Mr. Weatherbee
J. D. Hall	Coach Clayton
Cindy Ambuehl	Ethel Muggs (Big Ethel)
James Noble	Hiram Lodge

Additional characters were mostly created for the movie to indicate the passage of time, such as the regulars' children or new romantic partners:

Actor	Role
Billy Corben	Jordan "Jughead Junior" Jones
Aeryk Egan	Max Mason
Matt McCoy	Robert Miller
Christina Haag	Pam
Christian Hoff	Pop's Worker 1
Robert Munic	Chip

== Production ==
=== Development ===
In July 1989, it was reported that Archie Comics was in negotiations with NBC for a TV movie adaptation of Archie. In March 1990, it was announced that NBC had ordered the film to be aired in Fall of that year.

The movie was made to celebrate the 50th anniversary of Archie as well as serve as a backdoor pilot for a potential ongoing TV series. Evan Katz when offered the writing job had very limited knowledge of the comics only having the vaguest recollection of reading what was available at a barbershop some years back, but eventually found a way of sustaining the two hour runtime by focusing on the love triangle between Archie, Betty, and Veronica and exploring the personal problems of the characters as that's what worked in the original comics. According to Katz, Patchett Kaufman Entertainment hired him after his girlfriend who worked at the company put him in contact. Katz believes he was the seventh writer to work on the project, and at the time Patchett Kaufman Entertainment were about to lose the rights. Katz received word the network needed a finished movie by May which meant Katz wouldn't be able to dive into the comics for research as much as he wanted to. Katz had been forbidden to read comics as a child by his parents after using the phrase "Wait up!" which he had learned from Archie and his parents didn't want him using "slang" language. Ultimately Katz managed to deliver a finished draft of the screenplay within a few weeks.

Dick Lowry had been approached by the producers to direct the film. Lowry's best known work was the television movies he directed featuring Kenny Rogers as a character based on his song The Gambler. While Lowry was hesitant as to whether he was the right person to direct the film, he ultimately decided to take the job as the unfamiliar material was intriguing to him.

Michael Silberkleit, the then publisher and chairman of Archie Comics, said there had been attempts at making a live action Archie for years but other properties were deemed "hotter" and it was only during the late 80s when there was movement back to nostalgia and away from violence that the opportunity presented itself.

Silberkleit described the show and potential series as being in the vein of The Big Chill tackling adult problems of the now 30 year old characters while still maintaining the innocence of the source material. Additional points of comparison were made to the TV series Thirtysomething and The Bradys.

=== Casting ===
Christopher Rich was cast as Archie Andrews having previously starred in the soap opera Another World and as Prince Charming on the fantasy sitcom The Charmings. Rich was hesitant to play Archie fearing becoming Typecast as adult versions of a children's characters, but ultimately after speaking with Lowry, Rich agreed as he enjoyed the prospect of working with him. With the exception of Pop Tate actor Mike Nussbaum who had worked with David Mamet, the remainder of the cast was made up of complete unknowns.

=== Filming ===
Shooting on the film began in March 1990. Prior to filming the rap performance of "Sugar, Sugar", Jughead actor Sam Whipple began experiencing anxiety which he confided in co-star Rich. Rich relayed this to Lowry, afterwards Lowry asked Whipple if he was read. Whipple said yes but asked for any last minute words of advice with Lowry responding "Yeah, don’t fuck up my picture". Ultimately Whipple managed to complete the scene which elicited applause from the cast and crew.

=== Related projects ===
At the same time as development on the film, there were also negotiations with Warner Bros. for a theatrical film version of Archie to be directed by Archie fan Joel Schumacher, as well as plans for an Archie fast-food restaurant specializing in healthy, low cholesterol, low-fat food. The Archie theatrical film was eventually dropped by Warner Bros. and it was picked up by Universal Pictures. Universal assigned development of Archie to Alan Shapiro as writer and director, until management lost interest in the project and reassigned Shapiro to instead write and direct an adaptation of Flipper based on the 60s television series of the same name.

== Reception ==
The NBC movie, broadcast during the May sweeps period, was seen as a pilot for a possible series. It received mixed reviews, though was well received by some critics, who especially praised the casting and performances from the actors. After the film failed to perform in the ratings the planned TV series was scrapped.

The Sun Sentinel complimented the cast while criticizing Evan Katz' screenplay calling it a retread of the The Many Loves of Dobie Gillis reunion movie Bring Me the Head of Dobie Gillis.

Mark Waid, who was working as a proofreader for Archie Comics at the time, saw the pilot first run with his co-workers and the general sentiment was "We just hope the company’s check clears."

Reflecting on his experience directing the film as a positive one, Dick Lowry remarked:

Maybe it’s a picture where all the fun was on set when the cameras weren’t rolling. Maybe we had more fun than the audience.

== Comic book version ==
Archie Comics published a one-shot comic book adaptation of the TV movie which coincided with its premiere. Stan Goldberg and Mike Esposito (two artists who worked on many of the regular Archie issues) drew the sections of the book featuring the characters in flashback as teens, while Gene Colan drew the characters as adults, in a realistic style and more "serious" look akin to Rex Morgan, M.D., and John Byrne drew the cover. The comic also shows a flashback to the incident where Archie and Betty were alone in a motel room together (from Betty and Me #40, February 1972). Back Issue! described the one-shot as "an offbeat, impressive package".

== Release ==
The film premiered on NBC on May 6, 1990.

=== Home media ===
The film was released on VHS in January 9, 1997 from New Horizons Home Video, with the movie re-titled as Archie: Return to Riverdale. In Australia, it was released on VHS as Archie's Weekend Reunion.

The film is also available on Amazon Prime Video.
