= Afterlife with Archie =

Comic book published by Archie Comics

- Cover of Afterlife with Archie No. 1. Art by Francesco Francavilla

Publication information
- Publisher: Archie Comics; Archie Horror
- Schedule: Irregular
- Format: Ongoing series
- Genre: Post-apocalyptic
- Publication date: October 2013
- No. of issues: 10

Creative team
- Created by: Roberto Aguirre-Sacasa; Francesco Francavilla
- Written by: Roberto Aguirre-Sacasa
- Artist: Francesco Francavilla
- Inker: Francesco Francavilla
- Letterer: Jack Morelli
- Colorist: Francesco Francavilla

Afterlife with Archie is a comic book published by Archie Comics beginning in 2013, depicting a zombie apocalypse that begins in the town of Riverdale in an alternative reality. It is written by Roberto Aguirre-Sacasa, with art by Francesco Francavilla, and is inspired by a zombie-themed variant cover which Francavilla did for an issue of Life with Archie.

The comic is Archie Comics' first title to be sold only on the direct market (that is, in comic shops), as opposed to on newsstands; it is also the company's first title not to be aimed at children and is rated "TEEN+", as it includes content and subject matter never explored in any previous Archie title, including extensive realistic violence, some gore, necrotic themes, disturbing scenes, and moderate language. The comic was conceived not long after Archie Comics officially dropped the Comics Code Authority standard from their entire line-up in 2011.

Issue #8 was the first to feature the company's Archie Horror logo. The Archie Horror imprint also publishes four other series: Chilling Adventures of Sabrina, Jughead: The Hunger, Vampironica, and Blossoms 666. The titles share several characters, but they are not directly related to each other.

== Story arcs ==
=== Volume 1: Escape from Riverdale (Issues #1–5) ===
After a car driven by Reggie kills Hot Dog, Jughead asks Sabrina to bring his beloved pet back to life. She does, but with terrible consequences: Hot Dog becomes a zombie, and bites Jughead, who subsequently becomes a zombie and spreads the contagion.

=== Volume 2: Betty: R.I.P. (Issues #6–10) ===
Weeks after Archie and his friends left Riverdale, they are now following along the deserted highways of America trying to stay one step ahead of the growing horde of zombies that were once their friends and family.

This volume was expected to consist of 7 issues (issues #6-#12). However, no new issues of the comic have been released since issue #10 on August 31, 2016. While cover art does exist for issues #11 and #12, they have never been published in single issues or collected editions.

In October 2025, after a live-action series adaptation of the series was announced, Aguirre-Sacasa wrote in his Instagram that issues #11 and #12 have been written, and he was plotting issue #13 as Francavilla resumed drawing duties.

== List of characters ==
- Archie Andrews is Fred and Mary's son and the fiancé of Betty Cooper. He is the main protagonist of the series. As one of the refugee leaders, he tries to hang onto his idealism and humanity, which habitually puts him at odds with Hiram Lodge.
- Mary Andrews is the mother of Archie and the wife of the late Fred Andrews. She is currently in a state of shock due to Archie being forced to beat his father to death to save her.
- Jughead Jones is Archie's best friend and Patient Zero of the zombie outbreak. After being bitten by the zombified Hot Dog, he hid his infection until it was too late and ultimately became the leader of the hordes of Riverdale zombies. His spirit, separated from his body after succumbing, is left to wander until he finds Archie's group (though only Archie can see and hear him), ultimately deciding to travel with them and becoming the third protagonist alongside Archie and Hiram. Since being rendered a spirit, Jughead has also stopped holding his tongue, openly stating various things he was not comfortable saying before.
- Hiram Lodge is the father of Veronica and the second protagonist of the series. He is a widower, as his wife Hermione died some time before the series' beginning due to poor health and her sorrow at Hiram's continued adultery. His mansion serves as the Archie gang's refuge at the beginning of the outbreak, until Jughead leads the Riverdale zombies to it, forcing an evacuation. Hiram is at odds with Archie throughout the series as the two do not hold the same views concerning the zombie outbreak.
- Veronica Lodge is the daughter of Hiram and the late Hermione Lodge. She was once caught up in a romantic love triangle with Archie and Betty, but she has ultimately been rejected due to the engagement of the two.
- Hubert Smithers is the former butler of the Lodge Mansion who still remains loyal to the Lodge family despite the circumstances they face now.
- Betty Cooper is the daughter of the late Hal and Alice Cooper and the fiancée to Archie Andrews. She has a turbulent relationship with an older sister named Polly. Polly's whereabouts are currently unknown.
- Reggie Mantle is the son of the late Ricky and Vicky Mantle and the catalyst for the zombie outbreak. After being beaten up by Moose Mason over Midge, Reggie deliberately runs over Jughead Jones' dog, Hot Dog, who, after being brought back to life, starts the zombie apocalypse. He slowly begins to go mad due to the overwhelming guilt he feels, and becomes desperate to set things right by any means necessary. When he attempts to sacrifice himself to the zombies, Sabrina appears and tells him that he can bring Midge back to life if he kills Betty, which he agrees to do.
- Kevin Keller is the openly gay classmate of Archie and the gang. He is a skilled archer and has received military training from his late father.
- Chuck Clayton is the son of the late Coach Clayton, the former gym teacher of Riverdale High. He is in a relationship with Nancy Woods though he is oblivious to the fact that she is in a secret relationship with Ginger Lopez.
- Dilton Doiley is the smartest of the survivors and has a vast knowledge of horror movies.
- Nancy Woods is the girlfriend of Chuck Clayton who is also in a secret relationship with Ginger Lopez. She is scared to come out as being gay, having doubts that everyone will accept her due to being a black lesbian in an interracial relationship.
- Ginger Lopez is a feisty Latina who is in a secret romance with Nancy Woods. She is shown to be a skilled archer just like Kevin Keller.
- Cheryl "Blaze" Blossom is the twin sister of the late Jason Blossom and the daughter of wealthy businessman Clifford Blossom and his wife Penelope. It is alluded to throughout the series that she and her twin brother were engaged in an incestuous relationship which she was unwilling to continue. She eventually kills her brother when he refuses to let her go, but is allowed to stay after Archie chooses for her to stay after breaking a split vote and after she confides her secret to the other females of the group.
- Sabrina Spellman is a witch and the niece of the Witches of Greendale. She helps Jughead bring Hot Dog back to life and because of these actions she is banished to the Nether-Realm. In issue 6, it is later shown that she has been taken to an institute. After figuring out the true meanings behind the institute, she is tied up as a sacrifice and offered to Cthulhu as his bride. Additionally, Sabrina's aunts Hilda and Zelda, her cat Salem, and boyfriend Harvey Kinkle have all appeared in the series.
- Josie and the Pussycats make a cameo appearance in issue #7, while #10 deals with their origin story all the way up to the beginning of the series. This incarnation of the band are vampiresses who change their identities every decade.

Some of the characters who are either deceased or part of the zombie horde include Hot Dog, Jughead Jones (classified as Patient Zero), Principal Weatherbee, Ms. Grundy, Ethel Muggs, Terry “Pop” Tate, Coach Kleates, Fred Andrews, Archie's dog Vegas, Mayor Martinez, Forsythe and Gladys Jones, Moose Mason, Midge Klump and Jason Blossom. In issue #8 it was revealed that the souls of the dead citizens of Riverdale still roam the Earth as ghosts while their bodies are zombified, implying some greater force - who turns out to be Cthulhu - is controlling their corpses.

Some other characters who have died before the events of the series include Hermione Lodge, Jellybean Jones, Cheryl's dog Sugar, and General Keller.

== Reception ==
The first eight issues sold out. In reviewing the first issue, Lonnie Nadler of Bloody Disgusting wrote, "With its balance of real dread and sugary teen drama, Afterlife with Archie captures the spirit of the best horror flicks of the late 70s." The Plain Dealer's Michael Sangiacomo described the series as "brilliant" as well as "fascinating and wonderful." Jody Arlington at NPR called it "terrific" and a "masterpiece" that is "actually scary." Writing for Salon, Mark Peters said that "If this were a list of the best comics of [2013] rather than the best superhero comics, I’d probably put Afterlife with Archie at the top."

Archie Comics CEO Jon Goldwater has said that his father, the late John L. Goldwater, would have been "shocked by Afterlife (...) but shocked in a great way" regarding the modern incarnations of characters and stories.

Jack Morelli won the 2015 Harvey Award for Best Letterer for his work on the series.

== Collected editions ==
=== Trade paperbacks ===
Title	ISBN	Release date	Story	Art	Collected material
Afterlife with Archie, Vol. 1: Escape From Riverdale	978-1619889088	June 4th, 2014	Roberto Aguirre-Sacasa	Francesco Francavilla	Afterlife with Archie #1–5
Afterlife with Archie, Vol. 2: Betty R.I.P.	978-1619889484	September 24th 2019	Roberto Aguirre-Sacasa	Francesco Francavilla	Afterlife with Archie #6-10
Afterlife with Archie: Deluxe edition	979-8894883144	October 27, 2026	Roberto Aguirre-Sacasa	Francesco Francavilla	Afterlife with Archie #1–10

== Adaptation ==
In July 2026, Disney+ ordered a television series adaptation with Aguirre-Sacasa serving as writer. Executive producers include Aguirre-Sacasa and Jimmy Gibbons via Muckle Man; Greg Berlanti, Sarah Schechter, and Leigh London Redman via Berlanti Productions; and Jon Goldwater via Archie Comics Studios. It is set to premiere on Halloween 2027. In October 2026, Alfonso Gomez-Rejon signed on to direct the first two episodes and executive produce the series.
