= Ethel Muggs =

Archie Comics character

- Archie Comics character
- First appearance: Archie's Pal Jughead #84 (May 1962)
- Created by: Samm Schwartz
- Voiced by: Jane Webb (The Archie Show); Jazzmin Lausanne (The New Archies); Michele Phillips (Archie's Weird Mysteries)
- Portrayed by: Cindy Ambuehl (Archie: To Riverdale and Back Again); Shannon Purser (Riverdale); Aditi Saigal (The Archies)

In-universe information
- Hometown: Riverdale
- School: Riverdale High School

Ethel Muggs is a fictional character frequently featured in Archie Comics. She is a student of Riverdale High School, sometimes known to her schoolmates by the nickname Big Ethel, though this nickname has largely fallen out of use since the 1980s.

She was first drawn by cartoonist Samm Schwartz, probably modeled after a prototype designed by Bill Vigoda for a 1948 Archie Comics story. She has been voiced by Jane Webb, Jazzmin Lausanne, and Michele Phillips. Cindy Ambuehl was the first to play Ethel in live-action, portraying her in the television film Archie: To Riverdale and Back Again, followed by Shannon Purser on The CW's Riverdale, in a recurring capacity, and Aditi Saigal in the Indian teen musical film The Archies.

== History and character ==
Ethel Muggs (originally Ethel Dinklehof) was portrayed in the early era as a tall, gangly, plain-faced, somewhat boy-crazy young woman that had a huge infatuation with Jughead Jones. This was explained in her first appearance in Archie's Pal, Jughead #84 as the result of Dilton Doiley's "Electronic Mate Selector" selecting Jughead as "the perfect mate" for her. She usually resorted to devious means to get Jughead in her clutches, and would typically end up running after him. Ethel has also pursued Jughead by appealing to his appetite; the Betty and Veronica comic title often featured real recipes that Ethel used to make her way to Jughead's heart through his stomach. Earlier issues featuring Big Ethel show her bearing a strong resemblance to Jughead, also, with her prominent nose, dark hair, and angular build. In the late 1980s, Ethel was occasionally drawn with braces on her buck teeth.

Although Ethel is usually portrayed as drab-looking and gawky, one story involving a makeover by Betty Cooper and Veronica Lodge in an attempt to attract Jughead's attention revealed her to be quite curvy and pretty (albeit still with buck teeth). Despite her new look, Jughead was as uninterested as ever.

In the later era, she has been portrayed as an average, decent-looking, somewhat likeable teen girl, whose infatuation for Jughead has been considerably toned down. She now has other interests that keep her mind from Jughead, including Dilton and Archie Andrews, to keep her company. This actually tends to make Jughead a bit jealous. She and Dilton share mutual sympathy due to their few successes with romantic relationships, which is one of the reasons that they occasionally date. She has even been on one memorable date with Archie in one story. That date showed another side of Ethel, where she was funny, smart and attractive. The same story also introduces Hank, a friend of Ethel's who works at a local club Archie and Ethel visit on their date. It is later revealed that Hank was originally a pen pal of Ethel's, and she sent him a picture of Veronica instead of herself because of her low self-esteem. When Hank met Veronica standing in as Ethel, he dumped her because of her vanity. He soon ran into the real Ethel, and told her she was the most exciting girl he has ever met, and that Veronica could not hold a candle to her. When she questions his sincerity, he replies that he does mean it, and she is even more beautiful than Veronica. In another story, a merman (temporarily transformed into a teenage human boy) finds her enchanting due to her inner beauty, giving her self-esteem a huge boost.

Although Jughead drives Ethel away when her affections are too obvious, he can often stand being around her when she keeps her calm. In a storyline that ran in Jughead in the early 1990s, Ethel told Jughead she is tired of chasing him, and begins a romantic relationship with Jeffrey, a blind boy. During this time, Jughead also had a semi-romantic relationship with Anita, a paraplegic African-American teen. Both Jughead and Ethel displayed jealousy at the others' relationship, but the storyline was eventually dropped.

Various stories depict Ethel as a fan of science fiction, art, and trains. She also has a talent for making doll-house furniture, and often works as a babysitter. She is also a fine cook, which is one of the reasons Jughead occasionally submits to being around her. She is fond of dogs, and sometimes uses her attractive female poodle, Clementine, as bait to lure Jughead and Hot Dog.

== Other versions ==
=== Afterlife with Archie ===
In the second issue of the 2013 Archie Horror series Afterlife with Archie, Ethel attends the Halloween dance dressed as Snow White and after an attempted flirtation, a zombified Jughead bites and infects her. When the reanimated Ethel goes after Betty, Veronica blasts and hits the zombie with a fire extinguisher. When she doesn't stay down, the kids realize that a zombie apocalypse is upon them.

=== Archie's R/C Racers ===
In the Archie's R/C Racers series (which takes place outside the regular Archie continuity), Ethel was a member of Archie's team who was traveling across the United States racing radio-controlled cars. She was given her own subplot in the series when she chose to leave Archie's team and join Babette and her henchmen, one of whom had a crush on Ethel and whose feelings were returned. They promised to help Ethel's aspiring country music career. Gradually, she became a starlet, known as "Ethel Sue".

Ethel eventually learned the truth about the trio when Babette convinced her to pose for some publicity photos. Standing in front of a large metal target, Ethel suddenly became strapped to the target and Babette prepared to shoot her with a ray gun, which Ethel believed was a camera. Babette explained that the ray gun was a device that can give the recipient mental powers and she planned on using it on herself after testing it on Ethel. Before she could be zapped, Archie's team saved her. Babette instead zapped a tour guide, who became a villain in the series. Ethel left Babette and returned to Archie's team.

=== Life with Archie: The Married Life ===
Ethel Muggs appears in Life with Archie: The Married Life.

=== Prototypes ===
An early unnamed prototype for the Big Ethel character drawn by Bill Vigoda appeared in Archie Comics #30 (1948). In the story "Patch as Catch Can", Riverdale had a "patch hop"; the girl who could sew her patch on a boy's clothes is his date for the dance. Archie was trying to avoid Betty. While running from her, he found a boy on a tandem, and jumps aboard. He soon realized the boy was actually a very unattractive girl, whom Archie referred to as a "Zombie". Except for her freckles she looks exactly like Ethel with black hair in pigtails, a buck toothed smile, and a tall skinny figure. Archie jumped off the bike, and continued to dodge Betty throughout the story. In the end, he ended up strung from rope tied to a flagpole, and the "Zombie" returned and sewed a patch on Archie's underwear. The story ended with Archie lying on the railroad tracks, saying "It's no use, Jug. This is a much easier way out."

There was also a later character similar to Ethel named Ophelia Glutenschnable. Ophelia was also tall, skinny and dark, but her hair was styled differently, her nose was much bigger, and she usually had no buck teeth. She relentlessly pursued Jughead and all the other boys. In contrast to later stories, Jughead willingly went on dates with Ophelia. In one gag, Archie asks Jughead why he asked Ophelia to the dance, and Jughead replies that she was different: "She's the only one who'll go with me!" Eventually, Ophelia was replaced by Big Ethel.

A separate and unrelated character named "Big Ethel" appeared in Archie's Girls Betty and Veronica #95 (November 1963). This character is a plump, disheveled redhead who chased Jughead. Betty and Veronica gave her a makeover (secured by waist-slimming shapewear) that turned her into a voluptuous beauty; however, her makeover was undone after a sneeze caused the foundation garment to break and her hair and clothing to become a mess. In later reprint stories, the character is renamed "Esmeralda".

== Titles ==
Promo art for Big Ethel Energy by Siobhan Keenan. This art was reused as the cover for the first trade paperback collection, Big Ethel Energy Vol. 1.

Ethel has never had her own self-titled comic book series, but has been a supporting character mainly in the various Jughead series, as well as some of the Betty series, as she has a close friendship with Betty Cooper. She also has solo stories in the various Archie anthology titles. In 1982, she co-starred in the Spire Christian Comics title Archie and Big Ethel.

=== Big Ethel Energy ===
In September 2021, Archie Comics began publishing the digital series Big Ethel Energy, written by Keryl Brown Ahmed with art by Siobhan Keenan, on Webtoon. Like the New Riverdale line, Big Ethel Energy features a more realistic character design aesthetic for Ethel Muggs and the rest of the Archie characters as well as an overarching storyline. Big Ethel Energy earned a Ringo Award nomination for Best Webcomic in 2022. The series concluded in April 2024 after 120 issues, comprising two seasons of 60 episodes each.

Big Ethel Energy is a young adult series following a grown-up and confident Ethel who returns to Riverdale after a decade away to write a history of her hometown for the Mayor of Riverdale. While there, Ethel reunites with Archie, Jughead, Veronica, and Betty, all of whom have changed quite a bit too since she last saw them.

==== Collected editions ====
Title	Material collected	Format	Pages	Released	ISBN
Big Ethel Energy, Volume 1	Big Ethel Energy Season 1, Episodes 1-13	Paperback	200	September 13, 2022	978-1645768890
Big Ethel Energy, Volume 2	Big Ethel Energy Season 1, Episodes 14-26	Paperback	208	March 14, 2023	978-1645768739
Big Ethel Energy, Volume 3	Big Ethel Energy Season 1, Episodes 27-39	Paperback	200	October 24, 2023	978-1645768661

== In other media ==
=== Television ===
==== Animated ====
- Ethel made her television debut in the early Filmation Archie cartoons, most notably in the "How to Catch a Man" segments on Archie's Funhouse, where she is voiced by Jane Webb. Webb went on to voice the character, among several others, in numerous Archie-based television projects from 1968 to 1977.
- Ethel appears in The New Archies, voiced by Jazzmin Lausanne.
- Ethel appears sporadically in Archie's Weird Mysteries voiced by Michele Phillips. This incarnation is visually based on older versions of the character, but like in the newer comics, she also has other interests, such as beekeeping and magic.

==== Live-action ====
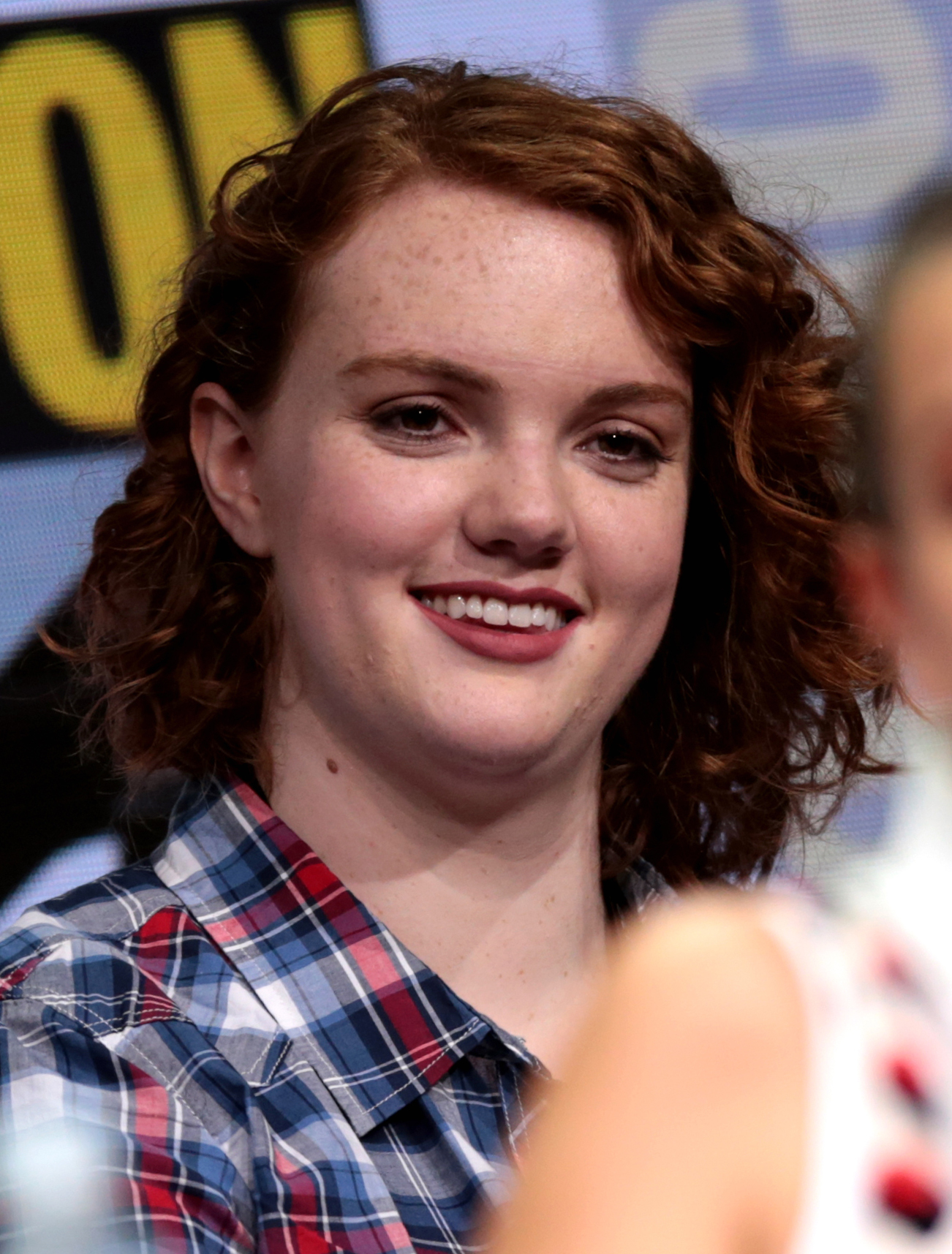
Shannon Purser played Ethel on Riverdale.

- Ethel appears in the 1990 television film Archie: To Riverdale and Back Again, where she is portrayed as an adult by Cindy Ambuehl. Ethel is now a gorgeous fashion model, having been a late bloomer, and still has a crush on Jughead Jones. By the end of the movie, Jughead and his son decide to stay in Riverdale so that he can pursue a relationship with Ethel.
- Ethel was portrayed by Shannon Purser in The CW television series Riverdale, which ran from 2017 to 2023. In the series, Ethel is not shown to be obsessed with Jughead and is actually good friends with his girlfriend, Betty Cooper, and later Veronica Lodge after their shared experiences with harassment by Chuck Clayton. However, in season 3, it is revealed that Ethel is infatuated with Jughead and even convinces him to kiss her while playing a game of Gryphons and Gargoyles.
- Ethel is a supporting charater in Zoya Akhtar's 2023 Indian teen musical film The Archies, where she is played by actress Aditi Saigal. In the movie, Ethel assists Archie, Betty, Ronnie, Reggie, Jughead, Dilton, Moose and Midge in saving the historic "Green Park" from destruction.
