= Moose Mason =

- Archie Comics character
- First appearance: Archie's Pal, Jughead #1 (January 1949)
- Created by: Bob Montana
- Voiced by: Howard Morris (Archie's TV Funnies, The U.S. of Archie); Victor Erdos (The New Archies); Hank Azaria (The Simpsons); Jerry Longe (Archie's Weird Mysteries, The Archies in Jugman)
- Portrayed by: Jeff Hochendoner (Archie: To Riverdale and Back Again); Cody Kearsley (Riverdale)
- Hometown: Riverdale
- School: Riverdale High School

In-universe information
- Significant others: Midge Klump (comics); Kevin Keller (Riverdale)
- Relatives: Jerry and Marilyn Mason

Marmaduke "Moose" Mason (often referred to as Big Moose) is a fictional character in the Archie Comics universe. He attends Riverdale High School where he is typically depicted as the best athlete but the poorest student. His difficulties with school were later attributed to dyslexia. Mason is a Russian-American. The live-action version of Moose is portrayed by Cody Kearsley in Riverdale.

== Character's background ==
Moose is blessed with great strength. In one sequence, he slides under a car and, from his supine position, lifts it off the ground. As a result, people often have high expectations of him regarding athletics. He has helped Riverdale High School win many matches in basketball, baseball, football, ice hockey, and various other sports, though he seems to have a preference for football. Moose was originally created to serve as the personification and stereotype of the jock—all brawn and no brains. In earlier days, whenever Moose talked he would start off with a "D-uh", decades before it became a colloquialism indicating something so obvious that everybody should know it. When Moose says it, however, he is not being sarcastic.

In the Spanish version of the comic, Moose is called Gorilón ("Big Gorilla"). Moose's given real name is Marmaduke Mason. Other names given for Moose through the early years were Francis "Moose" McGonagal, Merton Matowski and Moose McGee in his very first appearance.

His various tendencies may be inherited from one of his first ancestors to immigrate to the United States. In one story, a Russian named Laslo Kharandashikov befriends Archie Andrews's Scottish forefather Andy Andrews when they meet on the same ship immigrating to the US. Laslo protects Andy from another man who wants to thrash Andy. Andy shows gratitude by finding Laslo's immigration money for him after Laslo nearly loses it. Laslo's difficulty in speaking English leads him to give his name as "Mason" to the immigration officials who let him into the country.

In the Archie I stories, where the gang are depicted as prehistoric cave-dwellers, the character is referred to as the Big Fella or the Big Guy. In such depictions, his hair is long and flowing, he wears a fur loincloth and sometimes carries a club.

In earlier stories, there was a similar character called Lunk who had a reddish crew cut and a slightly leaner build.

In some stories one of the gang, usually Archie, asks for Moose's help with a problem that can only be solved by means of the big guy's strength or intimidating presence. In "Guardian Devil," Archie and Betty meet a runaway child whose hospitalized mother left the boy in her brother's care, but the uncle locked the boy in his room and had wild parties in the house—until Archie brought Moose over to straighten things out; after manhandling the uncle, the intimidating Moose sends the partygoers running with the simple exclamation "Scat!". In another story, Archie had tracked down two thugs who robbed the Chok'lit Shoppe, using a description given by Jughead, whom the cops had found in the store and initially accused. The thugs had just started beating Archie when Moose showed up; he picked the thugs up effortlessly and took them to the police station.

While Moose is easily angered and will threaten to hurt those who upset him, he is very kind, loyal, and compassionate. He is always willing to help somebody in need, and he constantly protects his friends from bullies (often without using punches). He also cares for the well-being of animals and small children. In one story, two young children vandalize a classroom in Riverdale High School but Moose takes the blame for them.

Moose is friends with Archie Andrews who is his teammate in sports and very loyal to him, Jughead Jones, Dilton Doiley and Betty Cooper.

== Family ==
Moose is the son of Jerry and Marilyn Mason.

Like most characters, Moose has a sibling who is only featured a few times. Marsha Mason, Moose's freshman sister, is featured in Betty and Veronica Double Digest #20 in "Moose's Sister" (Parts 1 & 2). Marsha starts school at Riverdale High School, and Reggie Mantle began dating her. After two weeks of dating, Moose finds out and beats up Reggie for dating his sister. Marsha has been seen before as a cameo in comics.

In the New Riverdale era, Moose is the oldest of 5. His 4 younger siblings appeared in the Reggie and Me miniseries and the one-shot comic Big Moose.

In one story, Moose's great-grandfather is revealed as Lazlo Kharandashikov. At Ellis Island, afraid of being turned away because of his long name, he gives it as Lazlo Mannson, after a passing ice cream wagon. The official changes this further to Leslie Mason. He departs Ellis Island for Chicago.

In one story Moose is shown to have two large, shaggy hounds as pets.

== Relationships ==
Moose is extremely possessive of Midge Klump, his steady girlfriend, and has time and again flattened anybody (Reggie Mantle is his most frequent victim) who seeks her affection. This possessiveness is at times taken to extremes. He's wary of any male even speaking to her, and has at times assaulted even his best friends, inflicting injuries that should, by all rights, be life-altering. There are times when Midge cannot stand Moose's jealousy and ends up scolding him, but every time he just wants to give Midge some space, she decides that she prefers the old Moose.

He has threatened Archie before for various things, but since he knows that Archie is not anywhere near interested in Midge as a girlfriend, this allows Moose to be more tolerant of Archie. Once, a computer matches Archie and Midge, to Moose's fury, but Archie and Midge both state that they aren't interested in each other except as friends, which allows Moose to cool off. At one point, Archie outright asks permission to date Midge, and Moose declines the request, but it shows that at least Archie has the courtesy to ask him, whereas Reggie will stoop to dating Midge on the sly--which often results in Moose pounding Reggie--as a running gag.

Archie was once able to use Moose's devotion and genuine concern for Midge to help him defeat a gang of robbers who were stealing office electronics from the school. The robbers managed to bind and gag Archie and Jughead and appeared to be getting away, until Archie spotted Moose playing handball on the school grounds through a window. Archie managed to slip a note out the window to Moose saying Midge was the one being held. An angry Moose quickly subdued the gang and freed Archie and Jughead. Rather than being angry over the deception, Moose showed relief that Midge was not in any danger and joked that stopping the crooks was more exciting than playing handball.

Moose has a mean streak in many comics, and spends a lot of time hiding behind park benches inhabited by his girlfriend, Midge. He does this so that whenever somebody comes along to talk to her, he can jump out and beat him up. Often, these are false alarms; someone just happens to be in the wrong place at the wrong time. Also, in earlier days, whenever Moose talked he would start off with a "D-uh", decades before it became a synonym for something so obvious that everyone should know it. When Moose says it, he is not being sarcastic.

== Intelligence ==
It is often said that he consistently scores straight F's (which, at one point, he thought meant Fantastic). Moose's learning difficulties were later revealed to be dyslexia, which made it harder for him to understand what his teachers, such as Miss Grundy, were writing on the chalkboard. However, Moose's friends never want to see him fail and are always willing to help him study. Moose has done better at school when he needs to, and is able to understand complex subjects like algebra if people explain them to him enough—something which nearly drove Reggie Mantle crazy when he acted as Moose's math tutor.

A theme used in many stories is based on the Riverdale High rules that failing students are not allowed to participate in extracurricular activities. At such times, Moose has to pass a makeup test, and proves to have difficulty studying. Coach Kleats and Moose's teammates depend on Moose to help them win most of their games. Moose can always depend on a friend to tutor him, and he almost always passes the makeup test. However, sometimes their efforts backfire, and they do not win the game even if he did pass.

In today's Archie world, Moose isn't as dumb as he appears. He was offered a full football scholarship to a university. When he found out that they wanted to place him into "joke classes" so he would get good grades, he turned down the offer. When asked about it, he replied "I may be dumb, but there's no reason for me to stay dumb." He also briefly dropped out of high school, but returned upon realizing he would need a college education to get the jobs he would like to try.

Despite his limited intelligence, Moose has a deeply sensitive side, which many people do not see. The first person he opens up to is Dilton Doiley. Moose has a deep admiration of Dilton because of his intelligence; Moose calls him his "little buddy" and will go to any length to help the diminutive genius. When Moose feels discouraged by other people's opinions of him, Dilton is the first to stick up for him. In one story, walking through the snow, the two discuss Moose's thoughts and feelings. At this point, Dilton finds that despite what people think of him, Moose has a poetic and philosophical view of certain things.

== Appearance ==
Moose is a large, handsome fellow with a muscular build and blond hair. In early stories, he wears his hair in a crew cut. The more modern version of him sports a shaggier hairstyle.

== Alternate versions ==
In Afterlife with Archie, Moose attends the Halloween school dance when the zombie apocalypse starts. When a zombified Jughead attacks the school dance, he and the others escape to Veronica Lodge's home. They decide to go swimming to take their mind off of things. In private, Midge confides in Moose that she got a cut on her hand during the confusion at the school dance, although she doesn't know from whom. Moose tries to convince her to tell the others but she disinfects the wound and reassures him that she won't turn by saying it would've already happened by now. She curls up with Moose and tells him that she loves him. When next they are seen, Midge and Moose have both turned into zombies and attack their friends who are in the pool. Smithers activates the aluminum pool cover, trapping the two zombified lovers in there.

== In other media ==
=== Television ===
==== Animated ====
- Moose appeared in The Archie Show, a 1968 cartoon series produced by Filmation. He also appeared in the various spin-offs Archie's TV Funnies, The U.S. of Archie and The New Archie and Sabrina Hour produced in the same format. He was voiced by Howard Morris.
- Moose appeared in The New Archies, a 1987 re-imagining of Archie and the gang. Moose was portrayed as a pre-teen in junior high. He was voiced by Victor Erdos.
- Moose appeared in Archie's Weird Mysteries, voiced by Jerry Longe.

==== Live-action ====
- Moose appears in the TV movie Archie: To Riverdale and Back Again, portrayed by Jeff Hochendoner. He and Midge are married with a son and a successful chiropractic business.
- Moose appears in Riverdale, a drama series for The CW, portrayed by Cody Kearsley. In this series, Moose is a bisexual teenager who has a sexual relationship with Kevin Keller and later dates Midge Klump who is supportive of Moose's sexuality.

== Cameos ==
Moose has appeared briefly in The Simpsons episode "Sideshow Bob Roberts", along with Archie, Reggie and Jughead, where they drive up to the Simpsons' house and dump Homer unceremoniously onto the front lawn. Moose then warns Homer to "Stay out of Riverdale!" Later, Homer, while reading an Archie comic, calls them all "stuck-up Riverdale punks".

Moose shows up in Robot Chicken in an Archie spoof of Final Destination, where he fails to save Miss Grundy from a falling car and is tried for and put to death for her alleged murder.
