= Nancy Woods =

- Archie Comics character
- First appearance: Pep Comics #309 (January 1976)

In-universe information
- Significant other: Chuck Clayton
- Hometown: Riverdale
- School: Riverdale High School

Nancy Woods is a fictional character who appears in Archie Comics. A friend of the whole gang, Woods dates Chuck Clayton, a football player at Riverdale High.

== History ==
Nancy was introduced in Pep Comics in 1976, and appeared infrequently. However, she has started appearing in the Archie books more frequently since the late 1990s. Unlike the rest of the gang, she did not appear in animated form before her appearance in Archie's Weird Mysteries. Unlike the other girls in Archie Comics, she has worn her hair in several different styles (in earlier appearances her hair was more often up). In the 2000s, she often wore glasses. Her last name was "Harris" when she first appeared, and has occasionally been "Baker" or "Jackson", but is now officially "Woods".

Nancy loves fashion, shopping, and having girls nights with her friends Betty Cooper, Veronica Lodge and Midge Klump. She goes to Riverdale High, where she is a cheerleader and plays such sports as tennis and softball. She also works on the school newspaper, "The Blue and Gold", as both a reporter and editor. She is also known to be a talented artist, watercolor being her medium.

== Relationship with Chuck ==
Unlike many of her friends, she and Chuck appear to date exclusively with each other. In her early appearances, this was due to Archie Comics considering interracial dating controversial; a series of one-time African-American girls (Georgette, Liza, Gina, etc.), whom Chuck had a crush on, appeared before Nancy was officially his girlfriend's name.

In later stories, their exclusive relationship has been mainly attributed to their preference to be devoted to each other. At times, this has led to conflict. In one story, Chuck's dad Coach Clayton installs a curfew on the basketball team due to poor play. As a result, everybody on the team improves except for Chuck who was sneaking out of the house in order to date Nancy, that is until Archie shows her the error of her ways.

Their relationship is not, however, entirely stable. A frequently used story element is that Chuck pays so much attention to his cartooning or sports, as in earlier stories, that he forgets about Nancy or fails to notice her, thus angering her. Despite being critical of Chuck's obsession, she has an interest and talent in art herself.

In the Afterlife with Archie series, which is not official canon, Nancy dates Chuck, but is revealed to be having a secret romantic relationship with her best friend, Ginger Lopez.

Another non-canon version of Nancy appears in the fourth issue of Chilling Adventures of Sabrina. In this version she's a cheerleader whom Betty and Veronica try to recruit for their Witch coven.

== In other media ==
=== Animated ===
- Nancy makes her animated debut as a minor character in Archie's Weird Mysteries; she is often seen alongside Chuck, though their exact relationship is unclear. Both of them only spoke in the episode "Driven to Distraction", before being relegated to silent cameos throughout the rest of the series.

=== Live action ===
- Nancy Woods appears in Riverdale, a drama series for The CW, as a guest character portrayed by Djouliet Amara in the musical episode "Chapter Ninety-One: The Return of the Pussycats". She is depicted as Melody Valentine's supportive girlfriend.
