= Archie Horror =

Imprint of Archie Comic Publications

- Parent company: Archie Comic Publications, Inc.
- Founded: 2015
- Country of origin: United States
- Headquarters location: Pelham, New York
- Key people: Roberto Aguirre-Sacasa (Archie Chief Creative Officer)
- Publication types: Comics
- Fiction genres: Horror
- Official website: archiehorror.com

Archie Horror is an imprint of Archie Comic Publications, Inc. focusing on the company's horror-related titles. Prior to the creation of the imprint, the titles were published under the main Archie Comics banner.

The titles in the imprint are rated "TEEN+" due to their content and subject matter which include realistic violence, gore, blood, disturbing scenes, and some moderate language. All titles under this imprint are set in alternative realities that are non-canonical from the core Archie series, and each title is independent from the others.

== Publication history ==
=== Beginnings ===
In 2013, Archie Comics announced Afterlife with Archie to be written by Roberto Aguirre-Sacasa and illustrated by Francesco Francavilla. It is the first horror title as well as the first series to be rated "TEEN+" under Archie Comics. The series was partially inspired by the zombie-themed variant cover Francavilla did for Life with Archie: The Married Life. The series launched in October 2013 to critical and commercial success. The first eight issues sold out while some reviewers called it one of the best horror comics to come out in a long time. It won three awards at the 2013 Ghastly Awards for Best New Series, Best Ongoing Title, and Best Colorist for Francesco Francavilla.

In 2014, Archie Comics released Afterlife with Archie #6, which details the whereabouts of Sabrina Spellman who had not been seen since the first issue. The issue was positively received, leading Archie Comics to announce a solo series starring Sabrina in June 2014. The first issue of Chilling Adventures of Sabrina, an occult horror story detailing Sabrina's teenage witch origins in the 1960s, was released in October 2014. As with Afterlife with Archie, the series received critical and commercial success with the first two issues selling out.

=== Creation of imprint ===
In March 2015, Archie Comics announced the Archie Horror imprint due to the successes of Afterlife with Archie and Chilling Adventures of Sabrina. Roberto Aguirre-Sacasa, who is also Archie Comics' Chief Creative Officer, said that "in-house we started referring to these books as the Archie Horror books" so "when it started to look like Afterlife #8 and Sabrina #2 were going to be released around the same time, why don’t we formalize something that is already happening, which is the imprint.”

Chilling Adventures of Sabrina #2 was the first to be released under the imprint in April 2015, followed by Afterlife with Archie #8 in May 2015.

=== Further titles ===
A one-shot titled Jughead: The Hunger was released in March 2017 as part of Archie Comics' "pilot season" for the New Riverdale lineup. The story focuses on Jughead Jones and his family's lycanthropic heritage to explain Jughead's excessive hunger. It was written by Frank Tieri with artwork provided by Michael Walsh. The book was picked up as an ongoing series that July and debuted its first official issue in October with Pat & Tim Kennedy taking over as artists.

In March 2015, along with the announcement of the imprint, Archie Comics revealed that a new title was in the works featuring a "major female Archie character from the past" for the imprint. Written by Megan Smallwood, with art by co-writer Greg Smallwood, Vampironica was officially announced in December 2017 and debuted in March 2018.

Two 5-issue limited series were announced in October 2018. From writer Cullen Bunn and artist Laura Braga, Blossoms 666 features twins Cheryl and Jason Blossom competing for the title of Antichrist. The series released its first issue in January 2019. The second series, a crossover titled Jughead: The Hunger vs. Vampironica features the protagonists of the two respective titles facing off against one another. The series comes from Tieri and the Kennedys and was released in April 2019. Jack Morelli serves as letterer for all six titles.

In February 2026, as part of its new partnership with Archie Comics, Oni Press announced deluxe edition hardcovers for Afterlife with Archie and Chilling Adventures of Sabrina. It marks the first time issues #6-10 of Afterlife with Archie will be collected, following the cancellation of Afterlife with Archie, Vol. 2: Betty R.I.P. trade paperback. A deluxe edition hardcover from Oni Press collecting the first Vampironica miniseries will be released in 2027.

== List of publications ==
=== Ongoing series ===
Title	Issue	Writer	Artist(s)	Colorist	Debut date	Conclusion date
Afterlife with Archie	#1–	Roberto Aguirre-Sacasa	Francesco Francavilla		October 9, 2013	(Note: Afterlife with Archie has been on an indefinite hiatus since August 2016.)
Chilling Adventures of Sabrina	#1–	Roberto Aguirre-Sacasa	Robert Hack		October 8, 2014	(Note: Chilling Adventures of Sabrina has been on an indefinite hiatus since October 2021.)
Jughead: The Hunger	#1–13	Frank Tieri	Pat & Tim Kennedy; Joe Eisma	Matt Herms	October 25, 2017	March 27, 2019
Vampironica	First Blood: #1–5	Meg & Greg Smallwood	Greg Smallwood; Greg Scott	Matt Herms	March 14, 2018	December 12, 2018
Vampironica	New Blood: #1–4	Michael Moreci; Frank Tieri	Audrey Mok; Joe Eisma	Matt Herms; Lee Loughridge; Ryan Jampole	December 4, 2019	June 17, 2020

=== Limited series ===
Title	Issue	Writer	Artist(s)	Colorist	Debut date	Conclusion date
Blossoms 666	#1–5	Cullen Bunn	Laura Braga	Matt Herms	January 23, 2019	July 17, 2019
Jughead: The Hunger vs. Vampironica	#1–5	Frank Tieri	Joe Eisma; Pat & Tim Kennedy	Matt Herms	April 24, 2019	October 9, 2019
Archie Comics: Judgment Day	#1–3	Aubrey Sitterson	Megan Hutchison	Matt Herms	May 22, 2024	July 31, 2024
The Cursed Library	#1–3	Eliot Rahal; Magdalene Visaggio	Craig Cermak	Matt Herms	August 28, 2024	December 18, 2024

=== One-shots ===
- Jughead: The Hunger (March 2017)
- Chilling Adventures of Sabrina Presents: Madam Satan (October 2020)
- Chilling Adventures in Sorcery (December 2021)
- Chilling Adventures Presents: Jinx's Grim Fairy Tales (August 2022)
- Chilling Adventures Presents… Weirder Mysteries (September 2022)
- Chilling Adventures of Salem (October 2022)
- Fear the Funhouse (October 2022)
- Happy Horror Days (December 2022)
- The Return of Chilling Adventures in Sorcery (December 2022)
- Chilling Adventures Presents… Betty: The Final Girl (February 2023)
- Chilling Adventures Presents… Pop's Chock'lit Shoppe of Horrors (March 2023)
- Chilling Adventures Presents… The Cult of That Wilkin Boy (April 2023)
- Chilling Adventures Presents… Jinx: A Cursed Life (May 2023)
- Chilling Adventures Presents… Camp Pickens (June 2023)
- Chilling Adventures Presents… Strange Science (August 2023)
- Chilling Adventures Presents… Madam Satan: Hell On Earth (September 2023)
- Chilling Adventures Presents… Welcome to Riverdale (October 2023)
- Fear The Funhouse Presents… Toybox of Terror (October 2023)
- Chilling Adventures Presents… Pop's Chock'lit Shoppe of Horrors: Fresh Meat (March 2024)
- Chilling Adventures Presents… The Cult of That Wilkin Boy: Initiation (April 2024)
- The Wicked Trinity (June 2024)
- Chilling Adventures Presents… Truth or Dare (July 2024)
- Chilling Adventures Presents… The Nine Lives of Salem (February 2025)

=== Free Comic Book Day ===
- Archie Horror Presents... The Cursed Library (April 2023)
- Archie Horror Presents... The Cursed Library Prelude (April 2024)

== Creative teams ==
The following is a list of main and frequent contributors to publications of the Archie Horror imprint, ordered alphabetically by surname.

	Afterlife with Archie (2013)	Chilling Adventures of Sabrina (2014)	Jughead: The Hunger (2017)	Vampironica (2018)	Blossoms 666 (2019)	Jughead: The Hunger vs. Vampironica (2019)
Roberto Aguirre-Sacasa	Creator, Writer					
Laura Braga					Creator, Artist	
Cullen Bunn					Creator, Writer	
Joe Eisma			Artist		Variant cover artist	Artist
Francesco Francavilla	Creator, Artist	Variant cover artist				
Robert Hack		Creator, Artist	Variant cover artist			
Matt Herms			Colorist			
Pat & Tim Kennedy			Artists			Creators, Artists
Jack Morelli	Letterer					
Greg Scott				Artist		
Greg Smallwood				Creator, Writer, Artist		
Meg Smallwood				Creator, Writer		
Frank Tieri			Creator, Writer			Creator, Writer
Michael Walsh			Creator, Artist, Colorist			

== Collected Editions ==
=== Hardcovers and trade paperbacks ===
#	Title	Material collected	Format	Pages	Released	ISBN
Afterlife with Archie
1	Afterlife with Archie, Vol. 1: Escape From Riverdale	Afterlife with Archie #1–5	TPB	160	June 4, 2014	978-1619889088
2	Afterlife with Archie, Vol. 2: Betty R.I.P.	Afterlife with Archie #6-10	TPB	168	TBA	978-1619889484
Chilling Adventures of Sabrina
1	Chilling Adventures of Sabrina, Book One	Chilling Adventures of Sabrina #1-5	TPB	160	July 27, 2016	978-1627389877
2	Chilling Adventures of Sabrina, Book Two	Chilling Adventures of Sabrina #6-8	TPB	176	TBA	978-1627388030
Jughead: The Hunger
1	Jughead: The Hunger, Volume One	Jughead: The Hunger one-shot, Jughead: The Hunger #1-3	TPB	144	July 18, 2018	978-1682559017
2	Jughead: The Hunger, Volume Two	Jughead: The Hunger #4–8	TPB	144	January 23, 2019	978-1682558430
3	Jughead: The Hunger, Volume Three	Jughead: The Hunger #9–13	TPB	144	August 6, 2019	978-1682558270
Vampironica
1	Vampironica Vol. 1	Vampironica #1-5	TPB	144	April 4, 2019	978-1682558331
1	Vampironica by Greg Smallwood Deluxe Edition	Vampironica #1-5	HC	128	March 23, 2027	979-8894884646
2	Vampironica: New Blood	Vampironica: New Blood #1-4	TPB	120	October 15, 2020	978-1645769521
Blossoms 666
1	Blossoms 666	Blossoms 666 #1-5	TPB	144	November 5, 2019	978-1682557976
Jughead: The Hunger vs. Vampironica
1	Jughead: The Hunger vs. Vampironica	Jughead: The Hunger vs. Vampironica #1-5	TPB	144	March 3, 2020	978-1645769736
Chilling Adventures Presents
1	Archie Horror Presents: Chilling Adventures	Chilling Adventures of Sabrina Presents: Madam Satan, Chilling Adventures in Sorcery, Chilling Adventures Presents: Jinx's Grim Fairy Tales, Chilling Adventures Presents... Weirder Mysteries, Chilling Adventures of Salem, The Return of Chilling Adventures in Sorcery, Happy Horror Days	TPB	160	September 12, 2023	978-1645768593
2	Archie Horror Presents: Terrifying Tales	Chilling Adventures Presents… Betty: The Final Girl , Chilling Adventures Presents… Pop's Chock'lit Shoppe of Horrors , Chilling Adventures Presents… The Cult of That Wilkin Boy, Chilling Adventures Presents… Jinx: A Cursed Life , Chilling Adventures Presents… Camp Pickens, Chilling Adventures Presents… Strange Science, Chilling Adventures Presents… Madam Satan: Hell On Earth	TPB	160	TBA	978-1645768593

=== Oversized hardcovers ===
Title	Material collected	Format	Pages	Released	ISBN
Afterlife with Archie
Afterlife with Archie Deluxe Edition	Afterlife with Archie #1–10	HC	296	October 27, 2026	979-8894883144
Chilling Adventures of Sabrina
Chilling Adventures of Sabrina: Occult Edition	Chilling Adventures of Sabrina #1-8	HC	288	October 15, 2019	978-1682557938
Chilling Adventures of Sabrina: Deluxe Edition	Chilling Adventures of Sabrina #1–9, Chilling Adventures of Salem #1, Archie Horror Presents: The Nine Lives of Salem #1.	HC	240	November 17, 2026	979-8894883489

== Other media ==
In September 2017, it was reported that a live-action Chilling Adventures of Sabrina television series was being developed for The CW by Warner Bros. Television and Berlanti Productions as a companion series to Riverdale, with a planned 2018–2019 release. Lee Toland Krieger directed the pilot, which was written by Roberto Aguirre-Sacasa. Both are executive producers along with Greg Berlanti, Sarah Schechter, and Jon Goldwater. In December 2017, the project moved to Netflix with a two-season order, 10 episodes each. In January 2018, it was announced that Kiernan Shipka has signed on to play the lead role of Sabrina Spellman. The first season of Chilling Adventures of Sabrina was released worldwide on Netflix on October 26, 2018.

On August 20, 2025, Jeff Sneider reported that a new live action series based on Afterlife with Archie was in development by Disney+. By October 2025, the hour-long series had received a script-to-series commitment, with Riverdale creator and Afterlife with Archie writer Roberto Aguirre-Sacasa developing it for the streamer. Aguirre-Sacasa will also executive produce with Jimmy Gibbons, Greg Berlanti, Sarah Schechter , Leigh London Redman, and Jon Goldwater. In July 2026, Disney+ greenlit Afterlife with Archie. The series is slated to premiere in Halloween 2027. In October 2026, Alfonso Gomez-Rejon signed on to direct the pilot and second episode of Afterlife with Archie. He will also serve as executive producer of the episodes.

== See also ==
- Archie's Weird Mysteries
- List of Archie Comics imprint publications
