= Reggie Mantle =

Fictional character

- Archie Comics character
- First appearance: Jackpot Comics #5, Spring 1942 (two panels); Jackpot Comics #6, Summer 1942 (full appearance)
- Created by: John L. Goldwater; Bob Montana
- Voiced by: John Erwin (1968–1976); Sunny Besen Thrasher (1987); Paul Sosso (1999–2002)
- Portrayed by: Gary Kroeger (Archie: To Riverdale and Back Again); Ross Butler (2017, 2021; Riverdale); Charles Melton (2017–2023; Riverdale); Vedang Raina (The Archies)

In-universe information
- Full name: Reginald Mantle
- Nickname: Reggie
- Significant others: Veronica Lodge; Midge Klump; Betty Cooper; Cheryl Blossom
- Relatives: Ricky and Vicky Mantle (parents); Oliver Mantle (brother)
- Nationality: Anglo-American (Comics) Chinese-American (Riverdale)
- Hometown: Riverdale
- School: Riverdale High School

Reginald "Reggie" Mantle is a fictional teenager in stories published by Archie Comics; he is introduced by writer-artist Bob Montana and John L. Goldwater in Jackpot Comics #5 (cover-dated Spring 1942). He also appears in CW's Riverdale. He is the frenemy of Archie Andrews, as well as the bassist of The Archies. The live-action version of Reggie is portrayed by Ross Butler and Charles Melton in Riverdale and Vedang Raina in The Archies.

== Publication history ==
Reggie Mantle debuted in Jackpot Comics #5 (cover-dated Spring 1942). An enduring character, he appears across the Archie Comics line and headlined the series Archie's Rival Reggie (14 issues, 1949 n.d. – Aug. 1954), which returned a decade later as Reggie for the sporadically published issues #15-18 (Sept. 1963 – Nov. 1965). The series was renamed Reggie and Me for issues #19 – #126 (Aug. 1966 – Sept. 1980).

Other series include Reggie's Wise Guy Jokes (55 issues, Aug. 1968 – Sept. 1980), and the three-issue miniseries Reggie's Revenge (Spring 1994 – Spring 1995).

Reggie appears as a main character in the 2015 Archie and Jughead titles that launched the New Riverdale reboot. On 20 September 2016, it was announced that a five-issue miniseries titled Reggie and Me would be published as part of the launch. It was written by Tom DeFalco with art by Sandy Jarrell.

== Fictional character biography ==
Reggie Mantle is arrogant and selfish, and frequently in conflict with Archie, despite their apparent friendship. He is usually depicted as athletic, and is seen as attractive and desirable by girls. He says in one story that he was born in Texas. Reggie's family is upper class, although nowhere near the level of Veronica Lodge; the latter often uses Reggie to make Archie jealous when she is upset with Archie for some reason, which Reggie relishes. In Reggie's debut story, Archie refers to him as, 'that snooty Reggie Mantle', indicating his upper-class background.

Compared to the families of the other main characters, Reggie's family members have made very few appearances in the comics through the decades. His father, Ricky Mantle, owns a newspaper-publishing company, one of his publications is The Riverdale Gazette. (Reggie seems to show journalistic aspirations himself, often working as the editor of the high school paper, Blue and Gold. He is quick to use the term "freedom of the press" to defend controversial or inflammatory articles.) Little is known of his mother, though her name was eventually revealed to be Vicky Mantle. Reggie has a brother, Oliver Mantle, who has appeared in Life With Archie issue #26. His cousin May is often mistaken for a pre-teen. After a makeover, she attracts attention at a school dance, but chooses to dance with Dilton (a short, nerdy boy). Another cousin, Regina, displays Reggie's cruel humor and bullying tendencies, but after a date with Jughead she appears to have enjoyed herself. Reggie also has a number of relatives whom he often uses to get favors.

Reggie has been known to boast that his family is the only one in Riverdale that has its own coat of arms.

== Interests and personality ==
Reggie Mantle's chief characteristics are his love of sarcasm and practical jokes, his vanity, his athletic abilities, and his interest in dating multiple women.

Reggie is a naturally gifted and talented athlete who excels at nearly every major sport, including football, baseball, and basketball, along with more obscure sports such as cross country running and Kung Fu. He often works as a surfing or skiing instructor. Sometimes, if his skills are not enough to secure victory, Reggie cheats, and he often shows little team spirit. Once in a while, Reggie tries to win competitions on a technicality by pulling out a rulebook.

The most common accessories associated with Reggie are the mirror and the comb. A lot of jokes in the comics are about his vanity, earning him the nickname "Reggie 'I-Love-Me' Mantle". Somewhat of a fashion plate, Reggie is the character who most frequently experiments with his hairstyle to match current trends. These looks have lasted months (rather than been contained within a single story) and have included several incarnations of sideburns, pomaded, short, shaggy, and even a ponytail in the early 1990s. Reggie is one of the founding members of the band The Archies, serving primarily as their bassist and occasionally as lead guitarist. He views himself as the most important and talented member of the group—and has gone to great lengths to prove it, such as hiring groupies to scream his name during concerts. Reggie has also demonstrated skill in singing, acting, and piano.

Reggie is Riverdale High's resident prankster. It is not unusual for Reggie's practical jokes to backfire. His pranks are usually meant to embarrass his victims rather than physically hurt them. Reggie's sharp, quick wit has also led him to work part-time as a stand-up comedian at a Riverdale comedy club; he has expressed interest in pursuing a professional comedy career. In spite of his evident upper-middle class status, he is remarkably cheap, and the first time his schoolmates remember him inviting them to a party, he had filled the room with vending machines from which to obtain the party food.

Reggie likes to chase girls, delighting in the pursuit, but is not usually interested in having a serious relationship with one girl. Reggie likes to play the field, and openly describes himself as "a true practitioner of the art". He has expressed horror at the idea of being tied down to one solitary female, saying that, "having one girl is like having one peanut, one potato chip."

Reggie is Archie Andrews's rival, and has a perennial crush on Veronica Lodge. The fact that she loves Archie makes Reggie jealous, so he spends most of his time trying to outwit Archie, and playing practical jokes on him. Despite the rivalry, he and Archie are generally amicable, and often spend time together pursuing dates or practicing athletics. In Archie's Double Digest #201, during the possibility of Archie moving, he eventually admits he would miss Archie, whom he calls his best friend. In certain older Archie Comics stories, Reggie and Archie team up to play pranks on Jughead Jones; however, their schemes usually backfire as Jughead outwits them.

Other than Veronica, Reggie is romantically interested in Midge Klump, the girlfriend of brawny but dimwitted athlete Moose Mason. A running gag in the series features Reggie attempting to spend time with Midge without attracting Moose's anger and jealousy. He occasionally seeks to date other women, including Betty Cooper. Reggie and Betty frequently join forces to try and break up Archie and Veronica. In some stories, Reggie and Betty are shown to be a couple, even though their respective interests still lie with Veronica and Archie; for example, the Life with Archie series portrays a future in which Archie marries Veronica and Betty and Reggie are a loving couple. In other storylines, Reggie has occasionally been known to date Cheryl Blossom. The two have very similar personalities and, at one point, before she dates a boy named George, try going out together. Like Betty and Veronica, however, Cheryl mainly uses Reggie as an alternative to Archie. Another arc features Reggie falling in love with Veronica's cousin Harper and developing a long-distance relationship with her.

Reggie is insanely jealous of anyone else but him being in the spotlight, and will sometimes deliberately cause them trouble to get what he wants.

On certain occasions, Reggie shows a kinder side where he will come to the aid of his friends or total strangers, although he prefers to keep these good deeds secret. In one comic, he has a close childhood friendship with an elderly woman named Mrs. Finklehoff. Due to Reggie's reputation for arrogance and scheming, his peers often distrust his motives even when he is genuinely intending to help someone.

== Alternate versions ==
In Afterlife with Archie, Reggie Mantle caused the zombie apocalypse. Midge asks him for money so she can pay for an abortion. This frustrates and angers him to the point that when he sees Hot Dog on the side of the road he swerves to hit him. He immediately regrets his actions and tries to carry Hot Dog to a vet, failing that, he takes him to Jughead's lawn so that he can die at home. Hot Dog's subsequent reanimation results in him infecting Jughead and starting the zombie apocalypse.

Reggie survives with the others on the road, growing increasingly bitter towards Archie for becoming a natural leader and thriving while he is continually wracked with guilt for starting all this horror. Archie remains oblivious to this, intending to make Reggie the best man at his wedding to Betty. Reggie eventually goes out hunting with Kevin and tells him how he caused the apocalypse, how he killed Hot Dog, how he fears he might be a sociopath and how he thinks the only way to end the zombie plague is by offering himself up to the horde so they can have their revenge and hopefully stop their rampage. He wanders off alone into the woods. Kevin tells the others his story, and Archie wants to go after him but Veronica and Betty convince him otherwise.

Reggie walks into the horde, expecting to be torn limb from limb, but instead they part for him until he reaches the zombified Jughead. The zombified Hot Dog walks forward, and Reggie kneels before it, expecting it to kill him and accepting his fate. But, at that moment a vision of Sabrina Spellman appears before him. She tells him that they will make the zombified Midge whole once again and make her do whatever Reggie wants if Reggie returns to his friend and kills Betty Cooper. Reggie's resolve to redeem himself crumbles upon being offered Midge and he responds with "Kill Betty Cooper... sure, why not?"

== In other media ==
=== Television ===
==== Animation ====
- Reggie appeared in The Archie Show, a 1968 animated series produced by Filmation. He also appeared in the various spin-offs The Archie Comedy Hour, Archie's Funhouse, Archie's TV Funnies, The U.S. of Archie and The New Archie and Sabrina Hour produced in the same format. He was voiced by John Erwin.
- Reggie appeared in The New Archies, a 1987 re-imagining of Archie and the gang. Reggie was portrayed as a pre-teen in junior high. He was voiced by Sunny Besen Thrasher.
- Reggie appeared in Archie's Weird Mysteries voiced by Paul Sosso. He also appeared in The Archies in Jugman as the main antagonist.

==== Live action ====
- Reggie appears in the TV movie Archie: To Riverdale and Back Again portrayed by Gary Kroeger, where he still lives in Riverdale and owns a gym. He acts as the co-antagonist of the film, working with Hiram Lodge to tear down Pop Tate's Chock'lit Shoppe and expand his gym, but at the end, he sees the error of his ways and rekindles his old friendships.
- Reggie appears in Riverdale, a drama series for The CW, portrayed by Charles Melton. The character was originally portrayed by Ross Butler in the first season but left due to scheduling conflicts with 13 Reasons Why. Butler did return as Reggie in the show's 100th episode where he interacted with Melton.
