= The New Archies =

- Genre: Sitcom
- Based on: Archie Comics by: John L. Goldwater; Bob Montana (uncredited); Vic Bloom (uncredited)
- Developed by: Kimmer Ringwald
- Directed by: Jim Simon
- Starring: J. Michael Roncetti; Michael Fantini; Lisa Coristine; Alyson Court; Sunny Besen Thrasher; Victor Erdos; Colin Waterman; Marvin Goldhar; Linda Sorenson; Karen Burthwright; Jazzmin Lausanne; Greg Swanson
- Country of origin: United States
- Original language: English
- No. of seasons: 1
- No. of episodes: 13

Production
- Executive producers: Haim Saban; Andy Heyward
- Producer: Jim Simon
- Running time: 22–24 minutes
- Production companies: DIC Animation City; Riverdale Productions; Saban Productions; Toei Animation (uncredited)

Original release
- Network: NBC
- Release: September 12 – December 5, 1987

The New Archies is an American animated sitcom produced by DIC Animation City, based upon the characters by Archie Comics. The series, originally produced for NBC's Saturday morning schedule and broadcast from September 12 to December 5, 1987, depicted the characters of Archie Andrews, Betty Cooper, Veronica Lodge, Jughead Jones, Reggie Mantle, and other students of Riverdale High School as pre-teens in junior high.

Archie produced an identically named and themed comic book series that ran alongside the animated series.

In the series, Veronica uses the dialect of an archetypal valley girl. In the animated series produced by Filmation and the radio show, she had a southern accent. Dilton Doiley did not appear on The New Archies, and was replaced by an African American child named Eugene. Eugene's girlfriend Amani was also introduced in The New Archies, as was Archie's dog, Red.

The characters of The New Archies

== Cast ==
- J. Michael Roncetti as Archie Andrews
- Lisa Coristine as Betty Cooper
- Alyson Court as Veronica Lodge
- Michael Fantini as Jughead Jones
- Sunny Besen Thrasher as Reggie Mantle
- Marvin Goldhar as Mr. Weatherbee
- Colin Waterman as Eugene
- Greg Swanson as Coach
- Karen Burthwright as Amani
- Victor Erdos as Big Moose
- Jazzmin Lausanne as Big Ethel
- Linda Sorenson as Miss Grundy

== Episodes ==
1. "The Visitor" / "Ballot Box Blues" – September 12, 1987: written by Kimmer Ringwald
2. "The Last Laugh" / "Thief of Hearts" – September 19, 1987: written by Kimmer Ringwald (The Last Laugh), Jon Cohen (Thief of Hearts)
3. "I Gotta Be Me or Is It You?" / "Sir Jughead Jones" – September 26, 1987: written by Jon Cohen (I Gotta Be Me or Is It You?), Kimmer Ringwald (Sir Jughead Jones)
4. "The Awful Truth" / "Jughead Predicts" – October 3, 1987: written by Scott Anderson (The Awful Truth), Eleanor Burian-Mohr and Jack Hanrahan (Jughead Predicts)
5. "Future Shock" / "Stealing the Show" – October 10, 1987: written by Scott Anderson (Future Shock), Herb Engelhardt (Stealing the Show)
6. "Hamburger Helpers" / "Goodby Ms. Grundy" – October 17, 1987: written by Pat Allee and Ben Hurst (Hamburger Helpers), Herb Engelhardt (Goodby Ms. Grundy)
7. "Red to the Rescue" / "Jughead the Jinx" – October 24, 1987: written by Eleanor Burian-Mohr and Jack Hanrahan (Red to the Rescue), Pat Allee and Ben Hurst (Jughead the Jinx)
8. "Telegraph, Telephone, Tell Reggie" / "Wooden It Be Loverly" – October 31, 1987: written by Eleanor Burian-Mohr and Jack Hanrahan
9. "I Was a 12 Year Old Werewolf" / "The Prince of Riverdale" – November 7, 1987: written by Dennis O’Flaherty
10. "Loose Lips Stops Slips" / "A Change of Minds" – November 14, 1987: written by Eleanor Burian-Mohr and Jack Hanrahan (Loose Lips Stops Slips), Gary Greenfield (A Change of Minds)
11. "Incredible Shrinking Archie" / "Gunk for Gold" – November 21, 1987: written by Gary Greenfield (Incredible Shrinking Archie), Eleanor Burian-Mohr and Jack Hanrahan (Gunk for Gold)
12. "Jughead's Millions" / "Making of Mr. Righteous" – November 28, 1987: written by Gary Greenfield (Jughead’s Millions), Pat Allee and Ben Hurst (Making of Mr. Righteous)
13. "Take My Butler, Please" / "Horray for Hollywood" [sic] – December 5, 1987: written by Gary Greenfield (Take My Butler, Please), Pat Allee and Ben Hurst (Horray for Hollywood)
