= Victor Gorelick =

American comic book editor (1941–2020)

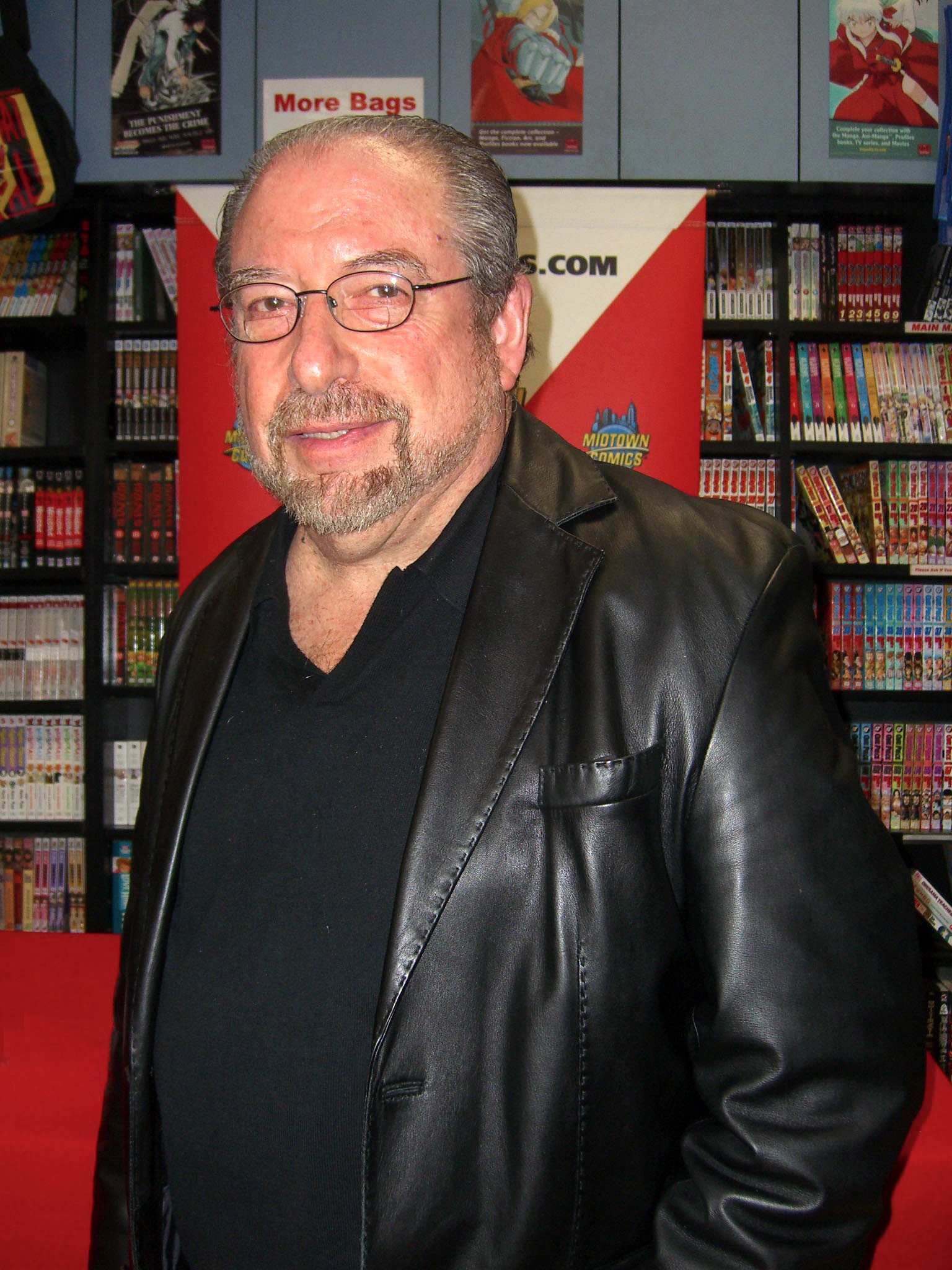
- Gorelick at a December 5, 2012 signing for Archie's Pal Kevin Keller #6 at Midtown Comics Times Square in Manhattan.
- Born: April 5, 1941 Brooklyn, New York
- Died: February 8, 2020 (aged 78)
- Area: Editor
- Notable works: Archie Comics Editor-in-Chief
- Awards: Inkpot Award, 2008
- Spouse: Katherine Theresa Ziegler (m. 1999)

Victor Gorelick (April 5, 1941 – February 8, 2020) was an American comic book editor and executive. Working in a variety of roles for Archie Comics for over 60 years, he rose to the position of editor-in-chief.

== Career ==
After studying at the School of Industrial Art (now known as the High School of Art and Design), Gorelick joined Archie Comics at age 16, when it was being run by its original founders, John Goldwater and Louis Silberkleit. Gorelick began in the publisher's art department, making corrections, and learning how to color and ink. He eventually served as a production coordinator, art director, and editor-in-chief.

Gorelick worked closely with numerous companies designing various custom comic books. For example, he oversaw collaborations between Archie Comics and Kraft General Foods, Radio Shack, and the F.B.I. He served on the Comics Magazine Association of America's Code Authority Guidelines Committee, and as a member of the Board of Advisors of the Joe Kubert School of Cartoon and Graphic Art. He taught cartooning as an instructor at Kingsborough Community College in New York City.

== Awards ==
Archie Comics honored Victor Gorelick in 2008 with a plaque for his 50 years of service to the company.

Gorelick received an Inkpot Award at the 2008 San Diego Comic-Con.
