= Cheryl Blossom =

Fictional character of the Archie Comics universe

Cheryl Marjorie Blossom
- Archie Comics character
- First appearance: Betty and Veronica (1982)
- Created by: Dan DeCarlo
- Portrayed by: Madelaine Petsch (Riverdale); Diya Gupta (The Archies)
- Hometown: Pembrooke (previously); Riverdale (currently)
- School: Pembrooke Academy (previously); Riverdale High School (currently)

In-universe information
- Aliases: Comics; Blaze Blossom; TV series Cheryl Bombshell
- Occupation: Student; Fresh magazine editor Aspiring actress and singer TV series Leader of River Vixens (formerly); Member Southside Serpent (formerly); Resident HBIC; Student body president Head of the Riverdale High LGBTQIA Alliance; Founder of the Pretty Poisons; Archer; Founder of the Maple Club
- Significant others: Comics; Dilton Doiley; Reggie Mantle; Archie Andrews; TV series Toni Topaz; Archie Andrews; Minerva Marble; Heather
- Relatives: Clifford Blossom (father); Penelope Blossom (mother); Jason Blossom (triplet brother); TV series Abigail Blossom † (ancestor); Clifford Blossom † (father); Penelope Blossom (mother); Jason Blossom † (twin brother); Julian Blossom(stillborn triplet brother); Rose Blossom (grandmother); Claudius Blossom † (uncle); Bedford Blossom † (uncle); Dreyfus Starkweather (half uncle); Martin Tucker † (half uncle); Cricket Blossom † (aunt); Fester Blossom † (cousin); Juniper Blossom (nephew); Dagwood Blossom ( nephew); Hal Cooper † (2nd ousin); Betty Cooper (3rd cousin); Polly Cooper † (3rd cousin)

Cheryl Marjorie Blossom is a fictional character of the Archie Comics universe. She is a wealthy and powerful teenage girl, the privileged daughter of a businessman. She is portrayed by Madelaine Petsch in Riverdale and Diya Gupta in The Archies.

== History and character ==
Cheryl Blossom was introduced in 1982 in Betty and Veronica #320 as a third love interest for Archie Andrews, but she and her twin brother Jason disappeared two years later.

In the 1980s, when a number of alternate-universe series were published, Cheryl was a minor recurring character in the short-lived title Archie's Explorers of the Unknown. She appeared as Blaze Blossom and would brief the Explorers on their missions.

The character was reintroduced into the main continuity and Archie Andrews' life during the "Love Showdown" four-part series in 1994. During the series, Archie receives a letter from Cheryl which states she will be returning to Riverdale. Archie, infatuated with girls as always, decides to keep Cheryl's return a secret from Betty Cooper and Veronica Lodge. He merely acts in his typical crush manner, looking dreamy, uttering nonsense. Unknown to Archie is that Betty and Veronica both think the other person did this to Archie, and they declare war on each other to win back Archie once and for all. Super Soakers, dirty dancing, and fraud are just some of the tactics that the girls use on each other. Cheryl returns to Riverdale, leaving readers wondering whom Archie will choose in the end.

Cheryl has appeared in several comic-book stories over the years, including her own series. In one story, it was revealed that an ancestor of Archie once fell in love with an ancestor of Cheryl's back in Scotland. In another story, she decides to join a band titled "The Sugar Girls", (a spoof of the popular band "The Spice Girls") because Ginger Sugar had quit the group. In most stories, Cheryl behaves in a way that reflects her wealth and upbringing. She is very proud of her wealth and occasionally squabbles with Veronica over who leads the more extravagant lifestyle. She can be selfish and manipulative, sometimes plotting to lure Archie away from Betty and Veronica. There are stories in which Cheryl is rude and condescending to the Riverdale "townies," and sometimes only appears as an antagonist to Veronica and Betty. Other times, particularly in the stories in her eponymous series, Cheryl can be kind and caring. She cares for her dog, a Pomeranian named Sugar, and rescues animals in need. In stories featuring Betty, Veronica, and Cheryl, Cheryl is usually the most adventurous. Cheryl is popular within her Pembrooke crowd and popular with the boys in Riverdale, but disliked by the girls for her flirtatious nature, her manipulations and her attractiveness.

Cheryl Blossom was ranked 92nd in Comics Buyer's Guide's "100 Sexiest Women in Comics" list.

== Friends and family ==
Cheryl has a twin brother, Jason, an arrogant rival of Archie. Jason is smitten with Betty Cooper, despite claiming that he only dates rich girls. Cheryl has never complained about his choice of girls. She often shows full support towards her brother, although sometimes, she warns Betty about Jason's womanizing behavior.

At one point, in the story "Undercover Blossom", Cheryl decided that she would try to get into Riverdale High under false pretenses. She chose the alias "Shirley Merriwether"; at first nobody thought anything amiss, until she decided to cause trouble, (i.e., sending fake love letters; and stealing a couple of term papers) and then she'd frame Archie for it, almost turning his friends against him. She had almost succeeded in destroying their friendship forever, but was thwarted when Mr. Weatherbee discovered her fraudulent enrollment papers. At a dance, the following evening, Cheryl's parents, who had been informed of her deceit by Mr. Weatherbee, exposed the entire scam to Cheryl's embarrassment. Her punishment was that she would attend Riverdale High. Her parents thought that since she got in by less than honest means, she would stay there and finish out her school year there. Betty became Cheryl's best friend in the three-part story and loved her dearly. "Friendly Fire" in an issue of Cheryl's title series after Veronica humiliated Cheryl on Betty and Veronica's local public-access television cable TV show, which alienated Betty from Veronica. Veronica, for no other reason than missing Betty's friendship, eventually very publicly apologized to Cheryl, winning back Betty's friendship in the process. Cheryl was shown to still be friends with Betty in a later issue, inviting Betty over to her house. It is unclear how much Archie writers other than Holly Golightly (the writer of "Friendly Fire") portrayed Betty and Cheryl as friends, but a story in Archie & Friends in early 2006 involves Betty suggesting that she, Veronica, and Cheryl go to Pop Tate's Chock'lit Shoppe and hang out. Veronica and Cheryl accept and walk off with Betty, indicating that Betty and Cheryl are still friends.

In the late 1990s, Cheryl began dating Dilton Doiley. They were paired together online, without knowing each other's true identity, fell in love, met in real life, and decided to continue their romantic relationship, though this was largely ignored in later stories.

At one point, Reggie and Cheryl started dating because they both had devilish minds and were very alike. Their relationship was unsuccessful, so Cheryl appeared on a dating show. In a reader-poll event, Archie Comics finally gave Cheryl a new boyfriend, with readers voting on the potential boyfriends featured on the show: blond-haired fitness-guru Austin, dark-complected computer genius Brandon, and shaved-headed gourmet chef George. The winner of the 'contest' was George.

Raj Patel's younger sister Tina Patel, who was introduced to Archie Comics in 2007, has been written into the CW television series Riverdale, which is described as a subversive take on the Archie comics and the characters. Tina Patel is cast as one of Cheryl Blossom's best friends.

== Pembrooke ==
Cheryl and Jason lived in the neighboring, upscale community of Pembrooke during her second stay in the comic books, which lasted until the quiet cancellation of her title series and her subsequent move to Paris. However, Cheryl was soon brought back by popular demand from her fans. Cheryl now lives in Riverdale, and no longer attends Pembrooke, although in some stories she and her brother return to visit friends there. (After her family almost lost all their wealth in one story, the Blossom family decide to make their son and daughter attend Riverdale High for the same reasons that the Lodge family make Veronica attend public school instead of private school).

Pembrooke Academy is the local private school in Pembrooke. The students who attend are frequently portrayed as antagonists to Riverdale High School, often disdaining Riverdale students as "townies." The Blossom twins are the only students who openly date Riverdale "townies," a practice that most Pembrooke students find barely tolerable were it not for the Blossom twins' wealth and popularity.

Pembrooke Academy's athletics were not above using unfair tactics such as sabotage to win a competition. In many stories that feature a rivalry between Riverdale and Pembrooke, Pembrooke often loses despite their attempts to cheat to victory, or the two teams decide to come to a truce.

== Other versions ==
=== Archie's Weird Mysteries ===
Cheryl appears twice in the 2000–2002 Archie's Weird Mysteries comic series, despite not appearing in the TV series of the same name. She reprises her role as one of Archie's love interests alongside Betty and Veronica, although the more sexual aspects of her character are toned down, and Jason does not appear alongside her in this continuity.

=== Afterlife with Archie ===
Cheryl along with her brother Jason appear in the 2013 adult zombie comics series Afterlife with Archie. Jason expresses jealousy with Archie. He later states that he wants to grow old together, alone with Cheryl with no one to bother or judge them. In issue 7, after scouting with her brother, she returns alone, covered in blood, and saying to call her "Blaze".

=== Archie vs. Predator ===
Cheryl and Jason appeared in the first issue of the 2015 crossover series Archie vs. Predator. Cheryl and Jason take a trip to Los Perdidos Resort for a spring break, until they both were killed by an alien creature hunter, known as the Predator.

=== Life with Archie: The Married Life ===
In 2010, Cheryl Blossom made a guest appearance in the first issue of the revival series, Life with Archie: The Married Life. She was seen as a washed-up actress waiting tables in Los Angeles. It was revealed that her parents cut her off financially because they disapproved of her moving there to become an actress. Her brother, Jason, was revealed to be working for Mr. Lodge.

Cheryl returned to Life with Archie in issue 21 (July 2012). In this issue, Cheryl returns to Riverdale; however, unknown to her family and friends back home, she was being treated for breast cancer. Part of this storyline features an underlying issue on the affordability of, and the right to, healthcare.

=== New Riverdale ===
Cheryl Blossom appeared in Archie No. 13, her first appearance in a new Riverdale series. She was introduced as Riverdale's queen bee who is not interested with making friends with the newly transferred Veronica Lodge.

== In other media ==
=== Television ===
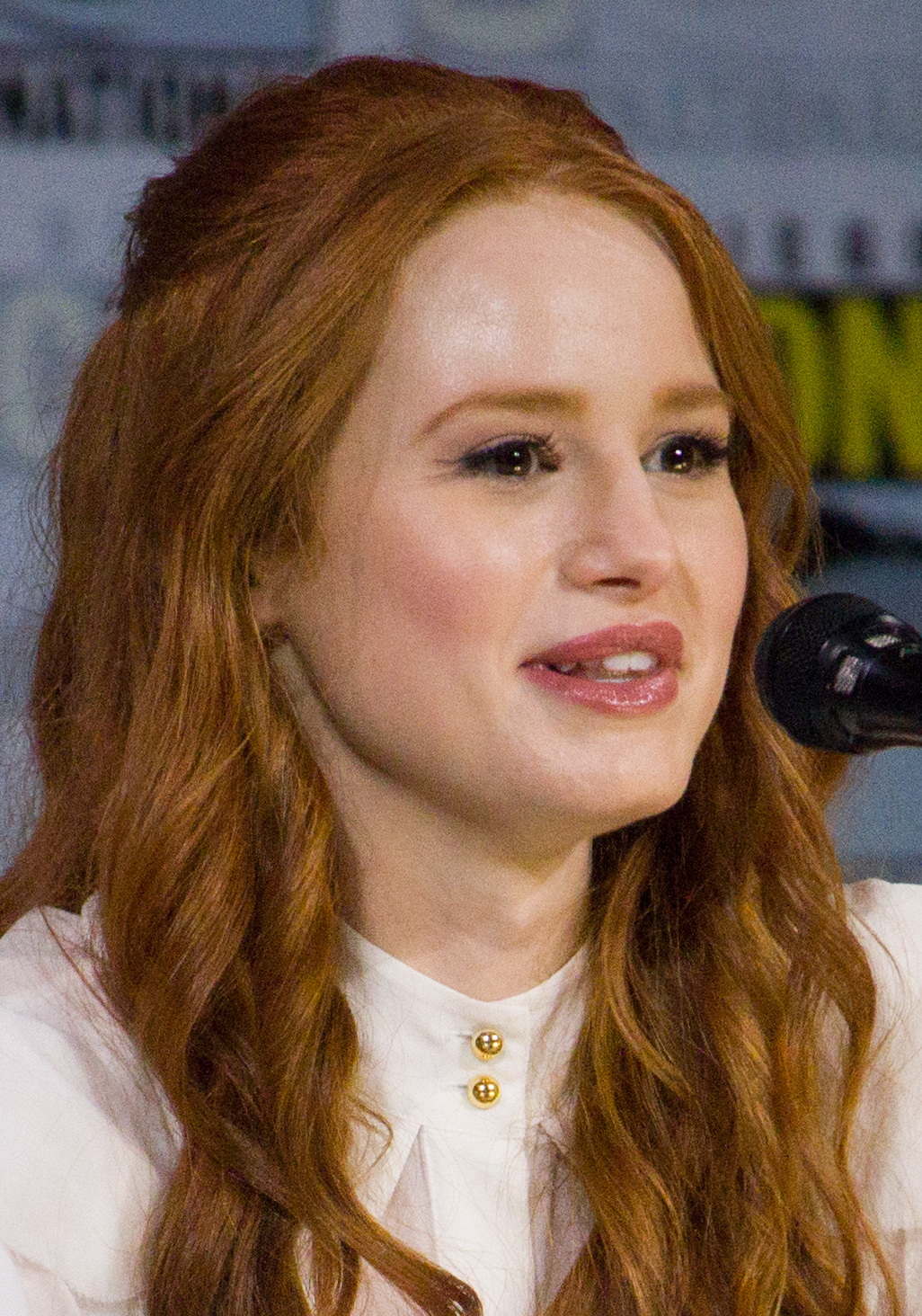
Madelaine Petsch plays Cheryl on Riverdale.

Cheryl Blossom appears in The CW's teen drama series Riverdale as a series regular, played by Madelaine Petsch. She is the first character to appear on "Chapter One: The River's Edge". She is portrayed as the most popular girl at Riverdale High School, a "rich, entitled, and manipulative girl who recently lost her twin brother by being shot in the head by their own father." She is also the daughter of Penelope and Clifford Blossom, who operate Blossom Maple Farms, which produces the town's main export, maple syrup, amongst other things, and niece to Claudius Blossom, Clifford's twin brother. It is revealed that her parents' constant emotional abuse among other traumas is the main cause of her mental instability, which leads to her attempting suicide & attempted murder of her mother in season one. In the second season, her mother forces her into conversion therapy at an institution called "The Sisters of Quiet Mercy", namely due to her attraction towards other girls, mainly Josie McCoy. After escaping, Cheryl begins a relationship with Toni Topaz, thus joining the Southside Serpents gang in the season finale. Cheryl and Toni then proceed to move in together at Thistlehouse, the Blossom residence. In season three, her relationship with Toni progresses further, and she is confirmed as a lesbian. After being kicked out of the Serpents by Jughead, Cheryl thanks Toni for being the best girlfriend ever with a new gang, called the Pretty Poisons. After Cheryl breaks up with Toni, she stars in the high school musical production as Heather Chandler in "Heathers". Cheryl and Toni later get back together, but no sooner than that does she join The Farm, which is really an organ harvesting cult. Soon after her joining, Betty warns her about it. Cheryl saves Toni, but is still trapped there. While trying to break free she finds her dead brother Jason's body at the farm. Alice Cooper helps Cheryl escape and meet up with Toni. Meanwhile, Veronica, Archie, and Betty are all being tortured and nearly killed by Penelope Blossom, Cheryl's mother. Cheryl and Toni round up the Pretty Poisons and Serpents to save their friends. In the fourth season, Toni and Cheryl continue their relationship. Veronica and Cheryl start their own rum business called Maple Rum, run in an old brothel club that Penelope Blossom used to run. After visiting Ms. Burble, the guidance counselor, and expressing all of her feelings including that she has her dead brother's body in her basement and is being haunted by a doll, she is replaced by a coach on the cheerleading squad.

=== Film ===
- Cheryl made a film adaptation appearance in The Archies on Netflix, portrayed by Diya Gupta.
