= Kevin Keller (character) =

Publication information
- Publisher: Archie Comics
- First appearance: Veronica #202 (September 2010)
- Created by: Dan Parent
Kevin Keller
- Cover to Kevin Keller (vol. 2) #1 (February 2012)
Publication information
- Publisher: Archie Comics
- Schedule: Monthly
- Format: (vol. 1); Limited series (vol. 2); Ongoing series
- Publication date: June 2011 – November 2014
- No. of issues: (vol 1); 4 (vol 2); 15
Creative team
- Written by: Dan Parent
- Artist: Dan Parent
- Letterer: Jack Morelli
- Colorist: Glen Whitmore

Kevin Keller is a fictional character in the Archie Comics universe. He debuted in Veronica #202, published in September 2010. Created by writer/artist Dan Parent, Kevin is the first gay character in Archie Comics history. He is portrayed by Casey Cott on Riverdale.

== Character description and publication history ==
In Keller's initial storyline, "Isn't It Bromantic?", Veronica expresses interest in dating Kevin but he is uninterested. As he and Jughead bond over their mutual love of food, Kevin explains that he does not want to date Veronica because he is gay. Kevin also bonds with Veronica and they become best friends.

Archie Comics co-CEO John L. Goldwater explained that including an openly gay character is a way to open up the world of Riverdale and de-stigmatize homosexuality. "Archie's hometown of Riverdale has always been a safe world for everyone. It just makes sense to have an openly gay character in Archie comic books." Veronica writer Dan Parent concurred, saying "It shows that Riverdale is in the 21st century."

Keller returned in Veronica #205 and headlined his own four-issue miniseries, Kevin Keller, beginning in June 2011. The new series focused on Keller's life before he arrived in Riverdale, including his struggles in junior high school. It also establishes that he is an Army brat and introduces the characters Wendy and William, friends whom Keller had been previously seen texting.

In July 2011, Archie Comics announced that Keller would star in his own ongoing solo title, also titled Kevin Keller. The new series debuted in February 2012 and featured Keller becoming class president while also dealing with "adversity". The series ended in November 2014 after 15 issues.

In April 2015, Archie Comics announced that Kevin Keller would headline another solo series, Life with Kevin. It would be a digital-first mini-series to start with the option to become an ongoing series if successful. The series will bring back creator Dan Parent as writer/artist as well as J. Bone as inker. The series will not take place in Archie Comics' "New Riverdale", instead being set in the classic Archie universe and focusing on an older Kevin who has moved to New York City after graduating from college. The series debuted in June 2016.

== Other versions ==
=== Afterlife with Archie ===
Kevin appears in the second issue of Afterlife with Archie. He is shown to be a skilled archer as well as having received military training from his father who died before the series began.

=== Life with Archie: The Married Life ===
Keller first appeared as an adult in issue #16 (January 2012) of Life with Archie: The Married Life where his marriage to Clay Walker was shown. Later, after Walker is shot in a robbery attempt, Keller runs for and wins election to the United States Senate on a platform of stricter gun control legislation; the series concludes with Archie Andrews' death saving the newly elected Senator Keller from an assassination attempt.

== In other media ==
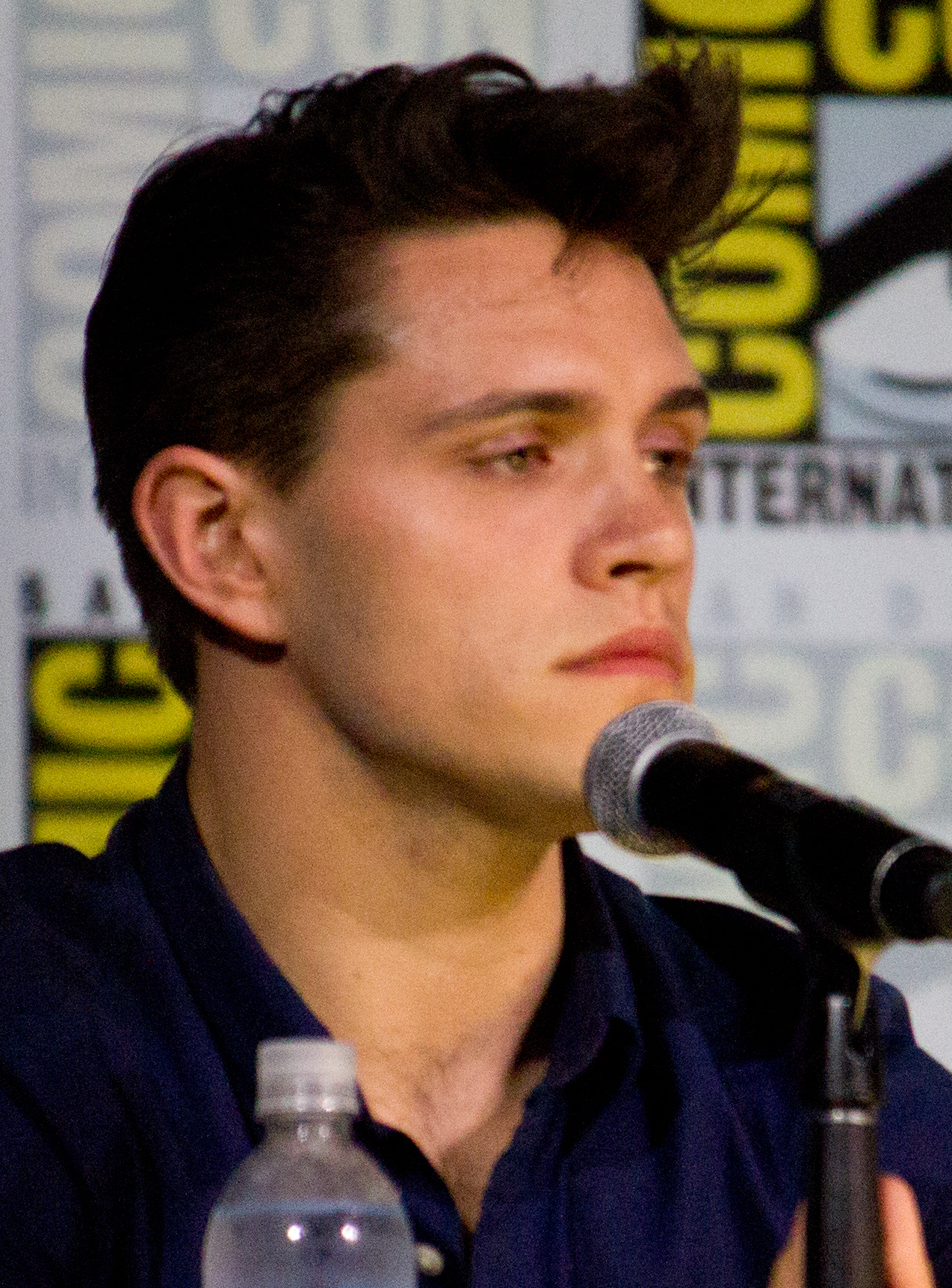
Casey Cott plays Kevin on Riverdale.

- Kevin appears in Riverdale, a drama series for The CW portrayed by Casey Cott. His character featured in a recurring role for the first season; he was then promoted to regular cast for the next season.
- Cott reprises the role in the episode "Chapter Ten: Gloria" from the first season of Katy Keene, a spin-off of Riverdale.

== Reception ==
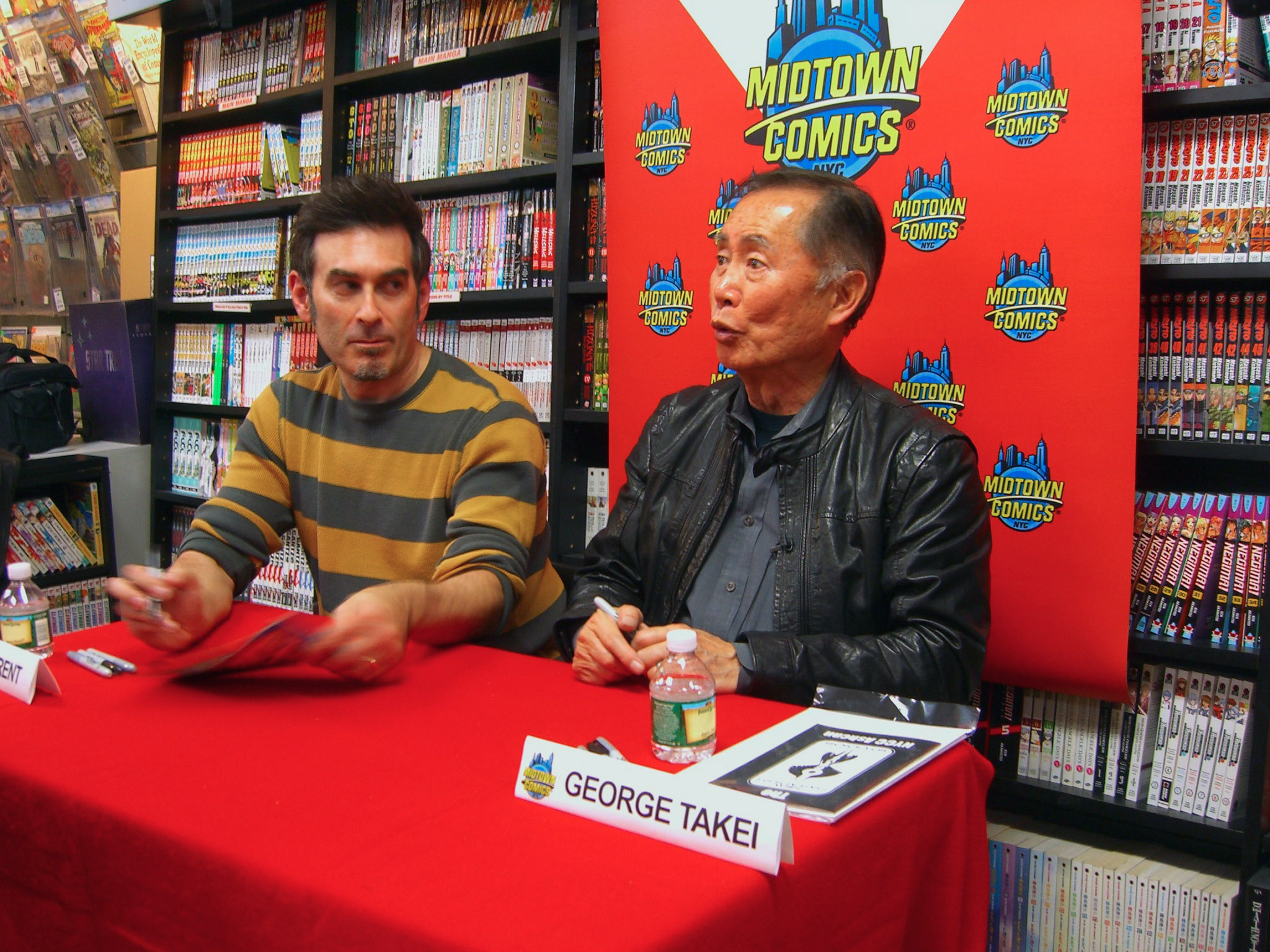
Kevin Keller's creator Dan Parent and actor George Takei, who guest-starred in Archie's Pal Kevin Keller #6.

Kevin Keller's first appearance in Veronica #202 proved so popular that the issue sold out, prompting Archie Comics to issue a reprint for the first time in its history.

Gay & Lesbian Alliance Against Defamation then-president Jarrett Barrios praised Kevin's creation. "It's thrilling to see Riverdale High welcome its first openly gay student, and give readers a window into the lives of gay youth today. As images of gay and transgender people become more frequent on TV and in film, people are embracing and expect to see images of our community across media platforms, including comic books." Parent was nominated for a GLAAD Media Award in 2011 for creating Kevin.

Parent has reported that fan reaction to Keller has been overwhelmingly favorable. "Not everybody's particularly happy about it, but from where I'm sitting it's been about 98% positive." He has noted the number of gay fans who have approached him at personal appearances to express their appreciation and explain what a difference a character like Keller would have made to them as they were growing up.

== Collected editions ==
The series has so far been assembled into the following collections:

=== Trade paperbacks ===
Title	ISBN	Release date	Collected material	Issues published
Kevin Keller	978-1879794931	February 28, 2012	Kevin Keller Vol. 1 #1–4	June 2011 – December 2011
Kevin Keller: Welcome to Riverdale	978-1936975235	November 20, 2012	Kevin Keller Vol. 2 #1–4	February 2012 – August 2012
Kevin Keller: Drive Me Crazy	978-1936975587	August 27, 2013	Kevin Keller Vol. 2 #5–8	October 2012 – May 2013
Kevin Keller: Glad To Be Me	978-1936975907	November 25, 2014	Kevin Keller vol. 2 #9-12	June 2013 – December 2013
Kevin Keller: Top of the World	978-1619889705	February 10, 2015	Kevin Keller vol. 2 #13-15	May 2014 – September 2014
Life with Kevin	978-1682559406	January 16, 2018	Life with Kevin vol. 1 #1-5	June 2016 – January 2018
Kevin Keller: Celebration! Omnibus	978-1645768876	August 9, 2022	Kevin Keller vol. 1 #1-4, Kevin Keller vol. 2 #1-15, Life with Kevin Vol. 1 #1-5	
