= Dilton Doiley =

Fictional character in Archie Comics

- Archie Comics character
- First appearance: Archie Annual #1 as “Dilbert Doiley” 1949
- Created by: Bob Montana
- Voiced by: Howard Morris (1968–1977); Ben Beck (1999–2002)
- Portrayed by: Daniel Yang (Riverdale pilot, season 7); Major Curda (Riverdale seasons 1, 2, 3, 6); Yuvraj Menda (The Archies)
- Hometown: Riverdale
- School: Riverdale High School

In-universe information
- Significant others: Betty Cooper; Cheryl Blossom
- Relatives: Mr. and Mrs. Doiley (parents)

Dilton Donald Doiley, originally Dilbert Doiley, is a fictional character in the Archie Comics universe, where he is considered as the smartest teenager in Riverdale High School.

== History ==
Characters resembling Dilton (in appearance and personality) appeared early in Archie stories. One can be seen, unnamed, in Archie Comics #1 (Winter 1942). The Pep Comics #27 (May 1942) featured a Dilton prototype named Theodosius and a character named Dilbert in Archie Comics #34 (September–October 1948). On February 16, 1948, Dilton Doiley officially made his first appearance in the Archie newspaper comic strip, yet his surname was spelled without today's "e". The name Dilton was first used in Pep Comics #78 (Mar 1950).

== Character background ==
Dilton is depicted as a stereotypical nerdy teenager; he is highly educated, interested in academic subjects, especially science, speaks in detailed and superfluous language, wears glasses, and is shorter than his friends. It is also stated that he has an IQ of 198 when Archie and the gang all take part in a class IQ test. While he is not particularly interested in dating, he is widely admired by Archie and the gang. Dilton uses his garage as a science laboratory. He is a skilled amateur inventor, although many of his creations do not work out as planned. His intelligence has also won him numerous science awards. His teachers, particularly Professor Flutesnoot, are very proud of his achievements.

Though Dilton often spends much of his time in his lab, he has a secret ambition to be a Riverdale High athlete. Coach Kleats rarely has confidence in him, so Dilton more commonly shows his school spirit by wearing the team mascot costume. However, he has been shown to be able to use his mathematical ability to pitch baseballs like a professional. Even when he is relegated to being Riverdale High's baseball team scorekeeper, he is still a valuable asset, even though he once disappointed a girl interested in him who thought he was a regular player. This happened when he noticed that a team winning against Riverdale had committed a batting out of turn error and then told Coach Kleats. They then informed the umpire as required in the rules for a judgment, and the umpire declared the offending player was out, which allowed Riverdale to win with the opportunity Dilton made possible.

Writer Alex de Campi was excited to include the character when she wrote the 2015 limited series Archie vs. Predator, because she felt he was often overlooked in the regular Archie books.

== Family and friends ==
Dilton's parents appear occasionally, but almost never play a significant role. Both are typically depicted as dark-haired and bespectacled like their son. His mother who is both proud of and perplexed at her son's inventiveness, appears more often than his father. Like the teenage characters, many of Dilton's relatives were simply created for one particular story and were never seen again.

In one story in the 1970s, it was revealed that Mr. Doiley is actually Dilton's stepfather. None of Dilton's friends know this except for Chuck Clayton. Dilton, not feeling that he could deal with the shock after it being kept a secret all this time, almost ran away from home. However, after confiding in Chuck about his problem, Chuck made Dilton realize that Mr. Doiley cares about Dilton like a real father and that he would be heartbroken if Dilton ran away from home.

Moose Mason is Dilton's closest friend. Despite their completely different personalities, their closeness stems from a mutual understanding of how well they complement each other. Moose considers Dilton his "little buddy" and will do anything to protect him. In current stories, this relationship is increasingly being portrayed as symbiotic, with Dilton standing up in favor of Moose—in one story, he even pounces on Reggie Mantle in defense of Moose, when the latter was insulting Moose.

Dilton's other close friends include Archie Andrews, Betty Cooper, and Jughead Jones. He has helped the gang many times with his various inventions or with his vast knowledge when they are faced with a problem. He is also willing to help his friends if they have difficulty in school. These are just some of the ways that Dilton manages to fit in with the gang.

== Series ==
From May 1989 to May 1990, Dilton was the focus of his own magazine titled "Dilton's Strange Science". The magazine showcased Dilton and his friend Danni Malloy, an amateur inventor with red hair, who shared his interests and intellect. In the publication, they shared various science fiction stories that featured their own inventions.

Dilton features in a recurring one-page gag in the comics called "Open the Door, Dilton". There are three gags on a page, each covering two panels. On the first panel, Dilton approaches a door with a label saying what is inside. However, the words have a double entendre. On the second panel, looking into the room, he finds that the words do not refer to their usual meaning, which is what he was really looking for. For example:

Behind a door marked "Hand Bags", someone is selling bags shaped like hands.
Behind a door marked "General Trucking", army generals are dancing.
Behind a door marked "Flea Collar", someone is putting tiny collars on fleas' necks.

Dilton also appears in other spin-offs with the rest of the gang, serving as the "brains" of the group as he does in the main series. He was a member of Archie's racing team in "Archie R/C Racers", and featured in "Explorers of the Unknown" as team inventor Gizmo. He rarely appears in "Archie I" or "Archie 3000", but in the former, he makes prehistoric discoveries, while in the latter, he makes use of the highly advanced technology.

== In other media ==
=== Television ===
==== Animated ====
- Dilton appeared in The Archie Show, a 1968 cartoon series produced by Filmation voiced by Howard Morris.
- Dilton was promoted to one of the main characters in Archie's Weird Mysteries, voiced by Ben Beck. Appearing in a majority of the episodes, his scientific knowledge and inventions are often used to solve the titular mysteries, although sometimes they might be the cause of such problems. Unlike most incarnations, this version spends most of his time working in the school lab, as opposed to his own garage.

==== Live-action ====
- Dilton was planned to appear in the 1990 TV film Archie: To Riverdale and Back Again, but his parts were written out due to a combination of time constraints and his actor getting sick during production.
- Dilton appears in Riverdale, a drama series for The CW portrayed by Daniel Yang in the pilot and by Major Curda onwards. Daniel Yang reprised the role in Season 7.

=== Film ===
- Dilton appears in The Archies, a musical film adaptation in Hindi, portrayed by Yuvraj Menda. In this rendition, Dilton Doiley harbors a secret attraction to Reggie Mantle; in a scene later in the film, Reggie tells him that he knows about Dilton's feelings, and even though Reggie does not share them, Reggie admires Dilton and will always be his friend. Dilton's intellectual hobbies end up helping save the day when he unveils that he has built a radio transmitter.
