= Bob Montana =

American cartoonist (1920–1975)

- Born: Robert William Montana; October 23, 1920 Stockton, California, U.S.
- Died: January 4, 1975 (aged 54) Meredith, New Hampshire, U.S.
- Areas: Cartoonist, Artist
- Notable works: Archie Andrews
- Spouse: Peggy (née Wherett)

Robert William Montana (October 23, 1920 – January 4, 1975) was an American comic strip artist who created the original likenesses for characters published by Archie Comics and in the newspaper strip Archie.

== Early life ==
He was born in Stockton, California, to Roberta Pandolfini Coleman and Ray Coleman. Both were in show business: Roberta had been a Ziegfeld girl and travelled with a Gilbert and Sullivan operetta troupe, while Ray performed banjo on the vaudeville circuit. "Montana" was Ray's stage name, and the family adopted the name legally in 1927. As a result of the family's work on the touring circuit, Bob Montana traveled extensively as a child, and he performed along with his sister Ruth in their father's vaudeville act. He attended Haverhill High School in Haverhill, Massachusetts. and graduated from Manchester High School Central in Manchester, New Hampshire. He studied water colors and book illustration at Boston's Museum of Fine Arts, and took courses in portrait art and illustration at the Phoenix Art Institute in New York.

== Career ==
A cartoonist from childhood, Montana first displayed his caricatures at the age of 15, on the walls of a nightclub called The Ranchero opened up by his father in Boston after the audience for vaudeville declined.

Montana worked in advertising and pulp magazine illustration before entering the comic book field. While freelancing at True Comics and Fox Comics, he created an adventure strip about four teenage boys and tried to sell it without success. He also worked as an assistant to cartoonist Rube Goldberg.

=== Archie Comics ===
When Montana started working for MLJ Comics (Note: John Goldwater was to later ask Montana if they could rename MLJ Comics to Archie Comics.) he was asked to work up a high-school style comic-strip story, featuring Archie Andrews.

Bob Montana presented his four-boy strip to John Goldwater while working as a freelance artist at MLJ. Goldwater thought it would be more appealing to feature two boys and two girls than four boys. Goldwater liked the name Archibald (after a friend) but Montana liked Chick. (Note: 'Chick' was to later be resuscitated in the name of Betty Cooper's older brother Chick (or 'Chic') Cooper.) They settled on Archie. Montana and Harry Lucey collaborated on the first comic book story which was featured in Pep Comics (Dec. 1941), and its popularity led MLJ to assign Montana to draw the first issue of Archie (Nov. 1942). After serving in WW2, in 1946, Montana was soon drawing the Archie comic newspaper strip, doing both the daily and Sunday strip, which over the next 35 years ran in over 750 newspapers worldwide.

According to Jane (Donahue) Murphy, a high school classmate of Montana's, Archie and his friends were based on people from their hometown and high school. She said Archie Andrews was based on Donahue's cousin, Richard Heffernan; Veronica Lodge on Agatha Popoff, the daughter of the local football team's doctor; Jughead Jones on a mischievous teen named "Skinny" Linnehan; while Miss Grundy may have been based on a high school typing and shorthand teacher named Lundstrom; however, Haverhill's school librarian is also believed to be the model for Grundy. Others, who worked with him, saw his illustrations of Archie to be self-portraits. Peggy described Veronica as a composite of all the blue-blood girls Montana had met while living in Boston and others have pointed out her resemblance to movie star Veronica Lake. Pop Tate's Chock'lit Shop was modeled after a Chocolate Shop where Montana used to hang out in high school. Montana claimed that Jughead was created on the drawing board, saying "I never knew him."

== Personal life ==
Montana served 3½ years in WW2 in the US Army Signal Corps, putting his artistic talent to use creating encoded maps and working on training films, and was a sergeant at war's end. During this time, he met and in 1946 married Helen Frances "Peggy" Wherrett, who had been working as a secretary at the army base where he was stationed. They had four children: Paige, Lynn, Ray and Don.

He died at age 54 of an apparent heart attack while cross-country skiing near his New Hampshire home.
