= Riverdale (Archie Comics) =

Fictional town

- Archie Comics location
- First appearance: Archie Comics
- Based on: Riverdale
- Genre: Comics

In-universe information
- Type: City
- Character: Archie Andrews

Riverdale is a fictional town in the United States where most of the characters live and appear in Archie Comics. Conflicting details on its geographic location have been given over the years. It is located near the fictional town of Greendale, home of Sabrina the Teenage Witch comic book series. In the television series Riverdale, it is located near Greendale related to the television series Chilling Adventures of Sabrina.

== Overview ==
Riverdale is the setting of the stories in the Archie Comics universe. It is usually depicted as a medium-sized town (possibly a suburb of a bigger city), with all the usual amenities of shopping malls, restaurants, and parks. In the first Archie stories in the 1940s, it was identified as Riverdale, New York, a real neighborhood in The Bronx. In Jackpot Comics #5 (Spring 1942), a story written by Bob Montana has the gang going on a river trip. One panel says "...the good ship 'Peter Stuyvesant' settles into the Hudson, as Riverdale High clambers aboard for a happy trip to Bear Mountain." Riverdale has been shown to have beaches, lakes, rivers, deserts, farmland, woodland, mountains, plains, a transit system, and four distinct seasons with changes in climate.

Archie Comics publisher John L. Goldwater and initial Archie artist Bob Montana differed on the inspiration for Riverdale, with Goldwater saying it was based on his hometown of Hiawatha, Kansas, and Montana saying the town's high school was based on his own in Haverhill, Massachusetts, where as in the comics a replica of Auguste Rodin's famous statue The Thinker stands.

In one issue of Archie and Jughead Digest, when one of the readers asked in a letter, "Where is Riverdale located?", the editor replied, "Riverdale is more of a state of mind than an actual physical location. It could be anywhere that kind people live and just have fun, like Archie and his friends. It could be in the Midwest, or along the Eastern Seaboard, or even a town in Canada, Mexico, or England."

== Riverdale High School ==
Riverdale High School is the local educational institution of Riverdale where Archie and his friends attend the 11th grade. Its school colors are blue and gold, and its school newspaper is the Blue and Gold.

Only a few of Riverdale High's staff appear regularly in the comics; these include the school principal Mr. Weatherbee, homeroom teacher Miss Grundy, chemistry teacher Mr. Flutesnoot, history teacher Miss Haggly, physical education teachers Coach Kleats and Coach Clayton, cafeteria cook Miss Beazley, custodian Mr. Svenson, secretary Miss Phlips, and superintendent of schools Mr. Hassle.

In the TV show, the staff frequently shown/mentioned in Riverdale are Mr. Weatherbee (principal), Miss Grundy (former, deceased music teacher), Coach Clayton (football coach) and Mr. Svenson (caretaker)

In the five-issue miniseries Faculty Funnies (cover-dated June 1989 – May 1990) by writer George Gladir and penciler Stan Goldberg, faculty members Mr. Weatherbee, Mr. Flutesnoot, Miss Grundy and Coach Clayton secretly become the superhero team the Awesome Foursome after a lab accident involving Archie's science project. They lose their powers after putting out a chemical fire.

The series Archie at Riverdale High ran 113 issues (August 1972 – February 1987). This was followed by Riverdale High, which ran six issues (August–June 1990). After a brief hiatus, it was retitled Archie's Riverdale High and then canceled with issue #8 (August–October 1991).

== Places ==
Places in Riverdale besides the high school include the following:

- Pop Tate's Chocklit Shoppe, the soda shop frequented by the teenaged cast.
- Pickens Park, the community park named for the fictional Civil War hero General Pickens.
- The Lodge Mansion, the large and luxurious home of wealthy Veronica Lodge and her parents.
- Homes of other members of the gang, including the Andrews residence, Jones residence and Cooper residence.
- Dilton Doiley's science lab, a home-based setup where Dilton invents and conducts experiments.
- Chuck Clayton's studio, where Chuck draws his cartoons at home.
- The beach, where Archie and the gang spend much of their time in the summer.
- The Riverdale Mall, a source of shopping and entertainment, particularly for the girls.
- The Blossom Mansion, the larger and luxurious home where wealthy Cheryl Blossom and her family live.
- Riverdale High, where all the teens go to school, and where all the dances and some parties are hosted, like homecoming.
- Bunker, Adventure and meeting place for all characters as well as connections with Rivervale

== Nearby towns ==
Some nearby towns include Greendale and Midvale. Greendale is the home of Sabrina, the Teenage Witch, who once lived in Riverdale but eventually moved. Characters who appear in Josie and the Pussycats come from Midvale.

Riverdale High School's main scholastic and athletic rival is Central High School, located in another nearby community. Central High seems to consist of nothing but villainous types. The males are generally thuggish, conniving brutes, and the females are usually lecherous, scheming vamps. In most of their encounters, Central students seldom compete without using unsportsmanlike conduct, if not out-and-out cheating. The coaches and teachers often are not only aware of this skullduggery, but encourage it. In most cases, Central's team colors are bright red and silver-white.

In the fourth season of the show, Stonewall Prep is heavily mentioned as one of the nearby rival schools. Student often dress in rabbit memorabilia and carry fake looking axes to intimidate unwanted newcomers.

Pembrooke Academy is a private school attended by siblings Cheryl and Jason Blossom and their snobbish friends Bunny and Cedric. They look down on Riverdale students as "townies" and will not (except for the Blossom twins) willingly associate with them. Other schools that have been featured as Riverdale rival schools include Hadley High and Southside High. In one comic, a letter sent to Riverdale has "U." where the state should be, and a ZIP code of 10543 (which in real life is Mamaroneck, New York, the home of Michael Silberkleit, an Archie Comics editor).

== Related media ==
- In the pilot of the 2017 series Riverdale, the town is described as being located in "Rockland County." Only one county in the US has that name, Rockland County, New York, close to Archie Comics' headquarters in Pelham, New York. Whereas the real Rockland County has a heavily suburban character and is only about 40 miles from New York City, the TV version of Riverdale is much more isolated, is not home to anyone who regularly commutes to New York City for work, and features several plot points that depend on the town being located close to the Canadian border. This suggests that the fictional Rockland County on the show is not the same as its real-life counterpart and is instead in far Upstate New York.

== Cultural references ==
- In The Simpsons episode "Sideshow Bob Roberts" (Episode 2F02), several Archie Comics characters, including Archie Andrews, Reggie Mantle, Moose Mason and Jughead Jones have a cameo. The episode also features a copy of Archie Comics.
- In "Marge the Lumberjill" (Episode ZABF02) from the same series, Springfield Elementary students perform dramatic scenes that they write themselves, based on TV shows and YouTube, including one from Riverdale.

== See also ==
- New Riverdale
- Duckburg
- Springfield
