= New Riverdale =

Comic book umbrella title

Publication information
- Publisher: Archie Comics
- Genre: Humor/comedy
- Publication date: July 8 2015 – December 13 2023
- Main character(s): Archie Andrews; Jughead Jones; Sabrina Spellman; Josie and the Pussycats

Creative team
- Written by: Various
- Artist: Various

Collected editions
- Road to Riverdale Vol. 1: ISBN 978-1682559727
- Road to Riverdale Vol. 3: ISBN 978-1682559628
- Road to Riverdale Vol. 3: ISBN 978-1682559642

New Riverdale was the 2015 revamp and relaunch by Archie Comics of its core line of ongoing monthly comic books. Among the renumbered series was Archie, which had retained its original numbering since its launch in 1942. The relaunch included various changes to the Archie fictional universe to entice new readers, including a new character design aesthetic and a more mature, serialized story format and scripting, aimed at older, contemporary teenage and young adult readers.

The New Riverdale branding ended after the conclusion of Archie in July 2018, although its continuity continued with its successor, Archie Forever. In October 2018, Archie was relaunched again with a new creative team. The title also reverted to its overall issue number with #699, a 32-page one-shot meant to catch new readers up on the previous Archie run. Starting with Archie #700 in November 2018, all new titles carried the Archie Forever branding. The New Riverdale continuity came to an close with three one-shots, the last of which, Sabrina the Teenage Witch Holiday Special #1, was released in December 2023.

== Publication history ==
In December 2014, Archie Comics announced that its flagship series Archie would relaunch with a new first issue in July 2015. The new series would be a modern take on the Archie characters by writer Mark Waid and artist Fiona Staples, featuring serialized storylines. The first issue came in at #7 for comic book sales for the month. After the first three issues, Annie Wu drew an issue, followed by new regular artist Veronica Fish. The new title received IGN's "Best New Comic Series of 2015" award.

The next title, Jughead, was released in October. Early issues of Archie and Jughead included reprints of early original stories featuring the characters, introduced by the series' contemporary writer. Later issues had material relating to the Riverdale TV show instead.

In April 2015, Archie Comics announced Betty and Veronica which debuted in July 2016. Josie and the Pussycats, and Reggie and Me, a five-issue miniseries, followed in September and December 2016. Each issue typically has several variant covers.

In December 2016, Sabrina the Teenage Witch was one of four one-shots announced for March 2017 as part of Archie Comics' "pilot season". This one-shot, written by Katie Cook and Francho, with art by Andy Price, would have been greenlit into a full series if there was enough fan interest. However, in May 2017 it was revealed that the one-shot was cancelled, with no intention of releasing it at a later date. Sabrina the Teenage Witch eventually joined the New Riverdale continuity during the Archie Forever years, written by Kelly Thompson and illustrated by Veronica Fish and Andy Fish.

In 2016, Archie Comics made a special edition of the first issue of the New Riverdale Archie series available as part of Free Comic Book Day. For FCBD 2017, a special edition of the first issue of Betty and Veronica was released.

In October 2019, Archie Comics announced Josie and the Pussycats in Space. The five-issue miniseries under the Archie Forever branding was published as a ComiXology original series. In September 2020, the first original graphic novel for the New Riverdale universe was released. Written by Vixens' Jamie L. Rotante, with art by Brittney Williams, Betty and Veronica: The Bond of Friendship is a young adult graphic that sees the titular BFFs examining their futures during Riverdale High's career day.

In February 2026, Oni Press announced that select stories from the "New Riverdale" era would be re-released as part of its Compact Edition line. The first wave, collecting the first story arcs of Archie, Sabrina the Teenage Witch, and Jughead, was timed to coincide with the launch of Oni Press' debut line of ongoing series based on the Archie characters.

== List of publications ==
=== Ongoing series ===
Title	Issue	Writer	Artist(s)	Colorist	Debut date	Conclusion date
New Riverdale
Archie Vol. 2	#1–32	Mark Waid; Ian Flynn	Fiona Staples; Annie Wu; Veronica Fish; Thomas Pitilli and Ryan Jampole; Joe Eisma; Pete Woods; Audrey Mok	Andre Syzmanowicz; Jen Vaughn; Kelly Fitzpatrick	July 8, 2015	July 11, 2018
Jughead Vol. 3	#1–16	Chip Zdarksy; Ryan North; Mark Waid and Ian Flynn	Erica Henderson; Derek Charm	Erica Henderson; Andre Syzmanowicz; Eric Lee; Barry Grossman; Derek Charm; Matt Herms	October 7, 2015	June 28, 2017
Josie and the Pussycats Vol. 2	#1–9	Marguerite Bennett; Cemeron DeOrdio	Audrey Mok; Kelsey Shannon	Andre Syzmanowicz; Kelly Fitzpatrick; Matt Herms	September 28, 2016	August 23, 2017
The Archies	#1–7	Matthew Rosenberg; Alex Segura	Joe Eisma	Matt Herms	October 4, 2017	May 16, 2018
Betty & Veronica: Vixens	#1–10	Jamie Lee Rotante	Eva Cabrera; Jen Vaughn; Sanya Anwar	Elaina Unger; Rachel Deering; Matt Herms	November 22, 2017	September 26, 2018
Archie Forever
Archie Vol. 1 cont.	#699–713	Ian Flynn; Nick Spencer; Mariko Tamaki; Kevin Panetta	Marguerite Sauvage; Sandy Jarrell; Jenn St. Onge; Laura Braga	Kelly Fitzpatrick; Matt Herms	October 3, 2018	July 29, 2020

=== Limited Series ===
Title	Issue	Writer	Artist(s)	Colorist	Debut date	Conclusion date
New Riverdale
Betty & Veronica Vol. 3	#1–3	Adam Hughes		José Villarrubia	July 20, 2016	June 14, 2017
Reggie and Me Vol. 2	#1–5	Tom DeFalco	Sandy Jarrell	Kelly Fitzpatrick	December 7, 2016	May 3, 2017
Archie Forever
Betty & Veronica Vol. 4	#1–5	Jamie Lee Rotante	Sandra Lanz	Kelly Fitzpatrick	December 19, 2018	May 8, 2019
Sabrina the Teenage Witch Vol. 4	#1–5	Kelly Thompson	Andy Fish and Veronica Fish		March 27, 2019	September 11, 2019
Jughead's Time Police Vol. 2	#1–5	Sina Grace	Derek Charm	Matt Herms	June 12, 2019	October 30, 2019
Josie and the Pussycats in Space	#1–5	Alex de Campi	Devaki Neogi	Lee Loughridge	October 23, 2019	February 26, 2020
Sabrina the Teenage Witch: Something Wicked	#1–5	Kelly Thompson	Andy Fish and Veronica Fish		June 3, 2020	February 17, 2021

=== One-shots ===
Title	Writer	Artist	Colorist	Debut date
New Riverdale
Big Moose	Sean Ryan	Cory Smith	Matt Herms	April 26, 2017
The Archies	Matthew Rosenberg; Alex Segura	Joe Eisma	Matt Herms	May 24, 2017
Archie Forever
Archie's Holiday Magic Special	Micol Ostow; Michael Northrop; Joseph Torres	Dan Schoening; Arielle Jovellanos; Gretel Lusky	Matt Herms	December 8, 2021
Archie Love & Heartbreak Special	Thomas Pitilli		Matt Herms	February 9, 2022
Sabrina the Teenage Witch Holiday Special	Danielle Paige; Kelly Thompson	Veronica Fish; Veronica Johnson	Matt Herms	December 13, 2023

=== Original graphic novel ===
Title	Writer	Artist	Colorist	Debut date	ISBN
Archie Forever
Betty and Veronica: The Bond of Friendship	Jamie Lee Rotante	Brittney L. Williams	Matt Herms	September 2, 2020	978-1645769859

== Collected editions ==
=== Trade paperbacks ===
#	Title	Material collected	Format	Pages	Released	ISBN
Archie
1	Archie, Volume One	Archie #1–6, Jughead #1	TPB	176	March 29, 2016	978-1-62738-867-2
2	Archie, Volume Two	Archie #7–12, Betty & Veronica #1	TPB	176	November 30, 2016	978-1-62738-798-9
3	Archie, Volume Three	Archie #13–17	TPB	144	May 9, 2017	978-1-68255-993-2
4	Archie, Volume Volume Four: Over the Edge	Archie #18–22	TPB	144	September 19, 2017	978-1-68255-970-3
5	Archie, Volume Five: The Heart of Riverdale	Archie #23–27	TPB	144	May 14, 2018	978-1-68255-970-3
6	Archie, Volume Six	Archie #28–32	TPB	144	October 30, 2018	978-1-68255-869-0
7	Archie by Nick Spencer, Volume 1	Archie #700–704	TPB	144	September 10, 2019	978-1-68255-783-9
8	Archie by Nick Spencer, Volume 2: Archie and Sabrina	Archie #705–709	TPB	144	April 14, 2020	978-1-64576-979-8
9	Archie & Katy Keene	Archie #710-713	TPB	120	September 10, 2020	978-1645769484
Jughead
1	Jughead Vol. 1	Jughead #1–6, Archie #7	TPB	168	July 26, 2016	978-1627388931
2	Jughead Vol. 2	Jughead #7–11, Josie and the Pussycats #1	TPB	144	March 14, 2017	978-1682559987
3	Jughead Vol. 3	Jughead #12–16, Josie and the Pussycats #6	TPB	144	November 14, 2017	978-1682559567
4	Jughead's Time Police	Jughead's Time Police #1–5	TPB	144	February 18, 2020	978-1799516156
Betty & Veronica
1	Betty & Veronica by Adam Hughes	Betty and Veronica #1–3, Jughead vol. 3 #1	TPB	104	November 28, 2017	978-1682559857
2	Betty & Veronica: Vixens Vol. 1	Betty & Veronica: Vixens #1–5	TPB	136	July 24, 2018	978-1682558997
3	Betty & Veronica: Vixens Vol. 2	Betty & Veronica: Vixens #6–10	TPB	136	December 4, 2018	978-1682558799
4	Betty & Veronica: Senior Year	Betty and Veronica #1-5	TPB	144	October 8, 2019	978-1682557914
Josie and the Pussycats
1	Josie and the Pussycats Vol. 1	Josie and the Pussycats #1–5, Jughead #9	TPB	144	June 13, 2017	978-1682559895
2	Josie and the Pussycats Vol. 2	Josie and the Pussycats #6–9, Betty and Veronica: Vixens #1 Preview	TPB	104	February 20, 2018	978-1682559178
Reggie and Me
1	Reggie and Me	Reggie and Me #1–5, Your Pal Archie #1	TPB	144	October 17, 2017	978-1682559420
The Archies
Archie Comics Present: The Archies and Other Stories		The Archies one-shot, Big Moose one-shot, Jughead: The Hunger one-shot	TPB	136	October 3, 2017	978-1682559444
1	The Archies Vol. 1	The Archies one-shot, The Archies #1–3	TPB	144	June 19, 2018	978-1682558935
2	The Archies Vol. 2	The Archies #4–7	TPB	104	November 20, 2018	978-1682558751
Sabrina the Teenage Witch
1	Sabrina the Teenage Witch	Sabrina the Teenage Witch #1-5	TPB	144	December 10, 2019	978-1682558058
2	Sabrina the Teenage Witch: Something Wicked	Sabrina the Teenage Witch: Something Wicked #1-5	TPB	144	April 6, 2021	978-1645769620

=== Oversized hardcovers and trade paperbacks ===
#	Title	Material collected	Format	Pages	Released	ISBN
Archie
1	Archie: Varsity Edition, Volume One	Archie #1–12	HC	352	March 12, 2019	978-1-68255-839-3
2	Archie: Varsity Edition, Volume Two	Archie #13–22	HC	288	November 12, 2019	978-1-68255-799-0
3	Archie: Varsity Edition, Volume Three	Archie #23–32	HC	288	TBA	978-1-64576-997-2
Sabrina the Teenage Witch
1	Sabrina the Teenage Witch: The Book of Magic	Sabrina the Teenage Witch #1–5, Sabrina the Teenage Witch: Something Wicked #1–5, Sabrina the Teenage Witch Holiday Special	TPB	256	TBA	979-8889673200

=== Compact trade paperbacks ===
#	Title	Material collected	Format	Pages	Released	ISBN
Archie
1	Archie: New Riverdale Compact Comics Edition	Archie #1–6	TPB	152	September 29, 2026	979-8894883168
Sabrina the Teenage Witch
1	Sabrina: New Riverdale Compact Comics Edition	Sabrina the Teenage Witch #1–5	TPB	152	October 13, 2026	979-8894883274
Jughead
1	Jughead: New Riverdale Compact Comics Edition	Jughead #1–6	TPB	152	October 27, 2026	979-8894883298
