= Archie (comic book) =

Series of comic books

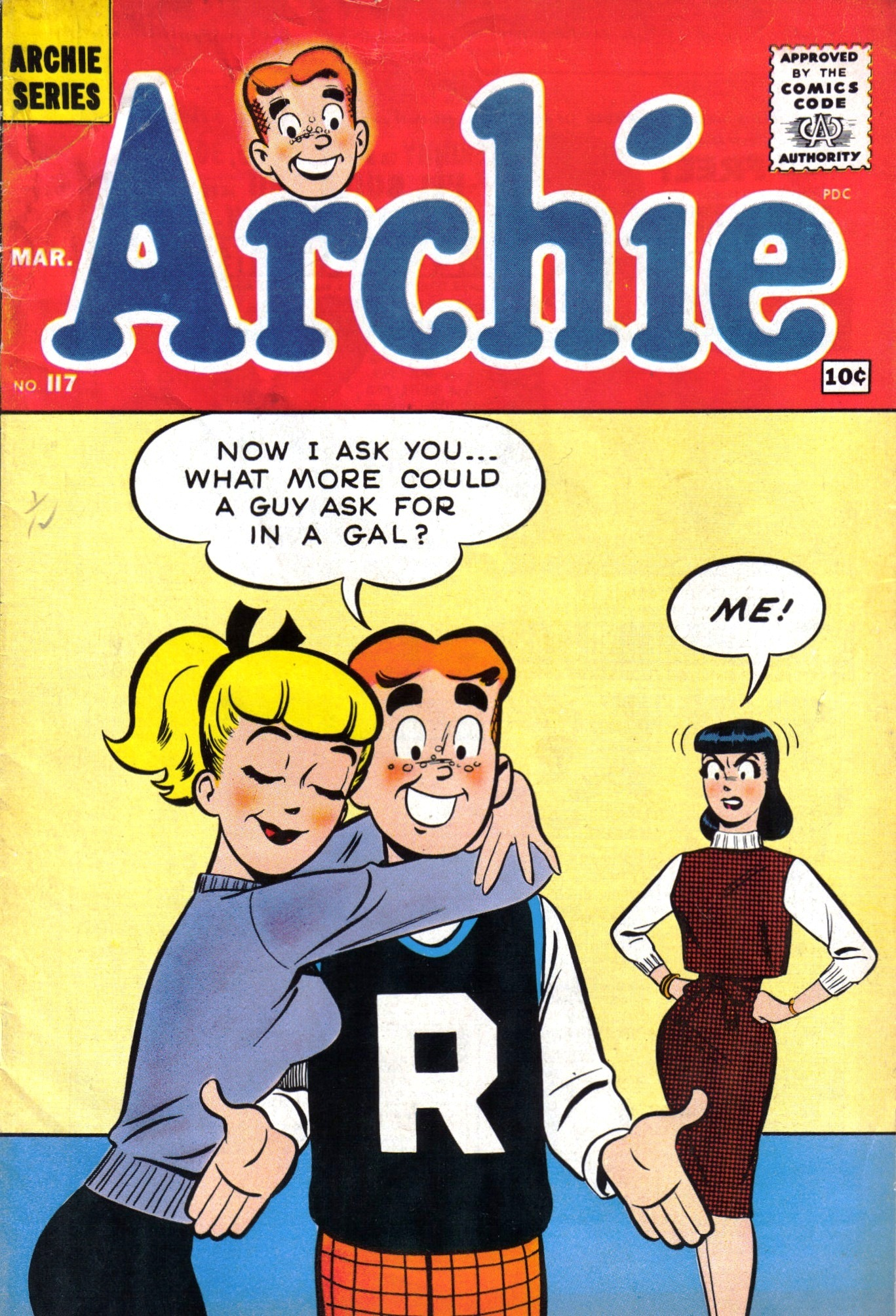
- Cover of Archie #117 (March 1961), featuring the love triangle between titular character Archie, Betty and Veronica

Publication information
- Publisher: Archie Comics
- Schedule: Monthly
- Format: Ongoing series
- Publication date: (vol. 1); Winter 1942 – June 2015 (vol. 2); July 2015 – September 2018 (vol. 1 cont.); October 2018 – September 2020 (vol. 3); September 2026 – present
- No. of issues: (vol. 1) 666 (#1–666) (vol. 2) 32 (#1–32) (vol. 1 cont.) 15 (#699–713) (vol. 3) 1 (as of September 2026 cover date)
- Main character(s): Archie Andrews; Betty Cooper; Veronica Lodge; Jughead Jones; Reggie Mantle

Creative team
- Written by: List: (vol. 1) Various (vol. 2) Mark Waid Ian Flynn (#28–32) (vol. 1 cont.) Ian Flynn (#699) Nick Spencer (#700–709) Mariko Tamaki (#706–713) Kevin Panetta (#710–713) (vol. 3) Ben H. Winters
- Artist: List: (vol. 1) Various (vol. 2) Fiona Staples (#1–3) Annie Wu (#4) Veronica Fish (#5–10) Thomas Pitilli and Ryan Jampole (#11–12) Joe Eisma (#13–17) Pete Woods (#18–22) Audrey Mok and Kelly Fitzpatrick (#23–32) (vol. 1 cont.) Various (#699) Marguerite Sauvage (#700–702) Sandy Jarrell (#702–705, #708–709) Jenn St. Onge (#706–707) Laura Braga (#710–713) (vol. 3) Fábio Moon

Archie (also known as Archie Comics) is an American comic book series (published from 1942 through 2020 in two volumes) featuring the Archie Comics character Archie Andrews. The character first appeared in Pep Comics #22 (cover dated December 1941). Archie proved to be popular enough to warrant his own self-titled ongoing comic book series which began publication in the winter of 1942. The last issue of the first series was published in June 2015.

A second series began publication in July 2015 (briefly replacing the first series), featuring a reboot of the Archie universe with a new character design aesthetic and a more mature story format and scripting, aimed at older, contemporary teenage and young adult readers. It ran until September 2018. Archie Comics resumed the first series in October 2018. The title concluded in September 2020.

A third series began publication in September 2026, as part of a partnership between Archie Comics and Oni Press. Like the second series, it features a more realistic character design aesthetic and serves as a reintroduction to "America’s favorite teenager," ahead of Archie’s 85th anniversary.

== Publication history ==
Archie first appeared in Pep Comics #22 in 1941 and soon became the most popular character in the comic. Due to his popularity, he was given his own series which debuted in winter 1942 titled Archie Comics. Starting with issue #114, the title was shortened to simply Archie. The series ended with issue #666 (June 2015) to make way for a new series set in Archie Comics' "New Riverdale".

A new volume of Archie debuted in July 2015 as part of the New Riverdale relaunch. It is written by Mark Waid with art by Fiona Staples. Archie Comics Publisher/CEO Jon Goldwater has said that the new series will harken back to the comic's roots by showcasing more edgy and humorous stories as well as present the origins for the character and his friends as well as how the famous love triangle between Archie, Betty, and Veronica began.

Fiona Staples left the series after issue #3 while Annie Wu provided artwork for the fourth issue. Veronica Fish was the guest artist for the fifth and sixth issues before being named the regular artist for the series in February 2016. Fish left the series after issue #10 but continued to provide the regular cover art up to issue #12. Thomas Pitilli and Ryan Jampole provided guest artwork for issues #11 and #12 with Joe Eisma being named the new regular artist starting with issue #13. Pete Woods took over as series artist beginning with issue #18 in March 2017. Woods served as the artist until #22 in July 2017. Audrey Mok & Kelly Fitzpatrick provided artwork from #23 onward in August 2017.

In December 2025, Oni Press and Archie Comics announced a wide-ranging publishing partnership set to begin in Fall 2026 with three new ongoing, monthly comic series: Archie, Sabrina the Teenage Witch, and Archie in Hell. The first issue sold out at the distributor level and received a second, third, and fourth printing.

== Volume 1 (1942–2015) ==
=== Significant issues ===
- #429 (Love Showdown, Part 1)

Issue #429 started one of Archie Comics most famous story lines, the Love Showdown where Archie gets a love letter in the mail and Betty and Veronica both swear it wasn't from them. The story was continued in Betty #19, Betty and Veronica #82, and concluded with Veronica #39.

- #587–591 (Freshman Year)

A five-issue storyline that takes Archie and his friends back to their freshman year at Riverdale High. It reveals the beginning of the "eternal love triangle," the introduction of Mr. Weatherbee as principal of Riverdale High, the formation of Moose and Midge's relationship, and other Archie staples.

- #600–606 (Archie Marries Veronica/Archie Marries Betty)

In May 2009, Archie Comics released plans for what they would call "The Archie Story Of The Century" and announced that Archie Andrews would ask Veronica Lodge to marry him in Archie Comics # 600, the first issue of a six-part story arc detailing their engagement, marriage and life together. The publishers of Archie Comics did not expect the response they received from readers and longtime fans telling them they made a mistake in Archie's choice. The New York Times later revealed that the whole story would be simply a fantasy and that the first half of the story would show Archie's life with Veronica, and the second half would show his life with Betty.

- #608–609 (The Archies & Josie and the Pussycats)

This two-issue arc follows Archie Andrews and Valerie Smith falling in love when their two bands go on tour together. This is Archie Comics' first interracial relationship.

- #627–630 (Archie Meets KISS)

When one of Sabrina the Teenage Witch’s spells goes awry and overruns Riverdale with monsters, Archie and his friends turn to Kiss, four supernatural heroes with their sights set on the frightening invaders and their mysterious weapon, the Dynasty Amulet.

- #631–634 (Archie Marries Valerie)

The four issue arc follows a potential future where Archie married Valerie Smith and had a daughter with her named Star. It is similar to the Archie Marries Veronica/Archie Marries Betty arc. Issue #634 details a bunch of potential futures where Archie may have married Cheryl Blossom, Sabrina Spellman or Ethel Muggs.

- #641–644 (Archie Meets Glee)

Archie and his friends cross paths with the cast of Glee thanks to one of Dilton's science experiments gone wrong.

- #656 (Here Comes Harper!)

Features the first appearance of Veronica's cousin, Harper, who is physically disabled and needs to use a wheelchair to get around.

=== Collected editions ===
Early issues of Archie have been collected into hardcover 'Archive Editions' by Dark Horse Comics, including original games pages and ads. IDW published archival hardback editions titled Archie's Americana which collect key issues from each decade since the 1940s. Similar hardbacks were produced showcasing work by favourite Archie creators.

Some key Archie storylines have also been collected as trade paperbacks.

==== Dark Horse Archive Editions ====
Title	ISBN	Release date	Collected material
Archie Archives Volume One	978-1-59582-716-6	May 10, 2011	Pep Comics #22–38, Jackpot Comics #4–8, Archie Comics #1–2
Archie Archives Volume Two	978-1-59582-791-3	September 27, 2011	Jackpot Comics #9, Pep Comics #39–45, Archie Comics #3–6
Archie Archives Volume Three	978-1-59582-833-0	November 22, 2011	Pep Comics #46–50, Archie Comics #7–10
Archie Archives Volume Four	978-1-59582-856-9	February 14, 2012	Pep Comics #51–53, Archie Comics #11–14
Archie Archives Volume Five	978-1-59582-857-6	May 1, 2012	Pep Comics #54–56, Archie Comics #15–18
Archie Archives Volume Six	978-1-59582-915-3	August 14, 2012	Pep Comics #57–58, Archie Comics #19–22
Archie Archives Volume Seven	978-1-59582-977-1	November 13, 2012	Pep Comics #59–61, Archie Comics #23–25, Laugh Comics #20–21
Archie Archives Volume Eight	978-1-59582-995-5	March 19. 2013	Pep Comics #62–64, Archie Comics #26–28, Laugh Comics #23–24
Archie Archives Volume Nine	978-1-61655-2855	March 19, 2014	Pep Comics #65–67, Archie Comics #29–31, Laugh Comics #25–26
Archie Archives Volume Ten	978-1-61655-3975	August 27, 2014	Pep Comics #67–69, Archie Comics #32–34, Laugh Comics #27–28
Archie Archives Volume Eleven	978-1-61655-7027	July 1, 2015	Pep Comics #70–72, Archie Comics #35–36, Laugh Comics #29–31
Archie Archives Volume Twelve	978-1-61655-7058	February 10, 2016	Pep Comics #73–75, Archie Comics #37–39, Laugh Comics #32–34
Archie Archives Volume Thirteen	978-1-5067-0020-5	October 19, 2016	Pep Comics #76–78, Archie Comics #40—41 Laugh Comics #35–37

==== IDW Collections ====
Title	ISBN	Release date	Collected material
Archie's Americana Volume 1: Best of the 1940s	978-1-60010-931-7	September 6, 2011	Pep Comics #22, 25–26, 31, Jackpot Comics #6, Archie Comics #1, 7, 30, Jughead #1, Laugh Comics #23, 25, 27, 28. 36
Archie's Americana Volume 2: Best of the 1950s	978-1-60010-945-4	October 18, 2011	
Archie's Americana Volume 3: Best of the 1960s	978-1-61377-079-5	March 27, 2012	
Archie's Americana Volume 4: Best of the 1970s	978-1-61377-194-5	July 10, 2012	
Archie: The Best of Dan DeCarlo, Volume 1	978-1-60010-654-5	July 6, 2010	
Archie: The Best of Dan DeCarlo. Volume 2	978-1-60010-873-0	April 19, 2011	
Archie" The Best of Dan DeCarlo, Volume 3	978-1-61377-101-3	January 24, 2012	
Archie: The Best of Dan DeCarlo, Volume 4	978-1-61377-481-6	March 19, 2013	
Archie: The Best of Harry Lucey, Volume 1	978-1-60010-993-5	October 18, 2011	
Archie: The Best of Harry Lucey, Volume 2	978-1-61377-214-0	October 19, 2012	
Archie: The Best of Samm Schwartz, Volume 1	978-1-61377-041-2	November 29, 2011	
Archie: The Best of Samm Schwartz, Volume 2	978-1-61377-394-9	December 25, 2012	

==== Trade paperbacks ====
Title	ISBN	Release date	Collected material
Archie: Freshman Year	978-1879794405	May 31, 2009	Archie Comics #587–591
Archie Marries...	978-0-8109-9620-5	October 1, 2010	Archie Comics #600–606
Archie Meets KISS	978-1936975044	May 1, 2012	Archie Comics #627–630
Archie: A Rock N' Roll Romance	978-1-936975-33-4	February 25, 2014	Archie Comics #631–634
Archie Meets Glee	978-1-936975-45-7	August 6, 2013	Archie Comics #641−644
Archie: Rockin' the World	978-1-61988-907-1	January 13, 2015	Archie Comics #650–653

==== 'Best Of' Collections ====
Title	ISBN	Release date	Collected material
The Best of Archie Comics: 75 Years, 75 Stories	978-1-62738-992-1	October 27, 2015	
The Best of Archie Comics Volume One	978-1-61988-955-2	October 25, 2015	

== Volume 2 (2015–2018) ==
Cover of Archie #1 (July 2015) Art by Fiona Staples.

=== Story ===
The first issue focuses on Archie's recent split with Betty Cooper due to the "lipstick incident" that everyone is gossiping about trying to find out what it is. It also sets up the eventual formation of The Archies and the arrival of Veronica Lodge.

=== Reception ===
IGN gave the first issue a 9.5 out of 10 calling it "a joy in every sense of the word. It's a book that warms you, each turn of the page providing a welcome blast of character and heart." as well as calling it "one of the best new debuts to hit shelves this year." Comic Book Resources said that "the publisher [Archie Comics] has created their best book in years." and that it "is must-read comics for anyone looking for fun, engaging characters and beautifully drawn, on-trend style." Meanwhile, Den of Geek gave it five stars calling Fiona Staples' art "glorious" while saying that Mark Waid "does an impressive job of creating a Riverdale that feels modern and real."

=== Collected editions ===
The series has so far been assembled into the following collections:

Title	Format	ISBN	Release date	Collected material	Issues published
Archie, Volume One	Paperback	978-1-62738-867-2	March 29, 2016	Archie #1–6	September 2015 – March 2016
Archie, Volume Two	Paperback	978-1-62738-798-9	November 30, 2016	Archie #7–12	April 2016 – September 2016
Archie, Volume Three	Paperback	978-1-68255-993-2	May 9, 2017	Archie #13–17	October 2016 – April 2017
Archie, Volume Four: Over the Edge	Paperback	978-1-68255-970-3	September 19, 2017	Archie #18–22	May 2017 – July 2017
Archie, Volume Five: The Heart of Riverdale	Paperback	978-1-68255-970-3	May 14, 2018	Archie #23–27	August 2017 – May 2018
Archie, Volume Six	Paperback	978-1-68255-869-0	October 30, 2018	Archie #28–32	May 2018 – September 2018
Archie: Varsity Edition, Volume One	Hardcover	978-1-68255-839-3	March 12, 2019	Archie #1–12	September 2015 – September 2016
Archie: Varsity Edition, Volume Two	Hardcover	978-1-68255-799-0	November 12, 2019	Archie #13–22	October 2016 – July 2017
Archie: Varsity Edition, Volume Three	Hardcover	978-1-64576-997-2	TBD	Archie #23–32	August 2017 – September 2018

== Volume 1 cont. (2018–2020) ==
=== Collected editions ===
Title	Format	ISBN	Release date	Collected material	Issues published
Archie by Nick Spencer, Volume 1	Paperback	978-1-68255-783-9	September 10, 2019	Archie #700–704	November 2018 – May 2019
Archie by Nick Spencer, Volume 2: Archie and Sabrina	Paperback	978-1-64576-979-8	April 14, 2020	Archie #705–709	June 2019 – December 2019
Archie & Katy Keene	Paperback	978-1-64576-948-4	September 10, 2020	Archie #710-713	July 2019 – July 2020

== Cultural impact and legacy ==
Having a nearly eight-decade run, Archie is regarded as an iconic staple of American pop culture. The series codifies several of the archetypes found in subsequent teen and young adult media, such as: the girl next door, the mean girl, the popular jock, and most importantly, the love triangle; the dynamic between Betty, Veronica, and Archie is an example of this particular trope in media.

Archie has been parodied several times in the American stop-motion animation sitcom Robot Chicken on Adult Swim. Beginning with a segment in the episode "Veggies for Sloth", which saw the characters get gruesomely killed off one-by-one in a send-up of the Final Destination franchise. The comics were also the subject of the series' eleventh special, The Bleepin' Robot Chicken Archie Comics Special. The voice cast featured Fred Armisen as Archie, Amy Sedaris as Betty, Betty Gilpin as Veronica, Jason Mantzoukas as Jughead, Ryan Phillippe as Reggie, Jared Harris as Mr. Weatherbee, and Jane Lynch as Miss Grundy. The special also featured characters from other Archie Comics titles, including Sabrina, the Teenage Witch (voiced by Clare Grant), and Josie and the Pussycats; Josie McCoy is voiced by Rachael Leigh Cook, reprising her role from the 2001 film adaptation.

On January 26, 2017, Riverdale, an American teen drama television series based on the Archie comics, premiered on The CW. The cast included KJ Apa as Archie, Lili Reinhart as Betty, Camila Mendes as Veronica, Cole Sprouse as Jughead, and Madelaine Petsch as Cheryl Blossom. The show utilized the characters and locations from the comics, while updating the technology, storylines, lingo, and representation of marginalized groups for modern audiences. Its darker, edgier ambience was a notable departure from the light-hearted tone of the comic series, with a mystery surrounding the murder of Jason Blossom being the lynchpin for the first season's storyline. Upon its announcement, Riverdale was met with a polarized response from the general public; many could not find the appeal of a wholesome, family-friendly stalwart title getting the "subversive" treatment .

Nevertheless, the show enjoyed positive critical reception for its first few seasons, and introduced Archie and its characters to a whole new generation of viewers. Acclaim for the show waned over its lifetime, as audiences and publications alike were baffled by the later seasons' incomprehensible storylines and overall decline in quality. The series finale, "Chapter One Hundred Thirty Seven: Goodbye Riverdale" aired on August 23, 2023, thus concluding a seven-season run. The show's end, coupled with several other shows on the network being cancelled that year, prompted Alex Zalben of Decider to mourn "... a sad ending to one of the most reliably earnest and inclusive places on television, and it's possible we may never know its like again."

Riverdale's success led to the creation of Chilling Adventures of Sabrina, a companion series based on the comic title of the same name. Starring Kiernan Shipka as the title character, it premiered on Netflix on October 26, 2018 and ran for two seasons before its 2020 cancellation as a result of the COVID-19 pandemic. Shipka reprised her role as Sabrina in the season 6 Riverdale episode "Chapter Ninety-Nine: the Witching Hour(s)". A spin-off, Katy Keene, premiered on February 6, 2020, and was cancelled after one season despite positive critical reception.
