= Sabrina the Teenage Witch =

Comic book series

- Sabrina the Teenage Witch #1 (April 1971). Cover art by Dan DeCarlo. Original title is stylized Sabrina: The Teen-Age Witch

Publication information
- Publisher: Archie Comics
- Format: Ongoing series
- Genre: Teen humor
- Publication date: List: (vol. 1) April 1971 – Jan. 1983 (vol. 2) May 1997 – Dec. 1999 (vol. 3) Jan. 2000 – Sept. 2009 (vol. 4) Mar. 2019 – Dec. 2023 (vol. 5) Oct. 2026 – present
- No. of issues: List: (vol. 1): 77 (vol. 2): 32 (vol. 3): 104 (vol. 4): 11 (vol. 5): 1 (as of October 2026 cover date)

Creative team
- Written by: List: (vol. 4) Kelly Thompson Danielle Paige (#11) (vol. 5) Corinna Bechko
- Artist: List: (vol. 4) Veronica Fish Andy Fish (#1–10) (vol. 5) Kano Nick Cagnetti

Sabrina the Teenage Witch is a comic book series published by Archie Comics about the adventures of a fictional American teenager named Sabrina Spellman. Sabrina was created by writer George Gladir and artist Dan DeCarlo, and first appeared in Archie's Madhouse #22 (cover-dated Oct. 1962). Storylines of the character at elementary-school-age appeared under the title "Sabrina -- That Cute Little Witch" in almost all of the Little Archie comics.

The premise is that Sabrina, a "half-witch" – her mother is an ordinary human, or "mortal" as witches refer to them, while her father is a warlock – lives with her two aunts, Hilda and Zelda Spellman, both witches themselves, in the fictional town of Greendale, which is located somewhere near Riverdale, the home of Archie Andrews. Also living with the three women as the family pet is Salem Saberhagen, a warlock who has been turned into a cat as punishment for world domination attempts. Sabrina's primary romantic interest is her mortal boyfriend Harvey Kinkle who, like nearly all the other mortals in Sabrina's world, is unaware she is a witch.

Most of Sabrina's adventures consist of Sabrina either trying to use her powers in secret to help others – witches generally are not allowed to tell mortals about their abilities or existence – or dealing with the day-to-day trials of being a teenager. A recurring theme in Sabrina's stories is her learning more about the proper use of her powers, either through her aunts or from trips to a magical dimension that is the home of various magical/mythological creatures, including other witches. Various names are given to this dimension; the mid-late 2000s comics refer to it as the "Magic Realm", while the live-action sitcom referred to it as the "Other Realm".

The comic's characters have also appeared in various other media formats. The live-action sitcom, in which Sabrina discovers her powers at the age of sixteen, aired for a combined seven seasons on ABC and the WB. Earlier, there had been an animated series produced by Filmation Associates. Another format was a series of paperback novels (see list below) written by various authors, including Nancy Holder, Diana G. Gallagher, and Mel Odom, as well as a late 1990s/early 2000s animated series set in the original Archie Comics continuity, where Sabrina already knows about her powers while in junior high. She is portrayed by Melissa Joan Hart on the live action sitcom and Kiernan Shipka on the Riverdale spin-off, Chilling Adventures of Sabrina.

== Publication history ==
Sabrina the Teenage Witch debuted in Archie's Madhouse (the logo is sometimes given as Archie's Mad House) #22 (Oct. 1962). Created by writer George Gladir and artist Dan DeCarlo. She first appeared in that humor anthology's lead story (the logo then spelled "Teen-Age"), and eventually became one of Archie Comics' major characters, appearing in an animated series and a television sitcom. Gladir recalled in 2007,

I think we both envisioned it as a one-shot and were surprised when fans asked for more. We continued to do Sabrina stories off and on in Mad House until 1969 when we were flabbergasted to hear it was to become an animated [TV series]. When it came to naming Sabrina I decided to name her after a woman I recalled from my junior high school days...who was very active in school affairs, and who assigned a number of us to interview prominent people in the media. In addition, the woman's name had a New England ring to it. Some years later I recalled the woman's name was not Sabrina, but actually Sabra Holbrook.

Sabrina made regular appearances in the comic book Archie's TV Laugh-Out. The title was published from 1969 to 1985, and consisted of 106 issues.

The first volume of Sabrina The Teenage Witch was published from 1971 to 1983, and ran for 77 issues. A new "Sabrina" comic series was introduced shortly after the debut of the 1996 live-action sitcom. This series ran for 32 issues, between 1997 and December 1999. The new series incorporated elements from the live-action sitcom, including modernized fashions and appearances for the aunts, Sabrina's last name and Salem's personality and backstory.

Starting in January 2000, Archie rebooted the series from #1, this time based upon the 2000 animated series (the final issue of the 1997–1999 series had acted as a transition between the two adaptations). This new title was simply titled Sabrina and lasted for 37 issues; issue #38, published in late 2002, again acted as a transition issue, as the series was re-titled Sabrina The Teenage Witch and resumed the conventional high school setting. However, elements of the live-action sitcom (Salem's backstory, the modernized appearances of Hilda and Zelda) were retained, along with the name of Sabrina's hometown (Greendale) from Sabrina the Animated Series being incorporated into the comics. The conventional setting lasted until issue #57, published in 2004, when the comic underwent a manga makeover (see below). The series ended with issue #104 in September 2009.

In November 2018, Archie Comics announced a five-issue miniseries, written by Kelly Thompson and illustrated by the husband-and-wife team of Veronica Fish and Andy Fish, set to launch in the spring of 2019. The series was critically acclaimed, with Thrillist calling it "one of the best comics of the year" and commercially successful. Archie Comics announced a second five-issue miniseries to debut in the winter of 2020 with the same creative team. A special holiday one-shot was published in 2023, which serves as a conclusion to the Thompson-Fish run.

In December 2025, a new ongoing Sabrina the Teenage Witch series was announced by Oni Press and Archie Comics as part of a wide-ranging publishing partnership. Written by Corinna Bechko and illustrated by Kano, it launched in October 2026.

Sabrina also occasionally appears in other Archie Comics as a visiting acquaintance of Archie, Betty Cooper, Veronica Lodge, and Jughead Jones. In Jughead #200 (May 2010), Sabrina reveals to Jughead that she is a witch, which is made use of in a follow-up story. Sabrina and Salem make a notable appearance in the 2012 Archie issue #636, where Salem, as a plot device, performs a spell (against Sabrina's desires) that gender-bends the entire town of Riverdale without the characters noticing the change.

== Volume 1 (1971–1983) ==
=== Collected editions ===
Title	Material collected	Format	Pages	Released	ISBN
Sabrina the Teenage Witch Omnibus Vol. 1	Sabrina the Teenage Witch #1–24, alongside material from Archie’s Mad House and other Archie classics.	Hardcover	776	June 1, 2027	979-8894884707

== Volume 3 (2000–2009) ==
=== Significant Issues ===
- #28 (crossover with Sonic the Hedgehog)

Issue #28 of Sabrina, as well as the Sonic Super Special Crossover Chaos, featured a crossover with Sonic the Hedgehog, in which Sonic was brought to Greendale from Mobius by one of Sabrina's enemies and subsequently brainwashed into attacking Sabrina herself. In this issue, it is mentioned that Salem is a fan of Sonic and has all of his comics and watches Adventures of Sonic the Hedgehog.

- #58–100 (Manga Makeover)

In 2004, beginning with issue #58, the comics were taken over by Tania del Rio with her manga-inspired art and design style. Concurrent with this, the comic ceased to be connected to either the live-action or animated Sabrina series. The comics were then released featuring new characters and a slightly more serious, continuity-heavy plot. The manga Sabrina story wrapped up at issue #100 in 2009, albeit with a few unresolved subplots.

Issues #58–61 of the 'manga makeover' series were reprinted as Sabrina- The Magic Revisited. Then, in 2013, issues #58–67 were reprinted as Sabrina the Teenage Witch: The Magic Within Book 1 in grayscale instead of full-color. Sabrina the Teenage Witch: The Magic Within Book 2 containing issues #68–78 also was reprinted in grayscale instead of full-color. Book 3 and 4 containing issues #79–89 and #90–100, respectively, were also released and, like the first two, were reprinted in gray-scale instead of full color.

Issues #58–100 of the 'manga makeover' series were released digitally as Sabrina Manga #1–43.

- #101–104 (Stories of Young Salem)

A four-issue spin-off miniseries featuring Salem as a young boy (predating his attempts at conquest later in life and his transformation into a cat) was published in 2009. The miniseries was written by Ian Flynn and illustrated by Chad Thomas. The mini-series continued directly on Sabrina's regular series beginning with issue #101, albeit with a different title known as The Magical Tales of Young Salem. This was done as a method to cut newsstands costs. The new series is partially based on a two-part story which occurred during the manga Sabrina series issues #93 and #94, which was a flashback about Salem's near-rise to power. As of issue #104, the first The Magical Tales of Young Salem mini-series was concluded, but apparently the comic book series was subsequently suspended for internal reasons with no further Young Salem stories announced.

== Volume 4: New Riverdale (2019–2023) ==
In 2015, "New Riverdale" was introduced, rebooting the entire original Archie lineup in favor of a realistic aesthetic aimed at older readers. Sabrina debuted in the "New Riverdale" with Jughead #9. She continued to appear for issues #10 and #11.

In December 2016, it was announced that a Sabrina the Teenage Witch one-shot would debut in March 2017 as part of Archie Comics' "pilot season". This one-shot would have been greenlit into a full series if there was enough fan interest. However, in May 2017 it was revealed that the one-shot was cancelled, with no intention of releasing it at a later date.

An 11-issue Sabrina the Teenage Witch series eventually joined the "New Riverdale" universe in 2019, written by Kelly Thompson and illustrated by Veronica Fish and Andy Fish. It consists of two five-issue miniseries and a one-shot special.

=== Story Arcs ===
==== Volume 1 (Issues #1–5) ====
The first issue focuses on Sabrina, newly relocated to Greendale with her aunts Hilda and Zelda, struggling with balancing the double life of high school and her burgeoning powers. The first volume ends with the teenage witch having to protect her small town from the dangers of dark magic and those who wield it.

==== Volume 2: Something Wicked (Issues #1–5) ====
"Something Wicked" picks up after Sabrina saved her friends, her family, and Greendale at the end of Volume 1. She's still having trouble balancing the mortal and witch parts of herself, but now she's in a love triangle and being blackmailed. The fifth issue features the first comic appearance of Ambrose, based on the version from Netflix's Chilling Adventures adaptation, telling Sabrina she had been accepted into a magical academy.

==== Holiday Special #1 ====
The one-shot features two stories. The first, "The Longest Night," shows Sabrina attending her new magical school, and helping her classmates rescue a fellow friend from a demon-beast. The second, "A Very Spellman Solstice," features Sabrina's aunts and parents in their teenage years trying to save the "Yuel Festival" from the spirit of one of Sabrina's ancestors.

=== Collected editions ===
Title	Material collected	Format	Pages	Released	ISBN
Sabrina the Teenage Witch	Sabrina the Teenage Witch #1-5	Paperback	144	December 10, 2019	978-1682558058
Sabrina the Teenage Witch: Something Wicked	Sabrina the Teenage Witch: Something Wicked #1-5	Paperback	144	April 6, 2021	978-1645769620
Sabrina: New Riverdale Compact Comics Edition	Sabrina the Teenage Witch #1–5	Paperback	152	October 13, 2026	979-8894883274

== Characters ==
This is a list and description of the characters that appear in the Sabrina comic books. For information about the characters from the live-action TV sitcom, see List of Sabrina the Teenage Witch (1996 TV series) characters.

=== Main characters ===
- Sabrina Spellman: the lead character of the series. In the early comic series, Sabrina is a well-meaning girl, but she struggles with constant pressure to be "bad" from all the other witches around her, especially her aunts, as well as learning to master her powers. Later comics incarnations (and media spinoffs) present other witches, including her aunts, as largely "good", though Sabrina still struggles to fully master her powers.
- Hilda Spellman: Sabrina's aunt. In the earlier comics, Hilda is portrayed dressed as and behaving in a more stereotypical witch manner, including being cranky, disliking mortals (particularly Harvey), and prone to using her powers for revenge or resolving petty disputes. The 1990s comics toned down Hilda's cranky behavior and modernized her clothing and physical appearance.
- Zelda Spellman: Sabrina's aunt. In the earlier comics, Zelda (like Hilda) also was dressed in stereotypical witch's clothes, but unlike Hilda, was the more compassionate and kindly of the two. The 1990s comics modernized Zelda's clothing and physical appearance. In the earliest comics, she was supposed to find a husband within a year or else lose her powers.
- Harvey Kinkle: Sabrina's boyfriend, a mortal who is unaware of Sabrina's being a witch. Harvey is presented as being sweet and loyal, but also accident-prone (similar to Archie).
- Salem Saberhagen: the Spellmans' American shorthair cat. Salem was formerly a witch, who was turned into a cat as punishment by the Witches' Council for plotting to take over the world. Salem has the ability to speak and possesses a sarcastic and somewhat self-centered attitude. The name "Salem" refers to the Salem Witch Trials of 1692. Comics published before the late 1990s presented Salem as an ordinary orange-colored cat unable to speak. Since the late 1990s, Salem inherited the elements of his live-action sitcom counterpart, including the backstory of formerly being a witch, the ability to speak, and being colored black. Since the late 1990s, reprints of earlier Sabrina stories in Archie digests usually recolor Salem as black.

=== Other recurring characters ===
- Witches' Council: A council of powerful witches that oversees the other witches.
- Enchantra: The Queen of Witches, and head of the Witches' Council. Most of her appearances were in Sabrina: Secrets of a Teenage Witch.
- Della, the Spellmans' head witch. A strict, short-tempered authority figure, Della does not approve of Sabrina using magic to help others. Della largely appears in the earlier comics. In the late 1990s comics, she appears as Enchantra's secretary.
- Rosalind: Sabrina's arch-enemy in the original comic book stories from Archie's Mad House. She was constantly fighting with Sabrina over the same boys. In later stories, their adversarial relationship is dropped. Instead, Rosalind is depicted as a teenage witch and is much more friendly with Sabrina.

=== Sabrina's cousins ===
- Ambrose: Sabrina's cousin, a witch. He had an acute sense of fashion and showmanship and, in the Filmation animated series, an effete voice and mannerisms. Ambrose does not appear in any of the later media spin-offs; his role in the comics since the 1990s has largely been replaced by Salem. He has since returned in the Chilling Adventures of Sabrina, along with his cobra familiars, Nag and Nagaina.
- Esmeralda: Sabrina's younger cousin from the comic book series who is also a witch, but has an obnoxious, bratty attitude. Her character is similar to Sabrina's young cousin Amanda from the live-action TV sitcom (who was played by actress Melissa Joan Hart's real-life younger sister, Emily Hart).
- Brucie: Sabrina's young mystical prankster cousin from Sabrina the Teenage Witch #18 (1974) that she has to babysit.
- Al: Sabrina's cousin that dresses like a cowboy. He uses magic to help Sabrina's boyfriend Harvey play music in Sabrina the Teenage Witch #2 (1971)

=== Characters from the Gravestone Heights stories ===
A 1990s storyline that was featured in non-Sabrina Archie Issues saw Sabrina and her aunts relocate for a time to the town of "Gravestone Heights", which is populated by various monsters and creatures.

- Eye-da: A student from Riverdale High with a giant eyeball for a head. She appeared at least twice in the late 1950s in Archie stories, usually as only an unexpected visual punchline at the end of a typical story featuring Betty and Veronica. However, she became a significant character many years later in one incarnation of Sabrina the Teenage Witch. When Sabrina and her aunts moved to Gravestone Heights, a city inhabited by witches, ghosts and monsters, Eye-da (who seemed less out of place there) became one of Sabrina's best friends.
- Francine: Sabrina's ghoulish friend that resembles the Bride of Frankenstein.
- Cleara Glass: One of Sabrina's best friends in the Gravestone Heights series. Cleara is an invisible girl, except for her eyes and mouth.
- Milton: Sabrina's vampire boyfriend. In the original cast list of Gravestone Heights, Milton is listed as a friend of Sabrina's that is a mummy who is "all wrapped up in himself", while Sabrina's "very vein" vampire boyfriend is named Drac. In later comics, it was explained that Milton had to wrap himself up like a mummy to protect himself from the sunlight.
- Ms. Reaper: A teacher at Gravestone Heights "whose tests are deadly".

=== Characters from the manga stories ===
- Batty Bartholomew: Called "Batty" as a nickname because, when his memory was originally erased, he went kind of crazy. One of the original Four Blades leaders. Was Sabrina's tutor and helped her become good again after using the dark side of her wand. Sabrina restored his memory. The "new Four Blades" have joined forces with the "old Four Blades" once Sabrina and the other "new Four Blades" realized the true intentions of the Four Blades movement.
- Libby Chessler: A cheerleader, Sabrina's arch-enemy. Libby always is trying to steal Harvey from Sabrina. Libby was introduced in the live-action TV series and is similar to the original version of Rosalind from the comic book series. She was later integrated into the comic books.
- Galiena: Wizardress, Czarina of Decree (i.e. chief enforcer) of the Magic Council. She was Sabrina's "boss" when Sabrina interned there for a summer.
- LLandra da Silva: Another teenage witch and Sabrina's best friend. Also lives in the mortal realm, but goes to a different high school. Was, but is no longer, dating Shinji Yamagi.
- Professor Lunata: A female satyr who is one of the teachers at Charm School.
- Narayan: A teenage merman and LLandra's current boyfriend. He was given the ability to walk on land by Sabrina. He joined the Four Blades after that to get closer to LLandra and also became friends with Sabrina and Shinji.
- Amy Reinhardt: Amy is a popular girl at Sabrina's high school who often competes with Sabrina in various forms, but most notably for Harvey's attention. Amy appeared mostly in the comics in the 1990s and 2000s, though her character is similar to Libby from the live action TV series, and Katy from the 1996 TV movie. In Sabrina: Secrets of a Teenage Witch, she is considerably nicer, albeit still somewhat arrogant.
- Gwenevive Ricci: A mortal goth and wannabe witch who is a friend of Sabrina's.
- Queen Seles: Elven sorceress and Queen of the Magic Council. After Seles was "rescued" by Nocturna and Salem, she went around the magic realm with a "family", but that never included Salem. Nocturna read his mind, while believing that he loved her. She realized that all of Salem's thoughts were of war and destruction. She tells Sabrina what the Four Blades really did, as well as her story of how she lost all her magic, and why the Mana Tree is dying.
- Shinji Yamagi: A teenage witch whom Sabrina met while attending a spellcasting school. He tries to compete with Harvey for Sabrina's affections. He appears in Secrets as a bully character who hates Sabrina, and is Enchantra's son.

== In other media ==
=== Animated television series ===
==== Sabrina the Teenage Witch (1970) ====
In 1970, CBS debuted a Filmation boy-oriented animated superhero fantasy sitcom, The Sabrina the Teenage Witch Show, a spin-off from its popular Archie franchise. It included shorts with her Universal Horror-inspired cousins, the Groovie Goolies, and ran for four seasons, with the Goolies spinning off into their own series in 1971.

==== Sabrina: The Animated Series ====
In 1999, Melissa Joan Hart provided the voice of Sabrina's two aunts for Sabrina: The Animated Series. This series lasted one season and produced 65 episodes. Broadcasting & Cable reported that a second season was in the works, which was reworked as Sabrina's Secret Life. Before the follow-up, the television/direct-to-video movie Sabrina: Friends Forever made its debut in Nickelodeon. Both of those Sabrina animated shows and the movie are all produced by DIC Entertainment. Unlike the sitcom, the DIC series takes place in the original Archie Comics canon and so the characters live in Greendale.

DiC had also announced a spin-off that revolved around Salem the Cat, but no further information on that came out.

==== Sabrina: Secrets of a Teenage Witch ====
In 2011, Archie Comics announced plans to produce a new animated series based on Sabrina the Teenage Witch to be released in late 2012. The show featured CGI animation that was produced by MoonScoop, and a brand new look for the Sabrina characters. As of October 2012, The Hub has picked up the series, and it finally debuted on air on October 12, 2013.

=== Live-action television series ===
==== Sabrina the Teenage Witch (1996) ====
In September 1996, the live-action television film spawned the Sabrina the Teenage Witch television series. Both the television film and sitcom starred Melissa Joan Hart as Sabrina. The fictional home of the series was moved to Westbridge, Massachusetts. Her original last name, Spellman, was retained, and her mother was stated to be mortal. The sitcom ran for seven seasons and included two television movies and one soundtrack release.

==== Riverdale ====
Sabrina appeared in Chapter Ninety-Nine: The Witching Hour(s).

==== Chilling Adventures of Sabrina ====
In December 2017, a live-action adaptation of the comic book series Chilling Adventures of Sabrina, produced by Warner Bros. Television and Berlanti Productions, with Roberto Aguirre-Sacasa, Lee Toland Krieger, Greg Berlanti, Sarah Schechter, and Jon Goldwater as executive producers, was picked up by the online streaming service Netflix for a two-season order. Starring Kiernan Shipka as Sabrina Spellman, the first part of the series was released worldwide on Netflix on October 26, 2018, with a special Christmas episode being released later that year on December 14. The second part was released on April 5, 2019, the third part was released on January 24, 2020, and the fourth part was released on December 31, 2020.

==== Acemi Cadı ====
In 2006, a Turkish version called Acemi Cadı was released and starred Merve Boluğur.

=== Films ===
==== Sabrina the Teenage Witch (1996 film) ====
In 1996, the comic was adapted into a live-action made-for-television film of the same name. In this version, Sabrina lives in Riverdale (fictional hometown of the Archie characters), rather than Greendale, as it was in the comic books. Her last name is Sawyer instead of Spellman, also it is said that both her parents are witches.

==== Sabrina Goes to Rome ====
A film starring Melissa Joan Hart, it follows American teenage witch Sabrina and her food-obsessed magical talking cat and mouse to Rome, the last whereabout of her 16th-century aunt Sophia.

==== Sabrina Down Under ====
The third Sabrina film finds the title character trying to save mermaids from environmental pollution and a man trying to alter Australia's waterways.
