= Axios HQ =

Enterprise software company

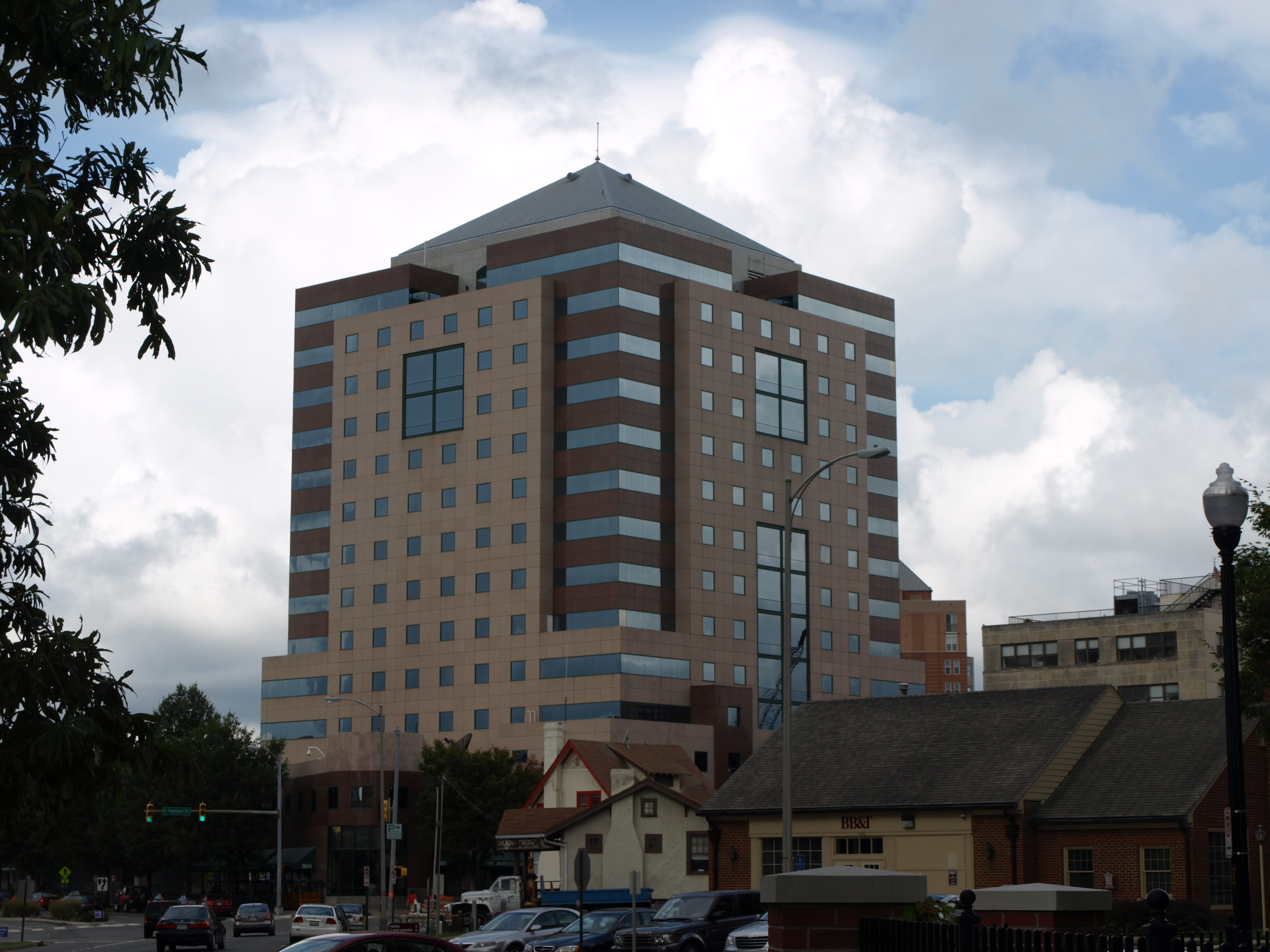
- Axios HQ's headquarters is at 3100 Clarendon Boulevard in Arlington, Virginia.
- Company type: Private
- Industry: Software
- Founded: February 2021
- Founders: Roy Schwartz, Jim VandeHei, Mike Allen
- Headquarters: Arlington, Virginia, United States
- Key people: Roy Schwartz (CEO)
- Products: Internal communications software
- Revenue: $10 million (2023)
- Website: axioshq.com

Axios HQ is an American enterprise software company. Its main product is a platform that allows its clients to use so-called "smart brevity," a bullet point-based journalism style developed by the founders of media company Axios, to distribute their own communications.

== History ==
Axios HQ was launched Roy Schwartz, Jim VandeHei and Mike Allen in February 2021 by media company Axios. Axios HQ was spun out after the parent media company was sold to Cox Enterprises for approximately $525 million in 2022.

Within eight months of its formation, Axios HQ had generated over $1 million in revenue from its software licensing business, which formats organizations' communications into Axios-style "smart brevity" bullet points.

By 2023, Axios HQ had surpassed $10 million in annual recurring revenue and had expanded its offerings to include integrations with platforms like Slack and Microsoft Teams. This growth was supported by a $20 million Series A funding round completed in March 2023, co-led by Glade Brook Capital Partners and Greycroft Partners.

== Products ==
The Axios HQ platform provides "smart brevity" training and editorial services, AI-powered newsletter creation and distribution software, and analytics.
