= Quincy Quarries Reservation =

Recreation area in Quincy, Massachusetts

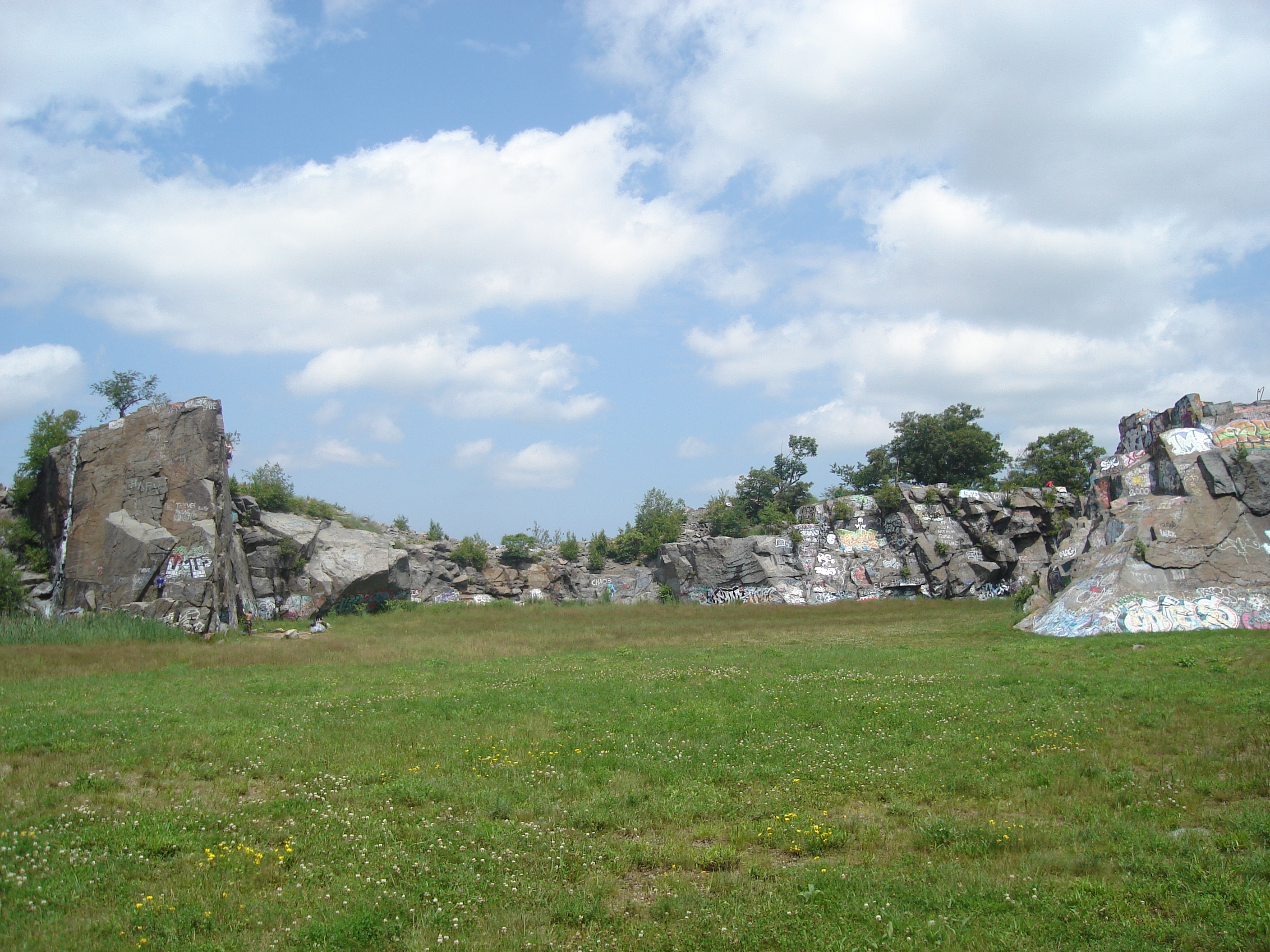
- View across earth-filled quarry, 2009

- Location within Greater Boston area Location within Massachusetts Location within the United States
- Location: Quincy, Massachusetts, United States
- Coordinates: 42°14′35″N 71°2′4″W
- Area: 22 acres (8.9 ha)
- Established: 1985
- Administrator: Massachusetts Department of Conservation and Recreation
- Website: Official website

The Quincy Quarries is a 22-acre (8.9 ha) public recreation area in Quincy, Massachusetts, commemorating the site of the Granite Railway—often credited as being the first railroad in the United States. The former quarries produced granite for over a century, leaving problematic excavations that ultimately were taken over and filled in to protect public safety. The reservation is owned and operated by the Massachusetts Department of Conservation and Recreation.

== History ==
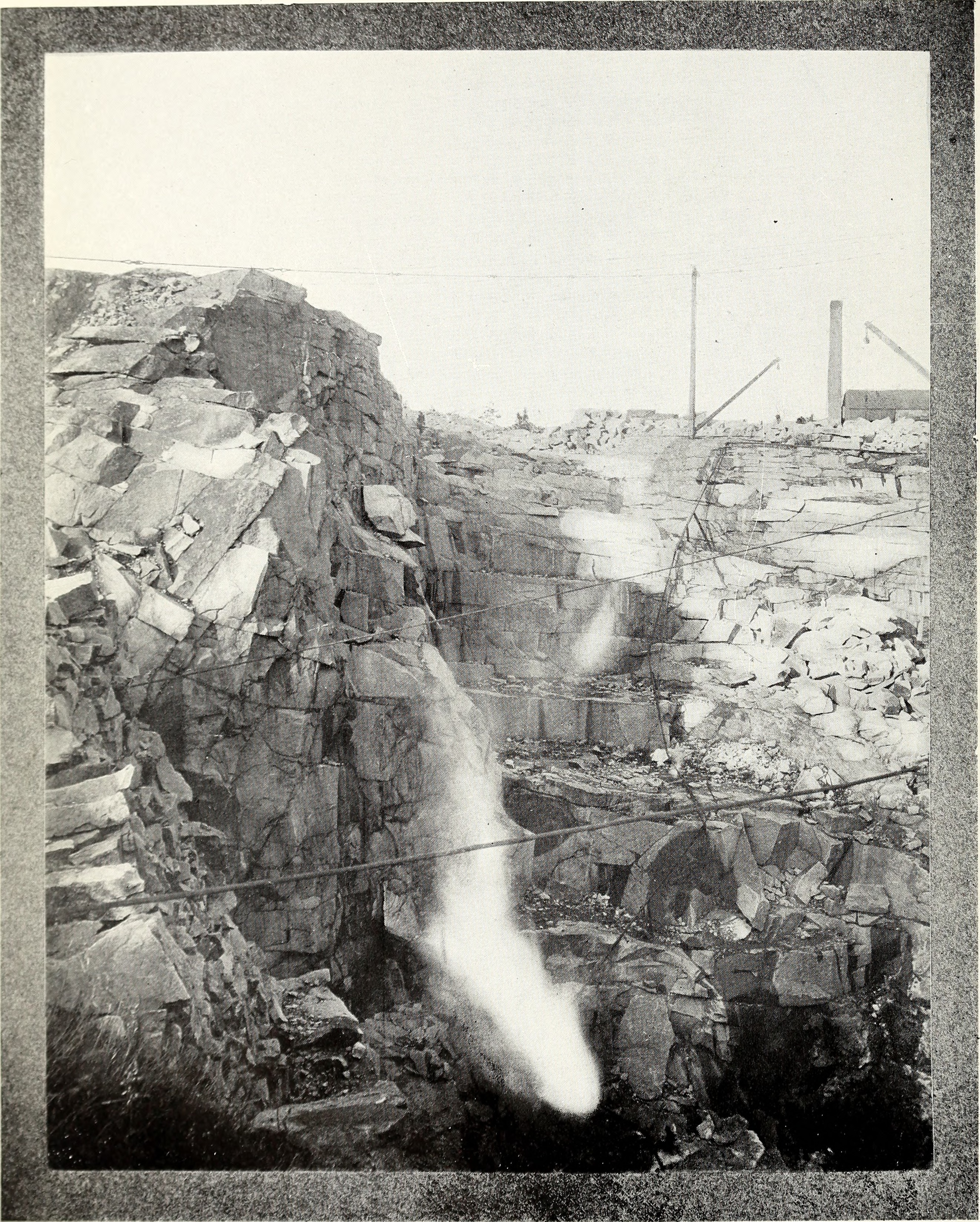
The quarry in 1912.

In 1825, after an exhaustive search throughout New England, Solomon Willard selected the Quincy site as the source of stone for the Bunker Hill Monument in Charlestown. Willard bought 4-acres of quarry to be able to deliver the estimated 9,000 tons of granite needed. After many delays and obstructions, a charter was granted on March 4, 1826, for the construction of a railroad to help move the granite. The "Granite Railway" was designed and built by railway pioneer Gridley Bryant and began operations on October 7, 1826. The granite from these quarries became famous throughout the nation, and stone cutting quickly became Quincy's principal economic activity. Eventually, the quarries began to experience a long-term decline during the First World War and the Great Depression due to shipbuilding efforts and drops in demand for granite, respectively. These events marked the end of the "Granite City" era.

=== Later use ===
The last active quarry closed in 1963. After their abandonment, the open quarries filled with rainwater and ground water. The flooded quarries soon became a popular spot for cliff jumping. However, many people were injured—and killed—while diving into the quarries from great heights. Between 1960 and 1998, 51 people were killed due to cliff diving. This led the police and the city of Quincy to grapple with what to do with this abandoned space.

A rock climber in the 90s.

During this period, the quarries were also discovered by rock climbers. In 1968, A Guide to Quincy Quarries by Willie Crowther and Tony Thompson, published by the MIT Outing Club, contained information about climbing in and around the quarries; a second edition was published in 1970. Boston Rocks, a guidebook by Larry LaForge, was published by the MIT Outing Club in 1987; a second edition by Richard Doucette and Susan Ruff came out in 2003 with a copyright update in 2008.

During the 1980s old telephone poles and trees were added to discourage cliff jumping. Unfortunately, these were quickly waterlogged and sank two feet underwater where they were not visible to the cliff jumpers above. The injury and fatality rate skyrocketed. Often, divers sent to look for missing cliff jumpers would unexpectedly find other bodies instead.

The quarries, once drained of water, became a very popular canvas for graffiti artists.

=== Quincy Quarries Reservation ===
In 1985, Boston's Metropolitan District Commission purchased 22 acres, including Granite Railway Quarry, as the Quincy Quarries Reservation. A solution to the public safety problem was finally found with the massive Big Dig highway project in Boston. Dirt from the new highway tunnels was trucked in to fill the main quarries. This opened up new sections of rock to climbers, and the site was subsequently improved to encourage public use of the reservation. The reservation is connected to the trail system of the Blue Hills Reservation and features hiking, rock climbing and views of the Boston skyline.

== In popular culture ==
Scenes from the movies Gone Baby Gone (2007) and The Invention of Lying (2009) were filmed in the Quincy Quarries.

Geeks & Greeks (2016), a graphic novel about pranks at MIT and fraternity hazing, features a climactic sequence set at the Quincy Quarries in their water-filled days.

== See also ==
- Granite Railway
