= Reggie and Me =

Ongoing comics book series in 1950

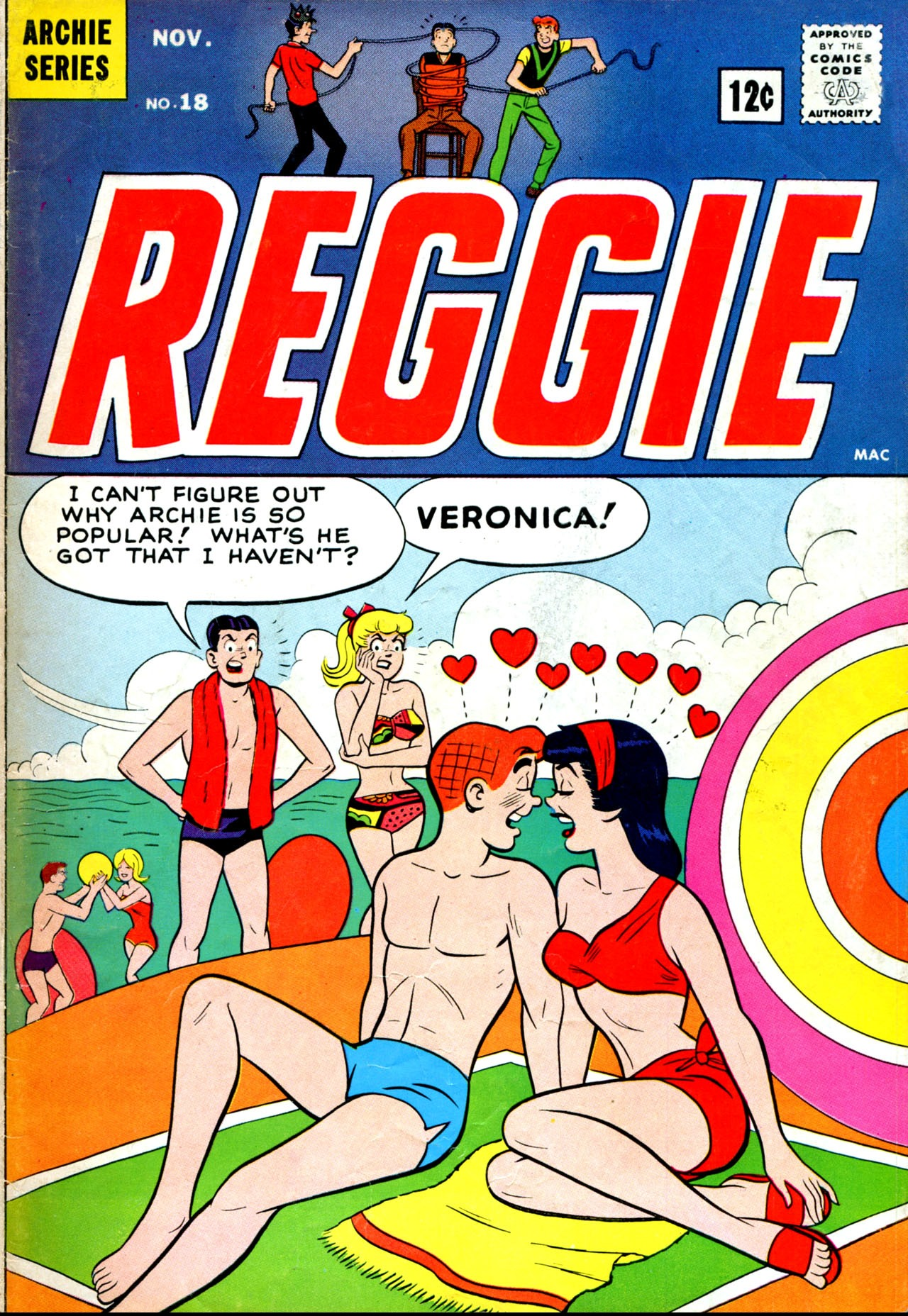
- Cover of Reggie #18 (November 1965).

Publication information
- Publisher: Archie Comics
- Schedule: Monthly
- Format: Ongoing series
- Publication date: (vol. 1); 1950 – September 1980 (vol. 2); December 2016 – May 2017
- No. of issues: (vol. 1): 126 (vol. 2): 5
- Main character(s): Reggie Mantle

Creative team
- Written by: (vol. 1); Various (vol. 2); Tom DeFalco
- Artist(s): (vol. 1); Various (vol. 2); Sandy Jarrell (#1-5)

Reggie and Me (also known as Reggie and Archie's Rival, Reggie) is an ongoing comic book series featuring the Archie Comics character Reggie Mantle. The character first appeared in Jackpot Comics #5 (cover dated Spring 1942). He received his own self-titled ongoing comic book series in 1950 which ran on and off until September 1980. A second series began publication in December 2016, being set in Archie Comics New Riverdale universe with a new character design aesthetic and a more mature story format and scripting, aimed for older, contemporary teenage and young adult readers. Even the printed comic book format is different from the previous publications.

== Publication history ==
Reggie first appeared briefly in Jackpot Comics #5 before making a full appearance in #6 (both 1942). He proved to be a perfect foil and rival to Archie Andrews and eventually was given his own series, Archie's Rival, Reggie. The series ran for 14 issues between 1950 and 1954. It was revived with the same numbering in September 1963, but the title was reduced to Reggie for issues 15 through 18. It was then changed to Reggie and Me beginning with issue 19, and retained that title through its cancellation in September 1980 at issue 126. The first issue of Archie's Rival, Reggie was reprinted, along with Reggie's first appearance (in Jackpot Comics #5 (Spring 1942)), in Archie's Pals 'n' Gals Double Digest #133.

During this publication period a second series, Reggie's Wise Guy Jokes, ran for 60 issues between August 1968 and January 1982. A three issue miniseries titled Reggie's Revenge was published quarterly in 1994 after Reggie and Me had ended.

On September 20, 2016, it was announced that a reboot of Reggie and Me would be published as part of Archie Comics' New Riverdale lineup. This was a five-issue mini-series written by Tom DeFalco with art by Sandy Jarrell. The series "promises to give readers an inside look at the most loved, revered, admired and adored teen in Riverdale".

== Volume 2 (2016-2017) ==
=== Story ===
Series writer Tom DeFalco said “Reggie Mantle has been called a self-aggrandizing egotist, a sinister super-villain, a merciless monster and worse, but his dog loves him. Sandy and I intend to show all the doubters and haters exactly why Reggie should be named the true master of this universe… or else!”
