= Geeks & Greeks =

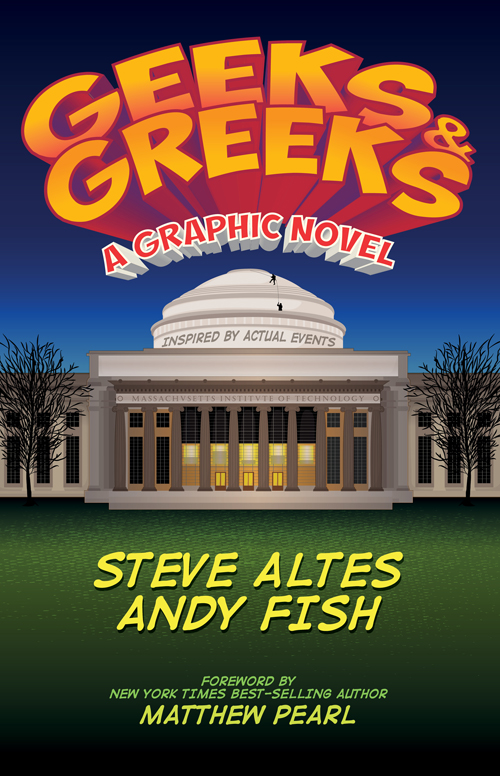
- Geeks & Greeks graphic novel cover
- Date: March, 2016
- Main characters: Jim Walden, Luke Bardolf, Dexter Garfinkel, Natalie Taylor, Prof. Neustadt
- Page count: 184 pages
- Publisher: Relentless Goat Productions

Creative team
- Writer: Steve Altes
- Penciller: Andy Fish
- Inker: Andy Fish
- Letterer: Andy Fish
- Colorists: Andy Fish, Veronica Fish
- Creators: Steve Altes, Andy Fish

Original publication
- Language: English
- ISBN: 978-0-9963504-4-0

Geeks & Greeks is a semi-autobiographical graphic novel written by humorist Steve Altes, illustrated by Andy Fish, and colored by Veronica Fish. It includes a foreword by novelist Matthew Pearl and is dedicated to Sean Collier. Geeks & Greeks is set at the Massachusetts Institute of Technology and locations in Boston, Cambridge, and the Quincy Quarries. The story was inspired by MIT's hacking culture and the writer's experiences with fraternity hazing. At MIT a hack is a clever, benign prank or unsanctioned public display or installation that requires technical sophistication to execute and often incorporates an offbeat sense of humor. Geeks & Greeks has been described as Good Will Hunting meets Animal House.

== Plot ==
Geeks & Greeks is the story of Jim Walden, a brilliant and charming young man who wants desperately to become an astronaut. Unfortunately he gets kicked out of high school for a prank. After a viral video catches the attention of MIT's admission office he is offered a scholarship to MIT.

At MIT Jim pledges Alpha Zeta Omicron (AZO), a raucous fraternity, and gets indoctrinated into MIT's hacking culture. Jim and his pledge brothers endure all manner of high-tech hazing at the hands of Luke Bardolf, a gruff AZO senior who is obsessed with pulling off the greatest hack at MIT.

Jim befriends Dexter Garfinkel (the ultimate nerd and AZO's live-in problem set slave) and begins a romance with Natalie Taylor (the Shakespeare-loving receptionist at a fertility clinic). Other characters include Professor Neustadt (who mentors Jim and helps him understand the significance and meaning of hacks) and the Bridge Troll (a homeless man who Jim aids).

When an elaborate prank goes wrong, MIT's Discipline Committee sanctions Jim and forces him to make restitution, leading Jim to Natalie's fertility clinic as a way to make money quickly. Meanwhile, Jim and Luke engage in an escalating back-and-forth prank battle, which leads to a climactic showdown at the Quincy Quarries after Luke nearly kills Dexter with his recklessness.

In the end Jim draws on his hacking prowess in a frantic race against time to prove to MIT that he deserves to be there, save his scholarship, make restitution with a bold gamble, exact revenge against Luke, win back Natalie, and inspire Dexter to revolt against his indentured servitude.

== Autobiographical and historical content ==
Elements of Geeks & Greeks were inspired by hazing incidents Altes witnessed as an MIT student as well as actual hacks, such as:

- hackers constructing a replica of a campus police car on top of MIT's Great Dome,
- hackers creating a dorm room on top of the Great Dome,
- hackers making the MIT President's office appear to vanish,
- MIT's Alpha Tau Omega fraternity commandeering the Boston Sheraton's rooftop sign to make it spell "ATO" (their initials), and
- MIT's Lambda Chi Alpha fraternity painting the smoot markers on the Harvard Bridge.

The book contains 120 endnotes citing the real-life events that influenced the graphic novel.

== Reception ==
Critical reception has been generally favorable. The Miami Herald called Geeks & Greeks a "funny, human story of struggle and redemption with believable characters in outrageous but plausible situations." Library Journal called it an "amusing romp" and said its "inventive dialog effectively juxtaposes outrageousness with hyperacademic geekery, like the 'milliHelen' measure of beauty, the insult 'nanophallus,' and a football cheer based on pi." The Post-Standard cited the "vast pool of knowledge" Altes drew on in creating a graphic novel that "sets out to entertain while also showing what the modern nerd is really like." MIT's student newspaper The Tech called it "a compelling read, filled with jokes that will please anyone with nerdier sensibilities and stories that are sure to inspire young readers to apply to the Institute," although they criticized the book for "racial and gender under-representation" among the characters. Geeks & Greeks has received positive reviews on the geek/comic culture websites FanboyNation.com, ForcesOfGeek.com, ForeverGeek.com, and ComicCrusaders.com.

== See also ==
- Campus of the Massachusetts Institute of Technology
- Hacker (term)
- Hacks at the Massachusetts Institute of Technology
- Nightwork: A History of Hacks and Pranks at MIT
- Roof and tunnel hacking
