= Veronica Fish =

American comic book artist and painter

- Born: Veronica Hebard; June 12 Boston, MA
- Areas: Cartoonist, Writer, Penciller, Artist, Inker, Letterer, Colourist
- Notable works: Archie; Silk; Geeks & Greeks

Veronica Fish is an American comic book artist and painter best known for her work with Marvel Comics and Archie Comics.

== Early life ==
Veronica Fish attended the School of Visual Arts in New York City for two years and received a BFA from the Massachusetts College of Art and Design in Boston. Her style has been described as "ultra-expressive and playful."

== Career ==
Fish teaches at the Worcester Art Museum and designed the Museum's mascot "Helmutt the Dog."

Her paintings have been exhibited in Los Angeles, Boston, New York and London.

In 2015 Fish took over regular artist duties on the rebooted Archie comic book series. She also created the initial concept art for The CW TV show Riverdale, based on the Archie comics.

In 2016 Fish was announced as the artist on Boom! Studios roller skating comic SLAM.

== Personal life ==
Fish lives in Worcester, Massachusetts and is married to fellow artist Andy Fish.

== Bibliography ==
Veronica Fish's comic and graphic novel work include:

=== Marvel Comics ===
- Spider-Woman (2015-) #10 - 17, with writer Dennis Hopeless
- Spider-Woman: Shifting Gears Vol 3: Scare Tactics trade paperback, with writer Dennis Hopeless
- Spider-Gwen Annual 2016, with writer Jason Latour
- Silk (2015-) #4 - 5, with writer (writer)
- Howard The Duck (2015-) #2, with writer Chip Zdarsky
- Unstoppable Wasp (2017) #7, with writer Jeremy Whitley

=== Archie Comics ===
- Archie, Vol. 1, by Mark Waid, Fiona Staples (illustrations), Annie Wu (illustrator), Veronica Fish (illustrator)
- Archie, Vol. 2, with writer Mark Waid
- Archie (2015-) #5 - 10, with writer Mark Waid.
- Betty & Veronica #1, Variant cover.

=== Boom! Studios ===
- Over the Garden Wall #1, Variant cover.
- Adventure Time #54, Variant cover.
- Goldie Vance #2, Variant cover.
- Clarence Quest #1, Cover
- SLAM!, with writer Pamela Ribon

=== Other publishers ===
- Geeks & Greeks graphic novel (Relentless Goat Productions, 2016), with writer Steve Altes
- Pirates of Mars, Volume 2: Gods + Monsters (2015)
- Challenger #1-3 (2014), by Kristopher Waddell
- Dracula: The Dead Travel Fast (McFarland Press, 2013)
- Pirates of Mars, Volume 1: Love + Revenge (2009)
