= Axios (website) =

American news website

- Screenshot Homepage on September 3, 2020
- Website type: News
- Available in: English
- Owner: Cox Enterprises
- Founders: Jim VandeHei; Mike Allen; Roy Schwartz
- Key people: Jim VandeHei (CEO); Mike Allen (executive editor); Roy Schwartz (president)
- Employees: 500 (2022)
- Website: www.axios.com
- Advertising: Native
- Commercial: Yes
- Launched: 2016; 10 years ago
- Current status: Active

Axios (styled ΛXIOS in the logo) is an American news website based in Arlington, Virginia. It was founded in 2016 and launched the following year by former Politico journalists Jim VandeHei, Mike Allen, and Roy Schwartz. The site's name is based on the Ancient Greek ἄξιος (áxios, lit. 'worthy').

Axios articles are often brief to facilitate quick reading; most are shorter than 300 words and use bullet points. In addition to news articles, Axios produces daily and weekly industry-specific newsletters (including Allen's Axios AM, a successor to his newsletter Politico Playbook for Politico).

In September 2022, Cox Enterprises completed its acquisition of Axios for $525 million.

== History ==
VandeHei said he wanted Axios to be a "mix between The Economist and Twitter", which attracted criticism. The company initially covered a mix of business, politics, technology, health care, and media. VandeHei said Axios would focus on the "collision between tech and areas such as bureaucracy, healthcare, energy, and the transportation infrastructure". At its launch, Nicholas Johnston, a former managing editor at Bloomberg L.P., was named its editor-in-chief.

In 2016, Axios secured $10 million in a round of financing led by Lerer Hippeau Ventures. Backers include media-partner NBC News, Laurene Powell Jobs's Emerson Collective, Greycroft Partners, and David and Katherine Bradley, owners of Atlantic Media. The company had raised $30 million as of November 2017. It planned to focus on "business, technology, politics, and media trends". Axios generates revenue through short-form native advertising and sponsored newsletters. It earned more than $10 million in revenue in its first seven months.

In January 2017, Axios hired as an executive vice president Evan Ryan, the Assistant Secretary of State for Educational and Cultural Affairs and a former staffer for Vice President Joe Biden. Axios had 6 million unique visitors in September 2017, according to Comscore. As of November 2017, Axios reported it had 200,000 subscribers to 11 newsletters, with an average open rate of 52 percent. The same month, it said it would use a new $20 million investment to expand data analysis, product development, fund audience growth, and increase staff to 150, up from 89.

In March and April 2019, HuffPost and Wired reported that Axios had paid a firm to improve its reputation by lobbying for changes to the Wikipedia articles on Axios and Jonathan Swan.

In July 2020, under the first presidency of Donald Trump, Axios received $4.8 million in federal loans from the Paycheck Protection Program for salary replacement during the COVID-19 pandemic. It later returned the money, with VandeHei explaining that the loans had become "politically polarizing". In September 2020, The Wall Street Journal reported that Axios was on track to be profitable in 2020 "despite the economic turmoil stemming from the coronavirus that led to broad layoffs and pay cuts at many media outlets".

In May 2021, The Wall Street Journal reported that merger discussions between Axios and The Athletic had ended, with The Athletic opting to pursue a deal with The New York Times.

On August 8, 2022, Axios announced that it had been sold to Cox Enterprises for $525 million. As part of the transaction, Axios spun out Axios HQ as a separate software company. According to the deal, Cox owns 70% of the company, while Axios employees and its founders retain ownership of the remaining 30%. The acquisition was completed the following month.

Since 2021, Axios has launched a network of local newsletters across the United States. The company has also focused on growing its events business.

In March 2023, Axios fired Ben Montgomery, a Pulitzer Prize finalist, after he described as "propaganda" a Florida Department of Education press release about an event hosted by Governor Ron DeSantis "exposing the diversity, equity and inclusion scam in higher education".

In August 2024, Axios laid off 50 employees, which amounted to 10 percent of its total staff.

== Content ==
Axios content is designed for digital platforms, such as Facebook and Snapchat, as well as its own website. Its articles are typically less than 300 words long, as most Axios content is geared for quick, concise reads. In addition to its website, Axios content is distributed via newsletters covering politics, technology, healthcare, and other subjects. Among the newsletters is a daily report by co-founder Mike Allen, who formerly wrote Politico's Playbook newsletter. Some Axios newsletters are free, while others are paid. The company sells a subscription service called Axios Pro that bundles several paid newsletters, starting at $599 per year.

Axios reporters have made television appearances on NBC News and MSNBC under an agreement with NBC, secured in 2017. Its NBC Universal partnership has featured Allen on MSNBC's show Morning Joe.

In 2021, the documentary series Axios on HBO won the News and Documentary Emmy Award for Outstanding Interview for the interview with President Donald Trump conducted by Jonathan Swan.

In May 2026, a report by Press Gazette revealed that Axios had cut content output by 22% in the first quarter of the year, while traffic increased 30%, signaling a change in editorial approach.

== See also ==
- FiveThirtyEight
- RealClearPolitics
