= Jim VandeHei =

American journalist and businessman (born 1971)

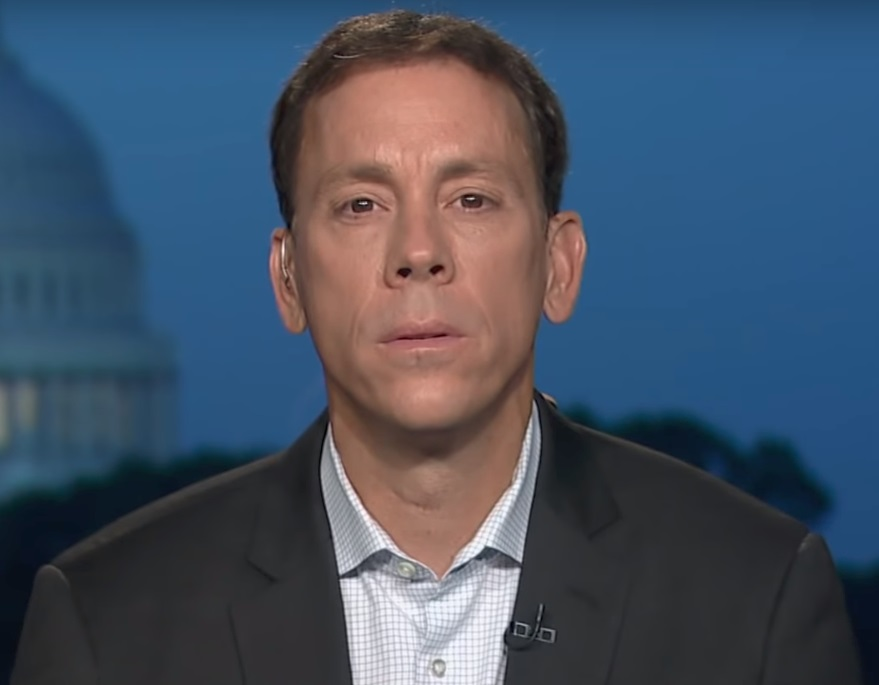
- VandeHei on MSNBC's Morning Joe in 2018
- Born: James VandeHei; Oshkosh, Wisconsin, U.S.
- Education: University of Wisconsin–Oshkosh (BA)
- Occupations: Editor, reporter
- Spouse: Autumn Hanna VandeHei
- Children: 3

James VandeHei is an American journalist and businessman. He is the co-founder and CEO of Axios, and the former executive editor and co-founder of Politico. Previously, he was a national political reporter at The Washington Post, where he worked as a White House correspondent.

== Early life and education ==
VandeHei was born in Oshkosh, Wisconsin and graduated from Lourdes Academy in 1989. In 1995, he graduated from the University of Wisconsin–Oshkosh with a double major in journalism and political science. As an undergraduate, he interned at The Brillion News in Brillion, Wisconsin during the summer of 1993. He later interned in the office of Democratic Senator Herb Kohl in 1994, which led to his decision to become a political journalist.

== Career ==
After working as a sports reporter for the Oshkosh Northwestern, VandeHei moved to Washington, D.C. In 1995, began working for Inside Washington Publishers. In 1996, he was hired by "Inside the New Congress," a weekly newsletter focusing on the House and Senate. In 1997, he began working as a reporter for Roll Call, which covers Capitol Hill. While at Roll Call, VandeHei broke the story of House Speaker-elect Bob Livingston's affairs in 1998. He was one of the first to report in 1998 that Republicans were formally planning to impeach Bill Clinton.

After a stint as a national political reporter for The Wall Street Journal in 2000, VandeHei joined The Washington Post. VandeHei's work has appeared in Capital Style and The New Republic. He has appeared as a pundit on television shows on all the major networks.

In 2006, VandeHei left The Washington Post to co-found a political publication, Politico.

In early 2016, it was announced that VandeHei was leaving Politico after the presidential election. In April, he abruptly left prior to his previously stated departure date and penned a piece in The Information about the current vapid state of media, the downward spiral of chasing clicks and the media's future. That same year, he co-founded Axios.

== Awards ==
In November 2024, VandeHei delivered a spirited defense of free and fearless journalism at the National Press Club's Fourth Estate Awards ceremony. Accepting the Lifetime Achievement award alongside co-founder Mike Allen, VandeHei emphasized the importance of a robust and independent press.

"The notion that we don't need the media is simply false," VandeHei asserted. "I love this country. It's a place where someone from Wisconsin can start two companies and be honored with an award like this. But at the core of this opportunity is transparency, a free press, and the ability to report without fear or favor."

VandeHei highlighted journalists' challenges: "Being a great reporter is incredibly difficult. It requires daily dedication to uncovering the truth, without succumbing to fear or bias. This isn't achieved through social media posts or personal opinions, but through rigorous, investigative journalism."

== Personal life ==
VandeHei is married to Autumn Hanna VandeHei, a former staffer for House Republican Leader Tom DeLay of Texas who served as Deputy Assistant Secretary for Legislation (Human Services) in the Presidency of George W. Bush. She was an executive producer of I Am Jane Doe, a film on sex trafficking.

Jim and Autumn have three children and reside in Alexandria, Virginia. VandeHei has ankylosing spondylitis, a rare spinal condition.
