= Granite Railway =

Railroad between Quincy and Milton, Massachusetts

Quincy Granite Railway

Commercial operations
- Original gauge: 5 ft (1,524 mm)

Preserved operations
- Preserved gauge: 5 ft (1,524 mm)

- Quincy Granite Railway Incline
- U.S. National Register of Historic Places
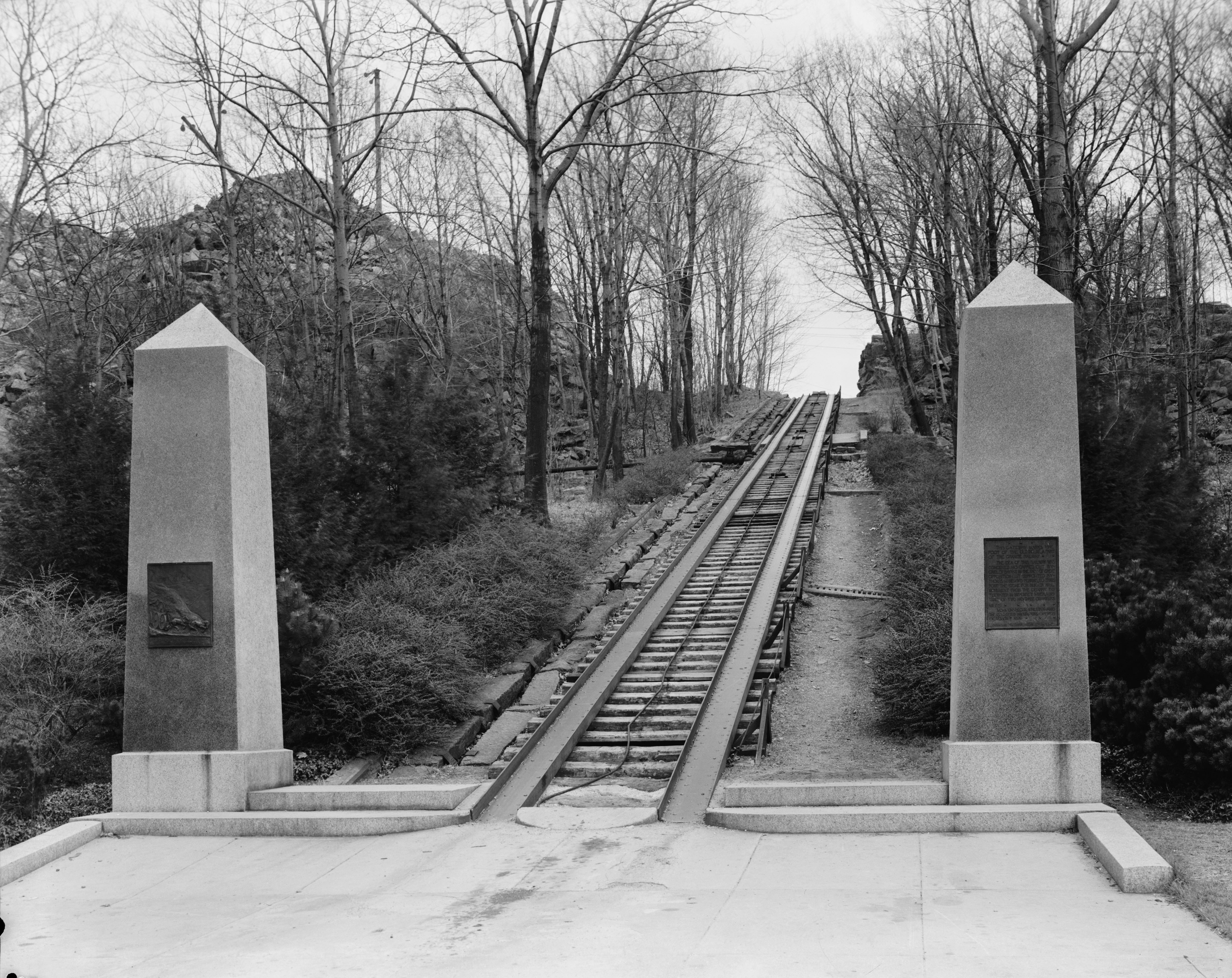
- The Incline section of the Granite Railway; Quincy (1934 photo)

- Location within Massachusetts Location within the United States
- Location: Mullin Ave., Quincy, Massachusetts
- Coordinates: 42°14′43″N 71°2′14″W
- Area: 0.2 acres (0.08 ha)
- Built: 1826
- NRHP reference No.: 73000310
- Quincy Granite Railway
- U.S. National Register of Historic Places
- Location: Bunker Hill Lane, Quincy, Massachusetts
- Coordinates: 42°14′23″N 71°1′57″W
- Area: 0.7 acres (0.3 ha)
- Built: 1826
- NRHP reference No.: 73000309
- Added to NRHP: October 15, 1973
- Added to NRHP: June 19, 1973

The Granite Railway was one of the first railroads in the United States, built to carry granite from Quincy, Massachusetts, to a dock on the Neponset River in Milton. From there boats carried the heavy stone to Charlestown for construction of the Bunker Hill Monument. The Granite Railway is popularly termed the first commercial railroad in the United States, as it was the first chartered railway to evolve into a common carrier without an intervening closure. The last active quarry closed in 1963; in 1985, the Metropolitan District Commission purchased 22 acres (8.9 ha), including Granite Railway Quarry, as the Quincy Quarries Reservation.

== History ==
In 1825, after an exhaustive search throughout New England, Solomon Willard selected the Quincy site as the source of stone for the proposed Bunker Hill Monument. After many delays and much obstruction, the railway itself was granted a charter on March 4, 1826, with right of eminent domain to establish its right-of-way. Businessman and state legislator Thomas Handasyd Perkins organized the financing of the new Granite Railway Company, owning a majority of its shares, and he was designated its president. The railroad was designed and built by railway pioneer Gridley Bryant and began operations on October 7, 1826. Bryant used developments that had already been in use on the railroads in England, but he modified his design to allow for heavier, more concentrated loads and a three-foot (0.91 m) frost line.

The railway ran three miles (4.8 km) from quarries to the Neponset River. Its wagons had wheels 6 ft (1.83 m) in diameter and were pulled by horses, although steam locomotives had been in operation in England for 13 years. The wooden rails were plated with iron and were laid 5 ft (1,524 mm) apart, on stone crossties spaced at 8-foot (2.4 m) intervals. By 1837, these wooden rails had been replaced by granite rails, once again capped with iron.

In 1830, a new section of the railway, called the "Incline", was added to haul granite from the Pine Ledge Quarry to the railway level 84 ft (26 m) below. Wagons moved up and down the 315-foot (96 m) long incline in an endless conveyor belt. The incline continued in operation until the 1940s.

The railway introduced several important inventions, including railway switches or frogs, the turntable, and double-truck railroad cars. Gridley Bryant never patented his inventions, believing they should be for the benefit of all.

The novelty of the new railroad attracted tourists who journeyed out from Boston to witness the revolutionary technology in person. Notable visitors such as statesman Daniel Webster and English actress Fanny Kemble were early witnesses to the new railway. Miss Kemble described her 1833 visit in her journal.

On July 25, 1832, the Granite Railway was the site of one of the first fatal railway accidents in the United States, when the wagon containing Thomas B. Achuas of Cuba derailed as he and three other tourists were taking a tour. The accident occurred while the wagon, empty of stone but now carrying the four passengers, was ascending the Incline on its return trip and a cable broke. The occupants of the car were thrown over a cliff, approximately 35 ft (11 m). Achuas was killed and the three other passengers were badly injured.

In 1871, the Old Colony and Newport Railway took over the original right-of-way of the Granite Railway, replacing its track with contemporary construction, and steam trains then took granite from the quarries directly to Boston without need of barges from the Neponset River. This portion of the Old Colony Railroad through Quincy and Milton was later absorbed into the New York, New Haven and Hartford Railroad. During the early 20th century, metal channels were laid over the old granite rails on the Incline, and motor trucks were hauled up and down on a cable. Passenger service on the Granite Branch (West Quincy Branch) ended on September 30, 1940; freight service was abandoned in stages from 1941 to 1973.

Most of the right of way of the railway was eventually incorporated into much of the Southeast Expressway in Milton and Quincy.

== Gridley Bryant's recollection ==
In an 1859 letter to Charles B. Stuart, Bryant wrote:

The Quincy Railway was commenced under the following circumstances: The 'Bunker Hill Monument Association' had been formed, and funds enough collected to commence the foundation of the monument in the spring of eighteen hundred and twenty-five. I aided the architect in preparing the foundation, and on the seventeenth day of June following, the corner-stone was laid by General de La Fayette, and I had the honor to assist as master builder at the ceremony. I had, previous to this, purchased a stone quarry (the funds being furnished by Dr. John C. Warren) for the express purpose of procuring the granite for constructing this monument. This quarry was in Quincy, nearly four miles from water-carriage. This suggested to me the idea of a railroad (the Manchester and Liverpool Railroad being in contemplation at that time, but was not begun until the spring following); accordingly, in the fall of eighteen hundred and twenty-five, I consulted Thomas H. Perkins, William Sullivan, Amos Lawrence, Isaac T. Davis, and David Moody, all of Boston, in reference to it. These gentlemen thought the project visionary and chimerical, but, being anxious to aid the Bunker Hill Monument, consented that I might see what could be done. I awaited the meeting of our Legislature in the winter of eighteen hundred and twenty-five and six, and after every delay and obstruction that could be thrown in the way, I finally obtained a charter, although there was great opposition in the House. The questions were asked: 'What do we know about rail-roads? Who ever heard of such a thing? Is it right to take people's land for a project that no one knows anything about? We have corporations enough already.' Such and similar objections were made, and onerous restrictions were imposed, but it finally passed by a small majority only. Unfavorable as the charter was, it was admitted that it was obtained by my exertions; but it was owing to the munificence and public spirit of Colonel T. H. Perkins that we were indebted for the whole enterprise. None of the first named gentlemen ever paid any assessments, and the whole stock finally fell into the hands of Colonel Perkins.

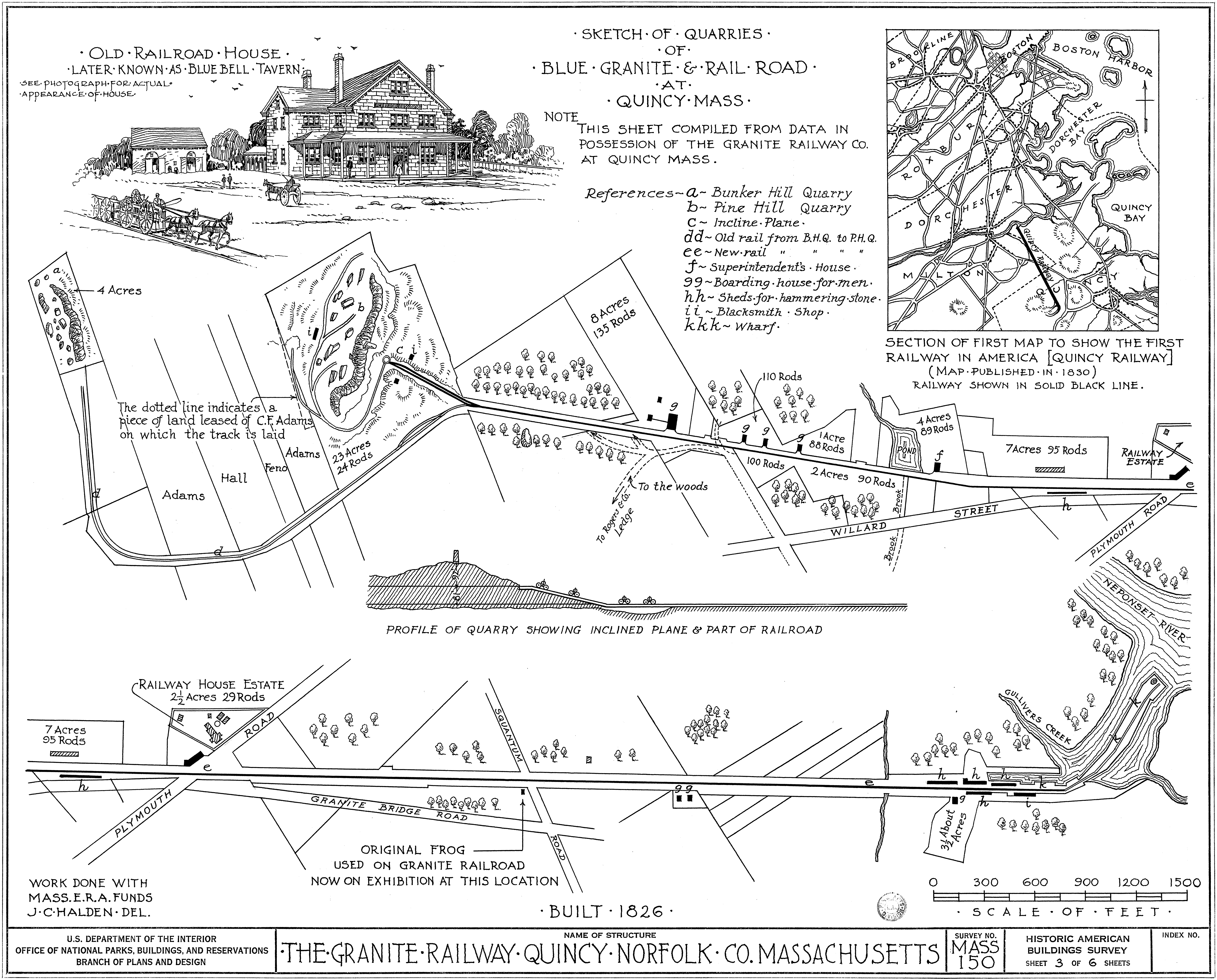
The Granite Railway

The Quincy Railroad is four miles long, including the branches. I surveyed several routes from the quarry purchased (called the Bunker Hill Quarry), to the nearest tide-water; and finally the present location was decided upon. I commenced the work on the first day of April, eighteen hundred and twenty-six, and on the seventh day of October following the first train of cars passed over the whole length of the road.

The deepest cutting was fifteen feet, and the highest elevation above the surface of the ground was twelve feet. The several grades were as follows: The first, commencing at the wharf or landing, was twenty-six feet to the mile, the second thirteen feet, and the third sixty-six feet. This brought us to the foot of the table-lands that ran around the main quarry; here an elevation of eighty-four feet vertical was to be overcome. This was done by an inclined plane, three hundred and fifteen feet long, at an angle of about fifteen degrees. It had an endless chain, to which the cars were attached in ascending or descending; at the head of this inclined plane I constructed a swing platform to receive the loaded cars as they came from the quarry. This platform was balanced by weights, and had gearing attached to it in such a manner that it would always return (after having dumped) to a horizontal position, being firmly supported on the periphery of an eccentric cam. When the cars were out on the platform there was danger of their running entirely over, and I constructed a self-acting guard, that would rise above the surface of the rail upon the platform as it rose from its connection with the inclined plain, or receded out of the way when the loaded car passed on to the track; the weight of the car depressing the platform as it was lowered down.

I also constructed a turn-table at the foot of the quarry, which is still in use as originally constructed. The railroad was continued at different grades around the quarry, the highest part of which was ninety-three feet above the general level; on the top of this was erected an obelisk or monument forty-five feet high.

The road was constructed in the following manner: Stone sleepers were laid across the track eight feet apart. Upon these, wooden rails, six inches thick and twelve inches high, were placed. Upon the top of these rails, iron plates, three inches wide and one-fourth of an inch thick, were fastened with spikes; but at all the crossings of public roads and drift-ways stone rails were used instead of wood. On the top of these were placed iron plates four inches wide and half an inch thick, being firmly bolted to the stone. The inclined plane was built in the same permanent manner and had a double track.

The first cost of the road was fifty thousand dollars, and that of the first car six hundred dollars. This car had high wheels, six and one-half feet in diameter, the load being suspended on a platform by chains under the axles. This platform was let down at any convenient place and loaded; the car was then run over the load, and the chains attached to it by being inserted in eye-bolts in the platform, and raised a little above the track by machinery on the top of the car. The loads averaged about six tons each. The next car was. made with low wheels, with a strong massive frame. The gauge of the road being five feet, the axles were placed that distance apart, this being the true principle on which to construct railroad trucks, and has been adopted generally in this country.

When stones of eight or ten tons weight were to be transported, I took two of these trucks and attached them together by a platform and king bolts. This made an eight-wheeled car; and when larger stones were to be carried, I increased the number of trucks, and this made a sixteen-wheeled car....

== Preservation ==
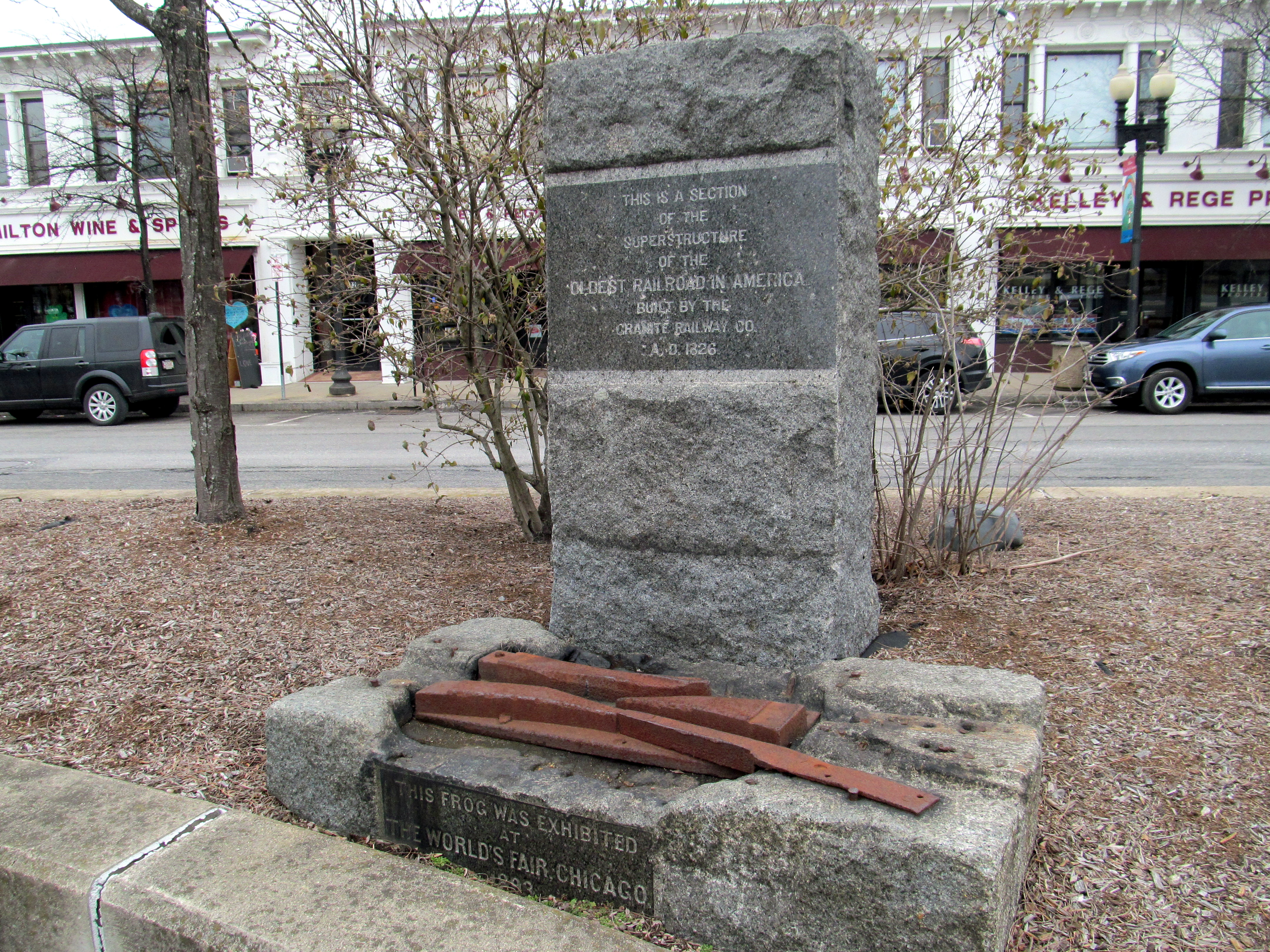
Granite Railway memorial in East Milton Square

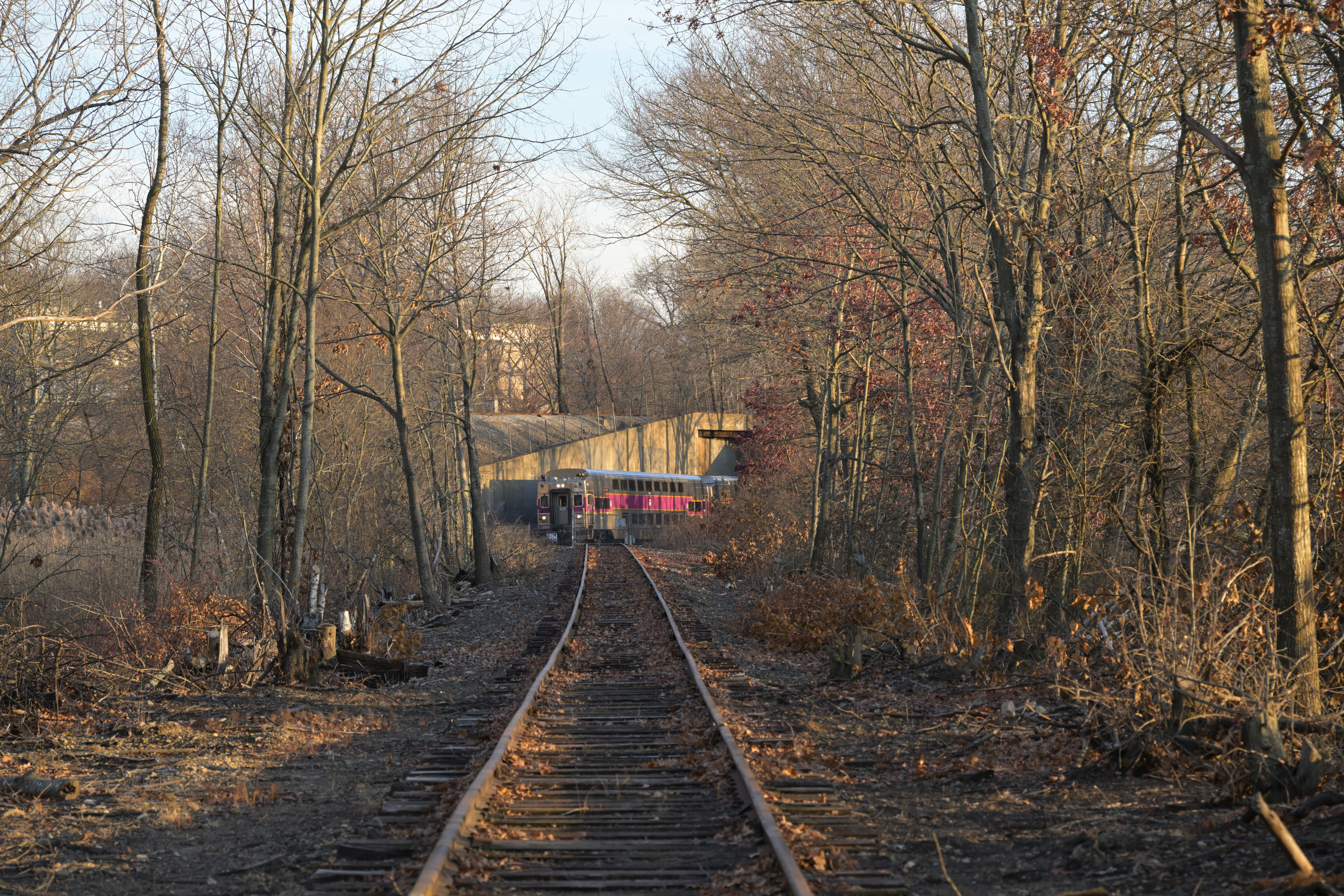
The remnants of the very southern end of the West Quincy Branch, where it branched off the Old Colony Mainline. These tracks are the last remnants of the line

The railway's Incline was added to the National Register of Historic Places on June 19, 1973, and a surviving portion of the railroad bed, just off the end of Bunker Hill Lane, was added on October 15, 1973. The Granite Railway was designated as a National Historic Civil Engineering Landmark by the American Society of Civil Engineers in 1976.

A centennial historic plaque from 1926, an original switch frog, a piece of train track, and a section of superstructure from the Granite Railway are in the gardens on top of the Southeast Expressway (Interstate 93) as it passes under East Milton Square. The frog had been displayed at the World's Columbian Exposition at Chicago in 1893. The commemorative display is at the approximate site of the railroad's right-of-way as it went through Milton on its way to the Neponset River.

In Quincy, visitors can walk along several parkland trails that reveal vestiges of the original railway trestle and the Incline. These trails connect to the quarries, most of which are now filled for safety purposes with dirt from the massive Big Dig highway project in Boston. In years past, many persons were injured – and some killed – while diving into the flooded abandoned quarries from great heights.

The Department of Conservation and Recreation maintains the Quincy Quarries Reservation, which has facilities for rock climbing, and trails connecting the remains of the Granite Railway.

== Gallery ==
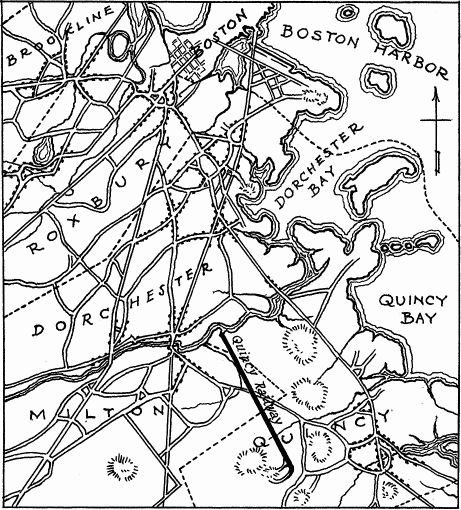
Map of the Granite Railway

A three-car, horse-drawn train on the Granite Railway at East Milton Square c1855 (another source says c1840).

The switch frog of the Granite Railway that was displayed at the Chicago World's Fair in 1893.

== See also ==
- Iron rails
- Mine railway
- National Register of Historic Places listings in Quincy, Massachusetts
- Oldest railroads in North America
