= Capital Style =

Capital Style magazine was a Washington, DC political lifestyle magazine in publication from October 1997 to May 2000. Its editor was Bill Thomas. Capital Style was launched by The Economist Group. The Capital Style feature that received the most attention was "Bill Clinton Hit on My Wife" by humorist Steve Altes.
