= Steve Altes =

American writer and aerospace engineer (born 1962)

- Born: November 13, 1962 (age 63); Syracuse, New York
- Education: Massachusetts Institute of Technology
- Occupations: Writer; graphic novelist; engineer
- Known for: humorous adventure essays, Geeks & Greeks
- Spouse: Diana Jellinek
- Awards: National Medal of Technology
- Website: stevealtes.wixsite.com/stevealtes

Steve Altes (born November 13, 1962) is an American writer and former aerospace engineer. He writes humorous essays about his misadventures.

== Early life ==
Altes was born on November 13, 1962, in Syracuse, New York. He graduated from Fayetteville-Manlius High School in Manlius in 1980. In high school, Altes once ran a track meet in clown make-up. In 2000, when Altes was inducted into the Fayetteville-Manlius Hall of Distinction as one of the high school's "notable alumni", he acknowledged the dichotomy in his career segue from engineering to entertainment, saying, "I owe a tremendous debt to those dedicated teachers for the serious half of my career. For the silly half, I’d like to thank all the class clowns."

== Engineering ==
Altes holds three degrees from the Massachusetts Institute of Technology (MIT): S.B., Aeronautics and Astronautics, 1984; S.M., Aeronautics and Astronautics, 1986; and S.M., Technology and Policy, 1986.

In 1982, Altes was part of the MIT team that set a world land-speed record for a human-powered vehicle using a five-person, forty-foot-long "bicycle". His master's thesis, "The Aerospace Plane: Technological Feasibility and Policy Implications", was reviewed by James Fallows in The New York Review of Books in 1986.

After college, Altes worked as a space policy analyst for the Congressional Office of Technology Assessment. He left Congress for a position as program control manager for the Pegasus air-launched space booster at Orbital Sciences Corporation. In 1991, Altes was part of the Orbital Sciences team that was awarded the National Medal of Technology (the United States' highest award for technological achievement) by President George H. W. Bush for developing Pegasus. He is a co-recipient of the 1990 Smithsonian National Air and Space Museum Trophy for Current Achievement in Aerospace.

Due to his varied endeavors in the fields of engineering and entertainment, Altes is sometimes listed as one of MIT's more "notable alumni".

== Entertainment ==
In the mid-1990s, Altes left engineering for a career in entertainment and writing.

=== Essays ===
Altes has written a series of first-person participatory adventure essays about experiences such as:

- becoming an ordained minister of the Universal Life Church
- working as a hand model
- standing in for Brad Pitt on the movie The Devil's Own
- being chosen to model for the Just for Men hair color box
- having his first book published
- working as a "bank robber" at the FBI training academy
- answering phones in the Arkansas Governor's Mansion for President-elect Bill Clinton
- and being hired and fired by the CIA in one day.

These essays have appeared in magazines and newspapers like Salon, The Washington Post, the Los Angeles Times, The Christian Science Monitor, Capital Style, The Writer, Urban Male Magazine, Funny Times and P.O.V.

=== Books ===
In 1997, Altes's The Little Book of Bad Business Advice was published by St. Martin's Press.

In 2001, a sequel, If You Jam the Copier, Bolt was published by Andrews McMeel Publishing.

In 2005, Altes was a contributor to Michael J. Rosen's anthology, May Contain Nuts: A Very Loose Canon of American Humor. His piece satirized his career as a male model.

In 2006, the humor editor Judy Brown selected twenty of Altes's jokes to appear in her anthology Joke Express: Instant Delivery of 1,424 Funny Bits from the Best Comedians.

In 2014, Altes ran a Kickstarter campaign which raised $43,098 to finance the illustration of a graphic novel he had written about hacks at MIT, titled Geeks & Greeks. The graphic novel was illustrated by Andy Fish and was published in 2016 to generally positive reviews.

=== Film appearances ===
Altes has appeared in a number of films and television shows after being accidentally "discovered" and cast as a German terrorist in Die Hard With a Vengeance in 1995.

Year	Film	Role
1995	Die Hard With a Vengeance	German terrorist
1997	Shadow Conspiracy	Secret Service agent
1999	Girl, Interrupted	Medic
2000	Hollow Man	Dad

=== Print modeling ===
Altes has worked as a commercial print model and hand model.

=== Other ===
Altes has also been:

- a screenwriter
- a commentator for NPR's All Things Considered
- a member of Us Weekly's Fashion Police

== Awards ==
- 1991 - National Medal of Technology (co-recipient)
- 1990 - National Air and Space Museum Trophy for Current Achievement in Aerospace (co-recipient)

== Personal ==
Altes lives in the Los Angeles area and is married to Diana Jellinek, an acting coach.
