= Erica Henderson =

American comics artist and animator

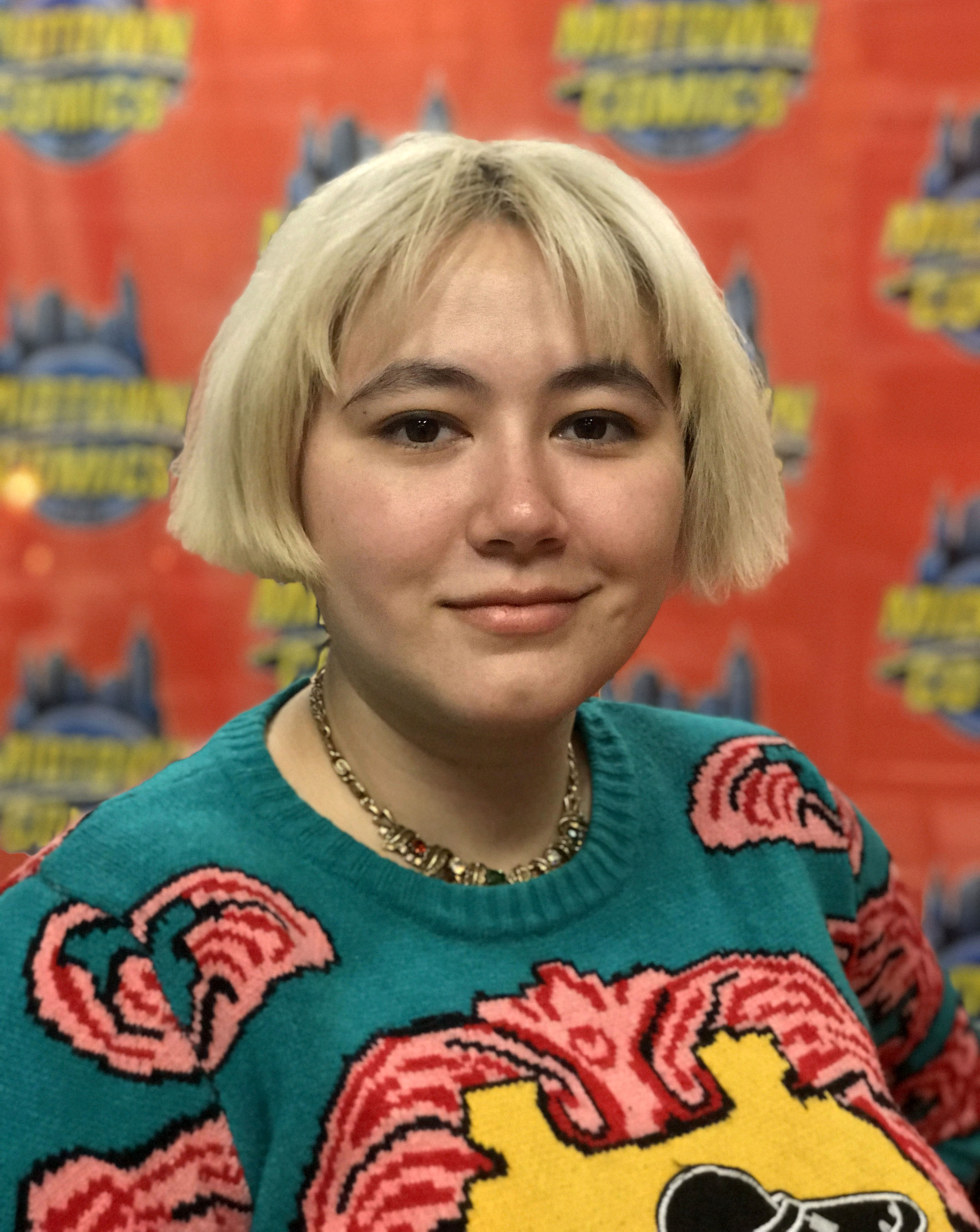
- Henderson at Midtown Comics in Manhattan
- Born: New York City
- Areas: Penciller, Inker, Colourist
- Notable works: The Unbeatable Squirrel Girl; Jughead

Erica Henderson is an American three-time Eisner Award-winning comics artist and animator, known for her work on The Unbeatable Squirrel Girl and Jughead, and for her animation work on The Venture Bros.

== Early life ==
Henderson was born in New York. Her mother works in the fashion industry, and her father is the late horror and detective fiction author C. J. Henderson, who exposed her to comics and adult science fiction from a young age. She was a fan of Archie Comics, and names Dan DeCarlo and Samm Schwartz among her earliest influences for their distinctive styles. She was also a fan of the DC Comics series Young Heroes in Love, which showed her how superheroes could be adapted into different genres and story types.

Henderson graduated from Rhode Island School of Design.

== Career ==
During the break between her junior and sophomore year in college, Henderson worked as an intern for World Leaders Entertainment, where she worked on the third season of the animated television series The Venture Bros. She began her work on that program doing storyboards for animatics, which involved preparing backgrounds by converting background artist Denny Finkel's line drawings into Flash animation so that they could then be sent to Korea to be painted. It was her first time using a Cintiq drawing tablet. That season would later premiere in June 2008.

The following year, during the break between her sophomore and junior year, Henderson worked on the live-action film Underdog, which was released in 2007. Henderson contributed guest comics to Sluggy Freelance in 2007 and 2008.

Henderson later worked as an art director in the video game industry.

Henderson illustrated Marvel Comics' Squirrel Girl for its first 37 issues before leaving the series in March 2018, although she continued to illustrate the series' covers. Graeme Virtue of The Guardian praised her artwork on the series, describing it as "gorgeous" and better than the other contents produced by Marvel at the time.

Henderson reunited with Squirrel Girl writer Ryan North to create a YA graphic novel titled Danger and Other Unknown Risks. This graphic novel was described as a "dystopian fantasy" and was published in April 2023 by Penguin Teen.

Since 2025, Henderson has been writing a new series titled Harley and Ivy: Life and Crimes, telling the beginning of the romantic relationship between the titular characters, Harley Quinn (Harleen Quinzel) and Poison Ivy (Pamela Lilian Isley). Batman: The Animated Series (1992–1995), which she grew up watching, is one of her inspirations for this project. Landon Kuhlmann of AIPT Comics complimented it as a lighthearted but intimate romantic story with "stunning" artworks and good structural design (including font choices).

== Technique and materials ==
Henderson draws using both traditional and digital techniques. She begins drawing a page by doing quick thumbnail drawings in a sketchbook before doing the pencils digitally in a computer, which she says makes the process faster. Although there are some things she can render more quickly with a pencil, the ability to make quick alterations digitally outweighs that minor advantage. She draws on a Fujitsu Lightbook laptop computer, which has Cintiq technology built into it. She uses the digital drawing program Paint Tool SAI, which she appreciates for its line feel, and for its easier, pared-down structure compared to Photoshop, which she uses to print out art in blue line. She then inks over the blue line, and imports it back into Photoshop to color it, because SAI only provides RGB color, and not the CMYK color that is needed for comics work. When working on Squirrel Girl, Henderson employed a template different from the ones she uses for other books, which had extra space at the bottom for text.

== Awards ==
Year	Award	Category	Work	Co-creators	Result	Ref.
2017	Eisner Awards	Best Publication for Teens (ages 13-17)	The Unbeatable Squirrel Girl	Ryan North	Won	
2017	Eisner Awards	Best Humor Publication	Jughead	Chip Zdarsky, Ryan North, Derek Charm	Won	
2024	Eisner Awards	Best Publication for Teens (ages 13-17)	Danger and Other Unknown Risks	Ryan North	Won	

== Personal life ==
Henderson lives in Somerville, Massachusetts.
