= Jughead (comic book) =

Comic book series (1949 – 2017)

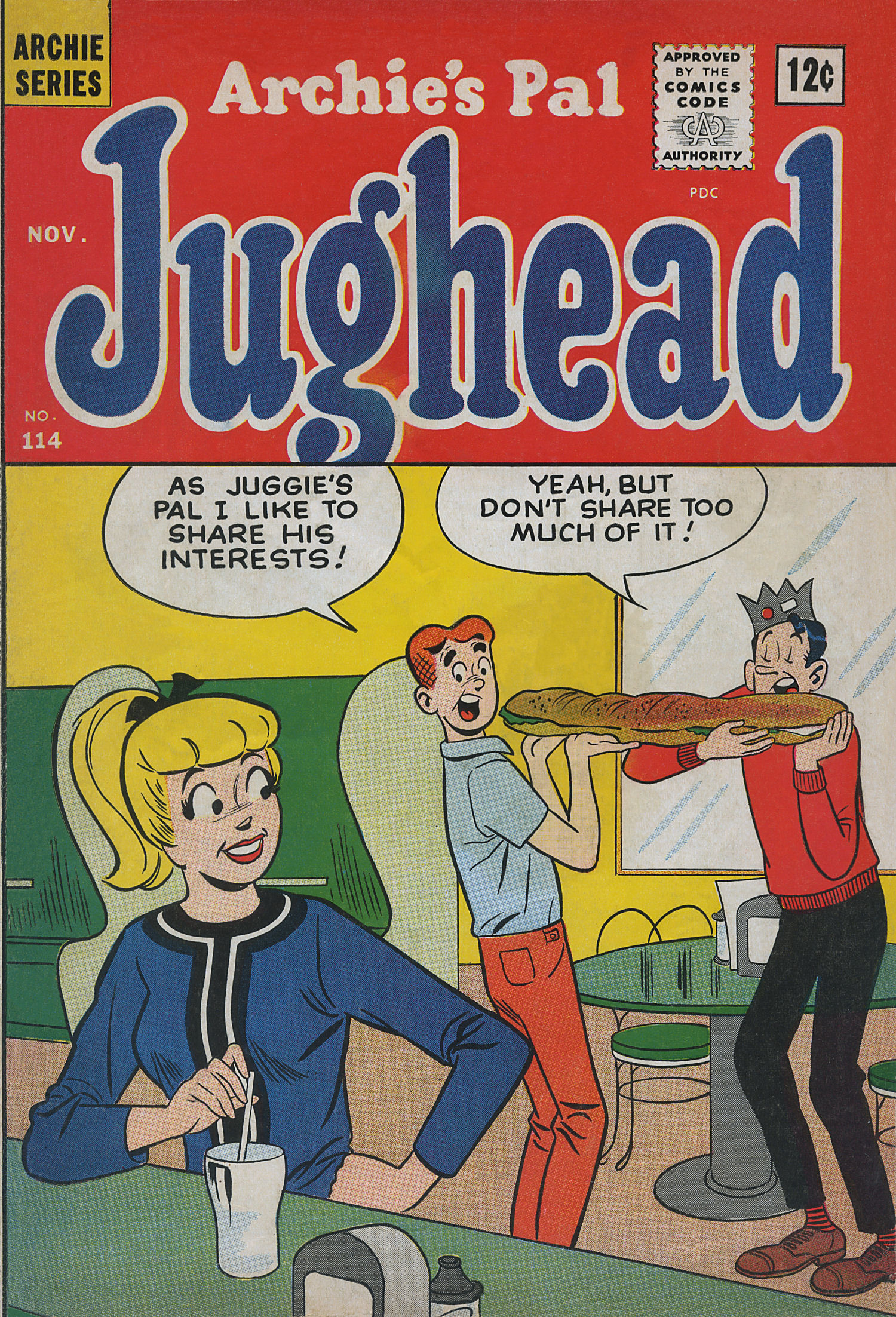
- Cover of Archie's Pal Jughead #114 (November 1964)

Publication information
- Publisher: Archie Comics
- Schedule: (vol. 1-2); Bimonthly (vol. 3); Monthly
- Format: Ongoing series
- Publication date: (vol. 1); January 1949 – June 1987 (vol. 2); August 1987 - September 2012 (vol. 3); October 2015 - June 2017
- No. of issues: (vol. 1); 352 (vol. 2); 214 (vol. 3); 16
- Main character: Jughead Jones

Creative team
- Written by: Various (vol. 1-2); Chip Zdarsky (vol. 3 #1-8); Ryan North (vol. 3 #9-14); Mark Waid (vol. 3 #15-16); Ian Flynn (vol. 3 #15-16)
- Artist(s): Various (vol. 1-2); Erica Henderson (vol. 3 #1-6); Derek Charm (vol. 3 #7-16)

Jughead (also known as Archie's Pal Jughead) is an ongoing comic book series featuring the Archie Comics character of the same name. The character first appeared in Pep Comics #22 (cover dated December 1941). Jughead proved to be popular enough to warrant his own self-titled ongoing comic book series which began publication in January 1949.

== Publication history ==
Jughead first appeared in Pep Comics #22 in 1941 (also Archie's first appearance) and later grew into his own title Archie's Pal Jughead Comics in 1949, which also guest-starred Archie and his friends. Common story themes included Jughead's insatiable appetite for hamburgers, avoiding Big Ethel who has a crush on him and outsmarting his nemesis Reggie Mantle.

The cover title was shortened to Jughead with #122 in July 1965, though the indicia continued to list Archie's Pal Jughead until also changing in November's #126. In #325, Cheryl Blossom made her second appearance after debuting in Archie's Girls Betty and Veronica that same month. The original Jughead series ended with #352 (June 1987).

Jughead returned with a relaunched #1 in August 1987. With #46 (June 1993), the series was renamed Archie's Pal Jughead Comics, echoing the previous volume. In the same issue Jughead finds out that his mother is expecting a baby, and in #50, the baby girl, nicknamed "Jellybean" is born. The second volume ended in 2012 with issue #214.

A third series, titled Jughead, was released in October 2015 as part of Archie Comics' New Riverdale. It is written by Chip Zdarsky with artwork by Erica Henderson. Derek Charm took over as regular artist starting with issue #7.

=== First appearances ===
Appearance	Volume/Issue Number	Month/Year
Moose Mason as Moose McGee	(vol. 1) #1	January 1949
Midge Klump	(vol. 1) #5	April 1951
Ethel Muggs	(vol. 1) #84	May 1962
Forsythia "Jellybean" Jones	(vol. 2) #50	November 1993
Trula Twyst	(vol. 2) #89	February 1997

== Collected Editions ==
Volume 1

Title	Issues Collected	Publication Date
Archie's Pal Jughead Archives vol. 1	#1-8	March 25, 2015
Archie's Pal Jughead Archives vol. 2	#9-16	June 15, 2016

Volume 3

Title	Issues Collected	Publication Date
Jughead vol. 1	#1-6	28 July 2016
Jughead vol. 2	#7-11	16 March 2017
Jughead vol. 3	#12-16	16 November 2017
