= Andy Fish =

American artist (1965–2026)

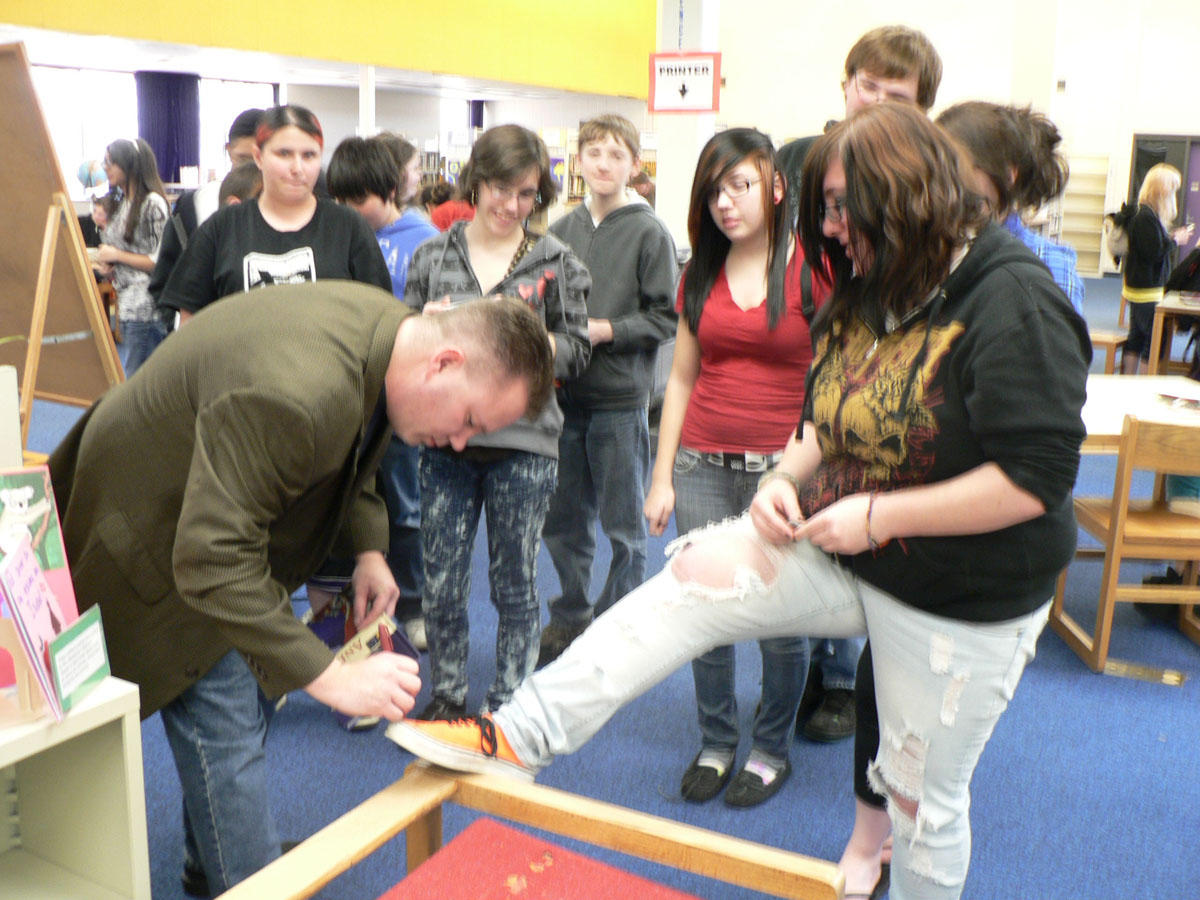
Graphic novelist Andy Fish signs autographs for fans.

Andrew Tiberius Fish (December 27, 1965 – September 5, 2026) was an American graphic novelist, comic book artist, illustrator, painter and educator. He is known for his graphic novels and his series of books on how to illustrate in certain styles.

== Early life and education ==
Fish was raised by his mother, sister, two aunts and his maternal grandmother after his father abandoned the family when he was two years old.

He attended the School of Visual Arts in New York City, doing undergraduate studies in Comic Art and Illustration. At the School of Visual Arts, Fish studied under Will Eisner, a pioneer of the graphic novel medium. At the Rhode Island School of Design he did post-graduate studies in Illustration and Painting.

== Career ==
On November 14, 2018, Entertainment Weekly announced in and Exclusive that ARCHIE COMICS would be relaunching an all ages SABRINA THE TEENAGE WITCH comic book written by Kelly Thompson and illustrated by the husband and wife team of Andy and Veronica Fish.

In February 2018 Dark Horse Comics announced that it would be publishing a new horror/comedy mini series written by Evan Dorkin and illustrated by the husband and wife team of Andy and Veronica Fish.

Blackwood was released on May 30, 2018. Reviewing the book for Geek.com, Insha Fitzpatrick praised Fish's work on the book, writing:

"Andy Fish does all the silent back work for this comics, and it would be a shame if we don’t shout him out for it. He not only helps with color flats but also is an art assist and letterer to the comic. While everything he does for the comic is absolutely stellar, Fish’s lettering and layouts are absolute standouts. Fish's layouts are easy to follow. Every one always builds on top, and they have their own variation and unison to them that builds the story in a suspenseful way. I absolutely love experimental layout where panels are on top of panels and Fish does this amazingly. He provides a space where Veronica’s art can breathe freely, so you soak in every detail. He also does a massively incredible job with lettering this comic. Again, allowing you to follow easily, but gives tons of variations on the balloon placement and sound effects. This is one comic where the sound effects were absolutely effective and essential to be placed perfectly, and Fish nails it."

Fish illustrated a graphic novel written by humorist Steve Altes about high-tech pranks at the Massachusetts Institute of Technology titled Geeks & Greeks. The story was inspired by actual MIT hacks and incidents Altes experienced as an MIT student and fraternity resident. Geeks & Greeks (Relentless Goat Productions, Steve Altes (writer), Andy Fish (illustrator), Veronica Fish (colorist) ISBN 978-0-9963504-4-0) was published in 2016 to generally positive reviews.

Film rights to Geeks & Greeks have been optioned to Whydah Productions.

An ardent fan of actor Adam West, Fish drew The Misadventures of Adam West.

In 2017 Fish launched a vintage Batman comic serial, which comics culture blog 13th Dimension called, "the best Batman comic never published by DC."

He created illustrations for such corporate clients as Warner Bros, DC Comics, Nike, and Coca-Cola and his comics have appeared in Sports Illustrated, The New Yorker and The Boston Globe.

== Painting ==
One of Fish's illustrations

Fish's work has been exhibited in the Aurora Gallery in Worcester, Massachusetts, the Chashama Gallery in Manhattan, the Ad Hoc Gallery in Brooklyn, and galleries in Sydney, Australia. One of his paintings is in the collection of the National Gallery of Art in Washington, DC. Fish also participated in the 2008 Suckers and Biters Exhibit in Brooklyn.

== Teaching ==
Fish was an adjunct professor of art at Emerson College in Boston. He had also taught at the Worcester Art Museum and the Massachusetts College of Art and Design. Together with his wife, fellow artist Veronica Fish, Andy lectured at schools and libraries on the subjects of writing, comics, manga, graphic novels. He also presented programs on how to develop a career as a professional artist.

== Personal life and death ==
Fish lived in Worcester, Massachusetts with Veronica Fish. Andy and Veronica Fish also maintained a studio space in Nagoya, Japan. The two met at The Worcester Art Museum and after years of being friends they were married on a private beach in Wellfleet, Massachusetts. The two artists often worked together and travel to various comic book conventions throughout the United States and abroad. Fish had three sons from a previous marriage: Matthew, Joseph and Adam. He died on September 5, 2026, at the age of 60, following a battle with cancer.

== Awards ==
- 2014 – Boys and Girls Club Lifetime Achievement Honors
- 2014 – Pulp Factory Award (nominated)
- 2012 – New England Newspaper Association Illustrator Award (nominated)
- 2005 – New England Newspaper Association Illustrator Award (nominated)
- 2005 – World Smile Celebration Illustration
- 2005 – INKY Award for best digital comic book

== Bibliography ==
=== How to Draw series ===
Fish is the author and artist of several "how-to" illustration books published by Chartwell Books. They include:

- 2020 – Mastering Perspective, Walter Foster Books, ISBN 978-1633228580
- 2011 – How To Draw Superheroes, Chartwell Books, ISBN 978-0785827184
- 2011 – How To Draw Supernatural Beings, Chartwell Books, ISBN 978-0785827177
- 2010 – How To Draw Graphic Novel Style, Chartwell Books, ISBN 978-0785826705
- 2010 – How To Draw Tattoo Style, Chartwell Books, (with Veronica Hebard), ISBN 978-0785826699

=== Graphic novels and comics ===
Fish is the author and artist of the following graphic novels and comics:

- 2020 – Sabrina the Teenage Witch; Something Wicked, Archie Comics
- 2020 – Blackwood; Mourning After, Dark Horse Comics
- 2018 – Sabrina the Teenage Witch, Archie Comics
- 2018 – Blackwood, Dark Horse Comics
- 2014 – Geeks & Greeks, Relentless Goat Productions, ISBN 978-0996350440
- 2012 – Dracula's Army, McFarland Press ISBN 978-0786475827
- 2011 – Dracula: The Dead Travel Fast, Robo Picto Books, ISBN 978-1-4507-2895-9
- 2011 – Werewolves of Wisconsin, McFarland Press, ISBN 978-0786467983
- 2007 – The Tragic Tale of Turkey Boy: An American Love Story, Under Cover Books
- 2007 – Fly: A True Story Completely Made Up, Under Cover Books
- 2004 – Requiem, 24 Pages in 24 Hours, Blue Monkey Comics
- 2004 – Jerry Claus: The Return of Dark Santa, Blue Monkey Comics
- 2000 – Adam Bomb vs. the Moon Menace, Blue Monkey Comics
- 1999 – Adam Bomb, Blue Monkey Comics
- 1997 – Cable, Marshall Comics
- The Misadventures of Adam West: Vol. 5, Blue Water Productions
- Bagman at the World's Fair, Airship 27
- Crimson Mask, Airship 27
- Queen of Escapes, Airship 27
