= Kevin Panetta =

American comic book writer

Kevin Panetta is an American comic book writer, known for the series Zodiac Starforce, illustrated by Paulina Ganucheau, on Dark Horse Comics. The comic "immediately clicked with fans" and has been lauded for featuring a cast of strong diverse women as the central characters.

His graphic novel Bloom, illustrated by Ganucheau's sister Savannah who lives in Australia, was one of Kirkus Reviews Best Books of the Year in 2019.

Panetta has written for comics such as Steven Universe, Regular Show and Bravest Warriors. He lives in Washington DC with his wife and dog.
