= Annie Wu (artist) =

American comic book creator (born 1988)

- Born: 1988 (age 37–38)
- Education: Maryland Institute College of Art (BFA, Illustration, 2010)
- Occupation: Comic book artist

Annie Wu (born 1988) is an American comic book creator who has worked with DC Comics, Marvel Comics, and Vertigo (Comics). She has done work on Matt Fraction's Hawkeye and is a storyboard artist for Adult Swim's The Venture Bros.

== Early life ==
Annie Wu grew up in central Florida and graduated magna cum laude from Maryland Institute College of Art in Baltimore, Maryland in 2010.

== Career ==
Wu was the artist on the DC Comics series Black Canary that debuted in June 2015. Wu drew seven of the twelve issues that were published before the series' cancellation.

== Bibliography ==
=== Archie Comics ===
- Archie #4 (2015)

=== DC Comics ===
- Batman Beyond Unlimited #18 (2013)
- Batman Beyond: Batgirl Beyond (2014)
- Black Canary (2015 - 2016)

=== Marvel Comics ===
- Hawkeye (#14, #16, #19, #20, #21) (2013-2015)
- Young Avengers #14 (2013)
- Scarlet Witch #7 (2016)
- America #12 (2017)
- Miles Morales: Spider-Man #10 (2018)
- Black Cat #8 (2019)

=== Vertigo Comics ===
- House of Mystery #41
