= Riverdale season 1 =

Season of television series

Riverdale
- Season 1
- Home media cover
- Starring: KJ Apa; Lili Reinhart; Camila Mendes; Cole Sprouse; Marisol Nichols; Madelaine Petsch; Ashleigh Murray; Mädchen Amick; Luke Perry
- No. of episodes: 13

Release
- Original network: The CW
- Original release: January 26 – May 11, 2017

Season chronology
- Next → Season 2

The first season of Riverdale premiered on The CW on January 26, 2017 and concluded on May 11, 2017, with a total of 13 episodes. The series is based on the characters from the Archie Comics, created by Maurice Coyne, Louis Silberkleit, and John L. Goldwater, and was created by Roberto Aguirre-Sacasa.

The principal cast included the core four characters of the series Archie Andrews (KJ Apa), Betty Cooper (Lili Reinhart), Veronica Lodge (Camila Mendes), and Jughead Jones (Cole Sprouse), who also serves as the series narrator. Other cast members included Veronica's mother Hermione Lodge (Marisol Nichols), fellow students Cheryl Blossom (Madelaine Petsch) and Josie McCoy (Ashleigh Murray), Betty's mother Alice Cooper (Mädchen Amick), and Archie's father Fred Andrews (Luke Perry).

The first season focuses on the town of Riverdale in the aftermath of the death of Jason Blossom (Trevor Stines), who supposedly drowned the summer before school started.

== Episodes ==
No. overall	No. in season	Title	Directed by	Written by	Original release date	Prod. code	U.S. viewers (millions)
1	1	"Chapter One: The River's Edge"	Lee Toland Krieger	Roberto Aguirre-Sacasa	January 26, 2017	T15.10136	1.38
Archie Andrews discovers his passion for music after a tumultuous summer in Riverdale, marked by the supposed drowning of quarterback Jason Blossom. As Archie begins his sophomore year, he confides in Betty Cooper about his newfound love for music. Betty, who secretly harbors feelings for Archie, learns about his Fourth of July rendezvous with the music teacher, Ms. Grundy. Veronica Lodge, the daughter of wealthy parents facing legal troubles, arrives in town and catches Archie's eye, creating a love triangle. Despite the romantic entanglements, Betty and Veronica become fast friends, bonding over shared challenges. Cheryl Blossom, the cheerleading squad captain, harbors secrets related to her brother's death. Jughead Jones, Archie's former best friend, starts writing a novel recounting the summer events. Kevin Keller and Moose Mason make a grim discovery by the lake - Jason's lifeless body, revealing a gunshot wound to the head.
2	2	"Chapter Two: A Touch of Evil"	Lee Toland Krieger	Roberto Aguirre-Sacasa	February 2, 2017	T13.20302	1.15
Veronica's kiss with Archie strains his relationships with both Betty and Veronica. Miss Grundy insists on secrecy regarding the gunshot they heard after discovering Jason's body. Kevin, disturbed by the grim discovery, rejects Moose's affections. Jughead accidentally discovers Archie and Grundy holding hands, leading to a confrontation. Archie seeks advice from his father, Fred, and decides to confess to the sheriff, Kevin's father. Cheryl befriends Betty but blames Betty's sister, Polly, for Jason's death, ending their friendship. Cheryl's hallucination of Jason at a pep rally prompts a revelation to Veronica about Jason's supposed return. Against her mother's wishes, Betty renews her friendships with Archie and Veronica. Cheryl is arrested during science class based on autopsy evidence revealing Jason's murder occurred a week after the Fourth of July.
3	3	"Chapter Three: Body Double"	Lee Toland Krieger	Yolonda E. Lawrence	February 9, 2017	T13.20303	1.20
Cheryl confesses to Sheriff Keller and her parents, Clifford and Penelope, that she helped Jason fake his drowning as he wanted to run away. Upset with Alice's attacks on the Blossom family, Betty revives the school newspaper, The Blue and Gold, sending Jughead to interview Adventure Scouts who found Cheryl at Sweetwater River. Veronica discovers she's being slut-shamed by Chuck Clayton and, along with Betty and Cheryl, exposes evidence linking him and others, including Jason, to the shaming. Jughead uncovers that the gunshot on the Fourth of July was from a training exercise by Scoutmaster Dilton Doiley. Betty and Veronica take drastic measures against Chuck, Jughead pressures Dilton to confess, and Fred builds Archie a studio. Betty and Cheryl destroy evidence, but Dilton's revelation about Miss Grundy's car puts Archie's secret in jeopardy.
4	4	"Chapter Four: The Last Picture Show"	Mark Piznarski	Michael Grassi	February 16, 2017	T13.20304	1.14
Jughead faces despair as the local drive-in, where he works, is closing. Betty confronts Archie about his relationship with Miss Grundy, leading to an investigation with Veronica. Hermione denies any wrongdoing when questioned about her connection to a gang leader. Betty and Veronica discover that "Geraldine Grundy" doesn't exist and find a gun and ID with the name "Jennifer Gibson" in her car. Grundy reveals her true identity and motive to escape an abusive relationship. During the drive-in's final night, Veronica witnesses Hermione meeting the same man from before. Alice threatens to expose Archie's affair but agrees to back down if Grundy leaves town. Sheriff Keller realizes his evidence on Jason's murder has been stolen. Jughead, leaving his temporary home, vandalizes the projectionist's booth, revealing the gang leader as his father.
5	5	"Chapter Five: Heart of Darkness"	Jesse Warn	Ross Maxwell	February 23, 2017	T13.20305	0.98
Cheryl, rejected by her parents, speaks at Jason's memorial, breaking down during her speech. Archie and Reggie compete for the team captain position set by Coach Clayton. Archie meets a potential songwriting mentor, but the mentor declines. Betty discovers Jason's secretive behavior and rumored drug involvement from Trev. Jughead suggests searching the Blossom mansion for clues during the memorial dinner, revealing Jason's engagement to his grandmother, Rose. Hermione finds a snake-filled box, a warning from the Serpents, while Betty learns of a historical feud between her family and the Blossoms. Archie declines the team captain title for his music. Jughead and Betty suspect Betty's father, Hal, stole the sheriff's evidence.
6	6	"Chapter Six: Faster, Pussycats! Kill! Kill!"	Steven A. Adelson	Tessa Leigh Williams & Nicholas Zwart	March 2, 2017	T13.20306	1.09
With the annual variety show at Riverdale High approaching, Valerie's assistance to Archie creates tension with Josie. Betty and Jughead's investigation leads them to Betty's pregnant sister Polly, held at the Sisters of Quiet Mercy. Veronica realizes her mother, Hermione, is using her while building a connection with Fred at Andrews Construction. Josie faces family pressure during her father's visit for the variety show. Betty confronts her parents about Jason's death but finds no answers, growing closer to Jughead and sharing a kiss. They discover a hidden car in the woods with drugs and Jason's belongings, but an unknown perpetrator destroys the evidence. Simultaneously, Polly escapes from the home.
7	7	"Chapter Seven: In a Lonely Place"	Allison Anders	Aaron Allen	March 9, 2017	T13.20307	1.03
Cheryl alerts Sheriff Keller about Polly's escape, prompting a town search that fails. Tensions rise between the Blossoms and Coopers. Betty discovers Polly hiding in the attic, and Cheryl offers to help care for her. F.P. reveals he and Fred founded Andrews Construction, but Fred kicked him out for stealing money and substance abuse. Jughead is briefly a murder suspect, but Fred provides an alibi. Cheryl fears her parents' intentions for Polly, leading Polly to move in with the Lodges. F.P. is found with Jason's jacket in his trailer, raising suspicions.
8	8	"Chapter Eight: The Outsiders"	David Katzenberg	Julia Cohen	March 30, 2017	T13.20308	0.99
Polly discloses to Sheriff Keller that Jason was involved in a drug delivery for a biker gang, likely the Southside Serpents. Veronica suggests a baby shower for Polly, while Fred faces challenges in his construction project. Archie recruits friends to help, but Moose is attacked, leading to a confrontation with F.P. Jones, revealing Jughead's father as a Serpent. The baby shower becomes a battleground for Polly's custody, with Alice learning of Hal's threats and kicking him out. F.P. recruits Serpents to replace Fred's crew, revealing Hiram's involvement in the construction site attack. Polly decides to live with the Blossoms.
9	9	"Chapter Nine: La Grande Illusion"	Lee Rose	James DeWille	April 6, 2017	T13.20309	0.91
As the Blossom family's maple tree-tapping ceremony nears, Cheryl asks Archie to be her escort. Penelope offers to help him get into a music school if he agrees. Veronica befriends Ethel, but Hermione's revelation about her father's suicide attempt distresses her. Alice plans an exposé on the Blossoms, leading Hal to fire her from the paper. Betty discovers Polly moved in with the Blossoms to uncover Jason's death truth. Betty and Jughead decide to write an exposé for The Blue and Gold and invite Alice to join. Realizing the Blossoms' manipulation, Archie tries to reconcile with Val, who breaks up with him.
10	10	"Chapter Ten: The Lost Weekend"	Dawn Wilkinson	Britta Lundin & Brian E. Paterson	April 13, 2017	T13.20310	0.87
Fred departs for Chicago to finalize his divorce, leaving Archie alone. Betty discovers Jughead's upcoming birthday and convinces Archie to let them throw him a party. Hiram pressures Veronica to testify on his behalf, threatening Hermione. Veronica is elected captain of the Vixens, leading Cheryl to crash the party with Chuck. F.P. arrives after Betty's insistence, and tensions rise. A game orchestrated by Cheryl forces participants to reveal secrets, escalating into a fight between Jughead and Chuck. F.P. ends the party, urging Jughead to reconcile with Betty. Archie and Veronica share a kiss. Veronica decides to testify for Hiram. Archie's surprise awaits as his father returns with his mother, Mary.
11	11	"Chapter Eleven: To Riverdale and Back Again"	Kevin Sullivan	Roberto Aguirre-Sacasa	April 27, 2017	T13.20311	0.89
Archie and his mother reconnect, while Veronica discovers Hiram might soon be released from prison. F.P. questions Jughead's novel's purpose, advising him to move on. To uncover the truth about Hiram, Veronica investigates F.P. as a possible suspect in Jason's murder. The Blossoms forbid Polly from their master bedroom. Fred and Mary plan to attend homecoming together. Polly and Cheryl find Polly's engagement ring in Penelope's collection, leading to a confrontation. At dinner, Alice questions F.P., who shuts her down and reveals they are moving to Toledo. Archie and Veronica perform at homecoming, but police find a gun in F.P.'s trailer, arresting him for murder. Jughead disappears, and Archie and Veronica suspect someone is framing F.P. for Jason's death.
12	12	"Chapter Twelve: Anatomy of a Murder"	Rob Seidenglanz	Michael Grassi	May 4, 2017	T13.20312	0.98
Jughead's mother refuses to let him move in with her. F.P. confesses to everything, including Jason's murder. Betty and Alice catch Hal trying to destroy evidence, revealing a family secret: the Coopers are actually Blossoms by blood, making Jason and Polly's relationship technically incest. The Coopers take Polly home. Mary, posing as F.P.'s lawyer, advises Jughead, who is told never to visit his father again. With Joaquin's help, the group finds one of F.P.'s associates dead. The police discover a bag of money with Hermione's initials. Hal and Hermione are cleared as suspects, prompting Jughead and Betty to investigate a lead from Kevin, finding Jason's varsity jacket with a thumb drive inside. They discover Clifford murdered Jason and inform Cheryl. Despite this, Jughead's father still faces charges. Veronica learns Hiram is released, and Mary returns to Chicago. The police find Clifford dead by hanging in the syrup distillery when trying to arrest him.
13	13	"Chapter Thirteen: The Sweet Hereafter"	Lee Toland Krieger	Roberto Aguirre-Sacasa	May 11, 2017	T13.20313	0.96
Clifford's involvement in the drug business is revealed, leading him to kill Jason to protect the family secret. F.P. is cleared of murder charges but remains in custody. Alice discloses to Betty that she gave birth to a baby boy in high school, whom she put up for adoption at the Sisters of Quiet Mercy. Jughead is placed with a foster family and transfers to Southside High. Cheryl, devastated by her father's secrets and suicide, attempts suicide in Sweetwater River but is saved by Archie, Veronica, Betty, and Jughead. Cheryl later burns down Thornhill mansion. Jughead is invited to join the Southside Serpents. The next day at Pop's, a masked gunman arrives, demanding Fred's wallet. When Archie intervenes, the gunman shoots Fred.

== Cast and characters ==
=== Main ===
- KJ Apa as Archie Andrews, the main protagonist of the series, a high school football player who has a passion for music and a crush on Veronica.
- Lili Reinhart as Betty Cooper, Archie's childhood friend who has had a crush on him since childhood and who's also the editor for The Blue and Gold. She later became Jughead's girlfriend.
- Camila Mendes as Veronica Lodge, a former "It girl" from Manhattan who tries to be a better person and is friends with Betty.
- Cole Sprouse as Jughead Jones, Archie and Betty's former childhood friend who is now a homeless teen writing stories at Pop's and secretly living in the Riverdale High closet and formerly the Twilight Drive-In. He also falls in love with Betty, thus becoming her boyfriend.
- Marisol Nichols as Hermione Lodge, Veronica's mother and a former New York high society socialite who now works as a waitress at Pop's.
- Madelaine Petsch as Cheryl Blossom, a member of the aristocratic Blossom family living in Thornhill who tries to investigate her brother's death which she is traumatized from.
- Ashleigh Murray as Josie McCoy, a singer and leader of the band Josie and the Pussycats who has problems with Archie's music passion.
- Mädchen Amick as Alice Cooper, Betty and Polly's mother, Hal's wife and the co-owner and journalist for The Register.
- Luke Perry as Fred Andrews, Archie's father, Mary's separated husband and the owner and foreman of Andrews Construction Company who also dated Hermione in high school before she left him for Hiram.

=== Recurring ===
- Casey Cott as Kevin Keller, Riverdale's resident gay teenager who likes cruising Fox Forest.
- Skeet Ulrich as F.P Jones, Jughead's alcoholic estranged father, a drug dealer and the leader of the biker gang The Southside Serpents.
- Martin Cummins as Tom Keller, Kevin's father and the sheriff of Riverdale trying to uncover the mystery of Jason Blossom's death.
- Robin Givens as Sierra McCoy, Josie's mother and the Mayor of Riverdale who is also trying to uncover the mystery of Jason's death whilst also help the town move on from it.
- Nathalie Boltt as Penelope Blossom, Cheryl and the deceased Jason's mother, Nana Rose's daughter-in-law and Clifford's wife who constantly makes her daughter's life miserable.
- Barclay Hope as Clifford Blossom, Penelope's husband, Nana Rose's son and Cheryl and the deceased Jason's father who is also the owner and heir to Blossom Maple Syrup.
- Lochlyn Munro as Hal Cooper, Betty and Polly's father, Alice's husband and a newspaper magnate and owner of the Riverdale newspaper company The Register who hides many secrets from the family.
- Tiera Skovbye as Polly Cooper, Betty's older sister, Alice and Hal's daughter and the deceased Jason's former lover who is now trapped at the Sisters of Quiet Mercy.
- Hayley Law as Valerie Brown, a member of the Pussycats who also helps and dates Archie for a while.
- Peter James Bryant as Waldo Weatherbee, the principal of Riverdale High helping the town move on from Jason's death.
- Sarah Habel as Geraldine Grundy, the Riverdale High music teacher who has an intense affair with Archie.
- Rob Raco as Joaquin DeSantos, the youngest member of the Southside Serpents and Kevin's secret boyfriend.
- Asha Bromfield as Melody Valentine, the third member of the Pussycats who also tries to help Archie with Valerie but also stays loyal to Josie.
- Ross Butler as Reggie Mantle, Riverdale's prankster, member of the High school football team the Riverdale Bulldogs, Archie's rival and the school bully and jock.
- Jordan Calloway as Chuck Clayton, Reggie and Moose's friend, Coach Clayton's son, a member of the Riverdale Bulldogs and a misogynist slut shamer.
- Cody Kearsley as Marmaduke "Moose" Mason, Reggie and Chuck's friend, a member of the Riverdale Bulldogs and Kevin's former secret boyfriend hiding his bisexuality.
- Shannon Purser as Ethel Muggs, an innocent girl with depression who is a target of bullying and slut-shaming by Chuck.
- Olivia Ryan Stern as Tina Patel, one of Cheryl's cronies, Ginger's best friend and a cheerleader who helps Cheryl alongside Ginger.
- Caitlin Mitchell-Markovitch as Ginger Lopez, one of Cheryl's cronies, Tina's best friend and a cheerleader who helps Cheryl along with Tina.
- Major Curda as Dilton Doiley, the leader of the Riverdale Boy Scouts with a connection and clue to Jason's death.
  - Daniel Yang portrays Dilton Doiley in the pilot
- Alvin Sanders as Pop Tate, the kindly and aging owner of Pop's Chocke-Litte Shoppe who provides comfort to the main characters, specifically Jughead.
- Tom McBeath as Smithers, Veronica and Hermione's butler at the Pembrooke who is loyal to them.
- Colin Lawrence as Floyd Clayton, the leader and coach of the Riverdale Bulldogs and Chuck's father who tries to make Archie be the Captain of the team and make him compete against Reggie.
- Molly Ringwald as Mary Andrews, Archie's estranged mother, Fred's separated and estranged wife and a Chicago lawyer who returns to the town to help her son.
- Trevor Stines as Jason Blossom, Cheryl's twin brother, Penelope and Clifford's son, Nana Rose's grandson, Polly's boyfriend, the Captain of the Bulldogs and heir to Blossom Maple Syrup who dies in the opening scene of the series and whose death is a major factor and impact for the rest of the characters and season.

=== Guest ===
- Mackenzie Gray as Dr. Curdle, a morgue doctor and attendant who helps Alice with the Jason Blossom murder.
- Adain Bradley as Trev Brown, Valerie's younger brother and a member of Dilton's Boy Scouts who helps Jughead.
- Raúl Castillo as Oscar Castillo, a music teacher and manager from New York who tries to mentor Archie.
- Reese Alexander as Myles McCoy, Josie's father, Sierra's husband and a former musician and recovering drug addict.
- Alison Araya as Ms. Weiss, a teacher at Riverdale High.
- Scott McNeil as Tall Boy, an aging member of the Southside Serpents who's FP's second-in-command and acting leader whilst he's gone.
- Barbara Wallace as Rose Blossom, the aging matriarch of the Blossom family, Chery and the deceased Jason's grandmother, Penelope's mother-in-law and Clifford's mother who tries to find out why Jason died.
- Moses Thiessen as Ben Button, a pizza delivery boy in Riverdale.

== Production ==
=== Development ===
Originally in development at Fox, it was announced in 2014 that Warner Bros TV would be producing the series through Berlanti Productions as Robert Aguirre-Sacasa, Greg Berlanti (creator of Supergirl and Arrow), and Sarah Schechter, and Jon Goldwater, the CEO of Archie Comics as executive producers. In July 2015, it was announced that Riverdale had moved to The CW and that Aguirre-Sacasa would be writing the pilot episode. On January 29, 2016, The CW officially ordered a pilot and on May 16, 2016 it was picked up for series. In November 2016, it was announced the first episode would air on January 26, 2017.

=== Writing ===
Robert Aguirre-Sacasa stated that the show was not directly inspired by the comics reboot that occurred in 2015, as the show had already been pitched to Fox at that point. He also stated he was aware that the show needed to be more accessible for a modern audience, unlike the original comics. He stated that the show would follow a serialized, neo-noir format. At San Diego Comic Con 2016, Aguirre-Sacasa explained that the first season would follow what happened to Jason Blossom, a teen who died the summer before school started and stated that the murder solving would not be dragged out. Talking about the darker themes of the show, he states he was inspired by coming of ages films such as Stand By Me and River's Edge. He said that he thought, "What would a coming of age story be like, if David Lynch made it, or if Stephen King wrote it?" In January 2017, it was revealed that the show would not be making Jughead asexual, which was revealed in February 2016, stating that the first season was aiming to be an origin story for the 75 years of history. Actor Cole Sprouse stated in an interview that he would like it to be explored in future seasons.

=== Casting ===
On February 9, 2016 the first casting announcements were made with Lili Reinhart and Cole Sprouse being announced to be playing Betty Cooper and Jughead Jones respectively. On February 24, 2016 Madelaine Petsch was announced to be playing Cheryl Blossom and Luke Perry of Beverly Hills, 90210 would be playing Fred Andrews, the father of Archie Andrews. That same day it was announced that Ashleigh Murray and KJ Apa would be playing Josie McCoy and Archie Andrews respectively. Apa was one of the last to audition for Archie and got the role after months of searching for an actor. Two days later, it was announced that newcomer Camila Mendes would star as Veronica Lodge. In March 2016, it was announced that her mother, Hermione Lodge, would be played by Marisol Nichols and Betty's mother, Alice Cooper, would be played by Mädchen Amick.

In March 2016, it was announced that Ross Butler, Daniel Young, and Cody Kearsley would be joining the show in recurring roles as Reggie Mantle, Dilton Doiley, and Moose Mason respectively. That same month it was announced that Casey Cott would star as Kevin Keller, the first openly gay character in the Archie universe. In August 2016, Robin Givens was cast as the mother of Josie McCoy and mayor of Riverdale, while in December 2016 it was announced that Molly Ringwald would appear in a recurring role as Mary Andrews, the mother of Archie Andrews.

=== Filming ===
Filming for the pilot lasted from March 14 to 31, 2016 in Vancouver, British Columbia. Production on the remaining 12 episodes of season one began on September 7, 2016, in Vancouver and wrapped on December 12, 2016.

=== Music ===
Riverdale features a number of musical performances throughout the first season, blending a mix of covers and original songs. Songs that are performed in the episode are released as digital singles after the episode airs. WaterTower Music released a digital compilation for songs from the first season on May 12, 2017. The score for the season, composed by Blake Neely, was released on a physical CD by La-La Land Records, and simultaneously on download by WaterTower Music, on July 18, 2017.

Riverdale: Season 1 (Original Television Soundtrack)
No.	Title	Artist(s)	Length
1.	"The Song That Everyone Sings"	KJ Apa	3:46
2.	"Fear Nothing"	Ashleigh Murray, Asha Bromfield and Hayley Law	2:37
3.	"All Through The Night"	Ashleigh Murray, Asha Bromfield and Hayley Law	2:37
4.	"Dance Dance Dance"	KJ Apa	1:00
5.	"Candy Girl (Sugar, Sugar) (Note: Cover of the Inner Circle version feat. Flo Rida; full-length version, Petsch is not heard on the aired version.)"	Ashleigh Murray, Asha Bromfield, Hayley Law and Madelaine Petsch	2:19
6.	"I Feel Love"	Ashleigh Murray, Asha Bromfield, Hayley Law and Camila Mendes	3:11
7.	"I'll Try"	KJ Apa	3:15
8.	"I Got You"	KJ Apa and Hayley Law	3:32
9.	"Kids in America"	KJ Apa and Camila Mendes	2:55
10.	"Our Fair Riverdale"	Ashleigh Murray, Asha Bromfield, Hayley Law	1:19
11.	"Astronaut"	Ashleigh Murray, Asha Bromfield, Hayley Law and Camila Mendes	3:28
12.	"These Are the Moments I Remember"	Ashleigh Murray, Asha Bromfield, Hayley Law, Camila Mendes and KJ Apa	2:58

== Release ==
The season began airing on The CW on January 26, 2017 and ended on May 11 of the same year. In late 2016, it was revealed that Netflix in the United Kingdom acquired the rights to air Riverdale less than 24 hours after the episodes premiered.

== Home media ==
The Complete First Season was officially released on DVD in region 1 on August 15, 2017, by Warner Bros. Entertainment Inc. For region 2, it was released a day before on August 14, and for region 4, it was released on August 18. The season was also released on Blu-ray for region A by Warner Archives and for region B by Warner Bros. Entertainment Inc.

Riverdale: The Complete First Season
Set details		Special features
13 episodes; 3-disc set; English (Dolby 5.1 Dolby Digital); English SDH subtitles; Spanish & French subtitles (DVD Only); Runtime: 555 minutes		5 All-New Featurettes: The New Normal; I Got You; Riverdale: 2016 Comic-Con Panel; Riverdale: The Ultimate Sin; These Are Moments I Remember; Unaired Scenes; Gag Reel
Release dates
Region 1	Region 2	Region 4
August 15, 2017	August 14, 2017	August 18, 2017 (Mexico); October 4, 2017 (Australia)

== Reception ==
=== Critical response ===
On review aggregator website Rotten Tomatoes, the first season holds an approval rating of 88% based on 62 reviews, and an average rating of 7.22/10. The site's critics consensus reads: "Riverdale offers an amusingly self-aware reimagining of its classic source material that proves eerie, odd, daring, and above all addictive." On Metacritic the first season has a weighted average score of 68 out of 100, based on 36 critics, indicating "generally favourable reviews".

Speaking positive of the show, Ellen Gray of The Philadelphia Inquirer compared the show to Twin Peaks and Dawson's Creek, and praised the adaptation of the characters. Jeff Jenson of Entertainment Weekly similarly praised the show, stating that Berlanti and Aguirre-Sacasa "built a sturdy, appealing foundation", as well as paying homage to pop culture and "[spitting] on them too." Writing for The Washington Post, Hank Stuever commented on the show's departure from its source material, stating that it's watchable but "entertainment value comes at a steep price, cashing out Archie's underlying innocence to depict the corrupted community he calls home." Despite the difference from the source material, he praised the show and noted that it "can be terrific once you let go and let Archie grow up his own way" Liz Shannon Miller of IndieWire criticized several stereotypes the show portrayed (such as Kevin being the 'gay best friend'), however commended the show for being "100 percent committed to creating its own little world" and praised the "strong visual choices".

More critical of the series, Ira Madison of MTV News criticized the narration, referring to it as "overwritten and dire" and thought the relationships had "no lasting impact." As well, he disliked the lack of an "outsize metaphor that brings home a point in each episode." Daniel D'Addario of Time also criticized the adaptation from the source material, the voice overs by Cole Sprouse and the many cultural references the show makes. Allison Keene of Collider said the series "isn't as nearly as quirky as its early stylistic flourishes would like to suggest", referring to the series as campy and overwritten. She criticized the inclusion of the murder plot lines, stating the show "missed [an] opportunity to tell a strong, high school-set story".

=== Ratings ===
Viewership and ratings per episode of Riverdale season 1
No.	Title	Air date	Rating/share (18–49)	Viewers (millions)	DVR (18–49)	DVR viewers (millions)	Total (18–49)	Total viewers (millions)
1	"Chapter One: The River's Edge"	January 26, 2017	0.5/2	1.38	0.4	1.01	0.9	2.38
2	"Chapter Two: A Touch of Evil"	February 2, 2017	0.4/2	1.15	0.4	0.76	0.8	1.91
3	"Chapter Three: Body Double"	February 9, 2017	0.5/2	1.20	—N/a	0.71	—N/a	1.90
4	"Chapter Four: The Last Picture Show"	February 16, 2017	0.4/1	1.14	0.4	0.73	0.8	1.87
5	"Chapter Five: Heart of Darkness"	February 23, 2017	0.3/1	0.98	0.4	0.71	0.7	1.69
6	"Chapter Six: Faster, Pussycats! Kill! Kill!"	March 2, 2017	0.4/1	1.09	—N/a	—N/a	—N/a	—N/a
7	"Chapter Seven: In a Lonely Place"	March 9, 2017	0.4/1	1.03	0.3	0.76	0.7	1.80
8	"Chapter Eight: The Outsiders"	March 30, 2017	0.4/2	0.99	—N/a	0.55	—N/a	1.54
9	"Chapter Nine: La Grande Illusion"	April 6, 2017	0.3/1	0.91	—N/a	0.63	—N/a	1.54
10	"Chapter Ten: The Lost Weekend"	April 13, 2017	0.3/1	0.87	0.3	0.58	0.6	1.48
11	"Chapter Eleven: To Riverdale and Back Again"	April 27, 2017	0.3/1	0.89	—N/a	—N/a	—N/a	—N/a
12	"Chapter Twelve: Anatomy of a Murder"	May 4, 2017	0.3/1	0.98	0.3	0.58	0.6	1.56
13	"Chapter Thirteen: The Sweet Hereafter"	May 11, 2017	0.4/2	0.96	—N/a	0.56	—N/a	1.52

=== Awards and nominations ===
Year	Award	Category	Nominee(s)	Result	Ref.
2017	Leo Awards	Best Production Design in a Dramatic Series	Tyler Harron (for "The River's Edge")	Nominated	
2017	Saturn Awards	Best Action-Thriller Television Series	Riverdale	Won	
2017	Saturn Awards	Best Performance by a Younger Actor in a Television Series	KJ Apa	Nominated	
2017	Saturn Awards	Breakthrough Performance	KJ Apa	Won	
2017	Teen Choice Awards	Choice Breakout TV Show	Riverdale	Won	
2017	Teen Choice Awards	Choice Breakout TV Star	KJ Apa	Nominated	
2017	Teen Choice Awards	Choice Breakout TV Star	Lili Reinhart	Won	
2017	Teen Choice Awards	Choice Drama TV Actor	Cole Sprouse	Won	
2017	Teen Choice Awards	Choice Drama TV Show	Riverdale	Won	
2017	Teen Choice Awards	Choice Hissy Fit	Madelaine Petsch	Won	
2017	Teen Choice Awards	Choice Scene Stealer	Camila Mendes	Won	
2017	Teen Choice Awards	Choice TV Ship	Lili Reinhart and Cole Sprouse	Won	
