= Chapter Twelve: Anatomy of a Murder =

- Riverdale episode
- Newspaper showing FP Jones's arrest for the murder of Jason Blossom
- Episode no.: Season 1 Episode 12
- Directed by: Rob Seidenglanz
- Written by: Michael Grassi
- Cinematography by: Stephen Jackson
- Editing by: Paul Karasick
- Production code: T13.20312
- Original air date: May 4, 2017
- Running time: 42 minutes

Episode chronology
← Previous "Chapter Eleven: To Riverdale and Back Again"	Next → "Chapter Thirteen; The Sweet Hereafter"

"Chapter Twelve: Anatomy of a Murder" is the twelfth episode of the first season of the American television show Riverdale. The episode was written by Michael Grassi and directed by Rob Seidenglanz. It originally aired on The CW in the United States on May 4, 2017.

The episode focuses on the main characters discovering information regarding the death of Jason Blossom, which had served as the main story arc for the first season of the show. The episode received primarily positive reviews and was watched by 0.995 million viewers in its initial broadcast.

== Plot ==
Following the events of the previous episode, FP Jones is in jail for the murder of Jason Blossom, with the murder weapon found in his trailer. However, Archie and Veronica had searched earlier and had not found the weapon, leading them to believe that FP was framed. However, he confesses to the murder and tells Sheriff Keller how and why he did it, also admitting that he had stolen files related to the investigation from the sheriff's home. The confession leaves FP's son Jughead despondent, but after being consoled by his friends, he is also convinced of his father's innocence. Investigating further, they talk to Joaquin, another member of FP's gang, the Southside Serpents. He reveals that FP had been responsible for getting rid of Jason's dead body and that he was helped by Joaquin and another Serpent. They go to question this other Serpent, but discover his dead body in a motel, a victim of an apparent drug overdose. Police discover a bag of money in the motel room with the initials "H.L." on it, tying the murder to Veronica's father Hiram Lodge.

Meanwhile, Betty's dad Hal Cooper reveals that he was the one who stole the files from the sheriff's house, as he was afraid that the files could lead the sheriff to implicating the Cooper family in the murder, since Jason was dating his other daughter Polly at the time of his death. This reveal shows that FP's confession was at least partially false, and eventually another Serpent reveals the location of a bag FP had hidden in the woods as a "contingency plan". Inside the bag, they find Jason's letterman jacket and a thumb drive with a security camera video showing Jason's father Clifford murdering him. They turn the evidence over to the police and learn that, while Clifford was responsible for Jason's death, FP had falsified his confession after Clifford threatened to kill Jughead if he told the truth. The police go to arrest Clifford, but find him hanging on his family estate, next to hidden bags of drugs.

== Cast and characters ==
=== Starring ===
- KJ Apa as Archie Andrews
- Lili Reinhart as Betty Cooper
- Camila Mendes as Veronica Lodge
- Cole Sprouse as Jughead Jones
- Marisol Nichols as Hermione Lodge
- Madelaine Petsch as Cheryl Blossom
- Mädchen Amick as Alice Cooper
- Luke Perry as Fred Andrews

=== Guest starring ===
- Casey Cott as Kevin Keller
- Martin Cummins as Tom Keller
- Robin Givens as Sierra McCoy
- Molly Ringwald as Mary Andrews
- Skeet Ulrich as F.P. Jones
- Nathalie Boltt as Penelope Blossom
- Peter James Bryant as Mr. Weatherbee
- Barclay Hope as Clifford Blossom
- Lochlyn Munro as Hal Cooper
- Rob Raco as Joaquin DeSantos
- Christopher Rosamond as Mustang
- Tiera Skovbye as Polly Cooper

=== Co-starring ===
- Wonita Joy as Counter Lady
- Samantha Spear as Deputy
- Trevor Stines as Jason Blossom

== Production ==
During the production of season 1, it was decided that the season-long mystery surrounding Jason Blossom's murder would be resolved in the penultimate episode. This decision was disapproved of by some studio executives who felt that the reveal should have been saved for the season finale, but executive producer Greg Berlanti approved of the idea, telling the writers, "Solve the mystery in the penultimate episode so that in the last episode, you can get back to all the characters and not make it about the mystery." Overall, show creator and showrunner Roberto Aguirre-Sacasa expressed satisfaction with how the two episodes were handled.

== Reception ==
=== Critical reception ===
The episode received overall positive reviews. Film website CinemaBlend ranked it number 2 on their list of the best episodes of Riverdale (as of December 5, 2021), saying, "It was like the perfect bow on the mystery that captured everyone’s attention, from the clues, to the reveal of who did it, to the very ending sequence. Everything was so delicately crafted that it felt like a true murder mystery, one that almost reminded me of Knives Out." An article in Birth.Movies.Death. gave the episode a good review, praising the reveal as a satisfying conclusion to the season-long mystery regarding Jason's death. Den of Geek gave the episode 5 out of 5 stars, praising the set-up for the season finale and calling the episode "an incredibly satisfying episode that lays the groundwork for dark things to come". The A.V. Club gave the episode an A rating, calling it "easily Archie’s best episode" and similarly expressing interest in how the season finale would conclude the season.

=== Ratings ===
The episode was watched by 0.995 million viewers and received a television rating of 0.4 in the key demographic of 18- to 49-year-olds.
