= Chapter Thirteen: The Sweet Hereafter =

- Riverdale episode
- Archie, Betty, Jughead, and Veronica saving Cheryl from the frozen river
- Episode no.: Season 1 Episode 13
- Directed by: Lee Toland Krieger
- Written by: Roberto Aguirre-Sacasa
- Cinematography by: Stephen Jackson
- Editing by: Dan Holland
- Production code: T13.20313
- Original air date: May 11, 2017
- Running time: 42 minutes

Episode chronology
← Previous "Chapter Twelve: Anatomy of a Murder"	Next → "Chapter Fourteen: A Kiss Before Dying"

"Chapter Thirteen: The Sweet Hereafter" is the thirteenth and final episode of the first season of the American television series Riverdale. The episode was written by Roberto Aguirre-Sacasa and directed by Lee Toland Krieger. It originally aired on the CW in the United States on May 11, 2017.

The episode revolves around the fallout from the revelation of Jason Blossom's murder, which concludes the season-long arc. The episode received overall positive reviews, with several reviewers highlighting the cliffhanger ending. In its initial broadcast, it was watched by 0.951 million viewers.

== Plot ==
In the previous episode, Clifford Blossom was found hanging in his barn from an apparent suicide. This episode picks up with that and reveals that Clifford killed himself when it became apparent that he had killed his son Jason Blossom. Jason had threatened to expose his dad's crime, as it is revealed that Clifford had used his maple syrup business as a front for trafficking heroin from Canada. At the same time, FP Jones is incarcerated for his involvement with Jason's death. While Sheriff Tom Keller wants him to give him the names of Southside Serpents (Jones's gang) who were involved in Clifford's drug businesses, though Jones maintains their innocence and refuses to name names.

At Riverdale High School, Archie Andrews and Veronica Lodge reveal that they are dating. Meanwhile, Betty Cooper is writing an article on FP's innocence, though her mom Alice Cooper refuses to print it in The Riverdale Register out of fear of retribution for defending the Serpents, who have become a target for the town's anger. Betty decides to publish the article anyways on the school newspaper's website, which leads to her locker being vandalized with "Go to Hell Serpent Slut" written in pig's blood. Around this time, Betty also begins pushing Alice to reveal more family secrets, where she learns that, while in high school, Alice gave up a son for adoption through the Sisters of Quiet Mercy and never mentioned this to Betty or her sister Polly. At the same time, Jughead Jones (FP's son and Betty's boyfriend) gets placed with a foster family and transfers to Southside High School. Later, some Serpents tell Jughead that they respect his father for not ratting them out and offer him their protection and a leather Serpents jacket.

Clifford's daughter Cheryl Blossom, distraught over her father's death, walks out onto the frozen Sweetwater River in a suicide attempt, though Archie, Betty, Jughead, and Veronica arrive there just as she falls into the water. Archie manages to save her by punching through the ice and performing CPR on her. After recovering, Cheryl burns down her family's mansion, Thornhill, in an act of rebellion against her mom, Penelope Blossom. That same night, Mayor Sierra McCoy is hosting a jubilee for the town's 75th anniversary where Archie performs an original musical number with Josie and the Pussycats. After this, Betty gives a speech that both highlights the good of Riverdale but calls attention to its many flaws and that the town must do better in order to avoid future tragedies like what happened with the Blossoms.

The next morning, Archie meets with his dad Fred Andrews at Pop's Chock'lit Shoppe. However, while he is in the bathroom, a masked gunman tries to rob the store before turning his attention to Fred, who is shot. The episode ends with the gunman fleeing from the store as Fred, bleeding, is held in Archie's arms.

== Cast and characters ==
=== Starring ===
- KJ Apa as Archie Andrews
- Lili Reinhart as Betty Cooper
- Camila Mendes as Veronica Lodge
- Cole Sprouse as Jughead Jones
- Marisol Nichols as Hermione Lodge
- Madelaine Petsch as Cheryl Blossom
- Ashleigh Murray as Josie McCoy
- Mädchen Amick as Alice Cooper
- Luke Perry as Fred Andrews

=== Guest starring ===
- Casey Cott as Kevin Keller
- Martin Cummins as Tom Keller
- Robin Givens as Sierra McCoy
- Skeet Ulrich as F.P. Jones
- Nathalie Boltt as Penelope Blossom
- Asha Bromfield as Melody Valentine
- Peter James Bryant as Mr. Weatherbee
- Hayley Law as Valerie Brown
- Lochlyn Munro as Hal Cooper
- Tiera Skovbye as Polly Cooper

=== Co-starring ===
- Alison Araya as Ms. Weiss
- Jay Clift as Gunman
- Helen Dixon as Old Waitress
- Arthur Mackinnon as Other Serpent
- Tom McBeath as Smithers
- Scott McNeil as Older Serpent
- Alvin Sanders as Pop Tate
- Trevor Stines as Jason Blossom

== Production ==
It was decided during the production of season 1 that the penultimate episode of the season would resolve the storyline involving Jason Blossom's death, a decision that, according to showrunner Roberto Aguirre-Sacasa, was not well-received by some network executives. However, executive producer Greg Berlanti supported the idea, saying, "Solve the mystery in the penultimate episode so that in the last episode, you can get back to all the characters and not make it about the mystery". Additionally during production, Aguirre-Sacasa stated that there had been plans to have the introduction of Sabrina Spellman from the show Chilling Adventures of Sabrina be the cliffhanger, though these plans were ultimately dropped.

== Reception ==
=== Critical reception ===
The episode received overall positive reviews. A review in Entertainment Weekly called the episode "a very tantalizing and therapeutic season finale". Film website CinemaBlend ranked it number 1 on their list of the best episodes of Riverdale (as of December 5, 2021), praising the episode's conclusions for the plotlines of season 1 and highlighting the cliffhanger ending. In their review, they state, "This is, hands down, the best episode of Riverdale, and I personally think it will forever remain that because of how well it was handled". The A.V. Club gave the episode an A rating, similarly pointing out the cliffhanger ending. Den of Geek gave the episode 4.5 out of 5 stars and complemented the episode as "a juggling act between the revealtion [sic] of secrets and establishing new mysteries that will dominate the next season". An article in Birth.Movies.Death. gave the episode and season as a whole a positive review, saying, "Riverdale came out of the gate strong and stayed that way, one of the most successful and rewarding first seasons of any show in recent memory." Showrunner Aguirre-Sacasa listed the episode as one of the ones he's most proud to have worked on and said that the sequence with Archie saving Cheryl at the river was one of his favorite sequences in the show.

=== Ratings ===
The episode was watched by 0.951 million viewers and received a television rating of 0.4 in the key demographic of 18- to 49-year-olds.
