= Chapter One: The River's Edge =

- Riverdale episode
- Promotional poster
- Episode no.: Season 1 Episode 1
- Directed by: Lee Toland Krieger
- Written by: Roberto Aguirre-Sacasa
- Based on: Characters by Archie Comics
- Cinematography by: Stephen Jackson; David Lanzenberg
- Editing by: Harry Jierjian
- Production code: T15.10136
- Original air date: January 26, 2017
- Running time: 46 minutes

Episode chronology
← Previous —	Next → "Chapter Two: A Touch of Evil"
- Riverdale season 1

"Chapter One: The River's Edge" is the pilot and first episode of the first season of the American television series Riverdale, based on the characters by Archie Comics, revolving around the character of Archie Andrews and his life in the small town of Riverdale while exploring the darkness hidden behind its seemingly-perfect image. The episode was written by series creator and Archie Comics' chief creative officer Roberto Aguirre-Sacasa, and was directed by Lee Toland Krieger.

The pilot was first screened at the Warner Bros. Television panel at San Diego Comic-Con in July 2016. It originally aired on The CW on January 26, 2017, and according to Nielsen Media Research, was watched by 1.38 million viewers.

== Plot ==
On the Fourth of July, twins Cheryl and Jason Blossom are rowing down Sweetwater River in the town of Riverdale when their boat capsizes. Cheryl is found on the banks, but tells the authorities that Jason is missing, presumably drowned. As the new school year approaches, Jason's disappearance weighs on the minds of the citizens of Riverdale, with the exception of Veronica Lodge, who has just moved to Riverdale from New York City with her mother Hermione after her father Hiram is arrested for embezzlement.

Veronica integrates herself into Riverdale High, becoming fast friends with fellow sophomores Betty Cooper and Archie Andrews. Archie is struggling to juggle his passions for music and football, as well as his dedication to his father's construction company, while Betty is navigating her romantic feelings for Archie, as well as the whims of her controlling mother, Alice. Veronica convinces Betty to try out for the cheerleading team, the River Vixens, which are captained by Cheryl. Cheryl uses the audition to bully Betty, but after Veronica stands up for her friend, both girls make the team.

As the authorities continue to investigate Jason's disappearance, Archie tells his music teacher, Miss Grundy, that they should report the gunshots that they heard while they were on the river banks. Miss Grundy refuses, saying that reporting what they know to the authorities would only reveal their illegal affair.

Archie, Betty, and Veronica attend the back-to-school dance together, and Veronica persuades Betty to admit her feelings to Archie. Archie, still grappling with his relationship with Miss Grundy, does not respond. The gang reconvenes at the Blossom mansion for a game of seven minutes in heaven, in which Archie and Veronica are paired. The two use the opportunity to ask questions about each other's lives before giving in to their physical attraction and share a first kiss. When they emerge from the closet, Betty has vanished. Archie finds her in front of her house, and explains that while he does love her, he does not think he is (and will be) good enough for her since he views her as "so perfect". A heartbroken Betty tearfully retreats inside as Archie watches, also heartbroken.

Later that night, Kevin Keller and Moose Mason have come to the river to hook up, when Kevin discovers Jason's body, with a gunshot wound in his head. Archie's ex-best friend, Jughead Jones, begins to write a book detailing the events of the summer.

== Cast and characters ==
=== Starring ===
- KJ Apa as Archibald "Archie" Andrews
- Lili Reinhart as Elizabeth "Betty" Cooper
- Camila Mendes as Veronica Lodge
- Cole Sprouse as "Jughead" Jones III
- Marisol Nichols as Hermione Lodge
- Madelaine Petsch as Cheryl Blossom
- Ashleigh Murray as Josie McCoy
- Mädchen Amick as Alice Cooper
- Luke Perry as Frederick "Fred" Andrews

=== Guest starring ===
- Ross Butler as Reggie Mantle
- Casey Cott as Kevin Keller
- Sarah Habel as Miss Grundy
- Lochlyn Munro as Hal Cooper
- Asha Bromfield as Melody Valentine
- Hayley Law as Valerie Brown

=== Co-starring ===
- Nathalie Boltt as Penelope Blossom
- Barclay Hope as Clifford "Cliff" Blossom
- Cody Kearsley as Marmaduke "Moose" Mason
- Colin Lawrence as Coach Clayton
- Tom McBeath as Smithers
- Caitlin Mitchell-Markovitch as Ginger Lopez
- Olivia Ryan Stern as Tina Patel
- Alvin Sanders as Pop Tate
- Trevor Stines as Jason Blossom
- Daniel Yang as Dilton Doiley

== Production ==
=== Development ===
In 2013, Roberto Aguirre-Sacasa, the chief creative officer of Archie Comics, collaborated with Pitch Perfect director Jason Moore for a live-action coming-of-age film based on the Archie Comics universe. In their pitch to Warner Bros., studio executives suggested a more "high concept" project, creating a time travel plot in which Louis C.K. portrayed an older Archie. After the film deal fell through, Warner Bros. producer Sarah Schechter took a job working with Greg Berlanti, and asked Aguirre-Sacasa if he would be interested in making an Archie television series. On October 23, 2014, Deadline Hollywood reported that Fox had landed the project, with Berlanti producing. In July 2015, the project moved to The CW, who gave the series a pilot order on January 29, 2016. The project was pitched as a "subversive take" on the characters of Archie Comics.

=== Casting ===
On February 9, 2016, Lili Reinhart and Cole Sprouse were cast as Betty Cooper and Jughead Jones, respectively. After an extensive, four-month talent search, KJ Apa was cast as Archie Andrews on February 24, 2016. That same day, Luke Perry was cast as Archie's father, Fred Andrews, while Ashleigh Murray was cast as Josie McCoy, the lead singer of the popular band Josie and the Pussycats. Later that day, Madelaine Petsch was named to the role of Cheryl Blossom. Camila Mendes was the last of the main cast to join the series, being cast as Veronica Lodge on February 26. The Lodge family, who are written as Caucasian in the comics, were adapted as Latin Americans for Riverdale.

On March 3, 2016, Marisol Nichols joined the cast as Veronica's mother Hermione; the next day, Mädchen Amick was cast as Betty's mother Alice. Later that week, the supporting cast filled out with Ross Butler as Reggie Mantle, Daniel Yang as Dilton Doiley, and Cody Kearsley as Moose Mason. The last actor announced for the pilot was Casey Cott, portraying Kevin Keller, the first openly gay character in Archie Comics history.

=== Production design ===
Aguirre-Sacasa wanted the costuming and production to set the show's dark aesthetic, telling Vanity Fair, "people had so many preconceived ideas about what the show was going to be - that it would be light and frothy and bubblegum pink - that we knew we needed to take a big swing right out of the gate, to make something that was highly designed, highly curated." Multiple actors had to dye their hair for their roles. Reinhart and Sprouse, both natural dirty blondes, needed to dye their hair a lighter blonde and black, respectively. Apa, meanwhile, underwent the most intensive process to turn his naturally brunette hair red for Archie.

Hala Bahmet, who went on to work on This Is Us, served as costume designer for "The River's Edge". She worked with Aguirre-Sacasa to design each character's aesthetic, a combination of modern and vintage fashion. Bahmet worked with a knitter to design Jughead's beanie, which was designed with subtle points to reflect the whoopee cap that his character wears in the original comics.

=== Filming ===
Filming for the pilot took place between March 14 and March 31, 2016 in the Vancouver metropolitan area, with the exception of establishing shots of the town, which were filmed in Harbor Springs, Michigan. Scenes at Pop's Chock'lit Shoppe were filmed at Rocko's Family Diner in nearby Mission, British Columbia. The exterior facade of Riverdale High is Lord Byng Secondary School, while interior shots are filmed at a combination of different schools. Scenes at Sweetwater River were filmed around Alouette Lake in Golden Ears Provincial Park and Alice Lake Provincial Park. Petsch, who is afraid of open bodies of water, requested a stunt double for her opening scene on a boat, but ended up filming the scene herself, which she referred to as "great therapy".

== Music ==
The River's Edge (From Riverdale) – Single

Soundtrack album by Riverdale Cast
- Released: February 3, 2017
- Recorded: 2016
- Genre: Soundtrack
- Length: 9:02
- Label: WaterTower Music
- Producers: Leonard Jay Jackson; Ryan Petersen

Riverdale Cast chronology
The River's Edge (From Riverdale) – Single (2017)	Season 1 (Original Television Soundtrack) (2017)

Riverdale soundtracks chronology
The River's Edge (2017)	Season 1 (Original Television Soundtrack) (2017)

On February 3, 2017, WaterTower Music released a selection of music from the series' episode "The River's Edge" performed by cast members. All music was composed by Blake Neely.

Track listing
No.	Title	Performer(s)	Length
1.	"The Song That Everyone Sings"	KJ Apa	3:46
2.	"Fear Nothing"	Ashleigh Murray, Asha Bromfield, Hayley Law	2:39
3.	"All Through the Night"	Ashleigh Murray, Asha Bromfield, Hayley Law	2:37
Total length:			9:02

=== Songs not included on the soundtrack album ===
- "Number One" by Tove Styrke
- "Tell Me" by Johnny Jewel featuring Saoirse Ronan
- "I Took a Pill in Ibiza" by Mike Posner
- "Boyfriend" by Tegan and Sara
- "Laser Gun" by M83 featuring Mai Lan
- "Only" by RY X
- "Can't Get Enough of Myself" by Santigold featuring BC Unidos
- "No Stranger" by Small Black
- "No Surprise" by The Shacks, El Michels Affair
- "The Passenger" by Hunter As a Horse
- "Mustang Kids" by Zella Day

== Reception ==
=== Ratings ===
In the United States, the episode received a 0.5/2 percent share among adults between the ages of 18 and 49, meaning that it was seen by 0.5 percent of all households, and 2 percent of all of those watching television at the time of the broadcast. It was watched by 1.38 million viewers. With Live+7 DVR viewing factored in, the episode was watched by 2.38 million viewers and had an overall rating of 0.9 in the 18–49 demographic.

=== Critical response ===
Joshua Yehl at IGN rated the episode an 8.5 out of 10, stating, "An eerie, sharply-executed pilot gets Riverdale off to a strong start. A murder mystery ignites all sorts of drama inside a small town, turning colorful Archie comic characters into intriguing people with dark secrets. Visually, it's a moody and at times surreal feast for the eyes. The plot peels back layers of this twisted old town one at a time, and while it can feel a tad strange watching such liberties being taken with classic characters, it's all done with confidence and intent. It's as if the showmakers wore a devilish smile while crafting this show, knowing the audience would also be wearing one by the time the credits roll."

The A.V. Club's LaToya Ferguson gave the episode a "B+" and wrote, "As a pilot episode, "Chapter One: The River's Edge" does the job of making the audience want to sit and watch these characters on a weekly basis. It remains to be seen if it will live up to its many influences, but it certainly has a lot going for it from the start."

Giving the episode a 7.2 out of 10, Kyle Fowle of Paste stated: "In essence, "Chapter One: The River's Edge" doesn't exactly feel like a proper representation of what we'll get from a full season of Riverdale, as the procedural elements, such as the revelation that Archie and Ms. Grundy heard a gunshot in the woods the morning after their tryst, barely make themselves known here. That said, the premiere does a great job crafting a world that feels alive and unique. From the neon glow of the diner, to the outsized but nuanced characters".
