= Chapter 12 (disambiguation) =

Chapter 12, Title 11, United States Code is a component of United States bankruptcy laws.

Chapter Twelve, Chapter 12, or Chapter XII may also refer to:

== Television ==
- "Chapter 12" (Eastbound & Down)
- "Chapter 12" (House of Cards)
- "Chapter 12" (Legion)
- "Chapter 12" (Star Wars: Clone Wars), an episode of Star Wars: Clone Wars
- "Chapter 12: The Siege", an episode of The Mandalorian
- "Chapter Twelve" (Boston Public)
- "Chapter Twelve: Anatomy of a Murder", an episode of Riverdale
- "Chapter Twelve: Chain of Fools", an episode of Katy Keene
- "Chapter Twelve: The Epiphany", an episode of Chilling Adventures of Sabrina

== Other uses ==
- Chapter XII of the United Nations Charter
