= Shavonne Wong =

Singaporean artist (born 1990)

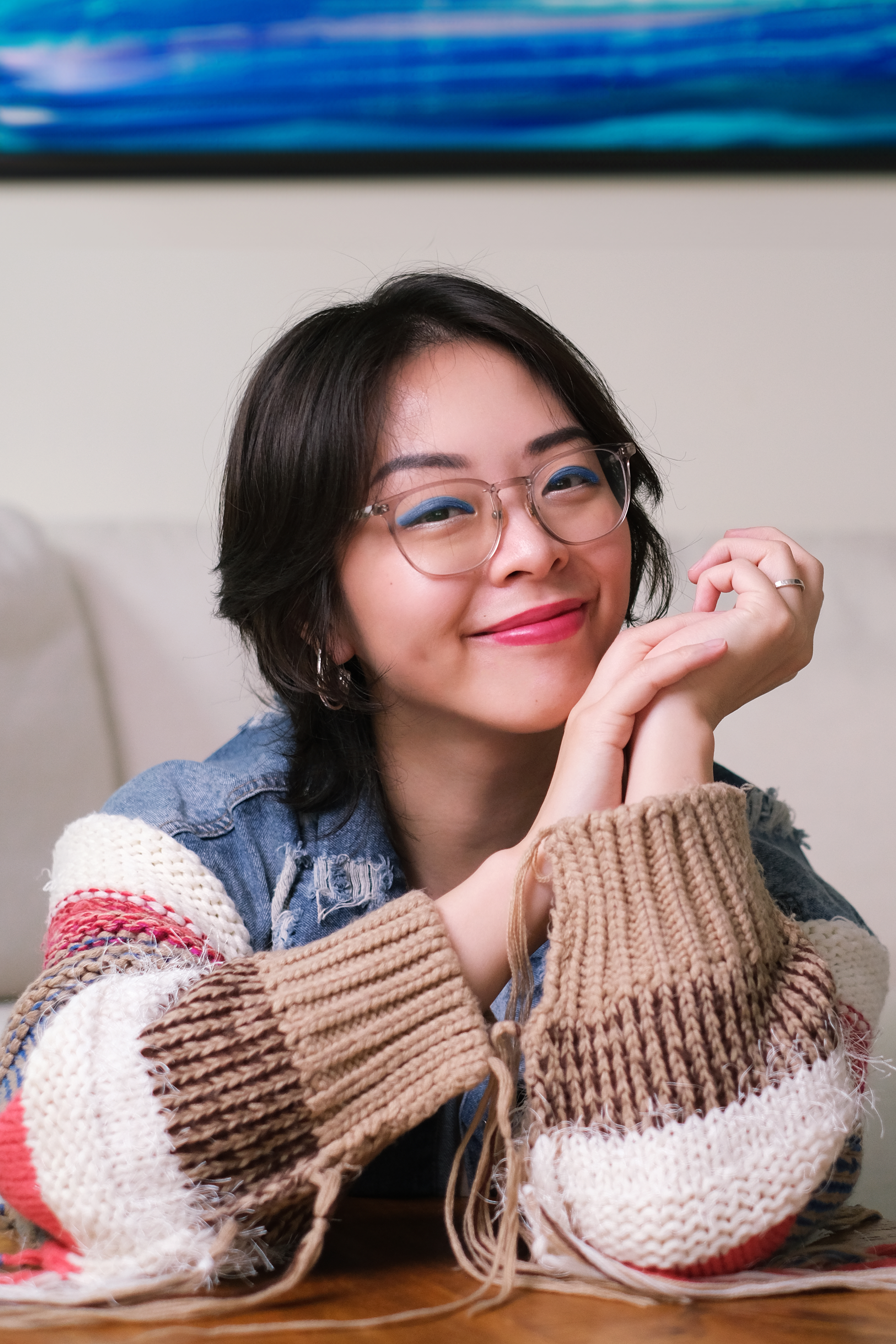
- Born: 1990 (age 35–36); Singapore
- Citizenship: Singapore
- Education: Temasek Polytechnic
- Known for: New media art, 3D computer graphics, artificial intelligence art, fashion photography
- Notable work: Love is Love (2021); Meet Eva Here (2024)
- Website: shavonnewong.art

Shavonne Wong (born 1990) is a Singaporean new media artist working with 3D and AI. Her work examines identity, representation, and the role of AI in human experience.

== Early life and education ==
Wong was born in 1990 in Singapore. She attended Temasek Polytechnic, where she graduated with a diploma in information technology.

In 2014, she undertook a month-long residency at the School of Visual Arts in New York City.

== Career ==
=== Photography ===
Wong began working professionally as a photographer in the early 2010s. In 2010, she co-founded Zhiffy Photography, a Singapore-based photography studio. As a photographer, she shot for Cosmopolitan Hong Kong, Glamour South Africa, Marie Claire, Vogue, and photographed subjects such as the actors Billy Porter and Rob Raco.

Wong was a returning guest photographer on Asia's Next Top Model, and developed a photo-video hybrid format she called "living stills", or animated still images.

=== Virtual models, NFTs, and digital art ===
When COVID-19 restrictions halted conventional shoots, Wong taught herself Blender and began sculpting digital humans that emphasise diverse Asian features as a new media artist and 3-D virtual model creator. The experiments grew into Gen V Agency, launched in August 2020, which supplies virtual models. In 2020, she was also included in the Forbes 30 Under 30 Asia list in the arts category. In 2021, Wong began selling her work as NFTs. In March 2021, she co-founded NFT Asia, a non-profit group supporting web3 artists across the region. In September 2021, Wong and Dutch digital fashion house, The Fabricant, created Vogue Singapore's first NFT magazine cover, The RenaiXance Rising.

Her first collection, "Love is Love," was released in November 2021 and consisted of 500 pieces themed around different types of relationships. The collection sold out within an hour, and actor Idris Elba later acquired three works on the secondary market. A related single work, The Kiss, was later shown at the 59th Venice Biennale as part of the Cameroon Pavilion, the Biennale's first pavilion to include an NFT exhibition.

In 2022, Wong worked with Lenne Chai on By Proxy, overlaying her virtual avatars onto Chai's photographs of Singapore neighbourhoods to evoke childhood memories. In 2023, Wong presented her first solo exhibition, The Ties That Bind, at Singapore's UltraSuperNew Gallery, where from 18 to 31 March she presented interactive augmented reality installations and dynamic NFT works that invited reflection on human connection. Her work has additionally been shown on public screens at Times Square in New York and Shibuya Crossing in Tokyo, and she contributed to Time's TIMEPieces NFT programme.

Wong's digital works have also been shown at the Art Dubai (2022), SEA Focus, Singapore (2022), and Paris Photo (2025). She also collaborated with Marie Claire Arabia in 2023 and created 3D art models of Arab women which were exhibited in Paris.

=== Artificial intelligence and installation work ===
In 2024, Wong debuted Meet Eva Here, an interactive installation built around a conversational AI companion named "Eva." It premiered in the ArtScience Museum Singapore, then was later shown in ART SG 2025 and Taipei Dangdai 2025. There was also a performance lecture about it at Art Central 2025 (HK). Later, Wong's solo exhibition EVA was exhibited at The Columns Gallery, Singapore. The same year her work was shown at Taipei Dangdai and Art Central in Hong Kong, and The Bubble We Call Home, a six-minute looping video on the tensions of growing up in Singapore, was included in Artist's Proof: Singapore at 60 at ARTSPACE@HeluTrans from 13 July to 17 August 2025. Also, in 2025, she worked with Shu Uemura to create the first phygital collection.

In November 2025, Wong presented After Ophelia at Artverse Gallery in Paris, a two-part installation reinterpreting Ophelia from Shakespeare's Hamlet. Ophelia, Retold uses an AI-generated voice to read a collage of four centuries of commentary on the character, drawing on Shakespearean text, feminist criticism and Reddit posts. Ophelia, Reassembled is a single-channel video that distorts and reconstructs her likeness using 3D and AI tools, while deliberately retaining visible digital artefacts.
