= The Amityville Terror =

- Film poster
- Directed by: Michael Angelo
- Written by: Amanda Barton
- Produced by: Justin Jones; Philip J Day; Zeus Zamani
- Starring: Nicole Tompkins; Kaiwi Lyman-Mersereau; Kim Nielsen; Amanda Barton; Trevor Stines; Christy St. John
- Cinematography: Michael S. Ojeda
- Edited by: Michael S. Ojeda
- Music by: Darren Morze
- Production companies: AZ Film Studios; Marquis Productions; Master Key Productions; Thriller Films
- Distributed by: Uncork'd Entertainment
- Release date: 2 August 2016 (United States)
- Running time: 84 minutes
- Country: United States
- Language: English

The Amityville Terror is a 2016 American horror film directed by Michael Angelo, and written by Amanda Barton. It was released direct-to-video, and is the sixteenth film to be inspired by Jay Anson's 1977 novel The Amityville Horror. Nicole Tompkins stars as Hailey Jacobson, the daughter of a dysfunctional family that is terrorized by both evil spirits and malicious townspeople after moving into a haunted house in Amityville, New York.

== Plot ==
Jessica and Todd Jacobson, along with their teenage daughter Hailey and Todd’s troubled sister Shae, move into a haunted house in Amityville, New York. Shae has unknowingly purchased the house from property manager Delilah McAllister. Hailey quickly meets a local teen, Brett, and they develop a relationship. Hailey begins to be bullied by classmates Theresa, Sally, and Claire.

While in the bathtub, Shae feels a strange experience, as if her flesh was burning. Proving to be a hallucination, Shae's behavior continues to grow stranger. When relaying this peculiar behavior to Brett, Hailey is introduced to a story about a little boy who used to live in that house. The boy, named Jimmy Oberest, drowned his baby sister in acid before killing his parents.

Mike Arkos, Todd's mechanic boss, comes to visit, as he used to date Shae in college. He finds her hovering behind Jessica while holding a scalpel. After this encounter, Mike immediately goes to see Delilah begging her to spare Shae. Delilah refuses this. Later, Mike dies when Todd inadvertently starts a fire in the auto shop. During this, Jessica works in the garden, repeatedly cutting herself and covering her in blood.

Later on, Todd is seen at a bar. While there, Delilah appears and tries to seduce him. When Todd arrives home, he is strangely seduced by his wife, who is revealed to be Shae in a supernatural disguise. Hailey is introduced to Brett's friend Jenny Chan. Jenny is said to be psychic and reluctantly decides to help Hailey and her family by going to their house to cleanse it. Jenny is supernaturally attacked and thrown out an upstairs window as she does so.

Hailey finds her aunt Shae painting with a scalpel from a bag belonging to Dr. Willis R. Cranston. Upon researching Dr. Cranston, Hailey discovers that he disappeared in 2004. Hailey decides to track down David, Willis's brother, who informs Hailey that his brother bought the house from Delilah. Upon finding this out, Hailey breaks into Delilah's home. She finds a file cabinet full of folders with names of the families who had rented the Amityville property and disappeared. Delilah finds Hailey, the latter fleeing to the police station to call her father, telling him to get her mother and aunt and leave. Hailey also calls Brett, informing him about Delilah. Brett reveals that the little boy he was talking about prior, along with his family, practiced black magic in the house. They had opened a portal to Hell. Delilah is uncovered to be Jimmy Oberest's sister, who was not home at the time of Jimmy's murders. Hailey sees two men transporting Jenny's body, cutting her conversation with Brett short in order to follow. Back at the house Shae, fully possessed, attacks Jessica inside the house. Meanwhile, Theresa and her friends confront Brett, badgering him about helping Hailey and getting Jenny involved.

Hailey follows the two men, coming upon a makeshift graveyard. There she notices a marker that is reserved with the Jacobson name. Theresa and her friends confront Hailey, revealing the town's nature and its people. She explains that the townspeople must feed the house, or the evil spirit inside will come after them. Hailey attacks Theresa and her friends, killing one of them while Theresa kills the other for disloyalty. Taunting Hailey, Theresa reveals she has decapitated Brett, which infuriates Hailey. Hailey fights Theresa off, stabbing her and returning to the house. Once home, Hailey finds her parents butchered as Shae leaps to attack her. Shae and Hailey fight, the latter defending herself as she flees around the home. Hailey eventually fires an arrow into Shae's forehead, causing her to combust. This allows Hailey to flee the house.

In the epilogue, Delilah is seen showing the house to the Douglas family seen killed in the prologue scene.

== Cast ==
- Nicole Tompkins as Hailey Jacobson
- Kaiwi Lyman-Mersereau as Todd Jacobson
- Kim Nielsen as Jessica Jacobson
- Amanda Barton as Shae Jacobson
- Trevor Stines as Brett
- Christy St. John as Theresa
- Tonya Kay as Delilah McCallister
- Bobby Emprechtinger as Mike Arkos
- Lai-Ling Bernstein as Jenny Chan
- Klaudia Kaye as Karen
- Korey Knecht as Hank
- Sarah Lieving as Mrs. Taylor
- Cher Hubsher as Sally
- Priscilla Emprechtinger as Claire
- Jocelyn Saenz as Faith Douglas
- Tommy Nash as Ray Douglas
- Kingsley Knecht as Ben Douglas
- Philip J Day as David Cranston
- Julia Rae as Penny

== Release ==
Uncork'd Entertainment released The Amityville Terror on video on demand on August 2, 2016 and on DVD on October 4, 2016.

== Reception ==
Tex Hula ranked The Amityville Terror as the tenth best out of the twenty-one Amityville films that he reviewed for Ain't It Cool News, and succinctly stated, "Just as bland and generic as you can possibly get. Boring characters. Sub-plots are introduced and quickly forgotten. But surprisingly it has more gore, sex, and nudity than any other Amityville movie. Doesn't help though." Brandon Long of PopHorror was highly critical of The Amityville Terror, calling it "a generic knockoff of the original film" before concluding, "The one redeemable element to this film is a few brutally creative death scenes paired with Aunt Shae's deteriorating sanity." Kieran Fisher, in a review written for Scream magazine, was similarly contemptuous of the film, finding it to be "the epitome of generic and forgettable" and deeming it something, "I'd only recommend to diehard fans of the franchise."
