= Evan Wood =

- Directed by: Niki Byrne
- Starring: Charlotte Louise Spencer; Alex Sorian Brown; Trevor Stines
- Release date: 2021

Evan Wood is a 2021 film directed by Niki Byrne, starring Charlotte Louise Spencer, Alex Sorian Brown, Trevor Stines, Michael Parr, Amy Walker, and Jere Burns.

== Plot ==
Rachel, a writing student in Los Angeles, finds her life disrupted when she receives news of her grandmother’s passing. At the encouragement of a trusted professor, she goes home to process the family’s trauma through her writing. Her return has both healing and painful revelations: a romantic rekindling with an old love interest and, most notably, the challenge of helping her brother as he struggles with issues of mental health and addiction.

== Reception ==
Evan Wood had its world premiere at the 36th edition of the Santa Barbara International Film Festival (SBIFF) in 2021. It also had its LA premiere at Dances With Films:LA and was nominated as Best Indie Feature at the Sydney Women's International Film Festival.

Film Threat said that while the film "takes on the very big issue of drug addiction and those who are left dealing with it, it’s a bit underbaked. It lacks the emotional charge and backstory to grip the viewer for a story so many people know and understand on a personal level—'to live in grief and hope.'",".

Cinema Gavia rated the film 6.7/10, saying, "there is a lack of depth in its main theme, as it is a problem with several edges." but also mentioned ""It’s a good debut from Niki Byrne, who offers a film with an important message and a packaging that shows potential, which can continue to evolve smoothly in her upcoming films."
