= Holy Days (film) =

2026 Canadian-New Zealand film

- Theatrical release poster
- Directed by: Nat Boltt
- Written by: Nat Boltt
- Based on: Holy Days by Dame Joy Cowley
- Produced by: Roxi Bull; Victoria Dabbs; Sushant Desai; Michelle Morris; Emma Slade
- Starring: Judy Davis; Miriam Margolyes; Elijah Tamati; Jacki Weaver
- Cinematography: Thomas Burstyn
- Edited by: Carly Turner
- Music by: Karl Sölve Steven
- Production companies: Velvet Moss; Lily Pictures
- Distributed by: Photon Films (Canada); Kismet Movies; Rialto Distribution (New Zealand and Australia)
- Release dates: 5 February 2026 (Santa Barbara); 26 February 2026 (New Zealand); 27 March 2026 (North America)
- Running time: 101 minutes
- Countries: Canada; New Zealand
- Language: English
- Box office: $339,650

Holy Days is a 2026 comedy drama film directed and written by Nat Boltt, in her feature directorial debut. A Canadian-New Zealand co-production, the film features three elderly nuns, who are trying to save their convent, and an unhappy young boy, who embark on a road trip.

The film had its world premiere at the 41st Santa Barbara International Film Festival on 5 February 2026, which was followed by a Canadian premiere at the Kingston Canadian Film Festival on 26 February. It was theatrically released in New Zealand on 26 February, and was released in North America on 27 March.

== Cast ==
- Judy Davis as Sister Agnes
- Miriam Margolyes as Sister Luke
- Jacki Weaver as Sister Mary Clare
- Elijah Tamati as Brian Collins
- Craig Hall as Joe Collins
- John Bach as Bishop Chaytor

== Production ==
On November 1, 2024, Judy Davis, Miriam Margolyes, Jacki Weaver, and Elijah Tamati joined the cast of the film, directed and written by Nat Boltt, which is based on the novel of the same name by Dame Joy Cowley. Principal photography began on 11 November, taking place in Christchurch in Canterbury, Akaroa, and Aoraki. The Canadian-New Zealand co-production is produced by Velvet Moss and Lily Pictures. Emma Slade, Michelle Morris, Victoria Dabbs, Roxi Bull and Sushant Desai, along with Tainui Stephens, produced the film, with Micah Winiata and Eva Trebilco serving as associate producers. The film was made with financial support from the New Zealand Film Commission, New Zealand Screen Production Rebate, Telefilm Canada, Creative BC, CBC Films and Elemental Post.

== Release ==
In November 2024, worldwide sales to the film were acquired by Blue Fox Entertainment, which also handled the distribution in the United States. Kismet Movies handled distribution rights in Australia and New Zealand, while Photon Films handled the Canadian distribution. The film was screened for distributors in the Industry Selects program at the 2025 Toronto International Film Festival on September 5, 2025. The film had its world premiere at the 41st Santa Barbara International Film Festival on 5 February 2026, which was followed by a Canadian premiere at the Kingston Canadian Film Festival on 26 February.

It was released theatrically in New Zealand on 26 February. The film was also released in North America on 27 March, and was released in Australia on 6 August.

== Reception ==
On the review aggregator website Rotten Tomatoes, 62% of 21 critics' reviews are positive, with an average rating of 6.3/10.

Sheila O'Malley of RogerEbert.com gave the film two out of four stars and wrote, "Holy Days depends on an audience finding nuns funny, especially when they drive cars, crack jokes, or throw back a glass of wine. As someone with two nuns in my family, I do not find the mere existence of nuns living their lives in the modern world inherently humorous."
