= Lee Toland Krieger =

American film director and screenwriter (born 1983)

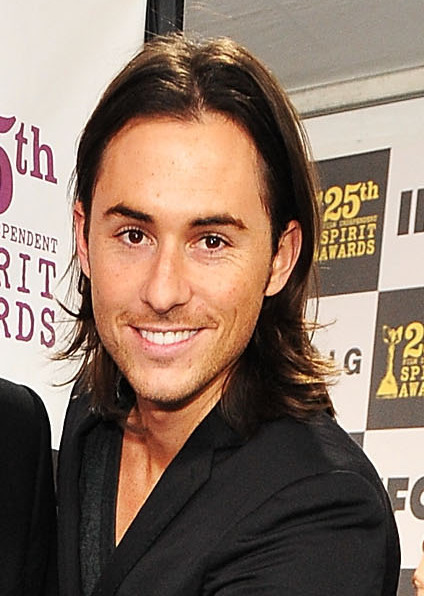
- Krieger in 2010
- Born: January 24, 1983 (age 43); Los Angeles, California, U.S.
- Occupations: Film director, screenwriter
- Years active: 2004–present

Lee Toland Krieger (born January 24, 1983) is an American film director and screenwriter best known for the films The Vicious Kind (2009), Celeste and Jesse Forever (2012) and The Age of Adaline (2015).

== Early life ==
Krieger was born and raised in Los Angeles. He became "hooked" on filmmaking at the age of 13 when his neighbor, film producer Steve Perry, brought him to the set of the 1996 film Executive Decision. Krieger later interned for Perry during high school, and in college he worked for Neil LaBute and his producing partner Gail Mutrux. He graduated from the University of Southern California's School of Cinema and Television in 2005.

== Career ==
Krieger founded a production company, Autumn Entertainment, in 2004, under which his first project was December Ends, a feature film shot on a US$75,000 budget. The film premiered at the 2006 Method Fest, two years after it was shot, where it won the festival's Best Picture award.

In 2009, Krieger wrote and directed The Vicious Kind, which premiered at the 2009 Sundance Film Festival and earned him numerous accolades including the Emerging Filmmaker Award at the Denver Film Festival and an Independent Spirit Award nomination for Best Screenplay. He was later asked by producer Jennifer Todd to direct Celeste and Jesse Forever, based on a script written by Rashida Jones and Will McCormack, which would also premiere at the Sundance Film Festival in 2012. After the success of Celeste and Jesse Forever, he received offers to direct similar scripts, but turned them down in lieu of writing his own material for future projects.

He has also directed many commercials with clients such as Joseph Abboud and AG Jeans, and music videos for Universal Music Group and the Island Def Jam Music Group.

He directed The Age of Adaline, starring Blake Lively and Michiel Huisman. Production started in March 2014, and the film was released in April 2015.

On September 19, 2012, Lionsgate acquired the rights to the script Vanish Man written by Denison Hatch. Later in February 2015, Krieger was set to rewrite and direct the film, which 21 Laps Entertainment would produce.

On February 29, 2016, it was announced that Krieger would direct The Divergent Series: Ascendant, the final film in The Divergent Series. On July 20, 2016, it was announced that the project was put on hold due to Lionsgate's decision to release the final film as a TV movie, mainly because of the third film in the series, Allegiant, underperforming. In December 2018, it was announced that the television movie has been cancelled due to the lack of interest of the cast and network executives.

In August 2022, it was announced that Krieger would executive produce and direct episodes of the show Dead Boy Detectives for Netflix.

In July 2025, after an absence of ten years, it was announced that Krieger will direct the romantic comedy film, Just Picture It, with Millie Bobby Brown and Gabriel LaBelle.

== Personal life ==
Krieger currently lives in Los Angeles. He is the grandson of actor Lee Krieger.

== Filmography ==
Film

Year	Title	Director	Writer	Producer	Notes
2006	December Ends	Yes	Yes	Yes	Role: Jean-Luc (uncredited)
2009	The Vicious Kind	Yes	Yes	Yes	
2012	Celeste and Jesse Forever	Yes	No	No	
2015	The Age of Adaline	Yes	No	No	
TBA	Just Picture It	Yes	No	No	Filming

Short film

Year	Title	Director	Writer	Producer	Notes
2008	The Nature of Space & Time	Yes	Yes	Yes	Also Still Photographer
2012	Denise	Yes	No	No	
2012	Modern/Love	Yes	Yes	Yes	Also editor

Television

Year	Title	Director	Executive Producer	Episode(s) directed
2014	Happyland	Yes	No	"Pilot"
2017	Beyond	Yes	No	"Pilot"
2017	Riverdale	Yes	No	"Chapter One: The River's Edge"
2017	Riverdale	Yes	No	"Chapter Two: A Touch of Evil"
2017	Riverdale	Yes	No	"Chapter Three: Body Double"
2017	Riverdale	Yes	No	"Chapter Thirteen: The Sweet Hereafter"
2018	Life Sentence	Yes	No	"Pilot"
2018	You	Yes	Yes	"Pilot"
2018	You	Yes	Yes	"The Last Nice Guy In New York"
2018	Chilling Adventures of Sabrina	Yes	Yes	"Chapter One: October Country"
2018	Chilling Adventures of Sabrina	Yes	Yes	"Chapter Two: The Dark Baptism"
2019	Deadly Class	Yes	Yes	"Reagan Youth"
2019	Prodigal Son	Yes	Yes	"Pilot"
2021	Superman & Lois	Yes	Yes	"Pilot"
2021	Superman & Lois	Yes	Yes	"Heritage"
2021	Shadow and Bone	Yes	Yes	"A Searing Burst of Light"
2021	Shadow and Bone	Yes	Yes	"We're All Someone's Monster"
2024	Dead Boy Detectives	Yes	Yes	"The Case of Crystal Palace"
2024	Brilliant Minds	Yes	Yes	"Pilot"
2024	Brilliant Minds	Yes	Yes	"The Disembodied Woman"
2025	You	Yes	No	"Finale"
