= Rob Raco =

Canadian actor and model

- Born: Robert Joseph Raco; November 26, 1989 (age 36); Windsor, Ontario, Canada
- Occupations: Actor; Musician
- Years active: 2013–present
- Notable work: Riverdale

Robert Joseph Raco (born November 26, 1989) is a Canadian actor and musician. He is known for his role as Joaquin DeSantos in The CW teen drama series Riverdale (2017–2018). Raco also appeared in The CW fantasy drama series Supernatural (2017), the Fox action comedy series Lethal Weapon (2019), and the Netflix sketch comedy series I Think You Should Leave with Tim Robinson (2019).

== Personal life ==
Raco was born on November 26, 1989, in Windsor, Ontario, Canada.

He the co-owner of Essex County Drums, a custom drum manufacturer based in the Windsor, Ontario area, that he and his father started in 2005.

== Filmography ==
=== Film ===
Year	Title	Role	Notes
2013	Second Chances	Party Goer #1	Short film
2013	No Scratches	Leader	Short film
2014	Beyond the Lights	Stage Manager	Uncredited
2015	Throb	Casey	Short film
2015	The Snow Men	James	Short film
2015	Ted 2	Kissing Couple	Uncredited
2016	Drowning	Marcus	Short film
2016	Peaks & Valleys	Rob	Short film
2016	Glass Doors	John	Short film
2016	Occulta Metu	Bradley	Short film
2017	Wasted Bliss	Trevor	Short film
2019	A Story	Jacob	Short film
2019	A Beauty & the Beast Christmas	Derek	
2020	Archons	Eric Patrick	
2024	A Hundred Lies	Ricky	
2024	Art of a Hit	Miles	

=== Television ===
Year	Title	Role	Notes
2017	Supernatural	Clark Barker	Episode: "Lost and Found"
2017–2018	Riverdale	Joaquin DeSantos	10 episodes
2019	Lethal Weapon	Parker Adams	Episode: "The Roger and Me"
2019	I Think You Should Leave with Tim Robinson	Brandon	Episode: "Thanks for Thinking They Are Cool"
2025	FBI	Sonny Grippo	Episode: "Lineage"

=== Music videos ===
Year	Title	Artist	Role
2019	"Think About You"	Valerie Broussard & Kygo	Mysterious Man
2023	"The Valley"	Laura Marano	Prom Date
