= Tiera Skovbye =

Canadian actress (born 1994)

- Born: May 6, 1994 (age 32); Vancouver, British Columbia, Canada
- Occupation: Actress
- Years active: 2005–present

Tiera Skovbye (/ˈskoʊbi/ SKOH-bee; born May 6, 1994) is a Canadian actress. She began her career as a child actress. She is known for starring in television films such as her role playing Elizabeth Berkley in Lifetime's The Unauthorized Saved by the Bell Story; for her recurring roles as Polly Cooper on The CW series Riverdale, as Robin on the ABC television series Once Upon a Time. Skovbye starred as Grace Knight on the Global series Nurses.

== Career ==
Skovbye's first substantial role was as the 10-year-old Jane on the drama series Painkiller Jane in 2007. Skovbye has also appeared in a number of television films, most notably Lifetime's The Unauthorized Saved by the Bell Story in which she played Elizabeth Berkley.

In early 2017, she began playing the recurring role of Polly Cooper on The CW teen drama series Riverdale. Skovbye played the recurring role of Robin, the daughter of Zelena and Robin Hood, and her cursed counterpart, Margot, during the seventh season of Once Upon a Time. In 2018, she appeared in the horror mystery film Summer of 84, opposite Graham Verchere, Judah Lewis, and Rich Sommer.

Skovbye starred as Grace Knight on the Global drama series Nurses, which ran from 2020 to 2021.

== Personal life ==
Skovbye was born in Vancouver, British Columbia. She has a younger sister, Ali, who is also an actress, and who co-stars on the Netflix series Firefly Lane.

== Filmography ==
=== Film ===
Year	Title	Role	Notes
2012	Girl in Progress	Jezabel	as Tiere Skovkye
2012	A Christmas Story 2	Drucilla Gootrad	Direct-to-video film
2015	Even Lambs Have Teeth	Katie	
2018	Summer of '84	Nikki Kaszuba	
2018	Midnight Sun	Zoe Carmichael	
2018	The Miracle Season	Brie	
2020	2 Hearts	Samantha "Sam" Peters	
2022	Bring It On: Cheer or Die	McKayla Miller	Direct-to-video film

=== Television ===
Year	Title	Role	Notes
2007	Painkiller Jane	Jane – 10 Years Old	3 episodes
2007	Kaya	Real Shandi Palmer	Episode: "Every Breath You Take"
2008, 2013	Supernatural	Young Bela / Honor	Episodes: "Time Is on My Side", "Rock and a Hard Place"
2010	The Troop	Darla Robinson	Episode: "Double Felix"
2010	Dead Lines	Spencer Fyne	Television movie
2010	Wishing Well	Sam Turner	Unsold television pilot; also known as Wish List
2010, 2013	The Haunting Hour: The Series	Anna	Episodes: "The Dead Body", "Dead Bodies"
2011	Three Weeks, Three Kids	Alice Norton	Television movie (Hallmark)
2012	Wingin' It	Sarah	Episode: "Practical Romance"
2012	The Haunting Hour: The Series	Flynn	Episode: "Headshot"
2013	Blink	Mia	Unsold television pilot
2013	Forever 16	Raven	Television movie (Lifetime)
2013	Spooksville	Daniela	Episode: "The Wicked Cat"
2014	The Unauthorized Saved by the Bell Story	Elizabeth Berkley	Television movie (Lifetime)
2014	Christmas Icetastrophe	Marley Crooge	Television movie (Syfy)
2014	A Christmas Tail	Olivia Burgin	Television movie
2015	Sugar Babies	Tessa Bouillette	Television movie (Lifetime)
2015	Liar, Liar, Vampire	Caitlyn Crisp	Television movie (Nickelodeon)
2015	Arrow	Madison Danforth	Episode: "The Candidate"
2015	Minority Report	Young Agatha	Episode: "The American Dream"
2015	Mark & Russell's Wild Ride	Ashley	Television movie (Disney XD)
2016	Revenge Porn	Peyton Harris	Television movie (Lifetime); also known as My Daughter's Disgrace
2016	Dead of Summer	Deb (20 years old)	Episode: "The Dharma Bums"
2016	Christmas Cookies	Brooke	Television movie (Hallmark)
2017–2023	Riverdale	Polly Cooper	Recurring role
2017	Secrets of My Stepdaughter	Rachel Kent	Television movie (Lifetime)
2017	One Small Indiscretion	Elle	Television movie (Lifetime)
2017–2018	Once Upon a Time	Margot / Robin	Recurring role (season 7)
2020–2021	Nurses	Grace	Main role
2020	Dirty John	Young Betty Broderick	3 episodes (season 2)
2023	Ride	Missy McMurray	Main role

=== Music videos ===
- "Vessel" (2019) by Royal
