= Peter James Bryant =

American actor

- Occupation: Actor
- Years active: 1989–present

Peter James Bryant is an American actor best known for his television series roles as Bling in Dark Angel (2000–2001), Waldo Weatherbee in Riverdale (2017–2023) and Phillip Sterling in Family Law (2021–2026).

== Filmography ==
=== Film ===
Year	Title	Role	Notes
1995	Jumanji	Paramedic	
1998	Nightmare Street	Eddie	
1999	Mr. Rice's Secret	Umpire	
2000	Trixie	Cop #1	
2000	Scary Movie	TV Reporter	
2001	3000 Miles to Graceland	Tom Matthews	
2001	See Spot Run	Cop #1	
2001	Out of Line	Bodyguard	
2001	Touched by a Killer	Warren Penn	
2004	Shelf Life	Bill	
2005	White Noise	Man (EVP)	
2005	Assault on Precinct 13	Lt. Holloway	
2005	Fantastic Four	Lame Joke Businessman	
2005	Underclassman	Michael Barry	
2007	Martian Child	Policeman at School	
2009	Possession	Detective Mills	
2011	Sucker Punch	Guard / Chauffeur #2	
2011	Tactical Force	Chief	
2012	The Package	Ralph	
2013	Metallica: Through the Never	Car Crash Man	
2019	Phil	Cop	
2020	Sonic the Hedgehog	Army Chief of Staff	
2022	White Dog	Red	
2024	Just in Time	Franklin	
2024	Longlegs	Senior FBI Agent	

=== Television ===
Year	Title	Role	Notes
1989–1996	G.P.	Dr. Chris Wright	Australian TV series
1994, 1995	Highlander	Orderly / Cop	2 episodes
1995	University Hospital	The Police Officer	Episode: "Secrets Great and Small"
1995	Deadlocked: Escape from Zone 14	Head Prison Guard	TV movie
1995	The Omen	Soldier #2	TV movie
1995	Strange Luck	Movie Cop	Episode: "She Was"
1995	The Marshal	SOG Commander	Episode: "Land of Opportunity"
1996	The Commish	Officer Hightower	Episode: "Redemption"
1996	Generation X	Sergeant Cruller	TV movie
1996	The Sentinel	Check-in Guard	Episode: "Second Chance"
1996, 1997	Millennium	Officer Riley / Editor	2 episodes
1996, 1998	Poltergeist: The Legacy	Sgt. Mapes / Colonel Frank Rollins	2 episodes
1996, 1997, 1999	The Outer Limits	Geoff / Mike / Commander Sullivan	3 episodes
1997	Touched By Evil	Elroy	TV movie
1997	The X-Files	Uniformed Cop	Episode: "Leonard Betts"
1997	Hostile Force	Fastmart Manager	TV movie
1997	Our Mother's Murder	Booking Officer	TV movie
1997	The Advocate's Devil	Marco	TV movie
1997	Honey, I Shrunk the Kids	Lester	Episode: "Honey, We're Stuck in the 70's"
1997	Medusa's Child	FAA Instructor	TV movie
1998	Outrage	Street Officer	TV movie
1998	The Hunted	Officer	TV movie
1998	Viper	Fred Solaro	Episode: "Trust No One"
1998	The Long Way Home	Trooper	TV movie
1998	Sleepwalkers	Dick Hickock	Episode: "Passed Imperfect"
1998	The Net	Police Officer / Eric	2 episodes
1998	The Inspectors	Inspector Davis	TV movie
1998	Max Q: Emergency Landing	John Daniels	TV movie
1998	First Wave	Moody	Episode: "Second Wave"
1998, 2004	Stargate SG-1	Fro'tak / Hoskins	3 episodes
1999	Behind the Mask	Brian's Colleague	TV movie
1999	Fatal Error	Kemper	TV movie
1999	The Crow: Stairway to Heaven	Warren Markwell	Episode: "Lazarus Rising"
1999	So Weird	Clayton	Episode: "Mutiny"
1999	Aftershock: Earthquake in New York	Mayor's Aide Joseph	2 episodes
1999	Y2K	Bank Security Guard	TV movie
1999	Seven Days	Agent Swain	Episode: "The Collector"
1999–2000	Nothing Too Good for a Cowboy	Robert McDaniels	4 episodes
2000–2001	Dark Angel	Bling	14 episodes
2001	The Lone Gunmen	Sergeant	Episode: "Planet of the Frohikes"
2001	Hostage Negotiator	Darrell Walker	TV movie
2001	Bratty Babies	Agent Smith	TV movie
2001	Special Unit 2	Connolly	Episode: "The Eve"
2001	UC: Undercover	SWAT Cop #2	Episode: "Zero Option"
2002	John Doe	Paramedic	Episode: "Pilot"
2002	Saint Sinner	Officer #2	TV movie
2002	Taken	Tech on Monitors	2 episodes
2003	Cold Squad	Agt. Julian Mitchell	Episode: "Killing Time"
2003	The Twilight Zone	Principal Kerr	Episode: "Into the Light"
2003	Andromeda	Marshal Orac	Episode: "The Right Horse"
2003	First to Die	McBride	TV movie
2003	Dead Like Me	Train Porter	Episode: "Pilot"
2003	Romeo!	Rosco	Episode: "Man of the Hizzouse"
2003	Devil Winds	David Lincoln	TV movie
2005	Behind the Camera: The Unauthorized Story of Mork & Mindy	Detective	TV movie
2005	Masters of Horror	Detective #1	Episode: "Chocolate"
2006	Black Widower	Michell	TV movie
2006	The 4400	Agent Wood	Episode: "The New World"
2006	The Dead Zone	Jacob Frankel	Episode: "Vortex"
2006	My Silent Partner	Dietrich	TV movie
2007	Termination Point	Co-Pilot	TV movie
2007	Stolen Innocence	Detective Reese	TV movie
2007	The L Word	Major Dixon	Episode: "Literary License to Kill"
2007	Judicial Indiscretion	Attorney	TV movie
2007	Masters of Science Fiction	Dr. Gavin	Episode: "A Clean Escape"
2007	Whistler	Chase	Episode: "Homecoming"
2007	Smallville	Lex's Assistant	2 episodes
2007	Battlestar Galactica: Razor	Frank Bruno	TV movie
2007	Intelligence	Dave Baker	4 episodes
2008	The Guard	D Ops	Episode: "Zero Footprint"
2008	Sanctuary	Cabal Team Leader	2 episodes
2009	Knights of Bloodsteel	Swope	2 episodes
2009	Supernatural	Deputy Walt Framingham	Episode: "Free To Be You and Me"
2010	Human Target	Abbot Stevens	Episode: "Sanctuary"
2010	Fringe	Ben McCalister	Episode: "The Man from the Other Side"
2010	Seduced by Lies	Detective Brooking	TV movie
2011	V	Neil Stern	Episode: "Concordia"
2011	The Killing	Imam Gelabi	2 episodes
2011	Gone	Dennis Baldwin	TV movie
2011	Obsession	Detective Arnold	TV movie
2011	Once Upon a Time	Jailer	Episode: "Pilot"
2012	Copper	Marcus Freeman	3 episodes
2013	Psych	FBI Agent	Episode: "No Country for Two Old Men"
2013	Bates Motel	Doctor Levine	Episode: "What's Wrong with Norman"
2013	Profile for Murder	Captain Bailey	TV movie
2013	Secret Liaison	Judge M. Avery	TV movie
2013	Forever 16	Captain Gibson	TV movie
2013–2014	Spooksville	Moorpark	6 episodes
2014	Intelligence	DNI Carl Russell	Episode: "Pilot"
2014	Happy Face Killer	Agent Philip Kuttner	TV movie
2014	Continuum	Mr. Towey	2 episodes
2014	Stolen from the Womb	Dr. Beldon	TV movie
2014	Intruders	George Brackett	2 episodes
2014	Gracepoint	Len Denvers	Episode #1.1
2015	Arrow	Alderman Richard Ford	Episode: "Midnight City"
2015	The Flash	Fire Chief	Episode: "The Trap"
2015	A Country Wedding	Stan	TV movie
2015	The Whispers	Specialist	Episode: "Game Over"
2015	Mother of All Lies	Sheriff Winters	TV movie
2015	My One Christmas Wish	Michael	TV movie
2015	Minority Report	Elgin Glasser	Episode: "Everybody Runs"
2016	Legends of Tomorrow	Declan	2 episodes
2016	Aftermath	Dr. Rawlins	3 episodes
2016–2017	Hailey Dean Mysteries	Captain Randy Quinn / Lt. Randall Quinn	2 episodes
2017	Rogue	Captain F. Sleader	8 episodes
2017	Garage Sale Mystery	Thad	Episode: "The Beach Murder"
2017–2023	Riverdale	Waldo Weatherbee	44 episodes
2018	Taken	Norman	Episode: "Hammurabi"
2018	Insomnia	Victor	8 episodes
2019	Emma Fielding Mysteries	Dean Hawkins	Episode: "More Bitter Than Death"
2019	The Murders	Cole Solomon	Episode: "In My Feelings"
2019	In the Key of Love	Mayor McCready	TV movie
2019	See	Lord Dune	4 episodes
2019	The Good Doctor	Art's Doctor	Episode: "Friends and Family"
2020	Mystery 101	Howard Clausen	Episode: "An Education in Murder"
2020	A Christmas Tree Grows in Colorado	Raymond	TV movie
2021	Van Helsing	Vice President Eli Newton	4 episodes
2021	The Santa Stakeout	Captain Fletcher	TV movie
2021–2026	Family Law	Phillip Sterling	9 episodes
2022	Upload	Pastor Rob	3 episodes
2022	Always Amore	Richard	TV movie
2022	Wrath: A Seven Deadly Sins Story	Victor Jeffries	TV movie
2022	Heart of the Matter	Dr. Fisher	TV movie
2022	Fire Country	Sheriff Greg Dunning	Episode: "Where There's Smoke..."
2022	All Saints Christmas	Abner Toussaint	TV movie
2023	The Irrational	Dominic	Episode: "Lucky Charms"
2024	Tracker	Gilroy	Episode: "Mt. Shasta"
2024	Alert: Missing Persons Unit	Coach Bud Bingham	Episode: "Alexi"
