= Families of Archie's Gang =

The following is a list of members of the families of Archie's Gang appearing in Archie Comics. Primarily featured are the parents of Archie Andrews, Betty Cooper, Veronica Lodge and Jughead Jones.

== The Andrews family ==
=== Fred Andrews ===
Frederick "Fred" Andrews is the father of Archie Andrews and the son of Archie's grandfather Artie Andrews. Apart from Hiram Lodge, he and his wife Mary appear more in the comics than any other parents in Archie Comics. Archie often calls him "Pop." He was somewhat overweight, and his wife often makes him go on a diet, which he dislikes. He has also lost most of his black hair. Thinning-haired, amply-contoured gentlemen appear to be common in Archie Comics (Mr. Weatherbee, Coach Kleats, Smithers, Pop Tate).

He works as a businessman. Although the specifics of his job are not clear, it involves an aspect of industrial automotive sales. He sometimes claims to have more skills than he has. He was conservative, has old-fashioned ideals, and is bothered by the changes in the new generation, which he must endure due to his having a teenage son. However, beneath this lies a very soft heart and he occasionally displays a sense of humor towards Archie. The two of them are close and share many father/son activities. He was portrayed by Luke Perry in the CW series Riverdale. In the show, he was at first disapproving of Archie's interest in music instead of sports, but soon learned to accept it.

Luke Perry died of a stroke in March 2019 and as a result of his death, Fred was killed off-screen by a speeding car while helping someone else who had a flat tire.

=== Mary Andrews ===
Mary Andrews is a middle-aged, pleasant-mannered, red-haired woman and Archie's typical American suburban mother. In earlier years, she was portrayed with white hair and a plump figure, but given a more youthful appearance in later years as with most of the parents of the Archie characters.

Though her husband Fred was the breadwinner in earlier decades, she took a job at a real estate agency in later years. She is often the only one who can keep order among the family. Still, she is more tolerant than her husband, and she and Archie have a typical mother/son relationship. Although she is a disciplinarian and her son is always getting into trouble, she never seems to lose her temper with him. Molly Ringwald portrays Mary in the CW series Riverdale. This version of the character is separated from Fred and resides in Chicago.

=== Artie Andrews ===
Archie's paternal grandfather appeared sporadically for years before receiving the name Artie Andrews. Sometimes his hair is white, sometimes it is orange, and sometimes it has only partly lost its color. However, his hair almost always has the same crisscross pattern as Archie (which Archie's father oddly lacks). He got his name in Archie Digest #239 in October 2007. Mr. Lodge showed him and Archie a classic car that looked like Archie's original jalopy. It was the car Artie had as a teenager when he looked and dressed like Archie from the 1940s. His girlfriend (and eventual wife) Bernice was nearly identical to Betty as a teenager, so when Artie said he married her, Veronica was displeased. His best friend as a teenager was Curly, who looked a lot like Jughead. In Riverdale, he died in Fred's junior year as shown in a flashback episode.

=== Spotty ===
Spotty is Little Archie's brown dog with black spots. He appeared primarily in "Little Archie", as an honorary member of the gang, so he has been known to tag along with them on their adventures. He has a close relationship with Little Archie, who often worries about him being in danger.

Spotty has made a few appearances in the main continuity, usually shown as an older, less active dog. His most recent appearance in mainstream continuity was Archie's Double Digest #196 in 2009.

=== Vegas ===
Archie is featured with his dog, Vegas, in several Archie Comics issues. Vegas is a caramel-colored pup with a red collar.

== The Cooper family ==
=== Hal Cooper ===
In the first Archie appearance (Pep Comics #22, December 1941), Betty's father is called J. B. Cooper. In one frame, he calls a portrait of his to be "in Lodge uniform". This implies that he belonged to a fraternal order (like the Masons); later in the same story, he is shown to be present when a high-wire act in which Archie was involved goes wrong. He is shown wearing said lodge uniform. J. B. Cooper is also shown to be quite a bit older than his later avatars.

In later stories, Betty's father is shown working as a druggist and is called Hal Cooper. Although he has only a middle-class income, he is a good provider for his family. He is also a highly respected citizen, very civic-minded, and serves on the town council. He is a somewhat rotund fellow and, for a time, his hair was white and thinning. By the 1990s, he was given light brown hair with early signs of baldness. In some early stories he was seen smoking a pipe, but it has been deleted where such stories have been reprinted.

He once believed in gender stereotypes, but in later years, he and Betty are seen sharing many activities, and he appears to be the one who introduced her to sports. Though he is sometimes frustrated with his daughter's antics, such as her obsession with Archie, he loves her very much and is proud of her achievements. Even so, he is often perplexed by the female nature, especially since his son Chic moved out and he became the only male in the Cooper household. He doesn't approve of Archie's occasional inconsideration of Betty's feelings.

Lochlyn Munro portrays Hal in the TV series Riverdale. While he is initially portrayed as a respectable, civic-minded family provider, he is later revealed to be a controlling, vengeful persona. In the Season 1 finale, it is revealed that Hal made his then-girlfriend Alice give up her baby son for adoption while they were in high school. He has a long-standing hatred for the Blossom family, which he says is because his grandfather was murdered by a member of the Blossom family and the Blossoms stole the maple syrup business away from the Cooper family. He is enraged when his daughter Polly starts dating the Blossom's eldest son, Jason. When Polly becomes pregnant and Jason is murdered, he sends Polly to the Sisters of Quiet Mercy and blames Polly's departure on a mental breakdown spawned by Jason's abusive nature. He later steals Sheriff Keller's files on the murder as a way to clear him from suspicion. In the penultimate Season 1 episode, Hal reveals to a shocked Alice and Betty that his grandfather and the Blossom's grandfather were brothers and that he tried to keep Polly and Jason apart because they are third cousins. Although Alice initially kicks Hal out of the house in the middle of Season 1 after finding out he tried to get Polly to get an abortion, he moves back in with the family in the season finale.

It is later revealed in the Season 2 penultimate episode that Hal is the Black Hood, a serial killer who has targeted "sinners" in Riverdale since the end of Season 1. He ended up killing 4 people including Midge Klump, Ms. Grundy, Robert Phillips (the Sugarman), and Dr. Masters. Hal claimed he wanted to "cleanse the town" after being brainwashed as a child by his parents, who made him think such thoughts after his father massacred a family of four. After failing to kill Alice, he was arrested and sent to jail.

=== Alice Cooper ===
Betty's mother Alice Cooper appears at first glance to be identical to Archie's mother Mary, except that her hair is light blonde. Betty claims to be a natural blonde, which Veronica disbelieves, but blonde hair appears to be a family trait. Alice Cooper's maiden name was Smith (in one story, her first name is given as Helen and in another, her first name was given as Millie). She and Betty appear to have the closest mother-child relationship in Archie Comics. She is also a friend of Mary Andrews and Hermione Lodge.

A very warm-hearted woman, she is always there for Betty, very proud of her, and is always willing to help with her problems. Still, she hopes that Betty will eventually outgrow her tomboy phase and embrace some of Veronica's more desirable traits (though Betty does have several traditionally feminine interests). In later years, it is implied that Alice works, but this has not been explored. Even though the Coopers seem to be comfortably Middle Class, she secretly envies the Lodge wealth a little, mainly because she wishes she could afford to buy Betty the nice things the Lodge's buy for Veronica.

Mädchen Amick portrays Alice in the CW series Riverdale. In this version Alice is very strict and controlling with Betty, demanding only perfection from her. It is implied that this behavior started after Betty's older sister, Polly, had a mental breakdown after a bad relationship with Jason Blossom (although Betty says that Alice was the one who broke Polly; Jason only helped.) Her controlling behavior goes to extremes when Alice forbids Betty to be friends with Veronica and Archie because they are "rotten." She spies on Archie's family and reads her daughter's diary. Betty eventually told Alice not to use Polly and Jason as an excuse to not let her and Archie be together. She works as a reporter in the local newspaper (which the Cooper family owns), but she often publishes yellow journalism, and even publishes Jason Blossom's autopsy, which infuriates Cheryl's mom, Penelope. Alice openly dislikes the Lodge family and tries to shame Hermione in public. Alice's controlling nature is later attributed to her difficult life, with the startling revelation that she grew up on the Southside of Riverdale and was forced to give up her infant son for adoption when she was a teenager by her then-boyfriend Hal, making room for some sympathetic qualities. In Season 2, it was revealed that F.P. Jones was the father of her son, after a brief relationship in high school.

=== Polly and Chic Cooper ===
Betty's older sister Polly and brother Chic were introduced in Little Archie in the 1960s as teenagers. Polly mainly appeared in stories about her "older sister" relationship with Little Betty, while Chic mostly appeared in the adventure-based stories as Little Archie's teenage friend who could fill the role of "adult" when the plot needed a character who could drive a car, fight with the villains, etc. For years, they were not canonical characters in the mainstream Archie comics. However, by the 1990s, they had been integrated into the main continuity. Both have strawberry-blonde hair, are currently in their twenties, and are close to each other in age, but are significantly older than Betty (Polly still affectionately calls her "baby sister" on occasion). To explain why they rarely appear in the comics, it was established that Polly works as a television news reporter in San Francisco, and Chic works as a secret agent for the United States government. Both occasionally visited their family, though Polly made more appearances. Around 2005, it was revealed that Polly had accepted a job in Riverdale, and she now appears often, mainly in the Betty comic book.

Polly and Chic are portrayed by Tiera Skovbye and Hart Denton, respectively, in the TV series Riverdale. In the show, it is stated that Betty and Polly are the only children of Alice and Hal. The season 1 finale reveals that Alice was pregnant in high school and that she gave a son up for adoption that should now be in his mid-20s. In the show, Polly dates Jason Blossom, whose murder is what the main storyline revolves around through the first season. During the first few episodes, Betty is not allowed to see Polly and is told that Polly is getting help after having a mental breakdown that their parents blame on Jason. It is later revealed that Polly is pregnant with twins and was sent to the Sisters of Quiet Mercy, where she eventually breaks out of and is reunited with her family. In the penultimate episode of season 1, it is discovered that Polly and Jason are third cousins. Chic makes his first appearance in the season 2 mid-season premiere. However, it was revealed that Chic was an impostor and not Betty's real brother. It was also revealed that Chic had allegedly murdered Betty's real brother, Charles Smith and that F.P. Jones was the father of Alice's son. In the Season 3 finale episode, Chic, who's now the new Gargoyle King, teams with Hal and Penelope to kill Archie, Betty, Veronica, and Jughead but was defeated by Jughead. In the same episode, Betty and Jughead meet an FBI agent (portrayed by Wyatt Nash) who turns out to be the real Charles Smith and is also both Betty and Jughead's half-brother.

=== Caramel ===
Caramel is Betty's golden-haired cat. She originally appeared in Little Archie, but would later become a frequent character in the main continuity. She continues to make occasional appearances. Betty has owned many cats (Max, Susie, Buddy, Samantha, etc.), but Caramel is the best known and the most frequently appearing.

In the Riverdale TV Series, Caramel is euthanized by young Betty with a rock, after the cat had been fatally injured by an automobile.

=== Juniper and Dagwood ===
Juniper and Dagwood are Betty's niece and nephew, but they live with Cheryl Blossom, Betty's 3rd cousin.

== The Jones family ==
=== Forsythe Pendleton Jones II ===
Jughead's dad Forsythe Pendleton Jones II is very thin, unlike Fred Andrews or Hal Cooper. He looks exactly like Jughead, except for being older and balding. One story gives his name as Victor Jones, and another as Timothy Jones. He sometimes wishes his son could be more athletic like he was as a teenager. He makes enough to provide for his family, even after the birth of his daughter. A few stories have revolved around him having trouble with his job. One story has Jughead going on an investigation due to his father snapping at him because he was doing a demeaning job due to his union being out on strike. That job turned out to be that of city park maintenance which meant cleaning up after different people. The story ends with Jughead joining him at work. However, Mr. Jones usually provides his family with a comfortable middle-class lifestyle.

Skeet Ulrich portrays Forsythe in the TV series Riverdale. In this version he's the leader of the Southside Serpents, a well-known criminal bike gang; before that he used to work in Fred Andrew's construction company, but Fred fired him after he caught him stealing building material. His nickname in the show is 'FP'. Like Jughead and Archie, he was also a best friend of Fred in childhood and they both were in a musical band together in high school. In Season 2, it was revealed that he was the father of Alice Cooper's infant son, who she was made to give up for adoption.

=== Gladys Jones ===
Jughead's mom Gladys Jones is constantly trying to cure her son of his laziness and get him to do his chores. While Archie and Betty's mothers apparently began working following the feminist movement, Jughead's mother appears to be a stay-at-home mom. This is understandable, due to the birth of Jellybean. She was originally portrayed as very slim and had a nose just like her son's. In the 1990s, she was made more attractive with a nose normal in appearance, but still makes appearances with her old nose. Both parents having the same nose as Jughead causes contradiction, as Jellybean has a normal nose.

She is also the sister of Wilma Wilkin (of That Wilkin Boy), as they share a brother, Uncle Herman. Jughead has visited his cousin Bingo, who in turn visited Riverdale and his Aunt Gladys.

Gina Gershon played the character on Riverdale, where she is depicted as a "biker mama".

=== Hot Dog ===
Hot Dog is Jughead's dog, though when he first appeared, he belonged to Archie. Because of some confusion between the Archie Comics artists and the Filmation animation studio, Hot Dog switched owners frequently when he started appearing more. Hot Dog was eventually given a permanent home at Jugheads.

Hot Dog is a long-haired mutt who resembles a sheepdog. He usually thinks like a human in that his thoughts are presented in voice-over (or thought bubble in the comics) to the audience as asides where the dog's mouth does not move. Hot Dog is lazy, constantly hungry, and has a dislike for Reggie Mantle, much like Jughead. When Jughead's family objected to Hot Dog living indoors because he was covered in dirt, Dilton Doiley built Hot Dog a doghouse full of whimsical inventions, which was the kickoff plot for the miniseries Hot Dog.

=== Jellybean Jones ===
Forsythia "Jellybean" (or "JB") Jones is a recent addition to the Archie Comics continuity. During the 1990s an attempt to reinvent Jughead Jones's character was started through a story in which Jughead's mother unexpectedly becomes pregnant. This was published in a special storyline called "Jughead's Baby Tales". The story climaxed with Jellybean's birth in Jughead #50.

Jellybean was officially named Forsythia after her older brother, whose real name is Forsythe. Jughead dislikes the name in any form, and continues the family tradition of referring to the person only by his/her nickname by calling the baby "Jellybean". This name came from the type of truck that crashed and caused the traffic jam in which she was born. The name also probably stems from Jughead's fabled love of food. To Reggie Mantle, whenever he mentions Jellybean's real name, "Forsythia", some kind of disaster happened to him, like his car being towed, or him slipping on a can, injuring himself, or most notably, being carried away by an elephant from the circus. Despite this, Reggie did receive a short ego boost when Jellybean said her first word, which was veggie, and Jughead and his friends thought it was Reggie leaving Jughead to think that Jellybean would become a carbon copy of Reggie.

Jellybean is friends with Veronica Lodge, whom she initially disliked because Jughead encouraged Jellybean to antagonize Veronica. In one story, Jellybean and Veronica spend too much time together, leading the Joneses to try to separate them.

In a story called "Picture This", during a trip to the mall with Betty, Veronica wanted to have Jellybean taken to a photo studio (similar to Glamour Shots). Betty wasn't sure that Jellybean's parents would approve of it, but Veronica thought no harm would be done (but she sent Betty to the other side of the mall, while she put her scheme into action) and Betty finally relented after seeing the pics, which were adorable. However, this was revealed to be yet another ego-stroking plot to build Veronica up. Her scheme backfired when Jellybean was featured in the sign's picture, but not Veronica, which sent her, not surprisingly, into a temper tantrum. She demanded to be on the display, punctuating her demand by screaming that "A Lodge is NEVER cropped from a photo!" Her picture was put up, but it was a picture taken while she was throwing her tantrum, next to a sign that said "Satisfaction guaranteed or your money back"!

Jughead adores his sister, one of the few females, aside from his mother, his grandmother, and aunts, Betty, Miss Grundy, or Miss Beazly, that he can live with. Jellybean also loves Jughead very much. Her favorite thing is one of Jughead's old beanies, that she can't go anywhere without. Another one of her favorite things is a recalled toy, although unseen, called Trevor the Too-Too Train, an obvious parody of Thomas the Tank Engine, recalled due to having too many small parts.

She only occasionally appears in the stories and obviously conflicts with reprints of earlier stories stating or implying that Jughead is an only child. Her communication is expressed to the reader through thought balloons, though no one can understand her. Some later stories have Jellybean speaking short sentences. In one story that focuses on their parents' date from hell, Jellybean exclaims that her parents are "kissing," and later, "not kissing." Jughead is the babysitter in the story.

Jughead and Jellybean are unusual in the Archie world in that they are two of the few characters who are not "only children". Besides the Jones, the Blossoms, Coopers, and Mantles also have more than one child. Betty often babysits her with Jughead.

=== Paul "Souphead" Jones ===
Souphead Jones is Jughead's young cousin who, except for being much shorter, looks (and often dresses) exactly like him. He is apparently the same age as Leroy and has been around as long, but doesn't appear as often. Both still appear in the occasional new story to this day. He is constantly making Jughead mad but as the years went on in the Archie comics he started to become friends with Jughead.

=== Extended family ===
Grandma and Grandpa Jones are the parents of Jughead's father, Forsythe Pendleton Jones II. They appeared in the episode The Jones Farm on The Archie Show in 1968. They were depicted as an older couple that both physically resemble Jughead (including having long noses) and live in the country. In the early 1990s, Grandma Jones is reintroduced into the Jughead comic book series during Jughead's "new look" period where Jughead became a skateboarder (Jughead Vol. 2 #27-38). This version of Grandma Jones (who still bears a strong resemblance to Jughead) is a hip single woman that drives a convertible and lives in the Riverdale suburbs. She also takes guitar lessons from The Potholes (a local band that practices in her garage). She disappears once the "new look" period ends. A more traditional version of Grandma Jones appears in Jughead Vol. 2 #55, where Jughead's parents take him and Jellybean to the Jones farm to visit their grandparents. However, this version of Grandma Jones doesn't physically resemble Jughead. She has a normal nose, short gray hair, and a heavier body build than the prior version of Grandma Jones that appeared during the "new look" period. It is also revealed in this story that Jughead's spinster aunt Iris lives with Grandma and Grandpa Jones on the farm. Other relatives live nearby and visit the farm, including Jughead's aunt Jenny and her son Frederick, and aunt Elsie and uncle Ted with their daughter Estelle and twin sons Bobby and Billy. Jughead's aunt Sophie and her daughter Liz are later introduced in Jughead's Double Digest #165.

Timothy Webber played Forsythe Pendleton Jones I, Jughead's grandfather in Riverdale.

== The Lodge family ==
=== Hiram Lodge ===
The billionaire business tycoon Hiram Lodge is Hermione Lodge's husband and Veronica's father. He doesn't like Archie due to his clumsiness but tolerates him because he makes Veronica happy and treats her well. Mr. Lodge is also the richest and most powerful man in the small town of Riverdale.

=== Hermione Lodge ===
Hermione Lodge is the wife of Hiram Lodge and mother of Veronica Lodge. Her maiden name has not been revealed. In the Riverdale Universe, it is known to be Gomez.

According to some stories, Hermione's parents' fortune is what Mr. Lodge built on to make his fortune and business empire, being himself quite destitute (but very ambitious) before he married her. Many other stories, however, run on the assumption that both Hermione and Hiram come from money (he is actually named after the real-life old money Lodge family). The Lodges moved their family to the fictional small town of Riverdale to raise their daughter in a "normal" community. Mrs. Lodge is usually seen doing charity work and her gardening or women's club.

Often a minor character in many stories featured in Archie Comics, Hermione Lodge is a patrician but loving woman who is loyal to her family and often at a loss in dealing with the angst and attitudes of modern teenagers. She is generally portrayed as a slender, white-haired woman, but, like many of the parents of the Archie teenagers, she has been made more youthful in recent years by the writers and editors of the comic book series.

Marisol Nichols portrays Hermione in the CW series Riverdale. Hermione grew up in Riverdale and dated Archie's father Fred. She left him to marry the wealthy Hiram Lodge and move to New York City. After her husband was arrested for fraud and embezzlement, she and Veronica moved back to Riverdale. She still has a small fortune that her husband stashed before he was arrested. She and Veronica are living in a luxury apartment building in Riverdale that Hermione owns and has a butler and doorman Smithers, still loyal to the Lodge family. She even tried to find work, by trying to get a job as a bookkeeper in her ex-boyfriend Fred Andrew's construction site, however, Fred told her he cannot hire her because of the Lodge's new reputation as money launderers. She finally gets a job as a waitress at Pop's. After Jason's memorial, Hermione ran into Fred, who tells her that the bookkeeper position in his business is still vacant so she can have the job if she wants, which she accepts in excitement.

=== Leroy Lodge ===
Leroy Lodge is Veronica's young cousin who is apparently in elementary school. He is something of a troublemaker and prankster, making him resemble a younger version of Reggie. He has been a minor but consistently recurring character since the 1940s. One significant role was in Archie's R/C Racers, where he was mainly added to give Reggie's team a sixth member and even up the teams. In that series, he often gave the reader tips on how to operate and maintain a remote-controlled vehicle.

=== Marcy McDermott ===
Marcy McDermott is Veronica's nerdy cousin who comes to visit her now and then. Debuting in the early 2000s, she is a devoted fan of science fiction who enjoys comic book conventions and Space Trek (a parody of Star Trek). Veronica is a bit indifferent towards her lifestyle, but Marcy still hangs around and sometimes works as Veronica's assistant whenever needed. She has auburn hair and is a freshman at Riverdale High. Her glasses’ oddly-shaped frames reflect her fondness for science fiction.

Her mother is Veronica's single Aunt Elsie. In one story, Marcy eventually got a stepfamily when Elsie married widower Max Wells (who, unfortunately for Veronica, was the father of her new boyfriend Bryan, making them now cousins).

=== Alice Lodge ===
Alice is Veronica's cousin who visits her from the "West Coast". Alice and Veronica get along well and talk about boys together. They are both very attractive: so much so that, at first, Veronica refuses to introduce Alice to Archie. However, she then changes her mind and decides to let Alice meet Archie to test him.

Veronica's schemes to send Alice to Archie's house all by herself, so she can find out whether or not Archie will respond to Alice's flirting when Veronica is not around. However, owing to an unexpected concatenation of events, when Alice knocks on the door, Jughead answers, and she assumes he is Archie. Because Jughead dislikes girls, he ignores Alice (a beautiful girl) completely, even when she flirts shamelessly and even tries to kiss him.

As a result, Alice, who is disgruntled because "Archie" ignores her, reports back to Veronica that her boyfriend Archie "would be safe in a harem".

=== Aunt Zoey ===
First appearance: Veronica #110

Aunt Zoey is Veronica's truck driving aunt. She is a stocky woman with short black hair (with streaks of white and gray), and she is partial to plaid flannel shirts. She does not live in Riverdale, but she visits Veronica whenever her route may bring her into town.

=== Harper Lodge ===
First appearance: Archie #656 (August 2014)

Harper Lodge is Veronica's cousin. She is a teenage girl with long black hair with pink highlights. She visits Riverdale where she's considering attending Riverdale High. She is physically disabled and requires the use of a wheelchair to get around it. She was revealed to be bisexual.

=== Veronica's pets ===
Veronica has had a number of purebred dogs and cats over the years. When she has a dog, it is usually a poodle. Some of these include Fifi and Lucretia, the latter having ended up in a romantic relationship with Hot Dog, much to her chagrin. At the end of one story, they had a litter of puppies. Jughead and Veronica were not pleased at this, because it effectively made them "in-laws". She also briefly had a puppy named Pinky in a Jughead comic.

Minari, Beatrice and Smedley are some of Veronica Lodge's purebred cats. Minari has made many appearances in recent stories. Veronica is often portrayed talking to Minari when she is feeling "blue". Beatrice is Veronica's Angora and she often takes her to cat shows, in which she wins many awards. Smedley is often portrayed in the Little Archie comics. She was once left in the care of Little Jughead when Veronica, Betty, Reggie, and Archie try to get their families to vacation together, ending in Betty and Veronica getting stuck at a cowboy ranch while Reggie and Archie go deep-water fishing.

=== Servants ===
- Gaston is the Lodge Mansion's French chef. He speaks with a bad French accent, and is very temperamental, especially when the subject is his cooking. Gaston hates it when Veronica caters a party using outside cooks, or she cooks for Archie, often with horrible results. Along with Ms. Beazley and Pop Tate, he is one of Jughead's favorite cooks. Occasionally, a chef named Pierre comes when Gaston is on vacation in France.
- The maids at the Lodge Mansion have been referred to by many names, and it may be that the Lodges have been through many maids. However, they never had any character development, so all maids are treated as if the same character with no consistent names. Several stories give their names as Sandra, Fifi, Marie, Celeste, Olga, or Robin.
- Hubert H. Smithers, usually just called Smithers, is the portly and balding butler to the Lodge Mansion and the servant who appears most often. A running gag is how Archie annoys Smithers as much as he annoys Mr. Lodge, and Smithers takes great pleasure in throwing Archie out of the house. Despite his frustration with Archie's clumsiness, he remains faithful to the Lodges. Sometimes he calls Veronica's friends "Master Archie", "Miss Betty", etc., while other times he calls them simply by their first names and applies the formality only to the Lodges. Once, when his nephew visited him, his first name was revealed to be Hubert. In older comics, he was referred to as Jeeves or Jenkins.

In one Little Archie story, Mr. Lodge told how he and Smithers were childhood friends, and Smithers Sr. was the family butler. Back then, Mr. Lodge called him by the nickname Smitty.

Smithers appears in the TV series Riverdale portrayed by Tom McBeath. He works as a doorman in a luxury apartment building that is owned by Hermione Lodge and still loyal to Hermione and Veronica Lodge.

== The Mantle family ==
=== Richard "Ricky" Mantle ===
Reggie's father Ricky Mantle is the owner (sometimes publisher or editor-in-chief depending on the story) of the local newspaper. In the Riverdale TV series, Reggie's father's name has been changed to "Marty".

=== Vicky Mantle ===
Very little is known of Reggie's mother Vicky Mantle—she has appeared only a few times, such as in Archie's Pals and Gals #108, and when she does, she is usually only a background character. In the Riverdale TV series, Reggie's mother's name has been changed to "Melinda". In the 2016 "Reggie And Me" series it's revealed Reggier's mom is active in worthwhile charities but neglects her own son.

== The Clayton family ==
=== Coach Clayton ===
Mr. Clayton is the coach at Riverdale High. He is fair to all his students including his own son Chuck.

=== Ms. Clayton ===
Ms. Clayton appears in some issues of Archie Comics. Such as posing as the Riverdale High Girls Basketball Coach and she leads them to the division championship. She is also a loving mother to her son, Chuck Clayton. She is also one of the few female African-American characters.

=== Chuck Clayton ===
Chuck is the lead sports person for the football team and his dad is the coach. He is pushed very hard and in Riverdale is a character who gets on Betty and Veronica's bad side and spends a lot of time trying to make a new image.

=== Monica ===
Monica is Chuck Clayton's younger cousin. She is around 11 years old. Chuck used her as the model for his comic book character PowerTween (a sidekick to PowerTeen, which Chuck based on Veronica), and most of her appearances have been in stories where she is dressed as PowerTween, helping to promote Chuck's comics.

== The Blossom family ==
=== Jason Blossom ===
Jason Blossom is the twin brother of Cheryl Blossom. His first appearance is Jughead #325. He was prominently featured in the Love Showdown series. He is very arrogant due to his wealth and attractiveness. His hair is a somewhat darker shade of red than Cheryl's. He wears contact lenses, a fact that is revealed when he loses them due to squirts of water from a water-gun-carrying Veronica Lodge. Jason lives with his family in Pembrooke, the "rich" side of Riverdale, and refers to those who live on the other side as "Townies". He is two minutes older than his sister, a fact of which he is very proud.

One of Jason's classmates from Pembrooke was his best friend and sidekick, Cedric. At a televised quiz program, similar to Jeopardy!, Cedric sabotages Dilton to guarantee that Pembrooke will win the event. However, Moose manages to win for Riverdale on a sports question and then clobbers Cedric. On his way to congratulate the winners, Jason refuses to help Cedric up, showing that he, like Cheryl, has limits.

Unlike most characters introduced in the 1980s, he still makes occasional appearances. He most often appeared during the 1990s, when the Cheryl Blossom series was published. During that time, the Blossom twins attended Pembrooke High, a private school for rich students. He rarely appears in stories that do not feature his sister, which is why he was used less when Cheryl Blossom ended as a series.

Despite Jason's views, he is mainly attracted to Betty Cooper rather than Veronica Lodge, who is much closer to his social status. The two occasionally date, which sometimes makes Archie jealous. He was once seen "practicing" asking Betty out in front of a mirror. In very rare instances, he professes an interest for Veronica, Cheryl's rival. However, a possible relationship with either of them is hindered by his clique's disdain for "townies".

In Archie & Friends #145, Jason and Cheryl tell the Archie Gang that they are officially at the age of 18. Although the two are rivals, Jason does seem to have a lot of respect for Archie and vice versa.

In Riverdale, based on the comics, Jason is portrayed by Trevor Stines. He is murdered prior to the beginning of the series and the storyline of Season 1 revolves around his murder. He dated Betty's sister Polly prior to his death and she is initially pregnant with and later gives birth to and raises their children who are twins.

=== Clifford and Penelope Blossom ===
Clifford and Penelope Blossom are Jason and Cheryl's parents. They were originally named Frank and Rose Blossom. Penelope is an attractive woman with the same bright red hair as Cheryl, while Clifford's hair is somewhat darker like Jason's and he has a goatee. Yet in some comics Clifford's hair is grey and balding, also Penelope's hair is shorter, darker, and curly. Created in the age of yuppies, the Blossoms were a much wealthier family than the Lodges, due to the fortune Clifford Blossom made as a software designer. In one story, Clifford's corporation went bankrupt and they were about to lose all their wealth when Mr. Lodge bought out their company to save them from poverty. However, despite their wealth, and much like the Lodges, they're down-to-earth, and not as snobby as their offspring could be.

Clifford and Penelope were instrumental in thwarting Cheryl's scheme to break up the Riverdale gang's friendships for good when they were informed of their daughter's deceit by a concerned Mr. Weatherbee. They forced her to shed her assumed identity of Shirley Merryweather and punished her by making her attend Riverdale High for the remainder of the school year.

In Riverdale, Clifford and Penelope are portrayed by Barclay Hope and Nathalie Boltt, respectively.

=== Sugar ===
Sugar is Cheryl Blossom’s purebred Pomeranian dog. Although Cheryl may seem snobby and antagonistic at times, Sugar proves that she has a soft sentimental side. She also proves that Cheryl prefers top-breed dogs to mixed breeds like Hot Dog.

== The Doiley family ==
=== Mrs. Tanya Doiley ===
Mrs. Doiley, Dilton's mother, has made a few appearances. She appears similar to Mrs. Andrews or Mrs. Cooper, except for being a bespectacled brunette woman. This appears to be the only case where an Archie character's mother appears significantly more than his or her father. Though her son's inventiveness and IQ often confuses her, she is very proud of and supportive of Dilton.

=== Mr. Kenny Doiley ===
Mr. Doiley hardly ever appears even in the background. He has black hair and spectacles similar to his son Dilton. One of his appearances was made when Dilton, wanting to be like Moose Mason, tries to convince his father to buy him dumbbells. In one story, Dilton found out that Mr. Doiley is actually his stepfather. None of Dilton's friends know this except for Chuck Clayton. Dilton almost ran away from home after the shock of learning it. However, Chuck made Dilton realize that Mr. Doiley loves him like a real father and that he would be heartbroken if Dilton ran away.

In Riverdale, his first name was given as Daryl.

== The Weatherbee family ==
=== Tony Weatherbee ===
Tony Weatherbee is the twin brother of Riverdale Highschool's principle Waldo Weatherbee and the father of Wendy Weatherbee. Unlike his brother Waldo, Tony didn't focus on his studies. He was more interested in socializing. He did eventually go on to become a successful motorcycle customizer. Although Tony and Waldo's relationship had been strained for many years they are now getting back to being as close as they were as children. Unlike the Bee, Tony has a full head of hair (which he wears quite long) and sports a horseshoe mustache.

=== Wendy Weatherbee ===
Wendy "WW (or Double W)" Weatherbee, created by artist Fernando Ruiz and editor Nelson Ribeiro, is the creative and eccentric niece of the principal of Riverdale High School, Waldo Weatherbee. She first appeared in Tales From Riverdale Digest #10. At first, Veronica thought she was too quirky, but Betty liked her. She likes to call herself WW. She likes being an individualist. She belongs to an entomology club, has an odd sense of fashion, and keeps all sorts of pets, including a tarantula named Tara and an iguana named Ike. She also has her own website of her likes and dislikes.

Once the boys found out that she was Mr. Weatherbee's niece, they avoided her. The key factor to Wendy's character is that despite her attractiveness, she has a hard time finding a date due to her relationship with the principal. Wendy once tried to get Jughead to like her in Jughead and Friends #12 (his individualism was just the sort of thing that interested her). Other potential love interests have included Dilton Doiley, and Bingo Wilkin; however, the stories involving these were one-off plots, no one has become her official boyfriend. Nevertheless, she and Jughead have become friends.

Her father, Tony, who is Mr. Weatherbee's twin brother, appears in Tales From Riverdale #28. The Weatherbee twins grew up very different. While Waldo was studious and serious, Tony was more interested in socializing and motorcycle riding. In the end, he started a family and a successful motorcycle business, but he and his brother fell out of touch due to their strained relationship. However, after Wendy was introduced, they put aside their differences and are growing close again.

== Other families ==
=== The Lopez Family ===
Ginger Lopez's parents are Eduardo and Gloria Lopez. She also has younger twin sisters named Teresa and Eliza. Little is known about Ginger's family, although both her parents have considerable fame, Eduardo as a chef and Gloria as an animal trainer.

=== Ramon Rodriguez ===
Ramon Rodriguez is Maria's father and for a time the vice-principal of Riverdale High. His initials earned him the affectionate nickname of "Choo-Choo". He is apparently a famous artist, as dictated in one Archie story that he is "the" Ramon Rodriguez.

=== Chili Dog ===
Chili Dog appeared in the animated Sabrina the Teenage Witch. When "Hot Dog" was colored white, Chili Dog was colored orange. A running gag on the series is that Hot Dog and Chili Dog are in a state of war with Sabrina's cat Salem.

== See also ==
- List of Archie Comics characters
- Riverdale High School (Archie Comics)
