= Trevor Stines =

American actor

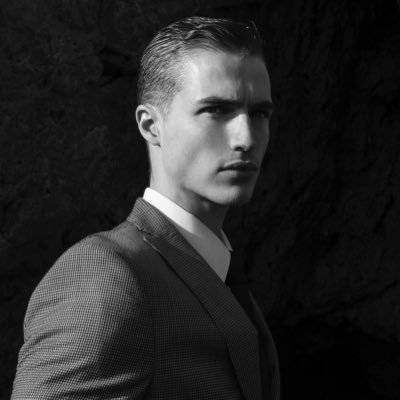
- Born: July 15, 1996 (age 30); Olympia, Washington, U.S.
- Occupations: Actor; model
- Years active: 2015–present
- Height: 1.85 m (6 ft 1 in)

Trevor Stines (born July 15, 1996) is an American actor, best known for his role as Jason Blossom in Riverdale (2017–2023).

== Career ==
Stines began his professional acting career at the age of 19, when he has appeared in the TV Show Blue Match Comedy, The Fosters, Wrong Hole and The Rookie: Feds.

Stines made his feature film debut in 2016, when he played the role of Brett in the horror film The Amityville Terror, directed by Michael Angelo and written by Amanda Barton, based on Jay Anson's 1977 novel of the same name, which was released on August 2, 2016.

Stines appeared in the first season of Riverdale, which he played the recurring role of Jason Blossom and also guest role as Teen Clifford Blossom.

In 2019, Stines starred opposite Sloane Avery in the thriller drama film Purity Falls, directed by Sam Irvin, which was released on May 31, 2019. On the same year, Stines also played the role of Rick Rhodes in the mystery thriller film Secrets at the Lake starring Anna Hutchison and Nicky Whelan, directed by Tim Cruz, which released on August 27, 2019. He played the role of Sean in the television film Most Likely to Murder.

Stines plays Josh Richards in the drama film Evan Wood, directed by Niki Byrne, which was released on May 10, 2022.

== Filmography ==
=== Film ===
Year	Title	Role	Notes
2015	A Tragic Love Story	Chester	Short
2016	The Amityville Terror	Brett	
2016	The Impasse of Light	Gans	Short film
2017	Spen/cer	Paul Watson	Short film
2018	Watchdog	Errol Moran	Short film
2019	Purity Falls	Jason	
2019	Secrets at the Lake	Rick Rhodes	
2021	Evan Wood	Josh Richards	

=== Television ===
Year	Title	Role	Notes
2015	Blue Match Comedy	Backpacker #2	Episode: "Really? - Welcome to Sweden"
2016	The Fosters	Tristan Chacones	Episodes: "Forty" and "Justify"
2016	Wrong Hole	K's Hot Date	Episode: "Dating is Hard"
2017–2023	Riverdale	Jason Blossom	Recurring role (season 1), guest (season 2, 4, 5, 6); cameo (season 7) 19 episodes
2018	Riverdale	Teen Clifford Blossom	Episode: "Chapter Thirty-Nine: The Midnight Club" (season 3)
2019	Most Likely to Murder	Sean	Television film
2022	The Rookie: Feds	Kellen Filmore	Episode: "Star Crossed"
