= Nathalie Boltt =

South African actress (b. 1973)

- Born: 19 July 1973 (age 53); South Africa
- Education: Rhodes University
- Occupation: Actress
- Years active: 1998–present
- Children: 1

Nat Boltt (born 19 July 1973) is a South African actress, director and writer, whose debut feature film, Holy Days, which she wrote and directed, was released in 2026. She started out as a writer and actor. She is known for her role in District 9 and as Penelope Blossom for seven seasons on The CW’s teen drama series Riverdale from 2017 to 2023. In 2026, her directorial debut, Holy Days, was released.

== Early life and education ==
Boltt grew up in Johannesburg in South Africa during apartheid and graduated with a BA in Acting and Dance from Rhodes University in Grahamstown in 1995.

== Career ==
Her initial break into acting was in her birth country, South Africa, as Joey Ortlepp on the SABC 3 drama Isidingo from 2001 to 2004. In 2005, she appeared in The Poseidon Adventure, the NBC remake of the film of the same name.

In 2009, she had a supporting role in Neill Blomkamp's South Africa-set science fiction action film, District 9. She then had a support role in the New Zealand television film, Bloodlines, based on the true story of Colin Bouwer, a South African doctor in New Zealand who killed his wife. She received a nomination for Best Supporting Actress at the 2011 Aotearoa Film & Television Awards.

In 2017, she had a role in 24 Hours to Live alongside Ethan Hawke.

She also voices many characters, including of DottyWot in the New Zealand children's series The WotWots.

In 2026, her directorial debut, Holy Days, was released. Filmed in New Zealand, the movie features Jackie Weaver, Judy Davis and Miriam Margolyes as elderly nuns who take a road trip to try and save their convent. The film was screened for distributors at the 2025 Toronto International Film Festival, and premiered to at the Santa Barbara International Film Festival. It was theatrically released in New Zealand on 26 February, and will be released in North America on 27 March.

== Personal life ==
She emigrated from South Africa to New Zealand in 2006 and raised her son in Wellington with her husband, Phil. She has since emigrated to Canada and now lives in Vancouver.

== Filmography ==
=== Film ===
Year	Title	Role	Notes
2007	Flood	Kate Morrison	
2007	Route 30	Mandy	
2008	Doomsday	Jane Harris	
2009	District 9	Sarah Livingstone	
2010	Kawa	Annabelle	
2013	The Silk	Nurse	
2014	The Cure	Ruby Wakefield	
2014	Route 30 Three!	Agent Nat	
2015	Food for Thought	Merran	Short film
2017	24 Hours to Live	Dr Helen	
2020	Watershed	Sam	Short film
2021	Demonic	Angela	
2024	The Ornament	Luna	Short film
2026	Holy Days	Liz	Directorial debut
2026	Remnant	Vivian	

=== Television ===
Year	Title	Role	Notes
1998	Isidingo	Joey Ortlepp	Series regular; soap opera
2003	Red Water	Marie Savoy	TV movie
2004	Platinum	Rosa von Zülow	TV movie
2005	The Poseidon Adventure	Shoshanna	TV movie
2005	The Triangle	News Reporter	Miniseries; uncredited
2007	Power Rangers Operation Overdrive	Jessica Jefferies	Episode: "Behind the Scenes"
2008	Inspector George Gently	Trudi Schmeikel	Episode: "Bomber's Moon"
2009	The Cult	European Woman	3 episodes
2010	The WotWots	DottyWot	Main cast (series 1); voice role
2012	True Crime: Siege	Vicki Snee	TV movie
2014–2015	Step Dave	Natalie Robinson	4 episodes
2015	When We Go to War	Ida Mueller	Miniseries
2016	Bombshell	Dominique Prieur	TV movie
2016–2017	800 Words	Rae	5 episodes
2017–2023	Riverdale	Penelope Blossom	Recurring role; also director of episode: "Chapter Ninety-Three: Dance of Death"
2018	Origin	Laura Kassman	Episode: "God's Grandeur"
2018	Happy Together	Amelia	Episode: "The Power of Yes... Men"
2019	Mystery 101: Words Can Kill	Celia Bunton	TV movie
2020	Chilling Adventures of Sabrina	Miss DuBois	Episode: "Chapter Twenty-One: The Hellbound Heart"
2022	The Secrets of Bella Vista	Shannon	TV movie
2024	A Remarkable Place to Die	Marijke Van Heusen	1 episode

=== Web ===
Year	Title	Role	Notes
2015	Dropped Pie	Charrlotte Houghton-Bradley	3 episodes
