= List of Archie Comics publications =

This is a list of Archie Comics publications.

== A ==
| Title | Vol. | Issues | Dates | Notes |
|---|---|---|---|---|
| Adventures of the Jaguar | | #1-15 | September 1961 – November 1963 | Archie Adventure Series imprint |
| Adventures of the Fly | 1 | #1-31 | August 1959 – October 1964; May 1965 | Archie Adventure Series imprint; #31 cover titled Fly Man |
| Adventures of the Fly | 2 | #32-39 | July 1965 – September 1966 | Re-titled Fly Man |
| Adventures of the Fly | 3 | #1-9 | May 1983 – October 1984 | Retitled The Fly |
| Adventures of Young Doctor Masters | | #1-2 | August 1964 – November 1964 | |
| Afterlife with Archie | | #1-10 | October 2013 - August 2016 | Archie Horror series |
| Archie | 1 (former) | #1–666 | Winter 1942 – June 2015 | #1–19 as MLJ Magazines |
| Archie | 2 | #1–32 | July 2015 – 2018 | Part of New Riverdale |
| Archie | 1 (continued) | #699–709 | October 2018 - December 2019 | Resumed original numbering while continuing the storyline from Vol. 2. Part of New Riverdale. |
| Archie | 3 | #1–present | September 2026 – | Part of Archie Comics' partnership with Oni Press. |
| Archie: 1941 | | #1–5 | October 2018 – February 2019 | Five issue miniseries. |
| Archie: 1955 | | #1-5 | September 2019 - February 2020 | Five issue miniseries. |
| Archie 3000! | | #1–16 | May 1989 – July 1991 | |
| Archie All Canadian Digest | | #1 | Aug. 1996 | One-shot comic only. This comic takes Archie and the gang across Canada to have fun. With stories like "The Viking Trail", "Canada Here We Come", "Operation Ottawa–Hull!", and last but not least "Canada Calling"; plus the Prologue and Epilogue as well. |
| Archie Americana Series | | | June 1995 – April 2011 | Series of trade paperbacks attempting to present a history of Archie Comics, with each book featuring significant stories from a specific decade, and featuring introductions by famous writers and celebrities. |
| Archie... Archie Andrews, Where Are You? | | #1–114 | Feb. 1977 – May 1998 | |
| Archie Annual | | #1–26 | 1950–1975 | Continues as Archie Annual Digest |
| Archie Annual Digest Magazine | | #27–69 | 1975–1998 | Continues from Archie Annual |
| Archie & Friends | 1 | #1–159 | Sept. 1992 – Feb. 2012 | |
| Archie & Friends | 2 | #1-present | 2019–present | |
| Archie & Friends Double Digest | | #1–33 | Feb. 2011 – Jan 2014 | Continues as Archie's Funhouse Digest |
| Archie and Katy Keene | | #1-4 | January 2020 - July 2020 | |
| Archie and Me | | #1–161 | Oct. 1964 – Feb. 1987 | |
| Archie and Me Jumbo Comics Digest | | #1–Present | Oct. 2017 – Present | Continues from Archie's Funhouse Comics Double Digest |
| Archie at Riverdale High | | #1–113 | Aug. 1972 – Feb. 1987 | |
| Archie's Christmas Stocking | | #1–7 | 1993–1999 | |
| Archie Comics: Judgement Day | | #1-3 | May 2024 - July 2024 | Archie Horror series |
| Archie Digest | | #1–267 | Aug. 1973 – Sept. 2010 | |
| Archie's Double Digest Quarterly Magazine | | #1–9 | Jan. 1982 – Jan. 1984 | Continues as Archie Jumbo Comics Digest Magazine |
| Archie's Explorers of the Unknown! | | #1–6 | June 1990 – April 1991 | |
| Archie's Funhouse Double Digest | | #1–28 | Mar 2014 – Sept 2017 | Continues as Archie and Me Jumbo Comics Digest |
| Archie Giant Series | | #1–35, 136–251, 452–632 (332 total issues) | Dec. 1954 – July 1992 | Revolving one–shot and recurring titles similar to Dell Comics' Four Color series. Early issues had longer page counts, but by the late 1970s it became a 32-page book while retaining "Giant" in the title. |
| Archie's Girls Betty and Veronica | | #1–347 | 1950 – April 1987 | Considered volume 1 of Betty and Veronica, with the 1987 series listing itself as volume 2 in the indicia. |
| Archie's Holiday Fun Digest | | #1–12 | February 1997 – December 2007 | |
| Archie's Jokebook Magazine | | #1–3 (no number–4 thru 14) 15–288 (277 total issues) | 1953 – Nov. 1982 | |
| Archie Jumbo Comics 75th Anniversary | | #1–12 | Sept. 2016 – July 2017 | Continues as Archie Milestones Digest |
| Archie Jumbo Comics Digest | | #10–current | May 1984 – present | Continues from Archie's Double Digest Quarterly Magazine |
| Archie's Madhouse | | #1–66 | September 1959 – February 1969 | Continued as Mad House Ma-ad |
| Archie Meets Batman of 1966 | | #1–6 | August 2018 – 2019 | Archie, Betty, Reggie, Jughead and Veronica Meet Batman and Robin. The Gang set out to stop The Joker and The Penguin. |
| Archie Meets Ramones | | #1 | October 2016 | One-shot only. Features the Archies meeting the Ramones. |
| Archie Meets Riverdale | | #1 | May 2022 | Archie Meets Riverdale is a 32-page, full color, one-shot comic crossover between the classic and modern versions of the iconic Archie Comics characters, from which the hit CW series Riverdale is based on. |
| Archie Meets The B-52s | | #1 | February 2020 | One-shot |
| Archie Meets the Punisher | | #1 | August 1994 | One-shot comic only. It was an intercompany crossover published by both Marvel Comics and Archie Comics. It features The Punisher meeting Archie Andrews when the former comes to Riverdale looking for a notorious drug dealer. |
| Archie Milestones Digest | | #1–3 | April–June 2019 | Continues from Archie Jumbo Comics 75th Anniversary |
| Archie's Pal Jughead | 1 | #1–126, Annual #1–8 | 1949 – Nov. 1965 | Continues as Jughead vol. 1 |
| Archie's Pal Jughead | 2 | #46–#214 | June 1993 – Sept. 2012 | Continues from Jughead vol. 2 |
| Archie's Pals 'n' Gals | | #1–224 | 1952 – September 1991 | |
| Archie's Super Hero Special | 1 | #1 | January 1979 | Red Circle Comics imprint |
| Archie's Super Hero Special | 2 | #1 | 1979 | Retitled Archie's Super Hero Comic Digest Magazine |
| Archie's Superteens Versus Crusaders | | #1-2 | June 2018 - July 2018 | |
| Archie's TV Laugh-Out | | #1–106 | Dec. 1969 – Feb. 1986 | |
| Archie vs. Predator | | #1–4 | April – July 2015 | Four and five issues of limited series comics. It was an intercompany crossover published by Dark Horse Comics and Archie Comics. It features the Predator meeting Archie Andrews when the former comes to Riverdale looking to kill Veronica Lodge. |
| Archie vs. Predator II | | #1–5 | July 2019 – January 2020 | Four and five issues of limited series comics. It was an intercompany crossover published by Dark Horse Comics and Archie Comics. It features the Predator meeting Archie Andrews when the former comes to Riverdale looking to kill Veronica Lodge. |
| Archie vs. Sharknado | | #1 | July 2015 | One-shot comic only. It was released as tie-in material for Sharknado 3: Oh Hell No!. It deals with Riverdale being hit by a Sharknado right at the end of the school year. |
| Archie Vs. the World | | #1 | March 2023 | One-shot comic only. |
| Archie's Mysteries | | #26–34 | Feb. 2003 – June 2004 | Continues from Archie's Weird Mysteries |
| Archie's Weird Mysteries | | #1–25 | Feb. 2000 – Dec. 2002 | Continues as Archie's Mysteries |

== B ==
| Title | Vol. | Issues | Dates | Notes |
|---|---|---|---|---|
| B & V Friends Jumbo Comics Digest | | #209–current | Jan. 2011 – present | Continues from Betty and Veronica Digest |
| Betty | | #1–195 | Sept. 1992 – Jan. 2012 | |
| Betty's Diary | | #1–40 | April 1986 – April 1990 | |
| Betty and Me | | #1–200 | Aug. 1965 – Aug. 1992 | |
| Betty & Veronica | 2 | #1–278 | June 1987 – October 2015 | The true Vol. 1 is what is listed as 'Archie's Girls Betty and Veronica' above; indicias of the 1987 series all say Vol. 2 |
| Betty & Veronica | 3 | #1–3 | July 2016 – September 2016 | Relaunch of the core Archie series featuring updated and realistic looks for the characters. Part of "New Riverdale"; Continues to Betty and Veronica Vixens |
| Betty & Veronica | 4 | #1–5 | January–May 2019 | Re-Relaunch of The Archie Forever Issue; Continues from Betty and Veronica Vixens |
| Betty and Veronica Digest Magazine | | #1–208 | Nov. 1980 – Oct. 2010 | Continues to B & V Friends Double Digest |
| Betty And Veronica: Friends Forever | | #1-current | May 2018– present | |
| Betty and Veronica Jumbo Comics Digest | | #1–current | June 1987 – present | |
| Betty and Veronica Spectacular | | #1–90 | Oct. 1992 – July 2009 | Started out as a quarterly title rotating with Archie & Friends and World of Archie, which all replaced the Archie Giant Series Magazine title. |
| Betty and Veronica Summer Fun | | #1–6 | 1994–1999 | Six annual issues |
| Betty & Veronica: Vixens | | #1–10 | November 2017 – December 2018 | |
| Big Ethel Energy | | #1-120 | September 2021 – April 2024 | A Webtoon original comic book series. |
| Black Hood Comics | | #9–19 | Winter 1943 – Summer 1946 | As MLJ Magazine for #9–17; continues from Hangman Comics, and continues as Laugh Comics |
| Blossoms 666 | | #1–5 | January – July 2019 | Archie Horror mini-series |
| Blue Ribbon Comics | 1 | #1–22 | November 1939 — March 1942 | As MLJ Magazines |
| Blue Ribbon Comics | 2 | #1-14 | November 1983 – December 1984 | Red Circle Comics imprint |

== C ==
| Title | Vol. | Issues | Dates | Notes |
|---|---|---|---|---|
| The Carneys | | #1 | Summer 1994 | One-shot |
| Cheryl Blossom | | #1–37 | April 1997 – Sept. 2001 | |
| Chilling Adventures in Sorcery as Told by Sabrina | | #1–2 | September 1972 – October 1972 | Continued as Chilling Adventures in Sorcery |
| Chilling Adventures in Sorcery | 1 | #3-5 | October 1973 – February 1974 | Continued from Chilling Adventures in Sorcery as Told by Sabrina; Continued as Red Circle Sorcery; Red Circle Comics imprint |
| Chilling Adventures in Sorcery | 2 | #1 | December 2021 | Archie Horror one-shot |
| Chilling Adventures of Sabrina | | #1–9 | October 2014 – present | Archie Horror series |
| Chilling Adventures of Sabrina Presents: Madam Satan | | #1 | October 2020 | Archie Horror one-shot |
| Chilling Adventures of Salem | | #1 | October 2022 | Archie Horror one-shot |
| Chilling Adventures Presents Betty: The Final Girl | | #1 | February 2023 | Archie Horror one-shot |
| Chilling Adventures Presents… Camp Pickens | | #1 | June 2023 | Archie Horror one-shot |
| Chilling Adventures Presents… Jinx: A Cursed Life | | #1 | May 2023 | Archie Horror one-shot |
| Chilling Adventures Presents: Jinx's Grim Fairy Tales | | #1 | October 2022 | Archie Horror one-shot |
| Chilling Adventures Presents… Madam Satan: Hell On Earth | | #1 | October 2023 | Archie Horror one-shot |
| Chilling Adventures Presents… Pop's Chocklit Shoppe of Horrors | | #1 | March 2023 | Archie Horror one-shot |
| Chilling Adventures Presents… Pop's Chocklit Shoppe of Horrors: Fresh Meat | | #1 | March 2024 | Archie Horror one-shot |
| Chilling Adventures Presents… Strange Science | | #1 | August 2023 | Archie Horror one-shot |
| Chilling Adventures Presents… The Cult of That Wilkin Boy | | #1 | April 2023 | Archie Horror one-shot |
| Chilling Adventures Presents… The Cult of That Wilkin Boy: Initiation | | #1 | April 2024 | Archie Horror one-shot |
| Chilling Adventures Presents… The Nine Lives of Salem | | #1 | April 2025 | Archie Horror one-shot |
| Chilling Adventures Presents… Truth or Dare | | #1 | September 2024 | Archie Horror one-shot |
| Chilling Adventures Presents… Weirder Mysteries | | #1 | September 2020 | Archie Horror one-shot |
| Chilling Adventures Presents… Welcome to Riverdale | | #1 | December 2023 | Archie Horror one-shot |
| Cosmo the Merry Martian | 1 | #1–6 | Sept. 1958 – Oct. 1959 | |
| Cosmo the Merry Martian | 2 | #1–5 | Jan. 2018 – July 2018 | A reboot of the original Cosmo series |
| Cosmo the Merry Martian | 3 | #1-5 | November 2019 - April 2020 | Third volume titled 'Cosmo: The Mighty Martian' |

== D ==
| Title | Vol. | Issues | Dates | Notes |
|---|---|---|---|---|
| Darling Love | | #1-11 | 1949 - 1952 | Close-Up Inc. imprint |
| Darling Romance | | #1-7 | 1949-1951 | Close-Up Inc. imprint |
| Double Life of Private Strong | | #1-2 | June 1959 – August 1959 | Archie Adventure Series imprint |
| Dilton's Strange Science | | #1-5 | May 1989 – May 1990 | Dilton's Strange Science #6 was announced as on-sale April 24th, 1990 in Archie Comics Digest #102 but was never published |

== E ==
| Title | Vol. | Issues | Dates | Notes |
|---|---|---|---|---|
| Everything's Archie | | #1–157 | May 1969 – Sept. 1991 | |

== F ==
| Title | Vol. | Issues | Dates | Notes |
|---|---|---|---|---|
| Franken 9 | | #0-5 | November 2017 - June 2018 | Digital release sci-fi series |
| Fear the Funhouse | | #1 | October 2022 | Archie Horror one-shot |

== G ==
| Title | Vol. | Issues | Dates | Notes |
|---|---|---|---|---|
| Ginger | | #1–10 | 1951 – Summer 1954 | |

== H ==
| Title | Vol. | Issues | Dates | Notes |
|---|---|---|---|---|
| Hangman Comics | | #2–8 | Spring 1942 – Fall 1943 | As MLJ Magazines; continues from Special Comics, and continued as Black Hood Comics |
| Harley & Ivy Meet Betty & Veronica | | #1–6 | September 2017 – February 2018 | Crossover with DC Comics characters Harley Quinn and Poison Ivy |

== J ==
| Title | Vol. | Issues | Dates | Notes |
|---|---|---|---|---|
| Jackpot Comics | | #1–9 | Spring 1941 – Spring 1943 | As MLJ Magazines; continued as Jolly Jingles |
| Jinx | 1 | #1-4 | May 2011 - March 2012 | Reboot of Li'l Jinx with high school aged characters |
| Jinx | 2 | N/A | June 2013 | Graphic novel sequel titled 'Jinx: Little Miss Steps' |
| Jolly Jingles | | #10–16 | Summer 1943 – Winter 1944/1945 | As MLJ Magazines; continues from Jackpot Comics |
| Josie and the Pussycats | 1 | #1–106 | Feb. 1963 – Oct. 1982 | Also published as Josie and She's Josie |
| Josie and the Pussycats | 2 | #1–9 | November 2016 – October 2017 | Relaunch of the core Archie series featuring updated and realistic looks for the characters. Part of "New Riverdale". |
| Josie and the Pussycats in Space | | #1-5 | October 2019 - February 2020 | Comixology original |
| Jughead | 1 | #127–352 | Dec. 1965 – June 1987 | Continues from Archie's Pal Jughead |
| Jughead | 2 | #353–397 | Aug. 1987 – May 1993 | Continues to Archie's Pal Jughead vol. 2 |
| Jughead | 3 | #1–16 | October 2015 – August 2017 | Relaunch of the core Archie series featuring updated and realistic looks for the characters. Part of "New Riverdale". |
| Jughead and Archie Double Digest | | #1–27 | June 2014 – Sept. 2017 | |
| Jughead and Friends Digest | | #1–38 | June 2005 – July 2010 | |
| Jughead as Captain Hero | | #1–7 | October 1966 – November 1977 | |
| Jughead's Baby Tales | | #1–2 | Spring 1994 – Winter 1994 | |
| Jughead's Diner | | #1–7 | April 1990 – April 1991 | |
| Jughead's Double Digest | | #1–200 | Oct. 1989 – Apr. 2014 | |
| Jughead's Fantasy | | #1-3 | August 1960 – December 1960 | Archie Adventure Series imprint |
| Jughead's Folly | | #1 | 1957 | One-shot comic featuring Jughead as Elvis. It is one of the rarest Archie comics and is popular due to the Elvis references. |
| Jughead's Jokes | | #1–78 | Aug. 1967 – Sept. 1982 | |
| Jughead's Pal Hot Dog | | #1–5 | Jan. – Oct. 1990 | |
| Jughead: The Hunger | | #1–13 | October 2017 – March 2019 | Archie Horror series |
| Jughead: The Hunger vs. Vampironica | | #1-5 | April 2019 - October 2019 | Archie Horror crossover between Jughead: The Hunger and Vampironica |
| Jughead's Time Police | 1 | #1–6 | July 1990 – May 1991 | |
| Jughead's Time Police | 2 | #1-5 | August 2019 - October 2019 | |
| Jughead with Archie Digest | | #1–200 | July 1974 – May 2005 | #1–2 titled Jughead with Archie plus Betty & Veronica & Reggie, Too |

== K ==
| Title | Vol. | Issues | Dates | Notes |
|---|---|---|---|---|
| Kardak the Mystic | | #1 | October 2024 | one-shot |
| Katy Keene | | #7–33 | Dec. 1984 – Jan. 1990 | Continues from Katy Keene Special |
| Katy Keene Comics | | #1–62 | 1949 – Jul. 1961 | Cover titled Adventures of Katy Keene for #50–53, and simply Katy Keene for #54–62 |
| Katy Keene Fashion Book | | #1–2 | 1955 – 1956 | Continued as Katy Keene Fashion Book Magazine |
| Katy Keene Fashion Book Magazine | | #13–23 | 1956 Summer – Winter 1958-59 | Continues from Katy Keene Fashion Book, with #3–12 skipped in numbering |
| Katy Keene Pin-Up Parade | | #1–15 | 1955 – Summer 1961 | |
| Katy Keene Special | | #2–6 | Sep. 1983 – Oct. 1984 | #1 was released under the Red Circle Comics imprint; continued as Katy Keene |
| Kevin Keller | 1 | #1–4 | June 2011 – December 2011 | |
| Kevin Keller | 2 | #1-15 | February 2012 - September 2014 | |
| Knuckles Archives | | #1-4 | September 2011 - April 2013 | Archie Action imprint |
| Knuckles the Echidna | | #1–32 | Apr. 1997 – Feb. 2000 | After this spin off series was cancelled, Ken Penders continued to write Knuckles the Echidna stories for Sonic Super Special #14 in 2000 and Sonic the Hedgehog that tied up dangling plots from the original series until 2003. It is since disowned by Archie Comics as of 2013 following a legal dispute. |

== L ==
| Title | Vol. | Issues | Dates | Notes |
|---|---|---|---|---|
| Lancelot Strong: The Shield | | #1-7 | June 1983 – July 1984 | with issue #3 (Dec. 1983), retitled Shield-Steel Sterling; with issue #4 (Jan. 1984), retitled Steel Sterling |
| Laugh Comics | 1 | #20–400 | Fall 1946 – April 1987 | Continues from Black Hood Comics |
| Laugh Comics | 2 | #1–29 | June 1987 – Aug. 1991 | |
| Laugh Comics Digest | | #1–200 | Aug. 1974 – April 2005 | |
| Laugh Comix | | #46–48 | Summer 1944 – Winter 1944/1945 | As MLJ Magazines; continues from Top-Notch Laugh Comics, and continued as Suzie Comics. |
| Life with Archie | | #1–286 | Sept. 1958 – July 1991 | |
| Life with Archie: The Married Life | | #1–37 | July 2010 – Sept 2014 | |
| Life with Kevin | | #1-5 | June 2016 – January 2018 | |
| Li'l Jinx | | #1, 12–16 | Nov. 1956 – Sept. 1957 | Continued as Little Archie in Animal Land |
| Li'l Jinx Giant Laughout | | #33–43 | Sept. 1971 – Nov. 1973 | Also the title of Archie Giant Series #176 (1970) and #185 (1971) |
| Little Archie | 1 | #1–180 | 1956 – Feb. 1983 | Titled The Adventures of Little Archie for much of its run. |
| Little Archie in Animal Land | | #1, 17–19 | Winter 1957/1958 – Summer 1958 | Numbering of issues #17–19 continues from L'il Jinx |
| Little Archie Mystery | | #1–2 | August 1963 – October 1963 | |
| Little Archie Digest | 1 | #1–47 | 1977 – 1990 | Annual series. Cancelled and replaced by The New Little Archie due to declining sales. |
| Little Archie Digest | 2 | #1-9 | May 1991 - August 1992 | Relaunched as The New Little Archie. Discontinued after the 9th issue due to extremely negative reception and is disowned by Archie Comics. |
| Little Archie Digest | 3 | #10-19 | 1993 - June 1997 | Comeback reprints by replacing the infamous relaunch. |

== M ==
| Title | Vol. | Issues | Dates | Notes |
|---|---|---|---|---|
| Mad House | | #95-97 | September 1974 – January 1975 | Continues from Mad House Glads; Red Circle Comics imprint |
| Madhouse Comics | | #98-130 | August 1975 – October 1982 | Continues from Mad House; #98–101 simply titled Madhouse in indicia |
| Mad House Ma-ad | | #67–72 | June 1968 – January 1969 | Continues from Archie's Madhouse |
| Mad House Glads | | #73–94 | May 1972 – August 1974 | Continues from Madhouse Ma-ad; Continues as Mad House |
| ManTech Robot Warriors | | #1–4 | September 1984 – May 1985 | |
| Mega Man | | #1–55 | April 2011 – December 2015 | |
| Mighty Comics | | #40-50 | November 1966 – October 1967 | Numbering continued from Fly-Man; cover titled Mighty Comics Presents and featured The Black Hood, The Shield, Steel Sterling, and The Web |
| The Mighty Crusaders | 1 | #1-7 | November 1965 – October 1966 | |
| The Mighty Crusaders | 2 | #1-13 | March 1983 – September 1985 | Red Circle Comics imprint; #1–3 titled All New Adventures of the Mighty Crusaders |
| The Mighty Crusaders | 3 | #1-4 | January 2018 – May 2018 | Dark Circle imprint |
| Mighty Mutanimals | 1 | #1–3 | May 1991 – July 1991 | Mini-series; cover titled Teenage Mutant Ninja Turtles Present Mighty Mutanimals |
| Mighty Mutanimals | 2 | #1–9 | April 1992 – June 1993 | Continued in a 7-part back-up series in Teenage Mutant Ninja Turtles Adventures #48–54 and a 3-part main series in #55–57. |

== N ==
| Title | Vol. | Issues | Dates | Notes |
|---|---|---|---|---|
| New Crusaders | | #1-6 | September 2012 – March 2013 | Red Circle Comics imprint |
| New Crusaders: Dark Tomorrow Special | | #1 | March 2015 | Dark Circle Comics one-shot featuring the Red Circle Comics versions of the characters |
| New Crusaders: Legacy | | #1 | July 2013 | Red Circle Comics imprint |

== O ==
| Title | Vol. | Issues | Dates | Notes |
|---|---|---|---|---|
| Original Shield | | #1-4 | April 1984 – October 1984 | Red Circle Comics imprint |

== P ==
| Title | Vol. | Issues | Dates | Notes |
|---|---|---|---|---|
| Pat the Brat | | #1–4, 15–33 | Summer 1955 – July 1959 | Continued as Pipsqueak |
| Pep Comics | | #1–411 | Jan. 1940 – March 1987 | #1–55 as MLJ Magazines |
| Pipsqueak | | #34–39 | September 1959 – July 1960 | Continued from Pat the Brat; Cover titled The Adventures of Pipsqueak |
| Princess Sally | | #1-3 | Feb. 1995 - April 1995 | 3-part miniseries. As a project by Ken Penders, Archie Comics legally disowned it as of 2013. |

== R ==
| Title | Vol. | Issues | Dates | Notes |
|---|---|---|---|---|
| Red Circle Sorcery | | #6-11 | April 1974 – February 1975 | Continued from Chilling Adventures in Sorcery; Red Circle imprint |
| Reggie and Me | 1 | #1–126 | 1950 – 1954; Aug. 1966 – Sept. 1980 | Originally titled as Archie's Rival, Reggie for issues #1–14 and Reggie for issues #15–18. Was renamed Reggie and Me beginning with issue #19. |
| Reggie and Me | 2 | #1–5 | December 2016 – May 2017 | Relaunch of the core Archie series featuring updated and realistic looks for the characters. Part of "New Riverdale". |
| Reggie's Revenge | | #1–3 | Spring 1994 – Spring 1995 | |
| Reggie's (Wise Guy) Jokes | | #1–55 | Aug. 1968 – Sept. 1980 | |
| Riverdale | 1 | #1–5 | 2017–2018 | |
| Riverdale Season 3 | 2 | #1-5 | March 2019 - July 2019 | |
| Riverdale Digest | | #1–7 | April 2017 – March 2018 | |
| Riverdale High | | #1–6 | Aug. 1990 – June 1991 | Continues to Archie's Riverdale High |
| Rogue State | | #1 | February 2019 | Digital release follow up to Franken 9 |

== S ==
| Title | Vol. | Issues | Dates | Notes |
|---|---|---|---|---|
| Sabrina the Teenage Witch | 1 | #1–77 | April 1971 – Jan. 1983 | |
| Sabrina the Teenage Witch | 2 | #1–32 | May 1997 – Dec. 1999 | Cancelled to make way for Sabrina |
| Sabrina the Teenage Witch | 3 | #1–104 | Jan. 2000 – Sept. 2009 | Titled Sabrina from issues #1–37. Was an adaptation of Sabrina: The Animated Series, in which the sorceress is a preteen who brews trouble with her two aunts and wise-cracking kitty, Salem. Was renamed Sabrina, the Teenage Witch with issue #38. |
| Sabrina the Teenage Witch | 4 | #1-10 | March 2019 - February 2021 | Reboot series, consisting of two five-issue miniseries, the second of which carries the subtitle Something Wicked. Part of New Riverdale |
| Sabrina the Teenage Witch | 5 | #1- | October 2026 - | Part of Archie Comics' partnership with Oni Press |
| Sabrina the Teenage Witch Holiday Special | | #1 | December 2023 | One-shot |
| Sam Hill: In The Crosshairs | | N/A | October 2015 | Dark Circle Comics imprint graphic novel released digitally |
| Sam Hill, Private Eye | | #1-6 | 1950-1952 | Close-Up Inc. imprint |
| Sam Hill, Private Eye meets Archie and the Gang | | #1 | May 2020 | Archie Comics 80th Anniversary Presents |
| Shadow | | #1-8 | August 1964 – September 1965 | Archie Adventure Series |
| Shield–Wizard Comics | | #1–13 | Fall 1940 – Winter 1943 | As MLJ Magazines |
| Sonic Archives | | #1-24 | November 2006 - February 2015 | Archie Action imprint |
| Sonic Boom | | #1–11 | Oct. 2014 – Sep. 2015 | Archie Action imprint |
| Sonic Select | | #1-10 | May 2008 – January 2015 | Archie Action imprint |
| Sonic the Hedgehog | | #0-3 | Feb. 1993 – May. 1993 | 4-part miniseries |
| Sonic the Hedgehog | | #1–290 | July 1993 – Feb. 2017 | This series and all other current Sonic titles by Archie Comics was officially announced to be cancelled in July 2017. Half of the stories and several additional characters are legally disowned by Archie Comics since 2013. Since its discontinuation, all stories are now out-of-print. |
| Sonic Universe | | #1–94 | Feb. 2009 – March. 2017 | This series and all other current Sonic titles by Archie Comics was officially announced to be cancelled in July 2017. |
| Sonic X | | #1–40 | Sep. 2005 – Jan. 2009 | Archie Action imprint |
| Special Comics | | #1 | Winter 1942 | As MLJ Magazines; continues as Hangman Comics |
| Stan Lee's Mighty 7 | | #1-3 | March 2012 – September 2012 | |
| Super Cops | | #1 | July 1974 | One-shot |
| Super Duck Comics | | #1–94 | Fall 1944–December 1960 | #1–5 as MLJ Magazines |
| Super Heroes vs. Super Villains | | #1 | July 1966 | One-shot featuring reprints |
| Suzie Comics | | #49–100 | Spring 1945 – Aug. 1954 | As MLJ Magazines for #49–52; continues from Laugh Comix |

== T ==
| Title | Vol. | Issues | Dates | Notes |
|---|---|---|---|---|
| Tales Calculated to Drive You Bats | 1 | #1-7 | November 1961 – November 1962 | Archie Adventure Series imprint |
| Tales Calculated to Drive You Bats | 2 | #1 | 1966 | Giant size |
| Tales from Riverdale Digest | | #1–39 | July 2005 – Aug. 2010 | |
| Teenage Mutant Ninja Turtles Adventures | | #1–72 | Aug. 1988 – Oct. 1995 | |
| That Wilkin Boy | | #1–52 | Jan. 1969 – Oct. 1982 | |
| The Adventures of Bayou Billy | | #1-5 | September 1989 – June 1990 | Archie Adventure Series imprint |
| The Best Archie Comic Ever | | #1 | June 2022 | Anthology oneshot |
| The Black Hood | 1 | #1-3 | June 1983 – October 1983 | Red Circle Comics imprint |
| The Black Hood | 2 | #1-11 | February 2015 — June 2016 | Dark Circle Comics imprint |
| The Black Hood | 3 | #1-5 | October 2016 – June 2017 | Dark Circle Comics imprint |
| The Comet | | #1-2 | October 1983 – December 1983 | 6 issue miniseries cancelled before completion |
| The Fox | 1 | #1-5 | October 2013 – March 2014 | Red Circle Comics imprint |
| The Fox | 2 | #1-5 | October 2016 – June 2017 | Dark Circle Comics |
| The Fox: Family Values | | #1 | May 2022 | One-shot |
| The Golden Pelican | | #1-6 | November 2018 - December 2019 | Digital release action comic |
| The Hangman | | #1-4 | November 2015 – October 2016 | Dark Circle Comics imprint |
| The Jughead Jones Digest Magazine | | #1–100 | June 1977 – May 1996 | |
| The New Archies | | #1–22 | Oct. 1987 – May 1990 | |
| The Return of Chilling Adventures in Sorcery | | #1 | December 2022 | Archie Horror one-shot |
| The Shield | | #1-4 | October 2015 – November 2016 | Dark Circle Comics imprint |
| The Wicked Trinity | | #1 | August 2024 | Archie Horror one-shot |
| Top-Notch Comics | | #1–27 | Dec. 1939 – May 1942 | As MLJ Magazines; continued as Top-Notch Laugh Comics |
| Top-Notch Laugh Comix | | #28–45 | Jul. 1942 – May 1944 | As MLJ Magazines; continued from Top-Notch Comics, and continued as Laugh Comix |

== V ==
| Title | Vol. | Issues | Dates | Notes |
|---|---|---|---|---|
| Vampironica | 1 | #1-5 | March 2018 - December 2018 | Archie Horror series |
| Vampironica | 2 | #1-4 | December 2019 - June 2020 | Archie Horror series |
| Veronica | | #1–210 | April 1989 – Dec. 2011 | |

== W ==
| Title | Vol. | Issues | Dates | Notes |
|---|---|---|---|---|
| Wilbur Comics | | #1–90 | Summer 1944 – Oct. 1965 | As MLJ Magazines for #1–6 |
| The Wild West C.O.W.-Boys of Moo Mesa | 1 | #1–3 | December 1991 – February 1993 | Mini-series |
| The Wild West C.O.W.-Boys of Moo Mesa | 2 | #1–3 | March 1993 – July 1993 | |
| World of Archie | | #1–22 | Aug. 1992 – March 1997 | |
| World of Archie Jumbo Comics Digest | | #1–current | Oct. 2010 – present | |

== Y ==
| Title | Vol. | Issues | Dates | Note |
|---|---|---|---|---|
| Your Pal Archie | | #1–5 | July 2017 – December 2017 | |

== Z ==
| Title | Vol. | Issues | Dates | Note |
|---|---|---|---|---|
| Zen Intergalactic Ninja | 1 | #1–3 | May 1992 – July 1992 | Mini-series |
| Zen Intergalactic Ninja | 2 | #1–3 | September 1992 – December 1992 | |
| Zip Comics | | #1–47 | Feb. 1940 – Summer 1944 | As MLJ Magazines |
