= Arquibaldo e sua Turma =

- Cover of Arquibaldo e sua Turma #4 (1975).

Publication information
- Publisher: Vecchi
- Schedule: Monthly
- Format: Ongoing series
- Genre: Comedy
- Publication date: May 1975 – December 1976
- No. of issues: 11
- Main character(s): Archie Andrews; Betty Cooper; Veronica Lodge; Jughead Jones; Reggie Mantle

Arquibaldo e sua Turma (English: Arquibaldo's Gang) was a comic book, released in 1975 by Brazilian publisher Vecchi. The comic book published stories of titles already released by Archie Comics, such as Archie, Archie and Me, Archie's Girls Betty and Veronica, Archie's TV Laugh-Out, Reggie and Me, Sabrina, the Teenage Witch and others. It was the second publication of comics with licensed characters from Archie Comics in Brazil, after Orbis's between 1954–1955, titled Frajola, with 23 issues. Arquibaldo e sua Turma have only 11 issues published, being the shortest publication in the country. First published May 1975 and last published December 1976.

The characters in this comic had their names changed, Archie Andrews was called "Arquibaldo". Jughead Jones had his name changed to "Moleza" and Archie's rival Reggie Mantle was called "Rick". Other characters like Betty Cooper and Veronica Lodge have just their names translated from English to Portuguese.
