= 1987 in comics =

Notable events of 1987 in comics.

== Events and publications ==
=== Year overall ===
- Independent publishers continue to enter the comics arena including Amazing, CFW Enterprises, Imperial Comics, Matrix Graphic Series, and New Comics Group. Conversely, ACE Comics, Mad Dog Graphics, Silverwolf Comics, Solson Publications, Spotlight Comics, and Wonder Comics all cease publishing.
- Formation of the Independent Comic Publishers Association (ICPA), to promote excellence in and further public awareness of this growing segment of the comic book industry. The appearance of the ICPA logo on a comic is meant as a symbol of quality in the small press, black-and-white market.
- DC Comics reboots three of its core characters and titles, with the introduction of The Flash vol. 2, Superman vol. 2, and Wonder Woman vol. 2.
- The "British Invasion" begins. Following the success of Alan Moore and Dave Gibbons' Watchmen, DC Comics recruits British creators such as Alan Grant, Cam Kennedy, David Lloyd, and John Wagner. Meanwhile, Marvel's Epic Comics imprint hires Pat Mills and Kevin O'Neill to create their Marshal Law limited series.
- Archie Comics cancels four long-running titles, Archie and Me, Archie at Riverdale High, Laugh Comics, and Pep Comics; immediately relaunching Laugh vol. 2 and Betty and Veronica vol. 2.
- Peter Parker marries Mary Jane Watson in Amazing Spider-Man Annual #21, written by Jim Shooter and David Michelinie, with art by Paul Ryan and Vince Colletta.
- Quest for Dreams Lost, an anthology of short comics by independent publishers featuring such characters and titles as the Teenage Mutant Ninja Turtles, The Trollords, The Silent Invasion, and Tales From The Aniverse. Published by the Literacy Volunteers of Chicago.
- Violent Cases, by Neil Gaiman and Dave McKean, published by Escape Books.
- The Pitt, a Marvel Graphic Novel taking place in Marvel Comics' New Universe.
- Lords of the Ultra-Realm Special, by Doug Moench and Pat Broderick, published by DC Comics.
- Sam & Max: Freelance Police Special Edition, by Steve Purcell, published by Fishwrap Productions.
- IPC Magazines's comic assets were sold to Robert Maxwell. They were renamed to Fleetway.
- Strip AIDS, by various authors, care of Don Mela (Willyprods / Small Time Ink).

=== January ===
- January 1: At the start of the year, Tintin launches the first of 52 illustrations made Bob De Groot and Turk, published on a weekly basis throughout the year. All 52 images together form a long streetview, 15 metres in length.
- January 2: The first episode of René Windig and Eddie de Jong's Heinz is published. It will run until 2000, then return for a brief period between 2004 and 2006.
- January 23: Comics artist Willy Vandersteen is a guest in the TV show In De Hoofdrol, presented by Mies Bouwman, where, among other surprises, he is given the first copy of a brand new Suske en Wiske story, De Parel in de Lotusbloem, which his successor Paul Geerts had made in secret for him.
- With issue #424, DC Comics' Adventures of Superman debuts, continuing the numbering of Superman.
- S.P.A.D.S. by William Vance and Jean Van Hamme (Dargaud).

=== February ===
- "Batman: Year One" begins in DC Comics' Batman #404 (continuing through Batman #407). Written by Frank Miller, with art by David Mazzucchelli, "Batman: Year One" recounts the beginning of Bruce Wayne's career as Batman and Jim Gordon's with the Gotham City Police Department. It is one of the first examples of the "limited series within a series" format that is now prevalent in American comic books.
- The "Gods and Mortals" story arc begins in DC Comics' Wonder Woman vol. 2, the first arc featuring the rebooted incarnation of Wonder Woman following Crisis on Infinite Earths. Written by Greg Potter and George Pérez, drawn by Pérez and Bruce Patterson.
- Doctor Strange vol. 2, with issue #87, cancelled by Marvel.
- With issue #161, Archie cancels Archie and Me.
- With issue #113, Archie cancels Archie at Riverdale High.
- Aristocratic Xtraterrestrial Time-Traveling Thieves (ongoing) #1 (Comics Interview), by Henry Vogel and Mark Propst.

=== March ===
- "The Universo Project" story arc begins in DC Comics' Legion of Super-Heroes #32. Written by Paul Levitz and pencilled by Greg LaRocque, the story arc concludes in Legion of Super-Heroes #35.
- Fantastic Four #300: Johnny Storm marries "Alicia Masters" — actually Lyja, a Skrull who had abducted and replaced Masters to serve as a spy. (Marvel Comics)
- Pep Comics, with issue #411, is cancelled by Archie Comics.
- With issue #288, DC cancels G.I. Combat.
- Swords of the Swashbucklers, with issue #12, is cancelled by Epic Comics.
- Thundercats #1. (Marvel UK)
- In the Italian magazine Corto Maltese, the first chapter of Isola gentile (The gentle island), by Sergio Toppi is prepublished. An adventure set in the Malay Archipelago. In the same issue the Corto Maltese story The secret rose, by Hugo Pratt is prepublished, an adventure inspired by alchemy and esotericism, where the hero meets Herman Hesse.
- In the Italian magazine Comic Art, debut of La bionda (The blonde woman), by Franco Saudelli, adventures of a female thief mixing mystery, science-fiction and bondage eroticism. and of the spy series Rudy X, by Rinaldo Traini and Rodolfo Torti.

=== April ===
- April 1: in Pif Gadget, the 95th Lucly Luke adventure, Nitroglicerine, by Morris and Lo Hartog van Banda, is prepublished.
- With issue #400, Archie cancels Laugh Comics (vol. 1).
- With issue #347, Archie cancels Archie's Girls Betty and Veronica (vol. 1).
- The Son of the Sun, by Don Rosa, on Uncle Scrooge; debut of the author in the Disney comics.
- April 15: After nine years at the helm, Marvel Comics editor-in-chief Jim Shooter is fired, succeeded by Tom DeFalco.

=== May ===
- May 5: in Spirou, Spirou à New York, by Tome and Jamy, is prepublished.
- Don Rosa's Uncle Scrooge story Nobody's business is prepublished.

=== June ===
- June 27: British comic artist Leo Baxendale, who sued his former publisher DC Thomson to receive financial compensation for his work, reaches an out-of-court settlement with DC Thomson, which hands the rights of his characters back to him.
- "Batman: Year Two" begins in DC Comics' Detective Comics #575 (continuing through Detective Comics #578). Written by Mike W. Barr, with art by (among others) Todd McFarlane, "Batman: Year Two" follows on the success of "Batman: Year One".
- Le tigri volanti by Luigi Mignacco and Franco Bignotti (Bonelli); Mister No's past in the Flying Tigers and the origin of his nickname are revealed.
- La diabolica invenzione by Alfredo Castelli and Giampiero Casertano; first apparition of Altrove (“Elsewhere”), the secret bases of American government for the study of magic and paranormal phenomena, recurring in Martin Mystere and other Bonelli series.
- Alfa e Omega by Tiziano Sclavi and Corrado Roi (Bonelli, Dylan Dog series)
- First issue of the anthological magazine Tutto West (Bonelli), reprinting some almost forgotten Wester comics published by the house in the Fifties.

=== July ===
- July 4 - September 6: In Ghent, Belgium, museum curator Jan Hoet organizes an exhibition about European comics titled Kunst en Grafische Vernieuwing in het Europees Beeldverhaal (Art and Graphic Innovation in European Comics), exhibiting original artwork by various Belgian, French, Swiss, Italian, Polish and Dutch comics artists.
- Gumby's Summer Fun Special #1, by Bob Burden and Art Adams, published by Comico.
- After 13 years of quarterly publication, Métal Hurlant is cancelled.
- Mythological menagerie, by Don Rosa, on Walt Disney's Comics and Stories.

=== August ===
- August 9: In Topolino, L'inferno di Paperino (Donald's inferno), by Giulio Chierchini is prepublished, a parody of the Dante's inferno; it's a follow-up to the legendary Mickey's inferno, by Guido Martina.
- August 30: in Topolino, Giorgio Cavazzano’s Casablanca, is prepublished; it's a parody of the cult movie interpreted by the characters of the Mouse universe,
- "The Greatest Hero of Them All" story arc begins in DC Comics' Superman (vol. 2) #8, Action Comics #591 and Legion of Super-Heroes (vol. 3) #37. Written by Paul Levitz and John Byrne, and pencilled by Byrne, Greg LaRocque, and Mike DeCarlo, the story arc is DC's first attempt to correct the inconsistencies in Legion history created when Byrne removed the original Superboy from mainstream DC continuity in the Man of Steel limited series. (Continues in September's Legion of Super-Heroes #38.)
- Green Arrow: The Longbow Hunters by Mike Grell (DC Comics)
- With issue #14, Eclipse cancels Alien Encounters.
- The Egg of Darkness, written by Serge Le Tendre and drawn by Régis Loisel, is published by Dargaud; fourth and last episode of The Quest for the Time-Bird.
- In Italy, first issue of the magazines Magic boy and Magic girl, published by Matell as a promotional vehicle for its toys.

=== September ===
- Joe Matt releases the first installment of his autobiographical comic series Peepshow.
- The first episode of Mark Parisi's Off the Mark is published.
- The "Challenge of the Gods" story arc begins in DC Comics' Wonder Woman #8, written by George Pérez and Len Wein, and drawn by Pérez. (It continues through issue #15.)

=== October ===
- October 14: in Il giornalino, the series La pattuglia ecologica (The echo-patrol) by Mauro Cominelli and Mario Rossi, makes its debut; it has a group of five environment's defenders as heroes.
- October 24: The Judge Dredd storyline "Oz", written by John Wagner and Alan Grant, begins in Fleetway's 2000 AD (running for 26 episodes to April 16, 1988).
- The Spider-Man storyline "Kraven's Last Hunt" (also known as "Fearful Symmetry") begins in Web of Spider-Man #31, The Amazing Spider-Man #293, and Spectacular Spider-Man #131. Written by J.M. DeMatteis and Mike Zeck, the storyline concludes in the November issues Web of Spider-Man #32, Amazing Spider-Man #294, and Spectacular Spider-Man #132.
- With issue #18, DC cancels Electric Warrior.
- With issue #12, Marvel cancels the New Universe title Kickers inc.
- With issue #24, Eclipse cancels Scout.
- In the Italian magazine Comic art, the first chapter of Alias is prepublished, an adventure series set in 17th-century Amsterdam, written by Renato Queirolo and drawn by Anna Brandoli.
- Asterix and the magic carpet, by Uderzo is published.
- Terror over Kansas, by Jean Michel Charlier and Colin Wilson, fifth chapter of La jeunesse de Blueberry; second and last chapter of the Quantrill saga.
- La citè di dieu perdu (The lost god's city) by Jean Van Hamme and Grzegorz Rosiński (Le Lombard).

=== November ===
- With issue #7, DC's Justice League becomes Justice League International.
- Fit to be pied and Recalled wreck, by Don Rosa, on Walt Disney's Comics and Stories.
- First issue of Marvel Masterworks.
- Ric Hochet contre Sherlock by André-Paul Duchâteau and Tibet (Le Lombard)

=== December ===
- December 5: Erika Raven is the first female comic artist to receive the Bronzen Adhemar award.
- Tales of the Legion of Super-Heroes, with issue #354, is cancelled by DC.
- With issue #17, DC cancels Hawkman vol. 2.
- Batman: Son of the Demon by Mike W. Barr and Jerry Bringham (DC Comics)
- Cash flow, by Don Rosa, on Uncle Scrooge.
- In Italy, first issue of the magazine Zio Paperone (Mondadori, then Disney Italia); it reprints integrally the Carl Barks production, later extending to other Disney authors.

=== Specific date unknown ===
- Gerrit de Jager wins the Stripschapprijs. Martin Lodewijk and Don Lawrence receive the Jaarprijs voor Bijzondere Verdiensten (nowadays the P. Hans Frankfurtherprijs).
- Toon van Driel's celebrity comic about comedian André van Duin debuts in De Telegraaf, where it will run until 2005.

== Deaths ==
=== January ===
- January 2: Jacques Laplaine, aka J. Lap, French comics artist (Le Petit President, Monsieur Cloche, the Tintin parody Tintin à la recherche du veau d'or), dies at age 65.
- January 13: Ed Kuekes, American cartoonist and comics artist (Alice in Wonderland, Do You Believe?), dies at age 85.
- January 23: E. Nelson Bridwell, American comic book writer (DC Comics, Mad), dies from lung cancer at age 55.
- January 23: Dow O. Walling, American comics artist and TV presenter (Skeets, Jimmy's Jobs), dies at age 84.
- January 27: Rod Ruth, American illustrator and comics artist (The Toodles), dies at age 74.

=== February ===
- February 2: Ken Reid, British comics artist (Fudge the Elf, Roger the Dodger, Jonah, Faceache), dies at age 67.
- February 12: Angela Giussani, Italian comics writer (Diabolik), dies at age 64.
- February 20: Wayne Boring, American comics artist (worked on Superman), dies at age 81.
- February 20: Edgar P. Jacobs, Belgian comics artist (Le Rayon U, Blake and Mortimer) dies at age 82.
- February 22: Andy Warhol, American painter, music producer and film director (made sequential and occasional comics-inspired art), dies at age 58.
- February 27: Bill Holman, American comics artist (Smokey Stover), dies at age 83.
- February 27: Darrell McClure, American comics artist (continued Little Annie Rooney and Room and Board), dies at age 84.
- February 28: Roland Moisan, French caricaturist, journalist and comics artist (worked on Zoé, Enfant Terrible), dies at age 79.

=== March ===
- March 22: Ib Steinaa, Danish animator and comics artist (Disney comics, assisted on Ferd'nand and Lise og Lasse), dies at age 60.

=== April ===
- April 13: Joe Colquhoun, British comics artist (Charley's War, Johnny Red, Kid Chameleon, worked on Roy of the Rovers), dies of a heart attack at age 60.
- April 19: Milt Kahl, American animator (Walt Disney Company), dies at age 78.

=== May ===
- May 30: Al Shapiro, aka "A. Jay", American comics artist (Harry Chess), dies at age 55 from AIDS.
- May 31: Hugh Laidman, American illustrator, painter and comics artist (Middle Class Animals), dies at age 63.

=== June ===
- June 12: Carlo Boscarato, Italian comics artist (Larry Yuma), dies at age 61.
- June 12: Eugen Semitjov, Swedish comics artist, journalist and writer (Allan Kämpe), dies at age 64.
- June 25: Bram Ohm, Dutch illustrator and comics artist (Dikkie Dapper, Miepie), dies at age 81.

=== July ===
- July 5: Jayme Cortez, Portuguese-Brazilian comic artist (Os 2 Amigos), dies at age 60.

=== August ===
- August 22: Henk Tol, Dutch painter, illustrator and comics artist (Bearend Barebyt), dies at age 56.

=== September ===
- September 8: Hans van Gorkom, Dutch comic artist (Hikkie, assisted on Olle Kapoen), dies at age 58.
- September 30: Alfred Bester, American novelist and comics writer (wrote The Phantom, Mandrake the Magician, Superman, Green Lantern during the mid-1940s), dies at age 73.

=== October ===
- October 5: Ed Stevenson, American illustrator and comics artist (Ted Powers), dies at age 91.
- Specific date unknown: Radu Duldurescu, Romanian comics artist (Cutu si Miau, Mache Fantomas, Pestera Aurie, Fix Contra Vix, Muky si Mache), dies from pancreatic cancer at age 60.

=== November ===
- November 10: Pop Momand, American comics artist (Keeping Up with the Joneses), dies at age 101.
- November 11: John N. Carey, American animator and comics artist (Disney comics, Hanna-Barbera comics, Woody Woodpecker comics), dies at age 72.
- November 24: Anton Pieck, Dutch illustrator, painter and comics artist (published in Zonneschijn), dies at age 92.

=== December ===
- December 13: George Wunder, American comics artist (continued Terry and the Pirates), dies at age 75.
- December 14: Copi, Argentinean-French comics artist (La Femme Assise), dies at age 48 from AIDS.
- December 26: Angelo Bioletto, Italian comics artist (Disney comics, L' Inferno di Topolino), dies at age 81.
- December 29: Raeburn Van Buren, American comics artist (Abbie an' Slats), dies at age 96.

=== Specific date unknown ===
- Bernie Aalmeon, French-Egyptian comics artist (Samir), dies at age 68 or 69.
- Pedro Alférez González, Spanish comics artist (Mascarita, continued Inspector Dan, Fix und Foxi), dies at age 51 or 52.
- Huang Yao, Chinese comics artist (Niu Bi Zi), dies at age 69 or 70.
- Lenn Redman, American caricaturist, animator, novelist, poet, illustrator, comics artist, cartoonist and activist (worked on Mary Worth), dies at age 74 or 75.
- Vicq, Belgian comics artist (Taka Takata, Korrigan, Les Frères Bross), dies in a hospital at age 50 or 51, after having become a reclusive person the past years. His death is only noticed several years later.

== Exhibitions and shows ==
- January 6 – February 28: "Robert Williams: Messages from a Drunken Broom" (Psychedelic Solution Gallery, New York City)
- June–September: "Comic Iconoclasm" (Institute of Contemporary Arts, London) — curated by Sheena Wagstaff — American artist Jerry Kearns exhibits a work "simply spliced together [of] panels by Bernie Wrightson and Brian Bolland ... and made them big." Exhibition later travels to Douglas Hyde Gallery, Dublin; Cornerhouse Gallery, Manchester; and a European tour

== Conventions ==
- January 29–February 1: Angoulême International Comics Festival (Angoulême, France) — 14th annual festival
- February 22: Great Eastern Conventions (Budget Motor Lodge, Route 73, Mount Laurel, New Jersey) — c. 175 attendees; five dealers and about 25 exhibitor tables
- May 2–3: Wonderful World of Comics Convention (Oakland Convention Center, Oakland, California) — First annual staging of the convention (later to be known as WonderCon), founded by San Jose native John Barrett, co-owner of the retail chain Comics and Comix
- June: Heroes Convention (Charlotte, North Carolina)
- June 27–28: Creation Convention '87 I (Roosevelt Hotel, New York City)
- July 3–5: Chicago Comicon (Ramada O'Hare, Rosemont, Illinois)
- July 31–August 2: Atlanta Fantasy Fair (Omni Hotel & Georgia World Congress Center, Atlanta, Georgia) — official guests include Adam West, Caroline Munro, Robert Bloch, Boris Vallejo, Kelly Freas, Jennifer Roberson, and Tom Savini
- August 6–9: San Diego Comic-Con (Convention and Performing Arts Center and Holiday Inn, San Diego, California) — 5,000 attendees; official guests: Harlan Ellison, Miguel Ferrer, Ward Kimball, B. Kliban, Françoise Mouly, Bill Mumy, Mike Peters, Robert Silverberg, Art Spiegelman, and Bernie Wrightson
- September 5–6: UKCAC87 (The Institute of Education, London, England) — guests include Will Eisner, Gil Kane, John Byrne, John Totleben, Steve Bissette, Wendy Pini, Richard Pini, Ron Smith, John Totleben, Steve Bissette, Alan Grant, Dave Gibbons, Bill Sienkiewicz, Dave Sim, Paul Duncan, Martin Crocknell, and Carlos Ezquerra; presentation of the Eagle Awards
- September 5–6: Dragon*Con (Pierremont Plaza Hotel, Atlanta, Georgia) — first annual staging of the multigenre convention. 1,400 attendees; Official guests: Michael Moorcock (his first convention appearance in twelve years), Robert Asprin, Lynn Abbey, Robert Adams, Richard "Lord British" Garriott, Gary Gygax, and Toastmaster Brad Strickland
- September 25–27: OrlandoCon (International Inn, Orlando, Florida)
- November: Mid-Ohio Con (Ohio) — guest of honor: Dave Sim; other guests: Kevin Eastman, Peter Laird, John Ostrander, Denys Cowan, Mike Grell, Carol Kalish
- November 27–29: Creation '87 II (New York Penta Hotel, New York City)
- November 27–29: Dallas Fantasy Fair (Marriott Park Central, Dallas, Texas) — guests include Harvey Kurtzman, Jaime Hernandez, Denis Kitchen, Gilbert Hernandez, Don Simpson, Steve Rude, Kenneth Smith, Brad W. Foster, and Doug Potter

== Awards ==
=== Eagle Awards ===
Presented in 1988 for comics published in 1987. Distributed on Saturday, September 24, 1988, at UKCAK88, The Institute of Education, London WC1.

- Roll of Honour: Pat Mills

==== American Section ====
- Favourite Writer: Alan Moore
- Favourite Artist (Penciler): Bill Sienkiewicz
- Favourite Inker: Terry Austin
- Favourite Comicbook: Watchmen (DC)
- Favourite Graphic Novel: Daredevil: Love and War (Marvel)
- Favourite Character: Batman (DC)
- Favourite Group or Team: Justice League International (DC)
- Favourite Villain: The Joker (DC)
- Favourite Supporting Character: Abigail Arcane Cable, from Swamp Thing (DC)
- Character Most Worthy of Own Title: Rorschach, from Watchmen (DC)
- Favourite Single or Continued Story: Batman #404-407: Year One (DC)
- Favourite New Comic Title: Marshal Law (Epic)
- Favourite Comic Cover: Wonder Woman #10, by George Pérez
- Favourite Specialist Comics Publication: Amazing Heroes

==== British Section ====
- Favourite Artist: Bryan Talbot
- Favourite Writer: Pat Mills
- Favourite Comic: 2000 AD
- Favourite Comic Album: Violent Cases, by Neil Gaiman and Dave McKean (Escape Books)
- Favourite Character: Luther Arkwright
- Favourite Villain: Torquemada, from Nemesis the Warlock
- Favourite Supporting Character: Ukko the Dwarf (from Sláine)
- Character Most Worthy of Own Title: Halo Jones
- Favourite Single or Continued Story: 2000 AD #535-550: Zenith
- Favourite New Comic: The Adventures of Luther Arkwright (Valkyrie Press)
- Favourite Comic Cover: The Adventures of Luther Arkwright #1, by Bryan Talbot
- Favourite Specialist Comics Publication: Speakeasy

=== Kirby Awards ===
- Best Single Issue: Batman: The Dark Knight Returns #1, by Frank Miller, Klaus Janson, and Lynn Varley (DC Comics)
- Best Continuing Series: Swamp Thing, by Alan Moore, Steve Bissette, and John Totleben (DC)
- Best Black & White Series: Cerebus by Dave Sim (Aardvark-Vanaheim)
- Best Finite Series: Watchmen, by Alan Moore and Dave Gibbons (DC)
- Best New Series: Watchmen, by Alan Moore and Dave Gibbons (DC)
- Best Graphic Album: Batman: The Dark Knight Returns, by Frank Miller and Klaus Janson (DC)
- Best Artist: Bill Sienkiewicz, for Elektra: Assassin (Marvel Comics)
- Best Writer: Alan Moore, for Watchmen (DC)
- Best Writer/Artist: Alan Moore and Dave Gibbons, for Watchmen (DC)
- Best Art Team: Frank Miller, Klaus Janson, and Lynn Varley, for Batman: The Dark Knight Returns (DC)
- Hall of Fame:
  - Carl Barks
  - Will Eisner
  - Jack Kirby

=== Eisner Awards ===
Presented in 1988 for comics published in 1987:

- Best Single Issue/Single Story: Gumby's Summer Fun Special #1, by Bob Burden and Art Adams (Comico)
- Best Black-and-White Series: Concrete, by Paul Chadwick (Dark Horse Comics)
- Best Finite Series/Limited Series: Watchmen, by Alan Moore and Dave Gibbons (DC Comics)
- Best New Series: Concrete, by Paul Chadwick (Dark Horse)
- Best Graphic Album: Watchmen, by Alan Moore and Dave Gibbons (DC)
- Best Writer: Alan Moore, Watchmen (DC)
- Best Writer/Artist: Alan Moore and Dave Gibbons, Watchmen (DC)
- Best Artist/Penciller/Inker or Penciller/Inker Team: Steve Rude, Nexus (First Comics)
- Best Art Team: Steve Rude, Willie Blyberg and Ken Steacy, Space Ghost Special (Comico)
- Bob Clampett Humanitarian Award: June Foray
- Will Eisner Award Hall of Fame: Milton Caniff

=== Harvey Awards ===
Presented in 1988 at the Chicago Comicon for comics published in 1987:

- Best Writer: Alan Moore, for Watchmen (DC Comics)
- Best Artist or Penciller: Dave Gibbons, for Watchmen (DC)
- Best Cartoonist (Writer/Artist): Paul Chadwick, for Concrete (Dark Horse Comics)
- Best Inker: Al Williamson, for Daredevil (Marvel Comics)
- Best Letterer: Ken Bruzenak, for American Flagg (First Comics)
- Best Colorist: John Higgins, for Watchmen (DC)
- Special Award for Excellence in Production/Presentation: Watchmen, by Alan Moore and Dave Gibbons, (DC)
- Best New Series: Concrete, by Paul Chadwick (Dark Horse Comics)
- Best Continuing or Limited Series: Watchmen, by Alan Moore and Dave Gibbons (DC)
- Best Single Issue or Story: Watchmen #9: "The Darkness of Mere Being", by Alan Moore and Dave Gibbons (DC)
- Best Graphic Album: Watchmen, by Alan Moore and Dave Gibbons (DC)
- Best American Edition of Foreign Material: Moebius album series, by Jean "Moebius" Giraud (Marvel Comics)
- Best Domestic Reprint Project: The Spirit, by Will Eisner (Kitchen Sink Press)

== First issues by title ==
=== DC Comics ===
Captain Atom

Release: March. Writer: Cary Bates. Artists: Pat Broderick and Bob Smith.

Doom Patrol vol 2.

Release: October. Writer: Paul Kupperberg. Artists: Steve Lightle and Gary Martin.

The Flash vol. 2

Release: June. Writer: Mike Baron. Artists: Jackson Guice and Larry Mahlstedt.

Justice League

Release: May. Writers: Keith Giffen and J.M. DeMatteis. Artists: Keith Giffen, Kevin Maguire, and Terry Austin.

The Question

Release: April. Writer: Dennis O'Neil. Artists: Denys Cowan and Rick Magyar.

The Shadow

Release: August. Writer: Andrew Helfer. Artist: Bill Sienkiewicz.

Spectre

Release: April. Writer: Doug Moench. Artists: Gene Colan and Steve Mitchell.

Suicide Squad

Release: May. Writer: John Ostrander. Artists: Luke McDonnell and Karl Kesel.

Superman vol. 2

Release: January. Writer: John Byrne. Artists: John Byrne and Terry Austin.

Wasteland

Release: December. Writer: John Ostrander and Del Close. Artists: David Lloyd, William Messner-Loebs, and Don Simpson.

Wonder Woman vol. 2

Release: February. Writers: Greg Potter and George Pérez. Artists: George Pérez and Bruce Patterson.

Young All-Stars

Release: June. Writers: Roy Thomas and Dann Thomas. Artists: Michael Bair and Brian Murray.

==== Limited series ====
Doc Savage (4 issues)

Release: November. Writer: Dennis O'Neil. Artists: Adam Kubert and Andy Kubert.

Doctor Fate (4 issues)

Release: July. Writer: J. M. DeMatteis. Artists: Keith Giffen and Dave Hunt.

Green Arrow: The Longbow Hunters (3 issues)

Release: August. Writer/Artist: Mike Grell.

Outcasts (12 issues)

Release: October. Writers: John Wagner and Alan Grant. Artists: Cam Kennedy and Steve Montano.

Phantom Stranger (4 issues)

Release: October. Writer: Paul Kupperberg. Artists: Mike Mignola and P. Craig Russell.

Silverblade (12 issues)

Release: October. Writer: Cary Bates. Artists: Gene Colan and Klaus Janson.

Slash Maraud (6 issues)

Release: November. Writer: Doug Moench. Artist: Paul Gulacy and .

Sonic Disruptors (7 issues; originally solicited for 12)

Release: December. Writer: Mike Baron. Artists: Barry Crain and John Nyberg.

World of Krypton (4 issues)

Release: December. Writer: John Byrne. Artists: Mike Mignola and Rick Bryant.

=== Marvel Comics ===
Action Force

Release: March 8 by Marvel UK. Reprints of Marvel's G.I. Joe comic.

SilverHawks

Release: August by Star Comics. Writer: Stephen Perry. Artists: Mike Witherby and James Sanders III.

Silver Surfer

Release: July. Writer: Steve Englehart. Artists: Marshall Rogers and Joe Rubinstein.

Solo Avengers

Release: December. Writer: Tom DeFalco. Artists: Mark D. Bright and Joe Rubinstein.

Strange Tales vol. 2

Release: April. Writer: Bill Mantlo. Artist: Bret Blevins.

Visionaries: Knights of the Magical Light

Release: November by Star Comics. Writer: Jim Salicrup. Artists: Mark Bagley and Romeo Tanghal.

==== Limited series ====
Comet Man (6 issues)

Release: February. Writers: Bill Mumy and Miguel Ferrer. Artists: Kelley Jones and Gerry Talaoc.

Fallen Angels (8 issues)

Release: April. Writer: Jo Duffy. Artist: Kerry Gammill.

Marshal Law (6 issues)

Release: October by Epic Comics. Writer: Pat Mills. Artist: Kevin O'Neill.

The Transformers: Headmasters (4 issues)

Release: July. Writer: Bob Budiansky. Artists: Frank Springer and Ian Akin & Brian Garvey.

The X-Men vs. The Avengers (4 issues)

Release: May. Writer: Roger Stern. Artists: Marc Silvestri and Joe Rubinstein.

=== Other publishers ===
The American

Release: June by Dark Horse Comics. Writer: Mark Verheiden. Artist: Chris Warner.

The Original Astro Boy

Release: September by Now Comics. Writer: Mike Dimpsey. Artist: Ken Steacy.

Betty and Veronica (vol. 2)

Release: June by Archie Comics. Artist: Dan DeCarlo.

Concrete

Release: April by Dark Horse Comics. Writer/Artist: Paul Chadwick.

Deadworld

Release: January by Arrow Comics. Writer/Editor: Stuart Kerr.

Eddy Current (12-issue limited series)

Release: July by Mad Dog Graphics. Writer/Artist: Ted McKeever.

Fusion

Release: January by Eclipse Comics. Writer: Steven Barnes. Artists: Lela Dowling and Steve Gallacci.

Good Girls

Release: April by Fantagraphics Books. Writer/Artist: Carol Lay.

Laugh (vol. 2)

Release: June by Archie Comics. Editor: Victor Gorelick.

Marksman

Release: January by Hero Comics. Writer: Steve Perrin Artist: Pete McDonnell

Ninja High School

Release: January by Antarctic Press. Writer/Artist: Ben Dunn.

Savage Henry

Release: January by Vortex Comics. Writer/Artist: Matt Howarth.

Tales of the Teenage Mutant Ninja Turtles

Release: May by Mirage Studios. Writers: Kevin Eastman and Peter Laird. Artists: Jim Lawson and Ryan Brown.

The Trouble with Girls

Release: August by Eternity Comics. Writers: Will Jacobs and Gerard Jones. Artists: Tim Hamilton and Dave Garcia.

Tutto West

Release: June by Sergio Bonelli editore; reprints of the classic Italian Western comics, written in the Fifties and the Sixties by Gian Luigi and Sergio Bonelli.

Uri-On

Release: by Israel Comics. Writer/Artist: Michael Netzer.

Usagi Yojimbo

Release: July by Fantagraphics. Writer/Artist: Stan Sakai.

Xenozoic Tales

Release: February by Kitchen Sink Press. Writer/Artist: Mark Schultz.

Zio Paperone

Release: December by Arnoldo Mondadori editore; Italian version of the Carl Barks Library.:

== Initial appearances by character name ==
=== DC Comics ===
- Christina Alexandrova in Flash #7 (December)
- Amazing Grace in Superman #3 (March)
- Axis Amerika in Young All-Stars #1 (June)
- Bibbo Bibbowski in Adventures of Superman #428 (May)
- Bloodsport in Superman #4 (April)
- Captain Atom in Captain Atom #1 (March)
- Danny Chase in New Teen Titans Annual #3 (1987)
- Clayface (Sondra Fuller) in Outsiders #21 (July)
- Artemis Crock in Infinity Inc. #34 (January)
- Carmine Falcone in Batman #404 (March)
- Eddie Fyers in Green Arrow: The Longbow Hunters #3 (October)
- General Wade Eiling in Captain Atom #1 (March)
- Sarah Essen Gordon in Batman #404 (March)
- James Gordon Jr. in Batman #407 (May)
- Arnold Flass in Batman #404 (March)
- Fury (Helena Kosmatos) in Secret Origins #12 (March)
- Gangbuster in Adventures of Superman #428 (May)
- Godiva in Infinity Inc. #34 (January)
- Cat Grant in Adventures of Superman #424 (January)
- Hades in Wonder Woman #1 (February)
- Hazard in Infinity Inc. #34 (January)
- Professor Hamilton in Adventures of Superman #424 (January)
- Icicle (Cameron Mahkent) in Infinity inc. #34 (January)
- Iron Munro in Young All-Stars #1 (June)
- Rhea Jones in Doom Patrol #3.
- Vanessa Kapatelis in Wonder Woman #3 (April)
- Gillian B. Loeb in Batman #404 (March)
- Maxwell Lord in Justice League #1 (May)
- Tina McGee in Flash #3 (August)
- Mime in Batman #412 (October)
- Neptune Perkins in Young All-Stars #1 (June)
- Overthrow in Blue Beetle #15 (August)
- Pozhar in Firestorm #64 (October)
- Prometheus in New Teen Titans #24 (October)
- Rampage in Superman #7 (July)
- Reaper in Detective Comics #575 (June)
- Red Trinity in Flash #6 (November)
- Holly Robinson in Batman #404 (February)
- Rocket Red in Justice League #3 (July)
- Rocket Red Brigade in Green Lantern Corps #208 (January)
- Maggie Sawyer in Superman #4 (April)
- Shado in Green Arrow: The Longbow Hunters #1 (August)
- Silver Banshee in Action Comics #595 (December)
- Silver Scarab in Infinity Inc. #42 (September)
- Speed Demon in The Flash #3 (August)
- Sprout in Swamp Thing #65 (October)
- Eric Strauss in Doctor Fate #1 (July)
- Linda Strauss in Doctor Fate #1 (July)
- Tsunami in Young All-Stars #1 (June)
- White Dragon in Suicide Squad #4 (August)
- Wild Dog in Wild Dog #1 (September)
- Zebra-Man in Outsiders #21 (July)

=== Marvel Comics ===
- Aries in West Coast Avengers #26 (November)
- Bird-Brain in New Mutants #55 (September)
- Blizzard (Donnie Gill) in Iron Man #223 (October)
- Bushwacker in Daredevil #248 (November)
- Combat Colin in Action Force #5 (Marvel UK)
- Comet Man in Comet Man #1 (February)
- Fallen Angels in Fallen Angels #1 (April)
- Ghost in Iron Man #219 (June)
- Goblyn in Alpha Flight #48 (July)
- Malice in Uncanny X-Men #214 (February)
- Manikin in Alpha Flight #44 (March)
- Mercy in The Incredible Hulk #338 (December)
- Microchip in The Punisher #4 (November)
- Philippus in Wonder Woman #1 (February)
- Rictor in X-Factor #17 (June)
- Mister Sinister in Uncanny X-Men #221 (September)
- Trick Shot in Solo Avengers #1 (December)

=== Independent titles ===
- Leatherhead
- Sam & Max in Sam & Max: Freelance Police Special Edition (Fishwrap Productions)
- Super Commando Dhruva in GENL #74 Pratishodh Ki Jwala created by Anupam Sinha, published by Raj comics
- Zenith in 2000 AD #536 (August 22, Fleetway)
