= List of Archie Comics imprint publications =

This is a list of Archie Comics imprint publications.

== Close-Up Inc. ==
1950–1952

- Darling Love #1–11 (1949–1952)
- Darling Romance #1–7 (1949–1951)
- Sam Hill, Private Eye #1–6 (1950–1952)

== Archie Adventure Series ==
1959–1966

- Adventures of the Fly #1–31 (August 1959 – October 1964; May 1965)
- Adventures of the Jaguar #1–15 (September 1961 – November 1963)
- Double Life of Private Strong #1–2 (June – August 1959)
- Jughead's Fantasy #1–3 (August – December 1960)
- Shadow #1–8 (August 1964 – September 1965)
- Tales Calculated to Drive You Bats #1–7 (November 1961 – November 1962), plus Giant #1 (1966)

1988–1995

- The Adventures of Bayou Billy #1–5 (September 1989 – June 1990)
- Mighty Mutanimals limited series #1–3 (May – July 1991)
- Mighty Mutanimals #1–9 (April 1992 – June 1993)
- Teenage Mutant Ninja Turtles Adventures #1–72 (August 1988 – October 1995)

== Radio Comics / Mighty Comics Group ==
1965–1967

- Fly-Man #32–39 (July 1965 – September 1966), previously The Adventures of the Fly
- Mighty Comics #40–50 (November 1966 – October 1967), numbering continued from Fly-Man
- Mighty Crusaders #1–7 (November 1965 – October 1966)
- Super Heroes vs. Super Villains #1 (July 1966), all reprints

== Red Circle Comics (original) ==
1973–1979

- Archie's Super Hero Special (January 1979)
- Archie's Super Hero Comic Digest Magazine #2 (1979)
- Chilling Adventures in Sorcery #3–5 (October 1973 – February 1974), continues to Red Circle Sorcery
- Mad House #95–97 (September 1974 – January 1975)
- Red Circle Sorcery #6–11 (April 1974 – February 1975); #6, 7, and 10 featured stories by T. Casey Brennan
- Super Cops #1 (July 1974)

1983–1984

- The Black Hood #1–3 (June – October 1983)
- Blue Ribbon Comics #1–14 (November 1983 – December 1984)
- The Comet #1–2 (October – December 1983), was to be a 6-issue mini-series
- The Fly #1–9 (May 1983 – October 1984)
- Katy Keene Special #1 (September 1983); continued under Archie Romance Series imprint
- Lancelot Strong: The Shield #1–7 (June 1983 – July 1984); with issue #3 (Dec. 1983), retitled Shield-Steel Sterling; with issue #4 (Jan. 1984), retitled Steel Sterling
- ManTech Robot Warriors #1–4 (September 1984 – April 1985)
- Mighty Crusaders #1–13 (March 1983 – September 1985)
- Original Shield #1–4 (April 1984 – October 1984)

== Archie Action ==
1993–present

- Knuckles Archives #1–4 (September 2011 - April 2013)
- Knuckles the Echidna #1–32 (August 1997 – February 2000), spin–off of Sonic the Hedgehog
- Mega Man #1–55 (April 2011 – December 2015), indefinite hiatus
- Sonic Archives #1–24 (November 2006 - February 2015)
- Sonic Boom #1–11 (October 2014 – September 2015)
- Sonic the Hedgehog #1–290 (July 1993 – December 2016)
- Sonic Select #1-10 (May 2008 – January 2015)
- Sonic Universe #1–94 (February 2009 – January 2017)
- Sonic X #1–40 (September 2005 – January 2009)

== Stan Lee Comics ==
2012

- Stan Lee's Mighty 7 #1–3 (March 2012 – September 2012)

== Red Circle Comics (revival) ==
2012–2014 All issues were released digitally. Print copies were released after the story arc had ended.

- The Fox #1–5 (October 2013 – March 2014), limited series, character later reappeared under the Dark Circle Comics imprint.
- New Crusaders #1–6 (September 2012 – March 2013)
- New Crusaders: Legacy #1 (July 2013)

== Archie Horror ==
2013–present

- Afterlife with Archie #1– (October 2013 – present)
- Chilling Adventures of Sabrina #1– (October 2014 – present)
- Jughead: The Hunger #1–13 (October 2017 – March 2019)
- Vampironica #1–5 (March 2018 – December 2018)
- Blossoms 666 #1–5 (January 2019 – July 2019)
- Jughead: The Hunger vs. Vampironica #1–5 (April 2019 – October 2019)
- Vampironica: New Blood #1–4 (December 2019 – June 2020)
- Archie Comics: Judgment Day #1–3 (May 2024 – July 2024)
- The Cursed Library #1–3 (August 2024 – December 2024)

== Dark Circle Comics ==
2015–2018

- The Black Hood #1–11 (February 2015 — June 2016)
- The Black Hood: Season 2 #1–5 (October 2016 – June 2017), a continuation of The Black Hood.
- The Fox #1–5 (April 2015 — August 2015)
- New Crusaders: Dark Tomorrow Special #1 (June 2015), one-shot featuring the Red Circle Comics versions of the characters.
- Sam Hill: In The Crosshairs (October 2015), a graphic novel released digitally featuring former NYPD detective Sam Hill.
- The Shield #1–4 (October 2015 – November 2016)
- The Hangman #1–4 (November 2015 – October 2016)
- The Mighty Crusaders #1–4 (December 2017 – March 2018)
