= Wilbur Comics =

American comic book (1944–1965)

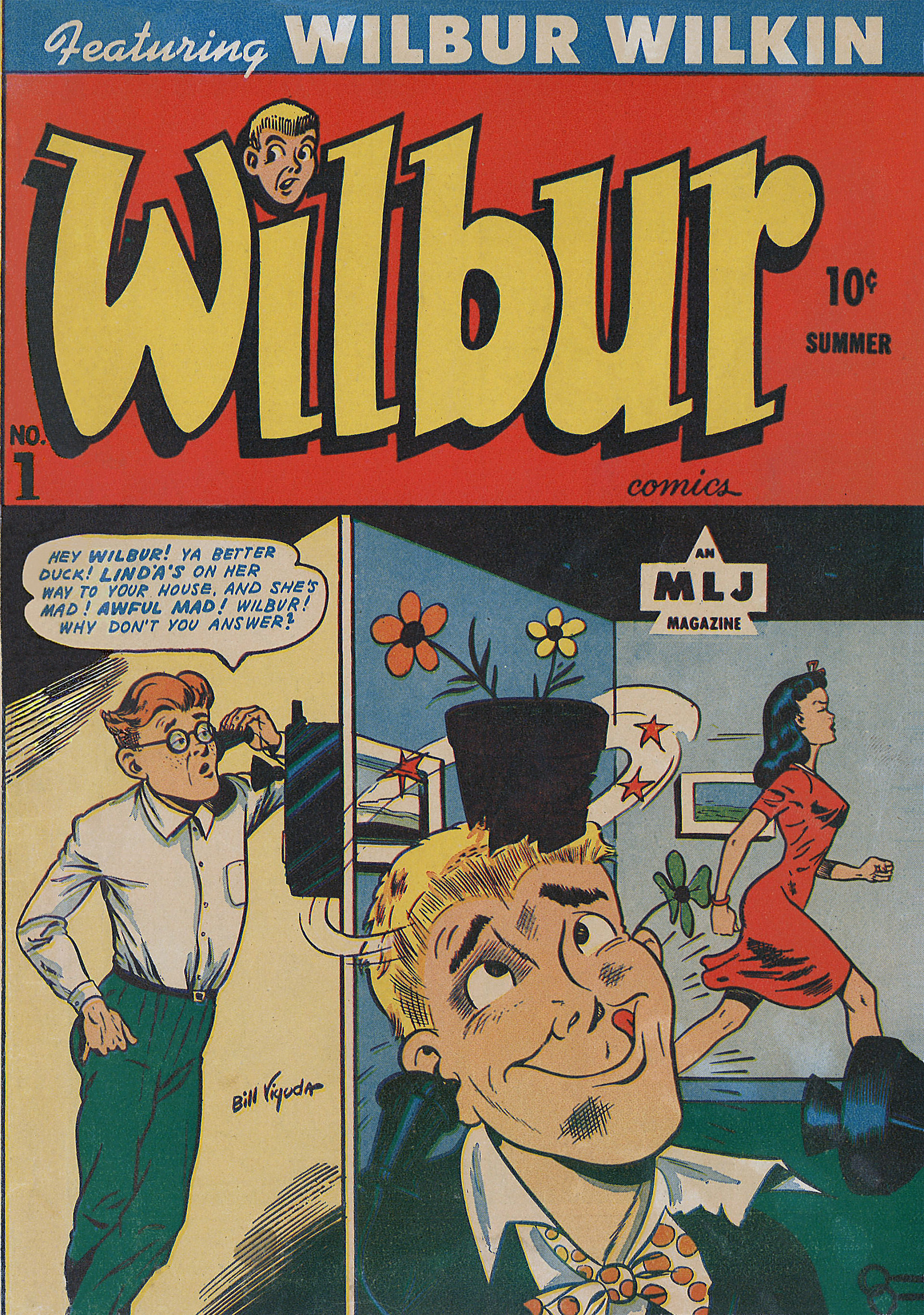
- Cover of Wilbur Comics 1 (July 1944), art by Bill Vigoda

Publication information
- Publisher: Archie Comics
- Publication date: 1944–1965
- No. of issues: 90

Creative team
- Artist: Dan DeCarlo

Wilbur Comics is a comic book published from 1944 to 1965. The comic featured the fictional character Wilbur Wilkin, a contemporary of Archie.

Wilbur Wilkin actually made his first appearance in Zip Comics #18 (September 1941), three months before Archie's first appearance. Wilbur also made appearances in several other Archie comics, such as Pep Comics, as a backup feature. Of particular note, popular Archie character Katy Keene made her first appearance in Wilbur Comics #5. This title was published originally under the imprint of MLJ Magazines, which then became Archie comics starting with issue #8. After issue #87 (December 1959), the book went on hiatus until August 1963's #88. After 1 more issue in 1964 and 1 in 1965, the series was canceled with issue #90.

In the late 1960s, Archie Comics reused the last name "Wilkin" in a new title, That Wilkin Boy. It is unknown if this was an attempt at relaunching Wilbur Comics (the new character Bingo Wilkin does not closely resemble Wilbur Wilkin), or if the editors just believed that "Wilkin" is a good comedy name.

Archie Comics has reprinted stories from the series in its Archie Comics Digests (which mainly feature the character Archie Andrews and his various friends).

== See also ==
- List of Archie Comics Publications
