= Frank Doyle (writer) =

- Born: November 17, 1917 Brooklyn, New York, U.S.
- Died: April 3, 1996 (aged 78) New Port Richey, Florida, U.S.
- Area: Writer
- Notable works: Archie Comics
- Awards: Bill Finger Award

Frank Doyle (November 17, 1917 – April 3, 1996) was the head writer for Archie Comics for over thirty years. He wrote over 10,000 stories featuring the Archie characters. Artist Dan DeCarlo referred to Doyle as "the best".

== Career ==
Doyle, one of several Archie contributors who studied art at the Pratt Institute, was originally a penciller for Fiction House comics, working on such titles as Planet Stories. After he was let go from Fiction House, he decided that he was better suited to writing stories: "It was easier," he said. "My mind worked better that way." In 1951 he joined Archie Comics as a writer. Though he no longer drew stories himself, he continued to write in storyboard form, using a desk that used to belong to Fiction House artist Fran Hopper.

By the end of the '50s, Doyle was writing the majority of stories for such important Archie titles as Archie and Betty and Veronica; DeCarlo said that when he joined Archie Comics, most of the scripts he was given were written by Doyle. In the mid-'60s, he also began writing many of the stories for adventure-themed titles like Life With Archie; he wrote all the stories featuring the Archie characters' superhero alter-egos such as Pureheart the Powerful.

According to DeCarlo, Doyle did "all the writing" for the early issues of She's Josie. Though he did not write the issue where the title was retooled into Josie and the Pussycats, he returned to the title soon after, writing many of the Pussycats-era stories. Doyle wrote the first issue of the Archie title That Wilkin Boy, and wrote the debut stories for several Archie supporting characters, including the first appearance of Cheryl Blossom.

Starting in the late '80s, Doyle became less prolific, but continued to write Archie stories every month until his death. His last story, "Cry Me a River," appeared in Betty and Veronica #104 (October 1996) after his death, with art by DeCarlo. Archie editor Victor Gorelick called him "just a tremendous writer" who was "responsible for so many things that people don't know about," while Kurt Busiek said that Doyle was "one of the best writers comics ever had."

Doyle was the 2012 recipient of the Bill Finger Award for Excellence in Comic Book Writing.
