= Mantech =

Mantech may refer to:

- ManTech International, a U.S. Department of Defense contractor specializing in national security and technology issues
- Praying Mantech, an invectid machine from the Spider Riders series of novels
- Mantech, a 1984 Remco toyline
  - ManTech Robot Warriors, an Archie Comics publication based on the toyline
