= Heartbreak Hotel (comics) =

80's UK comic magazine

Heartbreak Hotel was a UK comic magazine published from 1987 to 1988 by Willyprods/Small Time Ink (a publisher company founded by Don Melia and Lionel Gracey-Whitman).

Heartbreak Hotel was a brash and influential magazine that brought together comic art and music and served as a launch pad for the subsequent success of many new young artists.

Alan Moore, Mark Buckingham, Grant Morrison, Dave McKean, Bryan Talbot and Glenn Fabry were some of the artists that collaborated with the magazine.

== See also ==
- Strip AIDS
