= Katy Keene =

Comic book character

- Archie character
- Katy Keene Special #2 (1984); Art by John S. Lucas
- First appearance: Wilbur Comics #5 (summer 1945)
- Created by: Bill Woggon
- Portrayed by: Lucy Hale and Pacific Blain (young) (Katy Keene)

In-universe information
- Occupation: Model, actress, singer
- Relatives: Katherine Keene (mother)

Katy Keene is a character created by Bill Woggon that has appeared in several comic book series published by Archie Comics since 1945. She is a model/actress/singer marketed by the publisher as "America's Queen of Pin-Ups and Fashions". In the book From Girls to Grrrlz: A History of Women's Comics from Teens to Zines by Trina Robbins, Katy Keene is called a Bettie Page look-alike. "... but the resemblance ended there.

Readers were encouraged to submit original drawings of outfits and accessories for her and her friends to wear, as well as designs for automobiles, homes, interiors, rocket ships, trailers and boats. These designs were used in the comics with credit given to published submissions. Many issues featured paper dolls of Katy in various costumes.

== Publication history ==
Katy Keene was introduced in Wilbur Comics #5 in the summer of 1945, and appeared in subsequent issues of Wilbur and various anthology comic series in the 1940s including Archie, Jughead, Betty and Veronica and Ginger, eventually receiving her own title in 1949. Katy Keene Comics ran for sixty-two issues, briefly cover titled Adventures of Katy Keene (#50–53) and simply Katy Keene (#54–62), until July 1961. It was accompanied by fifteen issues of Katy Keene Pin Up Parade (1955–1961) and thirteen issues (#1–2, 13–23) of Katy Keene Fashion Book Magazine (1955–1959), along with annuals and specials such as Katy Keene Spectacular (1956), Katy Keene Glamour (1957), Katy Keene Charm (1958), and Archie Giant Series Magazine—cover titled Archie Giant Series Presents Katy Keene Holiday Fun—#7 (1960) and #12 (1961).

=== 1980s revival ===
In Winter 1979–1980 Katy fan Craig Leavitt began publishing—with Archie Comics' permission—a fanzine which was initially titled Katy, then became Katy – The Newsletter for issues #2–7, before finally becoming Katy Keene Magazine, and which ran for 19 issues until 1985. Having been a lifelong fan of the character, John S. Lucas's art was instrumental in the revival, as his work was featured in the magazine along with other artists' and fans' work. Several "Katy-Kons" (conventions) were held in Santa Barbara, California, and then later in conjunction with San Diego Comic-Con celebrating Woggon and Katy.

Archie Comics decided to revive the character themselves in 1983, giving the character her own title by using reprint art of Woggon's as well as new art by Don Sherwood, Vince Colletta, Hy Eisman and Dan DeCarlo. It ran as Katy Keen Special from September 1983 to October 1984 (#1–6), and then simply as Katy Keene from December 1984 to January 1990 (#7–33). The first issue was released under the Red Circle Comics imprint, after which the covers carried an "Archie Romance Series" imprint.

After seeing Lucas's art in the Katy Keene Fan Magazine and receiving letters from fans encouraging them to do so, Archie contacted Lucas, asking him to do the art for the revived Katy Keene Fan Club, which included pens, lapel buttons, membership cards, notepads, T-shirts, and sweatshirts. Not long afterward, Archie brought Lucas on as regular Katy artist. During the '80s, '90s and 2000s, Lucas carried on the Katy tradition with his comics, his annual Katy Keene Christmas Cards and Paper Dolls and paper doll books from Hobby House Press.

In the early 1990s, Katy once again went into retirement, except for a 1994 appearance in Archie Meets the Punisher.

=== 2005 reintroduction ===
Archie re-reintroduced Katy, now a high school student and aspiring model, in its 2005 Free Comic Book Day issue. She then appeared in Archie & Friends Comics #101–110, the stories from which were compiled in the trade paperback, Katy Keene: Model Behavior (2008).

=== New Riverdale ===
Katy Keene was reintroduced again in 2020 as part of the New Riverdale line of comics. She first appeared in Archie & Katy Keene, a four issue mini-series covering #710–713 within the Archie title. Keene, again a high school student, is an Instagram celebrity who moves to the city of Riverdale along with her teenaged younger sister, Sissy Keene.

Also in 2020, Keene was featured in Archie Comics 80th Anniversary Presents #8, which reprints stories from the original series.

== Supporting cast ==
Katy has a redheaded, bespectacled younger sister. In the original Woggon 1950s series, Katy's sister was a mischievous child around seven years old and known only as "Sis, the Candy Kid". In the 1980s, she was drawn as a tween or a young teen and received the name Melissa, but was still almost always called "Sis". In the short-lived 2000s series, her given name was Mackenzie. No explanation for the name change was given, although it may be due to the obscurity of the 1980s name. Regardless, her real name is almost never mentioned and to both readers and characters, she is always called "Sis". When Katy and her sister were re-introduced in 2020, her sister's name was revealed to actually be "Sis Keene", short for "Sissy Keene", instead of "Sis" just being a nickname like it previously was.

Originally, the 1950s Katy was 21 years old and Sis was about seven years old. In subsequent series, Katy is roughly the same age, but Sis was reimagined as being around 15 and has been so ever since. By this point, Katy had already been discovered in college. After going to work as an aspiring Broadway star, she became very successful in her modeling and acting career, so she became her sister's legal guardian.

Katy has had many recurring boyfriends over the years, the most famous of which are the redheaded and muscular boxer K.O. Kelly and his rich blond rival Randy Van Ronson. They were not often seen regularly in the 1980s when Katy dated the Latino airline pilot and talented dancer Ramon Ramirez and the Arnold Schwarzenegger parody Arnold Horsenlegger. However, K.O. and Randy became her main love interests again in the 2000s.

Katy's rival in her career and love life is a wealthy woman named Gloria Grandbilt and her best friend, Lucki Lorelei. The two are models, with Katy rounding out the trio.

== Reception ==
The character was ranked 57th in Comics Buyer's Guide's "100 Sexiest Women in Comics" list. In 2014, comparisons were made between pop star Katy Perry and Katy Keene, but Perry denied basing any of her image or costumes on the character and expressed surprise at the apparent similarities.

== Television adaptation ==
In August 2018, Roberto Aguirre-Sacasa, Chief Creative Officer of Archie Comics and creator of The CW television series Riverdale revealed that a spin-off of the series was in the works at the network. He said that the potential spin-off would be "very different from Riverdale" and that it would be produced "in [the 2018–19] development cycle." On January 23, 2019, The CW issued an official pilot order for the potential series, titled Katy Keene, that will reportedly follow "the lives and loves of four iconic Archie Comics characters — including fashion legend-to-be Katy Keene — as they chase their twenty-something dreams in New York City. This musical dramedy chronicles the origins and struggles of four aspiring artists trying to make it on Broadway, on the runway and in the recording studio."

The series itself lasted for 13 episodes, all aired in 2020. Several characters from the Katy Keene series (including Katy herself) made brief appearances on Riverdale shortly before the Katy Keene series debuted, and continued to appear on Riverdale even after Katy Keene's cancellation.
