= Archie at Riverdale High =

- Cover of Archie at Riverdale High 1 (Aug 1972)

Publication information
- Publisher: Archie Comics
- Schedule: bimonthly
- Publication date: August 1972-February 1987
- No. of issues: 113
- Main character: Archie gang

Archie at Riverdale High is a comic book title published by Archie Comics from August 1972 to February 1987, focusing on the Archie gang's day to day exploits at Riverdale High School.

Archie at Riverdale High differed from most Archie Series comic books in the following ways:

- The cover of the book displayed a teaser for one of the stories inside, complete with a "Don't miss..." description. For most Archie comics of the time, the cover had a gag bearing little connection to the inside material.
- At least one of the stories—usually the cover story—had a more serious tone than the usual fare; it either taught a moral lesson, or portrayed the gang being thrown into a dangerous (sometimes life-or-death) situation.
- At least one of the stories—including the aforementioned "serious" one—was often but not always ten pages long, rather than the usual five or six pages. Some of the issues had two ten-page stories, rather than the usual four five-page sequences.

The comic Life with Archie had a similar format.

== See also ==
- List of Archie Comics Publications
