= Comet Man =

Fictional comic book character

- The cover to Comet Man #3, art by Bill Sienkiewicz

Publication information
- Publisher: Marvel Comics
- First appearance: Comet Man #1 (February 1987)
- Created by: Bill Mumy, Miguel Ferrer and Kelley Jones

In-story information
- Alter ego: Doctor Stephen Beckley
- Species: Human (empowered)
- Place of origin: Earth-616
- Team affiliations: Fantastic Four
- Abilities: Superhuman strength and durability Teleportation; Force field generation Concussive blast projection Astral projection Flight via telekinesis Accelerated healing factor
Comet Man
Publication information
- Publisher: Marvel Comics
- Schedule: Monthly
- Format: Limited series
- Publication date: February – July 1987
- No. of issues: 6
Creative team
- Written by: Bill Mumy, Miguel Ferrer
- Artist: Kelley Jones

Comet Man (Stephen Beckley) is a fictional character appearing in American comic books published by Marvel Comics. The character first appeared in Comet Man #1, dated February 1987.

== Creation ==
The character was created partly due to wide public interest in the passing of Halley's Comet. It was the first comics work of Bill Mumy and his friend Miguel Ferrer. Mumy had achieved fame as a child actor, playing Will Robinson in the science fiction series Lost in Space. Ferrer was also an actor soon to have a major career breakthrough due to a prominent role in RoboCop. Mumy and Ferrer wanted to craft a character harking back to the Golden Age of Comic Books, and started off as a fictional comic title in a script in a proposed episode of The Twilight Zone.

After meeting Marvel editor-in-chief Jim Shooter at San Diego Comic-Con, they decided to try out the character as a comic; Comico also showed an interest in the project before a deal was signed with Marvel. Kelley Jones, recently of Marvel's licensed Micronauts title, was assigned as artist. He was pleased with the opportunity to draw a comic set in a quasi-realistic universe, as opposed to the science fiction stylings of the Microverse. Comet Man was planned to be part of the shared Marvel Universe, with the initial six-issue limited series featuring guest appearances from the Hulk, Captain America and the Fantastic Four.

== Publication history ==
The Comet Man limited series hit newsstands in October 1986. Shortly before, the creation was noted by Rolling Stone in their 'Where are They Now?' column. The series featured covers by Bill Sienkiewicz. Despite Mumy and Ferrer being interested in writing further adventures for the character, no further issues of the title appeared. Instead the character would make a guest appearance the following year in Fantastic Four #315–317, written by Steve Englehart. In 1990, the original team reunited for a brief four-issue run on the character in the anthology Marvel Comics Presents #50–53.

The character was then unseen for a decade until a surprise reappearance in Peter David's Captain Marvel in 2000, redesigned by artist ChrisCross, before once again vanishing into obscurity before a minor cameo in 2007's Civil War: Battle Damage Report #1.

== Fictional character biography ==
=== Early life ===
Jack Beckley chose to serve as a pilot with the United States Air Force in the South Pacific. Unknown to him, he left his fiancée carrying his child; to avoid a scandal, the girl's family moved her to Florida and had her son, John, put up for adoption. When Jack returned, she kept John's birth a secret and the pair married, having son Stephen and daughter Rosemary. When John grew up and founded the intelligence organisation called the Bridge, he tracked his real parents down only for Jack to treat him coldly. In revenge John sabotaged their plane, killing both of them.

Stephen Beckley became an astronomer and astrophysicist, earning a doctorate. He married former astronaut Ann Beckley, and the couple had a son called Benny. Together they also ran the Edmund Project, which investigated astronomical incidents. On a mission, Stephen piloted a craft through a tail of Halley's Comet and appeared to be killed. Instead, he met an alien called Max, a being from Colony Fortisque. Max claimed his race is responsible for starting evolution on Earth and other planets in the Milky Way Galaxy, and reconstituted Beckley in a body with superhuman powers. He returned to Earth and told his friend David Hilbert, only to find out he represented the sinister Bridge. Stephen was captured and underwent various tests. He was able to escape after discovering the true extent of his powers and took on the identity of Comet Man, but when Stephen returned home he found his wife and son had been kidnapped by the Bridge. His rescue attempt was nearly derailed through a coincidental run-in with the Hulk and a Mandroid. This attracted attention from old acquaintance Reed Richards, who invited Comet Man to Four Freedoms Plaza and helped him hone his powers. However, when Comet Man tried to teleport to Ann he arrived in her coffin, his wife having been killed in an unsuccessful escape attempt. Through the Fantastic Four he was linked up with Nick Fury of S.H.I.E.L.D., who told him more of the Bridge and revealed they were being run by John, styling himself as the Superior. Comet Man was able to rescue his badly-injured son from the Bridge, giving Benny a duplicated version of his powers as a result. Through Hilbert, he discovered that the Superior's plan was to capture Max but the Bridge's agents turn out to be no match for the alien, who also teleports himself and Comet Man away from his ship before John can trigger a nuclear device. Angered, the powerful alien briefly considered destroying Earth in revenge, but Comet Man was able to persuade him not to, and accompanied Max to the Colony Fortisque.

The pair met the Fantastic Four again while Comet Man was training on Arcturus IV, helping them defeat the alien Nuwali. Comet Man returned to Earth after the Fortisque society grew wary of his human values affecting them. On returning he found out that his sister Rosemary was looking after the comatose Benny. However, he did not realise that Rosemary's husband John Gallagher was the Superior. He was able to communicate with Benny, who was able to point out John's true identity to Comet Man. Benny then used his powers to make John kill himself.

Sometime later Comet Man returned to space with Max, but would once again visited Earth when Benny began using his powers, drawing the attention of the superhero Captain Marvel (Genis-Vell). After a confrontation, Captain Marvel agreed to let Comet Man take his son into space to learn more control over his powers.

Later, Stephen tried to help some S.H.I.E.L.D. agents trying to take down the Superhuman Registration Act violator Cybermancer during the Civil War, but was defeated. Stephen was considered a "potential recruit" for the Initiative program.

== Powers and abilities ==
Comet Man can teleport himself over vast distances, from Earth to any location in outer space. The limits on his teleportation range are as yet unknown. The ability is triggered subconsciously when he is in danger; he can utilize his teleportation power consciously through the use of a "psiamplifier" device, given to him by Reed Richards. Comet Man can teleport himself into the presence of another person by concentrating on that person, and subconsciously psionically scans the area to which he teleports himself to make sure he does not materialize within a solid object. He can also psionically project a portion of his own consciousness into the mind of another being; Comet Man refers to this power as "thought pitching." As a side effect of receiving psionic abilities, his capacity for feeling emotions himself has increased. Comet Man possesses superhuman strength, and durability, a regenerative healing factor and telekinesis which he uses to fly, create protective fields, and project destructive blasts.

== Reception ==
Adam Dennis of Comic Book Resources suggested the character could make an interesting addition to the Marvel Cinematic Universe. Following Ferrer's death, Dan Wickline commented positively on the series on Bleeding Cool.

== Notes ==
- Comet Man at the Grand Comics Database
