= Challenge of the Gods =

1987–1988 comic book story arc

- Cover to trade paperback of Challenge of the Gods. Art by George Pérez.
- Publisher: DC Comics
- Publication date: September 1987 – March 1988
- Genre: Superhero; Mythology
- Title(s): Wonder Woman vol. 2, #8-14
- Main character(s): Wonder Woman, Queen Hippolyta, Zeus, Cheetah, Hercules

Creative team
- Writer(s): George Pérez, Len Wein
- Artist: George Pérez

"Challenge of the Gods" was a seven issue comic book story arc written and drawn by George Pérez, with co-writing by Len Wein. It is the second arc of the Wonder Woman (Vol. 2) title that was, at the time, recently relaunched.

This arc picks where Gods and Mortals left off, treating this as a part two to the previous arc.

== Story ==
=== Time Passages ===
Narrated by Julia Kapatelis, Etta Candy, Vanessa Kapatelis, and Myndi Mayer; Diana had been hard at work promoting her message of peace, but was sad that some countries won't even listen to the words of a woman, and even Russia protested her uniform and her mythological aspects. Diana met the other heroes (as seen in Legends) but didn't join the new Justice League. The Pentagon, thanks to Diana, announced the Ares Assault was true and Diana talked to the widow to Colonel Michaelis where she learned loss of loved ones. Stores nationwide kept on getting sold out on merchandise of her with the profits going to the Wonder Woman Foundation. The end of every narration has the person saying that they will all miss her when she leaves to go back home.

=== Blood of the Cheetah ===
Barbara Minerva has arrived in Boston, and in her apartment; she and her man servant, Chuma, perform a ritual with Barbara naked on cheetah fur and Chuma making a cut on her wrist. Recently, a letter from Barbara came to Myndi and Julia, stating that she had a second Golden Girdle of Gaea. Diana and Myndi meet Barbara and before they can discuss the Girdle, Barbara asks if Diana brought her lasso. When Barbara touches it, and Diana asks for the Girdle, the lasso makes Barbara tell the truth that there is no second Girdle. Betrayed, Diana is aghast that a woman would be so treacherous to another and leaves in tears. Later, the last phase of the ritual occurs and with a drink of her now cursed blood, Barbara transforms into a were-animal: the Cheetah. As Diana stands alone, Cheetah appears and attacks her. The fight heads to the woods and Diana realizes the Cheetah is a human. Julia, armed with a rifle, shoots the Cheetah into the water. Diana searches for Cheetah with the intention of saving her, but with no luck. Seven days later, Diana is ready to leave. On Gay Head Cliffs, sobbing Julia and Vanessa say their goodbyes to Diana. Afterwards, Diana flies off out of sight.

=== Paradise Lost! ===
On Themyscira, the Amazons gather to discuss the gifts and records brought back from Man's World; the response is mixed. While she and her fellow Amazon and friend, Euboea are out horseback riding, Zeus calls for Diana from the skies overhead, and she goes to talk to him. Zeus tells her as a reward of defeating Ares, he will invite her to Mount Olympus to be among the gods in exchange of experiencing the ultimate sharing of flesh with him. When Diana tells Zeus that she won't surrender her virginity and pleads with him to understand her choice, Zeus gets angry at her defiance and unleashes his lightning on her. Hippolyta having heard Zeus' summons to Diana arrives on the scene and angrily demands Zeus release her daughter as her own virtue was taken by his son Hercules. Enraged, Zeus prepares to turn his wrath to Hippolyta and is about to fire a thunderbolt at her, but is forcibly returned to Mount Olympus by Hera, who acted on the request of her fellow goddesses who are furious at the King of the Gods for treating the Amazon colony as his personal harem. Later, Diana is summoned to Mount Olympus and a vengeful Zeus tells her that he has brought her to be judged; Diana must enter the gateway to the Demon lair beneath Themyscira to face several challenges. Diana clothes herself in armor and weapons inside the cavern. Suddenly, hands appear and grab Diana from every direction, revealing to be the last of the Hecatoncheires: Cottus. Pulled down, Diana uses her spear to kill the creature's heart. Regaining her feet, Diana comes face to face with a Seven Headed Hydra...

=== Fire and Torment ===
Protecting herself with her shield, the Hydra's engulfs Diana into a fireball, landing on volcanic ash to take out the fire. Diana then smashes one of the massive columns that supports the cavern's ceiling and it stucks the Hydra and Diana finally kills it. Worried, Hippolyta clothes herself in armor to help her daughter, and defeats General Philippus who stops her. Diana finds two patrols she must choose only to be attacked by Echidna, a She-Serpent. Diana frees herself before she is injected by venom and slams the serpent on a rock face. Diana heads towards a light and then sees a jet plane believed to be Steve Trevor’s, and then falls into the ocean and then appears on land with the crashed jet, learning it is not the same plane Steve used. Hearing a woman's voice, she looks up to see a woman wearing armor similar to hers speaking English. She says her name is Diana....

=== Echoes of the Past ===
In Oklahoma, Steve watches his late father rest in peace while Diana is talking to the spirit of Diana Trevor and learns she was named her and is Steve Trevor's mother. Diana Trevor explains that forty years ago, her plane was damaged during a lightning storm and she crashed on Themyscira. Hearing women's voices and savage fighting, she found herself at the cavern where the Amazons were fighting against the demons who were trying to get out. Helping, Diana faced the demons herself and she died in the process. Hippolyta gave her a warrior's grave, and her patriot markings would become the warrior's grab that Diana would later wear. Diana has learned that her heritage is being the living embodiment of all hope of two different worlds. The God Hades then appears to take Diana Trevor's soul, telling her she will be reunited with her husband. Back at the cavern, Diana is told by the god, Pan, that her next challenge relates to the Manhunter invasion (as chronicled in the concurrently-published "Millennium" crossover event) and she heads off. Elsewhere, Hippolyta faces similar challenges Diana had faced. Then, she finds herself seeing a man made of stone holding the cavern from below: Hercules!

=== Demon Plague ===
Hippolyta wonders, even though she hates him, what Hercules must have done to become what he is. Zeus finds out that Pan is dead and was impersonated by an impostor, who made Zeus act the way he did toward Diana, and Diana was sent somewhere else. Hermes finds Diana with other heroes, telling her about Pan, before returning her back into the cavern. A Cyclops grabs Hippolyta, to be his dinner, only to be stopped by Diana. After saving her, the Cyclops attacks again only to be tied by Diana's lasso and then begs to be killed. They then head back to where Hercules is and Hippolyta tells Diana that she doesn't want him to suffer like he is, despite what he did to her, and asks Diana to help her free him. But then a Minotaur, a Chimera and an Echidna appear and attack them, but the Cyclops appears again to defend the women. With them gone, including the Cyclops, Harmonia, daughter of Ares, gives Diana the talisman from the previous arc as Diana and Hippolyta frees Hercules and every demon tries to escape. Diana then captures them with the Talisman, with Ares taking it as his new pets.

=== For the Glory of Gaea ===
Diana returns to find Heracles holding Themyscira on his shoulders with an unconscious Hippolyta below. Hercules tells Diana to leave with Hippolyta, but when she says her place is with her mother, Hercules realizes Diana is Hippolyta's daughter. Just then, Zeus appears with the gods and goddesses behind him, telling Hercules that he has awoken from his ignorance and to all of them that the ordeal is over as are Diana's challenges. Diana takes Hercules and her mother to the surface where the Amazons are shocked to see Hercules again. Hercules comes forth and addresses the Amazons; he tells them how much he betrayed their trust and did this under the idea that it made him a man, but now that he has changed, he begs for their forgiveness. Proven to them, the Amazons approve and they all forgive him. In Oklahoma, Etta reveals to Steve that she loves him, only to be shocked when Steve says the same thing and they embrace. After the Amazonian festivities, Hercules kisses Hippolyta before he departs. The Amazons discuss Man’s World; even though they are cautious, they see the outside world hopeful now than they thought before. They want to learn more and Hippolyta tells Diana to return as their Ambassador. Back in Man's World, Vanessa and Julia see Diana has come back and they run up and hug her. Julia say Welcome home, Diana. Welcome home!

== Continuity ==
- In another difference from the pre-Crisis incarnation of the character, Diana's wardrobe was expanded beyond her standard costume. In this arc, Diana wore a battle armor version that included a spear, shield, and other weapons.
- This arc included the first appearance of the post-Crisis version of the Cheetah. Whereas the pre-Crisis version was a woman in a cheetah-like costume, this version is a mystically empowered werecat.
- References are made toward two major events at the time of its publication: Legends and Millennium. Legends occurs prior to the events of issue #8, which recaps the events of the crossover, including Diana's first meeting the other DC superheroes, while Millennium was published at the same time as this story was happening. Issues #12 and #13 crossed over with the event; partway into the story, it is revealed that Pan, the character responsible for stoking Zeus's amorous intentions towards the Amazons and setting the storyline in motion, is actually a Manhunter android in disguise. Issue #13 concludes with Hermes instructing Diana to find and destroy this imposter, and this storyline is resolved outside of the Wonder Woman series, in Millennium issue #7; Wonder Woman #14 begins with Diana returning from that battle.
