= Laugh Comics =

Comic book

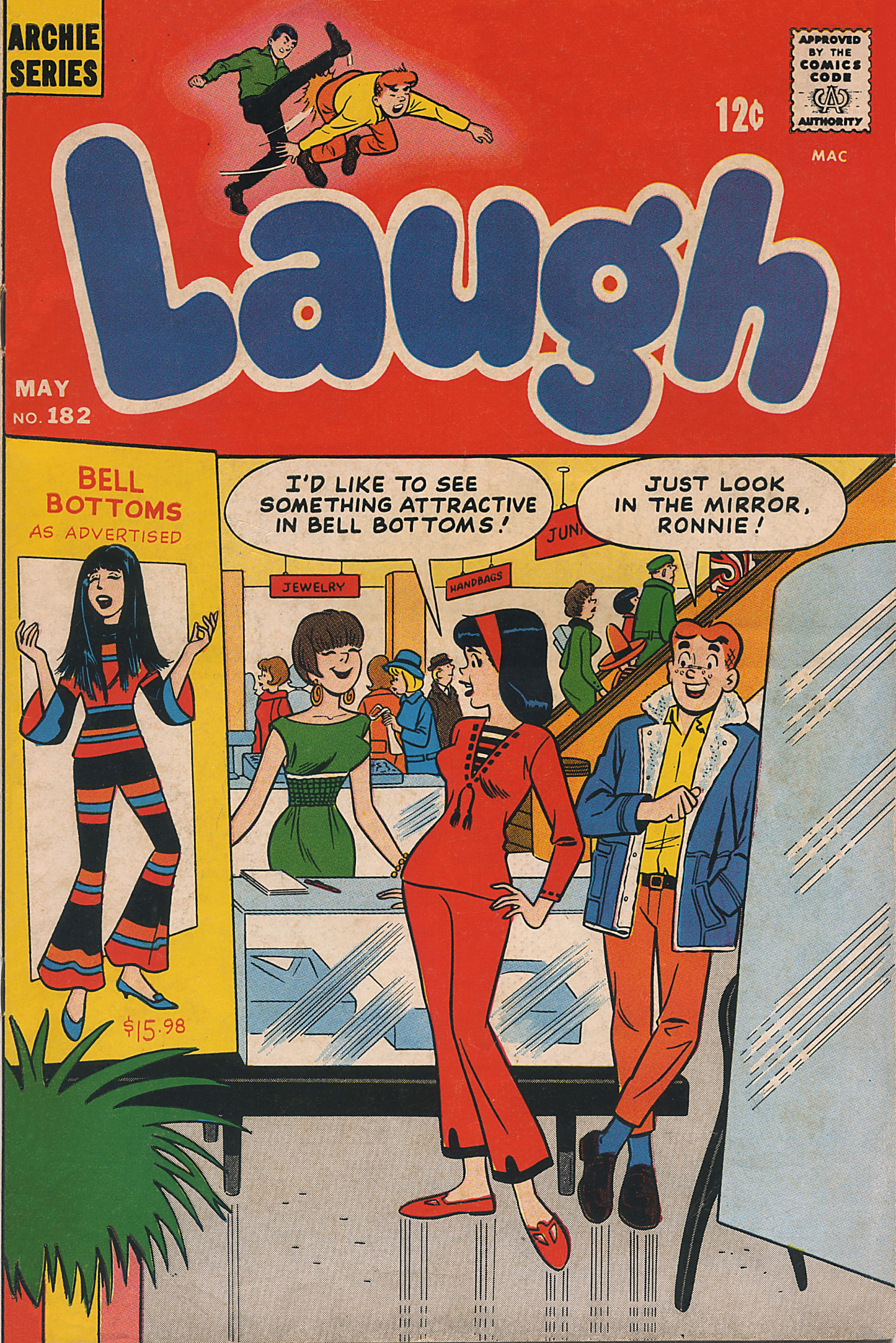
- Cover of Laugh Comics 182 (May 1966)

Publication information
- Publisher: Archie Comics
- Schedule: bimonthly
- Publication date: 1946-April 1987 (vol. 1); June 1987–Aug. 1991 (vol. 2)
- No. of issues: 400 (vol 1); 29 (vol. 2)
- Main character(s): Archie gang Josie and the Pussycats

Laugh Comics is a comic book produced by Archie Comics in two volumes, from 1946 to 1987 and 1987 to 1991. The title showcased some of the early appearances of the "Archie gang." Beginning with issue #145, Josie began making semi-regular appearances (some of her earliest), with art by Dan DeCarlo.

== Publication history ==
The title began with issue #20, continuing the numbering of Black Hood Comics. Laugh Comics vol. 1 concluded with issue #400 in 1987.

A second volume, titled simply Laugh, appeared a few months later, lasting 29 issues until August 1991.

== See also ==
- Laugh Comics Digest
