= Recalled Wreck =

- Story code: AR 105
- Story: Don Rosa
- Hero: Donald Duck
- Pages: 10
- Layout: 4 rows per page
- Appearances: Donald Duck; Huey, Dewey and Louie neighbor Jones

"Recalled Wreck" is a Donald Duck story by Don Rosa, first published in Walt Disney's Comics and Stories #524 in October 1987.

== Plot ==
Huey, Dewey and Louie are playing in the yard when Donald walks out with a can and tool box in his hands. He explains that he is going to restore his car. When he is finished, and has placed the car parts aside for when he is gone fixing the last piece of the car at Gyro Gearloose, Donald's neighbor, Jones, walks over to the parts, with a box full of junk and a sign that says "YARD SALE". When Donald comes back from Gyro's workshop, he notices his car parts are gone. He then goes on a quest to find his lost car parts...
