= Laugh Comics Digest =

Archie Comics publication

- Laugh Comics Digest #40 (1982)

Publication information
- Publisher: Archie Comics
- Schedule: bimonthly
- Publication date: August 1974-April 2005
- No. of issues: 200

Laugh Comics Digest is a publication of Archie Comics that lasted for 200 issues from August 1974 through April 2005. The title was noteworthy because it was not restricted to any character—it often included reprints of stories featuring the popular spinoff character Sabrina, the Teenage Witch, as well as That Wilkin Boy and Super Duck, and sometimes even included reprints from the very obscure title Cosmo the Merry Martian.

The title was first published as Laugh Comics Digest, then the name was later changed to Laugh Comics Digest Magazine, and finally it was changed to Laugh Digest Magazine.

In 2005, the title was cancelled and replaced with a new title, Tales From Riverdale Digest.
