= Archie and Me =

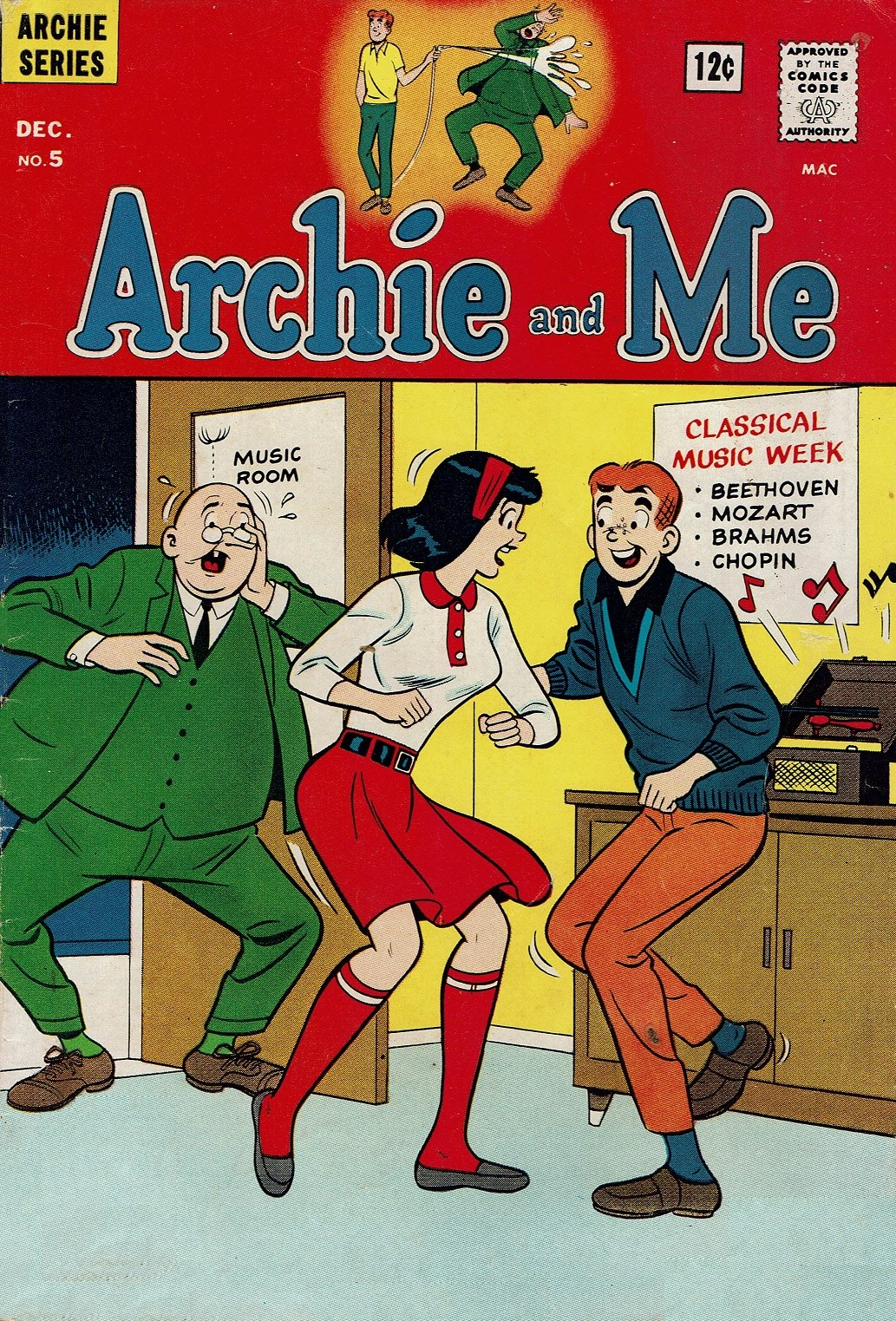
- Cover of Archie and Me 5 (December 1965)

Publication information
- Publisher: Archie Comics
- Schedule: bimonthly
- Publication date: October 1964-February 1987
- No. of issues: 161
- Main character(s): Archie Andrews; Mr. Weatherbee

Creative team
- Artist: Joe Edwards

Archie and Me is a comic book title published by Archie comics from 1964 to 1987. Most issues and covers focused on the interaction of Archie Andrews and the school principal, Mr. Weatherbee. This suggests that Mr. Weatherbee is the "Me" mentioned in the title, whereas the "Me" in Reggie and Me and Betty and Me appeared to refer to Archie Andrews himself.

== See also ==
- List of Archie Comics Publications
