= Archie's Mad House =

American comic book magazine

Archie's Mad House (sometimes rendered as Archie's Madhouse) is a comic book magazine published by Archie Comics from 1959 to 1982. The series went through a number of overhauls and name changes. Classic stories have occasionally appeared in digest magazines.

== History ==
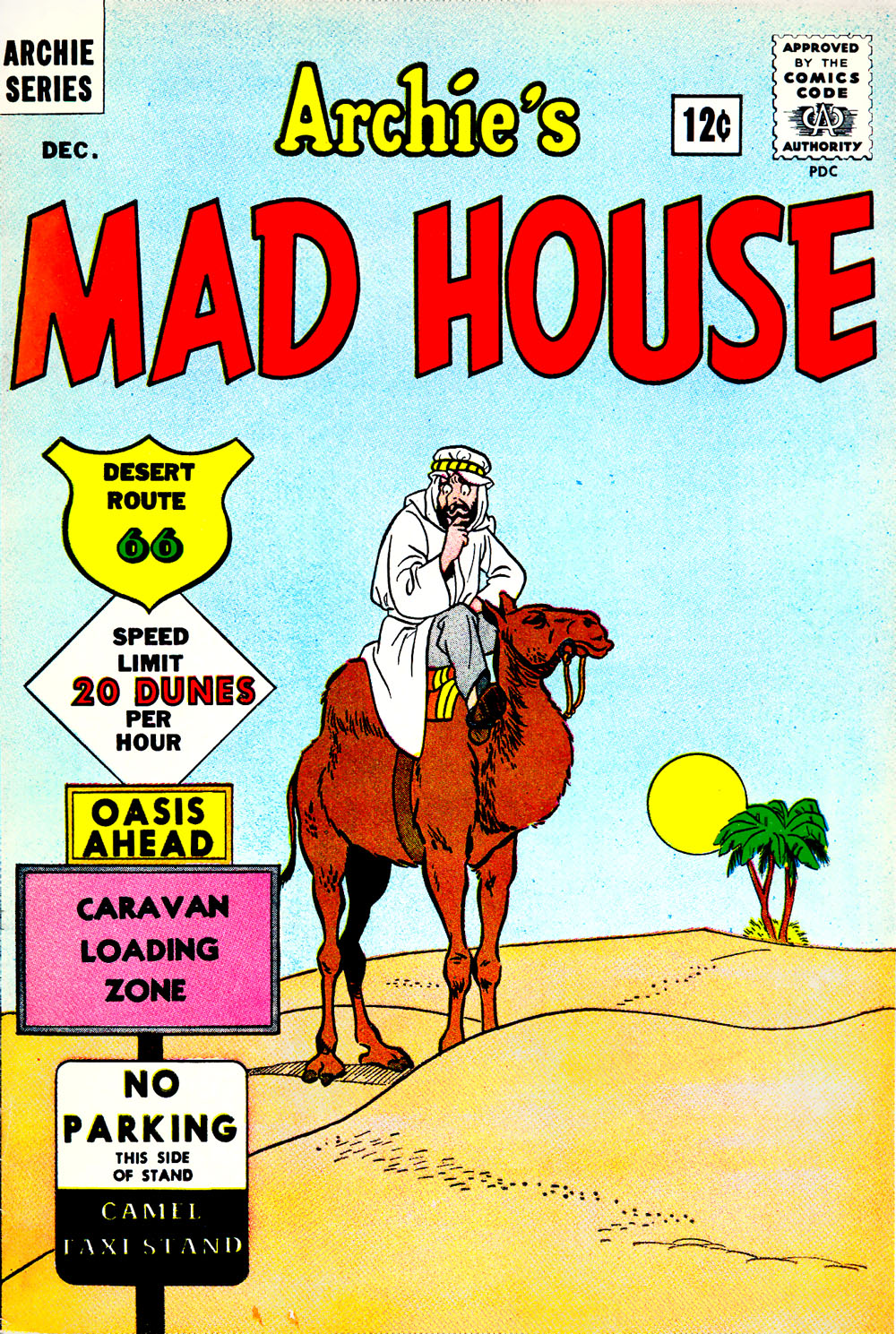
Cover of Archie's Madhouse #30 (December 1963)

The first 18 issues featured the "Archie gang" in stories that were a bit more "off the wall" than the normal Archie series. The idea was to produce stories that made no sense. The title Mad House was written as two words instead of one to suggest a false connection to MAD Magazine and recapture its success. Beginning with issue 19, the Archie gang was dropped (though it was still called Archie's Mad House), and the title began featuring monsters, space stories and other wacky short stories. The gags in the comics often parodied the latest fads and popular culture. For a time, it would focus on stories with what were intended to be one-off characters. There were, however, exceptions to this rule. Characters becoming popular enough would appear again.

Perhaps the most noteworthy installment was issue 22 when Sabrina the Teenage Witch was introduced, with art by Archie mainstay Dan DeCarlo. This issue has become one of the most sought after Archie issues of the Silver Age. Sabrina began making intermittent appearances through issue 74, and then transitioned over to other titles, such as Archie's TV Laugh-Out and her own Sabrina title. Other recurring characters included a bungling but victorious superhero named Captain Sprocket and a hippie named Clyde Didit (occasionally spelled Diddit) who served as a mascot for a while.

Shortly before Sabrina's departure, the title began a series of name changes, morphing into Madhouse Ma-ad Jokes, Madhouse Ma-ad Freakout, and Madhouse Glads. Issues #95-97 were published under the Red Circle Comics Group logo and published horror. It was renamed Madhouse Comics for issue #98-130 and returned to humor. The Madhouse Glads run introduced yet another "gang" into the Archie universe, but much like the "gang" introduced in That Wilkin Boy several years earlier, the "Madhouse Glads" gang never caught on with fans like the Josie gang did. Madhouse then returned to the series' irregular, nonsensical style before finally being discontinued.

== The Madhouse Glads ==
In the late 1960s, the comic went through a major overhaul due to the impact of hippies, mods and rock and roll on popular culture. Clyde Didit, originally a mascot, and occasionally in featuring within the comics, originally had unkempt brown hair and sunglasses, though he also appeared in Josie for a few issues with an orange Afro. The series was renamed Mad House Ma-ad starting with issue #66. At this point, Clyde and his friends took over the series, and it became more the typical style of that Archie used in the early 1970s. Thus, many stories focused more on adventure than humor, with a somewhat more serious tone.

Clyde was given a more clean-cut appearance and black hair. He and his gang continued into Mad House Glads (which started with Issue #73). At this time, Clyde and three his brothers Dippy Didit (orange hair), Dick Didit (brown hair) and Dan Didit (blonde hair) had a teenaged band called the Madhouse Glads (originally called the Madhouse Ma-ads), which somewhat resembled The Monkees. Clyde played the drums, while the other three each played a guitar. Other characters included the brothers' frustrated father Mr. Didit; a narcissistic, fashion-obsessed mod known as Rod "the Mod" Roman; Bippy the Hippie, a weird, freaked-out hippie; the band's crazed groupie, Fran the Fan, who dated both Clyde and Rod; and Fran's blonde friend Annette. As the series progressed, Dippy and Dan were relegated to supporting roles, while Fran and Rod grew in prominence. Dick, however, being Clyde's best friend, remained as involved in the storylines as ever until the gang was dropped from the series.

== Publication history ==
- Archie's Madhouse (66 issues, 1959–69)
- Mad House Ma-ad Jokes (4 issues, 1969)
- Madhouse Ma-ad Freakout (2 issues, 1969–70)
- Madhouse Glads (22 issues, 1970–74)
- Madhouse (36 issues, 1974–82)
- Archie's Madhouse Annual (6 issues, 1962–69)
- Madhouse Ma-ad Annual (1 issues, 1969)
- Mad House Annual (5 issues, 1970–74)
- Madhouse Comics Digest (8 issues, 1975–82)
