= Archie's TV Laugh-Out =

- Cover of Archie's TV Laugh-Out 1 (Dec 1969)

Publication information
- Publisher: Archie Comics
- Schedule: bimonthly
- Publication date: December 1969-February 1986
- No. of issues: 106
- Main character(s): Sabrina the Teenage Witch; Josie and the Pussycats

Archie's TV Laugh-Out is a comic book published by Archie Comics from 1969 to 1986. Sabrina the Teenage Witch appears in all 106 issues, and this title served as a transition for her from Archie's Mad House to her own title. The first issue introduced Sabrina's boyfriend, Harvey Kinkle.

In addition to Sabrina, the title featured regular appearances by the "Archie gang" and Josie and the Pussycats. The title was intended to showcase characters from Archie Comics's animated TV shows, which included The Archie Show (and its successors), Josie and the Pussycats and Sabrina the Teenage Witch.

== See also ==
- List of Archie Comics Publications
