= Don Melia =

British cartoonist

- Born: 25 December 1953; Liverpool, England, UK
- Died: 21 August 1992 (aged 38); Liverpool, England, UK
- Notable work: Matt Black: Charcoal, Heartbreak Hotel (comics), Strip AIDS, Buddies

Don Melia (25 December 1953 – 21 August 1992) was a gay British cartoonist, editor, activist, and philanthropist. Born in Liverpool, he was known largely for his involvement in Matt Black: Charcoal, Strip AIDS, Heartbreak Hotel, and Buddies, comic series that helped uplift the gay community, bring attention to and educate the public about the AIDS crisis, and helped create a gay community in the comics industry.

== Personal life and career ==
In his early life, before beginning his comics career, Don Melia worked in the film industry which was his start in media.

As a gay cartoonist and media personality, Don Melia always hoped that Britain could develop an LGBTQ+ comic community which was a large reason behind his activism. Through his work, he worked to create a gay comic community that would continue to expand far beyond himself and succeeded in doing so as his comic series brought attention to the careers of burgeoning cartoonists, including Dave McKean, and inspired the creation of many different LGBTQ+ comic series around the world, like Strip AIDS USA.

After creating Strip Aids, Don Melia was hired by Titan Books for the role of publicity director where he worked and continued to work towards bringing comics into the mainstream.

== Comics ==
=== Matt Black: Charcoal (1986–1987) ===
Don Melia is the illustrator behind Matt Black: Charcoal, a comic in which he and Lionel Gracey-Whitman, the creator and writer of the comic, created the first gay superhero in history, Matt Black.

=== Heartbreak Hotel (1987–1988) ===
Don Melia is a creator and cartoonist of Heartbreak Hotel, a comic series that was tied to music and had a large and varied number of cartoonist involved with the series. In the first issue of Heartbreak Hotel, Don Melia's comic "Heartbreak Hotel" appeared, named after the song "Heartbreak Hotel" by Elvis Presley.

Some of the notable cartoonists involved with the series are Dave McKean, Grant Morrison, Alan Moore and Bryan Talbot.

=== Strip AIDS (1987) ===
Don Melia was the creator and editor of Strip AIDS, a comic book which centered around AIDS in educating the public about the disease, dispelling the hysteria that surrounded it, and providing aid and comfort to the LGBTQ+ community in a time when they were faced with great hostility. The book was also meant as a fundraiser to support the London Lighthouse, an organization hoping to build a living community for those affected by AIDS, but it met with little success. However, the comic series attracted a very large audience and inspired the creation of Strip AIDS USA, a similar comic book that was edited by Trina Robbins, Bill Sienkiewicz, and Robert Triptow.

Some of the notable cartoonists involved with Strip AIDS include Melinda Gebbie, Dave Gibbons, Alan Moore, and Posy Simmonds.

=== Buddies (1991–1999) ===
Don Melia is editor of the first two editions of Buddies, a comics series that attempted to mimic the US series Gay Comix in order to create the gay comics community that he wished Britain had. The two editions edited by Melia focused primarily on comics depicting the experience of gay men in England.

== Death ==
Don Melia died of AIDS-related illnesses on 21 August 1992, in Liverpool, England.
