= Blossoms 666 =

5-issue comic book miniseries

- Cover of Blossoms 666 #1 (January 2019). Art by Laura Braga.

Publication information
- Publisher: Archie Horror
- Format: Limited series
- Genre: Horror
- Publication date: January – July 2019
- No. of issues: 5
- Main character(s): Cheryl & Jason Blossom

Creative team
- Created by: Cullen Bunn; Laura Braga
- Written by: Cullen Bunn
- Artist(s): Laura Braga
- Letterer(s): Jack Morelli
- Colorist(s): Matt Herms
- Editor(s): Victor Gorelick; Alex Segura; Jamie Lee Rotante; Stephen Oswald; Vincent Lovallo

Blossoms 666 is a 5-issue comic book miniseries published by Archie Horror, an imprint of Archie Comics, in 2019. The story, which takes place in an alternate reality from the main Archie Comics continuity, focuses on siblings Cheryl and Jason Blossom as they compete for the title of Anti-christ. The series was created by writer Cullen Bunn and artist Laura Braga.

== Publication history ==
In October 2018, Blossoms 666 was one of two 5-issue comic book miniseries announced by the Archie Horror imprint of Archie Comics, along with the crossover series Jughead: The Hunger vs. Vampironica. The limited series was written by Cullen Bunn and illustrated by Laura Braga. Bunn described the series as "one part Omen, one part Cruel Intentions, all Archie!"

The first issue was released on January 23, 2019, making Blossoms 666 the first limited series to be published by the Archie Horror imprint. The second issue was released on March 6, the third issue on April 17, and the fourth issue on May 29. The fifth and final issue was released on July 17.

== Story ==
The story revolves around twins Cheryl and Jason Blossom, who secretly come from a family of Satanists, as they compete for the title of Anti-christ. The Blossoms throw a pool party at their parents' mansion and invite all of their peers from Riverdale High School as part of their competition. Cheryl personally convinces Dilton Doiley to go to the party after rescuing him from Reggie Mantle's taunting, while Jason charms Miss Grundy into giving Jughead Jones an extension on a paper so that he can attend as well. At the party, the Blossom siblings play Truth or Dare with the other attendees and ask them to admit increasingly vicious truths and commit potentially homicidal dares, resulting in Betty Cooper storming off. As Jason's plan backfires and Jughead skips the party, Jason instead sets his sights on Ethel Muggs. Meanwhile, Cheryl takes Dilton into the woods where she is keeping Reggie tied to a tree. Cheryl then offers Dilton a knife and "dares" him.

The following Monday, a shadowy figure arrives in Riverdale. Dilton runs out of class after Miss Grundy notes Reggie's absence, prompting Betty to check on him. Dilton warns her to stay away and scatters at the sight of Cheryl. As Jason dismisses Cheryl's concern regarding Betty, they are met at Blossom Mansion by a sheriff who questions them about the disappearances of Reggie and Ethel. The Blossoms feign ignorance, but Cheryl suggests that the sheriff, who is revealed to be a Satanist, should talk to Dilton about Reggie. After her friends dismiss her suspicions of the Blossoms, Betty investigates the woods behind their mansion and finds a crazed Ethel, who points Betty to a cave containing a bloody Satanic idol. Admitting that Betty needs to be dealt with, Jason proposes that whoever can corrupt her "picture of innocence" shall be crowned the Anti-christ. Cheryl agrees to the terms, as does a man identifying himself as Julian Blossom, their older brother.

A flashback to the Blossom twins' birth reveals that they are actually triplets, and that the first-born Julian was taken away by cultists. In the present, Clifford and Penelope Blossom confirm that one of the three children will become the Anti-Christ. Betty misses school and witnesses Dilton being arrested by police. Feeling guilty that the group ignored Betty's concerns about the Blossoms, Archie Andrews convinces Betty's best friend Veronica Lodge to check on her. However, Cheryl insists to Veronica, also Betty's rival for Archie's affections, that Betty is manipulating the situation only to get Archie's attention. Meanwhile, Ethel tells Betty about her nightmares of the idol and, under Jason's secret orders, she sends Betty to research the Order of Abaddon. At the library, Betty finds a picture of her parents in one of the books on the Order before Julian introduces himself, offering to aid in her research so that they can take Cheryl and Jason down.

Flashbacks reveal Cheryl and Jason's more pleasant and privileged upbringing compared to Julian's. In the present, Betty finds another image of her parents in an Order of Abaddon book, this time with the Satanic idol from the cave behind the Blossom Mansion. Julian volunteers to help Betty find answers because, as he claims, Cheryl and Jason took everything from him. Meanwhile, after a freak accident nearly kills them, Cheryl and Jason agree to unite against Julian. As a result of Cheryl's previous intervening, Veronica visits Archie at home, distracting him from calling Betty. Jughead stumbles upon Ethel outside of Pop's diner and Ethel explains that she needs to show him something in the woods behind the Blossom estate. Betty invites Julian to her house to devise a plan and decides to warn her friends by sharing her findings about the Blossoms. However, Betty finds Archie and Veronica kissing and runs away upset. As Archie and Veronica embrace, he utters "All praise Abaddon."

Ethel leads Jughead to the three-tongued idol of Abaddon and orders him to kill her as a sacrifice. When he refuses, she stabs herself. Fleeing, Jughead runs into Cheryl and Jason, with the latter ready to collect on the favor Jughead owes him. After another freak accident results in Jason saving Cheryl's life, Cheryl suggests telling the truth in order to take Julian down. With Betty feeling hurt by Veronica and Archie, Julian blames Cheryl and Jason's manipulation. Betty and Julian hope to gain answers from Dilton, but find him hanged in his cell. Julian attempts to make Betty vengeful until Jughead arrives to tell Betty the truth, resulting in Betty slapping Julian and stomping off. Returning to the Blossom Mansion, Julian is stabbed to death by Cheryl and Jason to prevent him from ruling as Anti-Christ. The Blossoms then agree to resume their competition. While being watched in Pop's diner, Betty and Jughead wonder what to do now. Elsewhere, a body under a bloodied sheet rises.

== Characters ==
- Cheryl Blossom: A popular student at Riverdale High School and a member of the wealthy, and secretly Satanist, Blossom family. Between her and her brothers Jason and Julian, one of them is the Anti-christ, and the siblings compete with each other for the title.
- Jason Blossom: A popular student at Riverdale High School and a member of the wealthy, and secretly Satanist, Blossom family. Between him and his sister Cheryl and brother Julian, one of them is the Anti-christ, and the siblings compete with each other for the title.
- Julian Blossom: Cheryl and Jason's older triplet brother who was taken away at birth by cultists. Upon his return, he also competes for the title of Anti-christ. Resentful of his siblings' privileged upbringing compared to his own, he teams up with Betty to take them down.
- Betty Cooper: A student at Riverdale High School whose long-gestating suspicions of the Blossoms intensify following their pool party. She sets out to investigate them and, lacking support from her friends, teams up with Julian to find answers. Unbeknownst to her, corrupting Betty becomes the goal of the Blossoms' competition.
- Ethel Muggs: A student at Riverdale High School who turns up missing after the pool party. Found in a manic state in the woods by Betty, who tries to help her get answers, Ethel subsequently acts as Jason's secret pawn in his mission to corrupt Betty.
- Jughead Jones: A student at Riverdale High School who is personally invited to the pool party after Jason gets him an extension on a paper. He ultimately skips the party, but owing Jason a favor, he later falls victim to the Blossoms' manipulation.
- Veronica Lodge: A student at Riverdale High School and Betty's brazen best friend and romantic rival who convinces her go "cut loose" and attend the pool party. Cheryl later manipulates her into believing that Betty's actions are a plot to obtain Archie's affections.
- Archie Andrews: A student at Riverdale High School who attends the pool party. He seemingly comes to regret dismissing Betty's suspicions of the Blossoms, but after Betty catches him and Veronica kissing, which upsets her, he is revealed to be a follower of Abaddon.
- Dilton Doiley: A student at Riverdale High School who is personally invited to the pool party after Cheryl defends him from Reggie's taunting. At the party, Cheryl encourages him to torture a tied-up Reggie. He is later arrested in connection with his disappearance.
- Miss Grundy: A teacher at Riverdale High School. She gives Jughead an extension on a paper after being persuaded by Jason.
- Clifford and Penelope Blossom: The wealthy and secretly Satanist parents of triplets Julian, Cheryl, and Jason.
- Reggie Mantle: A student at Riverdale High School who picks on Dilton. He next appears tied to a tree during the pool party as Cheryl dares Dilton to torture him. Afterward, he is declared missing.

Kevin Keller and Moose Mason make brief appearances in the first issue as attendees of the Blossom pool party. In later issues, Alice and Hal Cooper also appear in photographs.

== Reception ==
Blossoms 666 received positive reviews from professional critics. The series holds an average critic rating of 8.1 out of 10 on the review aggregation website Comic Book Roundup, based on 32 reviews.

Patrick Cavanaugh of ComicBook.com gave the first issue a rating of 5 out of 5, praising the creative team and adding, "Blossoms 666 keeps up the tradition of Archie Horror by finding the perfect way to balance what readers already know about characters with terrifying horror movie tropes." Joey Edsall of Newsarama gave the debut issue a rating of 8 out of 10, calling it "a great issue in its own right" and said that Bunn, Braga, and colorist Matt Herms "excel at both imbuing the more gothic scenes and locale with a thick atmosphere of dread and at making the juxtaposition between the world of the Blossoms and the rest of Riverdale's youths pronounced without being overly jarring."

Cavanaugh gave the second issue a rating of 4 out of 5, writing, "Blossoms 666 continues to walk the line between a campy teen drama and a horrifying exploration of cults in a small town, with [Bunn and Braga] showing their skills with both tones. [...] The narrative didn't drive forward too much, the issue's only shortcoming, yet this just leaves us with more places to go, with this chapter remaining engaging and entertaining." Nathan Koffler of Comics: The Gathering rated the issue 10 out of 10, crediting Bunn's writing for producing "an amazing issue that is full of tension, drama, and wickedness with characters that are sexy, intimidating, and menacing." He also praised Braga for illustrating those elements "beautifully" and said that she did "an exceptional job at turning those [...] characters into visuals for us to fall in love with."

For the third issue, Cavanaugh reported a rating of 5 out of 5. He applauded the new narrative wrinkle in Julian Blossom for breaking with the book's darker themes and for "[putting] the story in a position to take some unexpected twists and turns, making an already intriguing story even more mysterious. The book continues to walk the fine line between being a straightforward horror story and a campy adventure, which is a highly entertaining delight for all fans of the darker side of Riverdale." Reviewing for Comic Watch, Nicholas Osborn praised the issue's pacing and artistry, giving it an overall rating of 9 out of 10. He concluded, "Blossoms 666 #3 deepens the mystery with compelling developments and an emphasis on character drama."

The fourth issue received a rating of 4 out of 5 from Cavanaugh, who noted that the issue largely serves to "[move] important pieces around the board to set up the story for some exciting reveals." He felt that, "Despite the slight stagnation of the narrative momentum, we're still delivered a creepy and charming story exploring the seedier side of Riverdale, making for an entertaining read for all fans of the darker interpretations of Archie Comics." Multiversity Comics' Michael Govan gave the issue a rating of 5.5 out of 10. He criticized the characterization of Julian and the inclusion of the Betty-Archie-Veronica love triangle, but praised the comparable appearances of the characters to the actors who play their live-action counterparts on the television series Riverdale.

Cavanaugh of ComicBook.com described the fifth and final issue as "ambiguous and underwhelming" but again praised the artwork, which he felt "[makes] the book work well tonally, even without a single bubble of dialogue." With a rating of 4 out of 5, he concluded, "The dialogue between the characters feels authentic and engaging, yet the events of the actual book feel as though the storyline ran out of steam and serves more as a collection of scenes than an organic ending." Beyond The Panel's Jideobi Odunze gave the issue an overall rating of 7.5 out of 10. He offered a mixed reaction to the artwork, criticizing the amount of off-panel action, but wrote, "The only thing that really sold those moments were the reaction shots and terrified expressions. To that extent they did succeed in creating engagement with the tone of the story."
