= That Wilkin Boy =

Comic book series

- Cover of That Wilkin Boy #1 (January 1969)

Publication information
- Publisher: Archie Comics
- Schedule: Quarterly
- Format: Ongoing series
- Publication date: January 1969 – October 1982
- No. of issues: 52
- Main character: Bingo Wilkin

Creative team
- Created by: Frank Doyle, Dan DeCarlo

That Wilkin Boy is a comic book series published by Archie Comics about a teenage boy, Bingo Wilkin, who lives in Midville, next door to his girlfriend, Samantha Smythe. That Wilkin Boy debuted with issue 1 dated January 1969 (so it was on sale in late 1968), and ran until issue 52 dated October 1982. The book, which spotlights Bingo's garage band the Bingoes, was released as Archie's more well-known title character had found real-world recording success with the release of The Archies' "Sugar, Sugar".

== Characters ==
=== Principal characters ===
Woodrow "Bingo" Wilkin III
The brown-haired rambunctious 17-year-old main protagonist who's a popular student at Midville High School. He's steady with his girlfriend Samantha (see below), which is a source of trouble for her father Sampson. Bingo also leads his pop rock group The Bingoes—he's the lead vocalist and plays lead guitar. He also plays sports for Midville High School. Bingo was eventually revealed to be the cousin of Forsythe "Jughead" Jones. This is ironic, as he is really more like Archie: clumsy, accident prone, and highly interested in dating. However, he remains faithful to only one girl, Samantha. The fact that their fathers never get along, and that Sampson is prejudiced against him for his clumsiness and perceived lack of traditional "male strength", is an obstacle in their relationship.
Samantha Smythe
A vivacious blonde-haired 17-year-old, Samantha is Bingo's steady girlfriend, much to the chagrin of her weightlifting, hyper-masculine father. She also fills-in with a tambourine and backing vocals with The Bingoes. Her family lives next door to the Wilkins. Influenced by her father, she has improved her strength to the point where she can overpower Bingo (a fact often humorously referenced in the comics). She resembles Betty Cooper in a number of ways. She discourages female stereotypes, as she has appeared in stories involving feminism and had a steady boyfriend, despite appearing somewhat tomboyish.
Uncle Herman
The uncle to both Bingo and Jughead Jones. He played professional baseball when he was younger, and can be seen talking about it and playing it in the back yard. His baseball nickname was "Rabbit". He also enjoys inventing and tinkering with machines. His last name had been given as Wilkin in the 1970s, making him the brother to Bingo's father. The relaunch of That Wilkin Boy in 2006 retconned Herman as the brother of Bingo's mother.
Sampson Smythe
Samantha's traditionally-masculine, muscular father who dislikes Bingo. He often picks fights with the neighbors, and tries to foil Bingo and his pals. In one story, he was nicknamed "Hurricane". He likes lifting weights, and thinks Bingo is weak and unmanly. One target for his derision is Bingo's father, Willie, whom he sometimes calls "Wee Willie", or "Weak Willie", among other derisive names. He regularly says the last name incorrectly as "Wilkins" to irritate Willie. When he is actually angry at Willie, however, he uses it correctly. Despite all this, his wife, Sheila, and Willie’s wife, Wilma, are best friends and are often called upon to referee their husbands when they are bickering.
"Tough" Teddy Tambourine
A slim, muscular, and macho 18-year-old young man who knows how to play "cool". He sports closely cropped black hair, thick eyebrows, sunglasses, and often flashy fashions. Teddy performs backing vocals and bass guitar (sometimes banjo or percussion) for The Bingoes. Something of a playboy, he often tries to win over Samantha, and sometimes has her father’s support in it, but he never succeeds. A character very much like Reggie Mantle, he is often a victim of Rebel’s schemes, especially when Teddy tries to discredit Bingo in some way.
Buddy Drumhead
A soft-spoken 17-year-old hippie chum of Bingo and Teddy's, who plays the drums in The Bingoes, and hits his drumsticks on everything around him. He wears a funny hat (usually a black one with a wide brim) and likes to ride his motorbike. More or less content with his lot in life, he prefers not to get involved with his friends’ relationship problems.
Rebel
A golden orange spotted beagle with the power of conscious thought. He often comes to Bingo's aid in a pinch, and has a mutual hate relationship with Teddy. Rebel is often the one who makes sure that Teddy does not interfere with Bingo and Samantha’s relationship. Teddy is the only one who knows that Rebel is sentient, and Rebel mocks him by performing unusual (for a dog) acts solely in his presence.

=== Supporting characters ===
Willie Wilkin
Bingo's father, a short, stout, bespectacled businessman. His full first name in one story is given as William, rather than Woodrow, so it is not known after whom Bingo is named. He is very choleric, throwing a fit every time he gets upset, and is especially sensitive about Sampson constantly and deliberately mispronouncing his surname as "Wilkins", even when out of immediate hearing range. The only thing the two can mutually agree on is their intense dislike for The Bingoes, especially when they are invited to their homes for practice.
Wilma Wilkin
Bingo’s mother, and the sister of Uncle Herman and Gladys Jones. She and Sheila are best friends. Their husbands are constantly fighting, leaving it up to them to break it up.
Sheila Smythe
Sampson’s down-to-earth homemaker wife. She is more understanding than her husband. She and Wilma are pleased that Bingo and Samantha date. Sheila is often seen trying to make her husband see things the other way.

=== Occasional characters ===
Jughead Jones
A main character from the Archie comic series who is Bingo’s cousin. He appears when the stories cross over.
Mr. Sanders
An African-American teacher at Midville High School who is very warm-hearted and supportive toward Bingo.
Zelda Maxson
A girl who moved to Midville with her widowed mother. Samantha saw her as competition for Bingo (though Zelda once developed a crush on Buddy).
Mr. Parker
The phys-ed teacher and sports director at Midville High School.

== The reintroduction of Bingo Wilkin in Archie Comics ==
Previously published stories from That Wilkin Boy are frequently featured in digest magazines, most notably as a regular feature in Jughead & Friends Digest. To promote the reprints, Archie Comics featured an official "reintroduction" of That Wilkin Boy in Jughead & Friends Digest #5.

The linkup of Bingo and Uncle Herman to Jughead is illustrated in the lead story "Cry Uncle" in issue 5 (2006) of Jughead & Friends Digest. In it, Jughead visits his Uncle Herman in Midville; as it turns out, Uncle Herman is related to both Bingo and Jughead. Both of their mothers are his younger sisters. Teddy and Buddy briefly appear and make remarks about Jughead's famous gray crown beanie. Bingo and Samantha tried to bake a cake for their school's cooking class, and hilarity ensues as usual.
