= Betty and Veronica =

Characters in the Archie Comics universe

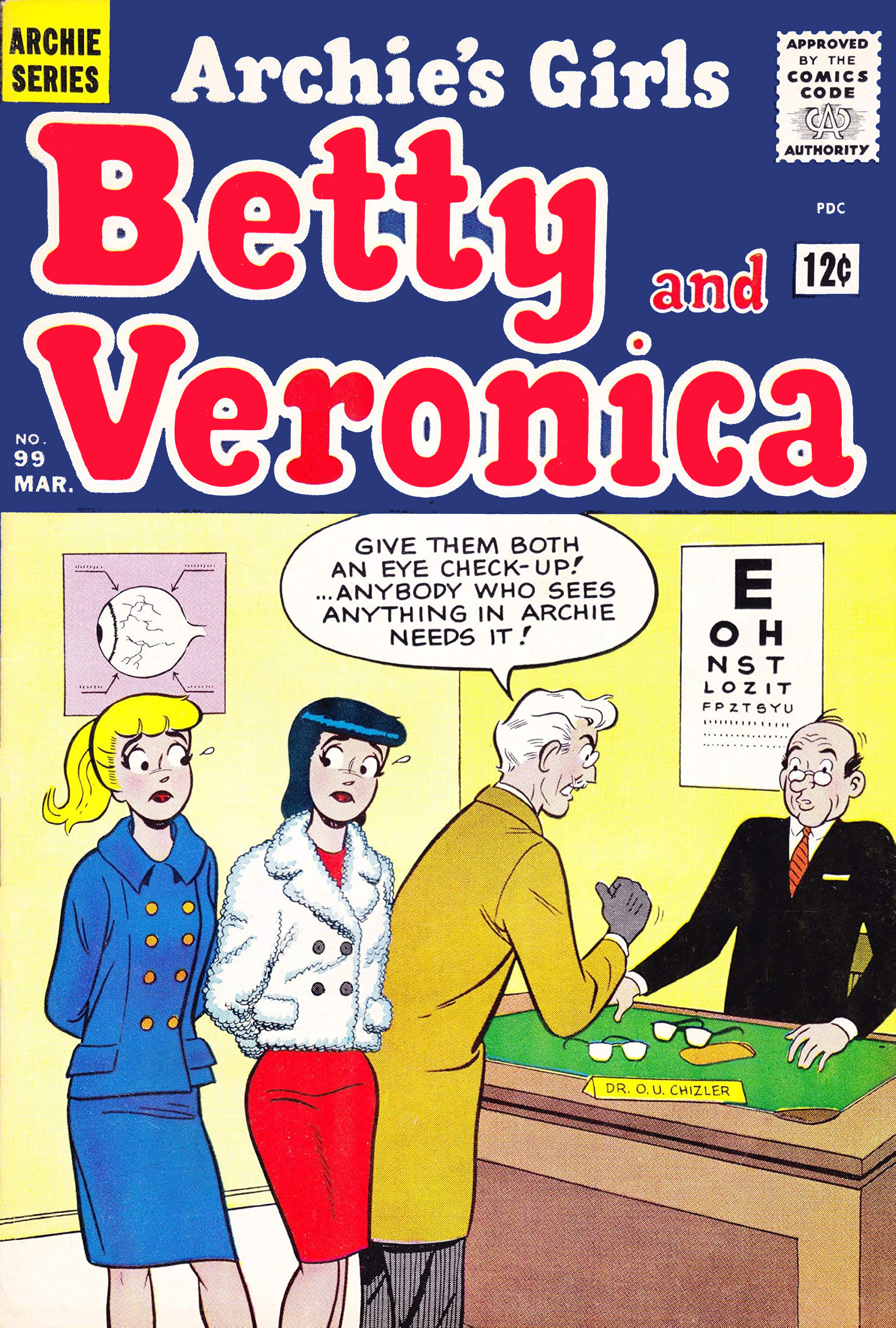
- Cover of Archie's Girls Betty and Veronica #99 (March 1964)

Publication information
- Publisher: Archie Comics
- Schedule: Monthly
- Format: Ongoing
- Publication date: (vol. 1); March 1950 – April 1987 (vol. 2); June 1987 – October 2015 (vol. 3); September 2016 – August 2017
- No. of issues: (vol. 1): 355 (#1–347, plus 8 annuals) (vol. 2): 278 (vol. 3): 3
- Main character(s): Betty Cooper and Veronica Lodge

Creative team
- Written by: Various (vols. 1–2); Adam Hughes (vol. 3)
- Artist(s): Various, including Dan DeCarlo (vols. 1–2); Adam Hughes (vol. 3)

Betty and Veronica (also known as Archie's Girls Betty and Veronica) is an ongoing comic book series published by Archie Comics focusing on "best frenemies" Betty Cooper and Veronica Lodge. Betty first appeared in Pep Comics #22 while Veronica made her debut a few months later, in Pep Comics #26, as an immediate rival to Betty for Archie's affections. Together the pair form the female part of the classic love triangle which has become a staple of the comic series since 1942.

Archie's Girls Betty and Veronica was first published in March 1950 and comprised 347 issues when it ended in April 1987. The run additionally included eight annuals published from 1953 to 1980. A new Betty and Veronica series launched with a #1 in June 1987. This volume ended in late 2015 with 278 issues (625 overall issues if you count volume one). Stories from previous issues of Betty and Veronica have been reprinted in Archie Comics Digest size digest series starring the two.

Betty and Veronica, a new series taking place in their rebooted New Riverdale (Archie Comics) universe, debuted in September 2016. The series was written and drawn by Adam Hughes.

== Volume 1 (1950–1987) ==
=== Significant issues ===
- In issue #4, artist Dan DeCarlo did his first work for Archie, beginning a fifty-year career with the publishing house.
- Issue #118 (October 1965) featured the first appearance of Betty's superheroine alter ego, Superteen, a spoof on the popular superhero comics at the time.
- Issue #320 (October 1982) featured the first appearance of Cheryl Blossom, a redhead from Pembroke who competed with Betty and Veronica for Archie's affection.

== Volume 2 (1987–2015) ==
=== Stories ===
Stories center around the daily life in Riverdale, which includes school, sports, part-time jobs, and romance. Most stories usually feature the two young women as they fight for Archie's affections. On occasion, stories will delve into more serious subjects such as divorce or cheating.

In 2007, a new realistic look for the characters was experimented with but reverted to their traditional appearances in 2008.

At New York Comic Con in 2013, Archie Comics announced that Betty and Veronica would leave Riverdale in Farewell, Betty and Veronica written by Michael Uslan with art by Dan Parent, and that two new female characters would replace them. The six-issue arc, titled Farewell to Betty and Veronica, was published from November 2014 to August 2015 through issues #272-277.

== Volume 3 (2016–2017) ==
=== Story ===
Betty and Veronica was relaunched in 2016 as one of the New Riverdale titles. The series focuses on Pops’ Chocklit Shoppe being taken over by a huge coffee company owned by Veronica's father. Betty and Veronica take opposing viewpoints over the issue.

== Attempted film adaptation ==
In 2003, Archie Comics Entertainment teamed up with Miramax Films to develop a film version of the comic book series, but it was scrapped and it was never materialized.
