= Black Lab discography =

This is the discography of the American rock band Black Lab.

== Studio albums ==
- Your Body Above Me (Geffen, October 21, 1997)
- See the Sun (Self-released, June 2005)
- Passion Leaves a Trace (Self-released, January 16, 2007)
- Two Strangers (Self-released, October 2010)
- A Raven Has My Heart (Self-released, 2014)
- A New World (Self-released, November 2016)
- Blue Star (Self-released, February 2026)

== Extended plays ==
EPs

* I Feel Fine (EP) (Self-released, 2003)
I Feel Fine is an EP by the alternative rock band Black Lab. Four of the six tracks on this album would later be released on their second LP, See the Sun, and a fifth, "Perfect Girl", was re-recorded for the See the Sun album. The last track, "Gone", was re-released on 2007's Passion Leaves a Trace. "Learn to Crawl" appeared on the Music from and Inspired by Spider-Man soundtrack.

Track listing

1. "See the Sun"
2. "Remember"
3. "Perfect Girl" (EP Guitar Mix)
4. "Ecstasy"
5. "Learn to Crawl"
6. "Gone" (Demo)

== Compilations and reissues ==
Compilations and reissues

*Your Body Above Me: The Director's Cut (Self-released, October 2006)
In October 2006, Paul Durham announced that the band's debut album would be re-released as Your Body Above Me: The Director's Cut, with an alternate track listing and two bonus tracks, as well as two minutes of additional music cut from the original tracks.

Re-release track list

1. "Wash It Away"
2. "Can't Keep the Rain"
3. "Time Ago"
4. "Walk Slow"
5. "X-Ray"
6. "Ten Million Years"
7. "Anything"
8. "James"
9. "She Loves Me"
10. "Bring It On"
11. "Sleeps with Angels"
12. "Thin White Lie"
13. "The Big Machine"
14. "Gates of the Country"

*Technologie (Self-released, June 2007, electronica and B-sides)
Technologie consists of several new tracks, remixes of some songs that appeared on the album See the Sun, a song that previously had been released on the soundtrack to Blade: Trinity ("This Blood") and a cover of the theme song to Transformers. The album art is made in the graphical style of the TRS-80 Color Computer, a home computer from the early 1980s.

Track list

1. "Bulletproof"
2. "New Prayer"
3. "River of Joy"
4. "Living Too Fast"
5. "Lonely Boy" (Miss Volatile Remix)
6. "Hole in My Heart"
7. "When Worlds Collide"
8. "Ecstasy" (Switchblade Remix)
9. "Ghost in the Machine" (vocals by Andy Ellis)
10. "Remember" (Motorboat Drama Remix)
11. "A Stone's Throw"
12. "This Blood"
13. "Transformers Theme"

*Give Us Sugar (Self-released, August 2009; B-sides and rarities collection)
Give Us Sugar is a 2-CD compilation album collecting rarities from throughout Black Lab's career, including non-LP B-sides and songs previously exclusive to movie soundtracks. It was intended to be released as a limited edition of only 250 sequentially numbered, autographed copies, but the number of pre-orders far surpassed that limit, so the band changed the publishing and distribution approach. The hand written numbering on the CD front covers still stated the edition number as one of /250 (e.g.: 519/250), and the exact number produced is not known.

CD 1 track list

1. "Underground"
2. "Horses"
3. "Black Eye"
4. "Keep Myself Awake"
5. "Good Day"
6. "Tell Me What to Say"
7. "The Moon"
8. "Hole in the Sky"
9. "Sugar"
10. "Free"
11. "Gone Away"
12. "Lucky"
13. "Not Too Late"
14. "Head on a Skate"
15. "Rock Star"
16. "I am a DJ" (Live)

CD 2 track list

1. "Like I Used To"
2. "Mexican Sand"
3. "Your Body as a Marker"
4. "Good Life"
5. "Philadelphia"
6. "Lust"
7. "Call"
8. "Play With Fire"
9. "Tell Me Why" (Demo)
10. "See The Sun" (Demo)
11. "Perfect Girl" (Demo)
12. "Circus Lights" (Demo)
13. "Come On"
14. "What Child is This"
15. "Body of an Angel"
16. "Gates of the Country" (Acoustic)

*Unplugged (Self-released, November 2011)
Track list
1. "Remember"
2. "Something You Don't Know"
3. "Mine Again"
4. "Fall (Shadows and Blinds)"
5. "Wash It Away"
6. "See The Sun"
7. "Keep Myself Awake"
8. "This Night"
9. "Tomorrow"
10. "Weightless"
11. "This Ship Goes Down Deep"
12. "The Pain Is Gone"
13. "Learn To Crawl"
14. "Circus Lights"
15. "Out Loud"
16. "Time Ago"

*Best of the MP3 of the Month Club (Self-released, December 2012)
Track list
1. "walk this road"
2. "mercy"
3. "let it shine"
4. "radio tonight"
5. "criminal"
6. "a new world"
7. "trace"
8. "candlelight"
9. "give it all"
10. "someone else"
11. "don’t ask me why"
12. "my favorite part of town"
13. "kick"
14. "shine"

== Solo and side projects ==
Solo and side projects

* Ten Million Years – Songs from the Nineteen Nineties (Paul Durham, Self-released, 2004)

* Cake or Death (Cake or Death, Self-released, February 2006)
Cake or Death is a self-titled LP by a group formed as a side project by Paul Durham (lead singer of Black Lab). Durham produced the album, performed as one of the lead vocalists, and co-wrote many of the lyrics.

Track list

1. "Whiplash"
2. "Rise"
3. "Safety"
4. "Cake or Death"
5. "Satisfied"
6. "Bag of Cookies"
7. "Again"
8. "Fandango"
9. "Sweet Abuse"
10. "Let Go"
11. "Silence"
12. "What You Got"
13. "To the End"

Personnel

- Kristin Kelly – vocals, keyboards, flute
- Joshua Leavitt – bass, backing vocals
- Paul Durham – vocals, guitar, percussion
- Olya Mokina – drums, backing vocals

* Mirror Ball Associates: Covers, Vol. 1 (Mirror Ball Associates, Self-released, 2008)

* Stray Palace EP (Stray Palace, Self-released, 2009)
Stray Palace is a side project by Black Lab's Paul Durham. The first release was Stray Palace EP in 2009, and represents "an attempt to weld together the funk of American indie dance-rock and the epic vistas of British new wave".

Track list

1. "Changed"
2. "Free"
3. "Hungry"
4. "Escape"
5. "What I Want"

* The Diamond EP (Stray Palace, Self-released, 2011)
Stray Palace's second EP, The Diamond, was released on June 14, 2011.

Track list

1. "Go"
2. "Love This World"
3. "Beautiful"
4. "Express Yourself"
5. "Here And Now"
6. "Best There Is"
7. "Everyone Come Together"

== Singles ==
| Year | Title | Chart Positions | | | | Album |
| Year | Title | US Modern Rock | US Mainstream Rock | US Adult Top 40 | US Top 40 Mainstream | Album |
|---|---|---|---|---|---|---|
| 1997 | "Wash It Away" | 13 | 6 | – | – | Your Body Above Me |
| 1998 | "Time Ago" | 28 | 26 | 38 | 37 | Your Body Above Me |

== Soundtrack appearances ==
- Note: The Transformers Theme is not a cover of the Mutemath version featured on the soundtrack, but a revision of the theme from the original animated feature, The Transformers: The Movie, from 1987. Originally performed by the band Lion, Paul Durham changed a few lyrics to allow for the absence of the character Unicron that is mentioned in the original track.

| Movie/Show Title | Song Title |
|---|---|
| The Benchwarmers | "Good" |
| Blade: Trinity | "This Blood" |
| Buffy the Vampire Slayer | "Keep Myself Awake" |
| Can't Hardly Wait | "Tell Me What to Say" |
| The Covenant | "River of Joy" (in trailer) |
| Love Wrecked | "Perfect Girl", "Lonely Boy" and "Weightless" |
| Permanent Midnight | "Horses" |
| The Shield | "This Night" (Season 6 promo) |
| Spider-Man | "Learn to Crawl" |
| Varsity Blues | "Black Eye" |
| What I Like About You | "Lonely Boy" (Season 3 Episode 13) "Remember" |
| Transformers | "Transformers Theme" |
| House M.D. | "This Night" (Season 7 Episode 16) |
| Banshee | "This Night" (Season 2 Episode 10 |
| Flashpoint | "Weightless" (Season 2 Episode 6) "The Fortress" |
