= Scout Durwood =

American actress, singer and writer

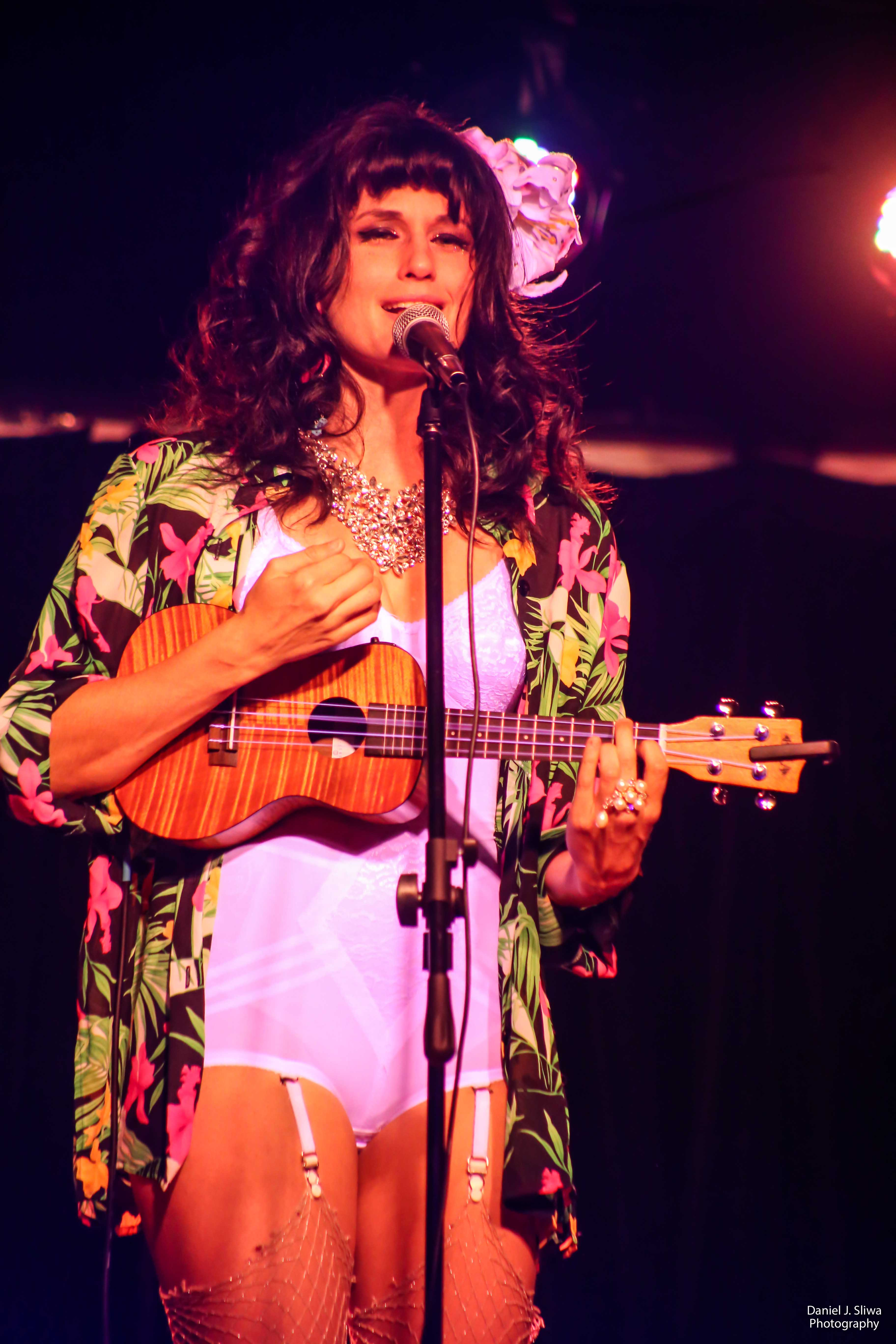
- Durwood Performing in 2018
- Born: Scout Gayle Durwood; Overland Park, Kansas, U.S.
- Education: Amherst College
- Parent(s): Woody Durwood; Marilyn (née Strayer) Durwood

Comedy career
- Years active: 2007–present
- Medium: Stand-up; television; film; music
- Subjects: Existential Comedy; pop culture; parody; satire
- Website: scoutdurwood.com

Scout Durwood is an American comedian, actress, singer, writer, and director. In 2017, she starred in MTV's scripted comedy series Mary + Jane, and her debut studio comedy album, Take One Thing Off, was released on Blue Élan Records. Her twenty-two episode digital series of the same name was nominated for Best Indie Series at the 2019 YouTube Streamy Awards.

Scout is one half of the comedy duo Scout + Avery, who together produce monthly comedy shows at Jam in the Van in Los Angeles, with past lineups including Brett Goldstein and magician Michael Carbonaro.

== Career ==
Durwood was a full-time cabaret singer in New York City and in 2008, Durwood (an out lesbian) competed in Murray Hill's Miss LEZ pageant at the Zipper Factory in New York winning First Runner-up which launched her career in burlesque and cabaret. She moved to Los Angeles in 2012 to pursue a career in film and television. In 2015, she appeared as one of the six cast members in Oxygen (TV channel)'s unscripted series, Funny Girls. In 2017, she starred in the MTV series, Mary + Jane, created by Deborah Kaplan and Harry Elfont. Her half-hour comedy special appeared as part of the Epix series, Unprotected Sets in 2018.

== Performances ==
Durwood tours nationally as a comedian, and has been featured at Edinburgh Fringe Festival, Moontower, Bridgetown Comedy Festival, Slamdance Film Festival, and Outfest among others.
