= Mary + Jane =

American comedy television series

- Genre: Comedy
- Created by: Deborah Kaplan; Harry Elfont
- Starring: Scout Durwood; Jessica Rothe
- Country of origin: United States
- Original language: English
- No. of seasons: 1
- No. of episodes: 10

Production
- Executive producers: Snoop Dogg; Ted Chung; Guymon Casady; Jill McElroy; Marcus Blakely; Harry Elfont; Deborah Kaplan
- Producers: Nellie Nugiel; Matt Lawton
- Running time: 30 minutes
- Production companies: Multi-Start Productions; Entertainment 360; Merry Jane; MTV Production Development

Original release
- Network: MTV
- Release: September 5 – November 14, 2016

Mary + Jane is an American comedy television series that aired on MTV from September 5 to November 14, 2016. The show stars Scout Durwood and Jessica Rothe, and is produced by rapper Snoop Dogg, Deborah Kaplan, and Harry Elfont.

On February 9, 2017, MTV cancelled the show after one season.

== Plot ==
The series follows Paige and Jordan, two young entrepreneurs selling marijuana through a weed-delivery service in Los Angeles.

== Cast and characters ==
=== Main ===
- Scout Durwood as Jordan
- Jessica Rothe as Paige

=== Recurring ===
- Kosha Patel as Jenee
- Dan Ahdoot as Robbie
- H. Michael Croner as Chris

=== Guest ===
- Andy Daly
- Snoop Dogg
- Seth Green
- Missi Pyle
- Leonard Roberts

== Episodes ==
No.	Title	Directed by	Written by	Original release date	US viewers (millions)
1	"Pilot"	Michael Blieden	Deborah Kaplan & Harry Elfont	September 5, 2016	0.45
2	"Girl on Gurl"	Todd Biermann	Deborah Kaplan & Harry Elfont	September 12, 2016	0.47
3	"Sn**chelorette"	Deborah Kaplan & Harry Elfont	Danielle Uhlarik & Jamie Uyeshiro	September 19, 2016	0.41
4	"Jenéeuary"	Tamra Davis	Deborah Kaplan & Harry Elfont	September 26, 2016	0.32
5	"Rehab"	Heath Cullens	Matt Lawton	October 3, 2016	0.33
6	"YouCube"	Tamra Davis	Danielle Uhlarik	October 10, 2016	0.34
7	"Noachella"	Todd Biermann	Maggie Bandur	October 17, 2016	0.35
8	"MarijuanaCon"	Phil Traill	Andie Bolt	October 24, 2016	0.29
9	"Neighborhood Watch"	Phil Traill	Deborah Kaplan & Harry Elfont & Maggie Bandur	November 7, 2016	0.38
10	"420"	Deborah Kaplan & Harry Elfont	Deborah Kaplan & Harry Elfont	November 14, 2016	0.36
