= See the Sun =

See the Sun may refer to:

- See the Sun (Black Lamb album), 2005
- See the Sun (Pete Murray album), 2005
- See See the Sun (1973), an album by Kayak
- "See the Sun" (2003), a song by Dido from her second studio album Life for Rent
- "See the Sun" (2008), a song by The Kooks from their second studio album Konk
