= Liza on Demand =

American web television series

- Genre: Comedy
- Created by: Deborah Kaplan; Harry Elfont; Liza Koshy
- Starring: Liza Koshy; Kimiko Glenn; Travis Coles
- Country of origin: United States
- Original language: English
- No. of seasons: 3
- No. of episodes: 25

Production
- Executive producers: Todd Biermann; Caroline Chewning; Marc Lieberman; Josh Poole; Harry Elfont; Deborah Kaplan; Liza Koshy; Courtney Carter
- Producer: Sam Childs
- Cinematography: Rich Paisley
- Editors: Lane Farnham; Sari Tracht; Peter Mergus; Kyla Plewes
- Camera setup: Single-camera
- Running time: 23–26 minutes
- Production companies: 5 Foot Entertainment; Above Average; Multi Start

Original release
- Network: YouTube Premium
- Release: June 27, 2018 – October 15, 2021

Liza on Demand is an American comedy television series created by Deborah Kaplan, Harry Elfont, and Liza Koshy that premiered on June 27, 2018, on YouTube Premium. The series stars Koshy, Kimiko Glenn, and Travis Coles and follows Koshy as a "tasker" who completes odd jobs around Los Angeles via a phone application. The series was renewed for a second season which premiered on September 25, 2019. In January 2020, the series was renewed for the third and final season, premiering and concluding in October 2021.

== Premise ==
Liza on Demand follows "chaotic misadventures that ensue as the eponymous character takes on various gigs, tasks and odd jobs in her quest to climb the ranks and become an 'elite tasker'."

== Cast and characters ==
Cast Table
Character	Season 1	Season 2	Season 3	Portrayed By
Liza Hertzler	Main			Liza Koshy
Oliver	Main			Travis Coles
Harlow	Main			Kimiko Glenn

=== Main ===
- Liza Koshy as Liza Hertzler, a "tasker" who is trying to make it to "elite status" in her job working for the app, Taskit.
- Travis Coles as Oliver, Liza's roommate and close friend who works for a real estate company.
- Kimiko Glenn as Harlow, Liza's roommate and close friend who owns a show dog named Bark-Paul Gosselaar.

=== Recurring ===
- Jim O'Heir as Don

=== Guest ===
- Noah Schnapp as Evan M. ("Pilot"), a rude teenage Uber rider. Also appears in Season 2, Episode 9 (“ New Year’s Eve”) as Trevor, the son of Mrs. Schulz.
- Jennifer Esposito as Holly ("Pilot"), a mother of three boys that lives in Sherman Oaks who hires Liza to complete a puzzle as part of her son's homework.
- John Gemberling as Rude Man ("Smile"), a man who tells Liza to smile whom she later tricks into inviting her back to his home by pretending to be a man.
- Jessica Tuck as Orchid Owner ("Popular"), a woman who hires Liza to watch her orchid while she is on vacation.
- Chloe Csengery as Alyssa ("Popular"), a student at Mary Richards High School that Liza befriends.
- Froy Gutierrez as Doug ("Popular"), a popular jock at Mary Richards High School with a one-sided crush on Liza.
- Matt McCoy as Clay Coburn ("Simpler Times"), a candidate for the United States Congress.
- Morgan Smith as Martha ("Simpler Times"), an employee of the Coburn campaign.
- Irene Keng as June ("Simpler Times"), a woman hired to attend a Coburn campaign rally because she is Asian-American.
- Lindsey Alley as Elizabeth Coburn ("Simpler Times"), Clay Coburn's wife.
- Eugene Cordero as Nigel ("Valentine's Day"), a Game of Thrones fan who enlists Liza's help to propose to his girlfriend.
- Valerie Harper as Wanda ("Valentine's Day"), an older woman who is spending Valentine's Day alone and hires Liza to pick up her groceries.
- Leonard Roberts as Marc ("Valentine's Day"), a man who hires Liza to help him break up with his boyfriend.
- Greg Cromer as Todd ("Valentine's Day"), a man who hires Liza to deliver a Valentine's Day basket to his lover.
- Tanjareen Thomas as Shannon ("Valentine's Day"), Todd's lover.
- Kate Flannery as Karaoke Woman ("MoJoe"), a woman who hires Liza to take her karaoke machine to a repair shop for her.
- Ken Lerner as Seymour F. ("Phuneral"), a man who hires Liza to deliver food to him and then gives her a one-star rating because the food is too cold.
- Pete Gardner as Father Michaels ("Phuneral"), a priest presiding over Seymour's funeral.
- Matt Malloy as Funeral Director ("Phuneral"), a funeral director at Golden Roads Mortuary, where Liza is hired to serve as a professional mourner.
- Drew Droege as Sebastian Foyeé ("Elite Status"), a famous choreographer who meets Liza at a club after taking cough syrup and ayahuasca. He was under the impression that she was a good dancer while he was high and wanted her to tour with Lady Gaga.
- Seth Morris as Rudy ("Elite Status"), the owner of Rudy's Escape Room, where Liza, Oliver, and Harlow go during a drunken stupor.
- Flula Borg as Chris ("Elite Status"), an assistant to rapper Drake. He returns Liza's lost phone to her after she, Oliver, and Harlow spent time with Drake the previous evening.
- Carolyn Hennesy as Cora Reeves ("What Up, Fam"), a wealthy woman who believes Liza is related to her thanks to a mix-up at a DNA company.
- Josh Peck as Jonas ("Hot, Excited, and In Your Area"), a man who Liza meets that lives off the grid.
- Kevin Nealon as Jim ("Sorry, Not Sorry"), a condescending marketing executive that Liza meets during a focus group testing.
- Chrissie Fit as Katie ("Gentrification: The Musical"), a successful influencer that Liza did TaskIt training with.
- Jason Nash as a guest ("New Year’s Eve"), a guest at Mrs. Schulz New Year's Eve party

== Episodes ==
Season	Episodes	Originally released	
Season	Episodes	First released	Last released
1	8	June 27, 2018	July 25, 2018
2	10	September 25, 2019	
3	7	October 13, 2021	October 15, 2021

=== Season 1 (2018) ===
No. overall	No. in season	Title	Directed by	Written by	Original release date
1	1	"Pilot"	Todd Biermann	Story by : Deborah Kaplan & Harry Elfont & Liza Koshy; Teleplay by : Deborah Kaplan & Harry Elfont	June 27, 2018
2	2	"Smile"	Deborah Kaplan & Harry Elfont	Deborah Kaplan & Harry Elfont	June 27, 2018
3	3	"Popular"	Heath Cullens	Morgan Evans	June 27, 2018
4	4	"Simpler Times"	Deborah Kaplan & Harry Elfont	Isaiah Lester	July 4, 2018
5	5	"Valentine's Day"	Todd Biermann	Deborah Kaplan & Harry Elfont	July 11, 2018
6	6	"MoJoe"	Heath Cullens	Jamie Uyeshiro	July 18, 2018
7	7	"Phuneral"	Anna Mastro	Erin Mitchell	July 25, 2018
8	8	"Elite Status"	Anna Mastro	Deborah Kaplan & Harry Elfont	July 25, 2018

=== Season 2 (2019) ===
No. overall	No. in season	Title	Directed by	Written by	Original release date
9	1	"Naked"	Deborah Kaplan & Harry Elfont	Deborah Kaplan & Harry Elfont	September 25, 2019
10	2	"What's Up, Fam"	Deborah Kaplan & Harry Elfont	Jamie Uyeshiro	September 25, 2019
11	3	"Hot, Excited and In Your Area"	Harry Elfont & Deborah Kaplan	Harry Elfont & Deborah Kaplan	September 25, 2019
12	4	"Sorry, Not Sorry"	Harry Elfont & Deborah Kaplan	Harry Elfont	September 25, 2019
13	5	"The Art of Settling"	Liza Koshy	Jocelyn Richard	September 25, 2019
14	6	"Gentrification: The Musical"	Natalia Anderson	Jake Fogelnest	September 25, 2019
15	7	"Maximum Occupancy"	Natalia Anderson	Jake Fogelnest	September 25, 2019
16	8	"Magic Meadows"	Harry Elfont & Deborah Kaplan	Deborah Kaplan	September 25, 2019
17	9	"New Year's Eve: Part 1"	Todd Biermann	Jamie Uyeshiro	September 25, 2019
18	10	"New Year's Eve: Part 2"	Todd Biermann	Harry Elfont & Deborah Kaplan	September 25, 2019

=== Season 3 (2021) ===
No. overall	No. in season	Title	Directed by	Written by	Original release date
19	1	"Truthousand"	Liza Koshy	Deborah Kaplan & Harry Elfont	October 13, 2021
20	2	"Beach People"	Deborah Kaplan & Harry Elfont	Deborah Kaplan & Harry Elfont	October 15, 2021
21	3	"Hatumentary"	Deborah Kaplan & Harry Elfont	Andy Blitz & Maria Thayer	October 15, 2021
22	4	"Wizard of Esme"	Deborah Kaplan & Harry Elfont	Eliot Glazer	October 15, 2021
23	5	"Lice On Demand"	C. C. Miller	Lillian Yu	October 15, 2021
24	6	"The Invitation"	Deborah Kaplan & Harry Elfont	Deborah Kaplan & Harry Elfont	October 15, 2021
25	7	"Finale"	Deborah Kaplan & Harry Elfont	Deborah Kaplan & Harry Elfont	October 15, 2021

== Production ==
=== Development ===
On November 17, 2017, it was announced that YouTube had given the production a series order for a first season consisting of eight episodes. In addition to starring in the series, Koshy was set to be an executive producer alongside Deborah Kaplan, Harry Elfont, and Courtney Carter. Sam Childs was set as a producer for the series. On January 29, 2018, it was announced that directors for the series were set to include Todd Biermann, Anna Mastro, Heath Cullens, Deborah Kaplan, and Harry Elfont. Kaplan and Elefont will write the series as well. On March 6, 2018, it was reported that the series was expected to be released on YouTube Red in May 2018, but it was later scheduled to premiere in June. On January 24, 2019, it was announced that the series had been renewed for a second season consisting of eight episodes which will premiere on September 25, 2019. On January 18, 2020, it was announced that the series had been renewed for a third season.

=== Casting ===
Alongside the initial series announcement, it was confirmed that Liza Koshy would star in the series. On January 29, 2018, it was announced that Kimiko Glenn and Travis Coles had been added to the main cast as series regulars.

=== Filming ===
The series was reported to be filming in Los Angeles in January 2018. After initial delays due to the COVID-19 pandemic, the first table read for the third season was held on January 29, 2021 and filming began the following week.

== Release ==
=== Marketing ===
On June 3, 2018, Koshy released a video on her YouTube channel, featuring Glenn and Coles, revealing the first season premiere date to be June 27, 2018. A few days later, Koshy released the series' first official trailer. The trailer for season two was released in August 2019.

=== Premiere ===
On June 22, 2018, a "first look" at the series was held during the 9th Annual Vidcon online video conference at the Anaheim Convention Center in Anaheim, California. A question-and-answer session also took place moderated by Entertainment Weekly's Patrick Gomez and included creators Liza Koshy, Deborah Kaplan, and Harry Elfont, and cast members Kimiko Glenn and Travis Coles.

== Reception ==
=== Critical response ===
In a positive review, Decider's Joel Keller recommended viewers stream the series saying, "Stream It. It's a surprisingly well-done show. The episode where Liza tries to retcon her high school experience is especially funny, because of jokes about her roomies acting like her parents and her attempts to not get labeled a pedophile (let's just say, she's really popular)." In a slightly more mixed critique, Robert Lloyd of The Los Angeles Times said that he found the first episode to be rather "ordinary" and "stiff" but that the second episode "goes to some familiar places – hello, I Love Lucy – but to some less expected ones as well and shows off Koshy to good effect, some effective physical comedy included. It made me laugh, anyway."

=== Awards and nominations ===
Year	Award	Category	Nominee(s)	Result	Ref.
2018	Streamy Awards	Comedy Series	Liza on Demand	Won	
2018	Streamy Awards	Acting in a Comedy	Liza Koshy	Won	
2019	Shorty Awards	Best Web Series	Liza on Demand	Nominated	
