= Stone Sour (album) =

Studio album by Stone Sour
- Released: August 27, 2002
- Studio: Catamount (Cedar Falls, Iowa)
- Genres: Alternative metal; nu metal; post-grunge
- Length: 50:57
- Label: Roadrunner
- Producers: Tom Tatman; Stone Sour

Stone Sour chronology
2001 Demo (2001)	Stone Sour (2002)	Come What(ever) May (2006)

Singles from Stone Sour
- 1. "Get Inside" Released: July 2002; 2. "Bother" Released: August 5, 2002; 3. "Inhale" Released: July 7, 2003

Stone Sour is the debut studio album by American rock band Stone Sour. It was recorded and produced by the band and Tom Tatman at Catamount Studios in Cedar Falls, Iowa, and was released on August 27, 2002, through Roadrunner Records.

Writing for the album began in 2000 while vocalist Corey Taylor and guitarist Jim Root were still actively involved in their other band, Slipknot. Work began on the album after Slipknot had gone on hiatus following touring in support of their second album Iowa.

Following the release of the album, Stone Sour went on to promote it for almost a year; releasing three singles and touring in several regions, including the United States and several countries in Europe. The album received generally positive reviews. It was praised for showing a diversity in Taylor's vocals, which was not presented in Slipknot's early albums. It was also certified Gold in the United States and two singles from the album received Grammy Award nominations for Best Metal Performance in consecutive years.

== Development ==
In 2000, Josh Rand contacted Corey Taylor after Taylor had returned from touring in Japan with his other band Slipknot about material he had been working on. Speaking about the experience, Taylor said, "we just started writing stuff and it started to happen". The duo wrote 14 songs and began working in a studio on some demos. Taylor added that it got to a point where he said to Rand, "I think we're going to have to put a real band together, because this is just too serious!" After further enlisting the help of Joel Ekman and previous Stone Sour members Shawn Economaki and Jim Root, the band began working on the album at Catamount Studios in Cedar Falls, Iowa. Before the release of the album, the band went through several different names, most notably Superego, before later announcing that they would use their original name Stone Sour.

== Marketing ==
Prior to the release of the album, the track "Bother" was featured on the soundtrack to the film Spider-Man; however, it was only credited to Corey Taylor. In support of the album, Stone Sour released two singles in quick succession; "Get Inside" was the band's first music video and it included live footage. Released shortly after, "Bother" also featured a music video.

Throughout October and November 2002, Stone Sour toured the United States in support of the album with Chevelle and Sinch. In 2003, the band continued to tour in support of the album; including a European tour with Saliva, an American tour with Powerman 5000, several appearances at European festivals, a UK tour with Murderdolls, amongst others.

The third single from the album, "Inhale," was released in early 2003, shortly after the previously unreleased track "Inside the Cynic" was featured on the soundtrack for Freddy vs. Jason. On October 21, 2003, a special edition version of Stone Sour was released which included "Inside the Cynic", four additional unreleased tracks, a DVD which featured all three music videos and alternative cover artwork.

== Musical style ==
Corey Taylor touted Stone Sour as "melodic hard rock with content and initiative." Jason D. Taylor of AllMusic noted that although it is not displayed on early Slipknot releases, "[Corey] Taylor has the ability to actually sing," citing Alice in Chains and Soundgarden as influences. Jason Taylor went on to state the album gets better after multiple listens. Jeff Modzelewski of 411mania wrote the album mixed "hostility, reservation, brutality and melody." According to Modzelewski, the album has a "mainstream sound" with each of the band's members standing out during one song or another. Don Kaye of Blabbermouth.net felt the message of "Bother" did not differ from Slipknot tracks, but was "presented in an utterly different musical vein". Kaye also felt the album "holds its own ... in terms of heaviness and power." "The band knows how to put together an energetic rocker," wrote NY Rock; elements such as the "melodic twist to the songs ... will please hardcore and metal fans."

== Critical reception ==
Professional ratings
Review scores
Source	Rating
411mania	7.0/10
Allmusic	4/5 stars
Blabbermouth.net	8/10
Counterculture	2.5/5 stars
NY Rock	favorable
The Daily	favorable

Stone Sour received generally positive reviews. Most reviewers offered some comparison to that of vocalist Taylor and guitarist Root's other band Slipknot. While reviewing the album, Don Kaye wrote that "it's rare that a musician offers up another venue for their talents that proves to be equal to their fulltime outfit," stating that Stone Sour is one such case. Rowan Shaeffer of Counterculture stated that "Get Inside" is "the closest to Slipknot that Stone Sour get," even comparing it to the Slipknot single "Left Behind". He cited "the chugging rhythm, manic kick-drums and shout-along vocals" as specific elements that are reminiscent of Slipknot, adding that it was "an obvious choice for a single" as it would not alienate their potential audience of Slipknot fans. Jason D. Taylor noted the similarity in lyrical content to that of Slipknot's; however, he stated that vocalist Taylor comes across as less infuriated which "allows the songs themselves to settle smoothly, yet motivate the listener to feel the emotion". NY Rock stated that the album has a "more balanced feel to it" than that of Slipknot's most recent release at that time, Iowa.

Reviewers also noted upon the album's versatility, specifically that of Taylor's vocal range and abilities. Jeff Modzelewski praised the opening track "Get Inside" explaining, "the scorching speed-metal verse and screaming chorus are played off pretty well against the melodic pre-chorus". Jason D. Taylor cited "Orchids", and "Take a Number" as songs which stand out because they "strike with surprising force for an alternative rock group". On a similar note, Don Kaye said the album includes some "sinister, groove-oriented metal gems that refreshingly stay away from nu metal cliches". The most melodic track on the album, "Bother", received specific attention from most reviewers. Modzelewski said that the track "seems to be the song that the album has been preparing everyone for", further adding that Taylor proves "that he is a legitimate vocalist who doesn't need to rely on destroying his vocal cords to make a good song". In his review, Rowan Shaeffer stated the track was a specific highlight, but said that the change in style was "at odds with the rest of the material" on the album.

In 2003, Stone Sour's first single from the album, "Get Inside", was nominated for the Best Metal performance at the 45th Grammy Awards. On March 20, 2003, Stone Sour was certified Gold in the United States. The following year, the album's third single, "Inhale", was also nominated for Best Metal Performance at the 46th Grammy Awards.

== Track listing ==
All tracks are written by Stone Sour, except where noted. All tracks are performed by Stone Sour, except where noted.

No.	Title	Writer(s)	Performer(s)	Length
1.	"Get Inside"			3:13
2.	"Orchids"			4:24
3.	"Cold Reader"			3:41
4.	"Blotter"			4:02
5.	"Choose"			4:17
6.	"Monolith"			3:45
7.	"Inhale"			4:25
8.	"Bother"	Corey Taylor	Corey Taylor	4:00
9.	"Blue Study"			4:37
10.	"Take a Number"			3:42
11.	"Idle Hands"			3:56
12.	"Tumult"	Stone Sour, Ryan Weeder		4:03
13.	"Omega"			2:52
Total length:				50:57

Japanese bonus tracks
No.	Title	Length
14.	"Inside the Cynic"	3:24
Total length:		54:21

Special Edition bonus tracks
No.	Title	Writer(s)	Performer(s)	Length
14.	"Rules of Evidence"			3:44
15.	"The Wicked"			4:55
16.	"Inside the Cynic"			3:24
17.	"Kill Everybody"	Corey Taylor, Josh Rand	Corey Taylor, Josh Rand, Dan Spain	3:26
18.	"Road Hogs"	Corey Taylor, Josh Rand	Corey Taylor, Josh Rand, Dan Spain	3:53
Total length:				70:19

Special Edition music videos
No.	Title	Length
1.	"Inhale"	4:25
2.	"Bother"	4:14
3.	"Get Inside"	3:14

Deluxe Edition bonus CD (Live at House of Bricks, Des Moines, Iowa — December 7, 2001)
No.	Title	Length
1.	"Intro (Superego)"
2.	"Get Inside"
3.	"Orchids"
4.	"The Wicked"
5.	"Idle Hands"
6.	"Choose"
7.	"Rules of Evidence"
8.	"Inhale"
9.	"Blue Study"
10.	"Cold Reader"
11.	"Blotter"
12.	"Monolith"

== Personnel ==
Stone Sour

- Corey Taylor − vocals (all); guitar (8); piano (12); production (8)
- James Root − guitar (except 13, 17, 18)
- Josh Rand − guitar (except 13); bass (17, 18); production (17, 18); reissue front and back cover photography
- Shawn Economaki − bass (except 13, 17, 18)
- Joel Ekman − drums (except 13, 17, 18)

Additional musciains

- Sid Wilson − turntables (2, 3, 6)
- Denny Gibbs − Hammond organ (7, 15)
- Dan Spain – drums (17, 18)

Technical personnel

- Tom Tatman − production, engineering (all); mixing (17, 18)
- Stone Sour – production
- Jon Chamberlain − additional engineering
- Toby Wright − mixing
- Elliot Blakely − mixing assistant
- Yen-Hue Tan − mixing assistant
- James Barton − production, engineering, mixing, string arrangement (8)
- Patrick Thrasher − engineering, pro tools editing, string arrangement (8)
- J.J. Farriss – string arrangement (8)
- Stephen Marcussen − mastering
- Paul Logus – remastering on deluxe vinyl edition, mastering on live tracks
- Stewart Whitmore – digital editing

Art personnel

- Lynda Kusnetz − creative director
- T42design − art direction, design
- Ken Schles − photography
- Sean Mosher Smith – reissue design

== Charts ==
=== Weekly charts ===
Weekly chart performance for Stone Sour
Chart (2002)	Peak position
French Albums Chart	131
German Albums Chart	94
Japanese Albums Chart	70
Scottish Albums	45
UK Albums Chart	41
US Billboard 200	46

=== Year-end charts ===
Year-end chart performance for Stone Sour
Chart (2002)	Position
Canadian Alternative Albums (Nielsen SoundScan)	144
Canadian Metal Albums (Nielsen SoundScan)	69

== Certifications ==
Certifications for Stone Sour
Region	Certification	Certified units/sales
Canada (Music Canada)	Gold	50,000^{‡}
United Kingdom (BPI)	Gold	100,000^{‡}
United States (RIAA)	Gold	500,000^{^}
^{^} Shipments figures based on certification alone.^{‡} Sales+streaming figures based on certification alone.
