= Cake or Death =

Cake or Death may refer to:

- "Cake or Death", a skit from Dress to Kill (1998), by Eddie Izzard
- Cake or Death (Cake or Death album), 2006
- Cake or Death (Lee Hazlewood album), 2006
