= Made of Honor =

2008 American romantic comedy film by Paul Weiland

- Theatrical release poster
- Directed by: Paul Weiland
- Screenplay by: Adam Sztykiel; Deborah Kaplan; Harry Elfont
- Story by: Adam Sztykiel
- Produced by: Neal H. Moritz
- Starring: Patrick Dempsey; Michelle Monaghan; Kevin McKidd; Kathleen Quinlan; Sydney Pollack
- Cinematography: Tony Pierce-Roberts
- Edited by: Richard Marks
- Music by: Rupert Gregson-Williams
- Production companies: Columbia Pictures; Relativity Media; Original Film
- Distributed by: Sony Pictures Releasing
- Release date: May 2, 2008
- Running time: 101 minutes
- Country: United States
- Language: English
- Budget: $40 million
- Box office: $106.4 million

Made of Honor is a 2008 American romantic comedy film directed by Paul Weiland and written by Adam Sztykiel, Deborah Kaplan, and Harry Elfont. The film stars Patrick Dempsey, Michelle Monaghan, and Sydney Pollack.

The plot follows a lifelong playboy who falls in love with his best friend, only to have her get engaged. She asks him to be her maid of honor. The film was released by Sony Pictures Releasing in the United States on May 2, 2008, and garnered unfavorable reviews from critics, but grossed $106.4 million worldwide.

== Plot ==
On Halloween night 1998 amidst his senior year at Cornell University, Tom Bailey Jr., dressed as Bill Clinton, enters the dark dorm room of Monica, his pre-arranged date. Thinking Monica is in the bed, he climbs in and she maces him with perfume. It was actually Monica's geeky roommate, Hannah. They flirt but he insults her. When Hannah and Tom return to the dorm room, a drunken Monica is there waiting, but he does not stay. Ten years later, Tom is now wealthy in New York City as his coffee collar invention pays him a dime every time one is used. Hannah, also in the city, has stayed best friends with him ever since that night in college. Tom continues to sleep with a different girl every week, while Hannah stays single, focusing on her career at the Metropolitan Museum of Art.

Tom takes Hannah to his father Thomas Sr.'s sixth wedding. They share an intimate moment when they dance; however, Tom still thinks of her as his best friend. After the wedding, Hannah tells Tom that she has a six-week work trip to Scotland. Tom realizes that, being with a different woman week after week is not fulfilling when he cannot see Hannah. Realizing he has feelings for Hannah, Tom decides to tell her when she returns.

Hannah does not come back alone; she brings Colin McMurray, a wealthy Scottish Duke, as her fiancé. Asking Tom to be her maid of honor he accepts. He does so to spend time with Hannah, convince her to stop the wedding and win her heart. As Hannah's maid of honor, Tom is introduced to the three bridesmaids. One is Melissa, Hannah's cousin and an ex, whose heart he broke and is now upset that she is not the maid of honor. Melissa sabotages the bridal shower by tricking him into inviting Sharon, a sex toy saleswoman, as a party entertainer. Believing it was Tom's idea, Hannah gets upset and almost fires Tom, but thanks to his friends' "How to Be a Perfect M-O-H 101" course, he wins her trust back. Taking her shopping, he impresses her with a plate-juggling performance. Hannah enjoys it, but reveals she is moving to Scotland after the wedding.

Tom, almost accepting defeat, continues being a responsible maid of honor by traveling to Scotland with Hannah. After their arrival at Eilean Donan Castle, he meets Colin's family. They have a variant of the Highland games, in which the groom competes to prove himself worthy of his bride. Tom also participates, hoping to defeat Colin, but he loses in the last round. At the rehearsal dinner, Colin's family proudly tells Hannah (who opposes the killing and eating of animals) that every plate of meat on the table is from animals that Colin killed. Later that night, Tom offers to help go over her vows. As he starts to tell her his feelings, the other bridesmaids interrupt, dragging Hannah to her bachelorette party.

Hannah has to give every man in the pub a peck for a coin (Scottish tradition), including Tom. When it is his turn, without anyone looking, he passionately kisses her, and she kisses back. Afterwards, Hannah goes to Tom's room to discuss the kiss but sees Melissa, in a drunken stupor, trying to seduce him. Seeing Hannah at the door, he pushes Melissa off and runs after her. Hannah refuses to let Tom into her room and she tells him she is still marrying Colin the next day. The distressed Tom gives up being the maid of honor as he cannot bear to watch them marry, so he decides to go back home.

As he is leaving the next morning, Tom realizes that he must stop the wedding immediately, telling the driver to turn back. Finding the only ferry unavailable, he borrows a horse to ride to the ceremony. As he is riding up to the church doors, the horse stops, sending him flying through the chapel doors and interrupting the wedding. Hannah rushes to Tom's side and he declares his love. She realizes she loves Tom back and kisses him passionately, calling off the wedding and apologizing to Colin, who punches Tom in the face. Tom and Hannah go back to New York together, getting married on a rooftop under the stars and live happily ever after.

== Cast ==
- Patrick Dempsey as Tom Bailey Jr.
- Michelle Monaghan as Hannah
- Kevin McKidd as Colin McMurray
- Kadeem Hardison as Felix
- Chris Messina as Dennis
- Richmond Arquette as Gary
- Busy Philipps as Melissa
- Whitney Cummings as Stephanie
- Emily Nelson as Hilary
- Kathleen Quinlan as Joan
- Sydney Pollack as Thomas Bailey Sr.
- James B. Sikking as Reverend Foote
- Kevin Sussman as Tiny Shorts Guy
- Beau Garrett as Gloria
- Christine Barger as Psycho Blogger
- Kelly Carlson as Christie Bailey
- Hannah Gordon as Dierdre McMurray
- Eoin McCarthy as Cousin Ewan
- Clive Russell as Cousin Finlay
- Myra McFadyen as Aunt Minna
- Mary Birdsong as Sharon
- Elisabeth Hasselbeck as Herself
- Sarah Wright as Sexy Blonde
- Jaime Ray Newman as Ariel
- Ellie Knauss as Monica

== Production ==
The filming schedule was 26 days to accommodate Patrick Dempsey's commitments to Grey's Anatomy. Dempsey was part of the project before the director was chosen and agreed to Paul Weiland after seeing an early cut of his coming-of-age film Sixty Six. The scene where Tom Bailey (Dempsey) juggles plates was not in the script and was added on the day.

Eilean Donan castle, the home of Connor MacLeod (Christopher Lambert) in the film Highlander, was used for exterior shots of one of the McMurray family homes.

== Release ==
Made of Honor had a celebrity screening at the Soho Hotel in London on April 21, 2008. It was released in the United States by Sony Pictures Releasing on May 2, 2008.

The film was released on DVD and Blu-ray by Sony Pictures Home Entertainment on September 16, 2008.

== Reception ==
=== Box office ===
On its opening weekend, the film grossed $15.5 million in 2,729 theaters in the United States and Canada, averaging $5,679 per theater, and ranking #2 at the box office behind Iron Man. It grossed a total of $46 million in North American and $60 million internationally, for a total worldwide gross of $106 million, against its $40 million budget.

=== Critical response ===
Made of Honor received unfavorable reviews from critics, with some critics calling it a gender swapped version of My Best Friend's Wedding. On the website Rotten Tomatoes, the film holds an approval rating of 15% based on 124 reviews, with an average rating of 4.1/10. The website's critics consensus reads, "Sharp performances by Patrick Dempsey and Michelle Monaghan can't save this forgettable, formulaic chick flick from its comic failings." On Metacritic, the film holds a weighted average score of 37 out of 100, based on 25 critics, indicating "generally unfavorable" reviews. Audiences surveyed by CinemaScore gave the film a grade B+ on scale of A to F.

Keith Phipps of The A.V. Club gave the film an overall C grade, giving credit to the performances of Sydney Pollack and Monaghan for being surprisingly good in a by-the-numbers romantic story alongside Dempsey displaying "plastic sincerity" in his role, saying: "It's telling that he's followed by a string of sidekicks apparently created to make him less bland by comparison." The New York Times' Stephen Holden commended the punch-up of the script for adding "tart satirical flavors to a cotton-candy formula" and the screen presence of both Dempsey and Monaghan, highlighting the latter for giving "enough sweetness to satisfy the cotton-candy addicts." Barbara Vancheri of the Pittsburgh Post-Gazette praised the utilization of the "picturesque, romantic" Scotland setting and the cast's willingness to perform, despite devolving into slapstick comedy and tacking on a 1940s film ending. She concluded by explaining its release alongside Iron Man saying: "Made of Honor is made to order for women or couples looking for an alternative to the comic-book adaptation and for a romcom with such obvious and memorable film forebears, it's still breezy fun."

Elizabeth Weitzman from the New York Daily News gave credit to Dempsey for his comedic timing over material containing "snickering emasculation" and director Paul Weiland for his "brisk pace" direction over "a lazy script from three screenwriters who take the low road every time." She concluded that: "The cinematic equivalent of a cookie-cutter wedding, Made of Honor ultimately feels a little depressing." Philip Marchand of the Toronto Star noted how the film's content contains "numerous references to insecure masculinity", saying that: "It's often a problem to determine when a movie is satirizing characters from a superior height and when it's sharing the mental level of those characters." Peter Bradshaw of The Guardian said about the film beyond its "gibberish" title: "Everything else about it is plasticky and nonsensical with no one behaving like a real carbon-based life-form. Monaghan's charm is stifled, and a classy cameo from Sydney Pollack as Dempsey's scapegrace dad goes for nothing. A film to leave at the altar." Ed Gonzalez from Slant Magazine called the film "soul-crushingly predictable", lamenting the misuse of Pollack's "ostensible prestige" only for it to be diminished by Kevin Sussman's character, unfunny sex jokes, an irritating soundtrack and defamation of Scottish people.

The film was nominated for Choice Movie – Bromantic Comedy at the 2008 Teen Choice Awards, but ultimately lost to What Happens in Vegas.
