= Leap Year (2010 film) =

2010 film by Anand Tucker

- Theatrical release poster
- Directed by: Anand Tucker
- Written by: Harry Elfont; Deborah Kaplan
- Produced by: Gary Barber; Chris Bender; Roger Birnbaum; Jonathan Glickman; Jake Weiner
- Starring: Amy Adams; Matthew Goode; Adam Scott; John Lithgow
- Cinematography: Newton Thomas Sigel
- Edited by: Nick Moore
- Music by: Randy Edelman
- Production companies: Universal Pictures; Spyglass Entertainment; BenderSpink
- Distributed by: Universal Pictures (United States); Optimum Releasing (Ireland and United Kingdom)
- Release dates: January 6, 2010 (New York City); January 8, 2010 (United States); February 26, 2010 (Ireland)
- Running time: 100 minutes
- Countries: United States; Ireland
- Language: English
- Budget: $19 million
- Box office: $32.7 million

Leap Year is a 2010 romantic comedy film directed by Anand Tucker and written by Harry Elfont and Deborah Kaplan. Leap Year stars Amy Adams and Matthew Goode. The plot revolves around Anna Brady, who decides to travel to Dublin to propose to her boyfriend on leap day, as Irish tradition allows.

Principal photography took place in County Wicklow, Dublin, County Mayo, and County Galway, including the Aran Islands, Connemara, Temple Bar, Georgian Dublin, Wicklow National Park, and Olaf Street, Waterford.

Leap Year premiered in New York City on January 6, 2010, and was released theatrically on January 8, 2010, by Universal Pictures in the United States and on February 28 by Optimum Releasing in Ireland. The film grossed $32.7 million against its $19 million production budget. It received mostly unfavorable reviews from critics.

== Plot ==
Boston real estate stager Anna Brady is frustrated that Jeremy, her boyfriend of four years, has still not proposed, even though they are about to move into an upscale apartment together. She decides to travel to Dublin, where he is attending a cardiology conference.

A storm diverts Anna's plane to Cardiff, Wales. She hires a boat to take her across the Irish Sea to Ireland, but due to the storm, she is put ashore in the small seaside village of Dingle. Anna offers to pay Declan O'Callaghan, who runs the local pub, to give her a ride to Dublin. He initially refuses, but as his pub is threatened with foreclosure, he agrees to drive her for €500. Along the way, she tells him she plans to invoke an Irish tradition, Bachelor's Day, which allows women to propose to men on February 29. Declan mocks the concept.

When cows block the road, Anna exits the car to shoo them away, and steps in a cow pat. She leans on the car while cleaning her shoes, causing it to roll downhill into a stream. They continue on foot, until a van with three travellers stops and offers a lift. Ignoring Declan's warning, Anna hands them her suitcase first. Before she can get into the van, they drive off without her. Anna and Declan continue walking to a roadside pub, where they find the travellers. Declan fights them and retrieves Anna's bag.

They make their way to a train station and while waiting, they visit the adjacent Ballycarbery Castle on foot. They ask each other what they would grab if their homes were on fire and they had only 60 seconds to leave. Absorbed in conversation, they miss the train, and have to stay the night at a bed and breakfast in Tipperary. They pretend to be married so their conservative hosts will let them share the room. During dinner, when the other couples kiss to show their love for each other, Anna and Declan feel obliged to kiss as well. This stirs feelings neither had expected. They sleep in the same bed, but do not admit their new feelings.

The next day, they continue hitchhiking, but a hailstorm forces them to shelter in a church, where a wedding is taking place. They are invited to the reception, where Anna gets drunk. She begins to question her relationship with Jeremy and realizes she has feelings for Declan. As they are about to kiss, she vomits and passes out. They arrive in Dublin the following day. Declan reveals he was once engaged, but his fiancée ran off to Dublin with his best friend and his mother's Claddagh ring. Anna suggests that while in Dublin, he should ask for the ring back. When they arrive at Jeremy's hotel, Jeremy surprises Anna by proposing to her in the lobby. Seeing that Declan has already left, she accepts Jeremy's proposal.

At their engagement party back in Boston, Anna discovers why Jeremy proposed; the co-op board of the apartment building were unlikely to approve their application if they were not married. Dismayed, she pulls the fire alarm and waits, testing the 60-second concept she and Declan discussed. Jeremy grabs all their electronic devices, leaving Anna to look after herself. She realizes there is nothing in the apartment that means anything to her, including Jeremy. Meanwhile, in Dublin, Declan retrieves his mother's Claddagh ring from his ex-fiancée.

Anna returns to the pub in Dingle, where Declan has raised the money to pay his debt with the help of the community. She tells him she has broken off her engagement and proposes that they get together, and not make plans. Declan leaves. Thinking she has been rejected, Anna rushes outside to the edge of a cliff overlooking the sea. Declan emerges, revealing that he went out to retrieve his mother's Claddagh ring. Declan says he wants to make plans with her, and proposes. Some time later, they drive away in Declan's car with a "Just Married" sign and Anna tosses aside the map, leaving their destination open to fate.

== Cast ==
- Amy Adams as Anna Brady
- Matthew Goode as Declan O'Callaghan
- Adam Scott as Jeremy Sloane
- John Lithgow as Jack Brady
- Kaitlin Olson as Libby Brady
- Noel O'Donovan as Seamus
- Tony Rohr as Frank
- Pat Laffan as Donal
- Alan Devlin as Joe
- Ian McElhinney as Priest
- Vincenzo Nicoli as Stefano
- Flaminia Cinque as Carla
- Peter O'Meara as Ron
- Dominique McElligott as Bride
- Liza Ross as Edith

== Production ==
On October 17, 2008, it was announced that Amy Adams was to star in the film as Anna Brady. On November 23, Anand Tucker signed on to direct the film, with Harry Elfont and Deborah Kaplan collaborating on the screenplay.

On February 12, 2009, it was announced that Matthew Goode would be playing the role of Declan O'Callaghan, the surly innkeeper. On March 18, it was announced that Adam Scott was to play Jeremy Sloane, Anna's long time boyfriend, and that Kaitlin Olson would play Libby, Anna's best friend.

The film was shot in County Wicklow, Dublin, County Mayo and County Galway, with filming taking place in and around the Aran Islands, Connemara, Temple Bar, Georgian Dublin, Wicklow National Park and Olaf Street, Waterford.

On October 19, it was announced that Randy Edelman had been chosen to compose the film's score. The decision to choose Edelman came as a surprise, as Tucker had used Barrington Pheloung for two of his previous films, Hilary & Jackie and When Did You Last See Your Father?.

== Soundtrack ==
An audio CD soundtrack for Leap Year was released on the Varèse Sarabande record label on January 12, 2010. That album contains only the original score, composed and conducted by Randy Edelman. The musical selections that were used, and credited at the end of the film, are not available on the CD. Those include:

- "More and More of Your Amor" by Nat "King" Cole (Bitter:Sweet's production released 2009)
- "I Want You" by Kelly Clarkson
- "I'll Tell My Ma" by the Colonials featuring Candice Gordon
- "The Irish Rover" by the Colonials featuring Candice Gordon
- "Day to Day" by Eulogies
- "Waltz with Anna" by the Brombies
- "Patsy Fagan" by Dessie O'Halloran and Sharon Shannon
- "Within a Mile of Home" by Flogging Molly
- "Buffalo Gals" by the Brombies
- "A Pint for Breakfast" by the Brombies
- "Leaping Lizards" by the Brombies
- "The Staunton Lick" by Lemon Jelly
- "Dream a Little Dream" cover by Cass Elliot
- "Only Love Can Break Your Heart" by Gwyneth Herbert
- "Never Forget You" by Noisettes
- "You Got Me" by Colbie Caillat, over the closing scene/credits
- "Just Say Yes" by Snow Patrol, used in the trailer

== Release ==
The film opened at the American box office at number 6, with a modest $9.2 million, behind blockbusters Avatar, Sherlock Holmes, Alvin and the Chipmunks: The Squeakquel, as well as Daybreakers and It's Complicated. The film's final gross of $25.9 million in the United States against a production budget of $19 million. In addition to this, the film made $6.8 million in international markets, for a total worldwide gross of $32.7 million.

Leap Year was released on DVD in the United States on May 4, 2010. It debuted at number 4 on the American DVD rentals chart, with a first week rental index of 56.63. It placed 5th on the DVD sales chart, selling an estimated 159,843 units, and has sold almost 800,000 units in total to April 2013.

== Reception ==
On Rotten Tomatoes the film has an approval rating of 24% and an average rating of 4.30/10, based on reviews from 144 critics. The site's critical consensus reads: "Amy Adams is as appealing as ever, but her charms aren't enough to keep Leap Year from succumbing to an overabundance of clichés and an unfunny script." On Metacritic the film has a weighted average score out of 33 out of 100 based on 30 critics, indicating "generally unfavorable" reviews. Audiences surveyed by CinemaScore gave the film an average grade "B" on an A+ to F scale.

Roger Ebert of the Chicago Sun-Times gave it three out of four stars, and described Leap Year as a "full-bore, PG-rated, sweet rom-com". "It sticks to the track, makes all the scheduled stops, and bears us triumphantly to the station". Owen Gleiberman of Entertainment Weekly gave the film a B− grade, stating that the film could have used more "pizzazz".

Nathan Rabin of The A.V. Club, gave it a grade of C− and concluded, "The film functions as the cinematic equivalent of a Shamrock Shake: sickeningly, artificially sweet, formulaic, and about as authentically Gaelic as an Irish Spring commercial". A. O. Scott of The New York Times saw it as "so witless, charmless, and unimaginative, that it can be described as a movie only in a strictly technical sense". Richard Roeper gave it a C−, stating that it had a "recycled plot, lame sight gags, Leprechaun-like stock Irish characters," adding that "the charms of Amy Adams rescue Leap Year from Truly Awful status".

Donald Clarke of The Irish Times gave the film one star out of five, and in a scathing review, described it as "offensive, reactionary, patronising filth" and cited it as evidence that "Hollywood is incapable of seeing the Irish as anything but IRA men or twinkly rural imbeciles". Paul Whitington of the Irish Independent described the film as "grotesque and insulting paddywhackery" and said Goode "struggle[d] badly with his accent".

The film's lead actor Matthew Goode admitted "I just know that there are a lot of people who will say it is the worst film of 2010," and revealed that the main reason he signed on to the film was so that he could work close to home and be able to see his girlfriend and newborn daughter.
