= Morgan Smith (actress) =

American actress

Morgan Smith Goodwin
- Born: 1985 or 1986 (age 39–40)
- Occupation: Actress
- Years active: 2011–present
- Known for: TV commercial ads as Red, a.k.a. "Wendy's Girl" for Wendy's restaurants in 2012–16
- Spouse: Dave Ridgway Goodwin (2009-present)
- Children: 2

Morgan Smith-Goodwin (born 1985 or 1986) is an American actress. She has had recurring roles on the television series Veep and Messiah. She is best known as Red, the "Wendy's Girl" in TV commercial ads for Wendy's restaurants in 2012–16.

== Career ==
After graduating from college, she moved to New York City, where she had performed in concerts, readings, and benefits. She was an original cast member of the Off-Broadway production, Freckleface Strawberry.

Smith gained national attention when she was selected to be the face of Wendy's Restaurants' advertising campaign, titled Now That's Better. Television commercials carrying that theme began airing in April 2012. Naturally a dark blonde, her hair was dyed "orangey red" for the commercial role. Smith relocated to Los Angeles, CA after being cast as series regular Shelby Fox opposite Craig T. Nelson in NBC's reboot of Coach. After the show was not picked up, she went on to recur as Candi Caruso in Seasons 5 and 6 of Veep. She recurred as Agent Alison Rhymer in the Netflix series Messiah.

== Personal life ==
Smith is married to David Ridgway "Dave" Goodwin, manager of Gramercy Tavern in New York City.

== Filmography ==
=== Television ===
Year	Title	Role	Notes
2012	Boardwalk Empire	—N/a	Episode: "The Milkmaid's Lot"
2016–2017	Veep	Candi Caruso	6 episodes
2018	Whitney and Britni	Whitney Hicks	6 episodes
2018	Liza on Demand	Martha	Episode: "Simpler Times"
2019	Why Women Kill	Bethany	Episode: "I Found Out What the Secret to Murder Is: Friends. Best Friends."
2020	Messiah	Agent Rhymer	2 episodes
2020	9-1-1	Kendall	Episode: "Pinned"
2020	Love in the Time of Corona	Gigi	Episode: "#RelationshipGoals"
2022-2023	How I Met Your Father	Alice	

=== Video games ===
Year	Title	Role
2017	Mass Effect: Andromeda	Additional voices
2019	Anthem	Additional voices
