= Inhale (song) =

Single by Stone Sour

from the album Stone Sour
- Released: July 7, 2003
- Recorded: 2002 at Catamount Recording Studio, Cedar Falls, Iowa
- Length: 4:18
- Label: Roadrunner
- Songwriter(s): Corey Taylor; Jim Root; Josh Rand; Shawn Economaki; Joel Ekman
- Producer(s): Tom Tatman; Stone Sour

Stone Sour singles chronology
| "Bother" (2002) | "Inhale" (2003) | "30/30-150" (2006) |

"Inhale" is a song by American rock band Stone Sour, featured on their 2002 debut album Stone Sour. Released as the third single by the band in July 2003, the song charted at number 18 on the American Billboard Hot Mainstream Rock Tracks chart, while reaching number 63 on the UK Singles Chart. The song was nominated for the Grammy Award for Best Metal Performance at the 2004 ceremony, losing out to Metallica's "St. Anger".

== Music video ==
The music video for "Inhale" was shot in Los Angeles (as seen on the street sign one minute into the duration), directed by Gregory Dark and produced by Sharlotte Blake (executive) and Patti Tessel (line). It shows the band members as homeless people in their daily activities. Corey pushes a trolley containing clothes, Jim plays the guitar on the street for money, Joel collects donations, Josh rummages in trash cans for food, and Shawn eats food given to him by roadside vendors. Towards the second chorus the band is seen in white tuxedos, performing in front of an audience. Shawn is seen playing a double bass instead of a normal bass guitar. At the start of the chorus, the band changes to their shaggy unkempt look and their suits are frayed and torn. As Corey starts the chorus, the people in the audience start disappearing one by one. After the final chorus the band is seen back at their area around a fire. It is revealed that the performance is just an imagination. The video ends with the band going off to sleep, with Corey looking one last time at the fire.

== Track listing ==
All tracks are written by Stone Sour.

CD single Europe (2003)
| No. | Title | Length |
|---|---|---|
| 1. | "Inhale" | 4:18 |
| 2. | "Inside the Cynic" | 3:23 |
| 3. | "Inhale" (unedited rough mix) | 5:32 |
| 4. | "Inhale" (video) | 4:13 |

Promo CD single US (2003)
| No. | Title | Length |
|---|---|---|
| 1. | "Inhale" (radio edit) | 4:02 |
| 2. | "Inhale" (album version) | 4:18 |

Promo CD single UK (2003)
| No. | Title | Length |
|---|---|---|
| 1. | "Inhale" | 4:24 |

Promo CD single Benelux (2003)
| No. | Title | Length |
|---|---|---|
| 1. | "Inhale" (radio edit) |

Promo CD single Europe (2003)
| No. | Title | Length |
|---|---|---|
| 1. | "Inhale – LPV" | 4:19 |
| 2. | "Inside the Cynic" | 3:24 |
| 3. | "Inhale" (rough mix) | 5:33 |

== Chart positions ==
| Chart (2003) | Peak position |
|---|---|
| UK Singles (The Official Charts Company) | 63 |
| US Billboard Hot Mainstream Rock Tracks | 18 |

== Personnel ==
Stone Sour

- Corey Taylor – vocals, production
- James Root – guitar, production
- Josh Rand – guitar, production
- Shawn Economaki – bass, production
- Joel Ekman – drums, production

Additional personnel

- Denny Gibbs – Hammond organ on "Inhale"
- Tom Tatman – production, mixing on "Inhale" (unedited rough mix)
- Toby Wright – mixing on "Inhale" and "Inside the Cynic"
