= Bother (song) =

Single by Stone Sour

from the album Music from and Inspired by Spider-Man and Stone Sour
- Released: August 5, 2002
- Recorded: 2001
- Genre: Post-grunge
- Length: 4:00
- Label: Roadrunner
- Songwriter: Corey Taylor
- Producers: Tom Tatman; Stone Sour; James "Jimbo" Barton

Stone Sour singles chronology
"Get Inside" (2002)	"Bother" (2002)	"Inhale" (2003)

"Bother" is the second single from the American rock band Stone Sour's self-titled debut album. It was originally released as a solo song by frontman Corey Taylor, but the billing was later changed to Stone Sour. The song was one of Stone Sour's first songs to put them into the mainstream. The cover features Taylor's hands and rings, one of them being a Spider-Man ring which is a reference to the song's debut appearance on the soundtrack to the film Spider-Man (although the track is credited to Taylor as the performer, not Stone Sour) and to Taylor being a fan of the superhero. The other has the number eight on it, representing Taylor's number in Slipknot. Taylor has stated that the song is about when he moved back to Des Moines from Denver, where he hoped to try to move forward with his music.

In 2024, Taylor released a remix/follow-up song titled Bother '23 (Still Not Bothered) on his compilation album CMF2...or Not 2B for Record Store Day. It features cover songs and unreleased B-sides.

== Music video ==
The music video shows Taylor standing face-to-face with an exact copy of himself in a large room. As the two sing, Taylor's copy begins to rapidly age, and eventually dies and turns to dust as the other band members surround the two Taylors. All that is left of the copy is his Spider-Man ring, which the other Taylor puts on his own finger, encompassing his own Spider-Man ring. This video was directed by Gregory Dark.

== Track listing ==
CD single cardboard sleeve Europe (2002) / CD single UK (2003)
No.	Title	Length
1.	"Bother"	3:57
2.	"Rules of Evidence"	3:44

CD single enhanced Europe (2002) and Australia (2003)
No.	Title	Length
1.	"Bother"	3:57
2.	"Rules of Evidence"	3:44
3.	"The Wicked"	4:54
4.	"Bother" (video)	4:06

Promo CD single US (2002)
No.	Title	Length
1.	"Bother" (from Spider-Man)	3:57

Promo CD single Australia (2002)
No.	Title	Length
1.	"Bother"	4:00

Promo CD single cardboard sleeve UK (2002)
No.	Title	Length
1.	"Bother" (radio version)	3:57
2.	"Bother" (album version)	3:57

CD single Japan (2003)
No.	Title	Length
1.	"Bother"	3:57
2.	"Rules of Evidence"	3:44
3.	"The Wicked"	4:55

== Charts ==
Chart performance for "Bother"
Chart (2002−2003)	Peak position
Australia (ARIA)	41
Belgium (Ultratop 50 Flanders)	42
Europe (Eurochart Hot 100)	87
Netherlands (Dutch Top 40)	25
Netherlands (Single Top 100)	40
New Zealand (Recorded Music NZ)	43
Quebec Airplay (ADISQ)	12
Scottish Singles Sales (Official Charts)	28
UK Singles (Official Charts)	28
UK Rock & Metal (Official Charts)	2
US Billboard Hot 100	56
US Adult Pop Airplay (Billboard)	27
US Alternative Airplay (Billboard)	4
US Mainstream Rock (Billboard)	2

== Certifications ==
Certifications and sales for "Bother"
Region	Certification	Certified units/sales
Australia (ARIA)	Gold	35,000^{‡}
Canada (Music Canada)	Platinum	80,000^{‡}
New Zealand (RMNZ)	Gold	15,000^{‡}
United States (RIAA)	Gold	500,000^{‡}
^{‡} Sales+streaming figures based on certification alone.

== Release history ==
Release dates and formats for "Bother"
Region	Date	Format(s)	Label(s)	Ref.
United States	August 5, 2002	Alternative radio	Roadrunner	
United States	August 19, 2002	Mainstream rock; active rock	Roadrunner	
United States	December 2, 2002	Contemporary hit; hot AC radio; triple A radio	Roadrunner	
United Kingdom	February 1, 2003	CD	Roadrunner	
Australia	February 10, 2003	CD	Roadrunner	
