= Tony Rohr =

Irish actor (1939–2023)

- Born: Harold Anthony Rohr; 21 May 1939; Carrick-on-Suir, Ireland
- Died: 29 October 2023 (aged 84)
- Occupation: Actor
- Years active: 1966–2023
- Children: 1

Harold Anthony Rohr (21 May 1939 – 29 October 2023) was an Irish actor.

== Career ==
Rohr played Grandad in The Lakes and Solomon Featherstone in Middlemarch. He also appeared in The Bill, The Long Good Friday, McVicar, Softly, Softly, Crown Court, The Sweeney, Casualty, Lovejoy, I Hired a Contract Killer, Cracker, The Vet, Father Ted, Waking the Dead, Hustle and Inspector George Gently (in the memorable role of "China").

He played the railway station master in the 2010 film Leap Year. He also played the IRA Brigade Commander in Yorkshire TV's Harry's Game. He later played Anthony, the estranged father of the title character, Derek, in the series of the same name written and directed by Ricky Gervais.

== Personal life and death ==
Rohr had a daughter, Louise, with actress Pauline Collins. Collins gave baby Louise up for adoption in 1964. They were reunited 22 years later. Collins' book, Letter To Louise, documents these events.

Rohr died from prostate cancer on 29 October 2023, at the age of 84.

== Filmography ==
Year	Title	Role	Notes
1978	Terror	Villager #3	
1980	McVicar	Bootsie Hagan	
1980	The Long Good Friday	O'Flaherty	
1982	Angel	George	
1983	Ascendancy	Chauffeur	
1985	No Surrender	McCarthur	
1985	Code Name: Emerald	Patrick Callaghan	
1986	Rocinante	Stan	
1988	High Spirits	Christy	
1989	Desmond's	Priest	
1990	I Hired a Contract Killer	Frank the Doctor	
1992	The Playboys	Kelly	
1992	Into the West	Traveller	
1997	The Butcher Boy	Bogman in Mental Hospital	
1998	The Nephew	Crony #1	
1998	Titanic Town	Cork Driver	
1998	The Tale of Sweety Barrett	Flick Hennessy	
1999	Most Important	Paudie O'Neill	
2008	Hustle	Archie	
2009	Dead Man Running	Mr. Jeff	
2010	Leap Year	Frank	
2010	Mr. Nice	Landlord	
2010	Round Ireland with a Fridge	Willy	
2012	Les Misérables	Overseer	
2013	The Double	Rudolph	
2013–2014	Derek	Anthony	
