= Myra McFadyen =

Scottish actress (1956–2024)

- Born: 12 January 1956; Maryhill, Glasgow, Scotland
- Died: 18 October 2024 (aged 68)
- Occupation: Actress

Myra McFadyen (12 January 1956 – 18 October 2024) was a Scottish actress. She had a decades-long career on stage and screen.

== Biography ==
McFadyen was born in Maryhill, Glasgow. She studied at the Royal Conservatoire of Scotland in Glasgow and worked at the Royal National Theatre in London.

She first worked in television in 1984. She appeared in the film Made of Honor. As a stage actress she worked with the National Theatre of Scotland. In 2007 she starred in Eeting Beauty at the Tron Theatre. In the West End, she appeared in productions such as Mamma Mia! and A Christmas Carol at the Old Vic. In 2008, she portrayed Elena in the film Mamma Mia!.

She died on 18 October 2024.
