= Black Lab =

American alternative rock band

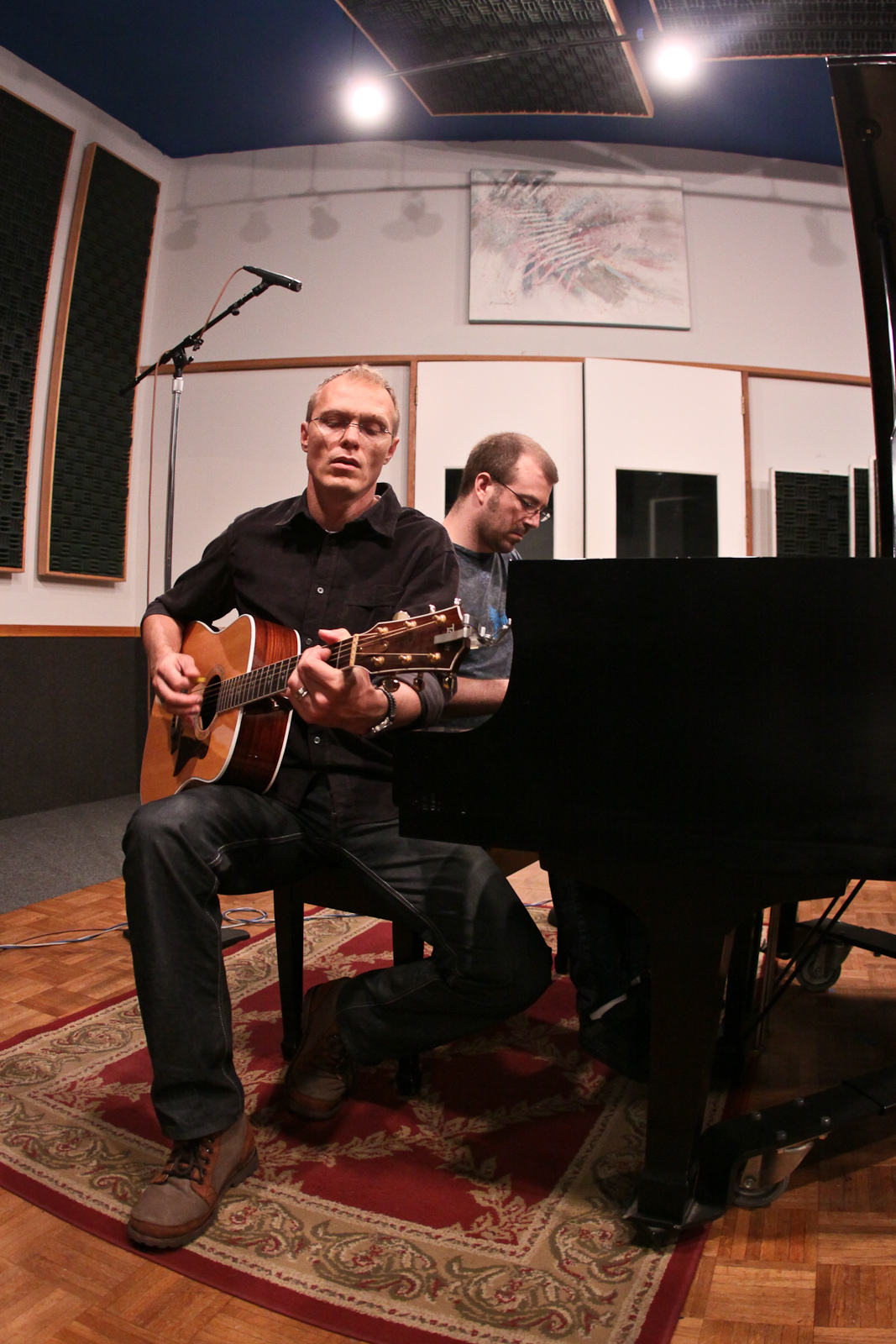
- Black Lab, circa 2005. Andy Ellis, r; Paul Durham, l. Paul Durham

Background information
- Origin: Berkeley, California, U.S.
- Genre: Alternative rock
- Years active: 1995–present
- Labels: Geffen, Epic
- Members: Paul Durham; Andy Ellis; Brian Paturalski; Isaac Carpenter
- Past members: Michael Urbano; Michael Belfer; Geoff Stanfield; Bryan Head; Eve Hill; Scotty Coogan
- Website: blacklabworld.com

Black Lab is an alternative rock band founded by Paul Durham in Berkeley, California, and currently based in Los Angeles and Montana.

They released their debut album on Geffen Records, entitled Your Body Above Me, and scored two rock radio hits in the US, "Wash It Away" and "Time Ago". After leaving Geffen in 1999, the band signed to Epic Records, contributing a track to Sony's Spider-Man before leaving the label.

Since 2003, the band has independently released nine full-length albums, an EP, and a live concert DVD/CD set. Passion Leaves a Trace, released in 2007, featured the single "Mine Again" and gained significant exposure through internet media outlets and a film trailer. "This Night" was used as the theme song for the season six trailer for FX's The Shield, and was featured in House and Banshee. Paul Durham and Andy Ellis are currently the core members.

The band works with Secret Road Music Services to make the band's music available for licensing.

== History ==
=== Your Body Above Me (1995–1999) ===
Twin Falls, Idaho native Paul Durham's singing career began when he was offered a spot singing in a local youth choir. After graduating from Oberlin College, Durham supported himself as a substitute teacher in the San Francisco Bay Area while fronting his acoustic band, Durham. Durham did not have any official releases, but some of their recorded material was released in 2004 as part of Paul Durham's solo album Ten Million Years. Paul Durham disbanded this band in 1995, signed to Geffen Records in 1996 after attracting attention from a number of labels, and joined bassist Geoff Stanfield, guitarist Michael Belfer and drummer Michael Urbano to form Black Lab. The name is an amalgamation of two of the band's influences, Black Sabbath and Stereolab.

Their debut album, Your Body Above Me, co-produced by David Bianco and the band, was released on October 21, 1997 in the United States. Two singles from the album charted in the U.S., the power ballad "Time Ago" and the alternative rock hit "Wash It Away"; the album also featured the PJ Harvey co-write "All the Money in the World". The LP peaked on Billboard's Heatseekers charts at No. 19 in 1998, and sales of the album eventually topped 120,000. Reviews of Your Body Above Me noted the album's dark, melodic modern rock sound, and were generally positive. The Washington Post called Your Body Above Me "moodily sumptuous", Guitar Player described the music as having "drama and rhythmic urgency", and Allmusic noted the album's "brooding yet propulsive sound that's actually quite intriguing". The band subsequently toured with Fuel, Days of the New, Cracker, and Our Lady Peace, and were called "The American U2" by the San Francisco Chronicle. Black Lab songs were featured on soundtracks to Can't Hardly Wait, Varsity Blues, Permanent Midnight, and Buffy the Vampire Slayer, and the song "Wash It Away" was also included on a charity album, Live in the X Lounge. Just as momentum was building on their debut, however, Geffen went out of business after being subsumed by Universal; dissatisfied with the new label arrangement, Durham moved to Los Angeles, and the band broke up in 1999.

=== See the Sun (2000–2005) ===
In 2000, Paul Durham re-formed Black Lab with an alternate lineup after Epic Records expressed an interest in releasing a second album from the band. The band was quiet until 2002, which saw the release of "Learn to Crawl" on the Spider-Man soundtrack, with a band consisting of Paul Durham, Andy Ellis, bassist Eve Hill and drummer Scotty Coogan. The electronic-flavored result was described as "tightly spun, highly melodic rock" by Rolling Stone.

After a series of delays, Black Lab asked to be released from Epic; legal problems with the record label ensued, but the band won the rights to the master recordings of the material they had been working on. While searching for a new label, the band self-released a six-song EP in 2003, first online and then on CD, which featured "Learn to Crawl" and the single "See the Sun". However, the planned second full-length, called See the Sun, wouldn't see light until 2005, after the band decided on an independent release. See the Sun did not receive any mainstream press coverage, but online reviews noted the band's turn toward increasing use of keyboards and synthesizers to introduce and underlay tracks, describing it as "startling, but in a good way". The band benefited heavily from promotion from online rock site Alternative Addiction, who included the track "Lonely Boy" on one of its compilations, regularly reports on the band's music, and places them in heavy rotation on its internet radio station.

After leaving the major labels, Black Lab essentially ceased touring, fearing that a self-booked and promoted national tour would not be cost-effective. They maintained a relationship with fans via their website and MP3 of the Month Club, through which users were able to subscribe to monthly tracks of new content, such as soundtrack songs, unreleased works, and insights into the band's songwriting process.

=== Passion Leaves a Trace and other projects (2006–2009) ===
Early in 2006, Durham and a few of his old friends reacquainted to record as a side project, called Cake or Death. This band, featuring Kristin Kelly, Joshua Leavitt and Olya Mokina, have recorded one full-length self-titled LP. At the end of October 2006, Paul also announced that a special "Director's Cut" edition of Your Body Above Me was being released. The rerelease contained two songs originally recorded for the album, extended cuts of several songs, new liner notes and photos. A third Black Lab album, entitled Passion Leaves a Trace, was released on January 16, 2007. The track "This Night" was featured on the promotional advertisement for the sixth series of The Shield; tracks from this album were also featured in CBS's Numb3rs, ABC's 6 Degrees and the films The Benchwarmers and Lovewrecked. The song was also featured in the television series House M.D. in season 7 episode 16, and the Season 2 finale of Cinemax's Banshee.

The band attracted media attention in March 2007 through the campaign "Bum Rush the Charts", in which one of their songs was promoted through podcasting and blogging. The aim of this was to harness independent media and music to promote unsigned bands and to raise money for a scholarship fund. As a result of this effort, on March 22, 2007, the single "Mine Again" was purchased over 14,000 times in the United States. The iTunes charts represent a weekly average of purchases, not just “a snapshot of the previous 24 hours’ worth of sales,” as a spokesman for Apple reported in The Washington Post about the campaign. “Mine Again,” however, still cracked the top 100 songs on the U.S. chart at No. 99, and peaked at No. 11 on the U.S. rock chart. The campaign had a significant international impact, selling songs in every country in which iTunes has stores and pushing "Mine Again" to No. 53 on the Canadian chart (#10 rock), No. 15 in the Netherlands (#2 rock), and No. 73 in Germany (#12 rock), among others. The song broached the iTunes rock charts in eleven additional countries as well. Songs from the album also became popular on the PMC Top10 podcast, with three of them reaching the site's year-end Top 10: "Mine Again" (#8), "Broken Heart" (#6), and "Hole in My Heart" (#5).

In June 2007, Black Lab released its second album of the year, Technologie. It is described as an album of electronica, techno-rock and remixes. It features remixes of previously released songs, several songs released on movie soundtracks and brand new material, including the band's cover of the Transformers theme song.

In 2009, the band released Give Us Sugar, a compilation of assorted rarities from throughout their career including non-LP B-sides and songs previously exclusive to movie soundtracks. It was intended to be released as a limited edition of only 250 autographed copies, but the number of pre-orders far surpassed that limit, forcing the band to change the publishing and distribution approach.

=== Two Strangers, Unplugged, A Raven Has My Heart, Live at the Mercury Lounge, A New World (2010–present) ===
On October 19, Black Lab released Two Strangers. Two Strangers introduces orchestrations and pianos by Jonathan Grand on several tracks, cello by Jesse Ahmann and Banjo by Paul Bohak, on track 11.

In November 2011, Black Lab released their first acoustic album which features unplugged versions of 13 previously released Black Lab songs, as well as 3 new songs.

In April 2014, Black Lab released A Raven Has My Heart. This is the first Black Lab album to be crowd-funded on Kickstarter. The funding was successful, raising over $75,000 and resulting in live performances in Los Angeles and New York City in August 2014 (recorded and released on a DVD/2-CD set).

In November 2016, Black Lab released A New World. The album includes "The Road," featured in Season 3 Episode 6 of Banshee.

In May 2020, Black Lab released the single "In a Moment".

In December 2022, Black Lab released their rendition of Christmas carol "What Child is This." The song credits Black Lab and Paul Durham, respectively.

In December 2023, Black Lab released the single "Walk Slow".

== Band members ==
=== Current members ===
- Paul Durham – lead vocals, guitar, Pro Tools (1995–present)
- Andy Ellis – guitar, keyboards, programming (2000–present)
- Brian Paturalski - bass, guitar, programming
- Isaac Carpenter - drums, percussion
- Deej Hofer
- Alex Kemp

=== Former members ===
- Michael Belfer – guitar (1996–1999, died 2022)
- Geoff Stanfield – bass guitar (1996–1999)
- Bryan Head – drums, percussion (1997–1999)
- Eve Hill – bass guitar (2000–2003)
- Scotty Coogan – drums, percussion (2000–2003)
- Michael Urbano – drums, percussion (1996–1997)
- Josh Freese - drums, percussion (1999) (Recorded only 3 songs with the band, one of which was released on Give Us Sugar)

== Discography ==
- Your Body Above Me (1997)
- See the Sun (2005)
- Passion Leaves a Trace (2007)
- Two Strangers (2010)
- A Raven Has My Heart (2014)
- A New World (2016)
- Siren (2026)

== Photos ==
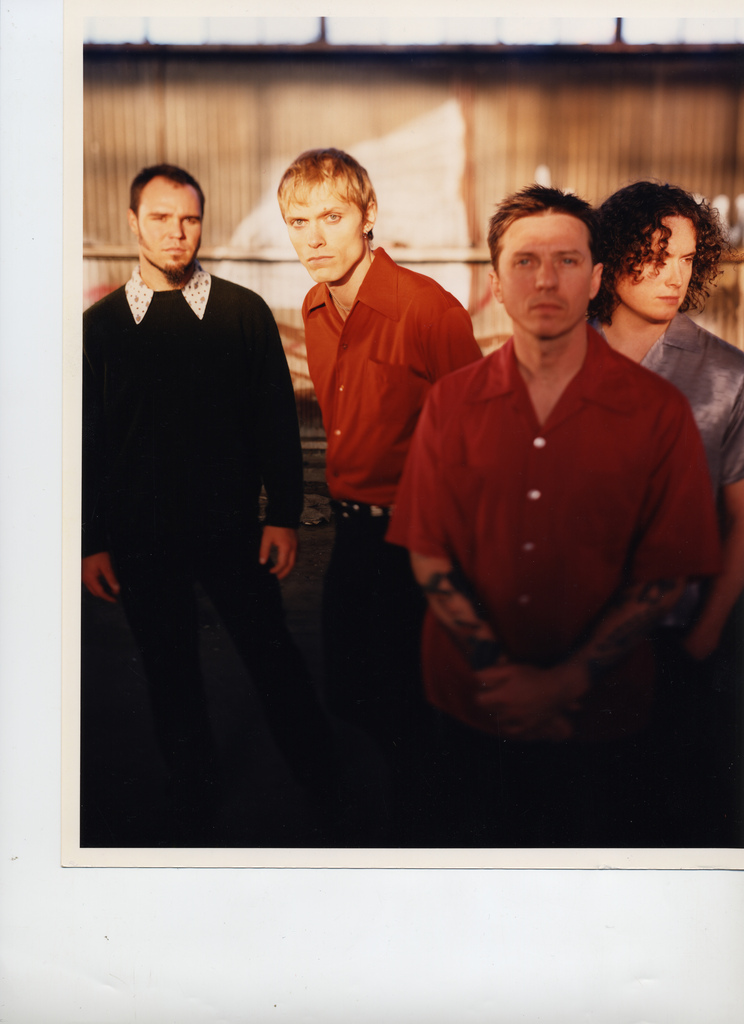
Black Lab touring band in 1998

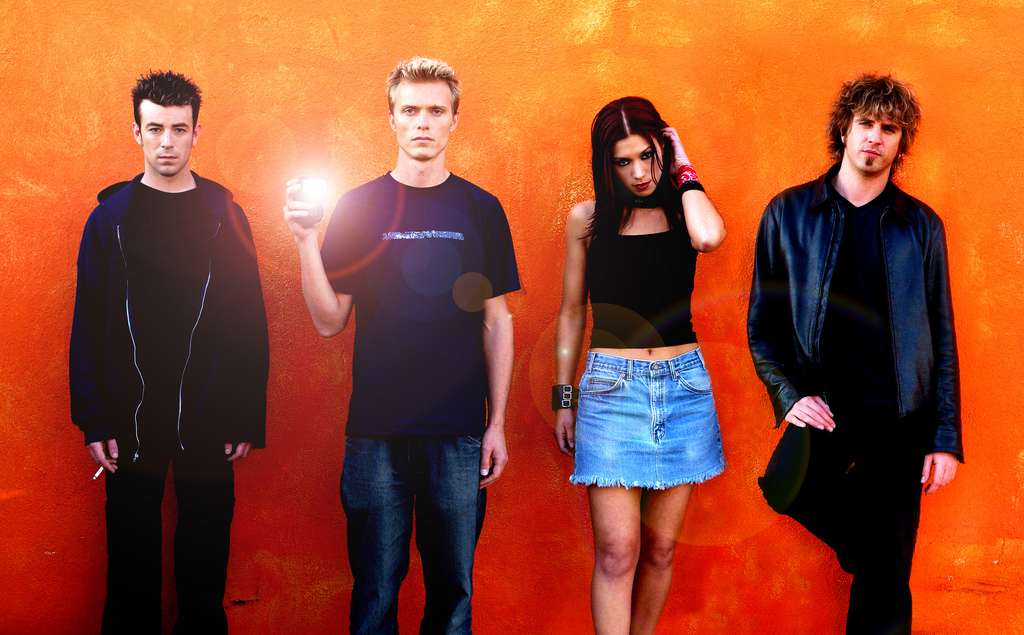
Black Lab, See the Sun era

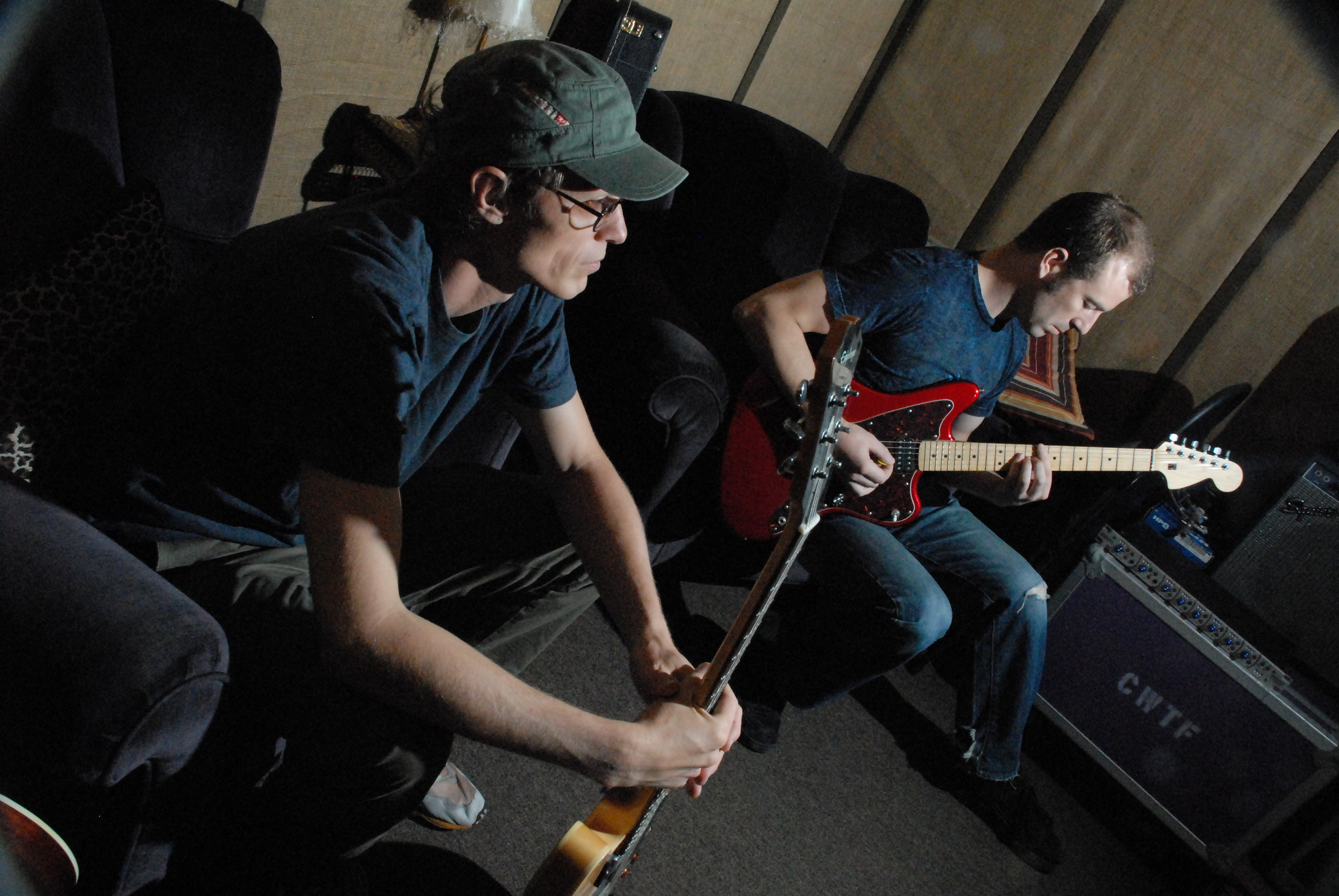
Paul and Andy working on Two Strangers

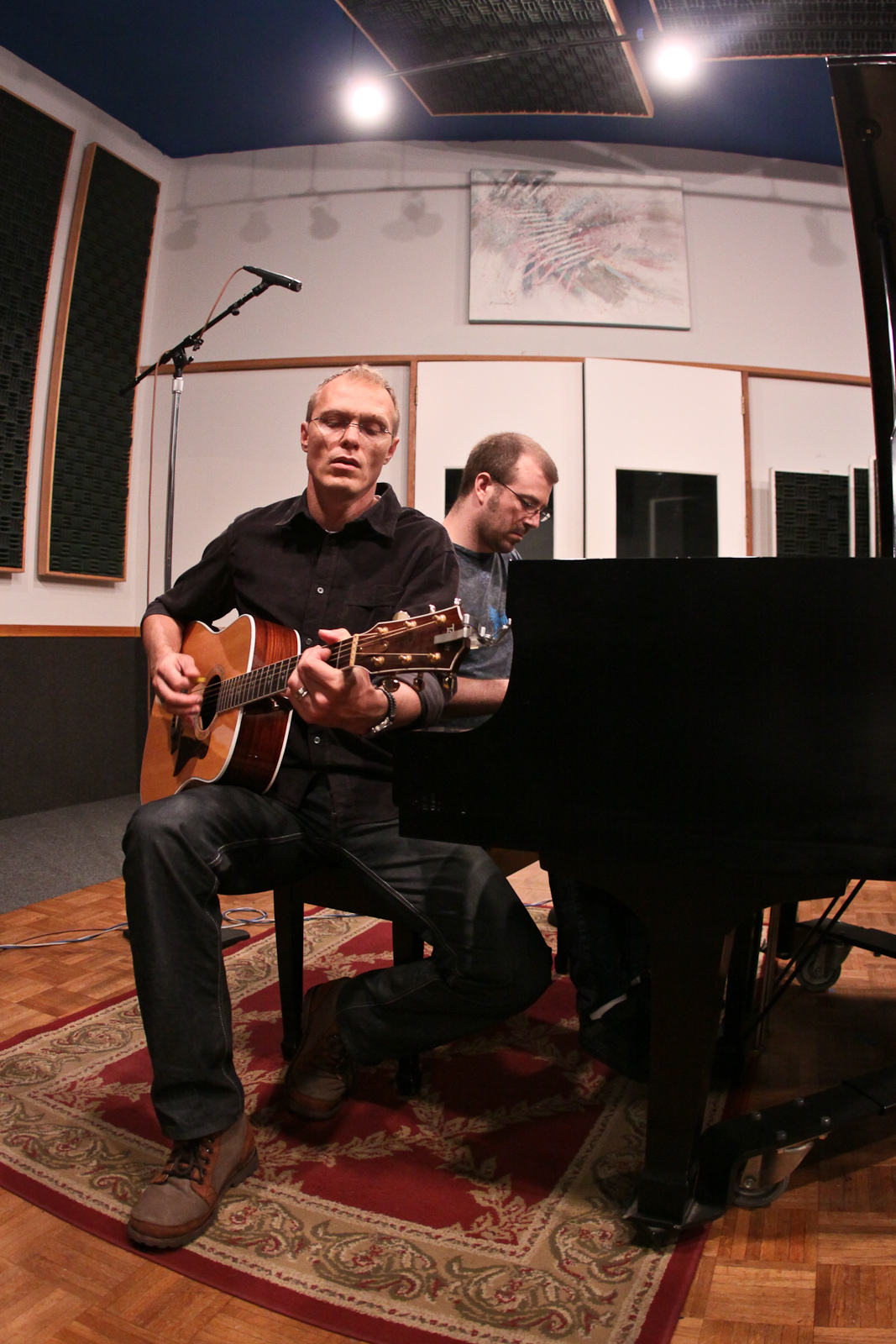
Paul and Andy recording Unplugged in 2011
