= See the Sun (Black Lab album) =

Studio album by Black Lab
- Released: June 2005
- Genre: Alternative rock
- Label: Blacklabworld.com
- Producer: Black Lab

Black Lab chronology
I Feel Fine (2003)	See the Sun (2005)	Passion Leaves a Trace (2007)

Professional ratings
Review scores
Source	Rating
Whisperin & Hollerin	(9/10)

See the Sun is the second LP by the American alternative rock band Black Lab. The album was released eight years after their debut, Your Body Above Me. Five of the twelve songs on the album had been released in 2003 on the EP I Feel Fine including "Learn to Crawl" that first appeared in Music from and Inspired by Spider-Man.

== Track listing ==
No.	Title	Length
1.	"See the Sun"	4:10
2.	"Remember"	3:35
3.	"Lonely Boy"	3:39
4.	"Perfect Girl"	3:11
5.	"Ecstasy"	3:59
6.	"Tell Me Why"	4:19
7.	"Without You"	4:13
8.	"Dream in color"	3:19
9.	"Learn to Crawl"	3:37
10.	"Wide Open"	3:43
11.	"Lifelike"	4:07
12.	"Circus Lights"	4:10
