= Montclair College Preparatory School =

Private school in Van Nuys, California, United States (1956–2012)

Location
- 8071 Sepulveda Blvd; Van Nuys, California 91402; United States; 34.2175°N 118.46667°W

Information
- Type: Private
- Motto: Things Worth Having Are Most Difficult To Obtain
- Established: 1956
- Founder: V. E. Simpson
- Closed: July 15, 2012
- President: Mark Simpson
- Principal: Walter Steele
- Faculty: 40
- Grades: 6–12
- Enrollment: 350
- Campus: Urban
- Colors: Blue and White
- Athletics: None
- Nickname: The Mounties
- Website: www.montclairprep.com

Montclair College Preparatory School, also commonly known as "Montclair Prep", was a school located in Van Nuys, Los Angeles, California, near Panorama City. The school taught grades 6 through 12, and later grades 9-12 only.

== History ==
Founded in 1956 by the late Vernon E. Simpson, Montclair College Preparatory School was one of the oldest private, co-educational, independent, secondary schools in the San Fernando Valley. A rigorous, traditional college preparatory education was offered to students in grades six through twelve.

The school was governed by a board of directors which set the overall direction of the school. Montclair Prep maintained faculty academic advisement and standards committees that worked with the administration to maintain the highest caliber of academics and to provide a small group of social, athletic, and cultural extracurricular activities for its students.

In May 2011, Gazi Kabir, a social studies teacher, was arrested for having sex with a 15-year-old student on multiple occasions. He was previously accused of misdemeanor in 2007, and his teaching certificate had been suspended for misconduct for two weeks by the California Commission on Teacher Credentialing.

During the 2000s the school's American football team saw increasingly little participation, and switched to eight-man football. In July 2011, Montclair announced that it was dropping all athletic programs, as well as the middle school portion of the school. In addition, seventy percent of the faculty was laid off. In the summer of 2012, Montclair announced its closure effective July 15.

== Activities ==
Publications by students include Junior Statesman of America, the school's yearbook; its middle school Montclairion newspaper; the Montclair Journal; Scientifically Speaking, a science-oriented publication; and Wings, the school's literary magazine.

== Notable alumni ==
=== Arts and entertainment ===
- Paul Thomas Anderson, film director, screenwriter and producer
- Danny Bonaduce, entertainer, radio DJ
- Rob Cavallo, Emmy-winning record producer, executive
- Cher, entertainer
- Eddie Cibrian, actor
- Stephen Dorff, entertainer
- Angel Faith, singer
- Curtis Hanson, film director, screenwriter
- Hayley Hasselhoff, entertainer
- Michael Jackson, entertainer
- Khloé Kardashian, media personality
- Michael Kuluva, entertainer and designer
- Daren Kagasoff, actor
- Sara Paxton, entertainer
- Danny Pintauro, entertainer
- Eve Plumb, entertainer
- Tony Pro, fine artist
- Nicole Richie, socialite and entertainer
- Frank Sinatra Jr., entertainer
- Randy Spelling, actor
- Sage Stallone (1976–2012), entertainer
- Eliel Swinton, actor Varsity Blues (1999)
- Ashley Tesoro, actress, model, singer
- Robin Thicke, entertainer
- Ryan Alberts, designer and artist manager

=== Sports ===
- Kevin Bentley, professional football player
- Frank Charles, professional baseball player
- Jarron Collins, professional basketball player and coach
- Jason Collins, professional basketball player
- Toi Cook (born 1964), professional football player
- Max Fried (born 1994), baseball pitcher for the New York Yankees
- Brad Fullmer, professional baseball player
- Torey Lovullo, professional baseball player and coach
- Eshaya Murphy, professional basketball player
- Russ Ortiz, professional baseball player
- Tim Stallworth, professional football player
- Eliel Swinton, professional football player
