= Eliel Swinton =

American football player and actor (born 1975)

- Born: March 27, 1975 (age 51); West Hills, Los Angeles
- Occupation: actor

Eliel Swinton (born March 27, 1975) is an American actor and former professional American football player best known for playing the running back Wendell Brown in the 1999 teen sport film Varsity Blues. He was nationally ranked as a high school football player at Montclair Prep and then played his college football at Stanford University. He signed on as an undrafted free agent to play with the Kansas City Chiefs, but his playing days were cut short by injury and he moved back to California to do production assistant work.
