= Get Inside =

Single by Stone Sour

from the album Stone Sour
- Released: July 2002
- Genre: Nu metal
- Length: 3:13
- Label: Roadrunner
- Songwriters: Shawn Economaki; Joel Ekman; Josh Rand; Corey Taylor
- Producers: Stone Sour; Tom Tatman

Stone Sour singles chronology
"Get Inside" (2002)	"Bother" (2002)

"Get Inside" is a song by Stone Sour, and the first music video the band released. It came out in 2002 for the band's eponymous album, almost a decade after the band was first created.

It is notable that this is one of the few occasions where guitarist Josh Rand plays lead guitar, instead of his usual position as rhythm guitarist.

It was nominated for Best Metal Performance at the 45th Grammy Awards.

== Music video ==
The music video shows the band performing in front of an audience at a club. It is shown to be in black and white. It has been presumed that the white light highlights the contrast between the darker lyrics of the song.

== Track listing ==
CD single
No.	Title	Length
1.	"Get Inside"	3:13
2.	"Get Inside" (rough mix)	3:15

Promo CD single US
No.	Title	Length
1.	"Get Inside"	3:13
2.	"Blotter"	3:30
3.	"Orchids"	4:23

Promo CD single US #2
No.	Title	Length
1.	"Get Inside" (Clean Edit)	3:13

== Personnel ==
Credits adapted from Stone Sour album liner notes.

- Corey Taylor − vocals
- James Root − lead guitar
- Josh Rand − rhythm guitar
- Shawn Economaki − bass
- Joel Ekman − drums

== Live in Moscow ==
1. "Get Inside" (live) – 4:12

== Awards and honors ==
"Get Inside" was nominated for the Grammy Award for Best Metal Performance at the 45th Annual Grammy Awards, but lost to "Here to Stay" by Korn.
