= Paul Durham =

American singer-songwriter (born 1968)

- Born: Paul Durham; September 9, 1968 (age 57)
- Origin: Twin Falls, Idaho, United States
- Genres: Alternative rock; rock
- Occupations: Singer, songwriter, musician
- Instruments: Vocals; guitar
- Years active: 1995–present
- Labels: Geffen; Epic; Independent
- Website: pauldurham.com blacklabworld.com

Paul Durham (born September 9, 1968) is an American musician and producer, a solo singer-songwriter and the lead singer of rock bands Black Lab, Stray Palace, and Cake or Death.

He is the writer of two Billboard charting songs, "Wash it Away" and "Time Ago" from Black Lab's Geffen Records debut, Your Body Above Me, and is represented by EMI Music Publishing and Secret Road Music.

== Discography ==
=== Albums ===
- 1997: Your Body Above Me
- 2003: I Feel Fine
- 2004: Ten Million Years - Songs from the Nineteen Nineties
- 2005: See the Sun
- 2006: Cake or Death
- 2006: Your Body Above Me - The Directors Cut
- 2007: Passion Leaves a Trace
- 2007: Technologie
- 2008: Mirror Ball Associates: Covers, Vol. 1
- 2009: Stray Palace EP
- 2010: Two Strangers
- 2011: Stray Palace - The Diamond EP
- 2012: Best of the MP3 of the Month Club
- 2014: A Raven has my Heart
- 2015: Live Acoustic from the Mercury Lounge
- 2016: A New World
- 2023: This Sweet Life
- 2024: Dark Star (Black Lab B-Sides)

=== Soundtracks and licenses ===
- Spider-Man: "Learn to Crawl"
- House (Season 07 Episode 16): "This Night"
- Pretty Little Liars: "Say Goodbye"
- Blade: Trinity: "This Blood"
- Buffy the Vampire Slayer: "Keep Myself Awake"
- Can't Hardly Wait: "Tell Me What to Say"
- The Covenant: "River of Joy" (trailer)
- Lovewrecked: "Broken Heart", "Weightless", "Perfect Girl" and "Lonely Boy"
- Permanent Midnight: "Horses"
- The Shield: "This Night" (Season 6 promo)
- Varsity Blues: "Black Eye"
- The Benchwarmers: "Good"
- Waiting for Forever: "Mine Again" (trailer)
- Numb3rs: "Good"
- Six Degrees: "Rise"
- Flashpoint: "Weightless"

=== Compilation appearances ===
- "Your Ghost" on Hot Hands: A Tribute to Throwing Muses & Kristin Hersh (Kuma-chan Records, 2003)

== See also ==
- Black Lab
