= Passion Leaves a Trace =

- Original uncensored version cover

Studio album by Black Lab
- Released: January 16, 2007
- Genre: Alternative rock, trip hop
- Length: 50:46
- Label: Blacklabworld.com
- Producer: Michael Belfer; Paul Durham; Andy Ellis; Marti Frederiksen; Brian Paturalski

Black Lab chronology
See the Sun (2005)	Passion Leaves a Trace (2007)	Technologie (2007)

Passion Leaves a Trace is the third LP by American alternative rock band Black Lab. The album featured the track "Mine Again," which, as part of the "Bum Rush the Charts" program peaked at #11 on the U.S. rock chart. The campaign had a significant international impact, selling songs in every country in which iTunes has stores and pushing "Mine Again" to #53 on the Canadian chart (#10 rock), #15 in the Netherlands (#2 rock) and #73 in Germany (#12 rock), among others.

Tracks from Passion Leaves a Trace have been used on several Canadian and US TV programs: Durham County used "Weightless", "The Window" and "This Night"; Flashpoint and Banshee used "Weightless"; and Killjoys used "This Night".

== Track listing ==
No.	Title	Writer(s)	Length
1.	"Mine Again"	Paul Durham; Marti Frederiksen	4:20
2.	"Ghost in Your Mind"	Durham	3:43
3.	"The Real You"	Durham; Andy Ellis	4:06
4.	"This Night"	Durham	3:29
5.	"Gone"	Durham; A. Ellis	3:34
6.	"A Day Alone"	Durham	3:43
7.	"Weightless"	Durham; Paul Ellis	5:37
8.	"Pictures of People"	Michael Belfer; Durham	4:23
9.	"Broken Heart"	Durham	3:18
10.	"Sun and Moon"	Durham	3:02
11.	"Good"	Durham; Brian Paturalski	3:19
12.	"The Window"	Durham; Paturalski	4:30
13.	"Your Ghost" (bonus track)	Kristin Hersh	3:42
Total length:			50:46

== Personnel ==
Credits adapted from AllMusic.

- Michael Belfer – background vocals, bass, guitar, producer
- Isaac Carpenter – drums
- Matt Chamberlain – drums
- Mark Comstock – bass
- Paul Durham – acoustic guitar, bass, electric guitar, guitar, keyboards, layout design, organ, percussion, producer, programming, synthesizer, vocals
- Andy Ellis – bass, keyboards, mixing, producer, programming, synthesizer, vocals, wah-wah guitar
- Marti Frederiksen – background vocals, bass, guitar, keyboards, producer, programming
- Rick Pier O'Neil – mastering
- Brian Paturalski – bass, guitar, keyboards, mixing, producer, programming
