= Varsity Blues (film) =

1999 film by Brian Robbins

- Theatrical release poster
- Directed by: Brian Robbins
- Written by: W. Peter Iliff
- Produced by: Brian Robbins; Michael Tollin; Tova Laiter
- Starring: James Van Der Beek; Jon Voight; Paul Walker; Ron Lester; Scott Caan
- Cinematography: Chuck Cohen
- Edited by: Ned Bastille
- Music by: Mark Isham
- Production companies: MTV Productions; Tollin/Robbins Productions
- Distributed by: Paramount Pictures
- Release date: January 15, 1999 (United States)
- Running time: 106 minutes
- Country: United States
- Language: English
- Budget: $16 million
- Box office: $54.3 million

Varsity Blues is a 1999 American coming-of-age sports comedy-drama film directed by Brian Robbins and written by W. Peter Iliff. It stars James Van Der Beek, Jon Voight, Paul Walker, Ron Lester, and Scott Caan. In the film, a small-town high school football team deals with the pressures of adolescence, their football-obsessed community, and their authoritarian coach.

Varsity Blues was theatrically released in the United States on January 15, 1999, by Paramount Pictures. The film grossed $54.3 million worldwide against a $16 million budget but received mixed reviews from critics, with praise for its depiction of small-town communities and criticism for its cliches. Varsity Blues has since gone on to become a cult film, inspiring other coming-of-age films and the codename for a 2019 criminal investigation into U.S. college admissions.

== Plot ==
In the fictional small town of West Canaan, Texas, Jonathan "Mox" Moxon is an academically gifted backup quarterback for the 3A high school Varsity football team, the West Canaan Coyotes. Despite his relative popularity at school, easy friendships with other players, and a relationship with girlfriend Jules Harbor, Mox is dissatisfied with his life. Wanting to leave Texas and attend Brown University, he constantly clashes with his football-obsessed father, Sam. He dreads playing under legendary coach Bud Kilmer, a verbally abusive and domineering authoritarian who believes in winning at all costs.

Kilmer's philosophy finally takes its toll when he pushes the Coyotes' star quarterback, Lance Harbor, Mox's best friend and Jules' older brother, into taking painkilling shots into an injured knee. This leads to Lance injuring the knee further during a game, partly because Kilmer had forced offensive lineman Billy Bob to continue playing despite a concussion. At the hospital, the doctors, appalled at the massive amount of scar tissue found under his knee, explain that recovery will take at least a year and a half, costing Lance his football scholarship to Florida State.

Mox, who has accompanied Lance, is shocked when Kilmer denies his role in Lance's injury, even though he ordered the trainer to provide the painkillers. Needing a new quarterback, Kilmer reluctantly names Mox to replace Lance as team captain and starting quarterback, which brings unexpected dividends for Mox. Wanting to marry someone leaving West Canaan to escape small-town life, Darcy Sears, Lance's cheerleader girlfriend, shows sexual interest in Mox and even attempts to seduce him with a whipped cream "bikini" over her otherwise naked body, but he gently rebuffs her, telling her that she can independently escape West Canaan.

Disgusted with Kilmer and not strongly needing to win, Mox starts calling his own plays on the field without Kilmer's approval and also organizes an all night drinking party with his close friends on the team at a local strip club the night before a game. Fed up with the pressure from Sam, Mox chides him. Sam had been a football player at West Canaan, and although Kilmer dismissed him for lacking talent and courage, Sam still respected and obeyed him. When Kilmer discovers that Mox has won a full academic scholarship to Brown, he threatens to alter Mox's transcripts to endanger his scholarship unless he falls in line.

Kilmer's disregard for the players continues, leading to Billy Bob's dramatic mental collapse. When star running back Wendell Brown, another friend of Mox's, is injured in the district title game, Kilmer persuades him to take a shot of cortisone to deaden the pain in his knee, allowing Wendell to continue at risk of more serious, and perhaps even permanent, injury. Desperate to be recruited by a good college, Wendell almost consents when Mox intervenes and tells Kilmer he will quit if the procedure continues. Undaunted, Kilmer orders wide receiver Charlie Tweeder, a friend of both Mox and Wendell, to replace Mox, but Tweeder refuses. Mox tells Kilmer that the team will only return to the field without him.

Realizing that he will be forced to forfeit the game, an angered Kilmer physically assaults Mox, but the other players intercede and then refuse to take to the field. Knowing his outburst has cost him his credibility, Kilmer tries unsuccessfully to rally support and spark the team's trust in him, but none of the players follow him out of the locker room. Kilmer retreats alone to his office in defeat, abandoning the team to their fate. Using a five-receiver offense in the second half, the Coyotes proceed to win the game and the district championship without Kilmer's guidance, owing to Lance calling the plays from the sideline, and Billy Bob scoring the game-winning touchdown on a hook-and-ladder play.

In a voice-over epilogue, Mox recounts several characters' aftermaths: Kilmer left town and never coached again, but his statue remained due to its weight; after the game, Tweeder drank beer and Billy Bob cried in celebration; Lance became a successful football coach, Wendell received a football scholarship to Grambling State University, and Mox went on to attend Brown on an academic scholarship.

== Cast ==
- James Van Der Beek as Jonathan "Mox" Moxon, an academically successful, yet rebellious backup quarterback
- Jon Voight as Coach Bud Kilmer, the Coyotes' abusive tyrannical 30-year head coach
- Paul Walker as Lance Harbor, the original captain and starting quarterback of the Coyotes and Mox's best friend
- Ron Lester as Billy Bob, an overweight but powerful offensive guard
- Richard Lineback as Joe Harbor, Lance and Julie's obnoxious, football-obsessed father
- Scott Caan as Charlie Tweeder, a wild, cocky and hard-partying wide receiver
- Amy Smart as Julie Harbor, Lance's younger sister and Mox's girlfriend
- Thomas F. Duffy as Sam Moxon, Mox's football-obsessed father
- Ali Larter as Darcy Sears, Lance's girlfriend, captain of the cheerleading squad
- Joe Pichler as Kyle Moxon, Mox's younger brother who is into religions rather than football, stemming from an injury from football
- Eliel Swinton as Wendell Brown, the star running back
- Jill Parker Jones as Maureen "Mo" Moxon, Mox's mother
- Tiffany C. Love as Collette Harbor, Lance and Julie's mother
- Jesse Plemons as Tommy Harbor, Lance and Julie's younger brother and Kyle's best friend
- Tonie Perensky as Miss Davis, the Health teacher at West Canaan High School who moonlights as a stripper at the local strip club The Landing Strip

== Reception ==
Varsity Blues opened at #1 at the North American box office making US$17.5 million in its opening weekend. Though it had a 39.6% decline in earnings, it was still enough to keep it at the top spot for another week.

On Rotten Tomatoes, the film has a 47% approval rating based on reviews from 58 critics. The site's consensus states, "This is a predictable football movie that lacks intensity." On Metacritic, it has a score of 50 out of 100 based on reviews from 20 critics, indicating "mixed or average reviews". Audiences polled by CinemaScore gave the film an average rating of "B+" on an A+ to F scale.

Roger Ebert noted in his Chicago Sun-Times review that, "Scenes work, but they don't pile up and build momentum." ReelViews online film critic James Berardinelli's summary was that although it "takes a worthwhile detour or two, it ultimately finds its way back to the well-worn track of its genre." Owen Gleiberman of Entertainment Weekly also gave a positive review, remarking that while the film "has its shallow gags and cliché characters…it also creates a vivid portrait of a small-town community in the grip of an obsession".

== Soundtrack ==
Varsity Blues: Music From And Inspired By The Motion Picture

Soundtrack album by various artists
- Released: January 12, 1999
- Genres: Heavy metal, post-grunge, alternative rock, pop rock
- Label: Hollywood Records

Professional ratings
Review scores
Source	Rating
AllMusic	2.5/5 stars

Hollywood Records released the soundtrack on January 12, 1999.

No.	Title	Writer(s)	Producer(s)	Length
1.	"Fly" (Loudmouth)	Bob Fedderson; John Sullivan	Johnny K; John Sullivan	4:03
2.	"Nice Guys Finish Last" (Green Day)	Billie Joe Armstrong; Frank Wright; Michael Pritchard	Rob Cavallo; Green Day	2:50
3.	"My Hero" (Foo Fighters)	David Grohl; Nate Mendel; Pat Smear	Gil Norton	4:22
4.	"Run" (Collective Soul)	Ed Roland	Ed Roland	4:17
5.	"Are You Ready for the Fallout?" (Fastball)	Tony Scalzo	Jerry Finn	3:18
6.	"Horror Show" (Third Eye Blind)	Kevin Cadogan; Stephan Jenkins	Stephan Jenkins	4:01
7.	"Every Little Thing Counts" (Janus Stark)	Graham Butt; Andrew Pinching	Terry Thomas	4:06
8.	"Hot for Teacher" (Van Halen)	Edward Van Halen; Alex Van Halen; Michael Anthony; David Lee Roth	Ted Templeman	4:44
9.	"Ship Jumper" (Simon Says)	Simon Says	Rob Cavallo; Mark Needham	3:44
10.	"Kick Out The Jams" (Monster Magnet)	Frederick D. Smith; Wayne Kramer; Dennis Tomich; Robert Derminer; Michael Davis	Dave Wyndorf; Matt Hyde	2:36
11.	"Black Eye" (Black Lab)	Paul Durham	Jacquire King	4:30
12.	"Two Faces" (Days of the New)	Travis Meeks	Scott Litt	3:41
13.	"Thunderstruck" (Sprung Monkey)	Angus Young; Malcolm Young	Dave Kaplan; Gary Hoey (assoc.)	6:05
14.	"Teen Competition" (Redd Kross)	Jeff McDonald; Steven McDonald; Bill Bartell; Brian Reitzell	Redd Kross; Chris Shaw	2:29
15.	"Varsity Blue" (Caroline's Spine)	Jim Newquist	Jim Newquist	3:00

== Awards ==
1999 Teen Choice Awards

- Choice Movie Breakout: James Van Der Beek (won)
- Choice Drama Movie (nominated)

1999 MTV Movie Awards

- Best Breakout Performance: James Van Der Beek (won)
- Best Movie Song (nominated)

2000 Blockbuster Entertainment Awards

- Best Male Newcomer: James Van Der Beek (nominated)

== Other media ==
The film was later parodied in the 2001 film Not Another Teen Movie. Ron Lester reprised his role of Billy Bob by playing a nearly identical character named Reggie Ray, while Ali Larter's whipped cream bikini scene was parodied. Larter liked the "shock value" of the scene which was her first during the film's production in her first movie role. The film was also quoted in the 2004 film Mean Girls as being Regina George's favorite movie.

In January 2002, Nelvana and MTV announced that they would co-produce a television series based on the film. Screenwriter Peter Iliff and producer Tova Leiter signed on to produce the series. The cast included Sean Dwyer as Stick and Charlie Talbert as Billy Bob, but the project was ultimately scrapped.

The ring name of professional wrestler Jon Moxley stems from mishearing the name of the film's protagonist, Jonathan Moxon, with both also going by the nickname "Mox". Moxley said in February 2020, "I'd probably been thinking about names for years and years, but I had no ideas. So, right before I'm about to go out [for my debut match] the ring announcer said, 'What's the name?' I didn't have one. This other wrestler guy was just like, 'It's like the Varsity Blues guy. He's like the guy from Varsity Blues. Jonathan Moxley.' They're like, 'That's cool.' I was too nervous to say yes or no. Actually, in the movie, it's Moxon. So the guy screwed up the name a little bit."

In December 2024, Van Der Beek announced the sale of autographed jerseys to support his colorectal cancer treatments while celebrating the twenty-fifth anniversary of the film's release.

== See also ==
- List of American football films
