= Can't Hardly Wait =

- Theatrical release poster
- Directed by: Deborah Kaplan; Harry Elfont
- Written by: Deborah Kaplan; Harry Elfont
- Produced by: Jenno Topping; Betty Thomas
- Starring: Ethan Embry; Charlie Korsmo; Lauren Ambrose; Peter Facinelli; Seth Green; Jennifer Love Hewitt
- Cinematography: Lloyd Ahern
- Edited by: Michael Jablow
- Music by: David Kitay; Matthew Sweet
- Production companies: Columbia Pictures; Tall Trees Productions
- Distributed by: Sony Pictures Releasing
- Release date: June 12, 1998
- Running time: 101 minutes
- Country: United States
- Language: English
- Budget: $10–13 million
- Box office: $25.6 million

Can't Hardly Wait is a 1998 American teen romantic comedy film written and directed by Deborah Kaplan and Harry Elfont. It stars an ensemble cast including Ethan Embry, Charlie Korsmo, Lauren Ambrose, Peter Facinelli, Seth Green, and Jennifer Love Hewitt, and contains a number of "before-they-were-famous" appearances by teen stars. The story takes place at a high school graduation party.

The film received mixed reviews from critics. It grossed a total of $25 million at the North American domestic box office, against a production budget of $10 million. The soundtrack peaked at number 25 on the Billboard 200 chart.

== Plot ==
In 1998, the senior class of suburban high school Huntington Hillside High are attending a graduation party at the house of a rich class member. Among them is Preston Meyers, an outsider who plans to proclaim his secret four-year-long love to Amanda Beckett.

Amanda, the most popular girl in school and the senior class prom queen, has been dumped by popular jock Mike Dexter. His classmate William Lichter targets him, plotting revenge against Mike for years of bullying. Kenny Fisher is a wannabe thug who plans on losing his virginity by the end of the night.

Amanda is consoled by her popular girlfriends, but realizes she has nothing in common with them. She tries to figure out if she has an identity beyond only being known as "Mike Dexter's girlfriend".

Amanda discovers a letter addressed to her by Preston and, moved by its contents, makes it her mission to find him, though she does not know what he looks like and no one she asks gives any helpful descriptions. Meanwhile, Preston's antisocial best friend Denise Fleming and Kenny accidentally lock themselves inside a bathroom away from the party, where they talk about their old friendship and how they had drifted apart. Their conversation leads to the restoration of their friendship and escalates into them having sex.

A graduate from Mike's high school, Trip McNeely, tells him that guys like them are "a dime a dozen" in college. Trip emphasizes how he dumped his girlfriend in the same fashion that Mike did to "score" with other women and was unsuccessful. Terrified of this prospect, Mike tries to get Amanda back, but she is happier without him and humiliates him in front of everyone there.

After seeing the school jock turned down, multiple guys begin to hit on Amanda, much to her disgust. Preston finds her and professes his love, but as she still has not learned what he looks like, she assumes he is another pervert and rejects him in front of the entire party. Amanda later realizes her mistake when she sees Preston's yearbook picture and tries to find him, but he has already driven home in disappointment.

Meanwhile, William devises his plan to get revenge on Mike and goes into the party to drive him out. While there, William begins drinking alcohol to fit in, drinking enough to make him forget why he was there. An impromptu sing-along to Guns N' Roses' "Paradise City" causes him to become popular, with multiple women trying to have sex with him.

William later begins talking with Mike, who apologizes for bullying him. After William forgives him, the two bond and seemingly become friends. When both are jailed as a result of a police bust, Mike takes the blame.

The next morning, when William sees Mike and his friends at a diner, he tries to thank him for taking the fall. However, Mike acts as though he remembers nothing that happened the previous night, and again ridicules him in front of his friends.

Meanwhile, Preston is at a train station about to leave for Boston when Amanda arrives and asks him about the letter. He confesses he wrote it and is about to depart for a writing workshop with Kurt Vonnegut. The two say goodbye and Preston walks away, but then stops and runs back to Amanda before the two kiss.

The epilogue explains what happens to all of the main characters:

- William becomes one of the most popular students at Harvard. He forms a computer company that makes him worth millions, and starts dating a supermodel.
- Mike goes to college but, after drinking too much, loses his football scholarship. He ends up forty pounds overweight and working at a car wash, a job he loses when incriminating Polaroids surface.
- The day after the party, Denise and Kenny go to a diner, where she dumps him five minutes later. Ten minutes pass before they find a bathroom and get back together.
- Seven hours later, Preston boards a train to Boston. Amanda writes him a letter for every day that he is away. They still remain together.

In a mid-credits scene, William's two friends are beamed up by a flying saucer.

== Cast ==
- Ethan Embry as Preston Meyers
- Jennifer Love Hewitt as Amanda Beckett
- Lauren Ambrose as Denise Fleming
- Peter Facinelli as Mike Dexter
- Seth Green as Kenny Fisher
- Charlie Korsmo as William Lichter
- Robert Jayne as Richie Coolboy
- Michelle Brookhurst as Molly Stinson, party host
- Joel Michaely as Geoff Piccirilli, X-File #1
- Jay Paulson as Murphy Pelan, X-File #2
- Chris Owen as the Klepto Kid
- Jason Segel as Matt, Watermelon Guy
- Clea Duvall as Jana
- Jaime Pressly as Beth, Girlfriend #1
- Tamala Jones as Cindi, Girlfriend #2
- Jennifer Lyons as Rachel, Girlfriend #3
- Channon Roe as Jake, Jock #1
- Sean Patrick Thomas as Ben, Jock #2
- Freddy Rodriguez as T.J., Jock #3
- Erik Palladino as Cousin Ron
- Melissa Joan Hart as Vicki, Yearbook Girl (uncredited)
- Donald Faison as Dan, Love Burger drummer
- Breckin Meyer as Love Burger singer (uncredited)
- Paige Moss as Ashley
- Eric Balfour as Steve, Hippie Guy
- Selma Blair and Jennifer Paz as the Girls Mike Hits On
- Jenna Elfman as The Angel (uncredited)
- Sara Rue as Earth Girl
- Nicole Bilderback as Ready to Have Sex Girl
- Leslie Grossman as Ready to Have Sex's Friend
- Marisol Nichols as Groupie #2
- Vicellous Shannon as Carl, Reddi-wip Kid
- Jerry O'Connell as Trip McNeely (uncredited)

== Concept ==
The story takes place at a high school graduation party in the late 1990s and in a style much like that of the high school movies of the 1980s. The idea of setting most of the movie at a party was based primarily on concerns to keep production costs low and was also inspired by the movies of John Hughes and the party scene in Say Anything....

The film takes its name from The Replacements' song of the same title, from their 1987 album Pleased to Meet Me, which plays over the film's closing credits.

== Production ==
The script for Can't Hardly Wait was originally written in 1996, by Harry Elfont and Deborah Kaplan who were looking for a project they could develop and direct themselves on a limited budget. The project was approved by Columbia Pictures in mid-1997, following the success of teen-oriented horror film Scream in early 1997. Principal photography for Can't Hardly Wait started in October 1997, and ran for 26 days. Jennifer Love Hewitt was known for Party of Five when she signed on to the film, and appeared in the slasher hit I Know What You Did Last Summer, which helped to further raise her profile. According to Charlie Korsmo, Adam Hann-Byrd was originally cast as William Lichter.

The cast had a week of rehearsals before filming.

The film initially received an R-Rating due to MPAA objections about the depiction of teens drinking alcohol at an unsupervised party and drug use. The film was recut to receive a PG-13 rating.

== Reception ==
=== Box office ===
Can't Hardly Wait was released on June 12, 1998, and grossed $8,025,910 in its opening weekend. Its total domestic gross was $25,605,015, more than double its production budget.

=== Critical response ===
On Rotten Tomatoes, the film holds an approval rating of 42% based on 65 reviews, with an average rating of 5.1/10. The site's consensus reads, "Occasionally clever and moderately intelligent, Can't Hardly Wait also contains too many cheap laughs, recycled plotting, and flat characters." On Metacritic, the film has a weighted average score of 52 out of 100, based on 17 critics, indicating "mixed or average" reviews. Audiences surveyed by CinemaScore gave the film a grade "B+" on scale of A to F.

Kevin Thomas of the Los Angeles Times wrote: "For all its nonstop energy and high spirits, Can't Hardly Wait allows its characters to emerge as fully dimensional individuals; they've been written with care and perception and played with equal aplomb by a roster of talented young actors". Mick LaSalle of the San Francisco Chronicle wrote: "Can't Hardly Wait has freshness, comic invention and an engaging romantic spirit." Stephen Thompson of The A.V. Club wrote: "But the film deserves credit, both for its breezy pacing and its uncommon tendency to make its characters smarter and geekier than they might have been."

Emanuel Levy of Variety called the film a "mediocre attempt to recapture the exuberance and candid portraiture of such high school movie classics as American Graffiti, Fast Times at Ridgemont High and Dazed and Confused." Levy praised the cast but was critical of the "uneven script and rough direction". Roger Ebert of the Chicago Sun-Times gave the film 1.5 stars out of 4, and wrote: "The kind of movie that somehow succeeds in moving very, very slowly even while proceeding at a breakneck pace. It cuts quickly back and forth between nothing and nothing... It doesn't have the zing of life and subversion that the best high school movies always have."

=== Awards ===
In 2012, Entertainment Weekly ranked Can't Hardly Wait number 44 on its list of the 50 Best High School Movies of all time.

- MTV Movie Awards
  - Best Female Performance: (Jennifer Love Hewitt) Nominated
- Young Artist Awards
  - Best Performance in a Feature Film — Leading Young Actress: (Jennifer Love Hewitt) Nominated

== Sequel ==
On May 25, 2019, on Danny Pellegrino's Everything Iconic podcast, Jennifer Love Hewitt revealed that she is developing Can't Hardly Wait 2 with plans to direct it herself. The concept revolves around the reunion of the original high school gang from the 1998 film.

== Home media ==
The film was released on VHS and DVD on November 17, 1998. On September 30, 2008, it was re-released on DVD and Blu-ray as the "10 Year Reunion Edition" to commemorate the film's 10th anniversary. The re-release included bonus features not on the original release. Mill Creek Entertainment reissued the DVD and Blu-ray on June 17, 2014, and October 30, 2018, respectively with the latter format billed as the "20 Year Reunion Edition". The film was released on 4k UHD Blu-ray on August 20, 2024, by Sony Pictures.

== Music ==
=== Soundtrack ===
Can't Hardly Wait: Music From The Motion Picture

Soundtrack album by Various Artists
- Released: May 26, 1998
- Recorded: 1997–98
- Genre: Soundtrack
- Length: 59:00
- Label: Elektra
- Producer: Various Artists

Singles from Can't Hardly Wait: Music From The Motion Picture
- 1. "Hit Em wit da Hee" Released: April 3, 1998; 2. "Turn It Up (Remix) / Fire It Up" Released: May 15, 1998; 3. "Can't Get Enough of You Baby" Released: June 12, 1998

Can't Hardly Wait: Music From The Motion Picture is the soundtrack of the film which was released on May 26, 1998, by Elektra Records. It peaked at number 25 on the Billboard 200 chart.

Professional ratings
Review scores
Source	Rating
AllMusic	3/5 stars

No.	Title	Writer(s)	Producer(s)	Length
1.	"Graduate" (Remix) (Third Eye Blind)	Stephan Jenkins; Kevin Cadogan	Stephan Jenkins; Eric Valentine (co.)	3:07
2.	"Can't Get Enough of You Baby" (Smash Mouth)	Sandy Linzer; Denny Randell	Eric Valentine	2:31
3.	"Dammit" (Blink-182)	Scott Raynor; Mark Hoppus; Tom DeLonge	Mark Trombino	2:46
4.	"I Walked In" (Brougham)	Jason Slater; Luke Oakson	Jason Slater	4:19
5.	"Turn It Up (Remix) / Fire It Up" (Busta Rhymes)	Trevor Smith	Busta Rhymes; Spliff Star (co.)	3:44
6.	"Hit Em Wit Da Hee" (Remix) (Missy "Misdemeanor" Elliott featuring Lil' Kim and Mocha)	Melissa "Missy" Elliott; Tim Mosley; Kimberly Jones; Alicia Richards	Timbaland	4:50
7.	"Swing My Way" (Remix) (K.P. & Envyi)	Michael O. Johnson; Javalyn Johnson; Carlton Mahone, Jr.; Chris Bridges	Mixzo; Carl Mo (add.)	4:08
8.	"Flash Light" (Parliament)	Bootsy Collins; George Clinton, Jr.; Bernard Worrell	George Clinton	4:27
9.	"It's Tricky" (Run-D.M.C.)	Joseph Simmons; Darryl McDaniels; Jason Mizell; Rick Rubin	Russell Simmons; Rick Rubin	3:02
10.	"High" (Feeder)	Grant Nicholas	Grant Nicholas; Feeder	4:34
11.	"Tell Me What to Say" (Black Lab)	Paul Durham	Ralph Sall	4:06
12.	"Farther Down" (Matthew Sweet)	Matthew Sweet	Ralph Sall	3:48
13.	"Can't Hardly Wait" (The Replacements)	Paul Westerberg	Jim Dickinson	3:03
14.	"Umbrella" (Dog's Eye View)	Peter Stuart	Matt Wallace	3:34
15.	"Paradise City" (Guns N' Roses)	Guns N' Roses	Mike Clink	6:45
Total length:				59:00

=== Featured music ===
Other music featured in the movie but not on the soundtrack includes:

1. "London" – Third Eye Blind
2. "Mandy" – Barry Manilow
3. "Caress Me Down" – Sublime
4. "Romeo and Juliet" – Dire Straits
5. "6 Underground (The Umbrellas of Ladywell Mix # 2)" – Sneaker Pimps
6. "Open Road Song" – Eve 6
7. "I'll Make Love to You" – Boyz II Men
8. "Wooly Imbibe" – Soul Coughing
9. "Walkin' on the Sun" – Smash Mouth
10. "Cold Beverage" – G. Love & Special Sauce
11. "Ode" – Creed
12. "How Do I Make You" – Jennifer Love Hewitt
13. "Don't Leave Me This Way" – Thelma Houston
14. "All Mixed Up" – 311
15. "More Human than Human" – White Zombie
16. "Inside Out" – Eve 6
17. "Get It On" – Kingdom Come
18. "Bust a Move" – Young MC
19. "Groove Is in the Heart" (The Deee-Remix) – Deee-Lite
20. "The Mac" – Dr. Freeze
21. "Funky Cold Medina" – Tone Lōc
22. "Ghost Radio" – Brian Setzer Orchestra
23. "Lucas with the Lid Off" – Lucas
24. "Love Hurts" – Nazareth
25. "Waiting for a Girl Like You" – Foreigner
26. "Sugar Cane" – Space Monkeys
27. "Funk #49" – James Gang
28. "When Will I See You Again" – The Three Degrees
29. "Only You" – Yazoo

=== Certifications ===
Region	Certification	Certified units/sales
United States (RIAA)	Gold	500,000^{^}
^{^} Shipments figures based on certification alone.
