= Your Body Above Me =

Studio album by Black Lab
- Released: October 21, 1997
- Genre: Alternative rock; post-grunge; gothic rock
- Length: 51:42 (original); 59:34 (re-release)
- Label: Geffen Records; Blacklabworld.com
- Producer: David Bianco; Black Lab

Black Lab chronology
Your Body Above Me (1997)	I Feel Fine (2003)

Singles from Your Body Above Me
- 1. "Wash It Away" Released: 1997; 2. "Time Ago" Released: 1998

Professional ratings
Review scores
Source	Rating
Allmusic	3/5 stars
Pitchfork	1.8/10

Your Body Above Me is the debut album by the alternative rock band Black Lab. Released on Geffen Records on October 21, 1997, it featured two US radio hits, "Wash it Away" and "Time Ago." The album was also simultaneously released as a three-sided vinyl LP with a press of the album artwork on the fourth side. It was released outside of America in January 1998.

The band split with Geffen in 1999, and in October 2006, lead singer Paul Durham announced that the album would be re-released as Your Body Above Me: The Director's Cut, with an alternate track listing and two bonus tracks, as well as two minutes of additional music cut from the original tracks.

== Original track listing ==
No.	Title	Writer(s)	Length
1.	"Wash it Away"	Paul Durham	4:14
2.	"She Loves Me"	Paul Durham	4:33
3.	"X-Ray"	Paul Durham	3:26
4.	"Time Ago"	Paul Durham	4:15
5.	"Can't Keep the Rain"	Paul Durham	4:15
6.	"Thin White Lie"	Paul Durham	4:38
7.	"Anything"	Paul Durham	5:41
8.	"Ten Million Years"	Paul Durham	4:14
9.	"All the Money in the World"	Paul Durham; PJ Harvey	4:11
10.	"Sleeps With Angels"	Paul Durham	4:04
11.	"Bring it On"	Paul Durham	3:50
12.	"Gates of the Country"	Paul Durham	4:27
Total length:			51:42

== Re-release track listing ==
No.	Title	Writer(s)	Length
1.	"Wash it Away"	Paul Durham	4:14
2.	"Can't Keep the Rain"	Paul Durham	4:15
3.	"Time Ago"	Paul Durham	4:15
4.	"Walk Slow"	Paul Durham	4:02
5.	"X-Ray"	Paul Durham	3:26
6.	"Ten Million Years"	Paul Durham	4:14
7.	"Anything"	Paul Durham	5:41
8.	"James"	Paul Durham	3:43
9.	"She Loves Me"	Paul Durham	4:33
10.	"Bring it On"	Paul Durham	3:50
11.	"Sleeps With Angels"	Paul Durham	4:04
12.	"Thin White Lie"	Paul Durham	4:38
13.	"The Big Machine"	Paul Durham; PJ Harvey	4:11
14.	"Gates of the Country"	Paul Durham	4:27
Total length:			59:34
