= Spider-Man (soundtrack) =

Spider-Man: Music from and Inspired by

Soundtrack album by various artists
- Released: April 30, 2002
- Recorded: 1967 (theme from Spider-Man), 1999–2002
- Genres: Alternative rock; hard rock; post-grunge
- Length: 65:00
- Labels: Columbia; Roadrunner; Island Def Jam; Sony Music Soundtrax
- Producers: Butch Walker; Will Botwin; Jonas Nachsin; Lyor Cohen; Julie Greenwald; Spring Aspers; Glen Brunman; Denise Luiso; Lia Vollack

Singles from Spider-Man: Music from and Inspired by
- 1. "Hero" Released: March 1, 2002; 2. "It's What We're All About" Released: April 17, 2002; 3. "Bother" Released: March 3, 2003

Professional ratings
Review scores
Source	Rating
AllMusic	1.5/5 stars
Filmtracks	4/5 stars

Spider-Man: Music from and Inspired by is a 2002 soundtrack album for the film Spider-Man. Although it contains a portion of the film score by Danny Elfman, a more complete album of Elfman's work was released as Spider-Man: Original Motion Picture Score.

== Track listing ==
Credits adapted from the album's liner notes.

No.	Title	Writer(s)	Producer(s)	Length
1.	"Theme from Spider-Man" (Classic TV Series Theme Song)	J. Robert Harris; Paul Francis Webster		1:01
2.	"Hero" (Chad Kroeger featuring Josey Scott)	Chad Kroeger	Chad Kroeger	3:20
3.	"What We're All About (The Original Version)" (Sum 41 featuring Kerry King from Slayer)	Sum 41	Greig Nori; Deryck Whibley; Rick Rubin (add.)	3:35
4.	"Learn to Crawl" (Black Lab)	Paul Durham; Andy Ellis	Tom Lord-Alge; Paul Durham; Andy Ellis (co.)	3:36
5.	"Somebody Else" (Bleu)	Bleu; Peter Moore	John Fields; Bleu	3:38
6.	"Bug Bytes" (Alien Ant Farm)	Alien Ant Farm	James Murray; Alien Ant Farm	3:32
7.	"Blind" (Default)	Jeremy James Hora; Chad Kroeger; Default	Chad Kroeger	3:11
8.	"Bother" (Corey Taylor)	Corey Taylor	James "Jimbo" Barton; Corey Taylor	4:00
9.	"Shelter" (Greenwheel)	Greenwheel	Malcolm Springer	3:32
10.	"When It Started" (The Strokes)	Julian Casablancas	Gordon Raphael	2:56
11.	"Hate to Say I Told You So" (The Hives)	Randy Fitzsimmons	Pelle Gunderfelt	3:22
12.	"Invisible Man" (Theory of a Deadman)	Tyler Connolly; Chad Kroeger	Chad Kroeger; Joey Moi	2:40
13.	"Undercover" (Pete Yorn)	Pete Yorn	Ken Andrews	3:59
14.	"My Nutmeg Phantasy (Morello Mix)" (Macy Gray featuring Angie Stone and Mos Def)	Macy Gray; Lonnie Marshall; Keith Ciancia; Tom Ralls; Finn Hammer; Darryl Swann	Darryl Swann; Macy Gray	4:29
15.	"I - IV - V" (Injected)	Injected	Butch Walker	3:03
16.	"She Was My Girl" (Jerry Cantrell)	Jerry Cantrell	Jerry Cantrell; Jeff Tomei	4:18
17.	"Main Titles" (Danny Elfman)	Danny Elfman	Danny Elfman	3:42
18.	"Farewell" (Danny Elfman)	Danny Elfman	Danny Elfman	4:43
19.	"Theme from Spider-Man" (Aerosmith)	J. Robert Harris; Paul Francis Webster	Steven Tyler; Joe Perry; Marti Frederiksen	2:57
20.	"Like A Gunshot *" (Lee-Hom Wang)			4:03

Asian edition bonus track
No.	Title	Length
21.	"Even" (Greyhoundz)	3:46

Indonesian edition bonus track
No.	Title	Length
22.	"Dunia" (/rif)	4:25

Korean edition bonus track
No.	Title	Length
23.	"Moss (Dead Water Love)" (Crash)	4:56

== Use in other works ==
As a tribute to the film, "Weird Al" Yankovic's album Poodle Hat contains the song "Ode to a Superhero", in which he takes the plot of this film but recites it to the tune of Billy Joel's "Piano Man".

== Charts ==
=== Weekly charts ===
Weekly chart performance
Chart (2002)	Peak position
Australian Albums (ARIA)	12
Austrian Albums (Ö3 Austria)	17
Canadian Albums (Billboard)	2
Finnish Albums (Suomen virallinen lista)	27
French Albums (SNEP)	54
German Albums (Offizielle Top 100)	13
Hungarian Albums (MAHASZ)	29
New Zealand Albums (RMNZ)	11
Polish Albums (ZPAV)	24
Swiss Albums (Schweizer Hitparade)	16
UK Rock & Metal Albums (Official Charts)	5
UK Soundtrack Albums (Official Charts)	2
US Billboard 200	4
US Soundtrack Albums (Billboard)	1

=== Year-end charts ===
Year-end chart performance
Chart (2002)	Position
Canadian Albums (Nielsen SoundScan)	34
Canadian Alternative Albums (Nielsen SoundScan)	9
Canadian Metal Albums (Nielsen SoundScan)	6
US Billboard 200	80
US Soundtrack Albums (Billboard)	4

== Certifications ==
Certifications and sales
Region	Certification	Certified units/sales
Australia (ARIA)	Gold	35,000^{^}
New Zealand (RMNZ)	Gold	7,500^{^}
United Kingdom (BPI)	Silver	60,000^{*}
United States (RIAA)	Platinum	1,000,000^{^}
^{*} Sales figures based on certification alone.^{^} Shipments figures based on certification alone.
