= Deborah Kaplan =

American screenwriter (born 1970)

- Born: November 11, 1970 (age 55); Abington, Pennsylvania, U.S.
- Occupations: Screenwriter, film director, producer
- Years active: 1996–present
- Spouse: Breckin Meyer (m. 2001; div. 2014)
- Children: 2

Deborah Kaplan (born November 11, 1970) is an American screenwriter and film director.

== Early life ==
Kaplan was born and raised in Abington, Pennsylvania, and graduated from Abington Senior High School, which served as the setting for the script she wrote for the film, Can't Hardly Wait.

Kaplan attended the Tisch School of the Arts of New York University (NYU). While there she met her creative partner Harry Elfont. They have since written several films together, and directed both Can't Hardly Wait starring Jennifer Love Hewitt, Ethan Embry and Seth Green and Josie and the Pussycats, which featured Rachael Leigh Cook, Tara Reid, Rosario Dawson and Alan Cumming.

== Personal life ==
Kaplan married actor Breckin Meyer on October 14, 2001. They have two daughters together. The couple's separation and subsequent divorce was announced in 2012.

== Filmography as screenwriter (with Harry Elfont) ==
Year	Movies	Notes
1996	A Very Brady Sequel	(with James Berg, and Stan Zimmerman)
1998	Can't Hardly Wait	
2000	The Flintstones in Viva Rock Vegas	(with Jim Cash and Jack Epps Jr.)
2001	Josie and the Pussycats	
2004	Surviving Christmas	(with Jennifer Ventimilia and Joshua Sternin)
2008	Made of Honor	(with Adam Sztykiel)
2010	Leap Year	

Year	Web series
2018–2019	Liza on Demand
