= Harry Elfont =

American screenwriter and film director

- Born: April 5, 1968 (age 58); Philadelphia, Pennsylvania, U.S.
- Occupations: Director, Producer, Screenwriter
- Spouse: Corinne Reilly

Harry Elfont (born April 5, 1968) is an American screenwriter and film director.

Born in Philadelphia, Pennsylvania, and raised in nearby Lower Moreland Township, he met his creative partner Deborah Kaplan while they were both enrolled at the Tisch School of the Arts of New York University (NYU). They have since written several films together, including Can't Hardly Wait and Josie and the Pussycats.

Elfont was inducted into Lower Moreland High School's Hall of Fame in 1998.

Elfont is married to actress Corinne Reilly.
