= Josie and the Pussycats =

Josie and the Pussycats (sometimes simply known as The Pussycats) is a fictional girl group rock band created by Dan DeCarlo for Archie Comics.

== Appearances ==
They have been featured in a number of different media since the 1960s:

- Josie and the Pussycats (comics), also titled She's Josie or Josie, a comic book produced by Archie Comics from 1963 to 1982 and 2016 to present
- Josie and the Pussycats (TV series) (1970–1972), a Saturday morning cartoon produced by Hanna-Barbera Productions; modified and retitled Josie and the Pussycats in Outer Space (1972–1974)
- Josie and the Pussycats (1970s band), bubblegum pop music group that recorded songs for the TV show, and their self-titled 1970 Capitol Records LP
- Josie and the Pussycats (film), a live-action motion picture released in 2001
