= Josie and the Pussycats (1970s band) =

American girl group

Promotional photo of the performers.

Josie and the Pussycats was a 1970s girl group designed to be the real-life incarnation of the eponymous fictional band in the Archie comic book and Hanna-Barbera Saturday morning cartoon series. The group was made up of Cathy Douglas (also known as Cathy Dougher, and whose real name was Kathleen Dougherty), Patrice Holloway, and Cherie Moor (later known as Cheryl Ladd).

Their bubblegum pop album of the same name was released by Capitol Records with Danny Janssen's La La Productions. The group also released six singles in 1970 and 1971. All of the songs were re-released on a 2001 compilation, Stop, Look and Listen – The Capitol Recordings.

== Background ==
In preparation for its upcoming cartoon series, Hanna-Barbera Productions began working on putting together a real-life "Josie and the Pussycats" girl group, which was to provide the singing voices of the girls in the cartoons and also cut an album.

The "Josie and the Pussycats" recordings were produced by La La Productions which included producer-songwriter Danny Janssen (who had written for Bobby Sherman and the Partridge Family), his business partner Bobby Young, and songwriters Austin Roberts, Sue Steward (now known as Sue Sheridan) and Bobby Hart (formerly one of the producer-songwriters for the Monkees). They held a talent search to find three girls who would match the three girls in the comic book in both looks and singing ability, and, after interviewing over 500 finalists, settled upon casting Dougher as Josie, Moor as Melody, and Holloway as Valerie.

African-American with part-Hispanic background, Holloway was the younger sister of Motown legend Brenda Holloway. Having signed with the label as a solo artist in 1965, she was the only one of the three finalists with prior ties to Capitol Records (the label that released the Pussycats' album and singles). Her early Capitol singles, all highly collectible, include "Ecstasy," “Stay With Your Own Kind,” and "Stolen Hours" (released between 1965 and 1967). Most were produced by Hollywood-based writer-producers Billy and Gene Page.

Cheryl Jean Stoppelmoor had come to Hollywood from her native South Dakota with a country and western band that broke up and went back home almost immediately upon arrival. Shortening her unwieldy last name and now going as Cherie Moor, she decided to stay and try her luck as a singer, dancer and actress on television. After marrying David Ladd, she went on to replace Farrah Fawcett in Charlie's Angels prior to the filming of its second season in 1977. She also released a Gold album and a top-40 single ("Think It Over") on Capitol the following year.

Janssen presented the newly formed band to William Hanna and Joseph Barbera to finalize the production deal, but was in for a major surprise. Hanna-Barbera wanted Janssen to recast Holloway, as they had decided to portray "Josie and the Pussycats" as an all-White trio, altering Valerie's character to make her Caucasian. Janssen refused to recast Holloway, whose voice he felt he needed for the soul-inspired bubblegum pop songs he had written, and threatened to walk away from the project. After a three-week-long stand-off between Janssen and Hanna-Barbera, Hanna-Barbera finally relented, allowed Janssen to keep Holloway, and changed Valerie back to being an African-American. Valerie had been introduced in the "Josie" comic book in late 1969, and the character had been African-American from the start.

Word quickly spread around Los Angeles about the stand that Janssen had taken. To show their gratitude, a number of the most notable soul session players in the city offered their services to La La Productions and the Josie album at a fraction of their regular fees. Among them were Elvis Presley's drummer Ronnie Tutt, Presley's bassist Jerry Scheff, keyboardist Clarence MacDonald, flutist Wilton Felder, and guitarist Mike Stewart.

== Overview ==
The Josie and the Pussycats sound is modeled after the late 1960s Detroit acts such as Motown's the Jackson 5 and Hot Wax Records' Honey Cone. A cover of the Jackson 5's "I'll Be There" was featured on the soundtrack album while co-lead vocalist Holloway mimicked young Michael Jackson's singing style. Holloway also sings lead on the Josie and the Pussycats theme song, which was written by Hanna-Barbera musical director Hoyt Curtin, William Hanna and Joseph Barbera. The theme itself is based on a recurring score cue from the Jetsons.

Other lead vocals were performed by Cherie Moor. Although she was cast as the singing voice of Josie, Kathleen Dougherty only sings partial lead vocals on "If That Isn't Love" and "I'll Be There." Also present on the album are covers of Bobby Sherman's "La, La, La (If I Had You)", the Carpenters' "(They Long To Be) Close To You", and Bread's "It Don't Matter to Me".

Although Janssen used strings, horns, keyboards, and oscillators (electronic synthesizers) to create the band's sound, the on-screen cartoon band featured the trio of Josie on guitar, Valerie on tambourine, and Melody on drums.

Josie and the Pussycats: From the Hanna-Barbera TV Show was released on December 15, 1970, by Capitol Records. Six 45 RPM singles were released, four of which contained non-album songs and were available only as part of a Kellogg's mail-order promotion. None of the singles charted, resulting in poor sales and a shelved national tour. Hanna-Barbera contracted producer Jimmie Haskell and a group of anonymous session singers to perform the music for Josie and the Pussycats in Outer Space, and La La Productions' Josie and the Pussycats group was officially disbanded. Janssen and Holloway worked together on several songs after the demise of the band ("Black Mother Goose" and "Evidence," both issued in 1971), and Sue Sheridan (as Sue Steward) cut two solo singles for Capitol under Janssen and Young's supervision. Several years later, Sheridan wrote a few songs for Ladd's self-titled 1978 debut album, also released on Capitol Records.

The album, plus several singles and alternate takes, were collected in a limited edition digitally remastered set entitled Josie and the Pussycats: Stop Look and Listen: The Capitol Recordings, released by Rhino Handmade on October 5, 2001. Rhino pressed 5000 copies of the album. Earlier that same year, Babyface produced a new Josie and the Pussycats album as the soundtrack for the motion picture released by Universal Pictures that same year. This new reincarnation of the Pussycats had a harder, punk-rock sound, as opposed to their Motown 1970 counterparts. Letters to Cleo vocalist Kay Hanley performed all lead vocals.

== Fictional personnel ==
- Josie McCoy – lead vocals, guitar
- Valerie Brown – bass, backing vocals
- Melody Valentine – drums, percussion, backing vocals

== Discography ==
=== Original 1970 album (Capitol/EMI ST-665) ===
Josie and the Pussycats: From the Hanna-Barbera TV Show

Studio album by Josie and the Pussycats
- Released: December 5, 1970
- Recorded: Spring–fall 1970
- Genre: Bubblegum pop
- Length: 23:43
- Label: Capitol
- Producer: Danny Janssen

Professional ratings
Review scores
Source	Rating
AllMusic	3/5 stars

- Side 1
1. "Every Beat of My Heart"
2. "La, La, La (If I Had You)"
3. "Stop, Look and Listen"
4. "Hand Clapping Song"
5. "I'll Be There"
- Side 2
1. "You've Come a Long Way Baby"
2. "(They Long to Be) Close to You"
3. "Roadrunner"
4. "Lie Lie Lie"
5. "It Don't Matter to Me"

=== Stop, Look and Listen – The Capitol Recordings (Rhino Handmade/Atlantic RHM2 7783) ===
CD compilation released in 2001, featuring all original album tracks plus the following:

1. "Every Beat of My Heart" [single version]
2. "It's Alright With Me"
3. "Stop, Look and Listen" [single version]
4. "You've Come a Long Way Baby" [single version]
5. "Letter to Mama"
6. "Inside, Outside, Upside Down"
7. "Josie"
8. "With Every Beat of My Heart"
9. "Voodoo"
10. "If That Isn't Love"
11. "I Wanna Make You Happy"
12. "It's Gotta Be Him"
13. "Lie Lie Lie" [Alternate Mix]
14. "You've Come a Long Way Baby" [alternate mix No. 1]
15. "You've Come a Long Way Baby" [alternate mix No. 2]
16. "Together"
17. "Dreammaker"
18. "Time to Love"
19. "Josie and the Pussycats" (original theme, hidden track)

=== Commercial singles ===
- "Every Beat of My Heart" b/w "It's All Right With Me" (Janssen, Steward; non-album) — Capitol 2967, 1970
- "Stop, Look And Listen" b/w "You've Come a Long Way Baby" — Capitol 3045, February 1971

=== Kellogg's mail order singles from 1970 ===
- "Inside, Outside, Upside-Down" (Janssen, Steward) b/w "A Letter to Mama" (Curtin, Hanna, Barbera) — Capitol Creative Products CP-58
- "Josie" (Curtin, Hanna, Barbera) b/w "With Every Beat of My Heart" (Janssen, Steward)—Capitol Creative Products CP-59
- "Voodoo" (Janssen, Steward) b/w "If That Isn't Love" (Hoyt Curtin, William Hanna, Joseph Barbera) — Capitol Creative Products CP-60
- "It's Gotta Be Him" (Curtin, Hanna, Barbera) b/w "I Wanna Make You Happy" (Janssen, Steward) — Capitol Creative Products CP-61

=== Other recordings ===
These songs appeared in the show and have not been released for consumer purchase. "Clock on the Wall", "I Love You Too Much" and "Dreaming" were not included on the Rhino reissue. "Dreaming" has never been heard in its entirety.

- "Dreammaker" (Janssen, Steward)
- "Clock on the Wall" (Janssen, Roberts)
- "Together" (Janssen, Steward)
- "The Time to Love" (Janssen, Roberts)
- "I Love You Too Much" (Janssen, Steward)
- "Dreaming" (Janssen, Steward)

Cartoon Network remade the original theme song in a short called Musical Evolution, in which the theme song, sung by Christina Fincher, goes through several changes in style, including disco, punk, country, heavy metal, and techno.
