= Dan DeCarlo =

American cartoonist

- Born: Daniel S. DeCarlo; December 12, 1919 New Rochelle, New York, U.S.
- Died: December 18, 2001 (aged 82) New Rochelle, New York, U.S.
- Notable works: Archie Comics: Sabrina the Teenage Witch Josie and the Pussycats Cheryl Blossom; Marvel Comics: Millie the Model
- Awards: Inkpot Award (1991); National Cartoonists Society Award (2000)
- Spouse: Josie Dumont
- Children: 2

Daniel S. DeCarlo (December 12, 1919 – December 18, 2001) was an American cartoonist best known for having developed the look of Archie Comics in the late 1950s and early 1960s, modernizing the characters to their contemporary appearance and establishing the publisher's house style up until his death. He is the generally recognized co-creator of the characters Sabrina the Teenage Witch, Josie and the Pussycats (the title character of which was named for his wife), and Cheryl Blossom.

== Early life and career ==
Dan DeCarlo was born in New Rochelle, New York, the son of a gardener. He attended New Rochelle High School, followed by Manhattan's Art Students League from 1938 to 1941, when he was drafted into the U.S. Army. Stationed in Great Britain, he worked in the motor pool and as a draftsman, and painted company mascots on the noses of airplanes. He also drew a weekly military comic strip, 418th Scandal Sheet. He met his wife, French citizen Josie Dumont, on a blind date in Belgium not long after the Battle of the Bulge.

== Atlas and Archie ==
Sherry the Showgirl #2 (Sept. 1956). Cover art by DeCarlo.

DeCarlo was married, with a pregnant wife, and working as a laborer for his father when he began to pursue a professional art career. Circa 1947, answering an ad, he broke into the comic book industry at Timely Comics, the 1940s iteration of Marvel Comics. Under editor-in-chief Stan Lee, his first assignment was the teen-humor series Jeanie. DeCarlo went uncredited, as was typical for most comic-book writers and artists of the era, and he recalled in 2001, "I went on with her maybe ten books. They used to call me 'The Jeanie Machine' because that was all Stan used to give me, was Jeanie.... Then he took me off Jeanie and he gave me Millie the Model. That was a big break for me. It wasn't doing too well and somehow when I got on it became quite successful."

He went on to an atypically long, 10-year run on that humor series, from issues #18–93 (June 1949 – Nov. 1959), most of them published by Marvel's 1950s predecessor, Atlas Comics. DeCarlo and Lee also took over the My Friend Irma comic strip, spun off from the hit Marie Wilson radio comedy. For a decade, DeCarlo wrote and drew the slapsticky adventures of Millie Collins, her redheaded friendly nemesis Chili Storm and the rest of the cast. He also contributed the short-lived Sherry the Showgirl and Showgirls for Atlas. In 1960, he and Atlas editor-in-chief Stan Lee co-created the short-lived syndicated comic strip Willie Lumpkin, about a suburban mail carrier, for the Chicago-based Publishers Syndicate. A version of the character later appeared as a long-running minor supporting character in Lee's later co-creation, the Marvel Comics series Fantastic Four.

As well during this period, DeCarlo created and drew Standard Comics' futuristic teen-humor comic book Jetta of the 21st Century. Running three issues, #5–7 (Dec. 1952 - April 1953), it featured red-haired Jetta Raye and her friends at Neutron High School.

In addition to his comic-book work, DeCarlo drew freelance pieces for the magazines The Saturday Evening Post and Argosy, as well as Timely/Atlas publisher Martin Goodman's Humorama line of pin-up girl cartoon digests.

DeCarlo first freelanced for Archie Comics, the company with which he became most closely associated, in the late 1950s while still freelancing for Atlas. He said in 2001,

I was looking for extra work. I went down to see Harry Shorten [at Archie] and he gave me a job. The pay wasn't too good, but I did it and he liked it – but I didn't go back right away. Finally after two or three weeks go, he called me up and wanted to know what happened, why I wasn't around. I said, 'Well, you know I'm very busy.' ... I had Millie the Model, I had My Friend Irma, [and] Big Boy. ... I told him, 'The people that I'm working for now let me do my own thing. But when I do work for you, it's "Draw like Bob Montana." And it's hard to look at your reference, and then back at your own page. It's very slow, and very tedious and I didn't like it too much.' He said, 'Come on in, and you can draw any way you like.' That made me go back with him.

DeCarlo is tentatively identified with Archie as early as the Jughead story "The Big Shot" in Archie Comics #48 (Feb. 1951), with his earliest confirmed credit the 3 3/4-page story "No Picnic" in Archie's Girls Betty and Veronica #4 (published in September 1951). His art soon established the publisher's house style. As well, he is the generally recognized creator of the teen-humor characters Sabrina the Teenage Witch, Josie and the Pussycats, and Cheryl Blossom.

=== Josie ===
DeCarlo created Josie on his own in the late 1950s; his wife, named Josie, said in an interview quoted in a DeCarlo obituary, "We went on a Caribbean cruise, and I had a [cat] costume for the cruise, and that's the way it started." DeCarlo first tried to sell the character as a syndicated comic strip called Here's Josie, recalling in 2001:

When Publishers Syndicate in Chicago got interested in Willie Lumpkin ... I was also hustling my own strip and trying to get it published. Before we got to Publishers Syndicate, I went to United Feature in New York City with two strips — Barney's Beat and Josie. [United Feature] told me they liked them both, and they'd like to see more samples, because I didn't bring much. I brought maybe six dailies of Barney's Beat and six dailies of Josie. That posed a problem for me. I knew I couldn't handle both strips and still keep up with the comic book work, because a syndicated bit was very risky. So, I decided to shelve Josie, and concentrated on Willie Lumpkin. [When that strip ended after] a year, maybe a year and a half[,] I quickly submitted the Josie strip back to the publishers and Harold Anderson, and he sent it back and said, 'It's not what we're looking for, Dan, but keep up the good work,' or words of that kind. Then is when I decided to take it to Archie to see if they could do it as a comic book. I showed it to Richard Goldwater, and he showed it to his father, and a day or two later I got the OK to do it as a comic book.

Original art panels from "The Reformer" in Archie's Girls Betty and Veronica No. 157 (Jan. 1969), featuring (l. to r.) Veronica Lodge and Archie Andrews. Penciled by DeCarlo, inked by Rudy Lapick.

Josie was introduced in Archie's Pals 'n' Gals #23. The first issue of She's Josie followed, cover-dated February 1963. The series featured levelheaded, sweet-natured Josie, her blonde bombshell friend Melody, and bookwormish brunette Pepper. These early years also featured the characters of Josie and Pepper's boyfriends Albert and Sock (real name Socrates); Albert's rival Alexander Cabot III; and Alex's twin sister Alexandra. Occasionally Josie and her friends appeared in "crossover" issues with the main Archie characters. She's Josie was renamed Josie with issue #17 (Dec. 1965), and again renamed, to Josie and the Pussycats, with issue #45 (Dec. 1969), whereby Pepper was replaced by Valerie and Albert was replaced by Alan M. Under this title, the series finished its run with issue #106 (Oct. 1982). Josie and her gang also made irregular appearances in Pep Comics and Laugh Comics during the 1960s.

1956 example of DeCarlo's cartoon work for men's magazines. "Allan, are you trying to pull the wool over my eyes?"

When Universal Pictures was preparing the live-action movie adaptation Josie and the Pussycats in 2001, DeCarlo and Archie Comics became involved in a lawsuit over the character's creation, leading the publisher to terminate its 43-year relationship with him. A federal district court ruled in 2001 that Archie Comics owned the copyright to the Josie characters; this decision was affirmed by the Second Circuit Court of Appeals. On December 11, 2001, the U.S. Supreme Court rejected an appeal filed by DeCarlo's attorney, Whitney Seymour Jr., who had argued that the issue was a matter of state property law and not federal copyright law.

DeCarlo was listed as a creator in the end credits of the film Josie and the Pussycats. He received credit as co-creator of the live-action television show Sabrina the Teenage Witch.

Among DeCarlo's final works were a story for Paul Dini's independent comics series Jingle Belle, and stories for Bongo Comics' The Simpsons TV tie-in comic, Bart Simpson.

=== Death ===
DeCarlo died in New Rochelle, New York, of pneumonia. Comics creator Paul Dini said upon DeCarlo's death, "It was tragic that when he was at an age when many cartoonists are revered as treasures by more beneficent publishers, Dan felt spurned and slighted by the owners of properties that prospered greatly from his contributions."

== Personal life ==
His twin sons, Dan Jr. and James "Jim" DeCarlo (born January 27, 1948) were also prolific Archie artists, penciling and inking respectively. The two predeceased their father. Dan Jr. died in October 1990 of stomach cancer, and James died in August 1991 from complications from a stroke. Josie DeCarlo, the inspiration for the Archie character Josie, died in her sleep on March 14, 2012.

== Josie DeCarlo ==
Josette Marie "Josie" DeCarlo (née Dumont; September 8, 1923 – March 14, 2012) was a French-born model who became the inspiration and namesake for Josie McCoy of Josie and the Pussycats comics and the 1970 Hanna-Barbera Saturday morning cartoon series.

She met future husband Dan DeCarlo on a blind date in Belgium in 1945, Shortly after the Battle of the Bulge. At the time, Dumont did not speak English, while DeCarlo, a member of the U.S. Army during World War II, spoke very little French.

Unable to have a conversation due to their language barrier, the two communicated through his cartoons. She later explained, "We communicated with drawing.... He would draw things for me to make me understand what he had in mind. He was really so amusing. Instead of just using words, he would use cartoons to express himself. Right away, we knew that we were meant for each other." The couple married in 1946.

She became the inspiration for Josie and the Pussycats while the couple were on a cruise. Josie DeCarlo wore a catsuit costume during the cruise, which became the basis for the fictional Josie and the Pussycats trademark outfits.

Later, when she got a new hairdo, Dan DeCarlo incorporated it into the Josie character as well, "The hairdo came after... One day, I came in with a new hairdo with a little bow in my hair, and he said, 'That's it!'" Dan DeCarlo drew his wife with the cat costume as Josie McCoy and naming the starring character Josie. Josie first appeared in Archie Comics in 1962. The character was voiced by actress Janet Waldo in the television series.

After her husband's death in 2001, Josie DeCarlo remained active in the comics and animation industries, promoting his work.

Josie DeCarlo died in her sleep on March 14, 2012, aged 88. Her funeral was held in Scarsdale, New York.

== Awards ==
DeCarlo won the National Cartoonists Society Award for Best Comic Book in 2000 for Betty & Veronica. He was nominated for the Academy of Comic Book Arts' Shazam Award for Best Penciller (Humor Division) in 1974.

== Legacy ==
Love and Rockets co-creators Jaime Hernandez and Gilbert Hernandez cite DeCarlo as an artistic influence.

Artist/animator Bruce Timm, best known for his contributions to the DC Animated Universe, has cited Dan DeCarlo as one of his influences.
