= Patrice Holloway =

Musical artist (1951–2006)

- Holloway on the cover of the Josie and the Pussycats album in 1970

Background information
- Born: Patrice Yvonne Holloway; March 23, 1951; Los Angeles, California, U.S.
- Died: October 3, 2006 (aged 55) Los Angeles, California, U.S.
- Genres: Soul, Pop
- Occupations: Singer
- Labels: Capitol, Motown
- Formerly of: Josie and the Pussycats; The Ikettes; The Blackberries

Patrice Yvonne Holloway (March 23, 1951 – October 3, 2006) was an American soul and bubblegum pop singer-songwriter, best known as a member of the musical trios Josie and the Pussycats, The Ikettes, and The Blackberries.

== Career ==
Patrice Yvonne Holloway was born on March 23, 1951, in Los Angeles, California, the youngest of three children born to Wade Holloway Sr. (August 13, 1920 – June 24, 2001) and his wife, the former Johnnie Mae Fossett.

She was the younger sister of fellow Motown artist Brenda Holloway. She recorded such songs as "The Touch of Venus" and "For the Love of Mike", none of which were released. She recorded a few minor singles for the Capitol Records label during the mid-1960s, notably "That's The Chance You've Got To Take", "Love And Desire", "Ecstasy" and "Stolen Hours", which became popular on the Northern Soul scene in the 1970s.

She sang background vocals with her sister on many records for other artists, including Joe Cocker and the Grease Band's 1968 cover version of The Beatles' "With a Little Help from My Friends", later the theme song to the 1980s television series The Wonder Years.

She recorded the soul classic, "Stay With Your Own Kind", which was noteworthy for its direct treatment of inter-racial relationships at a time when this was highly controversial. Patrice also co-wrote 'You've Made Me So Very Happy', which in 1969 rose to No. 3 on the Billboard Hot 100 when the band Blood Sweat & Tears covered it, two years after it was co-written and originally recorded by her sister, Brenda.

Holloway is most noted for her work as the singing voice of Valerie in Hanna-Barbera's 1970 Josie and the Pussycats television series and on the concurrent Josie and the Pussycats album. Valerie was the first female African-American cartoon character to star as a television series regular (and the first of any gender also voiced by Black artists, Barbara Pariot being her speaking voice), and was nearly cut from the show until Hanna-Barbera could convince the networks and sponsors to allow more time and budget to change the production artwork from the Caucasian character of Pepper (from the original comic book). Record producer Danny Janssen recalled that H-B was "very nice" about it, and he only agreed to stay with the project if Patrice stayed, as he felt her voice was necessary to produce the Jackson 5-esque bubblegum pop that H-B had requested he produce.

Valerie was added to the comic book at the same time Hanna-Barbera's TV series was in production. Because of this, all subsequent versions of Josie and the Pussycats, including the live-action movie, are most strongly influenced by the cartoon series. It is Patrice's voice that does lead on the series' theme song, "Josie and The Pussycats", amongst many other songs.

After the first season of Josie, Holloway recorded a few solo singles, produced by Janssen, for Capitol Records. Neither she, nor Pussycats bandmates Cheryl Ladd and Cathy Dougher, performed the songs for the second season, which was titled Josie and the Pussycats in Outer Space.

Holloway died of a heart attack at the age of 55 on October 3, 2006, in Los Angeles, California.

== Selected discography ==
=== Singles ===
- 1963: "Stevie" b/w "(He Is) The Boy of My Dreams" (V.I.P. 25001)
- 1966: "Stolen Hours" b/w "Lucky, My Boy" (Capitol/EMI)
- 1967: "Love and Desire" b/w "Ecstasy" (Capitol/EMI)
- 1967: "Stay with Your Own Kind" b/w "That's All You Got To Do" (Capitol/EMI 5985)
- 1971: "That's The Chance You Gotta Take" b/w "Evidence" (Capitol/EMI)
- 1972: "Black Mother Goose" b/w "That's The Chance You Gotta Take" (Capitol/EMI)

=== Backing vocal credits ===
- 1968: Joe Cocker – "With a Little Help from My Friends"
- 1969: Diana Ross & the Supremes – "Someday We'll Be Together"
- 1969: Thelma Houston – Sunshower
- 1969: Joe Cocker – Joe Cocker!
- 1970: Kim Weston - Kim Kim Kim
- 1970: Diana Ross – "Reach Out and Touch"
- 1971: Beaver & Krause – Gandharva
- 1972: Buffy Sainte-Marie – Moonshot
