= Sebastian Cabot =

Sebastian Cabot may refer to:

- Sebastian Cabot (explorer) (1476–1557), Italian explorer
- Sebastian Cabot (actor) (1918–1977), British actor
- Sebastian Cabot, a fictional character in the Josie and the Pussycats comic books and related media.
