= Josie and the Pussycats (comics) =

Teen-oriented comic book

- Josie and the Pussycats 48 Page Giant #1 (1993). Cover art by Dan DeCarlo.

Publication information
- Publisher: Archie Comics
- Schedule: (vol. 1); Varied (vol. 2); Monthly
- Format: Ongoing
- Publication date: (vol. 1); February 1963 – October 1982; 1993 (vol. 2); September 2016 – 2017
- No. of issues: (vol. 1): 106 (vol. 2): 9

Creative team
- Created by: Dan DeCarlo
- Written by: (vol. 1); Various (vol. 2); Marguerite Bennett and Cameron DeOrdio
- Artist(s): (vol. 1); Dan DeCarlo (vol. 2); Audrey Mok

Josie and the Pussycats (initially published as She's Josie and Josie) is a teen-humor comic book about a fictional rock band, created by Dan DeCarlo and published by Archie Comics. First published in 1963, with regular issues through 1982, additional one-shot issues followed on an irregular basis. A reboot of the comic for the New Riverdale imprint launched in September 2016.

Hanna–Barbera adapted the comic as a Saturday-morning animated TV series in 1970, paired with an eponymous pop album. The band was subsequently portrayed in a 2001 live-action film, with musical performances released on an eponymous soundtrack album. Josie and the Pussycats appear as part of the 2017 live-action television drama series Riverdale on The CW, with the character of Josie recurring in the Katy Keene spin-off series.

== Publication history ==
Cartoonist Dan DeCarlo, who had spent most of the 1950s drawing teen and career-girl humor comics such as Millie the Model for Atlas Comics, that decade's forerunner of Marvel Comics, began freelancing for Archie Comics. In 1960, he and Atlas editor-in-chief Stan Lee co-created the short-lived syndicated comic strip Willie Lumpkin, about a suburban mail carrier, for the Chicago, Illinois-based Publishers Syndicate. Casting about for more comic-strip work, DeCarlo created the characters of Josie and her friends. Josie DeCarlo, the artist's wife and Josie's namesake, explained that "We went on a Caribbean cruise, and I had a [cat] costume for the cruise, and that's the way it started."

DeCarlo first tried to sell the character as a syndicated comic strip called Here's Josie, recalling in 2001:

When Publishers Syndicate in Chicago got interested in Willie Lumpkin ... I was also hustling my own strip and trying to get it published. Before we got to Publishers Syndicate, I went to United Features in New York with two strips — Barney's Beat and Josie. [United Feature] told me they liked them both, and they'd like to see more samples, because I didn't bring much. I brought maybe six dailies of Barney's Beat and six dailies of Josie. That posed a problem for me. I knew I couldn't handle both strips and still keep up with the comic book work, because a syndicated bit was very risky. So, I decided to shelve Josie, and concentrated on Willie Lumpkin. Once publishers got interested in it, it was a year in developing, and it was launched, I think, in 1960. But Willie Lumpkin didn't last long—it only last [sic] a little better than a year, maybe a year and a half. I quickly submitted the Josie strip back to Publishers and Harold Anderson, and he sent it back and said, 'It's not what we're looking for, Dan, but keep up the good work,' or words of that kind. Then is when I decided to take it to Archie to see if they could do it as a comic book. I showed it to Richard Goldwater, and he showed it to his father, and a day or two later I got the OK to do it as a comic book.

Josie was introduced in a solo series, She's Josie. The first issue was cover-dated February 1963. (Note: Some sources give a story in Archie's Pals 'n' Gals #23, cover-dated Winter 1962–1963, as Josie's first appearance. However, copyright records show the publication (on-sale) date for She's Josie #1 was December 10, 1962, while Archie's Pals 'n' Gals #23 was published December 17, 1962.) The series featured levelheaded, sweet-natured redhead Josie, her ditzy blonde bombshell friend Melody, and the brainy, cynical, bespectacled brunette Pepper. These early years also featured the characters of Josie's beatnik boyfriend Albert; Pepper's strong but not-too-bright boyfriend Socrates ("Sock" for short); Albert's rival Alexander Cabot III, who chased after both Josie and Melody; and Alex's obnoxious twin sister Alexandra Cabot. None of the mainstream Archie characters appeared with Josie until the ninth issue of her own title. Josie and her friends occasionally appeared in "crossover" issues with the main Archie characters. She's Josie displayed a new Josie-only logo beginning with issue #14 (August, 1965), was officially renamed Josie with issue #17 (December, 1965), and again renamed, to Josie and the Pussycats, with issue #45 (December, 1969). The series finished its run under this title with issue #106 (October, 1982). Josie and her gang also made irregular appearances in Pep Comics and Laugh Comics during the 1960s.

In 1969, Archie Comics made several changes to the Josie comic:

- In Josie #42 (August 1969), Josie met a heavily built blond folk singer named Alan M. who, over time, became Josie's on-again, off-again boyfriend (much to the chagrin of Alexandra, who was also immediately smitten with Alan M. and never missed an opportunity to try and steal him away).
- In Josie #43 (September 1969), Alexandra discovered that her cat Sebastian was actually a reincarnation of an ancestor of the Cabot family, who was executed for consorting with witches. Whenever Alexandra held Sebastian in her arms, she could cast magic spells. Alexandra generally used her powers to compete with Josie for Alan M., but the spells she cast usually backfired in some way. Moreover, her spells ended whenever someone nearby snapped their fingers (which happened often). Alexandra and Sebastian's witchy powers were not used in Hanna-Barbera's TV show, and they were soon discontinued in the comic as well.
- In Josie and the Pussycats #45 (December 1969), the first issue to bear that new title, Josie and Melody decided to start a band called the Pussycats. Alexandra was asked to be their bassist, but she insisted that the group's name be to "Alexandra's Cool Time Cats"; so, instead, Valerie Smith, a new girl in school, was recruited to play bass. The Pussycats made their leopard print band uniforms (complete with cat-ear headbands and long tails) and performed at their first gig, a school dance, as a seething Alexandra tried unsuccessfully to use her witchcraft for revenge.

The reimagining of the comic resulted in three casualties: Albert, Sock, and Pepper, who were phased out altogether. From 1970 on, most of the stories in the comic book revolved around the Pussycats traveling around the country and the world to perform gigs, with Alan M., Alex, and Alexandra (and sometimes Sebastian) in tow. When the girls were not performing, they dealt with the various trials and tribulations of teenage life, often including Alex's jealousy of Alan M. and Alexandra's jealousy of Josie. The Josie and the Pussycats comic ran until 1982, after which the girls were featured in various Archie Giant Series issues and miniseries and one-shot comics of their own. Reprinted Josie stories (including the occasional pre-Pussycats stories) appear frequently in the various Archie Library digests. Archie & Friends #47-95 (June 2001-November 2005) featured new Josie and the Pussycats stories in the regular house style after the 2001 film renewed interest in the series. They later appeared in a new two-part story, "Battle of the Bands", in Archie & Friends #130-131 (June–July 2009).

=== Manga makeover ===
In March 2005, Archie Comics announced that a manga version of the title would be published, with art by Tania del Rio, who was also responsible for the manga makeover of Sabrina, the Teenage Witch. The first such "Josie and the Pussycasts" story, "Opening Act" ran in Tales from Riverdale Digest #3 (August 2005) The band had previously appeared in manga form in issue Sabrina, The Teenage Witch #67 (August 2005).

In Archie & Friends #96 (January 2006) the origin of the Pussycats was retconned. The manga version implies that none of the characters previously knew each other. Josie Jones was cut from the school choir, but met Valerie Smith and the two founded the band. They recruited Melody, whose idea it was to wear cat outfits. The band was not doing well at first, but Alex liked the group, though Alexandra could tell he was more interested in Josie. Alex's father let him be the manager as long as he did not use his wealth to help make them stars. In Sabrina the Teenage Witch #72 (February 2006), a stranger named Alan helped carry their equipment. Josie, already attracted to Alan, jealously thought there was an attraction between Alan and Melody. Alex hired him as their stagehand.

The manga focused on the group's attempt to reach fame rather than on their career after they have already achieved it. It featured characters not seen in other comics, including Alan's younger sister Alison and the rival group the Vixens. The manga version was not popular among readers, who preferred the traditional style. Its final appearance was in Archie & Friends #104 (December 2006). A Katy Keene revival replaced it (both featured alongside each other in the latter part of the manga's run), though it, too, did not last.

=== Afterlife with Archie ===
In the world of Afterlife with Archie, Josie and the Pussycats are revealed to be vampires. Josephine McCoy is orphaned shortly after her birth in 1906 and winds up in an orphanage run by Alexandra Cabot, who has three other children: Melody, Valerie, and Pepper. Due to their singing talent, "Uncle Buddy" (one of Alexandra's friends) takes the trio on tour, eventually forcing Pepper to marry him. Shortly after this, Josie, Melody and Valerie are turned into vampires. The three then go on to become several short lived groups, with "Josie and the Pussycats" being the latest incarnation. In the 1980s, Pepper finds Josie and tries to blackmail Josie into turning her into a vampire. Josie tries to explain that becoming a vampire locks you into the state you were in when you were turned. Pepper won't listen and Josie is forced to kill her childhood friend. Josie them mesmerizes the interviewer she has been telling this to so the three of them can feed. Later on, on their jet, they detect irregularities at their destination of Riverdale, deciding to land there anyway rather than detour.

=== Reboot ===
On June 8, 2016, a reboot of the series was announced in the same style of the Archie, Jughead, and Betty & Veronica reboots as part of the New Riverdale imprint. The series is co-written by Marguerite Bennett and Cameron DeOrdio with the art by Audrey Mok. The reboot features Josie uniting the band to take their big shot at musical stardom, only to contend with the machinations of Alexandra Cabot, the ever-Machiavellian sister of the Pussycats’ manager. The first issue was released on September 28, 2016.

== Characters ==
=== Josie ===
A short-haired redhead, Josie is the leader and co-founder of the Pussycats. She is the lead vocalist and songwriter and plays guitar. Portrayed as a sweet, attractive, and level-headed teenage girl, Josie is usually the stable center in the middle of the chaos surrounding her band and her friends.

Josie's surname has been inconsistent. It was alternately "Jones" or "James" for much of the comic's run. McCoy was her surname for the 2001 movie. Archie Comics later sometimes acknowledged the surnames from the movie as canonical, though not consistently. In a few stories reprinted in the 2000s decade, Archie Comics changed her surname to McCoy. However, the manga version used "Jones", which was her first surname to actually appear in the comics.

During the early years of her comic (1963–1969), Josie dated a guitarist named Albert. During and after the Josie and the Pussycats revamp, she dated Alan M. Mayberry. Alexander Cabot is regularly attracted to her in the comics. Though she is known to date him, she really loves Alan M.

In the cartoon series, Josie's speaking voice was performed by Janet Waldo (the voice of Judy Jetson and Penelope Pitstop) and her singing voice was performed by Cathy Dougher. She was played by Rachael Leigh Cook in the 2001 live-action Josie and the Pussycats movie (singing voice performed by Kay Hanley). She appeared in The CW series Riverdale with Ashleigh Murray portraying her as an African American and lead singer of the band. Murray eventually left the show and joined the spinoff Katy Keene. She returns as a special guest star in the musical episode "Chapter Ninety-One: The Return of the Pussycats", which is centered on her, Pussycats Valerie and Melody, and Alexandra Cabot.

Josie was ranked 77th in Comics Buyer's Guide's "100 Sexiest Women in Comics" list.

=== Melody Valentine ===
The co-founder and drummer for the Pussycats (she also sang occasional lead vocals for the TV series), Melody is a cute, vivacious blonde and usually speaks in a sing-song voice, denoted by the musical notes in her cartoon word balloons. She is a slightly ditzy, bubbly sort of character, often taken to using silly nonsense language and provides much of the comic relief of the series.

Melody is almost never given a surname in a comic story. Occasionally, she is called "Melody Jones". At these times, the name "James" is used for Josie to avoid confusion. However, the manga, having settled on the name "Josie Jones", essentially nullifies this. The 2001 movie establishes her surname as Valentine, a name that Archie Comics has accepted.

Many comic stories use Melody's beauty as a plot device. When male characters see her, they uncontrollably fall for her and lose all sense of anything else, frequently leading to chaos; although, she is usually oblivious to this. Despite any trouble that occurs for her or her friends, Melody maintains a cheerful, optimistic attitude.

In the cartoon series, whenever the group is in a dangerous or potentially dangerous situation, Melody's ears would wiggle. She is frequently brainwashed by villains, but is already rather scatterbrained. Later, in the Josie and the Pussycats in Outer Space series, she adopts a cute little alien named "Bleep".

Melody's speaking voice is performed by Jackie Joseph, and her singing voice is performed by Cheryl Ladd (credited as Cherie Moor). She was played by Tara Reid in the live-action film. Bleep's voice was done by Don Messick (also the voice of Scooby-Doo, Astro, Dr. Benton Quest, Boo Boo Bear, and more). Ashanti Bromfield portrayed her in the CW series Riverdale.

=== Valerie Brown ===
In addition to being the group's main songwriter and a multi-instrumentalist, dark-haired Valerie also performs back-up vocals (in the comics, cartoons, and the movie) and occasionally sings lead (nearly always in the TV series) for the Pussycats. In the comics and the movie, she is the group's dedicated bassist; in the cartoons, she plays tambourine. In the comic book, she replaced Pepper, a sharp-minded spectacled brunette.

Valerie's surname may be the most definite of the three. Archie Comics have occasionally used the name "Brown" from the movie on their website and in promotional material, but in the comics, she is always called Valerie Smith. But recently, the "Brown" surname has been used again in comics and the Riverdale TV series. The return of the Brown surname happens due to the return of the Pepper Smith character in the New Riverdale and Archie Horror universe.

In the comics, Valerie is more tomboyish than her two bandmates. Besides being good at science and a skilled auto mechanic, she occasionally shows a quick temper as well as being physically stronger than she might appear. She is also less concerned about her appearance or her love life than Josie, Melody or Alexandra, and had rarely been seen in a romantic relationship, though in the cartoons she seems attracted to Alexander. In 2010, she began an on-again, off-again romantic relationship with Archie Andrews, although her band's touring schedule often keeps her out of Riverdale and away from Archie (much to the relief of Veronica Lodge and Betty Cooper, Archie's other girlfriends).

In the animated series, she is somewhat similar to Velma Dinkley from Scooby-Doo and they met in a 1973 episode of The New Scooby-Doo Movies, "The Haunted Showboat". She is the character who saves the day the most often, thanks to her street smarts and her mechanical and scientific genius. In the comics, this is downplayed, although she is still the most intelligent of the group. Valerie is the first African-American (non-white) female cartoon character on a regular animated television series.

Valerie's speaking voice is performed by Barbara Pariot, and her singing voice is performed by Patrice Holloway, sister of Motown recording artist Brenda Holloway. She was played by Rosario Dawson in the live-action film. Hayley Law portrayed her in the CW series Riverdale.

=== Alexander Cabot III ===
Rich, temperamental, and cowardly, Alexander is the Pussycats' shifty and not-too-dependable manager. He often gets the group in hot water because of his crazy promotional schemes. Alexander wears sunglasses often and likes to flaunt his wealth, typically dressing in flamboyant and expensive clothing.

In the comics, Alexander is reminiscent of Reggie Mantle. He has a crush on Josie and often tries to divert her attention from her boyfriend, Alan M. He is blunt and critical towards Alan M., regarding him as all brawn and no brains. Occasionally, Alexander will take an interest in Melody, particularly when Josie is unavailable. The interest seems genuine, since, unlike other boys, who fall helplessly in love with Melody at first sight, Alexander tends to remain composed around her.

Alexander's personality is markedly different in the animated series; he is much friendlier, though no more dependable and far more cowardly than his comic strip alter ego. In this context, he most often serves as a comedic foil for Alexandra's constant scheming. The animated version of Alexander also exhibits no romantic feelings towards Josie, tends to gravitate towards Melody or Valerie, depending on interpretation, and is very similar to Shaggy Rogers from Scooby-Doo.

The animated depiction of Alexander was voiced by Casey Kasem, who also voiced Shaggy. In a 1973 Josie-guested episode of The New Scooby-Doo Movies, Alexander and Shaggy both appear on-screen together for quite some time. Alexander was played by Paulo Costanzo in the 2001 live-action motion picture. He appears as a supporting regular character on The CW's live-action series Katy Keene, portrayed by Lucien Laviscount.

=== Alexandra Cabot and Sebastian ===
Alexandra is technically a supporting character, but often overshadows the rest of the cast in both the comics and the cartoons. She is Alexander's fraternal twin sister in the comics; the 1970 cartoon series does not establish the siblings as twins, but that Alexandra is the younger sibling.

Alexandra is usually depicted as having black hair with a white lightning-bolt shaped stripe running through the middle of it, giving her ponytail a slight impression of a skunk's tail. In some early comics, however, she sports a short bob minus the streak. In contrast to the good-natured girls in the Pussycats, Alexandra is cynical, hateful, cantankerous, mean, offensive, rude, envious, scheming and self-centered. She is insanely jealous of the Pussycats, especially Josie, who she never has a kind word about. Despite having no vocal or musical talent at all, Alexandra desperately wants to be a star; her conditions for joining the Pussycats were that she be made the lead and that the band be renamed Alexandra's Cool Time Cats.

Alexandra has an enormous crush on Alan M., and often tries to steal him away from Josie. In the comics, although she is not particularly fond of her brother, Alexandra often joins forces with him to separate Alan M. and Josie, which would benefit both siblings, since Alexander is interested in Josie. Alexandra's personality in the cartoon is largely unchanged.

Sebastian is a tuxedo cat, and Alexandra's sidekick. In the comics, Sebastian is the reincarnation of Sebastian Cabot, a witchcraft-practicing ancestor of the Cabot family. Alexandra finds that, by holding Sebastian in her arms, she can cast powerful magic spells (Alexandra and Sebastian's bond is represented in that they both have a matching white stripe in the middle of their hair/fur). This plot device was sporadically employed by various writers at Archie over the years; Alexandra was later shown to be able to cast spells on her own. In the cartoon, Alexandra and Sebastian do not have magic powers but they still have their white stripes. Sebastian usually follows Alexandra's schemes when it comes to getting in between Josie and Alan, but unlike Alexandra, he has no real grudge or dislike towards Josie and is usually shown to be friendly to her.

Alexandra's voice in the cartoons is provided by former Mouseketeer Sherry Alberoni, while Don Messick supplies the meows, screams, and Muttley-esque snickers for Sebastian. Alexandra was played by Missi Pyle in the live-action Josie and the Pussycats movie, while Sebastian does not appear in the live-action film.

Alexandra appears as a supporting regular character who dislikes Josie McCoy on The CW's live-action series Katy Keene, portrayed by Camille Hyde. This version of Alexandra is the senior vice president of Cabot Entertainment. Similar to in the comics, she dislikes Josie. In Katy Keene, Alexander and Alexandra are step-siblings (posing as twins in public), a relationship complicated by their having dated in high school before Alexander's father and Alexandra's mother later married. Hyde also reprised her role in the musical episode "Chapter Ninety-One: The Return of the Pussycats" from the fifth season of Riverdale. Sebastian is mentioned in two episodes of Katy Keene.

=== Alan M. Mayberry ===
Alan M. Mayberry (known as "Alan M." in the comics, and as simply "Alan" in the cartoon series) is a tall, blond, muscular folk singer who serves as the Pussycats' roadie. He is also Josie's on-off boyfriend, but Alexandra is constantly trying to win a date with him.

In the comics, he replaced Josie's former boyfriend and Alex's former rival Albert. In his first comic book appearance, the creators tried to give him and Alex their own band, The Jesters, but it did not last beyond one issue, and the comic took a different direction. Though Alex looks down on Alan M. and insults his intelligence, Alan M. has more common sense than Alex does. Despite being one of the six main characters, he appeared less often in the comics in the 1980s onward.

In the cartoon series, he plays the role of the self-appointed group leader, similar to that of Fred Jones from Scooby-Doo (and perhaps not coincidentally does bear some resemblance to him as well). His and Alex's characters were changed in an attempt to recapture Scooby-Doo's success.

Alan M.'s animated persona is voiced by Jerry Dexter. He was played by Gabriel Mann in the live-action film. In Riverdale, he appears as a guest character in the musical episode "Chapter Ninety-One: The Return of the Pussycats", portrayed by Chris McNally.

=== Other recurring characters ===
- Pepper Smith: Josie's best friend in the original comics, and, until the 1969 renovation, one of the main five characters (along with Josie, Melody, Albert and Alex). She had short-cropped black hair, conservative spectacles, wore clothes that were less formfitting than her friends, and was noted for her sharp wit and cynical nature. She dated Sock, but to his frustration, she preferred to remain emotionally reserved when it came to boys. The original comic focused on three girls (a redhead, a brunette and a blonde) who were frequently seen together, but Pepper was dropped from the comics and replaced by Valerie. This change has no explanation, as Albert and Pepper's roles are similar to their replacements’. Pepper made a small cameo appearance in Part 3 of 2007's “Civil Chore” in Tales from Riverdale (Alan M. was notably absent). Pepper later had a more prominent role in the 2016-17 Josie and the Pussycats comic series by Marguerite Bennett and Cameron DeOrdio. She appears as a lead character in The CW's live-action series Katy Keene, portrayed by Julia Chan.
- Albert: Sometimes seen as a mischievous goofball, but at other times quite sensitive, he was Josie's boyfriend in the original comics and one of the original male leads. He was also Alex's rival. However, while the Pussycats-era Alex was similar to Reggie Mantle, Albert and Alex were more like a male Betty and Veronica: good friends until it came to the girl they competed for. Alexandra tried unsuccessfully to get him to date her. Albert was fond of playing the guitar and singing, and also liked to ride his motor scooter. Often portrayed as member of the 1960s counterculture, he went from being a beatnik to a folk singer to a mod and finally to a hippie (depending on the year of the issue) before he was finally dropped from the comics. Alan M. would fill his old role. Since then, he, Pepper and a few other characters would only appear in stories reprinted in digests.
- Sock: His real name was Socrates, and he was a jock who dated Pepper and was a good friend of Albert's. Like a stereotypical jock, he was not very intelligent, but this was not exaggerated as it is with Moose Mason. Despite lasting up to and including Alan M.'s first story, he, like Alexandra, remained a supporting character. Unlike Albert and Pepper, he was removed from the comics with no actual replacement character.
- Alexander Cabot II: Alex and Alexandra's very rich father. He is slightly heavyset, his hair is turning white, and he is often frustrated with the ideas of his children. He insists that the band his son manages earn their own fame without the help of his millions. He appears as a guest character in The CW's live-action series Katy Keene, portrayed by Peter Francis James.
- Josie's father: He is a slim, middle-aged man who has dark hair with a wisp of gray. His name, depending on the source, is Mr. McCoy, Mr. Jones or Mr. James. He is totally supportive of his daughter's music career. In Riverdale, he is named Myles McCoy and he appears as a guest character, portrayed by Reese Alexander.
- Cricket O'Dell: The familiar Archie character made a few appearances in the original Josie comics. A pert, friendly girl with an amazing talent: she is able to smell money or monetary values. In Katy Keene, she appears as a recurring character and was portrayed by Azriel Crews.
- Sheldon: A short, fat glutton from a few stories in the late 1960s who occasionally dated Melody. Despite his lack of importance, his final appearance was after the Pussycats' makeover.
- Clyde Didit: Best known as the star of Archie's Mad House, Clyde appeared for a few issues in Josie in the late 1960s.
- Mr. Tuttle: The principal of Midvale High School where Josie and her friends attend. He made a number appearances in the pre-Pussycats comics.
- Archie's Gang: The main characters often crossover with Josie and the Pussycats (and vice versa), sometimes in stories involving the Archies.
- The Vixens: A rival rock trio that Alexandra manages. Although they are glamorous, they have no musical talent (a fact that Alexandra somehow overlooked). Exclusive to the manga version.

== In other media ==
=== Film ===
==== Live-action ====
Josie and the Pussycats is a 2001 Canadian-American musical comedy film released by Universal Pictures, and Metro-Goldwyn-Mayer. Directed and co-written by Harry Elfont and Deborah Kaplan, the film is loosely based upon the comic and the Hanna-Barbera cartoon. The film is about a young all-female band that signs a record contract with a major record label, only to discover that the company does not have the musicians' best interests at heart. The film stars Rachael Leigh Cook, Tara Reid, and Rosario Dawson as the Pussycats, with Alan Cumming, Parker Posey, and Gabriel Mann in supporting roles. The film received mixed reviews and was a box office bomb, earning about $15 million against a $39 million budget.

=== Television ===
==== Animated ====
During the 1968-1969 television season, the first Archie-based Saturday morning cartoon, The Archie Show, debuted on CBS. The Archie Show, produced by Filmation Studios, was not only a hit on TV, but spun off a radio hit as well (the Archies' song "Sugar, Sugar" hit the number one spot on the Billboard Hot 100 chart in September 1969 and went on to be Billboard's number one "Hot 100 Single" of that year). Competing animation studio Hanna-Barbera Productions contacted Archie Comics about possibly adapting another of its properties into a similar show. Archie Comics offering to redevelop the Josie series into one about a teenage music band, and allowing Hanna-Barbera to adapt it into a music-based Saturday morning show. The show aired 16 episodes during the 1970-71 television season. In the 1972-73 television season, the show was re-conceptualized as Josie and the Pussycats in Outer Space and aired another 16 episodes. After the show's cancellation, Josie and the Pussycats made a final appearance in a guest shot on the September 22, 1973 episode of The New Scooby-Doo Movies, "The Haunted Showboat".

In the wake of the 2001 feature film, DiC Entertainment, a company with extensive ties to Archie Comics, announced it had bought merchandising and adaptation rights to the characters and was planning to create a cartoon with them. However, production on this was never completed. Not much is known about what this series could have been, but had it been completed, it would have been co-produced and distributed with Riverdale Productions, a joint venture of Archie and MultiModal Media Group.

==== Live-action ====
Josie and the Pussycats appear in Riverdale on The CW. They are high school students who are dedicated to perfecting the "Pussycat" brand. Ashleigh Murray portrays Josephine "Josie" McCoy, named for Josephine Baker, whose father is a jazz musician and wishes his daughter played more serious music. Her mother is Riverdale's mayor. Asha Bromfield and Hayley Law portray Melody Valentine and Valerie Brown, respectively.

Josie would later emigrate to the spin-off series Katy Keene as an adult, with Murray reprising her role. In this, Josie finds two new Pussycats, Cricket O'dell and Trula Twyst portrayed by Azriel Patricia and Emily Rafala.
