= Rudy Lapick =

American comic book artist (1926–2004)

- Born: November 17, 1926 The Bronx, New York City,
- Died: February 28, 2004 (aged 77) Yonkers, New York
- Area: Inker
- Notable works: Archie Comics
- Spouse: Mary Zema

Original art panels of Archie Andrews and Veronica Lodge, "The Reformer", in Betty and Veronica #157 (1969). Penciled by Dan DeCarlo and inked by frequent collaborator Lapick.

Rudolph E. "Rudy" Lapick (17 November 1926 – 27 February 2004) was an American comic book artist who worked as an inker for Archie Comics for many years. He was nominated for a Shazam Award in 1974 for Best Inker (humor).

== Biography ==
Rudy Lapick was born in The Bronx, New York City, New York, the son of Rudolph and Florence Lapick. He had a brother, John, and a sister, Gioia. After he married Mary Zema on May 30, 1948, the couple moved to nearby Yonkers, New York. They had a daughter, Lorraine and two sons, Rudy Jr. and John.

Lapick became a staff inker at Timely Comics, the 1940s forerunner of Marvel Comics. In the 1950s, his work included issues of G.I. Joe for Ziff-Davis Comics. He was Dan DeCarlo's primary inker for the majority of DeCarlo's career both at Timely and for decades at Archie.

Lapick maintained a long friendship with fellow Timely/Atlas artist Gene Colan, dating to their working together in the Timely art room starting in 1946. Almost five decades later, he inked some of Colan's late-career work at Archie Comics.

He was living in Yonkers at the time of his death.
