= Josie and the Pussycats (TV series) =

American animated television series (1970–1972)

- Also known as: Josie and the Pussycats in Outer Space
- Genre: Comedy; Mystery; Musical
- Created by: Dan DeCarlo; Richard Goldwater
- Based on: Josie and the Pussycats by: Dan DeCarlo
- Developed by: Joe Ruby; Ken Spears; Bill Lutz; Art Davis; Brad Case
- Directed by: William Hanna; Joseph Barbera
- Voices of: Janet Waldo; Sherry Alberoni; Casey Kasem; Jackie Joseph; Jerry Dexter; Barbara Pariot; Don Messick; Cathy Dougher; Cherie Moor; Patrice Holloway
- Theme music composer: Hoyt Curtin; William Hanna; Joseph Barbera
- Composer: Ted Nichols
- Country of origin: United States
- Original language: English
- No. of seasons: 2
- No. of episodes: 32

Production
- Producers: William Hanna; Joseph Barbera
- Running time: 30 minutes
- Production companies: Hanna-Barbera Productions; Archie Comics

Original release
- Network: CBS
- Release: September 12, 1970 – December 23, 1972

Josie and the Pussycats (formatted as Josie and the Pussy Cats in the opening titles) is an American animated television series based upon the Archie Comics comic book series of the same name created by Dan DeCarlo. Produced for Saturday morning television by Hanna-Barbera Productions, 16 episodes of Josie and the Pussycats aired on CBS from September 12, 1970 to December 23, 1972.

In 1972, the show was re-conceptualized into Josie and the Pussycats in Outer Space, 16 episodes of which aired on CBS during the 1972–73 season and were rerun the following season until January 1974. Reruns of the original series alternated between CBS, ABC, and NBC from 1974 through 1976. This brought its national Saturday morning TV run on three networks to six years.

Josie and the Pussycats featured a teenage all-girl pop band that toured the world with their entourage, getting mixed up in strange adventures, spy capers, and mysteries. The group consisted of level-headed lead singer, songwriter and guitarist Josie, intelligent tambourinist Valerie, and air-headed blonde drummer Melody. Other characters included their cowardly manager Alexander Cabot III, his conniving sister Alexandra, her cat Sebastian, and muscular roadie Alan.

The show, more similar to Scooby-Doo, Where Are You! than the original Josie comic book, is remembered for its music, the girls' leopard print leotards (replete with "long tails and ears for hats", as the theme song states), and for featuring Valerie as the first regularly appearing female black character in a Saturday morning cartoon show. Each episode featured a Josie and the Pussycats song played over a chase scene, which, similarly to The Monkees, featured the group running after and away from a selection of haplessly villainous characters.

== Series overview ==
Josie and the Pussycats debuted on the CBS Saturday morning lineup on September 12, 1970, with the episode "The Nemo's a No-No Affair". The animated version of Josie was an amalgam of plot devices, villain types, settings, moods, and tones from other Hanna-Barbera shows such as Scooby-Doo, Where Are You!, Jonny Quest, Space Ghost, and Shazzan.

Like Scooby-Doo, Where Are You!, Josie and the Pussycats was originally broadcast with a laugh track. Later home video and DVD releases omit the laugh track. Cartoon Network and Boomerang, however, have aired the show in its original broadcast format with the laugh track intact.

=== Plot ===
Each episode found the Pussycats and crew en route to perform a gig or record a song in some exotic location where, somehow, often due to something Alexandra did, they became mixed up in an adventure. The antagonist was always a diabolical mad scientist, spy, or criminal who wanted to take over the world using some high-tech device. The Pussycats usually found themselves in possession of the plans for an invention, an item of interest to the villains, a secret spy message, etc., and the villains chased them to retrieve it. Eventually, the Pussycats would ruin the villain's plans, resulting in a final chase sequence set to a Pussycats song. With the villain captured, the Pussycats would return to their gig or recording session, and the final gag was always one of Alexandra's failed attempts to interfere with the Pussycats' performance or steal Alan away from Josie.

== Characters ==
- Josephine "Josie" McCoy (voiced by Janet Waldo, singing voice provided by Kathleen Dougherty) – The red-headed lead singer, songwriter, guitarist, and leader of the band. Josie shares an attraction with Alan, the road manager. During the 1970s, the character was known as Josie James. (Judy Waithe was originally cast but replaced before the show debuted, as her readings of the Josie and the Pussycats-hosted In the Know interstitials were not to CBS's liking; she is incorrectly credited in some copies of the episodes.)
- Valerie Brown (voiced by Barbara Pariot, singing voice provided by Patrice Holloway) – The band's bassist and backup singer; most often shown playing tambourines. The voice of reason in the group, Valerie is highly intelligent and a mechanical wizard. During the 1970s, the character was known as Valerie Smith.
- Melody Valentine (voiced by Jackie Joseph, singing voice provided by Cheryl Ladd as "Cherie Moor") – The band's drummer and backup singer and a stereotypical dumb blonde. What Melody lacks in intellect she makes up for with her perpetual sweetness and optimism. Her ears wiggle whenever there is danger. During the 1970s, the character was known as Melody Jones.
- Alan M. Mayberry (voiced by Jerry Dexter) – The group's tall, blond, and muscular roadie and Josie's love interest.
- Alexander "Alex" Cabot III (voiced by Casey Kasem) – The group's band manager, highly identifiable by his brightly colored mod wardrobe, sunglasses, and idiotic promotion schemes. He is the twin brother of Alexandra. Alex is an admitted coward but is good-hearted in sharp contrast to his sister Alexandra. Alex and Valerie have a slight attraction to one another at times. He also seems to be attracted to Melody. Alex physically resembles Shaggy Rogers in Scooby-Doo. In The New Scooby-Doo Movies crossover episode "The Haunted Showboat", Casey Kasem voices both Alex Cabot and Shaggy Rogers.
- Alexandra Cabot (voiced by Sherry Alberoni) – The only girl who is not a Pussycat band member of Josie's trio, but is still a member of the group. She is identified by her long black pony-tailed hair with a white streak through the center of it, similar to a skunk or a polecat (her bizarre appearance is an unexplained holdover from the comic book, where Alexandra had very limited supernatural powers, and this was the mark of the witch). Intelligent but also selfish, generally mean-tempered, grouchy and bullying, Alexandra is Alex's twin sister. She appears to have no identifiable role with the band, nor any reason for associating with it, other than the fact that she is Alex's sister and ally who tries to be the leader. She is constantly bitter and jealous of the band's success without her, believing that she should be "the real star of the band" and that the band's name should be "Alexandra's Cool-Time Cats". She constantly plots to steal the spotlight (and Alan's affections) from Josie, only to have every scheme fail in humiliating fashion. She can be a good dancer. Despite her jealousy, she remains very loyal and does care for the group. She will usually fight with them against villains, using her brash personality to intimidate the opposition. Alexandra frequently saves the lives of her teammates, frequently rescuing the clueless Melody from falling into a villainous trap. Alexandra usually rivals Josie over their shared love interest Alan. She tries to steal Alan from Josie, but her plans consistently backfire. Alexandra is the only character who "breaks the fourth wall" and addresses the audience in soliloquy fashion, often in jealousy over Josie.
- Sebastian Cabot (voiced by Don Messick) – Alexandra's snickering cat, whose black and white fur resembles Alexandra's hair and whose utterances sound the same as another Messick-voiced character, Muttley, but he also serves as the loyal pet sidekick of the group (in one episode he uses his sense of smell to track the rest of the group like a dog). He enjoys being mean and sometimes appears to go to the enemy's side, but usually only to trick the villain so he can have a chance to help the group escape. He sometimes uses his claws to pick locks. Alexandra sometimes recruits Sebastian to pull dirty tricks on Josie, but even these tricks usually backfire. Sebastian occasionally "breaks the fourth wall" and snickers to the audience. In The New Scooby-Doo Movies crossover episode "The Haunted Showboat", Messick voiced both Sebastian and Scooby-Doo at the same time. Sebastian's odd nature is a holdover from the comic book where he was a witch's familiar, possessed by the mind of a powerful warlock ancestor of Alexandra. He has the same name as a 20th-century character actor and a 15th-16th century naval explorer.
- Bleep (voiced by Don Messick) – Bleep appears only in Josie and the Pussycats in Outer Space. He is Melody's blue fluffy pet alien with pink extremities and makes a "bleep" sound (thus his name) which only Melody can understand. Bleep can also generate invisible sound waves from his mouth and eyes.

== Production and development ==
=== Origins ===
During the 1968-69 television season, the first Archie-based Saturday morning cartoon, The Archie Show, was a huge success, not only in the ratings on CBS, but also on the Billboard charts: The Archies' song "Sugar, Sugar" hit the #1 spot on the Billboard charts in September 1969, becoming the number one song of the year. Animation studio Hanna-Barbera Productions wanted to duplicate the success their competitors Filmation were having with The Archie Show. After a failed attempt at developing a teenage-music-band show of their own called Mysteries Five (which eventually became Scooby-Doo, Where are You!), they decided to go to the source and contacted Archie Comics about possibly adapting one of their remaining properties into a show similar to The Archie Show. Archie and Hanna-Barbera collaborated to adapt Archie's Josie comic book into a music-based property about a teenage music band, adding new characters (Alan M. and Valerie) while dismissing others.

A scene from episode #14, "Spy School Spoof". From left to right: Melody, Josie, Valerie, Alan, Alexandra and Alexander.

=== The music ===
In preparation for the upcoming cartoon series, Hanna-Barbera began working on putting together a real-life Josie and the Pussycats girl group, who would provide the singing voices of the girls in the cartoons and also record an album of songs to be used both as radio singles and in the TV series.

The Josie and the Pussycats recordings were produced by La La Productions, run by Danny Janssen and Bobby Young (a pseudonym for Bob Engemann of The Lettermen vocal group). They held a talent search to find three girls who would match the three girls in the comic book in both looks and singing ability; early plans, which did not come to fruition, called for a live-action Pussycats segment at the end of each episode. After interviewing over 500 finalists, settled upon casting Kathleen Dougherty (Cathy Dougher) as Josie, Cherie Moor (later known as Cheryl Ladd) as Melody, and Patrice Holloway as Valerie.

According to Danny Janssen's recollections in his liner notes for the Rhino compilation CD, when he submitted his suggested studio singers, he was unaware that all three characters in the Archie comic book were caucasian. But Hanna-Barbera's art and animation elements were already in production, so there was concern about going back and changing the character—not because of race but because of time, budget, and most of all, approvals. Janssen said that he could not return to Patrice Holloway and take her out of the trio so his only alternative was to leave the project. "They were very nice about it," Janssen said, but they agreed that he could happily return for another project in the future. However, in the meantime, Hanna-Barbera, which would not have made such a change in the midst of production without consulting with Archie Comics (who controlled the characters), CBS (who approved the series), and Kellogg's (the sponsor), did indeed replace Pepper with a new character named Valerie. Pepper disappeared from the comic book, and African-American Valerie took her place in December 1969. The timeline of her debut in the comic book bears out the production of the series and the development of the merchandise design guides, which include Valerie. Hanna-Barbera initiated this in order to replace Pepper with African-American Valerie to keep Patrice Holloway. They then hired African-American Barbara Pariot as Valerie's speaking voice. Danny Janssen wasn't aware that this had happened until weeks later when he was brought back as the music producer and made the records. The Valerie character was the first black female character on a regular Saturday morning cartoon series. The Hardy Boys drummer Pete Jones had been the first black male to appear on Saturday mornings a year earlier, but Pete's voice was not spoken by an African-American. Hanna-Barbera did cast Valerie's speaking voice accordingly and Danny Janssen cast her singing voice, setting the historic precedent.

Of the songs that were broadcast, Patrice Holloway sang lead on the series' theme song, "You've Come A Long Way, Baby", "Voodoo", "It's All Right With Me", "The Handclapping Song", "Stop, Look And Listen", "Clock on the Wall" and "Every Beat of My Heart". Holloway was the primary lead vocalist on "Roadrunner" which also features verses sung by Kathleen Dougherty and Cheryl Ladd. Ladd sang lead on "Inside, Outside, Upside-Down", "Dream Maker", "I Wanna Make You Happy", "The Time To Love", "I Love You Too Much", "Lie! Lie! Lie!" and "Dreaming". According to songwriter/vocal arranger Sue Sheridan (known as Sue Steward at the time), Dougherty felt she was stronger on harmony than lead and ceded her spotlight to Ladd. Essentially then, Josie was the group leader but Valerie and Melody provided the trio with its singing voices.

=== Theme song ===
The show's theme song, titled "Josie and the Pussycats", was written by Hoyt Curtin, William Hanna (under the pseudonym "Denby Williams") and Joseph Barbera (under the pseudonym "Joseph Roland"). The theme song was based on melodies from an incidental tune that had been played on various Hanna-Barbera cartoons since The Jetsons. A soundtrack album of songs from the series was released in 1970 on Capitol/EMI Records.

A cover of "Josie and the Pussycats" performed by Juliana Hatfield and Tanya Donelly is included on the 1995 tribute album Saturday Morning: Cartoons' Greatest Hits, produced by Ralph Sall on MCA Records. The theme song was also covered on the soundtrack of the 2001 live-action film based on the comic book series.

== Josie and the Pussycats in Outer Space ==
Title card to Josie and the Pussycats in Outer Space.

In September 1972, a sequel spin-off series titled Josie and the Pussycats in Outer Space debuted on CBS. This version of the series launched the characters into outer space; the opening credits sequence shows the group taking a promotional photo at the launch site of a new spaceship. (It is unclear whether they were the ship's assigned crew, or simply publicity guests.) A jealous Alexandra, elbowing the cast aside in order to steal the spotlight from Josie yet again, stumbles and causes a domino effect so that they are all jerked inside, accidentally triggering the launch sequence, which sends all into deep space. Val knows how to pilot the vessel. Every episode centered on the Pussycats encountering a strange new world where they would encounter and often be captured by various aliens-of-the-week before escaping and attempting to return to Earth. No matter what the scenario, Alexandra remains determined to stop Josie from getting too close to Alan. A typical ending for an episode is that they meet a wise benevolent person who reprograms the ship's course for Earth, only to have a clumsy action by Alexandra (or occasionally Melody or Alex) set the ship on the wrong trajectory once again.

Musical numbers and chaotic chase sequences were set to 10 all original newly recorded songs specifically written as "featured performances" with Music & Lyrics by ASCAP songwriter Richard Moyers, who was signed for the sequel by Roger Karshner, Hanna-Barbera's new "Musical Development Director" and Produced by Hanna-Barbera's in-house Musical Director Hoyt Curtin. All recordings were done by studio professionals known as "The Wrecking Crew" at Whitney Recording Studios, Glendale, CA for this spin-off as with the original. Josie and the Pussycats in Outer Space also added the character of Bleep, a pet-sized fluffy alien adopted by Melody, who was the only one who could understand the creature's language (he only says "Bleep" repeatedly) and numerous other alien animals encountered. Bleep and Sebastian fluctuate between being competitors or good friends throughout the series, with Don Messick providing the non-verbal chattering of both pets.

The series' premise is similar to Lost in Space (1965–1968), particularly that series' third season where the formerly marooned ship was allowed to visit a new planet each week a la Star Trek. Alexandra's role parallels that of Dr. Zachary Smith – both are unpleasant characters, often at odds with the rest of the crew, whose blunders caused the initial loss in space. Bleep is similar to Debbie the Bloop, Penny Robinson's pet who was played by a chimpanzee in a costume.

The 16 episodes of Josie and the Pussycats in Outer Space were re-run for the 1973–1974 season until January 26, 1974, when CBS canceled it and ordered no more new Josie episodes from Hanna-Barbera. Josie and the Pussycats in Outer Space contained a laugh track as well, but it utilized an inferior version created by the studio.

== Episodes ==
=== Josie and the Pussycats (1970–1971) ===
No.	Title	Original release date	Prod. code
1	"The Nemo's a No No Affair"	September 12, 1970	51-1
The gang run afoul of a modern-day descendant of Captain Nemo while on their way to a musical gig on Pago Pago Island. Loosely based on Jules Verne's 1870 novel Twenty Thousand Leagues Under the Seas. Song: "Roadrunner"
2	"A Greenthumb Is Not a Goldfinger"	September 19, 1970	51-2
Thanks to Alexandra's scheming, the gang, thinking that they are headed to Nashville for a gig, end up in the Amazon rainforest, where they encounter an evil botanist named Dr. Greenthumb, his man-eating plants, and a tribe of headhunters. The villain's name is suggestive of James Bond villains Dr. Julius No and Auric Goldfinger. Song: "Voodoo"
3	"The Secret Six Secret"	September 26, 1970	51-3
While in Bombay, the gang mistakenly enters the lair of a sinister organization called the Secret Six which plans to replace an Indian leader with one of their number with the use of a potion that can manipulate a person's facial structure. Song: "Lie Lie Lie"
4	"Swap Plot Flop"	October 3, 1970	51-6
Valerie bears an uncanny resemblance to an abducted Arabian princess and thus becomes involved in a plan to catch her kidnapper, a hypnotist known as the Evil Eye. The premise is similar to Anthony Hope's The Prisoner of Zenda. Songs: "It's All Right With Me" (excerpt), "Hand Clapping Song"
5	"The Midas Mix-Up"	October 10, 1970	51-5
While skiing in the Alps, the gang ends up in the clutches of a baron calling himself Dr. Midas who plans to destroy the world's entire supply of gold unless half of it is given to him. Broadly based on the James Bond movies Goldfinger and On Her Majesty's Secret Service. Song: "The Time To Love"
6	"X Marks the Spot"	October 17, 1970	51-7
During a trip to England, the gang meets Professor Isaac Belfour who has created an invisibility potion. He is being pursued by his former lab assistant Mr. X who stole the potion and used it on himself to embark on a life of crime. Mr. X and his henchmen are intent on stopping Professor Belfour from developing an antidote to the potion that would restore Mr. X to a visible state. Loosely based on H. G. Wells' The Invisible Man. Song: "Stop, Look and Listen"
7	"Chili Today and Hot Tamale"	October 24, 1970	51-4
While in Mexico, nuclear capsules are slipped into Melody's bass drum during a fuel stop. When the henchmen for a power-mad nuclear engineer called the Scorpion snatch the drum, the gang rush to recover the instrument and become entangled in the Scorpion's scheme to rule the world with his weather control device. Songs: "It's Alright With Me", "The Hand Clapping Song" (excerpt)
8	"Never Mind a Master Mind"	October 31, 1970	51-8
Melody innocently buys new shoes in Holland unaware that they contain a message for a spy sent to stop the faceless Master Mind, a master of disguise. Contrary to her usual comic relief role, Alexandra uses the anti-gravity ray gun to save her friends from the Master Mind. Loosely based on Mission Impossible. Song: "Clock on the Wall"
9	"Plateau of the Apes Plot"	November 7, 1970	51-9
The gang's plane, heading for Puerto Rico, makes an emergency landing in a Caribbean jungle inhabited by dinosaurs and bipedal apes, all of which are under the control of a mad scientist named Dr. Madro who can change humans into animals. Alexander is turned into a chicken and then an ape while Sebastian the cat is turned into a bulldog. Mixes elements of H. G. Wells' The Island of Doctor Moreau and Arthur Conan Doyle's The Lost World, with the title referring to Planet of the Apes. Song: "I Love You Too Much"
10	"Strangemoon Over Miami"	November 14, 1970	51-11
The gang's hot air balloon in Miami is set loose and ends up on the island of Dr. Strangemoon, a mad scientist who plans to launch missiles that will devastate the Earth's atmosphere. The title is a mashup of Moon Over Miami and Dr. Strangelove, with no particular similarity in the plot. Songs: "Dreaming" (excerpt), "Inside, Outside, Upside Down"
11	"All Wong in Hong Kong"	November 21, 1970	51-10
Melody comes into possession of a strange ancient coin during the gang's trip to Hong Kong. The Serpent, a mad toymaker who resembles yellow peril stock characters such as Fu Manchu, pursues the gang in order to obtain the coin, which is the key to his plans for the conquest of Asia. Song: "You've Come a Long Way Baby"
12	"The Melody Memory Mix-Up"	November 28, 1970	51-13
While on a relaxing gig in Hawaii, the gang is pursued by a Zeppelin bourne criminal known as the Hawk when confidential information is transferred from a tape recorder to Melody's memory. Songs: "Dream Maker" (excerpt), "Roadrunner"
13	"The Great Pussycat Chase"	December 5, 1970	51-12
While in Paris, the gang is entrusted with a mysterious black box by a sleeping gassed agent and are told to protect it from a mysterious criminal called the Shadow and his organization. When the Shadow discovers that the gang has the box, he and his henchmen embark on an around-the-world chase to steal it from them in the style of Around the World in Eighty Days and The Great Race. In an odd moment, Alexandra appears to have mind control powers over a polar bear, possibly a reference to her comic book origin story. Melody displays a rare moment of literacy by jokingly connecting the Shadow to the iconic radio character of the same name. Songs: "Together" (excerpt), "Inside, Outside, Upside Down"
14	"Spy School Spoof"	December 12, 1970	51-14
The Pussycats are in New York City for a recording session. A mix-up in the mail brings them plans for a top secret device that can deactivate the world's technology. The Pussycats' sheet music, meanwhile, ends up in the clutches of a mad criminal called the Laser, who is determined to get his hands on the plans that the gang now have. It is up to the gang to hitchhike to the Laser's hideout in the Grand Canyon and foil his plans. Songs: "Inside, Outside, Upside Down" (excerpt), "It's Alright With Me"
15	"The Jumpin' Jupiter Affair"	December 19, 1970	51-15
The gang encounters an alien spaceship in Peru led by a ruthless alien named Zor, who forces the gang and the local natives to work in a diamond mine. Songs: "I Wanna Make You Happy" (excerpt), "You've Come a Long Way, Baby"
16	"Don't Count on a Countess"	January 2, 1971	51-16
It seems that the Pussycats have actually got the big gig when the gang is invited by an eccentric Countess to play a private performance on her secluded Mediterranean island, where they discover too late that the invitation was a ruse to obtain young test subjects for her rapid aging mist. Songs: "Every Beat of My Heart" (excerpt), "Clock on the Wall"

=== Josie and the Pussycats in Outer Space (1972) ===
No.	Title	Original release date	Prod. code
JPO–1	"Where's Josie?"	September 9, 1972	60-1
Finding themselves lost in space aboard a spaceship, the Pussycats land on the planetoid Zelc and encounter a creature named Bleep. At the same time, Josie is kidnapped by an alien named Karnak, a deposed ruler who is intent on reconquering the populace of Zelc. Song: "DOUBLE TROUBLE" – Music & Lyrics: Richard Moyers (ASCAP)
JPO–2	"Make Way for the Multi-Men"	September 16, 1972	60-2
The Pussycats land on a planet of cat people and soon learn from their king Kator that their queen Felina is being held prisoner by the power-mad robot Menton, who possesses a weapon that can create nearly-endless duplicates of himself or others. The Pussycats save the queen from the robot's clutches. Song: "LOVE SONG OF THE UNIVERSE" – Music & Lyrics: Richard Moyers (ASCAP)
JPO–3	"The Sleeping Planet"	September 23, 1972	60-3
The Pussycats land on the planet Arcobia where they try to help expose the corrupt Prime Minister Rulo as the true thief of a device that is very important to the planet while contending with his Canyonian allies. Song: "DID YOU HAVE YOURSELF A DAY" – Music & Lyrics: Richard Moyers (ASCAP)
JPO–4	"Alien Alan"	September 30, 1972	60-4
The Pussycats encounter a planet where the populace depends heavily on the power of magnets. Alan is captured and brainwashed to serve the planet's ruler Magno. Song: "DANCE THE FRAIDS AWAY" – Music & Lyrics: Richard Moyers (ASCAP)
JPO–5	"The Water Planet"	October 7, 1972	60-5
On a water planet, the Pussycats' ship is hijacked by locals led by Aquar intent on conquering Earth with a water-controlling device. Song: "OPEN UP YOUR EYES" – Music & Lyrics: Richard Moyers (ASCAP)
JPO–6	"The Sun Haters"	October 14, 1972	60-6
Josie and the gang encounter a race of giants on a planet that has developed a fluid capable of extinguishing the Sun completely. Their leader Orco and his henchmen Lujak plan to use the Pussycats' spaceship as a means of delivering the extinguisher. Song: "UNIVERSAL BROTHERHOOD" – Music & Lyrics: Richard Moyers (ASCAP)
JPO–7	"The Mini-Man Menace"	October 21, 1972	60-7
The Pussycats are shanghaied by robots and forced to journey to a planet ruled by an ambitious villain called the Mighty Mitchko. Contains imagery suggestive of Jonathan Swift's Gulliver's Travels. Song: "DOUBLE TROUBLE" – Music & Lyrics: Richard Moyers (ASCAP)
JPO–8	"The Space Pirates"	October 28, 1972	60-8
The Pussycats' ship is seized by robot space pirates under the command of Captain Braggo. Braggo intends to use the ship as a vessel in his pirate fleet to loot and plunder ships and planets that he comes across. Song: "LOVE SONG OF THE UNIVERSE" – Music & Lyrics: Richard Moyers (ASCAP)
JPO–9	"Anything You Can Zoo"	November 4, 1972	60-9
The ship containing the Pussycats lands on the planet Kalex. Josie and the gang quickly find themselves unwilling participants in a circus run by the frog-men of Kalex. Their ruler Throg plans an attack on Earth. Song: "DID YOU HAVE YOURSELF A DAY" – Music & Lyrics: Richard Moyers (ASCAP)
JPO–10	"Now You See Them, Now You Don't"	November 11, 1972	60-10
The Pussycats encounter aliens who can seemingly become invisible at will. Josie and the others are baffled as to how to outsmart and escape the aliens, until Melody inadvertently acquires the power of invisibility. Song: "UNIVERSAL BROTHERHOOD" – Music & Lyrics: Richard Moyers (ASCAP)
JPO–11	"The Four-Eyed Dragon of Cygnon"	November 18, 1972	60-11
The Pussycats encounter two aliens, who attempt to convince Josie and the gang into helping them against a dragon that is menacing them. The Pussycats must figure out who is the true menace before it is too late. Contains some similarities to a subplot in L. Frank Baum's The Wonderful Wizard of Oz. Song: "SMILE WHEN IT HURTS" – Music & Lyrics: Richard Moyers (ASCAP)
JPO–12	"The Forward Backward People of Xarock"	November 25, 1972	60-12
Josie and the gang meet Tyran, whose weapon causes everything it zaps to go backwards. Song: "YOU NEED LOVE" – Music & Lyrics: Richard Moyers (ASCAP)
JPO–13	"The Hollow Planet"	December 2, 1972	60-13
Aliens that reside on a ship that resembles a planet plan to enslave others by using a ray that turns its victims into children. Song: "JOIN THE PARTY" – Music & Lyrics: Richard Moyers (ASCAP)
JPO–14	"All Hail Goddess Melody"	December 9, 1972	60-14
On the planet Gezzner, Melody is found to resemble the goddess that the planet's populace worships. Song: "YOUR OWN BACK YARD" – Music & Lyrics: Richard Moyers (ASCAP)
JPO–15	"Outer Space Ark"	December 16, 1972	60-15
The group thwarts a power plot by the mad scientist Arkapus, who, by means of a sonic transmitter, has trained the local animals for conquest. Contains imagery suggestive of the Phantom of the Opera. Song: "OPEN UP YOUR EYES" – Music & Lyrics: Richard Moyers (ASCAP)
JPO–16	"Warrior Women of Amazonia"	December 23, 1972	60-16
Josie and the gang are captured by Merla and her Amazon warriors on a planet where the women rule and the men are their slaves. After freeing themselves from captivity, the boys find their escape complicated by the fact that Merla has brainwashed the girls into joining her man-hating forces. Song: "UNIVERSAL BROTHERHOOD" – Music & Lyrics: Richard Moyers (ASCAP)

== Voices ==
- Don Messick – Sebastian the Cat, Bleep, Gas Station Attendant, Scorpion's Henchman, Aquar
- Janet Waldo – Josie
  - Cathy Dougher – Josie (singing voice)
- Barbara Pariot – Valerie
  - Patrice Holloway – Valerie (singing voice)
- Jackie Joseph – Melody
  - Cherie Moor – Melody (singing voice)
- Jerry Dexter – Alan, Laser's Henchman
- Casey Kasem – Alexander Cabot III, Delivery Man, Aquar's Henchman
- Sherry Alberoni – Alexandra Cabot

== Home media ==
A VHS videocassette of Josie and the Pussycats in Outer Space containing three episodes was issued by Worldvision Home Video in 1983. A second video cassette, Josie and the Pussycats in Outer Space Volume 2, was released in 1985.

Two VHS volumes of Josie and the Pussycats, each containing four episodes of the original 1970 series, minus the laugh tracks, were released by Warner Home Video (Hanna-Barbera had been sold to Turner Broadcasting in 1991, with Turner merging with Time Warner six years later) on April 10, 2001, to coincide with the release of the live-action film. A Josie in Outer Space episode, "Warrior Women of Amazonia", was featured in a clip/episode collection of Hanna-Barbera on VHS, released in the UK.

A Josie and the Pussycats: The Complete Series two-DVD box set was released in Region 1 (the United States, Canada, and Japan) on September 18, 2007. All 16 episodes, again minus the laugh tracks, were included, as well as a half-hour documentary on the life and career of Dan DeCarlo. The first episode of the series, "The Nemo's A No No Affair", is featured on the DVD compilation Saturday Morning Cartoons: The 1970s Volume 1 released on May 26, 2009.

On October 19, 2010, Warner Archive released Josie and the Pussycats in Outer Space: The Complete Series on DVD in Region 1 as part of their Hanna–Barbera Classics Collection of Manufacture-on-Demand (MOD) releases, available exclusively through Warner's online store and Amazon.

Both Josie and the Pussycats and Josie and the Pussycats in Outer Space were available on the Boomerang and HBO Max streaming services, with the latter featuring the series in remastered HD copies, until they were remove from both apps. Warner Archive released the HD versions of Josie and the Pussycats on Blu-ray on November 3, 2020, and Josie and the Pussycats in Outer Space on April 13, 2021.

DVD name	Ep #	Release date
Josie and the Pussycats: The Complete Series	16	September 18, 2007; June 20, 2017 (re-release); November 3, 2020 (Blu-ray)
Josie and the Pussycats in Outer Space: The Complete Series	16	October 19, 2010; April 13, 2021 (Blu-ray)

== Reception ==
Josie and the Pussycats was named the 100th best animated series by entertainment website IGN, which referred to Josie as an amusing show for the way in which it combined elements from The Archie Show and Scooby-Doo.

== After cancellation ==
Josie and the Pussycats made a final appearance as animated characters in a guest shot on the September 22, 1973, episode of The New Scooby-Doo Movies, "The Haunted Showboat". Early production art for Hanna-Barbera's 1977 "all-star" Battle of the Network Stars spoof Laff-A-Lympics featured Alexandra, Sebastian, Alexander, and Melody among other Hanna-Barbera characters as members of the "Scooby Doobies" team, but legal problems prevented their inclusion in the final program.

In 1976, Rand McNally published a children's book based on the Josie and the Pussycats TV show, Hanna-Barbera's Josie and the Pussycats: The Bag Factory Detour.

The original Josie and the Pussycats series was re-run on NBC Saturday morning for the 1975–1976 season and weekdays in syndication from 1977 to 1982. In the mid-1980s, both series, along with a number of other 1970s Hanna-Barbera cartoons, were on board USA Network's Cartoon Express; they would next appear on Cartoon Network in 1992, where all 32 episodes were run in the same time slot. Both programs, as of March 3, 2014, are in the library of Boomerang (Turner Broadcasting's archive cartoon channel).

== Spin-offs and spoofs ==
In 2001, Cartoon Network began airing a Josie and the Pussycats short called "Musical Evolution" that featured the Pussycats performing their theme song through the various eras of popular music, including pop, disco, punk, Kiss-like heavy metal, country, and electronic dance music. Different animation styles are used for each era. That same year, the characters were adapted into a live action film. The film starred Rachael Leigh Cook as Josie, Tara Reid as Melody, and Rosario Dawson as Valerie.

DIC Entertainment, which had produced cartoon adaptations of Archie properties in the 1980s, the 1990s, and the early-2000s, had originally set out to create a cartoon based on the band (mainly in the wake of the 2001 film), before it was scrapped.

The 2004–2007 Comedy Central animated TV series Drawn Together featured a character named Foxxy Love. An African-American mystery-solving musician, she was a direct parody of the Josie and the Pussycats character Valerie Brown.

Several episodes of Speed Buggy, a later Hanna-Barbera show, had similar plots to some Josie and the Pussycats episodes, specifically the two Josie and the Pussycats episodes "A Greenthumb is Not a Goldfinger" ("Island of the Giant Plants" in Speed Buggy) and "X Marks the Spot" ("Out of Sight" in Speed Buggy), and the Josie and the Pussycats in Outer Space episode "Warrior Women of Amazonia" ("The Hidden Valley of Amazonia" in Speed Buggy).

The ship from Josie and the Pussycats in Outer Space, along with other iconic ships, appears as space debris in the Futurama episode "Mobius Dick".

In 2016, Josie and the Pussycats was rebooted as a comic book. This update features a new version of the origin of the band, where struggling musician Josie joins up with her roommate Melody and Valerie, a veterinarian's assistant, to start the Pussycats, despite the jealousy of Josie's former best friend Alexandra.

The 2017 live-action TV series Riverdale featured Josie and the Pussycats as African-American students at Riverdale High School, portrayed by Ashleigh Murray (Josie), Hayley Law (Valerie) and Asha Bromfield (Melody). Murray later co-starred in the Riverdale spin-off Katy Keene starting in 2020 as an adult Josie, with Lucien Laviscount as Alexander and Camille Hyde as Alexandra.

Bleep appears in Jellystone! voiced by Jim Conroy. He visits Jellystone in "Mr. Flabby Dabby Wabby Jabby" and his self-titled episode. In the latter, Bleep befriended Cindy Bear and is shown to get vicious if given something that has hot sauce on it.

== See also ==
- Josie and the Pussycats (the Archie comic)
- Josie and the Pussycats (the music group put together in conjunction with the show)
- Josie and the Pussycats (the live-action film)
- List of works produced by Hanna-Barbera Productions
- List of Hanna-Barbera characters
