= Grace Kelly (film) =

1983 television film by Anthony Page

- Spanish VHS cover
- Genre: Biography; Drama
- Written by: Cynthia Mandelberg
- Directed by: Anthony Page
- Starring: Cheryl Ladd; Lloyd Bridges; Diane Ladd; Alejandro Rey; Ian McShane
- Music by: John Andrew Tartaglia
- Country of origin: United States
- Original language: English

Production
- Executive producers: Brian Russell; Michael Weisbarth
- Producer: Stanley Chase
- Production locations: Cannes, Alpes-Maritimes, France; Monaco; Long Beach, California
- Cinematography: Woody Omens
- Editors: Gene Foster; Jack Horger
- Running time: 100 minutes
- Production companies: Kota Company Productions; Embassy Television

Original release
- Network: ABC
- Release: February 21, 1983

Grace Kelly (also known as The Grace Kelly Story) is a 1983 American made-for-television biographical film starring Cheryl Ladd as Grace Kelly, Princess of Monaco. The film originally aired on ABC on February 21, 1983.

The producers claimed that Princess Grace assisted for several weeks with the film's pre-production before her unexpected death in 1982.

== Cast ==
- Cheryl Ladd as Grace Kelly
  - Christina Applegate as Young Grace Kelly
- Lloyd Bridges as Jack Kelly
- Diane Ladd as Margaret Kelly
- Alejandro Rey as Oleg Cassini
- Ian McShane as Prince Rainier of Monaco
- Marta DuBois as Rita Gam

== Critical reception ==
The New York Times wrote that Cheryl Ladd "comes reasonably close to being as beautiful as the original," but regretted "the sense of stately awe and suffocating propriety that seeps through the project. Grace Kelly will offend nobody. Unfortunately, it's not likely to interest too many people, either"; Allmovie agreed that the film "tones down the darker aspects of its subject, and the film is infinitely more tasteful than most other TV biographies of the same period, even when dealing with Princess Grace's untimely death"; whereas the Radio Times wrote "There's much that this TV movie glosses over, particularly with regard to her love life, but director Anthony Page successfully conveys the pressures placed on Kelly by her privileged background and her international fame."
