= Think It Over (Cheryl Ladd song) =

Single by Cheryl Ladd

from the album Cheryl Ladd
- B-side: "Here Is a Song"
- Released: July 1978
- Genre: Pop
- Length: 3:29
- Label: Capitol
- Songwriters: Brenda Russell, Brian Russell
- Producer: Gary Klein

Cheryl Ladd singles chronology
"Mamma Don't Be Blue" (1974)	"Think It Over" (1978)	"Good Good Lovin'" (1978)

"Think It Over" is a 1978 song by Cheryl Ladd. It was released as a single from her eponymous debut album. The song was released following the second season of Charlie's Angels, the first in which Ladd was cast.

The song became a top 40 hit in the United States and Canada on both the pop singles charts as well as the Adult Contemporary charts. It had its best showing on the Canadian AC chart, where it peaked at No. 29. The single was also released in the UK, the Netherlands and Japan.

"Think It Over" was Ladd's only song to chart, although another track from the album, her original version of "I'll Never Love This Way Again", became a top 5 hit when covered by Dionne Warwick in 1979.

== Chart history ==
Chart (1978)	Peak position
Canada RPM Top Singles	40
Canada RPM Adult Contemporary	29
US Billboard Hot 100	34
US Billboard Adult Contemporary	44
US Cash Box Top 100	44
