= Archie's Pals 'n' Gals =

Comic book series

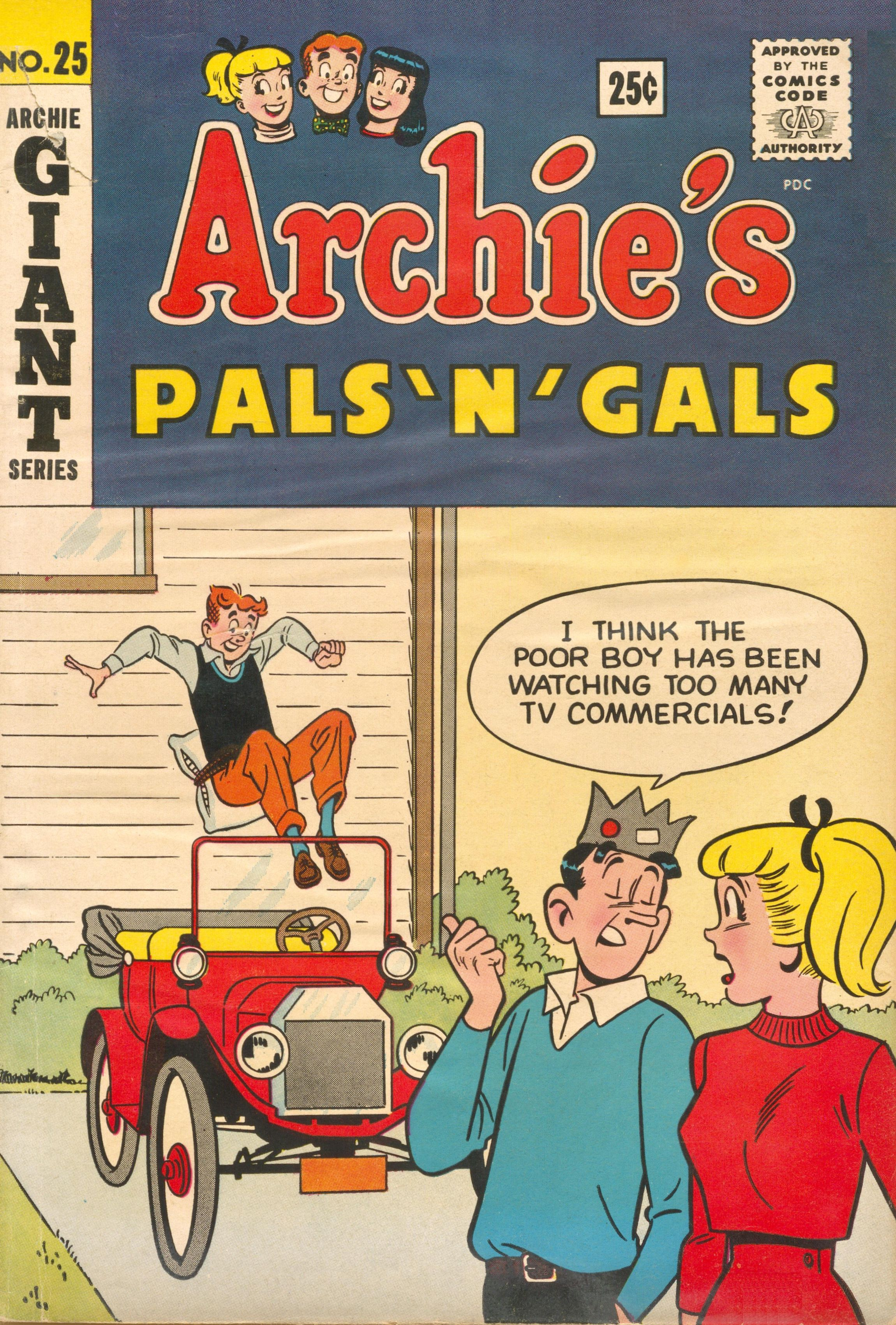
- Cover of Archie's Pals 'n' Gals 25 (Summer 1963)

Publication information
- Publisher: Archie Comics
- Schedule: bimonthly
- Publication date: 1952 – September 1991
- No. of issues: 224
- Main character: Archie gang

Archie's Pals 'n' Gals is a comic book series published by Archie Comics featuring Archie and his friends. It originally ran from 1952 to 1991. The title showcased other members of the Archie gang, such as Betty and Veronica, Jughead and Reggie. It was later brought back in the form of a digest magazine in 1992.

== Publication history ==
The most notable issue was 1962's #23, which featured the second appearance of Josie, Melody and Pepper, a week after the debut of the She's Josie comic book. Josie and Melody would go on to become two-thirds of Josie and the Pussycats in issue #45 of Josie's own title.

In 1992, a year after the 32-page regular-sized comic book was canceled, a new Archie's Pals 'n' Gals Double Digest title was launched, which ran until being canceled in 2011 with issue #146.

== See also ==
- List of Archie Comics Publications
