= Josie and the Pussycats (soundtrack) =

Josie and the Pussycats: Music from the Motion Picture

Soundtrack album by Josie and the Pussycats
- Released: March 27, 2001
- Studios: Brandon's Way (Los Angeles); Tracken Place (Los Angeles); Right Track (New York City); Q Division (Somerville)
- Genres: Pop rock; pop punk; teen pop; alternative rock; power pop
- Length: 37:44
- Labels: Epic; Playtone; SMS
- Producers: Babyface, Adam Schlesinger, Presidential Campaign, Guliano Franco

Professional ratings
Review scores
Source	Rating
AllMusic	4/5 stars

Josie and the Pussycats: Music from the Motion Picture is the soundtrack album to the 2001 film of the same name, starring Rachael Leigh Cook, Rosario Dawson, and Tara Reid. It was released on March 27, 2001, by Playtone, in conjunction with Epic, Riverdale Records and Sony Music Soundtrax.

== Production ==
Producer and singer-songwriter Kenneth "Babyface" Edmonds served as the executive producer of the songs for the film. The soundtrack was released by Sony Music SoundTrax, the day before the film was released. The songs in the film were actually performed with Kay Hanley, singer for Letters to Cleo, as the singing voice of Josie. Rachael Leigh Cook lip synched to the songs in the film. However, Cook, Dawson and Reid provided backup vocals on all of the songs. Despite the film's underperformance at the box office, the soundtrack was well received and was quickly certified as a gold album for selling more than 500,000 copies. The album peaked at No. 16 on the Billboard 200.

In addition to Hanley, other contributors include Bif Naked, Adam Schlesinger (Fountains of Wayne, Ivy), Dave Gibbs and Steve Hurley (Gigolo Aunts), Jason Falkner (Jellyfish), Matthew Sweet, Jane Wiedlin (The Go-Go's), Adam Duritz (Counting Crows), Anna Waronker (That Dog) and Michael Eisenstein (Letters to Cleo).

== Legacy ==
On September 26, 2017, a belated celebration commemorating the movie's 15th anniversary took place at the Ace Hotel in Los Angeles, featuring a screening of the film, a Q&A with writer-director Kaplan and stars Cook, Dawson and Reid, and a set of five songs from the film performed by Hanley and the song's original sessions players, including Schlesinger. The event also marked the debut release of the soundtrack on vinyl by Mondo, featuring a leopard print design, a bonus 7-inch single of the two DuJour songs and a 12-page booklet.

== Track listing ==
No.	Title	Writer(s)	Performed by	Length
1.	"3 Small Words"	Deborah Kaplan; Harry Elfont; Dave Gibbs	Josie and the Pussycats	2:53
2.	"Pretend to Be Nice"	Adam Schlesinger	Josie and the Pussycats	3:50
3.	"Spin Around"	Gibbs; Adam Duritz	Josie and the Pussycats	3:17
4.	"You Don't See Me"	Gibbs; Kaplan; Babyface; Jason Falkner; Steve Hurley; Dee Dee Gipson; Elfont; Jane Wiedlin; Duritz	Josie and the Pussycats	3:43
5.	"You're a Star"	Duritz; Gibbs; Anna Waronker	Josie and the Pussycats	2:06
6.	"Shapeshifter"	Kay Hanley; Michael Eisenstein	Josie and the Pussycats	3:01
7.	"I Wish You Well"	Waronker	Josie and the Pussycats	2:54
8.	"Real Wild Child"	Johnny O'Keefe; Johnny Greenan; Dave Owens	Josie and the Pussycats	1:51
9.	"Come On"	Gibbs; Kaplan; Elfont; Babyface; Falkner; Hurley; Gipson; Wiedlin; Schlesinger; Hanley	Josie and the Pussycats	3:13
10.	"Money (That's What I Want)"	Berry Gordy; Janie Bradford	Josie and the Pussycats	2:28
11.	"DuJour Around the World"	Kaplan; Elfont; Brainz Dimilo; Anthony President	DuJour	2:56
12.	"Backdoor Lover"	Kaplan; Elfont; Dimilo; President; Guliano Franco	DuJour	3:40
13.	"Josie and the Pussycats"	Joseph Barbera; William Hanna; Hoyt Curtin	Josie and the Pussycats	1:43

== Credits ==
Credits adapted from CD liner notes, unless otherwise indicated.

Lead vocalists

- Kay Hanley – Josie
- John Stephan – DuJour
- J'son Thomas – DuJour

Additional musicians

- Rachael Leigh Cook – background vocals
- Rosario Dawson – background vocals
- Tara Reid – background vocals
- Bif Naked – background vocals
- Matthew Sweet – unspecified duties

Technical

- Babyface – producer (tracks 1–5)
- Dave Gibbs – co-producer (tracks 1–5)
- David J. Holman – mixing (tracks 1–10, 13)
- Adam Schlesinger – producer (tracks 6–10, 13)
- Presidential Campaign – producer (tracks 11–12)
- Guliano Franco – producer (track 12)
- Kevin Thomas – mixing (tracks 11–12)
- Paul Boutin – engineer (tracks 1–5, 11–12)
- Edward Quesada – additional vocal recording (tracks 1–5, 11–12)
- Mike Denneen – engineer (tracks 6–10, 13)
- Matthew Ellard – assistant engineer (tracks 6–10, 13)
- Matt Beaudoin – assistant engineer (tracks 6–10, 13)
- Anthony President – additional programming (tracks 11–12)
- Stephen Marcussen – mastering
- Stewart Whitmore – digital editing
- Angie Rubin – music editor
- Jeff Potokar – assistant music editor
- Aimee Macauley – package design

== Charts ==
Weekly chart performance
Chart (2001)	Peak position
US Billboard 200	16

Year-end chart performance
Chart (2001)	Peak position
Canadian Albums (Nielsen SoundScan)	135

== Certifications ==
Region	Certification	Certified units/sales
United States (RIAA)	Gold	500,000^{^}
^{^} Shipments figures based on certification alone.
