= Willie Lumpkin =

Fictional mailman for the Fantastic Four

- Willie Lumpkin as depicted in his debut appearance in Fantastic Four #11 (February 1963). Art by Jack Kirby and Dick Ayers.

Publication information
- Publisher: Marvel Comics
- First appearance: Fantastic Four #11 (February 1963)
- Created by: Stan Lee (writer); Dan DeCarlo (artist)

In-story information
- Full name: William Lemuel Lumpkin
- Supporting character of: Fantastic Four, Spider-Man
- Abilities: Ability to wiggle ears and nose

William Lemuel "Willie" Lumpkin is a fictional supporting character appearing in American comic books published by Marvel Comics. The character is best known as the mailman of the Fantastic Four in their self-titled comic book.

Willie Lumpkin was portrayed by Stan Lee in the 2005 film Fantastic Four.

== Publication history ==
=== Newspaper comic strip ===
Willie Lumpkin in the 1959-61 comic strip. Art by Dan DeCarlo.

The character was originally created for a syndicated daily comic strip by writer Stan Lee and artist Dan DeCarlo. Lee recalled in a 1998 interview that,

Mel Lazarus had done a strip called Miss Peach, which used not panels but one long panel instead. I liked that idea very much, so when Harold Anderson, the head of Publishers Syndicate, asked me to do a strip, I came up with Barney's Beat, which was about a New York City cop and all the characters on his patrol who he'd meet every day and there would be a gag. I did some samples with Dan DeCarlo, and I thought it was wonderful. Harold said it was too "big city-ish" and they're not going to care for it in the small towns because they don't have cops on a beat out there. He wanted something that would appeal to the hinterland, something bucolic. He said, "You know what I want, Stan? I want a mailman! A friendly little mailman in a small town." I don't remember if I came up with the name Lumpkin or he did, but I hated it. I think I came up with the name as a joke and he said, "Yeah, that's it! Good idea!"

Willie Lumpkin drew humor from the people and situations Willie would encounter along his mail delivery route in the small town of Glenville. The daily strip ran from December 1959 to May 6, 1961. A Sunday strip ran through May 28.

=== Marvel Comics ===
Lee then introduced the comic book version of Willie Lumpkin in Fantastic Four #11 (Feb. 1963), featuring art by Jack Kirby. The comic book Lumpkin is depicted as significantly older than in the comic strip, though the character's good nature was retained, as were references to his past as a mail carrier in Glenville, which the comic book placed in Nebraska.

In his first comic book appearance, Lumpkin is represented as having befriended the Fantastic Four, to whom he makes regular fan mail deliveries at their Baxter Building headquarters in New York City. He half-jokingly requests to join the team on the grounds that he has the "power" to wiggle his ears.

Lumpkin appeared in his own solo feature in Marvel Comics Presents #18 (May 1989). In this parody of A Christmas Carol, he is visited by the Ghost of Christmas Past who had intended to haunt cantankerous Spider-Man nemesis J. Jonah Jameson, but could not find his address. The story concludes with the normally amiable postman deciding he hates Christmas.

== Fictional character biography ==
Willie Lumpkin is a mail carrier whose Manhattan route includes the joint home and office of the Fantastic Four. On occasion he falls into the danger that typically surrounds the adventuring heroes. Examples include a story in which he is forced to spend Christmas Eve locked in a closet while the Fantastic Four fight the Super-Skrull, or when he helped to save the team from the Mad Thinker. This incident involved Reed's trust in Lumpkin; he had hired the mailman to manipulate the machinery as part of a safety routine.

Lumpkin briefly dates Peter Parker's Aunt May. When May briefly appears to have died, Lumpkin grieves and is seen to befriend a new companion named Doreen Greenwald.

Lumpkin has since retired, and his niece Wilhemina "Billie" Lumpkin has taken his position as the Fantastic Four's mail carrier.

He was interviewed about the Fantastic Four on the news show Lateline, saying how though the group took on cosmic menaces, they always found time to greet him. Sometime later, the Fantastic Four enter Lumpkin's body in miniature form to remove an otherwise inoperable brain tumor.

Lumpkin was later hired as a biology teacher for the Future Foundation, a school founded by the Fantastic Four.

== Other versions ==
An alternate universe version of William Lumpkin appears in Ultimate Fantastic Four. This version is a government agent for the Baxter Foundation.

== In other media ==
- Willie Lumpkin appears in the Fantastic Four: World's Greatest Heroes episode "My Neighbor was a Skrull", voiced by Colin Murdock.
- Willie Lumpkin appears in Fantastic Four, portrayed by Stan Lee.
- Willie Lumpkin appears in Marvel's Iron Man VR, voiced by Dwight Schultz.
