= Richard Goldwater =

Comic books publisher

- Born: July 25, 1936 New York City
- Died: October 2, 2007 (aged 71) Greenwich, Connecticut
- Area: Publisher
- Notable works: President/Co-Publisher and Editor-in-Chief of Archie Comics

Richard H. Goldwater (July 25, 1936 – October 2, 2007) was an American comic book president and publisher of Archie Comics, co-founded by his father, John L. Goldwater as MLJ Comics.

Goldwater originally joined his father's company after college, working various jobs before becoming editor-in-chief, with the goal to create family friendly comics. During this time Archie introduced Sabrina the Teenage Witch and Josie and the Pussycats, and licensed properties like Teenage Mutant Ninja Turtles and Sonic the Hedgehog.

Goldwater was also a factor in expanding the reach of Archie Comics internationally and translations into animated and live-action series and films.

Goldwater had three daughters, Lisa, Taylor, and Summer. He died of cancer on October 2, 2007, in Greenwich, Connecticut.
