= Cheryl Ladd =

American actress (born 1951)

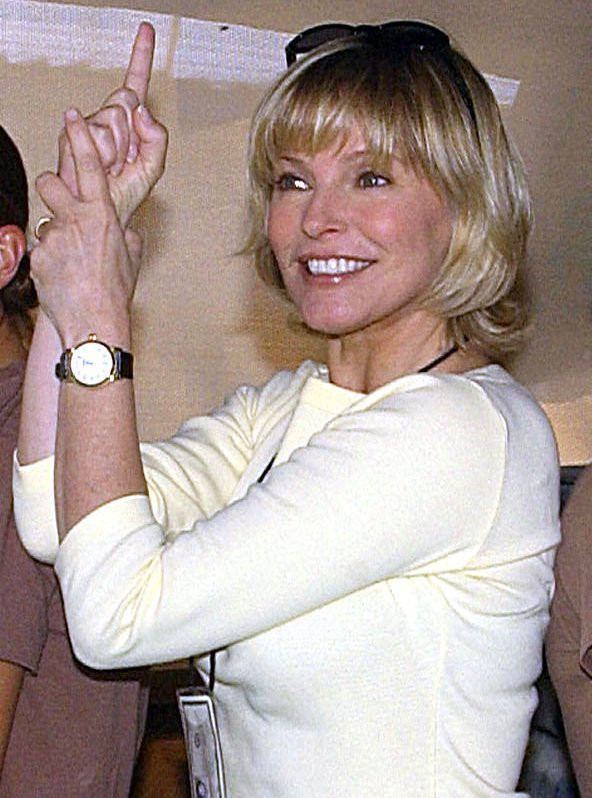
- Born: Cheryl Jean Stoppelmoor; July 12, 1951 (age 75); Huron, South Dakota, U.S.
- Occupations: Actress; singer; author
- Years active: 1970–present
- Known for: Charlie's Angels; Purple Hearts; Millennium; One West Waikiki; Las Vegas; Grace Kelly
- Spouses: David Ladd (m. 1973; div. 1980) Brian Russell (m. 1981)
- Children: 2, including Jordan Ladd

Cheryl Ladd (born Cheryl Jean Stoppelmoor; July 12, 1951) is an American actress, singer, and author best known for her role as Kris Munroe in the ABC television series Charlie's Angels, whose cast she joined in its second season in 1977 to replace Farrah Fawcett-Majors. Ladd remained on the show until its cancellation in 1981. Her film roles include Purple Hearts (1984), Millennium (1989), Lisa (1990), Poison Ivy (1992), Permanent Midnight (1998), and Unforgettable (2017).

== Early life ==
Ladd was born Cheryl Jean Stoppelmoor on July 12, 1951, in Huron, South Dakota, the second daughter of Dolores (née Katz), a waitress, and Marion Stoppelmoor, a railroad engineer, both of German descent. After high school, she traveled with the band The Music Shop and played in venues in the United States Midwest before settling in Los Angeles in 1970.

== Career ==
=== Early roles ===
Ladd originally came to Hollywood to begin a career in music (she was known as "Cherie Moor" when she was the singing voice of Melody on Hanna-Barbera's Josie and the Pussycats animated series, and she also sang on the 1970 album of the same title). However, she soon began to land non-singing roles in commercials and episodic television, including guest appearances on shows such as on The Rookies, The Partridge Family, Police Woman, The Muppet Show, Search and Happy Days.

=== Charlie's Angels (1977–1981) ===
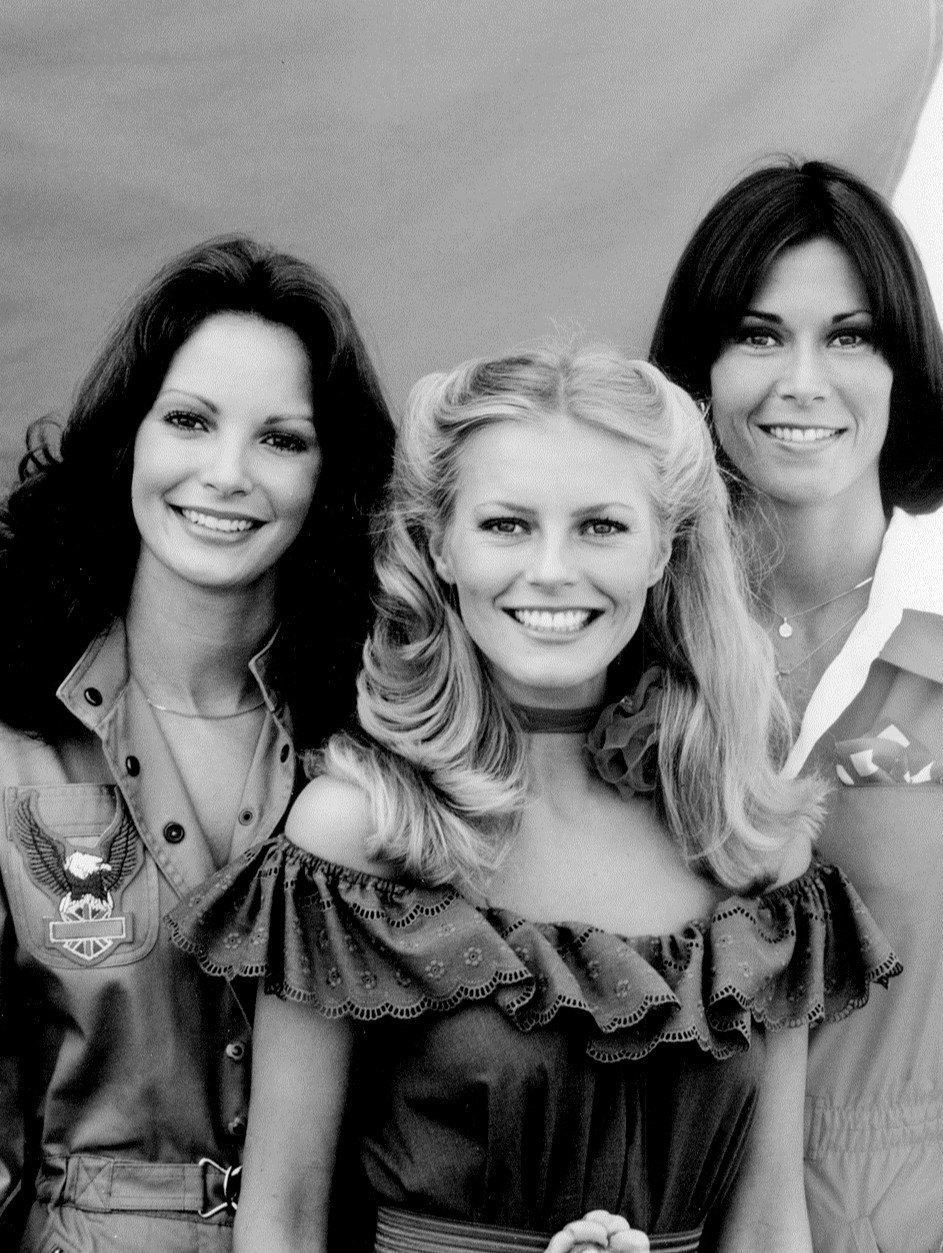
Ladd (middle) in Charlie's Angels

Ladd's big acting break came in 1977, when she was cast in the ABC television series Charlie's Angels, replacing star Farrah Fawcett-Majors, who left the show after only one season to pursue a movie career. To make the transition easier for audiences, producers cast Ladd as Fawcett's character's younger sister, Kris, instantly making her a part of the "Angels family". In the years that followed, replacing Angels this way became standard practice in the show. However, Ladd remained a part of the main cast for four seasons, until the show's cancelation in June 1981.

While starring in the highly rated Charlie's Angels, Ladd took advantage of her newfound popularity to further her musical career, guest starring in musical-comedy variety series and specials, performing the National Anthem at the Super Bowl XIV in January 1980, and releasing three albums. She had a top-40 Billboard Hot 100 single and a gold record.

Ladd co-hosted the 1979 Emmy Awards with Henry Winkler.

=== Later career ===
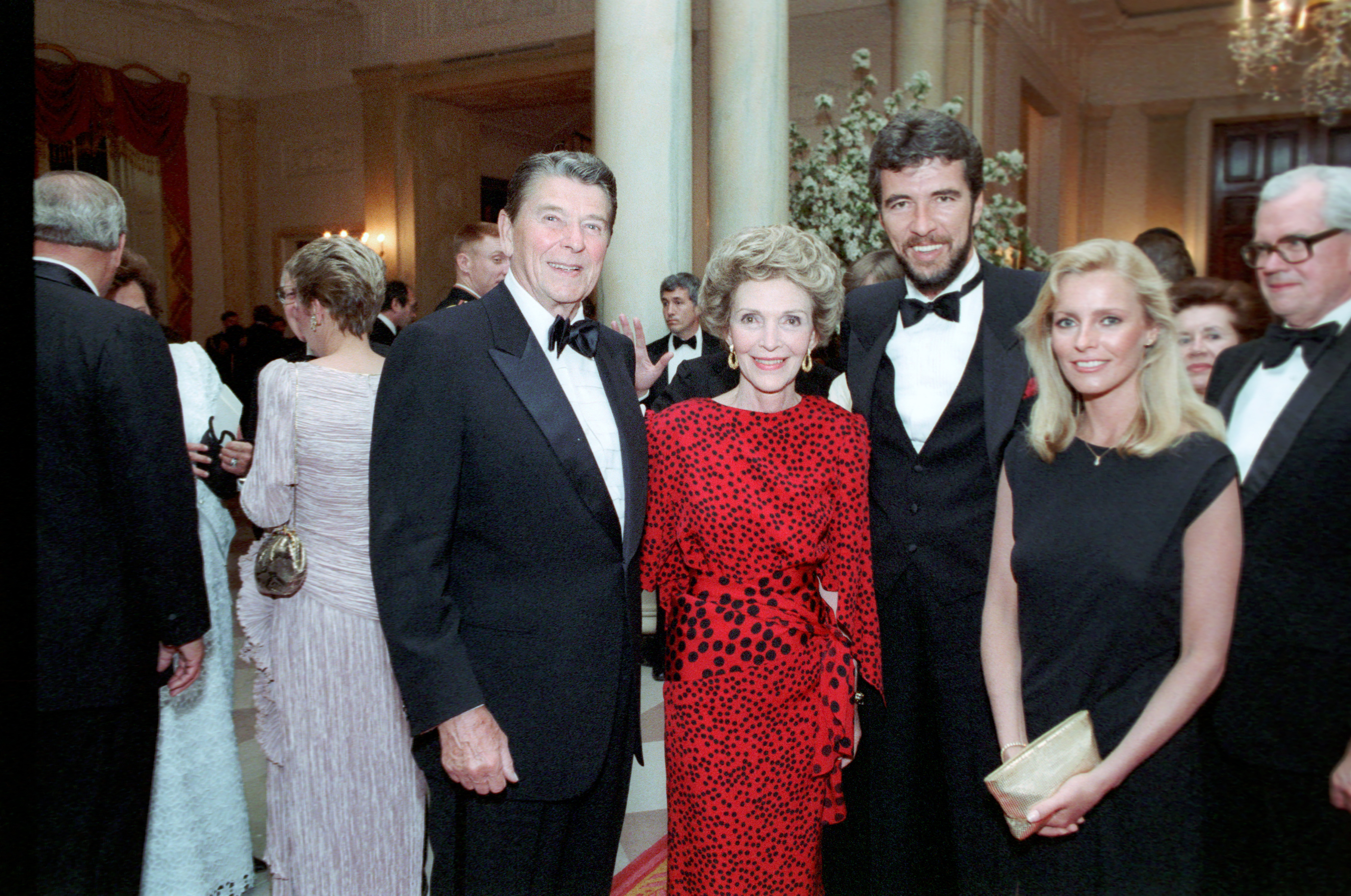
Ladd in 1985 with Ronald and Nancy Reagan

Following Charlie's Angels, Ladd remained a familiar face on television and has starred in more than 30 made-for-television films, including as Grace Kelly, the Philadelphia heiress who became a Hollywood glamour girl and then a European princess, in a biopic that was begun shortly before Kelly's death. She also appeared in a number of feature films, such as Purple Hearts (1984), Millennium (1989), Poison Ivy (1992) (featuring Drew Barrymore, who later starred in the film adaptations of Charlie's Angels) and Permanent Midnight (1998). Ladd had the lead role in the television series One West Waikiki (1994–96) and made guest appearances in other TV shows such as Charmed, Hope and Faith and CSI: Miami. From 2003 until the show's cancellation in 2008 Ladd played Jillian Deline, the wife of the lead character Ed Deline (James Caan), in 29 episodes of the television drama series Las Vegas.

In 1996, Ladd published a children's book titled The Adventures of Little Nettie Windship. In 2005, she published Token Chick: A Woman's Guide to Golfing With the Boys, an autobiographical book which focused on her love of golf. For several years, Ladd hosted a golf tournament sponsored by Buick.

In September 2000, Ladd starred on Broadway, taking over the title role from Bernadette Peters in a revival of Irving Berlin's Annie Get Your Gun. She played the role until January 2001, when Reba McEntire took over.

On April 17, 2010, Ladd — along with her co-angel Jaclyn Smith — accepted the 2010 TV Land Pop Culture Award for Charlie's Angels.

Ladd has continued to appear in a number of TV productions, including the 2011 Hallmark Channel movie Love's Everlasting Courage, guest starring in the NCIS episode "Thirst" (as the love interest of medical examiner Dr. Donald "Ducky" Mallard), and the series Chuck, playing Sarah Walker's mother.

On September 8, 2022, Ladd was announced as a contestant on season 31 of Dancing with the Stars. She was partnered with Louis Van Amstel. They were eliminated in the third week of the competition, placing 14th.

== Personal life ==
Cheryl married fellow actor David Ladd (son of actor Alan Ladd) in 1973. They have a daughter, actress Jordan Ladd. Ladd kept her surname after they divorced in 1980.

Ladd has been married to music producer Brian Russell since 1981 and has a stepdaughter, Lindsay Russell. Ladd is a celebrity ambassador for the child abuse prevention and treatment non-profit Childhelp.

In 2026, during a Charlie's Angels panel at PaleyFest, Ladd revealed she was recovering from breast cancer.

== Filmography ==
=== Film ===
Year	Title	Role	Notes
1971	Chrome and Hot Leather	Kathy	
1974	The Treasure of Jamaica Reef	Zappy	
1982	Now and Forever	Jessie Clarke	
1984	Purple Hearts	Deborah Solomon	
1989	Millennium	Louise Baltimore	
1990	Lisa	Katherine Holland	
1992	Poison Ivy	Georgie Cooper	
1998	Permanent Midnight	Pamela Verlaine	
1999	A Dog of Flanders	Anna Cogez	
2007	Walk Hard: The Dewey Cox Story	Herself	Uncredited
2008	Holiday Baggage	Sarah Murphy	
2012	Santa Paws 2: The Santa Pups	Mrs. Claus	
2014	The Perfect Wave	Mrs. McCormack	
2017	Unforgettable	Helen / Lovey	
2017	Camera Store	Alma	
2017	The Misunderstanding of Carl Jr.	Allyson	Short film
2021	A Cowgirl's Song	Erin Mays	

=== Television ===
Year	Title	Role	Notes
1970–1971	Josie and the Pussycats	Melody Valentine (singing voice)	16 episodes
1972	The Rookies	Girl	Episode: "The Good Die Young"
1972	Alexander Zwo	Nelly	Episode: "Das gestohlene Ich"
1972	The Ken Berry 'Wow' Show	Herself	5 episodes
1972–1973	Search	Amy Love	3 episodes
1973	Harry O	Teenage Girl	Episode: "Such Dust as Dreams Are Made On"
1973	Ironside	Gwen	Episode: "A Game of Showdown"
1973	Satan's School for Girls	Jody Keller	TV movie
1973	The Rookies	Bank Clerk	Episode: "Wheel of Death" (uncredited)
1973	The Partridge Family	Johanna Houser	Episode: "Double Trouble"
1974	The Streets of San Francisco	Susan Ellen Morley	Episode: "Blockade"
1974	Happy Days	Cindy Shea	Episode: "Wish Upon a Star"
1975	Switch	Jill Lorimer	Episode: "Death by Resurrection"
1977	Police Woman	Kate	Episode: "Silky Chamberlain"
1977	Police Story	Buffy	Episode: "Prime Rib"
1977	Code R	Ruth Roberts	Episode: "The Aliens"
1977	The Fantastic Journey	Natica	Episode: "The Innocent Pray"
1977	The San Pedro Beach Bums	Herself	Episode: "Angels and the Bums"
1977–1981	Charlie's Angels	Kris Munroe / Rosemary Garfield	Main role; 87 episodes
1978	The Muppet Show	Guest	Episode: "Cheryl Ladd"
1979	Carol Burnett & Company	Guest	Episode: "Pilot"
1979	The Cheryl Ladd TV Special	Herself	TV special
1979	When She Was Bad	Betina "Teeny" Morgan	TV movie
1980	The Cheryl Ladd Special: Souvenirs	Herself	TV special
1983	Kentucky Woman	Maggie Telford	TV movie
1983	Grace Kelly	Grace Kelly	TV movie
1983	The Hasty Heart	Margaret Parker	TV movie
1985	Romance on the Orient Express	Lily Parker	TV movie
1985	A Death in California	Hope Masters	2 episodes
1986	Crossings	Liane DeVilliers	3 episodes
1987	Deadly Care	Ann Halloran	TV movie
1988	Bluegrass	Maude Sage Breen	TV movie
1989	The Fulfillment of Mary Gray	Mary Gray	TV movie
1990	Jekyll & Hyde	Sara Layton Crawford	TV movie
1990	The Girl Who Came Between Them	Laura Huntoon	TV movie
1990	Crash: The Mystery of Flight 1501	Diane Halstead	TV movie
1991	Changes	Melanie Adams	TV movie
1991	Locked Up: A Mother's Rage	Annie Gallagher	TV movie
1993	Dead Before Dawn	Linda Edelman	TV movie
1993	Broken Promises: Taking Emily Back	Pam Cheney	TV movie
1994	Dancing with Danger	Mary Dannon	TV movie
1996	Kiss and Tell	Jean McAvoy	TV movie
1996	The Haunting of Lisa	Ellen Downey	TV movie
1996	Vows of Deception	Lucinda "Lucy Ann" Michaels	TV movie
1994–1996	One West Waikiki	Dr. Dawn "Holli" Holliday	Main role; 21 episodes
1997	Ink	Mercedes	Episode: "The Black Book"
1998	Every Mother's Worst Fear	Connie Hoagland	TV movie
1998	Perfect Little Angels	Elaine Friedman	TV movie
1999	Jesse	Mary Anne Myers	Episode: "Crazy White Female"
1999	Michael Landon, the Father I Knew	Lynn Noe Landon	TV movie
2000	Two Guys, a Girl and a Pizza Place	Mrs. Berg	2 episodes
2002	Her Best Friend's Husband	Jane Thornton	Television film
2003	Charmed	Doris Bennett	Episode: "The Day the Magic Died"
2003–2008	Las Vegas	Jillian Deline	29 episodes
2004	Hope and Faith	Mary Jo Johnson Fairfield	Episode: "9021-Uh-Oh"
2004	Eve's Christmas	Diane Simon	TV movie
2006	Though None Go with Me	Elizabeth Bishop	TV movie
2009	CSI: Miami	Amanda Collins	Episode: "Bolt Action"
2011	Love's Everlasting Courage	Irene Davis	TV movie
2011	NCIS	Mary Courtney	Episode: "Thirst"
2011	Chuck	Emma	Episode: "Chuck Versus the Baby"
2014	Anger Management	Joanne	Episode: "Charlie Gets Tied Up with a Catholic Girl"
2015	Ray Donovan	Tina Harvey	Episode: "Breakfast of Champions"
2015	Garage Sale Mystery: The Wedding Dress	Helen Whitney Carter	TV movie
2016	The People v. O.J. Simpson: American Crime Story	Linell Shapiro	4 episodes
2017	Ballers	Las Vegas Mayor	Episode: "Bull Rush"
2017	Royal New Year's Eve	Abigail	TV movie
2018	Malibu Dan the Family Man	Pamela Marshall	2 episodes
2018	The Christmas Contract	Renee Guidry	TV movie
2019	Grounded for Christmas	Susan	TV movie
2020	Christmas Unwrapped	Janet Cohen	TV movie
2022	Dancing with the Stars	Contestant	Season 31
2023	A Christmas for the Ages	Joan	TV movie

== Discography ==
=== Studio albums ===
Year	Title	Label	Notes
1970	Josie and the Pussycats	Capitol Records	
1978	Cheryl Ladd	Capitol Records	The album reached number 129 on the US Billboard 200 chart, with the single "Think It Over" peaking at number 34 on the Billboard Hot 100. The track "Walking In The Rain" was used as an ending song for Charlie's Angels in Japan and was released as a single, while the song "I'll Never Love This Way Again" was recorded by Dionne Warwick the following year.
1979	Dance Forever	Capitol Records	The album reached number 179 on the US Billboard 200 chart. The title track was also the closing theme of Charlie's Angels in Japan and was released as an EP, while the song "Where Is Someone To Love Me" was the theme of a Japanese whisky TV commercial featuring Ladd herself.
1981	Take a Chance	Capitol Records	Released in Japan
1982	You Make It Beautiful	Capitol Records	Mini-album released in Tokyo, Japan

=== Singles ===
Issued	Title	Label	Release	Catalogue No.
1970	"Every Beat Of My Heart" b/w "It's All Right With Me" (as a member of Josie and the Pussycats)	Capitol Records	45 rpm	2967
	"Inside, Outside, Upside Down" b/w "A Letter To Mama" (Josie and the Pussycats)	Kellogg's Cereal Promo Record		CP-58
	"Josie" b/w "With Every Beat Of My Heart" (Josie and the Pussycats)	Kellogg's Cereal Promo Record		CP-59
	"Voodoo" b/w "If This Isn't Love" (Josie and the Pussycats)	Kellogg's Cereal Promo Record		CP-60
	"It's Gotta Be Him" b/w "I Wanna Make You Happy" (Josie and the Pussycats)	Kellogg's Cereal Promo Record		CP-61
1971	"Stop Look And Listen" b/w "You've Come A Long Way Baby" (Josie and the Pussycats)	Capitol Records	45 rpm	P-3045
1974	"The Family" b/w "Mamma Don't Be Blue"	Warner Bros	45 rpm	7821
1976	"Country Love" b/w "He's Looking More Everyday Like The Man Who Broke My Heart"	Capitol Records	45 rpm	4215
1978	"Think It Over" b/w "Here Is A Song"	Capitol Records	45 rpm	4599
	"Good Good Lovin'" b/w "Skinnydippin"	Capitol Records	45 rpm	4650
	"Skinnydippin'"(Extended Version) (either side)	Capitol Records	12" Promo Single	SPRO-8894
	"Walking in the Rain" b/w "I'll Come Running"	Capitol Records Japan	45 rpm	ECR-20516
1979	"Missing You" b/w "Thunder In The Distance"	Capitol Records		4698
	"Missing You" (Extended Version) (either side)		12" Promo Single	SPRO-9096
	"Dance Forever" b/w "Missing You"	Capitol Records Japan	45 rpm	ECR-20575
1980	"Where Is Someone To Love Me" b/w "Just Like Old Times"			ECR-17013
1981	"Just Another Lover Tonight" b/w "Television"			ECR-17205
	"Take A Chance" b/w "Victim Of The Circumstance"			ECR-17155
1982	"Can't Say No To You" b/w "You Make It Beautiful" (duet with Frankie Valli)	Capitol Records		B-5115
	"You Make It Beautiful" (duet with Frankie Valli) b/w "Can't Say No To You/Love And Passion/Sakura Sakura"	Capitol Records Japan	EP	ECS-41010
