= Josie and the Pussycats (film) =

2001 film by Deborah Kaplan, Harry Elfont

- Theatrical release poster
- Directed by: Harry Elfont; Deborah Kaplan
- Written by: Harry Elfont; Deborah Kaplan
- Based on: Josie and the Pussycats by Dan DeCarlo, and Archie Comics
- Produced by: Marc Platt; Tracey E. Edmonds; Chuck Grimes; Tony DeRosa-Grund
- Starring: Rachael Leigh Cook; Tara Reid; Rosario Dawson; Alan Cumming; Gabriel Mann; Paulo Costanzo; Missi Pyle; Parker Posey
- Cinematography: Matthew Libatique
- Edited by: Peter Teschner
- Music by: John Frizzell
- Production companies: Metro-Goldwyn-Mayer Pictures; Marc Platt Productions; Riverdale Productions
- Distributed by: Universal Pictures (United States and Canada); 20th Century Fox (International)
- Release date: April 11, 2001 (United States)
- Running time: 98 minutes
- Countries: United States; Canada
- Language: English
- Budget: $22–39 million
- Box office: $14.9 million

Josie and the Pussycats is a 2001 musical comedy film co-produced by Universal Pictures and Metro-Goldwyn-Mayer Pictures. Written and directed by Harry Elfont and Deborah Kaplan, the film is based on both the Archie Comics series and the Hanna-Barbera cartoon of the same name. Filmed entirely in Vancouver, Canada, the film features Rachael Leigh Cook, Tara Reid, and Rosario Dawson as the Pussycats, with Alan Cumming, Parker Posey, Gabriel Mann, Paulo Costanzo, and Missi Pyle in supporting roles.

A girl band, suddenly and inexplicably thrown into the spotlight with a number one hit, find themselves in the middle of a conspiracy to manipulate the public by delivering subliminal messages through pop music.

It was released in the United States on April 11, 2001 by Universal Pictures with the international distribution held by Metro-Goldwyn-Mayer (through 20th Century Fox). The film's soundtrack album was well received, charting at No. 16 on the Billboard 200 and quickly achieving Gold status. However, the film itself received mixed reviews, and was a commercial failure upon its initial release, grossing $14.9 million against a $22–39 million budget. It later gained some success as a cult film.

== Plot ==
Successful boy band DuJour, signed to the pop music record label MegaRecords, are set to perform on a world tour. While on an airplane, they confront MegaRecords label executive Wyatt Frame to express concern about a strange backing track they have discovered on their single "DuJour Around the World". The band members subsequently get into a fight, and Wyatt parachutes out of the jet, leaving it to descend and presumably kill the band.

Landing outside the town of Riverdale, Wyatt searches for a replacement band. He plays DuJour's most recent track at a music store, causing the young crowd to respond to the subliminal messaging, and causes the kidnapping of a "free-thinking" individual who dislikes the music. Wyatt eventually encounters the Pussycats: lead vocalist and guitarist Josie McCoy, drummer Melody Valentine, and bassist and backup vocalist Valerie Brown. The struggling local pop-punk band and their manager, Alexander Cabot, accept Wyatt's offer of a major record deal despite its seeming implausibility, and they fly to New York City. Wyatt renames the band "Josie and the Pussycats", arguing that the public needs to identify with the lead singer.

Meanwhile, MegaRecords CEO Fiona, in an underground meeting with world government representatives, details how the United States government has conspired with the music industry to hide subliminal messages in pop music to indoctrinate teenagers into buying trendy consumer products, thus helping to build a robust economy from the money the teenagers earn from minimum wage jobs such as babysitting. Musicians who discover the hidden messages are made to disappear via staged plane crashes, drug overdoses, controversial scandals, and similar disasters.

Josie and the Pussycats' first single "Pretend to Be Nice" is released and, due to subliminal messaging, instantly becomes successful, soon topping the charts. However, Valerie increasingly resents the attention the label gives Josie rather than the band as a whole, while Melody's behavioral perception makes her suspicious of Fiona and Wyatt. Fiona orders Wyatt to kill Valerie and Melody before they uncover the conspiracy. The Pussycats are supposedly sent to an appearance on MTV's TRL where Carson Daly and his impersonator attempt to kill them with baseball bats, though the girls survive due to their attackers' incompetence.

Rather than allow her to attend a gig by her friend Alan M., claiming it was cancelled, Wyatt instead gives Josie a copy of the group's latest single "You Don't See Me", which contains a subliminal message track designed to brainwash her into desiring a solo career. After arguing with her bandmates to the point where they leave, Josie realizes that the single caused the fight. Josie searches for Valerie and Melody, and with the help of Alexander and his sister, Alexandra, she confirms her suspicions when she uses a mixing board to isolate the subliminal track. However, Fiona and her cronies catch Josie unaware.

MegaRecords has organized a giant pay-per-view concert that will be streamed online, wherein they plan to unleash a major subliminal message via themed cat-ears headsets that viewers must buy to hear the audio. Fiona and Wyatt plan for Josie to perform solo while holding Melody and Valerie hostage, threatening to kill them in a staged car explosion if Josie does not comply. However, the badly injured members of DuJour arrive and thwart the pair's plan. It is revealed that DuJour survived the plane crash by landing the plane in the middle of a Metallica concert, where they were severely assaulted by concertgoers, though Les of the group received fewer injuries due to his familiarity with "Enter Sandman". Les also reveals that they sent Melody a message earlier warning her to "Beware of the Music".

DuJour charges at Fiona, Wyatt, and their security guards only to stumble due to their injuries, giving Josie time to free Melody and Valerie. During the tussle, Fiona accidentally destroys the Megasound 8000, the machine used to generate the subliminal messages, revealing the new message to be one that would make Fiona universally popular. Fiona suffers a breakdown, revealing that her lisp made her a social outcast in high school. Wyatt recognizes Fiona as Lisa "Lithping Litha" Snyder, a former high school classmate, and reveals that his own appearance and British accent are a disguise. He is actually an albino, and his high school nickname was "White Ass Wally".

The government agents colluding with Fiona arrive. However, with the conspiracy exposed, they arrest the pair as scapegoats to cover up their involvement in the scheme. They reveal that they were going to turn on Fiona regardless, as the government intended to abandon the idea of spreading subliminal messages via music, having decided that movies were a far more effective format.

Josie, Valerie, and Melody perform the concert together. Alan M. arrives and confesses his love for Josie, who returns his feelings and kisses him onstage. The concert audience removes their headsets at Josie's suggestion and, able to judge the band on its own merits for the first time, roar their approval.

== Cast ==
- Rachael Leigh Cook as Josie McCoy, the Pussycats' main songwriter, lead singer and guitarist
- Tara Reid as Melody Valentine, the Pussycats' absent-minded blonde drummer and backup singer
- Rosario Dawson as Valerie Brown, the Pussycats' strong-willed and perceptive bassist and backup singer
- Gabriel Mann as Alan M. Mayberry, a folk guitarist and Josie's romantic interest
- Paulo Costanzo as Alexander Cabot, the band's flamboyant and snobby manager
- Missi Pyle as Alexandra Cabot, Alexander's talentless and equally snobby twin sister
- Alan Cumming as Wyatt Frame, a manipulative promoter who recruits and manages young bands for MegaRecords
- Parker Posey as Fiona, MegaRecords CEO who uses subliminal messages to manipulate teens' spending
- Tom Butler as Agent Kelly, the government agent who collaborates with Wyatt and Fiona in the scheme
- Alexander Martin as Les, the leader of the boyband DuJour
- Donald Faison as D.J., a member of DuJour
- Seth Green as Travis, a member of DuJour
- Breckin Meyer as Marco, a member of DuJour
- Serena Altschul as herself
- Carson Daly as himself
- Aries Spears as The Other Carson Daly
- Eugene Levy as himself
- Kenneth "Babyface" Edmonds as The Chief
- Russ Leatherman as Mr. Moviefone
- Harry Elfont (director cameo) as Lex, The Pilot

== Production ==
Maggie Gyllenhaal and Zooey Deschanel both auditioned for the role of Josie, and while Deborah Kaplan and Harry Elfont were enamored with the latter, the studio did not want to cast an unknown. Beyoncé, Aaliyah and Lisa "Left Eye" Lopes auditioned for the role of Valerie. Lopes in particular was very interested in the role and read for it twice. Elfont stated that they wanted someone who was well versed in comedy, noting that Beyoncé was "quiet and shy" and Aaliyah was "serious and thoughtful". Tara Reid did not have to audition for the role of Melody, due to her popularity with the studio after the success of American Pie (1999).

Rachael Leigh Cook later expressed surprise at her casting: "[S]omehow, they gave one of the title roles to me, and I cannot sing at all. I don't play guitar. I have no idea." Cook said the producers considered her for the titular lead in Josie after having remembered Cook from her audition for the lead role in Can't Hardly Wait (1998); both films were co-written and directed by Kaplan and Elfont.

Cook's singing voice in the film was provided by Kay Hanley of the band Letters to Cleo, while backing vocals were provided by Cook, Reid, Rosario Dawson, and Bif Naked. Although the actresses did not perform the instrumentation on the songs themselves, they took music lessons in order to look as if they were playing the songs in the film. The trio went through a "band camp" with the rock band Powder, learning their characters' instruments and rehearsing the songs for several months before filming.

In line with its theme of subliminal advertising, the inordinate degree of product placement in the film constitutes a running gag. Almost every scene features a mention or appearance of one or more famous brands, including Sega and the Dreamcast (Sega's mascot Sonic the Hedgehog also appears in Archie Comics), Motorola, Starbucks, Gatorade, Snapple, Evian, Target, Aquafina, America Online, Pizza Hut, Cartoon Network (which has aired the cartoon series on many occasions), Revlon, Kodak, Puma, Advil, Bounce, and more. None of the advertising was paid promotion by the represented brands; it was inserted voluntarily by the filmmakers.

== Soundtrack ==
Released by Sony Music Soundtrax and Playtone Records on March 27, 2001, Josie and the Pussycats: Music from the Motion Picture was well-received and was certified gold for sales of 500,000 copies. The album peaked at No. 16 on the Billboard 200.

The soundtrack was reissued on vinyl by Mondo in 2017.

== Reception ==
=== Box office ===
The film grossed $14,866,015 at the U.S. box office, less than its production budget, an estimated $22–39 million, resulting in a domestic box office bomb. Kaplan and Elfont both later attributed the film's failure to their lack of consideration of the fact that the film would be marketed to pre-pubescent girls: "I don't know why we weren't thinking that based on the property, we kind of forgot that's who they were going to sell it to, but that's when that panic set in. They're not going to sell it to the people who are going to understand this movie, and the people they're selling it to aren't going to get it. And that's kind of what happened."

=== Critical reception ===
The film received mixed reviews. On Rotten Tomatoes, the film has an approval rating of 54% based on reviews from 126 critics. The site's consensus states: "This live-action update of Josie and the Pussycats offers up bubbly, fluffy fun, but the constant appearance of product placements seems rather hypocritical." On Metacritic, the film scores a 47 out of 100, based on 29 critics, indicating "mixed or average" reviews. Audiences surveyed by CinemaScore gave the film a B grade on a scale from A to F.

Roger Ebert gave the film one-half of a star out of a possible four, commenting that "Josie and the Pussycats are not dumber than the Spice Girls, but they're as dumb as the Spice Girls, which is dumb enough". Ebert had given the British girl group's 1997 feature film Spice World the same rating. Joe Leydon of Variety gave a positive review in which he praised the film's satire, music, and performances. Leydon wrote, "Sensationally exuberant, imaginatively crafted and intoxicatingly clever, Josie and the Pussycats shrewdly recycles a trifling curio of 1970s pop-culture kitsch as the linchpin for a freewheeling, candy-colored swirl of comicbook adventure, girl-power hijinks and prickly satirical barbs." He concluded, "To a degree that recalls the flashy Depression era musicals and the nuclear-nightmare horror shows of the '50s, pic vividly conveys key aspects of the zeitgeist without ever stinting on the crowdpleasing fun and games. It's made for the megaplexes, but it's also one for the time capsule."

=== Proposed animated spin-off ===
A month before the film was released, DiC Entertainment, an animation studio with close ties to Archie Comics, announced it had bought the rights to create an animated series featuring the characters, which it planned on releasing it in the wake of the film. These plans did not come to fruition.

== Legacy and reappraisal ==
In the years subsequent to its initial release, Josie and the Pussycats has been reappraised by critics, and has found success as a cult film. The film has been praised for its satirical take on American pop culture, and for its prescience in satirizing product placement and the corporatization of the music industry. A year after the film's release, Kaplan met U2 frontman Bono, who told her he loved the film. Elfont later elaborated that Bono "totally got it. That was within a year of it coming out, when we still thought people were going to get it and it would open people's eyes up to the music business. ... Until social media, we would always say, 'Well, at least Bono got it.'"

Evaluating the film for The A.V. Club in 2009, Nathan Rabin opined that the film is "funny, sly and sweet" and "a sly, sustained spoof of consumerism", rating the film as a "secret success". Mikael Wood of the Los Angeles Times wrote in 2017 that the film's "sharply satirical vision of the hyper-commercial record industry feels only more relevant."

On September 26, 2017, to commemorate the first vinyl release of the film's soundtrack, Josie and the Pussycats was screened by Alamo Drafthouse at the Ace Hotel in Los Angeles, followed by a Q&A panel with Kaplan, Elfont, Cook, Reid, and Dawson and a performance of songs from the film by Hanley. Additionally, an oral history on the film was featured in The Fader.

Author Maria Lewis released the podcast Josie and the Podcats, which told the story of the film's production and its unlikely road to cult hit, in late 2020.

DuJour appears in the 2021 Robot Chicken special "The Bleepin' Robot Chicken Archie Comics Special", with Green, Meyer and Faison reprising their roles and Cook reprising her role of Josie.

Also in 2021, the book Best Movie Ever: An Oral History of Deborah Kaplan & Harry Elfont's Josie and the Pussycats was released.

== Home media ==
Josie and the Pussycats was released on VHS and DVD by Universal Studios Home Video on August 21, 2001. The film's theatrical PG-13 rating from the MPAA in the United States caused some contention with licenser Archie Comics, and a "Family-Friendly" PG-rated version was released alongside the theatrical version on home media. The "Family-Friendly" version omitted a great deal of profanity and sexual references. The theatrical version was presented in the Widescreen (1.85:1) format while the "Family-Friendly" version was presented in the Full Screen (1.33:1) format.

The movie was released on home media internationally by MGM Home Entertainment (through 20th Century Fox Home Entertainment) on December 17, 2001.

To coincide with the film's 20th anniversary, the film was released on Blu-ray for the first time through Mill Creek Entertainment on September 21, 2021, with most of the extras from the DVD release carried over.
