= Nate Butler (illustrator) =

American cartoonist

- Born: L. Nathan Butler
- Known for: Comics, cartooning, publishing

Nathan L. Butler (born February 1, 1954) is an American cartoonist and writer-illustrator of comics, best known for Christian-themed comics.

== Early career ==
Butler began his full-time professional career at the Albuquerque News/Modern Press organization in 1975, starting in the production department and finishing as advertising art director. He self-published two tabloid-size Desperate Planet comic books in 1976 and 1977. In 1979 Butler opened his own studio and began freelancing.

While operating his business as Captain Renaissance Studios in the early 1980s, Butler worked almost exclusively with New Mexico-area clients such as the Albuquerque Dukes baseball team. He also contributed cartoon panels to the New Mexico Business Journal, Viva New Mexico, and New Mexico Stockman magazines, and taught cartooning and advertising layout at the Academy of Art & Design in Albuquerque. The company name changed to The Nate Butler Studio, incorporating in 1990.

== Mainstream comics ==
The Nate Butler Studio, Inc. operated through at least 1995, producing artwork for Jim Henson Productions, Weekly Reader, Children's Television Workshop, DC Comics, and King Features Syndicate. The company worked on comic books, coloring books, magazines, apparel, and other licensed products utilizing characters such as The Muppets, Popeye, Bugs Bunny, Tiny Toons, Mighty Mouse, Rocky & Bullwinkle, Snuffy Smith, Batman: The Animated Series, The Jetsons, Berenstain Bears, and Tom & Jerry.

His work for Archie Comics includes variously writing, penciling and/or inking stories in roughly a dozen issues of Betty and Me, Archie and Me and other titles in the mid-1980s. He drew and in some cases scripted the first seven issues of Jughead (August 1987 - August 1988), and was the primary writer-penciler, and occasionally inker, of Jughead's Pal Hot Dog (Jan.-Oct. 1990). For Marvel Comics, Butler worked on the licensed series Heathcliff, for the publisher's Star Comics imprint, and inked an issue of Barbie in 1996.

In 1989, Butler attended the 1989 Albuquerque Winter-Con. That same year, he and wife, Susan Butler, co-created a children's book series about baby barnyard animals for the Honey Bear Books imprint of Modern Publishing. In the early 1990s, Butler was one of 125 artists selected to ink Jack Kirby's pencil artwork in the book Heroes and Villains, published by Pure Imagination.

== Christian comics ==
1990 was also the year Butler's studio formed a division called Aida-Zee Comics & Magazines and began to produce Christian comics. The studio's one-shot, Christian color comic Aida-Zee (1990) featured writers and artists including Dick Ayers, Murphy Anderson, Gaylord DuBois, Nestor Redondo, and Kathleen Webb. It contained the last published comic-book work by Golden Age comics professional Jay Disbrow, who inked, colored and lettered the five-page story "Alien Operation". The studio also produced the black=and-white one-shot Paro-Dee for publisher Entity-Parody in 1993, and the 3-D one-shot Behold 3-D in 1996, for the UK's Edge Publishing.

Butler organized the first two Christian comics panels ever held at San Diego Comic-Con in 1992 and 1995, with Nestor Redondo, Stan Lynde, and Kathleen Webb participating. Later Butler took part the Spirituality in Comics panel with Marv Wolfman at Supanova 2007 in Australia, where Butler was a Featured Comic Book Guest along with Stan Lee and others.

Butler's studio also produced the Christian Comics Catalog in 1993 and in 1995. The latter contained Gaylord DuBois' last completed comic-book script.

== Comics ministry and missions work ==
Butler went on to found COMIX35, nonprofit comics-training ministry and consulting company. The company sponsored the First International Christian Comics Training Conference held in Tagaytay, the Philippines, in January 1996.

Butler was an adviser at the start-up of the PowerMark comic-book series. He had been art director on an earlier PowerMark: Creation tract and Jungle Village: The Adventure Begins comic by the same publisher, which were used by missionaries in Southeast Asia.

In the following years Butler led comics seminars and workshops in Australia, Japan, Latin America, Eastern Europe, the US, Québec, and a number of other countries.

In the mid-2000s Butler, briefly re-opened his own sole proprietorship, The Nate Butler Company, to produce comics for ministries. He co-scripted and art directed a graphic novel about Brother Yun entitled Yun: The Illustrated Story of the Heavenly Man for Lion Hudson with black-and-white tonal artwork supplied by former DC Comics artist Rico Rival and Joel Chua. He also produced The Truth For Youth Bible comics for Revival Fires Ministries and the George South wrestling tracts. Then that company was closed.

Butler organized the first International Christian Comics Competition (ICCC) in 2005. The winner in the professional division was Brazilian Sergio Cariello. The amateur winner was José Carlos Gutiérrez. The ICCC2 was held in 2007 and was won by American comics artist Kevin Dzuban.

From around 2004 to 2010, Butler traveled to Japan regularly to assist Shinsei Senkyodan (New Life Ministries) with their Bible manga series: Manga Messiah (Four Gospels), Manga Metamorphosis (Acts/Letters), Manga Mutiny (Genesis to early Exodus), Manga Melech (Exodus through the reign of David), and Manga Messengers (Solomon through the Prophets).

In 2006, Butler partnered with Australian cartoonist and filmmaker Graham Wade and animator Phil Watson to hold a second comics seminar in Sydney, Australia. The next year Butler and Watson held the First Christian Animation Conference in Sydney. In addition to Butler and Watson, the instructors included former Disney animators Matt Baker, Rene Pfitzner, and Ian Harrowell, the Supervising Animator for Simba in The Lion King II: Simba's Pride.

In 2008 Butler and COMIX35 produced the pilot edition of a comic written and drawn by African Christians for an English-speaking African audience. It was published under two titles, The Good Shepherd and Lifegate Comics Africana. This led to a partnership with ministries operating in Francophone (French-speaking) Africa and to co-publishing the comic magazine Éclats: Bandes Dessinées d’Afrique (Bursts: Comics of Africa) with Publications pour la Jeunesse Africaine (PJA), producers of the magazine Jouv’Afrique. COMIX35 has held seminars in Ivory Coast and Cameroon, Africa.

Butler has taught cartooning classes in prisons and has worked to develop inmate-produced comics. He and COMIX35 are members of Operation Starting Line (OSL), which is part of Chuck Colson's Prison Fellowship, and the Coalition of Prison Evangelists (COPE).

In 2013, Butler was chosen to be one of the original 44 EvangelVision bloggers selected by The Billy Graham Center for Evangelism at Wheaton College. That same year, Butler began assisting Kingstone Comics, overseeing artists and colorists on various titles. In 2014, he wrote the Story of Ruth script for the publisher's Kingstone Bible.

== Personal life ==
Born again in 1979, Butler was married to his wife Susan for 30 years until her death in 2011. He married COMIX35 board member Renée Paden Butler in 2012. Butler has three daughters. Butler is famous for always ordering a "yankee" when he eats out, a combination of iced tea and orange juice.
