= Alternate universes in Archie Comics =

This is a list of various alternate universes featuring characters from Archie Comics. Most Archie stories take place within a setting that is gradually updated over the years, and events in one stories are not commonly referenced in others, but those stories remain largely in continuity with each other. However, there have been several series of stories that take place outside of this continuity, featuring alternate versions of the characters in different settings.

A good number of these alternate universe stories — including Archie 3000, Archie's R/C Racers, Dilton's Strange Science, Explorers of the Unknown, Faculty Funnies, Jughead's Pal, Hot Dog, Jughead's Diner, Jughead's Time Police, The Mighty Archie Art Players, and The New Archies — were published in the years 1987–1991.

== Afterlife with Archie ==
Launched in the autumn of 2013 and intended for adult readers, this comic presents Riverdale as ground zero for a zombie apocalypse. Major characters die, while others are presented in ways not typical of other Archie comics.

== Archie 1 ==
Archie 1: The Dawn of Time a.k.a. Archie B.C. (one-shot issue, 2010) — thousands of years before recorded history, the ancestors of Archie and the gang live as cavemen, interacting with dinosaurs and other prehistoric beasts, à la The Flintstones. The characters generally make discoveries that will not be considered significant until centuries later, and there is often irony in the characters denouncing as impractical wheels, houses, and so forth.

== Archie 3000 ==
Archie 3000 (16 issues, May 1989 – July 1991) — the opposite of Archie 1, Archie 3000 displays the (presumed) descendants of Archie and the gang living in the year 3000, which is realized as a 1950s-style art deco world of flying cars, moving sidewalks, domed houses, and gaudy "futuristic" hairstyles and clothes (similar to The Jetsons). Despite the many new breakthroughs in technology, life for Archie 3000 and his friends is often similar to that of their 20th Century counterparts.

== Archie: The Married Life ==
Archie: The Married Life (six issues, 2011–2014) — The Life with Archie comic was revived in 2011 and began telling stories that concerned the characters as young adults. Stories published in alternate months show Archie married to Veronica in one future universe and Betty in another. It is announced that Miss Grundy is deceased, albeit after she married the now-widowed and broken-hearted Mr. Weatherbee. Mr. Lodge behaves in criminally manipulative ways, unlike most Archie universes-especially the one where he supports his handicapped niece Harper Lodge and Dilton Doiley briefly appears, able to teleport between various alternate Archie universes, at one point being met by Little Archie and many other alternate Archies. Kevin Keller goes into his father's line of work by joining the US Army, and Moose Mason is a candidate for the mayoralty of Riverdale. In yet another timeline Archie marries Valerie of Josie & the Pussycats.

== Archie Meets the Punisher ==
Archie Meets the Punisher (one-shot issue, 1994) — In 1994, Archie was the focus of a one-shot comic book intercompany crossover published under two separate covers by Archie Comics and Marvel Comics as Archie Meets the Punisher and The Punisher Meets Archie, respectively. Written by Batton Lash, with artwork by Marvel's John Buscema and Archie's Stan Goldberg, it saw the vigilante Punisher tracking down an Archie doppelganger named "Red" to Riverdale. The comic features cameos from various teen and superhero comics published by both companies, including Josie and the Pussycats, Sabrina, the Teenage Witch, Millie the Model, Katy Keene, Hedy Wolfe, and Patsy Walker. In addition, references are made to That Wilkin Boy, and a passing comment — "So I asked the Doctor if the Hosts of Hoggoth were really hoary" — refers to the perennial catchphrase associated with Doctor Strange.

== Archie's R/C Racers ==
Archie's R/C Racers (10 issues, Sept. 1989 – March 1991) — two teams of Riverdale teenagers, led by Archie and Reggie, travel across the United States racing radio-controlled cars, while foiling the dastardly schemes of the villainous Babette and her bungling but likable henchmen. Archie's team included Jughead, Betty, Moose, Ethel and Dilton. Reggie's team included Veronica, Midge, Chuck, Nancy, and Leroy (though Midge later switched to Archie's team).

== Archie's Super Teens ==
Recurring feature in Life with Archie between 1965 and 1967, and subsequently revisited in Archie's Super Teens (four issues, 1994–1996) — Archie and friends become superheroes and battle a host of bizarre supervillains in a series of tongue-in-cheek adventures. The heroes include:

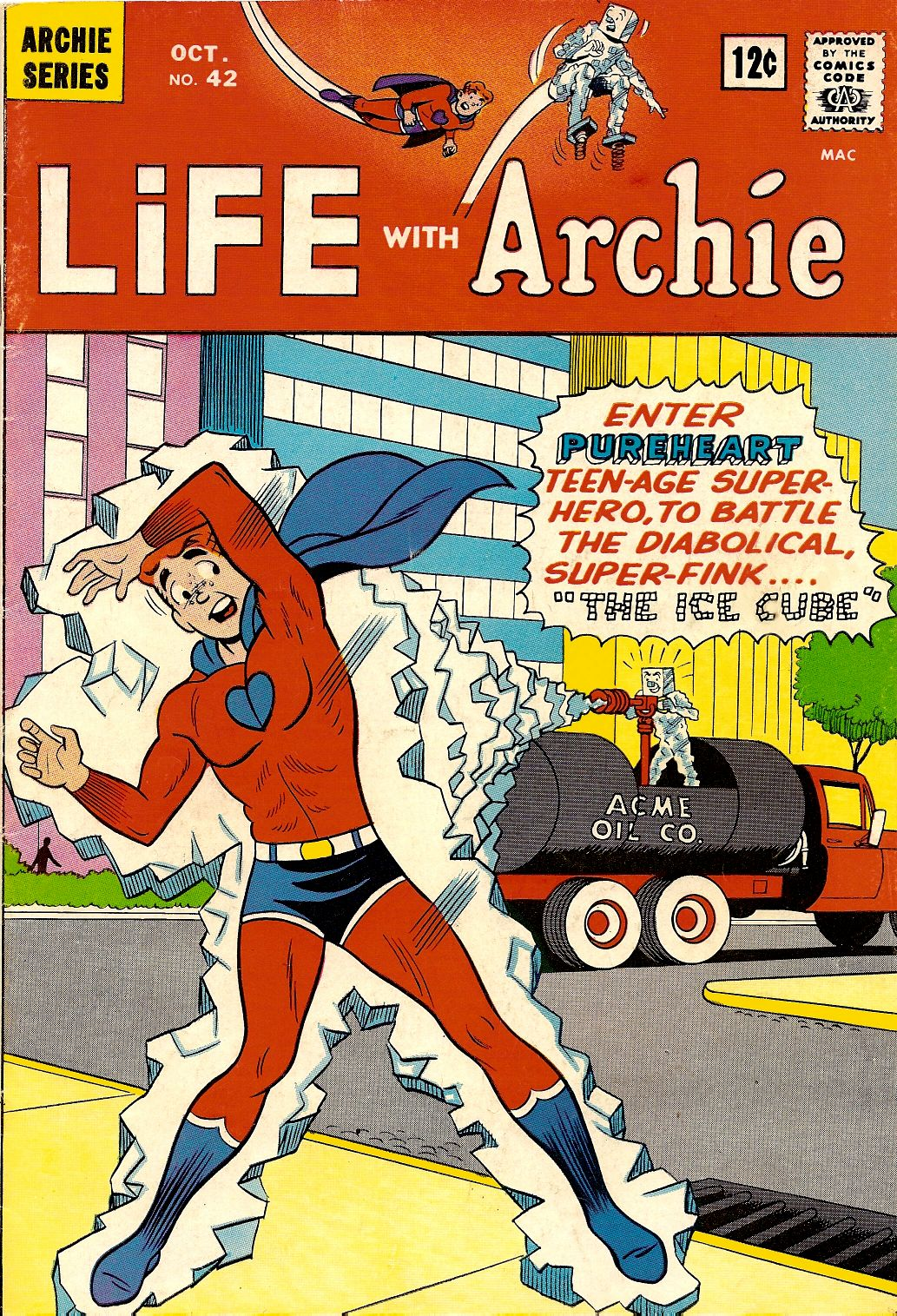
Archie as Pureheart the Powerful on the cover of Life with Archie #42 (Oct. 1965)

- Pureheart the Powerful — born when Archie attempts to tap into the "PH Factor", a superpower only accessed by those pure of heart. Pureheart is super-strong, super-resilient, and can fly using his "jet-boosters". However, his powers only exist as long as his heart is pure, leading to embarrassing situations such as him losing his powers after an appreciative kiss from a damsel in distress, causing the car he was holding up to fall on him.
- Superteen is created by Betty merely twisting her "magic ponytail". Superteen's powers are roughly similar to Pureheart's.
- Captain Hero appears when Jughead recites a magic incantation (similar to Green Lantern's oath): "Teeny weeny magic beanie, / Pointing toward the sky; / Give me muscle, vigor, strength, / Form a super guy!" Unlike Pureheart and Superteen, Captain Hero has an arsenal of bizarre weaponry (like exploding bubble gum), and demonstrates other powers, such as "super-breath" and transforming his head into a steel drill.
- Evilheart the Mighty is Reggie using a variation of the PH Factor, instead using his villainous half to transform into a superhero with Pureheart's powers. So great is Evilheart's villainy that it actually proves a strain to revert to the lesser evil of Reggie Mantle. While Evilheart antagonizes the other superheroes, he will team up with them to battle a common foe.

A 1990s revival of the Super Teens (complete with new stories by famous superhero artists and writers) introduced two new Super Teens:

- Miss Vanity is Veronica, who gained her powers through unknown means (they appear to be stress-related). Her powers are roughly similar to Superteen's, although her outfit is more provocative. She appears to have a "super-sonic" scream, à la the Black Canary.
- Mighty Moose is, naturally, Moose with the gift of flight and augmentations to his already formidable strength.

All of these heroes have inherent "mind foggers" that cause all civilians to forget the Super Teens' secret identities (even the teens themselves, in some cases).

== Archie's Weird Mysteries ==
Archie's Weird Mysteries (twenty-four issues, Feb. 2000–Dec. 2002) – A tie-in to the animated series of the same name. It is centered on Archie and the gang engaging in their usual antics, but with a dash of supernatural elements. The first issue is notable for establishing the premise behind both it and the show, showcasing the lab incident that turned Riverdale into a monster haven, and the origin of Archie's Weird Mystery column. Certain characters who did not make an appearance in the show appear here, such as Mr. Svenson and Cheryl Blossom. A few of the stories even have direct ties to episodes of the show.

Starting with issue #25, the series was renamed Archie's Mysteries (number of issues published: 10 (#25–34), Feb. 2003 – June 2004), severing its ties to the cartoon. In addition to switching its focus to more grounded mysteries, it also depicted the Archie gang as a detective group called the "Teen Scene Investigators" alongside Chuck Clayton, complete with an origin story. The rebranded series was ultimately canceled after nine more issues.

== The Archies ==
Starting in c. 1967, the band The Archies occasionally appeared in madcap adventures seemingly modeled on the popular television show The Monkees. The stories were notable for puns and slapstick humor, which often broke the fourth wall. Followed by The New Archies.

== Betty Cooper, Betty Cooper ==
Betty and Me #79–86 (Oct. 1976–Aug. 1977) — A satire of Mary Hartman, Mary Hartman (itself a parody of soap opera cliches and other such melodramas), this multi-issue epic placed Archie and the gang in one outlandish, tragic situation after another. The characters spoke in hesitant, over-dramatic tones, and the issues had narrations, unlike previous spinoffs. Notable subplots included Jughead being stalked by a homicidal "limping man", Betty being possessed by a Puritan witch named Felicity Goodbody, and Betty's uncle Draco, a vampire (who never appeared in any other stories) being hunted by a count. A running gag involved the mysterious "gypsy lady" who apparently would be able to explain everything, but she failed to show up until the final story (much to the narrator's annoyance) and in truth proved to be no help at all. In typical Archie fashion, the entire story wrapped itself up neatly in the final story, with a happy ending and everything returning to the status quo.

== The Death of Archie ==
In July 2014, Archie was shot dead while saving the life of longtime friend and newly elected U.S. Senator Kevin Keller in the penultimate issue of the alternate future series Life with Archie.

== Dilton's Strange Science ==
Dilton's Strange Science (five issues, May 1989 – May 1990) — Dilton Doiley's solo comic, as he travels through a series of bizarre locales and encounters with alien creatures and monsters. A supporting character in this series was Danni Malloy, a female teen genius serving as both best friend and love interest to Dilton.

== Explorers of the Unknown ==
Explorers of the Unknown (six issues, June 1990 – April 1991) — a parody of Jack Kirby's Challengers of the Unknown, the series cast Archie and friends as an elite group of adventurers who were dispatched to combat mad villains and explore uncharted areas. The characters were:

- Red Andrews, Soldier of Fortune (Archie)
- Wheels Cooper, Mechanic and Pilot (Betty)
- Nitro Mantle, Explosives and Demolition Expert (Reggie)
- Angel Lodge, Martial Arts Expert (Veronica)
- Squint Jones, Daredevil and Escape Artist (Jughead)
- Spike Mason, Stuntman (Moose)
- Gizmo Doiley, Inventor (Dilton)
- F/X Clayton, Illusionist (Chuck) (joined later)
- Blaze Blossom, the team's Washington contact (Cheryl)

The Explorers' adventures were based heavily on classic comic adventures and pulp novels, and paid many homages to Jack Kirby: one adventure pitted the Explorers against the morose Doctor Gloom, an obvious spoof of Doctor Doom.

== Faculty Funnies ==
Faculty Funnies (five issues, June 1989 – May 1990) — Featured the faculty of Riverdale High imbued with superpowers. Professor Flutesnoot invites the other faculty members to an advance viewing of the science fair projects, and Archie's entry explodes, giving the faculty superpowers. Ms. Grundy gains the ability to stretch her right arm as if it were rubber. Coach Clayton gains "super lung" abilities. Mr. Weatherbee is given "trouble-sense" alerting him to nearby danger. Professor Flutesnoot is given the ability to withstand electrical shock. Their powers were reversed in the fifth issue.

== Green Legs and Gams ==
Green Legs and Gams (one issue, Northern Spring 1991) — Cudley the Cowlick drops the Teenage Mutant Ninja Turtles off on the same Earth where Archie Andrews lives, where they assist him in saving Veronica Lodge from kidnappers.

== Hot Dog ==
Jughead's Pal Hot Dog (five issues, Jan.–Oct. 1990) — Jughead's faithful dog Hot Dog received his own five-issue limited series in 1990. In the series, Hot Dog is portrayed in a more human-like fashion than in other depictions. When Jughead's family objects to Hot Dog living indoors because he is covered in dirt, Dilton Doiley builds him a high-tech doghouse full of whimsical inventions. His new home has a robotic butler named Tolbert (nicknamed "Bertie"), and Hot Dog consorts with several other anthropomorphized dogs. The plots often delve into fantasy and science fiction, with Hot Dog and Bertie traveling across dimensions or through time. Artists who contributed to the series included Nate Butler, Doug Crane, and Gene Colan.

== Jughead's Diner ==
Jughead's Diner (seven issues, April 1990 – April 1991) — Takes Jughead to yet another dimension (via a "magic stool"), where he tries to help the bizarre and eclectic patrons of Dinersville keep their property from the clutches of the dastardly real estate agent, "Slimy" Sal Monella. The quirky art style and surrealistic humor were a departure from other Archie titles.

== Jughead's Time Police ==
Jughead's Time Police (six issues, July 1990 – May 1991) — Upon receiving a special beanie from an unknown benefactor, Jughead is recruited into a future scientific agency called the Time Police. The beanie is rather simple to operate; the wearer imagines himself in the time and place pictured; however, it requires concentration, which was always a weak point for Jughead. Joined by Deputy January McAndrews (Archie's descendant from the 29th century and Jughead's secret love interest), Jughead traveled across history, ensuring that it stayed on its proper course. While most issues dealt with history, some focused on science. Paradoxes and existential dilemmas were often plot developments, such as Jughead being warned that Isaac Newton would not hypothesize about physics, only for Jughead to knock an apple out of a tree he is hiding in, thus hitting Newton and inadvertently causing Newton to theorize about gravity. All is well, as Newton's laws were shown to be a basis for time travel. The main villain was the time-traveling sorceress, Morgan Le Fay. Besides the Time Police, another issue had January McAndrews working as a docent in a futuristic museum which has a wing about "The Great Jughead Jones", who, in this universe, is considered a great hero to science.

The series was rebooted in 2019, with Jughead building a time machine to undo the mistakes he has made, forcing January McAndrews to intervene.

== Little Archie ==
Little Archie (180 issues, 1956-Feb. 1983) — This series featured the familiar teenagers as elementary school-age children. It is arguably the most successful of the alternate versions of Archie, and certainly the longest-running. A number of Little Archie series were produced, and new stories are occasionally published even today.

The world of Little Archie is remarkably similar to that of his teenage counterpart. Most of the same characters are featured, albeit usually in younger versions. Miss Grundy and Mr. Weatherbee appear as a teacher and the principal at Riverdale Elementary School. Little Archie is always referred to and addressed as "Little Archie". Although stories featuring one of the other characters would be titled "Little Jughead", "Little Betty" and so on, the characters themselves were always addressed by their regular names. Keeping in mind its younger target audience, Little Archie stories tended to have more educational and moral content than regular Archie stories marketed towards tween readers.

The series introduced a number of characters that had never before existed in the Archie continuity. These included Archie's dog Spotty, Betty's cat Caramel, Betty's older brother Chic and older sister Polly, and new kids Ambrose Pipps and Fangs Fogarty. This made the series more non-canonical. However, around the 1990s, the creators of Archie Comics began to tie Little Archie in to the main continuity by featuring appearances by these characters. Some became recurring characters in the gang's teenage years. Additionally, stories that take place in the main continuity sometimes feature flashbacks to the gang's childhood.

There are a few contradictions between Archie and Little Archie. One is that in Little Archie, the Riverdale High faculty is the Riverdale Elementary faculty. Archie has established that characters like Mr. Weatherbee have worked at Riverdale High too long to have ever been elementary school teachers when the gang was young. Mad Doctor Doom, a villain from the series, later appeared in other Archie titles such as Super Teens, and Sabrina.

In 1991, partly due to declining sales, there was a radical redesign of the Little Archie universe. Renamed as The New Little Archie, it featured the Little Archie characters with contemporary fashions, hairstyles, and sensibilities, and with a more modern-looking art style, yet given the cartoonish look solely to kid characters while keeping the adults in their standard designs. One notable change was that Archie was now addressed merely as "Archie" and no longer "Little Archie". This relaunch was condemned as disrespectful to the original incarnation as the Little Archie universe soon went back to its old style in 1993, resulting that Archie Comics disowned the relaunch as no stories have ever reprinted. Another redesigned Little Archie occurred when it crossed over the Tiny Titans universe in 2011 and received better attention compared to the experience from early 1990s. A picture book of the modified incarnation is currently in the markets.

In 1969, Little Archie inspired a "The Little Archies" segment within the "Funhouse" segments of The Archie Comedy Hour (this "Funhouse" is not the same as the later Archie's Funhouse series).

== The Man from R.I.V.E.R.D.A.L.E. ==
Parodying 1960s spy shows (especially The Man from U.N.C.L.E.), this series portrays Archie and the gang (With their personal names always depicted as acronyms.) as a group of high-tech spies, as part of world defense organization P.O.P. (an acronym for Protect our Planet). Their chief enemy is a counter-group known as C.R.U.S.H. (a spoof on THRUSH, but whose acronym was never explained). Although Reggie, Veronica and Moose were initially cast as C.R.U.S.H. agents, they later became members of P.O.P. All the characters also have undefined acronyms for names (A.R.C.H.I.E., B.E.T.T.Y., etc.). R.I.V.E.R.D.A.L.E. stands for Really Impressive Vast Enterprise for Routing Dangerous Adversaries, Louts, Etc. The stories were often more violent than other series in the franchise with the characters engaged in fisticuffs and would often engage in acts of destruction of enemy facilities in the course of their missions.

The series debuted in Life with Archie #45 (Jan. 1966) and ran through many issues of that title through issue #63 (July 1967), as well as a couple of issues of Archie Giant Series during that same period. Frank Doyle wrote the stories, with Bob White usually providing the art. The Man from R.I.V.E.R.D.A.L.E. series made a cameo in a 2008 issue of Archie and was revived for a four-part series in the same title in 2010. The Man from R.I.V.E.R.D.A.L.E. returned in Jughead #3 in February 2016.

1960s episodes:

- "Archie: The Man from R.I.V.E.R.D.A.L.E." by Frank Doyle, Bill Vigoda, and Mario Aquaviva, in Life with Archie #45 (Jan. 1966)
- "Deadly Delivery!" by Frank Doyle, Bob White, and Marty Epp, in Life with Archie #47 (March 1966)
- "Planetary Peril!" by Frank Doyle, Bob White, and Marty Epp], in Life with Archie #49 (May 1966)
- "Treachery at the Top!" by Frank Doyle, Bill Vigoda, and Marty Epp, in Life with Archie #49 (May 1966)
- "The Nose Knows!" by Frank Doyle, Bob White, and Mario Acquaviva, in Life with Archie #51 (July 1966)
- "Enter Dr. Demon" by Frank Doyle, Bob White, and Mario Acquaviva, in Life with Archie #51 (July 1966)
- "The Whistler vs. the Man from R.I.V.E.R.D.A.L.E." by Frank Doyle and Bob White, in Life with Archie #52 (Aug. 1966)
- "Smoke! Gets in Your Eyes!" by Frank Doyle, Bill Vigoda, and Marty Epp, in Life with Archie #52 (Aug. 1966)
- "P.O.P. Plays Post Office" by Frank Doyle, Bob White, and Mario Acquaviva, in Life with Archie #53 (Sept. 1966)
- "The Image Maker" by Frank Doyle, Bill Vigoda, and Marty Epp, in Life with Archie #53 (Sept. 1966)
- "Undercurrent!" by Frank Doyle, Bob White, and Mario Acquaviva, in Life with Archie #54 (Oct. 1966)
- "Play Deadly" by Frank Doyle and Bill Vigoda, in Life with Archie #55 (Nov. 1966)
- "The Thought Control Caper!" by Frank Doyle, Bob White, and Jon D'Agostino, in Life with Archie #56 (Dec. 1966)
- "Flame of Fear!" (Betty as The Girl from R.I.V.E.R.D.A.L.E.), by Frank Doyle, Bob White, and Jon D'Agostino, in Life with Archie #56 (Dec. 1966)
- "The Clip Pressing Affair" in Archie Giant Series #143 (Dec. 1966)
- "Drums of Despair" by Frank Doyle, Bob White, Jon D'Agostino, in Life with Archie #57 (Jan. 1967)
- "The Christmas Crush" by Frank Doyle and Dan DeCarlo, in Archie Giant Series #144 (Jan. 1967)
- "Sands of Doom" (Betty as the Girl From R.I.V.E.R.D.A.L.E.), in Life with Archie #58 (Feb. 1967)
- "Beastly Bowman!" by Frank Doyle, Bob White, and Jon D'Agostino, in Life with Archie #59 (March 1967)
- "Double Agent" by Frank Doyle, Bob White, and Jon D'Agostino, in Life with Archie #60 (April 1967)
- "The Flamethrower Returns" by Frank Doyle, Bob White, and Jon D'Agostino, in Life with Archie #61 (May 1967)
- "The Fairy Tale Terror!" by Frank Doyle, Bob White, and Mario Acquaviva, in Life With Archie #62 (June 1967)
- "The Poet of Peril!" by Frank Doyle, Bob White, and Rudy Lapick, in Life With Archie #63 (July 1967)
- "A Henry Brewster Thriller" by Bob Powell, in Henry Brewster #7 (Sept. 1967)
- "Cool Cats Courageous" by Bob Powell, in Henry Brewster #7 (Sept. 1967)

21st century episodes:

- "The Summer Before: Freshman Year Part 1 of 5" by Batton Lash, Bill Galvan, and Bob Smith, in Archie #587 (Sept. 2008)
- "The Blackest (and Bluest) Day" by Tom DeFalco, Fernando Ruiz, and Rich Koslowski, in Archie #610 (Aug. 2010)
- "R.I.V.E.R.D.A.L.E. Dissembled!" by Tom DeFalco, Fernando Ruiz, and Rich Koslowski, in Archie #611 (Oct. 2010)
- "The Crisis at Riverdale High" by Tom DeFalco, Fernando Ruiz, and Rich Koslowski, in Archie #612 (Oct. 2010)
- "The Walking Dazed" by Tom DeFalco, Fernando Ruiz, and Rich Koslowski, in Archie #613 (Nov. 2010)
- "The Man from R.I.V.E.R.D.A.L.E." by Chip Zdarsky and Erica Henderson, in Jughead #3 (Feb. 2016)

== The Mighty Archie Art Players ==
- Reggie and Me #68 (Jan. 1974)
- Laugh Comics (vol. 2) #2–29 (Aug. 1987–Aug. 1991)
- Mighty Archie Art Players: Free Comic Book Day Edition (May 2009)

This series used a similar concept to DC Comics' Elseworlds. The familiar characters are put in entirely different times, places, and/or scenarios (a different one for each story). In some stories, the characters play themselves — or at least who they would be if they lived in another setting. In other stories, they retain their personalities but play characters that are not themselves (often in a parody of a well-known story). The story begins with a title card showing which Archie character plays whom.

== The New Archies ==
The New Archies (22 issues, Nov. 1987 – May 1990) — A comics adaptation of the animated series The New Archies. Recasting Archie and the gang as tweens rather than teenagers or young children, The New Archies offered radically redesigned versions of the Archie gang, with contemporary (for the time) clothing and hairstyles. Eugene essentially served as a replacement for Dilton, and had a girlfriend named Amani. As with most redesigns of classic characters, the New Archies did not last long.

== Veronica's Passport ==
Veronica's Passport (six issues, Nov. 1992–Oct. 1997) — In this series, primarily scripted by Kathleen Webb, Veronica traveled to faraway places all around the world (a different place for each story). Often, she gets wrapped up in a mystery or adventure and is the one who solves it. Along the way, she and the reader learn much about the place's history and culture. Most stories feature a local boy that she falls for, but he never appears in another story. A recurring character that Veronica often runs into on her travels is a rich woman known as Lady Smitty, who serves as a foil for Veronica. The stories, for the most part, originated in an earlier series titled Veronica In... (insert travel destination of the month).

== Archie Meets Riverdale ==
In the 2022 series Archie Meets Riverdale, a rift in the multiverse connects the classic Riverdale universe with a darker, more complex version inhabited by their gritty counterparts. This anomaly occurs when Jughead Jones accidentally tampers with an ancient artifact tied to the fabric of reality, allowing the two dimensions to collide. Archie and his friends from the classic universe, used to their wholesome and carefree lives, are thrust into a world where secrets, danger, and corruption define the lives of their counterparts. Meanwhile, the hardened versions of Archie, Betty, Veronica, and Jughead from Riverdale are equally bewildered by the simplicity and optimism of their classic counterparts. As the boundaries between the worlds begin to dissolve, the merging realities threaten to collapse both universes. Through combined efforts, the two versions of Jughead uncover that returning the artifact to its rightful place can restore balance. Both Archies ultimately work together to seal the rift, preserving the integrity of their respective worlds.

== Archie is Mr. Justice ==
In the 2025 series Archie is Mr. Justice, Archie Andrews is a teenage superhero who takes on the persona Mr. Justice to fight for his hometown Riverdale, which in this universe is a large city as opposed to a small town. Archie's best friend Jughead helps guide Archie as he strives to undo the damage caused by the greedy Hiram Lodge, who has transformed the peaceful town into a luxury city that pushes out families in favor of big businesses. As Archie's heroic efforts gain attention, things become complicated when he crosses paths with Hiram's daughter, Veronica Lodge, who in this universe goes by the alter ego Visionary. As Archie continues his fight, the stakes grow higher, and Archie is torn between his love for Betty Cooper and his responsibilities to the town. With great powers come difficult choices, and Archie must confront whether his drive to do what’s right will be enough to bring about a prosperous future for Riverdale, or if his heart will ultimately guide his decisions.
