= Love Showdown =

Archie Comics story arc

- Cover of Love Showdown Collection (1994), trade paperback collected edition, art by Dan DeCarlo
- Publisher: Archie Comics
- Publication date: November – December 1994
- Genre: Humor/comedy
Title(s)
Archie #429
Betty #19
Betty and Veronica #82
Veronica #39
- Main character(s): Archie Andrews; Betty Cooper; Veronica Lodge; Cheryl Blossom

"Love Showdown" is a four-part comic book story arc, first published in 1994, featuring the characters from Archie Comics. Publicized as a possible resolution to the decades-long love triangle between Archie Andrews and his longtime sweethearts Betty Cooper and Veronica Lodge, Love Showdown received more publicity than any other event in Archie Comics history. The story, written by Bill Golliher and Dan Parent, was originally published in Archie #429, Betty #19, Betty and Veronica #82, and Veronica #39.

The storyline concluded with Archie choosing neither Betty nor Veronica, but rather Cheryl Blossom. Blossom was then an obscure character, having made some sporadic appearances in the series in the mid-1980s. The arc contributed to Blossom's notoriety as a notable Archie Comics character, resulting in having her spun off into her own mini-series after the arc's conclusion.

The storyline was also collected in trade paperback form, one of Archie Comics' first attempts in compilation reprints.

== Plot ==
=== Chapter 1 ===
When Betty and Jughead see Archie acting all lovesick they think Veronica got to him, but when she arrives she denies even seeing him today. They decide to investigate and discover that some girl has written a letter to him. They try to find out who it is, but the letter is blown away by the wind and after running all over Riverdale it is burned in a fire. The girls then demand Archie to tell them who wrote the letter, but he has his father take him away by telling him to clean out the garage to keep them in suspense. Later, Reggie tricks both girls that the other one wrote the letter to Archie and before he can tell them who really wrote the letter they stop him. They then end their friendship and both decide to get Archie for herself.

=== Chapter 2 ===
Betty decides to get rid of all the pictures she has of her and Veronica and gives back all the clothes she borrowed. Seeing her upset, Mr. Cooper gives her two tickets to the Lodge's Foundation Summer Charity Dance next week and advises her to invite Archie. Betty calls Archie to invite him to the dance, and he accepts. She even decides to help fix his car to prove she is more handy to have around then Veronica. While working on the car, Veronica shows up for her date with Archie for the Lodge's Foundation Summer Charity Dance, and tells Betty she got tickets with the wrong date. After finishing fixing Archie's car, Betty goes to Pop Tate's and thanks to Jughead she learns that Veronica purposely had the false tickets made. Upon realizing this, Betty decides to crash the dance.

=== Chapter 3 ===
While dancing with Archie, Veronica learns that Betty has come to the dance and is getting a lot of attention thanks to her dress. After Betty upstages Veronica due to her dance moves, Veronica decides she has to find new ways to get Archie's attention. She tries to make muffins for him, but they are so hard they break one of his teeth. Upon losing Archie to Betty again, Veronica begins to lose confidence in herself. Then, Reggie appears and she accepts his offers to help her get her edge back.

=== Chapter 4 ===
While working with Reggie, Veronica gets so mad at him she throws a book at him. Reggie then tells her that she has gotten her edge back because he pushed her too far and then tells her to watch a video to learn new dance moves to dance circles around Betty. After memorizing all the moves on the tape, goes to Pop Tate's Veronica tells Betty that Mrs. Johnson's cat is stuck up in a tree to get her away from Archie. When Betty leaves, Veronica dances with Archie until he couldn't dance anymore. After Betty returns, the girls decide to have a super soakers duel at Pickens Park tomorrow and the winner gets Archie to herself. During the duel, right after they fired their water guns at each other they accidentally hit Archie and Cheryl Blossom. Archie tells them that her family moved back to town and discover that she was the one who sent the letter to Archie. Upon having enough of Betty and Veronica's immature behavior, Archie chooses Cheryl over them.

== Special ==
Although the publicity surrounding Love Showdown implied a resolution to the long-running Betty vs. Veronica dilemma, a 48-page follow-up story (Archie's Love Showdown Special) returned the love triangle to its former status quo. It was published in mid-November 1994, shortly before Thanksgiving.

=== Plot ===
Desperate to get Archie back from Cheryl, the girls convince Ethel to disguise herself as a Pembrooke Academy student to convince her to stop seeing Archie. The plan backfires as it only convinces her that to be with him she has to attend Riverdale High with him. The girls then come up with another plan to break them up by making Archie jealous. Betty and Veronica invite Archie and Cheryl to go to Lodge's ski resort with them and plan to get him jealous by having him see them with Jughead and Reggie, respectively. However, Jughead asks Jason, Cheryl's twin brother, to be Betty's date and this causes Archie to become jealous. After Archie makes a fool of himself, Cheryl dumps him and Betty and Veronica go to comfort Jason after he gives him a black eye. Then after having a nightmare depicting Jason and Betty so in love with each other, Archie decides that Betty is the only girl for him and vows to tell her before it is too late. Upon finding her at Riverdale High he learns that Jason got on her nerves so much she almost gave him another black eye. Before he can tell her how he feels he gets distracted by a new girl, Savannah Smythe from Mississippi. Archie then gives her a tour of Riverdale High and tells Betty he will talk to her later.

== Sequel ==
A sequel titled Love Showdown II was released in Betty and Veronica Spectacular #64 and Archie & Friends #79.

=== Chapter 1 ===
After Betty and Veronica learn that a movie is going to be filmed in Riverdale they decide to try to get into it as extras. The girls find out that the movie is about a red haired boy named Arnie who is a love triangle with two girls, blonde Betsy and brunette Victoria. They both think that the plot is silly, but soon discover from Archie that it is based on their lives. They soon discover that Cheryl Blossom, whose family just moved back from England, is making the movie. Upon learning who Cheryl got to play them in the movie the girls decide to sabotage it, with no success.

=== Chapter 2 ===
Wanting to not think about Cheryl's movie, Archie, Betty, and Veronica decide to go see a movie, but discover that Cheryl has followed them. They then decide to make a snowman, but once again Cheryl shows up and causes trouble. They then learn from Brigitte that Cheryl is really filming a reality show and is following them around to get ratings for it. The girls decide not to act mad around Cheryl and after they tell her that they now know what she is up to, her reality show is canceled. A couple of weeks later Cheryl is enrolled at Riverdale High and tells the girls that her family has hit a financial snag, so she was filming the reality show to get them out of it. After school, Betty and Veronica learn from Mr. Lodge that Cheryl's father is his new employee.

== Impact ==
The storyline was the first time Archie Comics had attempted an "event"—a storyline with ostensibly lasting consequences which took place over the span of multiple titles. Such events experienced a vogue in the 1990s following the success of DC Comics' "Death of Superman" event in 1992–93, an event to which contemporary commentators and Archie Comic Publications compared "Love Showdown". According to Archie Comic Publications, sales of the series exceeded expectations, with reorders being filled at three times their normal rate.

Just months before the "Love Showdown" arc, Archie Comics had released a one-shot crossover comic with Marvel, Archie Meets the Punisher.

The arc came shortly after Archie Comic Publications hired King Features to manage the licensing of their intellectual property, sparking a wave of Archie-branded merchandise such as clothing, stationary, and kitchenwares. An Archie movie and musical were planned for 1995, though they failed to materialize.
