= Archie's Family Restaurants =

American restaurant chain

Archie's Family Restaurants was an American restaurant chain based on the characters by Archie Comics. The façades showed Jughead Jones eating a hamburger. Around 1972, Archie Comics' parent company, Archie Enterprises, Inc., decided it wanted to further diversify into food service operations. Barbara Kovacs and Gary Kovacs, sole owners of the recently founded BarKo Group, Inc., became interested in the venture and bought stock in the Archie companies. Consequently, BarKo received the contract to develop the restaurants.

In 1973, the first Archie's restaurant opened in Joliet, Illinois, on the north-east corner of Hammes and Jefferson (U.S. Route 52). An eight-page promotional comic, written by Frank Doyle, illustrated by Harry Lucey, and titled "Archie's Restaurant", was published in the 136th issue of Life with Archie. The comic notably featured Maurice Berlinsky, then the real-life mayor of Joliet, and Bob Anderson, then the real-life director of First National Bank of Joliet. The Archie's Restaurant storyline was also featured in issues #26-30 of Everything's Archie, and Pep Comics #280 and #295.

The next restaurant opened in Merrillville, Indiana. By May 1974, two more were on the drawing boards, for Matteson and Homewood, Illinois. Within five years, Kovacs hoped to open Archie's restaurants throughout the states of Illinois, Indiana, Michigan, Ohio, Pennsylvania, New Jersey, and New York. However, the two existing locations were badly mismanaged, which prompted Archie Comics to close them down and buy the stock back from BarKo.
