= Hal Stone =

Harlan "Hal" Stone (June 10, 1931 – February 21, 2007) was a radio actor best known for his performance as Jughead on the Archie Andrews radio series.

== Radio ==
Stone was a three-year-old child model who began acting on Broadway at age eight and then was heard as an actor on numerous network radio programs for 15 years. Archie Andrews began on the NBC Blue Network May 31, 1943, switched to Mutual in 1944, and then continued on NBC from 1945 until September 5, 1953. Hal Stone, then known as Harlan Stone, portrayed Archie's pal, Jughead, and was known for the catchphrase, "Aw... relax, Archie, re-laxxx!" Jughead was also played by Cameron Andrews.

== Television ==
After his radio career, Stone made appearances in early live television productions. Discharged from the Air Force after the Korean War, he obtained a degree in speech and drama from Hofstra University and studied television production at Columbia University. He spent 25 years as a television producer-director and also served as board chairman of Centrex Productions, Inc., a New York TV and videotape production company. He retired from television production in 1980.

== Books ==
Stone's autobiography, Aw... Relax, Archie! Re-laxx! was published in 2003. An accomplished artist, Stone illustrated children's books written by his second wife, Dorothy Dobson-Stone.

== Legacy ==
Four grizzly bears at the Bronx zoo were named Archie, Jughead, Betty and Veronica. In a curious coincidence, the bear named Jughead died March 2, 2007, nine days after Stone's death. Stone associate Frank Cernese recalled, "In another strange coincidence, Ferd Manning, who was Hal Stone's lighting director for many years, died on the same day. He passed just minutes before Hal, and all of Hal's ex-employees, including me, like to think that Ferd was lighting the way."
