= Burt Boyar =

American writer and actor (1927–2018)

- Born: Burton Anselm Boyar; November 30, 1927; New York City, New York, U.S.
- Died: April 4, 2018 (age 90); Los Angeles, California, U.S.
- Occupation(s): Author, biographer, columnist, actor
- Years active: 1939–2018
- Spouse: Jane Boyar (deceased)
- Website: www.burtboyar.com

Burt Boyar (November 30, 1927 – April 4, 2018) was a Broadway columnist, voice actor, and author. He voiced the title character of Archie Andrews for NBC Radio in 1945 and co-wrote Yes I Can: The Story of Sammy Davis, Jr. with wife Jane Boyar and Davis himself.

Boyar's work as a columnist was featured in The Morning Telegraph, The Philadelphia Inquirer, and TV Guide. He reached out to Davis for an interview after Mr. Wonderful opened on Broadway in 1956. They became close friends and after almost a year they began working on the best-selling memoir. Later a follow-up book, Why Me?, was published in 1989. Boyer also compiled a book of photographs taken by Davis, entitled Photo by Sammy Davis Jr, which was published in 2007.

Boyer's collection of material relating to Sammy Davis Jr. can be found at the Library of Congress.

== Biography ==
Burton Anselm Boyar was born in New York City. He was the middle son of Lillian and Benjamin Boyar. His father a theatrical general manager known as the "Mayor of Broadway." Boyar was a child actor; he starred in numerous radio series, among them he played Billy Batson on "Captain Marvel" and Archie Andrews in "Archie." Despite not graduating from high school or attending college, Boyar was adept at English composition. Boyar was an equestrian. He served in the National Guard during the Korean War. After completing his service, Boyar became a Broadway press agent, then a nationally syndicated columnist.

== Personal life and death ==
Boyar married Jane (née Feinstein -1997) in 1954 and they were married for 44 years. He never married Betsy Bloomingdale but was her close companion from 2001 until her death in 2016.

Boyar died in his sleep at his home in Los Angeles, California on April 4, 2018. He was 90.

== Bibliography ==
=== Books by Jane and Burt Boyar ===
- Yes I Can: The Story of Sammy Davis Jr. (1965; coauthor Sammy Davis Jr.)
- World Class (1975)
- Why Me? The Sammy Davis Jr. Story (1989; coauthor Sammy Davis Jr.)
- H.L. and Lyda: Growing Up in the H L Hunt and Lyda Bunker Hunt Family as Told by Their Eldest Daughter August House Publishers. (1994; as collaborators, primary author Margaret Hunt Hill)
- Sammy: An Autobiography (2000; coauthor Sammy Davis Jr.)
- Hitler Stopped by Franco. (2001)
- Invisible Scars (2012; released after Jane's death)

=== Books by Burt Boyar ===
- Photo by Sammy Davis, Jr. (2007; cover reads "Photo by Sammy Davis, Jr. Text by Burt Boyar)
- Blessed (2012)
- Low Society: Fables of the 50s’ and 60s’ Café Society New York City (2013)
