= Life with Archie =

Comic book series published from 1958 to 1991

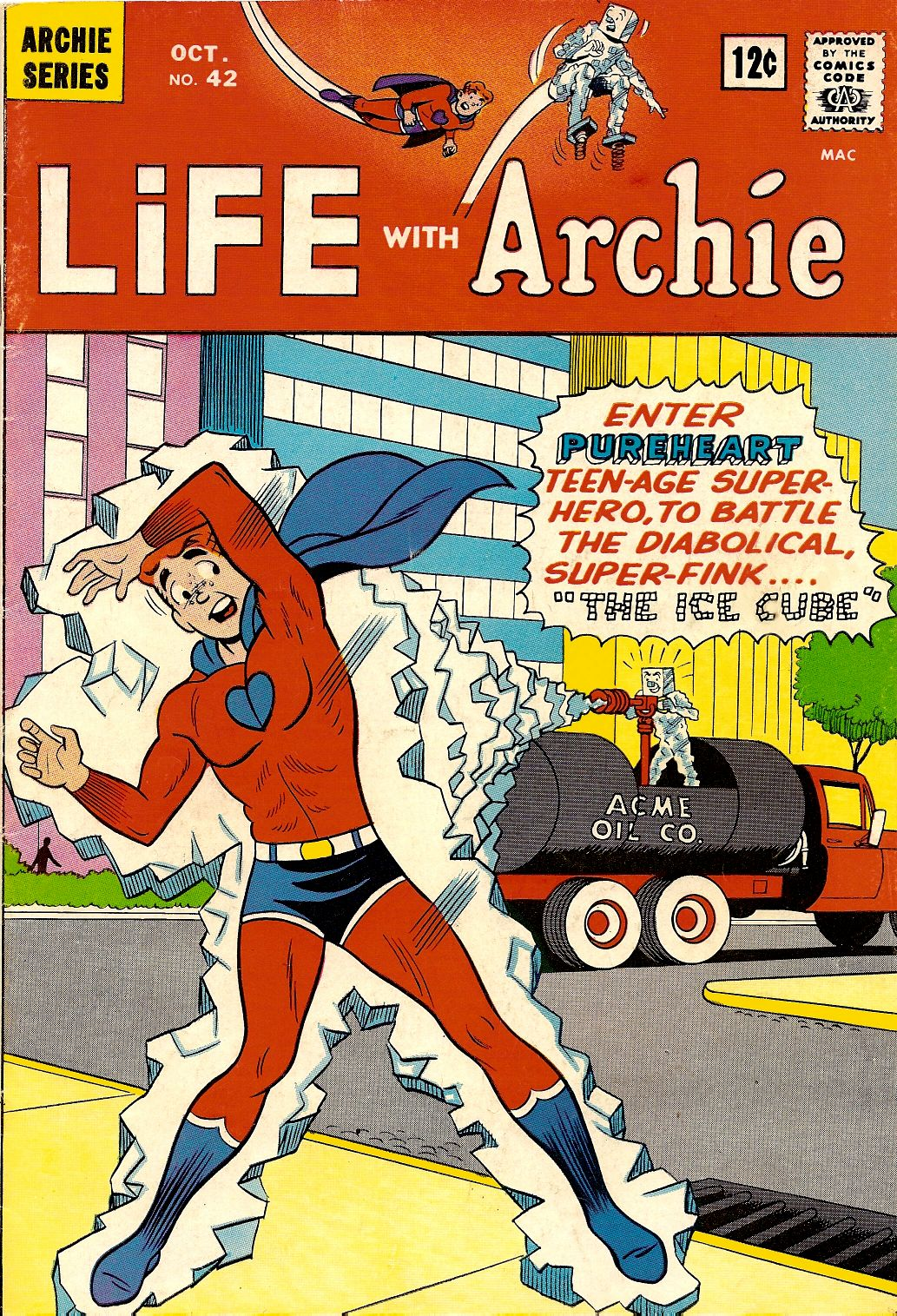
- Cover of Life with Archie #42 (Oct. 1965), with Archie as Pureheart the Powerful

Publication information
- Publisher: Archie Comics
- Format: ongoing
- Genre: Alternate universes Superheroes; Soap opera
- Publication date: (vol. 1); September 1958 - July 1991 (vol. 2); September 2010 - September 2014
- No. of issues: (vol. 1): 286 (vol. 2): 37
- Main character(s): Archie Andrews; Betty Cooper; Veronica Lodge

Life with Archie is a comic book published by Archie Comics from 1958 to 1991. It featured Archie Andrews in adventure stories that were more dramatic than the standard Archie tales. In 2010, it was revived as a magazine-sized comic devoted to stories that grew out of Archie Marries Veronica/Archie Marries Betty. Archie's character was killed in the second to last issue, Life with Archie #36.

== Volume 1 (1958 - 1991) ==
This title featured longer stories as compared to standard Archie comics (one to two stories per issue, instead of the usual four). Most often, the stories were of adventures experienced by Archie and the gang, as they thwarted thieves, smugglers, ghosts and the like. Occasionally, Archie "alternate universes" were featured, in which Archie and the gang were secret agents (the man from RIVERDALE), or superheroes (Archie gang-based superheroes) by the names of Pureheart the Powerful (Archie), Superteen (Betty), and Captain Hero (Jughead), with Reggie as the antihero Evilheart. Later issues of Life with Archie homed some of the earliest appearances of Cheryl Blossom.

== Volume 2 (The Married Life) ==
This title was revived in 2010, following the parallel universes of Archie's married lives with both Betty and Veronica, combined with teen-magazine style features. Paul Kupperberg authors these new stories, based on a concept created by Michael Uslan. Since the makeover, the series has somewhat fallen under the genre of soap opera.

=== Archie Loves Veronica ===
Lodge—A complaint!: Mr. Lodge gives his daughter an Executive position at Lodge Industries, making her Archie's boss. After the announcement, Reggie, Archie and Veronica will attend a reunion party at Pop's, at which they hope to see Betty, who believes she is a failure due to losing her job and being unable to find true love. Just before the party, Midge Klump breaks up with Moose Mason. Upon reaching Pop's, she meets Jughead Jones, who sees the Choklit Shoppe as his future and is angered by Pop's imminent bankruptcy as a result of the two large franchises settling in next door. As Archie and Veronica prepare to leave for the reunion, Mr. Lodge reveals the non-negotiable offer he intends to make to Pop, and instructs the two to make said offer at the party. Meanwhile, Moose visits "Ashram & Spa" for yoga and anger management, where he meets Ilana, a blind yoga teacher. The two begin dating. Moose informs Ilana that he will commence working at Riverdale High as the assistant-custodian. Yearning for a boost of confidence, Betty calls ever-confident Cheryl Blossom, who is living in Hollywood to work on her modeling and acting aspirations. Feeding Betty with tales of success and joy, Cheryl has, in reality, been cut off by her family after dropping out of school, and is actually working as a waitress. When all the old friends finally meet at the reunion, Archie takes Pop aside and makes the offer, enraging Jughead. This sparks off a verbal fight, which ends with Moose Mason declaring that he will run for mayor.

Main Street Mangle: Archie & Veronica argue about the latter's father as they walk down Memory Lane, driving a wedge between the two. Meanwhile, feeling lonely and neglected, Betty calls Veronica and invites her to dinner. Veronica accepts, but forgets, because of a further quarrel with Archie, leading Betty to believe that she is unwanted, and should leave Riverdale. Moose holds his first press conference as a mayoral candidate, but fumbles over the most basic questions. Nancy and Chuck find themselves struggling to keep their comic book shop going despite the recession, and lament that their respective writing and drawing talents are buried. The story ends with Betty leaving in a cab."

=== Archie Loves Betty ===
...Love finds Archie Andrews: Betty and Archie are living in New York City, with Betty employed as a junior executive at Sack's 6th Avenue, and Archie trying to find success as a musician, only to drift from one small-time music venue to another. Although Archie is eventually signed by a talent agent, his singing career only extends to New York state. At Sack's, a 10% pay cut for all is announced, worrying Betty, who is further frustrated when her husband suggests giving up his music career and living purely on her salary. Meanwhile, Archie is surprised by Mr. Lodge's appearance at a sold-out show. Apparently, Veronica has been unhappy since Archie chose Betty over her, and has been unable to concentrate on her work at Lodge Industries. Hiram Lodge proposes Archie leave Betty to make Veronica happy, enraging Archie, who demands Lodge never reappear in his life again. Back in Riverdale at Pop Tate's, Fred and Mary Andrews, and Hal and Alice Cooper are in the midst of discussing their children, as Mr. Weatherbee and Miss Grundy enter the establishment together. Miss Grundy quietly informs Mr. Weatherbee that her doctor had run medical tests, and discovered she has serious problems, spurring him to propose to her. Post-confrontation, Archie is exhausted. He calls it a night and finds himself at a small cafe, where he comes face to face with Ambrose Pipps, his childhood best friend who moved away when he was ten. The two old friends catch up, then Archie returns home to Betty. The story closes with an adult Dilton Doiley, now a scientist looking in on the two parallel universes.

To exact revenge on Archie for turning down his offer, Hiram Lodge attempts to make life unbearable for everyone that Archie cares about. Archie refuses to back down, realizing he belongs with Betty. When Veronica discovers what her father has been doing, she tries to help stop him. A triple wedding is held, for, respectively, Mr. Weatherbee/Miss Grundy, Mr. Svenson/Miss Beazly, and Jughead Jones/Midge Klump. Six weeks after her wedding, Mrs. Weatherbee (formerly Miss Grundy) succumbs to renal failure and passes away. Her death makes Betty and Archie realize they belong in Riverdale, and they finally accept teaching jobs at their alma mater. With the retirement of Mr. and Mrs. Svenson from their jobs as custodian and lunch room worker, Moose Mason and Bella Beazly take over.

=== The Death of Archie ===
On April 9, 2014, Archie Comics announced that Archie Andrews would die in the July 2014 issue as he tries to save one of his friends in what would be the second-to-last issue of Life with Archie. Archie Comics CEO Jon Goldwater verified that in both parallel futures covered by the Life with Archie series, Archie's final fate is the same.

On July 14, 2014, it was revealed that Archie would be killed saving character Kevin Keller from an assassination attempt from a stalker's bullet. Keller is a newly elected United States Senator who won on a platform of stricter gun control legislation.

In Issue #36, the shooting takes place at a fundraiser being held at The Chocklit Shoppe; while Kevin's FBI bodyguards are distracted by a suspicious character wearing a hoodie, Archie spots the real stalker (revealed to be a busboy working at The Chocklit Shoppe) aiming a gun. Archie knocks Kevin and Clay out of the way just as the stalker fires, hitting Archie in the abdomen; the stalker is subdued by security before he can fire again. Archie's dying words are to Betty and Veronica: "I've always loved you ..." The last two panels in that issue are full-page size: the first panel shows Archie's body being cradled by Jughead as Kevin, Betty and Veronica kneel beside him weeping and the rest of the room also in tears; the final panel shows Archie's spilled chocolate soda with three straws, which he had knocked over when he leaped forward to push Kevin and Clay out of the way.

Issue #37 takes place a year after the tragedy. Kevin returns to Riverdale to be the guest speaker at a special ceremony, attended by everyone, in which Riverdale High's name is officially changed to Archie Andrews High School. The series ends on a note of hope as Jughead, Reggie, Betty, Veronica and Kevin gather at The Chocklit Shoppe and Jughead serves a chocolate soda to three kids who are seen a few times throughout the story ... a red-haired boy, a blonde girl and a dark-haired girl, who share the soda with three straws. Jughead is about to serve a second soda when Reggie tells him, "Hold off on that second soda ... They seem to be doing fine with the one!" The five look on smiling as Jughead replies, "Yep, they remind me of someone ... for sure!" as we see in the foreground the three kids, the boy between the two girls, sharing the soda in exactly the same pose as Veronica, Archie and Betty in former times.

== Collected editions ==
Life with Archie: The Married Life has been assembled into the following collections:

=== Trade paperbacks ===
Title	ISBN	Release date	Collected material	Issues published
Archie: The Married Life Book 1	978-1936975013	October 4, 2011	Life with Archie: The Married Life #1–6	July 2010 – February 2011
Archie: The Married Life Book 2	978-1879794993	April 3, 2012	Life with Archie: The Married Life #7-12	March 2011 – August 2011
Archie: The Married Life Book 3	978-1936975358	February 26, 2013	Life with Archie: The Married Life #13-18	September 2011 – March 2012
Archie: The Married Life Book 4	978-1936975693	November 5, 2013	Life with Archie: The Married Life #19-24	May 2012 – November 2012
Archie: The Married Life Book 5	978-1619889026	August 26, 2014	Life with Archie: The Married Life #25-30	December 2012 – June 2013
Archie: The Married Life Book 6	978-1619889453	November 25, 2014	Life with Archie: The Married Life #31-37	July 2013 – July 2014
The Death of Archie: A Life Celebrated	978-1627389822	August 19, 2014	Life with Archie: The Married Life #36-37	July 2014
