= Paul White (missionary) =

Australian missionary (1910–1992)

Paul Hamilton Hume White (26 February 1910 – 21 December 1992) was an Australian missionary, evangelist, radio program host and author.

== Early life and missionary work ==
White was born in Bowral, New South Wales. After studying medicine at the University of Sydney, he married Mary Bellingham and together they travelled to Tanganyika Territory (now part of Tanzania) as Church Missionary Society (CMS) missionaries in 1938, where White established a hospital at Mvumi Mission which soon replaced Kilimatinde as the main medical centre of the CMS mission in Tanganyika.

White succeeded Dr Cyril Wallace as the medical secretary of the Diocese of Central Tanganyika in 1939. In 1941 after only two years in missionary work White had to return to Australia due to his wife's illness. On the way home, he developed a boil in, to use his own words, 'a place which caused me to take a pillow, cut a hole in it, and sit very carefully (!)' Unable to take part in the shipboard entertainment he started to write. From this came his first missionary book, Doctor of Tanganyika, which is factual and contains many photographs taken by White himself, to illustrate how missionary work was carried out under such primitive settings, with the local Chigogo people.

== Published work ==
Following his return to Australia, White went on to write Jungle Doctor, the first in an extensive series bearing the same name, which have been translated into more than 80 languages. At the same time he began his Jungle Doctor radio program, which continued for 25 years. His books are based in Africa and depict African folklore and missionary adventure. Many of White's stories include moral teaching. They tell of surgical operations in the wild using the most basic equipment and the very colourful people of Africa, including his friend Daudi (David) Matama, and quite often striking against the village witchdoctors who relied on black magic to gain power. Several stories are tales of good winning against evil. Although the stories are fiction, they are based on fact, based on White's own, as well as other people's experiences.

Original editions were illustrated by Graham Wade, who also produced Jungle Doctor comic strips. White then authored six 'Fable' books, in the form of the traditional African 'round the fire' storytelling, incorporating Christian moral lessons. They are Jungle Doctor's Fables, Jungle Doctor's Tug of War, Jungle Doctor's Monkey Tales, Jungle Doctor's Hippo Happenings, Jungle Doctor's Rhino Rumblings and Jungle Doctor Meets Mongoose.

Some of the Jungle Doctor stories were released on record in the 1960s, with White himself narrating them.

== Other work ==
As well as pioneering Christian media in the form of both radio and television in Australia, White was active in student evangelism and is credited with revitalising evangelical Christian student groups in Australia after World War II. He became general secretary of the Intervarsity Fellowship in 1943. In 1955 he purchased land for the Crusader Union of NSW to build a campsite in Galston Gorge. He was the inaugural chairman of African Enterprise Australia from 1978 White also continued to practice medicine on a part-time basis right up until his death.

== Death ==
White died on 21 December 1992, aged 82. He is buried at St. Simon & St. Jude Anglican church in Bowral.

== Bibliography ==
=== Jungle Doctor Series ===
- Jungle Doctor (1942); reprinted as Jungle Doctor's Africa
- Jungle Doctor on Safari (1943)
- Jungle Doctor Operates (1944)
- Jungle Doctor Attacks Witchcraft (1947)
- Jungle Doctor's Enemies (1948, revised 1987)
- Jungle Doctor Meets a Lion (1950)
- Jungle Doctor to the Rescue (1951)
- Jungle Doctor's Casebook (1952, revised 1991)
- Jungle Doctor and the Whirlwind (1952, revised 1987)
- Eyes on Jungle Doctor (1953)
- Jungle Doctor Looks for Trouble (1953)
- Jungle Doctor Goes West (1954)
- Jungle Doctor Stings a Scorpion (1955)
- Jungle Doctor Hunts Big Game (1956)
- Jungle Doctor on the Hop (1957, revised 1988)
- Jungle Doctor's Crooked Dealings (1959, revised 1988)
- Jungle Doctor Spots a Leopard (1963, revised 1987)
- Jungle Doctor Pulls a Leg (1964)
- Jungle Doctor Sees Red (1968)
- Yacobo in Slippery Places (1973, revised 1988); reprinted as Jungle Doctor in Slippery Places

=== Jungle Doctor's Fables Series ===
- 1: Jungle Doctor's Fables (1955)
- 2: Jungle Doctor's Monkey Tales (1957)
- 3: Jungle Doctor's Tug-of-War (1958)
- 4: Jungle Doctor's Hippo Happenings (1966)
- 5: Jungle Doctor's Rhino Rumblings (1974?)
- 6: Jungle Doctor Meets Mongoose (1974)

=== Jungle Doctor Picture Fables Series (Illustrated by Peter Oram) ===
- 1: Donkey Wisdom (1973)
- 2: Famous Monkey Last Words (1973)
- 3: Monkey in a Lion's Skin (1973)
- 4: Reflections of Hippo (1973)
- 5: The Cool Pool (1975)
- 6: The Monkey and the Eggs (1975)
- 7: Monkey Crosses the Equator (1975)
- 8: Sweet and Sour Hippo (1975)

=== Jungle Doctor Comic Books ===
- 1: The Great Wall
- 2: The Monkeys who didn't believe in the Crocodile
- 3: Monkeys in the Bog
- 4: Out on a Limb
- 5: Little Leopards become Big Leopards
- 6: The Sticky End
- 7: Monkey in a Lion Skin
- 8: The Goat who wanted to become a Lion
- 9: The Helpfulness of Hippo
- 10: Safe as Poison
- 11: Knots Untied
- 12: Wisdom of Donkeys

=== Jungle Doctor Novels ===
- 1: Lion Hunter: An African Love Story (1982/1983)
- 2: Jungle Doctor's Safari from Fear: An African Adventure (1984)
- 3: Maasai: An African Drama (1985) (expanded from the theme of Jungle Doctor Sees Red)

=== The Ranford Series (in collaboration with Dr. David Britten) ===
- The Ranford Mystery Miler (1960)
- Ructions at Ranford (c1961)
- Ranford Goes Fishing (1962)
- Ranford in Flames (1965)

=== With Clifford Warne ===
- Using the Bible: For Reading Out Loud (1979)
  - later republished as How to read the Bible aloud (1983)
- The great escape (1981)
- Simon's lucky day (1981)
- The daredevils (1981)
- The rescue squad (1981)
- How to hold an audience without a rope (1982)

=== Other works ===
- Medical Man or Medicine Man?
- I. V. F. Invites a General (1948)
- What's happening to mother? : understanding about birth (1976)
- What's happened to Auntie Jean? : understanding about death (1976)
- Get moving! : motivation for living (1976)
- Alias jungle doctor : an autobiography (1977)
- Uproar at Radford (1989)
- Radford's big race (1989)
- Doctor of Tanganyika (1941)
- Jungle Doctor's Progress (1962)
- Jungle Doctor's Panorama (1962)
