= Graham Wade =

Australian Christian cartoonist and film maker (1931–2009)

Graham Randell Wade (August 16, 1931–August 2009) was an Australian Christian cartoonist, film maker and communicator. He was best known for his illustrations for Dr. Paul White's Jungle Doctor series. Wade went on to form Pilgrim International, a Christian-based media company. As creative director for Pilgrim, he filmed many of the World Vision specials with celebrities such as Katrina Lee (news reader from 1978 to 1997), alerting Australians to the plight of starving African children. This along with the 48-hour famine campaign placed World Vision Australia as Australia's largest non-government aid organisation. His "speed sketches" of Bible stories were seen on commercial TV stations.
