= Kathleen Webb =

American comic book writer and artist

- Born: October 6, 1956 (age 70) Washington State
- Areas: Scripter, penciller
- Notable works: Archie titles, Holly and the Ivy Halls strip

Kathleen Webb (born October 6, 1956) is an American comic book writer and artist and one of the first female writers for Archie Comics.

== Biography ==
Kathleen Webb was born in Puyallup, Washington. Mentored by Archie Comics writer-artist Dan DeCarlo, she sold her first script to that comic book company in 1985. As of 2008, she continued to write for, primarily, Archie Comics' Betty and Veronica titles. Webb has also penciled Mattel-licensed Barbie stories for Marvel Comics.

== Christian comics ==
For Christian comics, Webb wrote and drew the Holly and the Ivy Halls comic strip for Focus on the Family's Brio Magazine from 1993 to 2004. She has also illustrated Sunday-school papers for Gospel Light Publications; pencilled pages in the comics Aida-Zee and Paro-Dee; scripted and pencilled the tract The Monster; and contributed to the anthology Proverbs & Parables. A comic strip of her personal testimony appeared in the first issue of Christian Comics & Games Magazine in 1996.

She was also a panelist for the second Christian-comics panel of the San Diego Comic Convention in 1995.
