= Jughead Jones =

Archie Comics character

- Archie Comics character
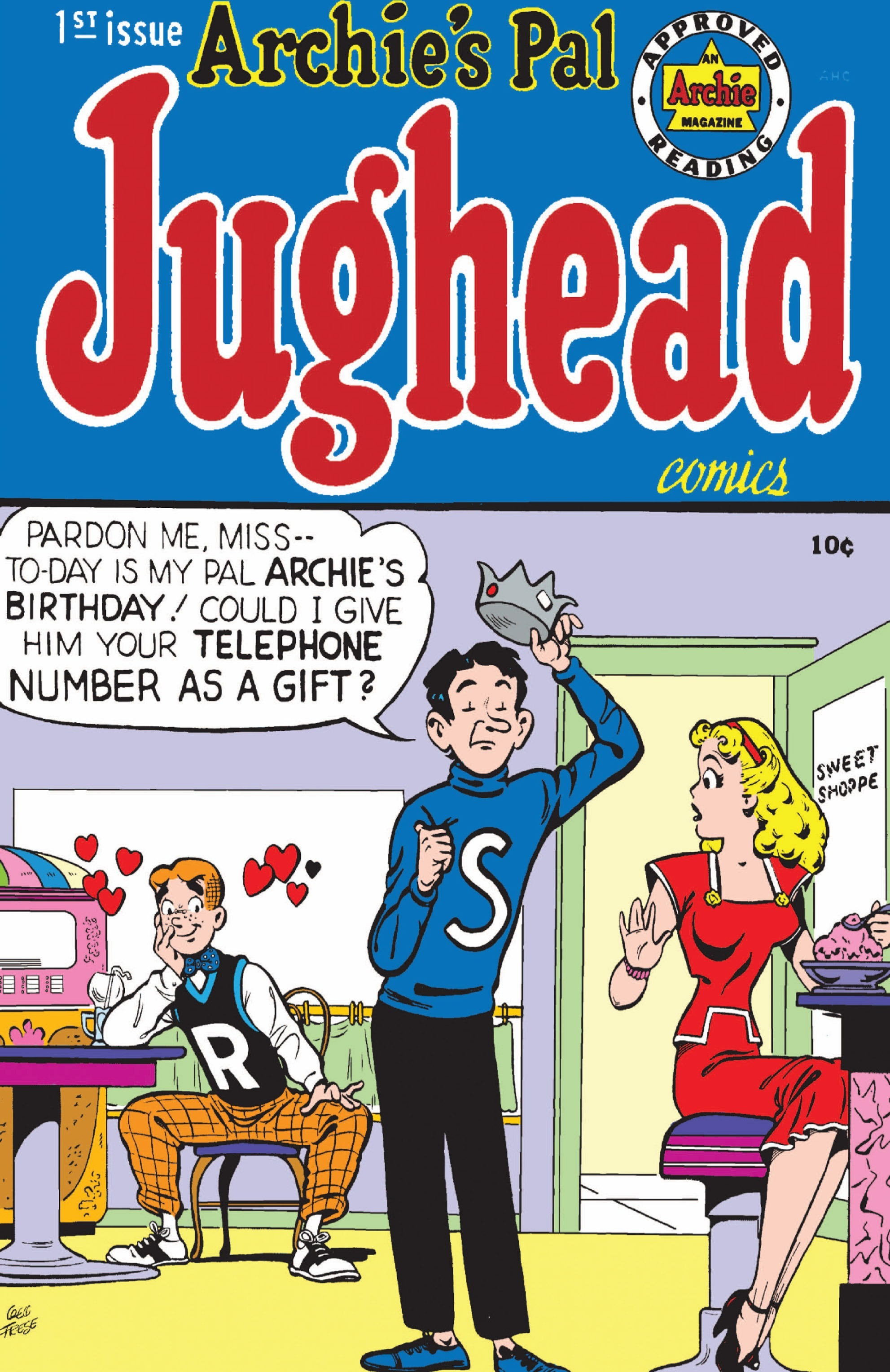
- Cover of Archie's Pal Jughead no. 1 (January 1949)
- First appearance: Pep Comics No. 22 (December 1941)
- Created by: Bob Montana; John L. Goldwater
- Portrayed by: Cole Sprouse (Riverdale); Sam Whipple (Archie: To Riverdale and Back Again); Mihir Ahuja (The Archies)
- Voiced by: Hal Stone (radio); Cameron Andrews (radio); Arnold Stang (radio); Howard Morris (1968–1976); Don Messick (1968); John Erwin (Kenner Talking Show Projector records); Michael Fantini (1987); Chris Lundquist (1999–2002)
- Notable artists: Samm Schwartz
- Hometown: Riverdale
- School: Riverdale High School

In-universe information
- Significant others: Betty Cooper (girlfriend in Riverdale); January McAndrews (girlfriend); Midge Klump; Ethel Muggs; Tabitha Tate (girlfriend in Riverdale); Veronica Lodge (girlfriend in Riverdale)
- Relatives: Forsythe Pendleton Jones Jr (father); Gladys Jones (mother); Jellybean Jones (sister); Souphead Jones (cousin); Bingo Wilkin (cousin)

Forsythe Pendleton "Jughead" Jones III is one of the fictional characters created by Bob Montana and John L. Goldwater in Archie Comics who first appeared in the first Archie story, from Pep Comics #22 (December 1941). He is the drummer of the Archies and is a son of Forsythe Pendleton Jones II; in one of the early Archie newspaper comic strips, he is identified as John Jugworth Jones III (and in one strip, likely due to a continuity error, as Forsythe Van Jones). He has a white sheepdog named Hot Dog and a younger sister, Forsythia "Jellybean" Jones.

Jughead (shortened to Jug or Juggie) is the best friend of vocalist/guitarist Archie Andrews. Jughead is a smart, sharp-tongued, laid-back, and eccentric high school student. He is obsessed with eating food and in some storylines is asexual. Most see him as being lazy. He can be identified by his long nose, half-closed eyes, "S" sweatshirt, and whoopee cap (a crown-like warped and trimmed fedora hat), generally referred to as his Beanie in the comics. Jughead is portrayed by Cole Sprouse in the live-action CW series Riverdale, and Mihir Ahuja in The Archies.

== Concept and creation ==
Bob Montana stated that Jughead was a character he imagined, unlike other characters in the series who were based on people he knew. Montana's widow, Peg Bertholet, stated that high school friend of Montana's named Skinny Linehan supposedly had some of Jughead's peculiar traits.

Bertholet has stated that the "S" insignia refers to a location called Skunk Hill in Haverhill, Massachusetts which Montana turned into Squirrel Hill. The "S" alludes to a combination of the location and Montana's elementary school athletic team near Haverhill called the Tigers. Bertholet has stated that "S" stands for "'Squirrel Hill Independent Tigers,' and you couldn't abbreviate it any other way."

== History and character ==
Jughead generally has a characteristic wry and sarcastic sense of humor. He is considered a bit of an oddity, but prefers his nonconformism as opposed to going along with others' styles. His many quirks make him the butt of teasing and abuse from Reggie, Veronica, and even other classmates and teachers. Many episodes involve Reggie and Jughead trying to outdo one another with pranks and bets, and Jughead almost always comes out the victor. He is revealed to be extremely clever and creative when necessary and he often takes advantage of Reggie's and his other tormentors' weaknesses (and has fun all the while).

In the earlier comics, a running gag involved various characters trying to discover Jughead's real name, while Jughead thwarted their efforts. In one story, Archie Andrews and Reggie Mantle go to the school office, where a woman tells them that Jughead's real first name is Steve. After Archie and Reggie leave the office, the audience learns that the woman is actually Jughead's aunt who has just lied as a favor to Jughead to help keep his real first name (Forsythe) hidden. The earliest stories indicated that the mention of his name drove girls wild for him. The first of these appeared in Jughead #159 (August 1968). In Little Archie #49 (September 1968), Miss Grundy revealed his real name at the start of class, and it drove girls wild. In a later story (issue #1 of The Jughead Jones Comics Digest, June 1977) we find out he is named after his ancestor, Forsythe P. Jones, who is an American hero. For a brief time, Jughead started to use his given name in honor of his ancestor. After learning that this ancestor was married nine times, Jughead reverted to his nickname.

Another mystery that follows Jughead's character is the meaning of the "S" on his sweatshirt. This remains a mystery to this day, although many stories have hinted at a meaning. In Jughead #30 (1992), when his psychiatrist, Sara, asked him "why an 'S'?" he replied "I dunno! My third cousin was called skinny..." The triangular banner on the cover of issue 140 of Archie & Friends shows that the "S" stands for Silby, as in Silby High School, which he attended for a few months as a freshman. At one time after his sweater was filled with holes due to what he thought was a moth when it was actually a chemical accident caused in lab class, he reveals that he simply likes the letter S and finds it "compatible", because the letter can stand for "soup, sandwich, steak and all kinds of goodies!" after his friends ask him. Betty rolls her eyes at the explanation and adds, "S stands for "sorry I asked"!" Another theory is that, as he is a non-conformist, he wears an "S" as opposed to his classmates who wear sweaters adorned with an "R" which stands for Riverdale.

=== Appetite and love for food ===
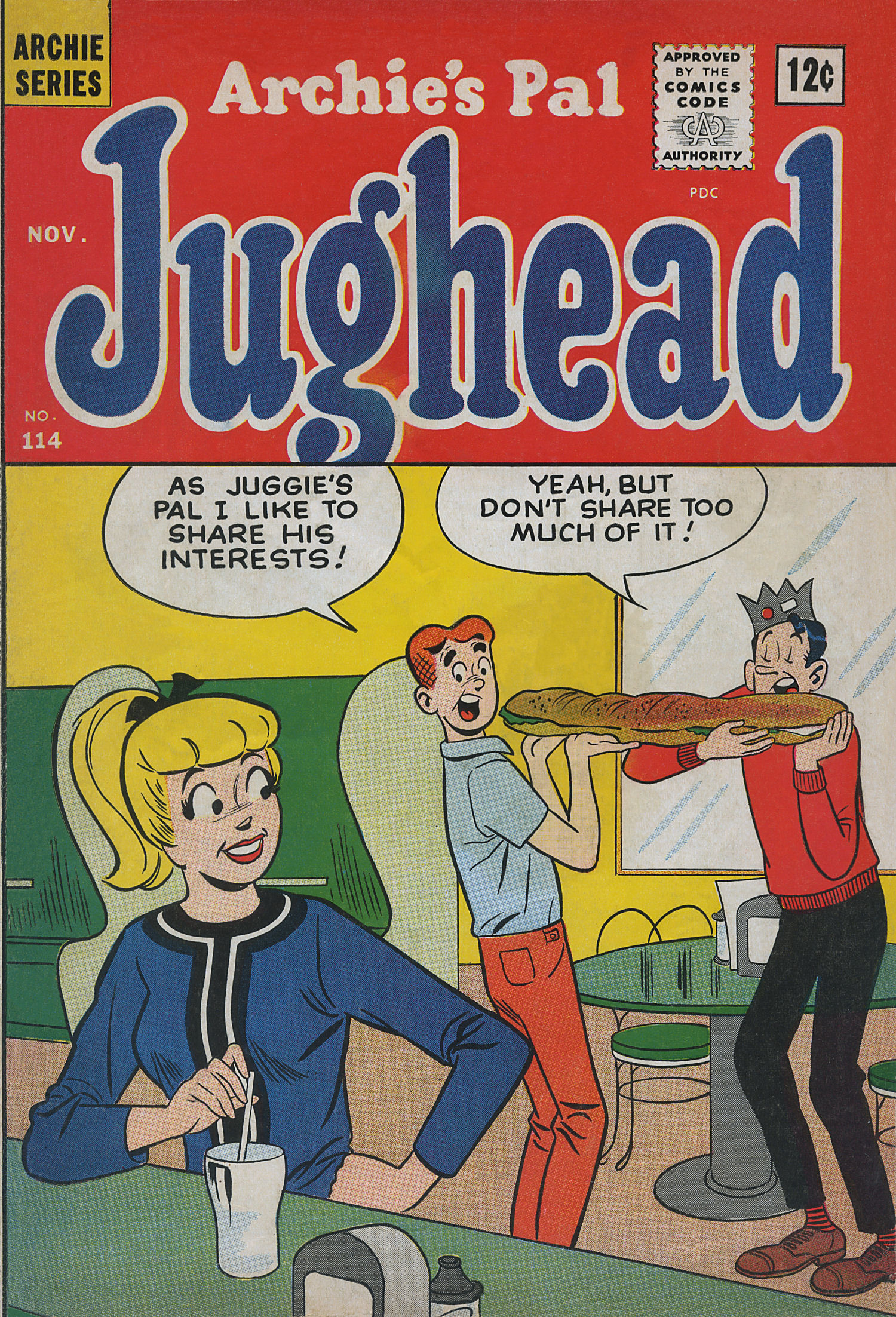
Cover of Archie's Pal Jughead #114 (November 1964)

Jughead is known for his love of food, especially hamburgers, and his ability to consume absurdly large quantities in a single sitting without getting sick or gaining weight, although he often sports a pot-belly immediately after a particularly large meal. Jughead is a preferred customer of most of Riverdale's food establishments, especially Pop Tate's Chock'lit Shoppe, except when he is behind on paying his usually lengthy tab. In one story, he was given a "Restaurant Club Card" and ate out at high-class restaurants until he found out how much interest the card charged, and Pop Tate loaned him the money on the condition that he eat exclusively at the Chock'lit Shoppe. His ability to eat so much food without gaining weight is attributed to a very rare and implausibly high metabolism. He once claimed that he weighed 300 pounds after a meal, although he is usually portrayed as slim and healthy.

Jughead's special abilities concerning food extend to being able to identify food in a sealed can by smell, and being able to detect the slightest flaws in food preparation by taste. As such, he is a respected food critic, as well as a gourmet chef himself. One time, when he sought out Miss Grundy's help with his creative writing, she suggested that he write about a subject he knew, leading to the "Forsythe P. Jones Cookbook".

Jughead often participates in eating contests, usually winning outright, or else easily coming from behind after comic distractions, and often with room to spare while the competitor retires unwell. In a citywide eating contest, he ate a colossal burger made up of sixteen different burgers. Jughead also set two world records for eating pizza; one for speed-eating a pizza, and another for eating the most pizzas in one sitting: twelve. Jughead's appetite is so large that even if he eats shortly before such contests, it does not affect his performance. For example, a rival high school once sent a girl, Jane Dough, to take Jughead to various restaurants and feed him as much as possible. Amazingly, Jughead still managed to win the contest. He explained to Jane that top athletes need to train constantly in order to stay in shape, and she actually helped him "train" for the contest.

One running gag depicts Jughead visiting restaurants that promise "all you can eat" special deals, with the devastated restaurateur closing down as Jughead leaves.

Despite his appetite, Jughead is not known to be stingey with food, or to let others go hungry. When a store selling penny candy opened in Riverdale, he spent his whole allowance on a huge bag of candy, only to meet a penniless young boy outside the shop. Jughead wrestled with his desire, but he chose to give the candy to the boy. In a similar story, Jughead met a homeless person who liked the same kind of pizza as he did, and decided to give him the pizza he had just purchased. In another story, after winning three pizzas a week for six months for being a pizzeria's one-millionth customer, he donated them all to a soup kitchen where he volunteered.

Because of his well-known food obsession, Jughead was shown eating a hamburger on the facades of the short-lived Archie's Family Restaurants.

=== Jughead's hat ===
Jughead is almost always seen wearing his trademark beanie with both a round and square pin. This type of crown-shaped cap, called a whoopee cap, sometimes a "Jughead cap" or "crown", was popular among boys in the 1930s and 1940s. It was made from a man's felt fedora hat with the brim trimmed in a zig-zag and turned up. Bottle caps could be "pinned" in place using the cap's removable cork lining. In the 1920s and 1930s, college freshmen were sometimes required to wear them for initiation purposes, and such caps were often worn by mechanics. Similar caps have appeared on other comic book/strip, cartoon, and children's book characters such as Eddie Stimson in Little Lulu, Melvin Wisenheimer in Little Audrey, Skuzz in The Berenstain Bears, and Bugs Meany in Encyclopedia Brown as well as on Goober Pyle on The Andy Griffith Show and Jeff Goldblum's character "Freak #1" in Death Wish. Jughead's hat was recolored in black in the Filmation cartoons and pink in The New Archies. Over the course of the character's publication, Jughead's hat has evolved from a modified fedora to its more recognisable "crown" appearance.

Though some view the hat as strange and immature, Jughead considers it a good luck charm and when it is taken from him, misfortune comes his way. While on the school baseball team, Jughead was pulled aside and reprimanded by school principal Mr. Weatherbee for wearing the hat instead of a proper baseball uniform cap. Jughead complied, but then started performing so badly that Weatherbee was forced to relent.

In the "Time Police" comic, there is a double of his beanie given to him by an unknown benefactor (later revealed to be himself) that allows him to travel in time.

Some stories showed him wear a unique pin on his hat which attracts many girls to him, so he hid it to avoid the crowd of girls rushing him.

The hat also seems to define part of Jughead's personality. One story has the gang try to convince him to try a different hat, but it is revealed that whatever hat he tried on changed his personality to suit the hat. When they had him try on a detective hat, he focused on clues that would have gotten Archie in trouble with Betty and Veronica, and took a hair from Reggie's sweater that implied that he sneaked a date with Midge behind Moose's back (the look on both of their faces imply he was on to something). Jughead also stated that he felt naked without a hat. Finally, Veronica gave him a special hat to try on. When he did, everyone said it suited him (it was an ugly thing but looked comical. She said she was saving it for a Mad Hatter party). Jughead tried wearing it for a day at school, but scared several students, teachers, and even Miss Beazly the cafeteria lady) they begged him to go back to his trademark hat. When he asked what they'd do if he did, they offered him a platter of hamburgers and he happily agreed.

In Jughead and Friends Digest #25 story "The Secret of Jughead's Hat" his cap is destroyed in a laundry accident. Wendy Weatherbee (Principal Weatherbee's niece) replaces the lost hat by doing exactly as explained above when she takes an old fedora and cuts it and shapes it to remake the whoopee cap or crown.

=== Family and friends ===
Jughead's best friend is Archie Andrews, despite their personality difference. Archie was the first person that Jughead met upon moving to Riverdale, and he is often dragged into Archie's schemes and antics. Jughead is usually the first one to bail Archie out of trouble (though some times he only makes things worse). Jughead, extremely loyal, is willing to do almost anything to help his friend, something that Archie occasionally takes for granted.

Reggie Mantle is another one of Jughead's close friends, though his and Jughead's relationship is defined by their constant competition. Reggie never loses an opportunity to insult Jughead ("needle-nose" being his favorite nickname) and Jughead often responds with tricks to aggravate Reggie. Though it often appears they hate each other, and neither will admit otherwise, they really do care for one another. Jughead will even help Reggie escape being injured when Moose Mason is angry with him.

Alongside Archie, Betty Cooper frequently slips into the best friend role for Jughead in the comics. Their mutual love and appreciation for food (she cooks, he eats), and continuously going to bat for each other have made their friendship a stronghold in the comics. While generally disinterested in matters of the heart, Jughead frequently stands up for Betty when Archie breaks her heart. In one comic, Jughead tells Betty that if he were to ever kiss a girl willingly, it would be her.

Jughead and Veronica Lodge are constantly arguing. Veronica cannot stand his laid-back attitude witticisms, and Jughead enjoys teasing her and making her lose her temper with clever insults. Their relationship would be considered that of "frenemies". Although at times, he relishes causing her to get angry because sometimes he sees her as an uncaring selfish snob. He once told Veronica he was "mad with passion" for her, and began popping up wherever she went, to get her off his back after she criticized him publicly. They were once cast together in a school play, which required them to kiss. Due to the way Jughead kissed her, she was caught up in the moment and fell in love with him for a while. However, Jughead managed to get her over her crush, with the help of a garlic and onion sandwich.

Jughead's other friends include Dilton Doiley and Moose Mason. Other than Dilton, Jughead probably gets along with Moose better than the other boys because of his non-confrontational attitude (and his lack of interest in Moose's girlfriend Midge). Jughead's nerdy ways and lack of interest in sports and girls probably account for how well he gets along with Dilton.

Jughead's family includes his father, also named Forsythe, his mother Gladys, and in later comics, his younger sister Jellybean. He also has many eccentric relatives including slightly-addled Uncle Herman, or "Doc Jones", a daffy and slightly pompous inventor whose creations usually wreak havoc on Jughead and/or his friends and his lookalike younger cousin, Souphead. Other one-time relatives appear frequently. Jughead also tells many stories of his ancestors, who prove to be quite as interesting as himself. A 1970s "Archie" cartoon episode featured Jughead's paternal grandparents—both of whom resemble Jughead.

Another acquaintance of Jughead's is Trula Twyst, Riverdale High's budding pop psychologist, who is constantly trying to analyze Jughead to determine what makes him so odd. The two share a strange love/hate relationship that would have gone much smoother had they not met the way they did- Trula tricked Jughead into dating her in order to become more popular.

In one story, Jughead claimed his great-grandmother was a Native American "from the Pawtuxet tribe", despite the fact that the Patuxet were killed off by 1622. In another story from the same era, he claimed his great-great-grandfather was "an eskimo", who was "the only cop north of Nome...'Ol' Bluenose Jones' they called him!" It is likely that neither of these claims are meant to be taken seriously. In both stories he also used his claims to make fun of Veronica, which suggests more that his comments were meant as jokes, since Jughead has a history of making up fibs to tease Veronica and other opponents.

In the "Mad Magazine" universe, Jughead's doppelgänger is nicknamed Bottleneck. Bottleneck wears a beanie that resembles a broken bottleneck. His best friend (and fellow juvenile delinquent) is Starchie.

=== Miniseries ===
Jughead's Time Police was a series that began in 1990 featuring Jughead as a hero of the 29th century and a member of the Time Police, an organization that ensures history to remain the same for the future's sake. In this series, the beanie gives Jughead the ability to time travel by thinking. With his supervisor, Marshal January McAndrews, Jughead repairs disturbances in the past. The series was rebooted in 2019, with Jughead building a time machine to undo the mistakes he has made, forcing January McAndrews to intervene.

Other spin-offs include Jughead's Diner in 1990, where he ran a diner with an eclectic cast of patrons; and Jughead's Fantasy, resulting from Jughead's Folly, lasted for three issues and featured Jughead's dreams of various alter-egos, including "Sir Jugalot", "Peter Goon--Private Eye", and "Son of Hercules". Jughead also featured in Explorers of the Unknown, playing Squint, a daredevil escape artist.

== Sexuality ==
Jughead is known for his lack of interest in romantic relationships with anyone. Jughead's philosophy on romantic relationships, gained from observing Archie's romantic entanglements, is that dating makes life complicated and costs money that could be spent on hamburgers. Ironically, his apathy toward women often attracts rather than repels them. His most ardent admirer is Ethel Muggs (aka 'Big Ethel'), an awkward but very friendly girl who chases after Jughead at every opportunity, despite Jughead's constant and blunt refusals. Later story-lines showed a decrease in her obsession with him, and even show her dating other guys, making Jughead jealous. Jughead secretly enjoys the attention, although he claims that he puts up with Ethel's company only because she cooks for him. He has shown romantic interest in her on rare occasions, and eventually falls in love with her in the Life With Archie: The Married Life series, where the "Archie Marries Veronica" stories end with Jughead and Ethel's wedding.

In 2016, Jughead's orientation was confirmed to be asexual in the stories of Chip Zdarsky (and later Ryan North and Mark Waid) for the Jughead comics as part of the New Riverdale line. Zdarsky said of his run on the book that "the next writer could make him discover girls or boys or both and that's totally fine. There have been iterations of Jughead over the decades where he has been interested in girls, so there's room to play around if someone was inclined. For me though, I like an asexual Jughead." He later tweeted that he viewed Jughead as "ace and probably demi-romantic, but for the purposes of his teen years, aro." Both Riverdale fans in the asexual community and Cole Sprouse, who portrays Jughead in The CW's Riverdale, have complained of asexual erasure in mainstream television and expressed desire to see the character's asexuality explored. However, Sprouse later noted that the Jughead Zdarsky created is the only asexual version so far. At the same time, he said that Jughead is aromantic in the classic Archie stories, "a different thing [from asexuality] but deserves attention as well."

A group of girls formed the UGAJ (United Girls Against Jughead) in an effort to get him interested in romance, using methods such as computers or food, though ultimately failing.

For his first 40 years or so of the comic, Jughead often claimed to dislike girls, but a shift in societal attitudes has caused later writers and fans to try different ways of explaining this, such as past heartbreak from childhood romance, bad impressions from Veronica and Ethel, and in the 2015 reboot, asexuality. There has never been one consistent canon explanation for Jughead's avoidance of girls and dating. In one story, Jughead declares, "I don't hate girls—I just love food more!" In the story "Phood Phobia", Archie and Dilton Doiley discover a hidden layer to this: it turns out that Jughead is actually nervous around girls, and he turns to food for comfort. When confronted with this, Jughead is stunned; finding out that girls are the reason he enjoys food so much makes him lose his appetite. In another story, when Jughead saw that Miss Grundy was upset on her birthday, he rallied the other students to cheer her up.

In "A Lass From The Past", written by Nate Butler and first appearing in Jughead #5 (April 1988), Jughead explains the reason he does not chase after girls is because of a childhood heartbreak, sustained before he moved to Riverdale. Little Jughead befriended Joani and they had a puppy love relationship. Jughead's family moved to Riverdale and he had to leave Joani behind. Determined to not endure heartbreak again, he swore off girls, keeping little Joani's picture in his wallet as a reminder. That changed when Debbie moved to town (in "Jughead's Journal", written by Rod Ollerenshaw and also first appearing in Jughead #5), and Jughead began to overcome his old heartbreak as they started dating. However, Joani suddenly visits town. Now a young woman, she tells Jughead that she never forgot him and still has a crush on him, and they share their first kiss. Before Jughead decides whether he wants to pursue a relationship with Joani, she leaves him, but with a promise that they will be together again. The comic even had Jughead say, "Sometimes, life is just more interesting than burgers and shakes." For a while, Debbie and Joani formed Jughead's own love triangle, but fans did not like it, so both girls disappeared and Jughead reverted to his classic independent lifestyle. A few years later, a girl named Trula Twyst appeared. She tends to drive Jughead crazy with her ability to predict his next moves, and they developed a love-hate relationship.

Another thread that has run through stories involves a psychic experience he is supposed to have had, caused by an odd pin he wears on his hat. In the early 1990s, Jughead had three girlfriends: Debbie, Joani, and January McAndrews. The latter is Archie's descendant in the future, who starred with Jughead in Jughead's Time Police, a short-lived spinoff comic about their adventures traveling through time.

== Musical interests ==
Jughead was the drummer for The Archies. In one four-part story, which included many flashbacks of Jughead's life, Archie had commented that the reason he'd chosen the position of drummer was that he was too introverted to play at the front of the stage. Another reason was that he could put food in his drums to eat while he played.

He has also professed a love for jazz music, once detailed in an issue of Jughead Magazine where he develops an obsession with an obscure jazz drummer named "Crazy" Willie Jim. After collecting his records, Jughead finally met Jim, who was now very old, ailing and reclusive, playing on a street corner. Jughead convinced Jim that he was trustworthy and they became fast friends. Jim even played with The Archies at one of their gigs. Jim died very soon after, so Jughead sat in with Jim's friends on the corner to play one last, mournful version of "St. James Infirmary Blues".

== Special abilities ==
In spite of his reputation as slow and lazy, Jughead is frequently shown to be extremely intelligent, and often surprises his skeptical friends (notably Reggie Mantle and Veronica Lodge) with his vast knowledge on a wide variety of subjects, including history, Shakespeare, sports, and science. In several issues, Jughead has demonstrated that his IQ is well above average. He is an extremely good student, which exasperates his teachers when he sometimes pays them no attention.

His intelligence varies from story to story. In many cases, he has trouble keeping decent grades, but was once given an award for being the best student in the school. Once, in Little Archie, it was revealed that as a student, Jughead was second only to Dilton Doiley. His intelligence is displayed by his sharp wit, the occasional deep insight, and the odd chance he gets to upstage or outsmart Reggie Mantle. In one issue, Mr. Weatherbee tries to cut down on Jughead's food consumption, only to realize that Jughead's brain stops functioning without massive amounts of food. Professor Flutesnoot implies that Jughead's brain burns all the calories, which keeps him thin.

Jughead is also a talented artist, and refers to his works as his "Dipsy Doodles", which feature in one-page comic strips. Often, what he paints comes to life or becomes a real, three-dimensional object. Another recurring gag, featured in the 1960s, was "Professor Jughead", where he would wear a gown and mortarboard and lecture to his fellow teenagers about subjects he considered relevant. However, the content of the lesson was often nonsensical and useless in real life. Professor Jughead's Loony Laws was a strip in which he presented various dumb laws. One strip explores the fact that Jughead is seldom drawn with his eyes open by noting that Jughead has the unusual ability to "see" with his eyes completely shut, and not see with them open.

In his spare time, he enjoys playing video games, reading comic books, and skateboarding. It was also noted in one issue that he has an interest in Japanese anime and manga as well, with titles such as Sailor Lunar, Dragon Tall 33, Tech Robo, and Tragic Knight Sayearth. In the late 1980s, Jughead became obsessed with the skateboarding subculture, and his interests and taste in fashion were revamped to fit this. A number of short-lived characters were added to the Jughead comics, including his paraplegic African-American crush Anita; blind rival for Ethel's affections Jeff and his guide dog Spike; and heavy metal band The Potholes. However, this makeover only lasted for a few years.

Jughead rarely takes an interest in sports, but has a few unexpected athletic talents. These are often side effects of his other activities. For example, he is a very fast runner due to his constant evasion of Ethel and his determination to be at the front of the lunchline every day. Coach Kleats often tries to recruit him for various school teams, usually without longterm success. Over the years, he has been seen as a basketball player, baseball pitcher, martial artist, swimmer, dancer and gymnast.

Many stories revolve around other characters making comments about Jughead's appetite. One story has Dilton Doiley making calculations to scientifically prove that it's impossible for Jughead to eat the way that he does, and even convinces Pop Tate to cook everything Jughead ate earlier to prove it. When the entire gang isn't paying attention, Jughead ate all the food and ended the story by saying that if they didn't believe it they could make the food and he'd eat it again. Another story has Jughead going against a guy from another group in an eating contest. The rival gang sends a girl to feed Jughead to fill him up the night before in an effort to cheat but he manages to win anyway. In still another, Archie expresses concern over Jughead's eating and lack of exercise, which prompts Reggie to show off lifting a single crate of Pop's bottles over his head. Jughead helps Pop by effortlessly lifting three crates at once and carrying them to the back room, stunning Archie and Reggie. Unnerving them even more, he rips out a stool that Pop said he could take for a souvenir (he was replacing his counter stools later that day) with one hand again with no effort. In that story, he says he eats to get strong, cracking up Archie and Reggie, but they change their mind when they see he's very strong, and even take up eating in an effort to get strong, with no success.

Often, when Jughead attempts to join a team, he ends up with an undesirable menial task, such as water-boy or equipment manager. However, he often takes part in less strenuous school activities, such as the school newspaper, the Blue and Gold. His reputation as a food critic and his unbiased views of the school teams make him a valuable member of the staff. In some stories, Jughead has been shown to have supernatural abilities that are never seen again. These include controlling weather, giving the evil-eye, learning the skills presented in any book he reads, and predicting the future.

In the "Super Teens" stories (where several of the main Archie characters are secretly superheroes), Jughead could become Captain Hero, gaining a caped costume and more muscular physique (varying from story to story), but retaining his crown-shaped cap. Captain Hero appeared when Jughead recites the magic incantation (similar to Green Lantern's oath):

"Teeny weeny magic beanie pointing towards in the sky; give me muscle, power, vigor - form a super guy!"

Captain Hero often seemed to possess just the right powers for the problem at hand. These were never completely defined, but he maintained certain "stock" superhuman powers, such as flight, enhanced strength and resistance to injury. Early on, Captain Hero was often the most serious and competent of the Super Teens, and the others would defer to his leadership, in contrast to Jughead's perceived status as Archie's sidekick and a generally lazy individual.

== Hot Dog ==
Jughead and Hot Dog

Hot Dog is a long-haired mutt who resembles a white Old English Sheepdog. He belongs to Jughead, although when he first appeared in Pep Comics #224 (December 1968), he belonged to Archie. Hot Dog switched owners frequently in his early appearances, but was eventually given a permanent home with Jughead.

Hot Dog usually thinks like a human, in that his thoughts are presented in thought bubbles. He is lazy, constantly hungry, and, much like Jughead, has a dislike for Reggie Mantle.

Hot Dog is usually considered a member of Archie's Gang. He tends to be attracted to Veronica Lodge's pedigreed dogs, and even had a litter of puppies with one of them, a poodle named Lucretia, much to Veronica's chagrin. In the 1970s series Sabrina the Teenage Witch, Hot Dog has a sidekick, Chili Dog, who is smaller and red-haired. A running gag is the two dogs' "battles" with Sabrina's cat Salem Saberhagen. In the alternate universe limited series Jughead's Pal, Hot Dog, when Jughead's family objects to Hot Dog living indoors because he is covered in dirt, Dilton Doiley builds Hot Dog a doghouse full of whimsical inventions. Hot Dog's sidekick in that short-lived series is a chihuahua named Pablito.

=== In other media ===
In the Filmation animated series The Archie Show, Hot Dog is the mascot for The Archies and is often portrayed as pretending to "conduct" the band.

Hot Dog appears in Archie's Weird Mysteries, once again as Jughead's dog. In this continuity, however, Jughead is shown to own multiple pets, so he isn't seen very often. Sometimes, Hot Dog is affected by the surreal occurrences that plague Riverdale. For instance, in the episode "Twisted Youth", he is transformed back into a puppy as a result of drinking some age-reversing water.

== Other versions ==
=== Life with Archie: The Married Life ===
Jughead appears in the 2010 Life with Archie: The Married Life. In this series, Jughead has taken over Pop's from Pop Tate and has renamed it Jughead's, which later spanned a franchise in each respective universe. He ended up abandoning the franchise to operate the original shoppe in Riverdale. In this series, he ends up marrying Midge Klump in one universe, and Ethel in the other.

=== Afterlife with Archie ===
Jughead appears in the first issue of 2013's Afterlife with Archie before being bitten by a resurrected Hot Dog, which transforms him into a zombie. He is referred to as "Patient Zero" in terms of being the first one affected. However, the eighth issue reveals that Jughead is a ghost and his soul is no longer in his body; whatever is controlling his corpse isn't him.

=== Jughead: The Hunger ===
In this 2017 Archie Horror spin-off, Jughead is a werewolf responsible for a number of murders in Riverdale and becomes known as "The Riverdale Ripper". He and Archie realize he's a werewolf after he murders Dilton during a full moon. The next day, Betty reveals that he comes from a long line of lycanthropes dating back to medieval England and that her ancestors have always been there to stop them. Not wanting Betty to murder his friend, Archie suggests going to the botanical gardens to cure Jughead with Wolfsbane. This works for a couple of months, but after it wears off and Jughead murders Reggie in his wolf state, he leaves town with Hot Dog as he knows Betty wouldn't give him a second chance.

== In other media ==
=== Animated ===
- Jughead appeared in The Archie Show, a 1968 animated series produced by Filmation. He also appeared in the various spin-offs produced in the same format. He was voiced by Howard Morris.
- Jughead appeared in the animated video for "Sugar, Sugar", by The Archies, as the band's drummer.
- Jughead was featured in a Filmation-animated segment for Sesame Street spotlighting the letter J.
- A short-lived show in the 1970s, Archie's TV Funnies, featured other comic strip characters, such as Broom-Hilda and Smokey Stover. Archie introduced each educational short, like a lesson on the importance of bathing from Nancy and Sluggo.
- Another show, The U.S. of Archie, depicted Archie and the gang as themselves in different historical eras. The goal was to teach history.
- Jughead appeared in The New Archies, a 1987 re-imagining of Archie and the gang. Jughead was portrayed as a pre-teen in junior high. He was voiced by Michael Fantini.
- Jughead appeared in Archie's Weird Mysteries, voiced by Chris Lundquist.
- In The Simpsons, Jughead, Moose, Archie, and Reggie made a cameo beating up Homer Simpson in "Sideshow Bob Roberts".

=== Live-action ===
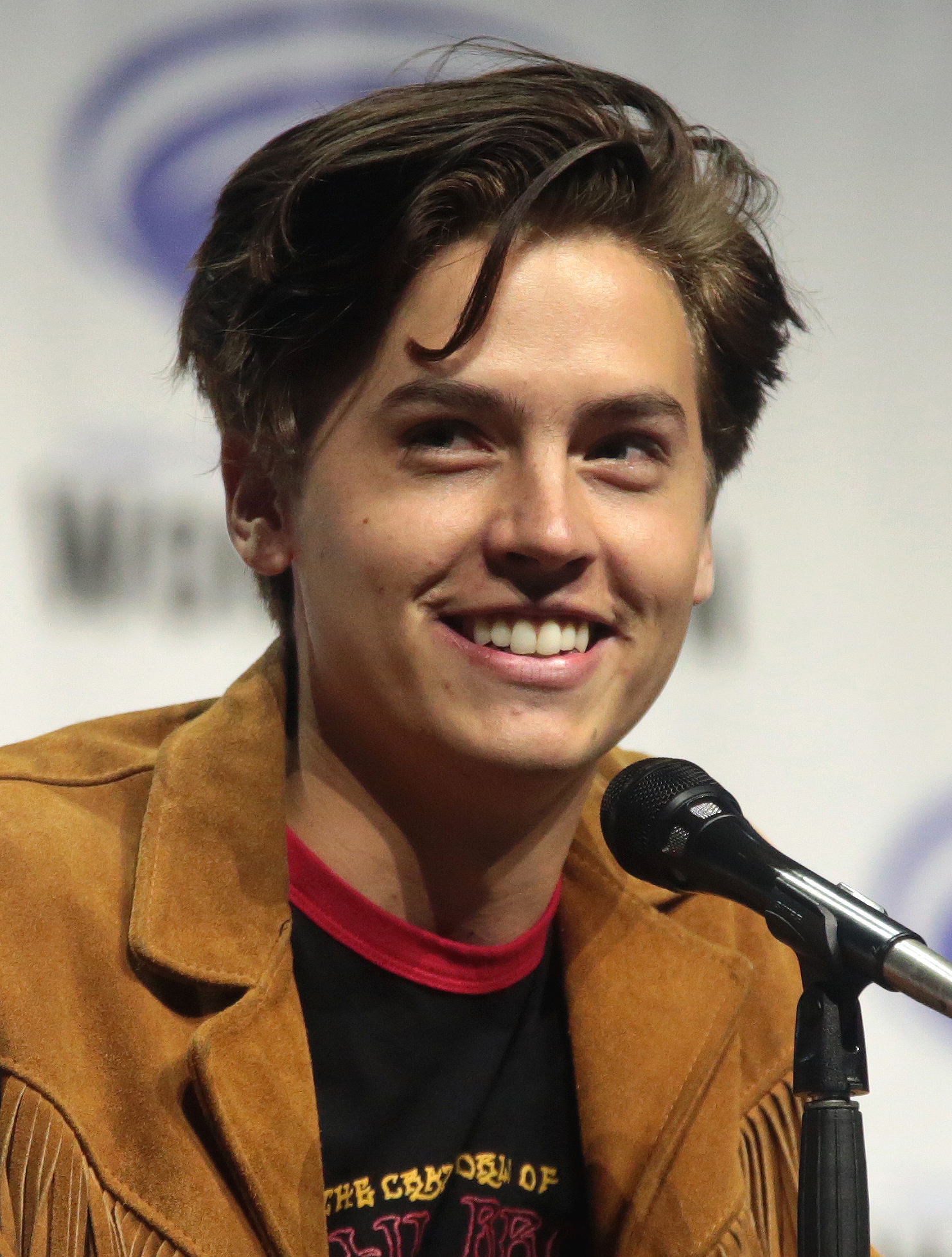
Cole Sprouse plays Jughead on Riverdale.

- Derrel Maury played Jughead in "Archie", a 1976 episode of the ABC Saturday Comedy Special; this was intended to be the pilot for a new series, which never materialized. He reprised this role in the 1978 TV-movie The Archie Situation Comedy Musical Variety Show.
- Jughead appears in Archie: To Riverdale and Back Again, a 1990 TV movie which was broadcast on NBC, portrayed by Sam Whipple. Set fifteen years after his graduation from high school, the movie depicts Jughead as a psychiatrist who owns a successful private practice outside of Riverdale. He is also divorced and raising his young son Jordon on his own, who Archie jokingly refers to as Jughead Junior.
- Jughead appears in Sgt. Kabukiman N.Y.P.D., a 1990 parody superhero comedy film created by Troma Entertainment, portrayed by Brick Bronsky.
- Jughead is a main character in Riverdale, a drama series on The CW, where he is portrayed by Cole Sprouse. This version of Jughead is markedly different from the comic character, exhibiting a darker, moodier demeanor and is not overly obsessed with food, eating normally like most people. In the show, Jughead wears an ordinary dark gray knitted hat with points and pins, but appears in a dream sequence wearing his distinctive crown cap and "S" sweatshirt. His mother and sister are mentioned but absent (until Season 3), having left for Toledo due to his father's drinking. His father, F.P., is leader of the Southside Serpents, and Jughead, choosing not to live with him, is homeless. In the first-season finale, the Serpents offer Jughead one of their jackets, essentially making him an honorary member. In the second season, he undergoes an initiation that includes a brutal beating to become a full-fledged member. Over time, he becomes a de facto leader of the teenagers in the gang, and in the second-season finale, after he attempts to save the Serpents from a fight with a rival gang that badly outnumbers them by trading himself, F.P. retires and names him as his successor.

== Notes ==
=== References ===
- Erickson, Hal (2005). Television Cartoon Shows. Vol. 1 (2nd ed.). McFardland and Company. ISBN 07864-2255-6.
