= Archie Andrews =

Comic book character

- Archie Comics character
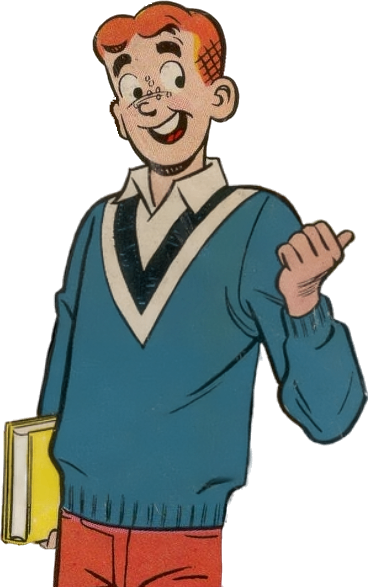
- Archie drawn by Samm Schwartz in 1964
- First appearance: Pep Comics #22 (December 1941)
- Created by: John L. Goldwater; Bob Montana; Vic Bloom
- Voiced by: Charles Mullen (1943–1944); Jack Grimes (1944); Burt Boyar (1945); Bob Hastings (1945–1953); Dallas McKennon (1968–1976); J Michael Roncetti (1987); Andrew Rannells (1999–2002)
- Portrayed by: KJ Apa (2017–2023); Christopher Rich (1990); Brock Brown (Riverdale; young); Agastya Nanda (The Archies); Dennis Bowen (1976)
- Hometown: Riverdale
- School: Riverdale High School

In-universe information
- Full name: Archibald Andrews
- Nickname: Archie
- Family: Fred Andrews (father); Mary Andrews (mother)
- Significant others: Veronica Lodge; Betty Cooper; Cheryl Blossom; Valerie Brown; Midge Klump; Toni Topaz; Ginger Lopez; Tina Patel; Sabrina Spellman; Josie McCoy
- Relatives: Artie Andrews (grandfather); Bernice Andrews (grandmother); Alistair Andrews (cousin); Frank Andrews (uncle)

Archibald "Archie" Andrews is the main character in the Archie Comics franchise, created in 1941 by publisher John L. Goldwater and artist Bob Montana in collaboration with writer Vic Bloom. His appearances include the long-running Archie Andrews radio series, a syndicated comic strip, The Archie Show, Archie's Weird Mysteries, and Riverdale. With the creation of Archie Andrews, publisher John Goldwater hoped to appeal to fans of the Andy Hardy films starring Mickey Rooney. Archie Andrews is the rhythm guitarist and one of the three singers of the fictional band The Archies. He is portrayed by KJ Apa on Riverdale and Agastya Nanda in The Archies. For his physical appearance, he has red hair, freckles on his cheeks, and light-colored skin. In Archie's Weird Mysteries, he appears to be of Scottish-American descent, as shown in the episode "The Day the Earth Moved", when his father wanted to keep with their family tradition and wear a kilt while ringing the bell of Riverdale.

== Character ==
=== Creation ===
Archie Andrews debuted in Pep Comics #22 (cover-dated Dec. 1941). The Little Archie series, published from 1956 through the mid-1990s, chronicles the adventures of pre-teen Archie and his friends while in elementary school.

=== Concept ===
Archie is a typical small-town teenager, who lives in Riverdale, where he attends Riverdale High School. He is extremely clumsy and can make some dumb mistakes, but always has the best of intentions. He forms a crush on rich girl Veronica Lodge, but also loves his next-door neighbour, Betty Cooper, forming the love triangle driving many of the comic's plot lines. Archie is one of the three vocalists and the rhythm guitarist of his band, The Archies, along with Betty and Veronica, his best friend Jughead Jones, as well as his nemesis Reggie Mantle, who battles Archie for Betty and Veronica's affections. Archie often comes into conflict with Veronica's rich father, Hiram Lodge, and Riverdale High's principal, Waldo Weatherbee.

=== Biography ===
He is the only child of Mary and Fred Andrews. His father works as a mid-level business executive. His mother, initially a homemaker, takes a job at a real estate agency in later years. Mary and Fred Andrews are of Scottish descent. Archie's paternal grandfather, Andy Andrews, immigrated to the United States from Scotland and befriended Moose Mason's Russian ancestor, who had emigrated at the same time. Archie has been depicted wearing the traditional kilt of his ancestors and playing bagpipes (but not very well). His childhood is featured in the "Little Archie" stories, where he had a dog named Spotty.

Outside of dating, Archie largely enjoys sports. He plays baseball, basketball, and football for the Riverdale High teams. Though often not as good an athlete as Moose Mason, Chuck Clayton or Reggie Mantle, he proves a valuable member of the school team. Coaches Kleats and Clayton value him for both his athletic abilities and his team spirit. However, Archie's athletic abilities vary from story to story, due to his frequent clumsiness. He also has a tendency to pay more attention to cheerleaders than to his playing. For this reason, Coach Kleats often tries to avoid resorting to use Archie in a game.

Issue 238 of Life With Archie from 1983, in which Archie's jalopy is destroyed

Automobiles are one of Archie's hobbies, and he is passionate about his car. For decades, he was shown driving a 1916 Ford Model T jalopy called "Betsy". In Archie double digest No. 192, it is said to be a Model A. In a story during which Archie tried to have his jalopy insured, he described it as being a "Ford, Chevy, Plymouth, Pierce-Arrow, Packard, DeSoto, Hudson ..." explaining that his jalopy was "a collection of replacement parts from several junkyards", some of which dated back to 1926.

Archie's jalopy was destroyed permanently in issue No. 238 of Life With Archie, which was published in 1983. In the newer comics, he drives a mid-1960s' Ford Mustang, which is more contemporary in appearance, but still unreliable and prone to breakdowns. Archie Digest 239, published in October 2007, included a new story in which the one and only Mr. Lodge owned an antique car that had a strong resemblance to Archie's jalopy. The story featured Archie's grandfather who, as a teenager, looked and dressed like Archie from the 1940s. It turned out that he owned the same jalopy that Mr. Lodge now owned.

==== Death ====
In April 2014, 72 years after the character's first appearance, Archie Comics announced that the adult Archie would die in the July 2014 issue (#36) of Life with Archie, while the teenage Archie would continue in the other Archie comic series titles. Archie dies when he is shot in the abdomen while saving his friend, Senator Kevin Keller. The story is written so as to terminate both storylines, without committing to which girl Archie married, and contains several flashbacks to the Little Archie days. The final issue (#37) is set one year after Archie's death. All his friends memorialize him, and Riverdale High School is officially renamed Archie Andrews High School in his honor. The story ends with Jughead, owner of Juggie's (formerly Pop's Chock'lit Shoppe), serving a sundae to three children who resemble Little Archie, Betty, and Veronica.

== Relationships ==
Archie Andrews as he appears in Archie No. 1 (July 2015).

=== Romances ===
Archie and Betty have been best friends and love interests all their lives. When Veronica Lodge moved to Riverdale, however, he switched his attention to her, making Betty both angry and jealous. She began competing with Veronica for his affection.

In the comics, he sometimes thinks of Betty more as a close friend and confidante. He likes that she is always available as a back-up when he does not have a date with Veronica.

He dislikes it when Betty dates other boys, even to the extent of neglecting Veronica to win Betty back. Now that Betty sporadically dates Jason Blossom and Adam Chisholm, Archie shows a tinge of jealousy. Archie is married to Betty in Archie Marries Betty: Life With Archie series and is married to Veronica in Archie Marries Veronica: Life with Archie series. Both scenarios produce different outcomes for Archie's overall life, as well as Betty's and Veronica's.

Archie often competes for the attention of Betty and Veronica with his rival, Reggie Mantle, and occasionally other boys. Veronica keeps Archie guessing, never letting him take her for granted. Betty, on the other hand, clearly lets Archie know she adores him. Archie chooses to keep fighting for Veronica.

A third love interest is a wealthy red-headed girl named Cheryl Blossom. At first, she was deemed too sexual and a bit promiscuous and was taken out of the series, but due to her popularity, she was brought back in Love Showdown, a four-part mini-series in which Archie attempts to make a decision between Cheryl, Betty, and Veronica.

In Archie No. 608 (May 2010), Archie began a relationship with Valerie Brown, making her Archie's first girlfriend of African descent. The Archies and Josie and the Pussycats were touring together and, while rehearsing, Archie and Valerie secretly fell in love as they co-wrote the song "More Than Words" that described their feelings. Issue No. 609 revealed that this relationship had seeped into common knowledge by the end of the tour. Archie and Valerie were forced apart when the Pussycats were touring Europe without the Archies, but hoped to keep their relationship going. In the comic Archie Marries Valerie, Valerie is expecting a baby with Archie, whom they name Star.

In Archie No. 700 (July 2019), which signifies the start of another soft reboot, it is revealed that Archie got into a relationship with Sabrina Spellman over his summer break while everyone was on vacation after she had saved him from a pack of wolves.

==== 'Archie Marries' issues ====
On May 15, 2009, Archie Comics announced that Archie would finally pick one of the girls to marry, in a story arc in Archie #600–606 (Aug. 2009 – Feb. 2010). However, Archie Comics publicly revealed this to be a dream sequence to show two possible futures: one where Archie marries Veronica (issues 600–602), and the other Betty (603–605). In both, he has twins: a boy also named Archie who looks like him, and a girl named after and resembling whichever girl he married. Issue 606 was an epilogue to Archie Marries Veronica/Archie Marries Betty that returns to the comics' old format.

=== Friends ===
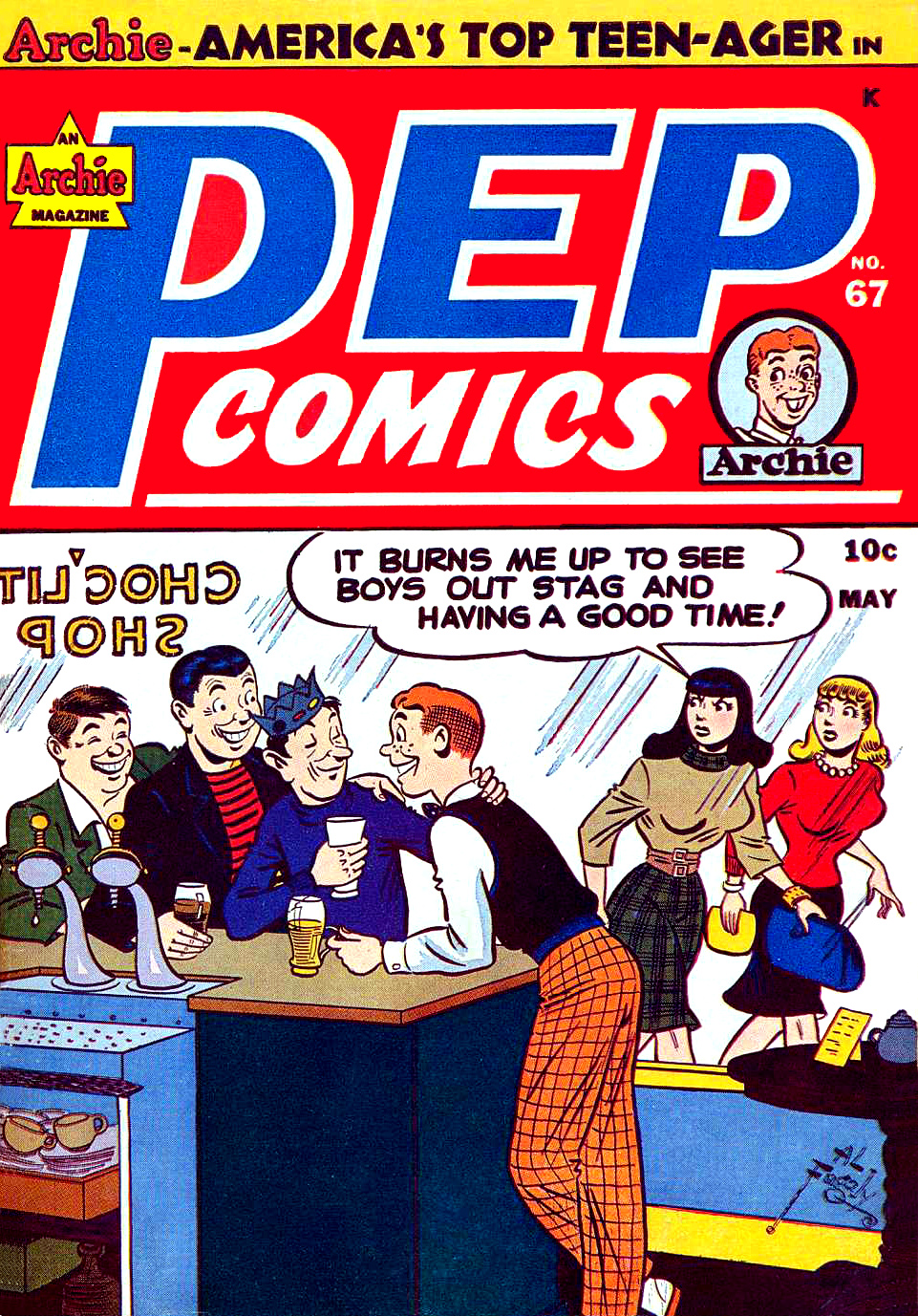
Archie and the gang on the cover of Pep number 67 (May 1948), artwork by Al Fagaly.

Jughead Jones has been Archie's best friend ever since childhood. When Jughead first came to Riverdale, he was in a bad mood and tended to dismiss Archie. However, Archie, of good heart, tried to cheer up Jughead and the two have been inseparable ever since. Jughead wears a trademark clubhouse beanie (a Depression-era style of makeshift hatwear, crafted from an inverted fedora with a scallop-cut brim, and decorated with assorted pinbacks) and an inscrutable, closed-eyelid expression. Often Jughead has to help Archie out from a tricky situation. Jughead usually knows when Archie's ideas will not work, but is powerless to avoid getting involved.

Reggie Mantle is Archie's constant romantic and athletic rival. Each often makes attempts to separate the other from Veronica, occasionally exhibiting physical violence, and both have won their fair share of scrapes with each other. Reggie takes every opportunity to play practical jokes on Archie and make cynical wisecracks. However, Reggie is often shown as a companion to and of Archie despite his arrogance and competitive nature, and they are often seen together practicing athletics or pursuing dates.

Archie's other friends include Dilton Doiley, the local genius who gets Archie into and out of trouble through his experiments and inventions; Moose Mason, the dim-witted but likable star athlete of Riverdale High who is often Archie's teammate; Chuck Clayton, another of Archie's teammates who was originally shy and reclusive but came out of his shell when Archie befriended him; Moose and Chuck's girlfriends Midge Klump and Nancy Woods, two of the very few attractive girls Archie does not fall for; and Ethel Muggs, a girl with an enormous crush on Jughead, who often wins his heart with the use of fresh-baked cookies.

==== The Archies ====
The Archies is a garage band containing Archie (vocals and rhythm guitar), Reggie (bass), Veronica (vocals and keyboards), Betty (vocals, lead guitar and percussion), and Jughead (drums). Archie founded the group himself. Although not as famous as Josie and the Pussycats, the band plays numerous gigs and has some notoriety. In the Little Archies series, the band just starts to form, although Archie, Betty, Jughead, Reggie, and Veronica start to play different kind of songs.

== Appearances ==
=== Radio ===
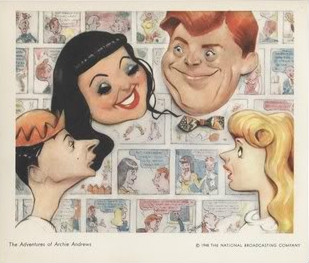
Archie and cast: The Adventures of Archie Andrews, 1947.

Montana's characters were heard on radio in the early 1940s. Archie Andrews began on the NBC Blue Network on May 31, 1943, switched to Mutual in 1944, and then continued on NBC radio from 1945 until September 5, 1953. The program's original announcer was Kenneth Banghart, later succeeded by Bob Shepard (during the 1947–48 season, when Swift and Company sponsored the program) and Dick Dudley. Archie was first played by Charles Mullen (1943–1944), Jack Grimes (1944) and Burt Boyar (1945), with Bob Hastings (1945–1953) as the title character during the NBC years. Jughead was portrayed by Hal Stone, Cameron Andrews and later by Arnold Stang. Stone later wrote about his radio career in his autobiography, Relax... Archie! Re-laxx! (Bygone Days Press, 2003). During the NBC run, Rosemary Rice portrayed Betty, Gloria Mann portrayed Veronica, Alice Yourman portrayed Archie's mother, Mary Andrews and Arthur "Art" Kohl was Archie's father, Fred Andrews.

=== Television ===
==== Animation ====
Archie Andrews in The Archie Show.

- Archie Andrews appeared in The Archie Show, a 1968 cartoon series produced by Filmation. He also appeared in the various spin-offs produced in the same format from 1969 through 1977: Archie's TV Funnies, The U.S. of Archie, and others. He was voiced by Dallas McKennon.
- Archie Andrews appeared in The New Archies, a 1987 re-imagining of Archie and the gang. Archie was portrayed as a pre-teen in junior high. He was voiced by J. Michael Roncetti.
- Archie Andrews appeared in Archie's Weird Mysteries, voiced by Andrew Rannells. This version is a reporter for the local school newspaper.

Archie Andrews in Archie's Weird Mysteries

==== Live-action ====
- In 1962, Desilu produced an unaired pilot with Frank Bank as Archie.
- In 1964, Harry Ackerman produced an unaired pilot for Screen Gems with unknown actor John Simpson in the title role.
- In 1976, Archie, a pilot for a proposed sitcom aired on ABC with Dennis Bowen as Archie Andrews, Gordon Jump as Mr. Andrews, Audrey Landers as Betty, Hilary Thompson as Veronica, and Whit Bissell as Mr. Lodge.
- In 1978, The Archie Situation Comedy Musical Variety Show with the same cast as the 1976 pilot, appeared on ABC, which, like the previous pilot, was not picked up.
- Archie was portrayed by Christopher Rich in the 1990 television film (and subsequent comic book), Archie: To Riverdale and Back Again. In the film, he is depicted as a successful lawyer with a fiancé named Pam, poised to move out of Riverdale and into the big city. However, upon attending his fifteen-year high school reunion, his old feelings for both Veronica and Betty start to reemerge.
- Archie appears in Riverdale, a drama series for The CW with KJ Apa starring as the character. Brock Brown plays the young Archie in the series' fourth season episode "Chapter Seventy-Five: Lynchian" and in some flashbacks shown in the sixth season.

=== Film ===
==== Animation ====
- Archie Andrews appeared in The Archies in JugMan, voiced by Andrew Rannells. The film was released direct-to-video and takes place after Archie's Weird Mysteries.

==== Live-action ====
- Archie appears in film adaptation appearance in The Archies on Netflix. He is portrayed by Agastya Nanda.

=== Games ===
- Archie appears as a character in the mobile game Crossy Road.
