= Stone Sour discography =

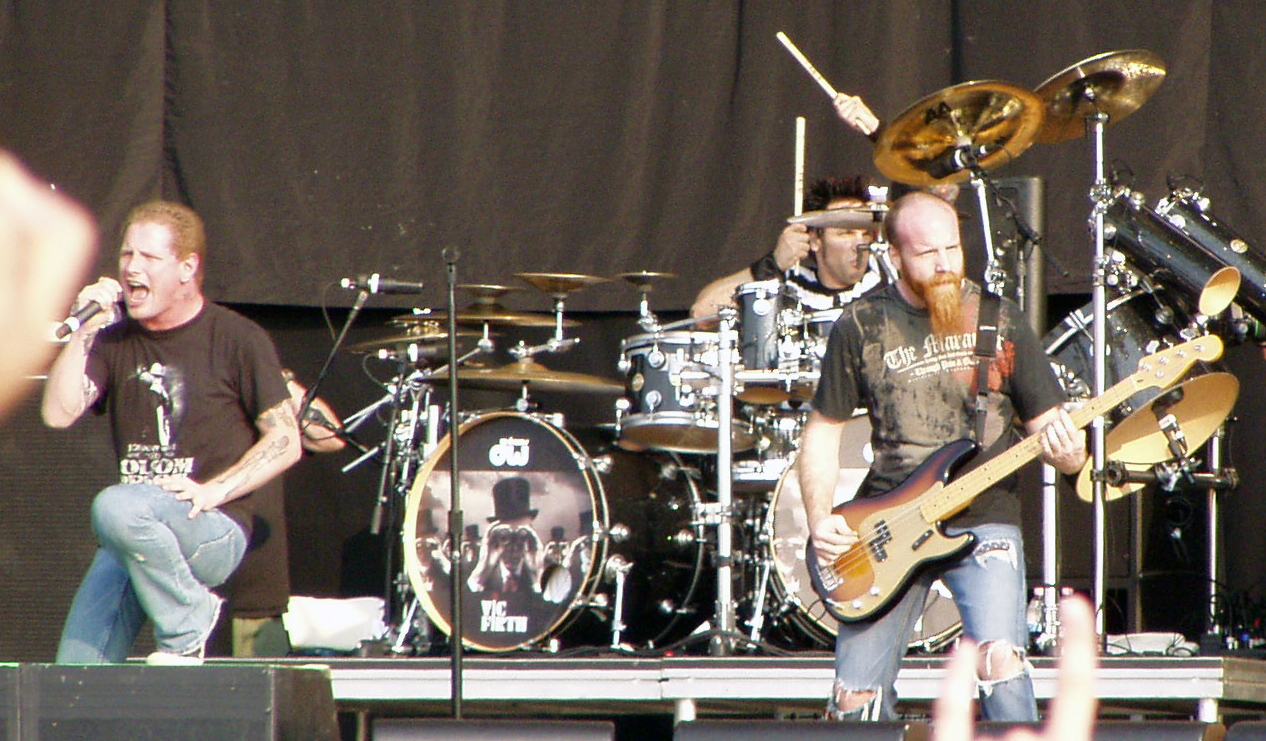
- Stone Sour performing at the Heineken Jammin' Festival on June 14, 2007. From left to right: Corey Taylor, Roy Mayorga and Shawn Economaki. Not pictured: Jim Root and Josh Rand.
- Studio albums: 6
- Extended plays: 3
- Live albums: 1
- Singles: 22
- Music videos: 24

The American rock band Stone Sour has released six studio albums, one live album and twenty-two singles. The band has also released twenty-four music videos. Stone Sour formed in Des Moines, Iowa in 1992 but did not release an album until 2002. The band comprises vocalist Corey Taylor, guitarists Christian Martucci and Josh Rand, drummer Roy Mayorga, and bassist Johny Chow. Longtime members Joel Ekman, Shawn Economaki and Jim Root left the band in 2006, 2011 and 2014, respectively. Martucci and Chow were first featured with the band on the Burbank Duology. Hydrograd is the first album to feature Christian Martucci and Johny Chow since each joining the band in 2014 and 2012, respectively.

== Albums ==
=== Studio albums ===
List of studio albums, with selected chart positions and certifications
Title	Album details	Peak chart positions										Certifications
Title	Album details	US	AUS	FRA	GER	IRL	NLD	NZ	SWE	SWI	UK	Certifications
Stone Sour	Released: August 27, 2002; Label: Roadrunner; Formats: CD, digital download	46	—	131	94	—	—	—	—	—	41	RIAA: Gold; BPI: Gold
Come What(ever) May	Released: August 1, 2006; Label: Roadrunner; Formats: CD, digital download	4	21	56	18	33	33	31	30	25	27	RIAA: Platinum; ARIA: Gold; BPI: Gold; MC: Gold; RMNZ: Gold
Audio Secrecy	Released: September 7, 2010; Label: Roadrunner; Formats: CD, LP, digital download	6	6	29	3	19	16	12	10	7	6	BPI: Silver
House of Gold & Bones – Part 1	Released: October 22, 2012; Label: Roadrunner; Formats: CD, LP, digital download	7	13	58	7	30	30	12	12	8	13	
House of Gold & Bones – Part 2	Released: April 9, 2013; Label: Roadrunner; Formats: CD, LP, digital download	10	4	71	3	49	47	6	25	6	11	
Hydrograd	Released: June 30, 2017; Label: Roadrunner; Formats:CD, LP, digital download	8	2	97	4	42	40	6	34	4	5	
"—" denotes a recording that did not chart or was not released in that territory.

=== Live albums ===
List of live albums
Title	Album details
Live in Moscow	Released: August 14, 2007; Label: Roadrunner; Formats: Digital download
Hello, You Bastards: Live in Reno	Released: December 13, 2019; Label: Cooking Vinyl; Formats: CD, LP, digital download

=== Extended plays ===
List of extended plays
Title	Album details	Peak chart positions
Title	Album details	US
Meanwhile in Burbank...	Released: April 18, 2015; Label: Roadrunner; Formats: EP	78
Straight Outta Burbank...	Released: November 27, 2015; Label: Roadrunner; Formats: EP	—
Hydrograd Acoustic Sessions	Released: April 21, 2018; Label: Roadrunner; Formats: EP	—
"—" denotes a recording that did not chart.

=== Video albums ===
List of video albums
Title	Album details
Live at Brighton	Released: 2012; Label: Roadrunner; Formats: DVD

== Singles ==
List of singles, with selected chart positions, showing year released and album name
Title	Year	Peak chart positions										Certifications	Album
Title	Year	US	US Adult	US Alt.	US Main. Rock	AUS	BEL (FL)	GER	NLD	NZ	UK	Certifications	Album
"Get Inside"	2002	—	—	—	—	—	—	—	—	—	—		Stone Sour
"Bother"	2002	56	27	4	2	41	42	—	40	43	28	RIAA: Gold; ARIA: Gold; MC: Gold; RMNZ: Gold	Stone Sour
"Inhale"	2003	—	—	—	18	—	—	—	—	—	63		Stone Sour
"30/30-150"	2006	—	—	—	—	—	—	—	—	—	—		Come What(ever) May
"Through Glass"	2006	39	12	2	1	—	—	95	32	37	98	RIAA: Platinum; ARIA: 2× Platinum; BPI: Gold; MC: 2× Platinum; RMNZ: 2× Platinum	Come What(ever) May
"Sillyworld"	2007	—	—	21	2	—	—	—	—	—	—		Come What(ever) May
"Made of Scars"	2007	—	—	—	12	—	—	—	—	—	—		Come What(ever) May
"Zzyzx Rd."	2007	—	—	—	29	—	—	—	—	—	—		Come What(ever) May
"Mission Statement"	2010	—	—	—	—	—	—	—	—	—	—		Audio Secrecy
"Say You'll Haunt Me"	2010	—^{[A]}	—	8	1	—	—	—	—	—	198		Audio Secrecy
"Digital (Did You Tell)"	2010	—	—	—	16	—	—	—	—	—	—		Audio Secrecy
"Hesitate"	2011	—	25	32	6	—	—	—	—	—	—		Audio Secrecy
"Gone Sovereign"^{[B]}	2012	—	—	—	—	—	—	—	—	—	—		House of Gold & Bones – Part 1
"Absolute Zero"^{[B]}	2012	—	—	28	2	—	—	—	—	—	—	ARIA: Gold; MC: Gold	House of Gold & Bones – Part 1
"Tired"	2013	—	—	—	1	—	—	—	—	—	—		House of Gold & Bones – Part 1
"Do Me a Favor"	2013	—	—	—	4	—	—	—	—	—	—		House of Gold & Bones – Part 2
"The Dark"	2015	—	—	—	—	—	—	—	—	—	—		non-album single
"Song #3"	2017	—	—	—	1	—	—	—	—	—	—	ARIA: Gold; MC: Gold	Hydrograd
"Rose Red Violent Blue (This Song Is Dumb & So Am I)"	2017	—	—	—	10	—	—	—	—	—	—		Hydrograd
"St. Marie"	2018	—	—	—	31	—	—	—	—	—	—		Hydrograd
"Whiplash Pants" (Live)	2019	—	—	—	—	—	—	—	—	—	—		Hello, You Bastards: Live in Reno
"—" denotes a recording that did not chart or was not released in that territory.

== Promotional singles ==
List of singles, showing year released, album name, and certifications
Title	Year	Certifications	Album
"Wicked Game"	2006	ARIA: Gold; RMNZ: Gold	Come (What)ever May
"RU486"	2012		House of Gold & Bones – Part 1
"Fabuless"	2017		Hydrograd
"Taipei Person/Allah Tea"	2017		Hydrograd
"Burn One Turn One"	2018		Hydrograd
"Knievel Has Landed"	2018		Hydrograd
"—" denotes a release that did not register on that chart.

== Music videos ==
Year	Song	Director(s)
2002	"Get Inside"	Hal Carter
2002	"Bother"	Gregory Dark
2003	"Inhale"	Gregory Dark and Corey Taylor
2006	"Reborn"	Unknown
2006	"30/30-150"	P.R. Brown
2006	"Through Glass"	Tony Petrossian
2007	"Sillyworld"	David Brucha
2007	"Made of Scars"	Doug Spangenberg
2009	"Bother" (Live)	Unknown
2010	"Say You'll Haunt Me"	P.R. Brown
2010	"Digital (Did You Tell)"	P.R. Brown
2010	"Hesitate"	P.R. Brown and The Beta Movement
2012	"Gone Sovereign / Absolute Zero" (Lyric)	
2012	"Gone Sovereign / Absolute Zero"	P.R. Brown
2013
2013	"Do Me a Favor" (Lyric)	
2013	"Do Me a Favor"	Phil Mucci
2013	"The Uncanny Valley" (Lyric)	
2013	"Tired"	
2014	"The House of Gold & Bones" (Lyric)	
2015	"The Dark"	
2016	"Zzyzx Rd."	Max Moore
2017	"Fabuless"	P.R. Brown
2017	"Song #3"	Ryan Valdez
2017	"Mercy" (Live from Sphere Studios)	
2017	"Somebody Stole My Eyes" (Live)	
2017	"Song #3" (Acoustic)	
2017	"Rose Red Violent Blue (This Song Is Dumb & So Am I)"	Ryan Valdez
2017	"Taipei Person / Allah Tea" (Live)	
2018	"St. Marie"	Mark Klasfeld
2018	"Burn One Turn One" (Lyric)	
2018	"Miracles" (Acoustic Live)	Zippo Encore
2018	"Knievel Has Landed"	
2018	"Mercy" (Acoustic)	
2018	"Cold Reader" (Live)	Zippo Encore
2019	"Whiplash Pants" (Live)	

== Other appearances ==
List of non-single guest appearances, showing year released and album name
Title	Year	Album
"The Pessimist"	2011	Transformers: Dark of the Moon – The Album
"Bombtrack" (Rage Against the Machine cover)	2017	Metal Hammer Goes '90s

== See also ==
- List of songs recorded by Stone Sour

== Notes ==
- A "Say You'll Haunt Me" did not enter the Billboard Hot 100, but peaked at number 10 on the Bubbling Under Hot 100 Singles chart, which acts as an extension to the Hot 100.
- B "Gone Sovereign" and "Absolute Zero" were released together as a double A-side single on iTunes.
