= List of songs recorded by Stone Sour =

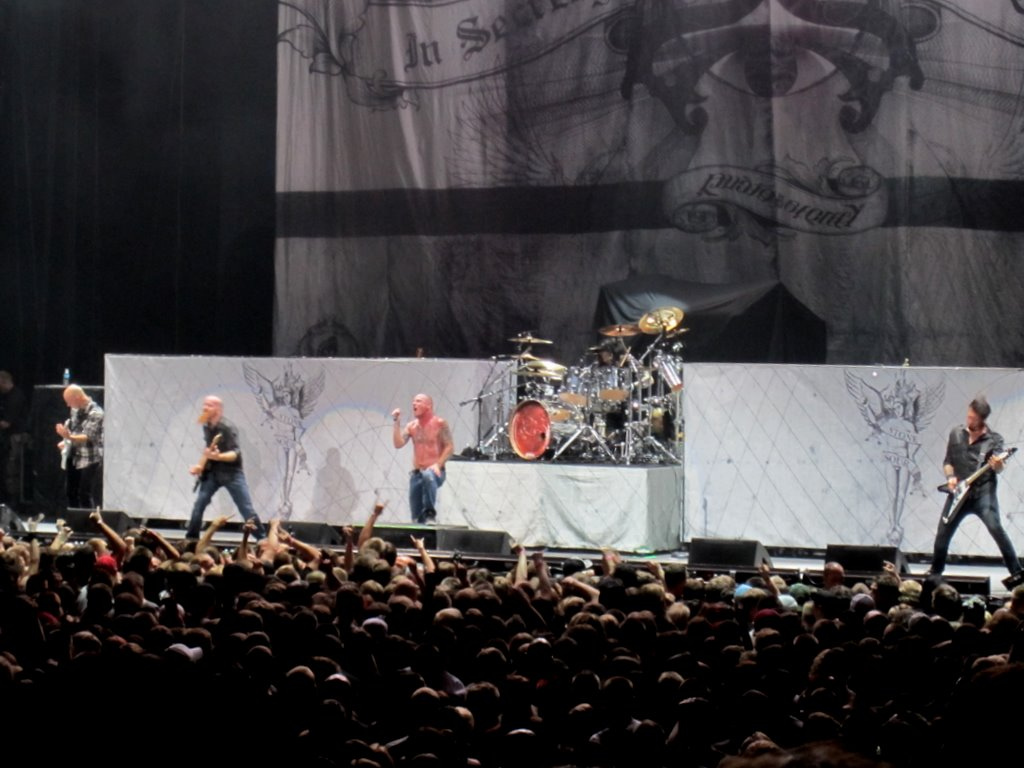
Stone Sour performing in 2010

Stone Sour is an American rock band from Des Moines, Iowa. Originally formed in 1992 by vocalist Corey Taylor, guitarist Josh Rand, bassist Shawn Economaki and drummer Joel Ekman, the band was active until 1997, when Taylor left to join Slipknot. Guitarist Jim Root, who had joined the band later, also joined Slipknot in 1999. Stone Sour reunited several years later, releasing its full-length debut album Stone Sour in 2002 which featured songs from early demos. Ekman was replaced by Roy Mayorga in 2006, who performed on the band's second album Come What(ever) May. The songs on the album were written by Taylor, Root, Rand and Economaki.

The band took regular breaks due to the schedule of Slipknot, but returned in 2010 with third album Audio Secrecy, which featured equal songwriting credits for all five band members. In 2011, the group contributed the song "The Pessimist" to the Transformers: Dark of the Moon soundtrack, before Economaki left the following year. House of Gold & Bones: Part 1 was released later in the year, followed by Part 2 in 2013, both of which featured Rachel Bolan on bass. Root left Stone Sour in late 2013 and was later replaced by Christian Martucci. In 2015, the band released two extended plays (EPs) of cover versions: Meanwhile in Burbank... and Straight Outta Burbank...

== Songs ==
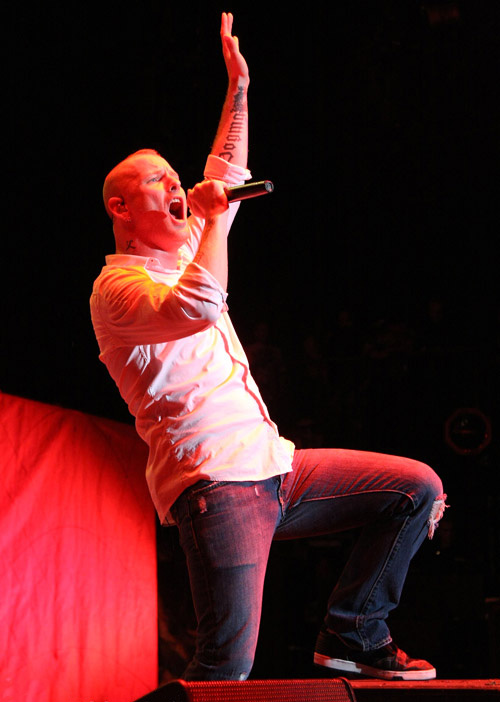
Stone Sour vocalist Corey Taylor has written the majority of the band's lyrics.

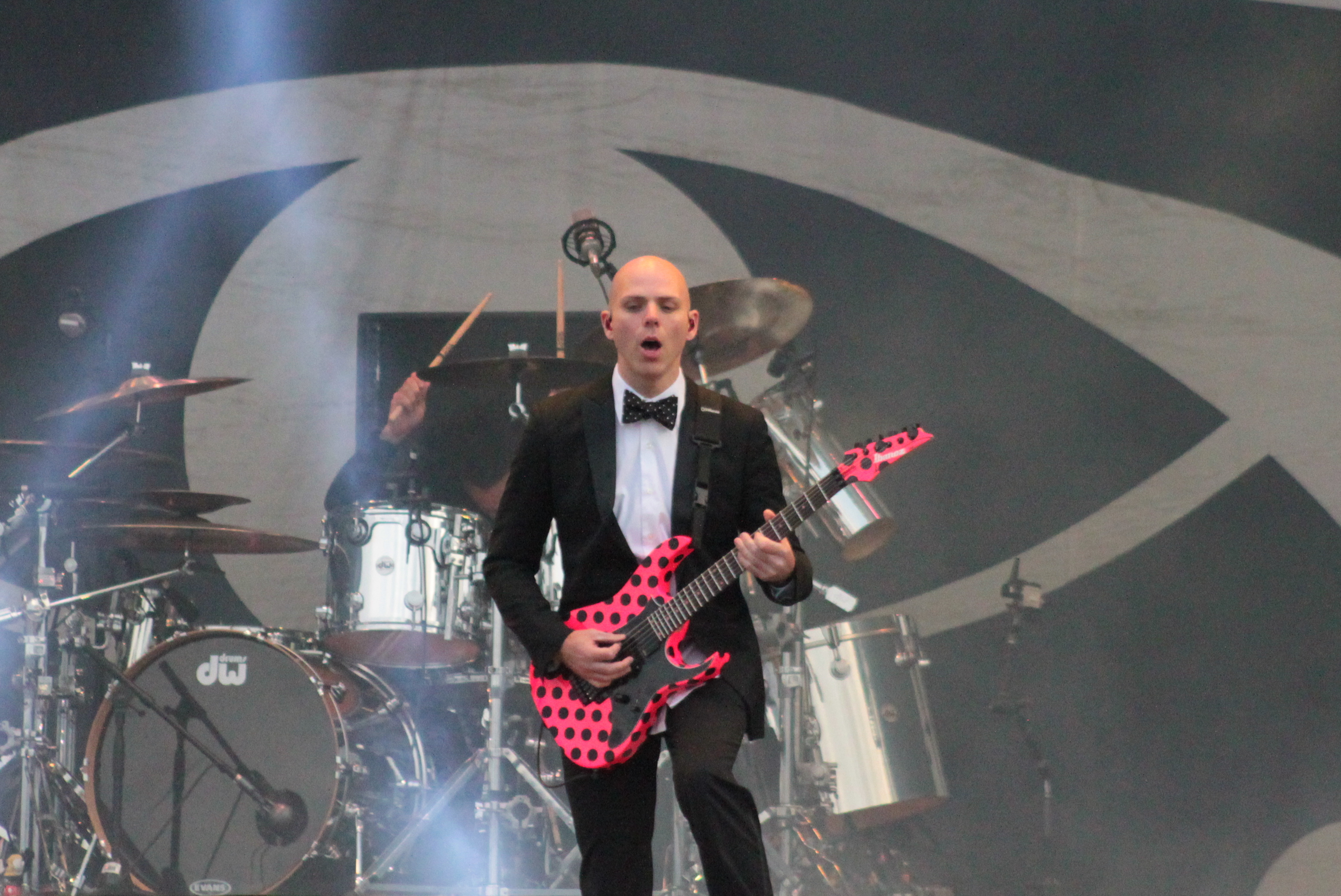
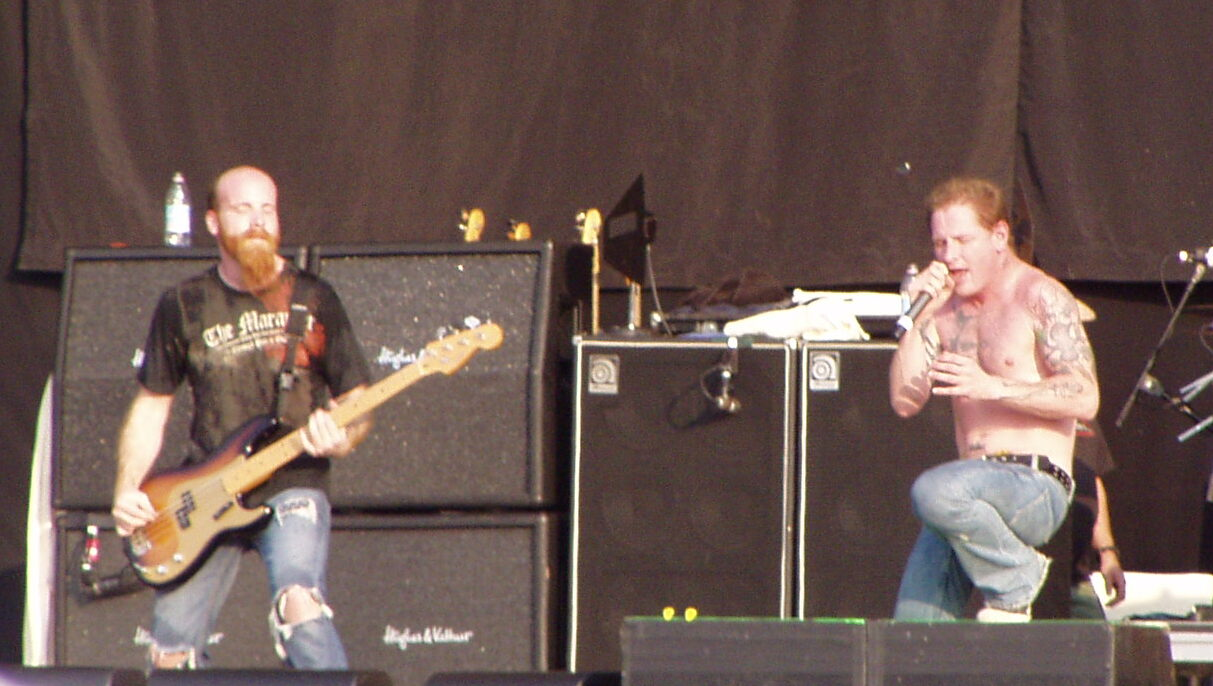
Guitarist Josh Rand (top) and bassist Shawn Economaki (bottom, left) were co-founding members of the band.

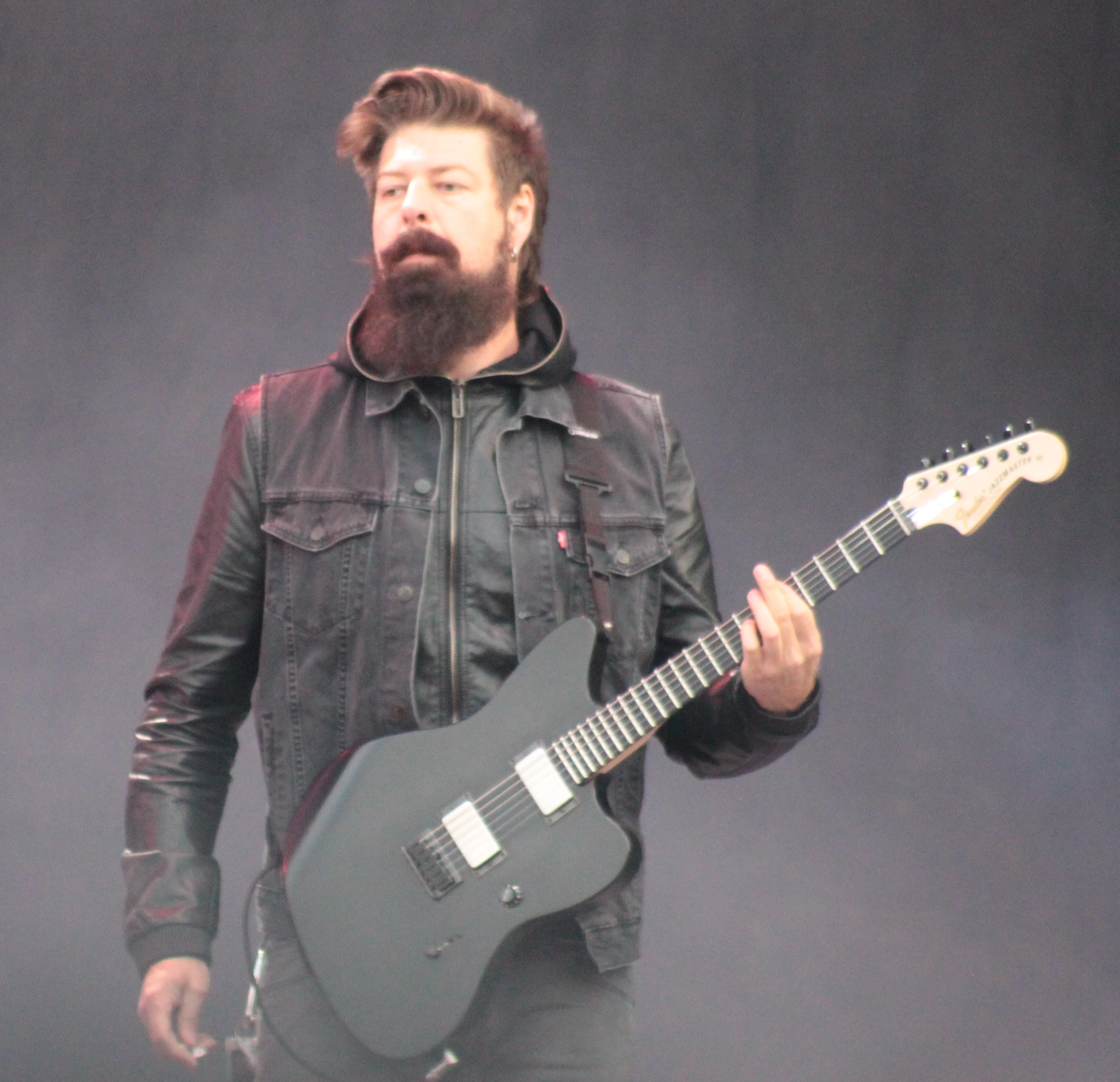
Slipknot guitarist Jim Root was also a member of Stone Sour until 2013.

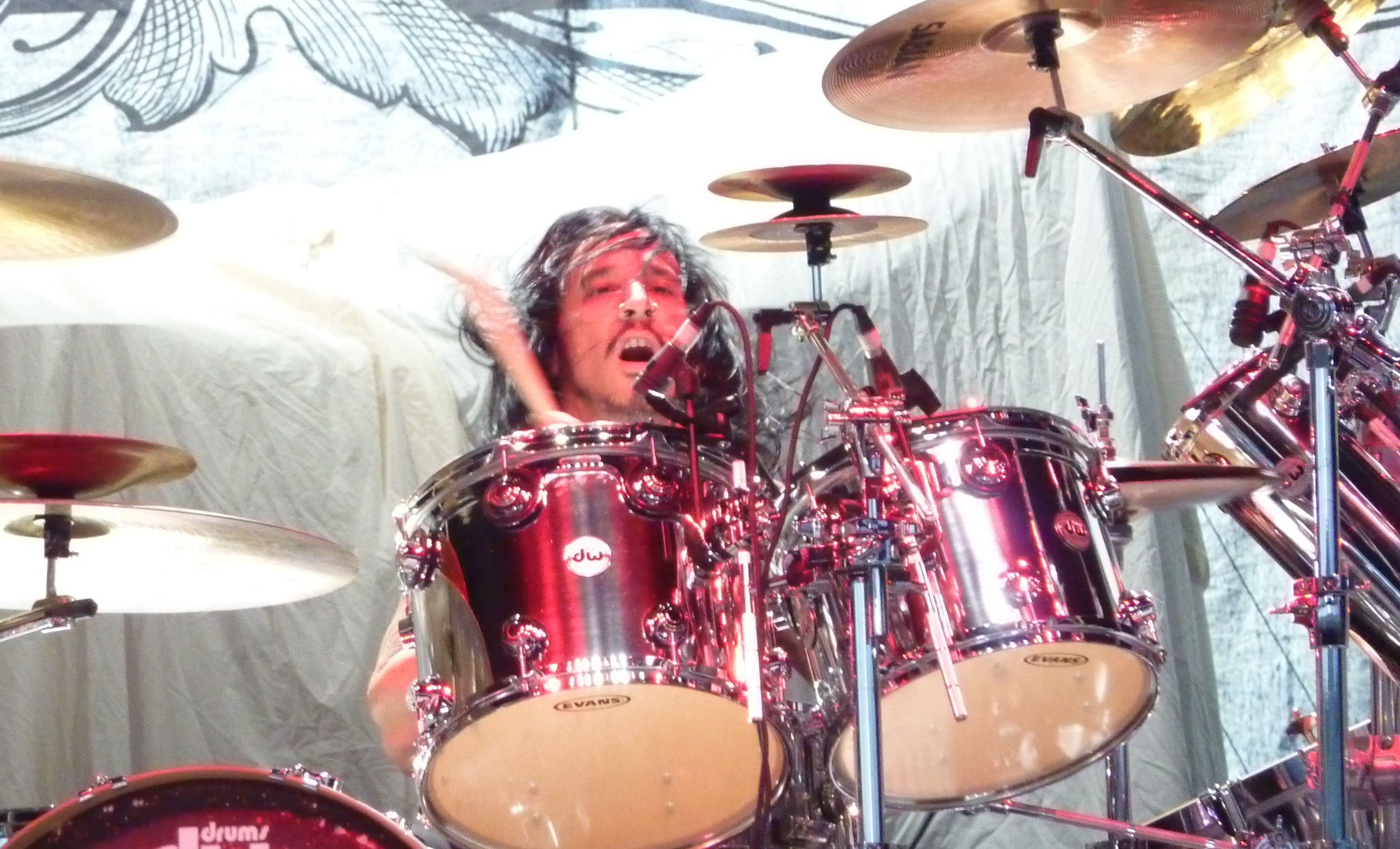
Roy Mayorga replaced original drummer Joel Ekman in 2006.

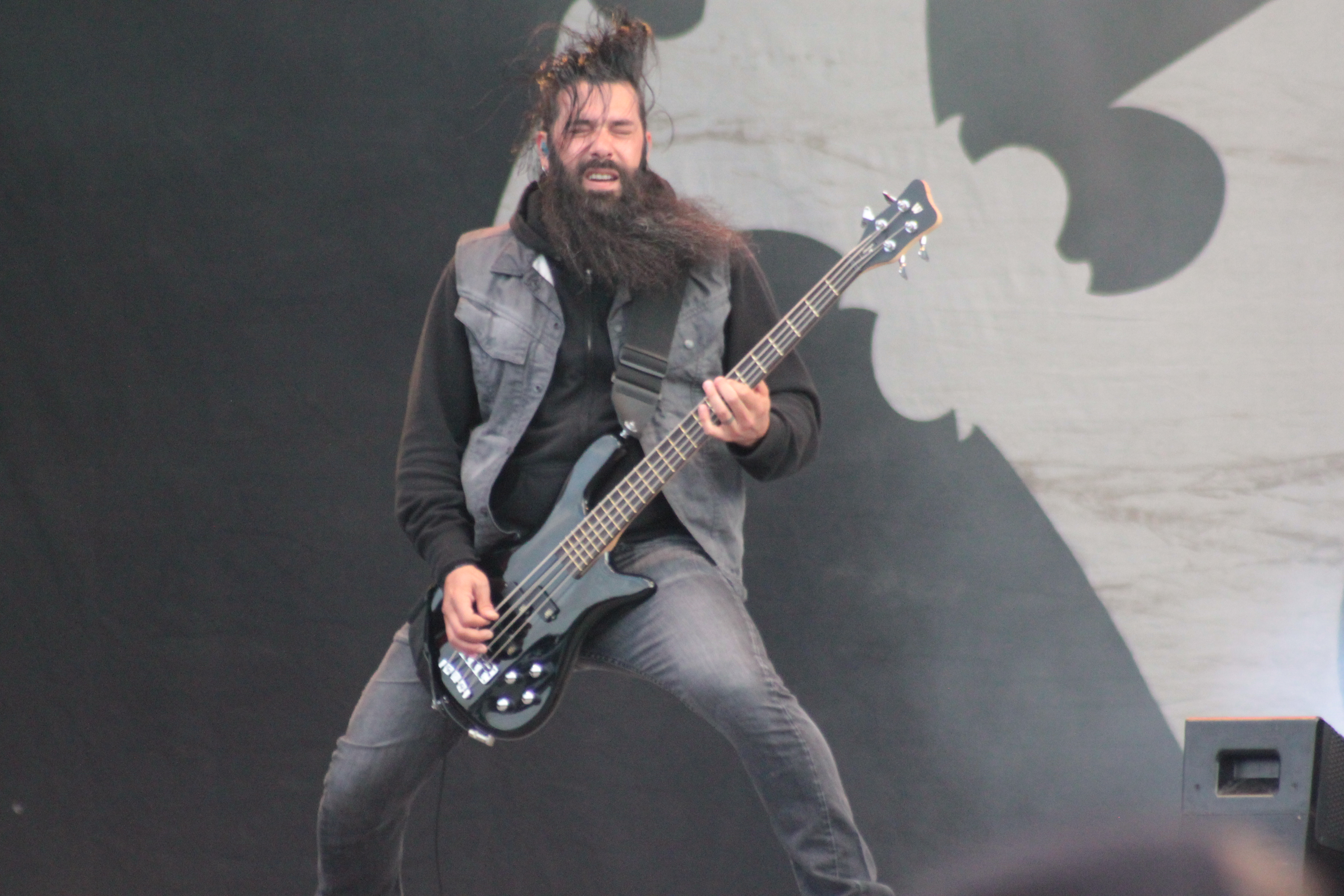
Johny Chow replaced Economaki as Stone Sour bassist in 2012.

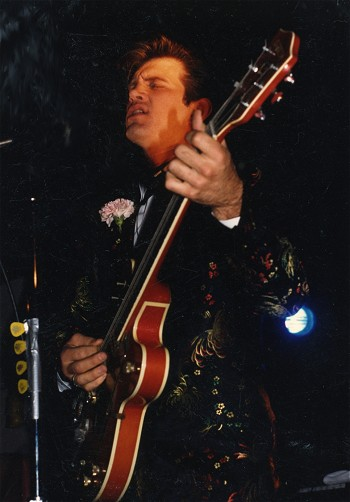
Special editions of 2006's Come What(ever) May featured a recording of Chris Isaak's song "Wicked Game".

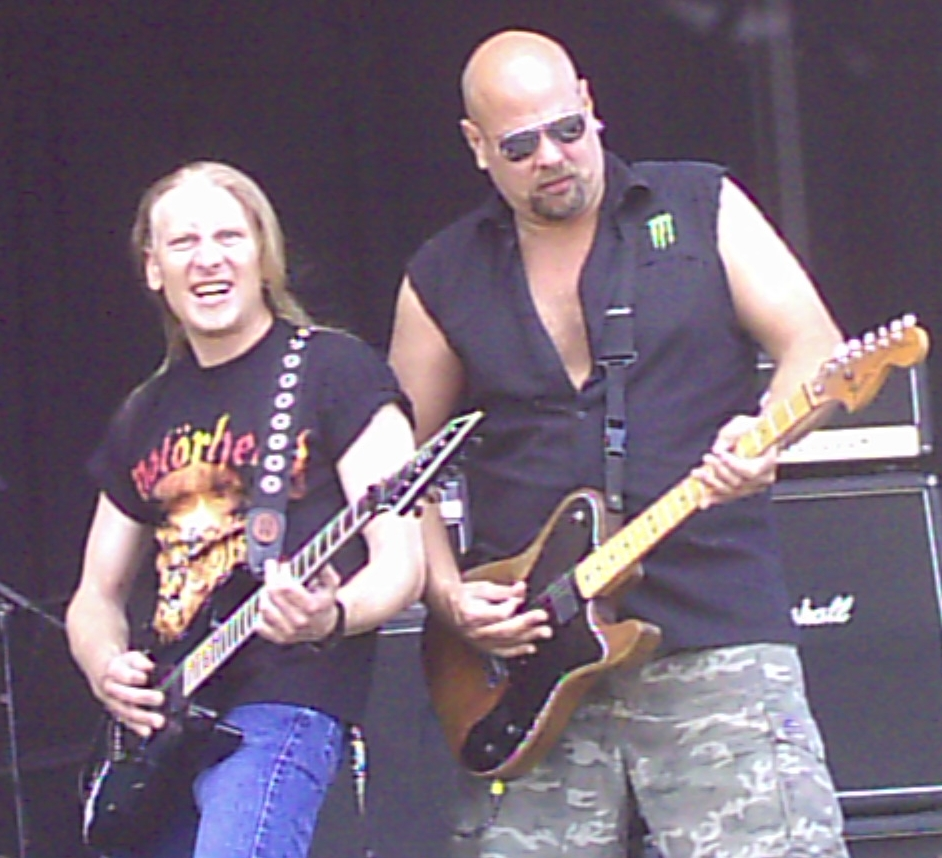
The band covered Metal Church's "The Dark" for the soundtrack to the 2015 film Fear Clinic, which starred Taylor.

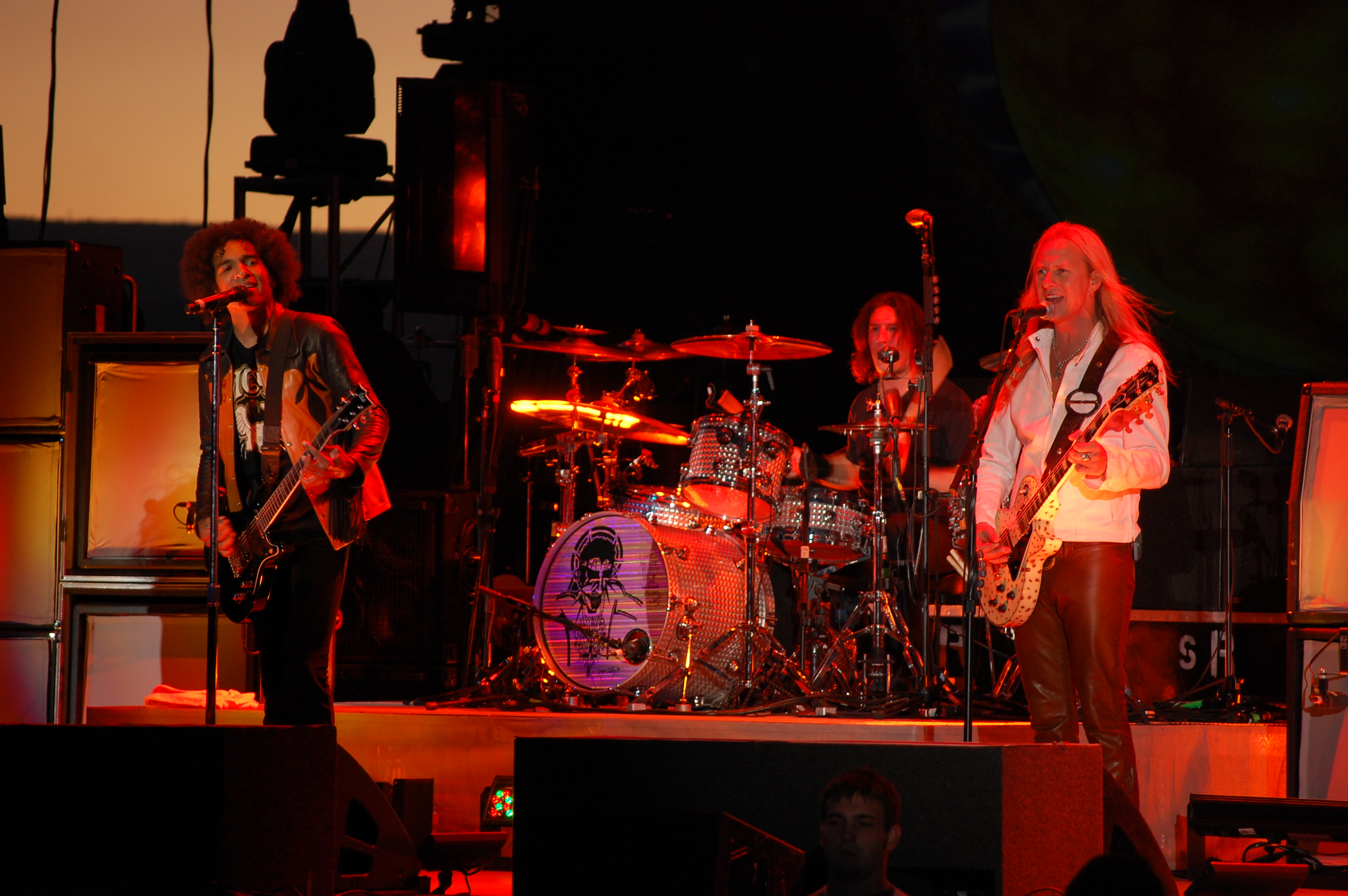
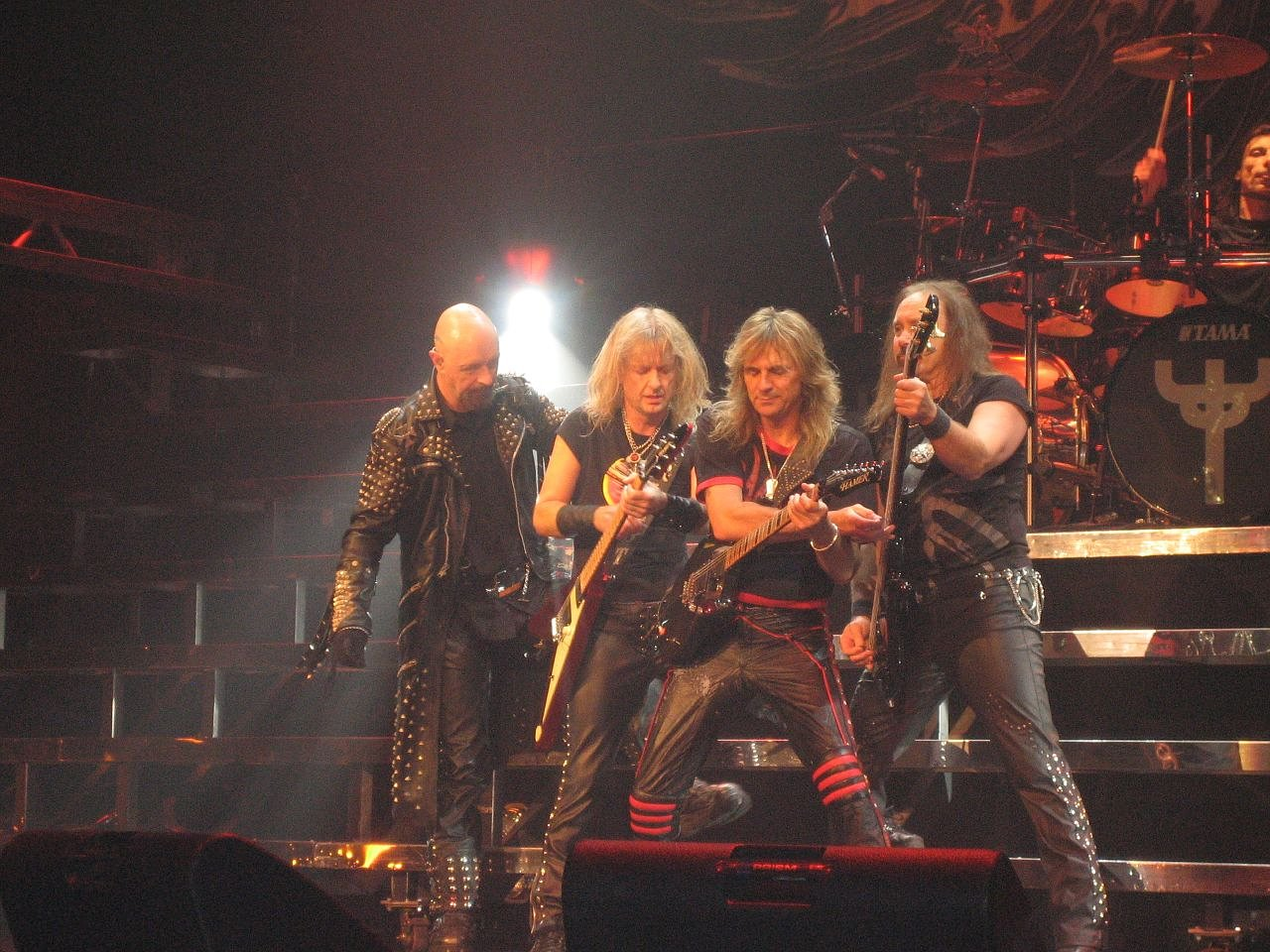
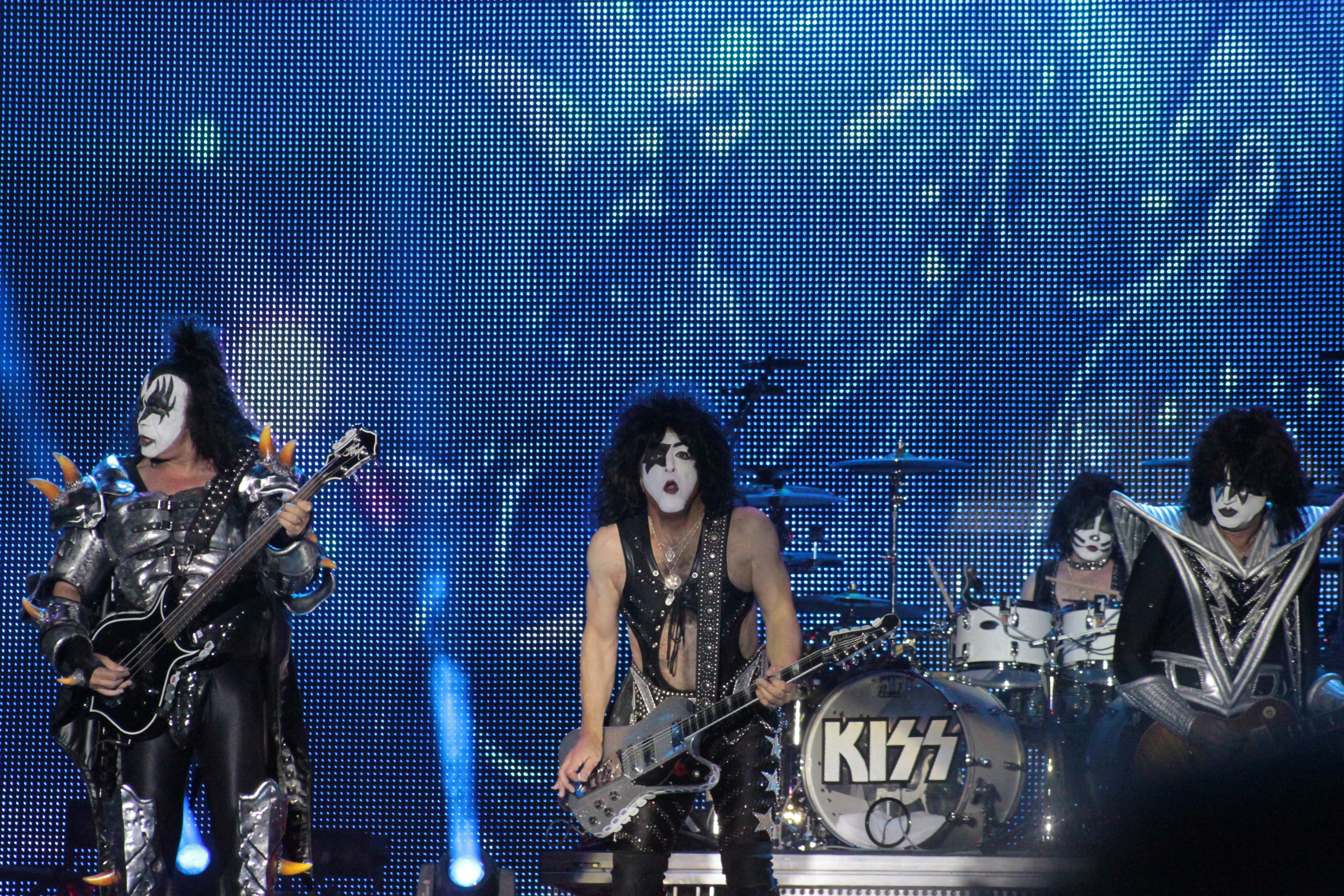
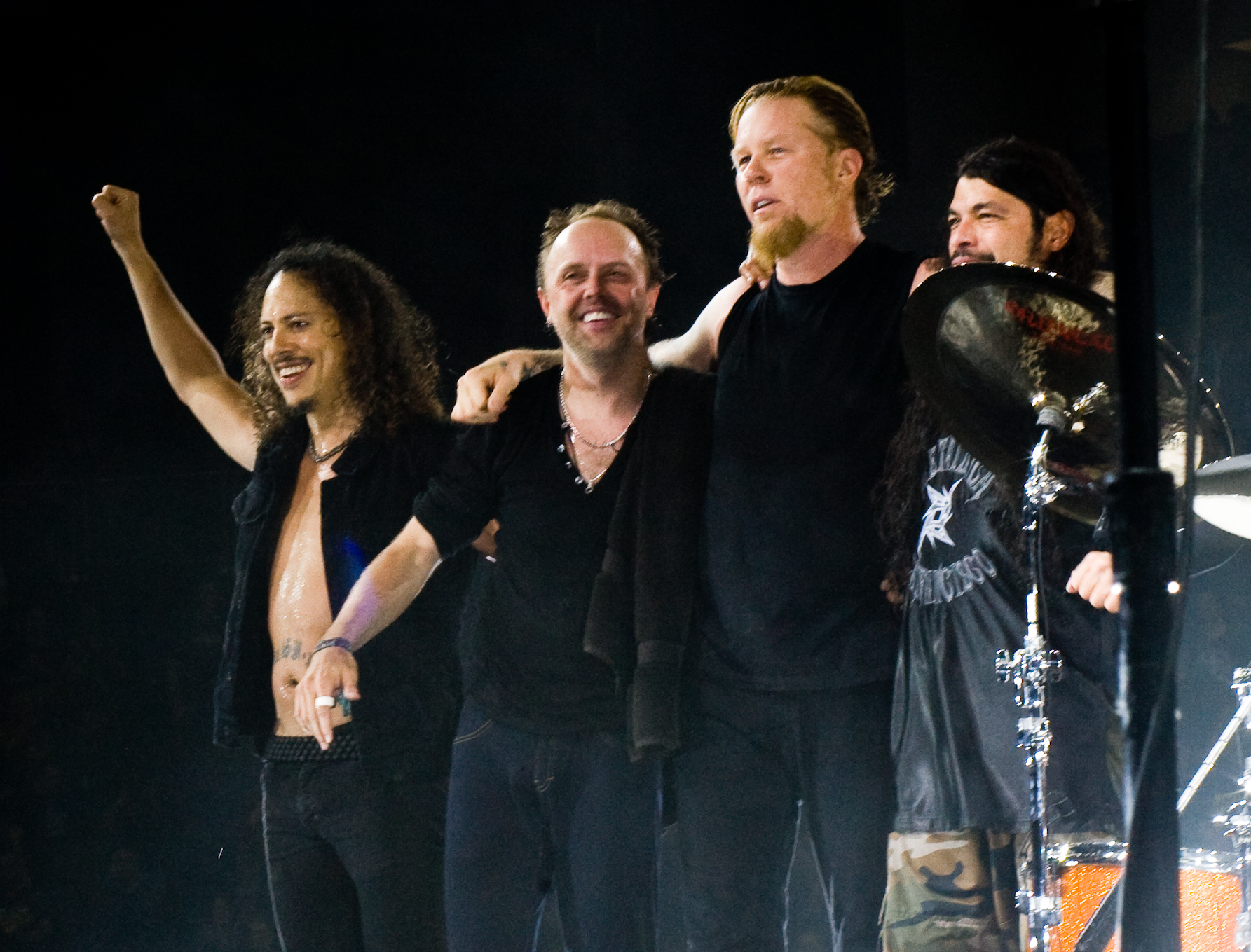
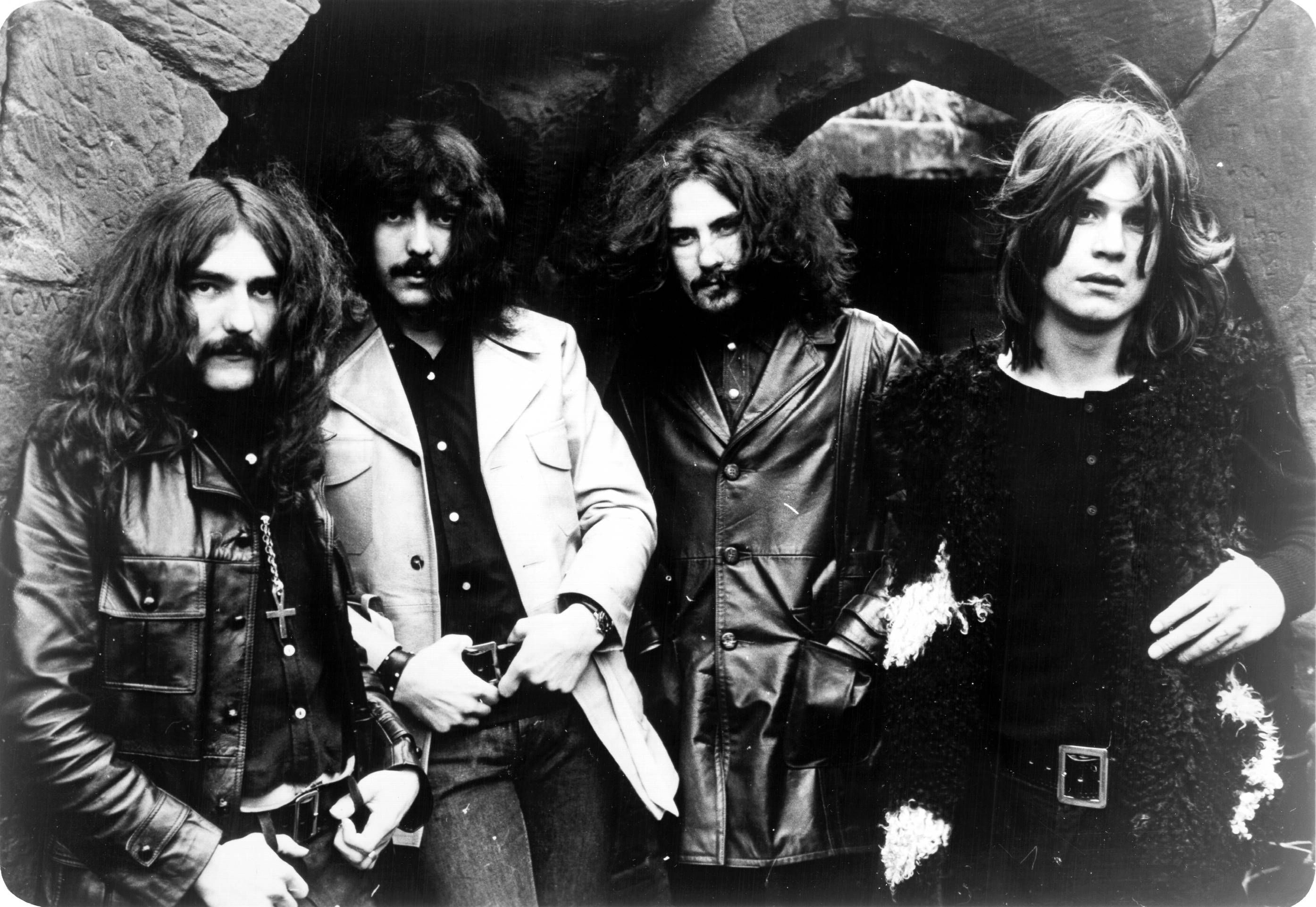
Stone Sour recorded cover versions of songs by Alice in Chains, Judas Priest, Kiss, Metallica and Black Sabbath for 2015's Meanwhile in Burbank... EP.
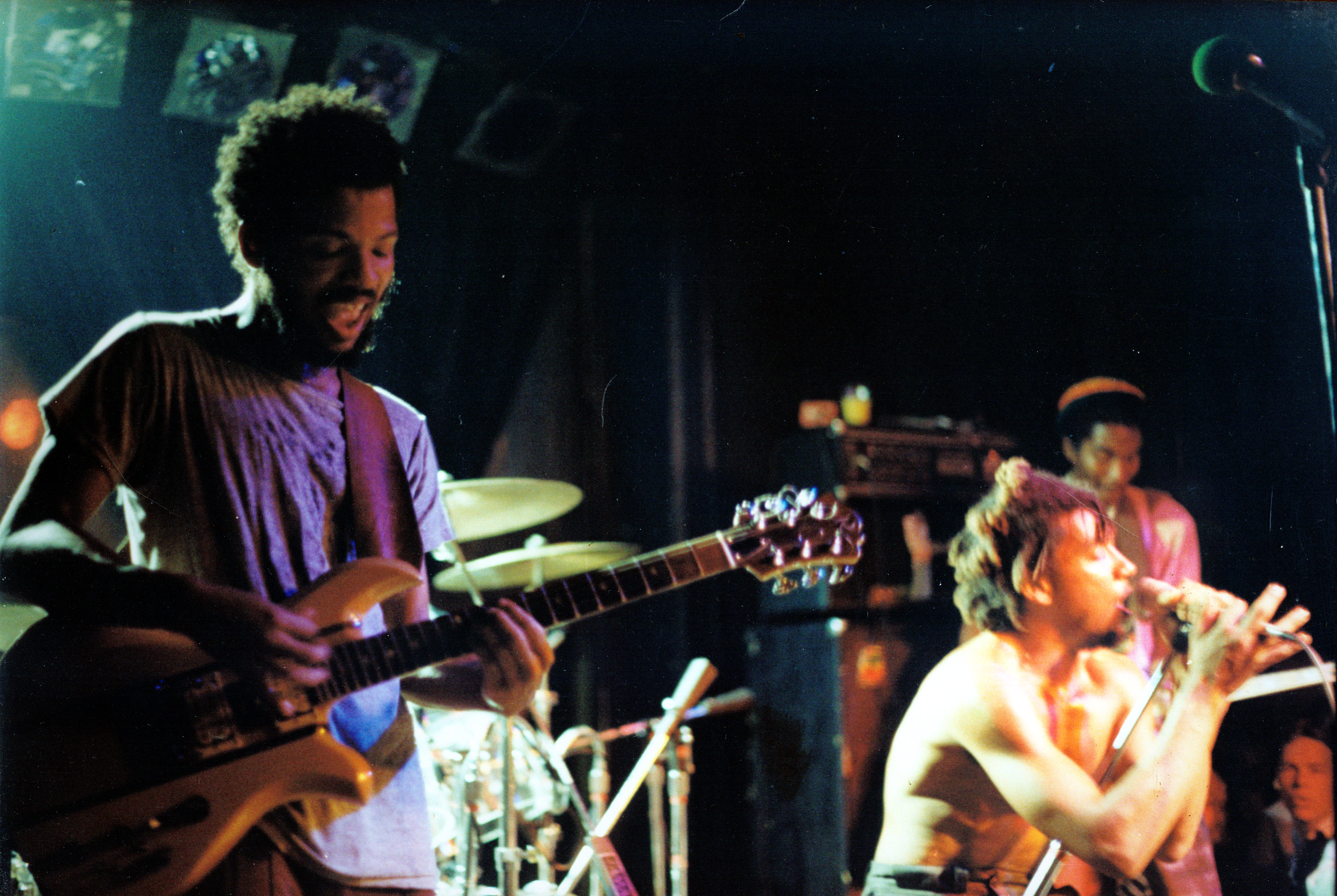
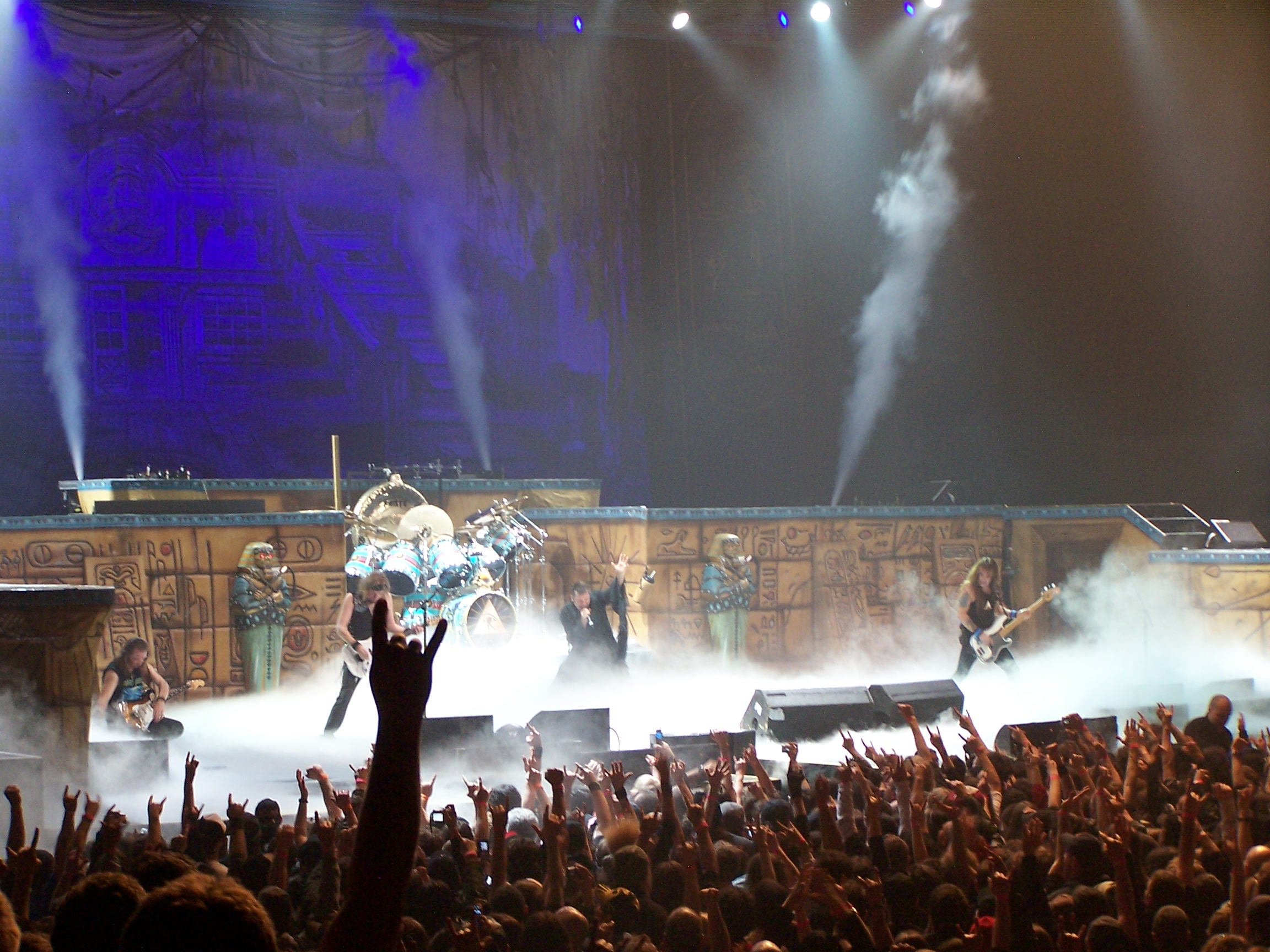
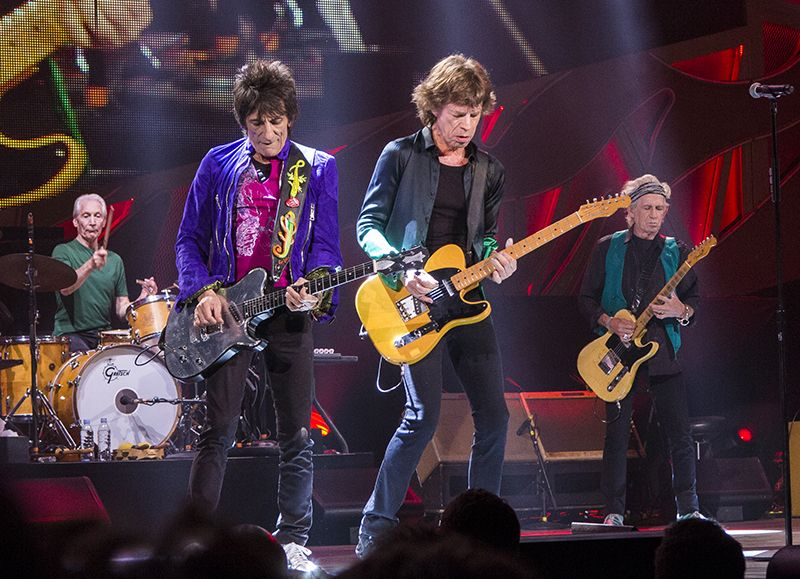
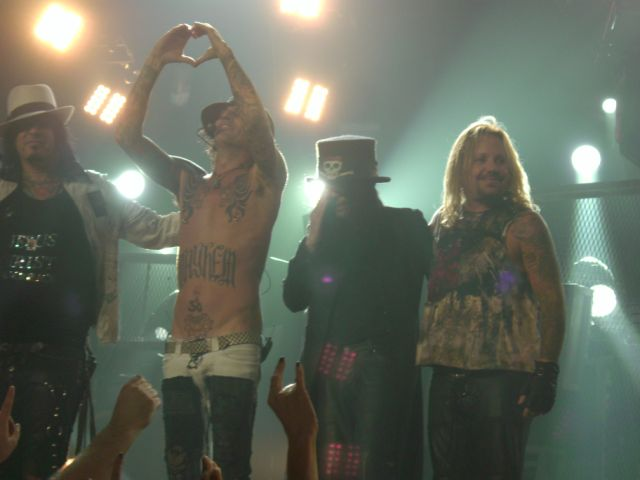
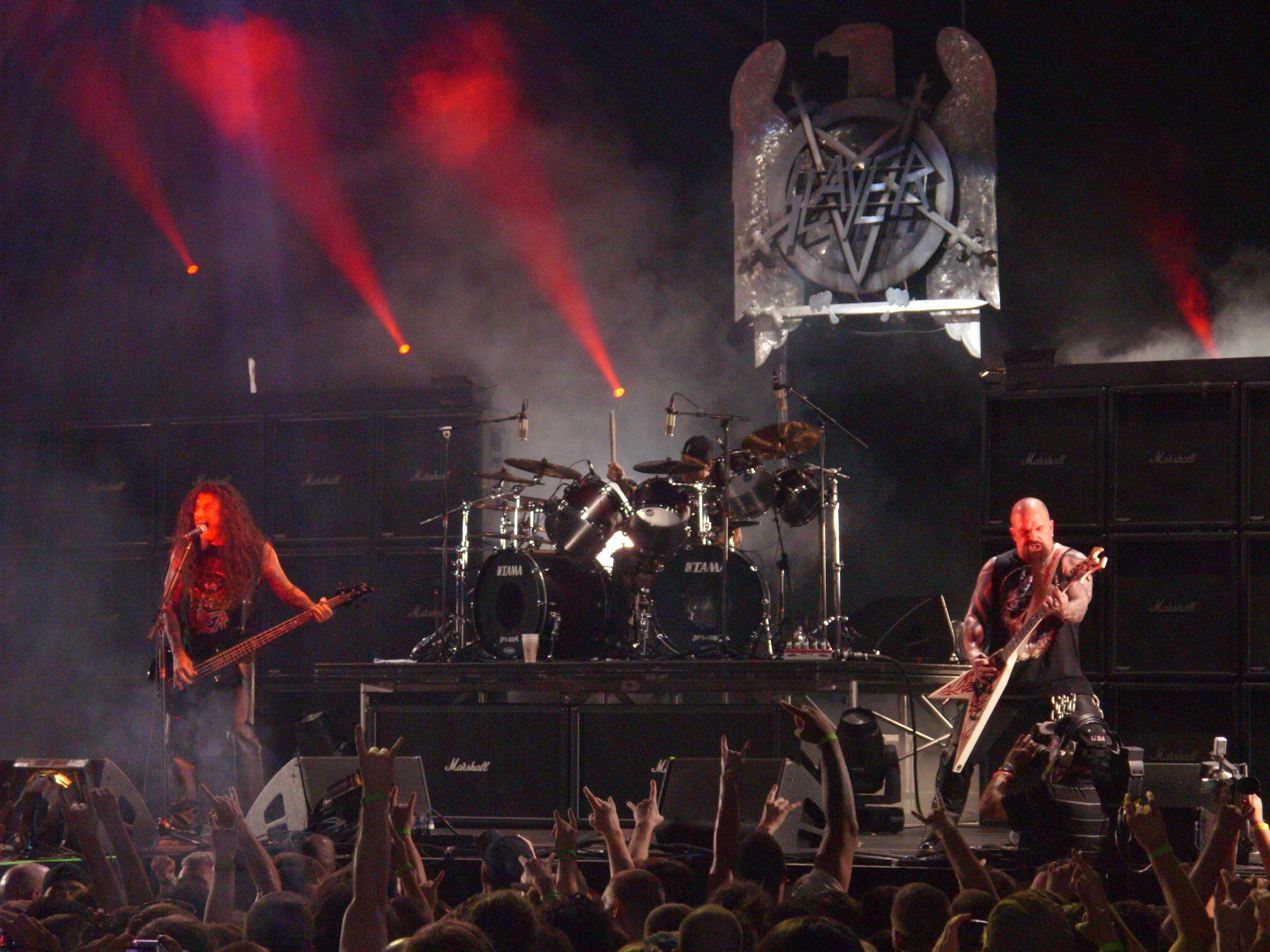
The band's second 2015 EP of covers, Straight Outta Burbank..., features recordings of songs originally by Bad Brains, Iron Maiden, The Rolling Stones, Mötley Crüe and Slayer.

Key
†	Indicates song released as a single
‡	Indicates song written by the whole band

Title	Writer(s)	Release	Year	Ref.	Notes
"1st Person"	Corey Taylor; Jim Root; Josh Rand; Shawn Economaki	Come What(ever) May	2006		
"30/30-150" †	Corey Taylor; Jim Root; Josh Rand; Shawn Economaki	Come What(ever) May	2006		
"82"	Corey Taylor; Jim Root; Josh Rand; Roy Mayorga ‡	House of Gold & Bones Part 2	2013		
"A Rumor of Skin"	Corey Taylor; Jim Root; Josh Rand; Roy Mayorga ‡	House of Gold & Bones Part 1	2012		
"Absolute Zero" †	Corey Taylor; Jim Root; Josh Rand; Roy Mayorga ‡	House of Gold & Bones Part 1	2012		
"Anna"	Corey Taylor; Jim Root; Josh Rand; Shawn Economaki; Roy Mayorga ‡	Audio Secrecy	2010		(Note: "Anna", "Hate Not Gone" and "Home Again" were released as bonus tracks on special editions of Audio Secrecy only.)
"Audio Secrecy"	Corey Taylor; Jim Root; Josh Rand; Shawn Economaki; Roy Mayorga ‡	Audio Secrecy	2010		
"Black John"	Corey Taylor; Jim Root; Josh Rand; Roy Mayorga ‡	House of Gold & Bones Part 2	2013		
"Blotter"	Josh Rand; Shawn Economaki; Joel Ekman	Stone Sour	2002		
"Blue Smoke"	Corey Taylor; Jim Root; Josh Rand; Roy Mayorga ‡	House of Gold & Bones Part 2	2013		
"Blue Study"	Josh Rand; Shawn Economaki; Joel Ekman	Stone Sour	2002		
"Bother" †	Corey Taylor	Stone Sour	2002		
"Cardiff"	Corey Taylor; Jim Root; Josh Rand; Shawn Economaki	Come What(ever) May	2006		
"Children of the Grave"	Tony Iommi; Ozzy Osbourne; Geezer Butler; Bill Ward	Meanwhile in Burbank...	2015		(Note: "Children of the Grave" was originally recorded by Black Sabbath.)
"Choose"	Corey Taylor; Jim Root; Josh Rand; Shawn Economaki; Joel Ekman ‡	Stone Sour	2002		
"Cold Reader"	Josh Rand; Shawn Economaki; Joel Ekman	Stone Sour	2002		
"Come What(ever) May"	Corey Taylor; Jim Root; Josh Rand; Shawn Economaki	Come What(ever) May	2006		
"Creeping Death"	James Hetfield; Lars Ulrich; Cliff Burton; Kirk Hammett	Meanwhile in Burbank...	2015		(Note: "Creeping Death" was originally recorded by Metallica.)
"Digital (Did You Tell)" †	Corey Taylor; Jim Root; Josh Rand; Shawn Economaki; Roy Mayorga ‡	Audio Secrecy	2010		
"Do Me a Favor" †	Corey Taylor; Jim Root; Josh Rand; Roy Mayorga ‡	House of Gold & Bones Part 2	2013		
"Dying"	Corey Taylor; Jim Root; Josh Rand; Shawn Economaki; Roy Mayorga ‡	Audio Secrecy	2010		
"Freeze Dry Seal"	Corey Taylor; Jim Root; Josh Rand; Shawn Economaki	Come What(ever) May	2006		(Note: "Freeze Dry Seal", "Fruitcake", "Suffer", "The Day I Let Go", "The Frozen" and "Wicked Game" were released as bonus tracks on special editions of Come What(ever) May only.)
"Fruitcake"	Corey Taylor; Jim Root; Josh Rand; Shawn Economaki	Come What(ever) May	2006		
"Gallows Humor"	Corey Taylor; Jim Root; Josh Rand; Roy Mayorga ‡	House of Gold & Bones Part 1	2012		(Note: "Gallows Humor" was released as a bonus track on the Japanese edition of House of Gold & Bones Part 1 only.)
"Get Inside" †	Corey Taylor; Josh Rand; Shawn Economaki; Joel Ekman	Stone Sour	2002		
"Gimme Shelter"	Mick Jagger; Keith Richards	Straight Outta Burbank...	2015		(Note: "Gimme Shelter" was originally recorded by The Rolling Stones.)
"Gone Sovereign" †	Corey Taylor; Jim Root; Josh Rand; Roy Mayorga ‡	House of Gold & Bones Part 1	2012		
"Gravesend"	Corey Taylor; Jim Root; Josh Rand; Roy Mayorga ‡	House of Gold & Bones Part 2	2013		
"Hate Not Gone"	Corey Taylor; Jim Root; Josh Rand; Shawn Economaki; Roy Mayorga ‡	Audio Secrecy	2010		
"Heading Out to the Highway"	Rob Halford; Kenneth Downing; Glenn Tipton	Meanwhile in Burbank...	2015		(Note: "Heading Out to the Highway" was originally recorded by Judas Priest.)
"Hell & Consequences"	Corey Taylor; Jim Root; Josh Rand; Shawn Economaki	Come What(ever) May	2006		
"Hesitate" †	Corey Taylor; Jim Root; Josh Rand; Shawn Economaki; Roy Mayorga ‡	Audio Secrecy	2010		
"Home Again"	Corey Taylor; Jim Root; Josh Rand; Shawn Economaki; Roy Mayorga ‡	Audio Secrecy	2010		
"Idle Hands"	Corey Taylor; Jim Root; Josh Rand; Shawn Economaki; Joel Ekman ‡	Stone Sour	2002		
"Imperfect"	Corey Taylor; Jim Root; Josh Rand; Shawn Economaki; Roy Mayorga ‡	Audio Secrecy	2010		
"Influence of a Drowsy God"	Corey Taylor; Jim Root; Josh Rand; Roy Mayorga ‡	House of Gold & Bones Part 1	2012		
"Inhale" †	Josh Rand; Shawn Economaki; Joel Ekman	Stone Sour	2002		
"Inside the Cynic"	Corey Taylor; Jim Root; Josh Rand; Shawn Economaki; Joel Ekman ‡	Stone Sour	2002		(Note: "Inside the Cynic", "Kill Everybody", "Road Hogs", "Rules of Evidence" and "The Wicked" were released as bonus tracks on special editions of Stone Sour only.)
"Kill Everybody"	Corey Taylor; Jim Root; Josh Rand; Shawn Economaki; Joel Ekman ‡	Stone Sour	2002		
"Last of the Real"	Corey Taylor; Jim Root; Josh Rand; Roy Mayorga ‡	House of Gold & Bones Part 1	2012		
"Let's Be Honest"	Corey Taylor; Jim Root; Josh Rand; Shawn Economaki; Roy Mayorga ‡	Audio Secrecy	2010		
"Love Gun"	Paul Stanley	Meanwhile in Burbank...	2015		(Note: "Love Gun" was originally recorded by Kiss.)
"Made of Scars" †	Corey Taylor; Jim Root; Josh Rand; Shawn Economaki	Come What(ever) May	2006		
"Miracles"	Corey Taylor; Jim Root; Josh Rand; Shawn Economaki; Roy Mayorga ‡	Audio Secrecy	2010		
"Mission Statement" †	Corey Taylor; Jim Root; Josh Rand; Shawn Economaki; Roy Mayorga ‡	Audio Secrecy	2010		
"Monolith"	Corey Taylor; Jim Root; Josh Rand; Shawn Economaki; Joel Ekman ‡	Stone Sour	2002		
"My Name Is Allen"	Corey Taylor; Jim Root; Josh Rand; Roy Mayorga ‡	House of Gold & Bones Part 1	2012		
"Nylon 6/6"	Corey Taylor; Jim Root; Josh Rand; Shawn Economaki; Roy Mayorga ‡	Audio Secrecy	2010		
"Omega"	Corey Taylor; Jim Root; Josh Rand; Shawn Economaki; Joel Ekman ‡	Stone Sour	2002		
"Orchids"	Josh Rand; Shawn Economaki; Joel Ekman	Stone Sour	2002		
"Peckinpah"	Corey Taylor; Jim Root; Josh Rand; Roy Mayorga ‡	House of Gold & Bones Part 2	2013		
"Pieces"	Corey Taylor; Jim Root; Josh Rand; Shawn Economaki; Roy Mayorga ‡	Audio Secrecy	2010		
"Reborn"	Corey Taylor; Jim Root; Josh Rand; Shawn Economaki	Come What(ever) May	2006		
"Red City"	Corey Taylor; Jim Root; Josh Rand; Roy Mayorga ‡	House of Gold & Bones Part 2	2013		
"Road Hogs"	Corey Taylor; Jim Root; Josh Rand; Shawn Economaki; Joel Ekman ‡	Stone Sour	2002		
"RU486" †	Corey Taylor; Jim Root; Josh Rand; Roy Mayorga ‡	House of Gold & Bones Part 1	2012		
"Rules of Evidence"	Corey Taylor; Jim Root; Josh Rand; Shawn Economaki; Joel Ekman ‡	Stone Sour	2002		
"Running Free"	Steve Harris; Paul Andrews	Straight Outta Burbank...	2015		(Note: "Running Free" was originally recorded by Iron Maiden.)
"Sadist"	Corey Taylor; Jim Root; Josh Rand; Roy Mayorga ‡	House of Gold & Bones Part 2	2013		
"Sailin' On"	Paul Hudson; Gary Miller; Darryl Jenifer; Earl Hudson	Straight Outta Burbank...	2015		(Note: "Sailin' On" was originally recorded by Bad Brains.)
"Saturday Morning"	Corey Taylor; Jim Root; Josh Rand; Shawn Economaki; Roy Mayorga ‡	Audio Secrecy	2010		(Note: "Saturday Morning" was released as a bonus track on the iTunes edition of Audio Secrecy for customers who pre-ordered the album only.)
"Say You'll Haunt Me" †	Corey Taylor; Jim Root; Josh Rand; Shawn Economaki; Roy Mayorga ‡	Audio Secrecy	2010		
"Seasons in the Abyss"	Tom Araya; Jeff Hanneman	Straight Outta Burbank...	2015		(Note: "Seasons in the Abyss" was originally recorded by Slayer.)
"Shine"	Corey Taylor; Jim Root; Josh Rand; Roy Mayorga ‡	House of Gold & Bones Part 2	2013		(Note: "Shine" was released as a bonus track on the Japanese edition of House of Gold & Bones Part 2 only.)
"Sillyworld" †	Corey Taylor; Jim Root; Josh Rand; Shawn Economaki	Come What(ever) May	2006		
"Socio"	Corey Taylor; Jim Root; Josh Rand; Shawn Economaki	Come What(ever) May	2006		
"Stalemate"	Corey Taylor; Jim Root; Josh Rand; Roy Mayorga ‡	House of Gold & Bones Part 2	2013		
"Suffer"	Corey Taylor; Jim Root; Josh Rand; Shawn Economaki	Come What(ever) May	2006		
"Taciturn"	Corey Taylor; Jim Root; Josh Rand; Roy Mayorga ‡	House of Gold & Bones Part 1	2012		
"Take a Number"	Corey Taylor; Jim Root; Josh Rand; Shawn Economaki; Joel Ekman ‡	Stone Sour	2002		
"The Bitter End"	Corey Taylor; Jim Root; Josh Rand; Shawn Economaki; Roy Mayorga ‡	Audio Secrecy	2010		
"The Conflagration"	Corey Taylor; Jim Root; Josh Rand; Roy Mayorga ‡	House of Gold & Bones Part 2	2013		
"The Dark" †	David Wayne; Kurdt Vanderhoof; Craig Wells	Fear Clinic	2015		(Note: "The Dark" was originally recorded by Metal Church.)
"The Day I Let Go"	Corey Taylor; Jim Root; Josh Rand; Shawn Economaki	Come What(ever) May	2006		
"The Frozen"	Corey Taylor; Jim Root; Josh Rand; Shawn Economaki	Come What(ever) May	2006		
"The House of Gold & Bones"	Corey Taylor; Jim Root; Josh Rand; Roy Mayorga ‡	House of Gold & Bones Part 2	2013		
"The Pessimist"	Corey Taylor; Jim Root; Josh Rand; Shawn Economaki; Roy Mayorga ‡	Transformers: Dark of the Moon	2011		
"The Travelers, Pt. 1"	Corey Taylor; Jim Root; Josh Rand; Roy Mayorga ‡	House of Gold & Bones Part 1	2012		
"The Travelers, Pt. 2"	Corey Taylor; Jim Root; Josh Rand; Roy Mayorga ‡	House of Gold & Bones Part 1	2012		
"The Uncanny Valley"	Corey Taylor; Jim Root; Josh Rand; Roy Mayorga ‡	House of Gold & Bones Part 2	2013		
"The Wicked"	Corey Taylor; Jim Root; Josh Rand; Shawn Economaki; Joel Ekman ‡	Stone Sour	2002		
"Threadbare"	Corey Taylor; Jim Root; Josh Rand; Shawn Economaki; Roy Mayorga ‡	Audio Secrecy	2010		
"Through Glass" †	Corey Taylor; Jim Root; Josh Rand; Shawn Economaki	Come What(ever) May	2006		
"Tired" †	Corey Taylor; Jim Root; Josh Rand; Roy Mayorga ‡	House of Gold & Bones Part 1	2012		
"Too Fast for Love"	Nikki Sixx	Straight Outta Burbank...	2015		(Note: "Too Fast for Love" was originally recorded by Mötley Crüe.)
"Tumult"	Josh Rand; Shawn Economaki; Joel Ekman	Stone Sour	2002		
"Unfinished"	Corey Taylor; Jim Root; Josh Rand; Shawn Economaki; Roy Mayorga ‡	Audio Secrecy	2010		
"We Die Young"	Jerry Cantrell; Layne Staley; Mike Starr; Sean Kinney	Meanwhile in Burbank...	2015		(Note: "We Die Young" was originally recorded by Alice in Chains.)
"Wicked Game"	Chris Isaak	Come What(ever) May	2006		(Note: "Wicked Game" was originally recorded by Chris Isaak.)
"Your God"	Corey Taylor; Jim Root; Josh Rand; Shawn Economaki	Come What(ever) May	2006		
"Zzyzx Rd." †	Corey Taylor; Jim Root; Josh Rand; Shawn Economaki	Come What(ever) May	2006		
