= Zzyzx Rd. (song) =

Single by Stone Sour

from the album Come What(ever) May
- Released: October 5, 2007
- Genre: Alternative rock, soft rock
- Length: 5:14
- Label: Roadrunner
- Songwriter(s): Corey Taylor; Josh Rand; Jim Root; Shawn Economaki; Roy Mayorga
- Producer(s): Nick Raskulinecz

Stone Sour singles chronology
"Made of Scars" (2007)	"Zzyzx Rd." (2007)	"Mission Statement" (2010)

"Zzyzx Rd." is the fifth single from Stone Sour's second album Come What(ever) May. The two-track promo single for the song released strictly to radio in 2007.

== Background ==
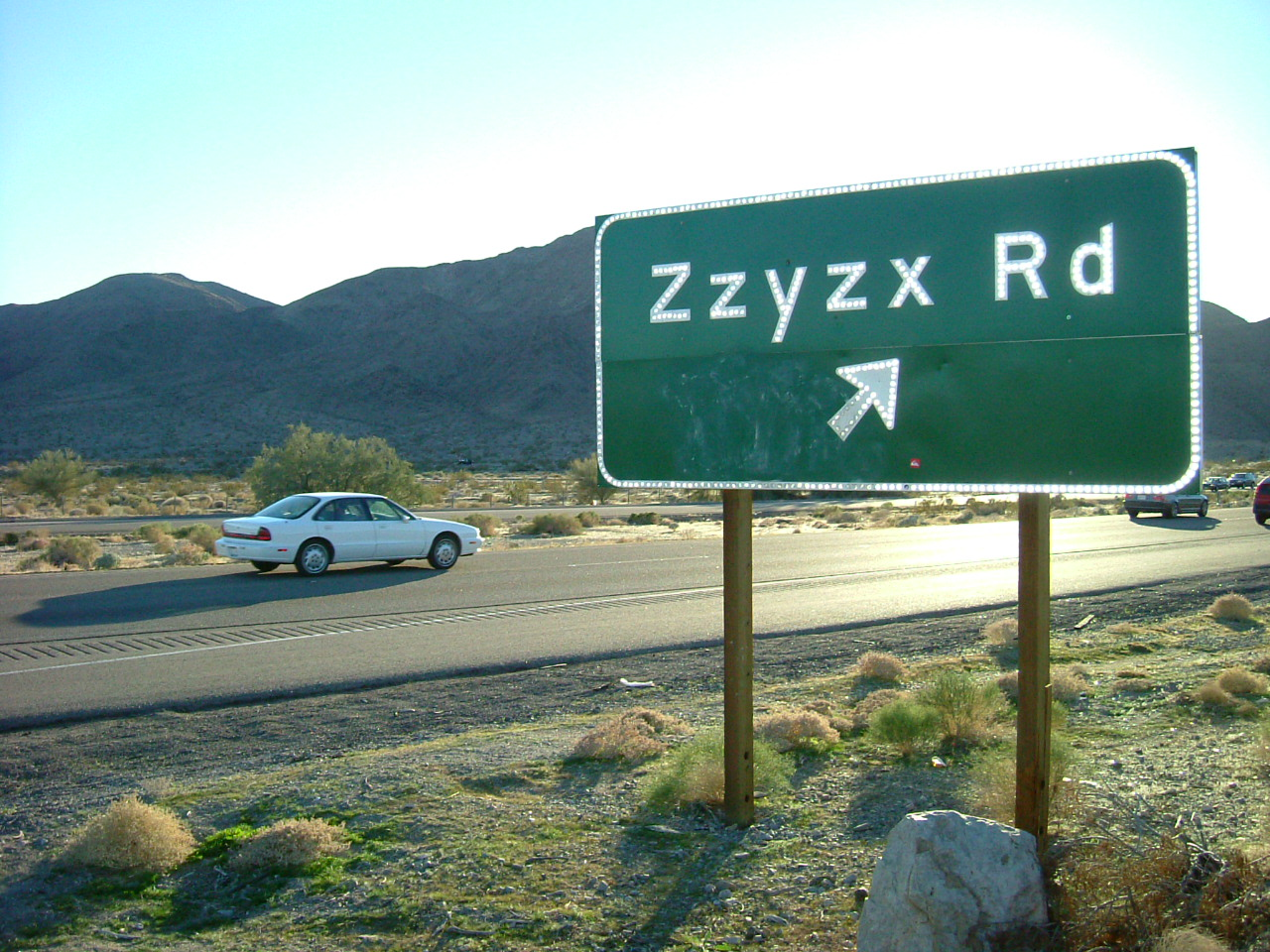
Interstate 15 exit sign for Zzyzx Road

"Zzyzx Rd." is a love song written to Taylor's wife for helping him in his struggles against alcoholism and contemplation of suicide, a theme he returns to across the album. The road referenced in the title is a 4.5-mile-long (7.2 km), part-paved rural collector road in the Mojave Desert, leading from Interstate 15 to Zzyzx, California, approximately 105 miles (169 km) southwest of Las Vegas, Nevada.

Before the album tracklist was finalized, Corey Taylor mentioned the song in an interview with Revolver, saying:

"There's a track we recorded, that I hope makes it on the album, that's basically a love song to my wife, thanking her for dragging me out of the fire and helping me get sober. I've never written anything like that before, but it was very important for me to tell the world not only how much she saved me, but how much she means to me."

== Track listing ==
Promo CD single US and Europe (2007)
No.	Title	Length
1.	"Zzyzx Rd." (pop version)	3:58
2.	"Zzyzx Rd." (original version)	5:13

Promo CD single US No. 2 (2007)
No.	Title	Length
1.	"Zzyzx Rd."	3:58

Cassette single US (2016)
No.	Title	Length
1.	"Zzyzx Rd." (original version)
2.	"Zzyzx Rd." (acoustic)

== Chart positions ==
Chart (2007)	Peak position
US Billboard Hot Mainstream Rock Tracks	29

== Personnel ==
Stone Sour

- Corey Taylor – vocals, acoustic guitar, production
- James Root – lead guitar, production
- Josh Rand – rhythm guitar, production
- Shawn Economaki – bass, production
- Joel Ekman – drums, production

Additional personnel

- Rami Jaffee – piano
