= Live in Moscow (album) =

Live album by Stone Sour
- Released: August 14, 2007
- Recorded: October 18, 2006 in Moscow
- Genre: Hard rock; alternative metal
- Length: 59:00
- Label: Roadrunner
- Producer: Victor Logachev; Stepan Popov

Stone Sour chronology
Come What(ever) May (2006)	Live in Moscow (2007)	Audio Secrecy (2010)

Live in Moscow is a live album by American rock band Stone Sour. The album features a recording of the band performing in Moscow, Russia in October 2006, video footage from this performance is featured on the special edition of their album Come What(ever) May. Live in Moscow was released on August 14, 2007, exclusive to the iTunes Store.

== Track listing ==
No.	Title	Length
1.	"30/30-150"	5:07
2.	"Orchids"	5:27
3.	"Take a Number"	4:41
4.	"Reborn"	3:48
5.	"Your God"	5:14
6.	"Inhale"	4:05
7.	"Come What(ever) May"	5:46
8.	"Bother"	6:32
9.	"Through Glass"	5:45
10.	"Blotter"	3:58
11.	"Hell & Consequences"	4:27
12.	"Get Inside"	4:10
Total length:		59:00

== Personnel ==
Stone Sour

- Corey Taylor − vocals, guitars
- James Root − lead guitar
- Josh Rand − rhythm guitar
- Shawn Economaki − bass
- Roy Mayorga − drums, percussion

Technical personnel

- Victor Logachev − concert producer
- Stepan Popov − concert producer
- Dave "Shirt" Nichols − concert audio mixer
- Nina Bell − negotiations
- Roman Geigert − camera
- Dmitri Shevelev − camera
- Anna Gogichaishvili − camera
- Alexei "Siid" Tsarev − camera, editing
- Dmitri Grekulov − camera
- Dima "Brain" Zvjagin − camera
- Kiril Chapligin − coordination
- Artem Butsenko − recording and sound post-production, editing
- Dmitri Makhov − chief production
