= Made of Scars =

Single by Stone Sour

from the album Come What(ever) May
- Released: June 11, 2007
- Genre: Alternative metal
- Length: 3:23 (album version); 3:09 (radio edit)
- Label: Roadrunner
- Songwriters: Shawn Economaki; Josh Rand; Jim Root; Corey Taylor
- Producer: Nick Raskulinecz

Stone Sour singles chronology
"Sillyworld" (2007)	"Made of Scars" (2007)	"Zzyzx Rd." (2007)

"Made of Scars" is the fourth single from Stone Sour's second album Come What(ever) May and the band's seventh single overall. The music video shows the band performing the song live at the Electric Factory in Philadelphia. The song reached number twelve on the US mainstream rock chart. The music video was shot at the Jägermeister Music Tour.

== Track listing ==
Promo CD single US and Europe
No.	Title	Length
1.	"Made of Scars" (edit)	3:09
2.	"Made of Scars"	3:23

== Charts ==
=== Weekly charts ===
Weekly chart performance for "Made of Scars"
Chart (2007)	Peak position
US Mainstream Rock (Billboard)	12

=== Year-end charts ===
Year-end chart performance for "Made of Scars"
Chart (2007)	Position
US Mainstream Rock Songs (Billboard)	40
