= Sillyworld =

Single by Stone Sour

from the album Come What(ever) May
- Released: March 9, 2007
- Recorded: January – April 2006 at Studio 606 In Northridge, California
- Genre: Alternative metal; post-grunge
- Length: 4:08
- Label: Roadrunner
- Songwriters: Shawn Economaki; Josh Rand; Jim Root; Corey Taylor
- Producer: Nick Raskulinecz

Stone Sour singles chronology
"Through Glass" (2006)	"Sillyworld" (2007)	"Made of Scars" (2007)

"Sillyworld" (stylized in all lowercase) is the third single from Stone Sour's 2006 album Come What(ever) May. It reached number two on the Mainstream Rock charts in 2007. A video for the song, directed by David Brucha, was released in February 2007, combining images of corporate America with pictures of clenched fists of resistance, revolutionists such as Mao Zedong, Ayatollah Khomeini, Che Guevara, and AK-47 assault rifles. According to the Roadrunner Records website: "The video for Stone Sour's 'Silly World' takes a crack at all the bullshit going on in the world today...apathy, tyranny, poverty, violence, and greed are all targets."

The lyrics are a critique of how ideas are becoming nothing but symbols through media corruption, and then dying off as they lose their significance. It speaks of instances such as love becoming "Just a song," or peace being "Just two fingers now... just a phase." Similar to "Through Glass", the content of the song is angry and has rebellious undertone, despite its softer, slower instrumental style.

The song was first time performed live on the 10 January 2007 at Scotiabank Place in Ottawa, Canada.

== Track listing ==
CD single
No.	Title	Length
1.	"Sillyworld" (edit)	3:48
2.	"Sillyworld"	4:08
3.	"The Frozen"	3:04

Promo CD single US (2006)
No.	Title	Length
1.	"Sillyworld" (edit)	3:45
2.	"Sillyworld" (album version)	4:08

Promo CD single US #2 (2006)
No.	Title	Length
1.	"Sillyworld" (clean radio edit)	3:45

Promo CD single Europe (2007)
No.	Title	Length
1.	"Sillyworld" (clean edit)	3:33
2.	"Sillyworld" (edit)	3:33

== Charts ==
=== Weekly charts ===
Weekly chart performance for "Sillyworld"
Chart (2007)	Peak position
US Alternative Airplay (Billboard)	21
US Mainstream Rock (Billboard)	2

=== Year-end charts ===
Year-end chart performance for "Sillyworld"
Chart (2007)	Position
US Mainstream Rock Songs (Billboard)	12
