= 30/30-150 =

Single by Stone Sour

from the album Come What(ever) May
- Released: June 3, 2006
- Genre: Alternative metal
- Length: 4:18
- Label: Roadrunner
- Songwriters: Shawn Economaki; Josh Rand; Jim Root; Corey Taylor
- Producer: Nick Raskulinecz

Stone Sour singles chronology
"Inhale" (2003)	"30/30-150" (2006)	"Through Glass" (2006)

"30/30-150" is the first single by American rock band Stone Sour's second album Come What(ever) May. The song received a nomination for Best Metal Performance at the 49th annual Grammy Awards, but lost to "Eyes of the Insane" by Slayer.

== Music video ==
The video shows the band members individually in high-contrast black and white superimposed over a timer counting down from "3030.150" and occasionally large close-ups of Corey Taylor's mouth. The numbers seen in the background appear to count down the time remaining in the clip in tenths of a second, beginning at 3030.150. The single cover is an edited shot from the music video.

Though current Stone Sour drummer Roy Mayorga is shown on the drumset in the "30/30-150" music video, he did not actually record the drum tracks for the song, this was done by former Godsmack drummer Shannon Larkin.

== Title meaning ==
The title comes from Taylor's jeans size (30/30) and weight (150 lbs) during his highschool years – which this entire song is a throwback to. The reason the song is titled after the physical characteristics he had during that time is because he felt that there were many that disbelieved in his ability to amount to anything (particularly at that time), and as suggested by the lyrics, he is now proving them wrong.

== Track listing ==
CD single
No.	Title	Length
1.	"30/30-150"	4:18
2.	"30/30-150" (live)	5:07
3.	"Reborn"	3:19

Promo CD single UK
No.	Title	Length
1.	"30/30-150"	4:18
