= Come What(ever) May =

Studio album by Stone Sour
- Released: August 1, 2006
- Recorded: January 22 – April 7, 2006
- Studios: Studio 606 Northridge, Los Angeles, California
- Genres: Post-grunge; alternative rock; heavy metal; hard rock
- Length: 48:54
- Label: Roadrunner
- Producer: Nick Raskulinecz

Stone Sour chronology
| Stone Sour (2002) | Come What(ever) May (2006) | Live in Moscow (2007) |

Alternative cover
- Special edition album cover

Singles from Come What(ever) May
- 1. "30/30-150" Released: June 3, 2006; 2. "Through Glass" Released: July 22, 2006; 3. "Sillyworld" Released: March 9, 2007; 4. "Made of Scars" Released: June 11, 2007; 5. "Zzyzx Rd." Released: October 5, 2007

Come What(ever) May is the second studio album by American rock band Stone Sour, released on August 1, 2006, by Roadrunner Records. It was recorded and produced by Nick Raskulinecz and the band at Studio 606 in Los Angeles, California.

Writing for the album began as early as 2003 when vocalist Corey Taylor and guitarist James Root were writing material for their other band, Slipknot. In January 2006, Stone Sour began recording their second album, during which time drummer Joel Ekman left the band because of family constraints. He was eventually replaced by ex-Soulfly drummer Roy Mayorga who played on all but two tracks on the album.

Following the release of the album, Stone Sour promoted it for over a year, releasing five singles and touring in the United States, Canada, Japan and several countries in Europe. The album received generally positive reviews. It was praised for showing a progression in the band's songwriting ability and musical style. It was also certified Platinum in the United States and the single "30/30-150" was nominated for Best Metal Performance at the 49th Grammy Awards. On June 26, 2007, Stone Sour released a special edition version of the album; it included six previously unreleased tracks and a bonus DVD with three music videos and a complete live performance by the band in Moscow. It remains their best-selling album to date, mostly due to the success of the single "Through Glass". The album became their first to be certified Platinum by the RIAA which occurred on July 21, 2017.

== Production ==
In September 2005, lead singer Corey Taylor announced that Stone Sour would return with a second album. He said that they had written over 30 songs, some during the writing process of Vol. 3: (The Subliminal Verses), the third album by vocalist Taylor and guitarist James Root's other band Slipknot, and that they were working on demoing the tracks before entering the studio. Dave Fortman was originally scheduled to produce the album, but on January 22, 2006, Stone Sour began working on the album with producer Nick Raskulinecz at Dave Grohl's personal studio (Studio 606), in Los Angeles. Time in the studio began with a week of pre-production, during which the guitarist Josh Rand said that Raskulinecz "pushed [the band] to the brink and back" to help fine-tune the songs they had previously written. first album, writing for Come What(ever) May was by all members.

Following this, the band set out to record 18 tracks and work began on recording Joel Ekman's drum tracks. However, Ekman was forced to leave the studio after four weeks because of his young son's diagnosis of a brainstem glioma. With the fate of the album in jeopardy, Stone Sour recruited Mayorga, ex-Soulfly, as a session drummer. Mayorga recorded drums for all but two tracks on the album, Godsmack drummer Shannon Larkin performed on the track "30/30-150" and guitarist Root performed drums on the bonus track "The Day I Let Go". In an interview with Revolver during the recording process, the vocalist Taylor talked about the differences between this album and their previous album, Stone Sour. He said that pressures from fans and record labels were much larger, also noting that he "thrives on the pressure, because it gets [him] going". While promising, "The album's gonna be miles above the first one," Taylor explained that it is "more melodic and darker". In late March 2006, drummer Joel Ekman officially left Stone Sour and the band was talking with a few drummers who could replace him. On April 7, 2006, the recording sessions for Come What(ever) May concluded. A month later, Mayorga joined Stone Sour full-time .

== Promotion ==
In March 2006, it was announced that "Come What May," would be released on July 18, 2006. However, the release date for the album was pushed back until August 22. Because of the delay, Stone Sour released a music video for the track "Reborn", which had footage of the band working on the album in the studio. The album's cover artwork was released online on May 20, 2006. Shortly after, it was confirmed by a representative from the band's record label, Roadrunner, that the release date had been brought forward, and the official release date would be August 1, 2006. On July 31, 2006, the day before its release the album was made available online for streaming in its entirety through AOL.

On May 22, 2006, the first single from the album, "30/30-150", was made available online as a free MP3 download. A music video for the single was shot with director P.R. Brown in Los Angeles and received a premier on MTV's Headbangers Ball on June 3, 2006. Prior to the release of the second single from the album, "Through Glass", radio stations throughout the US showed high support for the song. A music video for the single was shot with director Tony Petrossian and was released online on June 9, 2006, through Yahoo!. The third single from the album, "Sillyworld", began receiving radio airplay in November 2006. A music video for the single was shot in January 2007 and was released online on March 8, 2007. The fourth single from the album, "Made of Scars", had a music video which was recorded live on April 7, 2007, and was posted online on June 5, 2007. The fifth and final single from the album, "Zzyzx Rd.", started receiving radio airplay in fall 2007; no music video was made for the single.

The band began touring in support of the album before its release, starting with several free shows in the US, followed by appearances at festivals in Europe. They then joined Korn for their 2006 edition of Family Values Tour across the US, with 33 dates across 3 months. On August 8, 2006, Stone Sour made a special guest appearance on The Tonight Show with Jay Leno to promote and perform the second single, "Through Glass." They also performed at the Japanese Summer Sonic Festival midway through the Family Values Tour. In November and December 2006, Stone Sour joined Disturbed for their Music as a Weapon Tour. In January 2007, Stone Sour joined Evanescence for a Canadian tour, followed by a headlining tour of Europe. They then headlined the spring 2007 Jägermeister Music Tour across the US, followed by headlining tours in Australia and Japan. They then started a tour in Europe playing at festivals and selected headline shows. They finished touring in support of the album with a headlining tour in the US in August and September in 2007.

=== Special edition ===
On June 26, 2007, Stone Sour released a special edition version of the album with six previously unreleased tracks and a bonus DVD. The DVD included a full concert performance by the band from October 2006 in Moscow and the music videos for "30/30-150", "Through Glass", and "Sillyworld". When talking about the special edition, vocalist Taylor said, "We really wanted to do something which was really cool," saying that it shows the band's different musical elements and them in their live element, which he says "people really gravitate towards". In addition to this, Stone Sour released a live album of their concert in Moscow exclusively on iTunes, entitled Live in Moscow.

== Musical style ==
In an interview with MTV in 2006, vocalist Taylor said that Come What(ever) May was a return to the roots of the band, stating it is "a lot more from the spirit of what the band started with in 1992". He noted that some songs were "very atmospheric" while others maintained "the hard rock and the heavy stuff". Jon Wiederhorn of MTV said that "for every thrash riff there's a tunefully grungy passage, for every flailing guitar line there's a rock-radio hook." When talking about the track "30/30-150", he said parts are "bludgeoning, barbed and heavy" while others are "soaring and triumphant" with the production of Raskulinecz helping to balance the album's heaviness with its radio-accessibility. Come What(ever) May's lyrics include themes of "pain, pleasure, happiness, and grief". The diversity in subjects is evident throughout the album; songs including "Come What(ever) May" were politically influenced while the track "Socio" is about "social anxiety attacks" that Taylor suffered. "Zzyzx Rd" is a love song written to Taylor's wife for helping him in his struggles against alcoholism and contemplation of suicide. "I've never written anything like that before, but it was very important for me to tell the world not only how much she saved me, but how much she means to me," said Taylor. Taylor said there is a common thread with the lyrics throughout the album, saying that they are "about never forgetting where you came from, who you are and why you do this."

== Reception ==
Professional ratings
Review scores
| Source | Rating |
|---|---|
| 411mania.com | 8.0/10 |
| About.com | 3.5/5 stars |
| Allmusic | 3.5/5 stars |
| Blender | 3/5 stars |
| Blabbermouth.net | 7.5/10 |
| IGN | 4.8/10 |
| MusicOMH | 3/5 stars |
| Melodic | 3.5/5 stars |

Come What(ever) May was met with generally positive critical reviews. Several reviewers noted how it helped to further establish Stone Sour. Chad Bower of About.com stated that the band had "progressed a lot since their debut", noting that the album was "very diverse and [allows] the band to show many different sides of their musical personality". Megan Frye of Allmusic opened her review of the album by distinguishing what sets Stone Sour apart musically, writing "[it's their] ability to create smooth, radio-friendly alternative metal songs while simultaneously not boring the people who have heard way too much from post-grunge groups." On a similar note, Michael Melchor of 411mania said, "The band is much better at the craft of songwriting than many of their peers." In contrast, reviewer William Fry of IGN criticized the album, writing, "Stone Sour doesn't do anything inspired, original, or fresh here," even calling the album "completely misdirected, and stonewalled". A particular point of interest for reviewers was how Come What(ever) May is more melodic than the band's previous album Stone Sour. Melchor of 411mania said the album is "much more liberal with the balladry and acoustic sounds than its predecessor"; of the track "Sillyworld" he said, "It sounds like what Nickelback could be if Chad Kroeger could write a good melody." In his review, Chad Bower labeled Come What(ever) May as a "very melodic and accessible album" writing that "it has a little something for everyone". Similarly, Megan Frye praised the album as an "unyielding effort from a promising talent".

Come What(ever) May sold over 80,000 copies in its first week and entered the Billboard 200 chart in the United States at #4, and went on to be certified platinum in the United States, Canada and New Zealand, and gold in the United Kingdom and Australia. In 2007, the single "30/30-150" was nominated for Best Metal Performance at the 49th Grammy Awards.

== Track listing ==
All lyrics are written by Corey Taylor; all music composed by Josh Rand, James Root, Shawn Economaki and Taylor (credited to Stone Sour), except where noted.

| No. | Title | Length |
|---|---|---|
| 1. | "30/30-150" | 4:18 |
| 2. | "Come What(ever) May" | 3:39 |
| 3. | "Hell & Consequences" | 3:31 |
| 4. | "Sillyworld" | 4:08 |
| 5. | "Made of Scars" | 3:23 |
| 6. | "Reborn" | 3:11 |
| 7. | "Your God" | 4:44 |
| 8. | "Through Glass" | 4:42 |
| 9. | "Socio" | 3:20 |
| 10. | "1st Person" | 4:01 |
| 11. | "Cardiff" | 4:42 |
| 12. | "Zzyzx Rd." | 5:15 |
| Total length: | | 48:54 |

Japanese bonus tracks
| No. | Title | Length |
|---|---|---|
| 13. | "Suffer" | 3:42 |
| Total length: | | 52:36 |

Special edition bonus tracks
| No. | Title | Writer(s) | Length |
|---|---|---|---|
| 12. | "Zzyzx Rd." (Pop version) | | 4:01 |
| 13. | "Suffer" | | 3:42 |
| 14. | "Fruitcake" | | 4:00 |
| 15. | "The Day I Let Go" | | 5:05 |
| 16. | "Freeze Dry Seal" | | 2:43 |
| 17. | "Wicked Game" (Chris Isaak cover) | Chris Isaak | 4:24 |
| 18. | "The Frozen" | | 3:04 |
| Total length: | | | 70:49 |

=== Special edition DVD ===
Live in Moscow (October 18, 2006)
| No. | Title | Writer(s) | Length |
|---|---|---|---|
| 1. | "30/30-150" | | 4:43 |
| 2. | "Orchids" | Taylor, Rand, Root, Economaki, Joel Ekman | 5:45 |
| 3. | "Take a Number" | Taylor, Rand, Root, Economaki, Ekman | 4:26 |
| 4. | "Reborn" | | 4:36 |
| 5. | "Your God" | | 4:21 |
| 6. | "Inhale" | Taylor, Rand, Root, Economaki, Ekman | 4:06 |
| 7. | "Come What(ever) May" | | 6:36 |
| 8. | "Bother" | Taylor | 5:17 |
| 9. | "Through Glass" | | 5:46 |
| 10. | "Blotter" | Taylor, Rand, Root, Economaki, Ekman | 4:10 |
| 11. | "Hell & Consequences" | | 4:12 |
| 12. | "Get Inside" | Taylor, Rand, Root, Economaki, Ekman | 4:12 |
| 13. | "Credits" | | 0:35 |

Music videos
| No. | Title | Length |
|---|---|---|
| 1. | "Reborn" (Hidden video) |
| 2. | "30/30-150" | 4:26 |
| 3. | "Through Glass" | 4:18 |
| 4. | "Sillyworld" | 3:57 |
| 5. | "Made of Scars" (US special edition) | 3:46 |

=== Ten Year Anniversary Edition ===
LP 1 Side A
| No. | Title | Length |
|---|---|---|
| 1. | "30/30-150" |
| 2. | "Come What(ever) May" |
| 3. | "Hell & Consequences" |
| 4. | "Sillyworld" |
| 5. | "Made of Scars" |
| 6. | "Reborn" |

LP 1 Side B
| No. | Title | Length |
|---|---|---|
| 1. | "Your God" |
| 2. | "Through Glass" |
| 3. | "Socio" |
| 4. | "1st Person" |
| 5. | "Cardiff" |
| 6. | "Zzyzx Rd." (Pop version) |

LP 2 Side A
| No. | Title | Writer(s) | Length |
|---|---|---|---|
| 1. | "Though Glass" (Live Acoustic) |
| 2. | "Wicked Game" (Live Acoustic, Chris Isaak cover) | Chris Isaak |
| 3. | "Wild Horses" (Live Acoustic, Rolling Stones cover) | Jagger–Richards |
| 4. | "Cardiff" (Acoustic) |
| 5. | "Zzyzx Rd." (Acoustic) |

LP 2 Side B
| No. | Title | Length |
|---|---|---|
| 1. | "Suffer" |
| 2. | "Fruitcake" |
| 3. | "Freeze Dry Seal" |
| 4. | "The Day I Let Go" |
| 5. | "The Frozen" |

== Personnel ==
Stone Sour

- Corey Taylor − vocals, guitar on track 17, additional guitar on tracks 4, 8 and 12
- James Root − guitar (on all tracks except 18), drums on track 15
- Josh Rand − guitar (on all tracks except 18)
- Shawn Economaki − bass (on all tracks except 17 and 18)
- Roy Mayorga − drums (on all tracks except 1, 15, 17 and 18)

Additional personnel

- Shannon Larkin − drums on tracks 1, 15
- Rami Jaffee – piano on track 12

Technical personnel

- Nick Raskulinecz − production, engineering
- Mike Terry − engineering
- Paul Fig − engineering
- John Lousteau − engineering
- Dave "Shirt" Nicholls − engineering on track 17
- John Nicholson − drum technician
- Martin Connors − guitar technician on track 17
- Randy Staub − mixing
- Rob Stefanson − assistant mixing
- Ted Jensen − mastering
- Hugh Syme − art direction, design, illustration
- Chapman Baehler − photography

Bonus DVD credits

- Victor Logachev − concert producer
- Stepan Popov − concert producer
- Dave "Shirt" Nichols − concert audio mixer
- Nina Bell − negotiations
- Roman Geigert − camera
- Dmitri Shevelev − camera
- Anna Gogichaishvili − camera
- Alexei "Siid" Tsarev − camera, editing
- Dmitri Grekulov − camera
- Dima "Brain" Zvjagin − camera
- Kiril Chapligin − coordination
- Artem Butsenko − recording and sound post-production, editing
- Dmitri Makhov − chief production

== Charts ==
=== Weekly charts ===
Weekly chart performance for Come What(ever) May
| Chart (2006) | Peak position |
|---|---|
| Australian Albums (ARIA) | 21 |
| Austrian Albums (Ö3 Austria) | 13 |
| Belgian Albums (Ultratop Flanders) | 34 |
| Belgian Albums (Ultratop Wallonia) | 82 |
| Canadian Albums (Billboard) | 6 |
| Dutch Albums (Album Top 100) | 33 |
| Finnish Albums (Suomen virallinen lista) | 21 |
| French Albums (SNEP) | 56 |
| German Albums (Offizielle Top 100) | 18 |
| Irish Albums (IRMA) | 33 |
| Italian Albums (FIMI) | 48 |
| Japanese Albums (Oricon) | 44 |
| New Zealand Albums (RMNZ) | 31 |
| Scottish Albums (Official Charts) | 28 |
| Swedish Albums (Sverigetopplistan) | 30 |
| Swiss Albums (Schweizer Hitparade) | 25 |
| UK Albums (Official Charts) | 27 |
| US Billboard 200 | 4 |
| US Top Rock Albums (Billboard) | 1 |
| US Indie Store Album Sales (Billboard) | 3 |

=== Year-end charts ===
Year-end chart performance for Come What(ever) May
| Chart (2006) | Position |
|---|---|
| US Billboard 200 | 189 |

== Certifications ==
Certifications for Come What(ever) May
| Region | Certification | Certified units/sales |
|---|---|---|
| Australia (ARIA) | Gold | 35,000^{‡} |
| Canada (Music Canada) | Platinum | 100,000^{‡} |
| New Zealand (RMNZ) | Platinum | 15,000^{‡} |
| United Kingdom (BPI) | Gold | 100,000^{^} |
| United States (RIAA) | Platinum | 1,000,000^{‡} |
^{^} Shipments figures based on certification alone.^{‡} Sales+streaming figures based on certification alone.
