= Stone Sour =

American rock band

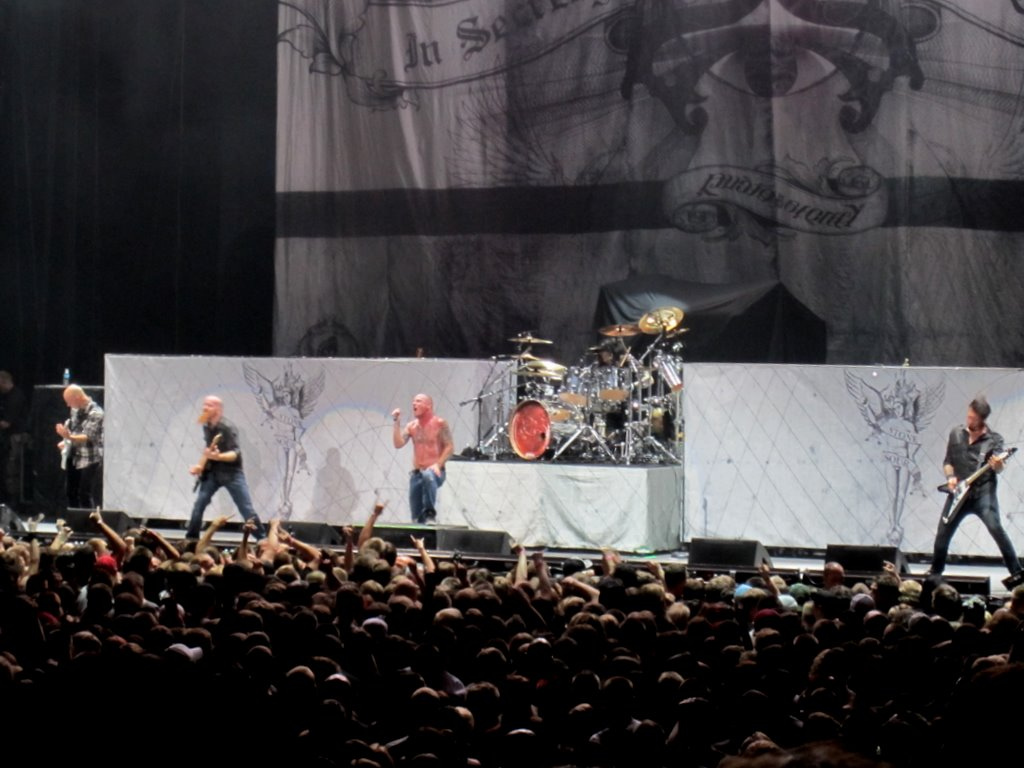
- Stone Sour performing at Target Center in August 2010

Background information
- Also known as: Project-X (2000); Super Ego (2001–2002); Closure (2002)
- Origin: Des Moines, Iowa, U.S.
- Genres: Alternative metal; hard rock; post-grunge; alternative rock
- Works: Stone Sour discography
- Years active: 1992–1997; 2000–2020 (indefinite hiatus); 2026–present
- Label: Roadrunner
- Past members: Corey Taylor; Josh Rand; Roy Mayorga; Johny Chow; Christian Martucci; Jim Root; Shawn Economaki; Joel Ekman
- Website: stonesour.com

Stone Sour is an American rock band formed in Des Moines, Iowa, in 1992. The band performed for five years before disbanding in 1997. They reunited in 2000; since 2015, the group has consisted of lead vocalist Corey Taylor, rhythm guitarist Josh Rand, drummer Roy Mayorga, bassist Johny Chow and lead guitarist Christian Martucci. Longtime members Joel Ekman (drums, percussion) and Shawn Economaki (bass) left the band in 2006 and 2011, respectively. Former lead guitarist Jim Root left in 2014. The band has been on an indefinite hiatus since 2020.

To date, Stone Sour has released six studio albums: Stone Sour (2002); Come What(ever) May (2006); Audio Secrecy (2010); House of Gold & Bones – Part 1 (2012); House of Gold & Bones – Part 2 (2013) and Hydrograd (2017). They also released a digital live album, Live in Moscow, in 2007. Their album Hydrograd was released in June 2017 and is their first album to feature guitarist Christian Martucci and bassist Johny Chow.

Stone Sour earned the group two Grammy Award nominations, both for Best Metal Performance, for the singles "Get Inside", in 2003, and "Inhale", in 2004. For their album Come What(ever) May, the group received another Grammy Award nomination for Best Metal Performance for the single "30/30-150", in 2007. The band has sold 2.1 million albums in the United States as of April 2017.

== History ==
=== Formation and early years (1992–1997) ===
Stone Sour was founded by Corey Taylor, who later became the vocalist of Slipknot, and former drummer Joel Ekman. The band's name comes from a cocktail menu at a local bar. Taylor's longtime friend Shawn Economaki joined shortly after, and filled in as the bass player. During this time, Stone Sour recorded two demo tapes, in 1993 and 1994. In 1995, Jim Root, who is now part of Slipknot with Taylor, joined the band. In 1996, this lineup recorded another demo tape, songs from which would be used in 2002 on their self-titled debut album. In 1997, the band went on hiatus, during which Taylor and Root spent most of their time with Slipknot, who were another up-and-coming act in Des Moines and would soon earn a record deal.

=== Stone Sour and hiatus (2000–2004) ===
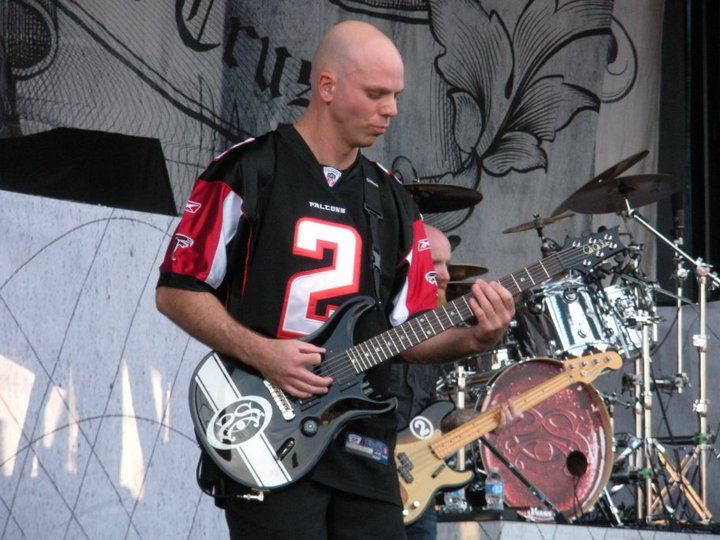
Josh Rand joined the band in 2001.

After Josh Rand joined the band, the band recorded their debut self-titled album in Cedar Falls. Upon release, the album charted at number 46 on the Billboard 200. The song "Bother", which was featured on the Spider-Man soundtrack (credited only to Taylor), peaked at number 2 on the Mainstream Rock Chart as well as number 4 on the Modern Rock Tracks and 56 on the Billboard Hot 100. The next single, "Inhale", peaked at 18 on the Mainstream Rock chart. The group received two Grammy Award nominations for Best Metal Performance for the singles "Get Inside" and "Inhale" in 2003 and 2004 respectively. The album went on to achieve Gold certification. The band toured for six months with label mates Sinch and Chevelle before going on a temporary hiatus as Taylor and Root went back to join Slipknot for another album and tour.

=== Come What(ever) May (2005–2007) ===
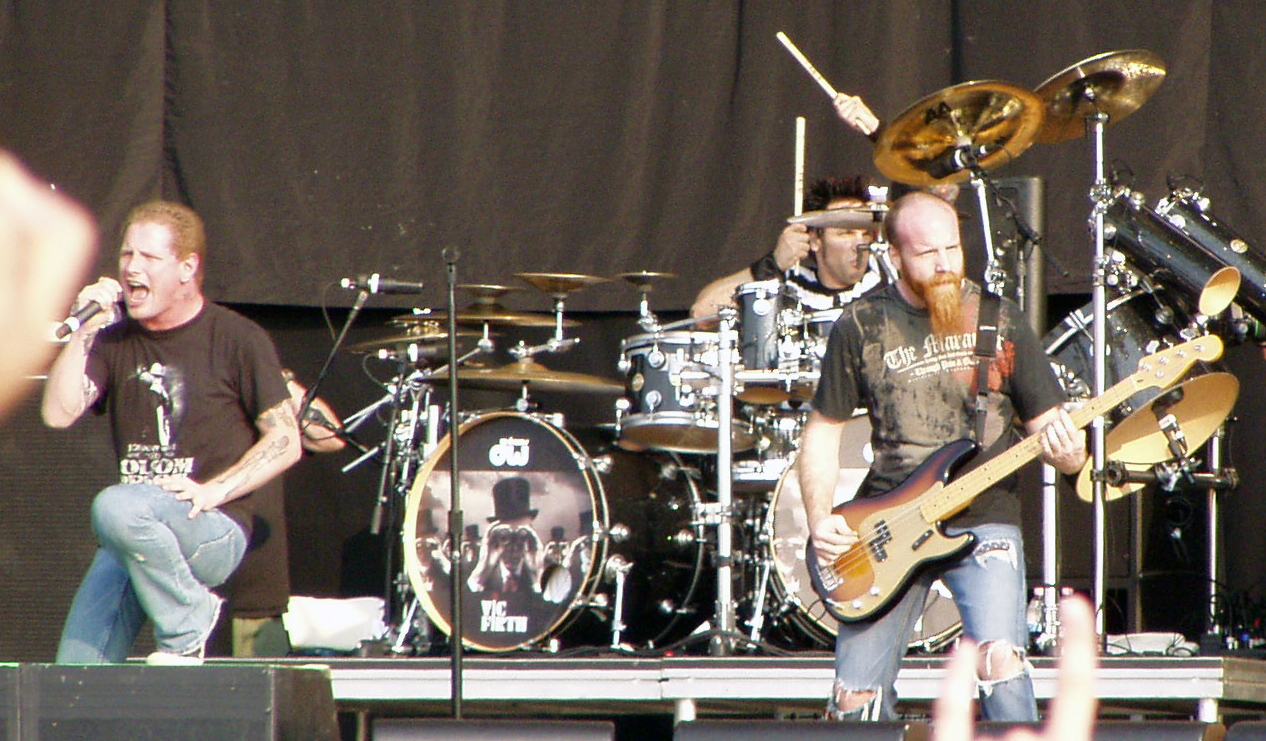
Stone Sour performing in 2007. From left to right: Corey Taylor, Roy Mayorga and Shawn Economaki.

The band came back in 2006 to release their second studio album, Come What(ever) May. They parted ways with drummer Joel Ekman, currently drumming for Isaac James, who left to take care of his cancer-stricken son, and later recruited current drummer, Roy Mayorga (Soulfly, and later Amebix and Hellyeah). The track "30/30-150" was recorded with Godsmack drummer Shannon Larkin. The album was released on August 1, 2006. It was met with positive reviews from critics, and sold 80,000 copies in the first week, allowing it to debut at number four on the Billboard 200. The band toured for the next year and a half, releasing the Live in Moscow album exclusively to iTunes on August 14, 2007.

The single "Sillyworld" peaked at number 2 on the Mainstream Rock charts in 2006. "Through Glass" proved to be successful peaking at number 1 on the Mainstream Rock Chart, 2 on the Modern Rock Tracks, 12 on the Adult Top 40 and 39 on the Billboard Hot 100 also in 2006. They released two more singles in 2007, "Made of Scars" and "Zzyzx Rd.", which managed to peak at numbers 21 and 29 on the Mainstream Rock charts respectively. In 2006 they received a Grammy Award for Best Metal Performance nomination for the single "30/30-150".

=== Audio Secrecy (2009–2011) ===
The band's third album Audio Secrecy, was recorded at the Blackbird Studios in Nashville, Tennessee with producer Nick Raskulinecz, who was the producer for the band's second album Come What(ever) May. and released on September 7, 2010.

Stone Sour played the first annual Rockstar Energy Drink Uproar Festival with Avenged Sevenfold and Hollywood Undead among others. Stone Sour set the release date of Audio Secrecy as September 7. Stone Sour were part of the Soundwave Festival in late February/early March in Australia 2011. Stone Sour headlined The Avalanche Tour in 2011, supported by Theory of a Deadman, Skillet, Halestorm and Art of Dying. It was also announced that a Stone Sour live DVD will be released, filmed at the Brighton Centre in the United Kingdom. The band toured with Avenged Sevenfold, New Medicine and Hollywood Undead on the "Nightmare After Christmas Tour" 2011.

On April 16, 2011, it was announced that bassist Shawn Economaki had left the tour for personal reasons. Jason Christopher, who had played with Corey Taylor previously during his solo performances and with the Junk Beer Kidnap Band, filled in for the tour. In May 2011, Stone Sour canceled the remaining dates from their headline tour as drummer Roy Mayorga suffered a minor stroke. He made a full recovery. The band played their last show of 2011 at the second day of the Rock in Rio IV festival, which took place in Rio de Janeiro, Brazil, between September 23 – October 2. Drummer Roy Mayorga was not present at the show as he was expecting his first child back home, and filling-in for him was Dream Theater and The Winery Dogs drummer Mike Portnoy.

=== House of Gold & Bones (2012–2013) ===
The band released a song called "The Pessimist" as a free download on their Facebook page on March 27, 2012. The song was previously only available on the iTunes deluxe version of the soundtrack to Transformers: Dark of the Moon. They also released their first DVD Live at Brighton in the same year, capturing their performance on November 7, 2010.

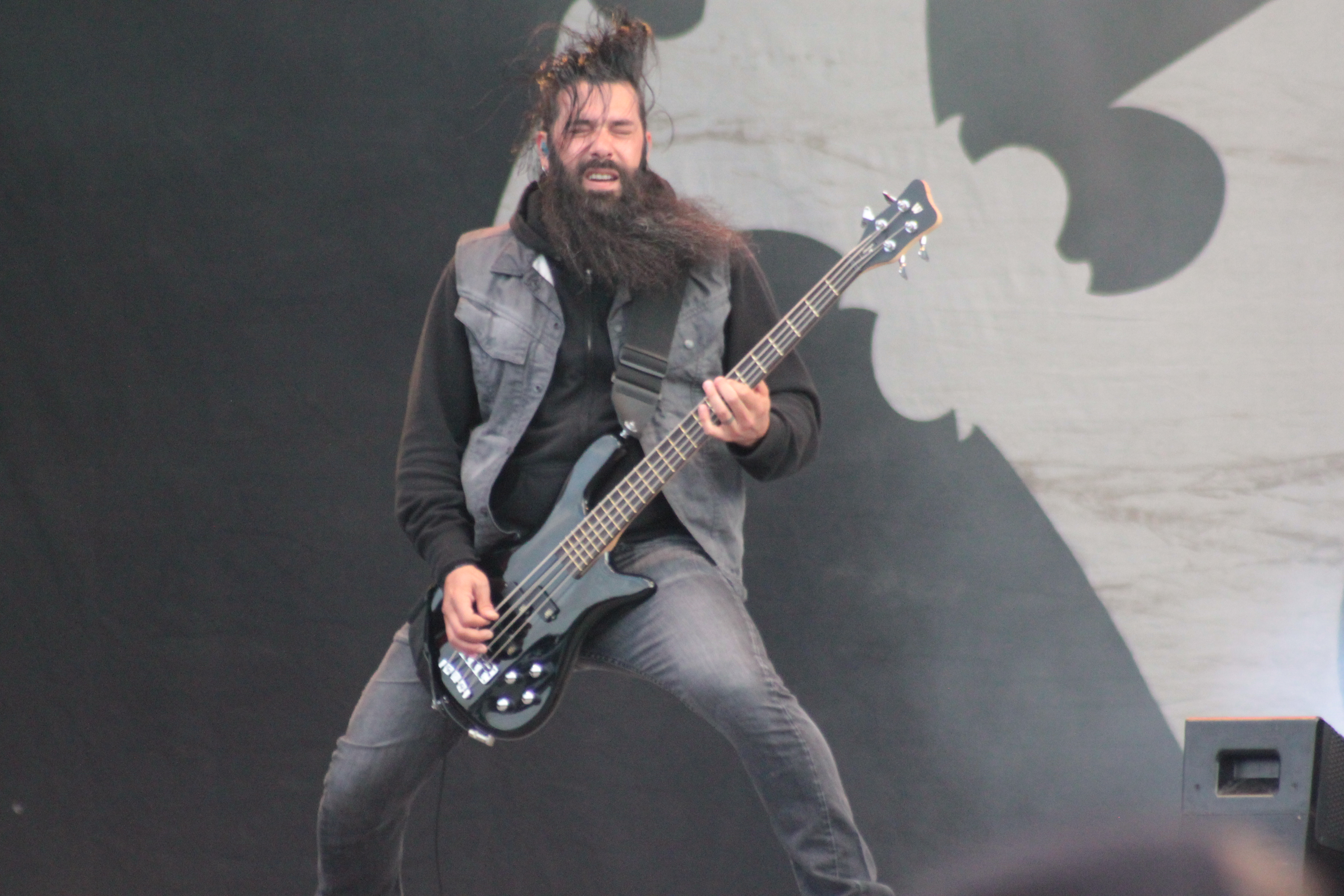
Johny Chow performing in 2013

It was announced via Instagram on May 3, 2012, that bassist Shawn Economaki had parted ways with the band on amicable terms. He was replaced in the studio by current Skid Row bassist Rachel Bolan. Stone Sour started recording their fourth studio album in early 2012. Corey Taylor stated that the album would end up being a double album or concept album, and described the album's sound as "Pink Floyd's The Wall meets Alice in Chains's Dirt". It was later announced that the new material would be released as two separate albums. The first album, House of Gold & Bones – Part 1 was released worldwide on October 23, 2012, and the second album House of Gold & Bones – Part 2 was released worldwide on April 9, 2013. The project also has a 4-part graphic novel series that accompanies the albums, telling the linear storyline featured in the twin albums' lyrics.

The first two songs from Part 1, "Gone Sovereign" and the first official single, "Absolute Zero" were released for radio airplay in mid/late August 2012. The first single from House of Gold & Bones Part 2 was "Do Me a Favor". It was released digitally on February 12. Guitarist Josh Rand stated in an interview with O2 Academy that there was a song recorded for Part 1, an instrumental which was deemed 'not up to par' by the band. The song will likely be released in the future once James Root and Josh Rand do 'some stuff to it guitar-wise'.

On October 5, 2012, Johny Chow of Fireball Ministry and Cavalera Conspiracy was announced as the bassist for the band on the House of Gold & Bones tour cycle. Stone Sour subsequently played Soundwave Festival 2013 in Australia and on the Sunday at Download Festival 2013. Guitarist James Root did not tour with Stone Sour in the winter of 2013, as he had to take a brief hiatus from the group to work on .5: The Gray Chapter with Slipknot, although it was later revealed that he was fired from the band due to musical differences. He claimed that the band wanted to focus on "radio play and money," which Root fought against, leading to his departure.

=== The Burbank EP duology (2014–2016) ===
On October 5, 2014, it was announced via Stone Sour's Facebook page that the band had begun recording a covers EP, which is due to be titled Meanwhile in Burbank... and released in 2015. Corey Taylor stated about the covers EP: "This is something that we've been talking about since the first album came out, with [Stone Sour]. We've always wanted to do this. Even as people have come, people have gone, this is still something we've always come back to, and we just never had the opportunity to do it. And we just kind of said, 'Well, screw it.'" On February 9, 2015, Stone Sour released an official music video and track, which is a cover version of Metal Church's song "The Dark". The EP was released on April 18, 2015. Corey Taylor confirmed that two more covers EPs are to be produced, they will be titled Straight Outta Burbank and No Sleep Till Burbank and will feature covers of songs by Rage Against The Machine, Mötley Crüe, Bad Brains and Violent Femmes.

Straight Outta Burbank..., the second volume in the series, has since been released.

Per Blabbermouth.net, On March 29, 2016, frontman Corey Taylor told the "Someone Who Isn't Me" podcast: "Originally we were going to do three [covers EPs], and now it sounds like we're just going to do the two and just keep the other stuff we recorded as extra content for when we make the next album."

=== Hydrograd (2017–2019) ===
On July 26, 2016, Taylor announced the band had written and demoed 18 songs for their sixth studio album, with plans to enter the studio in January for a likely mid-2017 release. On January 23, 2017, Taylor revealed that the band was in the process of recording their upcoming album named Hydrograd. Taylor indicated that the album would incorporate heavy metal elements found in previous releases, alongside hard rock styles. Four singles have been released ahead of the album in promotion; "Fabuless", "Song #3", "Taipei Person/Allah Tea" and "Mercy" (A live recording from Sphere Studios), with St. Marie being released as single following the album's release. Hydrograd released worldwide on June 30, 2017, to generally positive reviews.

On November 6, 2019, the band announced that they would be releasing a live album titled, Hello, You Bastards: Live in Reno, on December 13 of the same year.

=== Indefinite hiatus (2020–present) ===
On August 10, 2020, Taylor announced on 'The Green Room with Neil Griffiths' podcast that Stone Sour was taking a hiatus, saying: "I feel like Stone Sour has kinda run its course for now," "We all talked as a band and decided to kinda put Stone Sour in indefinite hiatus. That's the way it is. We've put it on the shelf for now. Everyone's kind of going and doing their own thing."

== Musical style ==
Their style has been described as alternative metal, hard rock, post-grunge, and alternative rock. Their music features double bass drum patterns, heavy guitar riffs, dual guitar harmonies, and a combination of screaming and singing.

Guitarist Josh Rand stated in an interview that he tries to bring a metal aspect and elements of thrash metal in their music. He also stated that his writing style is different than Slipknot's writing style.

Stone Sour's fourth and fifth albums, House of Gold & Bones - Part 1 and Part 2 are notable for their concept album format, and have led to comparisons to progressive rock bands. When asked about this, Josh Rand stated: "I still think it's us. We never said that we would be Genesis or Dream Theater or Yes or any of those types of bands. We're not a prog band. We said we're going to adopt the ideas of those stories and stuff, but it's still going to be a Stone Sour record, where you can still pull those individual songs. We just wanted to offer something more - in a world where it's all about singles, we just wanted to do something different. We've always evolved from record to record, if you listen to our entire catalog."

== Band members ==
Last active lineup

- Corey Taylor – lead vocals, rhythm guitar, piano (1992–1993, 1994–1997, 2000–2020), lead guitar (2000)
- Josh Rand – rhythm guitar (1993, 2001–2020), bass (2000), lead guitar (1993, 2000–2020)
- Roy Mayorga – drums, keyboards (2006–2020)
- Johny Chow – bass, backing vocals (2012–2020)
- Christian Martucci – lead guitar, backing vocals (2014–2020)

Former members

- Joel Ekman – drums (1992–1993, 1994–1997, 2000–2006)
- Denny Harvey – lead guitar (1992, 1993; guest 1994)
- Marty Smith – lead guitar (1992–1993)
- Tony S. – bass (1992–1993)
- Shawn Economaki – lead guitar (1993), bass (1994–1997, 2001–2012)
- Todd Smith – bass (1993)
- Josh Ryling – lead guitar (1994–1995)
- B.J. Harrison – rhythm and lead guitar (1994)
- Jim Root – lead guitar (1996–1997, 2001–2014), backing vocals (2012–2013)
- Bruce Swink – rhythm and lead guitar (1997)

Former touring musicians

- Jason Christopher – bass, backing vocals (2011)
- Mike Portnoy – drums (2011)
- Jonah Nimoy – guitar (2018)
- R.J. Ronquillo – guitar (2018)

=== Recording timeline ===
Role	Album					
Role	Stone Sour (2002)	Come What(ever) May (2006)	Audio Secrecy (2010)	House of Gold & Bones – Part 1 (2012)	House of Gold & Bones – Part 2 (2013)	Hydrograd (2017)
Lead vocals, additional guitar	Corey Taylor	Corey Taylor	Corey Taylor	Corey Taylor	Corey Taylor	Corey Taylor
Lead guitar	Jim Root	Jim Root	Jim Root	Jim Root	Jim Root	Christian Martucci
Rhythm guitar	Josh Rand	Josh Rand	Josh Rand	Josh Rand	Josh Rand	Josh Rand
Bass	Shawn Economaki/Josh Rand	Shawn Economaki	Shawn Economaki	Rachel Bolan (session musician)	Rachel Bolan (session musician)	Johny Chow
Drums	Joel Ekman/Dan Spain	Roy Mayorga	Roy Mayorga	Roy Mayorga	Roy Mayorga	Roy Mayorga

== Discography ==
Studio albums

- Stone Sour (2002)
- Come What(ever) May (2006)
- Audio Secrecy (2010)
- House of Gold & Bones – Part 1 (2012)
- House of Gold & Bones – Part 2 (2013)
- Hydrograd (2017)

== Accolades ==
Grammy Awards

Year	Nominee / work	Award	Result
2003	"Get Inside"	Grammy Award for Best Metal Performance	Nominated
2004	"Inhale"	Grammy Award for Best Metal Performance	Nominated
2007	"30/30-150"	Grammy Award for Best Metal Performance	Nominated

Revolver Golden Gods

Year	Nominee / work	Award	Result
2013	Roy Mayorga	Golden Gods Award for Best Drummer	Nominated
2013	Corey Taylor	Golden Gods Award for Best Vocalist	Won
2012	"House of Gold & Bones - Part 1"	Golden Gods Award for Album of the Year	Nominated

Metal Hammer Golden Gods Awards

Year	Nominee / work	Award	Result
2013	Stone Sour	Best International Band	Won

Loudwire Music Awards

Year	Nominee / work	Award	Result
2012	Stone Sour	Rock Band of the Year	Won
2017	Stone Sour	Hard Rock Artist of the Year	Won
2017	Hydrograd	Hard Rock Album of the Year	Won
2017	Corey Taylor	Best Vocalist	Nominated

Bandit Rock Awards

Year	Nominee / work	Award	Result
2018	Hydrograd	Best International Album	Won
