= Through Glass =

2006 single by Stone Sour

Single by Stone Sour

from the album Come What(ever) May
- Released: July 22, 2006
- Genre: Alternative rock; post-grunge
- Length: 4:43 (album version); 3:54 (radio edit)
- Label: Roadrunner
- Songwriters: Shawn Economaki; Josh Rand; Jim Root; Corey Taylor
- Producer: Nick Raskulinecz

Stone Sour singles chronology
"30/30-150" (2006)	"Through Glass" (2006)	"Sillyworld" (2007)

Music video
- "Through Glass" on YouTube

"Through Glass" is a song by American alternative metal band Stone Sour, released as the second single from their second album Come What(ever) May on July 22, 2006. It reached the number one spot on the Billboard Hot Mainstream Rock Tracks chart in the US, where it remained for seven weeks, and number two on the Alternative Songs chart. The song also peaked at number 39 on the Billboard Hot 100 after crossing over to pop radio. It remains their most popular song to date. The single's cover features the band's hometown of Des Moines, Iowa. "Through Glass" was certified 2× platinum in Australia, Canada and New Zealand, platinum in the United States, and gold in the United Kingdom.

The song's music was described as "melodically haunting" by Consequence.

== Background ==
The song was originally inspired by frontman Corey Taylor's outrage at the music industry and how he felt that the musical revolution had never taken place. Taylor was quoted as having said:

I remember exactly where I was. It was 2004 and I was on tour with Slipknot. I was sitting in a European hotel room watching a music video channel, seeing act after act after act of this inane, innocuous, plastic music. They were plastic, bubbly, gossamer-thin groups where it was really more about the clothes they wore and the length of their cheekbones than it was about the content of the song they were singing. It really made me mad. I was like, "Is this it? Have we just gone full circle? Did the singer/songwriter revolution never happen? Is it just the same drivel from the same replicate over and over again?" ... "Through Glass" is really a very angry song. It's me basically calling bullshit on pretty much everyone involved with the American Idol-type shows. It has its place, but when you're basically cornering the market and making it very hard for anyone who actually writes their own music to get ahead, then it's wrong and that's really why I wrote this song.

Years later, Taylor elaborated on the origins of the song, saying that he watched so much European music television because he was suffering from food poisoning in Sweden and was unable to move and change the channel from MTV Europe.

== Music video ==
The music video for "Through Glass" was shot with director Tony Petrossian and included a cameo by Poison guitarist C.C. Deville. The video begins with Corey Taylor singing the intro while sitting in a chair. He gets up to reveal that the video is taking place at a house party, and it subsequently goes through close-ups of the guests. A shot of a waitress bringing a plate of a plywood cutout of food is also shown. As the video progresses, the band begins to perform in front of the Hollywood Sign, spelled as "Hollowood". Taylor walks through a pool and sings the rest of the song. Two men are shown to actually be plywood cutouts, which are then taken away. Another set of people are also plywood cutouts who are then taken away. As the video continues, the whole set is shown to be made up of plywood cutouts, which are taken away. When the band finishes, they walk away, revealing that the place in which they were performing was also made of plywood cutouts.

== Track listing ==
CD single enhanced Australia and Europe (2006)
No.	Title	Length
1.	"Through Glass" (single edit)	4:01
2.	"Fruitcake"	3:58
3.	"Suffer"	3:40
4.	"Through Glass" (video)	4:01

CD single Europe / Promo CD single Germany (2006)
No.	Title	Length
1.	"Through Glass" (radio edit)	4:01
2.	"Through Glass" (album version)	4:40

Promo CD single US (2006)
No.	Title	Length
1.	"Through Glass" (edit)	4:01
2.	"Through Glass" (album version)	4:40
3.	"Call-Out Hook #1"	0:18
4.	"Call-Out Hook #2"	0:21
5.	"Call-Out Hook #3"	0:17

== Charts ==
=== Weekly charts ===
Weekly chart performance for "Through Glass"
Chart (2006)	Peak position
Canada Rock Top 30 (Radio & Records)	1
Germany (GfK)	95
Netherlands (Dutch Top 40)	14
Netherlands (Single Top 100)	32
New Zealand (Recorded Music NZ)	37
Scottish Singles Sales (Official Charts)	61
UK Singles (Official Charts)	98
UK Rock & Metal (Official Charts)	4
US Billboard Hot 100	39
US Alternative Airplay (Billboard)	2
US Adult Pop Airplay (Billboard)	12
US Mainstream Rock (Billboard)	1
US Pop Airplay (Billboard)	23

=== Year-end charts ===
2006 year-end chart performance for "Through Glass"
Chart (2006)	Position
Netherlands (Dutch Top 40)	113
US Alternative Songs (Billboard)	13
US Mainstream Rock Songs (Billboard)	8

2007 year-end chart performance for "Through Glass"
Chart (2007)	Position
US Alternative Songs (Billboard)	32
US Mainstream Rock Songs (Billboard)	37

== Certifications ==
Certifications for "Through Glass"
Region	Certification	Certified units/sales
Australia (ARIA)	2× Platinum	140,000^{‡}
Canada (Music Canada)	2× Platinum	160,000^{‡}
New Zealand (RMNZ)	2× Platinum	60,000^{‡}
United Kingdom (BPI)	Gold	400,000^{‡}
United States (RIAA)	Platinum	1,000,000^{‡}
^{‡} Sales+streaming figures based on certification alone.

== Release history ==
Release dates and formats for "Through Glass"
Region	Date	Format	Label(s)	Ref.
—	July 22, 2006	—	—	
United States	October 10, 2006	Mainstream airplay	IDJMG	
