= Josh Rand =

American musician (born 1974)

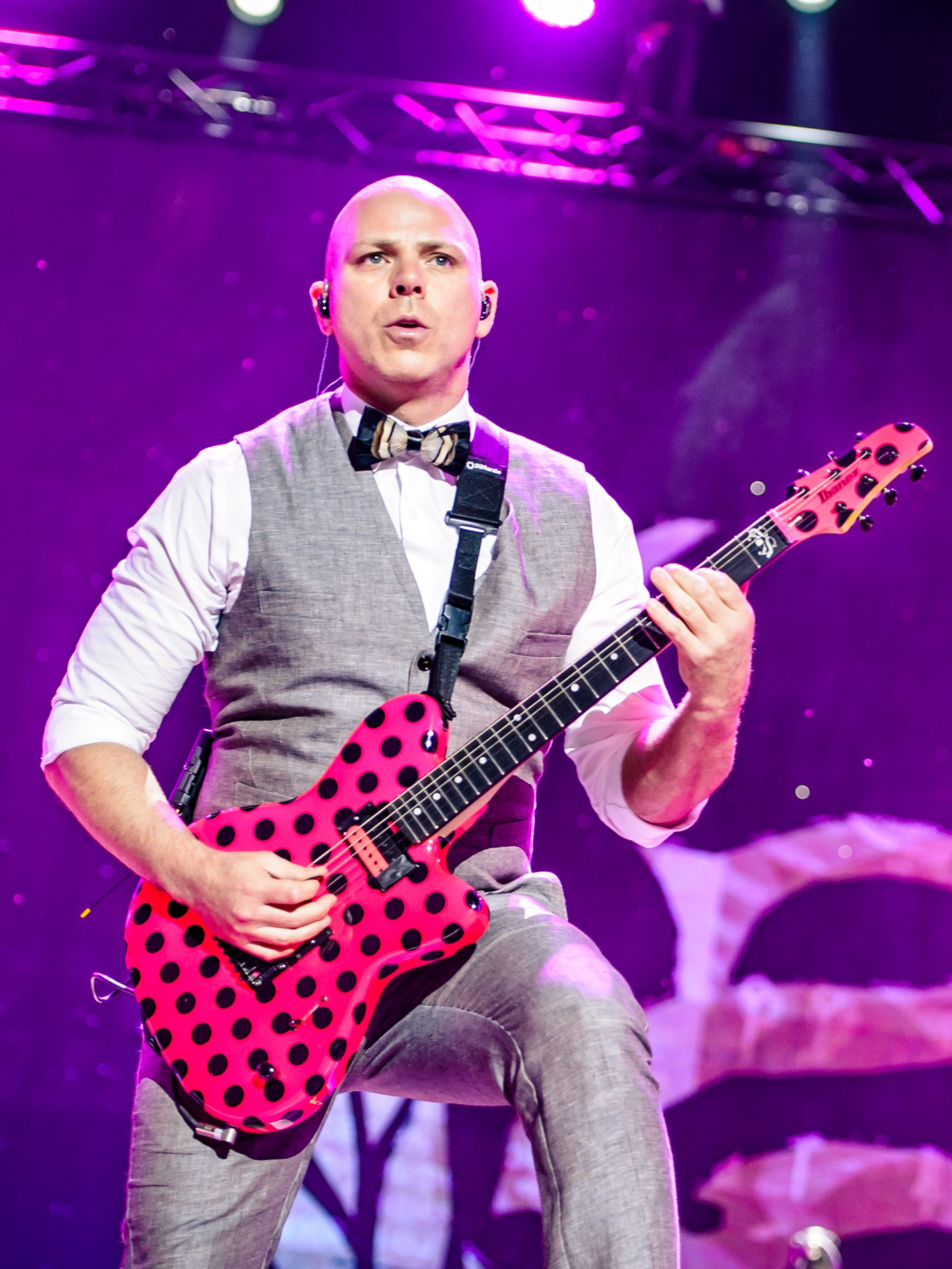
- Josh Rand performing live with Stone Sour in 2018.

Background information
- Born: August 19, 1974 (age 52)
- Origin: Des Moines, Iowa, United States
- Genres: Alternative metal; nu metal; post-grunge; alternative rock; pop rock
- Occupation: Musician
- Instruments: Guitar; bass; drums; keyboards
- Years active: 1993; 2000–present
- Label: Roadrunner

Josh Rand (born August 19, 1974) is an American musician best known as the rhythm guitarist of the band Stone Sour.

Josh Rand started playing bass guitar when he was 9, inspired by Billy Sheehan, Cliff Burton, Frankie Bello and Jason Newsted. He has known Corey Taylor since he was 15. The two played in several bands together before Josh switched to guitar at age 17. Rand has said that after hearing the band Racer X he knew playing the guitar was right for him. Rand earned a professional certificate in guitar from Berklee College of Music and is currently pursuing a master's degree in guitar there as well.

== Stone Sour ==
Josh Rand is the second longest-serving member of Stone Sour after Corey Taylor, they have both gone on to release six studio albums and two covers EP's with the band. Rand has stated that he adds elements of thrash metal in Stone Sour's music.

== Roadrunner United ==
In 2005, Roadrunner Records released Roadrunner United: The All-Star Sessions to celebrate the label's 25th birthday. Josh Rand, along with Jesse Leach (Killswitch Engage, Seemless, The Empire Shall Fall), Matt Heafy (Trivium), Mike D'Antonio (Killswitch Engage, ex-Overcast, Death Ray Vision) and Johnny Kelly (Type O Negative) contributed a track "Blood & Flames".

== Moonshot ==
Josh Rand has teamed up with Lindsay Robins, Canadian singer-songwriter, and together they make up the hard rock band Moonshot. The band played 2 shows in Toronto and New York in January 2009 and released four songs on band's MySpace page — "Blood Red", "Feedback", "Instant Revolution" and "Riptide", three of which soon became Stone Sour's songs "Unfinished", "Mission Statement" and "Sadist". Moonshot also included Justin Bunn on bass guitar and Graham Leduc on drums

== Other projects ==
In 2013 Josh Rand released an instructional DVD called The Sound and the Story. The DVD series takes you behind the scenes with Stone Sour guitarist Josh Rand, it features guitar contents, lessons, exercises, interviews, gear tours, and more.

When Stone Sour went on hiatus in 2020, Rand teamed up with Paralandra vocalist Casandra Carson to form LIFE Project. Their debut single was released in April 2021.

== Discography ==
Stone Sour

- 2002: Stone Sour
- 2006: Come What(ever) May
- 2007: Live in Moscow
- 2010: Audio Secrecy
- 2012: Live in Brighton
- 2012: House of Gold & Bones – Part 1
- 2013: House of Gold & Bones – Part 2
- 2015: Meanwhile in Burbank...
- 2015: Straight Outta Burbank...
- 2017: Hydrograd
- 2018: Hydrograd Acoustic Sessions
- 2019: Hello, You Bastards: Live in Reno

Roadrunner United

- 2005: The All-Star Sessions

LIFE Project

- 2021: The L.I.F.E. Project
- 2022: Big F.O.U.R.

== Filmography ==
- 2010: The Making of Audio Secrecy
- 2013: Josh Rand: The Sound and The Story
