= Black (surname) =

Black is a surname which can be of either English, Scottish, Irish or French origin. In the cases of non-English origin, the surname is likely to be an Anglicisation. Notable people with the name include:

== List ==
=== A ===
- Aaron Black (disambiguation), multiple people
- Adam Black (disambiguation), multiple people
- Adrianne Black (born 1989), American former white supremacist and memoirist
- Ahmad Black (born 1988), American football player
- Aleister Black (born 1985), WWE ring name of Dutch professional wrestler Tom Büdgen
- Aline Elizabeth Black, African-American schoolteacher
- Alan Black (disambiguation), multiple people
- Alan W. Black, Scottish computer scientist
- Alexander Black (disambiguation), multiple people
- Alf Black, English footballer
- Allison Black, American military officer
- Alonzo Black (born 1945), American sheriff
- Alyse Black, American singer and songwriter
- Alyssa Black, American politician
- Amanda Black (born 1993), South African singer and songwriter
- Amanda Black (epidemiologist), Northern Irish epidemiologist
- Amanda Black (soil chemist), New Zealand soil chemist
- Amy Black (mezzo-soprano) (1973–2009), British mezzo-soprano singer
- Andrew Black (disambiguation), multiple people
- Andy Black (born 1965), Irish poker player
- Angela Black, American television news anchor and reporter
- Ann Black, British Labour Party official
- Ann Spence Black (1861–1947), British artist
- Annesley Black (born 1979), Canadian composer
- Annie Black (born 1981), American politician
- Anthony Black (born 2004), American professional basketball player
- Anthony S. Black (born 1951), American jockey
- Arthur Black (disambiguation), multiple people
- Aurelia Zwartte (bap. 1682), Dutch poet

=== B ===
- Barry Black (born 1948), United States Navy admiral and Seventh-Day Adventist minister
- Baxter Black (1945–2022), American poet
- Ben Black, rugby league player
- Bethany Black (born 1978), English stand-up comedian, actress and writer
- Bill Black (disambiguation), multiple people
- Bo Black (1946–2020), American model
- Bob Black (born 1951), American anarchist and author
- Bobby Black (disambiguation), multiple people
- Bruce D. Black (born 1947), American judge
- Bud Black (born 1957), American baseball player
- Bud Black (right-handed pitcher) (1932–2005), American baseball player
- Byron Black (born 1969), Zimbabwean tennis player

=== C ===
- Cara Black (born 1979), Zimbabwean tennis player
- Cara Black (author) (born 1951), American mystery writer
- Carla DeSantis Black (born 1958), American writer and advocate
- Carol Black, multiple people
- Catherine Black (disambiguation), multiple people
- Cilla Black (1943–2015), English singer and actor
- Chante Black (born 1985), American basketball player
- Charles Black (disambiguation), multiple people
- Charly Black (born 1980), Jamaican reggae artist
- Christina Black (born 1987), Canadian Curler
- Chris Black (disambiguation), multiple people
- Claude Black (minister) (1916–2009), American Baptist minister and politician
- Claude Black (musician) (1933–2013), American jazz pianist
- Claudia Black (born 1972), Australian actor
- Clint Black (born 1962), American country music singer-songwriter
- Cofer Black (born 1950), American government official
- Colin Black, Australian composer/sound artist
- Conrad Black (born 1944), member of the House of Lords (Baron Black of Crossharbour)
- Crosby M. Black (1866–1916), American politician
- Cyril Black (1902–1991), British Conservative politician (MP)
- Cyril Edwin Black (1915–1989), American professor of modern Russian history

=== D ===
- Dan Black (born 1975), English singer-songwriter and vocalist
- Dan Black (baseball) (born 1987), American professional baseball player
- Dan A. Black (born 1955), American economist and professor
- David Black (disambiguation), multiple people
- Davidson Black (1884–1934), Canadian paleoanthropologist
- Dawn Black (born 1943), Canadian politician
- Dawn Black (Scottish politician), Scottish politician
- Dean Black, American politician
- Deborah Black (born 1958), Canadian philosopher
- Diane Black (born 1951), American politician
- Diboué Black, Cameroonian singer, composer and musical producer
- Dick Black (disambiguation), multiple people
- Dj Black, Ghanaian disc jockey and media personality
- Don Black (disambiguation), multiple people
- Donald Black (disambiguation), multiple people
- Dorothy Black (disambiguation), multiple people
- Douglas Black (disambiguation), multiple people
- Duncan Black (1908–1991), Scottish economist
- Dustin Lance Black (born 1974), American screenwriter

=== E ===
- Edward Black (disambiguation), multiple people
- Edwin Black, American journalist
- Edwin Black (rhetorician) (1929–2007), American scholar of rhetorical criticism
- Ellie Black (born 1995), Canadian Olympian artistic gymnast
- Eric Black, Scottish Footballer
- Eugene Black (disambiguation), multiple people
- Eli Black, CEO who also committed suicide

=== F ===
- Fischer Black (1938–1995), American economist
- Frances Black (born 1960), Irish singer and politician
- Francis Black (disambiguation), multiple people
- Frank Black (disambiguation), multiple people
- Freya Black (born 2001), British Olympic sailor

=== G ===
- Gary Black (disambiguation), multiple people
- Gaye Black, English punk-rock musician
- George Black (disambiguation), multiple people
- Gladys Black (1909–1998), American ornithologist

=== H ===
- Halfdan the Black, 9th century Norse king
- Harry Black (disambiguation), multiple people
- Henry Black (disambiguation), multiple people
- Holly Black (born 1971), American writer and editor
- Hugh Black (disambiguation), multiple people
- Hugo Black (1886–1971), American Supreme Court justice
- Hugo Black Jr. (1922–2013), American lawyer
- Hugo Black III (1953–2007), American lawyer

=== I ===
- Ian Black (disambiguation), multiple people
- Ira Black (born 1971), American heavy metal musician

=== J ===
- Jack Black (disambiguation), multiple people
- James Black (disambiguation), multiple people
- Jason Black (musician), American musician
- Jason Lyle Black, American pianist, composer, and artist
- Jaymes Black, American nonprofit executive
- Jeanne Black (1937–2014), American country singer
- Jeff Black (disambiguation), multiple people
- Jeremy Black (disambiguation), multiple people
- John Black (disambiguation), multiple people
- Jordan Black (disambiguation), multiple people
- Joseph Black (disambiguation), multiple people
- Judith Black, American professional storyteller
- Jully Black (born 1977), Canadian singer, songwriter and actress
- June Black (1910–2009), New Zealand ceramic artist and painter
- J. R. Black (1826–1880), Scottish publisher and journalist

=== K ===
- Kaelon Black (born 2001), American football player
- Karla Black (born 1972), Scottish sculptor
- Karen Black (1939–2013), American actor
- Kevin Black (disambiguation), multiple people
- Kodak Black (born 1997), American rapper
- Korie Black (born 2002), American football player

=== L ===
- Lanie Black (1946–2010), American politician
- Larry Black (disambiguation)
- Laura Black (disambiguation), multiple people
- Lawrence Black (cricketer) (1881–1959), English cricketer
- Lawrence Black (historian), English historian
- Leaky Black (born 1999), American basketball player
- Leron Black (born 1996), American professional basketball player
- Lewis Black (born 1948), American comedian, author and playwright
- Lori Black (born 1954), American musician
- Lou Black (1901–1965), American Jazz era banjo player
- Louis Black, American journalist and businessman
- Lucas Black (born 1982), American actor
- Luke Black (born 1992), Serbian singer and songwriter

=== M ===
- Margot Black (born 1987), American activist and lobbyist
- Mari Black, American multistyle violinist, fiddler, and composer
- Marlon Black (born 1975), Trinidadian cricketer
- Mary Black (disambiguation), multiple people
- Mason Black (born 1999), American baseball player
- Matt Black, multiple people
- Matthew Black (1908–1994), Scottish minister and biblical scholar
- Max Black (disambiguation), multiple people
- Maxine Black (disambiguation), multiple people
- Maurice Black (disambiguation), multiple people
- Mhairi Black (born 1994), Scottish National Party politician
- Michael Black (disambiguation), multiple people
- Michelle Black, American author
- Milt Black (born 1949), Canadian ice hockey player
- Milton J. Black (1905–1970), American architect

=== N ===
- Neil Black (1932–2016), English oboist
- Nick Black (born 1951), British physician and health services researcher
- Nissim Black (born 1986), American-Israeli rapper
- Noel Black (1937–2014), American film director
- Norm Black (1927–2011), Australian rules footballer
- Norman Black (born 1957), American basketball player and coach
- Norman William Black (1931–1997), American federal judge

=== O ===
- Olivia Black (born 1994), Danish handball player

=== P ===
- Paul Black (disambiguation), multiple people
- Pauline Black (born 1953), English singer, actress and author
- Pearly Black (born 1967), Australian singer
- Percy Black (1877–1917), Australian soldier in World War I
- Peter Black (disambiguation), multiple people
- Pippa Black (born 1982), Australian actor
- P. J. Black (born 1981), South African-American professional wrestler
- Porcelain Black (born 1985), American singer-songwriter and rapper

=== Q ===
- Quincy Black (born 1984), American professional football player
- Qumain Black (born 1992), American professional football player

=== R ===
- Rachel Black, American politician
- Ralph Black (disambiguation), multiple people
- Randy Black (born 1963), Canadian rock and heavy metal drummer
- Ray Black Jr. (born 1991), American race car driver
- Rebecca Black (born 1997), American singer
- Richard Black (1921–2014), American artist and illustrator
- Robert Black (disambiguation), multiple people
- Roger Black (born 1966), British runner
- Roy Black (disambiguation), multiple people
- Rufus Black (born 1969), Australian academic

=== S ===
- Samuel Black (disambiguation), multiple people
- Sandra Black, Canadian physician and neurologist
- Sarah Hearst Black (1846–?), American social reformer
- Scott Black (disambiguation), multiple people
- Seona Black (born 1954), Scottish international lawn bowler
- Shane Black (born 1961), American screenwriter and film director
- Sheila Black, American poet
- Shirley Temple Black (1928–2014), American actress and diplomat
- Simon Black (born 1979), Australian rules football player and assistant coach
- Simon Black (English footballer) (born 1975), English professional footballer
- Skyh Black (born 1988), American actor, dancer and model
- Sophie Cabot Black (born 1958), American poet
- Spencer Black (born 1950), American politician
- Stanley Black (1913–2002), English bandleader and composer
- Stanley Black (businessman) (born 1932), American real estate investor and philanthropist
- Sterling Foster Black (1924–1996), American lawyer
- Steven Black (disambiguation), multiple people
- Sue Black (disambiguation), multiple people
- Susan Black (disambiguation), multiple people

=== T ===
- Tarik Black (born 1991), American basketball player
- Tarik Black (American football) (born 1998), American football player
- Taylor Black, American actress, producer and model
- Thomas Black (disambiguation), multiple people
- Tony Black (writer), Scottish crime writer
- Tori Black (born 1988), American pornographic actor
- Tornado Alicia Black (born 1998), American tennis player
- Tyler Black (disambiguation), multiple people

=== V ===
- Vic Black (born 1988), American professional baseball player

=== W ===
- Wayne Black (born 1973), Zimbabwean tennis player
- Will Black (born 2006), Canadian American football player
- William Black (disambiguation), multiple people

=== Y ===
- Yahya Black (born 2002), American football player

== Fictional characters ==
- Bazzard Black (Bazz-B), fictional character in the anime Bleach: Thousand-Year Blood War – Quincy. Sternritter.
- Bernard Black, fictional character in British sitcom Black Books
- Black family, fictional characters in Age of Empires III
- Billy Black, fictional character in the Twilight series
- Captain Black, fictional character in Captain Scarlet and the Mysterons
- Chantay Black, fictional character in Degrassi: The Next Generation
- Dr. Black, murder victim in British editions of the board game Cluedo
- Heather Haversham (also known as Heather Black), fictional character in the British soap opera Brookside
- Jacob Black, fictional character in the Twilight series
- James Black, fictional character and member of the FBI in Detective Conan.
- Jet Black, fictional character in the anime Cowboy Bebop
- Linda Black, Tolkien Black's mother from South Park
- Sirius Black, fictional character in the Harry Potter novels
- Steve Black, Tolkien Black's father from South Park
- Regulus Arcturus Black, fictional character in the Harry Potter novels
- Bellatrix Lestrange (née Black), fictional character in the Harry Potter novels
- Narcissa Malfoy (née Black), fictional character in the Harry Potter novels
- Noah Black (Centurius), a supervillain appearing in comic books published by Marvel Comics
- Nicholas Black, fictional character from the Channel 4 soap opera, Brookside
- Andromeda Tonks (née Black), fictional character in the Harry Potter novels
- Pitch Black, fictional character and the villain of the novels and movie of the Rise of the Guardians
- Tolkien Black, a character from South Park
- Zamasu (also known as Goku Black), fictional character in the Dragon Ball Super fanime
- Jessica "Jess" Black, a side character and companion in the video game Far Cry 5
- Trooper Black, a minor character in the video game TimeSplitters 2

== See also ==
- Justice Black (disambiguation)
