= Bobby Black =

Bobby Black may refer to:

- Bobby Black (Scottish footballer) (c. 1927–2012), Scottish footballer
- Bobby Black (footballer, born 1915) (1915–1979), English footballer
- Bobby Black (journalist) (born 1973), senior editor of High Times magazine
- Bobby Black (rugby union) (1893–1916), New Zealand rugby union player

== See also ==
- Robert Black (disambiguation)
