= Senator Black =

Senator Black may refer to:

== Members of the Northern Irish Senate ==
- George Ruddell Black (1865/1866–1942), Northern Irish Senator in 1942

== Members of the United States Senate ==
- Hugo Black (1886–1971), U.S. Senator from Alabama from 1927 to 1937
- John Black (U.S. senator) (1800–1854), U.S. Senator from Mississippi from 1832 to 1838

== United States state senate members ==
- C. Ellis Black (born 1942), Georgia State Senate
- Dennis Black (born 1939), Iowa State Senate
- Diane Black (born 1951), Tennessee State Senate
- Dick Black (politician) (born 1944), Virginia State Senate
- George Robison Black (1835–1886), Georgia State Senate
- Henry Black (Maine politician) (1924–2002), Maine State Senate
- J. Graham Black (1889–1957), Florida State Senate
- John Black (Georgia politician) (1933–2017), Georgia State Senate
- John Black (Wisconsin politician) (1830–1899), Wisconsin State Senate
- Loring M. Black Jr. (1886–1956), New York State Senate
- Sterling Foster Black (1924–1996), New Mexico State Senate
- W. Rex Black (1920–2012), Utah State Senate
