= Henry Black =

Henry Black may refer to:

- Henry Black (Pennsylvania politician) (1783–1841), American Congressman from Pennsylvania
- Henry Black (Quebec judge) (1798–1873), Lower Canada judge
- Henry Black (American football) (born 1997), American football player
- Henry Black (Maine politician) (1924–2002), American politician from Maine
- Henry M. Black (1827–1893), United States Army officer
- H. N. Black (Henry Nelson Black, 1854–1922), American architect
- Kairakutei Black I (Henry James Black; 1858–1923), Australian-born rakugoka in Japan
- Henry Campbell Black (1860–1927), author of Black's Law Dictionary
- Henry Black (Saskatchewan politician) (1875–1960), former mayor of Regina, Saskatchewan
- Henry H. Black (1929–2012), Sergeant Major of the Marine Corps

== See also ==
- Henry the Black (disambiguation)
- Harry Black (disambiguation)
- Henry Blackall (1889–1981), Irish lawyer and judge
- Henry Blackman (disambiguation)
- Henry Blackwood (1770–1832), British vice admiral
