= Virginia Berridge =

British public health academic

Virginia Berridge FRHistS HonFRCP FAcSS
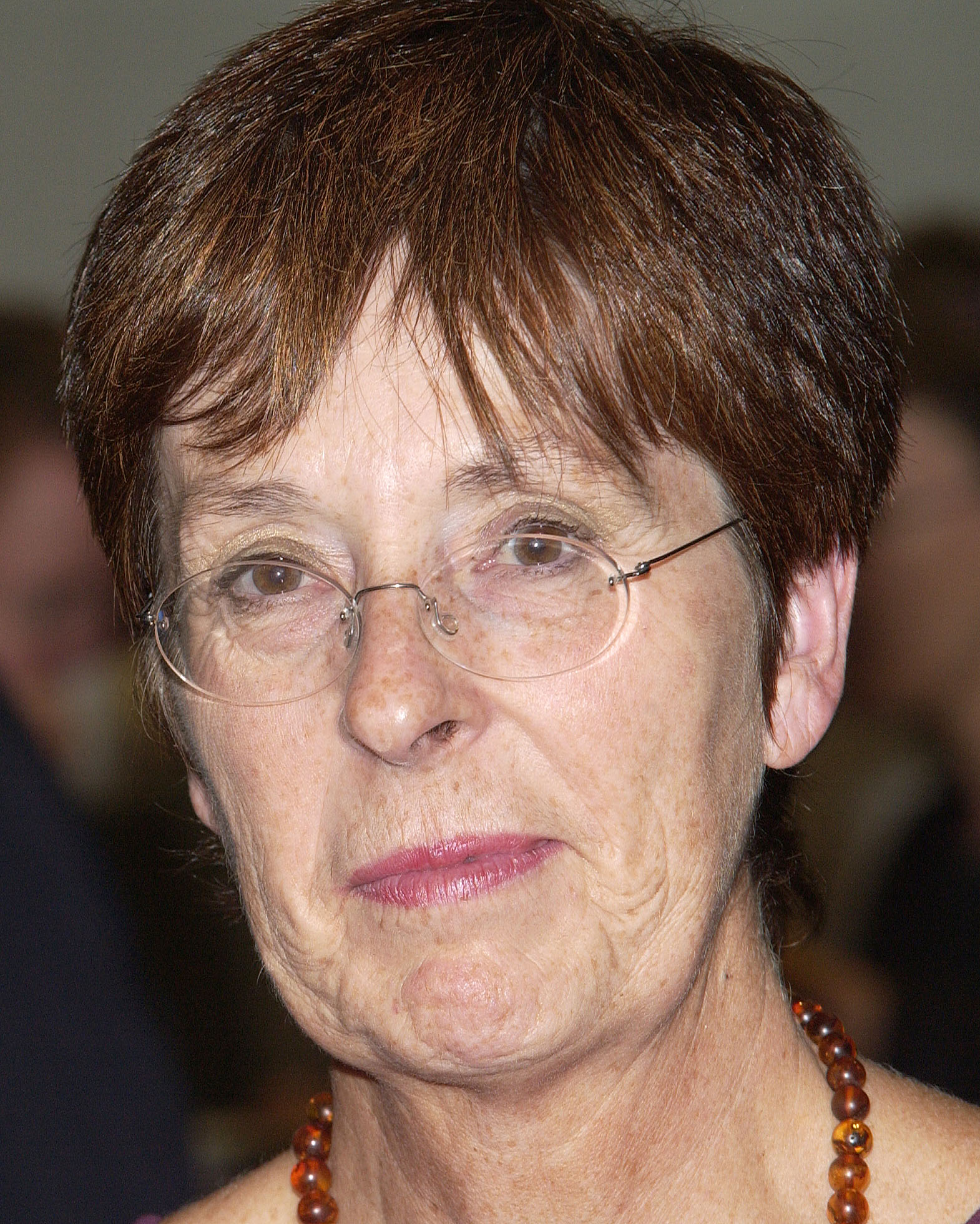
- Berridge in October 2004
- Born: 1946 (age 79–80)

Virginia Berridge, FRHistS, HonFRCP, FAcSS (born 1946) is a British academic historian and public health expert. She is a Professor of History and Director of the Centre for History in Public Health at the London School of Hygiene and Tropical Medicine. Berridge is a Fellow of the Academy of Social Sciences and the Royal Historical Society, and honorary Fellow of the Faculty of Public Health and of the Royal College of Physicians.

== Life ==
Berridge has a first degree and a PhD in history, both from the University of London, and is a Professor of History and Director of the Centre for History in Public Health at the London School of Hygiene and Tropical Medicine. She worked in the Addiction Research Unit of the Institute of Psychiatry from 1974 to 1979 and at the Economic and Social Research Council from 1986–1987. From 1979 to 88 she was at the Institute of Historical Research, University of London.

Berridge is an academic historian and public health expert. She researches the history of health and health policy. Recently she has published on the harm of e-cigarrettes and the policies around their availability and use. She is Deputy Chair of the London Drugs Commission, which is reporting on cannabis use for the London Mayor, and has served on the Alcohol Education Research Council. Alongside Dr Alastair Reid (Girton College), Professor Simon Szreter, (St John’s College, Cambridge), and Professor Pat Thane (King’s College London), Berridge is a founder of History & Policy, which publishes historical research freely online.

Berridge is a Fellow of the Academy of Social Sciences, a Fellow of the Royal Historical Society and honorary Fellow of the Faculty of Public Health and of the Royal College of Physicians.

== Selected works ==
- Opium and the People: Opiate Use in Nineteenth-Century England (1987)
- AIDS in the UK: The Making of Policy, 1981–1994 (1996)
- Marketing health: Smoking and the discourse of public health, 1945–2000 (2007)
- Demons: Our Changing Attitudes to Alcohol, Tobacco, and Drugs (2014)
- Public Health: A Very Short Introduction (2016)
- The Internationalisation of Tobacco Control, 1950-2010 (2016)
- Infiltrating history into the public health curriculum (2018)
