= Robert Black =

Robert Black may refer to:

== Sports ==
- Robert Black (American football), American former head coach for the Sewanee college football team
- Bobby Black (rugby union) (1893–1916), New Zealand rugby union player
- Bob Black (baseball) (1862–1933), American baseball player
- Bobby Black (Scottish footballer) (1927–2012), Scottish footballer
- Bobby Black (footballer, born 1915) (Robert Watson Black, 1915–1979), English footballer
- Robert Black (rower) (born 1992), Australian rower

== Writers ==
- Robert Black (author) (1829–1915), British author of fiction and nonfiction
- Robert Black, a pseudonym used by science fiction and fantasy author Robert Holdstock
- Bob Black (anarchist) (born 1951), American anarchist and lawyer
- Bobby Black (journalist) (born 1973), American senior editor of High Times magazine

== Musicians ==
- Robert Black (bassist) (1956–2023), American double bass player in the Bang on a Can All-Stars
- Robert Black (conductor) (1950–1993), American conductor, composer and pianist, who also appeared in Bang on a Can events

== Others ==
- Robert Black (Canadian politician) (born 1962), appointed to the Canadian Senate in 2018
- Robert Black (auditor) (1946–2021), public administrator, first auditor general for Scotland, 2000–2012
- Robert Black (advocate) (born 1947), professor emeritus of Scots law at the University of Edinburgh
- Robert Black (serial killer) (1947–2016), Scottish serial killer and sex offender
- Sir Robin Black (colonial administrator) (Robert Brown Black, 1906–1999), British governor of Singapore and Hong Kong
- Robert Black (mayor) (1868–1938), mayor of Dunedin, 1929–1933
- Robert Black (minister) (1752–1817), Irish Presbyterian minister
- Robert D. Black (born 1946), American professor of Renaissance history
- Robert Edward Black, American physician, epidemiologist, and global public health expert
- Robert P. Black (1927–2024), Federal Reserve economist
- Robert S. Black (1860–1834), Australian mine manager
- Rob Zicari (born 1974), aka Rob Black, American pornographer
- Robert Allan Black, American writer and director
