= Henry Blackman =

Henry Blackman may refer to:

- Henry Blackmon (1891–1924), American baseball player
- Henry E. Blackman (born 1820), American farmer and politician

== See also ==
- Henry Black (disambiguation)
- Harry Black (disambiguation)
