= Angela Black =

Angela Black may refer to:

- Angela Black (news anchor), American news anchor
- Angela Black (TV series), 2021 British TV series
