= Hugh Pemberton =

Hugh Pemberton may refer to:

- Hugh Pemberton (physician), English physician
- Hugh Pemberton (historian)
- Hugh Pemberton (MP) for City of London (Parliament of England constituency)
