= Larry Black =

Larry or Lawrence Black(e) may refer to:

- Larry Black (sprinter) (1951–2006), American sprinter
- Larry Black (American football) (born 1989), American football player
- Lawrence Black (cricketer) (1881–1959), English cricketer
- Lawrence Black (historian), English historian
- Lawrence Black, character in The City of Trembling Leaves
- Lawrence Blacke, candidate in Massachusetts general election, 1978
