= Joe Black (disambiguation) =

Joe Black (1924–2002) was an American right-handed pitcher in Negro league and Major League Baseball for the Brooklyn Dodgers, Cincinnati Redlegs, and Washington Senators.

Joe Black may also refer to:

- Joe Black (angel), the protagonist of the film Meet Joe Black
- Joe Black (album), a 1996 album by Malevolent Creation
- Meet Joe Black, a 1998 romantic drama film
- Joe Black (drag queen) (born 1989), drag queen and cabaret performer

== See also ==
- Joe Blackledge (1928–2008), cricketer
- Joseph Black (disambiguation)
