= Savannah, Ohio =

- Village
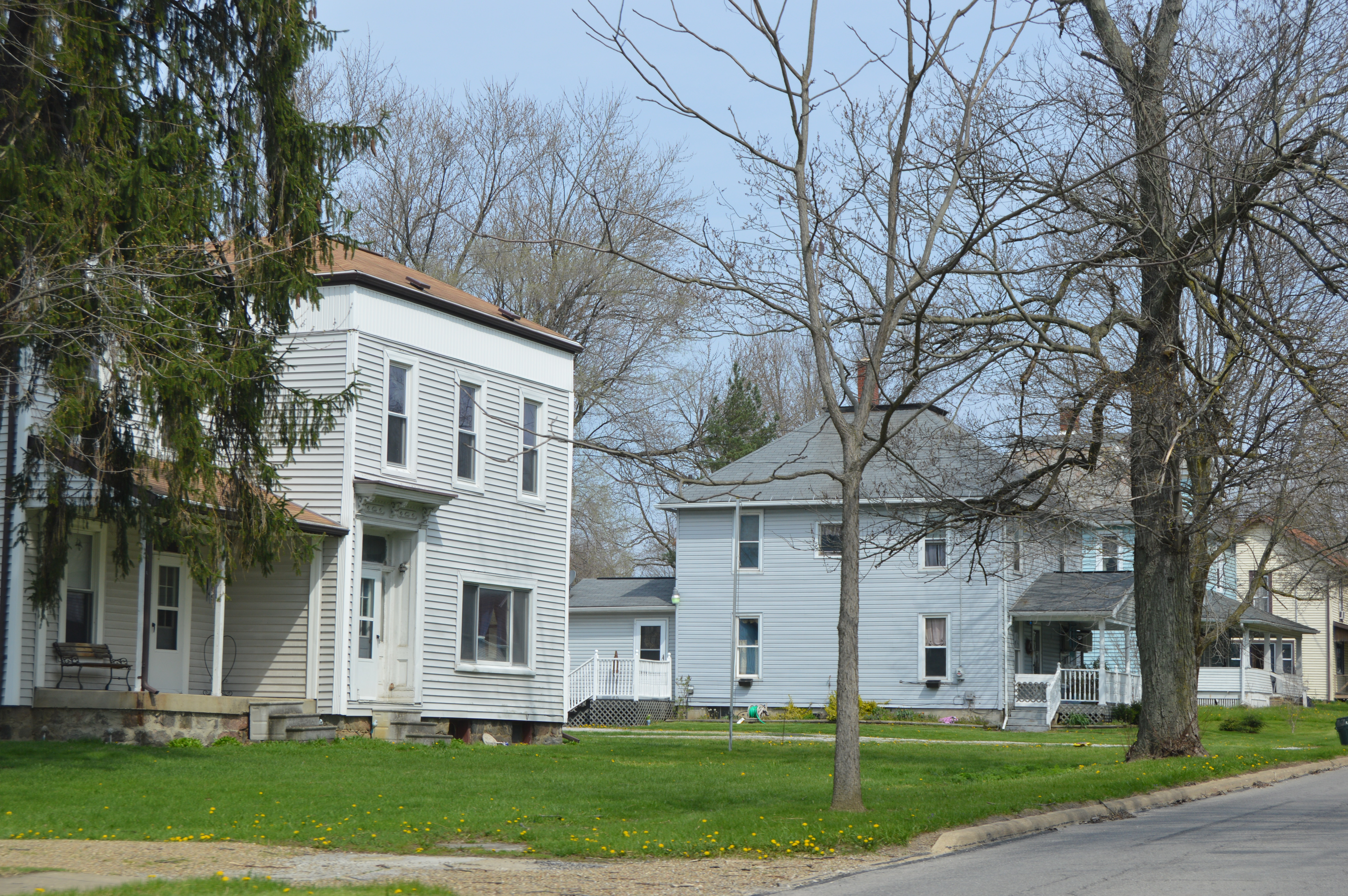
- Houses on South Main Street

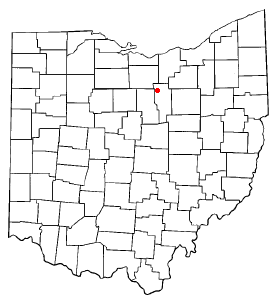
- Location of Savannah, Ohio

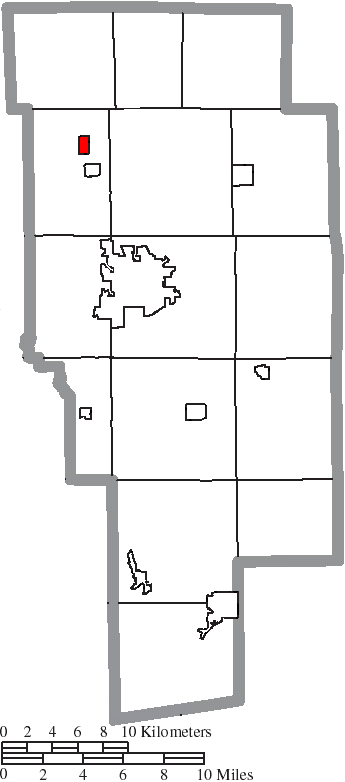
- Location of Savannah in Ashland County
- Coordinates: 40°58′05″N 82°22′15″W
- Country: United States
- State: Ohio
- County: Ashland
- Township: Clear Creek
- Founded: 1818

Area
  - Total: 0.57 sq mi (1.47 km^{2})
  - Land: 0.56 sq mi (1.45 km^{2})
  - Water: 0.0077 sq mi (0.02 km^{2})
- Elevation: 1,102 ft (336 m)

Population (2020)
  - Total: 329
  - Density: 587.1/sq mi (226.67/km^{2})
- Time zone: UTC-5 (Eastern (EST))
  - Summer (DST): UTC-4 (EDT)
- ZIP code: 44874
- Area code: 419
- FIPS code: 39-70576
- GNIS feature ID: 2399764

Savannah is a village in Clear Creek Township, Ashland County, Ohio, United States. The population was 329 at the 2020 census.

== History ==
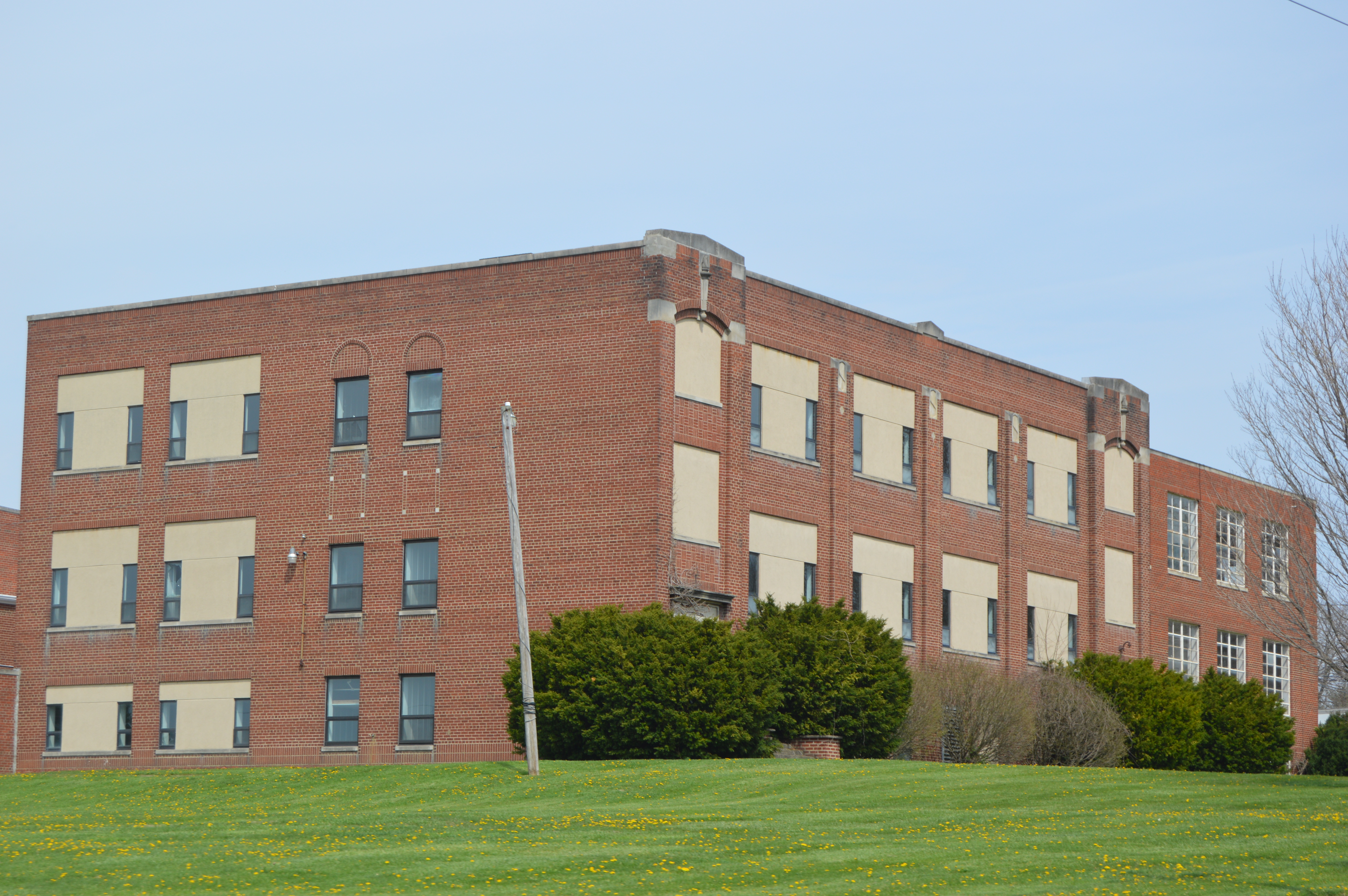
Former school

Savannah was laid out in 1818. A post office called Savannah has been in operation since 1839.

== Geography ==
Savannah is located along the Vermilion River.

According to the United States Census Bureau, the village has a total area of 0.58 square miles (1.50 km^{2}), of which 0.57 square miles (1.48 km^{2}) is land and 0.01 square miles (0.03 km^{2}) is water.

== Demographics ==
Historical population
Census	Pop.	Note	%±
1860	2,230		—
1870	394		−82.3%
1880	342		−13.2%
1890	325		−5.0%
1900	290		−10.8%
1910	262		−9.7%
1920	268		2.3%
1930	338		26.1%
1940	358		5.9%
1950	407		13.7%
1960	409		0.5%
1970	361		−11.7%
1980	351		−2.8%
1990	363		3.4%
2000	372		2.5%
2010	413		11.0%
2020	329		−20.3%
U.S. Decennial Census

=== 2010 census ===
As of the census of 2010, there were 413 people, 139 households, and 108 families living in the village. The population density was 724.6 inhabitants per square mile (279.8/km^{2}). There were 152 housing units at an average density of 266.7 per square mile (103.0/km^{2}). The racial makeup of the village was 97.3% White, 1.2% African American, 1.0% Native American, and 0.5% from two or more races. Hispanic or Latino people of any race were 1.7% of the population.

There were 139 households, of which 41.7% had children under the age of 18 living with them, 55.4% were married couples living together, 14.4% had a female householder with no husband present, 7.9% had a male householder with no wife present, and 22.3% were non-families. 20.1% of all households were made up of individuals, and 8.7% had someone living alone who was 65 years of age or older. The average household size was 2.97 and the average family size was 3.39.

The median age in the village was 33.3 years. 29.8% of residents were under the age of 18; 7.5% were between the ages of 18 and 24; 27.8% were from 25 to 44; 25.4% were from 45 to 64; and 9.4% were 65 years of age or older. The gender makeup of the village was 49.4% male and 50.6% female.

=== 2000 census ===
As of the census of 2000, there were 372 people, 134 households, and 103 families living in the village. The population density was 839.1 inhabitants per square mile (324.0/km^{2}). There were 147 housing units at an average density of 331.6 per square mile (128.0/km^{2}). The racial makeup of the village was 99.46% White, 0.27% African American and 0.27% Native American.

There were 134 households, out of which 38.8% had children under the age of 18 living with them, 62.7% were married couples living together, 6.7% had a female householder with no husband present, and 23.1% were non-families. 18.7% of all households were made up of individuals, and 8.2% had someone living alone who was 65 years of age or older. The average household size was 2.78 and the average family size was 3.20.

In the village, the population was spread out, with 30.1% under the age of 18, 9.4% from 18 to 24, 33.1% from 25 to 44, 18.0% from 45 to 64, and 9.4% who were 65 years of age or older. The median age was 33 years. For every 100 females there were 101.1 males. For every 100 females age 18 and over, there were 101.6 males.

The median income for a household in the village was $35,469, and the median income for a family was $38,182. Males had a median income of $33,333 versus $21,250 for females. The per capita income for the village was $14,546. About 8.7% of families and 9.6% of the population were below the poverty line, including 13.3% of those under age 18 and 14.7% of those age 65 or over.

== Notable people ==
- Sarah Hearst Black, social reformer
- Eunice Lea Kettering, composer
