= Sue Black =

Sue Black may refer to:

- Sue Black, Baroness Black of Strome (born 1961), Scottish forensic anthropologist
- Sue Black (computer scientist) (born 1962), English computer scientist

== See also ==
- Susan Black (disambiguation)
