= Jerry Black =

Jerry or Gerry Black may refer to:

- Jerry Black, see Gulf Breeze UFO incident
- Gerry Black, character in Man of Steel (musical)
- Gerry Black, actor in The Majestic (film)

== See also ==
- Jeremy Black (disambiguation)
- Jeremiah Black (1810–1883), American statesman and lawyer
- Gerard Black, musician
- Gerald Black, fictional character
