= Jeremy Black =

Jeremy Black may refer to:

- Sir Jeremy Black (Royal Navy officer) (1932–2015), British admiral
- Jeremy Black, drummer for Apollo Sunshine
- Jeremy Black (historian) (born 1955), British historian
- Jeremy Black (Assyriologist) (1951–2004), British Assyriologist and Sumerologist
- Jeremy Black, child actor in the 1978 film The Boys from Brazil
- Jeremy Black, co-founder of the acai-based company Sambazon

== See also ==
- Jerry Black (disambiguation)
