= Eunice Lea Kettering =

Eunice Lea Kettering (April 4, 1906 – March 9, 2000) was an American composer and professor. Kettering wrote many compositions and almost 20,000 copies of her work were published. She was the first woman in the United States to become a Fellow in the American Guild of Organists.

== Early life and death ==
Kettering was born in Savannah, Ohio on April 4, 1906. She became an orphan at the age of three and was adopted by Adam and Cora Kettering in Ashland, Ohio. Adam Kettering was a car dealer and was the brother of inventor Charles F. Kettering. She started composing music at age six. Kettering died in Albuquerque, New Mexico on March 9, 2000, at the age of 93.

== Education ==
Kettering attended the Oberlin Conservatory of Music, from which she received a Bachelor of Music degree in 1929. In 1931, she studied composition privately under Norman Lockwood, Felix Labunski, Edwin J. Stringham, and Béla Bartók. She later received a master of sacred music from the School of Sacred Music of the Union Theological Seminary in 1933.

== Career ==
Kettering was a professor at Madison University in Virginia for three years and then taught music for 23 years at Ashland University in Ohio. During her time at Ashland University, she composed and performed many of her works. After retiring early from teaching, she moved to Santa Fe, New Mexico in 1959 and then later moved to Albuquerque, New Mexico in 1962. While in Albuquerque, she composed the majority of her work and two of her compositions were recorded. Her compositions were performed in colleges, churches, universities, and on radio stations. Almost 20,000 copies of her work were published. She was a part of the National Association of American Composers and Conductors, Pi Kappa Lambda, and the National Federation of Music Clubs.

== Awards ==
The National Federation of Music Clubs awarded her first place in 1943 for her choral-orchestral composition Johnny Appleseed based on a Vachel Lindsay poem, a special individual award of merit in 1968, and a merit award for outstanding service to other composers in 1970. She later received first place in multiple categories by the National League of American Pen Women for secular choral compositions, piano compositions, and vocal solo-art song in 1972. In 1958, the Ashland, Ohio Junior Music Club was changed to the Eunice Lettering Music Club. In 1961, she won first place from the Annual Institute for Education by Radio and Television. She was the first woman to become a Fellow in the American Guild of Organists.
