= Max Black (disambiguation) =

Max Black may refer to:

- Max Black (1909–1988), British-American philosopher
- Max Black (politician) (1936–2023), American politician, Republican State Representative in Idaho
- Max Black, character in TV show 2 Broke Girls

== See also ==
- Maxine Black (disambiguation)
