= Doug Black (travel promoter) =

Canadian sportswriter and travel promoter

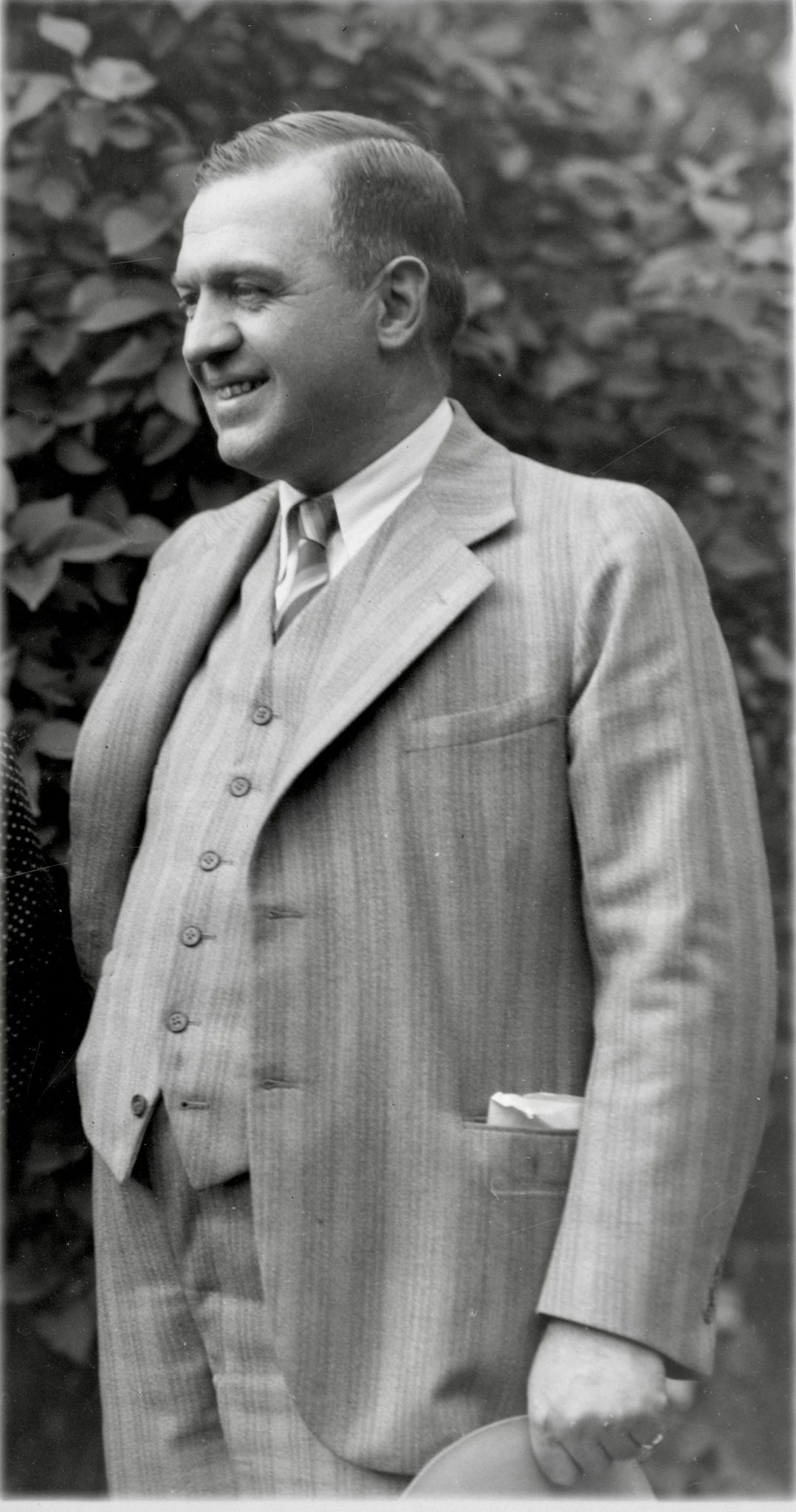
- Born: John Douglas Black; June 21, 1883; Fredericton, New Brunswick
- Died: May 29, 1931 (aged 47); Fredericton, New Brunswick
- Father: John Black

John Douglas Black (June 21, 1884 – May 29, 1930) was a Canadian sportswriter and travel promoter, who served as the first New Brunswick Travel Bureau director. He was credited for being a major influence on Tourism in New Brunswick in the early 20th century.

== Life and career ==
John Douglas Black was born on June 21, 1884, in Fredericton, New Brunswick, to barrister, politician, and Yukon public administrator John Black, and his wife, a founding member of the Imperial Order Daughters of the Empire. He attended the Davenport School in Saint John and received further education at the Upper Canada College in Toronto and the University of New Brunswick.

After graduating from university, Black started working for newspapers in Boston and New York City, the latter in which he tried studying Law before moving to Maine to work as a reporter. In 1901, he returned to Fredericton to serve as the sporting editor for The Fredericton Gleaner (now known as The Daily Gleaner). Throughout the 1920s, Black promoted New Brunswick as an adequate hunting place to Major League Baseball players. His efforts to promote New Brunswick were noticed by the provincial government, and in 1927 he became the New Brunswick Travel Bureau's first director upon its creation. In 1931, he further promoted hunting and fishing in New Brunswick by bringing with him to the White House a container with Atlantic salmon and venison.

== Death ==
Black died on May 29, 1931 at the Victoria Public Hospital in Fredericton, at the age of 47, following a seizure caused by appendicitis. He was buried at Forest Hill Cemetery in Fredericton two days later.
