= Hugh Pemberton (historian) =

Hugh R. Pemberton, FRHistS, is an academic historian specialising in the late twentieth-century British politics and British social and economic policy. As of 2018, he is Professor of Contemporary British History at the University of Bristol.

== Career ==
Pemberton spent a decade working in financial services as an analyst before moving into academia. He graduated from the Open University with a Bachelor of Arts degree, before completing a Master of Arts degree in contemporary history at the University of Bristol, here he also carried out doctoral studies; his PhD was awarded in 2001 for his thesis "The Keynesian-plus experiment: a study of social learning in the UK core executive, 1960–1966". He stayed on at Bristol as an Economic and Social Research Council postdoctoral fellow, before spending two years at the London School of Economics as a British Academy postdoctoral fellow. In 2004, he took up a lectureship at Bristol, where he is Professor of Contemporary British History as of 2018. He is also a Fellow of the Royal Historical Society.

Pemberton's research has focused on British economic and social policy since the Second World War. He has studied pensions, administration and the Civil Service, and party politics.

== Publications ==
- Policy Learning and British Governance in the 1960s, Transforming Government series (Palgrave Macmillan, 2004).
- (Co-editor with Lawrence Black) An Affluent Society?: Britain's Post-War "Golden Age" Revisited (Ashgate, 2004).
- (Co-editor with Pat Thane and Noel Whiteside) Britain's Pensions Crisis: History and Policy (Oxford University Press, 2006).
- (Co-editor with Lawrence Black and Pat Thane) Reassessing 1970s Britain (Manchester University Press, 2013).
