= Keith Breckenridge =

South African professor of history

Keith Breckenridge is a South African professor of history at the University of the Witwatersrand. He is a specialist in the cultural and economic history of South Africa, particularly the gold mining industry, and the development of information systems such as birth, marriage and death registration and identity verification systems.

== Early life ==
Breckenridge was born in Johannesburg in 1965 and attended Hilton College. He is a graduate of the University of the Witwatersrand and Johns Hopkins University and completed his PhD at Northwestern University in 1995.

== Career ==
Breckenridge is professor of history at the University of the Witwatersrand. He is a specialist in the cultural and economic history of South Africa, particularly the gold mining industry, and the development of information systems such as birth, marriage and death registration and identity verification systems.

With Simon Szreter he edited Registration and Recognition: Documenting the Person in World History which was published by Oxford University Press and The British Academy in 2012 as part of the proceedings of the British Academy based on a workshop held in Cambridge in 2010.

In 2014, he published Biometric State: The Global Politics of Identification and Surveillance in South Africa, 1850 to the Present, (Cambridge University Press, 2014) which was the inaugural winner of the Humanities Book Award of the Academy of Science of South Africa.

== Selected publications ==
- Registration and Recognition: Documenting the Person in World History. Oxford University Press & The British Academy, 2012. (Edited with Simon Szreter) (Proceedings of the British Academy) ISBN 978-0197265314
- Biometric State: The Global Politics of Identification and Surveillance in South Africa, 1850 to the Present. Cambridge University Press, Cambridge, 2014. ISBN 978-1107077843
