= Mary Black (disambiguation) =

Mary Black (born 1955) is an Irish folk singer.

Mary Black may also refer to:

- Mary Black (activist) (1950–2020), American activist
- Mary Black (artist) (c.1737–1814), English portrait painter
- Mary Black (historian) (1922–1992), American art historian
- Mary Black (Salem witch trials), American slave accused of witchcraft during the Salem witch trials
- Mary Ann Black (1801–1861), wife of Prosper de Mestre (1789–1844), French-Australian businessman
- MaryAnn Black (1943–2020), American social worker and politician
- Mary E. Black (1895–1988), Canadian occupational therapist, teacher, master weaver, and writer
- Mary Fleming Black (1848–1893), American author and religious worker
- Mary Holiday Black (c. 1934–2022), Navajo basket weaver
- Mary J. L. Black (1879–1939), Canadian librarian and suffragist
- Mary Hannay Foott (born Black, 1846–1918), Australian poet and editor

== See also ==
- Black (surname)
- Mari Black, American musician
- Mhairi Black (born 1994), Scottish National Party politician
