= Richard Black (disambiguation) =

Richard Black (Harry Richard Black, 1921–2014) was an American artist.

Richard Black or Dick Black may also refer to:

- Dick Black (politician) (Richard Hayden Black, born 1944), American politician
- Dicky Black, jockey in the 1950 Grand National
- Richard Horatio Black (1839–1911), American politician and official
- Dick Black (footballer) (Arthur Richard Black, 1907–?), Scottish footballer

== See also ==
- Rick Black (born 1943), Canadian football player
- Rich Blak, American hip-hop musician
