= Açai bowl =

Brazilian dessert made from açaí palm fruit

Açaí na tigela
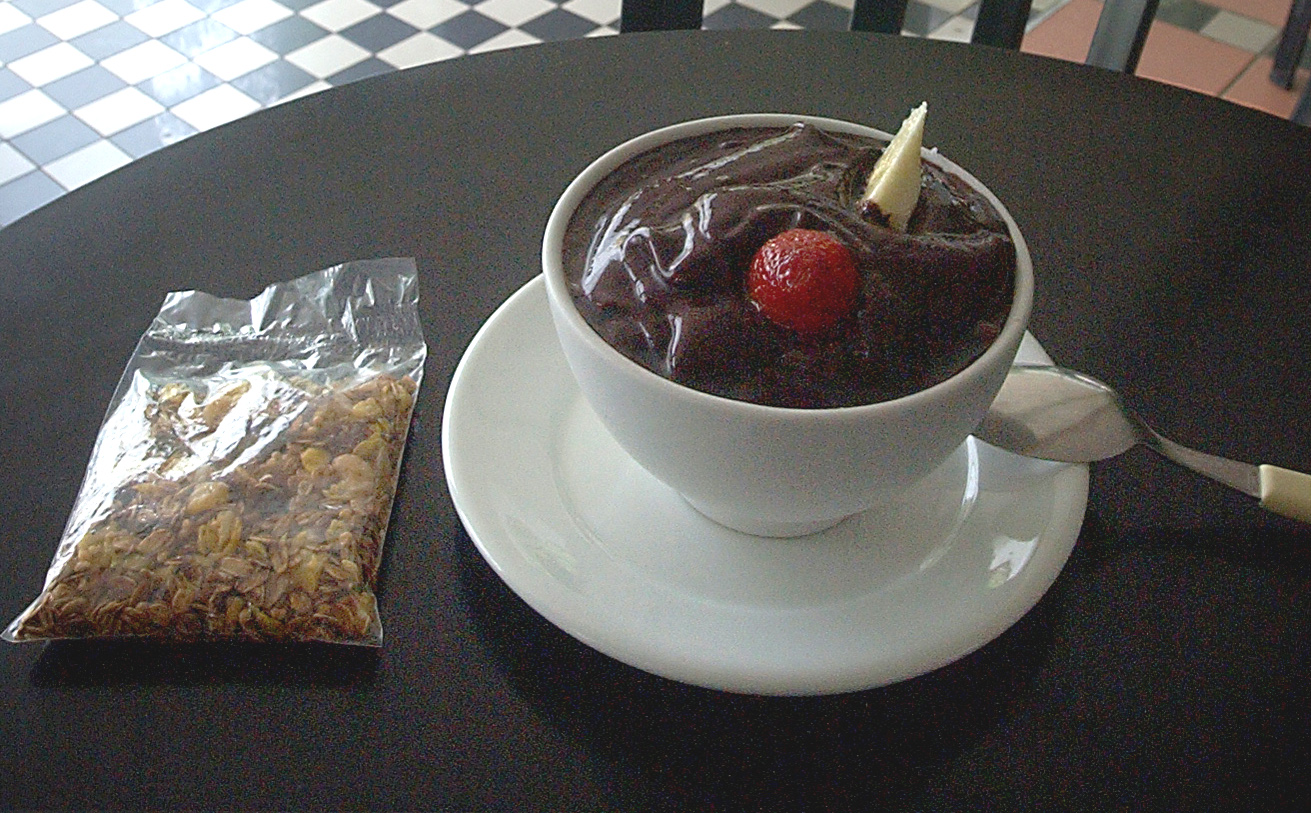
- Type: Dessert, Smoothie
- Place of origin: Brazil
- Region or state: Pará and in some parts of North Brazil; nowadays widespread through the country and internationally
- Serving temperature: Cold
- Main ingredients: Açaí palm fruit

An açai bowl (açaí na tigela, lit. 'Açaí in the bowl') is a sweet Brazilian snack food from Pará and Amazonas. It is a dish made with the frozen and mashed fruit of the açaí palm, described as having an "earthy" or creamy taste. Its texture is granular before blending and it has a tartness from its acidity, creating a favorable taste. It is served as a smoothie in a bowl, sometimes mixed with guaraná syrup or other sweeteners, and is commonly topped with granola and banana.

== Regional preparations ==
Açai bowls in North America and Brazil are prepared differently. In North American cafes and retail stores, bowls have more ingredients and toppings, while the Brazilian version is simpler.

=== Brazil ===
In Brazil, açaí bowls are called açaí na tigela (Portuguese). The bowl is prepared with açaí puree and blended with a natural sweetener, traditional guaraná syrup. The açai is blended with water and the sweetener; sugar may be added due to the fruit's strong tart taste. The blended mixture is served in a bowl and commonly topped with sliced banana and granola.

Although açaí na tigela is commonly consumed throughout Brazil, it has become more regionalized mainly in Pará, Rio de Janeiro, Florianópolis, São Paulo, Goiás, and along the northeastern coast, where it is sold in kiosks lining the beach promenade and in juice bars in many cities.

Preparing açaí bowls begins with harvesting the berries in the Amazon. Açai comes from the Euterpe oleracea palm tree, which is native to the seasonally flooded Amazon. Local producers harvest the acai berries from the palm trees. The berries are sent to local and international stores for consumption.

=== Australia ===
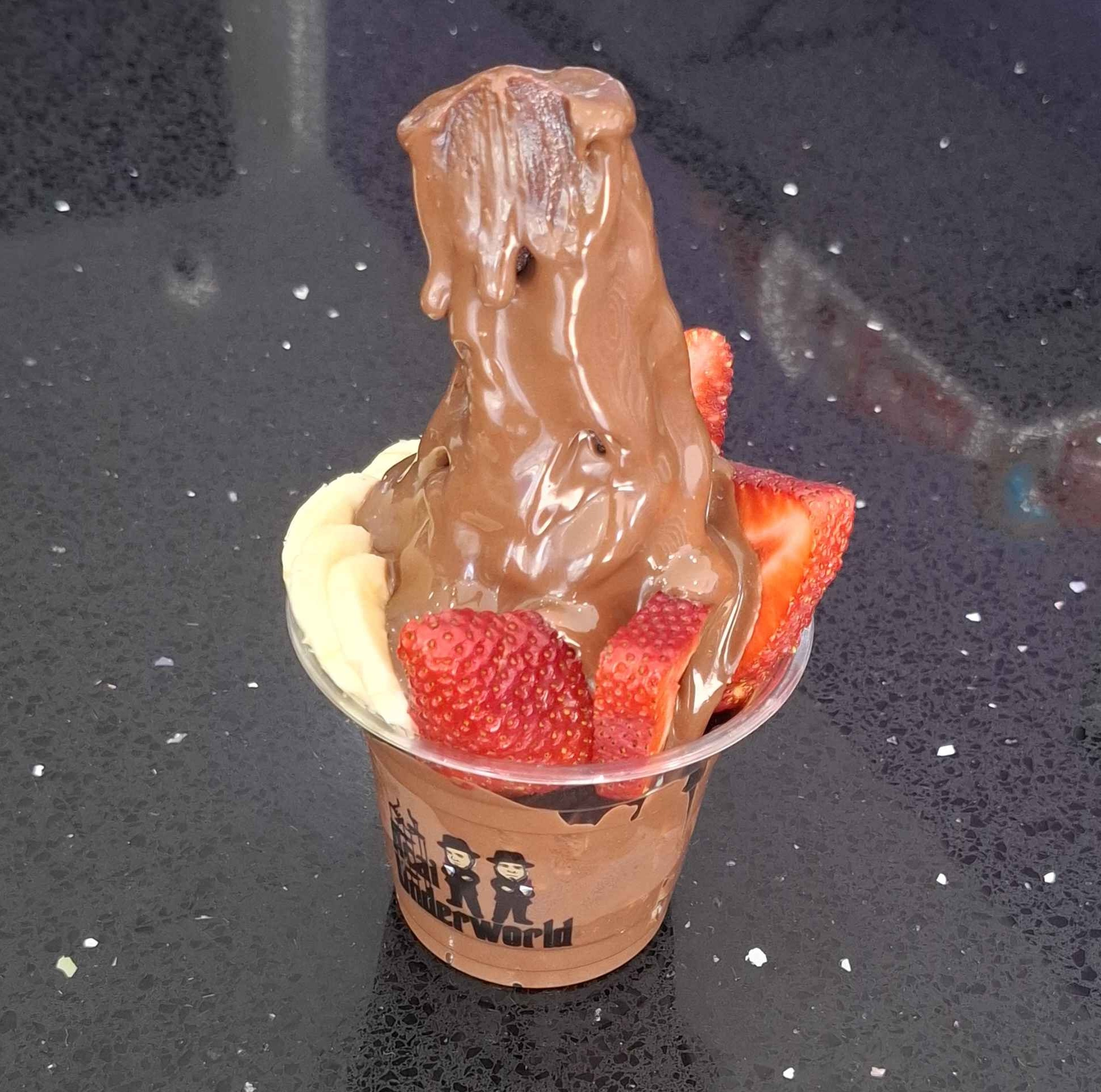
An Australian style açaí bowl with strawberries and Nutella sauce

In Australia during the 2010s, a local variety of açaí bowls became common in Sydney, particularly within the gym and fitness culture. Extending into the 2020s, açaí bowls are commonly consumed as street food, particularly among Lebanese-Australian communities, such as in Bankstown. The Australian açaí bowl is a thick, soft serve treat topped with fruit, granola, and sweet sauces, including Nutella or peanut butter. In Landsdowne, an açaí food truck known as Acai Underworld became known for its gang culture-affiliated branding and controversial owner, stimulating further mainstream interest for the Australian variety of açaí bowls, with the food truck eventually expanding into a store in St Marys.

=== North America ===
In North America, açai is often prepared with large frozen packs of açai puree. The puree can be sweetened or unsweetened. Açaí bowls are not purely açai; they also contain frozen strawberries, blueberries or mixed berries. Liquid is also added, any type of milk, juice or coconut water. Additional sweeteners, such as honey or maple syrup, may be added before the mixture is blended smooth. Common toppings are peanut butter, coconut shreds, fresh fruit, Nutella, chia and granola.

== International marketing ==
After a surge of scientific interest in the 1990s around the supposed health effects of açaí berries, starting around 2000, companies including Sambazon began importing açaí pulp to the United States and other countries. Initially consumed in Hawaii and Southern California, açaí bowls (as they are widely known outside Brazil) are available in many countries. Other variations, including açaí soft serve and similar desserts, have been developed.

By 2023, açaí exports from Brazil had risen over 16,000% over the prior decade, largely driven by aggressive marketing and increased consumption of açaí bowls. Açai and derivative exports from Brazil grew from 60 kg in 1999 to over 15,000 tonnes by 2021.

While marketing for açaí bowls purports health benefits, there is little clinical research to justify any health claims from consuming açaí bowls. While the berries are relatively low in sugar compared to other fruits, commercially available açaí bowls are often high in calories and added sugars, with sweeteners added to mask the natural bitter flavour of the berries.

== Gallery ==
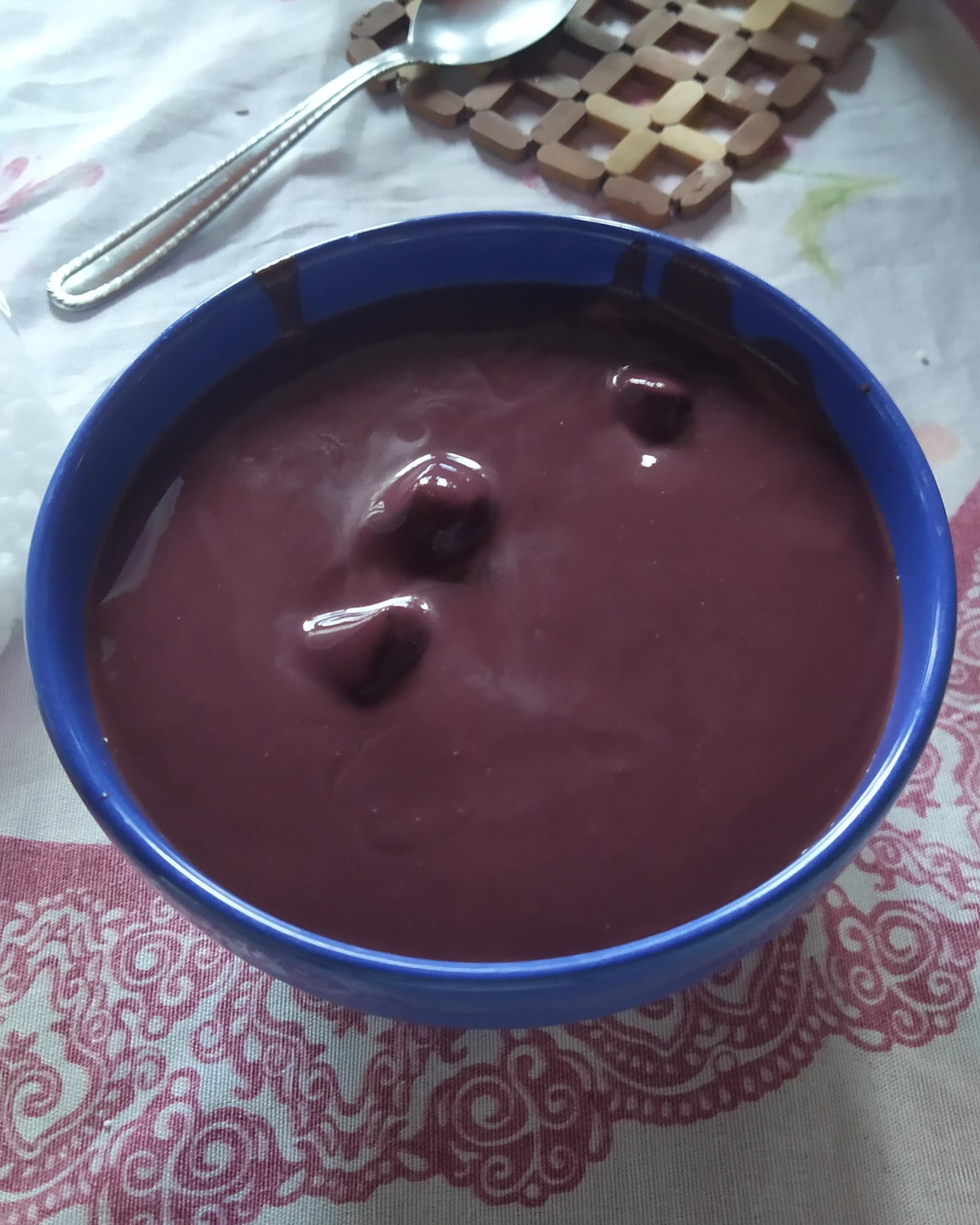
Açaí do Pará

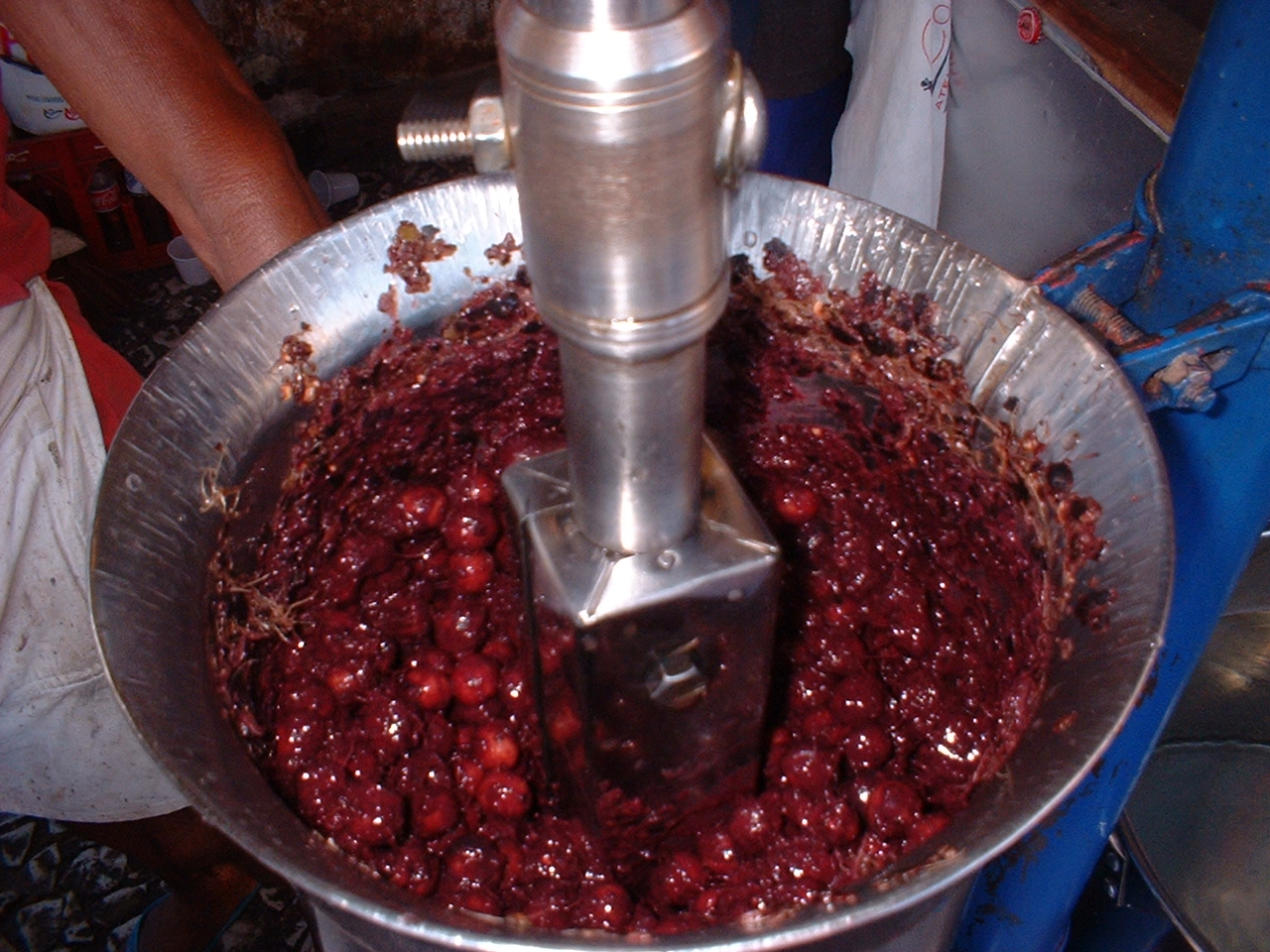
Mincing açaí berries into a pulp

== See also ==
- List of Brazilian dishes
- List of Brazilian sweets and desserts
- Feira do Açaí
