= Steven Black =

Steven or Stephen Black may refer to:

- Steven Black (businessman) (born 1953), American investment banker
- Steven Black (footballer) (born 1992), Scottish footballer
- Steven Black (gridiron football) (born 1986), American footballer
- Stephen Black (playwright) (1880–1931), South African playwright
- Don Black (white supremacist) (Stephen Donald Black, born 1953), American white nationalist
- Stephen Black (born 1980), Australian basketball player
- Steve Black (ice hockey) (1927–2008), Canadian ice hockey player
- Steve Black (politician) (born 1982), Canadian politician
- Sweet Baboo (Stephen Black, born 1982), Welsh musician
