= Thomas Black =

Thomas Black may refer to:

- Thomas Black (TV personality), Irish television personality
- Thomas Reuben Black (1832–1905), Canadian politician
- Thomas Black (minister) (c. 1670–1739), Church of Scotland minister, moderator of the General Assembly
- Tom Black (author) (born 1959), American entrepreneur and wine collector
- Tom Black (basketball) (1941–2017), American basketball player
- Tom Black (footballer) (born 1962), Scottish footballer
- Tom Black (speedway rider) (born 1941), motorcycle speedway rider from New Zealand
- Tom Black (cricketer) (born 1956), Scottish cricketer and educator
- Tom Campbell Black (1899–1936), English aviator
- Tommy Black (footballer, born 1979), English footballer who played for Arsenal and Crystal Palace
- Tommy Black (footballer, born 1906) (1906–1993), Scottish footballer who played for Arsenal and Plymouth Argyle
- Tommy Black (producer), record producer from Sweden
- Jack Black (Thomas Jacob Black, born 1969), American actor, comedian, singer, and musician
