= David Black =

David or Dave Black may refer to:

- Dave Black (baseball) (1892–1936), American baseball player
- Dave Black (drummer) (1928–2006), American jazz drummer
- Dave Black (composer) (born 1959), American author and composer
- Dave Black (runner) (born 1952), English long-distance runner
- David Black (Canadian football) (born 1962), Canadian football offensive lineman
- David Black (centre forward) British footballer with Port Vale
- David Black (footballer, born 1868) (1868–1940), Scottish international football (soccer) player
- David Black (historian) (1936–2024), Western Australian historian
- David Black (minister) (c.1565–1603) Scottish minister
- David Black (sculptor) (1928–2023), American sculptor
- David Black (writer) (born 1945), American writer
- David Alan Black (born 1952), professor of New Testament
- David Holmes Black (born 1946), Canadian newspaper publisher
- David Macleod Black (born 1941), South African-born Scottish poet
- David Black (photographer) (born 1980), American photographer and director
- Stage name of Jay Black (1938–2021), American singer
- David Black, 3rd Baronet (1929–2021), of the Black baronets

== See also ==
- Black (surname)
