= Judge Black =

Judge Black may refer to:

- Bruce D. Black (born 1947), judge of the United States District Court for the District of New Mexico
- Eugene Black (Texas politician) (1879–1975), judge of the United States Board of Tax Appeals
- Lloyd Llewellyn Black (1889–1950), judge of the United States District Courts for the Eastern and Western Districts of Washington
- Norman William Black (1931–1997), judge of the United States District Court for the Southern District of Texas
- Susan H. Black (born 1943), judge of the United States Court of Appeals for the Eleventh Circuit
- Timothy Black (born 1953), judge of the United States District Court for the Southern District of Ohio
- Walter Evan Black Jr. (1926–2014), judge of the United States District Court for the District of Maryland

== See also ==
- Justice Black (disambiguation)
