= Douglas Black =

Douglas Black may refer to:

- Sir Douglas Black (physician) (1913–2002), British physician
- Douglas Black (publisher) (1895–1977), American lawyer and publishing house executive
- Doug Black (born 1952), Canadian politician and lawyer
- Doug Black (travel promoter) (1884–1930), Canadian sportswriter and travel promoter
