= Donald Black =

Donald Black may refer to:

- Donald Black (sociologist) (1941–2024), American sociologist
- Donald Elmer Black (1892–1980), Canadian politician, farmer and merchant
- Donald Black (business executive), British businessman and accountant in Hong Kong
- Donald W. Black (born 1956), American psychiatrist

== See also ==
- Don Black (disambiguation)
