= Alan Black =

Alan Black may refer to:

- Alan Black (basketball), former basketball player and basketball coach in the Australian National Basketball League
- Alan Black (broadcaster) (1943–2007), British broadcaster and radio personality
- Alan Black (footballer) (1943–2026), Scottish association football player
- Alan Black (hunter), a big-game hunter for whom the term "white hunter" may have been coined
- Alan W. Black, professor of computer science at Carnegie Mellon University

== See also ==
- Alan the Black (died 1098), English lord of the Honour of Richmond
- Alan, 1st Earl of Richmond (before 1100–1146), or "Alan the Black", Breton noble
