= Eugene Black =

Eugene Black may refer to:

- Eugene Black (Texas politician) (1879–1975), American politician, former Congressman
- Eugene Robert Black (1873–1934), American attorney and businessman, former Federal Reserve Chairman
- Eugene R. Black Sr. (1898–1992), American banker, former president of the World Bank and son of Eugene Robert Black
- Eugene F. Black (1903–1990), American lawyer and judge, former Michigan Attorney General and former member of the Michigan Supreme Court
- Eugene H. Black III (born 1964), U. S. Navy officer
