= Sandra Black =

Canadian physician and neurologist

Sandra E. Black
- Born: Sault Ste. Marie, Ontario, Canada
- Education: University of Toronto; University of Oxford; Western University (Ontario)
- Occupations: Neurologist, Physician, Professor
- Employer(s): Sunnybrook Health Sciences Centre; University of Toronto
- Known for: Research on Alzheimer's disease, vascular dementia, and stroke
- Awards: Order of Canada; Order of Ontario; Fellow of the Royal Society of Canada

Sandra Elizabeth Black, OC OOnt FRSC is a Canadian physician and neurologist known for her work in "contributing to improved diagnosis and treatment of vascular dementia, Alzheimer's disease and stroke". She is currently a Senior scientist at Toronto's Sunnybrook Health Sciences Centre. She holds the Brill Chair in Neurology in the Department of Medicine at the University of Toronto.

== Early life and education ==
The daughter of Harriet (Peterson) Black, CM, co-founder of the Algoma Fall Festival, and Thomas Black, an obstetrician and gynecologist, Black was raised in Sault Ste. Marie, Ontario. Black received a Bachelor of Science degree in biological and medical sciences in 1969 from the University of Toronto. She received a Master of Arts degree in history and philosophy of science from Oxford University in 1970. She received her Medical Doctorate (MD) in 1978 from University of Toronto and a Fellowship in cognitive neurology in 1984 from the University of Western Ontario.

Black attended the University of Toronto where she received her Bachelor of Science (Hons) in 1969 and her Doctor of Medicine (MD) in 1978. Black also studied at Oxford University where she received a diploma in the History and Philosophy of Science and at Western University where she was a Fellow in Cognitive Neurology.

== Awards and honours ==
- Fellow of the Royal Society of Canada, 2012
- Active member of the Order of Ontario
- Officer of the Order of Canada.
- Outstanding researcher of the year award, department of medicine, University of Toronto, 2013
- Elected to Royal Society of Canada, 2012
- Irma M. Parhad Award for Excellence, Consortium of Canadian Centres for Clinical Cognitive Research, 2011
