= Matt Black =

Matt Black may refer to:

- Matt Black (DJ) (born 1961), British DJ and one half of music duo Coldcut
- Matt Black (Canadian football) (born 1985), Canadian football defensive back
- Matt Black (photographer) (born 1970), American documentary photographer

== See also ==
- Matthew Black (1908–1994), Scottish minister and biblical scholar
