= Jordan Black =

Jordan Black may refer to:

- Jordan Black (actor) (born 1970), American comedy writer and actor
- Jordan Black (American football) (born 1980), American football offensive tackle
- Jordan Black (Millennium), a fictional character in Millennium
