= Andrew Black =

Andrew Black may refer to:

- Andy Black (footballer) (1917–1989), Scottish international footballer
- Andy Black (poker player) (born 1965), Northern Irish poker professional
- Andrew Black (gambling entrepreneur) (born 1963), creator of Betfair
- Andrew Black (director) (born 1974), Scottish film director
- Andy Biersack (born 1990), musician with the alias Andy Black
- Andrew Black (footballer, born 1995), Scottish footballer
- Andrew Black (baritone) (1859–1920), Scottish baritone
- Andrew Black (rower) (born 1971), Australian rower
