= Diboué Black =

Cameroonian musician

- Also known as: Le LIMA (Le Lion Indomptable de la Musique Africaine), Mevio
- Born: Ebenezer Diboué Mpondo Black; July 16, 1967 (age 58); Akwa, Douala, Cameroon
- Origin: Cameroon
- Genres: makossa, zouk
- Occupations: Singer; songwriter; composer; musical producer
- Years active: 1980s–present
- Labels: Sonodisc; Socadisc; Wagram Music; Melodie

Ebenezer Diboué Black is a singer, composer and musical producer from Cameroon. He is also a songwriter, and performs his songs in French and Duala. His repertoire is mainly makossa and zouk. He is considered the pioneer of the "Makossa-Consciousness" style, whose name has probably been derived from the title of his latest album entitled Positive Consciousness (released in 2003).

== Biography ==
Ebenezer Diboué Mpondo Black was born on 16 July 1967 in Douala, Cameroon, in the residential area of Akwa. At the age of ten, he was nicknamed Mevio after the companion of the singer James Brown because he knew Brown's repertoire by heart.

In 1980–1982, he performed with various amateur bands and his talent was noticed by fellow musicians. In 1983, he composed his first romantic song: Mbodji (a flower in Duala).

In 1984, he arrived in France to continue his studies and his musical career. His first album, It's not serious, was released in 1988, and was rather short (comprised five songs). It was far from being a commercial success. Diboué kept working and writing songs. His next album appeared in 1989, it was titled The Roses of Life, and was released by Sonodisc. His third album, Wake-up Africa, was released by Socadisc after a long interval in 1996. This album is a mixture of genres, ranging from zouk to blues. His fourth album, Africa fiesta, was released by Wagram Music. One of the songs from that album, Jump Africa, became a hit.

His latest album, Positive Consciousness, was released by Melodie in 2003. In recent years, he became a musical producer, helping aspiring African musicians to get their songs recorded. He is also known as Le LIMA (Le Lion Indomptable de la Musique Africaine, i.e. Indomitable Lion of African music).

== Discography ==
- 1988 : It's not Serious (Volume)
- 1989 : The Roses of Life (Sonodisc)
- 1996 : Wake up Africa (Socadisc)
- 2000 : Africa Fiesta (Wagram Music)
- 2003 : Positive Consciousness (Melodie)

=== Compilations ===
- 1995 : Cameroon Connection (Sonodisc-TJR)
- 1996 : Afric Panache (Sonodisc-TJR)
- 1998 : Tropical Fever (Wagram Music / Epssy Record)
- 1999 : African Dance Beat Volume I (Bell Hammer Musik / Germany)
- 2000 : My Evening Zouk (Universal Music)
- 2000 : Mega Africa (Wagram Music)
- 2002 – 2003 : Africa All Stars Volume I and II (EMI-Virgin)
- 2004: Tropical Heat (Sony BMG)
- 2007: African Dance Beat Volume II (Hammer Musik-Germany)

=== DVD ===
- 2003 : Colors of Africa (Atoll Music)
- 2003 : Africa World Music (Music-Go)
