= Gary Black =

Gary Black may refer to:

- Gary Black (cricketer) (born 1954), English cricketer
- Gary Black (politician) (born 1958), American politician
