= Harry Black =

Harry Black may refer to:

- Harry Black (UNICEF) (1934–2017), Canadian humanitarian
- Harry Black (politician) (born 1947), Australian politician
- Harry Black (city manager) (born 1963), city manager of Cincinnati, Ohio
- Harry Crawford Black (1887–1956), American businessperson, newspaper executive and philanthropist
- Harry Black (novel), a 1956 novel by David Walker
- Harry Black (film), a 1958 British film adaptation of the novel
- Harry Black (River City), fictional character in Scottish soap opera River City
- Harry S. Black, son-in-law of George A. Fuller, who took over Fuller's company after he died
- Harry A. Black (1879–1923), Vermont attorney and public official

== See also ==
- Henry Black (disambiguation)
- Harold Stephen Black (1898–1983), American electrical engineer
