= Laura Black =

Laura Black may refer to:

- Laura Black, pseudonym of British novelist Roger Longrigg (1929–2000)
- Laura Black, victim in Sunnyvale ESL shooting in 1988
