= Roy Black =

Roy Black may refer to:

- Roy Black (attorney) (1945–2025), American criminal defense attorney and law professor
- Roy Black (singer) (1943–1991), German singer and actor
- Roy Turnbull Black (1888–1962), American chess player
- Roy Keith Black (1927–2009), British-born businessman in Ireland
