= Alexander Black =

Alexander Black may refer to:

- Alexander Black (theologian) (1789–1864), theologian and Free Church of Scotland minister
- Alexander Black (architect) (1790–1858), Scottish architect based in Edinburgh
- Alexander Black (surveyor) (1827–1897), Scottish-born surveyor in Victoria, Australia
- Alexander Black (Canadian politician) (1832–1913), political figure in Manitoba
- Alexander Black (photographer) (1859–1940), American author and inventor of the pre-cinema “Picture Play”
- Alexander William Black (1859–1906), Liberal Party politician in Scotland
- Alexander Black (footballer), Scottish forward with FC Barcelona 1900–1901
- Alexander Black (actor) (Omar Elba, born 1983), American film actor
