= Tony Black (writer) =

Scottish writer

Tony Black is a Scottish writer. Much of his work is in the tartan noir crime genre, featuring Gus Dury, Rob Brennan and Doug Michie. He has more recently pursued projects in other literary directions. Irvine Welsh has called Black his "favourite British crime writer".

He was born in Australia to Scottish parents, and raised in Scotland and Ireland.

== Bibliography ==
- Gutted
- Truth Lies Bleeding
- Artefacts of the Dead
- The Storm Without
- Paying for It
- Murder Mile
- The Inglorious Dead
- The Last Tiger
- His Father's Son
- The Ringer
- Loss
- Long Time Dead
- Ten Bells at Robbie's
- Last Orders
- RIP Robbie Silva
- The Holy Father
- London Calling
- Hard Truths (contributor)
- The Sin Bin
- The Lost Generation
- Killing Time in Vegas
