= Charles Black =

Charles Black may refer to:

- Charles A. Black (1837–1901), Canadian physician and politician
- Charles Alden Black (1919–2005), U.S. Navy officer and businessman
- Charles Allen Black (1916–2002), American agronomist
- Charles B. Black (1921–1992), American professional basketball player in the mid-1940s
- Charles C. Black (1858–1947), American jurist and Democratic politician
- Charles H. Black (1850–1918), American automobile pioneer
- Charles Black (counterfeiter) (1928–2012)
- Charles L. Black, Jr. (1915–2001),American legal scholar
- Charles R. Black Jr. (born 1947), lobbyist and adviser to Ronald Reagan and John McCain
- Charlie T. Black (1901–1988), American college basketball player in the mid-1920s
- Charlie Black (1949–2021), American songwriter
