= Francis Black =

Francis Black may refer to:

- Francis Black (politician) (1870–1941), politician in Manitoba, Canada
- Francis Marion Black (1836–1902), justice of the Missouri Supreme Court

== See also ==
- Black Francis (born 1965), American singer, songwriter and guitarist
- Frank Black (disambiguation)
- Frances Black (born 1960), Irish singer
