= Lawrence Black (historian) =

British academic

Lawrence Black FRHistS is an academic historian specialising in the political culture of twentieth-century Britain. Since 2012, he has been Professor of Modern British History at the University of York.

== Career ==
Black graduated from the University of Exeter in 1993 with a first-class Bachelor of Arts degree in history, before completing a Master of Arts degree in comparative social and labour history at University of Warwick the following year. He was a doctoral student at London Guildhall University from 1995 to 1999, when it awarded him a PhD for his thesis "The political culture of the left in 'affluent' Britain, 1951–1964". From 1996 to 2000, Black temporarily lectured at Kingston, Middlesex and Westminster universities, and at King's College London; he then spent two years as a post-doctoral fellow at the University of Bristol, before spending a year at Westminster College as Fulbright-Robertson Professor of British History. After another year at Bristol as a lecturer, Black was appointed a lecturer at Durham University in 2004; promotions followed to a senior lectureship in 2008 and a readership in 2011. In 2012, he moved to the University of York to be Professor of Modern British History. In 2004, he was elected a Fellow of the Royal Historical Society.

Black's research focuses on the political culture of later twentieth-century Britain, including the relationships between political parties, social movements and wider sociocultural change in the post-war decades. This has also encompassed studies of post-materialist politics in wider British politics, incorporating youth, consumer and media politics.

== Publications ==
- (Editor) Consensus or Coercion?: The State, the People and Social Cohesion in Postwar Britain (New Clarion Press, 2001).
- The Political Culture of the Left in Affluent Britain, 1951–64: Old Labour, New Britain? (Palgrave Macmillan, 2003).
- (Co-editor with Hugh Pemberton) An Affluent Society?: Britain's Post-War "Golden Age" Revisited (Ashgate, 2004).
- (Co-editor with Nicole Robertson) Taking Stock: Consumerism and the Co-operative Movement in Modern British History (Manchester University Press, 2009).
- (Co-editor with Hugh Pemberton and Pat Thane) Reassessing 1970s Britain (Manchester University Press, 2013).
