= Richard Horatio Black =

American politician

Member of the Florida House of Representatives from the Alachua County district
- In office 1869–1870

Personal details
- Born: February 11, 1839
- Died: May 13, 1911 (aged 72)

Richard Horatio Black (February 11, 1839 - May 13, 1911) was a soldier, teacher, Volusia County registrar, justice of the peace, member of the Florida House of Representatives and held a custom house position in Philadelphia. He was a member of the state house representing Alachua County, Florida in 1869 and 1870,

In August 1868 he was made an Inspector of Elections. From 1868 to 1869 he served as a justice of the peace.

In his 1888 book Carpetbag Rule in Florida, former Leon County, Florida legislator John Wallace or presumed author William D. Bloxham described him as educated in an otherwise derisive and derogatory account of African Americans, Republicans, and the Reconstruction era.

== See also ==
- African American officeholders from the end of the Civil War until before 1900
