= Amanda Black (epidemiologist) =

Northern Irish epidemiologist

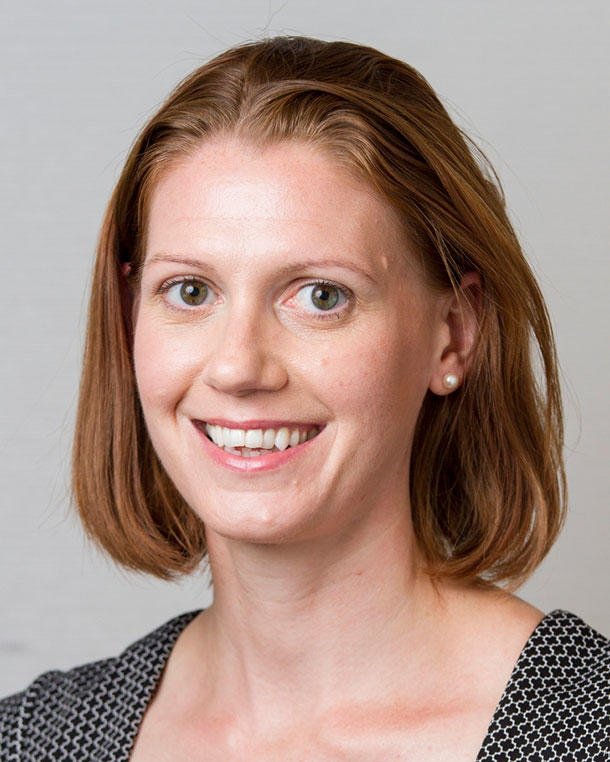
- Education: Queen's University Belfast; University of Manchester
- Scientific career
- Fields: Cancer epidemiology
- Workplaces: National Cancer Institute

Amanda Black is a Northern Irish epidemiologist who is the associate director of biological resources in the National Cancer Institute's division of cancer epidemiology and genetics. Black has been awarded a Federally Funded Research and Development Center (FFRDC) Bridge Award and a Distinguished Service Award.

== Life ==
Black received an undergraduate degree in biomedical science (2001), Master of Medical Laboratory Science (2002), and Ph.D. in epidemiology and public health (2005) from Queen's University Belfast's faculty of medicine and health sciences. Her dissertation was titled Secular trends in the physical health and psychological well-being of students attending Queen's University Belfast. Her dissertation was supervised by Peter McCarron, Liam Murray, and Michael Donnelly of the department of epidemiology and public health. In 2006, Black was selected for a National Cancer Institute (NCI) cancer prevention fellowship. During her fellowship, Black was awarded a Master of Public Health (2008) by the University of Manchester. Black's fellowship was in the NCI early detection research group, where she worked on the prostate, lung, colorectal and ovarian cancer screening trial (PLCO).

In 2009, Black joined division of cancer epidemiology and genetics (DCEG) as a staff scientist. She is associate director of biological resources. In the NCI office of the director, Black oversees management of the biological specimen resources of the DCEG and supports the planning of new prospective multi-center cohort studies. She is a member of the PLCO leadership team.

In 2019 Black received a Federally Funded Research and Development Center (FFRDC) Bridge Award in “recognition of her efforts to renew the contract ensuring continued operations of the NCI's FFRDC/Frederick National Lab for Cancer Research”. In May 2020 she received a Distinguished Service Award, “for her organizational and scientific leadership in managing the DCEG biospecimen resources management tool—Biospecimen Inventory (BSI), which stores highly critical information on 12 million biospecimens”.
