= Aaron Black =

Aaron Black(e) may refer to:

- Aaron Black (basketball) (born 1996), Filipino-American basketball player
- Aaron Black (footballer, born 1990), Australian rules footballer for Geelong, North Melbourne and Peel
- Aaron Black (footballer, born 1992), Australian rules footballer for West Perth
- Aaron Black (Irish footballer) (born 1983), Association footballer from Northern Ireland
- Aaron Black, singer with Capitol Offense (band)
- Aaron Black (golfer) in Carolinas Open
- Aaron Blacke, unofficial Mayor of Invercargill
