= Catherine Black =

Catherine or Kate Black may refer to:

- Catherine Black (Millennium), a character on the television series Millennium
- Catherine Black (actress), Canadian film, television and stage actress
- Catherine Black (nurse) (1878–1949), Irish nurse
- Kate Black (model), English model and beauty pageant titleholder
- Katie Zacharia (née Kate Sharon Black, born 1984), White House press secretary

== See also ==
- Cathie Black (Cathleen Prunty Black, born 1944), educator, and president and publisher of USA Today
