= John Black (New Brunswick politician) =

Canadian politician

MLA for York County
- In office 1895 to 1899

Personal details
- Born: November 23, 1853 Kingclear, New Brunswick
- Died: December 29, 1936 (aged 83) Fredericton, New Brunswick
- Party: Liberal Party of New Brunswick

John Black (November 23, 1853 – December 29, 1936) was a lawyer and political figure in New Brunswick, Canada. He represented York County in the Legislative Assembly of New Brunswick from 1895 to 1899 as a Liberal member.

He was born in Kingsclear, New Brunswick, the son of the Reverend John Black and Sarah, the sister of judge Edward Ludlow Wetmore. Black was educated at Fredericton. He studied law and was called to the bar in 1876. Black married a Miss Robb. He served two years on the Fredericton City Council as a councillor and was auditor and secretary-treasurer for York County. He died December 29, 1936, in Fredericton, New Brunswick.
