= Michael Black =

Michael or Mike Black may refer to:

== Sports ==
- Michael Black (footballer) (born 1976), former English footballer
- Mike Black (offensive lineman) (born 1964), American football player
- Mike Black (kicker) (born 1969), American football player
- Mike Black (punter) (born 1961), American football player

== Arts and entertainment ==
- Michael Ian Schwartz (known as Michael Ian Black; born 1971), American comedian, actor, and writer
- Michael Black (literary critic) (1928–2022), British literary critic and writer
- Michael Black (sculptor) (1928–2019), British sculptor

== Other ==
- Michael Black (judge) (born 1940), former Chief Justice of the Federal Court of Australia
- Michael J. Black (born 1962), American-born computer scientist
