= Chris Black =

Chris Black may refer to:

- Chris Black (hammer thrower) (born 1950), Scottish hammer thrower
- Chris Black (screenwriter), American television screenwriter and producer
- Chris Black (footballer) (born 1982), English football (soccer) player
- Chris Black (rugby union) (born 1978), Scottish rugby union player
- Chris Black (River City), fictional character
