= Norm Black =

Australian rules footballer

Personal information
- Full name: Norman Francis Black
- Born: 5 November 1927
- Died: 13 September 2011 (aged 83)
- Original team: Kew
- Height: 175 cm (5 ft 9 in)
- Weight: 72 kg (159 lb)
- Position: Back Pocket

Playing career^{1}
Years	Club	Games (Goals)
1949–53	Hawthorn	55 (0)
- ^{1} Playing statistics correct to the end of 1953.

Norman Francis Black (5 November 1927 – 13 September 2011) was an Australian rules footballer who played with Hawthorn in the Victorian Football League (VFL).
