= Sambazon =

American food and beverage producer

Sambazon, Inc.
- Industry: Food products, Drinks
- Founded: 2000; 26 years ago
- Products: Acai pulp; acai juice
- Website: http://sambazon.com

Sambazon, Inc. is a privately held American company based in San Clemente, California and founded in 2000. The company makes and sells açaí-based food and beverages. Its açaì-based smoothies, juices, and other Sambazon smoothies are sold in packages.

== History ==
Sambazon was founded in 2000 by Ryan Black, Edmund Nichols and Jeremy Black, following a trip to Brazil where they experienced their first açaí bowls. Credited for introducing açaí to the US, the company started by selling frozen açaí pulp to juice bars in southern California, but now has distribution networks across the US, Japan, Korea, Taiwan, Mexico and Canada. In 2005, Sambazon built its own açaí manufacturing plant in Brazil, establishing an organic, vertically-integrated supply chain for the berries.

== Litigation ==
The Brazil Federal Public Ministry (MPF) in Amapá accused Sambazon and its CEO in 2018 for exploiting the genetic heritage of açaí without the authorization of the Management and Genetic Heritage Council (Cgen). Judicially, the MPF issued a fine of more than R $ 70 million in compensation for material damages to the environment and collective moral damages. The MPF also ordered the company to stop using Brazilian açaí in its products until it obtained regular registration with Cgen.

== Sustainability ==
Sambazon operates as a triple bottom line business (whereby success is measured economically, socially and environmentally), and has worked closely with local and international NGOs, including The Nature Conservancy, World Wildlife Fund, Peabiru Institute, Amapa and Para State Federal Universities and more, to preserve the Amazon rainforest, ensure that their açaí berries are sustainably harvested, and that farmers are paid fair wages.

Sambazon also founded the Sustainable Amazon Partnership (SAP) “to promote lasting sustainable management of the Brazilian Amazon, while improving the conditions of indigenous people through creative marketing of the açaí fruit,” and works to encourage environmental stewardship, stimulate biodiverse agro-forestry systems, and provide alternatives to logging, cattle, soy, and monoculture plantations through the project.

== Awards ==
Sambazon is the recipient of several awards, including SELF 2013 Healthy Food Awards; Women’s Health 125 Best Packaged Food Awards 2012; BevNET Best of 2012 Award: Best Smoothie; InterBev: Best Organic Beverage Award 2012; SHAPE Snack Awards 2011; and the United States Secretary of State’s 2006 Award for Corporate Excellence (ACE) – Small-Medium Business Category.
