= Hugh Black =

Hugh Black may refer to:

- Hugh Black (theologian) (1868–1953), Scottish-American theologian and author
- Hugh David Black (1903–1942), American naval officer

== See also ==
- Hugh the Black (died 952), Duke of Burgundy
