= Justice Black =

Justice Black may refer to:

- Hugo Lafayette Black (1886–1971), associate justice of the United States Supreme Court from 1937 to 1971
- Charles C. Black (1858–1947), associate justice of the New Jersey Supreme Court
- Eugene F. Black (1903–1990), associate justice of the Michigan Supreme Court
- Francis Marion Black (1836–1902), associate justice of the Supreme Court of Missouri
- Jeremiah S. Black (1810–1883), chief justice of the Supreme Court of Pennsylvania from 1851 to 1854
- Jill Black, Lady Black of Derwent (born 1954), justice of the Supreme Court of the United Kingdom
- John Black (Mississippi politician) (1800–1854), associate justice of the Mississippi Supreme Court

== See also ==
- Judge Black (disambiguation)
