= Peter Black =

Peter Black may refer to:

- Peter Black (Australian politician) (born 1943), member of the New South Wales Legislative Assembly
- Peter Black (Welsh politician) (born 1960), member of the Welsh Assembly
- Peter Black (musician), recording artist on Hidden Beach Records
