= Tom Black (author) =

American entrepreneur and wine collector

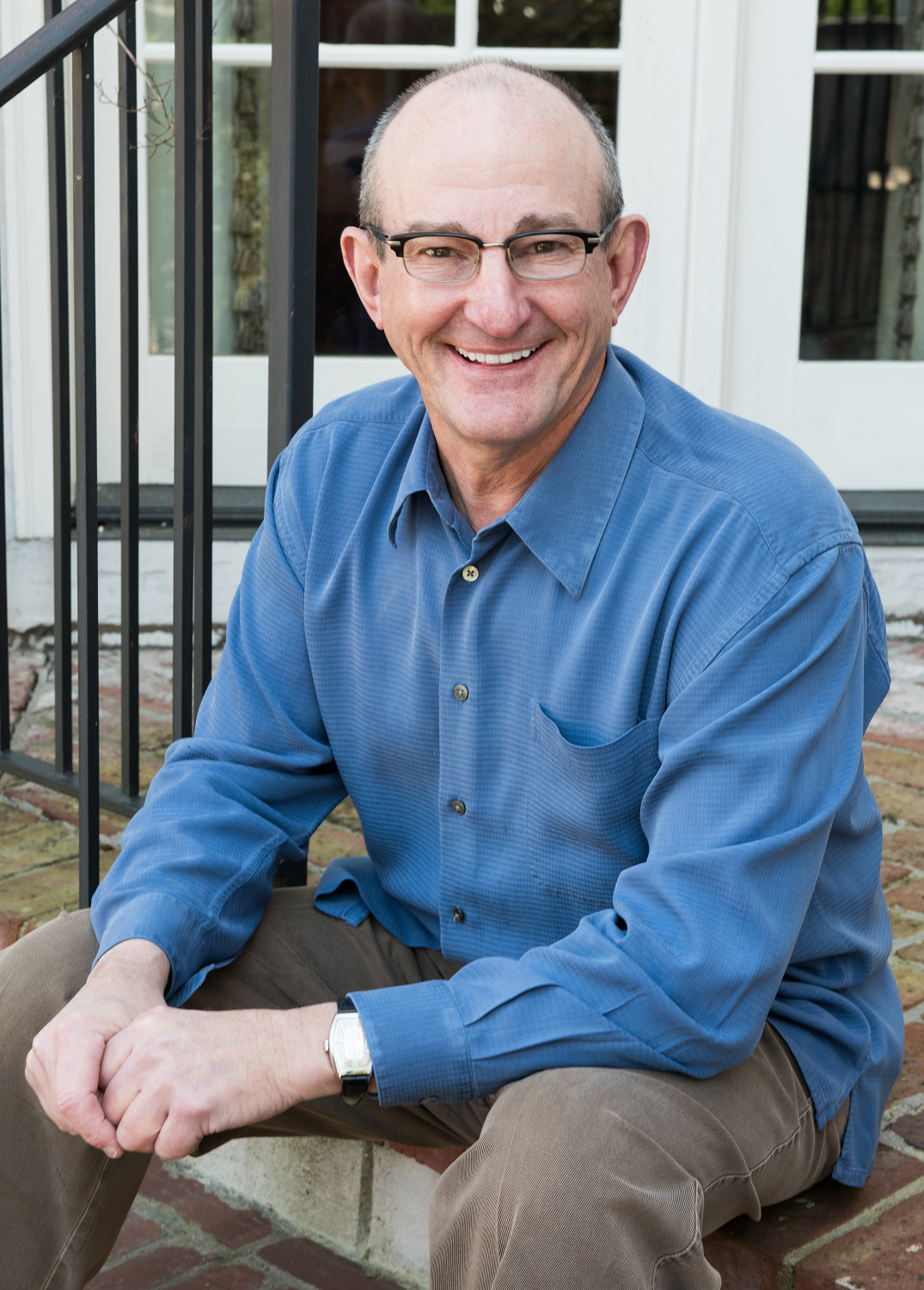
Tom Black in 2017

Tom Black (born 1959) is an American entrepreneur and wine collector.

== Early life ==
Black was born in Nickerson, Kansas in 1959 in a converted train boxcar. Black attended Southwest Missouri State Teachers College where he sold books door-to-door during summer breaks for booksellers Southwestern Company of Nashville, Tennessee.

== Business ventures and writing ==
Black became sales manager of Southwestern Company of Nashville, Tennessee, then National Sales Manager for FISI In 1990, Black founded and was the CEO of accounts receivable company, Private Business, Inc. The company went public in 1999. That same year, Black co-founded bank mission-critical equipment and maintenance company, Tecniflex, then its sister company, Imagic Corporation.

In 2007, Black published an autobiography, The Boxcar Millionaire, which describes his impoverished childhood and his subsequent business success. In 2020, Black published "Doing Business at the Table: The Guide to Presenting an Exemplary Professional and Social Presence While Hosting a Successful Business Lunch Or Dinner Meeting" through the Tom Black Center for Excellence. Black has written columns for The Tennessean newspaper.

Black is also a motivational speaker, giving seminars on ethical sales techniques. In 2008, Black partnered with Chicken Soup for the Soul author, Mark Victor Hansen, to give a series of one-day seminars on sales.

== Wine ==
Black is a wine collector, with a wine cellar containing more than 30,000 bottles, one of the largest personal collections in the United States.
