= Carol Black =

Carol Black may refer to:

- Carol Black (rheumatologist) (born 1939), British physician and academic
- Carol Black (writer) (born c. 1957), American writer and filmmaker
