= Nick Black =

British physician and health services researcher

Sir Nick Black FRCPE FRCS
- Born: Nicholas Andrew Black; 1951 (age 74–75); UK
- Education: University of Birmingham
- Occupation: Health services researcher
- Employer: GoodUnited
- Website: www.lshtm.ac.uk/aboutus/people/black.nick

Sir Nicholas Andrew Black FRCPE FRCS (born 1951) is a British physician and health services researcher.

Black studied medicine at the University of Birmingham, graduating in 1974, worked for Save the Children Fund (UK) in Nepal for 18 months before undertaking a doctorate and training in public health at Oxford from 1978 to 1982. He was then a lecturer at the Open University for three years, writing a distance-learning course 'Health and Disease' with biologists, sociologists and economists.

In 1985, he obtained a position at the London School of Hygiene and Tropical Medicine, becoming chair in health services research there in 1995. He established and co-edited the Journal of Health Services Research and Policy from 1996 until 2017.

He published in 2006 Walking London's Medical History, a book of seven walks through London telling the story of how health services and health care policy developed. Since 2016 he has created two GPS guided walks on VoiceMap.

He was made a Knight Bachelor in the 2017 New Year Honours for his services to healthcare research. He is also an Honorary Fellow of the Royal College of Physicians, Edinburgh (FRCP Edin) and Honorary Fellow of the Royal College of Surgeons, England (FRCS Engl).
