= Tyler Black =

Tyler Black may refer to:

- Tyler Black (baseball) (born 2000), a Canadian professional baseball infielder
- Tyler Black (wrestler) (born 1986), an American professional wrestler best known as Seth Rollins
