= Sarah Hearst Black =

American social reformer

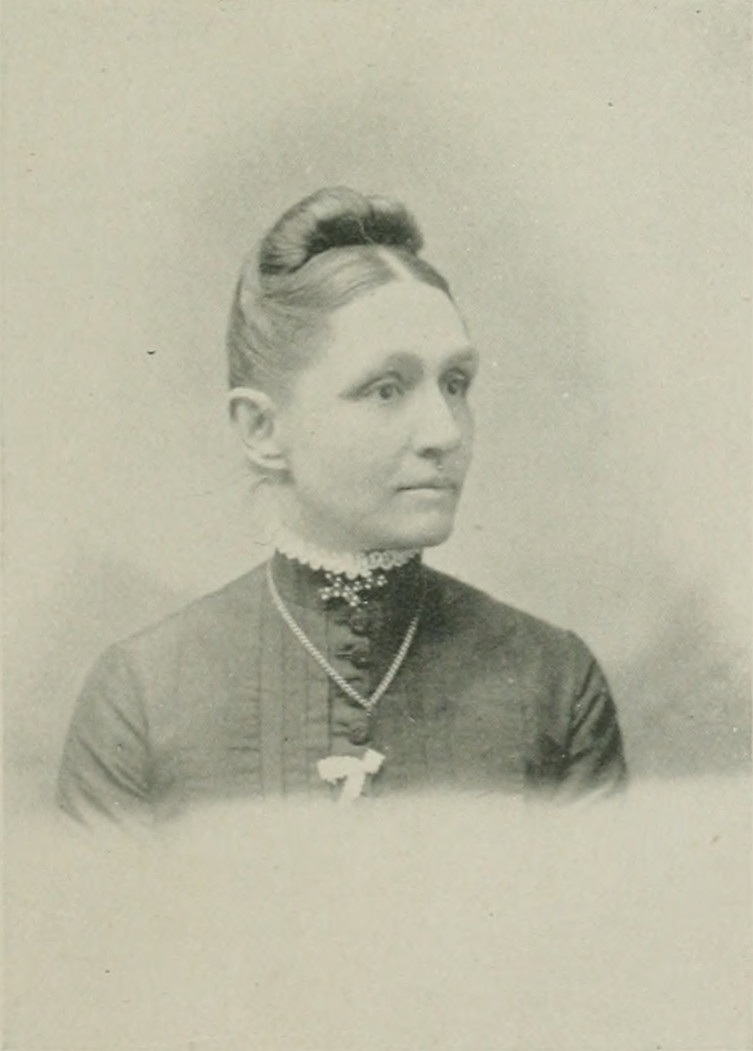
- Photo portrait from A Woman of the Century
- Born: May 4, 1846 near Savannah, Ohio
- Died: June 9, 1894 (aged 48); California
- Occupation: Teacher
- Known for: Social reformer, president of the WCTU
- Spouse: Rev. J. P. Black (m. 1878)

Sarah Hearst Black (May 4, 1846 – June 9, 1894) was an American social reformer in the temperance movement. She lived a life of self-denial as a home missionary's wife in Kansas, Nebraska, and Idaho, and served as president of the Woman's Christian Temperance Union (WCTU) in Nebraska.

== Early years ==
Sarah Hearst was born on a farm near Savannah, Ohio, May 4, 1846. Her father's family removed from Pennsylvania to that farm when he was 14 years of age, and Black grew up there. Her ancestors were Scotch-Irish people, all of them members of the Presbyterian Church. Her mother's maiden name was Townsley. Black first attended school in a typical red school-house situated on a corner of her father's farm. At 13 years of age, she began to attend school in Savannah Academy, where she completed a regular course of study. She made a public profession of religion in her 15 year and soon after became a teacher in the Sunday school.

== Career ==
After completing her course of study, she became a teacher, and that was her employment for more than 10 years. In 1878, she married Rev. J. P. Black, a minister of the Presbyterian Church, and went with him to his field of labor in Pennsylvania. They removed to Kansas in 1880, and since thereafter, she worked as a home missionary's wife in Kansas, Nebraska, and Idaho. She became actively engaged in WCTU work in 1885, in Nebraska, and was elected president of the fifth district of that State for two years in succession. After her removal to Idaho, she was chosen president of the WCTU in that State. She made her home in Nampa, Idaho.

== Death ==
She died on June 9, 1894, aged 48, in California.
