= Ann Spence Black =

Scottish artist (1860-1947)

- Born: 22 May 1860; Dysart, Scotland
- Died: 22 February 1947 (aged 86); Edinburgh, Scotland

Ann Spence Black (22 May 1860 - 22 February 1947) was a Scottish artist known for her landscape and flower paintings.

== Biography ==
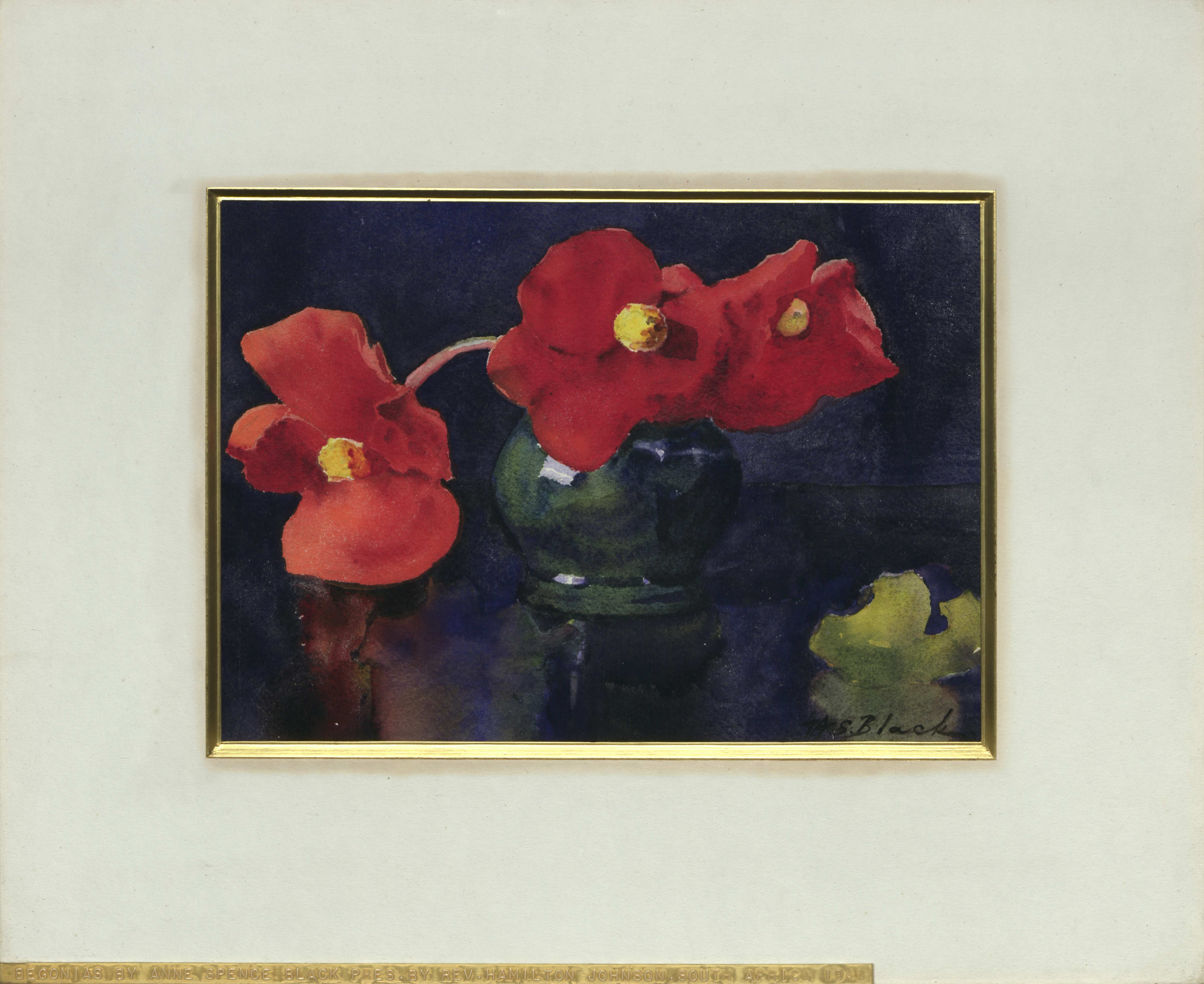
Begonias, Aberdeen Archives, Gallery & Museums Collection

Black was born at Dysart in Fife and appears to have been a self-taught artist. Although she lived in Edinburgh for most of her life, there were several other locations in Scotland that she regularly depicted in her paintings. These included the Scottish east coast and the area around Culross. Black was a prolific painter and as well as landscapes also produced richly coloured flower pieces. She was a regular exhibitor with the Royal Scottish Academy between 1896 and 1946. During her career she had some 95 works shown at the Royal Scottish Watercolour Society, RSW, and almost 40 with the Royal Glasgow Institute of the Fine Arts. Black was elected to the RSW in 1917 and to the Society of Scottish Artists in 1940. Works by Black are held in the City of Edinburgh collection, by Kirkcaldy Galleries, by The McManus in Dundee and by the University of St Andrews.
