= Don Black =

Don Black may refer to:

- Don Black (lyricist) (born 1938), English lyricist
- Don Black (white supremacist) (born 1953), American white supremacist activist
- Don Black (baseball) (1917–1959), American baseball player
- Don Black (tennis) (1927–2000), Rhodesian tennis player

== See also ==
- Donald Black (disambiguation)
