= Ralph Black =

Ralph Black may refer to:

- Ralph Black (soccer) (born 1963), former indoor soccer player
- Ralph Niger (c. 1140–c. 1199), also known by the Anglicized name Ralph Black, English chronicler
