= Robert D. Black =

American historian

Robert D. Black (born 19 July 1946, in Chicago, Illinois) is an emeritus professor of Renaissance history at the University of Leeds.

Black received a B.A. with honors from the University of Chicago in 1968, and a Ph.D. from the University of London in 1974. His doctoral supervisor was Nicolai Rubinstein. Black is a Fellow of the Royal Historical Society, and an Honorary Fellow of the Società Toscana per la Storia Patria, of the Accademia Petrarca di Arezzo, and of the Società Storica Aretina. In 1992-1993, he was a Fellow of Villa I Tatti, the Harvard University Center for Italian Renaissance Studies in Florence, where he was a Robert Lehman Visiting Professor in 2014 and a member of the Selection Committee from 2012 to 2016. In 2013, his book Machiavelli was named Book of the Year by The Times Literary Supplement. On 15 November 2019 Black was awarded the 'Premio Mario Salmi' by the Brigata Aretina degli Amici dei Monumenti, a society based in Arezzo and founded in 1906. The prize's citation refers to Black's studies and publications, which have contributed to a reinterpretation of educational and scholastic institutions in Arezzo during the Late Middle Ages and the early Renaissance, as well as of political institutions in Arezzo and Florence in the fifteenth century, clarifying in depth the nature of the relations between the ruling power [Florence] and the subject city [Arezzo], besides the complex interplay between politics and culture'. On 19 July 2021, Black's 75th birthday, a volume of essays was published in his honour, edited by Jonathan Davies and John Monfasani, entitled Renaissance Politics and Culture. Essays in Honour of Robert Black, in the series Brill's Studies in Intellectual History, volume 331 (series editor Han van Ruler). The contents of the volume are 'Publications of Robert Black, 1973-2020' (pp. XII-XXVI, listing 164 publications); Jonathan Davies, 'Robert Black: A Life of Scholarship', pp. 1–13; Jane Black, 'The Problem of Succession for the Visconti and the Sforza', pp. 17–38; John Monfasani, 'The Impuissant and Immoral City: George of Trebizond's Critique of Plato's Laws', pp. 39-58; James Hankins, 'The Virtuous Republic of Francesco Patrizi of Siena', pp. 59-82; Jérérmie Barthas, 'Cleomenes Redivivus: Machiavelli from The Prince to the Discourses', pp. 83-106; John M. Najemy, 'Machiavelli and Arezzo', pp. 107-138; Lorenz Böninger, 'Leon Battista Albert as a Student of the Florentine University and the Priory of San Martino a Gangalandi (1429-1430)', pp. 141-154; James R. Banker, 'The Gherardi Family of Borgo San Sepolcro and Piero della Francesc's Williamstown Virtgin and Child Enthroned with Four Angels', pp. 155–164; David Baldi Bellini, 'Pier Vettori (1499-1585): Philologist and Professor', pp. 165–197; Brian Richardson, 'Print and Trust in Renaissance Italy', pp. 198–218.

Black is married to historian Jane Black, author of Absolutism in Renaissance Milan. Plenitude of Power Under the Visconti and the Sforza, 1329-1535 (2009).

== Selected publications ==
- Benedetto Accolti and the Florentine Renaissance (1985)
- Studio e scuola in Arezzo durante il medioevo e il rinascimento (1996)
- Humanism and Education in Medieval and Renaissance Italy (2001)
- Education and Society in Florentine Tuscany (2007)
- Studies in Renaissance Humanism and Politics (2011)
- Machiavelli (2013)
- La scuola pubblica a Sansepolcro tra Basso Medioevo e Primo Rinascimento (secoli XIV-XV) (2018)
- Arezzo e Firenze nel Quattrocento. Politica e cultura (2019)
- Machiavelli. L'uomo, il politico, il letterato (2022)
- Machiavelli. From Radical to Reactionary (2022)
- Romance and Aretine Humanism in Sienese Comedy (1993) (With Louise George Clubb)
- Boethius's Consolation of Philosophy in Italian Medieval and Renaissance Education (2000) (With Gabriella Pomaro)
- Renaissance Thought: A Reader (2001) (Editor)
- The Renaissance: Critical Concepts in Historical Studies 4 vols (2006) (Editor)
- The Medici: Citizens and Masters (2015) (Editor with John E. Law)
- Palaeography, Manuscript Illumination and Humanism in Renaissance Italy: Studies in Memory of A. C. de la Mare (2016) (Editor with Jill Kraye and Laura Nuvoloni)
