= Adam Black (disambiguation) =

Adam Black (1784–1874) was a Scottish publisher and politician.

Adam Black may also refer to:

- Adam Black (Australian politician) (1839–1902), Member of the Queensland Legislative Assembly
- Adam Black (footballer, born 1898) (1898–1981), Scottish footballer who played for Leicester City
- Adam Black (footballer, born 1992), English footballer who played for Accrington Stanley
- Adam Black (rugby union) (born 1975), English rugby union player
- Adam Black, character in Adam and Evelyne
