= Pat Thane =

Historian

Patricia Thane, known as Pat, is a British historian.

== Career ==
Thane studied history at the University of Oxford, and then completed her PhD under Brian Abel-Smith at the London School of Economics.

She was a lecturer then senior lecturer in the department of social policy at Goldsmiths College London from 1967 until 1994. She was professor of contemporary history at the University of Sussex 1994-2001, then Leverhulme professor of contemporary British history at the Institute of Historical Research 2001-10 and professor of contemporary history at King's College London to 2019 as well as a general historian. She has been a visiting professor at Nanjing University, China, and at universities in Australia, Japan, Taiwan, Chile, New York.

From 2019-2026 she was a visiting professor in history at Birkbeck College, London University. She is Professor Emerita at the University of London. Thane was a co-founder of History & Policy, which publishes historical research freely online.

Thane has a particular interest in the history of gender, old age, pensions, and the welfare state.

Alongside Alastair Reid (Girton College), Simon Szreter, (St John’s College, Cambridge), and Virginia Berridge (London School of Hygiene and Tropical Medicine), Thane is a founder of History & Policy, which publishes historical research freely online.

== Awards and honours ==
Thane was elected as a fellow of the British Academy in 2006. She was elected honorary president of the Social History Society in 2016, after the death of Asa Briggs, who was a member for forty years.

== Selected publications ==
- Thane, Pat (1982), The foundations of the welfare state, Social policy in modern Britain, Longman, ISBN 9780582295155
- Johnson, Paul (1994), 20th century britain - economic, social and cultural change, contributed in sections 'The social, economic and political status of women' and 'Women since 1945', Longman, ISBN 0582228174
- Thane, Pat (2000). Old Age in English History. Oxford [UK] ; New York: Oxford University Press. ISBN 0-19-820382-9.
- Thane, Pat (2005), The long history of old age, Thames & Hudson, ISBN 9780500251263
- Thane, Pat; Breitenbach, Esther (2010), Women and citizenship in Britain and Ireland in the twentieth century : what difference did the vote make?, Continuum, ISBN 978-1441149008
- Thane, Pat; Evans, Tanya (2012), Sinners? Scroungers? Saints? : unmarried motherhood in twentieth-century England, Oxford University Press, ISBN 978-0199578504
- Thane, Pat (2 August 2018). Divided Kingdom. Cambridge University Press. ISBN 978-1-108-60756-8.
- Thane, Pat (17 October 2024). The Rise and Fall of the British Welfare State. London New York Oxford New Delhi Sydney: Bloomsbury Academic. ISBN 978-1-350-41441-9.
