= Jeff Black =

Jeff Black may refer to:

- Jeff Black (singer-songwriter) (born 1962), American singer-songwriter
- Jeff Black (businessman) (born 1961), American chief executive officer
- Jeffrey Black (born 1962), Australian opera singer
