= Arthur Black =

Arthur Black may refer to:

- Arthur "Daddy" Black (1877–1932), American businessman
- Arthur Black (humorist) (1943–2018), Canadian writer and radio humorist
- Arthur Black (mathematician) (1851–1893), English mathematician
- Arthur Black (Unionist politician) (1888–1968), Unionist politician and judge in Northern Ireland
- Arthur Black (Liberal politician) (1863–1947), member of parliament (MP) for Biggleswade, 1906–1918
- Arthur Black (bowls), Australian lawn bowler
