= Joseph Black (disambiguation) =

Joseph Black (1728–1799) was a Scottish physician, physicist, and chemist.

Joseph Black may also refer to:

- Joe Black (Joseph Black, 1924–2002), American baseball player
- Joseph Cofer Black (born 1950), American spy
- Joseph Laurence Black (1829–1907), Canadian politician
- Joseph Black (bowls) (c. 1909–c. 1988), Scottish lawn bowler
- Joseph Black (footballer), Scottish footballer

== See also ==
- Joe Black (disambiguation)
- Joseph Blackburn (disambiguation)
