= Frank Black (disambiguation) =

Black Francis (born 1965), also known as Frank Black, is an American musician.

Frank Black may also refer to:

- Frank Black (album), the 1993 debut album of Frank Black
- Frank Black (character), protagonist of the TV series Millennium
- Frank Bunting Black (1869–1945), merchant and politician from New Brunswick, Canada
- Frank J. Black (1894–1968), American vaudeville composer and conductor of the Cities Service Concerts in the 1930s/40s
- Frank S. Black (1853–1913), governor of New York from 1897 to 1898

== See also ==
- Francis Black (disambiguation)
- Frank Edwards (blues musician) (1909–2002), also known as Black Frank
