= Scott Black =

Scott Black may refer to:

- Scott C. Black (born 1952), American military lawyer and former Judge Advocate General of the US Army
- Scott M. Black, American investor, philanthropist and art collector
