= Stephen Black (playwright) =

South African playwright (1880–1931)

Stephen William Black (1880, Claremont, Cape – 1931) was a South African playwright, who has been called "South Africa's first professional dramatist".

Schooled in his twenties, Black earnt money as a boxer and journalist before the success of his satirical farce Love and the Hyphen in 1908. For the next two decades, Black was dramatist, actor and manager for a theatre company which toured his plays through South Africa and Rhodesia, 'from Wynberg to the Victoria Falls'. Despite Black's popular commercial success, his plays were never published in his own lifetime. He published two novels under the pseudonym T. Werner Laurie.

== Works ==
Plays

- Love and the Hyphen, premiered 16 November 1908
- Helena's Hope, Ltd., premiered 1910
- The Uitlanders, 1911
- A Boer's Honour, 1912
- The Flapper

Novels

- (as T. Werner Laurie) The Dorp, 1920
- (as T. Werner Laurie) The Golden Calf: A Story of the Diamond Fields, London, 1925
- Limelight (unpublished)
