= Bo Black =

American model (1946–2020)

- Born: Elizabeth Black; February 7, 1946; St. Louis, Missouri
- Died: July 24, 2020 (aged 74); Scottsdale, Arizona
- Education: University of Wisconsin–Madison (BA)
- Spouse: Tom Trebelhorn

Elizabeth "Bo" Black (February 7, 1946 – July 24, 2020) was an American model and businesswoman who was the festival director of Summerfest in Milwaukee, Wisconsin.

== Early life and education ==
Elizabeth Black was born in St. Louis, Missouri, into a Catholic family. She was raised in and raised in Clayton, Missouri. As a child, she suffered from high blood pressure.

Black was a student and a cheerleader at University of Wisconsin–Madison in the 1960s, graduating in 1969 with a degree in education. She later earned a teaching certificate.

== Playboy appearances ==
While she was a college student, Black appeared in a photoshoot for a Playboy college issue in 1967. She was subsequently contacted for another photoshoot for the front cover. She appeared on the September Playboy cover, wearing a green football jersey and knee-high athletic socks with a helmet under her arm. Playboy had requested a nude photoshoot, but Black declined, as she wanted to become a nun at that time. For the 50th Playboy anniversary, her front cover image was used on T-shirts.

== Career ==
Black worked as a math teacher.

As Summerfest director, she was the face of the festival for almost 20 years. Bo dedicated nearly 20 years of her career to establishing Milwaukee as the City of Festivals. She worked with various ethnic festivals and other charitable causes. She championed 'Operation Summer Chance', a youth employment program which aimed to provide Milwaukee's youth working experience at Henry Maier Festival Park. This program employs thousands of Wisconsin youth on an annual basis.

== Personal life ==
Black was a single mother in the 1990s. She married Tom Trebelhorn, a former manager of the Milwaukee Brewers professional baseball team, on August 15, 2000.

Black experienced many serious health problems during the last two decades of her life, and she shared information about it, including her recoveries. From aneurysms and a coma to coronary heart disease, depression and a stroke, she discussed these issues publicly to keep others aware of health issues, especially for women. Black died on July 24, 2020, in Scottsdale, Arizona, at age 74.
