= Samuel Black (disambiguation) =

Samuel Black (1780–1840) was a Canadian fur trader and explorer.

Samuel or Sam Black may also refer to:

- Samuel Black (state representative) (1827–1916), Republican politician from the U.S. state of Wisconsin
- Samuel Charles Black (1869–1921), fifth president of Washington & Jefferson College
- Samuel W. Black (1816–1862), governor of the Nebraska Territory
- Samuel Luccock Black (1859–1929), Democratic politician from the U.S. state of Ohio
- Sam Black (artist) (1913–1997), British-Canadian artist
- Sam Black (cricketer) (born 1947), cricketer for Middlesex
- Sam Black (public relations) (1915–1999), British public relations professor
- Sam Black (singer) (born 1990), contestant on series fourteen of The X Factor
- Sammy Black (1905–1977), Scottish footballer who played for Plymouth Argyle
- Reverend Sam Black (1813–1899), Methodist circuit rider from the U.S. state of West Virginia
- Sam Black, a character in Misfits and Magic

== See also ==
- Sammy Turner (Samuel Black, born 1932), American singer
