= Kevin Black =

Kevin Black may refer to:

- Kevin Black (broadcaster) (1943–2013), New Zealand radio broadcaster
- Kevin Black (wrestling coach) (born 1979), former American wrestler and current wrestling coach
- Kevin Black (The Red Green Show), a fictional character
