= Ian Black =

Ian Black may refer to:

- Ian Black (footballer, born 1924) (1924–2012), Scottish footballer
- Ian Black (footballer, born 1960), Scottish footballer
- Ian Black (footballer, born 1985), his son, Scottish footballer
- Ian Black (journalist) (1953–2023), British The Guardian columnist, correspondent and writer
- Ian Black (meteorologist) (born 1962), weathercaster in Ottawa, Canada
- Ian Black (politician) (1943–2020), Australian politician
- Ian Black (priest) (born 1962), Dean of Newport, Wales, from 2021
- Ian Black (swimmer) (born 1941), Scottish swimmer, BBC Sports Personality of the Year 1958
- Ian Stuart Black (1915–1997), British television screenwriter
- Ian Black (snooker player) (1954–2006), Scottish snooker player
- Ian Black, former member of Field Music, currently frontman of Slug

== See also ==
- Michael Ian Black (born 1971), American actor, comedian and comedy writer
- Iain Black (born 1967), Canadian politician in British Columbia
