= James Black =

James, Jimmy or Jim Black may refer to:

== Sportsmen ==
- James Black (cricketer) (1873–1920), New Zealand cricketer
- James Black (ice hockey) (born 1969), former NHL hockey player
- Jim Black (footballer) (born 1943), Scottish footballer
- Jimmy Black (footballer) (1899–1933), Scottish football defender
- James Black (hurler) (born 1992), Northern Irish hurler
- Jimmy Black (basketball) (born 1960), American basketball player
- James Black (defensive end) (1956–2018), American football defensive end
- James Black (rugby union) (born 1958), Australian rugby union player
- James Black Jr. (born 1998), American chess player

== Politicians ==
- James Black (Pennsylvania politician) (1793–1872), U.S. congressman from Pennsylvania
- James Black (prohibitionist) (1823–1893), American temperance movement leader and first presidential candidate of the Prohibition Party
- James A. Black (1793–1848), U.S. representative from South Carolina
- James B. Black (born 1935), speaker of the North Carolina House of Representatives, 1999–2006
- James C. C. Black (1842–1928), U.S. congressman from Georgia and Confederate Army veteran
- James D. Black (1849–1938), governor of Kentucky for part of 1919

== Musicians, artists and entertainers ==
- James Milton Black (1856–1938), American hymn composer
- James Black (guitarist) (born 1975), Canadian guitarist in the band Finger Eleven
- Jimmy Carl Black (1938–2008), American drummer and vocalist for the Mothers of Invention
- James R. Black (born 1962), American actor and former professional American football player
- Jim Black (born 1967), American jazz musician
- James N. Black (1940–1988), American jazz drummer
- James Black, Australian guitarist and keyboard player formerly with Mondo Rock and The Black Sorrows

== Religious figures ==
- James Black (bishop) (1894–1968), first bishop of Paisley, Scotland
- James Black (clergyman) (1797–1886), Scottish-born clergyman in Canada
- James Black (moderator) (1879–1948), moderator of the General Assembly of the Church of Scotland in 1938–1939

== Doctors and scientists ==
- James Black (pharmacologist) (1924–2010), British doctor and pharmacologist, winner of the Nobel Prize for Medicine
- James Gow Black (1835–1914), New Zealand chemist, mineralogist, lecturer and university professor
- James Black (physician, born 1787) (1787–1867), English scientist who published "An Inquiry into the Capillary Circulation of Blood" in 1825
- James R. Black (scientist), researcher in electromigration and for whom Black's equation is named
- James F. Black (1919–1988), senior scientist at Exxon who reported the impact of fossil fuels on climate to company executives

== Others ==
- James Black (blacksmith) (1800–1872), creator of the Bowie knife
- James Wallace Black (1825–1896), American photographer
- James Black (educator) (1826–1890), president of the University of Iowa, 1868–1870
- James Tait Black, namesake of the literary prize, the James Tait Black Memorial Prize
- James Black (Case Closed), a character from Case Closed

== See also ==
- Jim Blacker (born 1945), English footballer
