= Michelle Black =

American writer and attorney

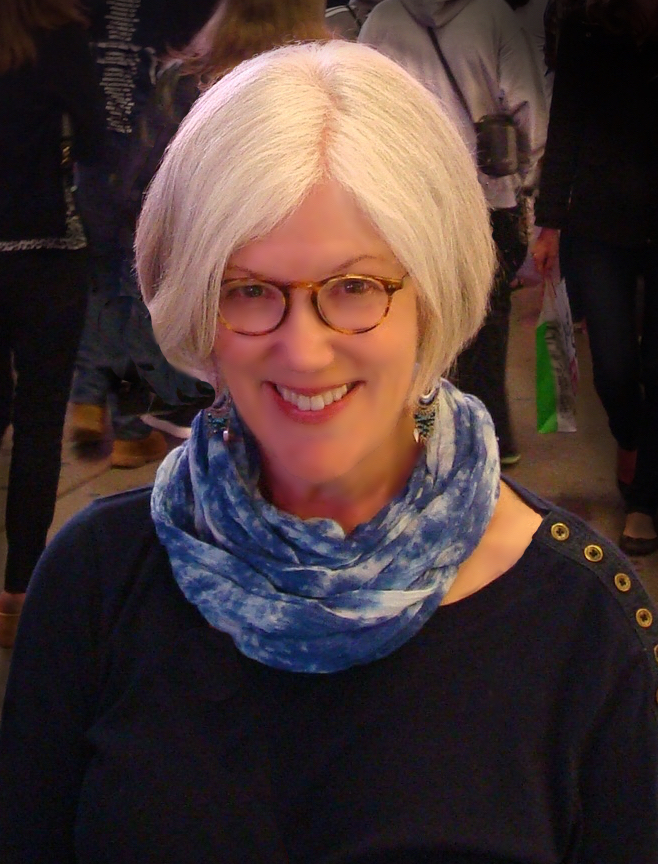
- Born: Topeka, Kansas, U.S.
- Education: University of Kansas; Washburn University School of Law (JD)
- Occupations: Writer and attorney
- Writing career
- Genres: Historical fiction Historical mystery novels
- Notable works: An Uncommon Enemy; Solomon Spring; Séance in Sepia
- Website: www.michelleblack.com

Michelle Black is an American author of historical fiction and historical mystery novels. She is also an attorney, former bookstore owner, and publisher.

== Early life and education ==
Black was born in Topeka, Kansas. She studied Fine Arts at the University of Kansas, graduating cum laude with a Bachelor of Arts degree in Sociology from Washburn University. She received a Juris Doctor degree from the Washburn University School of Law with honors in 1980.

== Career ==
Black practiced law in both the public and private sectors until 1993, when she moved to Frisco, Colorado and began writing full-time. There she owned an independent bookstore called Wolf Moon Books and formed a small press which published (in a nonprofit partnership with a linguist on the Northern Cheyenne Reservation) a Cheyenne language course called “Let’s Talk Cheyenne”.

Her first two novels (Never Come Down and Lightning in a Drought Year) were published electronically by one of the first digital publishers, Hard Shell Word Factory. Her three Eden Murdoch novels (An Uncommon Enemy, Solomon Spring, and The Second Glass of Absinthe) were published by Macmillan Publishers under the Tor-Forge imprint, with the second and third books in the series carrying the subtitle “Mysteries of the Victorian West.”

Her sixth novel, Séance in Sepia, featured real-life feminist Victoria Woodhull as its protagonist and highlights Black's ongoing interest in the world of the Victorian occult. Black's grandmother was raised in the Spiritualist Church, and spiritualists have figured prominently in her most recent titles.

Black's writing has been recognized by the Colorado Center for the Book, the Oklahoma Center for the Book, the WILLA Literary Award, and the Colorado Independent Publishers Association.

Black is an active participant in the Steampunk movement, frequently appearing at Steampunk conventions like Steamcon and writing articles on the topic.

== Bibliography ==
=== Novels ===
- Never Come Down (1996)
- Lightning in a Drought Year (1999)
- An Uncommon Enemy (2001) USA, Forge Books, ISBN 978-0765301031
- Solomon Spring (2002) USA Forge Books, ISBN 978-0765304650
- The Second Glass of Absinthe (2003) USA, Forge Books, ISBN 978-0-7653-0854-2
- Séance in Sepia (2011) USA, Five Star (Gale/Cengage) ISBN 978-1432825485

=== Short fiction ===
- The Hundred Day Men, appearing in Westward: A Fictional History of the American West (Dale Walker editor)(2003), Forge Books, ISBN 978-0765304513
