= Paul Black =

Paul Black may refer to:

- Paul Black (musician) (born 1959), American singer and drummer
- Paul Black (Scottish footballer) (born 1977), former footballer with Dundee United
- Paul Black (English footballer) (born 1990), footballer with the Carolina RailHawks
- Paul Black (author) (born 1957), American science fiction author
- Paul Black (director) (born 1967), British-Canadian film director
- Paul Black (educational researcher) (1930–2026), British educational researcher
- Paul Black (comedian) (born 1996), Scottish writer, director and comedian
