= Dorothy Black =

Dorothy Black may refer to:

- Dorothy Black (novelist) (1890–1977), British romance novelist
- Dorothy Black (actress) (1899–1985), South African-British actress
- Dorothy Black (translator) (1914–2004), South African translator and agent
