= Donald Black (business executive) =

British businessman and accountant

Donald Black was a British businessman and accountant in Hong Kong. Black was a partner of the Peat, Marwick, Mitchell & Co. until he retired in March 1962. He was appointed provisionally to the Legislative Council as an unofficial member during the absence of Hugh Barton from July to November 1960.
