= Henry the Black =

Henry the Black may refer to:

- Henry III, Holy Roman Emperor (1016–1056)
- Henry IX, Duke of Bavaria (died 1126)
- Enrique of Malacca, a servant of Ferdinand Magellan
