= Edward Black =

Edward Black may refer to:

- Edward Black (minister) (1793–1845), Canadian minister and teacher
- Edward Black (producer) (1900–1948), English film producer
- Edward J. Black (1806–1846), American politician, U.S. representative for Georgia
- Edward Black (soldier) (1853–1872), youngest serving soldier of the American Civil War
- Eddie Wolecki Black (born 1965), Scottish football player and manager
