= Olivia Black =

Danish handball player (born 1994)

Personal information
- Full name: Olivia Black
- Nationality: Danish
- Born: 16 March 1994 (age 32) Copenhagen, Denmark
- Height: 1.79 m (5 ft 10 in)

Sport
- Sport: Handball
- Position: Centre back
- Current club: Ajax København
- Number: 4

Youth career
- Years: Team
- 2011-2013: Rødovre HK

Senior clubs
- Years: Team
- 2012-2013: Rødovre HK
- 2013-2018: Roskilde Håndbold
- 2018-2019: Skövde HF
- 2019-: Ajax København

Olivia Black (born 16 March 1994) is a Danish handball player who currently plays for Ajax København. She has previously played for the Denmark national youth team.

She has also been a part of the Denmark national beach handball team, where she participated at 2017 European Beach Handball Championship, placing 4th. She participated the following year in the 2018 Women's Beach Handball World Championships, placing 5th.

In May 2020, she signed a one-year contract with the Danish League club Ajax København.
