= Harry Black (UNICEF) =

Canadian humanitarian (1934–2017)

Harry Samuel Black
- Born: July 30, 1934; Toronto, Ontario, Canada
- Died: February 4, 2017 (aged 82)
- Awards: Order of Canada

Harry Samuel Black, OC (July 30, 1934 – February 4, 2017) was a Canadian humanitarian. He was the Executive Director of UNICEF Canada for 26 years.

== Life and career ==
Born in Toronto, Ontario, he graduated from Ryerson Polytechnical Institute in Architectural Science in 1957 and McMaster University in 1966. He also did post-graduate studies at York University in 1970. In 1958, he started working for the Red Cross Society in the Blood Donor Service. From 1960 to 1963, he was the Director of the Toronto Blood Depot. From 1963 to 1973, he was the Fund Raising Director for Canadian Red Cross Society. In 1973, he was appointed National Executive Director of UNICEF Canada. From 1979 to 1983, he was an author and editor for UNICEF Communique.

Black was the author of the book Canada and the Nobel Prize: Biographies, Portraits and Fascinating Facts (Pembroke Publishers, 2002, ISBN 1-55138-150-8)

In 2002, he was made an Officer of the Order of Canada.

Black died on February 4, 2017, at the age of 82.
