= Maxine Black =

Maxine Black may refer to:

- Max Black, character in 2 Broke Girls
- Maxine Black, character in Last Time Out played by Betty Buckley
