= Lawrence Black (cricketer) =

English cricketer

Personal information
- Full name: Lawrence Garfield Black
- Born: 15 September 1881; Lambeth, London, England
- Died: 14 August 1959 (aged 77); Dewsbury, Yorkshire, England
- Batting: Left-handed
- Bowling: Left-arm medium

Domestic team information
- Years: Team
- 1903–1919: Hampshire

Career statistics
Competition	First-class
Matches	3
Runs scored	36
Batting average	7.20
100s/50s	–/–
Top score	21
Balls bowled	276
Wickets	1
Bowling average	229.00
5 wickets in innings	–
10 wickets in match	–
Best bowling	1/27
Catches/stumpings	3/–
- Source: Cricinfo, 18 January 2010

Lawrence Garfield Black (15 September 1881 – 14 August 1959) was an English cricketer. Black was a left-handed batsman who bowled left-arm medium pace.

Black made his first-class debut for Hampshire against the Gentlemen of Philadelphia in 1903. On debut, Black took his only first-class wicket, that of Philadelphia batsman John Lester.

After the First World War and sixteen years after making his debut for Hampshire, Black made his second first-class appearance for Hampshire in 1919. Black played three matches in the 1919 County Championship against Middlesex, Surrey and Yorkshire.

Black died at Dewsbury, Yorkshire on 14 August 1959.
