= Susan Black =

Susan Black may refer to:

- Susan Easton Black (born 1944), American historian
- Sue Black, Baroness Black of Strome (Susan Margaret Black, born 1961), Scottish forensic anthropologist
- Sue Black (computer scientist) (Susan Elizabeth Black, born 1962), British computer scientist, academic and social entrepreneur
- Susan H. Black (born 1943), American judge
- Susan Black (1936–2020), British film actress known as Susan Beaumont
