= Bobby Black (rugby union) =

NZ international rugby union player (1893-1916)

- Born: Robert Stanley Black; 24 August 1893 Arrowtown, New Zealand
- Died: 21 September 1916 (aged 23) Somme, France
- Height: 1.65 m (5 ft 5 in)
- Weight: 73 kg (161 lb)
- School: Otago Boys' High School
- Occupation: Bank clerk

Rugby union career
- Position: First five-eighth
Provincial / State sides
Years	Team	Apps	(Points)
1911–14, 1915	Otago	12	(0)
1914	Buller	2	
International career
Years	Team	Apps	(Points)
1914	New Zealand	1	(0)
- Military career
- Allegiance: New Zealand
- Branch: New Zealand Army
- Service years: 1915–16
- Rank: Private
- Service number: 9/2048
- Units: Otago Mounted Rifles; Canterbury Regiment
- Conflicts: World War I; Battle of the Somme †
- Memorials: Caterpillar Valley (New Zealand) Memorial

Robert Stanley Black (24 August 1893 – 21 September 1916) was a New Zealand rugby union player. A first five-eighth, Black represented Otago and Buller at a provincial level, and was a member of the New Zealand national side, selected for the All Blacks, on their 1914 tour of Australia whilst representing the Otago province.

He played in six of the matches on tour including the first test and scored three tries. Working as a clerk in the Bank of New South Wales, Black was posted, on his return from Sydney, to Westport where he played two games for Buller in September. He was back in Dunedin in 1915 but Pirates did not field a team in the senior championship so he transferred to the University of Otago club and played twice for Otago.

Black enlisted in the Otago Mounted Rifles in November 1915 and, after transferring to the Canterbury Regiment, saw active service in the Battle of the Somme. He was killed in action on 21 September 1916, and he was memorialised on the Caterpillar Valley (New Zealand) Memorial, which commemorates over 1200 New Zealand soldiers who died in the Battles of the Somme in 1916 for whom there is no known grave, although his body was subsequently identified and buried.
