= Henry Black (Maine politician) =

American politician

Henry W. Black (March 26, 1924 - January 13, 2002) was an American politician from Maine. A Republican from West Baldwin, Maine, Black served 2 terms (1984-1988) in the Maine Senate.

In 1996, Black sought the State Representative seat for District 47. He was defeated by incumbent Richard Thompson.
