= Angela Black (news anchor) =

American television news anchor and reporter

Angela Black is an American television news anchor and reporter, known primarily for her work for KABC-TV in Los Angeles, California and for being one of the earliest prominent African-American newscasters in Los Angeles television history.

== Biography ==
Born in Jacksonville, Florida to Army Major Bennie L. Canty and schoolteacher Bess Canty, Black spent her childhood on Army bases Camp Sullivan in Whittier, Alaska and Fort Eustis in Virginia before settling with her parents and siblings in Jacksonville. After graduating from Bishop Kinney Catholic School, she traveled to Nashville to attend Vanderbilt University, ultimately transferring to and graduating from Jacksonville University with a BA in English.

Black is known for her 12-year career spent at KABC-TV. Primarily a field reporter and weekend anchor who periodically anchored alongside Jerry Dunphy on weeknights, she was a member of the Eyewitness News team of the late 1970s and 1980s.

Some of her professional experiences involve hosting the nationwide "Evening of the Stars" United Negro College Fund telethon, producing a documentary on blacks in Hollywood, training as a firefighter with the Los Angeles Fire Department, and covering a Ku Klux Klan triple cross burning during her time on the Los Angeles airwaves.

Black is a veteran news reporter and anchor, having worked for KABC-TV and KCBS-TV in Los Angeles, California, and for enterprises such as Headline News, PBS, and Turner Entertainment.
