= Bobby Black (footballer, born 1915) =

English footballer

Personal information
- Full name: Robert Watson Black
- Date of birth: 17 July 1915
- Place of birth: Washington, England
- Date of death: 1979 (aged 63–64)
- Place of death: Bridgnorth, England
- Height: 5 ft 10 in (1.78 m)
- Position: Wing half

Youth career
- –1935: West Ham United

Senior career*
Years	Team	Apps	(Gls)
1936–1938	West Ham United	2	(0)
	→ Larne (loan)	48	(0)
1938–1945	Clapton Orient	23	(0)
- * Club domestic league appearances and goals

Robert Watson Black (17 July 1915 – 1979) was an English professional footballer who played in the Football League for Clapton Orient and West Ham United as a wing half.

== Personal life ==
Black served in the Royal Navy during the Second World War.

== Career statistics ==
Appearances and goals by club, season and competition
Club	Season	League			FA Cup		Total	
Club	Season	Division	Apps	Goals	Apps	Goals	Apps	Goals
West Ham United	1936–37	Second Division	1	0	0	0	1	0
West Ham United	1937–38	Second Division	1	0	0	0	1	0
Career total			1	0	0	0	1	0
