= Simon Szreter =

History professor

Simon Szreter is professor of history and public policy at the University of Cambridge and a fellow of St John's College, Cambridge. He is a specialist in demographic and social history, the history of empirical social science, and the relationship between history and public policy issues.

== Career ==
In 2009, Szreter was awarded the Arthur J. Viseltear Prize by the American Public Health Association.

With Keith Breckenridge, he edited Registration and Recognition: Documenting the Person in World History, which was published by Oxford University Press and the British Academy in 2012 as part of the proceedings of the British Academy based on a workshop held in Cambridge in 2010. In 2019, he was the joint winner of the IPPR's Economics Prize.

He is the co-founder of History and Policy, an international network of historians.

== Selected publications ==
- Fertility, class and gender in Britain 1860-1940 (Cambridge 1996)
- Changing family size in England and Wales 1891-1911: place, class and demography (co-authored, Cambridge 2001)
- Categories and contexts. Anthropological and Historical Studies in Critical Demography (co-edited, Oxford 2004)
- Health and Wealth: Studies in History and Policy (Rochester University Press 2005)
- Sex Before the Sexual Revolution: Intimate Life in England 1918-1963. 2010.
- Registration and Recognition: Documenting the Person in World History. Oxford University Press & The British Academy, 2012. (Edited with Keith Breckenridge) (Proceedings of the British Academy) ISBN 978-0197265314
