= Black John =

Black John is a nickname.

It may refer to:

== People ==
- "Black John" John Gotti (1940-2002), U.S. mobster
- "Black John" John MacCrimmon (died 1822), a bagpiper, member of the MacCrimmon (piping family)
- "Black John" (18th century), a court jester of the Arscotts of Tetcott

== Fictional characters ==
- Black John, a character from the short story included with House of Gold & Bones – Part 2
- Black John, a character from the 1925 story Uncle Valentine
- Black John, a character from the 1928 film serial Tarzan the Mighty
- Black John, a character from the 1929 film serial Tarzan the Tiger
- Black John, a character from the 2016 short story "Cookie Jar"
- Black John, a fictional character from the 2004 Indian film Taarzan: The Wonder Car
- Black John Ambrose, a fictional character from the 1999 film Ride with the Devil

== See also ==
- "Black John" (song), a 2013 song by Stone Sour off the album House of Gold & Bones – Part 2
- Karajan (surname), literally "Black John"
- Black Jack (disambiguation)
- John Black (disambiguation)
- Jack Black (disambiguation)
- Black (disambiguation)
- John (disambiguation)
