= Black Jack =

Blackjack is a popular casino-gambling card game.

Black Jack or Blackjack may also refer to:

== Places ==
=== Australia ===
- Black Jack, Queensland, a locality in Queensland
- Black Jack, a civil parish of Pottinger County, New South Wales
- Black Jack Hill, near Gunnedah, New South Wales

=== United States ===
- Black Jack (Red Oak, North Carolina), a historic plantation house
- Black Jack, Kansas, an unincorporated community
- Black Jack, Kentucky, an unincorporated community
- Black Jack, Missouri, a city
- Blackjack, Cherokee County, Texas, an unincorporated community
- Blackjack, Smith County, Texas, an unincorporated community
- The Blackjacks (house), a historic house in Osage County, Oklahoma

== People ==
- Black Jack (nickname)
- Ada Blackjack (1898–1983), Iñupiaq woman
- Roddy Blackjack (c. 1927–2013), Canadian elder and former Chief of the Little Salmon/Carmacks First Nation of the Yukon Territory
- Blackjack Lanza (1935–2021), ring name of former professional wrestler John Lanza
- Blackjack Mulligan (1942–2016), ring name of former professional wrestler Robert Jack Windham
- "Blackjack" Hoss Taylor, a professional wrestler in All-Star Wrestling

== Arts and entertainment ==
=== Fictional characters ===
- Black Jack (manga character), the main character of the 1973 manga series of the same name
- Blackjack (Transformers), a fictional character in the Transformers universe
- Nickname for Jonathon Randal, a supporting character in Outlander
- John "Black Jack" Geary, the main character in The Lost Fleet series of novels
- Blackjack (Percy Jackson), in the Percy Jackson & the Olympians novel series by Rick Riordan
- BlackJack SquarePants, a minor character in the TV series SpongeBob SquarePants

=== Films ===
- Black Jack (1927 film), an American silent Western film
- Black Jack (1950 film), written and directed by Julien Duvivier
- Black Jack (1968 film), a spaghetti western
- Black Jack (1979 film), by Ken Loach
- Blackjack (1978 film), an American crime drama
- Blackjack (1990 film), directed by Colin Nutley
- Blackjack (1998 film), a TV movie directed by John Woo
- BlackJack (film series) (2003–2007), a series of Australian seven TV movies starring Colin Friels

=== Games and cards ===
- Black Jack (Hearts), a variant of Hearts
- Black Jack (Switch), also known as Switch, a name given to some variations of Crazy Eights in the UK
- A jack (playing card) from a black suit, a jack of clubs or jack of spades
- Blackjack (Atari 2600 video game), a video game cartridge developed by Atari
- Blackjack, an NES video game developed by Odyssey Software; see American Video Entertainment

=== Literature ===
- Black Jack (manga), a 1973 manga series by Osamu Tezuka
- "Black Jack", a short story by Rudyard Kipling in the collection Soldiers Three
- Black Jack, a 2003 novel by Finnish writer Reijo Mäki
- Black Jack, a 1968 historical fiction novel by English writer Leon Garfield

=== Music ===
==== Groups ====
- Black Jack (Chilean band), a Chilean rock band
- Black Jack (Australian band), an Australian heavy metal band
- Blackjack (American band), an American rock band
- BlackJack (Swedish band), a Swedish dansband

==== Albums ====
- Blackjack (Blackjack album), by the American band, 1979
- Blackjack (Donald Byrd album), 1968

==== Songs ====
- "Black Jack", by The Hives from Barely Legal
- "Black Jack", by Junkie XL from Big Sounds of the Drags
- "Black Jacks", by Girls Aloud from Tangled Up
- "Blackjack", by Airbourne from Runnin' Wild
- "Blackjack", by Aminé from OnePointFive
- "Blackjack", by Death Grips from The Money Store
- "Blackjack", by Everclear from Slow Motion Daydream
- "Blackjack", by Ray Charles from Yes Indeed!

==== Other uses in music ====
- Blackjack, a 21-note scale in the miracle temperament

=== Television ===
- "Black Jack" (Jericho), a 2007 episode of the television series Jericho
- "Blackjack" (Fear the Walking Dead), a 2018 episode of Fear the Walking Dead
- "BlackJack", a 2007 episode of SpongeBob SquarePants
- "Blackjack", an episode of the TV series The Adventures of Ellery Queen

== Brands and enterprises ==
- Black Jack (confectionery), aniseed flavour chews
- Black Jack (gum), a brand of chewing gum
- BlackJack (phone), a mobile phone made by Samsung
  - BlackJack II (phone), a mobile phone made by Samsung
- Blackjack Pizza, a chain of pizza delivery restaurants in Colorado, US

== Military and law enforcement ==
- Blackjack (weapon), a type of baton for law enforcement
- RQ-21 Blackjack, a small tactical unmanned air system
- Black Jack Brigade, nickname of the U.S. 2nd Brigade Combat Team, 1st Cavalry Division
- Tupolev Tu-160 (NATO reporting name: Blackjack), a Russian bomber
- VMF-441, nicknamed The Blackjacks, a US Marine Corps fighter squadron
- Battle of Black Jack, a battle in Kansas preceding the American Civil War
- National Society of Blackjacks, a High School Junior Reserve Officer Training Corps leadership program in the US

== Science ==
- Black jack (fish) (Caranx lugubris), a gamefish
- Blackjack oak or Quercus marilandica, a small tree
- Black jack, often weedy plants of the genus Bidens from the family of Asteraceae
- Sphalerite, a mineral sometimes called black-jack by miners
- Blackjack (satellite), a constellation of American surveillance satellites

== Sports ==
- Berlin Blackjacks, a short-lived team in the Ligue Nord-Américaine de Hockey
- Ottawa BlackJacks, a team in the Canadian Elite Basketball League

== Other uses ==
- Black Jack (horse) (1947–1976), a horse used in U.S. Armed Forces full honors funerals
- Black Jack (stamp), a US postage stamp
- STV Black Jack, a 1904 Canadian brigantine sailing ship
- The Blackjacks, a professional wrestling tag team

== See also ==
- Blakdyak (1969–2016), Filipino actor and singer
- Blak Jak (born 1983), American rapper
- Blk Jks, signifying Black Jacks, South African rock band
- John Gotti (1940–2002), nicknamed "Black John", U.S. mobster
- Jack of clubs (disambiguation)
- Jack of spades (disambiguation)
- Jack Black (disambiguation)
- John Black (disambiguation)
