= House of Gold & Bones =

House of Gold & Bones may refer to:

- House of Gold & Bones – Part 1, the first part of a double concept album by the band Stone Sour, released in 2012
- House of Gold & Bones – Part 2, the second part of a double concept album by the band Stone Sour, released in 2013
- House of Gold & Bones (comic), a four-part comic mini-series published by Dark Horse Comics and written by Corey Taylor (a member of the bands Slipknot and Stone Sour)
