= Samsung Epix =

Smartphone model

Samsung SGH-i907 (Epix)
- Manufacturer: Samsung Electronics
- Availability by region: October 21, 2008
- Predecessor: Samsung SGH-i617 (BlackJack II)
- Related: Samsung SGH-i780
- Compatible networks: Quad-band GSM, tri-band HSDPA
- Form factor: Candy bar
- Dimensions: 4.56×2.41×0.51 in (116×61×13 mm)
- Weight: 4.4 oz (120 g)
- Operating system: Windows Mobile 6.1 Professional
- CPU: Marvell PXA310 624 MHz
- Removable storage: microSDHC (32GB max)
- Battery: 1800 mAh
- Rear camera: 2.0 MP
- Display: 2.5" 65K TFT, 320×320 px
- Connectivity: Wi-Fi, Bluetooth 2.0; Supported profiles: A2DP, AVCTP, AVDTP, AVRCP, GAVDP, HFP 1.5, HID, HSP, OBEX (OPP, BPP) PAN, SPP
- Data inputs: QWERTY keypad, touchscreen, optical trackpad

The Samsung SGH-i907, marketed as the Samsung Epix in the United States by AT&T Wireless, is a Windows Mobile-based quad-band GSM smartphone manufactured by Samsung.

== Features ==
The device has a candy bar form factor and a 320×320 resistive touchscreen. A QWERTY keyboard with the numeric keys overlaid on keys in the third to fifth column of the keyboard, an optical trackpad, and the touchscreen are used for input. The trackpad has two modes of operation: in one mode, it acts as a mouse (with a mouse cursor displayed on the screen), and in the other, it acts as an 8-directional D-pad.

The phone features 150 MB of internal storage, but its storage capacity can be expanded via microSDHC cards up to 32 GB.

=== Software ===
The phone comes with Pocket Internet Explorer and Windows Media Player, and includes Microsoft Office Mobile, with mobile versions of Microsoft Word, Excel, Pocket Outlook, OneNote Mobile, and PowerPoint Mobile. Additional programs can be added through Microsoft ActiveSync or the AT&T Mall.

ActiveSync functionality prescribes that the computer be equipped with ActiveSync 4.5 or newer. The earliest operating systems on which ActiveSync 4.5 can be installed are Windows NT Workstation 4.0 SP6 (or later) and Windows Me, requiring Internet Explorer 6 to be present in either case. On Windows Vista, connectivity is also possible with Windows Mobile Device Center for Windows Vista.

Text messages can be spell-checked.

== Issues ==
A fair number of users report a "SLOG DUMP" error message appearing on the screen, after which the phone exhibited various issues, such as the phone being unable to receive calls or freezing. In many cases, such problems can be corrected by rebooting the device or removing the battery. The phone also stops playing all audio at times, and the touchscreen may also stop responding. If a standard reboot or battery removal does not fix the problem, the phone can be started in "format mode" for a more complete reboot.

Samsung released an ID1 update addressing many of the issues reported by users, but users report that the update made things worse, introducing things such as a dialing lag or all incoming calls going straight to voicemail.

== Windows Mobile 6.5 ==
Samsung has released an official upgrade to Windows Mobile 6.5 for the Epix, in June 2010. Users have had success installing unofficial Windows Mobile 6.5 on the Epix for the last year, although it currently has various issues such as artifacts appearing around the mouse pointer. The official release fixes most of the problems in the unofficial ROM, including the mouse pointer, GPS issues, speed, and battery life.

== Specifications ==
Specifications from the Samsung website:

- Processor: Marvell PXA310 624 MHz
- Screen size: 2.5 inches
- Dimensions: 4.56 x 2.41 x 0.51 inches
- Weight: 4.4 ounces
- Operating System: Windows Mobile Professional 6.1/6.5
- RAM: 150 MB
- ROM: 256 MB
- Expandable storage: microSD slot, supports up to 32 GB microSDHC cards
- Screen: 320 × 320 pixels, 65K colors, resistive touchscreen
- Input method: touchscreen, QWERTY keypad, and optical trackpad
- Frequency bands: Quad-band GSM (850, 900, 1800, and 1900 MHz), tri-band HSDPA
- Data connection: 3G (UMTS and HSDPA) and 2G (EDGE and GPRS)
  - aGPS on board
  - Wi-Fi capable: IEEE 802.11b, IEEE 802.11g
- Bluetooth 2.0
- 2.0 megapixel camera that can take still photos and videos
  - Multiple resolutions: 1600 x 1200, 640 x 480, 320 x 240, and 176 x 144
  - 4X digital zoom
  - Self timer
  - Multi-shot
  - Brightness level adjustment
  - Mosaic Shooting Mode
  - No flash
- Supported video formats: MPEG4, H.263, WMV, 3GP
- Supported audio formats: MP3, WAV, AAC, AAC+, eAAC+
- Battery: Removable 3.7-volt Lithium-ion, 1800 mAh, up to 7 hours of talk time and up to 14 days of standby
