= Samsung SGH-i600 =

Smartphone model

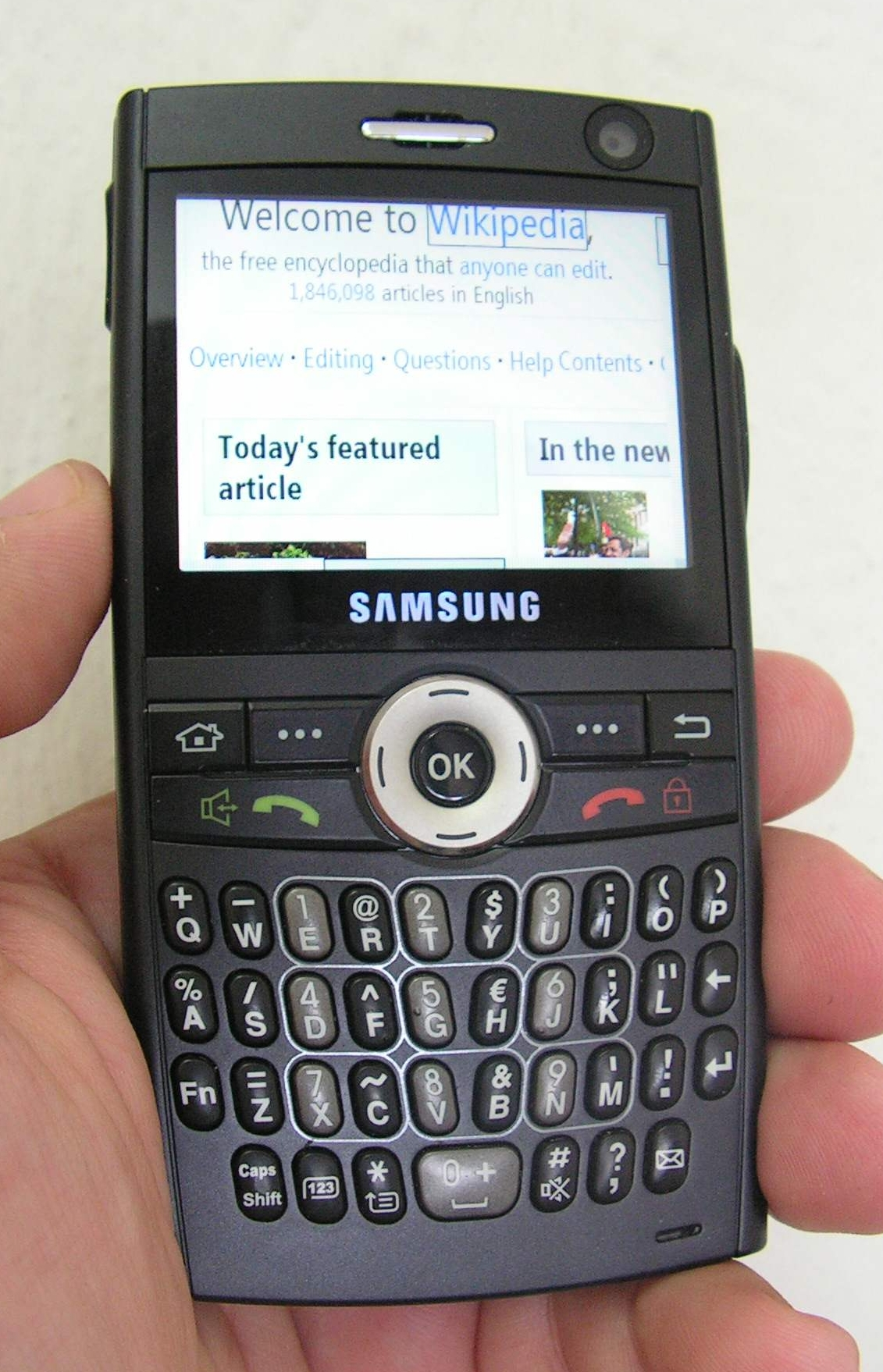
- Manufacturer: Samsung Electronics
- Availability by region: December 2006
- Compatible networks: HSDPA, GSM 900/1800/1900, HSDPA, EDGE, GPRS
- Form factor: bar
- Dimensions: 113×59×11.8 mm (4.45×2.32×0.46 in)
- Weight: 105 g (4 oz)
- Operating system: Windows Mobile 5/6
- CPU: 220 MHz Texas Instruments OMAP 1710
- Memory: 192 MB
- Removable storage: MicroSD
- Battery: 3.7 Volt Lithium-ion, 1,200 mAh
- Rear camera: 1.3 megapixel
- Display: 320 x 240 px, 65k colors
- Connectivity: Wi-Fi b/g, Bluetooth 2.0, USB 1.1
- Data inputs: QWERTY/AZERTY Keyboard, thumb-wheel

The Samsung SGH-i600, also marketed as Ultra Messaging is a smartphone with a QWERTY keyboard, developed by Samsung Electronics running Windows Mobile 5 Smartphone Edition or Windows Mobile 6.0 Standard Edition, released in late 2006. It features HSDPA, Wi-Fi, and Bluetooth connectivity, a 2.3-inch screen with a resolution of 320 × 240 and 65k colors, and a 1.3 megapixel digital camera, with a small curved mirror for self-portraits. It has a microSD memory card expansion port which accepts up to 2 GB cards.

It is similar in design to the Samsung Blackjack (SGH-i607), which is available in the United States on the AT&T network. The SGH-i600 was available through service providers in Europe, but only SIM-free in the U.S.

== Specifications ==
Specifications from the Samsung website:

- Screen size: 2.3 inches
- Screen resolution: 320 x 240 pixels
- Input method: QWERTY/AZERTY Keyboard and thumb-wheel
- Operating System: Windows Mobile 5.0 (upgrade to 6 was available until 31 October 2008)
- Processor: 220 MHz Texas Instruments OMAP 1710
- Storage: External microSD slot
- Flash Memory: 128 MB RAM, 128 MB ROM
- Modes: Tri-band GSM 900, 1800, and 1900
- Data connection: 3G (HSDPA) and 2G (EDGE and GPRS)
- Wi-Fi 802.11 b/g
- Bluetooth 2.0 (A2DP, AVRCP)
- USB 1.1
- 1.3 megapixel camera that can take photographs and videos
  - 2X digital zoom
  - Self timer
  - Multi shot
  - Brightness level adjustment
- Video playback: H.263, H.264, MP4, WMV
- Audio playback: MP3, AAC, AAC+, WMA, WAV
- Battery: Removable 3.7 Volt Lithium-ion, 1,200 mAh
  - Talk time: GSM 4.75 hours, WCDMA 2.5 hours
  - Standby: GSM 380 hours, WCDMA 345 hours
- Size: 113 mm × 59 mm × 11.8 mm
- Weight: 105 grams

== See also ==
- Samsung Ultra Edition
