= Mission statement (disambiguation) =

A mission statement is a summary of an organization's values, philosophies or goals.

Mission statement may also refer to:

- "Mission Statement" (song), 2010, by Stone Sour
- "Mission Statement" ("Weird Al" Yankovic song), 2014

== See also ==
- Personal statement, an alternative name for a college application essay
