= Jake Black =

Jake Black may refer to:

- Jake Black, member of the English electronic band Alabama 3
- Jake Black, American snowboarder in the 2015 Winter Universiade men's slopestyle

== See also ==
- Jack Black (disambiguation)
- Jacob Black, fictional character in the Twilight novel series
