= Do Me a Favor (song) =

Single by Stone Sour

from the album House of Gold & Bones – Part 2
- Released: February 12, 2013
- Genre: Alternative metal; post-grunge
- Length: 4:06
- Label: Roadrunner
- Songwriters: Roy Mayorga; Josh Rand; Jim Root; Corey Taylor
- Producer: David Bottrill

Stone Sour singles chronology
"Gone Sovereign/Absolute Zero" (2012)	"Do Me a Favor" (2013)	"Tired" (2013)

"Do Me a Favor" is a song by American rock band Stone Sour, released on February 12, 2013 as the lead-off single from House of Gold & Bones – Part 2. It contains a reprise of "A Rumor of Skin" from the first part of the album.

== Background ==
Lead vocalist Corey Taylor suggested that while a single for "Part 2" would be the next release, there would still be more singles from "Part 1". He gave a preview of what to expect from the song:

It's quite aggressive, and actually the label asked me if I would go in and tame stuff down and I was like, 'No.' I'm not doing that. This is going out the way it is and I'm not gonna touch it up. I'm not gonna have people looking for a song that doesn't exist. This is the way it is on the album, that's the way it's going to be when we put it out to radio.

Taylor noted:

We're thinking about that. Once "Do Me a Favor" kinda does its thing, we'll probably go back to "Part 1" and find something there. It's a good problem to have, to be honest. There's so many great songs it's kinda hard to choose. We kinda can do whatever we want right now. Obviously with "Absolute Zero" going number one we were like, 'All right! That's really awesome!,' just one more stripe on our shoulder.

Taylor also told:

Not next year but 2014 we are plotting and planning a world tour that is very special, where we do two nights in one place. We play "Part 1" top to bottom, the next night "Part 2" top to bottom involving a pretty elaborate stage thing that we're cooking up now. And once we do that, we're gonna film everything and try to put together a very comprehensive DVD set.

== Music video ==
The animated video for "Do Me a Favor" was directed by Phil Mucci and was released through their official YouTube channel on March 27. Corey Taylor said that it features all the characters from the story: Human, Allen, Black John, Numbers and Peckinpah.

== Track listing ==
iTunes single / Promo CD single UK
No.	Title	Length
1.	"Do Me a Favor"	3:44

Promo CD single Finland
No.	Title	Length
1.	"Do Me a Favor"	3:45

== Chart positions ==
Chart (2013)	Peak position
US Billboard Mainstream Rock	4
