= Samsung BlackJack =

Cell phone model

Samsung SGH-i607 (BlackJack)
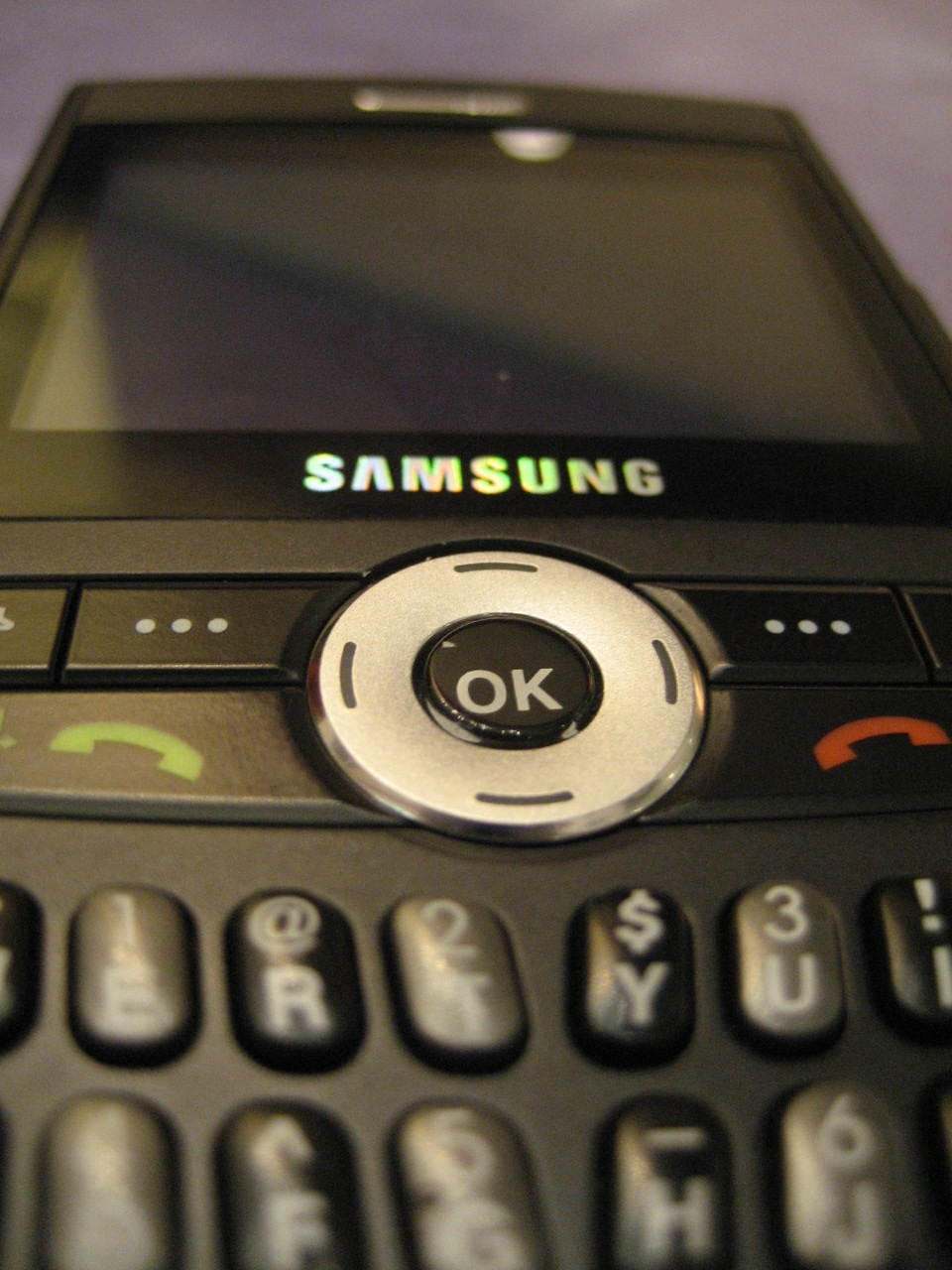
- Manufacturer: Samsung Electronics
- Series: Blackjack
- Successor: BlackJack II
- Compatible networks: GSM 850/900/1800/1900, UMTS, HSDPA, EDGE, and GPRS
- Form factor: Bar
- Dimensions: 4.45" × 2.32" × 0.4"
- Weight: 3.5
- Operating system: Windows Mobile 5.0
- CPU: 220 MHz Texas Instruments OMAP 1710
- Memory: 64 MB RAM, 128 MB ROM
- Removable storage: microSD
- Battery: 3.7 Volt Lithium-ion, 1,200 mAhSize: 4.45×2.32×0.4 inches
- Rear camera: 1.3 megapixel
- Display: 320 x 240 px, 2.25 inches
- Connectivity: Bluetooth 2.0
- Data inputs: QWERTY keypad

The Samsung SGH-i607, marketed as BlackJack, is a smartphone with a QWERTY keyboard released in 2006, that was available through AT&T in the United States and Telstra in Australia. On the other hand, the Samsung i600 was the model offered in Europe using different 3G frequencies.

== Brand controversy ==
In January 2007 Research In Motion, creators of the BlackBerry handhelds, filed suit in United States federal court claiming the BlackJack trademark was too similar to the BlackBerry mark. They alleged that Samsung had named their smartphone with a word beginning with "Black" just to mislead the customers that would come to the cellphone stores with the intention to purchase a BlackBerry. A month later the two parties settled out of court. In January 2008, Rogers Wireless and Fido Solutions released the Blackjack II in Canada under the name Jack.

== Hardware defect ==
For handsets manufactured between November 2006 and February 2007, there is a known defect in the antenna assembly, causing a large number of dropped calls.

== Successor ==
The successor to the BlackJack was the Samsung BlackJack II. It was available in the U.S. for AT&T and in Canada for Rogers.

== Awards ==
- Award Winner from CTIA (Cellular Telecommunications Industry Association). "Best hardware from Smartphone/PDA category."
- Winner of comparison review from 'Samsung BlackJack and RIM BlackBerry 8800' by CNET.

== Specifications ==
Specifications from the Samsung website:

- Screen resolution: 320 × 240 px, 2.25 inches
- Input method: QWERTY keypad
- Operating System: Windows Mobile 5.0 (upgrade to 6 is available)
- Processor: 220 MHz Texas Instruments OMAP 1710
- Storage: External microSD slot
- Flash Memory: 64 MB RAM, 128 MB ROM
- Modes: Quad-band GSM (850, 900, 1800, and 1900)
- Data connection: 3G (UMTS and HSDPA) and 2G (EDGE and GPRS)
- Bluetooth 2.0
- 1.3 megapixel camera that can take photographs and videos
  - Picture resolutions: 1280 × 960, 640 × 480, 320 × 240, and 176 × 144
  - Video resolutions: 320 × 240, and 176 × 144
  - 2× digital zoom
  - Self timer
  - Brightness level adjustment
- Plays MP3, WMV, MP4 and 3GP media formats
- Battery: Removable 3.7 Volt Lithium-ion, 1,200 mAh, up to 5.5 hours of talk time and up to 11 days of standby
- Size: 4.45×2.32×0.4 inches
- Weight: 3.5 ounces
