= Gone Sovereign/Absolute Zero =

Single by Stone Sour

from the album House of Gold & Bones – Part 1
- Released: August 24, 2012
- Genre: Alternative metal
- Length: 4:03 ("Gone Sovereign"); 3:49 ("Absolute Zero")
- Label: Roadrunner
- Producer: David Bottrill

Stone Sour singles chronology
"Hesitate" (2011)	"Gone Sovereign/Absolute Zero" (2012)	"Do Me a Favor" (2013)

"Gone Sovereign/Absolute Zero" is a double-single from American rock band Stone Sour, released as the first single from their fourth album House of Gold & Bones – Part 1.

"Absolute Zero"'s reprise is featured on the track "The House of Gold & Bones" from the second part of the album.

== Music videos ==
In "Absolute Zero", the main character is stuck in some sort of other-worldly realm. Within this realm, two versions of Stone Sour perform the track throughout the area; one colored grey and the other colored gold. The man is presented with a choice, his body getting twisted and warped as he struggles to make a truly impossible decision. Frontman Corey Taylor said:

"Absolute Zero" is the anti-hero anthem of House of Gold & Bones – Part 1. It essentially lets you know that the hero isn't perfect, but he will do whatever is necessary. The video is loosely based on the fact that in the short story, the hero ends up in a very strange world and he has to figure out what's going on and what he'll do."

== Track listing ==
Free download single (2012)
No.	Title	Length
1.	"Gone Sovereign/Absolute Zero"	7:40

iTunes single (2012)
No.	Title	Length
1.	"Gone Sovereign"	4:03
2.	"Absolute Zero"	3:49

UK promotional single (2012)
No.	Title	Length
1.	"Absolute Zero" (clean edit)	3:50
2.	"Gone Sovereign"	3:49
3.	"Gone Sovereign/Absolute Zero" (Album Version)	7:39

Scandinavia promotional single (2012)
No.	Title	Length
1.	"Absolute Zero" (clean)	3:51
2.	"Absolute Zero" (album version)	3:50
3.	"Gone Sovereign" (album version)	3:50
4.	"Gone Sovereign/Absolute Zero" (clean)	7:40
5.	"Gone Sovereign/Absolute Zero" (album version)	7:40

Digital download single (2019)
No.	Title	Length
1.	"Absolute Zero" (live)	3:59

== Personnel ==
- Corey Taylor – lead vocals
- Jim Root – lead and rhythm guitar (first and third solo)
- Josh Rand – rhythm and lead guitar (second solo)
- Johny Chow – bass
- Roy Mayorga – drums

== Charts ==
=== Weekly charts ===
Weekly chart performance for "Absolute Zero"
Chart (2012)	Peak position
Canada Rock (Billboard)	19
US Hot Rock & Alternative Songs (Billboard)	26
US Rock & Alternative Airplay (Billboard)	13

=== Year-end charts ===
2012 year-end chart performance for "Absolute Zero"
Chart (2012)	Position
US Hot Rock Songs (Billboard)	75

2013 year-end chart performance for "Absolute Zero"
Chart (2013)	Position
US Rock Airplay (Billboard)	50

== Certifications ==
Certifications for "Absolute Zero"
Region	Certification	Certified units/sales
Australia (ARIA)	Gold	35,000^{‡}
Canada (Music Canada)	Gold	40,000^{‡}
^{‡} Sales+streaming figures based on certification alone.
