= Samsung BlackJack II =

Cell phone model

Samsung SGH-i617 (BlackJack II), SGH-i616 (Samsung Jack) in Canada
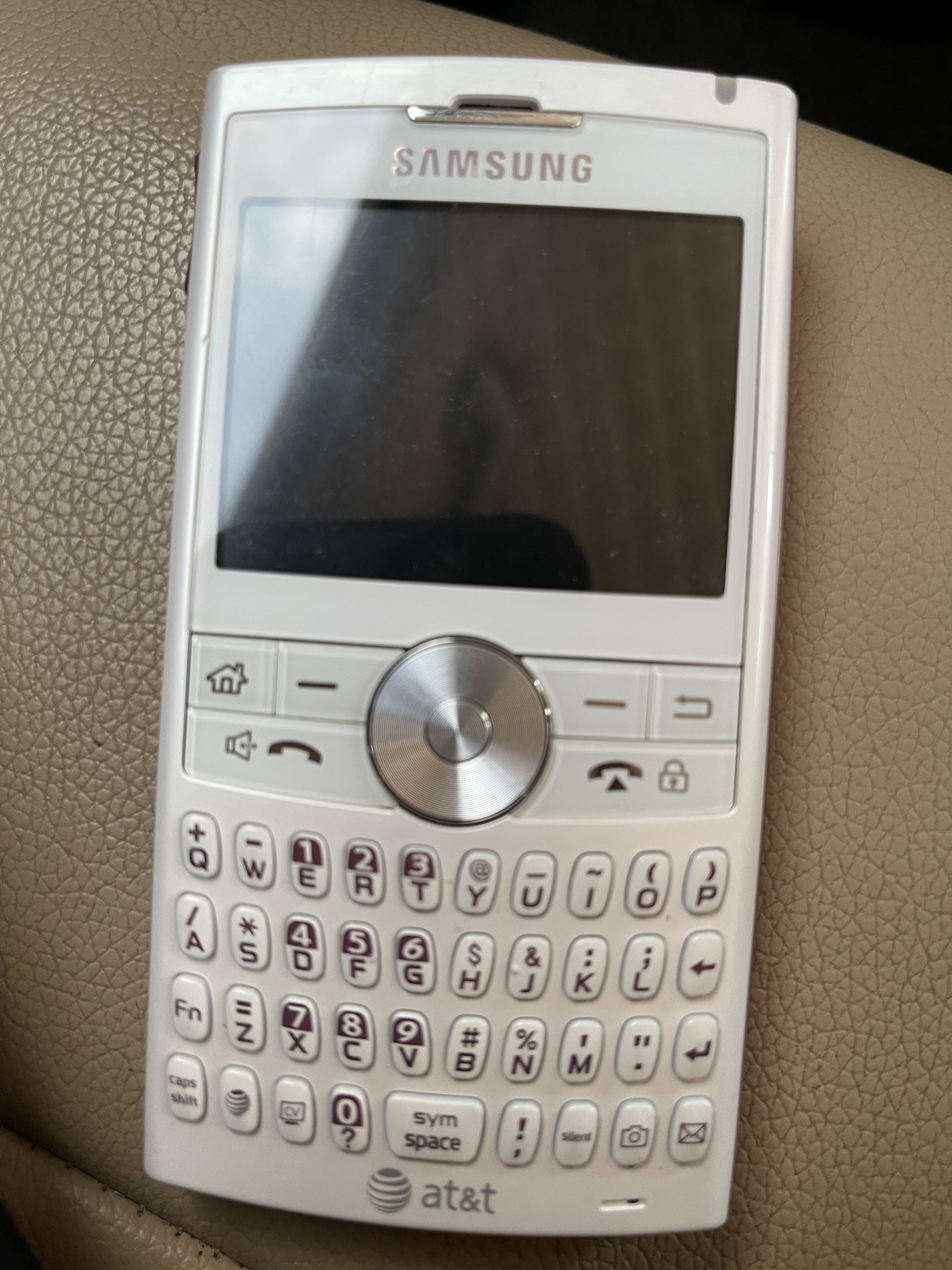
- Manufacturer: Samsung Electronics
- Series: Blackjack
- Predecessor: BlackJack
- Successor: Samsung jack or Samsung Epix
- Compatible networks: GSM 850/900/1800/1900, UMTS, HSDPA, EDGE, GPRS
- Form factor: Bar
- Dimensions: 4.4" x 2.3" x 0.4"
- Weight: 3.52 oz (100 g)
- Operating system: Windows Mobile 6 Standard Edition
- CPU: 260 MHz Texas Instruments OMAP 2420
- Memory: 128 MB RAM, 256 MB ROM
- Removable storage: microSD
- Battery: 3.7 Volt Lithium-ion, 1,700 mAh
- Rear camera: 2.0 megapixel
- Display: 320 x 240 pixels, 65K color TFT-LCD
- Connectivity: Bluetooth
- Data inputs: QWERTY keypad with backlights and jog wheel

The Samsung BlackJack II, or Samsung SGH-i617, is a smartphone that was available through AT&T in the United States. It is the successor to the Samsung BlackJack. Canadian version, SGH-i616 is marketed as "Samsung Jack" by Rogers and Fido. The phone has since been succeeded by the Samsung Epix.

The phone comes in black, burgundy, blue, & pink.

== Specifications ==
Specifications from the Samsung website:

- Screen size: 2.4 inches
- Screen resolution: 320 x 240 pixels, 65K color TFT display
- Input method: QWERTY keypad with backlight and jog wheel
- Operating System: Windows Mobile 6 Standard Edition (can be updated to Windows Mobile 6.1)
- Processor: 260 MHz Texas Instruments OMAP 1710
- Storage: External microSD slot, supports up to 4 GB SDHC cards
- Voice Commands (When Updated to Windows Mobile 6.1)
- Flash Memory: 128 MB RAM, 256 MB ROM
- Modes: Quad-band GSM (850, 900, 1800, and 1900)
- Data connection: 3G (UMTS and HSDPA at 850,1900,2100 MHz. Canadian version, SGH-i616 does not support UMTS 2100, only 850/1900, which makes 3G speeds not accessible in Europe) and 2G (EDGE and GPRS)
  - AGPS on-board
- Bluetooth 2.0
- 2.0 megapixel camera that can take photographs and videos
  - Multiple resolutions: 1600 x 1200, 640 x 480, 320 x 240, and 176 x 144
  - 4X digital zoom
  - Self timer
  - Multi-shot
  - Brightness level adjustment
  - No flash
- Supported video formats: MPEG4, H.263, WMV
- Battery: Removable 3.7 Volt Lithium-ion, 1,700 mAh, up to 7 hours of talk time and up to 14 days of standby
- Size: 4.4 x 2.3 x 0.4 inches
- Weight: 3.52 ounces

== Unpublished features ==
- Upper indicator-light color meanings:
  - Purple: message sent/received
  - Blue: Bluetooth activated/deactivated/Alarm
  - Amber: problem with connection
  - Red: charging or battery low
  - Green: fully charged
- Home Screen Status Indicators:
  - 3G: connected to 3G service
  - E: connected to EDGE service
  - G: connected to WAP service
  - Wi-fi: Yes "Good quality"

== Samsung Jack ==
The Samsung Jack, or Samsung SGH-i637, is a smartphone available through AT&T in the United States. It is the successor to the Samsung BlackJack II. The phone comes in metallic gray.
