= Say You'll Haunt Me =

Single by Stone Sour

from the album Audio Secrecy
- Released: July 6, 2010
- Recorded: 2010 at Blackbird Studios in Nashville, Tennessee, United States
- Genre: Post-grunge; alternative metal
- Length: 4:40 (music video); 4:24 (album version); 4:02 (radio edit)
- Label: Roadrunner
- Songwriter: Corey Taylor
- Producer: Nick Raskulinecz

Stone Sour singles chronology
"Mission Statement" (2010)	"Say You'll Haunt Me" (2010)	"Digital (Did You Tell)" (2010)

Music video
- "Say You'll Haunt Me" on YouTube

"Say You'll Haunt Me" is the second single from rock band Stone Sour's third album Audio Secrecy which was released on September 7, 2010 via Roadrunner Records. The song was released to the public on July 6, 2010. The song has received radio airplay on multiple major rock and metal stations nationally in the US. The digital single was released through Amazon and iTunes on July 20, 2010.

== Background ==
Frontman Corey Taylor told The Pulse of Radio, that it took him a while to warm up to “Say You’ll Haunt Me” during the making of the record. “It was one of those songs, that I didn’t really feel until it was finished,” he said. “I enjoyed the lyrics, but I wasn’t sure about the music. I’d come in and I’d sing it, and I put my heart into it, because the lyrics are about my wife and how I feel about my wife, and then I left. And I came back and they [the rest of the band] had just made it incredible. Now I can’t get it out of my head.”

== Music video ==
The band has shot a music video, directed by Paul R. Brown. The video premiered on July 27, 2010.

The video begins with a car (1972 Plymouth Barracuda) pulling into a creepy alleyway with Corey Taylor being pulled out of the trunk by his bandmates. He is then lead upstairs to be strapped into a chair and interrogated by a woman (Joanna Moskawa) who seems to have an aggression towards him. As this is happening, ghostly images of the band perform in front of each member, the video also features these images solo inside an abandoned warehouse including Taylor. Taylor is then blindfolded and then a weird screen is brought out. Corey then walks into the room from the shadows, with a shaved head, wearing a suit and sunglasses. He takes the sunglasses off and then the blindfold is removed, revealing the woman from before.

At the end of the solo and the final "everything to" shaved Corey presses the button and the other Corey is then seen singing on the screen. The lady panics from this sight and the rest of the band have smiles on their faces. At the end of the video the band leaves the lady tied. Right before it fades to black, the screen says "What did you see?" This was part of a contest that the band held to see the concept of the video, which had a code which read "I am you" which explains the fact Corey was replaced with the woman.

The video uses the album version, not the short radio edit.

== Track listing ==
iTunes single / Promo CD single US #1
No.	Title	Length
1.	"Say You'll Haunt Me"	4:24

Promo CD single Europe
No.	Title	Length
1.	"Say You'll Haunt Me" (radio edit)	4:03
2.	"Say You'll Haunt Me" (album version)	4:24

Promo CD single cardboard sleeve US
No.	Title	Length
1.	"Say You'll Haunt Me" (radio edit)	3:55
2.	"Say You'll Haunt Me" (album version)	4:24

Promo CD single US #2
No.	Title	Length
1.	"Say You'll Haunt Me"
2.	"Mission Statement"

== Chart positions ==
In the week of October 2, 2010, "Say You'll Haunt Me" reached number one on both the U.S. Billboard Rock Songs chart and the Mainstream Rock Tracks chart. In doing so, it became Stone Sour's first single to reach number one on the Rock Songs chart and their second, after "Through Glass", to reach number one on the Mainstream Rock Tracks chart.

=== Weekly charts ===
Chart (2010–11)	Peak position
Canada Rock (Billboard)	3
UK Singles (The Official Charts Company)	198
UK Rock & Metal (OCC)	7
US Bubbling Under Hot 100 (Billboard)	10
US Hot Rock & Alternative Songs (Billboard)	1

=== Year-end charts ===
Chart (2010)	Position
US Hot Rock & Alternative Songs (Billboard)	20
Chart (2011)	Position
US Hot Rock & Alternative Songs (Billboard)	12

=== Decade-end charts ===
Chart (2010–2019)	Position
US Hot Rock Songs (Billboard)	24

== See also ==
- List of Rock Songs number-one singles
- List of Billboard Mainstream Rock number-one songs of the 2010s

== Rock Band music gaming platform ==
It was made available to download on January 18, 2011 for use in the Rock Band 3 music gaming platform in both Basic rhythm, and PRO mode which utilizes real guitar / bass guitar, and MIDI compatible electronic drum kits / keyboards in addition to vocals.
