= Tired (Stone Sour song) =

Single by Stone Sour

from the album House of Gold & Bones – Part 1
- Released: August 14, 2013
- Genre: Hard rock; alternative metal
- Length: 4:11
- Label: Roadrunner
- Songwriters: Roy Mayorga; Josh Rand; Jim Root; Corey Taylor
- Producer: David Bottrill

Stone Sour singles chronology
"Do Me a Favor" (2013)	"Tired" (2013)	"Song #3" (2017)

Music video
- "Tired" on YouTube

"Tired" is a song by American rock band Stone Sour, released on August 14, 2013 as the second single from their fourth album House of Gold & Bones – Part 1. The song reached No. 1 on the Billboard Mainstream Rock chart.

== Music video ==
The music video was released through their official YouTube channel on August 19, 2013.

== Track listing ==
SoundCloud single
No.	Title	Length
1.	"Tired" (acoustic)	3:34

== Chart positions ==
Chart (2013)	Peak position
US Hot Rock & Alternative Songs (Billboard)	50
US Mainstream Rock (Billboard)	1
US Rock & Alternative Airplay (Billboard)	13
