= Audio Secrecy =

Studio album by Stone Sour
- Released: September 7, 2010
- Recorded: 2010
- Studios: Blackbird (Nashville, Tennessee)
- Genres: Alternative metal; post-grunge; alternative rock
- Length: 54:23
- Label: Roadrunner
- Producer: Nick Raskulinecz

Stone Sour chronology
Live in Moscow (2007)	Audio Secrecy (2010)	House of Gold & Bones – Part 1 (2012)

Singles from Audio Secrecy
- 1. "Mission Statement" Released: June 21, 2010; 2. "Say You'll Haunt Me" Released: July 6, 2010; 3. "Digital (Did You Tell)" Released: November 21, 2010 (UK, US, Japan); 4. "Hesitate" Released: February 11, 2011 (Germany, France, Italy)

Audio Secrecy is the third studio album by American rock band Stone Sour. It was recorded and produced by the band and Nick Raskulinecz at Blackbird Studios in Nashville, Tennessee. On June 10, the band released a free download of "Mission Statement", which was later released as a single on iTunes. The first official single, "Say You'll Haunt Me", however, was released on July 6, 2010.

Audio Secrecy is also the first album by the band to not feature a 'Parental Advisory' sticker and is dedicated to Slipknot bassist Paul Gray, who had died earlier in 2010. It is also the band's last album to feature bassist Shawn Economaki, and their first album to feature the same members from the previous album.

== Critical reception ==
Professional ratings
Review scores
Source	Rating
About.com	3.5/5 stars
Allmusic	4/5 stars
Associated Press	positive
Evigshed	10/10
Kerrang!	3/5 stars
Rock Sound	9/10
411mania.com	7.0/10

Audio Secrecy received generally positive reviews from music critics. Tim Grierson of About.com compared the band to Slipknot stating that Stone Sour delivers loud and powerful love songs and that the album in whole displayed Corey Taylor's flexibility in music. Gregory Heaney of Allmusic praised Taylor's voice stating that he has made full use of his voice "from guttural to soaring". He also related the "chugging guitar" work of the album to that of Deftones.

Lenny Vowels, a senior critic of 411mania.com awarded the album seven out of ten stars summarizing his review by stating "Stone Sour's newest record does seem to yearn for new heights, but for some reason can't quite reach them. The mood is definitely darker than their previous two albums, though that doesn't mean it's better. Basically, what's good on the album is great, and while nothing's bad, the rest doesn't come off as anything special either. In the band's personal history, I'd rank it above Come What(ever) May overall, but their self-titled album still leads the pack. Either way, this record is worth having if you're a fan of the band, but don't expect much in the way of new."

== Sales ==
Audio Secrecy debuted in the top 10 in various countries. In the US, it sold 46,000 copies in its first week and debuted at No. 6 on the Billboard 200.

== Track listing ==
All lyrics by Corey Taylor. Music written by Stone Sour

No.	Title	Length
1.	"Audio Secrecy"	1:44
2.	"Mission Statement"	3:51
3.	"Digital (Did You Tell)"	4:01
4.	"Say You'll Haunt Me"	4:25
5.	"Dying"	3:02
6.	"Let's Be Honest"	3:45
7.	"Unfinished"	3:11
8.	"Hesitate"	4:17
9.	"Nylon 6/6"	3:39
10.	"Miracles"	4:08
11.	"Pieces"	4:31
12.	"The Bitter End"	3:34
13.	"Imperfect"	4:23
14.	"Threadbare"	5:47
Total length:		54:23

Japanese Bonus Tracks
No.	Title	Length
15.	"Hate Not Gone"	3:51
Total length:		58:14

Special Edition Bonus Tracks
No.	Title	Length
15.	"Hate Not Gone"	3:51
16.	"Anna"	3:30
17.	"Home Again"	3:54
18.	"Saturday Morning" (US iTunes pre-order/German iTunes bonus track)	3:15
Total length:		68:54

DVD (The Making of Audio Secrecy)
No.	Title	Length
1.	"Intro"	1:03
2.	"Mission Statement"	2:10
3.	"Audio Secrecy"	2:38
4.	"The New Album"	5:08
5.	"Scratch Vocals"	4:45
6.	"Fan Questions #1"	2:27
7.	"In the Studio"	6:33
8.	"Drums"	2:10
9.	"Josh's Gear"	2:10
10.	"Fan Questions #2"	3:55
11.	"Randomness"	3:33
12.	"The Songs"	3:22
13.	"Outro"	2:16
14.	"Mission Statement (Live at Download 2010)"	4:04
15.	"Made of Scars (Live at Download 2010)"	4:27
16.	"Hell & Consequences (Live at Download 2010)"	3:31

=== Unreleased songs ===
At least two more songs were created during the Audio Secrecy recording sessions. One of them is called "The Pessimist". The song is mentioned in the official Stone Sour biography. "For guitarist Josh Rand, the track 'The Pessimist' holds a special significance. 'It's the heaviest song we've done up to this point. I spent a day and a half studying the Hindu scale for the lead. The guitar solo for that song has a very Eastern sound.' The song sees Rand shredding with a precise, powerful solo that's melodic and metallic. All the while, it preserves a unique feel." "The Pessimist" is on the soundtrack of Transformers: Dark of the Moon as an iTunes exclusive track. It is also available on their Facebook page as a free download. The second, "Full of Empty", was released as part of the album's 15th anniversary re-release, including new lyrics, vocals and guitar tracks that were recorded by Taylor, Rand and Root in 2025. This version retains the full Audio Secrecy-era lineup of Stone Sour.

The opening line of "The Pessimist", "Half alive and stark-raving free", became the first lines of Slipknot's song "Custer" off their album .5: The Gray Chapter.

There is also a recording of a spoken word by Corey Taylor, simply titled '2010' (as confirmed by Corey Taylor) in the vein of "Omega" and "The Frozen" on the previous records.

== Personnel ==
Stone Sour

- Corey Taylor − lead vocals
- James Root − lead guitar
- Josh Rand − rhythm guitar
- Shawn Economaki − bass
- Roy Mayorga − drums, percussion

Additional personnel

- Steve Blacke − strings arrangement, strings on track 8

Technical personnel

- Nick Raskulinecz − producer, engineering
- Ted Jensen − mastering
- Chris Lord-Alge − mixing
- Randy Staub − mixing
- John Nicholson − drum tech
- Zach Blackstone − assistant mixing
- Paul Fig − engineering
- Nathan Yarborough − assistant engineering
- P.R. Brown − art direction, design, photography

== Charts ==
Chart (2010)	Peak position
Australian Albums Chart	6
Austrian Albums Chart	5
Belgian Albums Chart (Flanders)	28
Belgian Albums Chart (Wallonia)	31
Canadian Albums Chart	6
Dutch Albums Chart	16
Finnish Albums Chart	23
French Albums Chart	29
German Albums Chart	3
German LP-Downloads Chart	6
Greek Albums Chart	24
Irish Albums Chart	19
Italian Albums Chart	89
Japanese Albums Chart	16
New Zealand Albums Chart	12
Spanish Albums Chart	94
Scottish Albums	8
Swedish Albums Chart	10
Swiss Albums Chart	7
UK Albums Chart	6
US Billboard 200	6
US Alternative Albums	2
US Digital Albums	5
US Hard Rock Albums	2
US Rock Albums	2
