= John Black =

John Black may refer to:

== Sportspeople ==
- J. T. "Blondy" Black (1920–2000), American football halfback
- John Black (baseball) (1890–1962), Major League Baseball first baseman
- John Black (footballer, born 1900) (1900–1993), Scottish footballer
- John Black (footballer, born 1914) (1914–1992), Scottish footballer
- John Black (footballer, born 1957), Scottish footballer
- John Black (rugby union) (born 1951), New Zealand rugby union player
- John Black (sport shooter) (1882–1924), Canadian Olympic sport shooter
- John Black (golfer) (1879–1963), Scottish golfer

== Politicians ==
- John Black (U.S. senator) (1800–1854), Mississippi judge and politician
- John Black (Lower Canada politician) (c. 1764–after 1819), shipbuilder and politician in Lower Canada
- John Black (New Brunswick politician) (1856–1936), lawyer and politician in New Brunswick, Canada
- John Black (merchant) (c. 1765–1823), merchant and politician in New Brunswick
- John Black (Georgia politician) (1933–2017), member of the Georgia State Senate
- John Black (Missouri politician) (born 1952), member of the Missouri House of Representatives
- John Black (Wisconsin politician) (1830–1899), Milwaukee mayor, 1878–1880
- John C. Black (1839–1915), U.S. Congressman and soldier
- John Black (Australian politician) (born 1952), Australian Senator
- John Wycliffe Black (1862–1951), Liberal MP for Harborough, Leicestershire, 1923–1924
- John H. Black in 158th New York State Legislature

== Characters ==
- John Black (Days of Our Lives), a fictional character on the NBC soap opera Days of our Lives
- "Ugly John" Black, M*A*S*H
- John Black, character of Age of Empires III Act II
- John Black, character in Babes in Arms

== Other ==
- John Black (martyr) (died 1566), Scottish Roman Catholic martyred on the same night David Rizzio was murdered
- John Black (privateer) (1778–1802), English captain, privateer and survivor of the mutiny on the Lady Shore
- John Black (journalist) (1783–1855), British editor of the Morning Chronicle, 1817–1843
- John Black (Canadian judge) (1817–1879), Scottish-born, judge in Canada and politician in Australia
- John McConnell Black (1855–1951), Australian botanist
- Sir John Black (businessman) (1895–1965), British motor industry executive
- John D. F. Black (1932–2018), American television writer from the 1950s to the 1980s
- John Black (cryptographer), American computer science professor
- John Black (director) (born 1940), retired British TV director
- John Black (clergyman) (1818–1882), Presbyterian clergyman who emigrated from Scotland to the Red River Colony
- John Black (composer) (c. 1520–1587), Scottish singer and composer
- John Nicholson Black (1922–2018), principal of Bedford College, University of London, 1971–1981
- J. B. Black (1883–1964), Scottish historian
- J. R. Black (1826–1880), Scottish publisher, journalist, writer, photographer, and singer
- John Melton Black (1830–1919), pioneer of Townsville, Queensland, Australia
- John Sutherland Black (1846–1923), Scottish biblical scholar
- John Logan Black (1830–1902), Confederate Army officer
- John D. Black (1883–1960), American economist
- John Janvier Black (1837–1909), American surgeon and writer

== See also ==
- The Soul of John Black, an American soul group
- John Gotti (1940–2002), nicknamed "Black John", U.S. mobster
- Black Jack (disambiguation)
- Jack Black (disambiguation)
