= Digital (Did You Tell) =

Single by Stone Sour

from the album Audio Secrecy
- Released: November 21, 2010
- Genre: Alternative metal; post-grunge
- Length: 3:24
- Label: Roadrunner
- Songwriter(s): Corey Taylor
- Producer(s): Nick Raskulinecz

Stone Sour singles chronology
"Say You'll Haunt Me" (2010)	"Digital (Did You Tell)" (2010)	"Hesitate" (2010)

"Digital (Did You Tell)" is the second single from Stone Sour's third album, Audio Secrecy. The two-track promotional single was released strictly to radio in 2011.

== Background ==
Regarding the lyrical inspiration for "Digital (Did You Tell)", Corey Taylor said:

Lyrically, it's basically about the isolation of the digital age where more and more people are afraid to come out of their bubble, more and more people are afraid to come out of their cocoon. They'd rather sit in front of an electric screen and pour their hate or pour their emotions anonymously into the world. And there's nothing cathartic about that; there's nothing healthy about that. And it's basically [just saying], 'Take a break, unplug, live your life for a while. Get out and experience life while you can because it could be gone [snaps fingers] like that.

== Music video ==
The video was directed by Paul R. Brown, who previously worked with Stone Sour on the "30/30-150", "Say You'll Haunt Me" and "Hesistate" videos.

== Track listing ==
iTunes single UK, US, Japan, Australia
No.	Title	Length
1.	"Digital (Did You Tell)" (radio edit)	3:24

Promo CD single UK and Netherlands
No.	Title	Length
1.	"Digital (Did You Tell)" (radio edit)	3:22

Promo CD single United States
No.	Title	Length
1.	"Digital (Did You Tell)" (radio edit)	3:22
2.	"Digital (Did You Tell)" (album version)	3:58

Promo CD single Denmark
No.	Title	Length
1.	"Digital (Did You Tell)" (radio edit)	3:25
2.	"Digital (Did You Tell)" (album version)	4:00

== Chart positions ==
Chart (2010)	Peak position
US Mainstream Rock Tracks (Billboard)	14
