= Hesitate (Stone Sour song) =

2011 single by Stone Sour

Single by Stone Sour

from the album Audio Secrecy
- Released: February 11, 2011
- Genre: Alternative rock
- Length: 3:59
- Label: Roadrunner
- Songwriter(s): Corey Taylor
- Producer(s): Nick Raskulinecz

Stone Sour singles chronology
"Digital (Did You Tell)" (2010)	"Hesitate" (2011)	"Gone Sovereign/Absolute Zero" (2012)

"Hesitate" is the third single from Stone Sour's third album Audio Secrecy. The one-track promo single for the song, released strictly to radio in 2010. The CD comes in a thin paper sleeve with no artwork.

== Background ==
"Hesitate" is a power ballad, in the same vein as "Bother" and "Through Glass". Taylor's voice flies over a steadily building mid-tempo track that blends electric and acoustic guitars over a spare rhythm section.

When the full band joins Taylor's vocals, the song stays much more restrained than a typical power ballad, which allows for greater focus on the heartbreak described in the lyrics:

"Because I see you / But I can't feel you anymore / So go away / I need you but I can't need you anymore / You hesitate / Hesitate."

== Music video ==
The music video for the song "Hesitate" off the band's third full-length Audio Secrecy. Frontman Corey Taylor offers the following explanation behind the concept of the song:

"Hesitate" is "about letting go of something that you want with all your heart that you know is just gonna do nothing but damage to you," he continues. "And it takes a special kind of heart and a special kind of courage to do that."

== Reception ==
Rock Sound said the song was "a truly heartfelt lamentation via tender lyrics that display Taylor's more fragile side yet, although it's one of the album's most touching tracks, it's also one of the biggest sounding, recalling the power ballads of the late 80s."

== Track listing ==
Promo CD single US (2010)
No.	Title	Length
1.	"Hesitate" (radio version)	3:59

Promo CD single Europe (2010)
No.	Title	Length
1.	"Hesitate" (edit)	3:59
2.	"Hesitate" (album version)	4:15

iTunes single (2011)
No.	Title	Length
1.	"Hesitate"	4:16

== Chart positions ==
Chart (2010)	Peak position
US Adult Pop Songs (Billboard)	25
US Alternative Songs (Billboard)	32
US Mainstream Rock Tracks (Billboard)	6
