= Mission Statement (song) =

Single by Stone Sour

from the album Audio Secrecy
- Released: June 21, 2010
- Genre: Alternative metal
- Length: 3:50
- Label: Roadrunner
- Songwriter(s): Corey Taylor
- Producer(s): Nick Raskulinecz

Stone Sour singles chronology
"Zzyzx Rd." (2007)	"Mission Statement" (2010)	"Say You'll Haunt Me" (2010)

"Mission Statement" is a song by American rock band Stone Sour. It was the single preview of their third studio album Audio Secrecy. It was released digitally through iTunes. The band put this single for free download on their website for 72 hours from 10 June to 12 June.

== Track listing ==
iTunes / Free digital download single
No.	Title	Length
1.	"Mission Statement"	3:50

Promo single UK
No.	Title	Length
1.	"Mission Statement"	3:51
