= John Janvier Black =

American surgeon

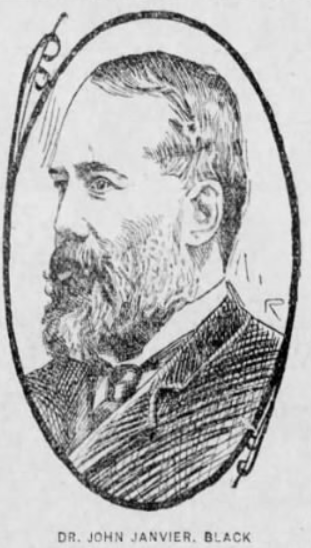
- Born: November 6, 1837; Delaware City
- Died: September 27, 1909 (aged 71); New Castle, Delaware
- Occupations: Surgeon, writer

John Janvier Black (November 6, 1837 - September 27, 1909) was an American surgeon and writer.

== Biography ==
Black was born in Delaware City. He studied at Princeton University and obtained his M.D. from University of Pennsylvania, in 1862. He was resident physician at Blockley Hospital. He worked as a surgeon in New Castle, Delaware. He was President of Delaware Insane Asylum and instituted Delaware State Hospital.

Black was a farmer and fruit-grower. He authored The Cultivation of the Peach and the Pear. As a surgeon on his country rounds of thirty to forty miles he carried out successful operations with limited equipment. He was a member of the College of Physicians of Philadelphia. He married Jeanie Groome Black in 1872, they had two children. His dieting book Eating to Live was positively reviewed. The California State Journal of Medicine noted that "we have been well impressed with Dr. Black's work; physicians may read it with advantage to themselves and their patients."

Black helped found the National Tuberculosis Association in 1904. He was a founding member of the Delaware Anti-Tuberculosis Society in 1907 and served as president. He died of uremia.

== Publications ==
- The Cultivation of the Peach and the Pear (1886)
- Forty Years in the Medical Profession, 1858-1898 (1900)
- Eating to Live (1906)
- Consumptives in Delaware (1902)
