= Black Jack, Kentucky =

Unincorporated community in Kentucky, United States

Black Jack
- Unincorporated community
- Location within the state of Kentucky Black Jack (the United States)
- Coordinates: 36°46′4″N 86°30′46″W
- Country: United States
- State: Kentucky
- County: Simpson
- Elevation: 696 ft (212 m)
- Time zone: UTC-5 (Eastern (EST))
  - Summer (DST): UTC-4 (EDT)
- GNIS feature ID: 507516

Black Jack is an unincorporated community within Simpson County, Kentucky, United States.
