= Jack Black (disambiguation) =

Jack Black (born 1969) is an American actor and musician.

Jack Black may also refer to:

- Jack Black (author) (1871–1932), Canadian-born American author and hobo
- Jack Black (rat catcher), Victorian-era rat catcher
- Jack Black (Viz), a character in the adult comic Viz
- Jack Black (died 1786), nickname of black Welsh gardener John Ystumllyn
- Jack Black, a brand of luxury men's skin and hair care products owned by Edgewell Personal Care

== See also ==
- Black Jack (disambiguation)
- Jake Black (disambiguation)
- John Black (disambiguation)
