= Uncle Valentine =

1925 short story by Willa Cather

- Short story by Willa Cather
- Country: United States
- Language: English
- Genre: Short story

Publication
- Published in: Woman's Home Companion
- Publication type: Women's magazine
- Publication date: February 1925

"Uncle Valentine" is a short story by Willa Cather. It was first published in Woman's Home Companion in February 1925.

== Plot summary ==
A music teacher is giving a lesson to an American girl, who says she has been practising songs by Valentine Ramsay. The teacher says another lady in the room can tell her more about him.

Marjorie explains Valentine was her uncle. One day, her Aunt Charlotte is getting ready for her brother to come back after leaving for Europe subsequent to leaving his wife. She trains the girls to sing for Valentine's arrival. When he first gets there, they have a welcome party at their neighbour's, Bonnie Brae. Later, Valentine explains he left his wife whilst on holiday in Europe because she was only concerned about saving money and did not seem to enjoy life for what it is. A few days later, he goes Christmas shopping with his sister Charlotte. On Christmas Eve, Charlotte throws a party with some neighbours, and Valentine decides to leave the room and play music, where he is joined by Marjorie and eventually Charlotte too.

The following winter and spring Valentine is busy writing new songs and playing and teaching music to the girls. They also take walks in the surrounding valleys. Later, he goes into town for a while, and comes back to say Louise Ireland is leaving Paris and going to travel round the world whilst he wants to stay with them.

The following summer they learn that Belle has sold her house and gone off abroad. Although at first her agent won't disclose who is moving in, they soon find out it is Janet and her new husband Seymour, there to bring up Dickie close to his grandparents. Valentine decides to leave for Europe again. The story ends with noise from works being done on the newly purchased house, jarring the ambience and atmosphere of the rural place.

== Characters ==
- Louise Ireland, a singing teacher in Paris. She was Valentine Ramsay's lover in Paris.
- American student. She says she has been practising some songs by Valentine Ransay.
- Valentine Ramsay, the main character round which the story revolves. He was married to Janet Oglethorpe but it wasn't a happy marriage. He eventually left her for Louise Ireland.
- Marjorie, the narrator. She is Aunt Charlotte Waterford's niece.
- Betty Jane, Marjorie's sister
- Aunt Charlotte Waterford. She looked after Marjorie in childhood.
- Uncle Harry Waterford, Charlotte's husband.
- Harriet Waterford, Charlotte and Harry's daughter.
- Elizabeth Waterford, Charlotte and Harry's daughter.
- Janet(Janey) Oglethorpe, Valentine Ramsay's ex-wife. She comes from a rich family of businessmen.
- Dickie, Janey and Valentine's son.
- Seymour Towne, Janey's new husband.
- Horace, Valentine Ramsay's late brother.
- The Steinert lads, some neighbours.
- Bonnie Brae, the Ramsay's home.
- Uncle Johnathan. He drinks much whiskey and smokes much tobacco. He is often reading books.
- Uncle Morton
- Molla Carlsen
- Miss Demming, a schoolteacher who teaches both Harriet and Marjorie.
- Black John
- Belle Wakeley, a neighbour who lives on Blinker's Hill.
- Mrs Hungerford, a deaf and old neighbour.
- Julia Knewstubb, an 'important' neighbour.
- Ida Milholland, an 'intellectual' neighbour. She speaks French.
- Roland Ramsay

== Allusions to other works ==
- Music is mentioned with Claude Debussy, and Richard Wagner's Das Rheingold and Die Walküre.
- Valentine dismisses Ida's French as learnt from Jacques-Bénigne Bossuet.
- Uncle Johnathan is said to have written poems in the manner of Thomas Moore.
