= Snowboarding at the 2015 Winter Universiade – Men's slopestyle =

The men's slopestyle competition of the 2015 Winter Universiade was held at Sulayr Snowpark, Sierra Nevada, Spain at February 13, 2015.

== Results ==
| Rank | Bib | Name | Country | Run 1 | Rank | Run 2 | Rank | Best | Notes |
|---|---|---|---|---|---|---|---|---|---|
| 1st place, gold medalist(s) | 12 | Petr Horák | Czech Republic | 90.75 | 1 | 92 | 1 | 92 | |
| 2nd place, silver medalist(s) | 14 | Piotr Janusz | Poland | 70 | 6 | 87.75 | 2 | 87.75 | |
| 3rd place, bronze medalist(s) | 5 | Martin Mikyska | Czech Republic | 82.25 | 2 | 74 | 3 | 82.25 | |
| 4 | 1 | Mikhail Matveev | Russia | 79.5 | 3 | 43.75 | 7 | 79.5 | |
| 5 | 9 | Matteo Cuny | France | 71 | 4 | 34.25 | 9 | 71 | |
| 6 | 7 | Jake Black | United States | 70.75 | 5 | 23 | 13 | 70.75 | |
| 7 | 6 | Matej Dolnik | Slovakia | 23.75 | 13 | 57.25 | 4 | 57.25 | |
| 8 | 15 | Benjamin Dunaux | France | 54.25 | 7 | 5.75 | 16 | 54.25 | |
| 9 | 3 | Billy Wandling | United States | 52 | 8 | 47 | 5 | 52 | |
| 10 | 13 | Kaspar Grigorjev | Estonia | 11.5 | 15 | 46.5 | 6 | 46.5 | |
| 11 | 2 | Max Bigley | United States | 42.25 | 9 | 25 | 12 | 42.25 | |
| 12 | 11 | Nicolas Palladio | France | 36.5 | 10 | 20 | 14 | 36.5 | |
| 13 | 10 | Madis Bachmann | Estonia | 36 | 11 | 25.75 | 11 | 36 | |
| 14 | 4 | Cody Cooper | United States | 15.75 | 14 | 35 | 8 | 35 | |
| 15 | 17 | Fabrizio Arnaud | Italy | 7.5 | 16 | 32.5 | 10 | 32.5 | |
| 16 | 8 | Dmitry Mindrul | Russia | 27.25 | 12 | 20 | 15 | 27.25 | |
| | 16 | Cesar Riversade | France | DNS | | | | | |
