= Black Jack (nickname) =

Black Jack is the nickname of the following people:

- John Vernou Bouvier III (1891–1957), father of Jacqueline Kennedy Onassis
- Jack Blackham (1854–1932), Australian cricketer
- Jack Brabham (1926–2014), Australian motor racing world champion
- Jack Burdock (1852–1932), American Major League Baseball player and manager
- Black Jack Christian (1871–1897), American western outlaw
- John Davidson (general) (1825–1881), American Civil War Union Army brigadier general and Indian fighter
- Frederick Galleghan (1897–1971), Australian Army major general
- Tom Ketchum (1863–1901), American western outlaw
- John A. Logan (1826–1886), American Civil War Union major general and Illinois politician
- John McCauley (1899–1989), senior commander in the Royal Australian Air Force (RAAF)
- Jack McDowell (born 1966), American Major League Baseball pitcher
- John McEwen (1900–1980), 18th Prime Minister of Australia
- John J. Pershing (1860–1948), United States Army general
- Jean Schramme (1929–1988), Belgian mercenary and planter
- Jack Stewart (ice hockey) (1917–1983), Canadian National Hockey League player
