= Black Jack (Chilean band) =

Chilean rock band

- Origin: Los Ángeles, Chile
- Genres: Alternative rock, pop
- Years active: 2005–2010
- Label: Independent
- Members: Diego Stegmeier; Franco Aravena; Felipe Gutierrez; Rodrigo Pacheco
- Past members: Raúl Guarda; Sebastian Villagra

Black Jack was a Chilean rock band that formed in Los Ángeles in 2005. Originally known as The Fire, the group was formed by Diego Stegmeier (vocals and drums), Raúl Guarda (guitar) and Sebastian Villagra (bass guitar). A few months later, Villagra left the band and was replaced by Franco Aravena. Aravena went on to play rhythm guitar, and later Rodrigo Pacheco, the new bassist, joined.

Between 2008 and 2009, the band recorded two singles called "Dejar de Pensar" and "Escuchar". In 2010, Guarda left the group to pursue his studies in dentistry, and was replaced by Felipe Gutierrez. That same year they recorded their third single "Realidad" with Gutierrez. The band was tight in 2010 and until today have not done any meeting. In 2012, Stegmeier released his first solo album, entitled Fuera de Foco, which has had very good reception. Then in 2013 Stegmeier launched on September 1 a new solo album called Viento, and this album contains 10 demos recorded in Santiago, Chile. In addition to his solo career is performing many musical projects.

== Musical style ==
=== Influences ===
Black Jack shows and defines their sound as "very influenced". Among these influences are clearly The Beatles, Oasis, The Strokes, Radiohead and Aerosmith.

Other bands that influence Black Jack are Red Hot Chili Peppers and Soda Stereo.

== Discography ==
- Dejar de Pensar (2008)
- Escuchar (2009)
- Realidad (2010)

== Members ==
- Diego Stegmeier – lead vocals, drums (2005–2010)
- Felipe Gutierrez – guitars, piano (2009–2010)
- Franco Aravena – guitars, keyboards, bass.(2006–2010)
- Rodrigo Pacheco – bass, keyboards, harmonica, guitar (2007–2010)

=== Past members ===
- Raúl Guarda – guitar, bass (2005–2009)
- Sebastian Villagra – bass (2005–2006)
