= House of Gold & Bones – Part 1 =

Studio album by Stone Sour
- Released: October 22, 2012
- Recorded: 2012
- Studio: Soundfarm Studios in Jamaica, Iowa, Metalworks Studios in Mississauga, Ontario, Canada
- Genre: Alternative metal; hard rock; nu metal
- Length: 43:21
- Label: Roadrunner
- Producer: David Bottrill

Stone Sour chronology
Audio Secrecy (2010)	House of Gold & Bones – Part 1 (2012)	House of Gold & Bones – Part 2 (2013)

Singles from House of Gold & Bones – Part 1
- 1. "Gone Sovereign/Absolute Zero" Released: August 24, 2012; 2. "Tired" Released: August 14, 2013

House of Gold & Bones – Part 1 is the fourth studio album by American rock band Stone Sour, and is the first of two consecutive albums to feature the House of Gold & Bones concept. Reprises of its songs are featured on the second House of Gold & Bones album, which was released in 2013. It is the first Stone Sour album without bass player Shawn Economaki, who left the band in 2012.

== Development ==
Stone Sour started working on the album on March 19, 2012 and Corey Taylor stated that the album would likely end up being a double album or concept album. It was later confirmed by the band that the songs would form a concept and would be released as two separate albums. Musically, Taylor also described the album's sound as "Pink Floyd's The Wall meets Alice in Chains' Dirt". It was also revealed that bassist Shawn Economaki was no longer in the band and that his studio replacement was Rachel Bolan from Skid Row.

== Marketing ==
On August 24, 2012, Stone Sour released both "Gone Sovereign" and "Absolute Zero". On October 11, 2012, the band released a music video for "Gone Sovereign", that features their current tour bassist Johny Chow.

== Release ==
House of Gold & Bones – Part 1 was released on October 22, 2012. It debuted at number-seven on the Billboard 200 music album charts, shipping an estimated 31,000 copies in its first week of release.

The album has sold just under 130,000 copies in the United States

=== Critical reception ===
Professional ratings
Aggregate scores
Source	Rating
Metacritic	79/100
Review scores
Source	Rating
About.com	3.5/5 stars
Allmusic	4/5 stars
Artistdirect	5/5 stars
Big Cheese	5/5
Loudwire	4.5/5 stars
Rock Sound	8/10
Under the Gun	9/10
Bracket and Bracket	96/100

House of Gold and Bones – Part 1 received generally favorable reviews from critics, receiving a 79/100 over rating from music aggregator website Metacritic. Rick Florino of Artistdirect stated "Ultimately, this is a milestone for Stone Sour and for modern rock music. It's on par with Alice in Chains' Dirt, Metallica's Master of Puppets, Queens of the Stone Age's Songs for the Deaf, Soundgarden's Superunknown, and any other game-changing albums you can think of," and awarded the album 5 out of 5.

Big Cheese also rated the album 5 out of 5, stating "Perhaps what's most immediate upon listening to 'House of Gold & Bones' is the sheer step up that Stone Sour have made as musicians. The likes of 'RU486' and 'Tired' simply would not have been possible if they'd been attempted by the band in their 2006 'Come What(ever) May' period. Simply astounding."

Rock Sound from the UK gave the album 8 out of 10 and said "songs like roof-raising anthem 'Absolute Zero', the frenetic, thrashy 'RU 486' and acoustic lament 'Taciturn' deserve to be heard within the context of the entirety of this mightily ambitious, versatile record."

Allmusic said of the album "the album follows an arc both thematically and sonically, with the intensity of the songs rising and falling in a way that feels more like a musical than an album of chest-thumping hard rock. This creates a nice dynamic between songs like the driving "My Name Is Allen" and its follow-up, the more contemplative and reflective "Taciturn," creating a palpable shift that comes through both lyrically and musically."

== Track listing ==
All lyrics written by Corey Taylor, all music composed by Stone Sour.

No.	Title	Length
1.	"Gone Sovereign"	4:03
2.	"Absolute Zero"	3:50
3.	"A Rumor of Skin"	4:11
4.	"The Travelers, Pt. 1"	2:27
5.	"Tired"	4:12
6.	"RU486"	4:22
7.	"My Name Is Allen"	4:18
8.	"Taciturn"	5:26
9.	"Influence of a Drowsy God"	4:29
10.	"The Travelers, Pt. 2"	3:02
11.	"Last of the Real"	3:01
Total length:		43:21

Japanese edition bonus track
No.	Title	Length
12.	"Gallows Humor (Rough Demo)"	3:30
Total length:		46:51

== Personnel ==
Stone Sour

- Corey Taylor − lead vocals, piano on track 10, gang vocals on track 6
- James Root − guitar, backing vocals on track 11
- Josh Rand − guitar
- Roy Mayorga − drums, synthesizer on tracks 1, 2, 8, 9

Additional musicians

- Rachel Bolan − bass guitar
- Kevin Fox − strings arrangement on tracks 4 and 5, cello on tracks 4 and 5
- Karen Graves − first violin on tracks 4 and 5
- Kate Unrau − second violin on tracks 4 and 5
- Anna Redekop − viola on tracks 4 and 5
- Stubs − gang vocals on track 6
- Lady − gang vocals on track 6
- Truck − gang vocals on track 6
- Sinner − gang vocals on track 6
- Ty Reveen − voice of "Reveen the Impossiblist"

Technical personnel

- David Bottrill − producer, digital editing
- Michael Phillips − engineering, digital editing
- Ryan Martin − assistant
- Martin Connors − guitar tech, bass tech
- Kevin Miles − guitar tech
- Jonathan Nicholson − drum tech
- Jeff Ocheltree − drum tech
- Jay Ruston − mixing
- James Ingram − assistant
- Spike − assistant
- Paul Logus − mastering
- Kevin Dietz − engineering (for string arrangements)
- Monte Conner − A&R

Art personnel

- Chapman Baehler − photography
- Sean Mosher-Smith − art direction, design, photography

== Charts ==
Chart (2012)	Peak position
Australian Albums Chart	13
Austrian Albums Chart	4
Belgian Albums Chart (Flanders)	36
Belgian Albums Chart (Wallonia)	44
Canadian Albums Chart	9
Dutch Albums Chart	30
Finnish Albums Chart	10
French Albums Chart	58
German Albums Chart	7
Irish Albums Chart	30
Italian Albums Chart	75
Japanese Albums Chart	14
New Zealand Albums Chart	12
Scottish Albums	11
Swedish Albums Chart	12
Swiss Albums Chart	8
UK Albums Chart	13
UK Rock Chart	1
US Billboard 200	7
US Billboard Hard Rock Albums	1
