= House of Gold & Bones – Part 2 =

Studio album by Stone Sour
- Released: April 9, 2013
- Recorded: 2012
- Studios: Soundfarm Studios, Jamaica, Iowa
- Genres: Alternative metal; hard rock
- Length: 50:46
- Label: Roadrunner
- Producer: David Bottrill

Stone Sour chronology
House of Gold & Bones – Part 1 (2012)	House of Gold & Bones – Part 2 (2013)	Meanwhile in Burbank... (2015)

Singles from House of Gold & Bones – Part 2
- 1. "Do Me a Favor" Released: February 12, 2013; 2. "The Uncanny Valley" Released: June 20, 2013

House of Gold & Bones – Part 2 is the fifth studio album by American rock band Stone Sour, and is the second and final album of the House of Gold & Bones concept. The album was released on April 3, 2013, in Japan, April 8 in the UK, and April 9 in the United States, via Roadrunner Records.

It was recorded at Soundfarm Studios simultaneously with House of Gold & Bones – Part 1, which was released in October 2012. The first issue of the House of Gold and Bones, a four-part comic book mini series, published by Dark Horse Comics, was released on April 17, 2013.

House of Gold & Bones – Part 2 is their second album to feature the same members from the previous album, and the final album to feature guitarist Jim Root before he was fired from Stone Sour seven months after the album's release, although the band did not publicly reveal his exit until May 2014.

== Development ==
Stone Sour started working on the album on March 19, 2012. Guitarist Josh Rand confirmed that the album would contain reprises of Part 1. Examples are "The Conflagration" containing the “I’m on my own” lyric from the 2-part song "The Travelers" and "The House of Gold and Bones" containing the bridge riff from "Absolute Zero." Rachel Bolan of Skid Row played bass during the recording of both House of Gold and Bones albums.

== Short story ==
House of Gold & Bones - Part 2 begins shortly after House of Gold & Bones - Part 1 concluded. A character called the Human is the protagonist, who has awoken in a mysterious world. He comes across characters such as Allen, Black John, and Peckinpah, who all seem to be propelling him forward in this mysterious world, toward a crimson city called Red City, where the Human will find the House of Gold and Bones. He has been instructed to make his way there before an event called the Conflagration - described by Peckinpah as a celebration of the Human's ability to choose - takes place.

=== Plot summary ===
The Human concedes that even though he is now an adult, he still lives to party. He describes a party about to take place at a house by a lakeside. As the Human's friends tell a story, a pitched scream emits from the direction of the lake - someone is drowning. The Human tries to stir his group to action, but they are all too intoxicated to move, so he tries to save the drowning victim, who he soon recognizes as Rachel - the daughter of his neighbors. The Human paddles his way out to Rachel and manages to grab her, but he is overcome by his intoxication before he can bring her ashore, so he pushes Rachel in the direction of the shore in hopes that someone would save her and then lets himself drift off.

The Human comes to in darkness, reflecting on his memories of saving Rachel at the lake. He gets up and finds a door, soon realizing that Black John and the Numbers have him captive in a basement in Red City. He finds a window and gets stuck trying to crawl through. Just as two of the Numbers come downstairs and approach him, Allen - now dressed as a beautiful woman - comes and pulls the Human fully through the window. The pair quickly flee through streets and alleys of Red City, passing mysterious, skulking zombies all the while. Allen explains that these people are zombies because they have nothing better to do. The Human is stricken by his surroundings - he thinks of the city as blank and yet full of concepts.

The Human and Allen eventually arrive at a park. The Human realizes that Allen has again disappeared and that Black John and the Numbers have now caught up with him. The Numbers surround the Human and Black John slowly approaches, but the Human decides that he's done running and he's now looking for a fight. Just as he prepares for the confrontation, Peckinpah is suddenly at his back, this time well-dressed in a suit and tie. The two fight their way through the hordes, eventually breaking away and running through Red City. When they finally decide it's safe to stop, the Human is doubled over and heaving, while Peckinpah seems exhilarated at the fight and flight.

The Human notes that they have arrived in a cemetery named Gravesend. Peckinpah beckons him to follow through the cemetery, and arrives at a headstone that reads "September, 1982" on it. This date is when the Human, aged ten at that point, lost his innocence. The revelation of this headstone compels the Human to realize that this whole world is him. Peckinpah explains that everyone has aspects of themselves that they hate - such as Allen and Black John - and describes the entire situation as a war for the Human's soul. He explains that everyone is just a collection of the choices they've made, and that depending on the Human's choice during the Conflagration, he may never return here again, or may be doomed to keep returning forever.

Confused and enraged, the Human swiftly leaves the cemetery, walking through Red City while contemplating his life's choices. Suddenly, torrents of rain begin pouring down in the city. The Human walks through the downpour, eventually arriving at a small, decrepit chapel. He takes a seat and begins to drift out of consciousness. He flashes back to 1982 - the Human, as a child, was reluctantly packing his bags to leave his home. He was tormented by the real-life Allen - the alcoholic boyfriend of his mother's who abused the Human when his mother was not around. As the Human packed his bags, Allen came into his room, beer in hand, and began beating him around. As the Human was made to leave his home with his mother and Allen, he promised himself that he would leave and rise above his circumstances. He promised himself that he would abstain from drugs and alcohol and that he would be a better person than Allen.

A voice in the church suddenly wakes the Human. The dreamworld Allen is standing before him, this time dressed as a demented Catholic priest. Allen and the Human verbally brawl, and while Allen explains that he's the version of the Human who hurts others to avoid being hurt, the Human realizes just how disgusted he is by Allen. Allen then reveals that the Conflagration is now underway, and the Human notices a plaque overhanging the priest's chair at the altar reading "In Domus de Aurum et Ossium", and as the meaning becomes apparent in the Human's head, the words immediately translate to "The House of Gold and Bones".

The Human immediately rises to leave the church, but when he flings open the door, he sees hordes of zombies and the Numbers surrounding him on the steps. In their midst, Peckinpah and Black John are struggling to overcome each other. Peckinpah sees the Human, casts Black John away, and immediately runs toward the Human. As the two retreat back into the church, the Numbers and the zombies began an ominous chant of "RU486". Safely back in the church, the Human bolts the door shut. When he turns around, Allen floats imposingly into the air above them, and Peckinpah dives for him. The two begin fighting ferociously while the Human struggles to process the entire situation. The Human freezes up and falls over, and Peckinpah almost immediately picks him back up and encourages him.

As Peckinpah tries to convince the Human that he just has to make the right choice, Allen becomes prominent and begins drowning him out. Peckinpah lets off a terrible scream and charges Allen, and they burst into ferocious fighting. As they fight, their images begin to blur, until they resemble a mirror fighting its own image. The Human then turns and notices the walls of the church are engulfed in flame, set alight by the church's candles. The Human's focus shifts back to the fighting pieces of himself, and when they begin to drown out even the flaming church, the Human realizes that he is ignoring even himself in this situation. He's not living the life he wants to live.

After watching the conflict awhile, the Human rises and approaches the church's altar. He notes that his body is contorting, damaged by the fight between Peckinpah and Allen. As the Human crawls toward the altar, he realizes that life can only carry on with an understanding of who he is and where he's been. However, he can only understand when he makes the choice to be a better person. He makes his choice and the entire world explodes - incinerated in a flash of heat until only black consciousness remains. The Human notes that the House of Gold and Bones had been destroyed by his choices at the Conflagration, but he resolves to rebuild it to be stronger and even better. He concludes that with a genuine heart, he would lead a different life that would never get away from him again. He then awakens slowly.

== Marketing ==
Corey Taylor said about the album: "Part 2 is much darker [than the first part], if I'm honest. Aside from it being a completely different album, it feels more like a soundtrack to a movie in a lot of ways, man. It's really thematic. There are themes from [House of Gold & Bones – Part 1] that reveal themselves and that come again, musically. There's actually stuff from [House of Gold & Bones – Part 2] that you'll hear that's on [House of Gold & Bones – Part 1] and you'll be like, 'Fucking hell!'" Taylor also said "It's heavier. It's much more in tune with the narrative. It's much more complex. It's just a kick-ass album that people won't even know to expect. But when you put one and two together and listen to it top to bottom, it's fantastic. It really all comes together, and we're excited about it."

The album's cover artwork was revealed on January 30, 2013, while the track list was revealed the following day. The album's first single, titled "Do Me a Favor", was released digitally on February 12, 2013, and was made available for streaming on the band's YouTube channel on February 8. On March 29, 2013, the band premiered "Gravesend" on Rolling Stone's website. On April 2, 2013, House of Gold & Bones – Part 2 was made available for streaming in full on the band's official website, one week prior to its official retail release.

There is also a four-part graphic novel series based on the album's concept that is titled "House of Gold and Bones". A teaser trailer was released on March 31 and announced that the series will be available on April 17 and will be published by Dark Horse Comics. The series is written by Corey Taylor and illustrated by Richard Clark.

== Release ==
House of Gold & Bones – Part 2 was released on April 9, 2013. The album sold 35,000 copies in the US in its first week and debuted at number-ten on the Billboard 200 chart.

=== Critical reception ===
Professional ratings
Aggregate scores
Source	Rating
Metacritic	74/100
Review scores
Source	Rating
Allmusic	4/5 stars
Classic Rock	3/5 stars
The Guardian	4/5 stars
Loudwire	4.5/5 stars
Melodic.net	3/5 stars
Metal Hammer	8/10
Stereoboard	5/5 stars

House of Gold & Bones – Part 2 much like its predecessor, House of Gold & Bones – Part 1, received generally favorable reviews upon release. Gregory Heaney of Allmusic gave the album four out of five stars and said that the band's decision to release the material in two parts was "a smart move" and concluded in his short review that "anyone who enjoyed the previous record will certainly find more to love here". Rick Florino of Artistdirect was very positive about the album, giving it a full five stars and stating "In a stroke of genius, not only do they tell a universally identifiable story of a man at life's crossroads, but they also get more intimate than ever before." and also calling the album "the best music of the band's career to date".

== Track listing ==
All lyrics written by Corey Taylor, all music composed by Stone Sour.

No.	Title	Length
1.	"Red City"	4:39
2.	"Black John"	4:03
3.	"Sadist"	5:08
4.	"Peckinpah"	4:11
5.	"Stalemate"	4:48
6.	"Gravesend"	4:41
7.	"'82"	3:42
8.	"The Uncanny Valley"	4:02
9.	"Blue Smoke"	2:07
10.	"Do Me a Favor"	3:44
11.	"The Conflagration"	4:56
12.	"The House of Gold & Bones"	4:45
Total length:		50:46

Japanese edition bonus track
No.	Title	Length
13.	"Shine" (Rough Demo)	3:26
Total length:		54:05

- The album's packaging lists the tracks as 12–23, (13–25 on Japanese edition), continuing the track listing of House of Gold & Bones - Part 1.

== Personnel ==
Stone Sour

- Corey Taylor − lead vocals, piano on tracks 9, 11
- James Root − guitar
- Josh Rand − guitar
- Roy Mayorga − drums, synthesizer on tracks 1–6, 9, 10, piano on tracks 1–6, 9, 10

Additional musicians

- Rachel Bolan − bass guitar
- Kevin Fox – strings arrangement, cello on "The Conflagration"
- Karen Graves – violin
- Kate Unrau – violin
- Anna Redekop – viola
- Matthew "Stubs" Phillips − vocals on track 10 and 12
- Lady − vocals on track 10 and 12
- Truck − vocals on track 10 and 12
- Sinner − vocals on track 10 and 12

Technical personnel

- David Bottrill − producer, digital editing
- Michael Phillips – engineering, digital editing
- Jay Ruston – mixing
- Paul Logus – mastering
- Johnathan Nicholson – drum techs
- Jeff Ocheltree – drum techs
- Martin Connors – guitar and bass tech
- Kevin Miles – additional guitar tech
- Kevin Dietz – strings tech

== Chart positions ==
Chart (2013)	Peak position
Australian Albums Chart	4
Austrian Albums Chart	3
Belgian Albums Chart (Flanders)	40
Belgian Albums Chart (Wallonia)	57
Canadian Albums Chart	7
Danish Albums	39
Dutch Albums Chart	47
Finnish Albums Chart	20
French Albums Chart	71
German Albums Chart	3
Hungarian Albums Chart	1
Japanese Albums Chart	1
New Zealand Albums Chart	6
Scottish Albums	10
Swedish Albums Chart	25
Swiss Albums Chart	7
UK Albums Chart	11
US Billboard 200	10
