= Self-timer =

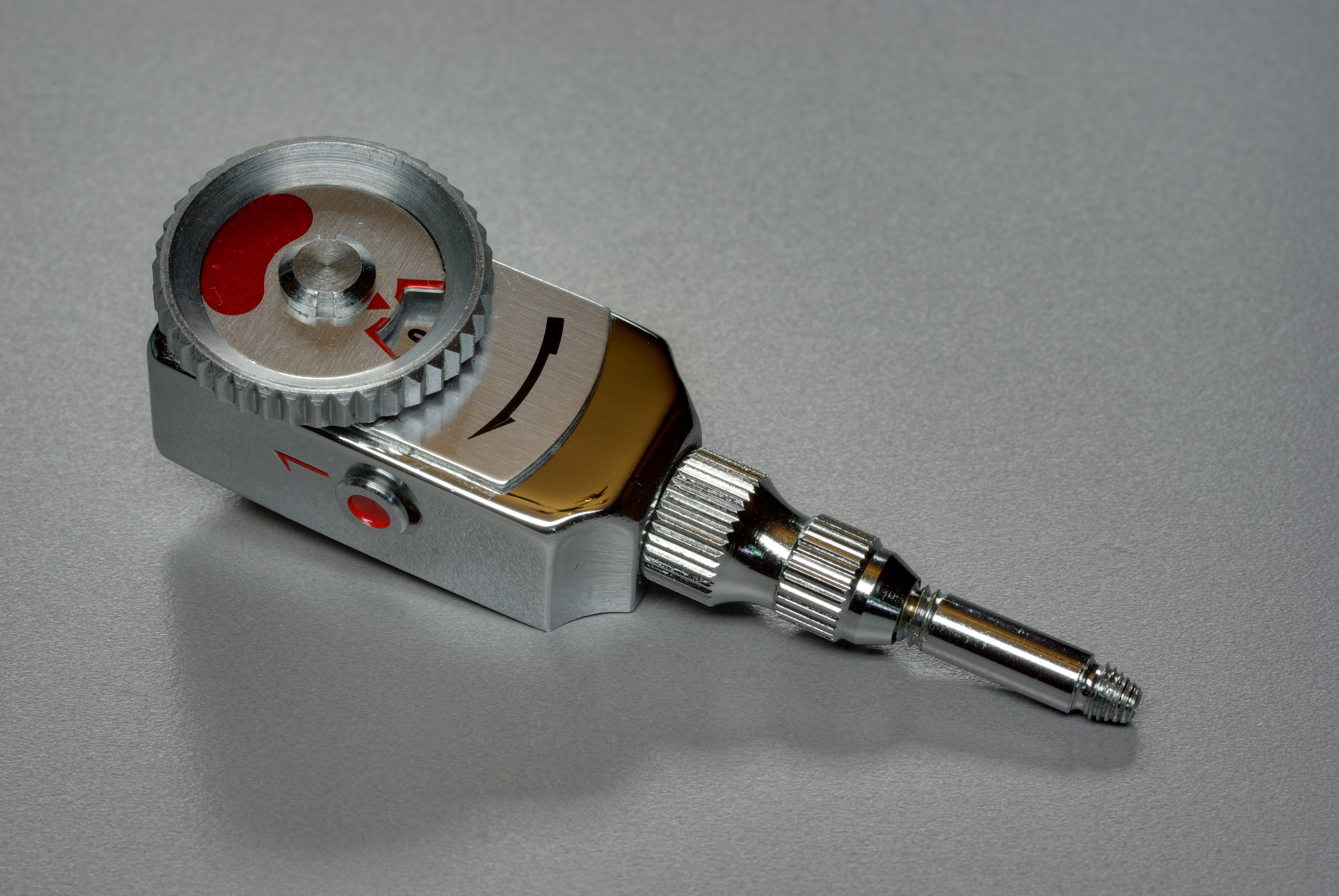
A manual self-timer, 2011.

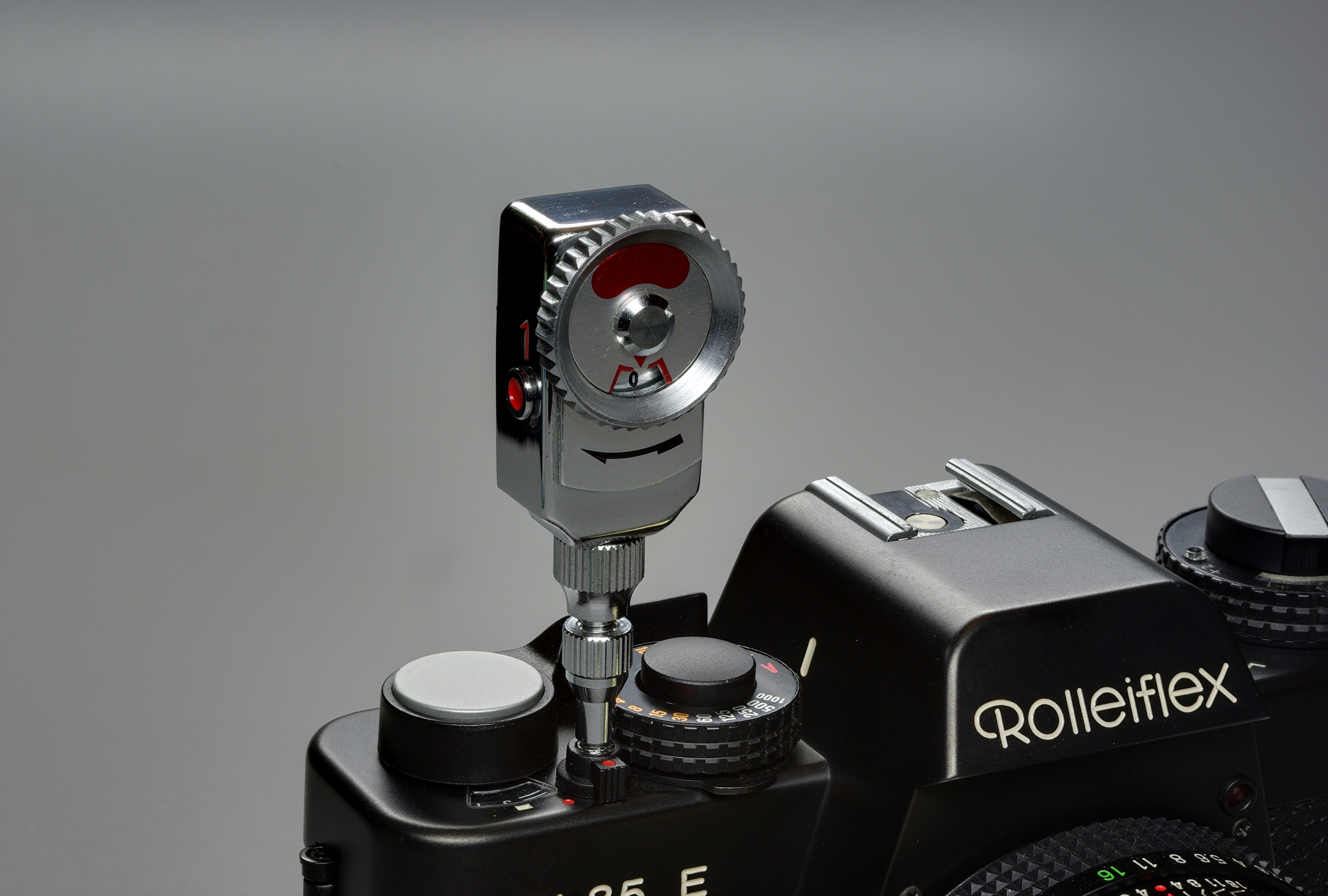
A manual self-timer mounted on a film camera, 2011.

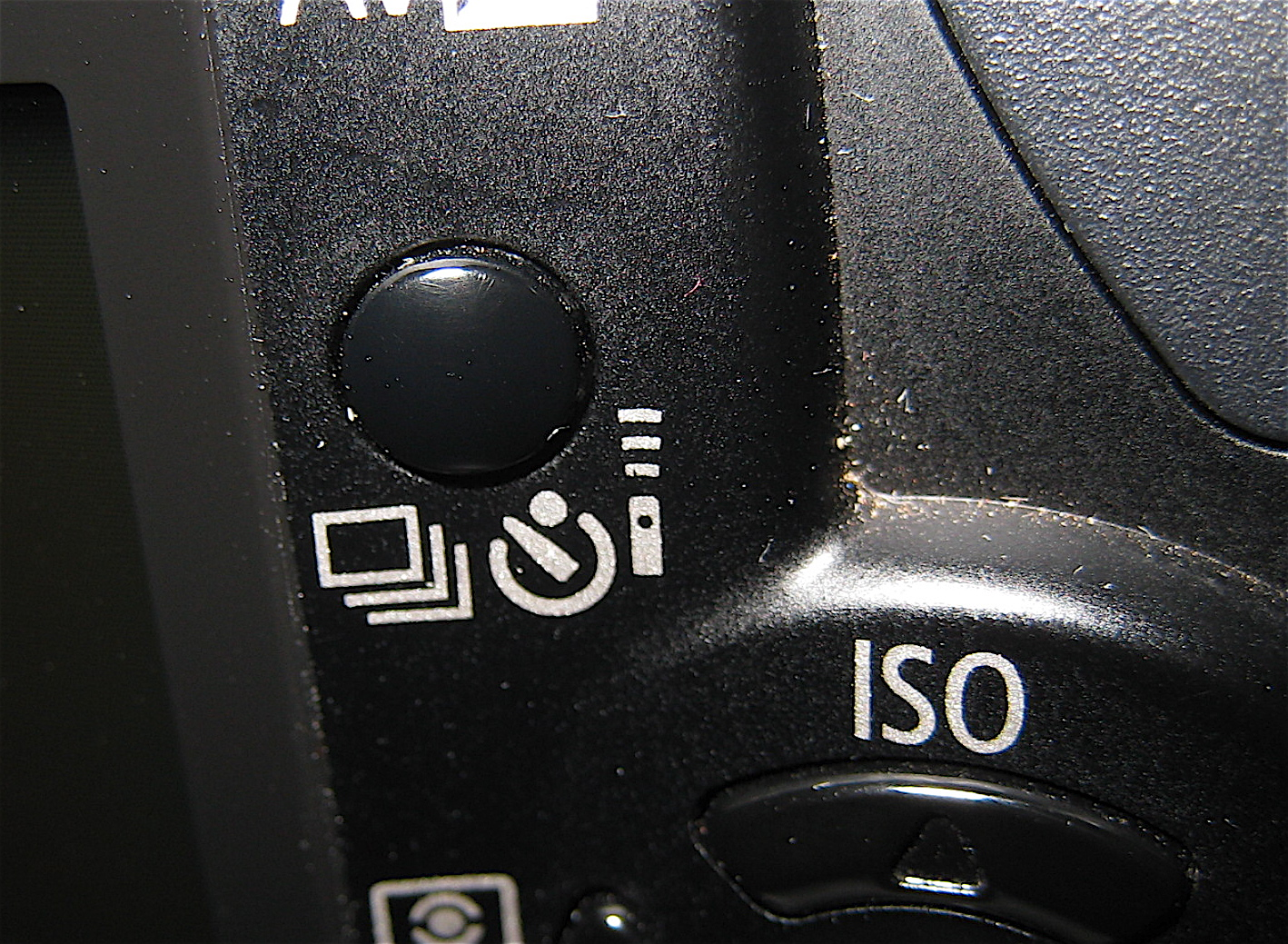
A self-timer drive mode button on a Canon digital camera, 2008.

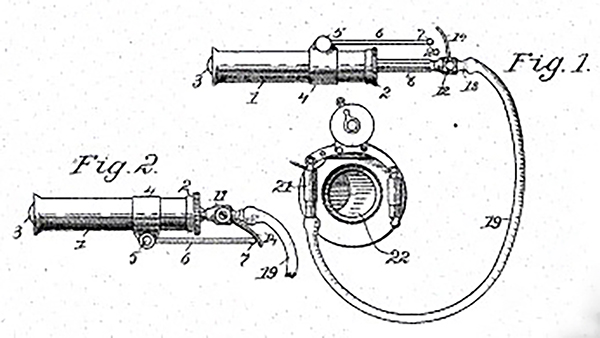
Robert Faries: Shutter tripper for Camera's, US Patent 690,939, January 14, 1902.

A self-timer is a device on a camera that gives a delay between pressing the shutter release and the shutter's activating (releasing). It is most commonly used to allow the photographer to take a photo of themselves (often with a group of other people), hence the name. It is typically used with the camera on a tripod or other stabilising device, providing between 2 to 10 or more seconds delay.

== Camera shake ==
The self-timer is also used to reduce camera shake when taking photographs in low light or with long (telephoto) lenses. The timer's delay gives the photographer time to steady the camera before the shutter fires, and allows vibrations from the mirror flipping up (on single-lens reflex camera's) to die out. It also eliminates any photographer-induced camera motion when the shutter button is pressed.

Single-lens reflex cameras have to flip up the viewing mirror before the picture is taken, which can also shake the camera. It is not uncommon for a camera to combine mirror lockup with the two-second self-timer mode, which reduces camera shake still further.

== Flash and delay ==
Most modern cameras with a self-timer flash a light during the countdown, emit a beeping sound, or both. These warnings generally increase in speed or intensity during the last few seconds, to warn that the shutter is about to fire.

The most common delay is ten seconds. Some cameras also have a two-second and five-second settings. A few cameras provide continuously variable delay. On some leaf-shutter cameras, the self-timer mode is selected with the flash-sync lever, and is marked V, for the German word Vorlaufwerk (Pre-drive).

== Alternative ==
Alternatives to the self-timer include a cable release, and infrared or radio remote control.

== See also ==
- Bulb (photography)
- Intervalometer
- Long-exposure photography
