= Digital zoom =

Magnification of a digital image

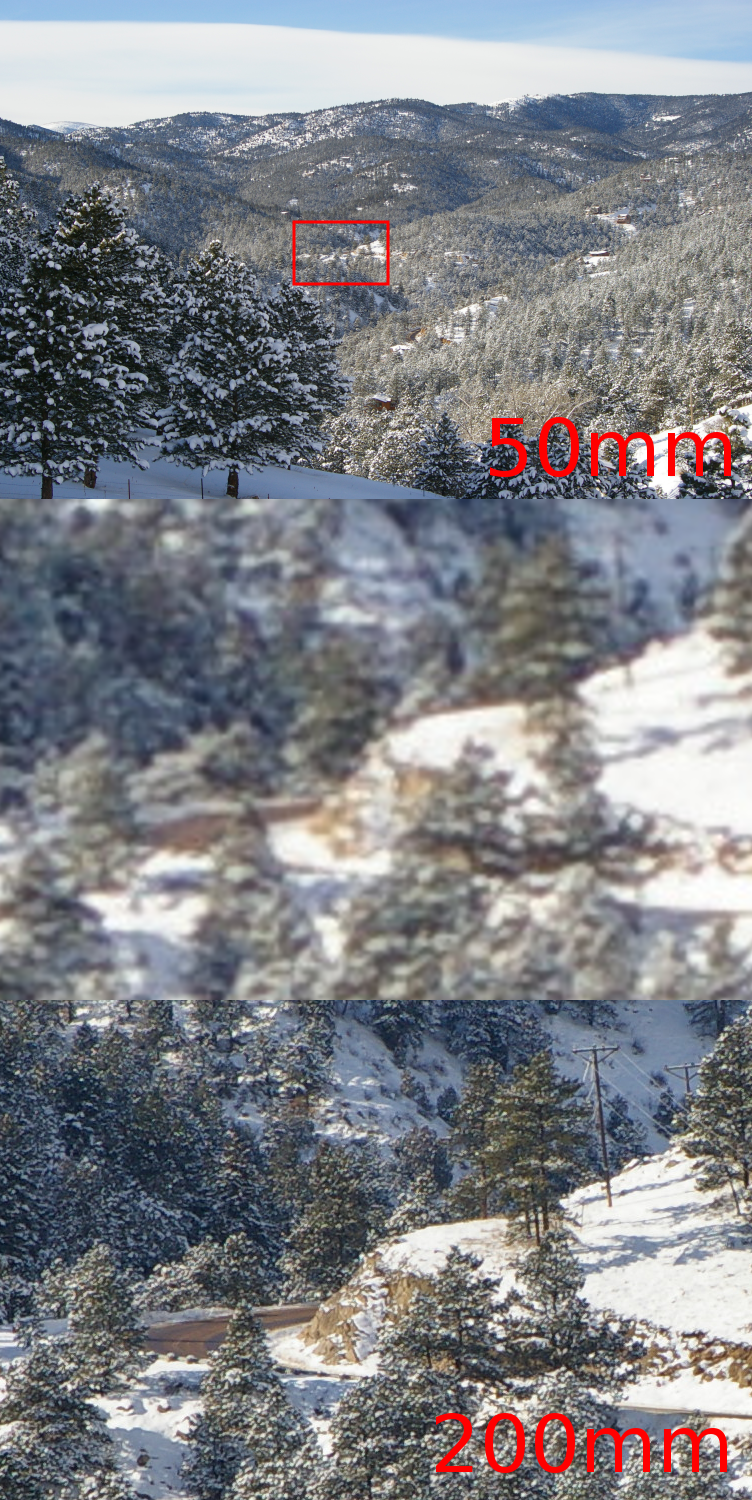
The middle photo was created using digital zoom from the top photo, which resulted in a loss of image quality. In contrast, the bottom photo was taken using the camera's optical zoom, which does not reduce image quality. Typically, digital zoom only becomes available after the optical zoom range has been fully used.

Digital zoom is a method of decreasing the precise angle of view of a digital photograph or video image. It is accomplished by cropping an image down to an area with the same aspect ratio as the original, and scaling the image up to the dimensions of the original. The camera's optics are not adjusted. It is accomplished electronically, so no optical resolution is gained. Digital zooming may be enhanced by computationally expensive algorithms which sometimes involves artificial intelligence.

In cameras that perform lossy compression, digital zoom is preferred to enlargement in post-processing, as the zooming may be applied before detail is lost to compression. In cameras that save in a lossless format, resizing in post-production yields results equal or superior to digital zoom.

Lower-end camera phones use only digital zoom and do not have optical zoom, while many higher-end phones have additional rear cameras, including fixed telephoto lenses that allow for the simulation of optical zoom. Full-sized cameras generally have an optical zoom lens, but some apply digital zoom automatically once the longest optical focal length possible has been reached. Professional cameras generally do not feature digital zoom.

== Not-deteriorated zoom limit ==
An optical zoom camera can be zoomed to its optical limit, and further zooming is sometimes allowed by digital zoom. Digital zoom uses the centre area of the optical image to enlarge the image. By reducing the image size, digital zoom occurs without image deterioration of the output image, and some cameras have a "not-deteriorated image" mode or an image deterioration indicator.

The table below shows the not-deteriorated zoom limit for some megapixel (MP) image sizes of a particular camera with optical zoom 24x, and digital zoom 4x for its maximum capability:

Image size	Maximum zoom factor	Not-deteriorated zoom limit	Magnification of digital zoom
16 MP	96.0×	24.0×	1.0×
10 MP	121.2×	30.2×	1.3×
5 MP	172.8×	43.2×	1.8×
3 MP	215.5×	54.0×	2.25×
VGA	382.6×	172.8×	7.2×

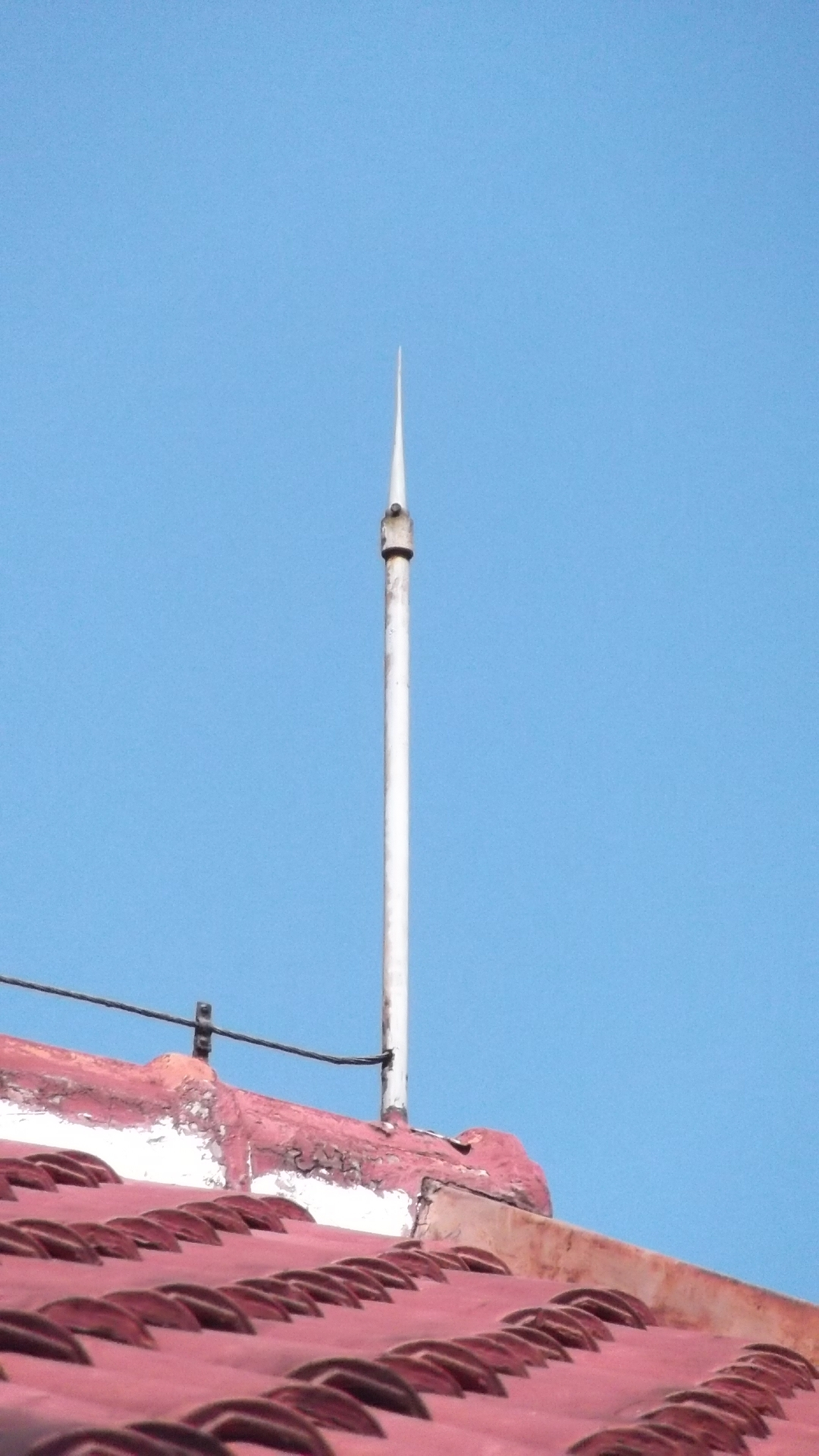
Handheld. Zoom 10×, optical zoom 10×, 2 MP from 16 MP maximum, ISO 800, 1/420, F/14.0, image is clear.

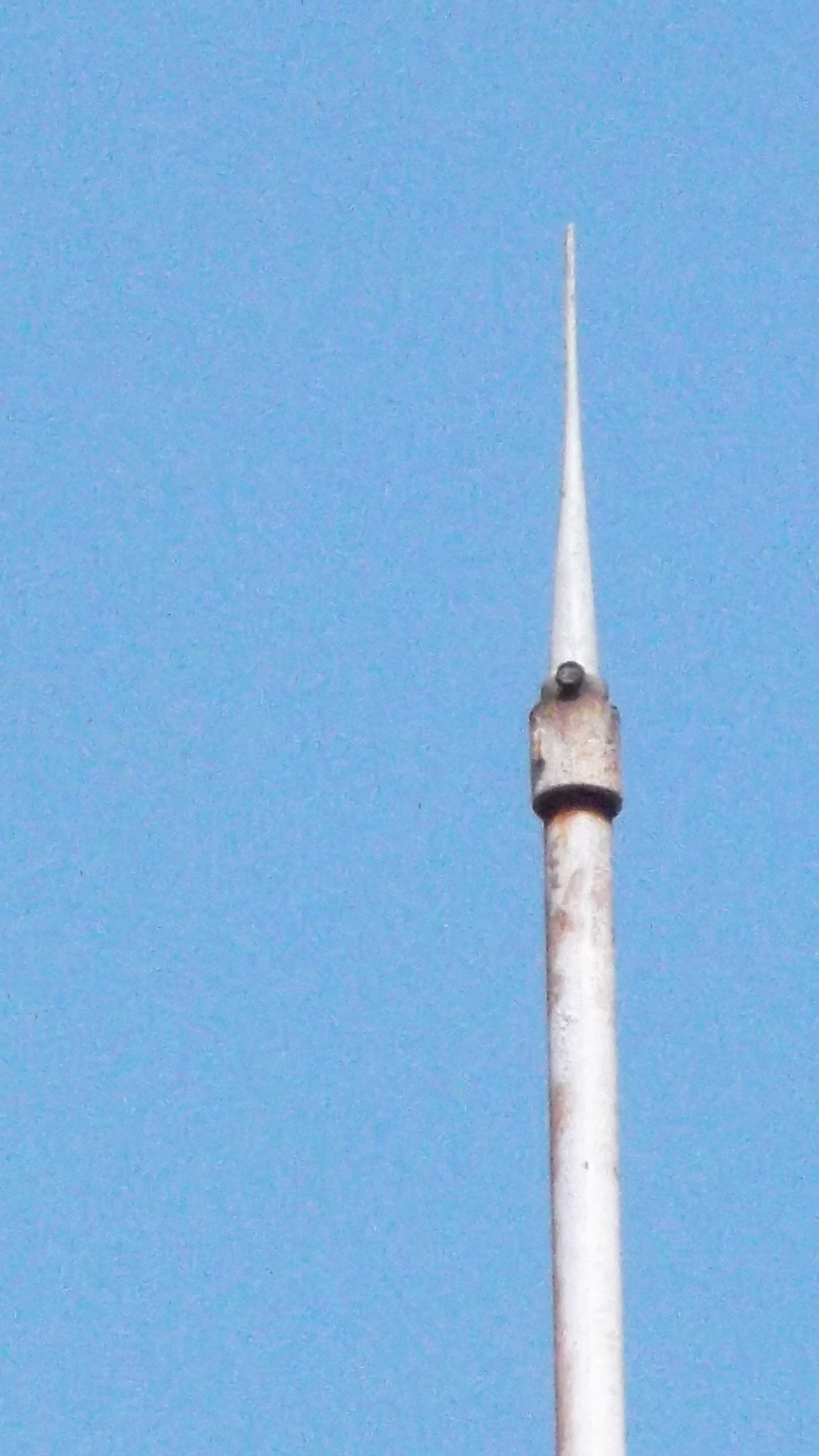
Handheld. Zoom 28×, optical zoom 10×, and digital zoom 2.8×, 2 MP from 16 MP maximum, ISO 800, 1/420, F/14.0, initial of deteriorated digital zoom, image is still clear.

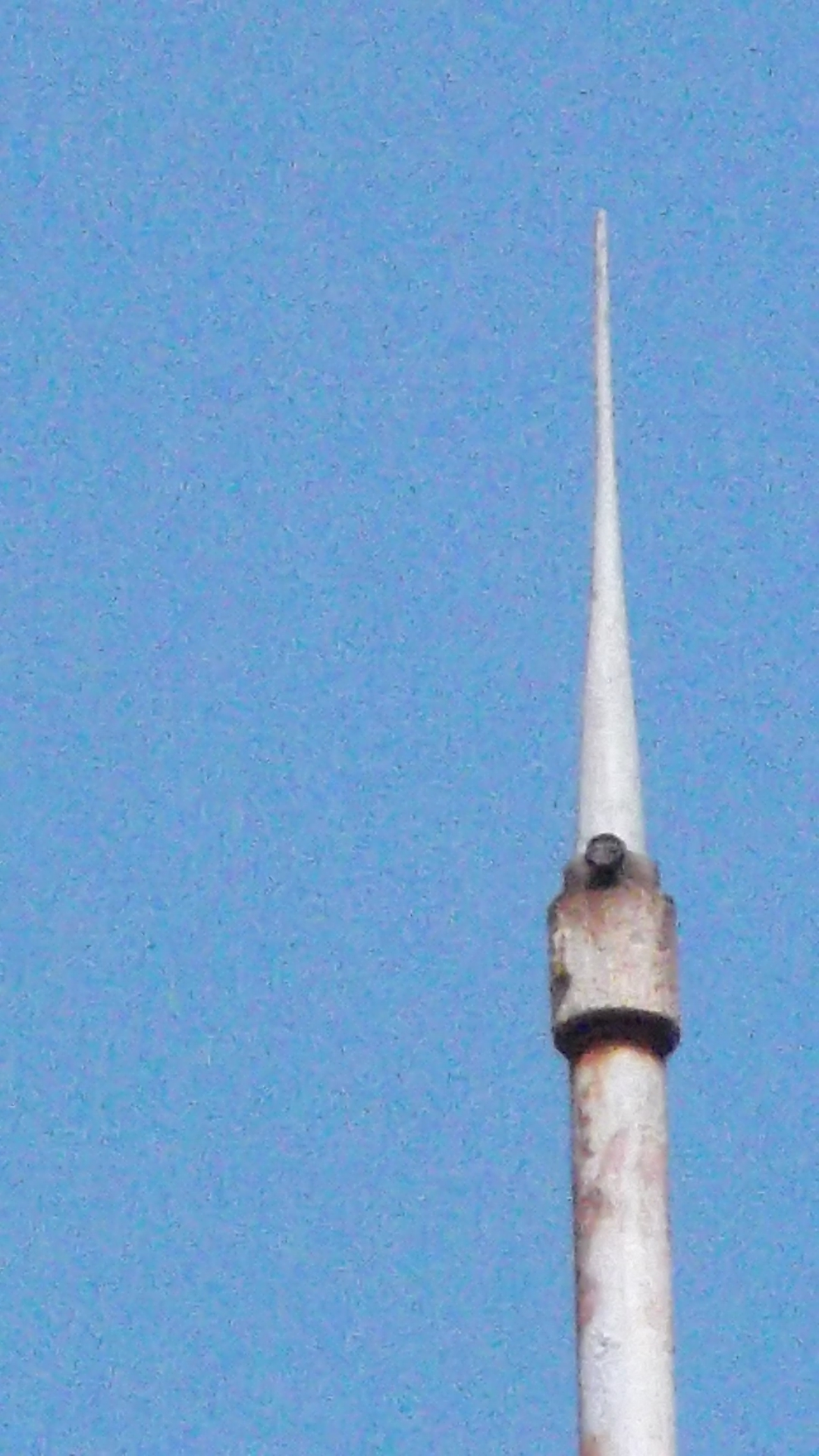
Handheld. Zoom 40×, optical zoom 10×, and digital zoom 4.0×, 2 MP from 16 MP maximum, ISO 800, 1/500, F/14.0, image is still clear with some noise. Magnification in deteriorated digital zoom zone is 40× : 28 = 1.4×.

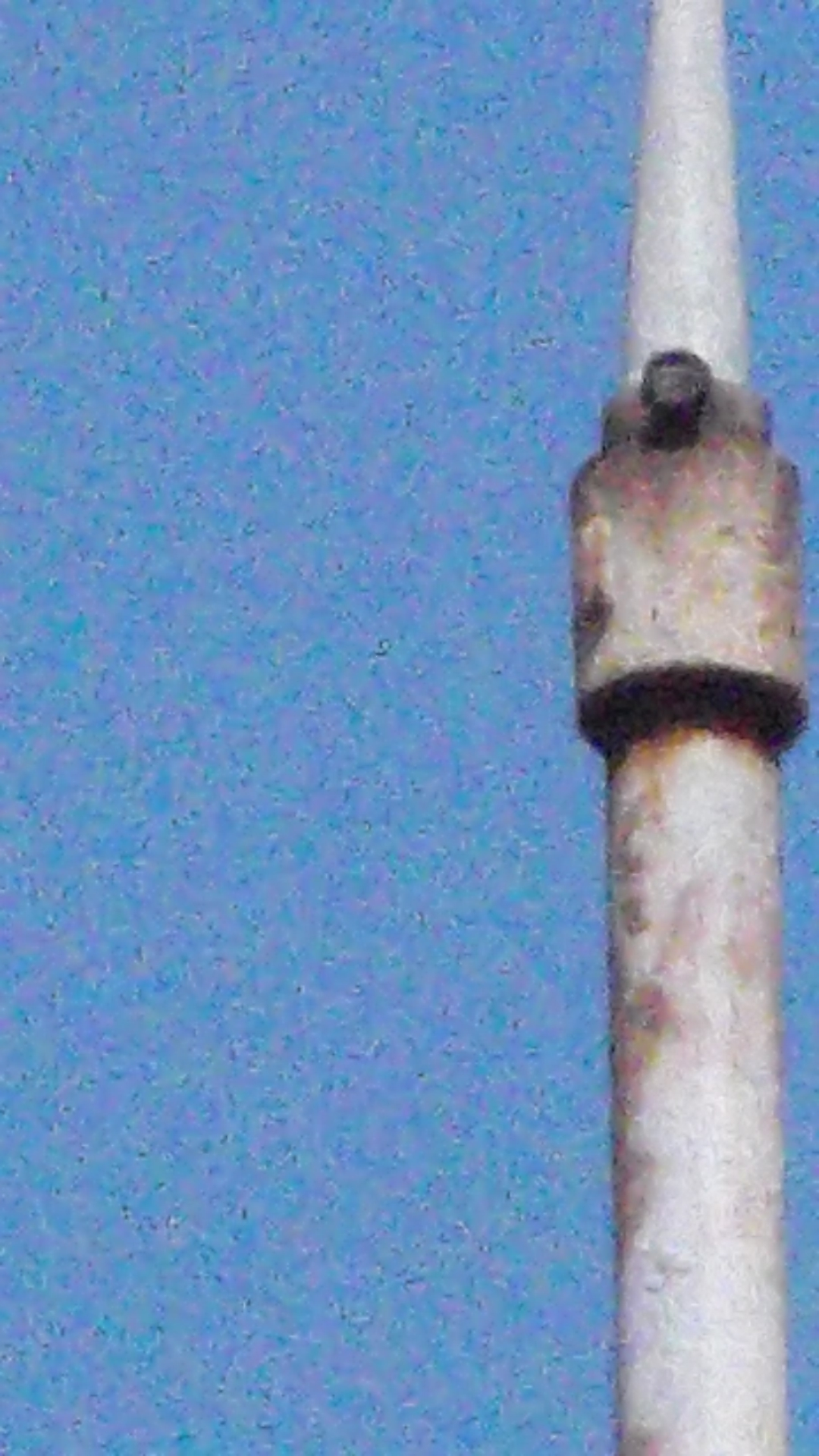
Handheld. Zoom 72×, optical zoom 10×, and digital zoom 7.2×, 2 MP from 16 MP maximum, ISO 800, 1/640, F/14.0, more noise, but the detail is still clear. Magnification in deteriorated digital zoom zone is 72× : 28 = 2.6×.

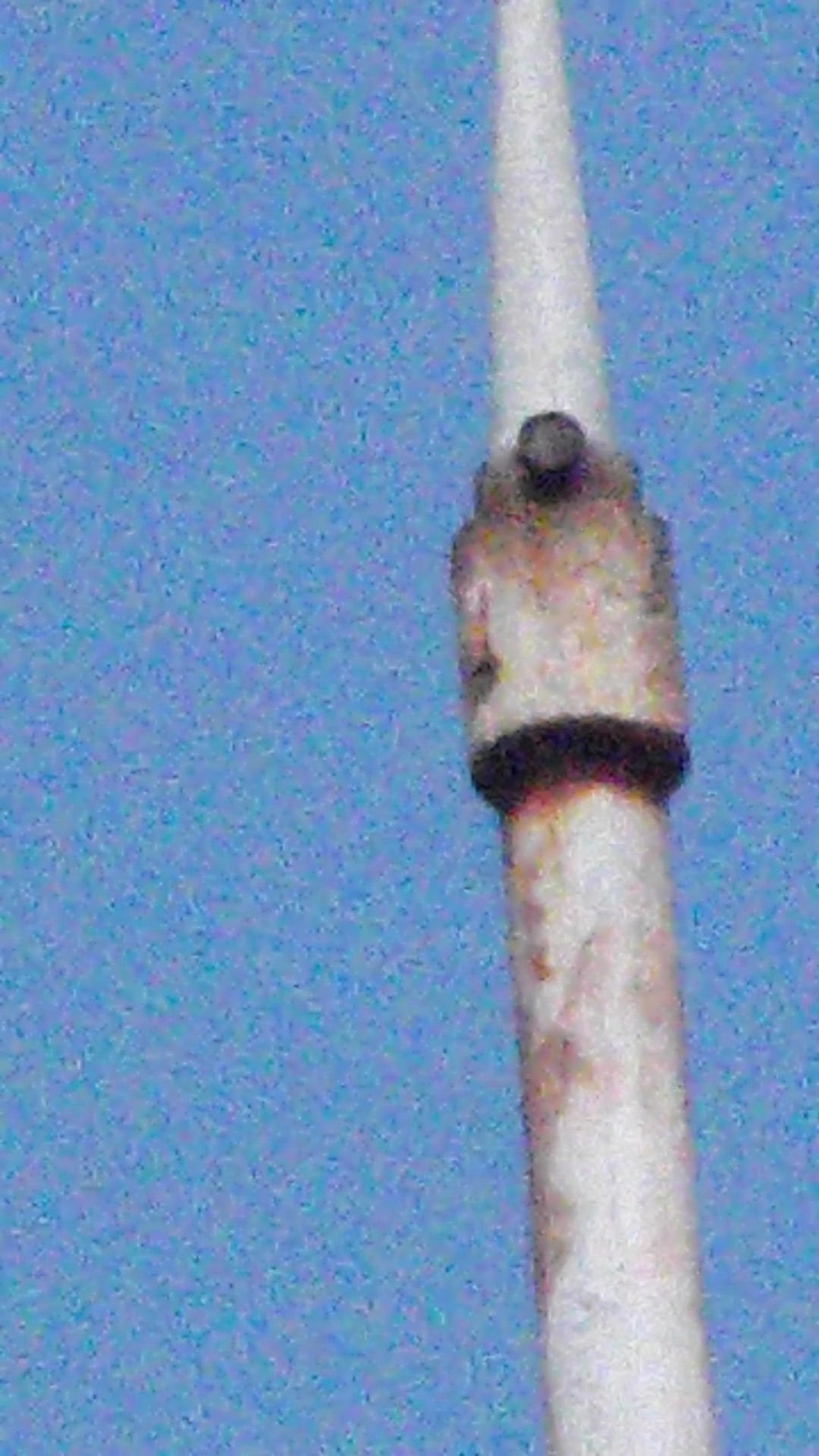
Handheld. Zoom 72×, optical zoom 10× and digital zoom 7.2× taken in full resolution 16 MP, but resize to 2 MP for uploading, ISO 800, 1/680, F/14.0, more noise, but the detail is more clear. Magnification in deteriorated digital zoom zone is 72×: 10 = 7.2×, the bigger the number, the worse the image.

Some camera firmwares store lossily digitally zoomed images with accordingly reduced dimensions (width and height) rather than upscaling it to the original raster resolution. The benefits are reduced file sizes and the ability to calculate the zoom level from the image's dimensions, if not included in its metadata.

Cameras may have an intelligent zoom feature that allows an additional magnification of 2.0× on top of its optical zoom. Many cameras have 2 options: 1.4× and 2.0×. The intelligent zoom only uses the centre of the image sensor and does not interpolate the original resolution, so the resulting image quality is good in reduced resolution.

Hybrid zoom is a concept used in smartphones that takes advantage of optical zoom, digital zoom, and software to get improved results when zooming in further than the lens' physical capabilities. Smartphones with optical zoom have lenses with 3× or 5× magnification. Trying to zoom in further than this limit may result in loss of quality as the camera switches to digital zoom, though hybrid zoom may mitigate this. Many cameras, including mobile phone cameras, also employ lossless digital zoom for video recording by using the spare resolution of the image sensor for cropping by taking advantage of used video frame resolutions often being significantly below the available resolution of the image sensors.

This means that, for example, if implemented correctly by the camera hardware and software, a 2160p image sensor would enable up to 2× lossless digital zoom for 1080p video recording, 3× for 720p video, and 4.5× for 480p video by using image sensor cropping.

The terms among camera and image sensor manufacturers are "Smart Zoom" (Sony), "Safe Zoom" (Canon), "Sensor Crop" (Cisco) and "Intelligent Zoom" (Panasonic and others). There are also cameras with digital zoom functions as high as 7.2× and Smart Zoom with approximately 30× total zoom (optical zoom 20× and digital zoom 1.5×) for 7MP from 16MP total resolution, and also 144× total zoom (optical zoom 20× and digital zoom 7.2×) for VGA 640x480.

== Aesthetic ==
Photographers can purposefully employ digital zoom for the characteristic low-fidelity appearance of the images it produces. The appearance of poor quality in photographs can be intentionally used to imply carelessness on the part of the photographer and a sense of candidness in the photograph.

== See also ==
- Image scaling
- Teleside converter – a secondary lens made for fixed lenses that increases the focal length, uses as a filter
- Zoom lens
