= Rose Red Violent Blue (This Song Is Dumb & So Am I) =

Single by Stone Sour

from the album Hydrograd
- Released: September 13, 2017
- Recorded: 2016
- Genre: Hard rock
- Length: 4:56
- Label: Roadrunner
- Songwriter(s): Corey Taylor

Stone Sour singles chronology
"Song #3" (2017)	"Rose Red Violent Blue (This Song Is Dumb & So Am I)" (2017)	"St. Marie" (2018)

"Rose Red Violent Blue (This Song Is Dumb & So Am I)" is a song by American rock band Stone Sour. It was a single off of their album Hydrograd. As of February 2018, it had peaked at number 10 on the Billboard US Mainstream Rock Songs chart.

== Background ==
The song was debuted on June 25, 2017, BBC Radio 1's "Rock Show With Daniel P Carter", five days ahead of its release on the band's sixth studio album, Hydrograd, on June 30. A music video for the album was released on September 13, 2017, when the song was released to rock radio as a single. The video plays on the stereotype of popular rock bands going to strip clubs, but in a twist, instead of being patrons, they are instead working there, serving the drinks and doing the dances. The video features a cameo appearance by glam rock band Steel Panther.

== Themes and composition ==
The song has been described as hard rock. Loudwire described its sound as "an energetic rocker that sways from a light, moody opening to a hook-laden rager." The song was recorded live in the studio, without any auto-tune, pitch correction, or additional programming involved. AllMusic described the song as having "Beatles-esq verse melody" and an arena rock chorus.

== Reception ==
MetalSucks praised the song for being "a really good song, a slower number at first that opens up into a rocker, and it only solidifies my impression of Hydrograd. Stone Sour don’t get a ton of respect from the heavier spectrum of the metal community, but they’ve been pumping out incredibly solid hard rock jams album after album for nearly two decades now. How about a little respect?" Metal Injection was less positive about the song, stating that it "has a decent chorus but the verses have that "annoying earworm" quality that remind you of 90's one hit wonders like Marcy Playground and Harvey Dangers "Flagpole Sitta".

== Personnel ==
- Corey Taylor – vocals
- Christian Martucci – lead guitar
- Josh Rand – rhythm guitar
- Johny Chow – bass guitar
- Roy Mayorga – drums, percussion

== Charts ==
Chart (2017)	Peak position
US Mainstream Rock (Billboard)	10
