= Beyond (Corey Taylor song) =

2023 song by Corey Taylor

Single by Corey Taylor

from the album CMF2
- Released: May 16, 2023
- Recorded: 2023
- Genre: Alternative metal
- Length: 4:17
- Label: BMG Rights Management
- Songwriter: Corey Taylor
- Producers: Taylor; Jay Ruston

Corey Taylor singles chronology
| "On the Dark Side" (2022) | "Beyond" (2023) | "Post Traumatic Blues" (2023) |

Music video
- "Beyond" on YouTube

"Beyond" is a song by American musician Corey Taylor, the frontman of Slipknot and Stone Sour. It was the lead single from his second solo album CMF2. It peaked at number one on the Billboard Mainstream Rock Airplay chart in 2023.

== Background and release ==
Corey Taylor said that "Beyond" dates back to 2006, when he wrote the song. He said it was one of a couple of older songs he had written over the years and had previously debuted live with the Junk Beer Kidnap Band (JBKB). He said the songs were being recorded and released roughly 14 to 16 years after he had first performed them. Blabbermouth.net reported that Taylor had originally performed the song with the JBKB in 2009 and that it was reworked for CMF2. Taylor performed the track live for the first time as a solo artist on May 2, 2023, at The Theatre at the Santander Arena in Reading, Pennsylvania, during his solo U.S. tour. Taylor confirmed onstage that "Beyond" was the lead single from CMF2.

On May 15, 2023, Taylor shared a teaser clip of "Beyond" ahead of its release. The song was released on May 16, 2023 as the first official preview of the album. It is the fifth track on CMF2.

== Themes and lyrics ==
Taylor said that he originally wrote "Beyond" as an "aggressive romantic song", but was later looking at it as a kind of "come together" song. He wanted to bring people together and have his music take them beyond what they may think about him. He said that the song and its video were a reflection of finding love and passion. He also described the song as a celebration of discovery and a call for all to "join the revelry".

== Composition ==
Jon Hadusek of Consequence described "Beyond" as "pop-ish metal" and "heavy alternative metal". Taylor had rewritten the song four or five times over the years, with the arrangement remaining mostly the same while some sections and the lyrics were rewritten. Taylor said he "stripped away everything that was frivolous" and went with the things he loved about the song. Taylor said he did not have a specific style or influence in mind when working on the track, which began with the "bare bones" of the song. Christian Martucci contributed the intro based on an idea Taylor had, while the other band members added their own musical parts. The track was completed for CMF2 with producer Jay Ruston. Taylor largely sings melodically on the track, with several screamed passages. Anne Erickson of Blabbermouth.net described the song as a heavy-yet-melodic rock anthem with a hooky chorus and Taylor's powerful vocals over thick, mid-tempo guitars.

== Reception ==
Loudwire included "Beyond" in its selection of the best rock and metal songs of 2023 to that point, describing it as a "full on rocker" with "some My Chemical Romance energy".

== Track listing ==
"Beyond" single
| No. | Title | Length |
|---|---|---|
| 1. | "Beyond" | 4:17 |

== Music video ==
A music video for the song had been filmed and was tentatively scheduled to premiere online on May 15, 2023, but premiered via Rolling Stone on May 16, 2023. The video features Taylor with members of his solo band: Zach Throne, Dustin Robert, Christian Martucci, and Eliot Lorango. It was directed by Dale "Rage" Resteghini and features Taylor walking through a desert, as well as contortionists, fire breathers, and people dressed as jesters. It was filmed at the abandoned Lake Dolores Waterpark in the Mojave Desert in California. It also features a dozen or so men wearing different versions of Taylor's crash-test dummy mask approaching him, while Taylor wears a flag outfit and an eyepatch. The video then moves to a carnival setting where Taylor and his solo band perform the song, with members of the Cherry Bombs performing around them. Taylor appears as a wandering Uncle Sam, and the video ends with a live performance for a crowd of fans on a circular stage. He described the video as a metaphor and a representation of the United States "as a nation, as a country, as a people". He said it was a journey concerning where America was at the time and differences in how Americans look, talk, speak, and love.

== Personnel ==
Credits adapted from Apple Music.

Musicians

- Corey Taylor – lead vocals, backing vocals, guitar, production
- Christian Martucci – guitar
- Zach Throne – guitar, backing vocals
- Dustin Robert – percussion, drums
- Eliot Lorango – bass
- Walter Bäcklin – programming, keyboards

Technical personnel

- Jay Ruston – production, mixing, audio engineer
- John Douglass – audio engineer
- Paul Logus – audio engineer
- Tristan Hardin – audio engineer

== Chart performance ==
"Beyond" reached number one on the Billboard Mainstream Rock Airplay chart dated September 23, 2023, becoming Taylor's second solo number-one song on the chart after "Black Eyes Blue". It peaked at number six on the Rock & Alternative Airplay chart.

=== Weekly charts ===
Weekly chart performance for "Beyond"
| Chart (2023) | Peak position |
|---|---|
| Canada Rock (Billboard) | 14 |
| US Rock & Alternative Airplay (Billboard) | 6 |
| US Mainstream Rock Airplay (Billboard) | 1 |

=== Year-end charts ===
Year-end chart performance for "Beyond"
| Chart (2023) | Position |
|---|---|
| US Mainstream Rock Airplay (Billboard) | 16 |
