= Black President (band) =

American punk rock band

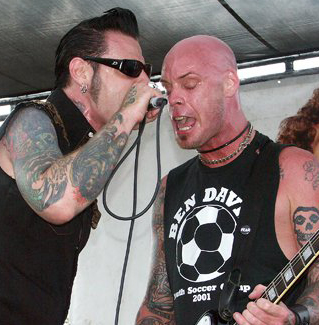
- Martucci (left) and Paulson performing with Black President

Background information
- Origin: Los Angeles, California, U.S.
- Genres: Punk rock; hardcore punk
- Years active: 2005–present
- Label: Cobra Music
- Members: Christian Martucci; Charlie Paulson; Jason Christopher; Dave Raun
- Past members: Greg Hetson; Wade Youman; Ty Smith; Pat "PK" Kim; Roy Mayorga

Black President is an American punk rock band. It was formed in 2005 by Circle Jerks and Bad Religion guitarist Greg Hetson and Goldfinger guitarist Charlie Paulson.

== History ==
The band was originally formed in late 2005 by Hetson and Paulson, who were joined by Jason Christopher (New Dead Radio) on bass and vocals, Roy Mayorga (Nausea) on drums, and Christian Martucci (The Strychnine Babies, Dee Dee Ramone) on vocals. Mayorga was unable to commit to the band due to previous commitments with Stone Sour. He was temporarily replaced by Wade Youman (Unwritten Law), and later by Ty Smith (Guttermouth, Bullets and Octane). Mayorga returned in time to record the debut album and has been permanently replaced by Dave Raun of Lagwagon.

Since forming, the band has toured with Bad Brains, Guttermouth, the Germs, Suicidal Tendencies, and The Bouncing Souls and performed stints on the 2008 Warped Tour as well as Riot Fest 2008.

On February 25, 2008, the band announced they had signed a deal with Cobra Music. At the time of the announcement, Hetson had left the band. Other members of the band cited Hetson's conflicting commitments with Bad Religion and Circle Jerks as the reason for his departure. Guitar duties were picked up by Martucci, reducing the quintet to a four-piece.

Their self-titled debut album was released September 16, 2008. The band also filmed a video for the song "Suspects." According to a MySpace blog post titled "in the war room", the band recorded 14 songs total: "12 originals, an alice cooper cover & a surprise track to be released early next year."

== Band name ==
The band came up with the name before Barack Obama had announced his 2008 run for the United States presidency. The band addressed the name in a March 2008 MySpace blog post titled "our name & barack obama" [sic]:

"when we came up with the name of the band senator obama had not yet announced his intention to run for office. it was just our way of saying america needed a change & we could think of nothing more indictative of change in a racist, soulless system than a BLACK PRESIDENT. the sad truth is we don't support ANY of the candidates at this point."

— Black President, "our name & barack obama"

Excerpts from the blog post were quoted in an article on Barack Obama in The Washington Post in which the band was mentioned.

== Band members ==
Current members

- Christian Martucci – lead vocals, rhythm guitar (2005–present)
- Charlie Paulson – lead guitar (2005–present)
- Jason Christopher – bass, backing vocals (2005–2007; 2008–present)
- Dave Raun – drums (2009–present)

Former members

- Greg Hetson – rhythm guitar (2005–2008)
- Wade Youman – drums (2006)
- Ty Smith – drums (2007)
- Pat "PK" Kim – bass (2007)
- Roy Mayorga – drums (2005–2006; 2008–2009)

== Discography ==
- Black President (2008, Cobra Music)
