= Song 3 =

"Song #3"

Single by Stone Sour

from the album Hydrograd
- Released: April 27, 2017
- Recorded: 2015–2016
- Studio: Sphere Studios in North Hollywood, Los Angeles
- Genre: Hard rock
- Length: 4:16
- Label: Roadrunner
- Songwriter: Corey Taylor
- Producer: Jay Ruston

Stone Sour singles chronology
"Tired" (2013)	"Song #3" (2017)	"Rose Red Violent Blue (This Song Is Dumb & So Am I)" (2017)

Music video
- "Song #3" on YouTube

"Song #3" is a single by American rock band Stone Sour, off of their studio album Hydrograd. It topped the US Billboard Mainstream Rock Songs chart in June 2017, where it held the top spot for five consecutive weeks.

== Background ==
On April 27, 2017, upon the announcement of Stone Sour's sixth studio album, Hydrograd, the band released two singles concurrently; "Fabuless" and "Song #3". The initial release was through streaming, and as an instant grat download when pre-ordering the album. The song was also released to radio, where it topped the US Billboard Mainstream Rock Songs chart. On June 7, 2017, frontman Corey Taylor performed the song solo with only an acoustic guitar on Japanese television show Sukkiri!.

== Themes and composition ==
Loudwire described the song as a "melodic rocker with huge hooks". The verses have Corey Taylor softly singing over somber, gloomy guitar chords, until the song erupts into a more intense and hopeful sounding chorus, with more layers of melodic guitar and a sing-song melody. Journalists noted that the song was a more melodic, accessible song compared to the band's other initial single from Hydrograd – "Fabuless". Billboard described the song as an "...emotive cut with a driving style that's similar to Stone Sour's Mainstream Rock Songs No. 1s 'Say You'll Haunt Me' (2010) and Tired' (2014)." Despite the more radio-friendly sound, frontman Corey Taylor states that the song does not feature any auto-tune or pitch-correction. Despite the song's title, it is actually the fifth track on its respective album, and has no relation thematically to the similarly named "Song 2" from Blur.

Lyrically, Corey Taylor described it as a love song, stating:

"Song #3" is actually about a certain kind of love that I don't think songwriters really talk about. It's that strong passionate love but also that undying love. That really, really good shit, you know? Everybody talks about the sappy stuff, everybody talks about the sexy stuff, but there's that middle section where one meets the other and you just never know which way it's going to tip at any given moment.

== Track listing ==
Digital single
No.	Title	Length
1.	"Song #3"	4:16

iTunes single
No.	Title	Length
1.	"Song #3" (acoustic)	3:56

== Personnel ==
- Corey Taylor – lead vocals, rhythm guitar
- Christian Martucci – lead guitar, backing vocals
- Josh Rand – rhythm guitar
- Johny Chow – bass
- Roy Mayorga – drums

== Charts ==
=== Weekly charts ===
Weekly chart performance for "Song #3"
Chart (2017)	Peak position
Canada Rock (Billboard)	44
US Hot Rock & Alternative Songs (Billboard)	13
US Rock & Alternative Airplay (Billboard)	11

=== Year-end charts ===
Year-end chart performance for "Song #3"
Chart (2017)	Position
US Hot Rock Songs (Billboard)	56
US Rock Airplay (Billboard)	40

== Certifications ==
Certifications for "Song 3"
Region	Certification	Certified units/sales
Australia (ARIA)	Gold	35,000^{‡}
Canada (Music Canada)	Gold	40,000^{‡}
^{‡} Sales+streaming figures based on certification alone.
