= Meanwhile in Burbank... =

EP by Stone Sour
- Released: April 18, 2015
- Recorded: February 2015
- Genre: Heavy metal, hard rock
- Length: 25:38
- Label: Roadrunner
- Producer: Stone Sour

Stone Sour chronology
House of Gold & Bones – Part 2 (2013)	Meanwhile in Burbank... (2015)	Straight Outta Burbank... (2015)

Meanwhile in Burbank... is an EP by American rock band Stone Sour, released on 18 April 2015. It consists of five cover songs from bands that influenced the members. It is the first Stone Sour recording to feature guitarist Christian Martucci and bassist Johny Chow.

== Development ==
Stone Sour started working on the album February 2014. Guitarist Josh Rand stated, "Back in February of 2014 while Stone Sour was touring, Corey approached me about Stone Sour doing a cover of the Metal Church song "The Dark" for the movie Fear Clinic. I thought it would be cool not only to record "The Dark", but the five cover songs that we had played on that tour. The idea was not to shy away from a song because it was popular or pick a band that most people might not have heard, but to pick ones that truly meant something to one of us at some point in our life."

== Marketing ==
The album's cover artwork was revealed on March 2, 2015, while the track list was revealed the following day.

== Track listing ==
No.	Title	Length
1.	"We Die Young" (Alice in Chains cover)	2:33
2.	"Heading Out to the Highway" (Judas Priest cover)	3:49
3.	"Love Gun" (Kiss cover)	3:32
4.	"Creeping Death" (Metallica cover)	6:36
5.	"Children of the Grave" (Black Sabbath cover)	4:48
Total length:		21:18

== Personnel ==
Stone Sour

- Corey Taylor – lead vocals
- Josh Rand – guitar, backing vocals on "Creeping Death"
- Christian Martucci – guitar, backing vocals on "Love Gun" and "Creeping Death"
- Johny Chow – bass guitar, backing vocals on "Creeping Death"
- Roy Mayorga – drums, percussion

Additional musicians

- Jason Christopher – backing vocals on "Creeping Death"
- Andrew Kline – backing vocals on "Creeping Death"
- Carl Reather – backing vocals on "Creeping Death"
- Melissa St. John – backing vocals on "Creeping Death"
- Mike Taft – backing vocals on "Creeping Death"
- T.J. Frost – backing vocals on "Creeping Death"
- Zak St. John – backing vocals on "Creeping Death"
