= Straight Outta Burbank... =

EP by Stone Sour
- Released: November 27, 2015
- Recorded: July 2015
- Genre: Heavy metal; hard rock
- Length: 19:27
- Label: Roadrunner
- Producer: Stone Sour

Stone Sour chronology
| Meanwhile in Burbank... (2015) | Straight Outta Burbank... (2015) | Hydrograd (2017) |

Straight Outta Burbank... is the second EP of The Burbank Duology by American rock band Stone Sour. The EP consists of another five cover songs from bands that influenced the members. The EP's title is a reference to the 1988 N.W.A. album Straight Outta Compton.

== Marketing ==
The album's cover artwork was revealed on November 9, 2015, while the track list was revealed the same day in Rolling Stone magazine. The whole EP was released on Black Friday 2015 on Record Store Day, which was the same as last record.

== Track listing ==
| No. | Title | Length |
|---|---|---|
| 1. | "Sailin' On" (Bad Brains cover) | 2:00 |
| 2. | "Running Free" (Iron Maiden cover) | 2:55 |
| 3. | "Gimme Shelter" (featuring Lzzy Hale) (The Rolling Stones cover) | 4:26 |
| 4. | "Too Fast for Love" (Mötley Crüe cover) | 3:40 |
| 5. | "Seasons in the Abyss" (Slayer cover) | 6:24 |
| Total length: | | 19:27 |

== Personnel ==
Stone Sour

- Corey Taylor – vocals, gang vocals on "Running Free" and "Too Fast for Love", piano on "Gimme Shelter"
- Josh Rand – guitars, gang vocals on "Running Free" and "Too Fast for Love"
- Christian Martucci – guitars, gang vocals on "Running Free" and "Too Fast for Love"
- Johny Chow – bass guitar, gang vocals on "Running Free" and "Too Fast for Love"
- Roy Mayorga – drums, percussion, gang vocals on "Running Free" and "Too Fast for Love", engineering

Additional personnel

- Lzzy Hale – vocals on "Gimme Shelter"
- Jeremy White – harmonica on "Gimme Shelter"
- Jay Ruston – mixing, Corey Taylor's vocals recording
- Shawn Economaki – "Gimme Shelter" and "Seasons in the Abyss" solo engineering

== Charts ==
| Chart (2015) | Peak position |
|---|---|
| US Billboard 200 | 78 |
