= Song 1 =

Song 1 may refer to:

- Song #1, a song by the Russian girl group Serebro
- Songs 1, an album by Judie Tzuke
- Song One, a 2014 film
- Song of Songs 1, the first chapter in the biblical book "Song of Songs" or "Song of Solomon"

== See also ==
- Song 2 – 1997 single by Blur
- Song 3
