= Hydrograd =

Studio album by Stone Sour
- Released: June 30, 2017
- Recorded: 2017
- Studios: Sphere Studios, North Hollywood, Los Angeles
- Genres: Alternative metal; hard rock
- Length: 65:14
- Label: Roadrunner
- Producer: Jay Ruston

Stone Sour chronology
Straight Outta Burbank... (2015)	Hydrograd (2017)	Hello, You Bastards: Live in Reno (2019)

Singles from Hydrograd
- 1. "Song #3" Released: April 27, 2017; 2. "Fabuless" Released: April 27, 2017; 3. "Rose Red Violent Blue (This Song Is Dumb & So Am I)" Released: September 13, 2017; 4. "St. Marie" Released: April 4, 2018; 5. "Knievel Has Landed" Released: August 23, 2018

Hydrograd is the sixth studio album by American rock band Stone Sour. Recorded at Sphere Studios in Los Angeles, it is the follow-up to the band's 2012–2013 albums House of Gold & Bones – Part 1 and Part 2. It was released worldwide on June 30, 2017, via Roadrunner Records.

Hydrograd also had a special album premiere with commentary on each song from frontman Corey Taylor on June 29, 2017, on Octane (Sirius XM). Two singles were released in promotion of the album ahead of its release: "Fabuless" and "Song #3". A third single, "Rose Red Violent Blue (This Song Is Dumb & So Am I)", was released on September 13, 2017, and a fourth and fifth, "St. Marie" and "Knievel Has Landed", on April 4 and August 23, 2018. On October 24, 2017, Hydrograd won the award for Hard Rock Album of the Year at the Loudwire Music Awards.

Hydrograd is the first album to be produced without founding guitarist Jim Root, following his departure from Stone Sour in 2014 to focus on his and Taylor's other band, Slipknot. It is also the band's most recent studio album, and the last to be released before they entered an indefinite hiatus in 2020.

== Background ==
According to Johny Chow, the record is said to be a departure from previous Stone Sour albums, more of a rock-and-roll album. He also mentions that the album has more of a groove feel to it and is very melodic with large choruses added to it. A total of 19 songs were recorded, with 15 making the final cut on the standard edition, while the other four were later released on the deluxe version.

== Critical reception ==
Professional ratings
Aggregate scores
Source	Rating
Metacritic	73/100
Review scores
Source	Rating
AllMusic	3.5/5 stars
Blabbermouth.net	8/10 stars
Cryptic Rock	4/5 stars
Kerrang!	4/5 stars
Loudwire	(Positive)
Rock Sins	10/10 stars
Metal Injection	8.5/10 stars

Reviews for Hydrograd were positive. Ali Cooper of Rock Sins gave the record a 10 out of 10, calling it a risk-taking gem for Stone Sour and Slipknot fans. In 2024, Loudwire staff elected it as the best hard rock album of 2017.

== Commercial performance ==
Hydrograd debuted at number eight on the US Billboard 200 with 33,000 album-equivalent units, with 30,000 of that figure coming from pure album sales. Hydrograd would go on to win Hard Rock Album of the Year in the 2017 Loudwire Music Awards.

== Track listing ==
All lyrics written by Corey Taylor; all music composed and performed by Stone Sour.

No.	Title	Length
1.	"YSIF" (instrumental)	2:02
2.	"Taipei Person/Allah Tea"	5:16
3.	"Knievel Has Landed"	4:01
4.	"Hydrograd"	4:37
5.	"Song #3"	4:16
6.	"Fabuless"	4:00
7.	"The Witness Trees"	4:45
8.	"Rose Red Violent Blue (This Song Is Dumb & So Am I)"	4:56
9.	"Thank God It's Over"	3:36
10.	"St. Marie"	4:27
11.	"Mercy"	3:23
12.	"Whiplash Pants"	4:19
13.	"Friday Knights"	5:17
14.	"Somebody Stole My Eyes"	3:47
15.	"When the Fever Broke"	6:32
Total length:		65:14

Japanese edition bonus track
No.	Title	Length
16.	"Burn One Turn One"	3:19
17.	"Unchained" (Van Halen cover)	3:25
Total length:		71:58

Deluxe edition
No.	Title	Length
1.	"Burn One Turn One"	3:19
2.	"Bootleg Ginger"	3:36
3.	"Live Like You're on Fire"	4:33
4.	"Subversive"	3:55
5.	"Unchained" (Van Halen cover)	3:25
6.	"Bombtrack" (Rage Against the Machine cover)	4:13
7.	"Outshined" (Soundgarden cover live at Sphere Studios)	5:15
8.	"Song #3" (acoustic)	3:56
9.	"Mercy" (acoustic)	3:21
10.	"Rose Red Violent Blue (This Song Is Dumb & So Am I)" (acoustic)	4:53
11.	"The Witness Trees" (acoustic)	4:25
12.	"Mercy" (live at Sphere Studios)	3:25
13.	"Fabuless" (live at Sphere Studios)	4:03
Total length:		52:10

== Personnel ==
Stone Sour

- Corey Taylor – lead vocals, rhythm guitar, backing vocals
- Christian Martucci – lead guitar, backing vocals, talk-box on "Live Like You're on Fire"
- Josh Rand – rhythm guitar, backing vocals
- Johny Chow – bass, backing vocals
- Roy Mayorga – drums, backing vocals

Additional personnel

- Sergei Ponzirelli – voice-over on "YSIF"
- Pearl Aday – backing vocals on "St. Marie"
- Joel Martin – Pedal steel guitar on "St. Marie"
- Dan Kaneyuki – orchestral musician
- Brian Mantz – orchestral musician
- Megan Milius – backing vocals
- George Adrian – backing vocals
- Alejandro Baima – backing vocals
- Francesco Cameli – backing vocals
- Rem Massingill – backing vocals
- Jason Christopher – backing vocals
- Matthew "Stubs" Phillips – backing vocals

Technical personnel

- Jay Ruston − production, engineering, mixing
- Francesco Cameli – engineering
- Alejndo Baima – engineering
- John Douglass – additional engineering
- Paul Logus – mastering
- Ron "REM" Massingill – guitar and bass technician
- Jon Nicholson – drum technician
- Gary Myerberg – studio technician
- Stone Sour – art direction
- Invisible Creature, INC. – art direction
- Ryan Clark (for Invisible Creature) – album design
- Travis Shinn – photography

== Charts ==
=== Weekly charts ===
Weekly chart performance for Hydrograd
Chart (2017)	Peak position
Australian Albums (ARIA)	2
Austrian Albums (Ö3 Austria)	5
Belgian Albums (Ultratop Flanders)	22
Belgian Albums (Ultratop Wallonia)	27
Canadian Albums (Billboard)	7
Czech Albums (ČNS IFPI)	16
Finnish Albums (Suomen virallinen lista)	14
German Albums (Offizielle Top 100)	4
Hungarian Albums (MAHASZ)	17
Irish Albums (IRMA)	34
Italian Albums (FIMI)	87
New Zealand Albums (RMNZ)	6
Scottish Albums (Official Charts)	3
Spanish Albums (Promusicae)	69
Swiss Albums (Schweizer Hitparade)	4
UK Albums (Official Charts)	5
UK Rock & Metal Albums (OCC)	1
US Billboard 200	8
US Top Hard Rock Albums (Billboard)	1
US Top Rock Albums (Billboard)	2

=== Year-end charts ===
Year-end chart performance for Hydrograd
Chart (2017)	Position
US Top Rock Albums (Billboard)	95
US Top Hard Rock Albums (Billboard)	31
