= John Jesse =

John Jesse may refer to:

- John John Jesse, American painter
- John Heneage Jesse, English historian
