= The Punk Terrorist Anthology Vol. 1 =

Compilation album by Nausea
- Released: 2004
- Recorded: 1988–1991
- Genre: Crust punk
- Length: 75:35
- Label: Blacknoise Recordings
- Producer: Jerry Adamowicz

Nausea chronology
Extinction (1990)	The Punk Terrorist Anthology Vol. 1 (2004)	The Punk Terrorist Anthology Vol. 2 (2005)

Professional ratings
Review scores
Source	Rating
Allmusic	4/5 stars

The Punk Terrorist Anthology Vol. 1 is a compilation album released in 2004 by American crust punk band Nausea on Brad Logan's Blacknoise Recordings. The album consists of previously released songs.

== Track list ==
No.	Title	Length
1.	"Here Today"	3:02
2.	"Cybergod"	4:09
3.	"Body of Christ"	4:36
4.	"Fallout (Of Our Being)"	1:47
5.	"Right to Live"	2:50
6.	"Blood and Circus"	1:52
7.	"Life Cycle"	6:33
8.	"Godless"	1:46
9.	"Clutches"	3:01
10.	"Extinction"	6:51
11.	"Inherit the Wasteland"	3:04
12.	"Battened"	2:06
13.	"Self Destruct"	2:26
14.	"Blackened Dove"	3:01
15.	"Johnny Got His Gun"	1:50
16.	"Butchers"	2:20
17.	"Technologickill"	6:04
18.	"Sacrifice"	4:13
19.	"Electrodes"	3:22
20.	"Clutches (1988)"	2:52
21.	"Productive Not Destructive"	1:47
22.	"Hear Nothing/Ain't No Feeble Bastard (Discharge cover)"	6:03
23.	"Cybergod (video)"
