= Great Big Mouth Records =

- Founded: 2006
- Founder: Corey Taylor; Denny Harvey
- Genre: Heavy metal
- Country of origin: U.S.
- Location: Des Moines, Iowa
- Official website: www.myspace.com/gbmrecords

Great Big Mouth Records is a record label based in Des Moines, Iowa, which was founded by Slipknot and Stone Sour frontman Corey Taylor and Denny Harvey. The label was conceived to help bring attention to Midwestern bands, Taylor explains; "basically we're just trying to unify the scene and really bring more attention to the Midwest than there is right now.".

== History ==
The label was launched in Des Moines, Iowa in 2006. Great Big Mouth Records was initially conceived while Corey Taylor was producing local band Facecage's album Facecage III and was the result of the lack of major-label interest in Midwestern bands. Taylor explains; "If I've learned anything, it's that the industry has to be led by the fucking hand to what kind of music people want. And that's what we’re trying to do." The label was described as "grass-roots yet high-tech" by Denny Harvey (Facecage's manager and label co-founder), he also went on to explain that; "eventually, we hope to make a big enough dent to secure major distribution. Until then, we will focus on Internet sales and independent promotion." Facecage are the only band on the label's roster and Taylor says he currently has no plans to add to it. In 2008 Taylor began working with Facecage on a second album, which was due for release in 2010.

== Artists ==
- Facecage
- Slipknot

== Discography ==
- Facecage – Facecage III (2006)
