= Junk Beer Kidnap Band =

American rock band

- Also known as: Corey Taylor & the Junk Beer Kidnap Band; JBKB; Corey Taylor & the JBKB
- Origin: Des Moines, Iowa, U.S.
- Genres: Alternative rock, hard rock
- Years active: 2008–2010
- Label: Am I Right?
- Past members: Corey Taylor; Nik Sorak; Fred Missouri; Tyson Leslie; Thomas Doggett; Ryan Berrier; Jason Christopher; Roy Mayorga

The Junk Beer Kidnap Band (alternatively called Corey Taylor & the Junk Beer Kidnap Band) was an American rock band from Des Moines, Iowa, formed in 2008. They were a side project of Corey Taylor, frontman of Slipknot and Stone Sour. The band never released any official albums or singles.

== History ==
Originally conceptualized as "the first stoner rock disco funk band" by vocalist and guitarist Corey Taylor, JBKB were formed in 2008. To begin with they wrote nine songs together, however it was when the band were jamming Taylor's solo material that he asked them to "back him up" on his shows he was planning. Taylor describes it as "pure Midwest rock" with "big chords, huge choruses and a lot of melody". The band has played some original songs, that were never released officially to streaming, as well as covers of songs from Stone Sour and others.

The JBKB original song "Imperfect" was slowed down and put in Stone Sour's 2010 release Audio Secrecy. The original version also had drums and an alternate ending, both of which were taken out of the Stone Sour version.

== Band members ==
Final line-up

- Corey Taylor – vocals, guitar (2008–2010)
- Nik Sorak – guitar, backing vocals (2008–2010)
- Jason Christopher – bass, backing vocals (2009–2010)
- Roy Mayorga – drums (2010)

Former members

- Fred Missouri – bass (2008–2009)
- Tyson Leslie – keyboard, guitar, backing vocals (2008–2009)
- Thomas Doggett – saxophone, wind synthesizer, backing vocals (2008–2009)
- Ryan Berrier – drums (2008–2009)

Timeline (2008–2010)
