= Black President (Black President album) =

Studio album by Black President
- Released: September 16, 2008
- Genre: Punk rock
- Length: 31:18
- Label: Cobra Music
- Producer: Charlie Paulson, Bruce Witkin

Black President is the debut album by American punk rock band Black President.

The album received a negative review from PunkNews.org.

== Track listing ==
1. "Intro" – 0:08
2. "Last Fucking Hope" – 3:10
3. "So Negative" – 2:16
4. "Not Enough" – 2:41
5. "Short List of Outspoken Suspects" – 1:25
6. "Neon" – 3:40
7. "Who Do You Trust?" – 1:19
8. "Watch You Drink" – 3:16
9. "Vacate the Vatican" – 1:59
10. "Halleujah" – 3:21
11. "Not Amused" – 1:56
12. "Ask Your Daddy" – 2:41
13. "Gaslamp James' Campaign Speech" – 0:15
14. "Elected" – 3:19
15. "Iron Fist" (bonus track) – 2:58

== Personnel ==
- Christian Martucci – vocals, guitar
- Charlie Paulson – guitar
- Jason Christopher – bass, vocals
- Roy Mayorga – drums
