= CMFT =

2020 studio album by Corey Taylor

Studio album by Corey Taylor
- Released: October 2, 2020
- Recorded: 2020
- Studio: The Hideout Studios (Henderson, Nevada)
- Genre: Hard rock
- Length: 47:41
- Label: Roadrunner
- Producer: Corey Taylor; Jay Ruston

Corey Taylor chronology
CMFT (2020)	CMF2 (2023)

Singles from CMFT
- 1. "Black Eyes Blue" Released: July 29, 2020; 2. "CMFT Must Be Stopped" Released: July 29, 2020; 3. "HWY 666" Released: September 2, 2020; 4. "Culture Head" Released: September 23, 2020; 5. "Samantha's Gone" Released: January 19, 2021

Professional ratings
Aggregate scores
Source	Rating
Metacritic	75/100
Review scores
Source	Rating
Allmusic	3.5/5 stars
Classic Rock	3.5/5 stars
Kerrang!	4/5
NME	4/5 stars

CMFT is the debut solo album by American musician Corey Taylor. It was released on October 2, 2020, by Roadrunner Records.

== Critical reception ==
Wall of Sound scored the album 7.5/10, stating: "[Corey Taylor is] doing something that he's always wanted to do. You're not going to hear these songs on a Stone Sour or Slipknot album, but you will hear them on CMFT which presents the iconic frontman's progression as a musician and just how talented he can be when he tries his hand at genres that have piqued his interest over the years."

== Track listing ==
All lyrics and music are written by Corey Taylor, except where noted.

No.	Title	Lyrics	Music	Length
1.	"HWY 666"			4:09
2.	"Black Eyes Blue"			3:22
3.	"Samantha's Gone"			3:12
4.	"Meine Lux"			3:12
5.	"Halfway Down"			3:15
6.	"Silverfish"			4:06
7.	"Kansas"			4:14
8.	"Culture Head"			3:59
9.	"Everybody Dies on My Birthday"		Christian Martucci	3:21
10.	"The Maria Fire"			3:52
11.	"Home"			3:46
12.	"CMFT Must Be Stopped" (featuring Tech N9ne and Kid Bookie)	Corey Taylor; Tyronne Hill; Aaron Yates		5:14
13.	"European Tour Bus Bathroom Song"			1:59
Total length:				47:41

Japanese bonus track
No.	Title	Length
14.	"Black Eyes Blue" (live acoustic)	2:26
Total length:		50:16

== CMFB... Sides ==
CMFB... Sides

EP by Corey Taylor
- Released: February 25, 2022
- Recorded: 2020
- Studio: The Hideout Studios (Henderson, Nevada), The Forum (Inglewood, California)
- Genre: Heavy metal, hard rock
- Length: 38:35
- Label: Roadrunner
- Producer: Corey Taylor; Jay Ruston

Corey Taylor chronology
CMFT (2020)	CMFB... Sides (2022)	CMF2 (2023)

Singles from CMFB... Sides
- 1. "All This and More" Released: November 27, 2020; 2. "Holier than Thou" Released: September 10, 2021; 3. "On the Dark Side" Released: February 11, 2022

On 25 February 2022, Taylor released a follow-up to CMFT called "CMFB... Sides" It includes nine unreleased B-sides, acoustic renditions, live versions, and covers of tracks that inspired Slipknot.

=== Track listing ===
All lyrics and music are written by Corey Taylor, except where noted.

No.	Title	Writer(s)	Original artist	Length
1.	"Holier Than Thou"	James Hetfield, Lars Ulrich	Metallica	4:10
2.	"All This and More"	Jimmy Zero	Dead Boys	2:53
3.	"Kansas (Acoustic)"			4:19
4.	"Shakin'"	Johnny Gunn, Liz Myers, Ralph Carter & Eddie Money	Eddie Money	3:01
5.	"Home/Zzyzx (Live)"			9:12
6.	"Lunatic Fringe"	Tom Cochrane	Red Rider	4:07
7.	"Got to Choose"	Paul Stanley	Kiss	3:21
8.	"Halfway Down (Acoustic)"			3:49
9.	"On the Dark Side"	John Cafferty	John Cafferty and the Beaver Brown Band	3:38

== Personnel ==
Credits adapted from the album's liner notes.

Musicians

- Corey Taylor – vocals, guitar, piano, production
- Christian Martucci – guitar, vocals
- Zach Throne – guitar, vocals
- Jason Christopher – bass, vocals
- Walter Bäcklin – additional keyboards, programming
- Dustin Robert – drums, percussion, vocals

Technical personnel

- Jay Ruston – production, engineering, mixing
- Tristan Hardin – recording and mixing assistant, additional engineering
- John Douglass – additional engineering
- Paul Logus – mastering
- Rem Massingill – guitar technician
- Robbie Cope – drum technician

== Charts ==
Chart performance for CMFT
Chart (2020)	Peak position
Australian Albums (ARIA)	8
Austrian Albums (Ö3 Austria)	8
Belgian Albums (Ultratop Flanders)	52
Belgian Albums (Ultratop Wallonia)	18
Canadian Albums (Billboard)	46
Dutch Albums (Album Top 100)	62
Finnish Albums (Suomen virallinen lista)	11
French Albums (SNEP)	158
German Albums (Offizielle Top 100)	9
Hungarian Albums (MAHASZ)	15
Irish Albums (OCC)	29
New Zealand Albums (RMNZ)	35
Portuguese Albums (AFP)	29
Scottish Albums (OCC)	8
Spanish Albums (PROMUSICAE)	71
Swiss Albums (Schweizer Hitparade)	9
UK Rock & Metal Albums (OCC)	2
UK Albums (OCC)	11
US Billboard 200	44
US Top Rock Albums (Billboard)	6

== See also ==
- Look Outside Your Window
