= The Punk Terrorist Anthology Vol. 2 =

Compilation album by Nausea
- Released: August 23, 2005
- Recorded: 1986–1988
- Genre: Crust punk
- Length: 75:15
- Label: Blacknoise Recordings
- Producer: John John Jesse

Nausea chronology
The Punk Terrorist Anthology Vol. 1 (2004)	The Punk Terrorist Anthology Vol. 2 (2005)

Professional ratings
Review scores
Source	Rating
Allmusic	3.5/5 stars
PunkNews	4.5/5 stars

The Punk Terrorist Anthology Vol. 2 is a compilation album released in 2005 by American crust punk band Nausea on Brad Logan's Blacknoise Recordings. The album consists of live, unreleased, and demo songs.

== Track list ==
No.	Title	Length
1.	"Smash Racism"	2:30
2.	"MTV (Feeding of the Fortune 500)"	2:07
3.	"New Generation"	3:17
4.	"Godless"	1:59
5.	"Clutches"	2:45
6.	"Home Sweet Home"	3:00
7.	"Sacrifice"	4:42
8.	"Johnny Got His Gun"	1:42
9.	"Smash Racism (alternate version)"	2:34
10.	"MTV (Feeding of the Fortune 500) (alternate version)"	2:05
11.	"Right to Live"	2:52
12.	"Godless (alternate version)"	1:56
13.	"Divide & Conquer"	3:09
14.	"Fallout (Of Our Being)"	1:54
15.	"World of No Tomorrow"	1:21
16.	"Real Enemy (The Business cover)"	2:12
17.	"Productive Not Destructive"	1:52
18.	"Red Winter (demo)"	1:59
19.	"Rauscous"	2:52
20.	"Home Sweet Home (demo)"	3:01
21.	"Divide & Conquer (demo)"	2:49
22.	"Clutches (demo)"	2:28
23.	"Untitled"	2:00
24.	"Freedom Peace and Unity (Omega Tribe cover) (live)"	1:57
25.	"Self Destruct (live)"	2:20
26.	"Religious Wars (Subhumans cover) (live)"	2:04
27.	"World of No Tomorrow (live)"	1:18
28.	"Real Enemy (The Business cover) (live)"	2:41
29.	"Fallout (Of Our Being) (live)"	1:55
30.	"Electrodes"	5:54
31.	"Fallout (Of Our Being) (video)"
