= Extinction (album) =

Studio album by Nausea
- Released: 1990
- Genre: Crust punk
- Length: 40:17
- Label: Profane Existence

Nausea chronology
Nausea (1988)	Extinction (1990)	Cybergod 7" (1991)

Professional ratings
Review scores
Source	Rating
Allmusic	4/5 stars
Punknews	5/5 stars

Extinction is the first studio album by New York City crust punk band Nausea. It was released in 1990 on Profane Existence.

== Track list ==
No.	Title	Length
1.	"Tech-No-Logic-Kill"	6:05
2.	"Inherit the Wasteland"	3:04
3.	"Johnny Got His Gun"	1:51
4.	"Self Destruct"	2:26
5.	"Butchers"	2:20
6.	"Sacrifice"	4:13
7.	"Godless"	1:47
8.	"Clutches"	3:02
9.	"Extinction"	6:52
10.	"Battened"	2:07
11.	"Blackened Dove"	3:01
12.	"Void"	3:29

== Personnel ==
- Bass, Vocals - John John Jesse
- Drums - Roy Mayorga
- Guitar - Victor Dominicis
- Vocals - Al Long, Amy Miret
