= CMF2 =

Studio album by Corey Taylor
- Released: September 15, 2023
- Recorded: Early 2023
- Studio: The Hideout Studios (Henderson, Nevada)
- Genres: Hard rock, alternative metal, post-grunge, Pop Punk
- Length: 53:04
- Label: BMG Rights Management
- Producer: Jay Ruston

Corey Taylor chronology
CMFT (2020)	CMF2 (2023)

Singles from CMF2
- 1. "Beyond" Released: May 16, 2023; 2. "Post Traumatic Blues" Released: July 11, 2023; 3. "Talk Sick" Released: August 16, 2023; 4. "We Are The Rest" Released: September 12, 2023

Professional ratings
Review scores
Source	Rating
Blabbermouth.net	8.5/10
Distorted Sound	7/10
Dork	4/5 stars
Ghost Cult Magazine	8/10
Kerrang!	4/5
NME	3/5 stars

CMF2 is the second studio album by American musician Corey Taylor. It was released on September 15, 2023, by BMG Rights Management.

== Track listing ==
All lyrics and music are written by Corey Taylor, except where noted.

No.	Title	Music	Length
1.	"The Box"		2:12
2.	"Post Traumatic Blues"		5:43
3.	"Talk Sick"		4:34
4.	"Breath of Fresh Smoke"		3:50
5.	"Beyond"		4:18
6.	"We Are the Rest"		3:02
7.	"Midnight"		3:36
8.	"Starmate"	Christian Martucci	3:43
9.	"Sorry Me"		4:02
10.	"Punchline"		4:13
11.	"Someday I'll Change Your Mind"		4:23
12.	"All I Want Is Hate"		3:21
13.	"Dead Flies"	Christian Martucci	6:13
Total length:			53:04

== Personnel ==
- Corey Taylor – vocals, guitar, mandolin on "The Box", spoken word on "Talk Sick", keyboards, theremin on "Starmate" and "Punchline"
- Christian Martucci – guitar, backing vocals
- Zach Throne – guitar, backing vocals
- Dustin Robert – drums, percussion, vocals
- Eliot Lorango – bass

=== Additional personnel ===
- Mariko Muranaka – cello on "The Box", "Midnight", "Sorry Me"
- Fred Mandel – hammond organ on "Breath of Fresh Smoke"
- Walter Bäcklin – additional keyboards, programming on "Beyond", "Midnight", "Punchline" and "Dead Flies"
- Roger Manning – keyboards on "We Are the Rest", "Midnight", "Starmate"
- Rah Satya – assistant
- Sarah Pardini – cover design, photography
- Zoe Thrall – studio manager

=== Technical personnel ===
- Jay Ruston – production, mixing, audio engineer
- Tristan Hardin – audio engineer
- Paul Logus – mastering
- Paul Bassett – drum technician

== CMF2B... or Not 2B ==
On May 17, 2024, Corey Taylor released CMF2B... or Not 2B, the B-side of CMF2. It included four unreleased B-side tracks and eight cover tracks, including covers of his own bands Stone Sour and Slipknot.

All music is composed by Corey Taylor unless specified.

No.	Title	Music	Length
1.	"HSOAT"		1:20
2.	"Tank"	Life Sex & Death	4:03
3.	"Not in the Mood to Live"		2:59
4.	"Killing Machine"	Judas Priest	2:59
5.	"Snuff (Live in London, '16)"	Slipknot	4:26
6.	"Shot In The Dark"	Ozzy Osbourne	4:04
7.	"Stay Calm"		3:06
8.	"Is It My Body"	Alice Cooper	2:39
9.	"Bother '23 (Still Bothered)"	Stone Sour	3:53
10.	"The Killing Moon"	Echo & the Bunnymen	4:21
11.	"Hey Manifesto"		4:29
12.	"Ten Years Gone"	Led Zeppelin	6:40
Total length:			45:30
