= Tarantula Heart =

Studio album by the Melvins
- Released: April 19, 2024
- Genre: Doom metal
- Length: 39:46
- Label: Ipecac
- Producer: Melvins; Toshi Kasai

The Melvins chronology
Bad Mood Rising (2022)	Tarantula Heart (2024)	Thunderball (2025)

Singles from Tarantula Heart
- 1. "Working the Ditch" Released: February 6, 2024; 2. "Allergic to Food" Released: March 20, 2024

Tarantula Heart is the 27th studio album by the American rock band the Melvins, released on April 19, 2024, via Ipecac Recordings. The first session took place in May 2022 with drummer / synthesist Roy Mayorga, and the second happened in January 2023 with guitarist Gary Chester.

The album uses dual drum parts, and, according to vocalist Buzz Osborne, was approached "different than any other Melvins album". A press release surrounding the album opined that "the LP is quite possibly the band's most unconventional, catchiest and imaginative work yet, continuing a legacy celebrated for its eccentric and extraordinary output".

== Recording ==
According to vocalist Buzz Osborne,

"The way we approached Tarantula Heart was different than any other Melvins album. I had Dale [Crover] and Roy Mayorga come in and play along with Steven and I to some riffs, then I took those sessions and figured out what parts would work and wrote new music to fit. This isn't a studio approach we've ever taken. Usually we have the songs written before we start recording!"

Crover stated that "The majority of Tarantula Heart has dual drum parts. Roy is an amazing drummer. We would discuss what we would do pattern wise, then we'd just go for it. Improvising riffs and trading off on drum fills."

== Release and Reception ==
Professional ratings
Aggregate scores
Source	Rating
Metacritic	80/100
Review scores
Source	Rating
AllMusic	3.5/5 stars
PopMatters	8/10

Tarantula Heart was met with "generally favorable" reviews from critics. At Metacritic, which assigns a weighted average rating out of 100 to reviews from mainstream publications, this release received an average score of 80, based on 6 reviews.

== Track listing ==
Tarantula Heart track listing
No.	Title	Length
1.	"Pain Equals Funny"	19:08
2.	"Working the Ditch"	6:32
3.	"She's Got Weird Arms"	3:39
4.	"Allergic to Food"	5:37
5.	"Smiler"	4:50
Total length:		39:46

== Personnel ==
- Buzz Osborne – guitar, vocals
- Dale Crover – drums
- Roy Mayorga – drums
- Gary Chester – guitar
- Steven Shane McDonald – bass

== Charts ==
Chart performance for Tarantula Heart
Chart (2024)	Peak position
UK Album Downloads (OCC)	33
UK Independent Albums (OCC)	50
UK Rock & Metal Albums (OCC)	15
