= Nausea (band) =

American hardcore punk band

Background information
- Origin: New York City, U.S.
- Genres: Crust punk; d-beat; anarcho-punk
- Years active: 1985–1992
- Past members: Al Long; Amy Miret; Victor Venom; John John Jesse; Roy Mayorga; Neil Robinson; Pablo Jacobson; Jimmy Williams; Brian Patton

Nausea was an American crust punk band from New York City, active from 1985 to 1992. They are cited as a seminal band in the U.S. Anarcho-punk movement, and belong to the second-wave of Anarcho-punk.

Prior to Nausea, guitarist Victor Dominicis played in the hardcore punk bands Hellbent, Sacrilege, and Reagan Youth. Female vocalist Amy Miret was married to Agnostic Front vocalist Roger Miret until splitting up, and they have one child together. Nausea were involved in the New York City Lower East Side squatting community. Their earlier sound with singers Amy Miret and Neil Robinson was in the vein of hardcore punk, with influences such as Crass, Discharge, Black Sabbath, and Amebix. After Robinson's departure, he was replaced by Al Long and the band began to experiment with heavier metal influences, such as Slayer. Robinson went on to form the bands Jesus Crust and Final Warning, as well as starting Tribal War Records.

== Lyrics and musical style ==
Nausea's apocalyptic lyrics and artwork were influenced by the sociopolitical issues of the day, such as the Reagan Administration, the US-USSR Cold War, and threats of nuclear war with the USSR. Nausea focused on topics such as environmentalism, human extinction, pollution, and animal rights.

Nausea progressed from having a very Discharge styled hardcore punk sound, to in its later years with new singer Al Long, having a more dark and metallic sound, similar to UK bands like Amebix and Axegrinder. The band broke new ground for the emerging crust punk genre, and are seen as being prototypical of the genre. In their formative years, the founding members were compelled by the political and social messages that the band Crass would use to drive their music; their lyrics reflected their views on feminism, anti-racism, class conflict, and the opposition against war.

== Later lineup ==
Nausea's final lineup was: John John Jesse (bass), Victor Venom (guitar, ex-Reagan Youth), Amy Miret (vocals), Al Long (vocals), and Roy Mayorga (drums).

John John Jesse has gone on to become an artist, as well as joining with members of Choking Victim in the band Morning Glory.

Roy Mayorga went on to play with Shelter, Soulfly, Maggott SS (featuring members of Electric Frankenstein and Degeneration), ABLOOM, and Stone Sour. He also filled in for Igor Cavalera with Sepultura in 2006. Later on, Mayorga became a full-time member of Amebix when they reunited in 2008 and stayed with them until their second disbandment in 2012. In 2016, Roy toured with Ministry.

== Popular culture ==
In Jackie Chan's film, Rumble in the Bronx, there is a punk seen wearing a leather jacket with 'Nausea' spray painted on the back.

== Members ==
- Al "Hoon" Long – vocals (1988–1992)
- Amy Miret – vocals
- Victor "Vic Venom" Dominicis – guitar
- John John Jesse – bass
- Roy Mayorga – drums (1989–1992)

=== Previous members ===
- Brian Patton – drums (1985)
- Neil Robinson – vocals (1985–1988)
- Pablo Jacobson – drums (1985–1987)
- Jimmy Williams – drums (1987–1988)

== Discography ==
=== Official releases ===
- Nausea demo (self released, 1988)
- Extinction LP/Cassette (1990, Profane Existence/Meantime Records)
- Cybergod 7" (Allied Recordings, 1991)
- Lie Cycle 7" (Graven Image Records/ Skuld Records, 1992)
- Alive in Holland VHS (Channel Zero Reality/Profane Existence, 1993)
- Extinction: The Second Coming CD (Selfless Records, 1993)
- The Punk Terrorist Anthology Vol. 1 2xLP/CD (2004, Alternative Tentacles/Blacknoise Records)
- The Punk Terrorist Anthology Vol. 2 2XLP/CD (2005, Hellbent/Blacknoise)

=== Compilation appearances ===
- New York Hardcore: The Way It Is LP (Revelation Records, 1988)
- Squat or Rot Volume. 1 7" (Squat or Rot Records, 1989)
- They Don't Get Paid, They Don't Get Laid, But Boy Do They Work Hard LP (Maximum Rock'n'Roll, 1989)
- Murders Among Us 7" (Vermiform Records, 1990)
- More Songs About Plants and Trees 7" (Allied, 1991)
- Discharged: From Home Front to War Front 7" (Allied, 1992)

== See also ==
- Animal rights and punk subculture
