= The Strychnine Babies =

- Origin: Philadelphia, Pennsylvania, US
- Genres: Punk rock Hardcore punk
- Years active: 1996–1998
- Labels: American Punk Records; Electric Nerve Records
- Members: Christian Martucci; Eric Bowr; Dave Glass
- Past members: Toothless George

The Strychnine Babies were an American punk rock band formed in Philadelphia, Pennsylvania, United States, by Christian Martucci, Eric Bowr, and punk rock artist Dave Glass. They released their first demo cassette in 1996 and remained active until 1998. Their 1997 EP "Six Songs for Self Destruction" was remastered and re-released via Electric Nerve Records in 2009.

== Discography ==
- Three Song Demo Tape – (1996)
- Six Songs for Self Destruction EP – (1997)
- Kill Society/Dead Love 7" – (1998)
- This is American Punk, Vol. 1 – (1998)
- Six Songs for Self Destruction (Remastered) EP – (2009)
