= Black Eyes Blue =

2020 single by Slipknot and Stone Sour frontman Corey Taylor

Single by Corey Taylor

from the album CMFT
- Released: July 29, 2020
- Genre: Rock; power pop
- Length: 3:22
- Label: Roadrunner
- Songwriter: Corey Taylor

Corey Taylor singles chronology
"X-M@$" (2010)	"Black Eyes Blue" (2020)	"CMFT Must Be Stopped" (2020)

Music video
- "Black Eyes Blue" on YouTube

"Black Eyes Blue" is a song by American musician Corey Taylor, frontman of metal bands Slipknot and Stone Sour. It was his first solo single from his first solo album CMFT. It peaked at number one on the Billboard Mainstream Rock Songs chart in 2020.

== Background ==
The song was first released on July 29, 2020. It was released concurrently with another single – "CMFT Must Be Stopped". A lyric video was released on the same day. A full music video was later released on August 19, 2020. The song debuted at number 24 on the Billboard Mainstream Rock Songs and number 21 on the Billboard Hot Hard Rock Songs chart, just after a single week of being released.

== Themes and composition ==
With Corey Taylor's comments on the CMFT album, in regards to it being across many various genre and in styles not commonly found in his band's Slipknot and Stone Sour, publications noted the difference in sound between "Black Eyes Blue" and "CMFT Must Be Stopped". While publications commonly referred to the latter as rap rock, "Black Eyes Blue" was described as power pop by Rolling Stone magazine. Consequence of Sound referred to "Black Eyes Blue" as "more of a straight-ahead rocker" with "melodic punk-like verses reminiscent of [the band] Rise Against".

== Track listing ==
Digital download
No.	Title	Length
1.	"Black Eyes Blue"	3:22

Digital download (Acoustic)
No.	Title	Length
1.	"Black Eyes Blue" (Acoustic)	3:22

Digital download (Alternative Mix)
No.	Title	Length
1.	"Black Eyes Blue" (Alternative Mix)	3:07

Spotify single
No.	Title	Length
1.	"Black Eyes Blue"	3:22
2.	"CMFT Must Be Stopped" (feat. Tech N9ne, Kid Bookie)	5:14

Spotify single (Acoustic)
No.	Title	Length
1.	"Black Eyes Blue" (Acoustic)	3:22
2.	"Black Eyes Blue"	3:22

Spotify single (Alternative Mix)
No.	Title	Length
1.	"Black Eyes Blue" (Alternative Mix)	3:07
2.	"Black Eyes Blue" (Acoustic)	3:22
3.	"Black Eyes Blue"	3:22

== Personnel ==
Adapted from NME.
Musicians

- Corey Taylor – vocals, guitar, piano, production, writing
- Christian Martucci – guitar, vocals
- Zach Throne – guitar, vocals
- Jason Christopher – bass, vocals
- Dustin Robert – drums, percussion, vocals
- Walter Bäcklin – keyboards, programming
- Tech N9ne – vocals and writing on "CMFT Must Be Stopped"
- Kid Bookie – vocals and writing on "CMFT Must Be Stopped"

Additional personnel

- Jay Ruston – production, engineering, mixing
- Tristan Hardin – engineering
- John Douglass – engineering
- Paul Logus – mastering
- Rem Massingill – guitar technician
- Robbie Cope – drum technician

== Charts ==
Chart (2020)	Peak position
US Mainstream Rock (Billboard)	1
