= John John Jesse =

American painter

- Born: 1969 (age 56–57); New York City
- Education: self-taught
- Known for: Painting
- Movement: Pop Surreal, Cartoon-Tainted Abstract Surrealism

John John Jesse (born 1969) is an American illustrative painter from New York City's Lower East Side in the Juxtapoz gonzo-pop vein.

He painted the girls he grew up with, citing the punk lifestyle of girls and drugs. Most of the people featured in his work are his friends. They are generally nude or partially disrobed, in situations that are both fantastical and gritty. As of 2008, Jesse had created two series of renderings: black & white drawings he calls the "Baby Demonica" series and the second, full-color paintings he calls the "Demonica Erotica" series. Jesse has referenced Gustav Klimt, Caravaggio, Béla Iványi-Grünwald, and Mark Ryden as influences.

Jesse was a founding member and bassist of the New York Crust punk band, Nausea. The band toured the U.S., Canada, and Europe and disbanded in 1992. He has designed posters and album art for bands like Agnostic Front. He is a former guitar player for the band Morning Glory.

In 2005, Vivian Giourousis interviewed the artist for Hoard magazine and asked him to define punk rock. He replied, "punk rock was the world in which I entered at 14 years old because I didn't fit in anywhere, not at school, not with friends, and not with my family. Back in the 80's we were all serious misfits who didn't belong, and together we were REALLY united. We all came from broken homes, we were victims of child abuse, we were angry, political, idealistic, drunk and proud. Basically punk rock music goes beyond the realms of just being a music scene. It's a lifestyle and commitment. It's my world, and honestly it's all I know and it's where I fit."
