= Christian Martucci =

American musician

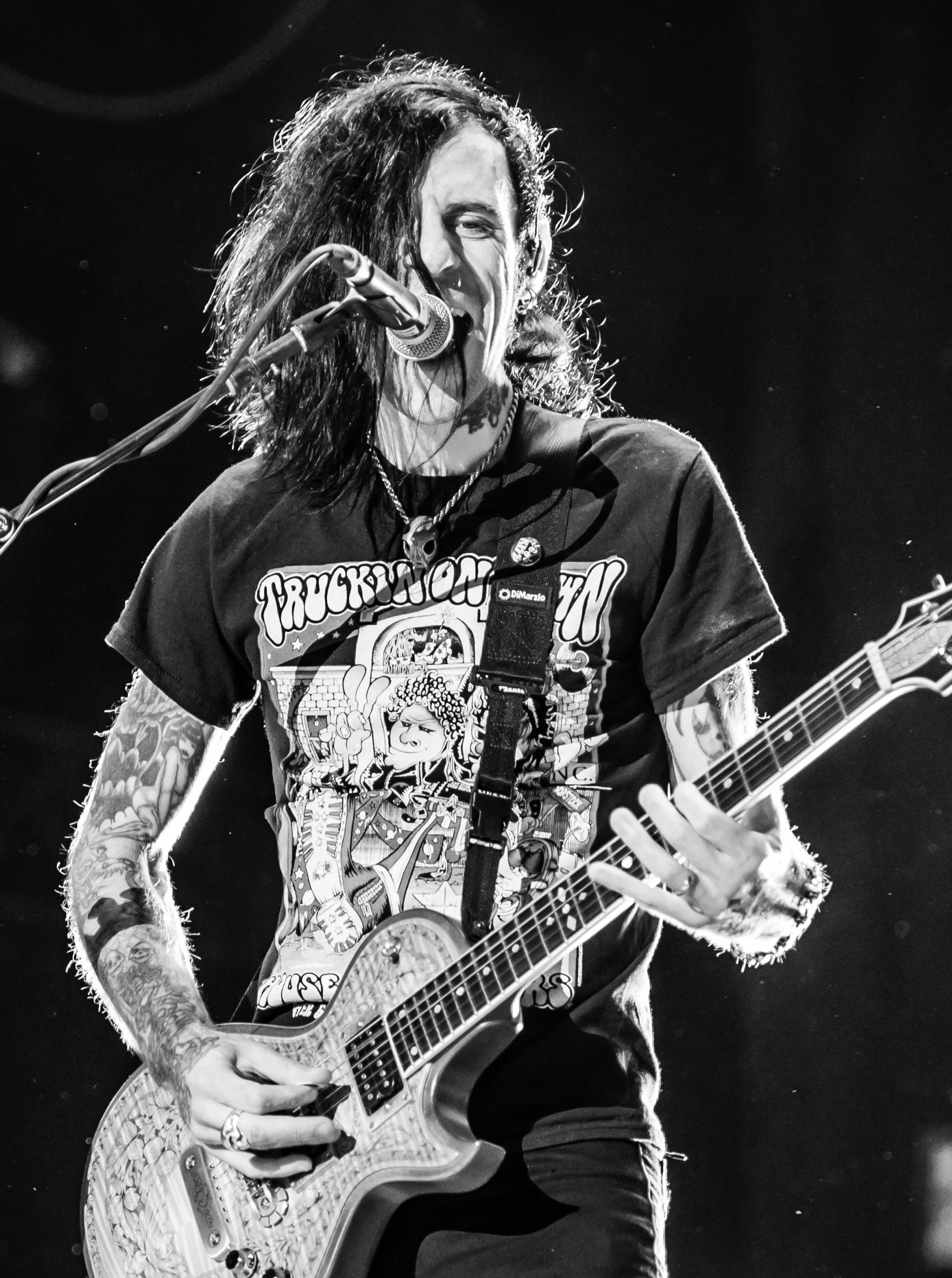
- Martucci performing with Stone Sour in 2018

Background information
- Born: Christopher Anthony Martucci; June 5, 1977 (age 48)
- Origin: Philadelphia, Pennsylvania, U.S.
- Genres: Hard rock; heavy metal; hardcore punk
- Occupation: Musician
- Instruments: Guitar; vocals
- Years active: 1995–present
- Website: christianmartucci.com

Christopher Anthony Martucci (born June 5, 1977), known professionally as Christian Martucci, is an American guitarist, vocalist, producer, and audio engineer. He is the lead guitarist for Stone Sour, Corey Taylor, and former member of Black Star Riders.

Martucci is a dual citizen of Italy and the United States. He was born in Philadelphia and was a founding member of Thousand Watt Stare, Black President, the Strychnine Babies and the Chelsea Smiles. Martucci was Dee Dee Ramone's guitarist from late 1999 to 2002 and appeared as "Chris the Creep" in Ramones's last book, Legend of a Rock Star, A Memoir: The Last Testament of Dee Dee Ramone. In 2014, he became the permanent replacement for Stone Sour's guitarist Jim Root. In September 2018, it was announced he would replace Damon Johnson as lead guitarist in Black Star Riders from January 2019.

In 2020, it was announced that Martucci would be joining Corey Taylors solo band. The band recorded 25 songs in 2 1/2 weeks live in the studio with producer Jay Ruston. The album CMFT was released in October 2020 by Roadrunner Records. Three years later, they followed up with the album, CMF2, released in September 2023.

In February 2021, Martucci formed the side project Dirty O'Keeffe with Billy Gould (Faith No More), Dave Raun (Lagwagon), and Steven Shepard (Trash N' Privilege). They released the single "Brick or Bullet" in 2021, followed by the four-song EP Heavy Water in 2022.

Martucci uses or has used guitars by a variety of brands including Gibson, Gretsch, Marvin, and Zemaitis. He uses Dimarzio pickups and Marshall amps.

In July 2024, Martucci began playing guitar for Seatle punk rock band, The Drowns.

In October of 2025, Martucci announced that he was stepping away from live music entirely for the first time in 30 years.

== Discography ==
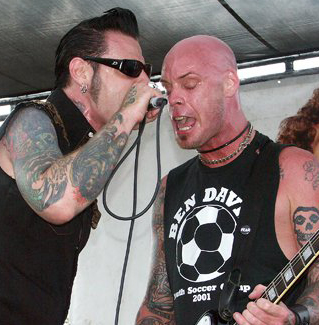
Martucci (left) with Black President in 2011

- 1996: Three Song Demo Tape – The Strychnine Babies – (Vocals, Guitar)
- 1997: Six Songs for Self Destruction EP – The Strychnine Babies – (Vocals, Bass)
- 1998: Kill Society/Dead Love 7" – The Strychnine Babies – (Vocals, Bass)
- 1998: This is American Punk, Vol. 1 – The Strychnine Babies – (Vocals, Bass)
- 2003: Toolbox Murders Soundtrack – California (Back To Hell) – Shithead – (Vocals)
- 2005: Nowhere Ride EP – The Chelsea Smiles – (Vocals, Guitar)
- 2006: Annapolis Soundtrack – Nowhere Ride – The Chelsea Smiles – (Vocals, Guitar)
- 2006: Flatout 2 In-Game Soundtrack – Nowhere Ride – The Chelsea Smiles – (Vocals, Guitar)
- 2007: Park Soundtrack – Nowhere Ride – The Chelsea Smiles – (Vocals, Guitar)
- 2008: Warped Tour 2008 Tour Compilation – Short List of Outspoken Suspects – Black President – (Vocals)
- 2008: Black President – Black President – (Vocals, Guitar)
- 2010: Thousand Watt Stare EP – Thousand Watt Stare – (Vocals, Guitar)
- 2011: Silver Dimes – Thousand Watt Stare – (Vocals, Guitar)
- 2012: Heavy Hearts Benefit Compilation – Lights Out – Thousand Watt Stare – (Vocals, Guitar)
- 2014: Ronnie James Dio This Is Your Life – Rainbow in the Dark – Corey Taylor, Roy Mayorga, Satchel, Christian Martucci, Jason Christopher – (Rhythm Guitar)
- 2015: Fear Clinic Soundtrack – The Dark – Stone Sour – (Lead Guitar)
- 2015: Meanwhile in Burbank... – Stone Sour – (Lead Guitar, Backing Vocals)
- 2015: Straight Outta Burbank... – Stone Sour – (Lead Guitar, Backing Vocals)
- 2017: Hydrograd – Stone Sour – (Lead Guitar, Backing Vocals)
- 2019: Get It Out – Altitudes & Attitude – (Lead Guitar)
- 2019: Another State of Grace – Black Star Riders – (Lead Guitar, Backing Vocals)
- 2019: Hello, You Bastards: Live in Reno – Stone Sour – (Lead Guitar, Backing Vocals)
- 2020: CMFT – Corey Taylor – (Guitar, Vocals)
- 2021: Brick Or Bullet – Dirty O'Keeffe – (Lead Vocals, Lead Guitar)
- 2021: The Innermost Journey to Your Outermost Mind – Sami Yaffa – (Lead Guitar)
- 2021: The Metallica Blacklist – Holier Than Thou – Corey Taylor – (Lead Guitar)
- 2022: CMFB ...Sides – Corey Taylor – (Lead Guitar, Backing Vocals)
- 2022: Heavy Water – Dirty O'Keeffe – (Vocals, Guitar)
- 2023: Wrong Side of Paradise – Black Star Riders – (Lead Guitar, Backing Vocals, Engineer)
- 2023: Pawn Shop Heart – Rich Jones feat. Christian Martucci – (Lead Vocals, Mixing, Mastering)
- 2023: CMF2 – Corey Taylor – (Lead Guitar, Backing Vocals)
- 2025: Live At Rebellion - The Drowns - (Lead Guitar, Backing Vocals)

== Filmography ==
- New York Doll (as Christian Black) (2005)
