= Roy Mayorga =

American drummer (born 1970)

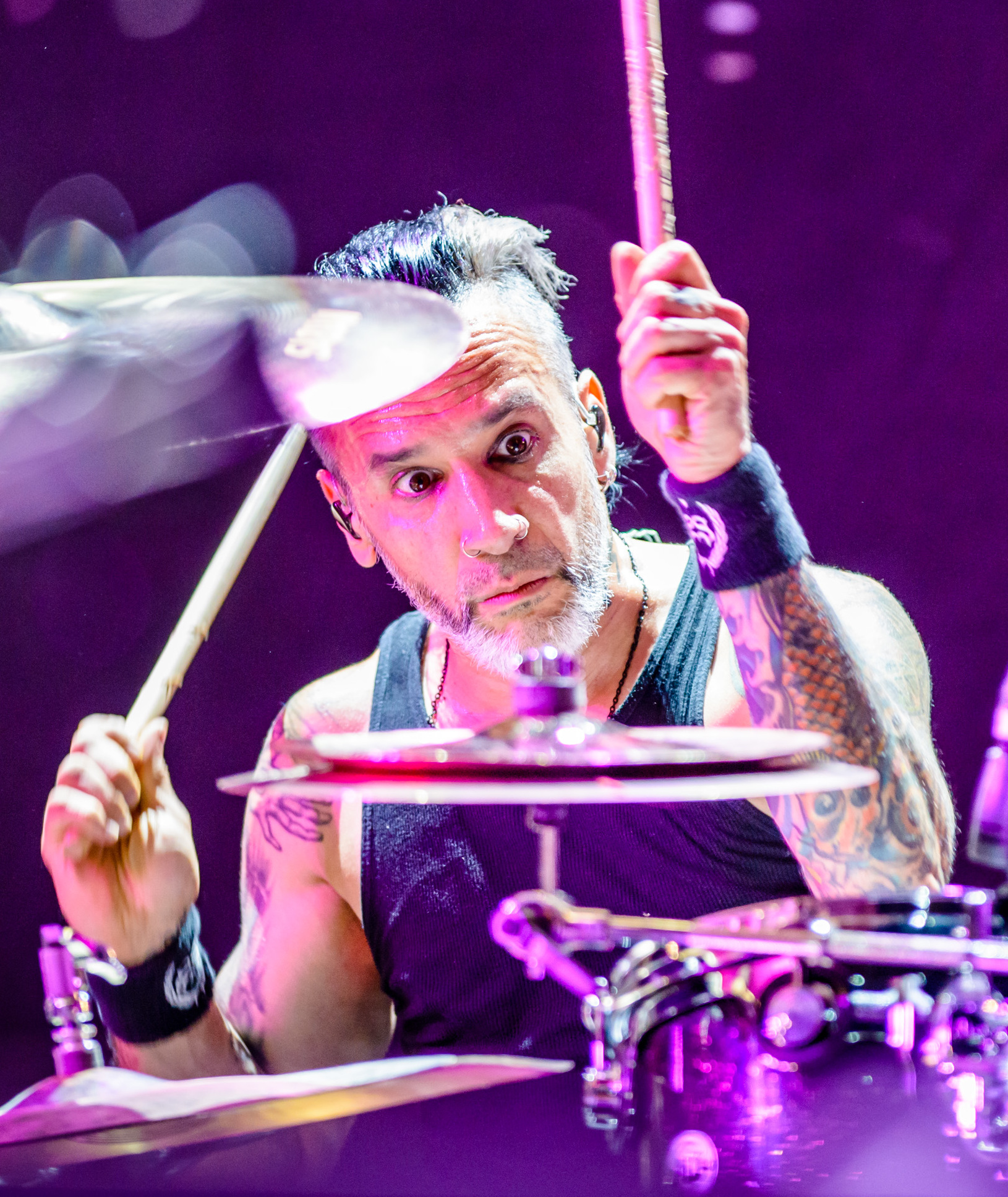
- Mayorga performing with Stone Sour in 2018

Background information
- Also known as: Rata
- Born: April 6, 1970 (age 56); New York City, U.S.
- Genres: Heavy metal; groove metal; thrash metal; death metal; hard rock; grindcore; crust punk; hardcore punk
- Occupation: Drummer
- Years active: 1985–present
- Member of: Ministry
- Formerly of: Amebix; Black President; Hellyeah; Medication; Nausea; Shelter; Soulfly; Stone Sour
- Website: roymayorga.com

Roy Mayorga (born April 6, 1970) is an American musician, best known as the drummer of heavy metal bands Soulfly, Hellyeah and Stone Sour and is currently the drummer for the sludge metal band Kylesa.

== Early life ==
Mayorga was born in Forest Hills, Queens, New York City, on April 6, 1970, to Cuban and Ecuadorian parents. At four years old, his family moved to Florida. While growing up, his parents would often play Motown music and rhythm and blues, which were his earliest exposures to music. He eventually became a fan of Kiss through his older brother, which led him to become interested in rock music. He began playing drums at six years old. His parents soon divorced, leading to him moving to Allentown, Pennsylvania, where he became involved in the local punk rock scene.

== Career ==
Mayorga formed his first band in 1985 in Allentown, called Youthquake. When Youthquake's bassist departed from the group, the remaining members formed Word Made Flesh, which Mayorga's brother eventually joined as guitarist.

Mayorga befriended the members of New York punk rock band Nausea while living in Allentown, which led to him becoming the band's drummer in 1988. The band released their debut album Extinction in 1990 through Profane Existence, which was accompanied by a European headline tour, and a tour in support of D.O.A. In the following year, the band recorded a number of songs for compilations, as well as the single "Cybergod". Additionally, the tour the U.S. west coast, with local support from Final Conflict, Neurosis, Asbestosdeath and Mindrot, before departing on a second European headline tour supported by the Radicts, however Nausea were unable to complete the final leg of the tour. In 1992, they released their final single "Lie Cycle", through Graven Image Records, before breaking up in the following months. While living in New York City, Mayorga began working as a live sound engineer for nightclubs such as CBGB, Wetlands, and Coney Island High.

After Nausea's breakup, Mayorga formed Thorn with Stephan Flam and ex-Nausea guitarist John John Jesse. After their fourth live performance, they signed to Roadrunner Records.

He also played with New York hardcore punk band Shelter in 1996. He also played drums on the album The Hollowing with metal band Crisis in 1996.

Mayorga formed the heavy metal band Soulfly in 1997, with former Sepultura vocalist Max Cavalera. He and Cavalera co-wrote much of the music for the band's self-titled debut album. He then departed from the band in 1999. In 2001, he rejoined the band, performing on their 2002 album 3, before leaving again in 2003 in protest of the firing of bassist Cello Dias.

He was briefly a member of the band Medication from 1999 to 2001.

In 2004, he helped create rock band Abloom as with vocalist Jasan Radford and lead guitarist Levon Sultanian. Also part of the band was Mike Doling (Snot, Soulfly) and John Fahnestock (Snot). Fahnestock left and was replaced by Marcelo Dias a.k.a. Marcello D. Rapp (Soulfly).

In 2005, he appeared as one of the drummers on the Roadrunner United compilation CD The All-Star Sessions, playing on "The Enemy", "The End", and "Baptized in the Redemption", all tracks being produced and musically written by Dino Cazares and Roy Mayorga. The song "The End" spawned a music video.

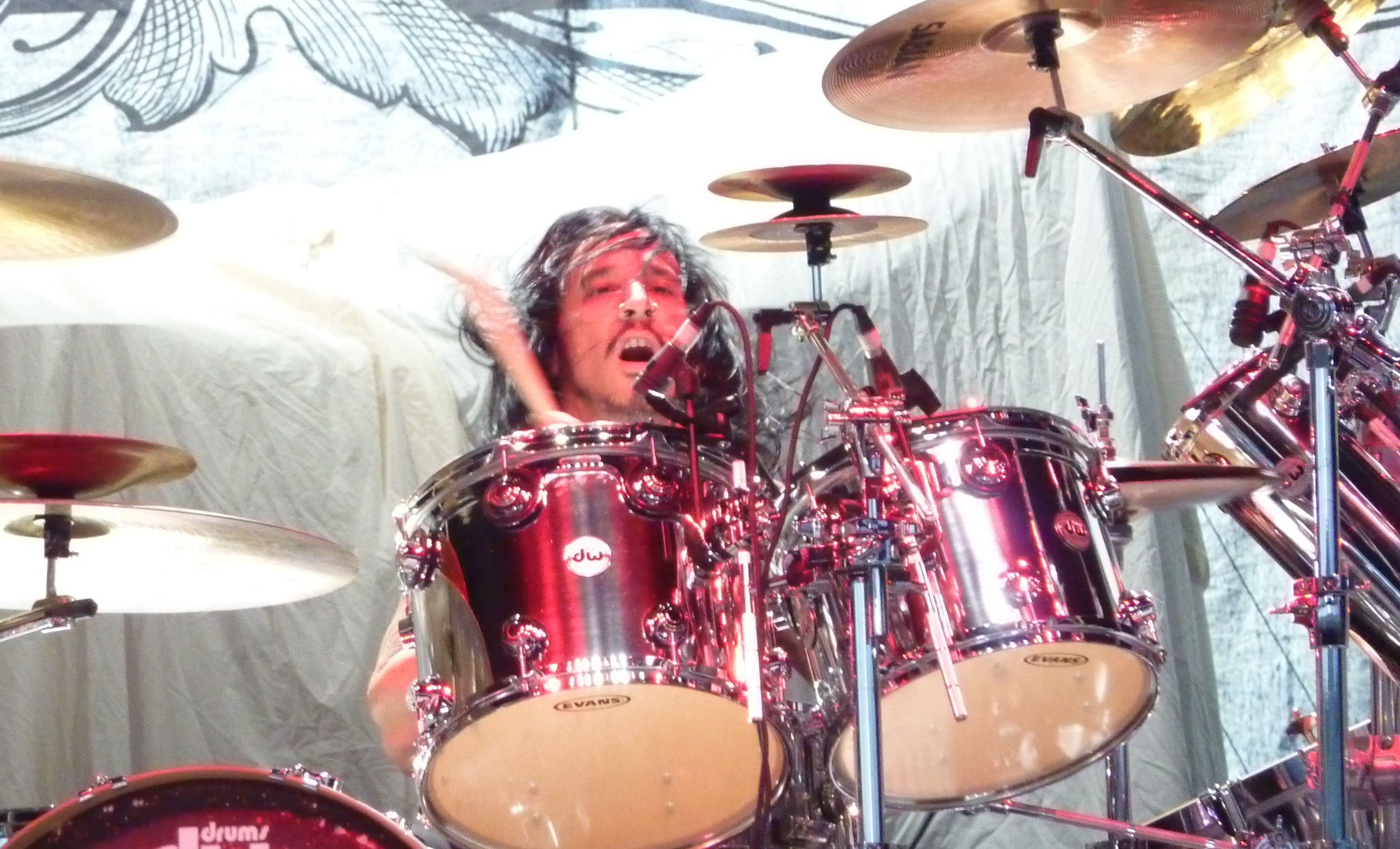
Mayorga performing in 2010

Mayorga also does classical film scoring, working on films such as Legion (2004) and Shudder (2007).

He temporarily filled in behind the drumkit for Sepultura's 2006 European tour with In Flames following Igor Cavalera's absence.

He officially joined Stone Sour on May 10, 2006, as a replacement for Joel Ekman. He drummed for their second release, Come What(ever) May, released in August 2006. The band toured for the next year and a half, releasing the Live in Moscow album exclusively to iTunes on August 14, 2007.

Roy Mayorga played drums for Amebix during their 2009 reunion tour until they broke up again in 2012.

In October 2013, Belgian metal band Channel Zero announced that, following the death of their drummer Phil Baheux, they will continue the work made on the new album, with Roy Mayorga playing the drums as a session drummer.

On May 6, 2019, Mayorga was announced as Hellyeah's new drummer for their May 11, 2019, performance honoring their previous drummer Vinnie Paul. while also announcing Welcome Home as the title of their next album and that the release date was pushed back to September 27.

In 2024, Mayorga joined Kylesa.

== Personal life ==
In May 2011, Mayorga suffered a stroke as a result of his frequent headbanging while drumming. The event led to him having to re-learn how to play drums.

== Discography ==
- 1986: Youthquake – Maximum Rock and Roll Compilation
- 1989: Nausea – They Don't Get Paid, They Don't Get Laid, But Boy Do They Work Hard
- 1989: Nausea – Squat or Rot Volume. 1
- 1990: Nausea – Extinction
- 1990: Nausea – Cybergod
- 1991: Nausea – More Songs About Plants and Trees
- 1991: Nausea – Lie Cycle
- 1992: Nausea – Discharged: From Home Front to War Front
- 1993: Thorn – Bitter Potion
- 1997: Crisis – The Hollowing
- 1998: Soulfly – Soulfly
- 2000: Dave Navarro – Trust No One
- 2002: Soulfly – 3
- 2004: Abloom – Abloom
- 2004: Nausea – The Punk Terrorist Anthology Vol. 1 (re-release)
- 2005: Roadrunner United – The All-Star Sessions
- 2006: Stone Sour – Come What(ever) May
- 2007: Black President – Black President
- 2010: Amebix – Redux
- 2010: Stone Sour – Audio Secrecy
- 2011: Amebix – Knights of the Black Sun 12"
- 2011: Amebix – Sonic Mass
- 2012: Stone Sour – House of Gold & Bones – Part 1
- 2013: Stone Sour – House of Gold & Bones – Part 2
- 2014: Channel Zero – Kill All Kings
- 2015: Stone Sour – Meanwhile in Burbank... (recorded in Mayorga's personal studio in Burbank, California)
- 2015: Stone Sour – Straight Outta Burbank... (recorded in Mayorga's personal studio in Burbank, California)
- 2017: Stone Sour – Hydrograd
- 2018: Ministry – AmeriKKKant (tracks 3, 8, 9)
- 2019: Ministry – Moral Hygiene (track 1)
- 2019: Mark Morton – Anesthetic (tracks 4, 7, 10)
- 2024: Star Stunted II - Mahogany Wood
- 2024: Ministry – Hopiumforthemasses (tracks 1, 3, 6)
- 2024: Melvins - Tarantula Heart
- 2025: Ministry – The Squirrely Years Revisited

Producer/Engineer credits

- 1994: Chaos B.C. remix (Sepultura)
- 1995: Sun to Sun (The Spitters)
- 1997: Kicks Joy Darkness (Karouac)
- 1997: Eye for an Eye remix (Soulfly)
- 1998: Tribe remix (Soulfly)
- 2012: No Rules EP (Lody Kong)

Film score

- 2004: Legion
- 2007: Shudder
- 2024: Little Bites
