= Corey Taylor =

American musician (born 1973)

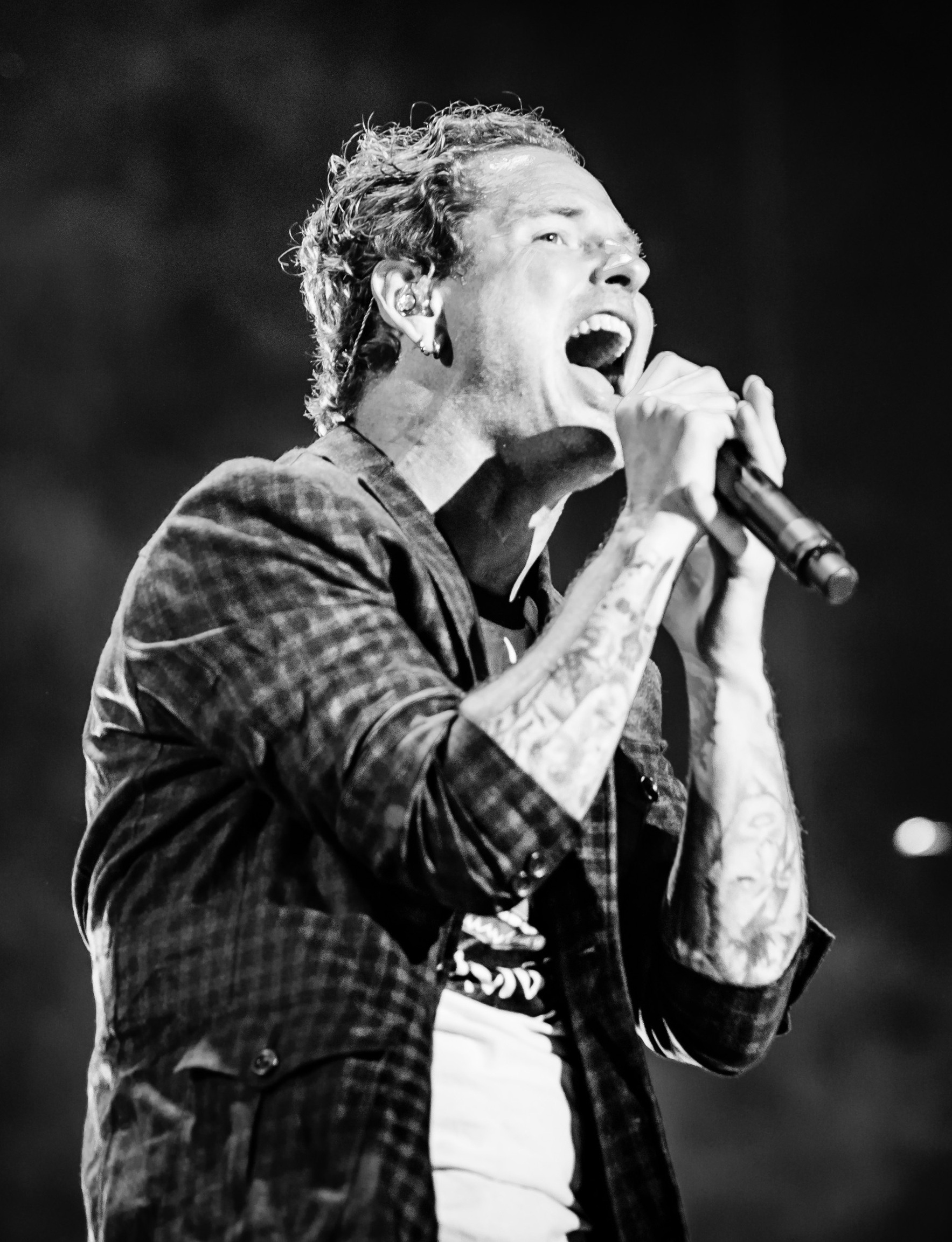
- Taylor performing with Stone Sour in 2018
- Born: Corey Todd Taylor; December 8, 1973 (age 52); Des Moines, Iowa, U.S.
- Other names: #8; Great Big Mouth; Todd Tigger; The Boogie Knight; Neck
- Occupations: Singer; musician; songwriter; actor; author
- Years active: 1992–present
- Spouses: Scarlett Stone (m. 2004; div. 2007) Stephanie Luby (m. 2009; div. 2017) Alicia Dove (m. 2019)
- Children: 3
- Musical career
- Origin: Waterloo, Iowa, U.S.
- Genres: Nu metal; alternative metal; groove metal; heavy metal; hard rock; post-grunge
- Instruments: Vocals; guitar
- Labels: Roadrunner; BMG
- Member of: Slipknot
- Formerly of: Roadrunner United; Junk Beer Kidnap Band; Sound City Players; Kings of Chaos; Stone Sour
- Website: thecoreytaylor.com

Corey Todd Taylor (born December 8, 1973) is an American musician. He is best known as the lead vocalist of the heavy metal band Slipknot, in which he is designated #8, as well as the lead vocalist and guitarist of the rock band Stone Sour.

Taylor co-founded Stone Sour with drummer Joel Ekman in March 1992, playing in the Des Moines, Iowa area, and working on a demo. He joined Slipknot in late 1997 to replace their original lead singer Anders Colsefni and has subsequently released seven studio albums with them. After the first two Slipknot albums went Platinum, Taylor revived Stone Sour to record an album and tour in 2002. His debut solo studio album, CMFT, was released in 2020. His second solo studio album, CMF2, was released in 2023.

Taylor has also worked with several other artists and bands, including Junk Beer Kidnap Band, Korn, Disturbed, Apocalyptica, Code Orange, Lamb of God, Anthrax, Avenged Sevenfold, Serj Tankian, Steel Panther, Tonight Alive, Falling in Reverse, Soulfly, Damageplan, Tech N9ne, Ho99o9, Wargasm, the Clay People, and Motionless in White.

== Early life ==
Corey Todd Taylor was born on December 8, 1973, in Des Moines, Iowa. He was mostly raised by his single mother in Waterloo, Iowa, and described it as a "hole in the ground with buildings around it". He is of German, Irish and Native American descent on his father's side, and Dutch and Irish on his mother's side. Taylor, along with his mother and younger half-sister, would often move around the country in search for job prospects. By the time he was 15, he had "already lived in 25 states". Around 1979, Taylor and his mother saw the sci-fi series Buck Rogers in the 25th Century. Before the series, there was a trailer for the 1978 horror film Halloween. Taylor said this "developed some sense of Slipknot in [himself]". While Halloween introduced Taylor to masks and horror themes, Taylor's grandmother introduced him to rock music, showing him a collection of Elvis Presley records from the 1950s to 1970s. He especially found songs like "Teddy Bear", "In the Ghetto", and "Suspicious Minds" to appeal to his interests the most, describing them as "good times". Taylor also began listening to Black Sabbath at a young age, beginning with their early work. He decided he wanted to become a singer when he and his cousin were singing along to Journey's "Separate Ways".

In 1983, when he was nine years old, his mother and her boyfriend moved to Fort Lauderdale, Florida, to become security guards for Burt Reynolds' ranch. However, as they were driving there, they got stranded in Georgia and he lost some of his possessions. By age 15, he had developed a drug addiction and had overdosed on cocaine twice. By this time, he was living in Waterloo, but some time after this overdose, he returned to visit his grandmother in Des Moines, and according to Taylor, "stayed and never went back [to his mother's house]." She took legal custody of him so that he could continue going to school, and she helped him buy musical equipment. He would later describe his grandmother as his "strongest influence" as well as his "rock, foundation and stability." When Taylor was 18, he left his grandmother's house and went to various places in Iowa, Des Moines being a place to which he frequently returned. Taylor attended Lincoln High School in Des Moines but did not graduate. He later earned his GED.

In 2017, on an episode of Viceland's The Therapist, Taylor revealed that he was sexually abused at the age of 10 by a 16-year-old friend. Taylor stated that he never told anyone about the incident until he was "probably 18" because his abuser had "...threatened to hurt me and threatened to hurt my mom". At age 17, when Taylor was living with his grandmother, he attempted suicide by way of overdose. His ex-girlfriend's mother drove him to the hospital in Des Moines and doctors were able to resuscitate him. He describes this as the lowest point in his life.

== Music career ==
=== Stone Sour ===
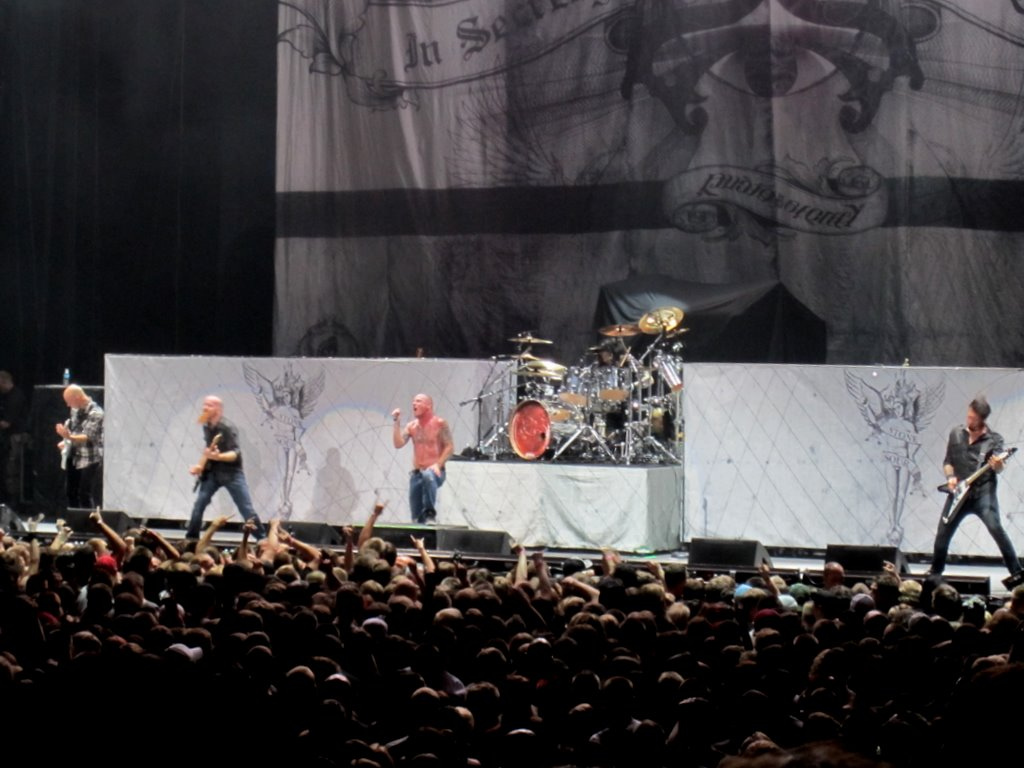
Stone Sour performing in 2010

Taylor is a founding member of American hard rock band Stone Sour. After he formed the band in 1992 with drummer Joel Ekman, Shawn Economaki joined filling in the bass position, leaving the electric guitar position to be filled by Josh Rand. Stone Sour recorded a demo album in 1993, and another in 1994. In 1997, Taylor was approached by the metal band, Slipknot, resulting in him abandoning Stone Sour while they were recording a demo album with Sean McMahon at SR studios. Taylor did not return until five years later to record their debut album, Stone Sour in 2002. Both Taylor and guitarist Josh Rand contacted Jim Root, Slipknot's guitarist, and Shawn Economaki, Stone Sour's original bassist, to begin writing songs for their debut album. Drummer Joel Ekman came back on board as well. This "reformation" later resulted in Stone Sour recording at Catamount Studios in Cedar Falls, Iowa.

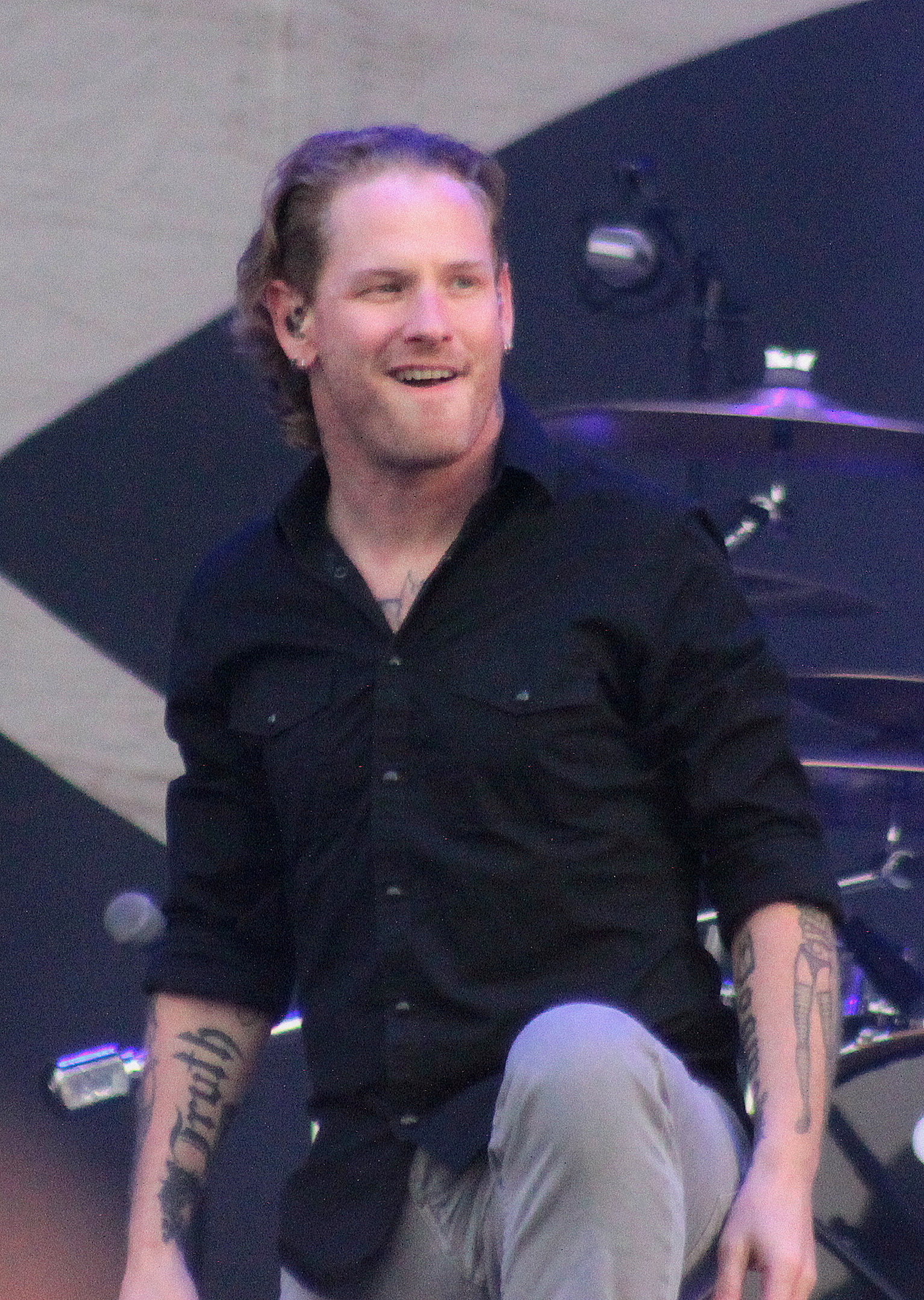
Taylor performing with Stone Sour in 2013

Their self-titled debut album was released August 27, 2002, and it debuted at number 46 on the Billboard 200. Their second album, Come What(ever) May debuted at number four on the Billboard 200. It was released August 1, 2006, and charted on several different charts. Live in Moscow is currently their only album specifically released only for download. During the recording of the album, drummer Joel Ekman left the band for personal reasons. As a result, drummer Roy Mayorga was recruited, taking his place. The group released their third studio album, Audio Secrecy, on September 7, 2010.

Later, Corey Taylor announced the release of a concept double album with Stone Sour. The albums are titled "House of Gold & Bones". During the process of making the double album, bassist Shawn Economaki left the band. He was temporarily replaced for touring purposes by Johny Chow. The first part was released in October 2012 and the second part in April 2013. There are 23 songs in total, 11 on the first part and 12 on the second. In addition to these two albums is a four-part comic book series written by Taylor and published by Dark Horse Comics, which went on sale in 2013. With these albums came a story that was written by Taylor that coincide with the album. Fans can also construct a miniature "house of gold and bones" from the packaging design of the physical versions of the two albums. Taylor has also said that he would like to finish off the project by making the story into a movie but nothing has come of this yet.

=== Slipknot ===
In Des Moines, Iowa, Joey Jordison, Shawn Crahan, and Mick Thomson approached him asking him to join Slipknot. He agreed to go to one of their practices, and ended up singing in front of them. Of Slipknot's nine members, Corey was the sixth to join the band. Performing with Slipknot, he would also come to be known as "Number Eight", since the band follows a numbering scheme for its members, ranging from 0–8. According to Shawn Crahan, Corey wanted number eight, because it symbolizes infinity.

Feeling he could expand more inside Slipknot than in Stone Sour, Taylor temporarily quit Stone Sour, even though they were recording an album with Sean McMahon. Taylor's first gig with Slipknot was on August 24, 1997, which according to band members did not go well. During his first gig, Taylor was performing with facepaint instead of a mask; however, for his second show on September 12, he wore a mask that resembles his debut album mask. Taylor has recorded with Slipknot since the release of their second demo album, a self-titled demo used to promote the band to prospective labels and producers. As their permanent vocalist, he recorded with Slipknot at Indigo Ranch in Malibu, California, and released Slipknot, the band's debut album that peaked at number one on the Top Heatseekers chart, went double platinum in the United States, and was included in the 2006 book 1001 Albums You Must Hear Before You Die. Taylor was accused of copyright infringement regarding the lyrics of the song "Purity", but no action was taken. Taylor began recording for their second studio album, Iowa, in 2001 at Sound City and Sound Image in Van Nuys, Los Angeles. It was released August 28, 2001, and peaked at number one on the UK Albums Chart, as well as number three on the Billboard 200. While writing Vol. 3: (The Subliminal Verses), Taylor decided to write lyrics that would not warrant an explicit label. It peaked at number two on the Billboard 200. All Hope Is Gone was the first Slipknot album to peak at number one on the Billboard 200.

=== Other work ===
Taylor has appeared as a guest musician on albums by Soulfly, Apocalyptica, Damageplan, Steel Panther, and Code Orange. He was planning to record vocals on thrash metal band Anthrax's album, Worship Music, but Slipknot's record label, Roadrunner Records, did not allow him to. He also contributed to the Roadrunner United all-star album in 2005, providing vocals for the song "Rich Man". Taylor also made a brief appearance in Steel Panther's singles "Death to All but Metal", "Eyes of a Panther", and "Asian Hooker". In 2006, Taylor founded the record company Great Big Mouth Records. Taylor has produced two albums: Facecage's self-titled album and Walls of Jericho's Redemption. Taylor provided guest narration on the track "Repentance" for Dream Theater's 2007 album Systematic Chaos. In an interview with Billboard, Taylor confirmed that on January 13, 2009, he was planning on making a solo album, as well as returning to his side project Stone Sour after Slipknot's All Hope Is Gone World Tour. Taylor has stated that he was writing songs that "don't fit either of his main bands." He describes them as a cross between Foo Fighters, Johnny Cash, and Social Distortion, saying that there's "a country background that comes built-in with living in Iowa".

On March 30, 2009, it was confirmed that Taylor and the Junk Beer Kidnap Band would be performing at Rockfest in 2009. The group performed on April 24, 2009, at People's Court in Des Moines, Iowa, marking Taylor's first official solo show. Taylor performs with his band the Dum Fux with Denny Harvey, who make covers for 1970s punk rock and 1980s hair metal. Taylor also performs with Audacious P, a band that is primarily a Tenacious D cover band. Rapper Tech N9ne confirmed that Taylor was to perform on his album K.O.D., but was removed because Taylor did not submit his vocals in time, though he would later make an appearance on Tech's 2015 album Special Effects, on the song "Wither". Taylor recently admitted that he tried out for the vacant singer spot in the band Velvet Revolver, but said that it just did not work out. However, according to a recent Billboard article, it seems likely that he may in fact become the vocalist for Velvet Revolver, though no official confirmation has been made. Duff McKagan added that they can neither "confirm or deny" Taylor's membership in the band but believes that Taylor is the "real deal". Slash has since ruled Taylor out as the possible new vocalist explaining that "[it] just wasn't right" although he does love him. Taylor has, however, recorded 10 new songs with the band, although drummer Matt Sorum stated it is unlikely they will ever be released. Taylor explained to Mark Hoppus on Hoppus on Music that he and McKagan were writing new music for a possible new supergroup.

On June 21, 2018, Taylor featured on the track "The Hunt" by metallic hardcore band Code Orange, the second track of the three-track EP The Hurt Will Go On. In April 2019, Taylor collaborated on the song "Drugs" by the band Falling in Reverse. In September 2019, he and his son Griffin were featured on Nostalgia Critic's parody album of Pink Floyd's The Wall on a cover of the opening theme for SpongeBob SquarePants. Taylor released his solo album, CMFT, on October 2, 2020, via Roadrunner Records. The first two singles, "Black Eyes Blue" and "CMFT Must Be Stopped", were released on July 29, 2020. Despite charting relatively well, he would later accuse Roadrunner of doing little to promote CMFT.

Taylor mentioned in an October 3, 2020, interview about a followup album entitled CMF2, which would be completed prior to a tour supporting both it and CMFT. He contributed a cover of the Metallica song "Holier Than Thou" to the charity tribute album The Metallica Blacklist, released in September 2021.

Between January 18 and March 6, 2023, Taylor spent time at various studios working on CMF2. On April 27, 2023, Taylor signed a new record deal with BMG Rights Management to distribute CMF2, which will be released through his own imprint label, Decibel Cooper Recordings. The first single from the album, "Beyond", was released on May 16, 2023.

In 2024, Taylor appeared on Bear McCreary's epic rock concept album, graphic novel, and concert experience - "The Singularity".

In 2026, Taylor appeared on Motionless in White's album “Decades” on the song “Playing God” and he also appeared on the Falling in Reverse song "Joseph" along with Serj Tankian of System of a Down.

== Style and influence ==
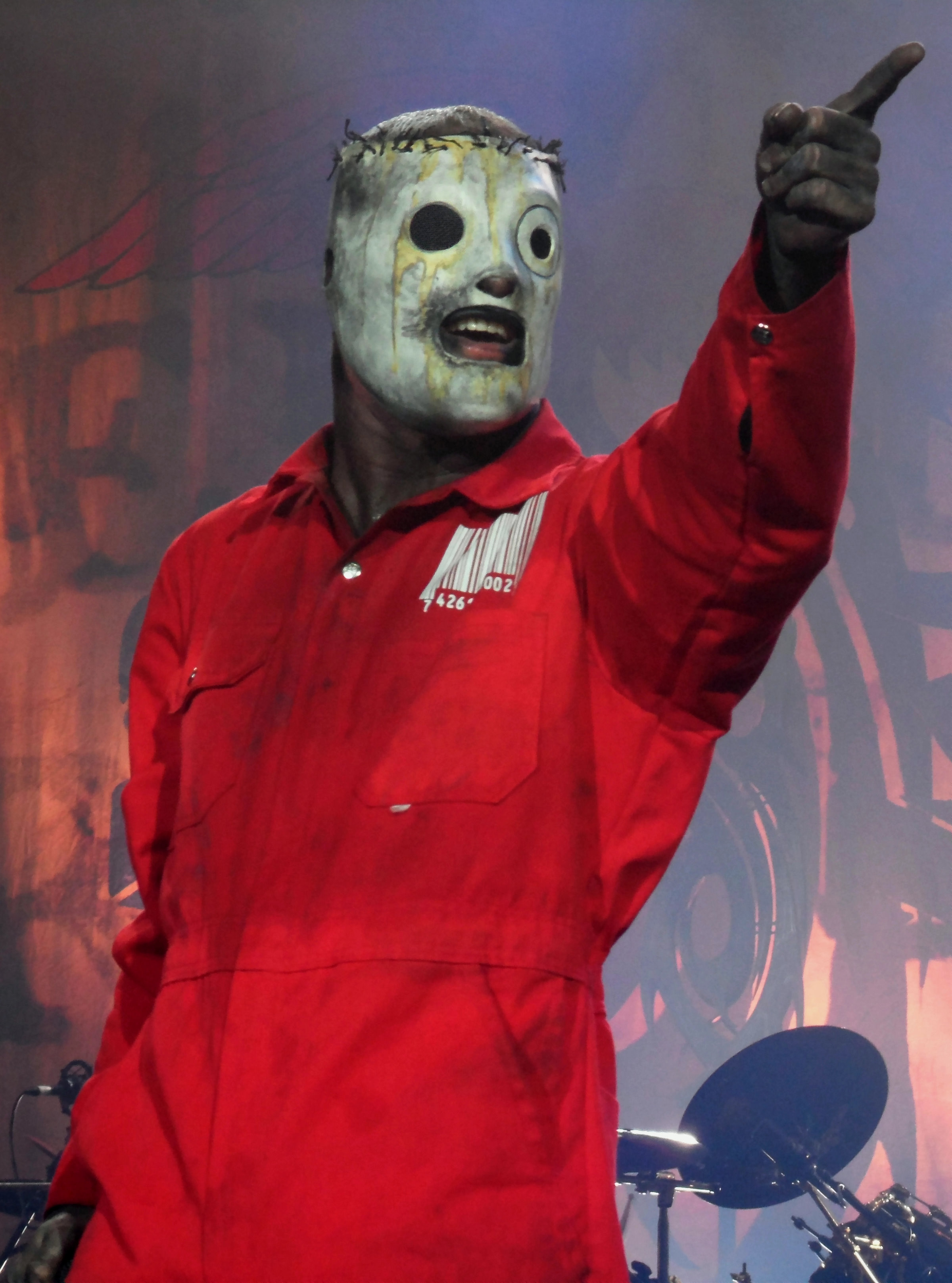
Taylor performing with Slipknot in 2011

Taylor told Loudwire in 2015 that if it were not for Faith No More, he "wouldn't be here today". While recovering from an attempted suicide, he saw the band perform "Epic" live on the 1990 MTV Video Music Awards and the performance inspired him to begin writing and performing music again. He has also stated that Pearl Jam had hugely influenced and inspired his music, saying that the group was "one of the biggest and best rock bands of all time".

The first two Slipknot albums with Taylor's vocals, Slipknot and Iowa, both contain substantial explicit content. Many critics claimed Taylor relied on profanity, culminating in Slipknot's third album, Vol. 3: (The Subliminal Verses) largely lacking the use of swearing and not warranting the explicit label. Compared with the previous vocalist for Slipknot, Anders Colsefni, Taylor has a vocal style that was characterized by the late, ex-drummer Joey Jordison as "really good melodic singing". Taylor's vocal style, which contains at times melodic singing, growling, screaming, shouting, and rapping, led him to place at number 86 on the Hit Parader's Top 100 Metal Vocalists of All Time and is often compared to other vocalists such as Ivan Moody, John Bush, Phil Anselmo, and Jamey Jasta.

In 2025, Stephen Andrew Galiher of Vice included him in his list of "4 Metal Vocalists Who Mastered Both Screaming and Singing".

== Personal life ==
On September 17, 2002, Taylor's then-fiancée, Scarlett, gave birth to their son, Griffin Parker Taylor who later became the lead vocalist in nu metal band Vended. Taylor also has a daughter from an earlier relationship. Taylor and Scarlett married on March 11, 2004, and divorced in 2007. On November 13, 2009, Taylor married Stephanie Luby at the Palms Hotel in Las Vegas. They had a daughter, but separated in 2017. On April 7, 2019, it was announced on his Instagram page that he became engaged to Alicia Dove, creator of the dance and performance group "Cherry Bombs". On October 6, 2019, the pair married.

Taylor has had problems with alcoholism, which Scarlett helped him through as well as keeping him from attempting suicide. In 2006, Taylor told MTV that he had came close to jumping off a balcony of the eighth floor of The Hyatt on Sunset Boulevard in 2003, but "somehow [Scarlett] stopped me". This was later recanted by Taylor in an interview with Kerrang! radio, where he instead stated that it was his friend Thom Hazaert who physically stopped him from jumping. Scarlett then told him that either he would have to get sober or she would annul their marriage. Before Stone Sour started recording Come What(ever) May in January 2006, Taylor was sober.

On August 3, 2009, he co-hosted the 2009 Kerrang! Awards alongside Scott Ian of Anthrax. The following year, they both once again co-hosted the Kerrang! Awards, where Taylor collected the K! Services to Metal award on behalf of Paul Gray, who died after an accidental overdose of morphine and fentanyl.

In early September 2010, Taylor announced that his book, Seven Deadly Sins: Settling the Argument Between Born Bad and Damaged Good, would be released on July 12, 2011, through Da Capo Press.

Taylor politically identifies as a centrist and is also strongly opposed to cancel culture. In an interview with The Guardian in 2016, Taylor stated he was supporting Bernie Sanders.

He divides his time between homes in Des Moines, Iowa and Las Vegas, Nevada.

In 2016, he had to have surgery in his neck after, in his own words, he "broke [his] neck a while back [and] didn't realize it".

In April 2020, Taylor auctioned off 13 of his personal guitars to benefit Direct Relief's COVID-19 efforts, aiming to support healthcare workers and those impacted by the pandemic.

== Solo band members ==
Current members

- Corey Taylor – vocals, guitar (2008–present), piano (2020–present)
- Christian Martucci – guitar, backing vocals (2010, 2011, 2015, 2016–2017, 2020–present)
- Zach Throne – guitar, backing vocals (2019–2021, 2021–present)
- Dustin Robert – drums (2019, 2020–present)
- Eliot Lorango – bass, backing vocals (2021–present)

Former members

- Nik Sorak – guitar, backing vocals (2008–2010)
- Fred Missouri – bass (2008–2009)
- Tyson Leslie – keyboard, guitar, backing vocals (2008–2009)
- Thomas Doggett – saxophone, wind synthesizer, backing vocals (2008–2009)
- Ryan Berrier – drums (2008–2009)
- Jason Christopher – bass, backing vocals (2009–2010, 2011, 2019–2021), guitar, backing vocals (2010, 2011–2012, 2015, 2018)
- Roy Mayorga – drums (2010, 2011)
- Arejay Hale – drums (2011)
- Brandon Pertzborn – drums (2019)
- R.J. Ronquillo – guitar, backing vocals (2021)

== Discography ==
=== Studio albums ===
List of studio albums, with selected chart positions and sales figures
Title	Album details	Peak chart positions					Sales
Title	Album details	US	AUS	CAN	GER	UK	Sales
CMFT	Released: October 2, 2020; Label: Roadrunner; Formats: CD, LP, DL	44	8	46	9	11	US: 52,000
CMF2	Released: September 15, 2023; Label: Decibel Cooper/BMG; Formats: CD, LP, DL	—	70	—	12	17	
"—" denotes items which were not released in that country or failed to chart.

=== Compilation albums ===
Title	Album details
CMF2B... or Not 2B	Released: April 20, 2024; Label: BMG; Formats: LP, DL

=== EPs ===
Title	Album details
CMFB ...Sides	Released: February 25, 2022; Label: Roadrunner; Formats: CD, DL

=== Singles ===
==== As lead artist ====
Title	Year	Peak chart positions					Album
Title	Year	US Alt.	US Main.	US Rock	US Rock Digital	CAN Rock	Album
"X-M@$"	2010	—	37	42	—	44	Non-album single
"From Can to Can't" (with Dave Grohl, Rick Nielsen, Scott Reeder)	2013	36	2	20	—	9	Sound City: Real to Reel
"London Calling"	2013	—	—	—	—	—	Non-album single
"Black Eyes Blue"	2020	—	1	11	—	29	CMFT
"CMFT Must Be Stopped" (feat. Tech N9ne and Kid Bookie)	2020	—	—	—	23	—	CMFT
"HWY 666"	2020	—	—	—	—	—	CMFT
"Culture Head"	2020	—	—	—	—	—	CMFT
"All This and More"	2020	—	—	—	—	—	CMFB ...Sides
"Samantha's Gone"	2021	—	10	27	—	50	CMFT
"Thunder Force" (with Fil Eisler and Lzzy Hale feat. Scott Ian, Dave Lombardo, Tina Guo)	2021	—	—	—	—	—	Thunder Force soundtrack
"Carry On"	2021	—	—	—	—	—	Non-album single
"Holier than Thou"	2021	—	—	—	—	—	The Metallica Blacklist
"On the Dark Side"	2022	—	—	—	—	—	CMFB ...Sides
"Beyond"	2023	—	1	6	—	14	CMF2
"Post Traumatic Blues"	2023	—	—	—	—	—	CMF2
"Talk Sick"	2023	—	—	—	—	—	CMF2
"We Are the Rest"	2023	—	17	—	—	—	CMF2
"Dust in the Wind" (feat. Bad Omens and Aaron Gilhuis)	2025	—	—	—	—	—	Queen of the Ring soundtrack

==== As featured artist ====
List of singles, with selected chart positions, showing year released and album name
Title	Year	Peak chart positions										Album
Title	Year	FIN	GER	GER Rock	US Alt.	US Main.	US Rock	US Rock Digital	UK	UK Rock	CZE Rock	Album
"Jumpdafuckup" (Soulfly featuring Corey Taylor)	2001	—	—	—	—	—	—	—	—	—	—	Primitive
"I'm Not Jesus" (Apocalyptica featuring Corey Taylor)	2007	15	55	—	15	6	—	—	149	2	—	Worlds Collide
"Death to All But Metal" (Steel Panther featuring Corey Taylor)	2009	—	—	—	—	—	—	—	—	—	—	Feel the Steel
"Fairies Wear Boots" (live) (Zakk Sabbath with Corey Taylor)	2016	—	—	—	—	—	—	—	—	—	—	Non-album single
"A Different World" (Korn featuring Corey Taylor)	2016	—	—	—	—	—	—	19	—	—	—	The Serenity of Suffering
"Drugs" (Falling in Reverse featuring Corey Taylor)	2019	—	—	1	—	—	21	—	—	—	—	Non-album single
"Maybe It's Time" (Sixx:A.M. featuring Joe Elliott, Brantley Gilbert, Ivan Moody, Slash, Corey Taylor, Awolnation and Tommy Vext)	2020	—	—	—	—	—	12	44	—	—	12	Sno Babies soundtrack
"Murder Ballad II" (The Dead Deads featuring Corey Taylor)	2021	—	—	—	—	—	—	—	—	—	—	Tell Your Girls It's Alright
"Game" (Kid Bookie featuring Corey Taylor)	2022	—	—	—	—	—	—	—	—	—	—	Mass Hysteria
"Nothing to Some" (Flat Black featuring Corey Taylor)	2024	—	—	—	—	—	—	—	—	—	—	Dark Side of the Brain
"Incite the Watch" (Billy Morrison featuring Corey Taylor and Steve Vai)	2024	—	—	—	—	—	—	—	—	—	—	The Morrison Project
"70% Dead" (Wargasm featuring Corey Taylor)	2024	—	—	—	—	—	—	—	—	—	—	Non-album single
"Playing God" (Motionless In White featuring Corey Taylor)	2026	—	—	—	—	—	—	—	—	—	—	Decades
"Joseph" (Falling in Reverse featuring Corey Taylor and Serj Tankian)	2026	—	—	—	—	—	—	—	71	9	—	Non-album single
"—" denotes a recording that did not chart or was not released in that territory.

=== Guest appearances ===
Year	Band	Album	Songs	Role	Ref
1998	Sister Soleil	Soularium	"Liar"	Backing vocals	
1998	Smakdab	Smakdab	"Shadowed"	Vocals	
2000	Soulfly	Primitive	"Jumpdafuckup"	Vocals	
2000	Snot	Strait Up	"Requiem"	Vocals	
2001	Biohazard	Uncivilization	"Domination"	Backing vocals	
2001	Slitheryn	Snake; Slitheryn	"Lost", "Get Up", "Come + Go"	Vocals, backing vocals, producer	
2002	Rollins Band	Rise Above	"Rise Above", "Room 13", "TV Party", "Six Pack", "Annihilate This Week"	Vocals, backing vocals	
2004	Damageplan	New Found Power	"Fuck You"	Vocals	
2005	Roadrunner United	The All-Star Sessions	"The Rich Man"	Vocals	
2006	Korn	Family Values Tour 2006	"Freak on a Leash" (Live 2006)	Backing vocals	
2006	FaceCage	III	—	Producer	
2007	Dream Theater	Systematic Chaos	"Repentance"	Spoken word contribution	
2007	Apocalyptica	Worlds Collide	"I'm Not Jesus"	Vocals	
2008	Walls of Jericho	Redemption	"Ember Drive", "My Last Stand", "Addicted"	Vocals, guitar, producer	
2009	Steel Panther	Feel the Steel	"Death to All But Metal", "Asian Hooker", "Eyes of a Panther"	Vocals	
2010	Johnny Aloha	Lavapalooza (Tiki Music Versions of Rock And Rap Hits!)	Almost Paradise	Vocals	
2011	Travis Barker	Give the Drummer Some	"On My Own"	Vocals, guitars, producer	
2013	Corey Taylor, Dave Grohl, Rick Nielsen, Scott Reeder	Sound City: Real to Reel	"From Can to Can't"	Vocals	
2014	Corey Taylor, Jason Christopher, Christian Martucci, Roy Mayorga, Satchel	This Is Your Life – A Tribute to Ronnie James Dio	"Rainbow in the Dark"	Vocals, producer	
2015	Tech N9ne	Special Effects	"Wither"	Vocals	
2016	Zakk Wylde	Book of Shadows II	"Sleeping Dogs"	Vocals	
2016	Zakk Sabbath	Fairies Wear Boots (Live Bootleg: Los Angeles '16)	"Fairies Wear Boots" (Live 2016)	Vocals	
2016	Korn	The Serenity of Suffering	"A Different World"	Vocals	
2018	Tonight Alive	Underworld	"My Underworld"	Vocals	
2018	Code Orange	The Hurt Will Go On	"The Hunt"	Vocals	
2019	Falling in Reverse	—	"Drugs"	Vocals	
2019	Doug Walker	Nostalgia Critic's the Wall	"SpongeBob Theme"	Vocals	
2020	Posehn	Grandpa Metal	"The Fox (What Does the Fox Say?)"	Vocals	
2020	Me and that Man	New Man, New Songs, Same Shit, Vol.1	"How Come?"	Vocals	
2020	Avatar	Hunter Gatherer	"Colossus", "A Secret Door", "Wormhole"	Vocals, whistle, writing	
2020	John 5	Live Invasion	"Take Your Whiskey Home"	Vocals	
2020	Sixx:A.M.	Sno Babies soundtrack	"Maybe It's Time"	Vocals	
2020	Moonshine Bandits	Fire	"Live the Madness"	Vocals	
2021	Charlie Benante	Silver Linings	"Funny Vibe"	Vocals	
2021	The Dead Deads	Tell Your Girls It's Alright	"Murder Ballad II"	Vocals, writing	
2021	Corey Taylor	The Metallica Blacklist	"Holier Than Thou"	Vocals	
2021	ZillaKami	Dog Boy	"Chewing Gum!"	Spoken word	
2021	Kid Bookie	Cheaper Than Therapy	"Stuck in My Ways"	Vocals	
2022	Hyro the Hero	Kids Against the Monsters	"Kids Against the Monsters"	Vocals	
2022	Kid Bookie	Mass Hysteria	"Game"	Vocals	
2024	Flat Black	Dark Side of the Brain	"Nothing to Some"	Vocals	
2024	Bear McCreary	The Singularity	"Leviathan"	Vocals	
2024	Wargasm		"70% Dead"	Vocals	
2026	Motionless in White	Decades	"Playing God"	Vocals	
2026	Falling in Reverse, Serj Tankian		"Joseph"	Vocals	
"—" denotes a recording that did not chart or was not released in that territory.

== Filmography ==
Year	Film	Character	Director	Notes
1999	Welcome to Our Neighborhood	Himself	Thomas Mignone	
2001	We Sold Our Souls for Rock 'n Roll	Himself	Penelope Spheeris	
2002	Rollerball	Himself	John McTiernan	
2002	Disasterpieces	Himself	Matthew Amos	
2006	Voliminal: Inside the Nine	Himself	Shawn Crahan	
2008	Roadrunner United: Documentary	Himself	Shawn Crahan	
2008	Get Thrashed	Himself	Rick Ernst	
2009	Of the (sic): Your Nightmares, Our Dreams	Himself	Shawn Crahan	
2010	Audible Visions of (sic)nesses	Himself	Shawn Crahan	
2010	Tosh.0	Himself	Scott Zabielski	Season 2, Episode 24
2013	Sound City	Himself	Dave Grohl	
2014	Jim Root: The Sound and the Story	Himself	Chuck Brueckmann	
2015	Fear Clinic	Bauer	Robert Green Hall	
2015	Doctor Who - Before the Flood	Fisher King (roar only)	Daniel O'Hara	
2016	Sharknado: The 4th Awakens	Frankie	Anthony C. Ferrante	
2016	QI - Series N Episode 3 "Nosey Noisy"	Himself	Ian Lorimer	
2016	Officer Downe	Headcase Harry	Shawn Crahan	
2017	Nostalgia Critic	Himself	Doug Walker	Episode: The Sorcerer's Apprentice
2017	Day of the Gusano: Live in Mexico	Himself	Shawn Crahan	
2017	"The Therapist"	Himself	Viceland	
2018	Nostalgia Critic	Himself	Doug Walker	Episode: The Most HATED Nutcracker Movie Ever Made
2019	Nostalgia Critic	Himself	Doug Walker	Episode: The Wall
2019	Diamanda Hagan	Azlan		Episode: Roar
2020	Bad Candy	Chilly Billy	Scott B. Hansen and Desiree Connell	
2022	Rucker	Taco Tuesday	Amy Hesketh	

== Bibliography ==
2001–2016	Monthly column for the British publication called "Rock Sound".
2011	Seven Deadly Sins: Settling the Argument Between Born Bad and Damaged Good
2013	A Funny Thing Happened on the Way to Heaven (Or How I Made Peace with the Paranormal and Stigmatized Zealots & Cynics in the Process)
2015	You're Making Me Hate You: A Cantankerous Look at the Common Misconception That Humans Have Any Common Sense Left
2017	America 51: A Probe into the Realities That Are Hiding Inside "The Greatest Country in the World"

Preceded by Anders Colsefni	Slipknot Lead vocalist 1997–present
