= List of Family Matters characters =

Clockwise from bottom-left: Steve (White), Laura (Williams), Myra (Thomas), Eddie (McCrary), Harriette (Payton), and Carl (VelJohnson)

Family Matters is an American sitcom revolving around the Winslow family, a middle-class African-American family living in Chicago. The series ran for nine seasons (eight of which were broadcast on ABC, one on CBS) and is a spin-off of Perfect Strangers. The series features a total of 12 main characters, some of which have been portrayed by multiple actors.

== Casting ==
Jo Marie Payton originally appeared on Perfect Strangers in 1987 in the recurring role of Harriette Winslow, the elevator operator for the Chicago Chronicle. Reginald VelJohnson later made one appearance on Perfect Strangers in the 1989 episode "Crimebusters" as Carl Winslow, policeman and husband of Harriette Winslow. Due to the large popularity of Payton's character with audiences, the character was spun off to its own show, Family Matters. While Payton, VelJohnson, and Telma Hopkins (as Harriette's widowed sister Rachel) were initially the stars of the show, centered around the Winslow family, Jaleel White was introduced as nerdy neighbor, Steve Urkel, during the middle of the first season in the episode "Laura's First Date." Urkel, the lovesick pursuer of Laura Winslow (portrayed by Kellie Shanygne Williams), quickly became a popular breakout character with audiences.

Shortly after the introduction of White as Steve Urkel, Shawn Harrison was cast in the role of Waldo Faldo, initially as the sidekick to a bully portrayed by Larenz Tate who terrorized everyone, and Urkel. When Tate and Harrison were offered the chance to return to the show on a recurring basis, only Harrison took up the offer. As a result, his character was rewritten to be the best friend of Eddie Winslow (portrayed by Darius McCrary). Harrison eventually joined the main cast in the 1992–1993 season. Soon after, Michelle Thomas was cast in the role of Myra Monkhouse, love interest and later girlfriend of Steve Urkel. Thomas was initially only scheduled to appear occasionally but became a permanent member of the main cast in the 1994–1995 season. In the 1996–1997 season, Orlando Brown was added to the cast as Jerry Jamal "3J" Jameson, a troubled youth mentored by Urkel, who later becomes the foster child of the Winslows.

== Main characters ==
The series featured 12 main characters, whose actors appeared during the opening credits.

=== Carl Winslow ===
Carl Otis Winslow
- First appearance: "The Mama Who Came to Dinner" (1989)
- Last appearance: "Lost in Space, Part 2" (1998)
- Portrayed by: Reginald VelJohnson

In-universe information
- Nicknames: Big Guy; BG
- Gender: Male
- Occupation: Police sergeant (1989–1994); Police lieutenant (1994–1997); Police captain (from 1997)
- Family: Winslow
- Spouse: Harriette Winslow
- Children: Eddie Winslow; Laura Winslow; Judy Winslow; Jerry Jamal Jameson (adoptive)
- Relatives: Estelle Winslow (mother)
- Religion: Christianity
- Home: Chicago, Illinois
- Nationality: American

The character Carlton "Carl" Otis Winslow, who originally appeared in the Perfect Strangers episode "Crimebusters" alongside his wife, Harriette, is the son of Estelle Winslow and the late Samuel Winslow, brother-in-law of Rachel Crawford, father of Eddie, Laura, and Judy Winslow, uncle of Richie Crawford and adoptive father of "3J" Jameson. He is a short-tempered, miserly man, but still has a kind and humble nature. In the Season 1 episode "The Mama Who Came to Dinner", Carl mentions having three brothers: Frank (who later appeared in the season 8 episode, "The Brother Who Came to Dinner"), Walter and Calvin; in another episode from that same season, "The Party", he mentions another brother named Darryl. His initials spell "COW" and he is often teased because of this. He holds his position as "King of the Castle" (a self-proclaimed "Big Kahuna") very seriously; however, he is typically quick to admit defeat to Harriette when involved in typical marital disputes.

Carl is constantly annoyed, irritated, and bothered by his pesky neighbor, Steve Urkel, who has great respect for Carl and affectionately calls him "Big Guy." Although Steve is relentlessly annoying and has cost the Winslow family large amounts of time and money with his own clumsiness, he has shown he is more mature than Eddie in accepting responsibility. Carl is often present to back Steve up and help him out in times of distress. Although he continues to be exasperated and irritated by Steve's antics, over the progression of the show, Carl develops a fondness for Steve that surprises even him.

Carl is an officer for the Chicago Police Department. He takes his job seriously and it is often suggested that he is very good at what he does, despite working with several incompetent bosses. In the episode "Good Cop, Bad Cop", it was revealed that Carl's own experience with racial discrimination as a Black person motivated him to become a police officer in order to make a difference in his community, sacrificing his ambition to pursue higher education. He inevitably makes enemies in criminals in the city, but most are incompetent and always fail in their revenge against him. Fitting into the cop stereotype, he has an avid love for doughnuts and other junk food. This plays into the fact that he is overweight and in several stories throughout the series, Carl's physical health plays a role (for example, in the Season 4 episode "Driving Carl Crazy", he is revealed to have high blood pressure, exacerbated by avoiding a healthy diet. Despite the stress of his job, he neither abuses alcohol or tobacco to cope with them; he depends instead on his family for comfort and support. Carl begins the series at the rank of Sergeant, but is promoted to Lieutenant in Season 5's "That's What Friends Are For", and then to Captain in Season 9's "Who's Afraid of the Big Black Book?".

Carl is also the only character to appear in every single episode of the series.

=== Harriette Winslow ===
Harriette Winslow (née Baines)
- First appearance: Payton: "The Mama Who Came to Dinner" (1989); Elder: "Crazy For You" (1998)
- Last appearance: Payton: "Deck the Malls" (1997); Elder: "Lost in Space, Part 2" (1998)
- Portrayed by: Jo Marie Payton (1989–1997); Judyann Elder (1998)

In-universe information
- Nickname: Mama
- Gender: Female
- Occupation: Elevator operator (1989); Director of Security (1989–1993); Service clerk (1994–1997); Head of Sales (from 1997)
- Family: Winslow
- Spouse: Carl Winslow
- Children: Eddie Winslow; Laura Winslow; Judy Winslow; Jerry Jamal Jameson (adoptive)
- Relatives: Estelle Winslow (mother in-law)
- Religion: Christianity
- Home: Chicago, Illinois
- Nationality: American

Harriette Baines Winslow is Carl's wife in the series, Rachel's older sister, the mother of Eddie, Laura and Judy, Richie's aunt, 3J's adoptive mother and the daughter of Jimmy and Darlene Baines. Harriette is a fairly conservative and strong-willed woman. She holds her role in society as a mother and working woman with high regard. Harriette is very reluctant to tell people what they want to hear, as she is very frank and upfront about her feelings. She first appeared in Perfect Strangers as an elevator operator for the Chicago Chronicle, before being laid off and later rehired as Director of Security in the season one episode "Two-Income Family" and then fired from the Chronicle in the Season 5 episode "A Matter of Principle" for refusing to reduce her security staff during a budget crisis. She was later employed by Ferguson's Department Store, beginning with the Season 6 episode "The Looney Bin", initially as a service clerk, then later promoted to Head of Sales in the season nine episode "Out With the Old". Previously, Harriette was enrolled in the police academy to become a police officer, where she met Carl, and graduated. However, Harriette did not join the police force after she and Carl got married, and instead uses her police skills at her security job and on neighborhood watch.

As the voice of reason, she is quite competent at mediating conflicts in her family, often pointing out faults to everyone, but this also makes her very reluctant to take sides. For example, she is usually supportive of her husband, Carl, but during his feuds with another character, she rarely takes his side. Instead, she would criticize both him and the other person, hoping to reconcile them with each other. This especially makes it difficult for Carl to discipline their rebellious son, Eddie, who rarely learns from his mistakes. Conversely, she is especially strict towards her daughter, Laura, despite her being far more responsible, obedient and trustworthy.

Her reasoning, however self-righteous, is motivated by her love for her family and her hopes that all sides can reconcile with each other. Only on one occasion was she forced to side exclusively with Carl which was during his feud with their second neighbor, Nick Neidermeyer, because her first attempt to reprimand both of them failed, with Neidermeyer still unrepentant and mocking Carl's obedience to his wife.

=== Eddie Winslow ===
Played by Darius McCrary.

Edward James Arthur Winslow is a casual NBA, NFL fan and jock. He is the oldest child of Carl and Harriette Winslow and their only son until they adopt 3J in season eight. During the early years of the series, he was a high school student with stereotypical traits of a high school slacker. He had mediocre grades, irresponsible behavior and was always pursuing beautiful girls.

In the first season, he appeared good-intentioned and responsible, despite being academically challenged. In the pilot episode, he approached his father to make an exception and let him stay out past curfew and confessed to his father that his straight-A report card was a classmate's prank once he found out. As the series progressed, Eddie gradually became more rebellious, making many poor choices that landed him in trouble. Eddie frequently had a stormy relationship with his father, especially concerning Carl's strict rules but also because of Eddie's immature attitude and penchant for breaking rules. Being a rebel and hedonist, his viewpoint of adulthood is very childish, believing that all adults are free from rules, authority and punishment. He despises being treated like a kid and demands to be treated like an adult but at the same time, he scarcely acts like an adult and fiercely avoids adult responsibilities as often as possible.

It was shown a few times that Eddie was prone to gambling, getting into trouble but refusing to go to Carl for help, getting him into more trouble than not, such as dealing with a pool hustler in season 2's "Fast Eddie Winslow". When getting into trouble or debt, Eddie would often try to solve the problem himself, refusing to confess to his father at the risk of being punished, which would likely land him into trouble with his father anyway. Once, after damaging the family car in the Season 2 episode, "Busted", he was caught illegally gambling at an underground casino, hoping to win money and pay for repairs without telling his parents. In the season 3 episode, "Jailhouse Blues", after getting caught joyriding in a stolen car with his delinquent cousin, he attempted to sweet talk himself out of punishment, which only got him punished for the remainder of the year. In the season five episode "Money Out the Window", after getting into gambling debt once again, he attempts to sell Carl's rare stamp, hoping to buy it back before being caught by his father. Once more, after getting scammed in season 7 episode "Scammed", he lied to his father to borrow money to pay an illegally overpriced bar tab. However, on a few occasions, he has shown he was willing to go to his father for help, such as when he was sold a stolen stereo system in season 4's "Hot Stuff" and got racially profiled by two white cops (an unapologetic racist senior officer and his obedient rookie partner) when cited for a traffic violation that he did not commit in season 5's "Good Cop, Bad Cop".

Eddie, like his father and sister, is often constantly irritated, annoyed and harassed by their neighbor, Steve Urkel.

During the first two seasons, he was friends with classmate Rodney Beckett. From the third season onwards, Eddie's best friends were Waldo Faldo and Steve Urkel. He also on occasion, would hang out with "Weasel". Initially, his relationship with Steve – who considered Eddie his "best bud" and often affectionately called him "Eddo" – was little more than out of pity (because Steve was an unpopular nerd). Eddie remained loyal to Steve and he eventually accepted him as a true friend.

Eddie has dated a very large number of girls throughout the series, sometimes more than one at the same time, with very few of them reappearing as his girlfriend. Even Steve has remembered the names of many of Eddie's girlfriends but cannot keep track of which one Eddie currently dates. When he met one and attempted to guess her name, Steve foolishly blurted out many names, likely the names of Eddie's past girlfriends, which leads to Eddie chasing after the nerd. When Steve tried to invite Eddie's friends to his birthday party, he was tricked by Laura to call numbers from Eddie's "little black book", resulting in the entire family room flooded with attractive women, much to Eddie's ironic horror. However, Eddie has shown that he is not beyond desiring true love and pursuing an honest and serious relationship. His most enduring, successful, and ultimately final relationship is with Greta McClure. His relationship with Greta developed throughout the series and faced many obstacles, most notably in the forms of Myrtle Urkel and Greta's father Dave McClure (owner of Eddie's employer Mighty Weenie).

Eddie has two main adversaries on the show. The first was Myrtle Urkel, the cousin of Steve Urkel and a rich Southern belle whose infatuation with Eddie mirrored Steve's infatuation to Laura. However, unlike Steve, Myrtle never respected Eddie's personal space and kept pursuing him much to his extreme terror. She waited until season seven (beginning with the episode "She's Back") to try and win his love, but he was dating Greta at the time. Unlike Laura's would-be boyfriends when it came to Steve, Greta was more successful in warding Myrtle off. Undaunted, Myrtle made her last push to win Eddie's heart by getting a makeover but he was still not impressed. She soon relinquished her love for him in season nine's "Don't Make Me Over," and set her sights on other guys. Eddie's second main adversary was his former boss, Dave McClure, who did not approve of Eddie dating his daughter and tried to keep them apart in three episodes (including "My Bodyguard" and "Walking My Baby Back Home" in season seven). As of the series finale, Eddie and Greta are still dating and are living together in an apartment, in spite of Mr. McClure having disowned her.

Eddie has shown to have matured and become more responsible and hardworking throughout the series. Though he started as a mediocre student, he got accepted into college. He worked at a Mighty Weenie restaurant and became its manager. When his academic challenges restarted in college, Eddie switched his focus to become a police officer like his father. Eddie enrolled at the police academy in the season 9 episode "Breaking Up Is Hard to Do," eventually getting hired by the Chicago Police Department as a rookie officer at the end of the series in "Lost in Space (Part 1)".

=== Laura Lee Winslow ===
Played by Kellie Shanygne Williams.

Laura Lee Winslow (nee "Felicia") is the oldest daughter of Harriette and Carl Winslow, the object of Steve Urkel's affections, and an aspiring attorney. In school, Laura was essentially the ideal girl; beautiful, popular and received very good grades. Unlike her brother, who was a slacker and more into sports, Laura was very independent and focused with her education and was even distraught when her straight-A streak was broken by a mere B+. She often tried to do everything to succeed by herself, which was not always the right choice. She tried to start a babysitting business when she was a child, sneaked out of the house to burn herself out studying for a test despite her parents' insistence to rest and worked a graveyard shift to save money to buy a car. She eventually got accepted to Harvard University in season seven's "Twinkle Toes Faldo," but decided to decline the offer because her parents could not afford the tuition, though she told them it was because she could not live so far from home, starts a new plan by completing her undergraduate studies at a local university first before pursuing her law degree.

Laura, along with her father and brother & Aunt is also often bothered by their annoying neighbor, Steve Urkel.

Laura began as quite vain, often in pursuit of popular good-looking boys, being dismissive towards Steve and showing little respect for her academically challenged older brother. She was not always a good judge of character, as a majority of her would-be boyfriends were antagonists in their appearances. She had many boyfriends who would bully Steve and who would cheat on her but would ultimately end with Steve warding them off. Laura generally had little patience for Steve's antics but her seeming dislike of him only seemed to egg him on further. She eventually grew wiser and demonstrated better judgement. She has shown appreciation to Steve when he selflessly helped her and the Winslows out when they needed him. Laura eventually learned to love Steve. They became a couple in the final (ninth) season episode "Crazy for You” and were engaged to be married in the third-to-last episode, "Pop Goes the Question".

=== Judy Winslow ===
Played by Valerie Jones (pilot only), and Jaimee Foxworth (season 1, episode 2 - season 4, episode 19)

Judith "Judy" Winslow is the younger daughter and youngest biological child, of Carl and Harriette Winslow. Her middle name is unknown (Laura's middle name is Lee and Eddie's middle names are James and Arthur). She is nine years old as the series begins and remains in the series until she is thirteen. It is suggested that she enjoys a close relationship with her sister Laura. She attends elementary school, and later attends middle school for sixth grade. Following the fourth-season episode "Mama's Wedding", the character disappears from the series altogether, with no explanation given. Series co-creator and executive producer William Bickley said she was cut due to a "budget consideration". She can be seen in archive footage on season 6 episode “What’s Up Doc?” A major factor in Jo Marie Payton's increasing unhappiness on the series involved her close relationship with Foxworth and the feeling that Judy was the show's "baby" and it was hurtful when she was written out; Payton also made it clear she resented the fact that the rise of the Steve Urkel character resulted in Judy and other key characters losing focus in the series, as his popularity made him the engine of the show's long-term success. Foxworth discussed the damage done to her career and life when she was fired and essentially erased from Family Matters on the VICE TV series "Dark Side of Comedy".

=== Estelle Winslow / Thomas ===
Played by Rosetta LeNoire.

Estelle Winslow is the mother of Carl Winslow and his four brothers, Harriette's mother-in-law and grandmother of Eddie, Laura and Judy Winslow. Estelle is a very wise woman and always very defensive of her grandchildren. Estelle moves into her son's household at the start of the series. She (unlike all of the other Winslows) was a friend of Steve Urkel for the entire series and loved him like a grandson while completely unaware that Steve is bothering his son Carl grandson Eddie and granddaughter. She loved when Steve came to the Winslow house and instead of trying to make him leave, she wanted him to stay. Steve always affectionately called her "Estelle, my Belle," which she loved. Estelle is street-wise and keeps up to date with the latest pop culture and trends, much to the surprise of her family. In later seasons (beginning with season two's "Requiem for an Urkel"), she begins a relationship with Fletcher Thomas, which Carl disapproves of initially before eventually accepting the relationship. The two later got married at the Winslow home in season four's "Mama's Wedding". Estelle would often say her catchphrase "way to go, Carl," usually to Carl when he did something wrong.

=== Steve Urkel ===
Played by Jaleel White.

Steven "Steve" Quincy Urkel is the Winslows' annoying, boisterous, clumsy neighbor. As the quintessential nerd, he has large, thick eyeglasses, "high-water" pants held up by suspenders, a squeaky high-pitched nasal-tone voice and a snorting laugh. He first appeared in the season one episode "Laura's First Date" and was also known for his massive crush on Laura Winslow, whose affections he was constantly attempting to win. He became known for his signature "Urkel Dance", a novelty dance that he frequently performed.

While highly intelligent, he is also quite accident-prone (spawning his catchphrase, "Did I do that?") and socially awkward. As a nerd, he gradually grows to become an inventor, and soon, his ill-conceived inventions form a large bulk of the accidents which he does to the Winslow house, causing Carl to yell at him. He has also created numerous inventions that were otherwise considered impossible, such as a machine which turned him into his suave alter-ego, Stefan Urquelle, as well as alter his personality into other celebrities whose DNA he inexplicably collected, such as the crime-fighting Bruce Lee Urkel.

Steve is generally portrayed as odd and dorky but kindhearted and good-natured character. However, he tends to be socially tone-deaf and other people, especially the Winslows, find him annoying. Steve's saving grace is that he is a genuinely good person who cares about others (often putting their needs and wants ahead of his own) and over time others come to genuinely like him and treat him with more respect, even as he remains a walking sight gag and prone to random disasters. While some of the main characters are more welcoming towards him, it is Carl, Eddie and Laura who are the most tormented by his shenanigans, because they are the ones he most wants to be closest to and be himself around, resulting in extremely little formality and respect. And while he has a kind heart, he often does not care how he affects others with his behavior (in a way, Urkel was a forerunner of the Sheldon Cooper character on The Big Bang Theory, who was also a genius and rarely noticed/cared about the way he affected other people).

While Steve is mostly known for having a strong sense of integrity and general responsibility (succeeding at school, refusal to cheat, obeying the law), his social lifestyle remained largely uncompromising, incapable of accepting "No" for an answer, and undisciplined, completely unfamiliar with consequences for his actions. A likely reason for rarely being punished is that his parents and larger family were unsupportive and cold towards him, often leaving him to fend for himself and seek his family needs elsewhere. His attachment to the Winslow family makes sense in this context. By the end of the series, Steve has made it plain that he considers Carl Winslow to be his "real father" and that he does not care if his actual family is part of his life anymore.

Despite how blessed he is for being tolerated by the Winslows, he quickly became extremely spoiled and coddled around them. Before long, not only does he completely lose any ability to live without the Winslows, but he also cannot live without having control over them. He enters their home and eats their food without any permission, frequently disobeys their orders, stalks their daughter, and admits to using electronic devices to spy on the whole family. This behavior is usually played for laughs by portraying Steve as the "wacky neighbor" whom the Winslow family basically comes to accept because they have no choice.

However, Urkel finds himself more considerate of other people after enduring being stalked by Myra and finding out what it's like being unwillingly pursued, although he would still continue clinging to Laura, both to be with her as well as to escape from Myra. It is only after he lets go of Laura and accepts Myra, after much reluctance, that he no longer clings so much to others and his relationships finally become more stable. In the show's final season, Steve makes adjustments in his behavior and appearance that do not change who he is but are part of his acknowledgment that instead of just being himself, he "could be better." Perhaps not accidentally, Laura begins to genuinely have romantic feelings for him and they end up becoming a couple and getting engaged right before the series ends.

=== Rachel Crawford ===
Played by Telma Hopkins (seasons 1–4; recurring, season 6; guest season 9).

Rachel Baines Crawford was Harriette's attractive and widowed younger sister. She moved in with the Winslows shortly after her husband Robert died. She is the mother of Richard "Richie" Crawford and the daughter of Jimmy Baines, who appeared in the season two episode "Finding the Words" to reconcile with her and Harriette, after he walked out on them when they were little. A budding singer, she is also a writer and an entrepreneur, opening Rachel's Place (a hangout for teenagers, much in the vein of Arnold's from Happy Days) in the season two episode "Rachel's Place," which replaced Leroy's, a similar hamburger joint that Urkel had accidentally burned down while working there. Rachel is seen throughout the first three seasons; & appears infrequently for a number of episodes in the fourth season due towards her getting her own sitcom after a year's absence (due to Telma Hopkins leaving the show full-time to star in the short-lived sitcom Getting By), she made occasional appearances during the sixth and ninth seasons. Rachel considered herself more beautiful than Harriette. Rachel's trademark during the early seasons was her hats. Her final appearance was in the Christmas-themed episode "Deck the Malls" from the ninth season.

=== Richie Crawford ===
Played by Joseph & Julius Wright (credited as Joseph Julius Wright) (season 1); and Bryton McClure (seasons 2–9).

Richard "Richie" Crawford was the only son of Robert and Rachel Crawford; Robert dies before Richie was born, which in part prompts Rachel's move into the Winslow household. There, Carl effectively fills the "father" role left vacant by Robert's death. Richie is almost a year old in the show's first season and was age-advanced to 3-years-old in beginning with the season two premiere "Rachel's Place". He is a typical mischievous child and even idolizes Steve; in fact, due to the nerd's constant visits and unrelenting crush on Laura, Richie calls him "Uncle Steve". In later episodes, Richie becomes the friend to a young orphan named 3J (whom the Winslows eventually adopt). His final appearance in the series was in the Christmas-themed episode "Deck the Malls" from the ninth season. He was often paired with and had a sibling rivalry like relationship with Judy.

=== Jerry Jamal Jameson ===
Played by Orlando Brown (seasons 8–9).

Jerry Jamal Jameson, referred to as 3J, is a young boy whom Carl and Harriette adopted in the season eight episode "3J in the House". He was introduced as Urkel's "Little Brother" (in the season seven episode "My Big Brother," which pays homage to the Big Brothers/Big Sisters of America program) and later becomes friends with Richie. His street-wise, smart-mouthed demeanor is a cover for his loneliness and desire to have a stable, permanent family; his birth mother had given him up for adoption shortly after he was born and frequently moved around. He was living with his aunt (freaky) for a time until he was placed in a children's shelter, when she could no longer afford to keep him. The Winslows, seeing that he needed love, decide to adopt him. It is revealed in the episode "Whose Man is it Anyway?," that his mother is a waitress and Carl took him there (not realising the connection) for lunch and that one day she would like to reunite with him but until then, Carl promises to take care of him and would remain keeping in contact with her.

=== Waldo Geraldo Faldo, Jr. ===
Played by Shawn Harrison (main; seasons 4–7, recurring; seasons 2–3).

For most of the time that Waldo was featured on the show, he was a friend of Eddie Winslow (the son of the show's main characters, Carl and Harriette Winslow) and the Winslows' quintessential nerdy neighbor, Steve Urkel. When he was introduced in the season two episode "Requiem for an Urkel," he started off as Willie Fuffner's friend but though he generally had no ill intent and was not quite the bully that Willie was, he still nonetheless ignorantly followed Willie's lead. The two got arrested for bringing alcohol to a party in "Life of the Party," and Waldo presumably ended their friendship afterwards out of guilt for nearly endangering Urkel. His character was rewritten as a good guy and to serve as a friend of Eddie's. Like Steve Urkel (the show's most famous character), Waldo was an outlandish, almost surrealistic person. While Steve was the resident nerd, Waldo was the resident idiot. Waldo eventually reached a point in his lack of intelligence to where he even manages to annoy Steve. In the season three episode "Food, Lies and Videotape," Waldo was discovered to be an excellent chef. It is later revealed that Waldo did not learn how to walk, until he was 10. He dated Laura's best friend Maxine for many seasons (beginning with the season four episode "Pulling Teeth") until breaking up with her in season eight's "Love Triangle" after he left for culinary school (In real life, Shawn Harrison said his contract expired). He is also mentioned to have a sister named Quesadilla. Waldo says when asked why his sister was given that name that it was because she was born at a Taco Bell and his parents weighed over naming her either Quesadilla or Burrito Grande ("And that's a stupid name!" as he quipped regarding the latter). His extended family includes cousins such as American Gladiator Sabre (who, as a favor to settle a dispute between Carl and Steve, got them to compete against each other on the show), a short-statured but good-natured cousin named Babalabadingdong (whom he'd set Laura up with on a blind date), one of the members of the R&B group Portrait (who'd made Waldo promise to not reveal that they were related when the group was performing at a school dance), his aunt Bababababara-Ann (Babalabadingdong's mother), His aunt Velveeta and her husband, Jalapeño and another uncle whose head is in a jar in a science lab at Harvard University.

Waldo's most famous trait was his dimwittedness and his uncanny ability to misinterpret a simple question, comment or directive. His catchphrases include: "coo" (cool), "no prob, Bob!" and "sup". Waldo has also shown that he has a sense of morality in three key episodes. In season three's "A Test of Friendship," he comes to Steve's defense by calling Eddie out for wanting to cheat on their chemistry test and tells him that he should have known the consequences. In season seven's "Talk's Cheap," Waldo revealed he was the one who called a daytime talk show that Eddie, Steve, Myra, Laura, Myrtle and Stefan appear as guests on in that episode and brought everyone back to their senses with Stefan's help. In "Tips For A Better Life," he refused to let Eddie move into his house after he hurt his feelings by insulting him while he was drunk. Waldo mentions that anyone who drinks and insults friends is no friend of his, though in true Waldo fashion he was most angered that Eddie's drunken slam that Waldo would win the gold medal "at the Stupid Olympics" referred to an event that didn't exist.

Before playing Waldo, Harrison previously appeared in Season 1's "The Party" as a guest at the titular party Eddie was trying to stop, credited as "Guy in Towel".

=== Myra Monkhouse ===
Played by Michelle Thomas (main; seasons 6–9, recurring; season 4–5).

Myra Boutros Boutros Monkhouse was introduced midway through the fourth season in "A Thought in the Dark" as a possible girlfriend for Steve. She was the cousin of Laura's then-boyfriend, Ted Curran, who set up the date to get nerdy Steve out of his way. Myra was originally intended to be a one-time character (as Steve had been envisioned as when he was introduced in season one) but ultimately became a recurring character in the series. Although Ted was dropped from the show after the season four episode "Heart Strings" and ultimately never referred to again, Myra would become a regular character throughout the rest of the series starting in season six.

Myra is an attractive girl who is attracted to nerdy boys and polka music. She has a very perky and persistent personality. In the season five episode "A Matter of Principle," Myra transferred to Vanderbilt High School to be closer to whom she affectionately calls her "Stevie-kins". Steve is also attracted to Myra but he never grew to love her over the course of the show. He only agrees to date her, on the condition that his friendship with Laura remain intact. This frequently causes Myra to feel in competition with Laura for Steve's affections; Laura would often try to correct the misunderstanding but Myra would only become more convinced that Laura was after Steve. However, since Laura does not really show any attraction for Steve, Myra is willing to accept a truce, although the Laura-Myra relationship remains testy and adversarial, even in the most banal, non-Urkel situations.

After Steve decided to go steady with Myra in the season six episode "Paradise Bluff," Myra's character calmed and developed and she began to fit together more comfortably with the rest of the main characters. She became less persistent and less aggressive in clinging onto Steve, and Steve became more comfortable and welcoming with her. She became more friendly towards Laura and formed a trio of sorts with her and Steve (with herself in between, of course). She is also grouped together with Laura and Maxine.

In the ninth season, Steve and Myra grow apart. In "Breaking Up Is Hard To Do" from that season, she hated his makeover (which he did in that season's premiere episode "Out with the Old," in an attempt to become less grating to other people) and demanded him to change back to the nerd she loved so much. When Steve refused, Myra broke up with him right away. However, it only turned out to be a ploy and she only pretended to break up with him in order to get him to renounce his love for Laura and stay with her. That failed and Steve decides to start a real relationship with Laura. However, Myra never fully accepted the idea of their relationship being officially over. From here, Myra's character regressed and devolved to an antagonistic role, competing with Laura for Steve's affections and pursuing Steve relentlessly, similarly to her early appearance. When Steve asks Laura on a date and Laura accepts in "Crazy for You," she grows furious at her loss. Myra pairs up with Stefan Urquelle (Jaleel White) and both set out to win them back. Although both were successful in stopping it in the following episode "Crazier For You," Stefan soon felt guilty of trying to break Steve and Laura up and decides to leave them alone. However, Myra continues to try multiple times, including spying on Steve, until he learned the truth and ordered her to renounce her love for him. She refused and he had Myra arrested by the end of that episode when he exposed her for stalking him with illegal spy gear in her room to the police. At the time of the show's series finale "Lost in Space," Steve and Laura were officially engaged to be married. When Myra learned about their engagement, she was furious and continued to carry the torch for him as he drifted off into outer space. It is unknown what happened to her after that.

The actress who played Myra, Michelle Thomas, fell ill with cancer in August 1997, and died in December 1998. This limited her screentime as Myra in the final seasons of the show.

== Recurring characters ==
- Lt. Murtaugh (played by Barry Jenner; seasons 2–4)

Lieutenant Murtaugh is Carl's unreliable and obnoxious second boss at the Chicago Police Department. He has a crush on an unwilling Rachel and tries to date her in season two's "Skip to My Lieu". Murtaugh is seemingly tolerant of Steve Urkel when they bond over root beer floats about their love lives at the end of that episode, but later takes Steve's money over a poker game in season three's "A Pair of Ladies". In the season 2 episode "Taking Credit", it turns out that "Lieutenant" is legally his real name, his name having previously been "Sergeant" when Carl was actually asking about his given one.

- Capt. Marion Savage (played by Sherman Hemsley; season 6)

Introduced in season six's "Par For the Course," Captain Savage is Carl's loudmouthed third boss who is more obnoxious than Murtaugh. As revealed in "Midterm Crisis," his fiancée Lois works as a stripper, although he is not too happy when Carl tells him about it as he already knew. Savage and Urkel are revealed to be members of the same cheese club.

- Commissioner Geiss (played by Dick O'Neill; seasons 8–9)

Carl's final boss, introduced in season seven's "Chick-a-Boom". Although somewhat gruff, he is more tolerable and shows more patience, respect and faith in Carl than his previous bosses. He promotes Carl to captain in season nine's "Who's Afraid of the Big Black Book?," when his son expresses that Carl deserves the position more.

- Jolene Santiago (played by Bridgid Coulter; season 2)

Eddie's first serious girlfriend, introduced in season two's "Rachel's Place."

- Greta McClure (played by Tammy Townsend; seasons 7–9)

Eddie's second serious and final girlfriend in the series, who first appears in the season six episode "My Bodyguard", and another one of Laura's friends. She has difficulty coping with her ill-tempered, tyrannical and unreasonable father, who does not approve of her relationship with Eddie. She and Myrtle Urkel became enemies immediately upon their first meeting in season seven's "She's Back," and several episodes that follow centered on their battle to win Eddie's love. However, Greta was more successful in warding Myrtle off than Laura's would be boyfriends are with Urkel. Townsend first appeared in the Season 3 episode "The Love God" as one of the girls in Steve's fantasy.

- Alex "Weasel" Parks (played by Shavar Ross; seasons 4–5)

Another friend of Eddie and Waldo from high school, who was also a friend of one of Laura's ex-boyfriends, Ted Curran. "Weasel" was an obnoxious and highly irresponsible jerk, having persuaded Eddie to break curfew and to gamble on football games (in "Money Out the Window") without having enough money to pay the lost bet. His favorite past time is mooning Meter Maids which Carl finds offensive to Law Enforcement Officers.

- Penny Peyser (played by Ebonie Smith; season 1)

Laura's best friend from season one, who like Rodney, has little patience for Urkel's antics. She also had a crush on Eddie.

- Maxine Johnson (played by Cherie Johnson; seasons 2–9)

Laura's best friend and Waldo's girlfriend until Waldo's departure from the series. Although Maxine is the series' longest recurring secondary character, she was never officially part of its main cast. Maxine has been attracted to many handsome boys and dated several boyfriends throughout the course of the series, both seen and unseen. Eventually, she would begin dating Waldo in season five and was surprised to establish a loving and enduring relationship with him. After Waldo's departure from the series, Maxine sets her sights on other boys. Her feelings towards Urkel were much softer than that of Penny's and even Laura's own, mainly due to Maxine's and Steve's coming from neglectful families.

- Ted Curran (played by Patrick J. Dancy; season 4)

Laura's boyfriend and cousin of Myra Monkhouse. Although once antagonistic towards Urkel, and even to Laura, he was one of Laura's few consistent and level-headed boyfriends, even seeking forgiveness for betraying Laura's trust and reconciling with her. While his role in the series was brief, he played a critical role by being the one who introduced his cousin, Myra Monkhouse, to Urkel. While Myra became a permanent character soon afterwards, Ted was dropped after the season four episode "Heart Strings," after he and Laura argued and broke up offscreen.

- Curtis Williams (played by J. Lamont Pope; seasons 7–9)

Another one of Laura's boyfriends and a race car enthusiast. Steve did not like his profession and was against Laura being a passenger in his race car in season seven's "Hot Rods to Heck". Despite his first appearance in that episode depicting him as a more antagonistic character, he and Laura restarted their relationship stronger after the cloned Stefan's stay in Paris following the season eight premiere "Paris Vacation". After Stefan returned in "It Came Upon a Midnight Clear," Curtis and Laura broke up and he started dating Maxine several episodes later in "Love Triangle". Pope previously played Chain in Season 3's "Born to be Mild", as well as a hospital orderly and army cadet in Season 4's "Number One with a Bullet" and "An Officer and a Waldo", respectively.

- Cassie Lynn Nubbles (played by Kim Valentine; season 3)

A stereotypical arrogant and popular blonde student and Laura's rich and spoiled rival who tried to get everything she wanted, including using underhanded tactics to win the student council president election at Vanderbilt High in season three's "Woman of the People".

- Principal Shimata (played by Clyde Kusatsu; seasons 2–5)

The principal of Vanderbilt High, Shimata is friendly towards Steve, but has been annoyed by him before. He and Steve often converse with each other in Japanese. It is inferred that he may have a crush on Ms. Steuben.

- Ms. Irene Steuben (played by Susan Krebs; seasons 2–3)

Steve and Laura's teacher at Vanderbilt High. Although she is a competent teacher to other students, she is very easily annoyed by Urkel and expresses many headaches around the nerd.

- Alfred Looney (played by Tom Poston; season 6)

Mr. Looney is a janitor at Vanderbilt High School, who is introduced in season six's "The Looney Bin". He insists that his last name is supposed to be pronounced "Lou-né" (stating "It's French" each time it comes up). He gets along well with Steve Urkel, who is the only character who actually called him "Lou-né", or simply Alfred. He enjoys singing, dancing, and theater, and has sung and danced a few times with Urkel for fun.

- Nick Neidermeyer (played by Ron Orbach; seasons 7–8)

Harriette's former boss (and later, obnoxious neighbor in "Dream Date") who was an antagonist to both Carl and Harriette. Nick and Steve Urkel never appeared in any scenes together.

- Fletcher Thomas (played by Arnold Johnson; seasons 2–5), Whitman Mayo (season 6), and Edmund Cambridge (season 7)

Estelle "Mother" Winslow's lover, whom she marries in season four (and was introduced in the season two episode "Requiem for an Urkel"). Carl was initially cold to him and disliked his mother dating anyone due to his attachment to his late father, but eventually warmed up to him after learning to fix his behavior. Estelle and Fletcher get married in a wedding ceremony held at the Winslow's backyard in the episode "Mama's Wedding".

- Rodney Beckett (played by Randy Josselyn; seasons 1–2)

Eddie's best friend in high school (introduced in season one's "Straight A's"), who is depicted as a practical joker. Like Penny, he had no patience for Urkel's antics and did not care for him at all. The character last appears in the season two episode "Fast Eddie Winslow".

- K.C. (played by Venus DeMilo Thomas; seasons 4–7)

One of Laura's friends who hangs out with her and Maxine a lot.

- Vonda Mahoney (played by Danielle Nicolet; season 3)

Eddie's short-term girlfriend in season three. After Steve tutored her in a class she was failing at in the episode "The Love God," she gratefully offered herself to him sexually to which Steve declines. Worried that she may sell herself just to have guys date her, Steve teaches Vonda the dangers of making herself easy, and she learns to accept and respect herself more. Though she felt better about it, Eddie wanted to beat up Steve for interfering.

- Gwendolyn (played by Naya Rivera; season 4)

The daughter of the Winslows' next door neighbor, introduced in season four's "Just One Date," who has a crush on Richie.

- Little G (played by Gary LeRoi Gray; seasons 5–6)

Richie's best friend.

- Vice Principal Mallet (played by Fred Willard; seasons 6–7)

The vice principal of Vanderbilt High School. He does not like Steve because of his clumsiness and tried to keep him out of the school's public affairs.

- Zoohair Bhutto (played by Iqbal Theba; season 7–8)

Carl's poker friend.

- Willie Fuffner (played by Larenz Tate; season 2)

Vanderbilt High School's resident bully, to whom Waldo was formerly a friend and henchman. Though he likes bullying Steve, he was mainly antagonistic towards Laura for rejecting him for another boy and forced the guys to the dating sidelines. Steve stood up for her in the season two episode "Requiem for an Urkel," leading to a supervised boxing match between Steve and Willie. Willie and Waldo were also arrested in the episode "Life of the Party" later that season, for spiking Steve's punch with alcohol.

- Coach Westfield (played by Mike Genovese; season 3)

The second coach at Vanderbilt High School.

- Johnny Gill (season 2, season 3 and 8)

Singer Johnny Gill appeared as himself in three episodes (season two's "I Should Have Done Something", season three's "Love and Kisses", and season eight's "Home Again" (to promote the reunion of New Edition)). Steve pays him a rare baseball card to serenade Laura in order to impress her in the latter episode.

- Science Teacher (played by Patrick Cronin; seasons 4–5)

The science teacher at Vanderbilt High School.

- Stefan Urquelle (played by Jaleel White; seasons 5–9)

Stefan Urquelle was Steve's suave and charming alter-ego, who was everything Laura desired in a boyfriend. First appearing in season five's "Dr. Urkel and Mr. Cool," Steve developed this personality as a way to get Laura to love him, but changed back at the end of the episode due to his self-centered personality. Steve soon improved his alter-ego's personality, and originally intended to become Stefan permanently, but found himself juggling between accepting his true self or receiving his long desired love from Laura. Though he learned to accept himself, he would still occasionally and temporarily turn into Stefan when needed. In the season seven episode "Send In the Clone," Steve created an identical clone of himself, whom he had enter into the transformation chamber to become a permanent Stefan. Stefan was developed as a character to serve two goals related to Jaleel White's work on the show: he would both give White the chance to play a role variant that was very different from Steve Urkel, and also allow White to use his normal speaking voice at a point where having to do Steve's voice was starting to cause White serious throat and vocal cord problems (Steve's voice was not an issue for the younger White, but it became one as he went through puberty and his natural voice became much deeper).

- Myrtle Urkel (played by Jaleel White; season 2, 7–9)

Myrtle Urkel was introduced in season two's "Cousin Urkel" as Steve's rich Southern belle cousin whose love for Eddie mirrors that of Steve's for Laura. However, unlike Steve, she never respected Eddie's personal space and kept forcing herself on him much to his extreme horror. Myrtle and Greta McClure became quick adversaries the moment they met in the episode "She's Back" from season seven. In season 9's "Don't Make Me Over", Myrtle gets a makeover with Laura and Maxine's help. However upon realizing that Eddie loves Greta, she relinquishes her love for him and decides to set her sights on other men. When Eddie tries to get her to stay regardless as his life would be boring without her mixing it up by reaffirming her love for him, Myrtle refuses and leaves. Like Stefan Urquelle, Myrtle was conceived as a way to give Jaleel White material to play where he wouldn't have to do the standard Steve Urkel voice. Myrtle also allowed the show to play up lovestruck/comedic stalker aspects that became a non-factor in the show when Steve began dating Myra Monkhouse and became (somewhat) more normal.

=== Notable guest stars ===
- Mason Adams
- Thom Adcox-Hernandez
- All-4-One
- Essence Atkins
- James Avery
- Robert Axelrod
- Shaun Baker
- Garcelle Beauvais
- Lamont Bentley
- Earl Billings
- Earl Boen
- Johnny Brown
- Ron Canada
- T. K. Carter
- Ellen Albertini Dow
- Christopher B. Duncan
- Jason David Frank
- Missy Elliott
- Ken Foree
- Vivica A. Fox
- Johnny Gill
- Ron Glass
- Randee Heller
- Robert Hooks
- Amy Hunter
- Terrence Howard
- Immature
- Stoney Jackson
- Freddie Jackson
- Barry Jenner
- Larry Johnson
- Walter Emanuel Jones
- Shanice
- Christel Khalil
- Bill Kirchenbauer
- Richard Kline
- Dave Koz
- Ted Lange
- Emmanuel Lewis
- Elise Neal
- Sanaa Lathan
- Aaron Lohr
- Mark Linn-Baker
- Ziggy Marley
- Pat Morita
- New Edition
- LaWanda Page
- Holmes Osborne
- Ken Page
- Stuart Pankin
- Portrait
- Kyla Pratt
- Freddie Prinze Jr.
- Greg Proops
- Kelly Perine
- Tanika Ray
- Charles Nelson Reilly
- Jennifer Rhodes
- J. August Richards
- Jack Riley
- Bumper Robinson
- Debra Jo Rupp
- David Ruprecht
- Shai
- Sam Sarpong
- Marley Shelton
- Bubba Smith
- Kristoff St. John
- Mindy Sterling
- Tracie Spencer
- Donna Summer
- Fred Willard
- The Bushwhackers
- Ron Taylor
- Rachel True
- Trina McGee-Davis
- Valarie Rae Miller
- Terri J. Vaughn
- Lark Voorhies
- Melanie Wilson
- Paul Winfield
- Stoney Jackson
- Kimberly Russell
