= Family Matters season 3 =

Family Matters
- Season 3
- Starring: Reginald VelJohnson; Jo Marie Payton; Rosetta LeNoire; Darius McCrary; Kellie Shanygne Williams; Jaimee Foxworth; Bryton McClure; Jaleel White; Telma Hopkins
- No. of episodes: 25

Release
- Original network: ABC
- Original release: September 20, 1991 – May 8, 1992

Season chronology
- ← Previous; Season 2 Next → Season 4

The third season of Family Matters, an American family sitcom created by William Bickley and Michael Warren, premiered on ABC in the U.S. on September 20, 1991, and concluded on May 8, 1992. The season produced by Bickley-Warren Productions, Miller-Boyett Productions, and Lorimar Television, with David W. Duclon as the executive producer. It consists of 25 episodes, most of which were directed by Richard Correll and John Tracy.

== Premise ==
Steve Urkel is still the annoying neighbor to the Winslow family, getting into situations such as bringing a lab chimpanzee to their home, suing Carl for destroying his priceless stick bug, creating a robot that chases after Laura, and joining the church choir despite being tone-deaf.

== Main cast ==
- Reginald VelJohnson as Carl Winslow
- Jo Marie Payton as Harriette Winslow
- Rosetta LeNoire as Estelle Winslow
- Darius McCrary as Eddie Winslow
- Kellie Shanygne Williams as Laura Winslow
- Jaimee Foxworth as Judy Winslow
- Bryton McClure as Richie Crawford
- Jaleel White as Steve Urkel
- Telma Hopkins as Rachel Crawford

== Episodes ==
No. overall	No. in season	Title	Directed by	Written by	Original release date	Prod. code	U.S. viewers (millions)
48	1	"Boom!"	Richard Correll	David W. Duclon	September 20, 1991	446902	22.7
Steve makes friends with an orangutan, who is doomed to a life of scientific experiments. Meanwhile, Carl and Lt. Murtaugh try to defuse a bomb hidden in a treadmill, booby-trapped by a revenge-seeker named Nitro Newton (a.k.a. "The Boston Bomber"). Guest stars: Barry Jenner as Lt. Lieu Murtaugh, Julie Uribe as Jaworski
49	2	"Brain over Brawn"	Richard Correll	Fred Fox, Jr.	September 27, 1991	446903	19.4
It's a battle of brains vs. brawn, as Steve and a braggart classmate vie for the affections of Laura in a rope-climbing contest. Laura suggests that Steve uses his brains to win the competition, leading him to invent a jet-pack to do so. Meanwhile, Carl and Eddie try to fix a leak in their roof, against Harriette's advice to call a professional. Though they succeed, Carl ends up falling off the roof and breaks both his arm and leg. It isn't long until Harriette gives him, her usual "I told you so". The episode ends with Steve's jet-pack sending him up through the Winslows' roof and out of Chicago. The second episode of Step by Step, "The Dance", begins with him landing on the Lamberts' picnic table as a result. In its original broadcast, there was a gag with Steve landing in Port Washington leading into his appearance on Step by Step, but it's since been removed in syndication. Guest stars: David Baur as Alex Phillips, David Hayward as Coach Redding, Cherie Johnson as Maxine Johnson
50	3	"The Show Must Go On"	John Tracy	Gary M. Goodrich	October 4, 1991	446905	21.0
With the original actor to portray Romeo (Bumper Robinson) in the hospital with appendicitis, Steve fills in to perform with Laura (who plays Juliet) in the school play. As one might guess, it ends up a disaster and Miss Steuben reprimands him. Meanwhile, Carl gets a beeper from Lt. Murtaugh, but as it turns out, he ends up doing meager tasks for him. Carl soon has had enough of Murtaugh's meager tasks and destroys the beeper. Guest stars: Barry Jenner as Lt. Lieu Murtaugh, Susan Krebs as Ms. Steuben, Cherie Johnson as Maxine Johnson, Bumper Robinson as Daniel Wallace, Bethany McKinney as Girl at Audition
51	4	"Words Hurt"	John Tracy	David W. Duclon & Fred Fox, Jr.	October 11, 1991	446904	21.0
Harriette and Rachel hire a hypnotist (Earl Boen) to determine why a sleepwalking Steve has been acting out his hostilities on Carl. They learn that, during one of his visits, Steve caused an accident that ruined a model ship Carl had worked four and a half months on. Carl angrily told Steve to get lost, then (not knowing Steve could overhear him) told Laura he wished he'd go away permanently. Carl tries defending his actions, but Harriette and Rachel — in an effort to tell him that words hurt — decide to give him the silent treatment until he apologizes. When Carl invites Steve over so he can apologize to him in person, the latter hooks him up to a lie detector that shocks him whenever he lies. Guest star: Earl Boen as Dr. Goodrich
52	5	"Daddy's Little Girl"	Richard Correll	Sara V. Finney & Vida Spears	October 18, 1991	446901	21.0
When Carl's new rookie partner, Mike Forbes (Perry Moore), pays a visit to their home, Laura immediately develops a massive crush. When Mike gets invited to a diner, she attempts to dress and act older to look "sexy" and more adult, but does not realize her clothing and actions make her look silly. When Carl accidentally hurts her feeling by laughing at her fancy appearance, her feelings are deeply hurt and she feels ashamed in front of the young officer. Soon after, Harriette calls Carl out for embarrassing Laura and tells him to apologize. Carl and Laura finally make up when he explains he never meant anything bad, but as she is his beloved daughter, he can't think of her as anything else but "his little girl" and tells her that Mike is engaged. Meanwhile, Steve lands close to high tide in his family trip to Hawaii, and has a "pleasant" time escaping from a certain Hawaiian woman. Guest stars: Cherie Johnson as Maxine Johnson, Perry Moore as Officer Mike Doyle
53	6	"Citizens' Court"	John Tracy	Regina Stewart	October 25, 1991	446906	22.6
Carl accidentally kills Steve's prized Peruvian stick bug, worth about $500 and Steve grieves over the loss of his buggy friend. Carl reasons that "it was just a stupid bug" and refuses to apologize or at least compensate for what he had done; Steve is resolved to see if a small claims court judge agrees, taking his case to Citizen's Court (a parody of The People's Court). Rachel, Judy, and Richie watch from home where they fight over whether Carl will go to jail. There, the two bring out several "proofs" and "testimonies," some of which even fake, but before the judge (Mason Adams) can decide, Steve's speech finally makes Carl realize that it doesn't matter if it was "just a stupid bug," because it was of much greater importance to Steve. The two walk out from the court, not interested in and never finding out the judge's decision. Guest star: Mason Adams as The Judge
54	7	"Robo-Nerd"	Richard Correll	Gary Menteer	November 1, 1991	446910	23.1
Steve creates Urkelbot (Michael Chambers) to win a computer for Laura in robotics contest, which soon develops a mind of its own and sets a trap to snare Laura for itself, but Steve manages to shut it down just in time. Meanwhile, Carl tries to slow down Estelle and Fletcher's relationship to no avail. When Harriette and Rachel calls Carl out for hurting his mother, he won't tell them why he doesn't approve of her relationship with Fletcher. Guest star: Michael "Shrimp" Chambers as Urkelbot
55	8	"Making the Team"	Richard Correll	David W. Duclon & Gary Menteer	November 8, 1991	446909	25.4
Steve is doing his best to get onto the Vanderbilt High School basketball team, but neither Eddie nor the basketball coach believe he can play, and Steve is made equipment manager instead. Meanwhile, Laura, who just got into the cheerleading team, wants to show some new cheers to the bossy team captain, Cassie Lynn Nubbles (Kim Valentine), who snobbishly refuses to listen to Laura since she is a freshman. For the first time, Laura feels ashamed and feels like an outcast, and decides to ask Steve for advice. In the end, both Laura and Steve end up proving themselves. Laura does her new cheers at the next basketball game without permission from Cassie Lynn, who is demoted as team captain and replaced by Laura. At the same game, Steve is allowed to join the team when too many of Vanderbilt's players are injured, proving to be an excellent basketball player and making the game-winning shot. Guest stars: Kim Valentine as Cassie Lynn, Mike Genovese as Coach Westfield, Bennie Lee McGowan as Mrs. Gherkin, Janine Jordae as Beth
56	9	"Born to Be Mild"	John Tracy	Jim Geoghan	November 15, 1991	446911	24.4
A street gang, known as "The Dragons," comes into Rachel's Place and try to stir up trouble, but luckily, Carl comes by just in time to stop it. Later in the evening, the Winslows receive a police call that The Dragons trashed Rachel's Place, and when the family arrives to assess any damages, they learn that Eddie was brutally beaten up by the gang as he was getting back from a date. Carl is furious and wants revenge for what they did to Rachel's Place and to Eddie. However, Steve warns him not to do anything stupid by committing police brutality or he risks losing his badge. Therefore, Steve voluntarily offers to go into the lair of "The Dragons" under a disguise of a prospect thug wanting to join them, wired. He keeps them busy long enough to make them confess their crimes-- thanks to a loudmouth member-- and the leader is suspicious. Carl and Lieutenant Murtaugh barge in at the last moment to arrest them and save Steve. Guest stars: Barry Jenner as Lt. Lieu Murtaugh, Jaime Cardriche as Osgood, J. Lamont Pope as Chain
57	10	"The Love God"	John Tracy	Stephen Langford	November 22, 1991	446912	23.9
Eddie wants to date an "easy" girl, named Vonda (Danielle Nicolet) but can't unless Steve helps tutor her. Though he succeeds, Steve is concerned for her well-being that she may be selling herself short, decides to counsel her on her ways before their first date. He teaches her that she doesn't have to be "easy" to be popular, because her nice and friendly personality will make her popular by default, much to Eddie's chagrin. Rachel meets a lovely man, who is a complete stranger to her. Meanwhile, Lt. Murtaugh is enjoying a few laughs when Carl must go out in drag as part of an undercover operation. It turns out well, though as Carl manages to catch a wanted man, Murtaugh is ordered to go out in drag for another undercover operation and Carl enjoys a few laughs as well. Guest stars: Barry Jenner as Lt. Lieu Murtaugh, Danielle Nicolet as Vonda Mahoney, Lynn Swann as Greg Johnston, Tammy Townsend as Jenny
58	11	"Old and Alone"	Richard Correll	Stephen Langford	November 29, 1991	446908	19.0
Laura tells Steve he's banished from her life after he warns her about her new boyfriend's ulterior motives. In turn, Harriette tells Laura that her attitude may result in her growing "old and alone". Sure enough, she has a dream set 70 years in the future, where she has become an elderly spinster who is "old and alone". Guest stars: Garcelle Beauvais as Lulu, Bumper Robinson as Daniel Wallace
59	12	"A Pair of Ladies"	John Tracy	Fred Fox, Jr.	December 6, 1991	446913	22.1
With Rachel's Place understaffed, Rachel enlists Harriette's help. However, the two soon get into a huge argument after well-meaning Harriette is all too eager to offer suggestions. Rachel is finally fed up when Harriette fires the cook Ramon due to her feud with him. So, Rachel ultimately fires Harriette, but rehires her when a large group comes in for dinner. Meanwhile, Steve, betting the money he had saved to buy an accordion, joins in Carl's poker night, but gets cleaned out by the hustling Lt. Murtaugh. Carl gives Steve some of his own money to make up for what Steve lost, but Steve decides to bet it once more, challenging Murtaugh to a rematch. Soon, Steve gets his revenge on him when he beats Murtaugh with a four of a kind. After, Carl and Steve agree to one last bet: whoever takes the high card from the deck wins. If Steve won, he would get to come over anytime he wanted, but if Carl won, he would have to stay away for six months. Steve takes a card, but laments as the card was a 3. Carl takes a card, the audience being shown it was a jack. However, he pretends as if there was a deuce and tells Steve that he won. Guest stars: Barry Jenner as Lt. Lieu Murtaugh, Keone Young as Fred Yamano, Bob Delegall as George Randolph, Daniel Faraldo as Ramon, Malaika as Lisa, Thom Curley as The Coach
60	13	"Choir Trouble"	James O'Keefe	Mary M. Schwarze	December 20, 1991	446907	20.7
In her attempts to whip the church choir into shape for the upcoming Gospel Sunday, new choir director Rachel kicks new church member Steve out of the choir because he is tone-deaf. Soon, everyone else leaves the choir after being fed up with her micromanagement. Estelle sets Rachel straight by advising her that God isn't interested in the quality of the voice, but that the words come from the heart. Guest stars: Earl Billings as Man, Shana Mangatal as Becky, Ron Taylor as Pastor Peeble
61	14	"A Test of Friendship"	Richard Correll	Regina Stewart	January 10, 1992	446915	23.9
Steve faces expulsion from school when he colludes with Eddie (who didn't study) to cheat on a chemistry test against Waldo's admonition in the latter. Although feeling bad about it, Eddie refuses to confess until Laura gives him an ultimatum: do the right thing by confessing to save Steve from expulsion or she'll tell on Eddie to everyone (including their parents) about him cheating on the test and let him deal with the consequences. Meanwhile, Carl becomes the laughingstock of the precinct (thanks largely to Lt. Murtaugh) when revenge-seeking burglars use sleeping gas to put Carl to sleep, then rob the Winslows blind. However, their second attempt to rob the Winslows again is foiled when Estelle, Harriette and Rachel come home in time to nab the burglars by hitting them in the head with a snow shovel and chases them inside the house. In the end, the Winslows get their furniture back, Eddie is grounded, he and Steve must retake the test before their suspension is lifted and the burglars are back in jail. Carl is later chased by Harriette and Rachel for his lack of appreciation for them in saving his job. Guest stars: Patrick Cronin as Mr. Howard, Howard George as Langweaver, Barry Jenner as Lt. Lieu Murtaugh, Gary McGurk as Ned, Gregory White as Al
62	15	"Jailhouse Blues"	Gary Menteer	Sara V. Finney & Vida Spears	January 24, 1992	446914	23.1
Harriette's troublesome second cousin from Detroit, Clarence (Shaun Baker), is sent to the Winslows to live. Clarence - aka "Easy-C" - quickly proves to be a bad influence on Eddie and gets him, an unwilling Steve, and a car full of pretty girls (Vivica A. Fox and Mari Morrow) in serious trouble for grand theft auto. After the owner of the stolen car is convinced to drop the charges, Steve is returned home to his upset parents, a remorseless Clarence is sent back to Detroit to face his family's wrath, and Eddie is punished by doing community service for the remainder of the year after failing to feign remorse. Carl later comforts Harriette about Clarence and how Eddie will make mistakes. Guest stars: Shaun Baker as Clarence, Vivica A. Fox as Halawna, Barry Jenner as Lt. Lieu Murtaugh, Mari Morrow as Oneisha
63	16	"Brown Bombshell"	John Tracy	Sara V. Finney & Vida Spears	January 31, 1992	446918	23.0
Estelle is determined to share the stories of her late fighter-pilot husband and World War II's Tuskegee Airmen to an uninterested Winslow clan: especially Eddie and the children. Harriette lambastes Eddie for his behavior and reminds him that he needs to set a better example than the one he showed. Eventually, she is invited to share her stories with Eddie's American History class to which they are very interested and even he admits he's proud of his grandfather. Meanwhile, Steve's prison pen pal (LaWanda Page) is released, yet she believes Carl is Steve and makes moves on Carl. It's up to both of them to get his pen pal out of the house before Harriette finds out. Guest stars: Essence Atkins as Becky, Nicholas Hormann as Mr. Walbrook, LaWanda Page as Elmerita Puckerwood
64	17	"Food, Lies and Videotape"	John Tracy	Stephen Langford	February 7, 1992	446919	22.9
Steve enrolls in a home economics course (just because Laura is in the same class). He soon learns that he's simply not cut out to be a cook, but is actually fine with it. Waldo discovers he might just have a hidden culinary talent and hones in on it. Laura learns how to take time to prepare her meals properly and not rush through them. Whereas, Cassie Lynn refuses to accept that she can't rely on her good looks all the time and need to do something with herself. Meanwhile, Richie and Judy film Eddie kissing his girlfriend Vonda, which chases her away. While trying to open the camera, Richie drops it. Judy tells him he's on his own with this and must confess to Carl. Guest stars: Susan Krebs as Ms. Steuben, Kim Valentine as Cassie Lynn, Danielle Nicolet as Vonda Mahoney
65	18	"My Broken-Hearted Valentine"	Richard Correll	Gary Menteer	February 14, 1992	446916	21.2
Laura becomes further annoyed and angry with Steve, accusing him of once again interfering her romance with Daniel Wallace (Bumper Robinson). Later, she becomes upset with Maxine when she relates her negative experience with Daniel, thinking it to be little more than jealousy. It turns out that the advice from Steve and Maxine is best heeded, especially when Daniel attempts to coerce Laura in her room in order to have sex with her on Valentine's Day. When he tries to pressure her in the same way Maxine said he tried to with her, Laura realizes that her friends were right all along, breaks up with Daniel and banishes him from her life forever, and kicks him out via her window. After she tells Harriette about it, Laura is reprimanded for not listening to her friends and is told to apologize to them at once. Guest stars: Cherie Johnson as Maxine Johnson, Bumper Robinson as Daniel Wallace
66	19	"Woman of the People"	Richard Correll	David W. Duclon & Gary Menteer	February 21, 1992	446920	20.2
Laura is engaged in a heated campaign for class president with snobbish Cassie Lynn (Kim Valentine). However, things grow ugly when she takes some incriminating photos of Laura seeming to embrace Steve (he actually caught her when she fell and was using his weight as a brace) in order to win by cheating. Fortunately, Steve decides to turn Cassie Lynn's plan against her and have Eddie take photos of them kissing. When she tries to point out that he kissed her, Steve reminds Cassie Lynn that he knows how the rumors work having earlier caught her in the act in threatening Laura with exposure of the photos in order to make her withdraw from the election. So Steve intends to return the favor to Cassie Lynn by letting Eddie publish the pictures of them kissing to the school newspaper, allowing the students to think otherwise and ruin her reputation if she doesn't listen at once. He is able to convince her that they can do the election fairly by letting the other students vote and decide for themselves. Cassie Lynn reluctantly agrees to Steve's terms and Laura wins by a landslide. Meanwhile, Carl refuses to participate in a neighborhood watch squad and is later reprimanded for his selfishness. Guest stars: Cal Gibson as Al, Loretta Jean as Gloria, Clyde Kusatsu as Principal Edgar Shimata, Robert Noble as Bernie, Marley Shelton as Becky Sue, Kim Valentine as Cassie Lynn
67	20	"Love and Kisses"	John Tracy	Jim Geoghan	February 28, 1992	446917	21.8
When Laura and Maxine are unable to get tickets to his concert, Steve invites R&B singer Johnny Gill to serenade Laura (in exchange for one of Steve's prized 1952 Topps Mickey Mantle cards), in hopes that she will decide to go out with him. However, at the last second, he decides it's better to let her make her own decision whether she wants to go out with him or not. Meanwhile, Carl and Harriette take a second honeymoon to a resort but are quickly left out in the cold. Guest stars: Cherie Johnson as Maxine Johnson, Thom Sharp as Bob, Johnny Gill as Himself, Jesse Stock as Kid with Snowball
68	21	"Stop! In the Name of Love"	John Tracy	David W. Duclon & Gary Menteer	March 13, 1992	446922	19.7
This time, it's Waldo who has the crush on Laura, particularly when she tries to encourage him after a string of bad luck with dates. Carl and Murtaugh argue of Estelle's driving when Estelle destroys Lt. Murtaugh's new car. Their fighting escalates with a pie fight, with Steve taking the hit. Soon the nerd is fed up and decides to throw a pie at both Carl and Murtaugh. However, an unsuspecting Laura ends up being the recipient of the pie, causing her to chase Steve around. Guest star: Barry Jenner as Lt. Lieu Murtaugh
69	22	"The Urkel Who Came to Dinner"	John Tracy	Regina Stewart	April 3, 1992	446921	23.0
When his parents go out of town unannounced, Steve is invited to stay with the Winslows. However, he unwittingly manages to create havoc: he accidentally vacuums and swallows a fish Carl was looking after for Lt. Murtaugh; he encourages Richie to fight a preschool bully, and he drives away Laura's study date (Mark) when he suspects he's got less than admirable motives. When the family confronts him about it, Estelle and Richie end up mediating the fight. Richie reveals that Steve didn't intend for him to fight the bully, but rather stand up to him. Rachel soon realizes she was wrong and apologizes to Steve for her quick judgment. Estelle mentions to Laura that she should have been grateful to Steve in chasing Mark away. When asked why, Estelle reveals that she and Fletcher had caught him at Lovers Lane with a certain red haired classmate he claimed to have broken up with (when in fact he was dating her on the sly). Laura recognizes the girl from her class and is humiliated when she realizes that Mark had not only lied to her, but is also a two-timer. Guest stars: Barry Jenner as Lt. Lieu Murtaugh, Rugg Williams as Laura's Study Partner
70	23	"Robo-Nerd II"	Richard Correll	Gary Menteer	April 24, 1992	446923	19.8
Steve revamps his Urkelbot into a crime-fighting bot, encouraging Carl to use the technology to solve a rash of convenience store burglaries. Meanwhile, the Winslow women get a nasty surprise when the new shampoo that they ordered causes them to go bald. After buying wigs, the women ask Steve if they can use Urkelbot to trace the shampoo back to the con-artists and get them arrested for their fraud. They soon discover that Urkelbot has no interest in police work and wants to be a dancer instead. Guest stars: Michael "Shrimp" Chambers as Urkelbot, Barry Jenner as Lt. Lieu Murtaugh, Matt Landers as Robber, Ron Smith as Laurabot, Annie Gagen as Customer
71	24	"Dudes"	Richard Correll	Fred Fox, Jr. & Jim Geoghan	May 1, 1992	446924	17.3
Despite Laura's admonition that the show is sexist, Steve, Eddie and Waldo are contestants on the local teen dating show Dudes. Steve uses the show to reaffirm his love for Laura, leading her to reprimand him for his behavior. Meanwhile, Carl tries to find out what his family is planning for his birthday. Guest stars: Derek McGrath as Pat, Mari Morrow as Oneisha, Lisa Marie Russell as Nicole, Judette Warren as Tanya
72	25	"Farewell, My Laura"	Richard Correll	David W. Duclon & Gary Menteer	May 8, 1992	446925	17.6
Laura and Rachel find a novel that Steve wrote for a contest, portraying himself as gumshoe crime fighter Johnny Danger. Danger is paid to protect supper club owner Rachel, who is targeted by an assassin. When Rachel is killed, the "Wigglesworths," Murtaugh, and Waldo are all suspects. Who murdered Rachel, and can he find out fast? Guest stars: Barry Jenner as Lt. Lieu Murtaugh, Cherie Johnson as Maxine Johnson
