= Family Matters season 4 =

Family Matters
- Season 4
- Starring: Reginald VelJohnson; Jo Marie Payton; Rosetta LeNoire; Darius McCrary; Kellie Shanygne Williams; Jaimee Foxworth; Bryton McClure; Shawn Harrison; Jaleel White; Telma Hopkins
- No. of episodes: 24

Release
- Original network: ABC
- Original release: September 18, 1992 – May 14, 1993

Season chronology
- ← Previous; Season 3

The fourth season of Family Matters, an American family sitcom created by William Bickley and Michael Warren, premiered on ABC in the U.S. on September 18, 1992, and concluded on May 14, 1993. Shawn Harrison, who played Waldo Faldo, became part of the main cast this season. The character Myra Monkhouse, played by Michelle Thomas, debuted. This was the last season as part of the main cast for Jaimee Foxworth, who played Judy Winslow, and for Telma Hopkins, who played Rachel Crawford. John Tracy and Gary Menteer directed most of the episodes.

== Synopsis ==
Steve Urkel continues to be the well-intentioned, annoying nerd that still lives next door to the Winslow clan. Urkel continues to get himself into predicaments causing the Winslow's grief such as taking a feud with Carl to American Gladiators or causing him stress leading to health changes. His unrequited love for Laura is as strong as ever, but gets into his first serious relationship with Myra Monkhouse.

== Cast ==
=== Main cast ===
- Reginald VelJohnson as Carl Winslow
- Jo Marie Payton as Harriette Winslow
- Rosetta LeNoire as Estelle Winslow
- Darius McCrary as Eddie Winslow
- Kellie Shanygne Williams as Laura Winslow
- Jaimee Foxworth as Judy Winslow
- Bryton McClure as Richie Crawford
- Shawn Harrison as Waldo Faldo
- Jaleel White as Steve Urkel
- Telma Hopkins as Rachel Crawford

=== Recurring cast ===
- Cherie Johnson as Maxine Johnson
- Michelle Thomas as Myra Monkhouse
- Shavar Ross as Alex "Weasel" Park
- Patrick J. Dancy as Ted Curran

=== Guest stars ===
- Mike Adamle as himself
- Larry Csonka as himself
- Lynn "Red" Williams as Sabre
- Galen Tomlinson as Turbo

== Episodes ==
No. overall	No. in season	Title	Directed by	Written by	Original release date	Prod. code	U.S. viewers (millions)
73	1	"Surely You Joust"	John Tracy	Fred Fox, Jr. & Jim Geoghan	September 18, 1992	447801	19.7
Carl and Steve get into a feud over Steve wrecking the Winslow's satellite. Carl orders Steve to leave and never come back. Steve refuses, claiming Carl has no right to tell him what to do. When the family tries to break up their fighting, Waldo comes up with a great idea. He points out that Carl and Steve should be able to behave like gentlemen and apologize. Since they won't, he calls his cousin American Gladiator Sabre and arranges for them to compete on American Gladiators. During the final round, Carl ("Bonecrusher") and Steve ("Hurricane") realize where their feud has gotten them and finally talk to each other. Steve admits he was wrong in what he said earlier and apologizes to Carl for not respecting his house rules. In turn, Carl apologizes for wrongly banning Steve and decides to make an arrangement to come over to his house as long as his house rules are respected. Steve agrees to respect Carl's house rules more. Guest stars: Mike Adamle as Himself. Larry Csonka as Himself, Lynn "Red" Williams as Sabre, Galen Tomlinson as Turbo, Larry Thompson as The Referee, Salina Bartunek as Elektra, Shelley Beattie as Siren
74	2	"Dance to the Music"	John Tracy	Joseph Cvar & Gary Menteer	October 2, 1992	447804	17.9
Laura, a nominee for homecoming queen, sets her sights on a popular jock named Ted and has refused any other dates. Steve wants to make Laura happy, helps Ted break the ice with her and skips asking her out (this time). Meanwhile, Carl becomes jealous of Harriette's piano teacher (Julius Carry) and is set straight for his behavior. At the homecoming dance, Laura is enjoying herself with Ted, while Waldo is Waldo in inviting two girls to the dance and making Eddie very uncomfortable when he tries to explain himself. Although depressed by this, Steve also knows that her happiness is more important to him and that gives him comfort. Laura wins the Homecoming Queen title and asks Steve to share the dance with her as a token of appreciation for his kindness. Guest stars: Julius Carry as Oscar, Mike Genovese as Coach Westfield, Pamela Holt as Homecoming Princess
75	3	"Driving Carl Crazy"	John Tracy	Stephen Langford	October 9, 1992	447803	20.4
Carl is trying to deal with high blood pressure, but instead of listening to his doctor, he takes waiting room advice ("3–2–1, 1–2–3, what the heck is bothering me?"). It's put to the test when Steve asks him to give him some driving lessons to impress Laura. After Carl suffers a mild health scare, Harriette convinces him to listen to his doctor.
76	4	"Rumor Has It..."	Gary Menteer	Gary M. Goodrich	October 16, 1992	447805	20.2
Rumor has it that Ted "scored" with Laura on their date. Steve is stuffed in his locker trying to get Ted to take it back. Laura gets him out but when he tries to warn Laura about the fast-spreading rumor around school, Laura doesn't believe him and tells the nerd never to speak to her again, but then Maxine tells her she heard the very same rumors about her and Ted. Laura then enlists Steve and Eddie to get the truth out into the open. A furious Eddie threatens to hurt Ted if he doesn't admit the truth. Ted confesses but then pins the blame on his friend, Weasel (Shavar Ross), for starting the rumors and Laura ends her relationship with him. Guest stars: Keri Johnson as Jim, Stacy Arnell as Stephanie
77	5	"Number One With a Bullet"	Gary Menteer	Fred Fox, Jr.	October 23, 1992	447806	17.7
Steve passes out on the Winslows' floor. Even though they thought he was faking, Carl realized he was in distress and called an ambulance. When they find out he has appendicitis, Carl thinks he's in store for a few nerd-free days until he is shot in the butt while trying to foil a robbery and winds up sharing the same hospital room as Steve. However, the nerd may prove a helping hand when one of the robbers wants revenge on Carl for having his brother captured. This episode marks the final appearance of Barry Jenner as Lt. Murtaugh. Guest stars: Barry Jenner as Lt. Lieu Murtaugh, Christopher Darga as Jenkins, Michael Griswold as Dr. Skiles, Annie Gagen as Charlene, J. Lamont Pope as Orderly
78	6	"Whose Kid Is It Anyway?"	John Tracy	Sara V. Finney & Vida Spears	October 30, 1992	447807	19.2
Despite his original promise to take Richie trick-or-treating, Eddie decides to go out on his date with a girl named Angela whose friend, Darryl, is hosting a Halloween party and asks Waldo to cover for him. He accidentally brings home another child named Tommy Wong and when Steve and Laura find out, they confront Waldo for the mistake. He quickly calls Darryl's house asking him to send a message to Eddie to come back home at once because they have a problem. Once Eddie arrives, Steve and Laura confront him for breaking his promise to Richie and leaving him with Waldo. Eddie then confronts Waldo for the mistake as Carl, Harriette and Rachel come home. Laura comes up with a quick plan to put the mask back on Tommy and pass him off as Richie so no one gets suspicious. When Carl, Harriette and Rachel are safely upstairs, they can search for Richie. Meanwhile, Rachel dreads going to the annual Police Halloween party with Carl because of Lt. Murtaugh and his latest attempt to win her over by dressing up as a sofa. When she, Carl and Harriette come home, things seem to be normal. That is until Tommy's mother, Mrs. Wong, arrives at the front door of the Winslow home with Richie and asking for her son. After learning about Eddie's behavior in breaking his promise to Richie just to go to a date, Rachel, Carl and Harriette set him straight and force him to apologize. Also, Steve tries to cure Harriette's insomnia and succeeds when he unwittingly tells Waldo about Carl's back problems, via phone conversation recording. Guest stars: Jacqueline Ann Shaw as Angela, Diana Lee-Hsu as Mrs. Wong, Ryan Hart as Tommy
79	7	"An Officer and a Waldo"	John Tracy	David W. Duclon	November 6, 1992	447808	20.4
Eddie yells at Waldo over a misunderstanding and calls him an idiot. Waldo's fragile self-esteem takes a huge hit leading to a dangerous response: Join the US Army reserves. When Steve gets a phone call learning about Waldo's decision, Steve doesn't hesitate to set Eddie straight and they promptly to go after him just to get him to change his mind. However, when Steve and Eddie arrive at the base Waldo is at, Fort McGee, they run into trouble with the sergeant (David Graf). When Steve passes out, Eddie talks to Waldo about how he unleashed his anger on Waldo and apologizes by admitting he was just as much an idiot than who he called and the two become friends again. Luckily Waldo forgot to sign enlistment papers so they are free to leave. Meanwhile, Harriette must deal with a repairman (Dennis Burkley) who has a habit for overcharging his client and Harriette sets him straight. Guest stars: David Graf as Sergeant Shishka, Dennis Burkley as Phil, Danielle Nicolet as Vonda Mahoney, J. Lamont Pope as Recruit, Gregory Garcia as Army Soldier Lopez
80	8	"Just One Date"	Gary Menteer	Fred Fox, Jr.	November 13, 1992	447812	21.0
Steve, determined to go out with Laura, resorts to his most outlandish trick yet: Camping out on the rooftop of the Winslow home. Meanwhile, Richie tries to fight off the advances of the young girl, Gwendolyn (Naya Rivera), who has just moved to the neighborhood. Guest stars: Naya Rivera as Gwendolyn, Benjamin Lum as Delivery Man, Donna Lynn Leavy as Mrs. Tannen
81	9	"The Oddest Couple"	John Tracy	Jim Geoghan	November 20, 1992	447810	22.3
Eddie gets into a fight with Carl over house rules after he comes home late, while Steve gets into a quarrel with his parents over his scientific experiments constantly going awry. The result: The two become roommates in a run-down apartment. They soon realize it's harder than they think when Eddie's irresponsibility and Steve's science collide. When Carl comes for a visit, Steve proves to be a helping hand to get him and Eddie to reconcile. Guest star: Gerrit Graham as Landlord
82	10	"It's Beginning to Look a Lot Like Urkel"	John Tracy	David W. Duclon & Gary Menteer	December 11, 1992	447815	22.2
While Christmas shopping, Laura really snaps at Steve for accidentally breaking an expensive crystal vase, which she had intended to give Harriette as a Christmas gift. She fumes that she wishes he could only see what it's like to be her, then maybe he'd understand. So, Laura's guardian angel, Tyrone (T.K. Carter) grants her wish and Steve Urkel becomes Steve Winslow (in the alternate reality version). However, he points out there's a catch to her wish. In order for Laura to learn her lesson in being careful for what she wishes for, Tyrone tells her that she must walk a mile in Steve's shoes as Laura Urkel so she'll endure what life is like as him in being yelled at and having her feelings hurt. The horrible experience teaches Laura a valuable lesson and she asks Tyrone to let her relive the moment when Steve came to pick her up to apologize to him. Guest stars: T.K. Carter as Tyrone, Mari Deese as Disgruntled Passenger
83	11	"Muskrat Love"	John Tracy	Regina Stewart	January 8, 1993	447813	22.3
While Eddie tries to date a girl that his friends think is undesirable, Laura tries to get Maxine out of a date with Ted that Laura set up. Meanwhile, thinking it would boost her self-esteem, Carl gives Harriette exercise equipment for her birthday, to no surprise, it makes her feel worse. However, Carl is able to save the day and convinces her that he still sees her as beautiful. At the Sadie Hawkins' dance, Eddie stands up to Weasel and gives him a piece of his mind for making him break his date. Guest stars: Michole Briana White as Melissa, Susan Dawkins as Guess Your Weight Girl, Joshua Lux as Student in Kissing Booth, Gregory Garcia as High School Student Gregory
84	12	"Hot Wheels"	John Tracy	Regina Stewart	January 15, 1993	447802	23.3
Carl buys Eddie a used 1977 Dodge Monaco police car at an auction, hoping the two can restore it together. Only thing is, he would rather bond with Waldo while restoring the beat-up car into a hot rod. Harriette soon sets Eddie straight for it and he decides to let Carl restore the car with him. Meanwhile, Laura meets a guy named Ted selling candy, they quickly attract, and they agree to go out on a date. Soon, there seems to be a little problem with Steve's new superglue, when it causes the nerd's hand to become bonded with Laura's shoulder. Note: This episode was supposed to air on September 25, 1992, but was delayed.
85	13	"The Way the Ball Bounces"	Jeffrey Ganz	Stephen Langford	January 22, 1993	447817	23.2
Both Eddie and Laura learn their lesson in education and sleep. In Eddie's case, he is wooed by a slick-talking college recruiter, who wants him only for his basketball skills and not his meager academic credentials. In order to teach him that education is more important than sports, Harriette invites a college student working at a grocery store to explain the dangers of putting basketball over education. While Eddie is enlightened, it also teaches Carl the dangers of encouraging sports over education. Meanwhile, a sleep famished Laura enlists Steve to cover as her so she can go to the library to study for the PSAT. She later learns a hard lesson that sleep is vital, when she comes home disheveled and stressed out from the library. End Result: Laura finally goes to sleep and Steve is chased by Carl for being inside her room (a direct violation to his house rules). Guest stars: Jack Riley as Wayne, Christopher B. Duncan as Sam The Slam
86	14	"A Thought in the Dark"	Gary Menteer	Bob Illes & James R. Stein	January 29, 1993	447814	N/A
Wanting to get Steve off her back once and for all, Laura asks Ted to set the nerd up. He chooses his cousin, the beautiful Myra Monkhouse (Michelle Thomas), someone who just loves Steve. The foursome head off to a Dave Koz concert, where Waldo is working as an usher. When Myra kisses Steve, he freaks out and decides to make a speech about his love for Laura, announcing that he'll redouble his efforts to pursue her. He is met with applause as Laura tries to grab him but Ted pulls her back. Meanwhile, Harriette discovers that Carl is covering for Judy after she ruined her expensive dress. Soon they discuss when to help out their kids. Guest star: Dave Koz as Himself
87	15	"Tender Kisses"	John Tracy	Fred Fox, Jr. & Jim Geoghan	February 5, 1993	447818	23.7
Unable to get tickets to a Tracie Spencer concert, Eddie, Waldo and Weasel plot to sneak into the singer's hotel room to procure them. Eddie is able to fool the bodyguard (Stoney Jackson) by pretending to be a bellboy delivering flowers. However, Weasel, who is disguised as a maid, is caught after insulting the guard and thrown out. Meanwhile, Carl is suspicious when he constantly sees Harriette writing in her diary and gets Urkel to read it to him, only to discover that she had planted a fake diary because she was aware he'll read it anyway and only wanted to teach him a lesson in respecting her personal thoughts. Guest stars: Tracie Spencer as Herself, Stoney Jackson as Lee
88	16	"Heart Strings"	John Tracy	David W. Duclon & Gary Menteer	February 12, 1993	447819	21.4
Laura and Ted agree to end their relationship, and a heartsick Laura has no one to love for Valentine's Day until Steve pays her a visit. Meanwhile, Richie tries to fight off Gwendolyn who wants him to be her "Daddy Mac"! Also Carl gets into a brief quarrel with Harriette for the way she behaves at a romantic restaurant and eventually they reconcile. Guest star: Naya Rivera as Gwendolyn
89	17	"It's a Mad, Mad, Mad House"	John Tracy	Regina Stewart	February 19, 1993	447811	23.9
After Eddie pulls a classroom prank, his teacher (Debra Jo Rupp) wants to refer him to the principal. Knowing he could face dismissal from the basketball team for this offense from his coach if he got one more bad report from his teachers, he relates a sob story about how he comes from a dysfunctional family. The teacher is so upset that she later confides in Steve, who recommends that she pay a visit to this family, unaware that she is talking about the Winslows. What Miss Connors observes is exactly what Eddie described: she sees a highly chaotic household, thanks in part to Harriette having gone "on strike" after she became frustrated with her family constantly henpecking her. Having ignored Estelle's previous warning not to push her, the rest of the family must endure fending for themselves. When Carl and Harriette discovers Eddie's wrongdoing from Steve, Harriette decides to explain to Miss Connors what's really going on. Carl takes Eddie to the kitchen and reprimand him for his behavior. He points out that it was wrong of Eddie to not only lie to his teacher but also making light of people who actually comes from dysfunctional families in which the results are often tragic. Eddie realizes his actions are wrong and decides to accept responsibility for himself. Even Carl will punish Eddie later after this incident. In the end, Carl confronts Eddie, Laura, Judy and Richie for taking Harriette for granted. He makes them promise her to help out around the house more and the family reluctant to agree. Harriette ends the strike and tells the family to start cleaning. Carl convinces her to take everyone out to dinner and let him clean up the house, since he was partly responsible in setting a terrible example. Guest stars: Debra Jo Rupp as Miss Connors, Tom Kindle as Cleaning Man Note: This episode was supposed to air on November 27, 1992, but was delayed.
90	18	"Higher Anxiety"	Richard Correll	Jim Geoghan	February 26, 1993	447816	23.1
Steve reveals to Eddie that his girlfriend, Oneshia (Mari Morrow), is a two-timer. After he breaks off the relationship, Eddie goes into a week-long depression. Waldo and Steve try to cheer him up by taking him to a party. When Eddie steps outside to get some air, Waldo and Steve find him on the fire escape. Worried that Eddie might be contemplating suicide, they go outside to try to convince him to come back inside. However, their combined weight breaks the fire escape. With teamwork, Eddie, Steve, and Waldo manage to get back inside, and Eddie realizes that his friends are more important than a girl. However, he does take comfort knowing that Oneisha's current boyfriend had his car crushed by a fire escape ladder. Meanwhile, Estelle and her beau, Fletcher, have really advanced their relationship and are contemplating marriage, much to Carl's chagrin, after a white water rafting trip. When Harriette calls him out for hurting his mother, she learns Carl's real reason for not accepting their relationship. Guest stars: Arnold Johnson as Fletcher Thomas, Mari Morrow as Oneisha
91	19	"Mama's Wedding"	Gary Menteer	Sara V. Finney & Vida Spears	March 5, 1993	447820	22.8
Carl finally comes to terms with his mother's impending marriage to Fletcher, but the two get into a fight over the wedding arrangements. He wants a big wedding bash for them. However, Estelle just wants a small, family wedding, which Carl eventually agrees to. However, his original plan for a huge bash might come to fruition anyway, since Eddie had planned a huge house party for a weekend his parents would be out of town. The problem is Waldo wrote inaccurate invitations to the house party, advertising the gathering as the same night as the wedding. In the end, Estelle and Fletcher gets a wedding they'll remember for a long time and Carl grounds Eddie for his plans to have a party. Guest stars: Naya Rivera as Gwendolyn, Arnold Johnson as Fletcher Thomas, Jester Hairston as William "Skippy" Thomas, Ron Taylor as Pastor Peebles Note: Final appearance of Jaimee Foxworth as Judy Winslow.
92	20	"Pulling Teeth"	Gary Menteer	David W. Duclon & Gary Menteer	March 19, 1993	447822	22.8
A five-way phone conversation between Eddie, Waldo, Steve, Laura and Maxine results in the unlikeliest of couples—Waldo and Maxine. And the two really hit it off! Meanwhile, Richie struggles with getting rid of a loose baby tooth, prompting Carl to help get it out. However, he unknowingly falls into his own trick while he was trying to help Richie get rid of a loose baby tooth, as Steve comes over for a visit.
93	21	"Walk on the Wild Side"	John Tracy	Sara V. Finney & Vida Spears	March 26, 1993	447809	21.8
Armed with fake ID's and a desire to dump her "Miss Goody Two-Shoes" image, Laura and her friends go to Club Buff (a male strip club), not knowing that Harriette, Estelle and Rachel would also be there that night. Steve learns of this from Carl then goes to the club to warn Laura. To get into the club, he pretends to be a dancer, and winds up on stage to perform a striptease. He also makes heartfelt speech to warn Laura to leave Club Buff before her family finds out. When Harriette catches her, she takes Laura home to talk to her. While understanding the need to prove her friends wrong, Harriette convinces Laura to do it the right way by resisting temptation and staying true to herself. Meanwhile, Eddie and Waldo have their own boys night out with two ugly women. Guest stars: Venus DeMilo Thomas as K.C. Kenny Johnson as Derek, Bari K. Willerford as Bouncer, Wayne Dillon as Officer Bob, Mindy Sterling as Woman, Robert Kotto as Waiter, Dennis Parizek as Erik the Viking
94	22	"Hot Stuff"	Gary Menteer	Stephen Langford	April 30, 1993	447821	18.5
Myra asks Laura for advice in snaring the man of her dreams – Steve "Hot Stuff" Urkel. Meanwhile, Eddie learns a hard lesson in stolen property after buying a discounted car stereo from Weasel's friend. After showing it to Steve, he quickly suspects that the stereo had been stolen and Carl takes action by taking Eddie's car to the precinct to get it removed.
95	23	"Stormy Weather"	John Tracy	Fred Fox, Jr.	May 7, 1993	447823	16.1
Laura decides to go to the school dance with the class hunk Jimmy, and she encourages Steve to take Myra as his date. Jimmy doesn't like Steve and tells Laura that her friendship with Steve would ruin his reputation and that she needs to stop associating with Steve if she wants to keep dating him. At the dance, Laura does chat with Steve and Jimmy snaps that he thought they agreed she would stop seeing Steve. Laura confronts Jimmy by telling him that no one tells her what to do, and Steve is a decent guy who is different from Jimmy in one key respect: he's at the dance with someone who wants to be with him, as she dumps Jimmy on the spot. Meanwhile, Steve attempts to hide his nerdy reputation from Myra as he takes her to the dance, but he has a good time until he manages to unintentionally trigger the sprinkler system and ruin the entire dance. He later shows at the Winslows' and talks to Laura about the night's events: they both laugh about his tendency for disaster, Steve says that Myra still likes him anyway, and Laura admits she didn't accede to Jimmy's demands because she has come to like Steve as a friend. Guest stars: Ross Leon as Jimmy, Tracy Lanier as Quesadilla Faldo, Tina Thomas as Gloria, Portrait as Themselves
96	24	"Buds 'n' Buns"	John Tracy	Jim Geoghan	May 14, 1993	447824	14.7
Steve decides to at last advance his budding relationship with Myra. Laura soon misses him when he stops visiting her and Rachel consoles her. Later on, Steve is horrified when he sees how jealous and possessive Myra is during their visit to the Winslow home. She somehow has concluded that Laura is serious competition for the nerd's affections, even though Laura maintains that she and Steve are friends. Meanwhile, Eddie is promoted to supervising manager at the Mighty Weenie, where Carl has taken a part-time job and soon finds himself answering to his son. They get into a serious fight until Harriette reminds them not to let that interfere with their close relationship. Guest stars: Michael James McDonald as Manager, Gabriel Pelino as Customer
