= Family Matters season 2 =

Family Matters
- Season 2
- Starring: Reginald VelJohnson; Jo Marie Payton; Rosetta LeNoire; Darius McCrary; Kellie Shanygne Williams; Jaimee Foxworth; Bryton McClure; Jaleel White; Telma Hopkins
- No. of episodes: 25

Release
- Original network: ABC
- Original release: September 21, 1990 – May 3, 1991

Season chronology
- ← Previous; Season 1 Next → Season 3

The second season of Family Matters originally aired on ABC between September 21, 1990, and May 3, 1991. From this season onward, Bryton McClure and Jaleel White are joining the cast in the opening credits.

== Premise ==
In season two, after Leroy quits his job at Leroy's Place, because Steve burns the restaurant down, Rachel is promoted to open up her new diner titled Rachel's Place, earning her new employee members Steve and Laura.

== Main cast ==
- Reginald VelJohnson as Carl Winslow
- Jo Marie Payton as Harriette Winslow
- Rosetta LeNoire as Estelle Winslow
- Darius McCrary as Eddie Winslow
- Kellie Shanygne Williams as Laura Winslow
- Jaimee Foxworth as Judy Winslow
- Bryton McClure as Richie Crawford
- Jaleel White as Steve Urkel
- Telma Hopkins as Rachel Crawford

== Episodes ==
No. overall	No. in season	Title	Directed by	Written by	Original release date	Prod. code	U.S. viewers (millions)
23	1	"Rachel's Place"	Richard Correll	David W. Duclon & Gary Menteer	September 21, 1990	446451	24.3
After Steve accidentally burns down Leroy's, the local teen hangout, Rachel, with Steve's help, wants to open up her own diner and call it Rachel's Place. She asks Carl and Harriette to help obtain the funds, but because Carl invested $5,000 on a stock (which has since gone down) they realize they don't have enough money. However, Estelle comes up with the funds needed, and Rachel's Place has its grand opening a while later. Note: Jaleel White becomes a full time cast member starting with this episode. Guest stars: Bridgid Coulter as Jolene, John Hancock as Leroy, William Long Jr. as Fire Inspector
24	2	"Torn Between Two Lovers"	Gary Menteer	Janet Lynne Jackson	September 21, 1990	446454	24.3
Steve's thrilled when he thinks Rachel—who's actually dating a loan officer also named Steve—has a crush on him. That is, until he realizes that he must remain true to his love for Laura. Guest stars: Bridgid Coulter as Jolene, Dominic Hoffman as Steve Webster
25	3	"Marriage 101"	Richard Correll	Sally Lapiduss & Pamela Eells	September 28, 1990	446452	23.5
Steve is paired with Laura in a class assignment about marriage. Steve goes the extra mile to be a good husband, but an exasperated Laura sends him home at once. When she goes to Harriette for advice in getting Steve to leave her alone, her mother reprimands her ungrateful behavior towards Steve. Laura learns that Harriette is actually envious of the attention Steve had been showing her. This is because Carl had been taking her for granted and was paying less romantic attention to her as of late. This deeply concerns her and angers both Rachel and Estelle. While Laura is enlightened, Carl gets the hint and promises to do better. Guest stars: Susan Krebs as Ms. Steuben, Cherie Johnson as Maxine Johnson, Clint Hyson as Mark Healy
26	4	"Flashpants"	Gerren Keith	Stephen Langford	October 5, 1990	446455	23.2
Carl and Harriette enter the precinct's annual dance contest, but find themselves challenged by Sgt. Charlie Carnellie, an egotistical fellow officer. Carl hurts his back while practicing, but heals just in time for the contest. He and Charlie tie for the win; however, right before the dance-off, Carl hurts his back again while bowing. At the same time, Charlie trips over a chair and hurts his ankle leaving both in pain. Just as Charlie and his wife are about to forfeit, Carl mentions that he wants to settle for a tie (which is proven to be against the rules), and Harriette tells Carl she's proud of him for being a good sport. Guest stars: Steve Vinovich as Master of Ceremonies, Cathy Susan Pyles as Helen, Eddie Mekka as Charlie
27	5	"The Crash Course"	Gary Menteer	Manny Basanese	October 12, 1990	446456	23.7
After failing his driving test (due to Carl shaking him up in a practice test the day before), an unlicensed Eddie (in order to save face in front of his girlfriend Jolene) takes the family car against Laura's admonition to do the right thing and tell his girlfriend the truth. He later regrets not heeding her advice when he loses control and crashes it into the front of the house. Wanting to keep his friend out of trouble, Steve takes the fall. Despite Laura's admonition to confess and do the right thing, Eddie refuses to do so; that is, until Steve announces his family has enrolled him in military school and gives Eddie a going away present: a baseball and catcher's mitt. Now guilty for his actions, Eddie does the right thing and confesses to Carl for his wrongdoing. Angered by this, Carl grounds Eddie for a month and tells him he has to wait two months before he can take his driving test again and take odd jobs around the house to pay for the wreck, and also demands that Eddie visit the Urkel home to explain himself. Guest star: Bridgid Coulter as Jolene
28	6	"Boxcar Blues"	Mark Linn-Baker	Fred Fox, Jr.	October 19, 1990	446453	23.5
Carl is assigned Steve as part of a police ride-along program. While staking out a wanted suspect in a railroad stockyard, Carl and Steve accidentally wind up locked in a livestock rail car. Eddie — who earlier rejected Carl's offer to participate in the ride-along program — tries to get a modeling career, but is soundly rejected and begins to reconsider his dreams. Guest star: Barry Jenner as Lt. Lieu Murtaugh
29	7	"Dog Day Halloween"	Gerren Keith	David W. Duclon & Fred Fox, Jr.	October 26, 1990	446460	25.5
Steve learns a painful lesson when he tries to make good on his fantasy of saving Laura, while both of them are held hostage during a bank robbery on Halloween. When Carl saves the day, Steve admits his disappointment in not stopping the robber, and Carl consoles him that he did the right thing. Guest stars: Doris Hess as Marcy, Barry Jenner as Lt. Lieu Murtaugh, Randy Josselyn as Rodney Beckett, Mark Nassar as Robber
30	8	"Cousin Urkel"	Gary Menteer	Sally Lapiduss & Pamela Eells	November 2, 1990	446457	24.8
After Steve annoys the entire neighborhood with his late-night playing of "Feelings" to serenade Laura (at Eddie's encouragement), he is sent to live with relatives in Mississippi as per his parents punishment. The Winslows think they're in for a few weeks without being bothered by him, but learn that Steve's absence was only temporary when Myrtle Urkel (Jaleel White in a dual role), the splitting image of her cousin, arrives. Myrtle immediately sets her sights on Eddie, and Laura does everything she can to get revenge on Eddie by encouraging Myrtle to seduce Eddie at night. While she succeeds, Carl and Harriette finds out about the prank war. Angered by Eddie and Laura's behavior, Carl and Harriette ground both of them for it and tell them to apologize to both Steve and Myrtle at once.
31	9	"Dedicated to the One I Love"	Gary Menteer	Sara V. Finney & Vida Spears	November 9, 1990	446458	25.9
Harriette catches Carl in the middle of an intimate moment with their sexy new neighbor Loretta, and worries that he may be drifting away from their marriage. When Harriette voices her concerns over Loretta possibly stealing Carl from her, Estelle consoles her and maintains that Carl needs to see their neighbor for who she is. Laura, meanwhile, urges Steve to make over a shy classmate and regrets it. Steve then tells Laura that he introduced the classmate to the president of the chess club with the belief that Laura is interested in him. Later on, Carl discovers that Harriette's warning about Loretta is true and tells her to leave. Afterwards, he apologizes to Harriette for not believing her sooner. When they hear music from his underpants, Carl manages to convince Harriette he bought something that expresses his love for her. Guest stars: Susan Beaubian as Loretta, Caryn Ward as Susie
32	10	"The Science Project"	Gary Menteer	Sally Lapiduss & Pamela Eells	November 16, 1990	446461	26.0
After Laura deliberately becomes science partners with Steve in order to get a good grade, she has a dream in which Steve has created an atomic bomb for a science project, and when it is about to detonate nobody will listen to her. As her dream ends, Laura realizes that she must apologize to Steve and be honest about why she wanted to be his partner. Guest stars: Cherie Johnson as Maxine Johnson, Joe Mays as Mr. Nagy, Aaron Lohr as Student #1, Sky Berdahl as Student #2, Crystal Jenious as Girl Student
33	11	"Requiem for an Urkel"	Joel Zwick	David W. Duclon	November 23, 1990	446462	25.4
Laura is being antagonized and bullied by Willie Fuffner (Larenz Tate) for refusing to go to the dance with him. He chases all of her prospect male dates to the sidelines until she's forced to go to the dance with Steve, who stands up for Laura and gets into a fight with Willie at school. Instead of taking the sensible route and getting them to work things out between themselves, the coach decides they should get it on in the ring. This leads Carl and Eddie to teach the uncoordinated Steve everything he needs to know about defending himself in the ring. During the fight, Steve is beaten easily, but still persists. Eventually, the guys Willie bullied stand up for themselves, tired of being pushed around by him. Willie eventually flees, and Urkel is named the winner by forfeit. Meanwhile, Estelle finds a new man in Fletcher Thomas (Arnold Johnson), much to Carl's dismay. Guest stars: David Hayward as Coach Redding, Arnold Johnson as Fletcher Thomas, Larenz Tate as Willie Fuffner, Aaron Lohr as Greg, Joshua Waggoner as Student, Tyrone Tann as Student, Salim Grant as Student #2
34	12	"Fast Eddie Winslow"	Gerren Keith	Fred Fox, Jr.	November 30, 1990	446459	25.8
Eddie loses a bet with pool hustler Boyd "Buck" Higgins (Tim Ryan) and, unable to pay off his debt, soon finds himself, Rodney (Randy Josselyn) and Steve being threatened with serious harm. Steve loans Eddie and Rodney the money they need, but challenges Buck to a double or nothing match ($500). He proves to be a good match for Buck and comes close to winning the money. Realizing that he could lose the bet, Buck and his friends then intentionally break Steve's glasses, leaving him unable to see. Steve is about to forfeit until Carl and Estelle show up. Finding out about Buck's breaking Steve's glasses along with Eddie's gambling, Carl calls Buck out for cheating and tells him that unless he wants to go to jail he'd better let Carl (and Estelle, who takes one shot) step in for Steve. He and Estelle win and Eddie thanks Carl for showing up. Carl then reprimands him for gambling and Steve shows up to make Eddie uphold his promise. Meanwhile, Judy is on her way to getting a D in English and must write a book report about "Swiss Family Robinson" after she doesn't read the book. Guest stars: Randy Josselyn as Rodney Beckett, Irvin Mosley Jr. as Kevin, Michael Rapposelli as Chuckie, Tim Ryan as Boyd Higgins
35	13	"Have Yourself a Merry Winslow Christmas"	Richard Correll	David W. Duclon	December 21, 1990	446465	23.7
Steve is all alone for Christmas, his family having left him behind and the Winslows shunning him after he breaks Laura's old-fashioned Christmas ornament. The nerd has also promised Richie that Santa will deliver him the season's hottest toy, Freddie Teddy, a story-telling teddy bear that Carl seems to have a little trouble securing. Eventually, Laura apologizes to Steve after she finds him feeling sad and alone in his basement, on Christmas Eve. She also invites him to spend Christmas with her and her family, and Steve accepts. Soon the Winslows learn there's nothing wrong with Steve still believing in Santa, especially when they discover his letter (with which he asked Santa to let him spend Christmas with the Winslows) and Richie is happy with his present. Guest stars: Ellen Albertini Dow as Mrs. Ferguson, Peggy Mannix as Customer, Gabriel Pelino as Clerk
36	14	"Ice Station Winslow"	Richard Correll	Gary Menteer	January 4, 1991	446464	28.6
Eddie and Judy both have a lesson in having appreciation for family. In Eddie's case, Steve tags along on his and Carl's ice fishing trip to Lake Wannamuck and lends a crucial helping hand when Carl falls through thin ice. The harrowing experience teaches Eddie a valuable lesson in what the consequences would have been if Steve hadn't been around to rescue Carl and promises to spend more time with him. Meanwhile with Richie being the baby of the household, Judy feels like she's getting less attention and decides to pay him back. She ruins his penguin costume in front of Rachel, leading her to complain to Harriette about Judy's behavior. Later on, Laura reprimands her sister for her behavior and soon teaches Judy that there are some advantages to being the older kid. Guest star: Michael "Shrimp" Chambers
37	15	"Son"	Gary Menteer	José Rivera	January 11, 1991	446463	30.4
Rachel asks Carl to build a playhouse for Richie, but Carl cannot find his screwdriver. Eddie tells Carl he used it to fix his bike, and ignores Carl so he can stick to his phone call with Jolene. Carl turns the phone off and attempts to get him to help look for it. Eddie keeps showing a lack of interest in his father's concerns and is grounded for it. Defying Carl and ignoring Laura's warning to stay put, he sneaks out and goes on his date with Jolene. Eddie comes back then and tries to hide the evidence upstairs in his room. However, Carl ironically appears while he is going upstairs. Carl sees the evidence and grounds him for one month, then two more months for his attitude. Carl and Eddie get into a heated argument over house rules, prompting the eldest Winslow son to threaten to move out (even though he doesn't really have a plan). Harriette makes the two sit at a table and she tells the story of when Eddie was born. After Carl talks to Eddie, Eddie decides to stay home saying, "Dad, I'd like to stay", and Carl saying, "I would like that too, son". Guest star: Lawrence Cook as Doctor
38	16	"Do the Right Thing"	Gary Menteer	Sally Lapiduss & Pamela Eells	January 18, 1991	446466	25.9
A lesson in conscience, Carl wants to keep a valuable ($15,450) diamond bracelet he found so that he and Harriette can go on a Caribbean cruise. Carl eventually finds the owner of the bracelet, who ironically could not come as soon as she wanted to because she was on that Caribbean cruise. At the same time, Steve wrangles with helping Laura's current boyfriend, Todd, maintain his academic eligibility for playing basketball. When Todd asks Steve to tutor him, he is tempted to give Todd the wrong answers, but eventually helps him get a B in Geometry. However, things end well for Steve when he learns that Laura broke up with Todd anyway because all he ever talks about is basketball and the only song that he knows is Sweet Georgia Blues. Steve is convinced of her interest in him. Guest stars: Keith Cameron as Todd Helms, Natalie Core as Mrs. Peavy, Joshua Klausner as Teen, Neary Plummer as Mr. Sniplitsky
39	17	"High Hopes"	Gary Menteer	Fred Fox, Jr. & Denise Snee	February 1, 1991	446467	28.3
Steve helps Carl cure his fear of heights by going on a hot-air balloon ride. Things go wrong when a nearby plane causes Steve to fall out, but Carl manages to save Steve's life. Meanwhile, Rachel helps Harriette win a radio contest, but they start to argue about who should get the car that they recently won. After fighting for a while, Estelle suggests they sell the car and split the money evenly. Guest stars: Barry Jenner as Lt. Lieu Murtaugh, Jim Doughan as Jimmy
40	18	"Life of the Party"	Gary Menteer	Janet Lynne Jackson	February 8, 1991	446468	30.9
Steve teaches everyone how to "Do the Urkel" at Maxine's rooftop party, but the party may be his last when Willie Fuffner spikes the punch with whiskey as revenge for being humiliated. An intoxicated Steve soon tumbles from the rooftop and is clinging for dear life. Rachel ends up risking her life to try to save Steve, while Willie and his pal Waldo end up in juvenile hall. Meanwhile, the Winslows are trying to decide what their one-week vacation will be, and Harriette decides to take Carl's idea to go to Lake Geneva, Wisconsin. Guest stars: Cherie Johnson as Maxine Johnson, Larenz Tate as Willie Fuffner, Robert Balderson as Cop
41	19	"Busted"	Richard Correll	David W. Duclon & Fred Fox, Jr.	February 15, 1991	446470	29.8
Both father and son each have a lesson in confessing their mistakes. Eddie wrecks the family car, again, and it cost $800 to repair the car. Laura suggests he do the right thing and confess to Carl for the wreck. Eddie refuses out of fear of being grounded again and she warns him that he'll regret it one day. To obtain the funds and repair the damage without Carl noticing, he and Steve visit a local bakery that is the front for an illegal gambling operation. Steve wins $32,000, but as they are about to leave, the police show up. Meanwhile, Carl accidentally scatters Harriette and Rachel's great aunt's ashes into a trash can with chimney ashes, thinking the urn is a candy tin. When he realizes it's an urn, he attempts to cover it up by putting a mixture of their great aunt's ashes with that of the chimney ashes. Carl must deal with the consequences of Harriette's anger when she learns the truth of his disrespect for her and Rachel's great aunt. He also must punish Eddie for not only being arrested for gambling at an illegal casino, but also wrecking his beloved car. Guest stars: Felecia M. Bell as Woman, Ken Kerman as Cop, John Mariano as Stickman, Tom Milanovich as Guard, Georgy Paul as Mom, Jeri Gray as Older Lady in Casino
42	20	"Fight the Good Fight"	Gary Menteer	Sara V. Finney & Vida Spears	March 1, 1991	446469	30.6
Laura and Steve push for Black History classes in their school, but things quickly turn ugly thanks to their racist classmates. However, Estelle encourages Laura to continue fighting for what she believes in after revealing her own encounter with racism when she was young. Meanwhile, Carl attempts to fix a defective vacuum cleaner, despite Harriette warning him to be sensible and buy a replacement. Guest stars: Jay Bradford as Mark, Cherie Johnson as Maxine Johnson, Susan Krebs as Ms. Steuben, Clyde Kusatsu as Principal Edgar Shimata, David Markus as Darryl, Patrick J. Pieters as Gary, Antonio Lewis Todd as Fred, Bobby Wynn as Buddy
43	21	"Taking Credit"	Richard Correll	David W. Duclon	March 15, 1991	446472	29.2
Wanting to teach a lesson, Rachel tells Judy and Richie stories about how Eddie and Lt. Murtaugh each wanted to take credit for things someone else did. In Eddie's case, Steve wrote him a story for a writing contest. When Eddie refused to keep a promise to Steve, as he had promised Rodney to go camping with him, Steve calls Eddie out for his selfish deeds. Steve reminds him that even though they are friends it gives Eddie no right to take him for granted. He ends it by mentioning that he will not only end their friendship, but also tell on Eddie to Carl. Even Laura is impressed by Steve in taking a stand against her brother. This prompts Eddie to apologize, confess to his wrongdoing to his family and keep his promise to Steve. In Carl's case, he helped foil a crime spree with little help from Lt. Murtaugh. However, he shares credit with Lt. Murtaugh when Carl admits that the former is actually camera shy during a news interview, and this earned him Murtaugh's respect. Guest stars: Barry Jenner as Lt. Lieu Murtaugh, Mary Ingersoll as Reporter #1, Christopher Darga as Reporter #2
44	22	"Finding the Words"	Richard Correll	Fred Fox, Jr.	March 22, 1991	446471	28.8
Jimmy Holmes (Paul Winfield) claims to be a long-lost family friend of the Winslows, but his relationship turns out to be much closer when he tells Carl that his name is Jimmy Baines, Harriette and Rachel's father, who walked out on them years earlier. When he came back to reconcile with his family, their mother denounced Jimmy by telling him that she had told their daughters that he died in Korea. Since then, Jimmy changed his last name to Holmes in order to see his grandchildren in secret. When the truth comes out, Harriette is unsure if she could forgive Jimmy and admits her resentment for his actions in leaving their family. Rachel counsels her that if they don't take the opportunity and reconcile with their father, then they'd make the same mistake as their mother did. Guest star: Paul Winfield as Jimmy Baines
45	23	"Skip to My Lieu"	Richard Correll	Charlene Seeger	April 1, 1991	446474	26.6
Carl's chances at a promotion hinge on his ability to get Lt. Murtaugh a date with Rachel. Meanwhile, Steve hopes to vie for Laura's affections with an ID bracelet. But when Rachel and Laura reject the two, Steve and Lt. Murtaugh spend the rest of their evening at Rachel's Place bonding while drinking root beer floats. Guest star: Barry Jenner as Lt. Lieu Murtaugh
46	24	"The Good, the Bad, and the Urkel"	Richard Correll	Sally Lapiduss & Pamela Eells	April 26, 1991	446475	26.5
After getting into a brawl with Steve's father over the Urkels' smelly backyard compost heap, Carl dreams of a feud between their two families in the Old West. There, he is the local sheriff who has shot and killed Doc Urkel. Before long, his outlaw son comes to town looking for revenge. Challenged to a quickdraw, Carl is engaged in a shootout with Two-Gun Urkel, the most annoying gunslinger in the West. He ends up shooting and killing Two-Gun right as he wakes up, and realizes he should apologize to Steve and his father. Guest stars: Tom Bishop as Cowboy #1, Victor Wilson as Cowboy #2, Steve Viall as Cowboy #3, Ray Woodfork as Cowboy
47	25	"I Should Have Done Something"	Richard Correll	David W. Duclon	May 3, 1991	446473	22.9
Carl is haunted by the memory of a hostage situation gone wrong and snaps at his own family even when they tell him it wasn't his fault. Even though Carl earned a commendation for his work in capturing a convenience store robber, he was unable to prevent the suspect from killing his elderly hostage. While visiting the grave of the elderly victim, his widow, Helen (Beah Richards), assures Carl that he wasn't at fault and it was just the robber who was at fault. Meanwhile, Steve receives Johnny Gill tickets, a singer that Laura adores, so he uses the tickets as a chance to get a date with Laura, until the last second. Laura thinks Steve is trying to flake out on their date and tells him they're going to the concert regardless. Guest stars: Beah Richards as Helen, Tiiu Leek as Karen Kosta, Ron Tank as Anchor Man
