= Family Matters season 1 =

Family Matters
- Season 1
- Starring: Reginald VelJohnson; Jo Marie Payton; Rosetta LeNoire; Darius McCrary; Kellie Shanygne Williams; Jaimee Foxworth; Joseph and Julius Wright; Telma Hopkins
- No. of episodes: 22

Release
- Original network: ABC
- Original release: September 22, 1989 – April 27, 1990

Season chronology
- Next → Season 2

The first season of the sitcom Family Matters originally aired on ABC from September 22, 1989 to April 27, 1990.

== Premise ==
In the first season, following the death of her husband, Robert, Rachel moves in to the Winslow household with her son, Richie. The house is occupied by Carl, Rachel's brother-in-law, Harriette, Rachel's sister, Estelle, Carl's mother, Edward (Eddie), Laura and Judy. The first appearance of Steve Urkel is in episode four (syndication only). In episode 12, it is revealed to the audience that he's in love with Laura.

== Main cast ==
- Reginald VelJohnson as Carl Winslow
- Jo Marie Payton as Harriette Winslow
- Rosetta LeNoire as Estelle Winslow
- Darius McCrary as Eddie Winslow
- Kellie Shanygne Williams as Laura Winslow
- Valerie Jones (pilot only) and Jaimee Foxworth as Judy Winslow
- Joseph and Julius Wright as Richie Crawford
- Telma Hopkins as Rachel Crawford

=== Recurring cast ===
- Jaleel White as Steve Urkel (Credited as "Guest Starring": episodes 12-17, 19-20. Credited as "Also Starring": episodes 18, 21-22 and rerun/syndication versions of episodes 4, 7, 8, 10)

== Episodes ==
No. overall	No. in season	Title	Directed by	Written by	Original release date	Prod. code	U.S. viewers (millions)
1	1	"The Mama Who Came to Dinner"	Joel Zwick	William Bickley & Michael Warren	September 22, 1989	445230	21.9
Mother Winslow moves in and immediately begins to usurp Carl's authority. Eddie wants to go out with his friends, but he has a strict curfew that complicates things with Carl.
2	2	"Two Income Family"	James O'Keefe	Robert Blair	September 29, 1989	446002	21.1
Harriette loses her job to automation, forcing the family into austerity measures while Carl stews over the family debts. Guest star: Larry Block as Mr. Seeger
3	3	"Short Story"	Joel Zwick	William Bickley & Michael Warren	October 6, 1989	446001	22.6
Rachel writes a short story with characters that seem all too familiar; Carl becomes obsessed with the family's out of proportion water bill.
4	4	"Rachel's First Date"	John Bowab	Sally Lapiduss & Pamela Eells	October 13, 1989	446004	20.8
The Winslows finally get to be alone together when Rachel accepts a date with a man from the church choir. Guest star: Peter Fitzsimmons as Alan Smith Note: The original cold opening for this episode was replaced for reruns and syndication with a new cold opening featuring Jaleel White as Steve Urkel (who would not debut until episode 1.12.)
5	5	"Straight A's"	John Bowab	Geoff Gordon & Gordon Lewis	October 20, 1989	446007	22.4
Eddie comes home with straight A's on his report card and the whole family is proud of him. Rodney comes over and tells him that he changed the grades on the report cards on the school computer. Eddie doesn't want to tell the truth because he fears that he will hurt Carl's feelings. Guest star: Randy Josselyn as Rodney Beckett
6	6	"Basketball Blues"	James O'Keefe	Barry Gold	November 3, 1989	446003	23.1
Carl's efforts to get Eddie psyched for a pro basketball career is enhanced by a visit from basketball star Bolton. However, he ends up learning a hard lesson in trying to force his dreams on Eddie when Bolton discovers everything Harriette warned him about is true. Guest star: Jacques Apollo Bolton as Will "The Thrill" Morgan
7	7	"Body Damage"	James O'Keefe	Ken Kuta	November 10, 1989	446005	21.9
Rachel takes an unauthorized spin in the classic automobile that Carl plans to drive in the Columbus Day Parade. Note: The original cold opening for this episode was replaced for reruns and syndication with a new cold opening featuring Jaleel White as Steve Urkel (who would not debut until episode 1.12.)
8	8	"Mr. Badwrench"	John Bowab	Alan Eisenstock & Larry Mintz	November 17, 1989	446006	20.6
Self-proclaimed handyman Carl decides to install a shower in Mother Winslow's quarters while she's out of town. Harriette tries to talk him out of it, reminding him of his previous disastrous attempts at fixing anything in the house. Guest star: Susan Merson as Sylvia Note: The original cold opening for this episode was replaced for reruns and syndication with a new cold opening featuring Jaleel White as Steve Urkel (who would not debut until episode 1.12.)
9	9	"Stake-Out"	James O'Keefe	Sally Lapiduss & Pamela Eells	November 24, 1989	446010	19.9
After Carl is on an all-night stakeout with his attractive new partner, Harriette finds a room key to Louise's Love Grotto in his pocket. Guest stars: Olivia Brown as Vanessa, J.W. Smith as Jake, Ken Foree as High Top
10	10	"False Arrest"	Peter Baldwin	Barry Gold	December 1, 1989	446008	22.2
The Winslows are aghast to discover that Carl has arrested their TV idol, Buddy Goodrich. However, their aghast turns to anger when they learn that Buddy broke the law in parking in the handicapped lot and how he treated Carl. Guest stars: Ron Glass as Buddy Goodrich, Thom Adcox-Hernandez as Roger, Neil Elliot as Stage Hand, Shawn Phelan as Mickey, Justin Gocke as Teddy Note: The original cold opening for this episode was replaced for reruns and syndication with a new cold opening featuring Jaleel White as Steve Urkel (who would not debut until episode 1.12.)
11	11	"The Quilt"	Peter Baldwin	David Scott Richardson	December 8, 1989	446009	24.0
Laura sells a quilt Grandmother Winslow considered an heirloom. Guest star: Ann Ryerson as Brooke Nash
12	12	"Laura's First Date"	Richard Correll	William Bickley & Michael Warren	December 15, 1989	446012	17.3
Laura wants to go to an upcoming dance with a good-looking guy. Carl and Eddie try to find Laura a date. Carl asks Steve Urkel to take Laura to the dance, while Eddie asks one of his friends to take her out. When Laura finds out what happened, she is humiliated. Guest stars: Ebonie Smith as Penny Peyser, Keith Williams as Tyrone, Adam Jeffries as Mark Note: First appearance of Jaleel White as Steve Urkel.
13	13	"Man's Best Friend"	Richard Correll	Robert Blair	January 5, 1990	446013	24.5
Carl has a rule he intends to enforce: No pets in the house; . . . until he meets a big, playful puppy who follows the kids home from school.
14	14	"Baker's Dozen"	James O'Keefe	Ken Kuta	January 12, 1990	446014	24.9
Thanks to Rachel's brainstorm, Carl could become the "king of tarts" if he shares his secret recipe for lemon tarts, which were a big hit at a local restaurant. Guest stars: Robert Gary Lee as Phil, Seth Sieunarine as Desmond Smith
15	15	"The Big Reunion"	Richard Correll	Alan Eisenstock & Larry Mintz	January 19, 1990	446011	26.0
Carl decides to lose weight before going to his high-school reunion. Guest stars: Ken Page as Darnell Watkins, Ron Taylor as Darnell Coleman, Lou D. Washington as Darnell Clark, Ellen Albertini Dow as Miss Gilbert, Louis Mustillo as Russell, Louise Heath as Janet Watkins, Sue Bugden as Nurse
16	16	"The Party"	Richard Correll	Ken Kuta	February 2, 1990	446016	24.6
Eddie is left in charge of Judy and Laura with a strict "No Friends Allowed" rule he must enforce. He obeys at first, but when dinner is ruined, Rodney saves them with pizza. This eventually culminates into a huge party that Eddie is unable to stop. Guest stars: Randy Josselyn as Rodney Beckett, Ebonie Smith as Penny Peyser, Tyren Perry as Shirley, Kendra Booth as Robin, Bruno Acalinas as Officer, Billy "Sly" Williams as Ken, John Lacy as Barry, Bentley Kyle Evans as Lamar, Curtis Baldwin as Football Player, Ron Kellum as Dancer
17	17	"The Big Fix"	Richard Correll	Sally Lapiduss & Pamela Eells	February 9, 1990	446017	22.8
Eddie persuades Laura to date a guy he's indebted to – Steve Urkel, who's decided to hold the Prince concert tickets Eddie wants to go. When Laura finally agrees, the date proves to be disastrous from the start. Meanwhile, Carl makes a horrible attempt to fix a wobbly chair, despite Harriette's admonition for him to be sensible and buy a replacement chair. Judy builds a diorama for school. Guest star: Gino Conforti as Maitre d'
18	18	"Sitting Pretty"	Richard Correll	Ken Kuta	February 23, 1990	446018	23.4
Laura's babysitting service floods the house with children at a bad time on the night Carl has invited his captain over and the night her babysitters decided to cancel just to see the Paula Abdul concert. Meanwhile, Rachel must contend with having to tell a new date about her being a mother. Guest stars: Teddy Wilson as Captain Casper Davenport, Tim Russ as Jeff, Malachi Pearson as Rambo, Christopher Fong as Kid #1, Jonathan Fong as Kid #2, Carlton McQueen as Murphy Twin #1, Raymond McQueen as Murphy Twin #2
19	19	"In a Jam"	Richard Correll	Alan Eisenstock & Larry Mintz	March 16, 1990	446019	21.7
Eddie wants to do the right thing when faced with protecting Steve from a bully who threatens to beat him up, which could get Eddie creamed as well. Guest stars: Randy Josselyn as Rodney Beckett, Ebonie Smith as Penny Peyser, Markus Redmond as Bull, Tom Henschel as Jimmie, Rick Scarry as Reporter
20	20	"The Candidate"	James O'Keefe	Barry Gold	March 23, 1990	446015	23.4
Eddie places image over integrity in his class president bid when image-maker Laura offers a thousand points of light to illuminate his campaign. Guest stars: Randy Josselyn as Rodney Beckett, Rachel Griffin as Margie Flatman, Ara Easley as Rebecca, Anaël Edwards as Pam Mitchell, Deonca Brown as Girl
21	21	"Bowl Me Over"	Richard Correll	Robert Blair	April 20, 1990	446021	20.3
The men vie with the women in a bowling match and Carl's philosophy about accepting defeat gracefully ends up in the gutter when Hariette aces him out.
22	22	"Rock Video"	Richard Correll	Geoff Gordon & Gordon Lewis	April 27, 1990	446020	19.9
When Eddie's big ego threatens to disband his group during the making of a rock video for a contest, the rest of the Winslows offer some ideas. Guest stars: Randy Josselyn as Rodney Beckett, Chance Quinn as Jerry, Bumper Robinson as Kyle

== See also ==
- List of Family Matters episodes
