= The Mama Who Came to Dinner =

- Family Matters episode
- Episode no.: Season 1 Episode 1
- Directed by: Joel Zwick
- Written by: William Bickley; Michael Warren
- Production code: 445230
- Original air date: September 22, 1989
- Running time: 21 minutes

Guest appearances
- Bronson Pinchot as Balki Bartokomous; Mark Linn-Baker as Larry Appleton

Episode chronology
← Previous —	Next → "Two-Income Family"
- Family Matters (season 1)

"The Mama Who Came to Dinner" is the pilot episode and series premiere of the American sitcom Family Matters, which is a spin-off of the American sitcom Perfect Strangers, which is set in Chicago. The episode was directed by Joel Zwick and written by William Bickley and Michael Warren, and originally aired on ABC on September 22, 1989.

In the episode, police sergeant Carl Winslow (Reginald VelJohnson) and his wife Harriette (Jo Marie Payton) prepare for the arrival of his mother Estelle (Rosetta LeNoire), who is moving in to live with them. While Carl confronts his mother's want to usurp his authority over his family, his son Eddie (Darius McCrary) tries to convince him to let him go to a party.

The episode marks the only appearance of Valerie Jones as Judy Winslow before she was replaced with Jaimee Foxworth in the following episode. In its initial airing, "The Mama Who Came to Dinner" received mixed reviews from critics.

== Synopsis ==
Police officer Carl Winslow (Reginald VelJohnson), his wife Harriette (Jo Marie Payton), and their three children prepare for the arrival of his mother Estelle (Rosetta LeNoire), who is moving in to live with them in their Chicago home. While Carl confronts his mother's want to usurp his authority over his entire family, his son Eddie (Darius McCrary) tries to convince him to let him go to a party that would result in him violating his curfew. After various discussions, Carl lets Eddie go to the party. The episode ends with the Winslow family singing "He's Got the Whole World in His Hands" around the family piano, with a camera pan fading over the Chicago skyline.

== Production ==
"The Mama Who Came to Dinner" serves as the pilot episode of the American sitcom Family Matters. Directed by Joel Zwick, the episode was filmed in front of a studio audience at Lorimar Studios in Culver City, California; the closing shot of the episode was taken from a helicopter in Chicago, where the series is set. The pilot also marks the only appearance of Valerie Jones as Judy Winslow, Carl's younger daughter, as she was replaced with Jaimee Foxworth in the following episode. Furthermore, the episode is one of five to include "What a Wonderful World" by Louis Armstrong as its theme song; this was later removed entirely from the episode during reruns and from the rest of the series with "As Days Go By" by Jesse Frederick, Bennett Salvay, and Scott Roeme.

== Reception ==
=== Viewership ===
In its initial broadcast, "The Mama Who Came to Dinner" was the thirty-eighth highest-rated television episode of the week from September 18 to September 24, 1989. With a household rating of 13.9, the ABC episode was watched by an estimated 21.9 million people.

=== Critical response ===
From The Baltimore Sun, television critic David Zurawik praised the episode for its pacing, writing, and its "unabashed celebration of old-time family values," along with Reginald VelJohnson's performance as Carl Winslow, which he said made Family Matters "work." On the other side of the spectrum, Nancy Morris from the Shreveport Journal said the show was "not funny," negatively compared it to its predecessor Perfect Strangers, and called it a rip-off of The Cosby Show.

Writing for the San Francisco Examiner, Michael Dougan criticized the series premiere for lacking "originality" and for not having much in common from the original source it derives from. Phil Kloer's review for The Atlanta Journal-Constitution told readers to watch the opening theme song of the episode and then turn their television off after the song concluded as he felt the show was something viewers had "seen a zillion times [...] not unwatchable awful, just the same-old-same-old."

Various critics also had similar responses to the episode. While Lane Crockett from The News-Press also compared it to The Cosby Show, The Evening Sun journalist Michael Hill lauded the show for its humor and themes, and said it was "one of those nice little comedies that deserves to be on the air." On his television column for the Akron Beacon Journal, Mark Dawidziak compared the episode to the CBS series Good Times, criticizing its writing and stating that "the talents of likeable performers are wasted with an efficiency fueled by a sweeping lack of wit and vision." Diane Holloway, a critic for the Austin American-Statesman, said that the premiere of Family Matters was a successful episode, comparing it positively to Happy Days, and praising its premise along with "the likeable Winslow family."
