= Shawn Harrison (actor) =

American actor (born 1973)

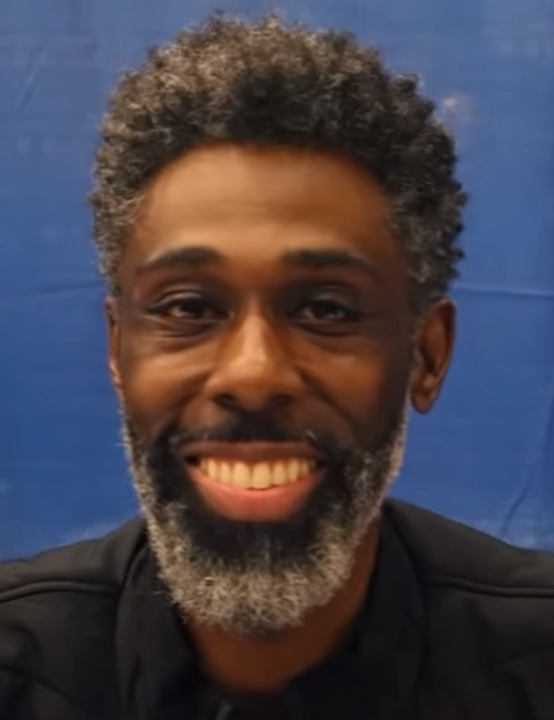
- Harrison at the 2019 Rhode Island Comic Con
- Born: December 28, 1973 (age 52); Los Angeles, California, U.S.
- Occupation: Actor
- Years active: 1985–present

Shawn Harrison (born December 28, 1973) is an American actor known for his role as Waldo Faldo, the dim-witted but lovable chef-in-training on the ABC sitcom Family Matters from 1990 to 1996.

== Biography ==
Harrison is best known for his role as Waldo Faldo in Family Matters. He has also made occasional appearances as the hairstylist Peaches on the UPN sitcom Girlfriends and guest appearances on other series, including Moesha.

Harrison voiced Timber Wolf and Ron-Karr in the animated series Legion of Super Heroes, which premiered in September 2006. He also guest starred in an episode of Punky Brewster, and played William K in The Ms. Pat Show.

== Filmography ==
=== Film ===
Year	Title	Role	Notes
2007	Lord Help Us	N/A	Direct-to-video; Associate producer
2009	The Old Man and the Seymour	Himself	Short film
2012	Silent But Deadly	Tyrone	
2018	Uncle Ed's Bucket List	Reverend Ike	

=== Television ===
Year	Title	Role	Notes
1985	Hill Street Blues	Kid	Episode: "What Are Friends For?"
1987	The Mighty Pawns	Tiny	Television film
1987	Daniel and the Towers	Sean	Television film
1988	Punky Brewster	Franco Grenolli	Episode: "Going to Camp"
1988–1989	Day by Day	J.D.	4 episodes
1990	L.A. Law	Andrew Steadman	Episode: "On Your Honor"
1990–1996	Family Matters	Waldo Geraldo Faldo	106 episodes
1991	The Royal Family	David Lemoan	Episode: "Talkin' Baseball"
1996	Moesha	Clark	Episode: "Ichi, Ni, San, Shi Look -- Clarkzilla!"
2004	Eve	Peaches	Episode: "Self Helpless"
2002–2004	Girlfriends	Peaches	5 episodes
2006–2008	Legion of Super Heroes	Timber Wolf, Ron-Karr (voice)	16 episodes
2020	Dynasty	Monsieur Reynaud	Episode: "My Hangover's Arrived"
2021–2022	The Ms. Pat Show	William K.	2 episodes
2021–2022	A Sitcom for Gio	N/A	Producer, director, and writer
2022	Raven's Home	Sir Leo	2 episodes

=== Video games ===
Year	Title	Role	Notes
2026	Grand Theft Auto VI	The Local Population	
