= Shaun Baker (actor) =

American actor

- Born: June 13, 1974 (age 52); New York City, New York, U.S.
- Occupation: Actor
- Years active: 1990–present

Shaun Baker is an American actor and martial artist. He is best known for his roles as Jamaican immigrant Russell Montego on the popular FOX sitcom Living Single and as Quick Williams on the syndicated television series V.I.P.

Baker had a minor role in the 1990 Kid 'n Play film House Party. In 1991, Baker appeared in In the Heat of the Night (the television series). His first major television role was Malcolm on the ABC sitcom Where I Live, co-starring with Doug E. Doug and Flex Alexander. After that series was cancelled, he landed the recurring role of womanizing Jamaican immigrant Russell Montego on the popular FOX sitcom Living Single. He also guest starred on the TV show Family Matters (as Harriet Winslow's cousin "Easy C" Clarence Baines), CSI: Miami, The District, NYPD Blue, Martin, and A Different World.

From 1998 to 2002, Baker portrayed boxer-turned-private investigator Quick Williams on Pamela Anderson's campy action series V.I.P. The show afforded Baker frequent opportunities to showcase his considerable martial arts skills. He holds a first-degree black belt in Shotokan karate.
