= Steve Urkel =

Fictional character on the sitcom Family Matters

- Family Matters character
- Jaleel White as Steve Urkel
- First appearance: "Rachel's First Date" (1989; only in syndicated episodes), "Laura's First Date" (1989; in first run episodes)
- Last appearance: "Urkel Saves Santa: The Movie!" (2023)
- Created by: Thomas L. Miller; Robert L. Boyett; William Bickley; Michael Warren
- Portrayed by: Jaleel White

In-universe information
- Full name: Steven Quincy Urkel
- Alias: Stefan Urquelle
- Nicknames: Urk Man; Jerkel (by various school bullies, including Jimmy); Urkie (by 3J); Uncle Steve (by Richie); Stevie or Stevie-kins (by Myra)
- Gender: Male
- Occupation: Student, inventor, scientist
- Family: Herb Urkel (father); Diane "Roberta" Urkel (mother)
- Relatives: Myrtle May Urkel (cousin) "Big Daddy" Urkel (uncle); Cecil Urkel (uncle); Cornelius Eugene "Original Gangsta Dawg" Urkel (cousin); Hirum Ross "H&R" Urkel (uncle); Julie Urkel (cousin); Oona Urkel (aunt); Omar Urkel (uncle); Ernie Urkel (uncle); Stefan Urquelle (clone, originally alter-ego); Muriel Urkel (aunt); Cleotus Urkel (cousin); Dirk Urkel (uncle); Richie Crawford (honorary nephew)

Steven Quincy Urkel is a fictional character on the American ABC/CBS sitcom Family Matters, portrayed by Jaleel White. Originally slated for a single appearance, he broke out to be the show's most popular character, gradually becoming one of its main protagonists. Due to the character's off-putting characteristics, a tendency to stir up events, and his role in the show's plotlines, he is considered a nuisance by the original protagonist's family, the Winslows. However, they come to accept him over time.

The character epitomizes a geek or nerd of the era, with large, thick eyeglasses, flood pants held up by suspenders, bad posture, multi-colored cardigan sweaters, saddle shoes, and a high-pitched voice. He professes love for his neighbor Laura Winslow. This love often leads to mishaps that trigger plot points and crises, and is unrequited until the series' end.

Throughout the series, Urkel is central to many of its running gags, primarily property damage and personal injury resulting from his inventions going awry or his clumsiness. The character became associated with catchphrases including "I've fallen and I can't get up!", "I don't have to take this. I'm going home.", "Did I do that?", "Whoa, Mama!", and "Look what you did!"

== Character development ==
Steve Urkel first appeared in the show's twelfth episode, "Laura's First Date", where he is introduced as a nerdy young boy who takes Laura Winslow out on a date. Despite him being madly in love with her, Laura finds Steve grating and doesn't return his affection. While initially intended to be a minor character, Urkel became very popular with audiences for his oddball antics, and became a recurring character. To naturally introduce the character to audiences upon repeated viewings, the creators added a scene with Steve to the show's fourth episode "Rachel's First Date", which became his first appearance in syndication. Steve joined the main cast beginning with the season-two premiere "Rachel's Place".

Family Matters co-creator Michael Warren named the character after his friend, writer and director Steve Erkel. Due to the show and the character's tremendous popularity during the early 1990s, Erkel encountered difficulties using his own name. He received many prank phone calls from "Laura" asking for "Steve", and businesses found his name to be suspicious. Warren stated that had he known the character would reappear for years, he would not have named him after his friend.

=== Portrayal ===
Steve Urkel embodies the stereotype of a socially inept intellectual who means well but often messes things up. Despite his intelligence, his actions often come across as clumsy and foolish. He is fiercely protective of and obsessed with Laura Winslow, and this admiration extends to the rest of the Winslow family. His attempts to help the Winslows often go awry. This puts him at odds with the family patriarch, Carl, who routinely throws Urkel out of his house.

Later episodes suggest that Steve's attachment to the Winslows stems from his bad relationship with his own family. Urkel often hints that most of his relatives, including his (never seen) parents, despise him and refuse to associate with him. This culminates in the two moving to Russia without him, and Urkel moving in with the Winslows. The show's plots reveal that Steve has at least four relatives who care about him. They are Uncle Ernie, Uncle Cecil (who, despite his gambling problems, visits the Urkel home to keep an eye on him), Aunt Oona from Altoona (played by singer Donna Summer), who is like a mother to him, and cousin Myrtle. In the series finale, Steve responds to Carl talking about how proud he is of his future son-in-law by saying "Thanks, Dad."

Urkel dresses unfashionably and is most commonly seen wearing suspenders, brightly colored shirts, and high-water pants. His hobbies include polka dancing and accordion playing. His motor vehicle of choice is a tiny European microcar, an Isetta. Unlike his friends, he is not interested in popular culture or sports, although he enjoys playing basketball and attempts to join the school team. This causes Myra to be attracted to Urkel but he shows little interest in her, mainly due to her stalker behavior.

While he is unpopular with his schoolmates, Urkel is a brilliant student and is on a first-name basis with his teachers. He is a genius inventor, and his fantastical but unreliable gadgets (including a transformation device and a time machine) are central to many Family Matters plots and gags, especially during later seasons.

Urkel sometimes breaks the law as a result of peer pressure. He is depicted learning the consequences when finding himself in situations outside of his control.

=== Stefan Urquelle ===
White as Steve's suave alter-ego Stefan Urquelle.

During the season five episode "Dr. Urkel and Mr. Cool", Urkel devises a plan to win Laura's heart. In a spoof of the original Nutty Professor film, he transforms his DNA using a serum, suppressing his "nerd genes" and bringing out his "cool genes". This creates the alter ego Stefan Urquelle, also played by Jaleel White in more stylish attire and a different facial expression. Initially, Laura is enamored with the smoother Stefan, but she asks that he turn back into Steve when Stefan's self-centeredness becomes apparent.

Steve improves the formula in the season five episode "Stefan Returns". He reduces its negative effects on his personality and invents a transformation chamber that allows him to become Stefan at will. He changes into Stefan several times – even while dating Myra – but circumstances force Steve to turn into his normal self again. With his narcissistic tendencies toned down, Laura falls deeply in love with Steve's alter-ego. A major factor in creating and extensively utilizing Stefan was the simple fact that doing the distinctive voice of Steve Urkel was starting to cause damage to Jaleel White's throat, so having him play a character who could speak in a normal voice gave him time to recover (White could still sound like Steve, but with less weight on that he was able to avoid any long-term issues).

In the seventh-season finale "Send in the Clones", Steve creates a cloning machine and winds up creating a perfect duplicate of himself. Myra is initially excited, but eventually realizes that two Steves are too much. Laura proposes that one of the Steves be permanently turned into Stefan, so that she and Myra can both be with the one they love. Stefan becomes a recurring character and eventually proposes to Laura in the ninth season. After weighing her choices in the episode "Pop Goes the Question", Laura chooses Steve over Stefan. Stefan leaves and does not appear again.

== Cultural impact ==
In 2010, Westside Middle School in Memphis, Tennessee, outlined its dress code policy on sagging pants, asking students to pull them up or get "Urkeled". Teachers would forcibly pull students' pants up and attach them to their waist using zip ties. Students would also have their photo taken and posted on a board in the hallway so that it would be visible to all their classmates. In an interview with NBC affiliate WMC-TV, Principal Bobby White stated that the general idea is to fight pop culture with pop culture. One teacher at the school claimed to have "Urkeled" up to 80 students per week, although after five weeks, the number dropped to 18.

=== Ratings effect ===
In syndication, Steve is incorporated into the teaser scene of "Rachel's First Date". His first appearance in the original broadcasts is in the 1989 episode "Laura's First Date". In the episode, Carl and Eddie separately set up dates for Laura for a dance or party. The first thing known about Steve is that he allegedly ate a mouse. He later makes reference to a mouse when speaking to Carl, implying that it might be true. Prior to Steve Urkel's introduction, the show was at risk of cancelation due to mediocre ratings. After Urkel was introduced, several scripts had to be hastily rewritten to accommodate the character, while several first-season episodes that had been completed had new opening gag sequences filmed featuring Steve trying to push open the Winslows' front door while the family holds it shut. The addition of Steve immediately helped the show boost its modest ratings. White was credited as a guest star in the first season and became a regular member of the cast in season two. In the opening credits for seasons six to nine, White was the only regular whose character's name appeared alongside his own during the opening credits. Season nine did not have the same credit sequence showing all the actors, it simply listed their names across the bottom of the screen, but White was listed "as Steve Urkel" there as well.

Jo Marie Payton, who played Harriette Winslow, admitted that she felt the Urkel character hogged much of the show's attention and disrupted the close family relationship she had formed with the rest of the cast. Payton took particular umbrage when Jaimee Foxworth, who played youngest sibling Judy Winslow, was dismissed to make more room for Urkel plotlines. Payton felt particularly close to Foxworth, who was the baby of the cast. Payton experienced increasing burnout over the course of the show because the production staff gave White free rein to misbehave. She felt that the focus on Urkel had made the show jump the shark. She almost quit when the show moved to CBS but agreed to stay for the first several episodes until the role of Harriette was recast. Payton was replaced by Judyann Elder. In an interview with Entertainment Tonight, Payton recalled an instance in which White insisted upon inserting something that would have violated Broadcast Standards and Practices, to the point that he and Payton nearly came to physical blows with each other. White is one of the few living members of the cast with whom Payton no longer speaks regularly. Still, she speaks well of her experiences, appreciating Urkel's impact on the show's popularity and the resulting residuals. Reginald VelJohnson, in a 2022 interview with Entertainment Tonight, acknowledged that White could be difficult to work with. He attributed the difficulties to White's young age and being surrounded by other teenagers, which VelJohnson (who himself never had children) found overwhelming. On the whole, VelJohnson had "nothing but good memories" of working with White.

=== The Urkel Dance ===
The Urkel Dance was a novelty dance that originated in the season two episode, "Life of the Party". It incorporated Urkel's hitched-up pants and nasal voice. The dance was popular enough to appear on another show, Step by Step, when the Steve Urkel character appeared in a crossover in the season one episode "The Dance".

Jaleel White also performed the song in character during the 5th Annual American Comedy Awards. Bea Arthur (from Maude & The Golden Girls) joined him on stage to "Do The Urkel", after which she said, "Hey, MC Hammer, try and touch that!"

A promotional cassette single of the song that accompanies the dance was produced and distributed in limited numbers. A T-shirt was also produced featuring lyrics and Urkel's likeness. Milton Bradley produced a 1991 board game, Do The Urkel!, based upon the dance.

Rick Sanchez pays homage to The Urkel Dance with "The Rick Dance" in the Rick and Morty episode "Ricksy Business".

=== Appearances on other shows ===
- Full House – In the 1991 episode, "Stephanie Gets Framed", Steve is called in to help Stephanie Tanner (Jodie Sweetin) deal with her anxieties after she has to get glasses. He was cousin to a friend of D.J. He also jams with Uncle Jesse and gives Michelle a penny for her piggy bank, telling her that "with prevailing interest rates, that penny will be worth three cents by the turn of the century". Incidentally, Family Matters did not air on the night of the episode's original airdate (January 25, 1991). It is implied that he found himself in San Francisco in the Full House universe before paying a visit to the Lambert household from Step by Step.
- Step by Step – In the series' second episode, "The Dance", Steve lands in the Lambert-Foster family's backyard after launching himself with a rocket pack from the living room of the Winslows' house in the Family Matters episode "Brain Over Brawn". The two scenes were shown in uninterrupted sequence, as Family Matters and Step by Step aired back to back on ABC's TGIF lineup. Urkel then helps his science-fair pen pal, Mark Foster (Christopher Castile), and lifts Alicia "Al" Lambert (Christine Lakin)'s spirits after her potential date dumps her just before a school dance. White reprises his "Do the Urkel" dance in the scene where Al gives the boy that dumped her his comeuppance. White also makes a brief two-second cameo as Steve in the 1997 episode "A Star Is Born", snapping a clapperboard on the set of the movie that Al was cast in over her two sisters.
- In the Family Matters episode "Beauty and the Beast", Steve sends a chain letter to his friend Cory Matthews, who lived in Philadelphia. The reference is to Ben Savage's character from Boy Meets World, but there were no on-screen crossovers. In an episode of Boy Meets World, Cory says he receives a chain letter from his friend Steve. (In the sequel series Girl Meets World, though Urkel never appears, an unnamed Carl Winslow-like police officer, portrayed by VelJohnson, does.)
- Fuller House - In the Season 3 finale, Urkel was mentioned by D.J.. In a January 2018 interview with TVLine's Andy Swift, series creator and former show runner Jeff Franklin mentioned that they have talked about White reprising the role and that they had some ideas for the character if White decides to reprise the role (Franklin was dismissed from the show before this materialized, and Urkel never appeared in the series).
- Scooby-Doo and Guess Who? - White reprised his role on the animated series Scooby-Doo and Guess Who? in the episode "When Urkel-Bots Go Bad!"
- Urkel Saves Santa: The Movie - White reprised his role in an original animated Christmas movie
- Urkel would play a lead role in a sketch mocking the increasingly ridiculous plots of the later seasons of Family Matters in the series Key & Peele (specifically in the season 4 episode "Slap-Ass: In Recovery"); in the sketch, Reginald VelJohnson and an ABC executive named only "Gene" are seen having an intense argument off-set over the outlandish plots and the obsessive reliance on Urkel; it is suddenly interrupted when Gene stopped mid-sentence, declared he was "nothing", then pulled out and loaded a handgun, further declared "the king is dead... long live the king", and shot himself in the head. Urkel, portrayed by Tyler James Williams, is then revealed to have forced Gene to shoot himself using telekinetic powers, and despite VelJohnson attempting to defend himself with Gene's gun (which fails as Gene had only loaded one bullet), uses such powers to force VelJohnson to point the gun at himself, only stopping him when he agrees to not complain and simply perform the sketches.

=== Merchandise ===
At the height of his popularity in 1991, several Urkel-branded products were released. They included a short-lived fruit-flavored cereal, Urkel-Os, and a Steve Urkel pull-string doll. A T-shirt line was created in 2002 but was discontinued shortly after its inception.

In 2021, White launched his own cannabis brand featuring a strain called "Purple Urkel". He reprised the Urkel role in a promotional skit with Snoop Dogg.

== Reception ==
In 1999, TV Guide ranked Urkel #27 on its list of the "50 Greatest TV Characters of All Time". In 2004, he was listed at #98 in Bravo's 100 Greatest TV Characters.
