= Arnold Johnson (actor) =

American actor (1921–2000)

- Born: Arnold Herbert Johnson; November 15, 1921; Brooklyn, New York, U.S.
- Died: April 10, 2000 (aged 78); Los Angeles, California, U.S.
- Occupation: Actor
- Years active: 1969–1996
- Spouse: Betty Heater Johnson
- Children: previous relationships, Ann, David, and Jamal Johnson (Farley). Step children, Christopher, Lisa, and Linda James

Arnold Herbert Johnson (November 15, 1921 – April 10, 2000) was an American actor who played the lead role in the film Putney Swope (1969). The film was directed by Robert Downey Sr. Johnson appeared in Shaft (1971) as Cul, a friend of John Shaft and the owner of a shoeshine parlor. He also had roles in Rocky (1976) and Menace II Society (1993), as Thomas, the religious Christian grandfather of the lead character Caine (played by Tyrin Turner).

Examples of his television work include recurring roles as George "Hutch" Hutton in Sanford and Son and as Fletcher, Mother Winslow's second husband, on the sitcom Family Matters. He guest-starred as Uncle Buddy in a Christmas episode of The Jeffersons, titled "George Finds a Father". He also guest-starred as Hubert Johnson on Good Times in the episode titled "A Place to Die".

Johnson died in Los Angeles, California at the age of 78.

== Filmography ==
- Putney Swope (1969) as Putney
- Shaft (1971) as Cul
- Pipe Dreams (1976) as Johnny Monday
- Rocky (1976) as Apollo's lawyer
- A Hero Ain't Nothin' but a Sandwich (1978) as Patient
- American Hot Wax (1978) as Arnold, Musician in Bar
- On the Nickel (1980)
- Honky Tonk Freeway (1981) as Bank Bum
- Chu Chu and the Philly Flash (1981) as Bum
- Racing with the Moon (1984) as Tattoo Artist
- Oh, God! You Devil (1984) as Preacher
- My Demon Lover (1987) as Fixer
- Weeds (1987) as Inmate
- The Seventh Sign (1988) as Janitor
- Sunset (1988) as George
- Piramiddo no Kanata ni: White Lion Densetsu (1989)
- Family Matters (1990-1995) as Fletcher Thomas
- The Five Heartbeats (1991) as Mr. Matthews
- Menace II Society (1993) as Thomas Lawson
