= Rosetta LeNoire =

American actress (1911–2002)

- Born: Rosetta Olive Burton; August 8, 1911; New York City, U.S.
- Died: March 17, 2002 (aged 90); Teaneck, New Jersey, U.S.
- Resting place: Cypress Hills National Cemetery
- Occupation: Actress
- Years active: 1939–1998
- Spouses: William LeNoire (m. 1929; div. 1943) Egbert Brown (m. 1948; died 1974)
- Children: 1
- Awards: National Medal of Arts (1999)

Rosetta LeNoire (born Rosetta Olive Burton; August 8, 1911 – March 17, 2002) was an American stage, film, and television actress. She was known to contemporary audiences for her work in television. She had regular roles on such series as Gimme a Break! (starting in S4E17 of the series) and Amen (in seasons 2 and 3); she is particularly known for her role as Estelle "Mother" Winslow on Family Matters, which aired from 1989 to 1998. In 1999, she was awarded the National Medal of Arts.

== Early life and career ==
LeNoire was born in Harlem, New York City, as the eldest of five children to Harold Burton, who was from Dominica, and Nymarie Edith Jacques Helwig, of Jamaica in the West Indies. As a young girl, LeNoire suffered from rickets, which her godfather Bill "Bojangles" Robinson helped her overcome by teaching her to dance. Stage theater was her first love, and LeNoire performed in the Federal Theatre Project production Bassa Moona and was cast as a witch in Orson Welles's 1936 production of Macbeth.

LeNoire appeared in a 1939 production of The Hot Mikado, starring Robinson, in which she played "Little Maid From School" Peep-Bo. She also appeared onstage, mostly as a singer and dancer, in I Had a Ball, Bassa Moona, Marching with Jimmy, Janie, Decision, Three's a Family, Destry Rides Again, and the Off Broadway Double Entry (two one-act musicals showcasing LeNoire: "The Bible Salesman", with a pre-SNL Garrett Morris, and "The Oldest Trick in the World" with Jane Connell).

== Amas Repertory Theater ==
LeNoire championed the cause of racial equity for more than 70 years. Her efforts profoundly influenced the New York theater community. In 1968, using her own savings, LeNoire founded the AMAS Repertory Theatre Company, an interracial theater dedicated to multi-ethnic productions in New York City.

With this company, LeNoire created an artistic community where members' individual skills were recognized without regard to race, creed, color, religion, or national origin. She became a successful and groundbreaking Broadway producer.

The Actors' Equity Association awarded her the first award for helping contribute to the diversification of theater casting; in 1988, the award was named the Rosetta LeNoire Award.

Amas Repertory Theatre provided a nurturing atmosphere for actors, and a community performing arts center. Throughout its history, many of the company's productions garnered reviews in The New York Times. The long-running theater's cramped headquarters were originally located at 1 East 104th Street, in the uptown neighborhood known as East Harlem. The theater continues today as Amas Musical Theatre, now located midtown on West 52nd Street above Jersey Boys, and carries on LeNoire's dream of diversity in the creative and theatrical arts. Since its inception, Amas has produced over 60 original musicals. Many of them have gone on to Broadway, including Bubbling Brown Sugar, which received a Tony Award nomination in 1976 for Best Musical.

== Voice acting ==
LeNoire was the voice of Big Bertha in Ralph Bakshi's animated feature film Fritz the Cat (1972).

== Death ==
On March 17, 2002, LeNoire died at Holy Name Hospital in Teaneck, New Jersey, of complications from diabetes, but an article in TV Guide reported that she died of pneumonia. A resident of the Lillian Booth Actors Home in Englewood, New Jersey, she was 90 years old at the time of her death. A Catholic, she was funeralized at St. Frances of Rome Catholic Church in the Bronx.

== Legacy ==
The Rosie Award, named for Rosetta LeNoire, "is given to individuals who demonstrate extraordinary accomplishment and dedication in the theatrical arts and to corporations that work to promote opportunity and diversity", with past honorees including Ossie Davis and Ruby Dee, Geoffrey Holder and Carmen de Lavallade, Leslie Uggams, Maurice Hines, Phylicia Rashad, Woodie King Jr., Dionne Warwick, and George C. Wolfe.

== Filmography ==
Film
Year	Title	Role	Notes
1958	Anna Lucasta	Stella	
1972	Fritz the Cat	Bertha, additional voices	Voice
1975	The Sunshine Boys	Odessa, Willy's nurse	
1983	Daniel	Prison Matron	
1984	Moscow on the Hudson	The Judge	
1984	The Brother From Another Planet	Mum	
1984	Lily in Love	Rosanna	
1985	Brewster's Millions	Judge R. Woods	
1986	Whatever It Takes	Millie	

Television
Year	Title	Role	Notes
1957	Studio One	Maid, Mary Ellen Bailey	2 episodes
1957	The Green Pastures	Noah's Wife	Television film
1960	The Play of the Week	Belle	2 episodes
1962	Armstrong Circle Theatre	Kathy	Episode: "Journey to Oblivion"
1964	The Nurses	Bessie	
1966	ABC Stage 67	Woman	Episode: "The Love Song of Barney Kempinski"
1970	A World Apart	Matilda	
1971	The Coming Asunder of Jimmy Bright		Television film
1971–1972	The Guiding Light	Leona Herbert	Episode: "Not with My Cousin You Don't"
1972	Another World	Gloria Metcalf	Unknown episodes
1973	Calucci's Department	Mizzi Gordon	Episode: "The $80 Heist"
1975	Guess Who's Coming to Dinner	Tillie	Television film
1976	Thank You, M'am	Mrs. Luella Bates Washington Jones	Short
1977	Ryan's Hope	Miriam George	6 episodes
1977	The Royal Family	Della	Television film
1978	Fantasy Island	Cool Shade, Darryl	Episode: "Family Reunion/Voodoo"
1980	Mandy's Grandmother	Librarian	Short
1980	Big Blonde	Nettie	Television film
1982	Benny's Place		Television film
1984	Great Performances	Rheba	Episode: "You Can't Take It with You"
1985	Tales from the Darkside	Miss Gillis	Episode: "Parlour Floor Front"
1985–1987	Gimme a Break!	Maybelle 'Mama' Harper	16 episodes
1987	The Father Clements Story	Mrs. Clements	Television film
1987–1989	Amen	Leola Forbes, Leola Hudson	8 episodes
1990	Maverick Square	Mrs. Lewis	Television film
1989–1997	Family Matters	Estelle 'Mother' Winslow	Main (seasons 1–7); recurring (seasons 8–9)
1998	Cosby	Nurse	Episode: "Playground Scar"
