= List of Mr. Stain characters =

This article lists the characters that appear in the Japanese CGI, Ga-Ra-Ku-Ta: Mr. Stain on Junk Alley (ガラクタ通りのステイン, Garakuta-dori no Sutein), containing fourteen volumes and created by Ryuji Masuda.

== Characters ==
Name	Description	Episode Appearance	Voice actor
Mr. Stain (ステイン Sutein)	A vagrant who sees the garbage, littering Junk Alley, as undiscovered treasure.	All.	Usui Takayasu
Palvan (パルバン Paruban)	A huge stray cat who wanders the back streets of Junk Alley.	All except Four and Ten.	Usui Takayasu
Pylon (パイロン Pairon)	A crab who uses a red pylon as his shell.	One, Six, Seven, Nine, Fourteen.	
Eaten (イートン Īton)	A cute and mysterious fish born from an abandoned egg.	One.	
Ghost Rings	The spirit of the dead Rings.	Two.	
Rings (指輪トカゲ Yubiwa Tokage)	A Lizard with a ravenous appetite who wears rings as necklaces.	Two, Three, Seven, Nine, Twelve.	
Kimono Beauty (着物美人)	A lady in a portrait, with whom Stain falls in love.	Three.	
Heavenly Birds (極楽鳥)	Rainbow-colored tropical birds.	Four.	
Radio Boy (ラジオボーイ Rajio Bōi); Radio Girl (ラジオガール Rajio Gāru)	Robots created from boomboxes.	Six.	
Magic Crayons	Crayons that magically make anything drawn with them real.	Five.	
Faceless Palvan	Palvan, after losing his face to an accident involving a picture of him drawn by Mr. Stain with the help of magical crayons .	Five.	Usui Takayasu
Lost Kitten #1 (子猫 Koneko)	A kitten found and cared for by Palvan.	Seven.	
Masked Monkey (フクロザル Fukurozaru)	A presumed monkey with a paper-bag over its head, which reveals only an eye.	Seven, Nine, Fourteen.	
Squeezed Dog (クビワイヌ Kubiwa Inu)	A dog that has overgrown the collar it wore as a pup.	Seven, Nine, Fourteen.	
Free Bird	A bird that Robot S1-T3 wants to be like.	Eight.	
Robot S1-T3 (ロボット S1－T3 Robotto S1－T3)	A remote controlled toy that can think for itself and wants to be free.	Eight, Fourteen.	
Lost Kitten #2 (子猫#2 Koneko #2)	A kitten that follows the Woolen glove around.	Nine.	
Woolen Glove (手袋)	A magical woolen mitten that comes alive and helps Stephany out of the Junk Alley.	Nine.	
Stephany (ステファニー Sutefanī)	A little girl who gets lost after wandering into Junk Alley.	Nine.	Natsuki Yamashita
Lomeria (ロメリア Romeria)	A mystical flower that grows from a seed Mr. Stain found.	Ten.	Erika Kawasaki
Mother Ship (宇宙船)	An alien spacecraft.	Ten.	
Clay Stain	The clay after taking over Palvan forms a live clay-imitation of Mr. Stain .	Eleven.	Usui Takayasu
Tiny (タイニー Tainī)	A fish that lives in the fountain in Junk Alley.	Twelve.	
Tiny's Daddy	A gigantic fish which is Tiny's father, and is eaten by Mr. Stain and Palvan.	Twelve.	
Policeman (警官)	An officer of the law who comes to Junk Alley on his rounds.	Thirteen.	
Baby (赤ちゃん Akachan)	An infant abandoned in Junk Alley.	Thirteen, Fourteen.	Tomoko Kaneda in episode fourteen
Handsome Stain	The alter ego of Mr. Stain.	Fourteen.	Usui Takayasu
Lifa (リファ Rifa)	A pianist who falls in love with Mr. Stain.	Fourteen.	Tomoko Kaneda
Beautiful Lifa	The alter ego of Lifa.	Fourteen.	Tomoko Kaneda
