= Funny Pets =

Japanese anime series

- Anime television series
- Directed by: Ryuji Masuda
- Produced by: Shunsuke Koga
- Original run: January 10, 2006 – December 25, 2006
- Episodes: 24

Funny Pets is a Japanese digital computer (CGI) anime series created and directed by Ryuji Masuda that was made in 2006.

The sound effects were made by Shizuo Kurahashi.

== Plot ==
A UFO carrying two aliens from another planet ends up falling into Earth, where they are saved by a moody air-headed showgirl called Funny. The two aliens, the moon-like Crescent (クレセント) and the sun-like Corona (コロナ), must adjust to life as Funny's pets. There are 24 episodes and two seasons in this series, all of which are available on YouTube and NicoNico Douga, a Japanese video sharing website.

== Characters ==
- Funny (ファニー)
- Corona (コロナ)
- Crescent (クレセント)
- Horley (ホーリーとその家族)

== OST (soundtrack) ==
The music is composed and mixed by Meyna Co, who also created the soundtrack for another of Masuda's shows called Ga-Ra-Ku-Ta: Mr. Stain On Junk Alley.

- Tracks:
1. Opening (lyrical)
2. Title 1
3. Candy
4. Crescent Blues
5. Funny
6. Title 2
7. Hunting
8. Idea
9. Arrows
10. Candy 2
11. Title 3
12. Candy 3
13. Crescent Blues 2
14. Cabbage
15. Title 4
16. Candy 4
17. Fear
18. Candy 5
19. Ghost
20. Spanked
21. Whale
22. Picture Book
23. Anger
24. Showdown
25. Walking The Rainbow
26. Driving To The Rainbow
27. Rainbow
28. Flight
29. Too High
30. Inflated
31. Ascension
32. Birthday (short version)
33. Crescent Blues
34. Birthday (long version)
35. Title 5
36. Three Matches
37. The Last Match
38. Orbit
39. Title 6
40. Out Of Frame
41. Canon
42. Title 7
43. Danger
44. Candy 6
45. Circle
46. Crescent Blues 4
47. Title 8
48. Love
49. Admiration
50. Guitar
51. Forced Dancing
52. Kiss
53. Heartbreak
54. Title 9
55. Guitar 2
56. The Favor Is Repaid
57. Guitar 3
58. Title 10
59. Frog's Song (vocals only)
60. Frog's Song (instrumental)
61. Frog's Song (complete)
62. Frog's Song (distorted)
63. Music Notes
64. Frog's Song (music notes)
65. Frog's Song (music notes) (complete)
66. Title 11
67. Cloud Pets
68. Evil And Just
69. Evil's Theme
70. Just's Theme
71. Candy 7
72. Title 12
73. At The Ocean
74. Hiding The Evidence
75. Title 13
76. Discovered
77. Grief
78. Goldfish
79. Dead Goldfish
80. Haunted
81. Book Thrower
82. Candy 8
83. Forbidden Game
84. Graveyard Dance
85. Title 14
86. Crescent Blues 5
87. Star's Song
88. Crescent War
89. Chocolate Fight (short version)
90. Chocolate Thieves
91. Chocolate Trance
92. Chocolate Fight (long version)
93. Candy 9
94. Back To The Home
95. Back To Funny
96. Candy 10
97. Opening (instrumental)

== See also ==
- Popee the Performer
- Ryuji Masuda
- Mr. Stain on Junk Alley
