= Takayasu Usui =

Japanese voice actor

- Born: August 25
- Occupation: voice actor

Takayasu Usui (うすいたかやす, Usui Takayasu; born on August 25) is a Japanese voice actor from Tokyo, Japan.

== Filmography ==
=== Television animation ===
- Star Ocean EX (2001) as Gyoro
- RahXephon (2002) as Underling B (Ep 19)
- Mr. Stain on Junk Alley (2003) as Mr. Stain (ep. 1-14); Palvan (ep. 1-3; 5-9; 11-14); Faceless Palvan (ep. 5); Clay Stain (ep. 11); Handsome Stain (ep. 14)

Unknown date

- Aquarian Age the Movie as Announcer
- Beyblade as Bill (ep 41)
- Boruto: Naruto Next Generations as Kokuri
- Burst Angel as RAPT Commander
- Captain Tsubasa as Mamoru Izawa (as an adolescent)
- Chrono Crusade as Carv
- Full Metal Panic! as Goddard; Savage A (ep 17)
- Gakuen Utopia Manabi Straight! as Shimojima
- Getbackers as thief (ep 38)
- Gravion as Lab Scientist
- Kamichu! as English Teacher (DVD ep 15); Kaineshi/Dog Rider (DVD ep 5, 6, 16); Oyadama-Kaze/Boss Wind (DVD ep 1); Referee (DVD ep 8); Sendou-Chagama/Boatman Teapot (DVD ep 2, 7)
- Kiddy Grade as Bols; Broadcaster; Father; Information officer
- Legend of Himiko as haniwa soldier
- Les Misérables - Shoujo Cosette as Grocer (ep 1)
- Magical Project S (eps 1–2, 10-11, 20, 22-23)
- Munto 2: Beyond the Walls of Time as First Lieutenant
- Ninja Scroll as Kikori
- R.O.D the TV as Newscaster (ep. 17); Toastmaster (ep. 10)
- Sakura Diaries as Coach
- Space Pirate Mito as Nandabu
- Tenchi in Tokyo
- Tenchi Universe as Pirate B (ep 10)
- Transformers: Cybertron as Inch-Up; Signal Lancer; Sonic Bomber
- You're Under Arrest as Bomb Squad [group] (ep 30); Crook (ep 10, 13); Customer (ep 19); Fisher (ep 38); Imamura (ep 20); Keihin Tohoku Line Driver (ep 37); Male Officer; Middle-Aged Man (ep 25); Reporter (ep 24); Tower Employee A (ep 34–35); Tsuyama (ep 12); Uemura (ep 21); Waiter (ep 22); Wolfman (ep 40)

=== Original video animation (OVA) ===
- Yukikaze (2002)

=== Theatrical animation ===
- Spriggan (1998)

=== Drama CDs ===
- Aisaresugite Kodoku series 2: Itoshisugita Shifuku (Tanaka)
- Analyst no Yuutsu series 3: Yuuwaku no Target Price (Shinjirou Tsujitani)
- Bad Boys! (Torayasu Hodate)
