= Gary Dehan =

British voice actor (born 1962)

- Born: November 26, 1962 (age 63); Windsor, Berkshire, England
- Other names: Gary Lipowitz
- Occupations: Voice actor CEO of Vyond
- Years active: 1989–present

Gary Dehan (born November 26, 1962) is a British voice actor and the current CEO of Vyond. He had a small role in the English version of Sonic the Hedgehog: The Movie, dubbing the voice of the character Hyper Metal Sonic.

== Filmography ==
- Sonic the Hedgehog (OVA) - Metal Sonic (credited as "Hyper Metal Sonic")
- Sakura Diaries - Additional Voices
- Variable Geo - Washio
- Queen Emeraldas - Communications Officer
- Ninja Resurrection - Musashi's Lookout, Sajuro Date
- City Hunter: The Motion Picture - Professor Muto, Cop, Soldier
- Sakura Wars - Demon, Limo Driver
- Tekken: The Motion Picture - Thug 3
- Metal Angel Marie - John, Additional Voices
- Legend of Crystania - Captain Of The Sacred World, Garudi's Messenger, Sumash
- Adventures of Kotetsu - Punk DKMY
- Ninja Resurrection 2: Hell's Spawn - Godayu Toda
- 801 T.T.S. Airbats - Dream radio operator/Male cadet
- Maps - Distressed Caller
- Black Lion: Fear the Black Lion - Nobunaga
- City Hunter: Bay City Wars - Additional Voices
- City Hunter: Million Dollar Conspiracy - Additional Voices Commando, Civilian
- City Hunter: .357 Magnum - Commando, Civilian
- Shuten Doji: The Star Hand Kid 1 - Ketsumei Dolt

== Miscellaneous Crew ==
- Sakura Wars - (Dubbing director: English)
- Black Lion: Fear The Black Lion (ADR director/ADR script)

== Producer ==
- Black Lion: Fear the Black Lion

== Other jobs ==
- CEO of Vyond (currently as of 2018)
