= Total Blackout =

- Created by: Henrik Nielsen
- Written by: Robert Campanga
- Directed by: Per Zachariassen
- Presented by: Jaleel White
- Music by: George Hinde; Eric Hester
- Country of origin: United States
- No. of seasons: 2
- No. of episodes: 24

Production
- Executive producers: Henrik Nielsen; Jeff Apploff (Season 1); Scott St. John (Season 2)
- Producers: Tom Ruff; Felicia Aaron White
- Cinematography: Matthew W. Davis
- Editors: Curtis Pierce; Folmer Wiesinger; Sean Fawcett; Stacie Dekker; Victor Gonzaga; Andrew Yuncken; Noah Musser
- Production company: Fremantle

Original release
- Network: Syfy
- Release: April 25, 2012 – July 9, 2013

Total Blackout is an American game show that aired on Syfy that features contestants that have to complete challenges such as: identifying things with either their hands, nose, or mouth; gathering items; or getting from point A to Point B while being totally in the dark. The host of the show is Jaleel White, known for roles like Steve Urkel on the ABC/CBS sitcom Family Matters, and Sonic the Hedgehog in three animated shows. Each episode has four players competing to win $5,000. On occasion, episodes will feature four teams of two. The player or team who either takes the longest to do a certain task or identifies the fewest items in the allowed time is eliminated at the end of each round. The show was renewed for a second season by SyFy that started on October 30, 2012. Season 1 and 2 are now available on iTunes.

The show is originally Danish and first aired in Denmark (created by Henrik Nielsen) on Kanal 5 in 2011, where Uffe Holm was host of the show. The show was later adapted to a U.S.version.

== Series overview ==
Season	Episodes	Originally released	
Season	Episodes	First released	Last released
1	8	April 25, 2012	June 13, 2012
2	16	October 30, 2012	July 9, 2013

== Episodes ==
=== Season 1 (2012) ===
No. overall	No. in season	Title	Original release date
1	1	"Entering The Darkness"	April 25, 2012
2	2	"2 Heads Are Blinder Than 1"	April 25, 2012
3	3	"Touch, Sniff & Transfer"	May 2, 2012
4	4	"Good With Your Hands, Good With Your Nose"	May 9, 2012
5	5	"Lick, Limbo, Lather And Repeat"	May 16, 2012
6	6	"Buddy System"	May 23, 2012
7	7	"Fear Is Served"	June 6, 2012
8	8	"Jump Around"	June 13, 2012

=== Season 2 (2013) ===
No. overall	No. in season	Title	Original release date
9	1	"Don't Burst Your Bubble Helmet"	October 30, 2012
10	2	"Creatures Of Darkness"	November 6, 2012
11	3	"Glazed And Confused"	November 13, 2012
12	4	"Three Blind Mice"	November 20, 2012
13	5	"Broken Glass & Hot Coals"	January 15, 2013
14	6	"Tub Of Terror"	January 22, 2013
15	7	"Sibling Scare"	January 29, 2013
16	8	"Heavy Petting Zoo"	February 5, 2013
17	9	"Love Is Blind"	February 12, 2013
18	10	"All-Star Blackout"	February 19, 2013
19	11	"Parental Blackout"	February 26, 2013
20	12	"All Bark, No Bite"	March 5, 2013
21	13	"Lick It Before You Pick It"	March 12, 2013
22	14	"Cold Feet"	July 7, 2013
23	15	"Count 'em, Lick 'em, Face 'em"	July 8, 2013
24	16	"Celebrity Blackout"	July 9, 2013

== International versions ==
Country	Local title	Channel(s)	Host(s)	First aired
Armenia	Ultramut	Shant TV	???	November 27, 2011 – January 3, 2013
Belgium (Wallonia)	Total Blackout	RTL-TVI	Jean-Michel Zecca	December 19, 2011 – ??
Brazil	Apagão	Rede Bandeirantes	Bola & Bolinha	2015
Cyprus	Total Blackout	Omega	Charis Aristeidou	September 1, 2021 – January 13, 2022
Denmark(original format)	Total Blackout	Kanal 5	Uffe Holm	February 28, 2011 –??
France	Total Blackout	W9	Alex Goude	October 25, 2014 – 29 August 2015
Germany	Total Blackout – Stars im Dunkeln	RTL	Daniel Hartwich	August 18, 2012 –??
Greece	Blackout	ANT1	Nadia Boule	October 31, 2011 – May 2012
Greece	Total Blackout	Alpha TV	Anastasios Rammos	March 5, – July 10, 2022
Indonesia	Total Blackout Indonesia	ANTV	Choky Sitohang Ivan Gunawan	May 10, 2011 – ??
Mongolia	Түнэр харанхуй	Edutainment TV	Uchral Yanjin	May 9, 2021
Netherlands	Total Blackout	Veronica TV	Tim Haars	March 22, 2011 –??
Norway	Total Blackout	TVNorge	Synnøve Skarbø	March 9, – June 1, 2011
Russia	В чёрной-чёрной комнате	Channel One	Igor Jijikine	January 21, – March 17, 2012
Russia	Полный блэкаут	STS	Sergey Svetlakov	September 13, 2020 – November 28, 2023
Sweden	Total Blackout	Kanal 5	Hans Wiklund	April 4, – June 27, 2011
Ukraine	Володар темряви	2+2	Hryhoriy Herman	April 4, – May 30, 2011
