= Jaleel White =

American actor (born 1976)

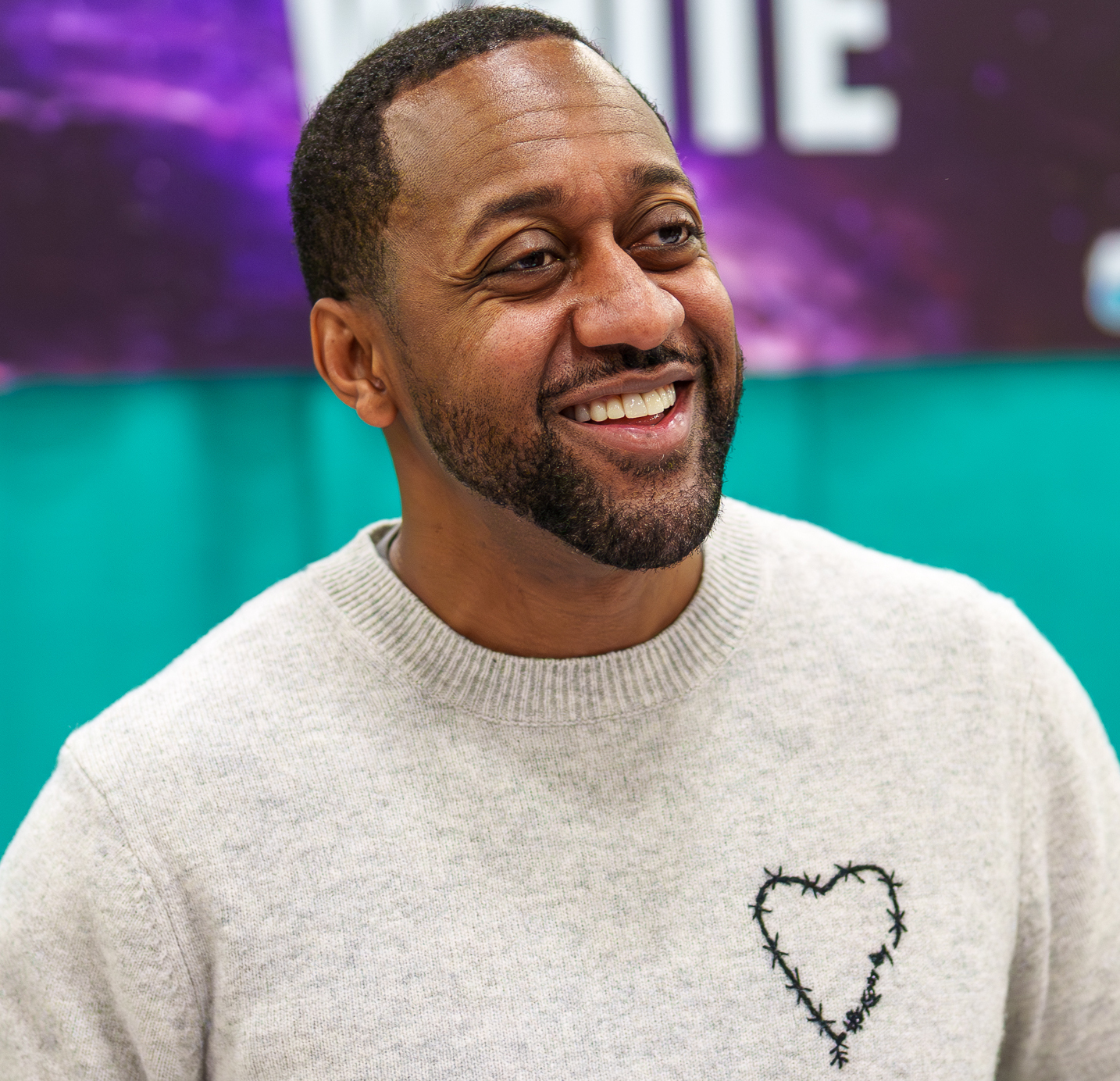
- White in 2025
- Born: Jaleel Ahmad White; November 27, 1976 (age 49); Culver City, California, U.S.
- Education: University of California, Los Angeles (BA)
- Occupation: Actor
- Years active: 1984–present
- Spouse: Nicoletta Ruhl (m. 2024)
- Children: 1
- Website: www.jaleelwhite.com

Jaleel Ahmad White (born November 27, 1976) is an American actor. He first portrayed Robert Richmond on the short-lived sitcom Charlie & Co. (1985–1986) before rising into prominence for his role as Steve Urkel, and then his cousin Myrtle Urkel, and also his alter-ego role as Stefan Urquelle on the sitcom Family Matters (1989–1998), where he was originally intended to make one appearance. White eventually became the protagonist of the show.

White was the first American actor to voice the Sega video game character Sonic the Hedgehog, doing so in the animated series Adventures of Sonic the Hedgehog, Sonic the Hedgehog (also known as Sonic SatAM) and Sonic Underground. After Family Matters ended, White starred in the short-lived UPN comedy series Grown Ups (1999–2000) and even had the leading role as Michael in the 2006 comedy film Who Made the Potatoe Salad?; thus having a supporting role as Detective Hamer in the two films including The Wrong Woman (2013) and Mommy, I Didn't Do It (2016); and as well as James Black in the film The Preacher's Son (2017) and its 2018 sequel The Choir Director. White also reprised his role as Steve Urkel in the animated film Urkel Saves Santa: The Movie (2023). He also had guest roles in dozens of television sitcoms including a repossessor in Meego and as well as Officer Adams in Bones.

== Early life ==
White was born in Culver City, California, the only child of Michael White, a dentist, and Gail White, who was a homemaker. His mother later became his manager. White attended John Marshall Fundamental High School in Pasadena, California, and South Pasadena High School, and later graduating from UCLA in 2001. On the advice of his preschool teacher, White began acting as a child. He got his start on TV commercials at age three. One of White's notable commercial appearances was for Jell-O pudding pops alongside Bill Cosby.

== Career ==
White's first television role was a guest stint on The Jeffersons, in 1984. He later auditioned for the role of Rudy Huxtable on The Cosby Show. According to White, he was cast in the role (the character was originally intended to be male) but was replaced by Keshia Knight Pulliam when Bill Cosby decided to mirror his television family after his real life family. The following year, he was cast as the son of Flip Wilson and Gladys Knight on the CBS sitcom Charlie and Company. The series was intended to be CBS' answer to the highly rated Cosby Show which debuted on NBC in 1984. Unlike The Cosby Show, Charlie and Company did not catch on with audiences and was canceled in May 1986. In 1987, he appeared in the pilot episode for Good Morning, Miss Bliss, and had a guest role on Mr. Belvedere. In 1988, White had a supporting role in Cadets, a sitcom starring Soleil Moon Frye. The pilot episode aired during a preview special on September 25, 1988, on ABC. The series, however, was not picked up by the network. Also during the 1980s, he appeared in a few segments of NBC's One to Grow On.

White had a role in the NBC television film Camp Cucamonga. The film features an ensemble cast including Sherman Hemsley, Jennifer Aniston, and Brian Robbins. Several other child actors of the era including Chad Allen, Candace Cameron, Danica McKellar, Josh Saviano, and Breckin Meyer also appear.

=== Family Matters ===
At the age of 12, White originated his most famous role, Steve Urkel, on Family Matters (1989–1998). The role was initially conceived as a one-time guest appearance, but the character proved to be popular, and after spending season 1 as a guest star, White joined the main cast in season 2. He also played two other members of the Urkel family, including his alter ego Stefan Urquelle and Myrtle Urkel. During the height of Family Matters' popularity, the character of Urkel was marketed with breakfast cereal (Urkel-Os) and an Urkel doll. In addition to starring in the series, White also wrote several episodes, including one, at age 19, that was the series' highest rated for that year. The series was a staple of ABC's TGIF lineup and became one of the longest-running sitcoms with a predominantly Black cast in television history.

In 1992, he was featured in The Jaleel White Special, in which he played a fictionalized version of himself making a film, while also playing Steve Urkel.

By the time the series ended in 1998, White, who was then 21 years old, was disillusioned with the role, and had been shaken by the death of his close friend and co-star Michelle Thomas from an aggressive form of stomach cancer. Shortly after the series' cancellation, he stated in a 1999 interview, "If you ever see me do that character again, take me out and put a bullet in my head and put me out of my misery." White was so tightly defined by his Urkel character that he encountered difficulty finding other roles.

In later years, White came to terms with the character. In a 2011 interview with Vanity Fair, he addressed the 1999 "bullet" quote stating, "It's one of those things that it's very unfortunate how quotes are taken out of context. I remember that interview very vividly. I loved playing those characters ... But the fact is that I was maturing. ... To be honest, I was retarding my own growth as a man to maintain the authenticity to what I thought that character should be." When asked if he would ever reprise the Steve Urkel role, White said, "I'll always say never say never; I'm a pretty creative person. I can't envision how I could do it in a way that would be irreverent and fun for both me and the viewing audience".

=== Other career highlights ===
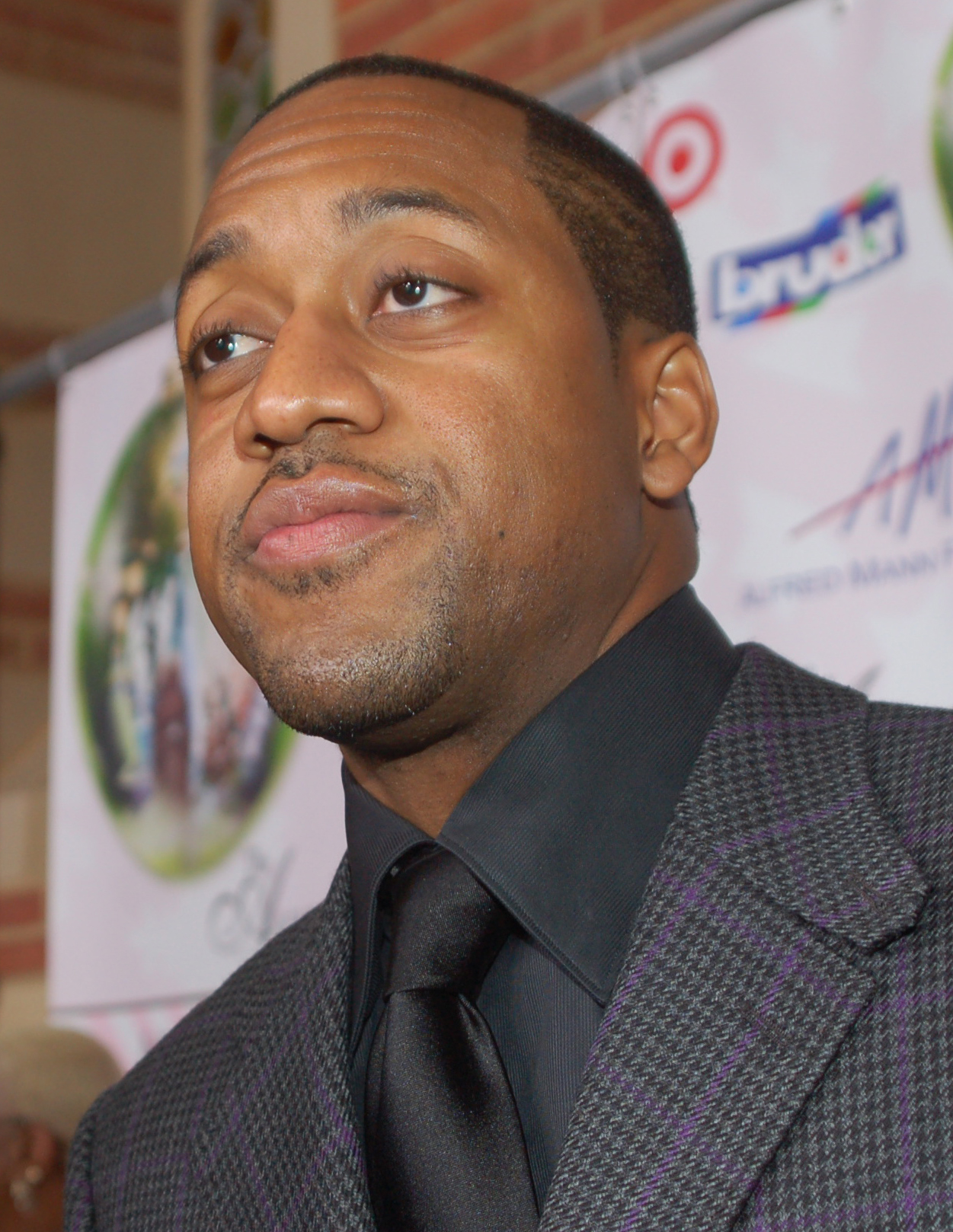
White in December 2010

White was the original English-language voice of the popular video game character Sonic the Hedgehog, having been cast in 1993 (pre-dating Martin Burke and Ryan Drummond). He voiced the character in all of the DiC-produced animated series: Adventures of Sonic the Hedgehog, Sonic SatAM, and Sonic Underground, as well as the Christmas special, Sonic Christmas Blast. In Underground, White also voiced Sonic's brother and sister, Manic and Sonia.

In 1999, White returned to television in the UPN sitcom Grown Ups. The series was based around White as a young man striking out into adulthood. He also co-produced and wrote some episodes for the show, in which he starred as "J", a college graduate struggling to establish his role in life as an adult. The pilot episode featured another former child actor, Soleil Moon Frye, known for her role as Punky Brewster, as the girl whom he chose as a roommate. The show received poor reviews from critics but debuted in second place in the ratings upon its premiere. However, ratings soon dropped and UPN canceled the series after one season.

White's acting roles have not been restricted to sitcoms. He has provided his voice to several animated projects including Warner Bros.' 1998 film Quest for Camelot. In 1999, he provided the voice for a teenaged Martin Luther King Jr., in Our Friend, Martin.

In 2001, White graduated from UCLA with a degree in film and television. He has continued acting and has had small parts in the films Big Fat Liar (in a cameo role) and Dreamgirls, and was featured as the lead role in the direct-to-DVD comedy Who Made the Potatoe Salad? in 2006. In 2007, he guest-starred on the CW series The Game, followed by a role as a law school graduate interviewing for a job at Crane, Poole and Schmidt in the ABC legal drama Boston Legal.

In June 2009, White began appearing in the web series Road to the Altar. In the series, White stars as Simon, a 30-something Black man marrying a young Jewish girl named Rochelle. In September 2009, White guest starred on the USA Network series Psych, as an estranged college singing buddy of the character Gus.

In June 2010, White starred in the web series Fake It Till You Make It. He also serves as writer and producer of the series. The series, which premiered on Hulu, follows the exploits of former child star Reggie Cullen (White) turned image consultant and his three protégés as they hustle to navigate Hollywood. In March 2011, White guest starred on the TBS sitcom Are We There Yet?, which reunited him with fellow Family Matters cast member Telma Hopkins. Later that same year, White appeared as the star in Cee-Lo Green's music video for his song "Cry Baby".

In October 2011, White appeared in the season 8 premiere of House, titled "Twenty Vicodin", where he appears as a well-connected inmate, occasionally helping Hugh Laurie's character Gregory House to sneak contraband into the prison. In April 2012, White began hosting the Syfy game show Total Blackout.

In March 2012, White began competing on the 14th season of Dancing with the Stars. He was partnered with two-time dance champion Kym Johnson. In the opening night's performance, White and Johnson danced the Foxtrot to "The Way You Look Tonight". They earned a total of 26 points out of 30. White was voted off the series in May 2012.

In 2015, White appeared in a Scion commercial.

In 2017, it was announced that CBS picked up his single camera comedy series Me, Myself & I with Bobby Moynihan, that premiered in September 2017. After six episodes, it was pulled from the fall schedule, leaving seven episodes unaired, with the network airing the remaining episodes in the summer.

White began hosting the game show Flip Side in 2024. The program was a success, drawing over a million viewers in daytime syndication, and was renewed for a second season in 2025.

White became the host of the HGTV series Totally 90s House which premiered in August 2026.

== Personal life ==
White is a Christian. He dated actress Christine Lakin from fellow TGIF show Step by Step in the early 1990s. White has one daughter, with his ex-girlfriend Bridget Hardy. On May 4, 2024, White married Nicoletta Ruhl, a sports technology business executive, in a ceremony in Los Angeles.

White is a big fan of basketball and frequently played pickup games with George Clooney, who was filming ER in the studio next door.

White is also a fan of the Edmonton Oilers of the National Hockey League.

In 2021, White announced the launch of his line of cannabis products featuring the Purple Urkle strain, set for debut on April 20 at California dispensaries.

White released a memoir in November 2024, in which he reflects on his career and life after playing the Urkel character.

White has a memorial set up in his home for his Family Matters co-star Michelle Thomas, who died in 1998 of stomach cancer, shortly after the series had wrapped up.

== Filmography ==
=== Film ===
Year	Title	Role	Notes
1998	Quest for Camelot	Bladebeak	Voice
1999	Our Friend, Martin	Young Martin Luther King Jr.	Voice, direct-to-video
2006	Miracle Dogs Too	Leo	Direct-to-video
2006	Puff, Puff, Pass	Tenant No. 2	
2006	Who Made the Potatoe Salad?	Michael	
2006	Dreamgirls	Talent Booker	Cameo
2008	Kissing Cousins	Antwone	
2008	Green Flash	Jason Bootie	Direct-to-video; Alternative title: Beach Kings
2009	Call of the Wild	Dr. Spencer	
2009	Road to the Altar	Simon Fox	
2010	Mega Shark Versus Crocosaurus	Dr. McCormick	Direct-to-DVD
2011	Judy Moody and the Not Bummer Summer	Mr. Todd	
2012	Rhymes with Banana	J	
2013	Sonic	Sonic the Hedgehog	Voice, fan film
2013	The Wrong Woman	Detective Hamer	
2013	Parking Lot Pimpin'	—N/a	Writer
2014	Dumbbells	The Leader	
2014	Santa Con	Paul Greenberg	
2016	Mommy, I Didn't Do It	Detective Hamer	
2017	The Preacher's Son	James Back	
2018	The 15:17 to Paris	Garrett Walden	
2019	5th of July	Orlando	
2022	North of the 10	Lyle Silvers	
2022	The Greatest Inheritance	Mr. Shepard	
2022	Hustle	Blake	
2022	Dumbbells Special Edition	Cult Leader	
2023	Urkel Saves Santa: The Movie	Steve Urkel, Urkel Bot, Stefan Urquelle	Voice; direct-to-video; also producer

=== Television ===
Year	Title	Role	Notes
1984	The Jeffersons	Van Van Morris	Episode: "Ebony and Ivory" - 11x02
1984	Silence of the Heart	Hanry	TV movie
1985–86	Charlie & Co.	Robert Richmond	Main cast
1986	The Disney Sunday Movie	Jake	Episode: "The Leftovers"
1987	Mr. Belvedere	Ernie Masters	Episode: "Jobless"
1987	Good Morning, Miss Bliss	Bobby Wilson	Episode: Pilot
1987	Jay Leno's Comedy Hour	Kid Eating Cake No. 5	TV special
1988	Cadets	Cadet Nicholls	Unsold Pilot Episode
1989–98	Family Matters	Steve Urkel, Stefan Urquelle, Myrtle Urkel	Main cast Writer - 2 episodes
1991	Full House	Steve Urkel	Episode: "Stephanie Gets Framed"
1991	Step by Step	Steve Urkel	Episode: "The Dance"
1992	The Jaleel White Special	Himself, Steve Urkel	TV special
1993	Adventures of Sonic the Hedgehog	Sonic the Hedgehog, Masonic the Hedgehog, Mummified Hedgehog	Voice, main cast
1993–94	Sonic the Hedgehog	Sonic the Hedgehog	Voice, main cast
1995	The Fresh Prince of Bel-Air	Derek	Episode: "Not with My Cousin You Don't"
1996	Sonic's Christmas Blast	Sonic the Hedgehog	Voice; TV special
1997	Meego	Repossessor, Guy blowing a whistle	2 episodes
1997	Diagnosis: Murder	Himself	Episode: "Must Kill TV"
1999	Sonic Underground	Sonic the Hedgehog, Sonia the Hedgehog, Manic the Hedgehog, Aman-Rapi	Voice, main cast
1999–00	Grown Ups	J. Calvin Frazier	Main cast Producer
2000	Happily Ever After: Fairy Tales for Every Child	Boy Who Cried Wolf	Voice, episode: "Aesop's Fables: A Whodunit Musical"
2002	Inspector Gadget's Last Case	Gadgetmobile	TV movie
2005	Half & Half	Hershel	Episode: "The Big State of the Reunion Episode"
2007	The Game	Chris	Episode: "The Big Chill"
2007	Boston Legal	Kevin Givens	Episode: "Guise 'n Dolls"
2009, 2012	Psych	Tony	2 episodes
2010	Fake It Till You Make It	Reggie Culkin	Main cast; also executive producer and writer
2011	The Problem Solverz	K-999	Voice, 2 episodes
2011	Are We There Yet?	Ray Savage	Episode: "The Nick Gets Jealous Episode"
2011	House	Porter	Episode: "Twenty Vicodin"
2011	Love That Girl!	Director	Episode: "Director's Cut"
2012	NCIS	Martin Thomas	Episode: "A Desperate Man"
2012–13	Total Blackout	Host	Main Host
2013	Regular Show	Cool Shade, Darryl	Voice, episode: "TGI Tuesday"
2013	Drop Dead Diva	Bob, Game Show Host	Episode: "Guess Who's Coming?"
2014	CSI: Crime Scene Investigation	Kenny Greene	Episode: "Keep Calm & Carry On"
2014	Celebrities Undercover	Himself	Episode: "Joey Fatone & Jaleel White"
2014–18	Drunk History	Various	3 episodes
2015	Hell's Kitchen	Himself	Episode: "11 Chefs Compete"
2015	Hawaii Five-0	Nolan Fremont	Episode: "Ho'amoano"
2015	Castle	Mickey Franks	Episode: "Dead from New York"
2016	The Edge and Christian Show That Totally Reeks of Awesomeness	Himself	Episode: "The 90's"
2016	Celebrity Family Feud	Himself	Season 2, Episode 7
2016	Atlanta	Himself	Episode: "Nobody Beats the Biebs"
2016	Survivor's Remorse	Derek	Episode: "The Photoshoot"
2017	Bones	Officer Adams	Episode: "The Tutor in the Tussle"
2017–18	Me, Myself & I	Darryl	Main cast
2018	Trial & Error	Atticus Ditto Jr.	Recurring cast: Season 2
2018, 2020	Fresh Off the Boat	Calvin	2 episodes
2019	Scooby-Doo and Guess Who?	Steve Urkel, Urkel Bot	Voice, episode: "When Urkel-Bots Go Bad!"
2019	Historical Roasts	Nelson Mandela, Muhammad Ali	2 episodes
2019–20	Raven's Home	Chris Springlakes	3 episodes
2020	The Big Show Show	Terence "Terry" Malick III	5 episodes
2020	Teen Titans Go!	Miner	Voice, episode: "The Night Begins to Shine - Chapter One: Mission to Find the Lost Stems"
2020	Ever After with Jaleel White	Himself, Host	Producer
2020–21	DuckTales	Gene the Genie	Voice, 3 episodes
2021	Family Reunion	Eric	1 episode
2023	American Dad!	Edgar Queefinski	Voice, episode: "Cow I Met Your Moo-ther"
2023	The Eric Andre Show	Himself	Episode: "Jaleel Blanco"
2023	The Ms. Pat Show	Max Jefferson	2 episodes
2023	The Afterparty	Himself	Episode: "Vivian and Zoë"
2024	Star Wars: Skeleton Crew	Gunter	Recurring cast
2024–present	Flip Side	Himself (host)	Game Show

=== Web ===
Year	Title	Role	Notes
2012	SuperFuckers	Percy, Omnizod	Voice, 12 episodes

== Awards and nominations ==
Year	Award	Category	Title of work	Result
1985	Young Artist Award	Best Young Actor – Guest in a Television Series	The Jeffersons	Nominated
1986	Young Artist Award	Best Young Supporting Actor in a New Television Series	Charlie & Co.	Nominated
1991	Young Artist Award	Outstanding Young Comedian in a Television Series	Family Matters	Won
1994	NAACP Image Awards	Outstanding Youth Actor/Actress	Family Matters	Won
1995	NAACP Image Awards	Outstanding Youth Actor/Actress	Family Matters	Won
1996	Nickelodeon Kids' Choice Awards	Favorite Television Actor	Family Matters	Nominated
1996	NAACP Image Awards	Outstanding Lead Actor in a Comedy Series	Family Matters	Nominated
1997	NAACP Image Awards	Outstanding Lead Actor in a Comedy Series	Family Matters	Won

== See also ==
- List of celebrities who own cannabis businesses
