= A Desperate Man =

- NCIS episode
- Episode no.: Season 9 Episode 13
- Directed by: Leslie Libman
- Written by: Nicole Mirante-Matthews
- Original air date: January 10, 2012

Guest appearances
- Brian Dietzen as Jimmy Palmer; Enrique Murciano as CIA Agent Ray Cruz; Louis Ferreira as Metro Detective Nick Burris; Michael Beach as Metro Detective Robert Flowers; Mark Hutter as U.S. Ambassador James Ealy; Jaleel White as Martin Thomas; Ion Overman as Jane Thomas; Joanna Canton as Sandy Milton; Lisaun Whittingham as Lt. Commander Maya Burris (uncredited)

Episode chronology
| ← Previous "Housekeeping" | Next → "Life Before His Eyes" |
- NCIS season 9

"A Desperate Man" is the 13th episode of the ninth season of the American crime drama television series NCIS, and the 199th episode overall. It originally aired on CBS in the United States on January 10, 2012. The episode is written by Nicole Mirante-Matthews and directed by Leslie Libman, and was seen by 21.03 million viewers.

== Plot ==
NCIS investigates the death of Navy lieutenant Maya Burris, whose body was found at a studio apartment. However their investigation is hindered by her husband Detective Nick Burris, who tries to take over the case then breaks into the crime scene to solve it himself. After Ray stands her up at dinner the previous night, Ziva begins to think about her future with him, and has a life-changing decision to make when Ray apologises by asking her to marry him.

The case takes a complex turn when they learn that Maya Burris worked in Pakistan and had recently confronted Barry Norton, a recently fired co-worker (revealed to have leaked classified intel to terrorists) for using her I.D. to access files. However, when Norton turns up dead in an orchestrated car crash in D.C. the following night, they begin to question if the lieutenant was just collateral damage.

After finding Ray's phone number in the victims phone logs, Ziva confronts him when she realises he stood her up to kill Norton. Ray reveals that he was supposed to assassinate Norton in Pakistan but he botched the op and Norton escaped, and rather than let him escape Ray tracked him to D.C. and made 2 attempts to kill him: the first attempt he accidentally killed Lieutenant Burris, the second when he tampered with the car. Ziva realizes she no longer feels she can trust him, and dumps him. Gibbs informs her that the C.I.A. confirmed that by killing Norton on American soil, Ray violated orders and will be fired and imprisoned.

== Production ==
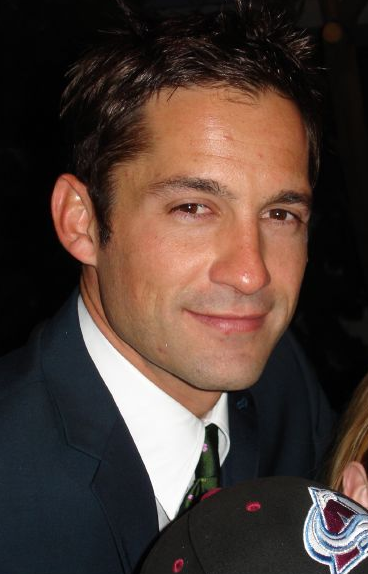
Enrique Murciano guest starred as Ziva's boyfriend Ray Cruz.

"A Desperate Man" is written by Nicole Mirante-Matthews and directed by Leslie Libman. According to executive producer Gary Glasberg, "Ziva has been going through some decisions and choices, just as Tony has. With this week’s episode, Ray is going to return, and she’s going to have to face some decisions of her own and figure out exactly what’s going on with that relationship. This was an opportunity to tease that and bring it all up to the surface".

Ziva's relationship with Ray Cruz was last seen in the episode "Pyramid" back in season 8. "[Ray] is coming off of a long assignment, and there are professional things going on with him, and personal things going on with him, and it’s all going to get dealt with and come to a head in this episode". As for Tony, "[he] wants Ziva to be happy. "He’s protective of her and cares about her and has feelings for her, and, at the end of the day, wants to make sure that she’s safe and happy with the direction of her life. There’s some protective nature that goes along with that, and I think some of that is what you were picking up on [at the end of the last episode]".

Brian Dietzen (as Jimmy Palmer) and Enrique Murciano (as Ray Cruz) are recurring in this episode.

== Reception ==
"A Desperate Man" was seen by 21.03 million live viewers following its broadcast on January 10, 2012, with a 12.6/19 share among all households, and 4.1/11 share among adults aged 18 to 49. A rating point represents one percent of the total number of television sets in American households, and a share means the percentage of television sets in use tuned to the program. In total viewers, "A Desperate Man" easily won NCIS and CBS the night, while the spin-off NCIS: Los Angeles drew second and was seen by 16.60 million viewers. Compared to last week's episode "Housekeeping", "A Desperate Man" was up a bit in viewers. This episode ended up being the most watched of season 9.

Steve Marsi from TV Fanatic gave the episode 4.5 (out of 5) and stated that it was "another solid episode overall. I'd like to see the team members involved in more steady relationships — either with each other or outsiders — that don't involve murderers, but no complaints".
