= Sonic the Hedgehog: The Movie =

1996–1999 original video animation

- 1999 North American VHS cover

ソニックザヘッジホッグ (Sonikku za Hejjihoggu)
- Created by: Sega Enterprises
- Original video animation
- Directed by: Kazunori Ikegami
- Produced by: Kōichirō Sugie (ep. 1); Akinori Ōno (ep. 2); Takayuki Sugisaki; Naoji Hōnokidani
- Written by: Mayori Sekijima; Masashi Kubota
- Music by: Mitsuhiro Tada
- Studio: Studio Pierrot
- Licensed by: AUS: Madman Entertainment; US: ADV Films
- Released: January 26, 1996 – March 22, 1996
- Runtime: 27–28 minutes (individual OVAs); 54 minutes (English dubbed version)
- Episodes: 2

Sonic the Hedgehog (ソニックザヘッジホッグ, Sonikku za Hejjihoggu) or Sonic the Hedgehog: The Movie is a 1996 Japanese two-part original video animation (OVA) based on the Sonic the Hedgehog video games by Sega. It was produced by Studio Pierrot and directed by Kazunori Ikegami. It features Sonic, Tails, Knuckles, Dr. Eggman (Dr. Robotnik in the English release), Metal Sonic, and supporting characters created for the OVA.

The first episode was released in Japan on January 26, 1996, and the second on March 22. The series was licensed and dubbed in English by ADV Films, who released it as a direct-to-video film on September 7, 1999, to coincide with the international release of the game Sonic Adventure (1998). It received positive reviews from critics.

== Plot ==
=== Part 1 ===
Sonic the Hedgehog relaxes on the beach of South Island with Miles "Tails" Prower when Old Man Owl arrives with a message from the President asking Sonic to come to his office. Once there, they discover Dr. Ivo Robotnik has taken the President and his daughter Sara prisoner. After giving an exposition of how Planet Freedom works—explaining the two "dimensions" of the planet, The Land of the Sky, and The Land of Darkness—Robotnik explains that a giant mecha that he created named Metal Robotnik (Note: "Black Eggman" in the original Japanese release) has turned against and exiled him from his city of Robotropolis (Note: "Eggmanland" in the original) and sabotaged the Robot Generator, which will explode by sunrise the next day. Robotnik asks Sonic to head to the Land of Darkness to stop it in exchange for the President and Sara's lives.

Upon arrival in the Land of Darkness, Sonic and Tails find themselves in a deserted city known as the 'Ancient Relics'. There they are confronted by Metal Robotnik, who tries to stop them from reaching the generator. Knuckles the Echidna arrives and rescues them, and all three team up to destroy the mecha. Unbeknownst to them, Metal Robotnik was a non-sentient robot controlled by Robotnik. A furious Robotnik emerges from Metal Robotnik's wreckage; proclaiming that once Sonic arrives in Robotropolis, he shall encounter something far more evil than Metal Robotnik.

=== Part 2 ===
After entering Robotropolis, Knuckles distracts the Badniks on patrol while Sonic and Tails try to stop the generator in the heart of the city. The machine traps Sonic and scans his body. Knuckles frees Sonic just as the machine crumbles to the ground, revealing Dr. Robotnik's newest robot, Hyper Metal Sonic. Dr. Robotnik and Sara appear in Metal Robotnik's remains, and Robotnik reveals that he lured Sonic to copy his mind, personality, and abilities for Hyper Metal Sonic. Sonic and Metal battle, but Metal easily overpowers Sonic. Metal then attacks several cities before heading off to the ice caps. Tails and Knuckles return to the Land of the Sky, where they learn that Metal is out to destroy the Land of the Sky by digging into the ice caps that hold it together, allowing lava to emerge and melt the ice. Sonic wakes up in Green Lake City and returns to the Presidential Palace, learning of Metal's goal from the others.

Sonic, Tails, and Knuckles go to the ice caps, where Sara is being held hostage by Robotnik; he plans to marry her against her will so that the two can rule over Planet Freedom after the Land of the Sky's decimation. Sonic encounters Metal and the two have a lengthy battle. Tails corrupts Metal's data, and Sonic severely damages him. During the altercation, the President and Old Man arrive and are trapped in their aircraft, but Metal saves them. Sonic realizes that Metal does have emotions, as he was programmed with Sonic's persona and instincts. Metal gets blown into a crack and falls into a subglacial volcano. Sonic reaches out his hand to help him, but Metal rejects it, telling him "there is only one Sonic" before being destroyed by the rising magma.

Later, Sonic and the others reflect on the recent events while Sara and Tails do their best to console Sonic, who is left deeply saddened by Metal Sonic's death. Robotnik returns in his flying machine; stating that he still has Sonic's DNA and can build a new Metal Sonic, one that does not contain Sonic's good personality, but one of his missiles from the fight inadvertently blows up the disc containing Sonic's DNA. Knuckles then hits Sonic as revenge for him accidentally stepping on him during the brawl, and the two get into a chase, with all the others following behind.

== Voice cast ==
Cast
Role	Japanese	English
Sonic the Hedgehog	Masami Kikuchi	Martin Burke
Miles "Tails" Prower	Hekiru Shiina	Lainie Frasier
Knuckles the Echidna	Yasunori Matsumoto	Bill Wise
Dr. Ivo "Eggman" Robotnik	Junpei Takiguchi	Edwin Neal
Hyper Metal Sonic	Masami Kikuchi	Gary Dehan
Sara	Mika Kanai	Sascha Biesi
President	Yuzuru Fujimoto	Edwin Neal
Old Man Owl	Chafuurin	Charles Campbell
Butler	Akimitsu Takase	uncredited

== Production and release ==
The OVA series was produced by Studio Pierrot, Sega Enterprises and General Entertainment under the supervision of Sonic Team, Yuji Naka and Naoto Ohshima. It is directed and storyboarded by Kazutaka Ikegami, with Mayori Sekijima handling the story structure, Masashi Kubota writing the scripts, Tsuneo Ninomiya designing the characters and Mitsuhiro Tada composing the music. Both episodes feature the ending theme "Look-alike," composed and arranged by Tada and written and sung by Riyu Konaka. The OVA was distributed by Taki Corporation in Japan on a rental-only basis between January 26 and March 22 before a retail release on May 31, 1996.

ADV Films announced they had licensed the OVA series at Project A-Kon 9, which took place in May 1998. It was dubbed in English and released as a single direct-to-video film under the name of Sonic the Hedgehog: The Movie on VHS and DVD on September 7, 1999, to coincide with the international release of Sonic Adventure for the Dreamcast. In Australia and the United States, the OVA was released on both VHS and DVD, with the DVD version including both English and Japanese language tracks together with English and Spanish subtitles. The OVA also received home releases in the United Kingdom.

In Taiwan, the OVA was broadcast on the Shouhua Cartoon Channel in its original language with Mandarin subtitles, while in Hong Kong the OVA was dubbed into Cantonese and shown on TVB Jade. The OVA also received a Korean dub in South Korea under the name Sonic Vs. Metal Sonic that was released on VHS in 1997. The OVA was later released on DVD in South Korea in 2002, but the DVD release did not include the Korean dub and instead featured the original Japanese version and English dub with Korean, English and Spanish subtitles.

Discotek Media attempted to license the show for a Blu-ray release in North America. However, Sega was unable to locate key documents related to the OVA's music or voice actors.

== Reception ==
In the United States, the OVA reached number 7 on the Billboard video sales chart and number 6 on the Billboard kids' video sales chart. The March 1996 issue of the DieHard Magazine gave the OVA a positive review and praised the animation, adding "the characters on-screen presence is what really makes Sonic so cool. It's like playing the game, but in anime form. After the U.S. Sonic cartoon has been canceled, this anime is definitely a good choice."

Devon Lord-Moncrief of Comic Book Resources described the OVA as a “a must-see for Sonic fans” adding “Whether they love it or find it awkwardly painful, it’s still a fun and memorable experience.” Henry Gilbert of GamesRadar+ approved of the concept of a colorful, fast-paced anime Sonic, noting the fights between Sonic and his evil counterpart, Metal Sonic, as "cool". This is unfortunately accompanied by "scenes of slapstick humor, anime cliches, and childish voice acting" as well as the "perpetually annoying" Sara. Chris Shepard of Anime News Network praised the OVA for its non-traditional action and said it was "good for Sonic fans". He called the English dub poor, and said the story "strayed from the video games a little too much" and it was "very basic". John Sinnott of DVD Talk said "it didn't really pull me in at any time".

Dj Sol of Comic Book Resources gave the OVA a positive review, describing it as being “highly faithful to the games while bringing in its own intriguing, unique elements to its story.” Sebastian Sommer of High on Films also praised the OVA, commenting highly on the animation, music and storyline while describing it as "an absolute masterpiece of classic animation style and a great expression of Sega's blue hedgehog that will never lose speed."

== Legacy ==
The OVA was developed as a pilot for a Sonic anime series which would have materialized had it been more successful. In 2008, "Look-alike" was included as a track on a Sonic music album released that year entitled “True Colors: The Best of Sonic the Hedgehog Part 2.” In 2020, an extended version of "Look-alike" was discovered, together with several tracks that were not used in the OVA. The 101st issue of Archie Comics' Sonic the Hedgehog comic book series featured a reference to the OVA in a story that included alternate versions of Sara, Robotnik, Metal Robotnik, Knuckles, Sonic, and Tails based on their OVA depictions, with Knuckles wearing his hat from the OVA. Other storylines in the Archie Comics series set in an alternate future continuity also made references to the OVA, with Knuckles shown to be wearing the same hat as his OVA counterpart.

A trailer of the OVA was included as a bonus on the 1997 compilation Sonic Jam for the Sega Saturn. The 2024 Knuckles miniseries has Knuckles wearing the hat that he dons in the OVA. IDW Publishing's Sonic the Hedgehog comic book series also contained many references to the OVA; in its Scrapnik Island miniseries, the character Mecha Knuckles from the 2001 game Sonic Advance returns with a new beaten up design wearing a tattered version of Knuckles' OVA attire. In the final fight against Mecha Sonic in the miniseries, there are many homages to the film, including a scene mirroring the final interaction between Sonic and Metal Sonic in the OVA.

== See also ==
- Sonic X
