= Sonic the Hedgehog (character) =

Video game character

- Sonic the Hedgehog character
- Classic (left) and Modern (right) Sonic designs
- First game: Rad Mobile (1990) (cameo); Sonic the Hedgehog (1991) (full appearance)
- Created by: Yuji Naka; Naoto Ohshima
- Designed by: Naoto Ohshima; Yuji Uekawa (Note: Created Sonic's modern design, first seen in Sonic Adventure (1998).)
- Voiced by: Japanese: Takeshi Kusao (1991–1993); Toshio Furukawa (commercials); Masato Nishimura (Sonic CD); Masami Kikuchi (1996 OVA); Jun'ichi Kanemaru (1998–present); Tomokazu Seki (Sonic Unleashed; "Werehog" form); Taishi Nakagawa (live action franchise); Masahide Terashima (Young Sonic, 2020 film); English: Jaleel White (DIC cartoons); Meg Inglima (Sonic's Schoolhouse); Paula Arundell (Sonic Live in Sydney); Martin Burke (1996 OVA); Ryan Drummond (1998–2004); Sam Vincent (Sonic Underground; singing voice); Jason Griffith (2003–2010); Roger Craig Smith (2010–present); Ben Schwartz (live action franchise); Benjamin L. Valic (Young Sonic, 2020 film); Deven Mack (Sonic Prime)

In-universe information
- Aliases: The Blue Blur; The Fastest Thing Alive
- Species: Hedgehog
- Gender: Male

Sonic the Hedgehog (Note: Japanese: ソニック・ザ・ヘッジホッグ, Hepburn: Sonikku za Hejjihoggu) is a title character created by the Japanese game designers Yuji Naka and Naoto Ohshima. He is the protagonist of the Sonic the Hedgehog franchise and the mascot of the Japanese video game company Sega. Sonic is an anthropomorphic blue hedgehog who runs at supersonic speed. He races through levels, collecting rings and avoiding obstacles, as he seeks to defeat his archenemy, Doctor Eggman. He is accompanied by supporting characters, such as his sidekick Miles "Tails" Prower, admirer Amy Rose, and rival Knuckles the Echidna.

Sonic made a cameo in the arcade game Rad Mobile (1990) before officially debuting in Sonic the Hedgehog, a platform game for the Sega Genesis, in 1991. Sega sought a mascot to compete with Nintendo's Mario, and Ohshima designed Sonic based on a prototype programmed by Naka. Sonic's design was influenced by a variety of sources, including Felix the Cat, Mickey Mouse, Michael Jackson, and Santa Claus; his pigmentation was chosen to match Sega's cobalt blue logo. Yuji Uekawa redesigned Sonic for Sonic Adventure (1998) to suit the franchise's transition to 3D computer graphics, with a more mature look designed to appeal to older players.

Sonic media characterizes Sonic as an impatient, snarky drifter and daredevil who despises injustice. He frequently battles Eggman, a mad scientist who seeks to steal the mystical Chaos Emeralds and take over the world. Sonic can curl into a ball to attack enemies and use the Chaos Emeralds to become Super Sonic, a power-up transformation granting him greater speed and strength. He has appeared in over 100 video games, in addition to guest appearances in other Sega franchises and in crossover games such as Nintendo's Super Smash Bros. series. Jun'ichi Kanemaru voices Sonic in Japan, while his English voice has been provided by Ryan Drummond, Jason Griffith, and Roger Craig Smith.

Sonic is one of the most famous video game characters and an established pop culture icon. Journalists regard him as one of the greatest video game characters and his popularity inspired many imitators. His likeness has been featured in merchandise and Sega sponsorships. The Sonic series is one of the bestselling game franchises and was key to Sega's success during the 16-bit era in the 1990s. Sonic has been adapted in comics, animations, and films, including a live-action film franchise distributed by Paramount Pictures in which he is voiced by Ben Schwartz.

== History ==
The initial sketches of Sonic by Naoto Ohshima, under the moniker "Mr. Hedgehog"

While Sega was seeking a flagship series to compete with Nintendo's Mario series, several character designs were submitted by its research and development department. Many results came forth from their experiments with character design, including an armadillo, a dog, a Theodore Roosevelt look-alike in pajamas (who would later be the basis of Doctor Eggman's design), and a rabbit (who would use its extendable ears to collect objects, an aspect later incorporated in Ristar). Naoto Ohshima took some of these internal designs with him on a trip to New York City and sought feedback by asking random passersby at Central Park their opinions; of the designs, the spiky teal hedgehog, initially codenamed "Mr. Hedgehog" (Mr.ハリネズミ, Mr. Harinezumi), (Note: "Mr. Hedgehog" is commonly, but inaccurately, translated literally as "Mr. Needlemouse".) led this informal poll, followed by Eggman and the dog character. Ohshima felt that people selected it because it "transcends race and gender and things like that". On return to Japan, Ohshima pitched this to the department, and the hedgehog was ultimately selected as the new mascot.

The detailed design of Sonic was aimed to be something that could be easily drawn by children and be familiar, as well as exhibit a "cool" attitude, representative of the United States at the time. Sonic's blue pigmentation was chosen to match Sega's cobalt blue logo, and his shoes evolved from a design inspired by both Santa Claus and Michael Jackson's boots with the addition of the color red, which was inspired by the contrast of those colors on Jackson's 1987 album Bad; his personality was based on then-Governor of Arkansas and later President of the United States Bill Clinton's "Get it done" attitude. To help sell the idea to Sega's higher-ups, Ohshima pitched the concept framed by a fictional fighter pilot that had earned the name "Hedgehog" due to his spiky hair, and had decorated his plane with images of Sonic. When this pilot retired, he married a children's book author, who wrote stories about the Sonic character, the first which became the plot for the first Sonic game; Ohshima stated that this influence can be seen in the logo of the game, which features Sonic in a pilot's wing emblem.

The origins of Sonic can be traced farther back to a draft created by Naoto Ōshima in 1989, which years later turned into Sonic. Yuji Naka implemented the idea of a character running inside loops with an algorithm that allowed a sprite to move smoothly on a curve by determining its position with a dot matrix. This concept was subsequently fleshed out by designer Hirokazu Yasuhara.

Sonic was created without the ability to swim because of a mistaken assumption by Yuji Naka that all hedgehogs could not do so. A group of fifteen people started working on the first Sonic the Hedgehog game, and renamed themselves Sonic Team. The game's soundtrack was composed by Masato Nakamura of the band Dreams Come True. Sega sponsored the group's "Wonder 3" tour, painting Sonic on the tour bus, distributing pamphlets advertising the game, and having footage of the game broadcast above stage prior to its release. The original concepts gave Sonic fangs and put him in a band with a human girlfriend named Madonna. However, a team from Sega of America, led by Madeline Schroeder, who calls herself "Sonic's mother", "softened" the character up for an American audience by removing those elements. This sparked a heated issue with Sonic Team. Naka later admitted that it was probably for the best.

Sonic's appearance varies greatly depending on the medium and the style in which he is drawn. In the video games, Sonic's original design by Ohshima was short and round, with short quills, a round body, and no visible irises. Artwork featuring this design and drawn by Akira Watanabe was displayed on the package artwork for Sonic the Hedgehog. Sonic's proportions would change for the release of Sonic the Hedgehog 2 on the Mega Drive; Sonic's head to height ratio was changed from 1:2 to 1:2.5. For the 1998 release of Sonic Adventure, Sonic was redesigned by Yuji Uekawa as a character with longer legs and a less spherical body, longer and more drooping quills, and green-colored irises. For the 2006 game, Sonic was redesigned to make him look adult-like and taller to appeal to the next generation players. This was also done because Sonic would interact with humans more often and his design was supposed to fit. An alternative "Werehog" form was introduced in Sonic Unleashed, placing more emphasis on Sonic's melee skills rather than speed. Although Tetsu Katano acknowledged the large negative fan response to the Werehog, he believes it could return in a future game.

Bob Raffei, CEO of Sonic Boom developer Big Red Button, stated that Sonic Boom's Sonic is "very different... both in tone and art direction." That version has blue-furred arms, more quills, and wears a brown neckerchief around his neck and athletic sports tape on his wrists and shoes.

=== Voice portrayal ===
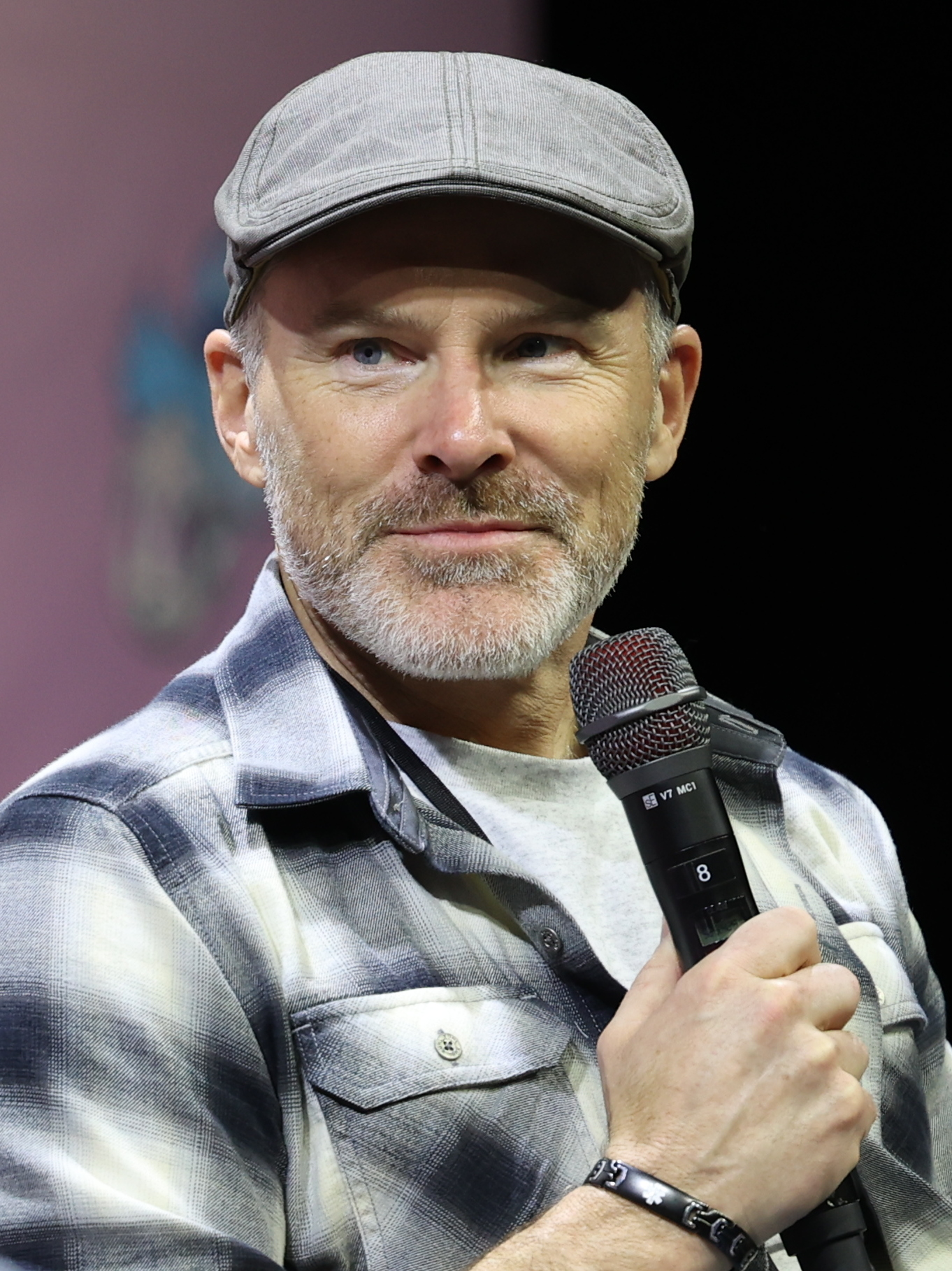
Roger Craig Smith (pictured in 2025) has been the voice actor for the character in most English language media since 2010.

Sonic originally had a few voice samples in Sonic CD, with designer Masato Nishimura providing the voice. Sonic's first true voice actor was Takeshi Kusao for the arcade game SegaSonic the Hedgehog, with Junichi Kanemaru continually voicing the role beginning with the release of Sonic Adventure. Kanemaru also voices Sonic in Sonic X, Sonic Boom, and the Japanese dub of the Wreck-It Ralph films. In Sonic Unleashed, Sonic was voiced by Tomokazu Seki while in Werehog form.

The first English portrayal of Sonic was by Jaleel White in the DiC animated series Adventures of Sonic the Hedgehog, Sonic SatAM, and Sonic Underground. Sam Vincent provided his singing voice in the latter DiC cartoon. Starting with Sonic Adventure, Sonic was voiced in English by Ryan Drummond. Drummond was replaced by Jason Griffith starting from Sonic X, with Griffith voicing Sonic within the games starting with Shadow The Hedgehog in 2005. Griffith was replaced by Roger Craig Smith, starting with Sonic Free Riders and Sonic Colors. Smith announced on his Twitter account on January 29, 2021, that he would no longer voice Sonic, with his departure confirmed by Sega the same day. On May 26, 2021, Smith and Sega confirmed that he was voicing Sonic once again. Ben Schwartz voiced Sonic in the 2020 feature film and its 2022 and 2024 sequels. Canadian actor Deven Mack, voices Sonic in the Sonic Prime animated series.

== Appearances ==
=== Video games ===
Sonic in his "Super Sonic" form. Art by Yuji Uekawa.

Sonic's first shown appearance in a video game was in the 1990 arcade racing game Rad Mobile, as a decorative ornament hanging from a rearview mirror. This was followed by an unlicensed appearance in The Adventures of Quik & Silva as a villain. Sonic's first playable appearance was in the platform game Sonic the Hedgehog for the Sega Mega Drive/Genesis, which also introduced his nemesis Dr. Robotnik. His two-tailed fox friend Tails joined him in the game's 1992 sequel, Sonic the Hedgehog 2. When all the Chaos Emeralds have been collected, Sonic can transform into Super Sonic by collecting 50 rings. Super Sonic is nearly invincible, runs faster, and jumps farther, but loses one ring per second and reverts to normal when his rings are depleted. Sonic CD, released in 1993, introduced Sonic's self-appointed girlfriend Amy Rose and recurring robotic doppelgänger Metal Sonic as Sonic traveled through time to ensure a good future for the world. Sonic 3 and its direct sequel Sonic & Knuckles, both released in 1994, saw Sonic and Tails battle Robotnik again, with the additional threat of Knuckles, who is tricked by Robotnik into thinking Sonic is a threat. Sonic 4 (2010–2012) continues where the story of Sonic 3 left off, reducing Sonic to the only playable character and releasing in episodic installments. The second episode sees the return of both Tails as Sonic's sidekick and Metal Sonic as a recurring enemy.

Other two-dimensional platformers starring Sonic include Sonic Chaos (1993), Sonic Triple Trouble (1994), Sonic Blast (1996), Sonic the Hedgehog Pocket Adventure (1999), Sonic Advance (2001), Sonic Advance 2 (2002), Sonic Advance 3 (2004), Sonic Rush (2005), Sonic Rush Adventure (2007), Sonic Colors (2010), and Sonic Generations (2011), all in which were released for handheld consoles.

Sonic Adventure (1998) was Sonic Team's return to the character for a major game. It featured Sonic returning from vacation to find the city of Station Square under attack by a new foe named Chaos, under the control of Dr. Robotnik (now known as Dr. Eggman). It was also the first Sonic game to feature a complete voice-over. Sonic Adventure 2 (2001) placed Sonic on-the-run from the military (G.U.N.) after being mistaken for Shadow the Hedgehog. Sonic Heroes (2003) featured Sonic teaming up with Tails and Knuckles, along with other character teams like Team Rose and Chaotix, against the newly rebuilt Metal Sonic, who had betrayed his master with intentions of world domination. Sonic the Hedgehog (2006) features Sonic in the city of water, "Soleanna", where he must rescue Princess Elise from Dr. Eggman while trying to avoid a new threat to his own life, Silver the Hedgehog. He is the only playable character in Sonic Unleashed (2008), in which he unwillingly gains a new personality, "Sonic the Werehog", the result of Sonic being fused with Dark Gaia's power. He gains strength and flexibility in exchange for his speed, and new friends including a strange creature named Chip who helps him along the way. In Sonic Colors (2010), Eggman tries to harness the energy of alien beings known as "Wisps" for a mind-control beam. Sonic Generations (2011) features two playable incarnations of Sonic: the younger "classic" Sonic, whose gameplay is presented in a style reminiscent of the Mega Drive/Genesis games, and present-day "modern" Sonic, who uses the gameplay style present in Unleashed and Colors, going through stages from past games to save their friends. Sonic Generations features various theme songs including modern and retro versions that are able to be selected from throughout Sonic's twenty-year history. In April 2013, Sega announced that Sonic Lost World would launch in October 2013 for the Wii U and Nintendo 3DS.

Sonic and the Secret Rings (2007) features Sonic in the storybook world of One Thousand and One Nights. A sequel, Sonic and the Black Knight (2009), continued the storybook theme, this time taking place within the realm of the Arthurian legend.

Sonic has also been featured in other games of many genres other than 2D and 3D platform games. These include Sonic Spinball, Sonic Labyrinth (1995), the racing games Sonic Drift (1994), Sonic Drift 2 (1995), Sonic R (1996), Sonic Riders (2006), Sonic Rivals (2006), Sonic Rivals 2 (2007), Sonic Riders: Zero Gravity (2008), and Sonic Free Riders (2010), the fighting games Sonic the Fighters (1996) and Sonic Battle (2003), the mobile game Sonic Jump (2005), and the role-playing video game Sonic Chronicles: The Dark Brotherhood (2008). Critics and fans have occasionally questioned why Sonic uses vehicles in several of the racing games, given his latent speed; however, it has been explained by Sega and in some official Sonic media that he does so in order to compete fairly with others in races.

Video games such as Dr. Robotnik's Mean Bean Machine (1993), Knuckles' Chaotix (1995), Tails' Skypatrol (1995), Tails Adventure (1995), and Shadow the Hedgehog (2005) starred supporting characters of the Sonic series, although Sonic himself cameos in most of them.

==== Cameos and crossovers ====
Sonic makes cameos in various other games, such as Billy Hatcher and the Giant Egg as a power-up, in the main hallway in Phantasy Star Universe, and in the 2008 remake of Samba de Amigo. He is also a playable character in Christmas NiGHTS into Dreams. Nintendo, Sega's former rival, references Sonic in Donkey Kong Country 2, by showing Sonic's shoes next to a trash can that reads "No Hopers" on the Cranky's Video Game Heroes screen.

Sonic has appeared in several crossover games, including playable appearances in Super Smash Bros. Brawl (2008), Super Smash Bros. for Nintendo 3DS and Wii U (2014), and Super Smash Bros. Ultimate (2018), Lego Dimensions (2015),, Cookie Run: Kingdom (2021), and Fortnite Battle Royale (2026). He appears in the crossover party game series Mario & Sonic at the Olympic Games and is also a playable character in all three Sega Superstars games. An official Sonic the Hedgehog skin is available in the platformer battle royale game Fall Guys. Sonic appears as a playable character in Puyo Puyo Tetris 2 via free update. An official Sonic the Hedgehog world with skins are available with DLC in Minecraft. He is also appears as an unlockable playable character in Super Monkey Ball: Banana Blitz HD, Super Monkey Ball Banana Mania and Super Monkey Ball Banana Rumble.

=== Animation ===
The first three animated series featuring Sonic were created by the international company DiC. The first of these series, Adventures of Sonic the Hedgehog, premiered in 1993, and depicts Sonic and his friend Tails opposing Doctor Ivo Robotnik and his robots on the planet Mobius. Another animated series premiering the same year, simply titled Sonic the Hedgehog, depicts Sonic and a group of rebels aiming to defeat Robotnik in a futuristic version of Mobius. The third animated series, Sonic Underground, premiered in 1999, and features Sonic as the protagonist alongside his siblings Sonia and Manic.

In 1996, a two-part original video animation, Sonic the Hedgehog, was released in Japan. For the American release, the two episodes combined and released as Sonic the Hedgehog: The Movie by ADV Films. A new series, Sonic X, began airing in 2003. The 78-episode anime series detailed Sonic's struggle to protect the Chaos Emeralds from Eggman and new villains. Featuring a cross-world and interstellar journey, Sonic X depicted Sonic and his human friend Chris Thorndyke in quests to save the world. Sonic: Night of the Werehog is a short film produced by Sega's VE Animation Studio, released to coincide with the release of Sonic Unleashed. In the film, Sonic and Chip enter a haunted house, and must deal with two ghosts trying to scare them in attempt to win the heart of the girl ghost. Sonic makes multiple cameo appearances in the Disney film Wreck-It Ralph (2012) and its sequel Ralph Breaks the Internet (2018). Additionally, Sonic will also make a cameo appearance in The Angry Birds Movie 3.

In October 2013, Sega announced a computer-animated series, Sonic Boom. The show ran for 104 11-minute episodes between 2014 and 2017 on Cartoon Network in the U.S. and the UK, and Canal J and Gulli in France. Sonic makes several appearances in 2014 anime Hi-sCoool! SeHa Girls and guest-stars in the OK K.O.! Let's Be Heroes episode "Let's Meet Sonic".

In February 2021, Sonic Prime was announced by Netflix with a 2022 release window, though the series' development was initially revealed in a deleted tweet in December 2020. The show is primarily for children ages six to eleven, as well as longtime fans of the franchise. In October 2022, Netflix set its release for December. In the series, after recklessly breaking the Paradox Prism which breaks the entire universe and creates several alternative dimensions and versions of his friends, Sonic desperately seeks to restore them and embarks on a mission to find the shards of the Prism and fix it.

=== Live-action films ===
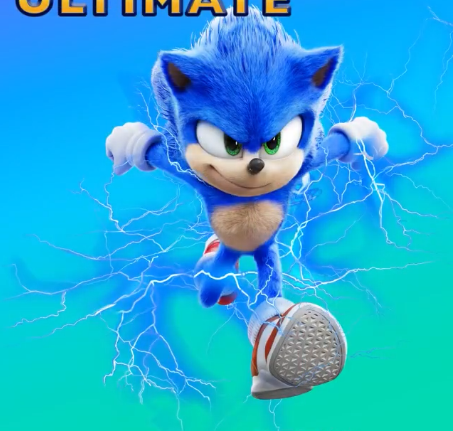
Sonic's design in the film series

On June 10, 2014, a film based on the Sonic series was announced. Simply known as Sonic the Hedgehog, it was produced by Neal Moritz on his Original Film banner alongside Takeshi Ito and Mie Onishi, with Toby Ascher as executive producer. The film was written by Pat Casey and Josh Miller and produced as a joint venture between Paramount Pictures and Marza Animation Planet. The film is a live-action and CGI hybrid. The movie was filmed in 2018, with a release date initially set for November 8, 2019. Upon the release of the film's first trailer in late April 2019, however, Sonic's appearance was heavily criticized, leading to the director, Jeff Fowler, to announce a redesign of him, pushing back the release date to February 14, 2020. The second trailer for the film was released on November 12, 2019, featuring the redesign, which drew in a far more positive response from both fans and critics alike. In the first film, it centers on Sonic, born with supersonic speed powers and abilities, who befriends the sheriff named Tom Wachowski, to stop the villainous Dr. Robotnik who plots to have Sonic's speed powers for world domination. Particular issues with his design included his teeth and legs. According to Paramount marketing president Marc Weinstock, the negative reaction to the original design resulted in a change to how video game adaptations are handled at the company. A sequel, Sonic the Hedgehog 2, was released on April 8, 2022, and it centers on Sonic and Tails on a race to prevent Robotnik and Knuckles from getting the hands on the Master Emerald.

The original design of Sonic from the first movie's initial trailer appears in Chip 'n Dale: Rescue Rangers, voiced by Tim Robinson. Named "Ugly Sonic", he is portrayed as a washed up actor looking to make a comeback after he was kicked off the film.

Sonic briefly appears as a player's avatar in the 2018 film Ready Player One.

=== Print media ===
Sonic's first comic appearance was in a promotional comic printed in Disney Adventures magazine (and also given away as a free pull-out with a copy of Mean Machines magazine), which established a backstory for the character involving the origin of his color and abilities and the transformation of kindly scientist Dr. Ovi Kintobor into the evil Dr. Ivo Robotnik. Numerous British publications, including "Sega handbook" Stay Sonic (1993), four novels published by Virgin Books (1993–1994) and the comic book Sonic the Comic (1993–2001), published by Fleetway Publications/Egmont Publishing, used this premise as their basis.

The American comics published by Archie Comics, Sonic the Hedgehog (1993–2017), Sonic X (2005–2008), and Sonic Universe (2009–2017) are based on the settings established by earlier animated TV series, the ABC "SatAM" cartoon, the Sonic X anime, and an expansion to the series, respectively. The former series is currently the second longest-running licensed comic series in the history of American comic books, second only to Marvel's Conan series (first issue released in 1970). In France two comic books named "Sonic Adventures" were published by Sirène in 1994. Guinness World Records recognized Sonic comic as the longest-running comic based on a game. Archie Comics also released a twelve part crossover with Mega Man beginning in 2013. The Archie comics were later succeeded by a new comic series by IDW Publishing in 2018, which is currently ongoing.

Sonic has also been featured in two different manga. One series was simply called Sonic the Hedgehog, and featured a story about a normal hedgehog boy named Nicky who can change into Sonic. The other series was a compilation of short stories and was separated into two volumes, the first being called Dash and Spin, and the other called Super Fast Sonic!!.

In 2025, Sonic was featured in the crossover miniseries DC X Sonic the Hedgehog, in which he and his friends team up with the Justice League to stop Darkseid from harnessing the Chaos Emeralds and using their power to conquer the multiverse. Sonic partners with the Flash, and the frequently debates him over which of them is faster. Sonic later returns in the sequel Metal Legion, in which he and his friends team up to battle Doctor Eggman and the Legion of Doom.

== Characteristics ==
According to various official materials from Sega, Sonic is described as a character who is "like the wind": a drifter who lives as he wants, and makes life a series of events and adventures. Sonic hates oppression and staunchly defends freedom. Although he is mostly quick-witted and easygoing, he has a short temper and is often impatient with slower things. Sonic is a habitual daredevil hedgehog who is honest, loyal to friends, keeps his promises, and dislikes tears. He took the young Tails under his wing like a little brother, and is uninterested in marital proposals from Amy Rose. In times of crisis, he focuses intensely on the challenge, as if his personality had undergone an astonishing change.

Sonic's greatest strength is his running speed, being known in the game's universe as the world's fastest hedgehog. Many of his abilities are variations on the tendency for hedgehogs to roll into tight balls for protection with the addition of spinning his body. Since his introduction in 1991's Sonic the Hedgehog, Sonic's primary offensive maneuver is the basic "Spin Attack" (or "Sonic Spin Attack"). Later games in the series expanded on this basic attack and two of these enhancements have become mainstays of his: the Spin Dash which was introduced in Sonic the Hedgehog 2 and involves Sonic spinning on the spot before blasting off at full speed, and the Homing Attack, officially introduced in Sonic Adventure, in which Sonic dashes toward a target in midair. Sonic's only weakness is that he cannot swim, sinking like a rock if plunged to a deep body of water. The reason for this is because Yuji Naka had a misunderstanding about hedgehogs not being able to swim. The only exception is that he can swim in the Sonic the Hedgehog Adventure Gamebooks. When the seven Chaos Emeralds are collected and used, Sonic transforms into "Super Sonic" (スーパーソニック), a faster, stronger and invulnerable version of himself that can fly. In Super Sonic form, Sonic's irises turn red and his body becomes golden.

== Reception and legacy ==
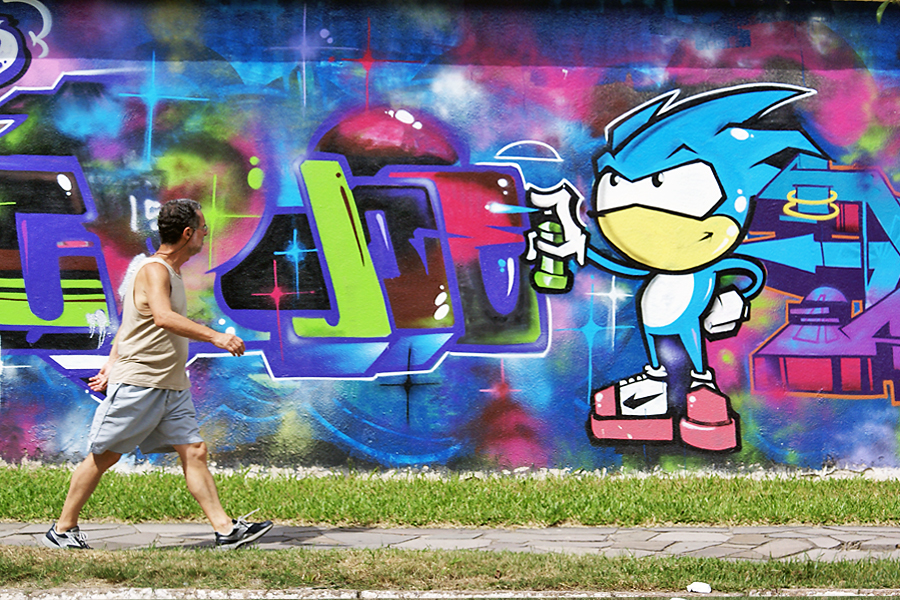
Graffiti artwork of Sonic the Hedgehog seen in Porto Alegre, Brazil in 2011

As Sega's mascot and one of the key reasons for the company's success during the 16-bit era of video game consoles, Sonic is one of the most famous video game characters in the world. In 1993, Sonic became the first video game character to have a balloon in Macy's Thanksgiving Day Parade. In 1996, Sonic was also the first video game character to be seen in a Rose Parade. Sonic was one of the three game characters inducted on the inaugural Walk of Game class in 2005, along with former rivals Mario and Link (both from Nintendo). One of a class of genes involved in fruit fly embryonic development, called hedgehog genes, has been named "sonic hedgehog" after him.

On the other hand, Sonic's apparent romantic relationship with Princess Elise in the 2006 video game resulted in major criticism. Sonic's characterization and relationship with Eggman in Sonic Boom earned a positive response by Patrick Lee of The A.V. Club and Emily Ashby of Common Sense Media.

Sonic has also been used as a symbol for Sega's various sponsorships. Between 1993 and 1997, Sega sponsored the JEF United Ichihara Chiba football team, during which period Sonic appeared in the team's uniform. During the 1993 Formula One championship, Sega sponsored the Williams Grand Prix team, which won the Constructors' Championship that year, as well as the team's lead driver, Alain Prost, winning the Drivers' Championship. Sonic was featured in the cars, helmets, and their rivals McLaren used to paint a squashed hedgehog after winning races over Williams. The 1993 European Grand Prix featured a Sonic balloon and Sonic billboards. In 1992, Sonic was found to be more recognizable than Mickey Mouse among the 6-11 year-old demographic, based on the character's respective Q Scores. In 1994, a poll conducted in the United Kingdom found that Sonic was the most recognizable fictional character among the 11-14 year-old demographic.

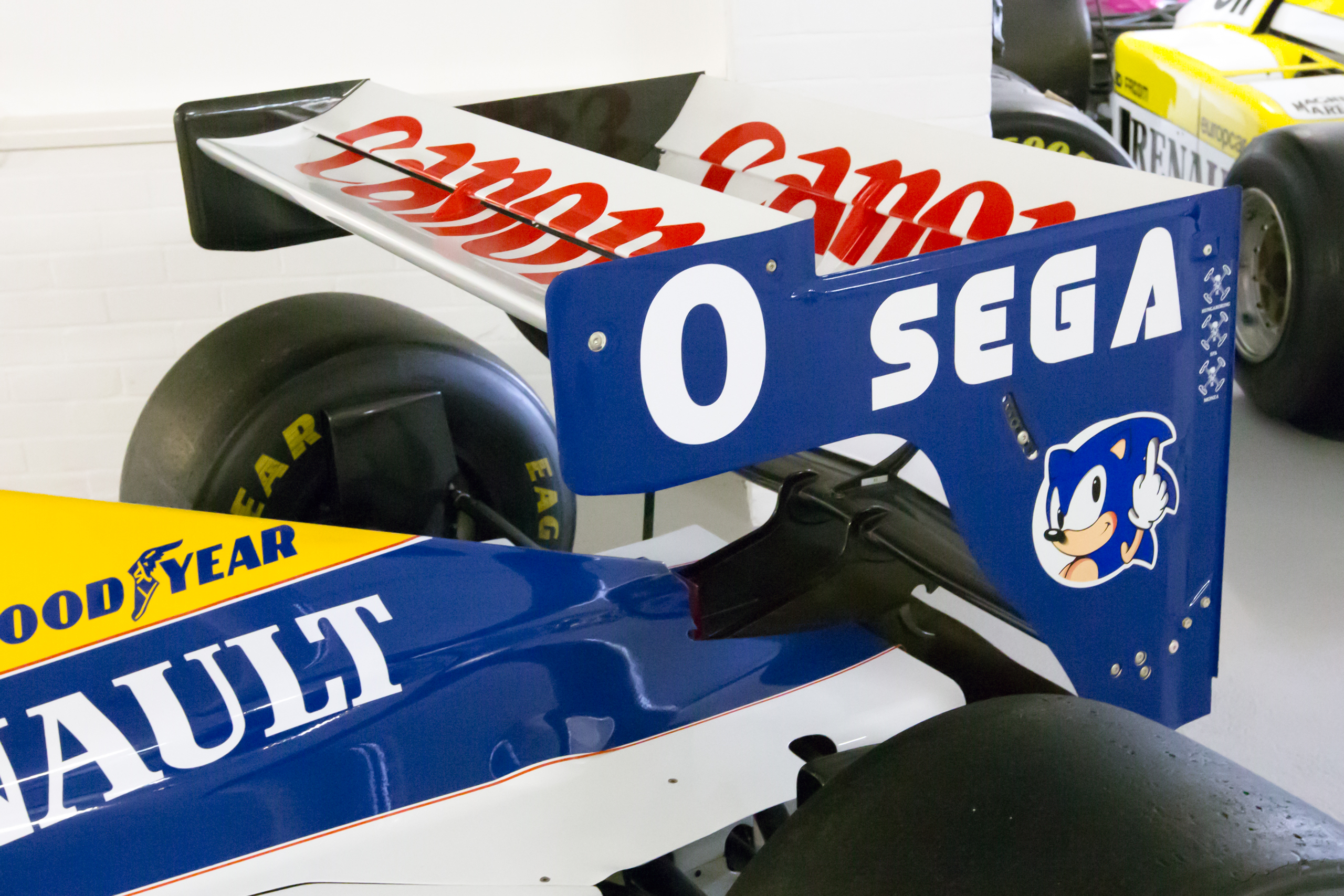
Sonic featured on the Williams FW15C rear wing

Nintendo Power listed Sonic as their sixth favorite hero, stating that while he was originally Mario's nemesis, he seems at home on Nintendo platforms. They added that he has remained as one of gaming's greatest icons. In 2004, the character won a Golden Joystick Award for "The Sun Ultimate Gaming Hero". The character's popularity declined in the mid-1990s, and Sonic failed to place in Electronic Gaming Monthly's Coolest Mascot of 1996 in either the editors' or readers' picks, being beaten out by not only competitors Mario and Crash Bandicoot, but Sega's own Nights; however, in a 2008 poll of 500 people, Sonic was voted the most popular video game character in the UK with a 24% vote while his old rival Mario came second with 21% of the vote. Later that year, Sonic was ranked as the most iconic video game character in an MSN rankings list. In 2011, Empire ranked him as the 14th greatest video game character. And he was voted 10th out of the top 50 video game characters of all time in Guinness World Records 2011 Gamers' Edition. Sonic ranked ninth on GameDaily's Top 10 Smash Bros characters list. GameDaily also listed his "next-generation stumble" in their list of video game characters' worst moments, using his relationship with a human female as one of the worst parts of it. In 2024, a poll conducted by BAFTA with around 4,000 respondents named Sonic the Hedgehog as the fourth most iconic video-game character of all time, only behind Lara Croft, Mario and Agent 47.

Ken Balough, Sega's former associate brand manager, said that Sonic's appeal endured because the character is "a gaming legend, first and foremost" who originated "from a series of games that defined a generation in gaming history, and his iconic personality was the epitome of speed in the early '90s, pushing the limits of what gamers knew and expected from high-speed action and platforming games."

A Japanese team developing the Radio & Plasma Wave Investigation (RPWI) instrumentation for the Jupiter Icy Moons Explorer spacecraft, launched by ESA and Airbus in 2022, was able to gain Sega's approval to use Sonic as the mascot for the device. Specifically, Sonic appears on the logo of the RPWI in his classic design, the rendition being a redraw of how Sonic appears on the Japanese and PAL box art for Sonic the Hedgehog.

An Internet meme called "Sanic" centers on a poorly-drawn rendition of Sonic; typically, the meme uses one of Sonic's catchphrases but with incorrect grammar. Sega's official Sonic Twitter account has made numerous references to it, and it appeared in official downloadable content for Sonic Forces on in-game shirts. The meme also appears as a drawing in the theatrical film.
