= Ryuji Masuda =

Japanese animator

- 増田 龍治
- Born: 1968 (age 56–57); Kumamoto, Japan
- Occupation: Animation director
- Notable work: Popee the Performer; Mr. Stain on Junk Alley; Funny Pets
- Spouse: Wakako Masuda (m. 1998; div. 2018)
- Children: 2

Ryuji Masuda (増田 龍治, Masuda Ryūji; born 1968) is a Japanese CGI animation director. His works include Popee the Performer, Mr. Stain on Junk Alley and Funny Pets. He has been known to be active in both his native Kumamoto and Okinawa.

== Works ==
List of works in media
Release date	Media	Crew role	Note
January 4, 2000 - January 1, 2003	Popee the Performer (POPEE the ぱフォーマー, POPEE the pa fōmā)	Director, original script/story writer	Debut work
January 6, 2003 - March 25, 2003	Mr. Stain on Junk Alley (ガラクタ通りのステイン, Garakuta-Doori no Sutein)	Director, original script/story writer	
2003	Drive Car (ドライブカー)	Director, original script/story writer	music video
May 28, 2004	Onsen Tamago ~Yukemuri Kidan~ (温泉タマゴ ~湯けむり奇談~)	Director of "Yoshiko's 6th Sense", Screenplay writer of "Onsen Konoshi Doki"	3-in-1 live action/CG animated drama movie
January 11, 2006 - March 28, 2006	Funny Pets (ファニーペッツ, Fanī Petsu (Alternative name: Funny Pets Plus: Poetic and Lunatic))	Director, original script/story writer	
2007-2009	Petit Eva (Evangelion@School)	CG Supervisor	
April 1, 2009 - March 31, 2010	Charady's Daily Joke (キャラディのジョークな毎日, Charady no Joke no Mainichi)	Overall Director	
November 22, 2013	OH! Jesus (オー！ジーザス)	Director, original script/story writer	manga-like anime

== Awards ==
In 2003, he received Excellent Animation Award in Cultural Affair Agencies Media Art Festival.

== Books ==
In 2002, he helped with the Popee the Performer manga (he wrote the Magazine Z manga).

In 2007, he wrote the Mr. Stain and Funny Pets picture books.

== Others ==
- Special lecturer at Kyoto University of Art and Design.
- Member of Directors Guild of Japan.

== Personal life ==
During university, he studied film, but while looking for a job, he met anime director Seiji Endo, and although he got a job at an anime company, he left the company. He was impressed by the CG of Jurassic Park, which was being released at the time, and studied in the CG department of a game company.
