= Martin Burke =

Irish voice actor

- Born: Martin William Burke; February 12, 1968 (age 58); Austin Texas, U.S.
- Occupation: Actor
- Years active: 1997–present

Martin Burke is an American voice and theatre actor based in Austin, Texas.

He voiced Sonic the Hedgehog in the English-language release of the Sonic the Hedgehog OVA and Sumida in Dai-Guard, while he has also had acting roles in underground films like Lethal Force and Blood Chase. He also voiced Shiro Amakusa in Ninja Resurrection.

== Filmography ==
Year	Title	Role	Notes
1997	Sakura Diaries	Touma Inaba	1 episode English dub
1997–1998	Ninja Resurrection	Tokisada Shiro Amakusa	2 episodes English dub
1998	Queen Emeraldas	Hiroshi Umino	English dub
1998	Getter Robo Armageddon	Yoshida	English dub
1999	Dai-Guard	Sumida	English dub
1999	Sonic the Hedgehog: The Movie	Sonic the Hedgehog	English dub
2001	Lethal Force	Oscar	
2003	Mazinkaiser	Shiro Kabuto	English dub
