= Popee the Performer =

- ポピーザぱフォーマー
- Genre: Slapstick; Surreal humor Comedy; Dark comedy
- Created by: Ryuji Masuda
- Opening theme: Popee the Clown
- Country of origin: Japan
- No. of seasons: 3
- No. of episodes: 39

Production
- Running time: 5 minutes
- Production companies: Zuiyo; Nippon Columbia

Original release
- Network: Kids Station
- Release: January 3, 2000 – December 28, 2001
- Release: January 1, 2003

Popee the Performer (Japanese: ポピーザぱフォーマー, Hepburn: Popī za Pafōmā), also known as Popee the Clown (Japanese: ポピーthe クラウン, Hepburn: Popī za Kuraun), is a Japanese children's 3D CGI anime series created by Ryuji Masuda. It aired on Kids Station between 2000 and 2003. Despite being aimed at children, the series is known for its use of adult-oriented and controversial themes.

== Premise ==
Set in the middle of a desert, in a place called Wolf Circus, the show follows two characters, Popee the clown and his wolf sidekick Kedamono, rehearsing their circus performances. In each episode, the rehearsals go awry and devolve into often violent and/or surreal situations. The second season introduces Popee's father, Papi, the senior clown of the Wolf Circus, who often acts as the instructor for the other two, but his lessons he tries to teach do not go as planned, and sometimes, he only makes things worse.

== Production ==
Popee the Performer was originally aired in 2000 on Kids Station—a television station in Japan, and in 2014, it was aired on Asianet Maa (now Star Maa). The anime was created by Ryuji Masuda and his then-wife Wakako Masuda. There is also a manga adaptation created by Wakako. Ryuji Masuda created the show to fill a five-minute slot on Kids Station. The show had a budget of 100,000 yen per month. Due to the low budget, the series had no voice actors and was set in a desert to avoid rendering complex scenes. The show had three people working on it: Ryuji Masuda, Wakako Masuda, and a 3D animator hired from a video game company. Production began three months before the show aired. The 27th episode, "Knife Game", featured Popee, Kedamono and Papi playing the titular game, and the episode was not aired for fears that children would imitate the game.

The entire series was made through the use of 3D computer graphics and animation. Many shortcuts were taken to save on labor and rendering costs, such as the reuse of patterns and scenes. Each episode's animation took between 9 and 13 days to produce.

== Reception ==
Popee the Performer has been described as "a twisted mockery of children's shows" and a "dark, messed-up series" due to its violence and unintentional horror; the visual style has also been called "offputting". In addition, it has been called a "trauma anime" and a show that "should not be searched online" in Japan. The show was nevertheless praised for its comedic appeal despite its lack of dialogue. Screen Rant described the series as "disturbing, nonsensical, and utterly cursed in every way possible".

The show has been compared to Looney Tunes and Tom and Jerry due to its slapstick humour and silent comedy.

== Episodes ==
Season	Episodes	Originally released	
Season	Episodes	First released	Last released
1	13	January 3, 2000	March 27, 2000
2	13	July 6, 2001	September 28, 2001
3	13	October 5, 2001	December 28, 2001
Special	1	December 31, 2002	

=== Season 1 (2000) ===
No. overall	No. in season	Title	Original release date
1	1	"MAGIC"	January 3, 2000
Popee performs a magic trick by placing Keda in a box and cutting him in half with a chainsaw. When he is put back together again, his bottom half is the wrong way round. Angry, Keda chases Popee, puts him into a similar box and cuts it to pieces with the chainsaw, but finds he has created an army of Popee clones who surround him.
2	2	"LIMBO"	January 10, 2000
Popee tries to Limbo (dance) underneath a bar, but keeps falling over. When Keda laughs at him jumping around in frustration, Popee tells Keda to perform the trick, which he does. Envious, Popee sets the bar to the lowest level and sets it on fire. Keda performs the stunt, but sets his tail on fire. Keda chases after Popee until they fall into a box of fireworks which is lit by Keda's tail, and they are both thrown into the air and blown up by two large aerial shells.
3	3	"ACROBATICS"	January 17, 2000
Popee performs a contortion act by squeezing into a tight cylinder, but is unable to get out. When a storm starts, Keda puts an umbrella into the cylinder with Popee, but Popee is immediately struck by lightning. Keda prepares to lay a flower on Popee's body when Popee wakes up and begins attracting nearby magnetic objects, including a truck which collides violently with him. Keda lays the flower on Popee's body and cries, then begins to eat a pot of chicken legs which Popee previously attracted. When Popee wakes up, Keda, embarrassed, hides by contorting himself into the pot.
4	4	"KNIFE THROWER"	January 24, 2000
Popee fastens Keda to a fence and tries to throw a knife to split an apple on Keda's head, but misses and hits Keda in the face, killing him. As Keda's angel ascends to heaven, Popee tempts it back with a chicken leg, then fastens the angel to the fence and unsuccessfully attempts the trick again. Popee repeatedly fails the trick, each time bringing Keda's angel back with a chicken leg, until a knife bounces off the backboard and kills Popee. Popee's angel refuses to ascend and instead attempts the trick again and again, repeatedly killing himself.
5	5	"FIRE BREATHER"	January 31, 2000
Popee practices a fire-breathing act, but accidentally trips over and farts gasoline, blasting him into space where he collides with a flying saucer. When the saucer crash-lands, Popee accidentally breathes fire on the alien as it arrives. The alien forces Popee and Keda to repair the saucer, but Keda accidentally destroys it, and the alien starts to cry. Popee and Keda pour gasoline into the alien and press his stomach until he farts, sending him back into space.
6	6	"PANTOMIME"	February 7, 2000
Popee and Keda are practicing miming interacting with invisible objects. After Keda nearly runs Popee over while miming driving a car, Popee starts throwing bombs at him. Keda mimes a staircase and runs to the top to escape, but Popee starts firing a cannon at him. Keda jumps from the staircase and mimes diving to safely land and "swim" in the ground, then dives "underwater" to place a bomb near Popee, blowing him up. Seeing Popee lying unconscious, Keda swims over to him only for Popee to reveal he is awake and hiding an even bigger bomb, and they are both blown into a giant crater. Popee mimes pulling on a rope to pull himself out of the crater, but below him Keda does the same and mimes a rope attached to Popee's neck. The weight causes Popee's rope to snap and both of them fall into the crater.
7	7	"KARATE SHOW"	February 14, 2000
Popee is practicing board breaking while Keda makes a birthday cake. Popee karate-chops the cake several times, upsetting Keda until he sees Popee has actually perfectly sliced the cake. While Keda is distracted, a frog eats the cake; Popee tries to karate-chop it but it bites his hand. Seeing the frog refusing to let go, Popee eats the frog, but it takes control of his body and tries to eat Keda. Keda finds a skateboard and uses it to grind along Popee's extended frog tongue and kick him in the back of the head, causing him to vomit up the frog, which in turn vomits up the cake.
8	8	"FIRE RING"	February 21, 2000
Popee tries to persuade Keda to jump through a flaming ring, but Keda is afraid to do so, even when bribed with a chicken leg. Popee prepares to offer Keda an entire plate of chicken legs while Keda builds a dummy of himself out of two balls and one of his masks. Keda attempts to steal the chicken legs while Popee is distracted by the dummy, but when Popee whips the dummy it bounces along the floor and successfully passes through the ring. Popee happily attempts to give the chicken legs to the dummy. Frustrated, Keda attempts the stunt himself and misses, catching himself and Popee in the burning ring and burning down the circus.
9	9	"MIMIC"	February 28, 2000
Keda is washing his collection of masks while painting a new "gorilla" mask when Popee grabs it, puts it on and starts acting like a gorilla, breaking the washing line. Keda distracts Popee with bananas, shoots him with a tranquiliser dart, and attempts to remove the mask but cannot do so. Instead, Keda paints a "robot" mask and puts it on Popee, allowing him to ride Popee around while steering with a remote control. When he crashes Popee into a wall, the remote control breaks and Popee begins to malfunction, firing eye lasers and tickling hands at Keda. Keda manages to shoot Popee with the rifle again, breaking both of the masks. The episode ends with Keda placing a "chair" mask on Popee and standing on him to hang the masks back on the line.
10	10	"GUNMAN"	March 6, 2000
Keda and Popee are practicing shooting bottles out of the air when Keda misses a bottle, is hit on the head, and shoots off one of Popee's ears. Popee then attempts to shoot a Keda doll, but when Keda grabs at him he misses and the bullet ricochets back at them; after trying to hide, Keda eats the bullet, and it flies out of his anus into Popee's mouth. Realising what just happened, Popee starts firing a machine gun at Keda, who deflects one of the bullets with a frying pan; Popee uses the gun as a tennis racket and they play tennis with the bullet, which both of them begin to enjoy until Popee collides with the back of the circus carriage and the bullet hits him between the eyes.
11	11	"SWALLOWER"	March 13, 2000
Popee practices Sword swallowing a sword thrown in the air, and impales himself. Keda tries to remove the sword, but when he cannot do so by hand, ties the sword to the back of the circus truck and drives it around at high speed, dragging Popee around with him until he jumps the truck over a wall, blowing it up but pulling out the sword. Popee angrily chases Keda with the sword until Keda jumps into the air and Popee swallows him in the same way as the sword. When Keda tries to climb out, Popee swallows the sword again to hit Keda; inside Popee, Keda also swallows the sword, leaving both of them impaled through and staked to the ground.
12	12	"ESCAPE SHOW"	March 20, 2000
Popee has Keda, who is hungry, help him practice Escapology by tying him to a stake next to a bomb on a countdown timer. Popee gets one hand free, but then becomes trapped underneath the stake. Keda attempts to stop the bomb but they are both blown into space and captured by a flying saucer. Popee awakens tied to a table where the alien prepares to vivisect him, but Popee frees a hand and knocks the scalpel away. The alien first threatens and then bribes Keda with a chicken leg to inject Popee with poison, but after Keda does so, the alien destroys the chicken leg with a ray gun. Furious, Keda pounces on the alien, causing the ray gun to go off and hit the ceiling, destroying the saucer. As they fall back to earth, Keda is still hungry, and sees a knife and fork from the saucer heading towards the unconscious alien.
13	13	"DANCE"	March 27, 2000
Popee practices dancing but collides with a wall while performing a breakdancing move, knocking out his eyes, which Keda steps on and breaks. Keda tries a number of different objects as replacement eyes for Popee, and they eventually settle on a pair of large daisies. When Keda accidentally reveals he broke Popee's previous eyes, Popee begins to throw bombs at Keda. Struggling to escape, Keda sticks an antenna into one of Popee's eyes, causing Popee to twitch violently and begin playing music through his mouth. Keda replaces Popee's other eye with a radio tuning knob and uses him as a radio to play music for both of them to dance to.

=== Season 2 (2001) ===
No. overall	No. in season	Title	Original release date
14	1	"GREAT MAGIC"	July 6, 2001
Popee is repeating the chainsaw trick from the first episode when an older magician, Papi, arrives on his half-elephant-half-carriage Paola. Papi demonstrates cutting himself in half with the saw, then climbs unharmed from a nearby chest, revealing that it was Keda who was cut in half. He encourages Popee and Keda to try the trick; Keda refuses, but Popee cuts a bleeding wound in his stomach. Angry, Popee makes several attempts to kill Papi, but he switches places with Keda each time. Now crazed, Popee begins to see Papi in every object and person in the circus, and chainsaws all of them and finally himself - but then emerges intact from the chest, completing the trick. Papi's severed limbs begin to applaud as Popee splits into two halves in the chest.
15	2	"MIRAGE"	July 13, 2001
Papi watches Popee and Keda practice the "invisible wall" mime routine and is amazed to see Keda's ability to climb and stand on the wall. As Popee becomes envious and frustrated, Papi throws a bomb at both of them and blows them into a distant desert where they attempt to chase a mirage. Keda mimes swimming to create a channel of water and enter the mirage, leaving Popee behind. Furious and desperate, Popee manifests the same ability and creates a giant sword which he throws into the mirage, shattering it and flooding the entire desert, apparently drowning himself, Keda and Papi.
16	3	"STOP THE GUN"	July 20, 2001
Popee and Keda successfully perform a Bullet catch for Papi. Papi encourages them to try again using a rocket launcher and Kedo blows Popee's head off. Seeing Popee dead, Papi throws a bomb at Keda that sends him back in time to the start of the scene. Keda tackles his previous self, causing the rocket to miss, ricochet, and kill both Popee and Papi. Keda retrieves the time travel bomb from Papi's body and sends both copies of Keda back. They are able to prevent the tackle and slightly adjust the angle of the rocket to only hit Popee's ear, but a furious Popee then attacks the Kedas and Papi with the rocket launcher, eventually killing Papi who rolls the time travel bomb towards the Kedas, sending them back a third time. The scene restarts again and Popee and Papi realise they are surrounded by an army of thousands of versions of Keda.
17	4	"POISON"	July 27, 2001
Popee and Keda practice gymnastics, but Popee becomes envious that Keda's routine is far more sophisticated and kicks a scorpion at him which stings him. Keda throws the scorpion back at Popee and it stings him too. Papi performs mouth-to-mouth resuscitation on Keda and sucks out the poison, healing him. Hating the idea of being "kissed" by Papi, Popee throws knives at him and is about to commit suicide using a pistol, but Papi sucks out his poison. Popee kicks him away, causing Papi to swallow the poison. Popee and Keda argue over who should suck out the poison until Papi dies and they bury him. As they walk away from the grave, Papi jumps out, rushes at Popee and kisses him, transferring the poison back to Popee.
18	5	"ELEPHANT"	August 3, 2001
Popee sees Keda riding Paola, Papi's elephant-carriage. He tries to climb on himself, but Paola throws him off each time. Popee attempts to befriend Paola by offering her apples, but she refuses them, giving them to Keda instead. When Paola allows Keda to feed her an apple, Popee becomes furious and attempts to secretly inject an apple with poison; Keda, seeing Popee upset, pats him on the shoulder, causing Popee to accidentally stab himself with the poison. Popee's ghost appears and menaces Keda and Paola until Keda sucks it, and a passing fly, into a vacuum cleaner. The fly, possessed by Popee's spirit, flies out of the cleaner and lands on top of Paola, successfully "riding" her for a moment before Paola swats him.
19	6	"DREAM"	August 10, 2001
Popee falls on top of Keda, knocking them both out. Keda dreams of bouncing around while Popee dreams of being chased by a nightmare version of himself. In the real world, Papi attempts to wake Popee by tickling him, causing the bouncing Keda in the dream to land on the nightmare Popee and destroy him, making Popee laugh. As it begins to rain, Popee and Keda both begin to roll around, and Papi bangs his head on the floor to knock himself out and enter the dream in which all three are drowning. Papi encourages them to swim upwards, then takes out a bomb which blasts them all out of the water and into the clouds where they escape and rejoice. In the real world, all three are now dead, blown up by the bomb.
20	7	"HYPNOTISM"	August 17, 2001
Papi uses a swinging pendant to hypnotise Keda, the frog and Paola into believing they are birds, giving them the ability to fly. He attempts to hypnotise Popee, but Popee refuses and takes out his own pendant, starting a duel. Popee and Papi make each other act as a cat, dog, snake and several others until they both hypnotise each other at the same time into acting like worms. The "birds" dive on the "worm" Papi, eat and skeletonise him. As they dive towards Popee, the reflection of the skeleton in Popee's eyes hypnotises them and they die and become skeletons. As Papi dies, his eye rolls out and hypnotises Popee, turning him into Papi.
21	8	"SUPER STRENGTH"	August 24, 2001
Papi and Keda watch Popee lift a heavy barbell. Keda is impressed but Papi shows that he can lift it much more easily. Popee injects himself with a strength drug allowing him to lift and throw the barbell with one hand. Papi lifts the circus truck, and Popee strikes the ground, creating a crevasse that Papi gets stuck in. Papi throws the truck at Popee, and he catches it but then slips on a banana skin, dropping the truck on himself. Papi lifts himself out of the crevasse by the neck, but does not stop and lifts himself into the sky; Popee throws the truck at him to knock him into space. Papi retaliates by throwing the moon at Popee, but he catches it and narrowly avoids stepping on the banana skin again. He then bends down to pick up the banana skin, releasing the moon, which falls and destroys the Earth.
22	9	"PREDICTION"	August 31, 2001
Papi uses a crystal ball and he and Keda see Popee rescue the frog from being accidentally flattened by Paola by pushing Paola away and re-inflating the frog, causing the frog to reward him by vomiting a huge array of sweets. Keda races outside and sees Popee heading towards Paola, but Popee has doubts about saving the frog. Keda pleads with him and then switches his mask to Popee's face and hits Popee with a blowdart, knocking him out. As Popee, Keda attempts to move Paola but cannot do so, and shoots Paola with a blowdart too. Keda then inflates the frog but does so to a huge size. Inside the frog's mouth, Keda sees all of the sweets being eaten by Papi, who shoots Keda with a blowdart. Keda sticks the blowdart into the frog, causing it to return to normal size. The frog then vomits a tiny cake.
23	10	"GHOST"	September 7, 2001
Papi performs an impalement illusion based on Pop up pirate, sticking swords into a barrel Popee is in before revealing he is unharmed. Papi offers a sword to Keda, who attempts the trick but stabs Popee, killing him. Papi and Keda bury Popee. As Keda watches TV, Popee's ghost emerges through the TV, drags Kedo into the barrel and prepares to stab him; but Papi runs forward and resuscitates Popee's body, causing his ghost to disappear. Popee furiously chases Papi and Kedo with the sword until Papi breaks his own and Kedo's necks. Papi and Kedo's ghosts return to watching TV while Popee is unable to harm them with the sword.
24	11	"MEDICINE"	September 14, 2001
Papi attempts to make several medicines to cure Popee's cold by throwing first the frog and then the scorpion into a large vat of water, but only makes him worse. He performs a ritual dance to summon an alien doctor who attempts to heal Popee. Papi throws the alien into the vat, creating a medicine that is so delicious that Papi and Keda begin drinking it, while the ailing Popee attempts to get their attention, fails and dies. Papi throws the dead Popee into the vat, but finding the liquid unpleasant, Papi and Keda climb into the vat and bathe in it like a hot spring.
25	12	"SAMURAI"	September 21, 2001
Popee and Papi perform a samurai duel, and freeze, each visualising ways the other might attack. Kedamono grows bored watching them stationary and attempts to eat a jar of sweets, but gets his hand stuck in the jar and his stomach growls loudly, with the sound reflecting in Popee and Papi's visualizations as a bombing raid by a gigantic white wolf. With Popee and Papi still stationary, Keda visualizes them staying still as a chill wind blows in and they both freeze and collapse. As the wind begins to blow, Keda races towards them and places his hand underneath Popee as he falls, causing the impact to break the jar; Keda eats the sweets as Popee and Papi lie frozen.
26	13	"MONOCYCLE"	September 28, 2001
Popee successfully performs several stunts on a unicycle, lengthening the unicycle each time; but accidentally runs over first the frog, and then Papi and Paola. Keda blows up the unicycle to prevent further accidents. The next day, Popee sees the unicycle lengthened so far it reaches into space and being ridden by the alien, who runs over Popee. Keda flees from the unicycle but just before he is run over, the alien bangs his head on a satellite and falls from the unicycle to Earth. Keda buries all of the other characters and then sits down to watch TV, but the damage to the satellite causes it to explode and cut off the TV signal.

=== Season 3 (2001) ===
No. overall	No. in season	Title	Original release date
27	1	"KNIFE GAME"	October 5, 2001
Popee plays the Knife game around Kedamono's hand, and successfully keeps going until an imprint of Keda's paw is cut out of the table, making Papi laugh. Keda does the same to Popee, creating an imprint of his hand, and they continue with the frog, the scorpion, Papi's hand, and several other objects. When Popee tries again with the frog, he accidentally hits one of the frog's toes, which hits Papi in the face; Keda takes the frog and repeats the trick more quickly and without error. Angry, Popee attempts the trick again, sending more fragments of the frog into Papi's face. Now furious, Papi begins cutting the frog to pieces, covering Popee's face in its remains, before accidentally cutting off his own hand.
28	2	"ALIEN"	October 12, 2001
When Popee and Keda repeatedly fail to perform the Rolling globe, Papi uses a ritual to summon the alien. When the alien refuses to attempt the stunt, Papi slaps them to the ground. Keda attempts to heal the alien but the alien refuses and knocks over a vial of liquid from the medical kit; Keda slaps the alien as well, and Popee then Suplexes it. The alien attempts to perform the stunt but falls; Papi is about to slap them again when the alien pulls out their ray gun and threatens Papi to perform the trick. He also attempts it but falls and the alien shoots Papi, setting him alight.
29	3	"DARK SIDE"	October 19, 2001
On a hot day, Keda brings a watermelon to Popee and Papi, but has trouble cutting it in half. Popee cuts it in half using a "air chop" which also cuts a nearby steeple in half; Papi then attempts the same but throws the melon in the air first, cutting both the melon and the sun in half and turning half of the screen black. Keda enters the dark side to wash his face without his mask where he cannot be seen; Popee then enters and begins cutting chunks off Paola's trunk. As soon as this revealed, an enraged Paola attacks Popee with a morning star. Papi enters the dark side and apparently sets up a gun chase scene from a gangster movie, which he performs, shooting Popee in the head in the process.
30	4	"VS GOD"	October 26, 2001
Popee and Kedamono are practicing juggling when Popee falls down and begins to cry in frustration, then throws a bomb into Keda's juggling pattern. Keda drops the clubs but throws the bomb back at Popee. Enraged, Popee begins throwing more bombs at Keda who travels to a mysterious stone face outside the circus and begins to pray. Popee prepares to plant a bomb near him when the eyes of the face open and blast Popee back through the entire circus. Keda begins cleaning and worshipping the stone face. Popee brings an offering of fruit to the face which secretly contains a bomb, but the eyes begin to open when he reaches for it. Popee takes Keda hostage, allowing him to detonate the bomb without being blasted, but blowing up both of them. Keda recovers from the blast and runs towards the face, but reveals that he has stolen the fruit from Popee's offering; the face blasts both of them.
31	5	"SLEEP"	November 2, 2001
Popee is performing a robot dance in front of Papi and Kedamono, and removes his eyelids to be able to perform without blinking. That night, Popee cannot sleep as he cannot close his eyes. Keda tries playing him a lullaby using a music box, waking Papi who attempts to give Popee milk with a baby bottle. Popee knocks the bottle away, causing Papi to become furious until Keda calms him down with the music box. Keda and Popee play a board game while Papi dances to the music box, but it eventually stops and Papi resumes attempting to feed Popee milk. When he is ignored, Papi becomes furious again and attacks Popee, apparently unbirthing him.
32	6	"IN THE MIND"	November 9, 2001
While practicing moving juggling, Keda falls over, causing birds and stars to fly around his head. Papi grabs and eats several of the birds, causing Papi and Popee to begin hitting Keda on the head repeatedly to cause different objects to appear. After failing to receive anything edible, Popee hits Papi with a mallet, causing his head to expand. After repeatedly hitting him, Papi's head becomes gigantic and Popee cuts it open with a chainsaw revealing a recursion of the same scene. Popee repeats the recusion over and over again until he falls over, hallucinating his own stars and birds, but he passes out when attempting to eat one.
33	7	"MIRROR"	November 16, 2001
During a bombing rampage Popee falls over and blasts himself into a mirror which he passes through. Popee arrives in a duplicate circus where an inverse Keda is throwing bombs at an inverse Popee. The original Popee threatens inverse Keda with his own bombs and the two begin a scary face contest until Papi looks through the mirror, getting his head stuck. Keda tries to pull Papi out of the mirror and damages his costume. Papi chases Keda around, while inside the mirror Popee and inverse Keda both throw bombs at Papi's head. Papi trips and falls and breaks the mirror, destroying the mirror universe and leaving Papi's head trapped in darkness while Keda sweeps up the pieces.
34	8	"OPENING"	November 23, 2001
Popee and Keda perform different variations on the opening sequence of the show, failing or being stopped each time, until Papi proposes a Kabuki themed opening.
35	9	"MY CAR"	November 30, 2001
Wanting a car but unable to afford one, Popee sees Papi remove Paola's elephant head in order to repair her carriage part. Popee steals the head and builds his own car to attach it to, but Paola attacks him. Meanwhile, Papi beheads Keda and sticks his head on the front of the carriage instead, causing Paola to cry and flee with Popee. A chase begins between the two carriages, ending with both exploding in a head-on collision and Papi being thrown into a crevasse.
36	10	"ERASER"	December 7, 2001
Keda finds a pencil eraser on the ground, and finds that it can erase parts of the circus wall. Popee demands Keda attempt the chainsaw trick from the first episode again, but collides with a chest and knocks himself out while threatening Keda with the giant sword. Keda erases Popee, but has actually turned him invisible. The invisible Popee chases and steals food from Keda. When Papi sees this, he stabs himself in the nose with a sword, giving himself a massive nosebleed that covers the invisible Popee in blood, but then turns the entire landscape and environment red, leaving Popee camouflaged instead.
37	11	"LONELINESS"	December 14, 2001
While Popee is asleep, Papi disappears while teaching Keda a vanishing act and Keda leaves to look for him. Popee wakes up to find himself alone in the circus. Uncomfortable, Popee makes wooden cut-outs of Keda and Papi to interact with, but they break. When Keda and Papi return to the circus they find their wooden cut-outs hanging from the entrance arch with knives stuck in them, and a distraught and crazed Popee hallucinating a clone of himself as an imaginary friend. Papi creates his own imaginary clone, who befriends the imaginary Popee and they leave together. Distraught, Popee hallucinates more and more copies of himself, and Papi does the same. Keda leaves on his own, and an imaginary Keda begins to follow him as he walks away.
38	12	"TIME"	December 21, 2001
The episode begins as VS GOD, except that Keda finds a strange clock lying under the stone face. When Popee throws a bomb at Keda, he drops the clock, stopping time, and puts the bomb on top of Popee instead. Keda begins to use the clock to perform tricks, and Papi offers him a chicken leg and then his moustache in exchange for the clock. Papi experiments with winding the clock in reverse, slowly, and then turns it forward quickly, causing Keda to die of old age. Papi's moustache, now turned white, jumps from Keda back onto Papi's face, causing him to instantly become old as well.
39	13	"FACE"	December 28, 2001
Popee has a dream of Keda's mask coming unfastened, and tries to take Keda's mask off while he is asleep, but finds only more masks underneath. Keda wakes up, and Popee pretends to be asleep; Keda uses a torch to check that Popee, Papi, the frog and the alien are all asleep before going behind a tent to take off his mask and wash his face. Popee accidentally wakes the frog and they both sneak up on Keda. The frog hops out directly in front of Keda and sees his face, and then begins hopping around the circus loudly shouting "Kedamono's face is..", waking up and attracting all the characters and items from the previous episodes who surround Keda. Keda eats the frog to prevent him finishing the sentence, but the frog peeks his head out of Keda's anus to end the sentence with ".. just like his mother's." Keda collapses on the floor, and the entire circus environment and everyone else except Popee fades away, leaving the two of them on barren land; Popee also collapses.

=== Special (2002) ===
Title	Original release date
"Popee the Performer Countdown Special"	December 31, 2002
Popee, Papi and Kedo are watching a new year's show on TV. Popee and Papi both fall asleep, with Popee falling off his chair. Keda notices a drop of mucus from Papi's nose about to fall into Popee's mouth, and a 10-second countdown starts of him searching the circus for items to catch it. Time runs out as the new year begins, but Papi wakes up sniffs the mucus back up again, and Popee and Papi watch the show while Kedo sleeps. This is followed by a series of short (1 minute) skits themed on various sports and games.
