= Sakura Diaries =

Japanese manga series

- Cover of the first manga volume

桜通信 (Sakura Tsuushin)
- Genre: Romantic comedy; Sex comedy
- Manga
- Written by: U-Jin
- Published by: Shogakukan
- Magazine: Weekly Young Sunday
- Original run: 1995 – 2000
- Volumes: 20
- Original video animation
- Directed by: Kunitoshi Okajima
- Produced by: Hideaki Kaneko (Victor Entertainment); Shōji Muronaga (Kitty Film); Tooru Taga; Hiroshi Wakao (Shaft)
- Written by: Kenji Terada
- Music by: Mitsuo Hagita
- Studio: Shaft
- Licensed by: NA: ADV Films
- Released: May 21, 1997 – October 22, 1997
- Runtime: 22 minutes
- Episodes: 12

Sakura Diaries (Japanese: 桜通信, Hepburn: Sakura Tsūshin) is a Japanese manga series written and illustrated by U-Jin. It was serialized in Shogakukan's seinen manga magazine Weekly Young Sunday from 1995 to 2000, with its chapters collected in twenty tankōbon volumes. It follows the adventures of a boy who, unable to get into a prestigious university, pretends to be a student there in order to impress a girl, while ending up having to go to cram school and living together with his cousin, who is in unrequited love with him. It was adapted into a 12-episode original video animation (OVA) series.

== Plot ==
Touma Inaba is a high school graduate who is trying to get into the prestigious Keio University. After dismissing a call girl he found strange the night before, he meets and falls in love with a red-headed woman named Mieko Yotsuba on the day of the entrance exam. When Mieko gets in to Keio but Touma does not, he pretends to have been accepted, while in reality enrolling in cram school in order to try again. In the meantime, he lives together with his cousin Urara Kasuga, who has a crush on him and is willing to do anything to help him (including impersonating a call girl in the first chapter). Urara encounters Mieko and Touma at karaoke, but pretends to be his sister. However, romantic rival Tatsuhiko Mashu suspects something is up, and after sleeping with Urara's friend Komi Natsuki, learns that Touma is not a university student. Mashu tricks Touma into revealing the truth to Mieko.

The heartbroken Touma starts a sexual relationship with Urara. The "happy couple" angers cram school teacher Kugenuma, who conspires to break the two up by framing Touma for harassment. The rumors force Touma to leave cram school, but Urara tries to work out a deal with Kugenuma for him to return. But when Touma learns the deal involves sexual favors, he breaks up with Urara.

When Urara discovers that she is pregnant, she joins Natsuki at an escort service to raise extra money. Suspsecting that Mashu has cheated on her, Mieko makes advances toward Touma, and they have sex. Urara, Natsuki and another girl named Mizuki hustle a client, but it backfires when the client beats Urara up and engineers the gang-rape of Natsuki. Urara suffers a miscarriage, but reunites with Touma. When Mashu sees Mieko with Touma, he tells Touma to back off, but he refuses and Mashu hatches a scheme wherein he has Natsuki give Touma a "memory-enhancing" incense as a study-aid. The incense is actually speed, to which Touma becomes addicted as he prepares for his next mock exam. Urara gives him an ultimatum to stop using the drug.

When Mizuki collapses and is hospitalized, Touma learns that she is his best friend Kouji's little sister and that she has been battling leukemia. When Kouji gets in trouble for shoplifting, Touma talks some sense into him. Urara takes on extra jobs to get a Christmas present for Touma, but when one of the hostess club patrons gets raunchy, she is saved by Ryuichi Kazama, a childhood friend who is ordered by Urara's father to be her home tutor and to secretly spy on them. When Ryuichi learns that Touma and Urara are living together, he kicks Touma out without telling Urara, and then tries to make a move on her. After Urara declines, Ryuichi conspires with Mashu to kidnap and to beat up Touma, but the plan goes awry when he pushes Touma in front of Mashu's car. Touma survives with a broken arm, but Urara does not know about it until later, as she breaks ties with Ryuichi. While Touma tries to recover, Akimoto learns Mashu is involved and attacks him, however, he is stabbed in the back and hospitalized as well.

Touma's arm heals in time for the real exams, and his test scores qualify him for S Shuu University, but he misses the school's deadline to enroll because of his attention to Akimoto's hospital bills. That leaves him with K Sawa and eventually Keio, both of which reject him. Frustrated with his bad luck, he smashes the windows of his middle school, but the police arrest Urara, whose student ID was found at the scene of the crime. Urara agrees to take the blame and declines her college admission. Touma's "little sister" childhood friend Momoe Shimizu visits for spring break. Touma sleeps with the big-breasted cram school receptionist Etsuko Koiwai. He encounters Kotomi Hayashibara, a twin-tailed high school student who idolizes Urara; she sleeps with Touma in order to frame him for infidelity. After the resulting fallout with Urara, Touma meets and sleeps with a shy, glasses-wearing girl named Mieko Hotta. He eventually returns to Urara, who challenges him to ascend and descend the temple stairs a hundred times before agreeing to take him back.

== Characters ==
Touma Inaba (因幡 冬馬, Inaba Tōma)
Voiced by: Mitsuaki Madono (Japanese); Martin Burke (English)
A prep school student who is struggling to get into Keio University after repeated failures. When he goes once again to take the entry exams, it is love at first sight (for him, at least) when he meets Mieko Yotsuba. When she is accepted but he is not, he decides to lie to her and says that he was accepted. He lives with his cousin, Urara Kasuga, who has feelings for him and affectionately calls him "Tonma-chan" though he is too dense and love-struck for Mieko to notice.
Urara Kasuga (春日 麗, Kasuga Urara)
Voiced by: Kyōko Hikami (Japanese); Mariela Ortiz (English)
A high school student and Touma's cousin who is in love with her dear "Tonma-chan". When she finds out that he is lying to Mieko in order to impress her, only respect and love for him prevents her from revealing Touma's secret. She keeps saying that her father is never around and is away on business when Touma keeps asking about where he is, but as he finds out later, they might be really having the apartment all to themselves. In one of the storylines, she discovers she is pregnant,^{Ch. 57} and tries to raise money by joining the escort service that Natsumi works at, however, she suffers a miscarriage when one of their clients beats her up in a hustling scheme gone wrong.^{Ch. 59-66}
Mieko Yotsuba (四葉 美咲子, Yotsuba Mieko)
Voiced by: Rumi Kasahara (Japanese); Monica Rial (English)
She is a redheaded beauty who makes it into Keio University and is the object of Touma's desire. She may not know his secret, but it turns out she has secrets of her own concerning a man who is living in Europe, with whom she is to be betrothed. She takes an interest in him and asks him to make a memory with her.^{Ch. 20} After Touma eventually reveals that he is not a Keio student, she is left with Mashu as her lover.^{Ch. 29} However, when she meets Touma later on, she is concerned that Mashu might be cheating, so she takes Touma to a love hotel.^{Ch. 61-64} and later has one more fling with him before she gets married.^{Ch. 121}
Komi Natsuki (夏樹 香美, Natsuki Kōmi)
Voiced by: Mako Hyōdō (Japanese); Kira Vincent-Davis (English)
Urara's best friend, she often advises Urara on how to deal with her love for Touma. However, her advice often just means "get him in the sack". She usually gets her advice from Cosmopolitan magazine and her mother who states that men are "nothing more than people that buy you stuff". But she looks out for Urara's well-being. She is in a sexual relationship with Mashu.^{Ch. 23-24} She later assumes a ganguro appearance, with blonde hair and a dark tan,^{Ch. 89} and gets into the "health fashion business" for a living.^{Ch. 114, 129-130}
Kouji Akimoto (秋本浩司)
Touma's best friend, who is in this third year at cram school. After discovering that Mashu and Kazama tried to kill Touma, he fights Mashu but gets stabbed in the back and is hospitalized.^{Ch. 119, 122-123} He later gets a job in construction..^{Ch. 149}
Tatsuhiko Mashu (摩周達彦)
A Keio economics student who is interested in Mieko. Upon learning from Natsuki that Touma is not a real university student, he conspires to humiliate him, and take Mieko as his own. He comes from an affluent family who thrives on one-upmanship.^{Ch. 74} He manipulates Natsuki several times to try to keep Touma from relating with Mieko.^{Ch. 23-24, 73-74, 79}
Naomi Kugenuma (鵠沼直美)
Touma's cram school teacher. She is upset that students have been focusing on love instead of studying,^{Ch. 17, 31-32} and plots to break the "happy couple" Touma and Urara apart by forcing Touma to take after-school studying. When that fails, she has her lesbian lover Megumi Yamada frame Touma of sexual harassment, getting him kicked out of school for a month and breaking his friendship with Akimoto. She reveals that after she had been spurned by a guy, she tried to burn his residence and states that she will never trust another guy. She manipulates Urara to do sexual favors for her. She later burns Touma and Urara's residence, but is consequently arrested.^{Ch. 42-53}
Megumi Yamada (山田めぐみ)
A cram school student who is Kugenuma's lesbian lover. She helps frame Touma of sexual harassment.^{Ch. 42-53}
Mizuki Akimoto (秋本美寿紀)
Natsuki's co-worker at the escort service.^{Ch. 63} She is later revealed to be Kouji's little sister and that she has leukemia. She is a second-year high school student. Her left leg was lost from cancer and was replaced with an artificial one.^{Ch. 88-89}
Ryuichi Kazama (風間隆一)
Urara's childhood friend who saves her while she is working at a hostess club. He is hired by Urara's dad to look after Urara and serve as her home tutor. Urara calls him Jinma (ジンマ)^{Ch. 98-100} It is revealed that he was sexually abused by Urara's father when he was young, and thus finds it difficult to resist his orders. He conspires to kill Touma by pushing him in front of a car driven by Mashu.^{Ch. 106-108} After Urara rejects him, he gets drunk and walks onto a street where he is hit by a truck.^{Ch. 121}
Momoe Shimizu (清水桃恵)
Touma's "little sister" childhood friend who visits Touma on her spring break. She tries to act mature, but Touma misinterprets her intentions as sexual advances. After Touma realizes she does not want that, he backs off. It is revealed that she has suffered years of sexual abuse by her real brother, but is encouraged to put an end to it after seeing Touma resist.^{Ch. 131-136}
Etsuko Koiwai (小岩井悦子)
A busty receptionist at the cram school. She has a one-night stand with Touma after her lover transfers away and breaks up with her.^{Ch. 137-139}
Kotomi Hayashiba (林葉琴美)
A high school student that wears her hair in twin tails who is attracted to Urara because she saved her from other train molesters. She wants to be a lesbian with Urara, but after learning how devoted Urara is to Touma, she sleeps with Touma in order to snap a picture of him being unfaithful.^{Ch. 140-147}
Mieko Hotta (堀田美枝子)
A glasses-wearing girl who Touma encounters at the library when she faints and then loses her phone. However, she enjoys Touma’s company, learning that they had both failed the exams. After Touma convinces her to wear contacts, she gains confidence both in school and in love.^{Ch. 152-159}

== Anime ==
The series was directed by Kunitoshi Okajima at Shaft, though studio Office AO was outsourced to for episodes 2–3, 5, 8, and 11. Nobuyuki Takeuchi and Hideo Shimosaka served as character designers and chief animation directors, Kenji Terada wrote the series composition and screenplay for each episode, and Mitsuo Hagita composed the series' music.

1. Tokyo Success
2. My Cousin is a High School Call Girl
3. Is the Fake Student a Slave of Love?
4. The Love Hotel of Temptation
5. First Time in Bed?
6. First Love in Kamakura
7. The Love Triangle
8. Mieko's Confession
9. First Kiss in the Rain
10. Bath Time for Two
11. Testing Student Syndrome
12. A Testing Student's Decision

== Other media ==
A dating sim video game for the Sega Saturn called Sakura Tsuushin: ReMaking Memories was released in 1998 by Media Group. The player assumes the role of Touma Inaba as he tries to get into Keio University while dealing with romance relationships. Many of the cut scenes were taken straight from the anime.

== Sequel ==
In February 2014, a sequel was announced called New Sakura Diaries in which a boy seeking a job in Tokyo is embraced by a girl who calls him "big brother".

== Works cited ==
- "Ch." is shortened form for chapter and refers to a chapter number of the Sakura Diaries manga.
