= Mr. Stain on Junk Alley =

Japanese animated television series

- Ga-Ra-Ku-Ta: Mr. Stain on Junk Alley
- The cover of Ga-Ra-Ku-Ta: Mr. Stain on Junk Alley DVDs released in USA

ガラクタ通りのステイン (Garakuta-dori no Sutein)
- Genre: Surreal comedy
- Anime television series
- Directed by: Ryuji Masuda
- Produced by: Shunsuke Koga
- Written by: Ryuji Masuda
- Studio: The Fool
- Licensed by: NA: Funimation
- Original network: Kids Station
- Original run: January 6, 2003 – March 25, 2003
- Episodes: 14

Ga-Ra-Ku-Ta: Mr. Stain on Junk Alley (ガラクタ通りのステイン, Garakuta-dori no Sutein), also known as simply Mr. Stain, is an animated television series created and directed by Ryuji Masuda. The producer of the show is Shunsuke Koga and the characters are designed by Wakako Masuda. The series involves surreal adventures centred on characters living in a junk-filled alley. The episodes are short, with a duration of about seven minutes, and usually start with the titular Mr. Stain finding an object. There is no spoken dialogue and only vocal grunts, with the series using its visuals to convey stories. Each episode's ending credits show the characters who appeared in the specific episode along with their names listed in English, followed by a segment of everyone dancing and having fun.

The show was animated by Koga's studio The Fool, and premiered between 10:50 p.m. and 11:30 p.m. (JST) on December 31, 2002. It was broadcast in Japan by Kids Station, beginning January 6, 2003, on Monday, Tuesday and Wednesday at 12 p.m. (JST). It was also aired in Brazil and Latin America by Cartoon Network (as a part of their Adult Swim block). The series received generally positive reviews from critics. A DVD release of the show was also launched by Funimation for the US and Canada region. Funimation also included episodes of Mr. Stain on many of its other DVD releases.

== Characters ==
Beautiful Lifa, from inside the mirror, beckoning to Handsome Stain (not in picture) at the end of episode fourteen

Mr. Stain lives in a junk-filled alley and comes across objects in his searches. These objects seem ordinary at first but soon prove to be otherwise, resulting in awkward situations. He befriends a large feline, named Palvan, who almost always does not agree with Stain on the best use of a found item. Their arguments become extremely violent with one of them getting hurt, but things turn out well at the end. Both characters are very selfish but their tender side can also be seen. Mr. Stain is the only character who appears in all the episodes; Palvan is not in episodes four and ten. The rest of the characters appear occasionally in important roles, but can be seen in other episodes.

The characters in the series are an odd bunch with names that suggest their fate, role or physique: Eaten is a fish that is consumed, Rings is a lizard that uses rings as an accessory around its neck, Pylon is a crab that uses a pylon as headgear, and Policeman is an officer of the law who comes to the alley on his rounds. Different minor characters, such as Squeezed dog and Masked monkey, appear in the series as inhabitants of "Junk Alley" besides Mr. Stain and Palvan. Others like Lost kitten and Stephanie, a young girl, accidentally enter the alley and are helped to find a way out. There is an abandoned baby and a pianist called Lifa, with whom Stain falls in love but must fight his alter-ego, Handsome Stain from the mirror world, for her affection.

== Synopsis ==
Mr. Stain is a street-dwelling vagabond who uncovers the mysterious and bizarre world of Junk Alley. Objects in the alley have magically come to life. Stain makes friends and along with them has adventures within the alley. The episodes usually start with him finding an odd object and an adventure ensues. The episodes are comedic with some thought-provoking scenes.

In episode eight Mr. Stain tries to help the robot to fly like a bird by using two rockets as a jet-pack.

One touching episode is Heavenly Bird, where Stain discovers a bird in a cage and wants to eat it. After a riotous chase through the alley while he tries to capture the animal, Stain realizes that the bird is sad and dying. It just wants to see its tropical homeland. Stain works through the night to build a cardboard model of the bird's homeland and when the Heavenly Bird sees it, he thinks he's home and dies. Another episode, titled Toy Robot, is about a remote controlled toy that decides that it no longer wants to be a servant, but wants to fly like the birds it sees. Stain, being helpful, comes up with different ways of making the robot fly, with comically tragic results. The last episode is an epilogue to the series and is for half an hour. The story revolves around Stain who sees a woman living in a high rise apartment and immediately falls in love with her. After a few comic attempts to get to her, all of which fail, he accidentally switches places with the attractive Handsome Stain from his mirror. This Stain has no problems getting to the woman and seducing her.

== Episodes ==
No.	Title	Duration
1	"Egg" "Tamago" (卵)	6:59
Mr. Stain finds a uniquely colored egg and decides to care for it. Palvan, on the other hand, wants to eat the egg and Stain is forced to violently fight him off. During the night, the egg hatches into a seemingly harmless fish. But, when the fish shows its carnivorous nature, the situation turns for the worse.
2	"Refrigerator" "Reizouko" (冷蔵庫)	6:59
Palvan finds a refrigerator and keeps the possession to himself, preventing Stain and Rings from approaching it. But he cannot open the door and eventually teams up with Stain and Rings, beginning a series of disturbing attempts to open it.
3	"Portrait" "Shōzōga" (肖像画)	6:59
Stain finds a portrait of a beautiful woman and falls in love with it. Enthralled by the painting, he does not move, drink or eat anything. Palvan thinks that he has a perfect cure for Stain's condition, but the feline's good intentions have disastrous consequences.
4	"Heavenly Bird" "Gokurakutori" (極楽鳥)	7:59
Stain stumbles upon an exotic bird with rainbow feathers and a gift to dance. He initially thinks of it as his next meal, but soon realises it is lonely and is about to die. As an act of kindness he replicates the bird's paradise island.
5	"Cassette Tape" "Kasettotēpu" (カセットテープ)	6:59
Stain and Palvan obtain a mystical cassette tape and use it, along with other spare junk to construct a robot. The robot's only desire is to dance to the tune of the tape and it uses Palvan and Stain as non-stop dancing partners. Unable to bear the dancing robot, the two must fix the situation before the robot discovers its ability to display anger.
6	"Magic Crayons" "Kureyon" (クレヨン)	6:59
Stain discovers a box of crayons that appear normal, until they bring all that is drawn with them to life. Realizing the possibilities, Stain and Palvan start on a humorous adventure of drawing things into existence, but this quickly goes out of hand.
7	"Binoculars" "Sōgankyō" (双眼鏡)	6:59
Mr. Stain finds a pair of binoculars and looks from a distance to see Palvan's softer side. It turns out that the cat is secretly raising and nurturing a tiny kitten. Stain continues to observe this interesting event, when a new factor is introduced that could change Stain and Palvan's future.
8	"Toy Robot" "Rimokonrobotto" (リモコンロボット)	6:59
Mr. Stain finds a remote-controlled robot, that refuses to obey the remote. When Stain tries to figure out the robot's reason for rebelling he discovers that the robot is tired of being ordered around and wants to be free like a bird. Stain offers his help with catastrophic results.
9	"Woolen Yarn" "Keito" (毛糸)	7:59
Mr. Stain picks up a thread of wool that was once knitted into a magical mitten which came to life and helped a lost girl find her way out of Junk alley.
10	"Seed" "Shushi" (種子)	6:59
Stain plants a seed which rapidly grows into a beautiful flower. At night he fantasizes about it becoming a beautiful woman and dancing with her.
11	"Clay" "Nendo" (粘土)	7:59
Stain comes across some clay and fashions it into a face of himself, which acts with a mind of its own and takes over Palvan to form a living replica of Mr. Stain.
12	"Fishing Rod" "Tsurizao" (釣り竿)	6:59
Mr. Stain and Palvan find a fishing rod, decide to go fishing in the alley's fountain, and end up catching a big fish. After they eat the fish, Stain discovers the babies of the fish yearning for their father. Stain takes pity on the fish and decides to raise them with outlandish results.
13	"Human" "Ningen" (人間)	7:59
Mr. Stain finds an abandoned baby in Junk-Alley's garbage dump. In order to feed the baby he decides to steal milk and a baby bottle, which incites a police officer to come after him. Refusing to bend to the law, Stain faces dire consequences and sets off a series of twists that lead to a struggle between life and death.
14	"Epilogue (or Harmonica)" "Hāmonika" (ハーモニカ)	28:00
Stain, while playing his harmonica, sees a beautiful woman across the alley and immediately falls in love with her. However, a twisted set of events begin to unfold that forces Stain to compete for her attention with his alter ego, Handsome Stain.

== DVD release ==
=== Contents ===
The DVDs of Mr. Stain were originally released in Region 2 on March 3 of 2003 to May 28 of 2004, then it was released in Region 1 on March 26 of 2006. The Japanese DVDs came in 3 separate volumes and an extra Epilouge DVD while The American DVDs come in a standard amaray DVD case that contains a two-disc set and have a paper insert listing other Funimation releases. In addition to the fourteen episodes of Mr. Stain, all of the DVDs have nearly two hours of bonus material. The show also has a picture book that was released in 2007.

Japanese and American DVD extras	Japanese DVD only extras	American DVD only extras
Interview With Director Ryuji Masuda, Part 1; Interview With Director Ryuji Masuda, Part 2; Interview With Director Ryuji Masuda, Part 3; Interview With Producer Sunsuke Koga, Part 1; Interview With Producer Sunsuke Koga, Part 2; Production Process Explanation With CGI Director Daisuke Suzuki; Interview With Meyna Co; Staff Interviews; Character Profiles; TV Spots; Mr. Stain on Junk Alley Special; Junk Alley Goes to Pusan; Staff Comedy #1; Staff Comedy #2; CGI Shorts: Drawing; CGI Shorts: Stain vs. Palvan – Showdown; CGI Shorts: Her Scheme; CGI Shorts: Creator; CGI Shorts: Giant Cat in Tokyo	"Mr. Stain on Junk Avenue" Pilot test; Palvan CG animation test; Unaired version of the "Egg" episode; Concept art for Stain (vol 1), Palvan (vol 2), and the Alleyway (vol 3)	Trailers for other anime

== Music ==
The score was done by Meyna Co. (Formed by the music making duo Yoko Kumagai and Hidehiko Urayama) while the end music was done by HALCALI.

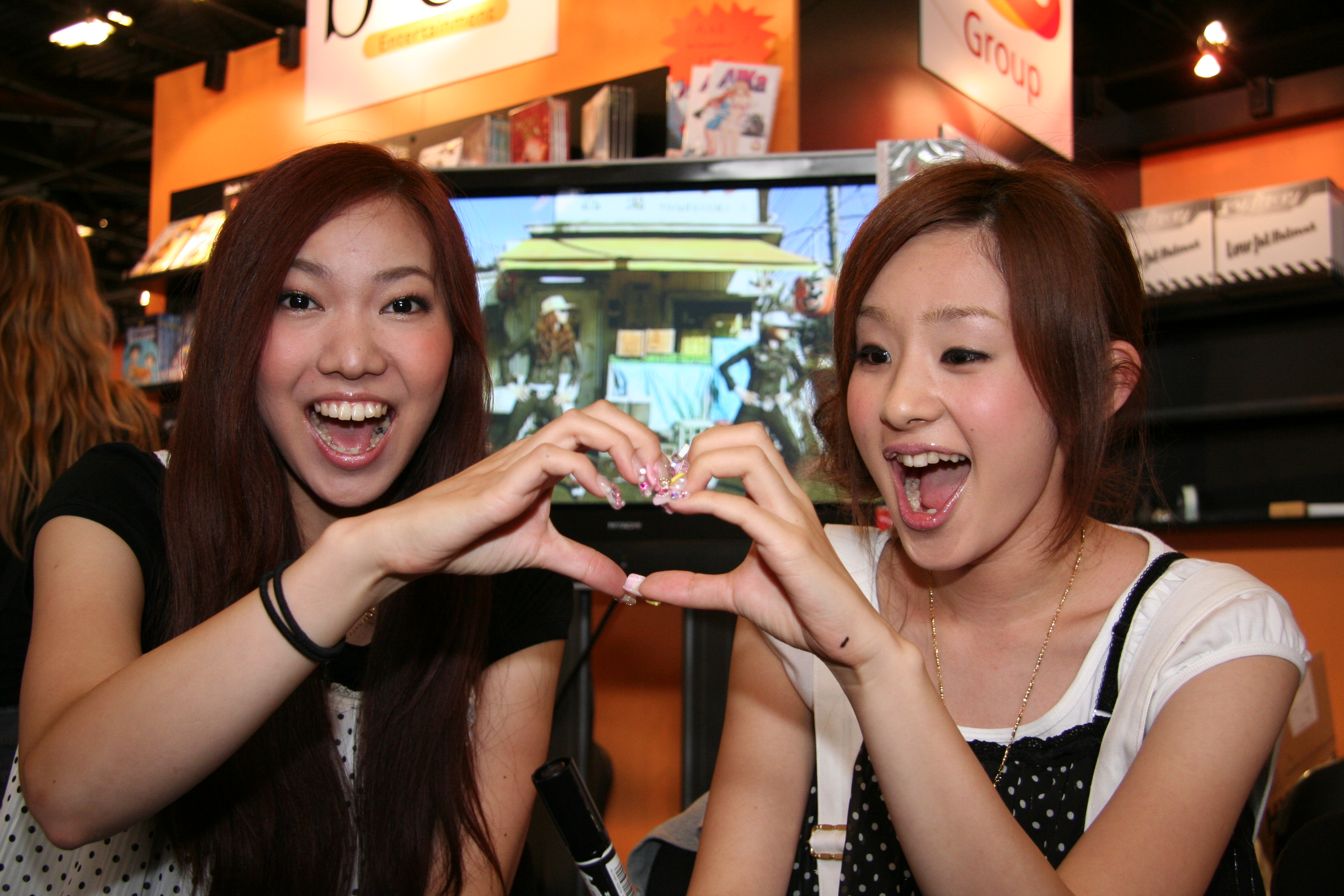
HALCALI, Haruka (left) and Yukari (right), at Japan Expo, 2007

Opening Themes
#	Transcription/Translation	Performed by	Episodes
1	"Opening Theme"	Meyna Co.	One to Fourteen

Ending themes
#	Transcription/Translation	Performed by	Episodes
1	"Tandem"	HALCALI	One to Thirteen
2	"Giri Giri Surf-Rider"	HALCALI	Fourteen

== Reception ==
=== Reviews ===
The series received a positive response from reviewers. Reviewers generally felt that the show could be watched by any viewer and praised the "infectious" and "foot-tapping" music of the end credits. John Sinnott of DVDtalk compared it to Charlie Chaplin, commenting that it is "very funny and filled with well thought out slapstick, calling it "a very fun and touching show and one of the better anime sets to be released so far this year. Otaku fans of well crafted comedy alike should give this series a look." He was impressed by the lack of dialogue and felt the show's bittersweet moments "gives it heart", his opinion was more mixed on the fourteenth episode which, he felt, "did drag a bit."

Jeremy Mullin from IGN called the show "weird", but thought that the weirdness made the show appealing, especially the "Looney Tunes"-like way in which it is done. Stating, "You usually get a good laugh at the antics of Mr. Stain and his friends, but sometimes things get dramatic in a thought-provoking way that gets to you. Some moments are particularly disturbing.". He thought the series would be "perfect for a nice break from reality when you want some laughs with the occasional moral message" and suggested that even non-anime fans could enjoy it.

Michael Bartholow of Advanced Media Networks called the show "wacky, bizarre and humorous with touching moments that are thought provoking". Also comparing it to the Looney Tunes series, specifically praising its choice to be visually oriented rather than relying on conventional dialogue.

=== Overall ratings ===
- Advanced Media Network (Anime) 9.1 out of 10
- IGN 7.0 out of 10.

=== Awards and international recognition ===
- Received Excellent Animation Award in Cultural Affair Agencies'Media Art Festival.
- Specially invited to the "Pusan International Film Festival" in Korea.
- Officially invited to "Melbourne International Film Festival" in Australia (2004).
