= List of The Parkers episodes =

The Parkers is an American television sitcom, created by Ralph Farquhar, Sara V. Finney and Vida Spears, and produced by Big Ticket Television for UPN. A spin-off from Moesha, the series stars Mo'Nique and Countess Vaughn as Nikki and Kim Parker, a mother and daughter, who incidentally begin to attend Santa Monica College. It also features Mari Morrow, Jenna von Oÿ, Ken L., Yvette Wilson and Dorien Wilson.

During the course of the series, 110 episodes of The Parkers aired over five seasons, between August 30, 1999, and May 10, 2004.

== Series overview ==
Season	Episodes	Originally released		Viewers (millions)
Season	Episodes	First released	Last released	Viewers (millions)
1	22	August 30, 1999	May 22, 2000	2.7
2	22	September 4, 2000	May 14, 2001	3.7
3	22	September 10, 2001	May 20, 2002	4.4
4	25	September 23, 2002	May 19, 2003	3.73
5	19	September 15, 2003	May 10, 2004	3.33

== Episodes ==
=== Season 1 (1999–2000) ===
No. overall	No. in season	Title	Directed by	Written by	Original release date	Prod. code	U.S. viewers (millions)
1	1	"Grape Nuts"	Jeff Melman	Story by : Sherri McGee; Teleplay by : Bill Boulware	August 30, 1999	6699-002	4.49
Nikki decides to pledge Alpha, Alpha, Alpha, the same sorority as her daughter Kim during rush week, much to Kim's dismay. But before they can become "Triple's A's," they'll have to settle for being "grapes," lowly pledges who won't be allowed in until they can prove their worth.
2	2	"Scammed Straight"	Jeff Melman	Gary M. Goodrich	September 6, 1999	6699-001	3.63
Looking for extra income to help pay their college expenses, Kim and Nikki take jobs at a psychic hotline, and wind up being their star employees. But the thrill of making fast cash quickly fades, however when they meet one of their regular callers and see what the hotline has really done for her. Meanwhile, Nikki tries to score points with Professor Oglevee by dog sitting, unaware of his dog's bizarre condition.
3	3	"Daddy's Girl"	Matthew Diamond	T. Smith III & James Earl West II	September 13, 1999	6699-004	4.44
When Nikki complains about Kim's father, Mel, allowing Kim to do what she wants, Kim decides to move out of the house and live with her dad. Guest Star: Sheryl Lee Ralph as Dee Mitchell
4	4	"Taking Tae-Bo with My Beau"	Matthew Diamond	Calvin Brown, Jr.	September 20, 1999	6699-005	3.81
Desiree, Nikki, and Kim sign up for a Tae-Bo class instructed by Billy Blanks. Nikki accidentally punches Professor Oglevee out-cold and decides to take care of him. They share an unusual bond, but it becomes short-lived when Professor Oglevee's stuck up girlfriend, Veronica Cooper, insists that she cares for her man.
5	5	"The Boomerang Effect"	Jeff Melman	Felicia D. Henderson	September 27, 1999	6699-003	3.44
In order to make extra money, Kim, Nikki, Steve, and Anthony try to put together a calendar of Santa Monica College "hottest hunks." While Anthony has a crush on Kim, she ignores him until Nikki gives him a makeover. Guest Star: Rich Piana as bodybuilder (uncredited)
6	6	"Three's a Shag"	Scott Baio	Andrea Allen-Wiley	October 4, 1999	6699-006	3.90
Kim's old friend Hakeem Campbell asks Kim to an "Austin Powers" party, but she declines, saying her crush on him was just a high school thing. However, she gets upset when he decides to go with Stevie instead. Meanwhile, Nikki is romanced by a 21-year-old student. Guest Star: Lamont Bentley as Hakeem Campbell
7	7	"Kimberlale"	Tony Singletary	Nguyen Orange & Tracey Rice	October 18, 1999	6699-007	4.48
After Kim unveils her new designs at a sorority fashion show, her creations catch the eye of Professor Oglevee's mother, Camille, who owns a chain of boutiques. Kim is thrilled when Camille places a huge order for one of her designs, but delivering the goods in time might mean putting college on hold, and incurring the wrath of Nikki. Guest Stars: Shar Jackson as Niecy Jackson, Marcus T. Paulk as Myles Mitchell, Veronica Redd as Camille Oglevee
8	8	"Quarantine"	Tony Singletary	Michelle Listenbee Brown	November 1, 1999	6699-008	4.47
Nikki and Kim's dream vacation in Mexico turns into a nightmare after they're kicked out of the country, and then exposed to a potentially deadly virus on the plane ride home and quarantined. Kim and Nikki go crazy under house arrest, as does Professor Oglevee when he unwittingly exposes himself to the virus by entering their house.
9	9	"And the Band Plays On"	Erma Elzy-Jones	Stacey Lyn Evans	November 8, 1999	6699-009	3.70
"T", Kim and Stevie dream of stardom when they form a music group and then learn that the record company exec at the career fair is an old friend of Nikki's
10	10	"Betting on Love"	Linda Day	Gary M. Goodrich	November 15, 1999	6699-010	3.66
Nikki' ex-fiancé walks back into her life with a promise to give up his gambling habit and a marriage proposal.
11	11	"It's a Family Affair"	Linda Day	Andrea Wiley	November 22, 1999	6699-011	4.04
Nikki's haughty sister and her daughter come for Thanksgiving dinner and she bosses Nikki around which Nikki uncharacteristically endures.
12	12	"Bad to the Bone"	Ken Whittingham	Bill Boulware	January 3, 2000	6699-012	4.38
Nikki gets involved in Professor Oglevee's mentor program, acting as a big sister for a 12-year-old girl named Shaquilla who's a handful. Guest Star: Kyla Pratt as Shaquilla
13	13	"Big Is Beautiful"	Tony Singletary	Calvin Brown, Jr.	January 24, 2000	6699-013	4.43
Kim's new boyfriend, Garland, scores big laughs at a comedy laugh-off. When Garland starts using fat jokes as his main act, Nikki and others get offended. But Nikki makes a comeback by offending Garland with skinny jokes. Guest Star: Nick Cannon, Musical Guest Star: So Plush
14	14	"Love is a Royal Pain"	Tony Singletary	Michelle Listenbee Brown	February 7, 2000	6699-015	5.08
At her high school reunion, Nikki regretfully meets an old flame who cheated on her, and introduces him to Kim whom he starts dating. Musical Guest Star: Teena Marie; Guest Star: Tami Roman as Dina
15	15	"Funny, Funny Valentine"	Tony Singletary	Stacey Lyn Evans	February 14, 2000	6699-016	4.31
Professor Oglevee plans to pop the question to Veronica on Valentine's Day, and questions hang in the air when Nikki and her ex start seeing each other again. Meanwhile, Kim, Stevie and the other members of the "Triple A" try to get dates for Valentine's Day with the singing group Ideal, but they must first cancel their dates with T and his frat brothers. Musical Guest Star: Ideal
16	16	"Trading Places"	Tony Singletary	Nguyen Orange & Tracey Rice	February 21, 2000	6699-014	4.14
Professor Oglevee has his twin brothers, Sylvester, take his place at a school charity auction, where Sly romances a very confused Nikki. Meanwhile, Kim and Stevie try to ditch their dates from the charity auction. Guest Star: Kenan Thompson
17	17	"A Simple Plan"	Erma Elzy-Jones	Sarah Fitzgerald	March 20, 2000	6699-017	4.11
After Nikki and Kim fail to convince Frank to give them a large discount on a Saturn, they buy a car at a police auction. They later find $250,000 in its tire, but Nikki's joy turns to fear when a mysterious man comes looking for a car. Guest Star: William Allen Young as Frank Mitchell
18	18	"It's a Spring Bling Thing"	Henry Chan	Gary M. Goodrich	April 10, 2000	6699-020	3.96
Kim's band "Freestyle Unity", is booked for a spring-break concert in Palm Springs, but not without complications. Meanwhile, Nikki's dream of being alone with Professor Oglevee turns into a nightmare for him after he and Veronica have a fight and she leaves with Andell to go to Palm Springs. Musical Guest Stars: Warren G and Lil Zane
19	19	"Moving on Out"	Jeff Melman	Dornita R. LeCourt	May 1, 2000	6699-018	3.22
Feeling the need to be independent, Kim moves in an apartment with Stevie. But Nikki and Stevie's mom, Sophia Van Lowe, can't seem to let go. Kim and Stevie have a housewarming party and Nikki and Sophia decide to crash the party, after they find out that they weren't invited. Meanwhile, T falls for the girls' apartment manager, Rachel, but he later learns that she once was a man.
20	20	"Unforgiven"	Chip Hurd	Andrea Allen-Wiley	May 8, 2000	6699-019	3.84
Nikki's parents visit when they come to renew their wedding vows. But her dad renews old tensions regarding Nikki's pregnancy at a young age.
21	21	"Since I Lost My Baby"	Tony Singletary	Calvin Brown, Jr.	May 15, 2000	6699-022	4.17
Nikki is thrilled to learn that Professor Oglevee and Veronica have finally ended their relationship. She throws a party to celebrate the news. When Professor Oglevee shows up at the party with his new girlfriend, Angela, Nikki and Veronica team up to ruin Stanley's relationship. But when they learn that Angela used to be involved with another woman, they try to reunite Angela with her ex-lover.
22	22	"Get Me to the Church on Time"	Ken Whittingham	Bill Boulware	May 22, 2000	6699-021	4.62
Jerel receives a job offer in Paris. Kim questions their relationship and decides that they should get married. Jerel says he isn't ready to take the next step. Meanwhile, Veronica becomes very jealous when Nikki is always unexpectedly hanging around Professor Oglevee. Jerel shows up the next day and finally proposes to Kim. She accepts and they decide to elope in Las Vegas. Professor Oglevee reluctantly goes out on a date with Nikki, but it becomes interrupted by the news that Kim and Jerel getting married. They flee to Las Vegas to stop the wedding, but they realize it may be too late.

=== Season 2 (2000–01) ===
No. overall	No. in season	Title	Directed by	Written by	Original release date	Prod. code	U.S. viewers (millions)
23	1	"Wedding Bell Blues"	Tony Singletary	Bill Boulware	September 4, 2000	6600-023	5.07
While Nikki barges in to stop the wedding, she realizes she's in the wrong one. While check other wedding chapels for Kim and Jerel, she encounters another couple about to get married. Nikki and the professor act as witnesses, but while the ceremony goes on, Nikki interrupts, saying why they shouldn't get married. She ends up breaking them apart. She and the professor get tired, so they stay at a hotel. Unfortunately for the professor, he has to share the bed with Nikki. While Nikki is asleep, she has a dream of Kim's future if she marries Jerel. In it, Kim has several kids and doesn't do any work. Stevie is a bailiff, T is homeless, and Jerel is in prison. The professor is Nikki's husband and Andell has her own husband. When Jerel gets out of prison, he takes Kim with him and leaves all of their kids at Nikki's. Nikki in the dream gets angry at this, so she holds him in a headlock till the end of the dream. After that, she wakes up to holding the professor in a headlock. Then, they both hear noises coming from the next room. When the professor bangs on the wall, the person from next room comes over to their room, revealing himself to be Jerel. Kim comes over after that, revealing that she is the new Mrs. Jerel Goodrich. The scene ends with Nikki disappointed. The last scene was the professor dreaming of marrying Veronica. While he was about to kiss her, the bride reveals herself to be Nikki. The professor then wakes up with a shriek.
24	2	"Breaking Up Is Hard to Do"	Tony Singletary	Sara V. Finney	September 11, 2000	6600-024	5.66
While newlyweds Jerel and Kim prepare to leave for Paris, Jerel's mom, Clarise, shows up with a surprise that could threaten their marriage. Meanwhile, Professor Oglevee has a falling out with Veronica. So he takes T's advice to date another woman but it turns out he only wants Veronica. Guest Star: Adele Givens
25	3	"The Oddest Couple"	Erma Elzy-Jones	Gary M. Goodrich	September 18, 2000	6600-026	4.49
Kim is looking for a new roommate. While searching, she takes a man, Bradley, who doesn't do much for her instead of a man who would do a lot for her. While waiting for him to ask her out, she has to do a lot of work for him. Later, the professor waits for Veronica to come over. He believes that his plan to make her jealous after they broke up has worked. Unfortunately for him, she believes that he has moved on and she gets engaged to another man in one week. This gets the professor very depressed. In fact, when Nikki comes over to his apartment, he doesn't even notice. She decides to take advantage of him; she moves in all of her furniture into his house. Kim is still trying to get Bradley to ask her out. When he holds a bachelor party there, he has a stripper over. Kim notices that the stripper actually is a man, meaning that Bradley is gay. Kim decides to kick him out after he doesn't pay the rent, acts like a slob, and doesn't ask her out. Nikki and the professor go out on a date where they have dinner and watch a show. The show is about a man and a couple of women who date the man. Nikki interrupts the show several times, but by the end, the professor does. He gives the woman in the act a speech about what Veronica has done to him after she got engaged. He talks to her as if he were talking to Veronica, which makes him feel better. He then realizes he's on a date with Nikki, so he kicks her out of his apartment and becomes conscious again. Later, Nikki learns that Bradley moved out of Kim's apartment. Kim says she doesn't have a roommate anymore, but surprise, surprise!
26	4	"Reunited"	Tony Singletary	Andrea Wiley	September 25, 2000	6600-025	4.78
Kim decides to let Nikki move in with her. While walking in one day, she notices that Nikki got rid of all her stuff. Her friends think that she should confront Nikki, but she's too afraid to. Another night, while walking in, she finds out that Nikki ate all her ice cream. She gets mad at that point, but Nikki holds her ground. They decide to split the apartment in half, with one person on each side. It isn't working out for either side, since the phone is on Kim's side, but it's plugged in on Nikki's side. Meanwhile, the professor holds a tenant meeting for a case of burglaries in the building. He asks for a partner in his burglar patrol. Nikki volunteers, but he chooses someone named Vince. Nikki tries to trick him into giving him a dinner, but that plan fails. Later, while Nikki and Kim are still fighting over the fact that they have a split living room, they hear a burglar coming in. They hide out in the balcony. Nikki decides to shimmy down a garden hose to get down to the professor's apartment, but he is of no help. They go in to confront the burglar. While Kim fakes an injury, Nikki gives the burglar a kick and knocks him out. Nikki and Kim then unmask the villain a la Scooby Doo, they find out it is Vince, the man who is supposed to be patrolling with the professor. Nikki and Kim are considered heroes. Guest Stars: Boyz II Men
27	5	"J.C. Bowl"	Erma Elzy-Jones	Rushion McDonald	October 2, 2000	6600-027	4.02
Nikki helps Professor Oglevee assemble a team for an academic competition.
28	6	"Whassup with Heyyy?"	Ken Whittingham	Sarah Fitzgerald	October 9, 2000	6600-028	4.58
Inspired by the Whassup Guys at an Entrepreneur convention, Nikki, Kim, Stevie and T go into the shirt business, but, when they can't agree on a slogan, T breaks off on his own called "Heyyy". The girls struggle to sell more than one of their "Dang Momma" t-shirts and T's business proves to be a success. Then Nikki realizes she came up with T's slogan, decides to take him to court. Guest Star: Haywood Nelson
29	7	"Scary Kim"	Ken Whittingham	Nguyen Orange & Tracey Rice	October 30, 2000	62011-029	4.45
Kim plays several pranks on Nikki and her friends on Halloween as she gets ready to celebrate her birthday. Kim's best friend, Moesha Mitchell, stops by to receive her Cinderella costume that Kim designed for her. But when a stranger appears at her door and leaves a threatening note, she assumes someone's out to kill her. Later, things get spooky and mysteriously when everyone starts disappearing. As Nikki, Kim and Professor Oglevee search for everyone's whereabouts, they surprise Kim by presenting her scare as a joke. Guest Stars: Brandy Norwood as Moesha, Shar Jackson as Niecey, and Lamont Bentley as Hakeem Note: This episode would be considered a crossover of Moesha and The Parkers.
30	8	"Election 2000"	Tony Singletary	Stacey Lyn Evans	November 6, 2000	62011-030	3.73
After hearing that haughty Regina is running for student-body president, Kim decides to run. But after an interview for the school newspaper ends with Nikki answering all of Kim's intended questions, Kim and Nikki have a disagreement; leading to Nikki entering the race and competing with Kim and Regina.
31	9	"Heir Today, Gone Tomorrow"	Tony Singletary	Michelle Listenbee Brown	November 13, 2000	62011-031	3.91
As she struggles to come up with an idea to write about for her creative writing class, Kim fantasizes about a world of wealth, lies and deceit based on the 1980s soap Dallas. In the end, Nikki disapproves of Kim's plagiarism so Kim decides to go with Star Trek.
32	10	"Turkey Day Blues"	Henry Chan	Dornita R. LeCount	November 20, 2000	62011-032	4.33
A clash between Nikki and Kim over the onions in the stuffing leaves Kim out on the street trying to find a meal on her own. She meets a homeless woman named Wilma McCoy and later they show up at a homeless shelter where Nikki and the gang are serving their Thanksgiving dinner.
33	11	"Cheers"	William Allen Young	Daryl G. Nickens	December 11, 2000	62011-033	4.27
Nikki tries out for the cheerleading squad and is rejected by Regina and the other members because of her less-than-perfect figure. Kim quits the team, too. Later, both Nikki and Kim fight back by forming a squad of their own. Meanwhile, Professor Oglevee tries to act young to impress a young lady. But when she's not interested, she decides to hook him up with her mother.
34	12	"Mama, I Want to Sing"	Chip Hurd	Andrea Wiley	January 15, 2001	62011-038	3.36
The new Reverend at Nikki's church appoints her the new choir director for an upcoming concert. Nikki also thinks that Kim should join the choir as a soloist. But when Kim backs out on an important rehearsal, Nikki kicks her out of the choir and decides that she'll take over as the new soloist. (But she can't sing.) Later, Reverend Wright has been spending a lot of time with Nikki, which leads Nikki to believe that the Reverend is interested in her. When he shows up the next day, he announces to Nikki (who believes he's about to propose to her) that he wants Kim to rejoin the choir for the concert. Relieved, Nikki lets Kim back in the choir.
35	13	"Field of Dreams"	Gerren Keith	Rushion McDonald	February 5, 2001	62011-036	3.89
For an African-American culture festival, Nikki decides to pay tribute to her great-uncle, a former Negro league baseball player, but she is shocked to learn that her great-uncle was an ex-con. Meanwhile, Kim and Stevie try to live without the convenience of African-American inventions.
36	14	"Blind Date Mistake"	Tony Singletary	Gary M. Goodrich	February 12, 2001	62011-035	4.10
Nikki and Kim go on a blind date with a father-son duo named Ernest and Dwayne Orange when they appear on an episode of the TV show "Blind Date" hosted by Roger Lodge himself. Kim's date, Dwayne, seems to be perfect for her, but Nikki's date, Ernest, is a little too pushy, which quickly irritates Nikki.
37	15	"Who's Your Mama?"	Tony Singletary	Gary M. Goodrich	February 19, 2001	62011-037	3.95
A young woman named Samantha Mc Gee claims that she and Kim were switched at birth, and that she is Nikki's real daughter . Meanwhile, Professor Oglevee enlists the help of Stevie and Tee to clean up his messy apartment, but they accidentally dispose of the ashes in the urn which is the remains of Stanley's deceased uncle.
38	16	"Hands Off, Grandma"	Dianah Wynter	Bill Boulware	February 26, 2001	62011-034	3.69
Nikki's grandmother, Evelyn Smith, comes to visit and causes friction with Nikki when she tries to seduce Professor Oglevee. Guest Star: Isabel Sanford
39	17	"Single Black Female"	Sheryl Lee Ralph	Stacey Lyn Evans	March 5, 2001	62011-039	3.48
A new friend named Elaine in Nikki's life threatens the bond between her and Andell, who has a feeling that something is amiss with Nikki's pal. Meanwhile, Kim tries to give up solid foods for two weeks.
40	18	"Kim Who?"	Tony Singletary	Stacey L. McClain-Fields	March 12, 2001	62011-042	3.58
When Kim rides T's scooter without a helmet, she becomes injured and loses her memory. Everyone, including her dad, Mel, tries to help Kim recall past memories in hopes of gaining her memory back.
41	19	"In Sickness and in Health"	Tony Singletary	Dornita R. LeCount	March 19, 2001	62011-041	3.84
Kim, Stevie and T make a music video for their music band, Freestyle Unity, for MTV to air it on their weekly music series. But due to the video's graphic content and since they never received permission to shoot the video on campus, they face getting kicked out of SMC and the banishment to air their video on MTV. But the school decides to give each of them community service arrangements in order to stay in school. Plus, Professor Oglevee has surgery but doesn't have any peace and quiet when Nikki visits him at the hospital. Professor then is ready to go to surgery, but passes out and is already taken. Nikki immediately disguises herself as the doctor to go check in on the Professor's surgery. She came back being mixed into a triple bypass surgery. But found Professor in good calm hands. Then he's taken again into a triple bypass surgery, which Nikki accidentally left on the table from another client. Nikki finds out about the incident and immediately shares the Professors blood in order for him to be fine and back to normal again. Guest Star: Teck Holmes
42	20	"Et Tu Andell?"	Erma Elzy-Jones	Michael Ajakwe Jr.	April 30, 2001	62011-040	3.17
The gang hits a local salsa club to help Nikki relieve some stress, but the outing winds up having the opposite effect when she sees Professor Oglevee with the school's new dean of students Toni Ross. Stanley runs into an old friend named Kenny Davis who becomes attracted to Nikki, but Nikki rejects all of his advances. Later, she becomes bothered by Andell's new relationship with Mel.
43	21	"Love and Hisses"	Tony Singletary	Michelle Listenbee Brown	May 7, 2001	62011-043	3.18
Professor Oglevee believes that Nikki ruined his date with Toni. He tries to patch things up with Toni by asking her out to dinner again. Kenny, Stanley's friend and the man from the salsa club that Nikki rejected, tells Stanley that he wants another chance with her. Later, Nikki reluctantly agrees to go out on a date with Kenny in the hopes of making Professor Oglevee jealous. As their plan works, Stanley advises Nikki that Kenny is playing with her emotions just to get her in bed and reveals his scheme for her to back off. Hurt, Nikki decides to leave both Professor Oglevee and Kenny alone. Andell thinks that Nikki should give Kenny another chance. Meanwhile, Kim receives a letter from her old high school boyfriend Michael and decides to rekindle their romance. Kim and Michael make up for lost time. But when Michael is always leaving so suddenly, Kim suspects that he's cheating on her. Later, she, T and Stevie learn that he has been seeing a girl named Alisa. When Kim goes to confront him about Alisa, she is shocked to learn that Alisa is the name of his baby daughter...
44	22	"Love the One You're With"	Tony Singletary	Bill Boulware	May 14, 2001	62011-044	3.57
After meeting Michael's daughter Alisa, Kim agrees to help Michael care for her by looking after Alisa. Over Professor Oglevee, Nikki decides to resume her relationship with Kenny after he extends his forgiveness to her. With Nikki on his mind, Stanley visits a therapist who informs him that he may be falling in love with Nikki. While waiting for Michael to return from work, Kim receives news that there was an oil-rig explosion and Michael may or may not have made it out on time; leaving Kim to care for Alisa.

=== Season 3 (2001–02) ===
No. overall	No. in season	Title	Directed by	Written by	Original release date	Prod. code	U.S. viewers (millions)
45	1	"Baby Girl"	Tony Singletary	Bill Boulware	September 10, 2001	62011-045	5.36
With Michael dead in the aftermath of the oil-rig fire, it falls to Kim to care for his infant daughter Alisa, a job she's more than eager to do. But Nikki thinks the task calls for more maturity. She contacts Alisa's birth mother to come for her child---alienating her own daughter in the process. Meanwhile, Professor Oglevee tries to disprove his therapist's assertion that he's in love with Nikki by trying to rekindle a romance with Toni.
46	2	"Crazy Love"	Tony Singletary	Bill Boulware	September 17, 2001	62011-046	4.53
Professor Oglevee enlists the help- and vocal stylings- of R&B superstar Brian McKnight in his attempt to woo Nikki away from her new love, Kenny. But she turns a deaf ear to his mating call, forcing Stanley to resort to drastic measures to put an end to Nikki and Kenny's budding romance. Meanwhile, Kim babysits T's rambunctious cousins, but has a hard time.
47	3	"Not So Super, Supers"	Ken Whittingham	Gary M. Goodrich	September 24, 2001	62011-047	4.57
When the apartment building tenants vote to fire the nosy superintendent Aldo, mechanically challenged Nikki and Kim elect themselves superintendents in exchange for free rent. But a series of mishaps and complaints from the tenants lead them to reconsider whether their new careers are so super after all. Also, Professor Oglevee has eyes for a new tenant, which does not go over well with Nikki.
48	4	"Nobody's Fool"	Ken Whittingham	Dornita R. LeCount	October 1, 2001	62011-048	4.91
Nikki discovers an unsavory side of Lady Egyptian that leads her to quit her job. While attempting to create her own beauty line, she winds up cooking herself up a tasty new career. Meanwhile, unbeknownst to Professor Oglevee and T, they have something in common.
49	5	"A Knockout Times Two"	Tony Singletary	Sarah Fitzgerald	October 8, 2001	62011-049	4.55
All bets are off as Nikki steps into the ring and goes toe-to-toe in a battle for Professor Oglevee. Meanwhile, Kim finds her soulmate and intellectual equal at ringside. Guest Star: Tasha Smith as Rachel Jones
50	6	"Baby, You've Got to Go"	Tony Singletary	Stacey McClain	October 15, 2001	62011-050	4.96
Kim and her new boyfriend, Aaron, reconcile and agree to a living arrangement that forces Nikki to move in with Andell.
51	7	"Mummy's the Word"	Tony Singletary	Rushion McDonald	October 29, 2001	62011-051	5.12
Halloween approaches and Kim's excited because her birthday is right around the corner. Believing that her friends are throwing her a surprise birthday party, Kim learns that T and Stevie are not throwing her a party, but instead are looking forward to renting out a house to record a demo tape. Unbeknownst to everyone, the house they chose belongs to a rich lady and her bodyguard... unaware that they are ancient Egyptians looking to lift a curse that has kept her prince dead for centuries with a sacrifice, and that sacrifice is Oglevee and Kim's friends, who believe this is part of some special birthday celebration. Nikki fights the priestess and Oglevee removes her power source- a magic scarab, ending the Egyptians and destroying the house, shocking Kim into believing this was real and not a themed birthday party.
52	8	"Take the Cookies and Run"	Erma Elzy-Jones	Sherri A. McGee	November 5, 2001	62011-052	5.42
Stuck with 6,000 cookies, Nikki taps the girls from her Big Sister program to sell the sweets in exchange for Lil' Bow Wow tickets. Guest Star: Lil' Kim
53	9	"The Altos"	Tony Singletary	Andrea Allen-Wiley	November 12, 2001	62011-054	4.9
Nikki lands an internship at a waste-removal facility and becomes convinced that her new boss is a mobster. Meanwhile, Kim pretends to have multiple personalities in order to appear on MTV's "True Life". Guest Star: Sway
54	10	"Family Ties and Lies"	Tony Singletary	Stacey Evans Morgan	November 19, 2001	62011-053	5.13
Nikki is stunned by a revelation about her Aunt Rita when the entire family appears on a game show that exploits family secrets. Guest Star: Nancy Wilson
55	11	"Secret Santa"	Tony Singletary	Andrea Allen-Wiley	December 17, 2001	62011-056	4.42
Nikki gets into the Yuletide spirit and prepares her annual Christmas tree-trimming party, but everyone turns her invitations down flat. To lift her spirits, she visits the mall to do her last-minute shopping.
56	12	"The Revolution"	Erma Elzy-Jones	Teri G. Brown	January 21, 2002	62011-055	4.27
Professor Oglevee recalls the 1972 incident that led Santa Monica College to institute a Black Studies program.
57	13	"My Two Dads"	Chip Hurd	Daryl G. Nickens	February 4, 2002	62011-057	4.69
Nikki's biological father visits, sparking a fierce rivalry with her adoptive dad, George, for her affections. Also, Kim competes with Regina over the planning of a luncheon in Nikki's honor.
58	14	"To Love or Not to Love"	Erma Elzy-Jones	Dornita R. LeCount	February 11, 2002	62011-059	4.33
After Nikki's crush on Professor Oglevee gets out of hand on Valentine's Day, Kim persuades her to join a support group for the lovelorn. Meanwhile, Kim receives gifts from a secret admirer.
59	15	"Don't Believe the Hype"	Ken Whittingham	Michelle Listenbee Brown	February 25, 2002	62011-058	4.60
After reuniting with his childhood pal, Lil' Zane, T decides to leave Freestyle Unity, the band he, Kim and Stevie created, on the eve of their scheduled performance at the Spring Jam open mic night.
60	16	"Make a Joyful Noise"	Ken Whittingham	Stacey Evans Morgan	March 4, 2002	62011-060	4.3
Nikki's in heaven when her choir is chosen to compete in a gospel festival---until Kim's defection to a rival group returns her to Earth.
61	17	"A Beautiful Lie"	Tony Singletary	Saran Fitzgerlad	March 18, 2002	62011-064	4.12
Kim, Stevie and T take an I.Q. test as part of a contest to win a car, but after a mixup with the scores, Kim is convinced she is a genius while Stevie's confidence is shattered.
62	18	"The Crush"	Tony Singletary	Monique R. Brandon	March 25, 2002	62011-065	4.78
Professor Oglevee's nephew develops a crush on Nikki. Meanwhile, Kim feels left out of her cousin's friendship with Stevie.
63	19	"The Dates from Hell"	Tony Singletary	Gary M. Goodrich	April 29, 2002	62011-063	3.52
After her break-up with Aaron, Kim agrees to join Stevie in trying a speed-dating service. Meanwhile, Nikki works at Andell's club and catches Professor Oglevee on a date with another woman who turns out to be married. While on a date, Stevie frets over the fact that she doesn't act very feminine.
64	20	"Mother's Day Blues"	William Allen Young	Rushion McDonald	May 6, 2002	62011-062	3.95
Sophia's mother's day party is interrupted when the IRS evicts the Van Lowes from their home. They later move in with Kim and Nikki on a temporary basis.
65	21	"It's Showtime"	Gerren Keith	Michelle Listenbee Brown	May 13, 2002	62011-061	4.21
After Nikki's friend, Bernetta Campbell, wins the lottery, she quits her job working for Magic Johnson at the Magic Johnson Theatres and recommends Nikki to become the new theater manager. But Nikki's bossy attitude leads her staff to quit. Meanwhile, Professor Oglevee has a date with actress Kenya Moore.
66	22	"Teach Me Tonight"	Tony Singletary	Bill Boulware	May 20, 2002	62011-066	5.75
Kim is on academic probation and hires a tutor for help with her studies. When she learns that her tutor is her former speed-dating partner Alan, she tries to woo the uninterested fellow. Due to budget cutbacks, Professor Oglevee must fire two of his best associate professors. After appealing to the dean of students, he finds himself out of work. Depressed, Stanley simply makes everyone believe that he has been promoted a job at USC. To celebrate his new job, Woody takes Stanley for a drink at Andell's club where he becomes heavily drunk. Nikki comes to the rescue and later head for the professor's apartment. Stanley finally reveals to Nikki that he lied about his new promotion and that he was fired. Nikki comforts Stanley which later leads to an unexpected kiss.

=== Season 4 (2002–03) ===
No. overall	No. in season	Title	Directed by	Written by	Original release date	Prod. code	U.S. viewers (millions)
67	1	"The Mourning After"	Tony Singletary	Bill Boulware	September 23, 2002	62011-067	4.68
Following an evening of drowning his sorrows after losing his job, Professor Oglevee awakes from a drunken slumber mortified due to his one-night stand with Nikki. A month later, Nikki starts to feel queasy and soon later learns that she is expecting Professor Oglevee's child. With all this sudden news, Professor Oglevee unexpectedly proposes to Nikki. Meanwhile, Kim pursues a relationship with Alan.
68	2	"She's Hysterical"	Tony Singletary	Andrea Wiley	September 30, 2002	62011-068	4.34
Nikki finds out that she really isn't carrying Professor Ogelvee's baby like she thought. Meanwhile, Kim and Alan start an exercise routine.
69	3	"High Heels and Videotapes"	Tony Singletary	Michelle Listenbee Brown	October 7, 2002	62011-069	3.70
After Nikki and her video camera witness the school's dean in a compromising position, she persuades him to give Professor Oglevee back his old teaching position. Meanwhile, Kim prepares a lavish dinner to impress Alan's parents.
70	4	"Meter Maids Need Love, Too"	Tony Singletary	Stacey Evans Morgan	October 14, 2002	62011-070	4.70
Nikki has a running battle with a traffic warden who's dating Andell. While three ex-cons pledge Kim and Stevie's sorority, a hapless pledge irks frat brothers Professor Oglevee and T. Guest Star: Larry B. Scott
71	5	"Food Fiasco"	Erma Elzy-Jones	Gary M. Goodrich	October 21, 2002	62011-071	4.22
Nikki takes over as the cook at Andell's bistro, when her regular chef goes into labor, and wows a critic with her dishes. Meanwhile, Professor Oglevee hires Kim to keep Nikki at bay.
72	6	"And the Winner Is..."	Tony Singletary	Sarah Fitzgerald	October 28, 2002	62011-072	5.10
Kim, T and Stevie each audition for a national talent show without telling each other. Meanwhile, Nikki wins a big-screen TV with Professor Oglevee's help, whereupon ownership becomes an issue. Guest Star: Vanessa Bell Calloway
73	7	"Kim's 21st Birthday"	Tony Singletary	Dornita R. LeCount	November 4, 2002	62011-073	4.04
It's Kim's 21st birthday and she makes her wish to see Tweet the R&B artist. Nikki then tells her about the tickets but finds out Andell couldn't get the tickets on time. Nikki then decided she wouldn't rest until Kim gets to see Tweet up close and personal once and for all. Nikki and Andell sneak into a hotel to see if Tweet is there but end up standing in front of the hotel window and making sure that they don't fall. Tweet was luckily there and saved them from being stuck out there. Nikki immediately tells Tweet about Kim's 21st birthday and how she wanted to see her. Tweet then performs at the end of the episode for her birthday. And also Stevie doesn't understand why T is acting jealous of her new boyfriend until T makes a romantic move on her. Musical Guest Star: Tweet
74	8	"It's Gary Coleman!"	Tony Singletary	Stacey Evans Morgan	November 11, 2002	62011-074	4.78
Gary Coleman moves into Nikki and Kim's apartment building, inspiring Nikki to move into a career as his manager. Meanwhile, Stevie and T start dating. Guest Star: Gary Coleman
75	9	"Road Trip"	Tony Singletary	Michelle Listenbee Brown	November 18, 2002	62011-075	4.28
Kim, Stevie and T go on a road trip to Las Vegas with their old friend Hakeem, but when Hakeem's car breaks down in the middle of the desert, they are at the mercy of a price-gouging entrepreneur who owns all of the businesses in town. T's jealousy also cramps Stevie's style. Meanwhile, Nikki, Andell and their friends drag Professor Oglevee into their poker game. Last appearance of Lamont Bentley as Hakeem Campbell.
76	10	"Sign of the Shaq"	William Allen Young	Bill Boulware	November 25, 2002	62011-078	4.04
Nikki and Andell infiltrate the Los Angeles Lakers locker room to get an autographed jersey from Shaquille O'Neal after the one belonging to Professor Oglevee is ruined. Meanwhile, Kim takes in a stray dog. Guest Star: Shaquille O'Neal
77	11	"Lights, Camera, Action"	Tony Singletary	Andrea Wiley	December 16, 2002	62011-076	4.75
When Nikki gets a job on her favorite show, she gets excited, but becomes jealous when the show's star hits on Professor Oglevee. Meanwhile, Kim gets a part on the show, but as an extra, and soon gets a role on the show, but gets fired soon after. Guest Stars: Jasmine Guy, Mike Colter
78	12	"The Parent Trap"	Ken Whittingham	Stacey L. McClain-Fields	January 6, 2003	62011-077	4.01
Nikki and Andell get excited about the possibility of becoming sisters when Nikki's biological father and Andell's mother start dating, but when the fledgling romance goes sour, it causes a rift between the two friends. Meanwhile, Alan returns to Kim a changed man. Guest Stars: George Wallace, Laura Hayes
79	13	"Dead Clown Walking"	Erma Elzy-Jones	Gary M. Goodrich	January 20, 2003	62011-080	3.97
Already depressed about her birthday, Andell and Kim try to cheer up Nikki by tracking down Nikki's favorite clown, who used to entertain at her childhood birthday parties. Nikki realizes how much she has to be thankful for following the clown's untimely, albeit accidental, death. Guest Star: Lee Weaver
80	14	"The Hold Up"	Gerren Keith	Arnie Wess	February 3, 2003	62011-079	3.85
Nikki's efforts to get a loan are interrupted when she and Professor Oglevee are taken hostage during a bank robbery committed by a little person, yet she is mistaken for the robber due to shoddy security footage. Guest Star: Steve Harvey
81	15	"Love Potion #83"	Ken Whittingham	Jay Abramowitz	February 10, 2003	62011-083	3.71
Nikki tries to find an antidote after her daughter and friends unwittingly ingest a Jamaican fortune teller's potent love potion.
82	16	"Somebody's Watching You"	Erma Elzy-Jones	Teri G. Brown	February 17, 2003	62011-081	3.26
When Nikki is holed up in Professor Oglevee's apartment with a broken leg, she starts spying on the neighbors and, after she thinks she witnesses a murder, worries her own life is in jeopardy. Meanwhile, Kim's top-secret clothing design idea gets stolen and used in a school fashion show. First appearance of Kel Mitchell as Freddy Jones
83	17	"A Sterling Relationship"	Chip Hurd	Donelle Q. Buck	February 24, 2003	62011-082	3.47
Professor Oglevee is visited by his pompous, successful older brother, Sterling. Meanwhile, Kim writes a gossip column for the school paper, using her friends as material. Guest Star: Reginald VelJohnson
84	18	"That's What Friends Are For"	Ken Whittingham	Dornita R. LeCount	March 24, 2003	62011-084	3.64
When Nikki's wildly spontaneous friend from high school returns to town to participate in the annual AIDS WALK, she drags her to a rave party in San Diego which results in her arrest. Meanwhile, Kim, T and Stevie cram for Professor Oglevee's exam. Guest Star: Kim Coles
85	19	"Amazing Grace"	Ken Whittingham	Andrea Wiley	April 7, 2003	62011-085	4.06
When Nikki overextends herself, a guardian angel appears to her in the form of Grace, who helps Nikki get through some stressful times while preparing for a gospel festival hosted by television personality Bobby Jones. Meanwhile, Professor Oglevee attempts to tutor Kim in order to get her grades up so that she will finally pass his class. Guest Star: Shirley Caesar
86	20	"Join the Club"	Tony Singletary	Sarah Fitzgerald	April 14, 2003	62011-088	2.79
Kim tries to be a friend to Regina so Nikki can stir up catering business at a book club, while Professor Oglevee enlists T's help for a chili-cooking contest.
87	21	"Internship"	Gerren Keith	Chandra Martin Pope	April 21, 2003	62011-089	2.73
Kim and her fashion school nemesis Freddy Fabulous both get internships at a high profile design house, but the competition heats up when they learn that only one of them will end up getting hired in the future.
88	22	"She's a Bad Mamma Jamma"	Tony Singletary	Sara V. Finney	April 28, 2003	62011-091	3.15
When the young son of a widowed friend of Professor Oglevee decides that he wants Nikki to be his new mother, he attempts to get Nikki to give up the Professor so that Nikki will date his father. Meanwhile, Freestyle Unity performs at a "'70s" party in the student union, but a mix-up has the party populated with senior citizens. Musical Guest Star: Nivea
89	23	"The Good, the Bad, and the Funny"	Debbie Allen	Bill Boulware	May 5, 2003	62011-090	3.20
After seeing a picture of an Old West bandit who resembles Prof. Oglevee, Nikki imagines herself the no-nonsense sheriff of a frontier town who falls for Oglevee's clumsy sidewinder. Musical Guest Star: Truth Hurts
90	24	"Jury Duty"	Tony Singletary	Beverly D. Hunter	May 12, 2003	62011-086	3.06
Professor Oglevee is thrilled by the prospect of jury duty when the defendant is an attractive woman---until he realizes he'll be serving with Nikki. Despite proof that shows the defendant committed the crimes, Oglevee refuses to call guilty on the attractive woman to spite Nikki, ultimately declaring the trial a mistrial and angering the other jurors. Meanwhile, Kim captivates a substitute professor who attempts to lead things into a relationship.
91	25	"An Ivy League of Her Own"	Tony Singletary	Daryl G. Nickens	May 19, 2003	62011-087	3.26
When Professor Oglevee inherits his uncle's $10 million fortune, Nikki fears his attraction to Paris---a sexy widow with a string of rich, dead husbands---may prove fatal and warns him against getting involved. Meanwhile, Kim also faces a professorial dilemma when her psychologist boyfriend wants her to move to Harvard, where he's landed a teaching job after using her as an unwitting test subject.

=== Season 5 (2003–04) ===
No. overall	No. in season	Title	Directed by	Written by	Original release date	Prod. code	U.S. viewers (millions)
92	1	"Til Death Do Us Part-And Make It Soon"	Tony Singletary	Bill Boulware	September 15, 2003	62011-092	3.69
When Nikki discovers Professor Oglevee's secret honeymoon whereabouts, she sneaks aboard their yacht to try to win him back only to discover that Stanley's new wife, Paris, is plotting to murder him for his inheritance money. Meanwhile, Nikki also begins to realize how lonely she is since Kim moved across the country to be with her boyfriend. She eventually ends up saving Oglevee from Paris by stowing aboard in the yacht and locking her in the closet with her partner in crime.
93	2	"Squatter's Rights"	Tony Singletary	Andrea Allen-Wiley	September 22, 2003	62011-093	4.07
Professor Oglevee goes broke after his inheritance is swallowed by his uncle's back taxes, forcing him to move in with an elated Nikki, who is convinced this is the first step towards marrying him. But Andell is not so sure.
94	3	"A Plot of View"	Tony Singletary	Gary M. Goodrich	September 29, 2003	62011-094	3.65
Nikki buys a burial plot for herself and Professor Oglevee from a shady undertaker. Meanwhile, Stevie and T hire a new singer for the band in order to replace Kim.
95	4	"Mama, I'm Back"	Gerren Keith	Stacey Evans Morgan	October 6, 2003	62011-095	4.10
Kim returns home from being in Harvard with her boyfriend, but after realizing that Nikki already moved in Erica, the nightmare roommate, Kim, Nikki and Andell use Rushion as a way to get rid of her once and for all so Kim can move back in.
96	5	"The Accidental Therapist"	Tony Singletary	Stacey L. McClain-Fields	October 13, 2003	62011-097	3.80
Nikki blackmails Professor Oglevee into attending therapy sessions when her testimony is required to prove a car accident wasn't his fault. Meanwhile, T and Stevie enlist Kim's help to snap celebrity photos for a tabloid.
97	6	"The Mack Is Like Wo!"	Tony Singletary	Sarah Fitzgerald	October 20, 2003	62011-098	3.99
Professor Oglevee goes on a dating game show where America will choose one of four fine--yet somewhat freaky--women he'll go on a date with. To his horror, Nikki swindles her way on to the show as one of his potential dates. Meanwhile, Kim, Stevie and T open a smoothie stand on campus, but after several failed attempts at finding the right flavor, Kim stumbles upon Grandma's delicious and quite intoxicating secret formula.
98	7	"Kimmie Has Two Moms"	Tony Singletary	Michelle Listenbee Brown	November 3, 2003	62011-096	3.05
When Kim and Nikki win a guest appearance on their favorite daytime talk show, "Zorah," Andell must sub in as Kim's mom when Nikki gets sick on the day of the show, but when Nikki comes bursting into the studio also claiming to be Kim's mom, Zorah continues the show assuming that Andell and Nikki are lesbian mothers. Meanwhile, Professor Oglevee agrees to play Cyrano de Bergerac so T can charm a beautiful older woman. Guest Stars: Vivica A. Fox, Debra Wilson
99	8	"I Never Rapped for My Father"	Tony Singletary	Vida Spears	November 10, 2003	62011-099	3.90
T's dad Thad, a former member of a one-hit wonder group, comes for a rare visit hoping to start a new band with his son, and T is forced to decide between joining his dad or sticking with his band Freestyle Unity. Meanwhile, Andell finds herself in a real bind with Nikki when Lurlene, her cousin visiting from Louisiana, accidentally makes a date with Professor Oglevee. Guest Star: Gerald Levert as Thad Radcliffe
100	9	"Foul Ball"	Ken Whittingham	Bill Boulware	November 17, 2003	62011-100	3.83
Determined not to lose another annual softball game to the boys, Kim, Stevie and Nikki recruit Olympic softball player Jennie Finch as a "ringer" to help them win, forcing Professor Oglevee and T to get a "ringer" of their own, former Cincinnati Red and World Series champion, Eric Davis.
101	10	"Cheaters Never Prosper"	Tony Singletary	Dornita R. LeCount	November 24, 2003	62011-101	4.02
When Nikki becomes Professor Oglevee's teaching assistant, she butts heads with the pretty young student who flirts with him for special treatment. Meanwhile, Kim, Stevie, T, Regina and Freddy compete for $5,000 by volunteering for a psych study in which they are forced to live for three days in cramped quarters. Guest Star: Kellie Shanygne Williams
102	11	"Out with the Old, in with the New"	Tony Singletary	Dornita R. LeCount	December 15, 2003	62011-102	3.34
When Stevie's mom brings home her new and much younger boyfriend, Stevie accepts an awkward invitation to join him for a more private meeting. Nikki suspects that he may be interested in more than friendship and convinces Sophia to spy on them. Meanwhile, Nikki enlists the gang's help in throwing a garage sale, but Professor Oglevee initially refuses to get involved until he realizes that there is money to be made.
103	12	"School of Hard Knocks"	Tony Singletary	Gary M. Goodrich	January 12, 2004	62011-103	3.34
When local DJ's Shag and Tone pick Kim as their new "on-air hottie with a body," a bitter rivalry erupts between the two radio jocks as they both secretly vie for Kim's attention. Meanwhile, Nikki fumes after Andell becomes Professor Oglevee's star student.
104	13	"Can Two Wrongs Make a Right?"	Erma Elzy-Jones	Sarah Fitzgerald	February 9, 2004	62011-104	3.12
Nikki is up for a need-based scholarship to a university, but it is put in jeopardy when the school's representative shows up early to interview her and finds her at Andell's during a party gone wild. Also, Professor Oglevee lies about being a single dad in order to date a beautiful single mom.
105	14	"She's Positive"	Tony Singletary	Andrea Wiley	February 16, 2004	62011-105	3.47
When Kim and Stevie take T to a Murphy Lee show to celebrate his birthday, T meets and falls head over heels for Kai (Chilli of TLC) the girl of his dreams, but before things start to get hot and heavy between the two, she reveals that she is HIV positive. Meanwhile, Professor Oglevee enlists Nikki's catering talents to help impress a visiting team of representatives from a high profile university that is considering him for their Vice Presidency.
106	15	"Judge Not a Book"	Tony Singletary	Michelle Listenbee Brown	February 23, 2004	62011-106	3.31
After Nikki tells an author tales of her "love life" with Professor Oglevee, the author convinces Nikki to write her own book about it all. The book becomes a best-seller that has love-starved women chasing after Stanley. Now Nikki must devise a plan to scare them all away from her man. Meanwhile, Kim assists the head stylist for a super obnoxious supermodel.
107	16	"Practice What You Preach"	Erma Elzy-Jones	Stacey Evans Morgan	March 1, 2004	62011-107	2.87
An old friend from Nikki's wild days visits who is now the new Rev. at Nikki's church. Her promiscuous past causes turmoil in the church, which forces Nikki into the role of peacemaker. Also, Professor Oglevee gets Kim to coach him for a singing audition with the chorale group so he can join them on an exotic trip to Spain. Guest Star: Yolanda Adams
108	17	"Could It Be You"	Tony Singletary	Stacey L. McClain-Fields	April 26, 2004	62011-108	2.70
As the gang is walking into the Student Union, they find the place a mess. They find Woody sitting on a chair depressed. He tells them that he asked Mavis, his girlfriend, to marry him, but she turned him down. Stevie thinks that Mavis needs more time, but Woody is growing impatient. He sees the professor walking in. The professor is disgusted by the position of the Student Union. He hears of Woody's little problem. When Woody asks the professor if he can move in, he immediately refuses. Woody is disappointed, but the professor decides to let him come. Woody then asks the professor to take his suitcase to his apartment. Nikki and Andell are talking. Andell tells Nikki about a man she goes out with named Lester. Nikki thinks there is something serious between him and Andell. When Lester comes over to their apartment to pick Andell up, Kim tells Nikki that she has to cancel their plans to go to the mall. When Lester hears that Nikki's plans for the night are gone, he decides to let her come with him and Andell on their date. Andell doesn't want her to come, but she decides to let her come if she eats fast. After the date is over, Lester walks Nikki and Andell home. When Nikki gets to her apartment, Andell is relieved. Unfortunately for her, Lester feels it is getting late and has to go. Andell is left upset. While Andell and Lester are driving to a restaurant. Nikki asks them to pick her up from a place. Andell is upset about this, but she goes to pick her up. When they let her in, Nikki suggests that they let her come with them to a new restaurant. Once again, Nikki ruins one of Andell's dates. The gang suggests a makeover for Woody. This can probably bring Mavis back into Woody's life and take Woody out of the professor's apartment. Later, Andell comes by Nikki's apartment. Andell tells him that “a special someone” is coming by. When Nikki asks if it's the professor, Andell says yes. Nikki is very excited about this; she can finally have a date with the professor… When Nikki and Andell get to the restaurant, they see Lester and another man. The man is not the professor. Instead, Lester brings a man named Johnnie. Nikki reminds Andell that she said it was going to be the professor. Andell lied; but if everything works out, this man will be her new lover. Andell and Lester walk away while they leave Nikki and Johnnie alone. Nikki doesn't want to offend Johnnie, so she talks with him a little. She tells him that she is already engaged; she doesn't want to do anything that will hurt her relationship. Johnnie feels the same way; he also is engaged. Nikki and Johnnie have found one thing they have in common: they are crazy about love. Then they find something else: they both like grape-flavored Remy Red. Later, Nikki and Johnnie are still talking while Andell and Lester return. They have been having a good time talking about “everything under the sun.” Andell feels it's time to go home, but Nikki and Johnnie don't feel like going yet. Andell feels that she should take Nikki home since she brought them there, but Johnnie says that she can take Nikki home. Lester then tells Andell that if he takes Nikki home, then she can take him home. Andell doesn't take a second to think and immediately goes home with Lester. Johnnie and Nikki continue to talk. The time has come for Woody to see Mavis again. He makes an entrance by walking in as a classy man from the professor's room at his apartment. He hears the doorbell and answers to Mavis. When Mavis sees him, she is confused; she can't tell if that is really Woody at first glance. Woody Takes her to her seat at a table in the professor's living room. He shows them their dinner. When he takes a seat, he pours them two glasses of soda; the wine just isn't working for Woody. After he and Mavis start eating, Woody gets down on one foot and proposes to Mavis. Mavis immediately accepts after seeing his ring. While she and Woody are sharing a kiss, Woody backs down. He tells her that he can't put on this act anymore; if she can't accept him for who he is, then he just can't marry her. Mavis tells him that he does love him for who he is, she just wants to be treated special too. She’ll marry him if he puts on this act once every month. Woody then tells her once every six months. Mavis’ final offer is once every two months and he has a deal. The professor then yells, “Deal!” from another room while taking out Woody's suitcase. While he is celebrating with his “victory dance,” Woody and Mavis share another kiss. Finally, Nikki and Johnnie arrive home from the restaurant. They feel they had a nice time there. Johnnie then tells Nikki that if he didn't have his fiancée, he would definitely be chasing Nikki. Nikki then tells him, if she didn't have the professor, he wouldn't have to chase her. While he is about to leave, Johnnie gives Nikki a little peck on the lips, but one second later, it becomes a bigger peck. Johnnie then realizes what he is doing. He apologizes to Nikki. She accepts his apology with a nod. While he is about to open the door, he then goes back and he and Nikki mutually share a very big kiss. To Be Continued…
109	18	"A Little Change Never Hurt Anybody"	Tony Singletary	Kellie Griffin	May 3, 2004	62011-109	3.10
Nikki is pacing the floor. She is worried. Later, Andell comes over. Nikki tells her that she cheated on the professor; she kissed Johnnie in the last episode. Andell doesn't see this as a big problem; she thinks that Nikki should forget about the professor and move on. Nikki doesn't want to go through with it. She decides to have a little talk with Johnnie. While asking him on the phone, he says he’ll be right over. When Nikki opens the door, Johnnie is there. It seems that he was waiting in his car the whole night after kissing her. Andell finds it romantic. When Nikki questions, why she doesn't find her and the professor romantic, she says she finds it crazy. At the Student Union, Kim finds out that she can't graduate. She tells Stevie and T about this. They have their condolences, but Kim still needs to deal with Nikki. Her friends suggest that she tells Nikki right now, where there are witnesses. When Nikki arrives, Kim tells her. Nikki doesn't think of it as a big deal. She thinks that school just isn't for Kim and she should follow her own destiny; she should try to become a fashion designer. First, Kim will need a loan, so she decides to ask her father. Nikki then sees the professor. He tells them of good news: he got a teaching job at Weatherly University. Nikki is happy about this; this is her first choice college. The professor is shocked by this; he feels he will never get rid of Nikki. Nikki and Johnnie are playing a game against Andell and Lester. They have been beating them the whole time. When Andell grows tired of losing, she decides to leave with Lester. Johnnie and Nikki both notice that neither one of them mentioned their lovers. While about to share a kiss, Kim walks in. It turns out that she can't get a loan from her dad because he is tight on cash. Later, Nikki receives a letter from Weatherly University. She is to nervous to open it, so she has Kim open it. Kim reads that Nikki didn't get in, but then she reads that this university “will not be accepting any more new students… ever.” Stevie takes a look at it. The letter isn't written on Weatherly stationery. Nikki takes a look at the letter. She takes a sniff and scent that it is the professor; she knows that scent anywhere. Kim then tells her that her loan from the bank was rejected as soon as she said her name. Stevie then decides to help her out with business. Later, T comes over to her with a newspaper article. Johnnie wrote her a little poem. This raises Nikki's spirits; she realizes that she doesn't need the professor anymore. Andell and Nikki are talking about Johnnie. They realize that they haven't talked about the professor in a long time. Later, Johnnie comes over. He came with good news: he was promoted to head chef. Nikki is so proud of him. Then he tells her that he’ll have to move to New York; he won't be coming back. Nikki is very upset about this. Johnnie then tells her that he can still keep in touch with her after he moves out, and they still have two weeks. They decides to celebrate later. As Johnnie walks out the door, Nikki is filled with a lot of depression. T goes over to Kim and T. He tells them that got in to Berklee's School of Music. Stevie and T are upset; this is the end of Freestyle Unity. Later, Stevie receives a call from Bill, her mother's boyfriend. He would love to invest in Kim's business. She and Kim decide to go into business together. Later, the gang notices the professor. He is trying to get signatures for a petition to keep Nikki out of Weatherly University. The gang tells him that there's no need for that; Nikki is over with him. The professor think that it is hard to believe. He was wondering why “he had a Miss Parker-free date.” He feels that he is too much of an attraction… Kim is pulling Nikki along with her as they run back to their apartment. She tells her that she has to go to the bathroom, but when they get in, she reveals that Johnnie has turned the living room into a Jamaican paradise. Kim leaves and Nikki spends the time with Johnnie. She feels a little self-conscious about this, and at the same time, disappointed. After having their dinner, Johnnie makes a speech. He tells her that he just can't live his life without her. She gets down on one foot and proposes to her. Nikki is shocked at this. Before she gives her answer, she goes out on the balcony and prays to God. She needs to know if Johnnie is the right man for her. After receiving many “signs from God” such as thunder and earthquakes, she goes back in. Johnnie is starting to regret proposing -- not for him, but for her. He feels that he is rushing things… Nikki doesn't care. She says yes. To Be Continued…
110	19	"At Last"	Tony Singletary	Bill Boulware & Sara V. Finney	May 10, 2004	62011-110	4.44
Nikki is showing off her engagement ring to the gang down at the Student Union. Everyone is impressed. When the professor sees it, he gets very excited; so excited, he back-flips his way out of the Student Union. Later, Stevie, Kim, and Woody are talking at the Student Union. Woody tells them that he and Mavis opened up their own restaurant. Stevie and Kim are happy for him as they also have their own business. T comes over later. He starts feeling very upset that these are their last moments together. He gives them a hug to show his sympathy. Stevie and Kim do their best to show the same sympathy. Later, Regina comes over to them. Without saying anything, the gang finds out that she is pregnant. She continues to tell it to everybody on campus. Andell comes over to Nikki's apartment from her trip to Las Vegas. She tells Nikki that she hit the jackpot---she is married. They didn't have a formal wedding, but Nikki reassures her: the point is, they got married; that she finally found her soul mate---and so did she. She shows off her ring to Andell. Andell is very happy for her. Nikki says that she will marry Johnnie in two different ceremonies. Her parents can't make it in the first ceremony, so she's going to have another one. She tells her that she will be getting married in a church---this is when the phone rings. The pastor calls and tells her that they can't have her wedding at the church on her day; they have a five-day conference. Nikki is upset about this, but at least she has her catering to look forward to---the phone rings again. This time, Ingrid, her caterer, cancels on her to go to a celebrity wedding. Nikki is in distress; she is worried that the next call she receives will be Johnnie. Nikki is wondering if it is right to marry Johnnie. Andell won't have any of this; she will not rest until Nikki and Johnnie are married. She says that they can get married at her restaurant, and if the chef's not in, Andell can cook for them. Nikki, Stevie, and T are graduating from college. They are wondering whether Kim is upset that she did not receive her degree. She tells them not to worry; she still has her business to fall back on. Johnnie is very proud of Nikki---valedictorian, merit scholarship, etc. He leaves and tells her that he will see her at the altar. The professor comes by later; he gives her a gift certificate for tupperware. After congratulating her, he runs away, hoping he will never see her again. Later, the professor is spending his evening alone. While smoking a cigar, he makes a smoke ring which shows his attitude towards Nikki in previous episodes. Then he hears a voice calling him; a voice which sounds exactly like him. He looks in the mirror and he sees the man. It is his inner voice (or inner self). This voice is telling him that he cannot let Nikki get married. If he does, he will be making the biggest mistake of his life. The professor has a little chat with this “voice.” He realizes what he is doing. While he is running out of his apartment, the “voice” looks into the camera and says, “What a cornball.” The professor runs up to Nikki's apartment to tell Nikki that he loves her. When he arrives, he only finds Andell. He asks her for Nikki. Andell is not sure why, but then he tells her that he must marry her, not Johnnie. Andell pays no heed to what he has to say. She tells him that Nikki will finally have a new life, a new family; he will only get in the way. The professor is desperate, so Andell decides to “humor” him. She asks him to get Nikki's coat from the closet. The professor goes into the closet and looks for it. When he asks which coat is Nikki's, Andell pushes him into the closet and locks the door. Andell goes to the wedding while the professor is trapped inside. Later, at the wedding, the guests begin arriving. Woody and Mavis arrive. Mavis asks him why he never brought her to Andell's restaurant before. He jokingly tells her if he did, it would be hard to pick up women. Then, Regina comes in. She continues to tell everybody that she is pregnant. Later, Kim, Stevie, and T hear a loud noise coming from outside. Kim tells them that it's Shaquan. When she arrives, she and Kim embrace while they use Ebonics. Then Shaquan tells Kim that she knows the father of Regina's baby. She whispers it into her ear as Kim gives a big gape. Nikki is trying out her wedding dress. Andell is with her. Nikki begins to have thoughts about the professor. Andell tells her to get rid of them; she will marry Johnnie; the professor is history. Nikki then agrees and moves on to the wedding. Andell meets Johnnie's family: his mother, his sister, and his brother. They compliment her while she's around, but scoff at her and Nikki behind their backs. Kim, Stevie, and T confront Regina. They know the father of her baby. They reveal that it is Freddy Fabulous. It turns out that Shaquan and Freddy go to the same beauty parlor. This embarrasses Regina, so she begs them not to tell anyone. They give her their promise, but just seconds later, Kim walks up to Woody to tell him something… The wedding commences. Nikki is walking down the aisle with Professor Imes. He tells her that he is happy to fill in for her dads, but he is not sure whether people will believe that he is her father. Nikki tells him that everyone may think that he is her brother. They continue walking down the aisle. Professor Imes gives Nikki away to the minister. The minister begins the ceremony. He asks the people if there is any reason why Nikki and Johnnie should not be wed, “speak now or forever hold your peace.” When no one objects, the minister is about to ask them whether they should get married; this is where Andell interrupts him. She tells them that they cannot be wed because Nikki is in love with the professor, and she is sorry to say that he loves her too. When Johnnie asks why the professor isn't here to tell Nikki that, Andell gets a little nervous. Then, everyone hears the professor from outside. He is yelling at them to wait. He runs into the restaurant where Andell greets him. He professor tells her that he now has a dislocated shoulder from banging it against the closet door. Andell decides not to worry about that and just tells him it's nice to see him there. The professor goes up to the altar. He tells her that he doesn't blame her for telling him to get lost, but from this day on, no matter what Nikki says, he will always love her. Nikki starts tearing up at this; she tells him that she loves him too. She then turns to Johnnie and apologizes; she loves him, but she has been chasing the professor for years. Johnnie then understands and leaves the altar with a crushed heart. The professor gets down on one knee and “borrows” Johnnie's ring; with his approval. He asks Nikki to marry him, to which she says yes. The wedding of Nikki and the professor comes to an end when the minister pronounces them husband and wife. After sharing a kiss, they walk down the aisle. Kim begins to sing “At Last” while T plays the keyboard and Stevie watches them walk together.
