= List of Moesha episodes =

The following is a list of episodes for the American television sitcom Moesha. The series ran on UPN from January 23, 1996, to May 14, 2001, with a total of 127 episodes produced, spanning six seasons. The pilot episode was filmed in late April 1995, while filming for the first season began in October 1995.

== Series overview ==
Season	Episodes	Originally released	
Season	Episodes	First released	Last released
1	14	January 23, 1996	May 21, 1996
2	24	August 27, 1996	May 20, 1997
3	23	August 26, 1997	May 19, 1998
4	22	October 6, 1998	May 25, 1999
5	22	August 23, 1999	May 22, 2000
6	22	September 4, 2000	May 14, 2001

== Episodes ==
=== Season 1 (1996) ===
No. overall	No. in season	Title	Directed by	Written by	Original release date	Prod. code	Viewers (millions)
1	1	"Pilot"	Stan Lathan	Story by : Ralph Farquhar & Sara V. Finney & Vida Spears; Teleplay by : Sara V. Finney & Vida Spears	January 23, 1996	6495-001	6.0
Moesha copes with the fact that her father, Frank, has a new wife, Dee, which means that her plans of caring for Frank and her younger brother, Myles, are over. Moesha soon becomes jealous when she finds Dee taking her place as the breakfast chef. Then when Moesha asks if she can go to The Den, a local hangout, Dee opposes since it is a school night. So Moesha simply gets Frank to agree by making him feel guilty about forcing her to wait until she's sixteen before she can date. Later, Moesha joins her boy-crazy friends Kim, Trina, and Gail at The Den where the school's most handsome fellow named Ohagi begins to recite poetry. When he leaves The Den with Moesha, it becomes clear that they've been secretly dating. Moesha arrives late for dinner. When Dee reprimands her, Frank once again stops her. Dee complains to Frank about undermining her authority as a parent. Realizing that he's no longer a single parent, Frank apologizes and backs off. Consequently, Dee is forced to ground Moesha for being disrespectful.
2	2	"Friends"	Stan Lathan	Sara V. Finney & Vida Spears	January 30, 1996	6495-002	6.1
Note: Brandy's own song "Best Friend" was featured on this episode.
3	3	"Sixteen"	Stan Lathan	Ralph Farquhar	February 6, 1996	6495-004	5.7
4	4	"Hakeem Owes Moesha Big"	Stan Lathan	Calvin Brown, Jr.	February 13, 1996	6495-003	5.1
5	5	"Million Boy March"	Terri McCoy	Fred Johnson	February 20, 1996	6495-006	6.5
Musical guest: Jodeci
6	6	"Driving Miss Moesha"	Terri McCoy	James E. West II & T. Smith III	March 5, 1996	6495-007	5.2
7	7	"Chain, Chain, Chain"	Terri McCoy	Ron Neal	March 12, 1996	6495-008	6.1
8	8	"Job"	Henry Chan	Mara Brock Akil	March 26, 1996	6495-010	4.9
9	9	"Niece"	Terri McCoy	Felicia D. Henderson	April 9, 1996	6495-011	4.5
10	10	"Reunion"	Stan Lathan	Felicia D. Henderson	April 23, 1996	6495-005	4.0
11	11	"The Ditch Party"	Terri McCoy	Silvia Cardenas	April 30, 1996	6495-012	3.9
12	12	"Mother's Day"	Terri McCoy	Sara V. Finney & Vida Spears	May 7, 1996	6495-009	3.3
Musical guest: Out of Eden
13	13	"Baby Love"	Henry Chan	Ron Neal	May 14, 1996	6495-015	3.5
14	14	"Hakeem's New Flame"	Henry Chan	Fred Johnson	May 21, 1996	6495-014	4.3

=== Season 2 (1996–97) ===
- Fredro Starr joins the cast.
- Shar Jackson joins the main cast.

No. overall	No. in season	Title	Directed by	Written by	Original release date	Prod. code	Viewers (millions)
15	1	"The List"	Henry Chan	Mara Brock Akil	August 27, 1996	6496-018	5.4
The boys' annual "list" comes out and Moesha isn't pleased to discover that she's been named as having the "biggest booty". (Kim is named as having the "biggest mouth" and Niecy is named as having the "smallest chest".) When they try to discover the list's author, all roads turn to new student Quinton Brooks from New York. Moesha confronts Q and he denies it. He later invites her to see him perform at a club, and Moesha soon becomes intrigued by the newcomer. Note: This episode marks the first appearance of Fredro Starr as Quinton 'Q' Brooks
16	2	"Credit Card (Big Trouble)"	Henry Chan	Fred Johnson	September 3, 1996	6496-017	5.2
After passing on the Saturn, Moesha has bought another car, but she already regrets it. After her car runs out of fuel, running short on money and bothering her parents for money and a ride, Frank and Dee reluctantly agree to let her have her own credit card for emergencies only. Then on her way to a party, Q is locked up and the only way to bail him out is by using her credit card.
17	3	"Mama Said Knock You Out (Knock Em Out)"	Henry Chan	Silvia Cardenas	September 10, 1996	6496-019	5.9
Kim becomes jealous when Moesha begins to hang out with her new friend Teresa. Then, when Teresa gets along well with Q too, Kim talks Moesha into believing that Teresa wants to steal him. A fight is the result, but it's Teresa and Kim who end up meeting to settle things.
18	4	"Basket Case"	Henry Chan	Sara V. Finney & Vida Spears	September 17, 1996	6496-020	4.9
It's the annual Basket Auction at Crenshaw High. (The boys put together a basket, which is auctioned off to raise money, and the auction-winning girl then gets a date with the boy responsible for putting together the basket she bought.) Moesha manages to get a list, but it's wrong and she ends up with Hakeem instead of her dream boy. Later, after hanging out together, Moesha and Hakeem accidentally kiss.
19	5	"The Whistle Blower"	Henry Chan	Ron Neal	September 24, 1996	6496-021	5.3
Terry Hightower (special guest star Kobe Bryant), Crenshaw High's star basketball player, asks Moesha for help on the upcoming S.A.T. He asks her to take the test for him. Mo declines, but encourages Terry to at least try taking the test. After Terry gets a high score on the test, everyone believes Mo took it for him and Terry is subsequently forced into taking it again. Meanwhile, Dee urges Frank take do a fertility test. Absent: Fredro Starr as Quinton "Q" Brooks
20	6	"Labels"	Henry Chan	Demetrius Andre Bady	October 1, 1996	6496-022	5.4
When Hakeem shows up with his cousin Omar (Chris Lobban) at the Mitchells', everyone fears he could be another Hakeem. Instead, he seems to be nice and responsible. Moesha, still grieving about her break-up with Q, goes out on a date with Omar. After attending a movie, they meet Omar's friend, Tracy, leading Moesha to believe that Omar may be gay. Moesha later tells Kim and Niecy of her suspicions, and it doesn't take long until everyone in school knows the latest gossip. When Hakeem hears the news, Moesha realises that she may have jeopardized her friendship with him. Later, Omar tells Hakeem that Mo's suspicions about his sexuality are true.
21	7	"Women Are From Mars, Men Are From Saturn"	Henry Chan	T. Smith III & James E. West II	October 15, 1996	6496-016	4.6
Dee is fed up when Frank spends more time hanging out with his friends than he spends at home with her. Absent: Fredro Starr as Quinton "Q" Brooks
22	8	"Ichi, Ni, San, Shi Look -- Clarkzilla!"	Henry Chan	T. Smith III & James E. West II	October 29, 1996	6496-023	5.6
Mo's nerdy cousin Clark (Shawn Harrison) stops in for a visit and turns everyone's lives into nightmares.
23	9	"A Concerted Effort: Part 1"	Henry Chan	Fred Johnson & Ron Neal	November 5, 1996	6496-025	5.8
Moesha wins four tickets to a concert, but finds herself a ticket short after reuniting with Q.
24	10	"A Concerted Effort: Part 2"	Henry Chan	Fred Johnson & Ron Neal	November 5, 1996	6496-026	5.8
Moesha tries to make Q jealous when she meets Montell Jordan, but they eventually talk over their differences, and she takes him to meet Frank. Kim and Nicey try to gain access to the concert and continually fail. Eventually Q's cousins fulfil their dreams by performing for Kim and Nicey. Note: This episode features musical guest stars (Soul for Real, Xscape, MC Lyte, Nancy Wilson, Montell Jordan and 112).
25	11	"The Regulations of Love"	Henry Chan	Silvia Cardenas	November 12, 1996	6496-027	6.1
Moesha hosts a dinner party for her friends. Kim tries to get Hakeem to notice her by using her how-to-book called "The Regulations of Love," but Hakeem isn't interested. After ruining everyone's night and realizing that Hakeem doesn't want her, Kim tries a different approach to attracting Hakeem: making him jealous. To do so, she asks Michael out but doesn't know that Michael has a crush on her. Meanwhile, Frank and Myles drive Dee crazy with their new Nigerian drums.
26	12	"There's No Place Like the Mitchell Home"	Henry Chan	Felicia D. Henderson	November 19, 1996	6496-028	4.8
Andell drives the Mitchells crazy while recuperating in their home from an inline skating accident.
27	13	"Road Trip"	Henry Chan	Mara Brock Akil	November 26, 1996	6496-024	4.9
Moesha and the girls find help from a Native American store owner when their car breaks down in the snow.
28	14	"Guess Q's Coming to Dinner"	Erma Elzy-Jones	T. Smith III & James E. West II	January 7, 1997	6496-031	6.21
Moesha's grades and performance in her domestic chores suffer when she sneaks dates with Q.
29	15	"Mentor"	Mary Ellen Jones	Sara V. Finney & Vida Spears	January 14, 1997	6495-013	5.51
Moesha, Kim, and Hakeem steal oranges from Mrs. Moss' garden in retaliation for her grumpy behavior. Moesha later gets punished and has to work for a week for Mrs. Moss. Moesha and Mrs. Moss clash, but Mo begins to appreciate her time with Mrs. Moss after learning that Mrs. Moss lived during the Harlem Renaissance-era. Note: This episode aired as a season 1 episode.
30	16	"Break a Leg (Miles On TV)"	Henry Chan	Ron Neal	January 28, 1997	6496-033	4.80
Moesha starts volunteering at the community center giving dance lessons to some girls. While Myles is helping her demonstrate some moves to the girls, a commercial agent (guest star Estelle Harris) is interested in having Myles do some commercials. After discussing it with Frank and Dee, they finally decide Myles can do a commercial. Myles gets into a fight at school because some kids said that he thought he was "all that", and he comes home with a bloody lip. Family and friends see him in his commercial, but he's only in a small portion. After a while, Myles starts to get a little tired of being in the entertainment business. Moesha gets angry when Frank and Dee have a hard time deciding who should go to Moesha's dance competition for the girls at the community center and who should go with Myles to film his next commercial. Later, Myles, Frank and Hakeem all show up at Moesha's dance competition. Absent: Fredro Starr as Quinton "Q" Brooks
31	17	"Who Moved the Charity Stripe?"	Henry Chan	Felicia D. Henderson	February 4, 1997	6496-034	6.49
Dee instructs Coach Vines (Dwight Woody) to suspend Q and two other star players from the basketball team until their grades improve, putting Crenshaw High's championship hopes in jeopardy.
32	18	"Back in Africa"	Henry Chan	Mara Brock Akil	February 11, 1997	6496-030	4.82
Moesha is excited about a school trip to Africa, until she learns she may not be able to go because of financial problems.
33	19	"Strike a Pose"	Jimmy B. Frazier	Felicia D. Henderson	February 18, 1997	6496-035	4.59
Moesha is inspired after meeting Ladonna, but she must reconcile her newfound feminism when she is asked to model.
34	20	"Songs in the Key of Strife"	Henry Chan	Sherryll Atkins	March 18, 1997	6496-037	4.95
A French exchange student staying with the Mitchells (China Moses) sings backup on a rap demo with Kim.
35	21	"Hakeem's Birthday"	Ted Lange	Kenneth Nowling	April 29, 1997	6496-036	3.85
Moesha's birthday surprise for Hakeem is getting his father back into his life, but it backfires when Hakeem finds out. Note: Michael Ralph guest stars.
36	22	"For Better or Worse"	Shirley Jo Finney	Silvia Cardenas	May 6, 1997	6496-032	3.98
Niecy gets engaged, but backs out of it when she learns her fiance wants her to stay home and have babies.
37	23	"Cold Busted"	Henry Chan	Fred Johnson	May 13, 1997	6496-038	4.46
Moesha's parents catch her and Q kissing on her bed when they arrive home from a night out, and they decide they may send her to a private school.
38	24	"Prom Fright"	Henry Chan	Felicia D. Henderson	May 20, 1997	6496-039	4.59
Still on punishment for having Q in her bedroom, Moesha faces a complete remission if she agrees to go with the son of one of Frank's frat brothers on a blind date to his prom. When Q finds out about this, he isn't very pleased, and it leads to a break-up.

=== Season 3 (1997–98) ===
No. overall	No. in season	Title	Directed by	Written by	Original release date	Prod. code	Viewers (millions)
39	1	"Labor Day Jammy"	Henry Chan	Sara V. Finney & Vida Spears	August 26, 1997	6497-041	5.21
Musical guest Dru Hill; Moesha returns from summer camp and has about one week left before she starts school at Bridgewood Academy for her Junior year, so she makes plans to go to the Labor Day Jammy with her friends, secretly hoping to run into Q there. Moesha clashes with Frank when he wants her to go with him and Dee to Bridgewood's fundraiser. Moesha meets her new classmate, Haley Dillard, and together they con Frank into letting them "hang out with Haley's friends." Moesha finds Q at the Jammy, but they agree to just be friends.
40	2	"(Grand)Poppa Don't Take No Mess"	Henry Chan	Fred Johnson	August 26, 1997	6497-040	5.30
Grandpa Roosevelt Mitchell visits along with Uncle Bernie, but Frank soon suffers when Grandpa treats him differently than Bernie. Moesha tries to talk Q into attending her family's barbecue, but he declines.
41	3	"Day One"	Henry Chan	Ralph R. Farquhar	September 2, 1997	6497-042	5.03
Moesha begins her first day of school at Bridgewood Academy. She is introduced to snobby Mary Ellen Hobbs, the daughter of a friend of Dee's. The following day, Moesha clashes with Mary Ellen during a class discussion and walks out of class. She visits Crenshaw and finds out that she isn't missed very much.
42	4	"Age Ain't Nothin' But a Number"	Henry Chan	Calvin Brown, Jr.	September 9, 1997	6497-043	4.62
Hakeem meets a beautiful woman, Jennifer Sutton, at the clothing store where he works. When she starts to show an interest in Hakeem, he lies about his age. Both Moesha and Dee disapprove of Hakeem's relationship with Jennifer, but Frank assures them that nothing's wrong with them dating. Later, after feeling guilty, Hakeem breaks up with Jennifer.
43	5	"My Mom's Not an Ottoman"	Henry Chan	Mara Brock Akil	September 16, 1997	6497-044	3.99
Dee decides it's time to redecorate the house, so she decides to put on a garage sale and encourages Moesha to donate any of her old junk. However, when Moesha learns that Dee's trying to sell the furniture that belonged to her mother, she loses her cool.
44	6	"The Play Scene"	Henry Chan	Ron Neal	September 23, 1997	6497-045	4.40
After her teacher gives her a 'D' on her creative writing assignment, Moesha writes a screenplay, imagining a world in 1945 where jazz and blues set the scene.
45	7	"Use Me Once Shame on You, Use Me Twice I'll Kill You"	Henry Chan	T. Smith III & James E. West II	September 30, 1997	6497-046	5.34
Q, Hakeem and Kim decide to merge their talents and create their own group, CPQ. After seeing her friends perform at The Den, Moesha decides to invite Haley, whose father is a record producer, to hear her friends sing. However, she risks losing a friend in Haley who feels that Moesha is using her.
46	8	"Keepin' It Real"	Erma Elzy-Jones	Demetrius Andre Bady	October 14, 1997	6497-047	5.21
Moesha's new classmate, Jeremy Davis, shows an interest in her, but he later disappoints her when he tries too hard to impress her friends. Meanwhile, Dee goes on strike after no one seems to help her out around the house.
47	9	"Halloween Part 1: Kim's Revenge"	Ted Lange	Silvia Cardenas	October 28, 1997	66497-048	5.36
Kim accidentally hears Moesha and Niecy making fun of her weight. Upset, Kim gives them the cold shoulder when they all are supposed to dress as the "Divas of Soul" for the Halloween party at The Den. As Moesha and Niecy attempt to apologize to Kim, they all find themselves victims of and guilty parties to gossiping behind each other's backs. Meanwhile, Myles catches the flu, forcing him to stay home and cancel "trick-or-treating."
48	10	"Rhythm and Dues"	Henry Chan	Fred Johnson	November 4, 1997	6497-050	5.14
Moesha becomes the manager of Q's group, CPQ, after a local radio station plays their record demo. But they're faced with a dilemma when Morris Day decides to sue them for resampling one of his songs. Dee can't seem to remember her first date with Frank.
49	11	"Break It Down"	Henry Chan	Calvin Brown, Jr.	November 11, 1997	6497-049	5.39
Frank accompanies Hakeem to a "Father-Son" retreat. Q and his father attend the retreat as well; stirring up some unresolved hostility between Frank and Q. As Frank, Q and the others resolve their conflicts, Frank and Q come to a new understanding. Meanwhile, the girls (and Myles) learn self-defense techniques from Don "The Dragon" Wilson who's in town to shoot a new movie and needs The Den as a part of the set.
50	12	"Double Date"	Henry Chan	Mara Brock Akil	November 18, 1997	6497-051	5.92
Musical guest: Kenny Lattimore. On a date with Jeremy, Moesha runs into Q and his new girlfriend Tammy; Moesha still has feelings for Q as he does for her. Confused about where their relationship stands, Q asks her out to dinner. However, after arguing and sorting out mixed feelings, Moesha and Q decide once and for all to just remain friends. Meanwhile, Myles' girlfriend is a little "high-maintenance."
51	13	"Talk of the Town"	Henry Chan	Fred Johnson	November 25, 1997	6497-029	4.65
A party organized by Q at a teen club called The Bombay gets out of control after a rumor is spread that a big star is performing there. After getting arrested by the police, Andell holds a community meeting at The Den to discuss the differences between young adults and adults. Note: This episode aired as a season 2 episode.
52	14	"He Ain't Heavy, He's Dee's Brother"	Tony Singletary	T. Smith III & James E. West II	January 13, 1998	6497-052	4.71
Dee's enterprising brother, Shelby, visits and offers Moesha a money-earning opportunity, but Dee questions his prospects for future success.
53	15	"The Short Story"	Mary Valente	Traci Cohen & Lia Prewitt	February 3, 1998	6497-054	2.82
Musical guest: Chico DeBarge; Moesha agrees to attend a dance being held at The Den with her friend David, who's rather a little person. Moesha soon finds out that she isn't bothered by his height, but by his rudeness. Meanwhile, Myles has issues about his height.
54	16	"It's My Paper, and I'll Cry If I Want to"	Henry Chan	Sara V. Finney & Vida Spears	February 24, 1998	6497-053	3.45
Mary Ellen, editor of Bridgewood's school newspaper, doesn't give Moesha a chance to write for the paper, so without much ado, Moesha installs a rival paper called "The Blurb." She gets so wrapped up in writing her paper that she neglects plans to celebrate Andell's 30th birthday party.
55	17	"She's Back"	Shirley Jo Finney	Silvia Cardenas	March 3, 1998	6497-055	3.12
Prominent career newswoman Alexandria Nourse gives a speech at Bridgewood, and since she's an old friend of Frank's, Moesha invites her over for dinner. But it turns out that they were more than just "friends."
56	18	"Model Employee"	Henry Chan	Calvin Brown, Jr.	March 17, 1998	6497-058	3.14
In need of money, Hakeem gets Moesha a job at the clothing store where he works, but the new manager begins to take advantage of Moesha.
57	19	"Mo's Money, Mo's Money, Mo's Money"	Ken Whittingham	Mara Brock Akil & T. Smith III & James E. West II	April 14, 1998	6497-060	2.61
Moesha starts paying for her own telephone, cable and new furniture and Frank is happy that he doesn't have to pay for it, but Dee doesn't like what she sees.
58	20	"This Time You've Gone Too Far"	Henry Chan	Demetrius Andre Bady	April 28, 1998	6497-056	2.73
Moesha and her friends all decide to take a road trip to Sea World, but their trip ends after Chris causes them to get kicked out of the amusement park. They all decide to travel to Mexico instead of going home. While in Mexico, the gang enjoys themselves until Moesha loses Morgan's car keys and Moesha is faced with having to call her parents. Meanwhile, much to Frank's chagrin, Dee invites J.W. and Andell over for dinner to celebrate the anniversary of Frank and Dee's first date.
59	21	"Body Language"	Henry Chan	Ron Neal	May 5, 1998	6497-057	3.16
While playing a friendly game of Truth or Dare, Kim and Niecy dare a naive Moesha to get a tattoo. She reluctantly agrees to go through with it on the condition that Kim and Niecy go with her. After learning that Kim really didn't get her nose pierced and Niecy didn't get anything at all, a newly-branded Moesha must now face her father. Trying to stay cool and calm, Frank goes along with Dee's plans of letting Moesha grow up, but he accidentally tells Moesha his opinion of her. Meanwhile, Hakeem takes a second job at The Den, but he unknowingly mixes Andell's imported colon cleanser mix into the smoothies and serves them to customers.
60	22	"Pajama Jam"	Henry Chan	Fred Johnson	May 12, 1998	6497-059	3.06
Morgan throws a co-ed slumber party and invites Moesha, Hakeem, Kim and Niecy. Mary Ellen desperately tries to get into the party but is refused admission. Moesha sees Jeremy and finally decides to talk to him. Dee and Frank try to have a romantic night in but their plans are interrupted by a phone call.
61	23	"A House is Not a Home"	Henry Chan	Ron Neal	May 19, 1998	6497-061	2.83
After leaving home, Moesha turns to Andell for the night. Although she promises Andell she'll go back home the next day, she surprises Andell by staying at The Den the following day. Upset that Moesha lied to her, Andell forces Moesha to talk to Frank, but nothing's changed between them forcing Moesha to move out permanently. Back at Andell's, Moesha becomes a bother to Andell and her new beau, Uncle Bernie. Note: This marks the final time Fredro Starr's character, Quinton "Q" Brooks, is listed as a main character.

=== Season 4 (1998–99) ===
- Fredro Starr is no longer part of the main cast. Although he makes a guest appearance in one episode.
- Jon Huertas joined the season in a recurring role.
- This is Countess Vaughn's last season of the show.
- The opening theme song received a complete overhaul which remained for the rest of the series’ run.

No. overall	No. in season	Title	Directed by	Written by	Original release date	Prod. code	Viewers (millions)
62	1	"Moesha Meets Brandy"	Henry Chan	Sara V. Finney	October 6, 1998	6498-062	3.84
Five months since their fight, Moesha still hasn't returned home in light of the way things are between her and Frank. After Kim forgets to purchase tickets to a sold-out concert featuring R&B singer Brandy, Moesha decides to spend her weekend alone with her new beau, Aaron, a college student whom she met over the summer. After Moesha makes strange suggestions in an effort to advance the relationship further, the two break up. Later, Moesha, Kim, Niecy, and Hakeem attempt to get into the concert. Backstage, Moesha meets Brandy, who gives her some advice. Brandy appears as herself in a dual role.
63	2	"Homecoming"	Henry Chan	Vida Spears	October 13, 1998	6498-063	2.61
With Moesha gone and the rest of the family bickering constantly, Myles is having a hard time dealing with the way things are at home. He hatches a plan to get the family back together. Meanwhile, Grandma Mitchell (Lynn Hamilton) and Uncle Bernie visit to help Frank celebrate his big day. In the end, he lets Moesha move back home and finish her senior year at Crenshaw. Note: In a break from the format which was typical of Moesha at the time, Myles opens and closes this episode by speaking his thoughts into a diary, rather than Moesha, and he closes his remarks at the end of the episode by saying he's turning the ritual back over to her.
64	3	"Hello, What's This?"	Henry Chan	Fred Johnson	October 20, 1998	6498-064	3.76
When Frank and Dee find a marijuana cigarette in the house, all clues point to Moesha. Once Frank and Dee learn they're wrong, they and Moesha are shocked to learn that the joint belongs to Myles.
65	4	"Psyche Your Mind"	Henry Chan	Jacque Edmonds	October 27, 1998	6498-065	3.40
Dee convinces the family to join Myles in a family therapy session, but Moesha decides to ditch the session to hang out with her friends. Frank reschedules the session so that everyone can attend and everyone begins to open up and express their feelings towards one another.
66	5	"Teacher"	Henry Chan	Ralph R. Farquhar	November 3, 1998	6498-066	3.12
A new teacher starts work at Crenshaw High, and Moesha makes a bold move and kisses him. Worrying about the consequences connected to teacher-student relationships, Channing decides to leave Crenshaw High for good.
67	6	"I Know What You Did in the 3rd Grade"	Henry Chan	T. Smith III & James E. West II	November 10, 1998	6498-069	4.01
Moesha, Kim and Hakeem think a bully named Devon Stamps, from their third grade class, is stalking them, due to a practical joke that turned ugly.
68	7	"A Terrible Thing Happened on My Tour of College"	Henry Chan	Calvin Brown, Jr.	November 17, 1998	6498-067	4.25
Musical guest: Big Pun; Moesha and her friends visit Charisse, Moesha's cousin, at Maynard University during Prospective Freshman Weekend. While there, they tour the entire campus and meet new friends (Iris and Mervin) as well as Moesha's ex-boyfriend Aaron. Old sparks flame again for Moesha and Aaron, but she becomes more interested in Mervin. Later, Mervin slips Moesha a drug in her drink, but Aaron comes to her rescue. Meanwhile, Myles has a slumber party.
69	8	"Birth Control"	Erma Elzy-Jones	Mara Brock Akil	November 24, 1998	6498-068	3.7
When Nicey reveals that she is the first one of the group to have sex, a curious Moesha visits a health clinic to find answers to her questions. She is prescribed birth control pills which Dee finds resulting in a talk about sex. Moesha meets Aaron for a romantic night but all doesn't go as planned.
70	9	"A Class Act Christmas"	Shirley Jo Finney	Ron Neal	December 15, 1998	6498-070	3.59
Moesha and Hakeem are bummed to learn that Eddie have them working on Christmas Eve. She tries to find a good excuse so that she can finish her last-minute shopping. An elder man visits the store to apply for a job, but Eddie tells him that they haven't hired anyone new in a while. Later, the unemployed man is now dressed as Santa Claus and holds the entire store hostage.
71	10	"The Crush"	Ed Greenberg	Demetrius Andre Bady	January 19, 1999	6498-072	3.82
Andell holds a tutoring program at The Den, and Moesha decides to write an article about the tutoring sessions in hopes of winning a newspaper's journalism contest. One of Myles' friends named Justin reveals a story that he has trouble reading (only so he can be around Moesha). So, Moesha decides to write a story on Justin's illiteracy but she forgets one important thing-- she didn't check the facts after Justin lied about not being able to read. Meanwhile, Frank goes on a diet after he becomes slightly overweight.
72	11	"Barking Up the Wrong Tree"	Henry Chan	Silvia Cardenas	January 26, 1999	6498-071	3.54
Moesha worries a lot about Hakeem that since he took the job as Assistant Manager for Clayton, he's not gonna go to college, so with no choice, Moesha decides to confront his mother Ms. Bernetta Campbell. Meanwhile, Myles gets a dog for his gift but realizes that it's a lot of responsibilities as he thought it would be.
73	12	"Life Imitating Art"	Henry Chan	Silvia Cardenas	February 9, 1999	6497-076	3.47
During Black History Month, Moesha and students divide along racial lines after a protest over the lack of black representation in Antonio's mural of Mexican-American migrant workers. Meanwhile, Myles tries to win a new bike in a contest.
74	13	"Ohmigod, Fanatic"	Henry Chan	Mara Brock Akil	February 16, 1999	6498-075	3.8
Musical guest: LeAnn Rimes; Moesha and Kim have a fight over Kim's unprepared college plans. Later, MTV's "FANatic" picks Moesha to escort Kim to meet country singer LeAnn Rimes. LeAnn Rimes gives Kim and Moesha some good advice on how to remain good friends. Meanwhile, Hakeem accidentally sees Dee naked.
75	14	"The Rite Stuff"	Henry Chan	Fred Johnson	February 23, 1999	6498-073	4.01
Moesha and her friends participate in The Ladies of Eminence Debutante Ball, and it gets controversial when one of them who gets knocked gets cut from the Ball as a contestant.
76	15	"I Love Moesha"	Henry Chan	Calvin Brown, Jr.	March 2, 1999	6498-074	3.98
Moesha's singing dilemma is illustrated in a 1950s-style sitcom episode, a la "I Love Lucy," about an audition for a Broadway revue.
77	16	"Home is Where the Car Is"	Henry Chan	T. Smith III & James E. West II	March 9, 1999	6498-077	3.62
Moesha is envious of a gifted, yet reclusive, classmate who is named valedictorian but she also learns about his Humble Beginnings. Meanwhile, Frank thinks Myles is ready for the "talk."
78	17	"Girls' Night In"	William Allen Young	Tamiko K. Brooks & Njeri Njuhigu & Wayne Stamps	March 30, 1999	6498-080	3.17
With their Senior year nearing an end, Moesha throws a slumber party with her girls, Kim and Niecy, to reflect on the good times they've spent together before they leave for college. Note: This episode serves as a clip show.
79	18	"It Takes Two"	Stan Lathan	Ralph R. Farquhar & Vida Spears & Sara V. Finney	April 27, 1999	6498-081	2.83
With the help of Dee, Kim's mother Nikki (Mo'Nique) decides to complete her high school diploma, an opportunity she missed due to her pregnancy with Kim. But Kim is in for a shock when she learns that her mother wants to expand her education-- with her. Note 1: This episode served as the backdoor pilot episode for the spin-off series The Parkers. Note 2: Even though Brandy who plays Moesha Mitchell does not appear in the entire episode she appears in the beginning and the end of this episode to tell the story about Kim and Nikki.
80	19	"Had to Be You"	Henry Chan	Demetrius Andre Bady	May 4, 1999	6498-078	2.83
Musical guest: Johnny Gill; An old flame from Andell's past tries to rekindle with her. Meanwhile, Frank overreacts to Dee's urge to keep a picture of a young man from her past.
81	20	"The Prom"	Tony Singletary	Lena D. Wilson	May 11, 1999	6498-082	3.04
Musical guest: Silk; It's the Senior year Prom, but when Moesha's date lands in the hospital hours before the big night, Moesha has a Cinderella night encounter, and tries to find him via his custom made button. Note: This episode marks the final appearance of Jon Huertas as Antonio
82	21	"Independence Day"	Erma Elzy-Jones	Jacque Edmonds	May 18, 1999	6498-079	2.78
Moesha's surprise 18th birthday is full of surprises when all of her exes show up one by one, wanting to get back together with her. Special guest star: Fredro Starr as Quinton 'Q' Brooks Note: Fredro Starr's character as Quinton 'Q' Brooks was credited as a recurring character for the rest of this season.
83	22	"I Studied Twelve Years for This?"	Henry Chan	Calvin Brown, Jr.	May 25, 1999	6498-083	2.54
Moesha, Hakeem and Niecy go for a graduation day brunch in Beverly Hills, where an unexpected complication happens an hour before the big event. A post grad opportunity is offered to Moesha, but she has to make sacrifice in order to accept it. Note: This episode marks the final appearance of Countess Vaughn as Kim Parker.

=== Season 5 (1999–2000) ===
- Ray J. Norwood, who is also Brandy's brother, joins the cast as a series regular.
- Countess Vaughn is no longer part of the main cast.
- This is Yvette Wilson's last season of the show.
- Fredro Starr makes a guest appearance in two episodes.
- This is Sheryl Lee Ralph's last season as part of the main cast.

No. overall	No. in season	Title	Directed by	Written by	Original release date	Prod. code	Viewers (millions)
84	1	"Good Vibrations?"	Henry Chan	Vida Spears	August 23, 1999	6499-084	3.96
Musical guest: Mary J. Blige; After deciding to foregoing Northwestern, Moesha is now working at "Vibe Magazine" She tries to play it off as she is doing great to impress her friends and family, but not hiding the fact she is still a gopher. Dorian, Frank's nephew and Moesha and Myles's troublesome cousin escapes Oakland and secretly move to Crenshaw to seek refuge. Note: This episode marks the first appearance of Ray J. Norwood as Dorian Long.
85	2	"Fired Up"	Henry Chan	Warren Hutcherson	August 30, 1999	6499-085	3.35
In her new job, Moesha manages to set up an interview with Dr. Maya Angelou and convinces Niecy to be her secretary.
86	3	"The Party's Over (Here)"	Henry Chan	Jacque Edmonds	September 6, 1999	6499-086	3.52
On her first week of California University, Moesha and Niecy become regulars on the college party circuit. Meanwhile, Myles, influenced by Dorian to change his image to impress his classmates during his first week of middle school.
87	4	"Mis-directed Study"	Henry Chan	Fred Johnson	September 13, 1999	6499-087	3.18
Moesha lands a job tutoring athletes. She gets assigned to a promising NBA candidate named Ray Meadows. Ray has to write an English paper. Ray asks Moesha to finish the paper for him because he's too busy with practice and studying plays. Moesha agrees to write it, since they're friends. Dorian sees Moesha's writing Ray's paper and teases her, claiming that he uses the same game with girls at his school. Moesha reconsiders writing the paper and tells Ray that she can not do his paper for him. Upset, Ray tells her that he's not interested in a friendship with her if he can't benefit from it.
88	5	"Not My Pumpkin"	Henry Chan	Silvia Cardenas	September 20, 1999	6499-088	3.44
After Frank discovers a bottle of birth control pills, he is livid to discover that they are Moesha's. He struggles to forgive Dee for her deception and Moesha for taking the pills. Later a talk from Andell helps him to re-evaluate his opinions. Meanwhile, Moesha stands up for Dorian when he's wrongfully accused of stealing.
89	6	"Just Above My Head"	Henry Chan	Demetrius Andre Bady	October 4, 1999	6499-089	3.54
Moesha and Niecy are taking history from Professor Ward, but they don't appreciate his racial disparaging jokes. Meanwhile, Dorian has problems with somebody at school; Frank and Dee confront Dorian for his missing school classes.
90	7	"A Den is a Terrible Thing to Waste"	Henry Chan	T. Smith III & James E. West II	October 18, 1999	6499-090	3.73
When Moesha hears that Andell is losing The Den, she tries to save it and succeeds only for Andell to be displeased with her efforts. Andell tells Moesha that she wants a change from The Den and sells it. The gang say goodbye to The Den. Meanwhile, Dorian gets in a fight and ends up in the doghouse. Guest Star: Jenifer Lewis
91	8	"Isn't She Lovely?"	Henry Chan	Jacque Edmonds	November 8, 1999	6499-091	3.69
Moesha prepares for the homecoming dance but "friends" Moesha and Hakeem soon start to realize that the depth of their friendship may be reaching a new and unexpected level. Meanwhile, Myles disappoints Frank after selling the comic books that Frank handed down to him for his birthday.
92	9	"Unappreciated Interest"	Henry Chan	Warren Hutcherson	November 15, 1999	6499-092	3.57
Moesha and Niecy's friendship is tested when Piper moves out and Moesha moves in. Moesha later becomes a bother to Niecy. Meanwhile, Dorian tries to get away with purchasing extra items on Frank's credit card and lying about it, leading to Frank to give Dorian a tough ultimatum.
93	10	"Thanksgiving"	Erma Elzy-Jones	Silvia Cardenas	November 22, 1999	6499-093	3.56
With Dee sick in bed, Moesha finds herself in a fierce Thanksgiving cooking competition with Mrs. Campbell. Also, Dorian's mother visits, but Dorian believes that she likes adjusting to her new life without him.
94	11	"To Sleep, Perchance to Dream"	William Allen Young	Fred Johnson	December 6, 1999	6499-094	3.95
Moesha starts to dream about Hakeem kissing her and is disturbed when Nicey tells her that dreams reveal a person's true feelings. When she backs out of a ski trip for the three of them, Nicey forces her to talk to Hakeem.
95	12	"He Doth Protest Too Much"	Henry Chan	Beverly D. Hunter	January 3, 2000	6499-095	4.22
Dorian protests the elimination of the girls basketball team from the school budget to impress one of the players. Meanwhile, Moesha is having trouble in her chemistry class and is too proud to ask Niecy (who receives an "A" in the class) for help. Note: Moesha always speaks her thoughts in her diary to start off and end every episode in the series, and this episode marks her final diary entry.
96	13	"Let's Talk About Sex"	Henry Chan	Lamont Ferrell & Norman Vance, Jr.	January 24, 2000	6499-096	4.00
Moesha stays the weekend with Niecy in her dorm but she doesn't like the idea of Niecy inviting a stranger over who seems to want more from Niecy than just a new friendship. Meanwhile, Mo explains the facts of life to Dorian after catching him getting amorous with a girl while the rest of the family is away at a wedding.
97	14	"Secrets & Lies"	Henry Chan	T. Smith III & James E. West II	February 7, 2000	6499-097	4.62
Odd-ball Aunt Hattie comes to visit Frank, revealing a life changing secret to the entire family. Meanwhile, Moesha tells her family that she will be moving onto campus.
98	15	"Color Him Father"	Henry Chan	Warren Hutcherson	February 14, 2000	6499-098	4.06
As the tension continues to rise, Frank thinks that the only way that's possible to break some of the hostility is to let Dorian have his birthday party at a teen club. Sandy visits to find out why Frank told Dorian the secret and why he didn't wait as they both planned. Meanwhile, Moesha meets her new roommate, Theresa Logan (Marissa Jaret Winokur), from Dillingham, Alaska.
99	16	"Family Affair"	Henry Chan	Jacque Edmonds	February 21, 2000	6499-100	3.92
Frank is the honoree at a 'Businessman of the Year' banquet, but the tribute loses its luster when he learns that Moesha and Dorian don't want to go. After receiving vital advice, Moesha comes to her senses and forgives her father.
100	17	"The Matchmaker"	Henry Chan	Silvia Cardenas	March 20, 2000	6499-099	3.74
Moesha plays matchmaker for Theresa (Marissa Jaret Winokur) who's been having trouble meeting guys. So Mo decides to hook up Theresa with Hakeem's friend, Noel, but Mo thinks that Noel is just playing with Theresa's head. Meanwhile, Myles accidentally punches Dorian in the nose because of his unnecessary slurs towards Frank.
101	18	"Gimme a Break"	Ken Whittingham	Demetrius Andre Bady	April 10, 2000	6499-101	3.41
Musical guest: DMX; Moesha and Niecy go on a trip to Santa Barbara for their first spring break, but Moesha and Niecy's awaited trip is interrupted by the presence of two college students named Alicia and Joy, who both end up in the same hotel room as Mo and Niecy after the hotel accidentally over-booked them. After Alicia sees Moesha dancing with her ex-boyfriend Rodney, she spreads a rumor that Moesha slept around in Santa Barbara. Meanwhile, Dorian has trouble writing a history paper but plans to pass by using one of Mo's old papers.
102	19	"Something About Moesha"	Erma Elzy-Jones	Beverly D. Hunter	May 1, 2000	6499-102	2.74
While working at a fast-food restaurant, Dorian comes across a stranger by the name of Patience who offers him a job where he can earn "fast money". Meanwhile, Hakeem announces to Moesha and Niecy that he's moving in with girlfriend Tiffany, pushing to the surface some suppressed feelings between them.
103	20	"The Robbing Hood"	Henry Chan	Lamont Ferrell & Norman Vance, Jr.	May 8, 2000	6499-103	3.40
Dorian spends a weekend with Moesha, and all the residents in her dorm are robbed except for her who draws a conclusion that puts them at odds. Meanwhile, Myles doesn't appreciate his friends' comments about how "good" Dee looks. Note: This episode marks the final appearance of Yvette Wilson as Andell Wilkerson.
104	21	"Arriving Right on Q"	Ted Lange	Chandra D. Martin	May 15, 2000	6499-104	3.88
Moesha and Hakeem hit the first bump in their romance when Hakeem spends more time away from Moesha. But a surprise visit from old boyfriend Q makes Hakeem realize that he could lose her. Meanwhile, Frank gives Dorian the opportunity to work with him at his job, but later he gets arrested by the police for stealing a car from the Saturn lot and also with carrying $5,000. Special guest star: Fredro Starr as Quinton 'Q' Brooks
105	22	"D-Money Loses His Patience"	Henry Chan	T. Smith III & James E. West II	May 22, 2000	6499-105	4.58
Moesha is faced with the dilemma of going on tour with Q or staying at home with her family and her boyfriend Hakeem. But Moesha and Hakeem have an argument over the fact that Hakeem only wants Mo to stay home so that she won't have to go on tour with Q. Hurt over the fact that her boyfriend Gabe broke up with her, Niecy finds comfort from Hakeem. But they get caught up in the moment and share a kiss, just as Moesha enters the room. Stunned and hurt, Moesha takes Q up on his offer and leaves with him for New York. Meanwhile, Dorian's involvement with Patience gets him in over his head, forcing Frank to make a tough decision by enrolling him into a boot camp. Special guest star: Fredro Starr as Quinton 'Q' Brooks Note: This episode marks the final credit of Sheryl Lee Ralph as Dee Mitchell as a main character.

=== Season 6 (2000–01) ===
- Yvette Wilson and Sheryl Lee Ralph are no longer part of the main cast.
- Sheryl Lee Ralph makes a recurring appearance in seven episodes.
- Fredro Starr makes a guest appearance in two episodes.

No. overall	No. in season	Title	Directed by	Written by	Original release date	Prod. code	Viewers (millions)
106	1	"On the Rebound"	Henry Chan	Demetrius Andre Bady	September 4, 2000	6400-106	4.69
Moesha prolongs her stay in New York and is enjoying her relationship with Q, but soon decides to return home and to college. Q decides to pop the question. Meanwhile, Dorian returns from boot camp and reverts to his old ways forcing Frank to produce an army contract which shakes Dorian's and Frank's relationship. Special guest stars: Fredro Starr as Quinton 'Q' Brooks and Sheryl Lee Ralph as Dee Mitchell. Note: Sheryl Lee Ralph's character as Dee Mitchell was credited as a recurring character for the rest of this season.
107	2	"Bad Company"	Henry Chan	Beverly D. Hunter	September 11, 2000	6400-107	4.71
Moesha returns from New York with a secret that she wants to keep from her parents. Hakeem and Niecy attempt to make amends with her. After learning that Moesha and Q are now back together, Hakeem surprises Moesha with an emotional poem and a "promise ring" (in which he hopes that she'll forgive him again). Meanwhile, Dorian is still trying to earn Frank's trust when he dates one of Frank's mentors named Cleo who isn't the angel that she appears to be. Also, Dee prepares to leave for Jamaica for her education-consulting job. Special guest star: Sheryl Lee Ralph as Dee Mitchell.
108	3	"Netcam"	Henry Chan	T. Smith III & James E. West II	September 18, 2000	6400-108	4.07
Alicia hides an Internet camera in Moesha and Niecy's bedroom for profit; invading their privacy and showcasing them to the entire world. After Moesha receives a gift from Japan sent by Q, Hakeem tries to win her back with gifts as well. Meanwhile, Myles thinks he got a girl pregnant by dancing with her. Guest Star: Kyla Pratt
109	4	"Living in Paradise?"	Henry Chan	Warren Hutcherson	September 25, 2000	6400-109	4.31
Moesha can't stand the nasty and rude habits of her suite mates Niecy, Alicia and Brenda. So she tries to organize a meeting to establish "the rules," but a nearby appearance by the singing group Boyz II Men hurts attendance. Meanwhile, Dee returns home from Jamaica but has to break the news to the family that she's decided to stay in Jamaica full-time to work on her education-consulting job. Special guest stars: Sheryl Lee Ralph as Dee Mitchell, Boyz II Men
110	5	"You Say He's Just a Friend"	Henry Chan	Lamont Ferrell & Norman Vance, Jr.	October 2, 2000	6400-111	3.62
Hakeem and Niecy suspect that Moesha is creeping around with Jamal, her study partner. After going out on a date with Jamal, Moesha later stays the night with Jamal; leading to major suspicion between the two. Also, Moesha receives gifts from Q and a video-message from Khalib stating that he misses her and wants to keep in touch with her. Meanwhile, Dorian turns Frank's kitchen into a barbershop.
111	6	"Just the Two of Us"	Henry Chan	Cynthia R. Harris & Raynelle Swilling	October 9, 2000	6400-110	3.93
When Frank and Dorian leave on a road trip to Las Vegas, Myles is sent to stay in Moesha's dorm where he develops a crush on Alicia. But Alicia lets Myles believe that she likes him and uses Myles to run errands for her. Meanwhile, Frank and Dorian, on their way to Las Vegas, try to resolve their conflicting issues toward each other.
112	7	"The Nutty Moesha"	Erma Elzy-Jones	Chandra D. Martin	October 30, 2000	6400-112	3.71
In this hilarious Halloween episode, while trying to juggle studying, taking care of her family while Dee's away and planning for her Halloween party, Moesha, along with Niecy, starts using energy-raising vitamins to help her with mid-terms, but the vitamins cause some peculiar side effects. Meanwhile, Dorian becomes a dog trainer for a neighbor's dog named Frisky. But when he can't seem to keep the dog from barking and growling, things get ugly. Guest Star: Sinbad
113	8	"The Candidate"	Ted Lange	Beverly D. Hunter	November 6, 2000	6400-113	3.39
NAACP president Kweisi Mfume visits Moesha's campus to address to students about the importance of voting. When Moesha's former Girl Scout leader gives a speech on her candidacy for city council, Moesha, Hakeem, Niecy and Jerome are convinced to help her campaign. But when her interaction with Hakeem proves contrary to her projected image, the volunteers are forced with a tough decision. Meanwhile, when a mother of Myles' classmate finds out that Dee is out of town, she wastes no time making her move on Frank until neighbor and good friend Nikki Parker steps in. Also, Moesha accidentally tells Hakeem that she's engaged to Q.
114	9	"Definitely Not the Cosbys"	Henry Chan	T. Smith III & James E. West II	November 13, 2000	6400-115	3.30
Moesha tells her father about her engagement to Q and furious he storms out. He later finds Dorian's date in their house wearing his robe. Dee calls from Jamaica to wish Frank a happy anniversary and he daydreams about what his life would like if they were the Huxtables. Special guest star: Sheryl Lee Ralph as Dee Mitchell.
115	10	"All This and Turkey, Too"	Erma Elzy-Jones	Jacque Edmonds	November 20, 2000	6400-114	3.61
After a three-month separation, Q comes to visit Moesha, along with Khalib, for Thanksgiving. Dee's father, Arthur Loving, visits as well and brings along with him his grudge towards Frank. As Moesha and Q make up for time spent apart, Q makes an odd request involving her engagement ring. (Q needs the ring to help finance some new rap group he's producing.) Khalib advises his help and concern for Moesha and offers to lend them the money. But when Moesha tells Q the news, he overreacts; leading to the end of their engagement. Special guest stars: Fredro Starr as Quinton 'Q' Brooks, Sheryl Lee Ralph as Dee Mitchell, and Robert Guillaume as Dee's father Arthur. Note: This episode marks the final appearance of Fredro Starr as Quinton "Q" Brooks.
116	11	"The Player"	William Allen Young	Cynthia R. Harris & Raynelle Swilling	December 11, 2000	6400-116	3.65
Moesha tries to set up Niecy with Hakeem's friend, Troy (Tyrese Gibson), but problems occur when Moesha learns that Troy is Alicia's boyfriend. Meanwhile, Frank leaves Dorian and Myles home alone for the first time.
117	12	"All Grown Up"	Henry Chan	Demetrius Andre Bady	January 15, 2001	6400-120	3.51
Hakeem gets his first apartment with roommate Jerome. Moesha and Niecy stop by and they all reminisce on the times they've spent together from their teen years to adulthood, including Hakeem's frequent visits to the Mitchells' home, Kim's obsession for him, and his romantic relationship with best friend/ex-girlfriend Moesha
118	13	"Run, Mo, Run"	Ken Whittingham	Lamont Ferrell & Norman Vance, Jr.	February 5, 2001	6400-117	3.43
Moesha fears for her life after openly criticizing a poet at "Poetry Night at The Pendulum." Meanwhile, Dorian starts a new job working at a recording studio, but Frank thinks that all of Dorian's long hours at work may affect his schoolwork. After an argument between Dorian and Frank, Dorian secretly tries to search for his birth mother. He asks for Moesha's help. After she reluctantly decides over night, Moesha agrees to help Dorian. By helping him, she retrieves Dorian's birth certificate stating his mother's maiden name: Barbara Dolores Lee.
119	14	"Mom"	Ken Whittingham	Chandra D. Martin	February 12, 2001	6400-118	3.91
Moesha continues to help Dorian search for his birth mother despite Hakeem's warnings of the consequences. They track down Dorian's mother, Barbara Kennedy who has some shocking revelations for Moesha. Meanwhile, Frank is challenged to a race by Myles' friend's uncle.
120	15	"That's My Mama"	Henry Chan	Eric Monte	February 19, 2001	6400-119	3.94
Frank come to Moesha's dorm and confronts her about her help in finding Dorian's mother. They have a discussion about his marriage to her mother. Dorian goes to see his biological mother and ends up baby-sitting for her children who are more than a handful. Barbara and Dorian decide to take their relationship slowly. Guest Star: Golden Brooks
121	16	"What If...?"	Henry Chan	Chandra D. Martin	February 26, 2001	6400-122	3.57
Dorian is the perfect son and Moesha is a vagabond when Mo ponders what would have happened if Frank stayed with Barbara.
122	17	"Scary Marriage"	Henry Chan	Michael Ajakwe Jr.	March 5, 2001	6400-123	3.24
A class that calls on Moesha, Hakeem and company to examine gender roles in marriage leads to a disturbing experience for Moesha. Niecy isn't too thrilled about being partnered with Hakeem. Meanwhile, Dorian comes up with an inventive way to record a demo for his band.
123	18	"Saving Private Rita"	Henry Chan	Lamont Ferrell & Norman Vance, Jr.	March 12, 2001	6400-121	3.42
Moesha, Hakeem and Niecy must help a troubled student named Rita who is contemplating suicide. Meanwhile, Dorian courts a minister's daughter.
124	19	"Mayhem at the Jam"	Henry Chan	Cynthia R. Harris & Raynelle Swilling	March 19, 2001	6400-124	3.52
Moesha organizes a campus concert with Hakeem, Niecy, Jerome and Alicia, but when the main act, "Mayhem", is late, Dorian's group "What" takes the stage to appease the crowd. But when "Mayhem" finds out that they've been bumped back, the result turns to a fight leaving Hakeem in the hospital. Later, Moesha realizes that she is still in love with Hakeem. Dorien attempts to get Lenae, the producer of the record company to pick up a demo of the group. The two also get close to each other also.
125	20	"Creepin'"	Henry Chan	Ilunga Adell	April 16, 2001	6400-125	2.71
Moesha develops writer's block and turns to Hakeem for help in turn developing a mutual attraction for each other. Hakeem becomes confused about their relationship but after a talk he makes a public declaration. Meanwhile, Frank is upset that Dorian is skipping school to go to the beach with his older girlfriend.
126	21	"Graduation Day"	Henry Chan	Jasmine Love	May 7, 2001	6400-126	2.58
It's Dorian's graduation and his family wants to throw him a party but he has other commitments. Meanwhile, Hakeem gets into trouble with Moesha. Special guest star: Sheryl Lee Ralph as Dee Mitchell
127	22	"Paying the Piper"	Henry Chan	Donelle Q. Buck	May 14, 2001	6400-127	2.91
In the series finale, Dorian gives Myles a tour around the recording studio when his former acquaintance, Lamont, arrives. Later, Lamont visits Dorian and demands his half of "What!." Dorian refuses again, and Lamont becomes even more threatening. That night, Frank and Dee are frantic when Myles fails to return home. Elsewhere, Hakeem makes Moesha a proposal and she can't decide what to do about it so asks her roommates for advice. One of the girls finds out she's pregnant. Special guest star: Sheryl Lee Ralph as Dee Mitchell Note: This episode and the series ends on an unresolved cliffhanger.
