= Mama Said Knock You Out (disambiguation) =

Mama Said Knock You Out is a 1990 album by LL Cool J.

Mama Said Knock You Out may also refer to:

- "Mama Said Knock You Out" (song), a 1990 song by LL Cool J
- "Mama Said Knock You Out", a 1995 episode of New York Undercover
- "Mama Said Knock You Out", a 1996 episode of Moesha
- "Mama Said Knock You Out", a 2004 episode of Yes, Dear
- "Mama Said Knock You Out", a 2014 episode of the third season of Scandal
