= Henry Chan =

American television director

- Other name: Henry F. Chan
- Occupations: Television director, editor
- Years active: 1984–present

Henry F. Chan (Chinese: 陳發中) is an American television director and editor. He has directed over 200 episodes of television shows for all major US networks, including The Fresh Beat Band, Lizzie McGuire, Big Time Rush, Imagination Movers, and The Suite Life of Zack & Cody.

== Career ==
Early in his career, Chan won a Primetime Emmy Award in 1986 for editing the sitcom The Cosby Show; he was also nominated again the following year. He later made his TV directorial debut, directing A Different World.

Chan has since directed episodes of several shows, including The Ms. Pat Show, Bigger, The Comedy Get Down, Cooper Barrett's Guide to Surviving Life, Fresh Off the Boat, Zoe Ever After, A to Z, Growing Up Fisher, The Neighbors, Whitney, Don't Trust the B— in Apartment 23, 10 Things I Hate About You, Let's Stay Together, Kitchen Confidential, Living Single, Moesha, The Parkers, Girlfriends, The King of Queens, Scrubs, and Lizzie McGuire.

In 2003, he directed his first film, Gas, starring Flex Alexander and Khalil Kain. In 2013, he directed his first Chinese-language film, 100 Days (真愛100天), in Taiwan. Chan's Chinese comedy series Rich House, Poor House (王子富愁记) aired on Youku in January 2018.
