= Lamont Bentley =

American actor (1973–2005)

- Born: October 25, 1973; Milwaukee, Wisconsin, U.S.
- Died: January 19, 2005 (aged 31); Ventura County, California, U.S.
- Resting place: Forest Lawn Memorial Park, Hollywood Hills
- Occupations: Actor; rapper
- Years active: 1989–2005
- Children: 2

Lamont Bentley (October 25, 1973 – January 19, 2005) was an American actor and rapper best known for his role as Hakeem Campbell on the UPN sitcom Moesha. Bentley was also known for his role as Crazy K in the 1995 horror film Tales from the Hood and C-Money in the 2001 film The Wash featuring Dr. Dre and Snoop Dogg.

== Early life ==
Lamont Bentley was born in Milwaukee, Wisconsin on October 25, 1973, the son of Donald Gardison and Loyce Bentley. Lamont grew up on Milwaukee's north side of town and attended Webster Middle School. He moved to Los Angeles with his mother, who wished to pursue a career as a professional singer.

== Career ==
Bentley dropped out of high school to pursue his own acting career, and had practiced autographs by the age of 12. He had to take odd jobs in movie theaters, a fish market, and a grocery store, among other places as he waited for his big break. His appearance enabled him to play the part of teens even into his twenties, and he landed a variety of small parts in television series and movies before landing bigger roles.

Debuting in a 1986 Starburst commercial, he began his career as a child actor appearing in television commercials and guest spots on various television series before landing a role on the series South Central in 1994. His first feature film role came in the 1995 horror movie Tales from the Hood, about the inner-city ganglands, an anthology of four stories focused on the consequences of the gang lifestyle. In that particular film, he played Crazy K, a cold and angry character. He once played a teenage father who opted to stay home with his child instead of turn out for the high school football team in a public service television announcement. In 1995, South Central creator Ralph Farquhar cast Bentley in the series Moesha as Hakeem Campbell, the always hungry friend of Moesha, which ran for six seasons on UPN.

After Moesha ended, Bentley continued acting while pursuing a career as a rapper in the recording group UPRIZE with Marché Meeks aka "Cartier" and Tyson Pearson "Typhoon". In 2001, he appeared as C-Money in The Wash opposite Dr. Dre and Snoop Dogg. That same year, he portrayed Tupac Shakur in the television biopic Too Legit: The MC Hammer Story. Bentley made one of his last onscreen appearances in Spike Lee's crime drama Sucker Free City.

== Death ==
Shortly after midnight on January 19, 2005, Bentley was driving alone when he was killed in a single-car accident in southern California's Ventura County. He was driving on Highway 118 near Simi Valley (30 miles northwest of Los Angeles). Witnesses to the accident stated that Bentley's vehicle was travelling at a high speed towards the Rocky Peak Fire Road off ramp. After running through a stop sign, the vehicle went through a chain-link fence situated across the street and rolled down an embankment. Bentley was ejected from the vehicle into traffic where five cars struck him. He sustained multiple blunt force injuries and was pronounced dead at 12:23 a.m. Bentley was survived by his two daughters and his mother Loyce Bentley. A memorial service for Bentley was held at Forest Lawn Memorial Home in Hollywood Hills, on January 24, 2005. He was buried at Forest Lawn Memorial Park, Hollywood Hills.

== Filmography ==
=== Film ===
Year	Title	Role	Notes
1995	Tales from the Hood	Crazy K	
1997	Buffalo Soldiers	Corporal Sea	TV movie
1999	The Breaks	Darryl	
2001	Gabriela	Nick	
2001	The Wash	C-Money	
2001	Too Legit: The MC Hammer Story	Tupac Shakur	TV movie
2004	Shards	Thomas	Short
2004	Sucker Free City	Ahmir	TV movie
2005	Wifey	-	Video
2005	The Tenants	Male Partygoer	
2009	A Day in the Life	L Mob	

=== Television ===
Year	Title	Role	Notes
1989	Duet	Snake	Episode: "Brother from Another Zip Code"
1990	Gabriel's Fire	Teen	Episode: "Windows"
1991	Equal Justice	Childs	Episode: "Courting Disaster"
1991	Adam-12	Snake	Episode: "Homeless in America"
1994	South Central	Rashad	Recurring Cast
1995	Family Matters	Andre Corleone	Episode: "An Unlikely Match"
1995	CBS Schoolbreak Special	Dom	Episode: "What About Your Friends"
1995	The Parent 'Hood	Damon	Episode: "Robert in the 'Hood"
1995	Courthouse	Raymond	Episode: "One Flew Over the Courthouse"
1996	The Client	K-Boy-Kool	Episode: "Motherless Child"
1996–2001	Moesha	Hakeem Campbell	Main cast
1997	Soul Train	Himself/Guest Host	Episode: "Outkast/Rahsaan Patterson/Roger & Zapp"
1997	The Sentinel	Marcus Watson	Episode: "Pennies from Heaven"
1998	NYPD Blue	Arnell	Episode: "Honeymoon at Viagra Falls"
1999	Clueless	Hakeem Campbell	Episode: "Prom Misses, Prom Misses"
1999–2002	The Parkers	Hakeem Campbell	Guest cast (seasons 1–2; 4)
2000	Soul Food	Pruitt	Episode: "Bad Luck"
2002	The Proud Family	Gary (Voice)	Episode: "Hip-Hop Helicopter"
