= Erma Elzy =

American director

Erma Elzy-Jones
- Born: Los Angeles, California, U.S.
- Other names: Erma Elzy
- Occupations: Television and theatre director
- Years active: 1985-present

Erma Elzy, formerly Erma Elzy-Jones is an American television and theatre director.

== Career ==
Elzy (formerly Elzy-Jones) was born in Los Angeles, California. She began her career in television, working as Production Associate/Script Supervisor on the television series Double Trouble, 227, ALF and The Fresh Prince of Bel-Air. She would go to become an Associate Director and later make her official directorial debut directing an episode of Moesha. Her other television credits are Sister, Sister, The Wayans Bros., The Parkers, Girlfriends and That's So Raven.

During much of the 2000s she focused more on directing short films and stage productions. In 2001, she directed the short film Room 302 starring Kristin Bauer. Other film credits include Man Made (2002) and Silent Crisis: Diabetes Among Us, a television documentary which was hosted and narrated by Debbie Allen. Her theatre credits are The Great Nebula In Orion (2002), It's a Good Thing I Knew How To Dance (2003) and Yesterday Came Too Soon…The Dorothy Dandridge Story.

In 2007, Elzy-Jones won a Roy W. Dean Film and Video Grant for work on the documentary film Colorblind Or Blinded By Color?: The State of Black Equality In America.

In 2011 she produced, wrote and directed the short feature "Redeemer".
