= William Allen Young =

American actor and director (born 1954)

- Born: January 24, 1954 (age 72); Washington, D.C., U.S.
- Occupations: Actor; director
- Years active: 1979–present
- Spouse: Helen Patrice Moore (m. 1986)
- Children: 2

William Allen Young (born January 24, 1954) is an American actor and director who has starred in over 100 television, stage, and film projects, including two Academy Award-nominated films, A Soldier's Story and District 9. He is known for his roles as Frank Mitchell on the UPN sitcom Moesha, Dr. Rollie Guthrie on the CBS medical drama Code Black, and as Judge Joseph Ratner on CBS's CSI Miami. His other television credits include ABC's The Day After, General Hospital, CBS's Madam Secretary, JAG, Atlanta Child Murders, and The Women of Brewster Place, among other shows. He is also credited with helping to diversify the ranks of writers, actors, directors and producers in Hollywood through the landmark 2000 TV Network Agreement, which he helped broker while serving as a former co-chair of the African-American Steering Committee of the Directors Guild of America.

== Early life and education ==
Young was born in Washington, D.C. but grew up in South Central, Los Angeles, during the Civil Rights Movement. One of seven children, he was inspired by his mother, Mother Joan Walker of California Southwest Jurisdiction, a high-school dropout who worked as a maid before returning to school at night to get her diploma and a nursing license, which led to a career in the medical profession.

== Career ==
His acting career includes starring roles in the Academy Award-nominated film, A Soldier's Story, and in Women of Brewster Place, The Atlanta Child Murders, Simple Justice, Sins, Lock Up, and In the Belly of the Beast, and the award-winning Lifetime series Any Day Now. He guest starred in the 6th-season episode "Home Court Advantage" of Sister, Sister in 1999. Millions of viewers still recognize him as Frank Mitchell, the tough-but-loving father, on the hit TV show, Moesha, or as Chief Judge Ratner on CSI: Miami. Young has received critical praise for his stage performances in New York City and Los Angeles, and he has performed abroad in Africa, Austria, France, Italy, London, Sri Lanka, and Russia. Young appears in the movie District 9, filmed on location in South Africa, and released in August 2009. He starred as Harry Wentz on the Disney Channel Original Series Good Luck Charlie (2010-2014). In 2013, Young reunited with Moesha co-star Brandy Norwood on the season six episode, "The Blueprint" on the television show The Game. In 2013, Young made a guest appearance in Madam Secretary episode "The Show Must Go On" as United States Deputy Secretary of State Steven Cushing.

== Personal life ==
He has been married to Helen Patrice Moore since November 8, 1986. They have two children.

== Filmography ==
Year	Title	Role	Notes
1980	The Jeffersons	Ernie	Episode: "Florence's Cousin"
1982	Fame	Robert Summers	Episode: "Passing Grade"
1983	The Day After	Billy McCoy	
1984	A Soldier's Story	Private Henson	
1985	The Atlanta Child Murders	Withers	
1985	Jagged Edge	Greg Arnold	
1986	Wisdom	Agent Williamson	
1988	227	Tony Langford	Episode: "The Roommate"
1988	Amen	Roger Holloway	Episode: "Wedding Bell Blues"
1989	The Women of Brewster Place	Eugene	
1989	Lock Up	Braden	
1992	The Waterdance	Les	
1992	Spies Inc.	Rob	
1993	Home Improvement	Gus	Episode: "Arrivederci, Binford"
1994	Almost Dead	Henzes	
1994	Babylon 5	Jason Ironheart	
1994	The Sinbad Show	Curtis	Episode: "Adoption: Part 1"
1994	Diagnosis: Murder	Alexander Damon	Episode: "A Very Fatal Funeral"
1994	Drop Squad	George Truelove	
1995	Murphy Brown	Lawyer #1	Episode: "Murphy's Law"
1995	Divas	Louis	
1996–2001	Moesha	Frank Mitchell	Main Cast
1998	Sister, Sister	T.C. Banks	Episode: "Home Court Advantage", uncredited
2000	The Parkers	Frank Mitchell	Episode: "A Simple Plan"
2001	Soul Food	Coach John Robinson	Episode: "Never Can Say Goodbye"
2001–2002	Any Day Now	Clyde Turk Terhune	14 episodes
2003	Fear X	Agent Lawrence	
2003	The District	Reverend Hamilton	Episode: "Untouchable"
2003	The Agency	Police Interrogator	Episode: "Coventry"
2003	The Proud Family	Mr. Moody	Episode: "Pulp Boot Camp"
2004	JAG	Henry Kale	Episode: "Retrial"
2004–2006	CSI: Miami	Chief Judge Joseph Ratner	3 episodes
2005–2007	CSI: Crime Scene Investigation	Duane McWane	4 episodes
2008	Saving Grace	Robbery Detective	Episode: "This Is Way Too Normal For You"
2008	The Mentalist	Matt Etienne	Episode: "Red-Handed"
2009	District 9	Dirk Michaels	
2009	Medium	Wesley Judson	Episode: "You Give Me Fever"
2010	Castle	Jerry Camden	Episode: "Anatomy of a Murder"
2010	Detroit 1-8-7	Dr. Jonathan Dozier	Episode: "Home Invasion/Drive-By"
2011	Fatal Consequences	Thomas Shaw	
2011-2014	Good Luck Charlie	Harry Wentz	7 episodes
2013	The Game	Colonel Westbrook	3 episodes
2014–2019	General Hospital	Judge David Walters	4 episodes
2015–2018	Code Black	Dr. Rollie Guthrie	Main Cast
2018	Good Girls	Lawyer	2 episodes
2021–2023	9-1-1: Lone Star	Benjamin Williams	3 episodes
2022	CSI: Vegas	Professor Gene Morrow	Season 2 Episode 5: In Harm's Way
2024	S.W.A.T.	Coach Howie Kincaid	Season 8 Episode 1: Vanished
2026	Nemesis	Otis Overton	Season 1 Episode 2: Breaking Protocol, Episode 7 & 8
2026	Grey's Anatomy	Morris Haynes	Season 22 Episode 17: Through the Fire
