= Yvette Wilson =

American comedian (1964–2012)

- Born: Yvette Reneé Wilson; March 6, 1964; Los Angeles, California, U.S.
- Died: June 14, 2012 (aged 48); Los Angeles, California, U.S.
- Education: San Jose State University
- Occupations: Comedian, actress
- Years active: 1990–2012
- Known for: Lynette Armstrong-Russell on Thea; Andell Wilkerson on Moesha & The Parkers
- Spouse: Jerome Harry (m. 2001)
- Children: 2

Yvette Reneé Wilson (March 6, 1964 – June 14, 2012) was an American comedian and actress. She was known for her role as Andell Wilkerson, the owner of the local restaurant and hangout on the UPN sitcoms Moesha (1996–2001); and restaurant owner and Nikki's (played by Mo'Nique) best friend on its spinoff The Parkers (1999–2004). She had appeared in many comedy films such as House Party 3, Friday, and on Russell Simmons' Def Comedy Jam. She was also known for her role as Rita in the 1995 F. Gary Gray film Friday. Wilson died from cervical cancer at the age of 48.

== Early life ==
Before she started her career in the entertainment business, Wilson attended San Jose State University and majored in communications. In 1991 she was a contestant on the game show Supermarket Sweep.

Wilson first entered comedy when she lost a bet and had to perform as a stand-up comedian at a friend's club. She decided to make a living off comedy and never turned back.

== Career ==
Her big break came with Thea, a short-lived sitcom from 1993 to 1994. Thea was cancelled after 19 episodes but the show helped her get a role in House Party 3. In addition, Wilson also had a minor role in the 1995 comedy movie Friday as Smokey's blind date and appeared in films such as Poetic Justice, starring Janet Jackson, and the film parody Don't Be a Menace to South Central While Drinking Your Juice in the Hood.

In 1995, she got the most important role of her career: Andell Wilkerson, a supporting character on the sitcom Moesha, which starred one of her castmates from Thea, R&B singer Brandy Norwood. Wilson's Andell character was the owner of The Den, a local teen hot spot on the show. In 2000, she left Moesha for its spin-off The Parkers, where she also played Andell Wilkerson, who was the best friend of Mo'Nique's character Nikki Parker. After The Parkers ended, she went on to appear in shows like HBO's Def Comedy Jam and Fox Network shows. Wilson final acting role was in 2005's Ganked. She started her own company by the name Tigobitties Inc.

== Personal life and death ==
Wilson had two daughters and two grandchildren. She was married to record producer Jerome Harry from 2001 until her death in 2012. Wilson suffered from kidney disease, having survived a kidney transplant and regular dialysis, but eventually died from cervical cancer, which metastasized throughout her entire body.

Wilson died on June 14, 2012, aged 48. She was cremated, with no funeral services held.

== Filmography ==
=== Film ===
Year	Title	Role	Notes
1993	Poetic Justice	Colette	
1994	House Party 3	Esther	
1994	Blankman	Fat Girl	
1995	Friday	Rita	
1996	Don't Be a Menace	Nurse	
2005	Ganked	Physics Tutor	Video

=== Television ===
Year	Title	Role	Notes
1991	Showtime at the Apollo	Herself	Episode: "Episode #5.7"
1992	Def Comedy Jam	Herself	Episode: "Episode #1.1"
1992-93	In Living Color	Herself	Episode: "Trail Mix-a-Lot" & "Undigable Hosts"
1993-94	Thea	Lynette Armstrong-Russell	Main Cast
1996	Jungle Cubs	Katen (voice)	Episode: "Treasure of the Middle Jungle"
1996-2000	Moesha	Andell Wilkerson	Main Cast: Seasons 1-5
1997	The Jamie Foxx Show	Mary Jane	Episode: "Break Yourself, Fool"
1999-2004	The Parkers	Andell Wilkerson	Main Cast
2003	Intimate Portrait	Herself	Episode: "Mo'Nique"
2010	Life After	Herself	Episode: "Shar Jackson"
