= Tony Singletary =

American television director

- Occupation(s): Television director, stage manager
- Years active: 1977–2007

Tony Singletary is an American television director.

In 1977, he began his career as a stage manager on the sitcom What's Happening!!, then stage-managed for Good Times and The Jeffersons. He made his directorial debut on the series Busting Loose starring Adam Arkin. Throughout his career he amassed a number of television credits, namely The Cosby Show, Charles in Charge, One Day at a Time, Who's the Boss, Diff'rent Strokes, Silver Spoons, Gimme a Break!, Martin, Married... with Children, and 227 among other series.

In 1998, he directed his first and only film, High Freakquency starring John Witherspoon. The last television series he directed was the Nickelodeon sitcom Just Jordan.
