= Moesha =

American television sitcom (1996–2001)

- Genre: Sitcom; Comedy drama
- Created by: Ralph Farquhar; Sara V. Finney; Vida Spears
- Starring: Brandy Norwood; William Allen Young; Sheryl Lee Ralph; Countess Vaughn; Lamont Bentley; Shar Jackson; Marcus T. Paulk; Yvette Wilson; Fredro Starr; Ray J
- Theme music composer: Kurt Farquhar
- Opening theme: "Moesha Main Title" performed by Brandy
- Ending theme: "Moesha Closing Theme" (Instrumental)
- Composer: Kurt Farquhar
- Country of origin: United States
- Original language: English
- No. of seasons: 6
- No. of episodes: 127 (list of episodes)

Production
- Executive producers: Ralph Farquhar; Sara V. Finney; Vida Spears; Jacque Edmonds; Warren Hutcherson; Fred Johnson; Brandy Norwood
- Camera setup: Multi-camera
- Running time: 21–24 minutes
- Production companies: Regan Jon Productions; Saradipity Productions; Jump at the Sun Productions; Big Ticket Television

Original release
- Network: UPN
- Release: January 23, 1996 – May 14, 2001

Related
- The Parkers; Girlfriends

Moesha (/moʊˈiːʃə/, MOH-EE-shə) is an American television sitcom that aired on UPN from January 23, 1996, to May 14, 2001. The series stars R&B singer Brandy as Moesha Denise Mitchell, an African-American teenager living with her upper middle class family in the Leimert Park neighborhood of Los Angeles. It was originally ordered as a pilot for CBS' 1995–1996 television season but was declined by the network. It was then later picked up by UPN, which aired it as a mid-season replacement. It went on to become the biggest success for the nascent network and one of the greatest hits over the course of the network's entire run. The series was a joint production for UPN by Regan Jon Productions, Saradipity Productions, and Jump at the Sun Productions in association with Big Ticket Television.

== Overview ==
The series focused on the life of a black upper-middle-class family through the eyes of a typical girl named Moesha. Her father Frank, a widower and Saturn car salesman (and later owner of his own dealership, Brothers Saturn), has married Dee, the vice principal at Moesha's high school, much to Moesha's disapproval. The series was created by Ralph Farquhar, along with the writing team of Sara V. Finney and Vida Spears. The settings for the show include the Mitchell household, teen hangout The Den, and in some cases, Crenshaw High School, the school attended by Moesha, Kim, Niecy, and Hakeem. The sitcom was set in the Leimert Park neighborhood of Los Angeles.

=== Issues addressed ===
The show dealt with real social issues affecting teenagers, such as premarital sex, the death of a parent, teen pregnancy, drug use, race relations, sexuality, dementia, and day-to-day issues teenagers faced at home and school such as gender prejudice and inequality. In one of the most controversial episodes, "Secrets and Lies" (aired February 7, 2000), the Mitchell family learned from Aunt Hattie that Frank is the biological father of Dorian, whom the Mitchells and Dorian himself believed to be Frank's nephew. The shocking news of Frank's infidelity during his first marriage turned the family upside-down and resulted in Dorian's rebellion and Moesha moving out of the family home and into a dorm room.

Moesha was also the first Black-cast sitcom to have an episode devoted to teenagers and non-heterosexuality. The episode, "Labels" (aired October 1, 1996), concerned Hakeem's cousin Omar showing up at the Mitchell's home and the family fears he could be another Hakeem. Instead, he seems to be nice and responsible. Moesha, still grieving about her break-up with Q, goes out on a date with Omar. After attending a movie, they meet Omar's friend, Tracy, leading Moesha to believe that Omar may be gay. Moesha later tells Kim and Niecy her suspicions, and it doesn't take long until everyone in school knows the latest gossip. When Hakeem hears the news, Moesha realizes that she may have jeopardized their friendship.

== Episodes ==
Season	Episodes	Originally released	
Season	Episodes	First released	Last released
1	14	January 23, 1996	May 21, 1996
2	24	August 27, 1996	May 20, 1997
3	23	August 26, 1997	May 19, 1998
4	22	October 6, 1998	May 25, 1999
5	22	August 23, 1999	May 22, 2000
6	22	September 4, 2000	May 14, 2001

== Cast and characters ==
=== Overview ===
Actor	Character	seasons					
Actor	Character	1	2	3	4	5	6
Brandy Norwood	Moesha Denise "Mo" Mitchell	Main	Main	Main	Main	Main	Main
William Allen Young	Franklin "Frank" Mitchell	Main	Main	Main	Main	Main	Main
Countess Vaughn	Kimberly Ann "Kim" Parker	Main	Main	Main	Main	Archive footage	Archive footage
Marcus T. Paulk	Myles Mitchell	Main	Main	Main	Main	Main	Main
Lamont Bentley	Hakeem Campbell	Main	Main	Main	Main	Main	Main
Yvette Wilson	Andalusia Louise "Andell" Wilkerson	Main	Main	Main	Main	Main	
Sheryl Lee Ralph	Deidre "Dee" Mitchell (née Moss)	Main	Main	Main	Main	Main	Recurring
Shar Jackson	Denise "Niecy" Jackson	Recurring	Main	Main	Main	Main	Main
Fredro Starr	Quinton "Q" Brooks		Main	Main	Guest	Recurring	Recurring
Ray J	Dorian Long					Main	Main

=== Main ===
Season 1 cast of Moesha

- Brandy Norwood as Moesha Denise "Mo" Mitchell – Like many teenagers, Moesha is trying to find her place in life. Moesha narrates the series about life lessons that she learns at the end of the episode. At every turn, Moesha, along with her friends and family, experiences new challenges and hilarious situations associated with the pressures and demands of growing up in an often confusing world. Moesha is headstrong, independent, and at times stubborn, but stands up for what she believes is right. She can sometimes be rebellious toward her father and stepmother. Through the first five seasons, Moesha would open the show speaking her thoughts into her diary. In Season 5, it's revealed that Moesha has a second brother, Dorian. She moves out after hearing this. Moesha is 15–16 years old in season 1, and is 20-21 by season 6.
- William Allen Young as Franklin "Frank" Mitchell – A Saturn car dealer and father to Moesha and Myles. Originally thought to be Dorian's uncle, he is later revealed to be the young man's father. Frank is also a member of Kappa Alpha Psi fraternity. He is a graduate of Southern University and A&M College. Frank and Dee are strict disciplinarians to their children. He married Dee after his first wife, Moesha and Myles's mother, died.
- Sheryl Lee Ralph as Deidre "Dee" Mitchell (Seasons 1–5; recurring in Season 6) A high school principal attempting to balance her career with two additional roles as wife to Frank and stepmother to Moesha and Myles. Dee is also a strict disclipinarian to the kids. She is originally from Jamaica and would speak in a thick Jamaican accent when talking about her childhood or when angered. It is implied that Dee is a member of Delta Sigma Theta sorority due to a quote in the episode "Niece" in which Moesha says that she wouldn't be persuaded by Dee with Delta picnics. Ralph left her role as a main cast member following season 5. She did not appreciate the storyline in which the family discovered that Frank was Dorian's real father.
- Countess Vaughn as Kimberly Ann "Kim" Parker (Seasons 1–4) – Moesha's boy-crazy best friend who has a crush on Hakeem during the first two seasons, but later dates Michael. She leaves the show after the fourth season to star in her own spin-off series The Parkers with Mo'Nique, who played her mother, Nikki Parker. She and Nikki graduate from Crenshaw High School in 1999 and go on to study at Santa Monica College. Kim originally planned to go to the Fashion Institute of Leimert, but ended up going to SMC after the former shut down suddenly toward the end of her senior year of high school.
- Marcus T. Paulk as Myles Mitchell — Moesha's pesky younger brother. Early in the series, he is known mostly for playing practical jokes on his sister and her friends. Throughout the series, he progresses from 3rd grade to 8th grade.
- Lamont Bentley as Hakeem Campbell — A frequent visitor to the Mitchell household, he is Moesha's lifelong friend and neighbor, and later her boyfriend. In the spin-off The Parkers, it was revealed that he and Moesha were no longer in a relationship. He dated Kim's best friend Stevie Van Lowe (played by Jenna von Oÿ).
- Yvette Wilson as Andalusia Louise "Andell" Wilkerson (Seasons 1–5) — Moesha's adult friend and owner of the neighborhood hangout The Den. During season 5 she sells her establishment to a local funeral director. Andell is featured on the spin-off show The Parkers, where she owns a self-named restaurant and bar.
- Shar Jackson as Denise "Niecy" Jackson (Seasons 2–6; recurring in Season 1) — Moesha's best friend and later her roommate. She has four brothers and four sisters whom she has to care for during high school, so she does not find time to work during high school like her friends Hakeem and Moesha. Niecy also made a guest appearance in a season 1 episode of Girlfriends.
- Fredro Starr as Quinton "Q" Brooks (Seasons 2 & 3; recurring Seasons 4–6) — Moesha's longest-running love interest. He is from New York City and had an on-and-off relationship with Moesha until departing in the middle season 3 to manage a hip-hop group. Frank dislikes him, because he feels is a bad influence on Moesha. In season 6, Q proposes to Moesha and she accepts, but the engagement is called off when Q wants to sell Moesha's engagement ring to help support his hip-hop group on Thanksgiving.
- Ray J as Dorian Long (Seasons 5 & 6) — Moesha and Myles' long lost half-brother, previously said to be their cousin. Dorian is originally from Oakland, California, but runs away from his mother's home to live with the Mitchells. He was known to be a troublemaker back in Oakland so the Mitchells did not treat him lightly. Dorian is also an aspiring rapper going by the nickname, "D-Money". He graduates from high school during season 6.

=== Recurring ===
- Bernie Mac as Bernard Jefferson "Bernie" Mitchell (Seasons 1–4) Moesha's uncle and Frank's brother; Andell's boyfriend
- Ricky Harris as Javon Aramis "J.W." Willis (Seasons 1–3), a mechanic working for Frank; Andell's boyfriend
- Merlin Santana as Ohaji (Season 1; guest appearance in Season 4), Moesha's first boyfriend
- Kara Brock as Sara (Season 1), a friend of Moesha, Kim and Niecy
- Antwon Tanner as Michael (Seasons 2 & 3; guest appearance in Season 1), Kim's boyfriend and Q's teammate on the basketball team
- Kellie Shanygne Williams as Charrisse (Seasons 2 & 4), Dee's niece who helps Moesha to see a different side of her stepmom
- Dwight Woody as Coach Vines, Crenshaw High's basketball coach (Seasons 2 & 3)
- Dru Mouser as Haley Dillard (Season 3), Moesha's first friend at Bridgewood
- Usher Raymond as Jeremy Davis (Season 3; guest appearance in Season 4), a love interest of Moesha who goes to Bridgewood
- Dante Basco as Marco (Season 3), a friend of Moesha's at Bridgewood
- Monica McSwain as Mary Ellen Hobbs (Seasons 3 & 4) a stuck-up girl at Bridgewood who clashes with Moesha
- Jon Huertas as Antonio Avalan (Season 4), a friend of Hakeem and high school student at Crenshaw High School
- Brandon Quintin Adams as Aaron (Season 4), Moesha's college-aged boyfriend
- Mo'Nique as Nicole "Nikki" Parker (Season 4; guest appearance in Season 6), Kim's mother who goes back to high school in order to graduate with her daughter and her friends
- Jo Marie Payton as Bernetta Campbell (Seasons 4 & 5), Hakeem's mother, who works at the Magic Johnson theater
- Alexis Fields as Alicia (Seasons 5 & 6; guest appearance in Season 4), Moesha's rival at California University. She later shares a suite with Moesha, Niecy, and Brenda during their sophomore year
- Marissa Jaret Winokur as Theresa (Season 5), Moesha's roommate during her freshman year of college
- Master P as Patience (Season 5), a thug that Dorian associates with and later gets him into trouble
- Lahmard Tate as Jerome (Seasons 5 & 6), a friend of Hakeem's who attends college with him; Niecy's on-and-off boyfriend
- Iona Morris as Sandra "Sandy" Mitchell-Long (Seasons 5 & 6) Moesha's aunt and Dorian's adoptive mother from Oakland, California
- Ginuwine as Khalib (Season 6), a group member of Q's and later a love interest of Moesha
- Jazsmin Lewis as Lanae Foster (Season 6), an older woman that Dorian has a short-lived love affair with
- Olivia Brown as Barbara Lee (Season 6), Dorian's birth mother and sister-in-law of Maya Wilkes from Girlfriends
- Bree Turner as Brenda (Season 6), one of Moesha's and Niecy's roommates in sophomore year
- Kym Whitley as Gertrude "Gertie" Lowe (Season 6), a woman who dated Frank, and later Nikki's best friend in The Parkers

== Production ==
=== Opening credits ===
There have been different versions of the opening credits theme song, which was performed by Brandy. One version was used for season 1, a second version was used for seasons 2 and 3, and a third version was used for the final three seasons. Although the same recording of the theme song was used for the last three seasons, two different openings were used for each of the first three seasons.

The opening sequence for season 1 shows Moesha dancing in front of a fountain, walking with friends, dancing in a moving car, and winning at a game of chess while waving at a guy as he walks away.

The opening sequence for seasons 2 and 3 features the same scenario with some changes. Moesha was still dancing in front of the fountain but with a bass guitar player behind her. Instead of just depicting Moesha with her friends, this intro sees her playing basketball and baseball with her friends and family, driving with her friends, strutting down a block with Kim and Niecy, teaching Kim how to rollerblade (later replaced with footage of Moesha & Q chasing Myles), and once again being served a meal at the diner by Andell while seated with her family. When Moesha is again distracted by a cute guy walking by, Frank tries to cover Moesha's eyes.

Season 4 showed the cast around the neighborhood and Moesha, Kim, and Niecy dancing at the fountain while wearing red outfits.

Season 5 showed the cast dancing in a panoramic view as Norwood lip-syncs to the theme song on a background of clouds and a rising sun. The introduction for season 6 is similar to that of season 5, but features a twist. Since Yvette Wilson left Moesha to join the cast of The Parkers and Sheryl Lee Ralph's character Dee became a recurring character, the season 6 opening features footage of Norwood lip-syncing over the portion of the theme song where Yvette Wilson and Sheryl Lee Ralph appeared in the previous season's opening.

=== Spin-off and Brock Akil universe ===
Given her popularity for four seasons on Moesha, Countess Vaughn left the show in 1999 for her spin-off, The Parkers, which premiered on August 30, 1999, on UPN. It centered on Kim attending community college with her mother, played by comedian Mo'Nique. Leaving Moesha, Yvette Wilson joined the cast of The Parkers as Andell Wilkerson, Nikki's childhood friend.

Several Moesha cast members (including Brandy Norwood, William Allen Young, Shar Jackson, Sheryl Lee Ralph, and Marcus T. Paulk) made crossover appearances on The Parkers. Lamont Bentley, being the most frequent, appears in three episodes.

Though not a direct spin-off of Moesha, the show Girlfriends was created by Moesha writer Mara Brock Akil and exists in the same universe as Moesha. The character Maya Wilkes (Golden Brooks) from Girlfriends lives in Leimert Park like the characters of Moesha, and appeared in an episode babysitting for her sister-in-law Barbara Lee, who happened to be Dorian's birth mother. Niecy appeared in a season 1 episode of Girlfriends.

The CW series The Game was spun off from Girlfriends with the loose thread of main character Melanie Barnett (Tia Mowry) being a cousin of Girlfriends main character Joan Clayton (Tracee Ellis Ross). The Melanie and Derwin characters re-appeared in the Girlfriends Season 7 finale episode at Joan's engagement party. On Moesha, Brandy played herself as a celebrity doppelganger to Moesha, and ironically Brandy joined the cast of The Game in its fifth season as Chardonnay Pitts, further complicating the notion of the show existing in the same universe.

=== Cancellation ===
By the sixth season, ratings for Moesha had dropped and UPN opted not to renew or air the series for a seventh season. The series ended on an unresolved cliffhanger with Myles being kidnapped by a rival of Dorian, Moesha considering moving in with Hakeem or her best friend Niecy, and a positive pregnancy test being found in the trash at Moesha's dorm room, without positive identification as to whose it was. Entertainment Weekly reported a rumor that certain plots were to be resolved on The Parkers, but those storylines were ultimately never resolved.

=== Possible revival ===
On November 3, 2017, the cast reunited on The Real and have expressed interest in reviving the show. "Absolutely, we need a reboot to this show, because we ended on a cliffhanger." Norwood pointed out. In August 2020, Norwood revealed she was in talks for a reboot, citing the show's success on Netflix.

== Syndication ==
The show aired in syndication on UPN, Fox, and The WB affiliates. The series aired on WGN America (now NewsNation) from 2005 to 2008, The N from 2005 to 2009, Up TV, BET Her, and BET until mid 2016, Fuse until 2019, Bounce TV until 2021, and currently airs on Dabl since 2023. On Up TV, it was edited for content to make it more "family-friendly" and was often edited heavily for broadcast on BET and BET Her due to airtime constraints.

In the UK, Moesha aired on Channel 4 from 1996 until 1998, with only the first three seasons being broadcast. It also aired on Nickelodeon from 1996 to 2000, who only showed episodes from the first four seasons which were edited so they would be more suitable for broadcast on children's television. Paramount Channel aired the series from 2000 to 2003, as did Trouble from 2003 to 2006. From 1 November 2019, the program started airing on Trace Vault following its rebrand from The Vault.

Since 2008, the show has aired in international syndication in Spain, Portugal, Israel, the Middle East, Russia, France, Germany, Austria, the Netherlands, Belgium, Ireland, South Africa, Latin America, Brazil, and Australia. In Spain, it ran on Disney Channel from 2005 to 2011 in an edited format deemed suitable for children's television. In Italy the series currently airs on Canale 8.

In 2020, the series was available on streaming on Tubi in the United States, while spin-off series The Parkers was available to stream on Netflix. The series is also available to stream on Paramount+, BET+, and Hulu.

== Home media ==
On September 27, 2011, CBS Home Entertainment released Moesha: The First Season on DVD in Region 1 via Amazon.com's CreateSpace program. This is a Manufacture-on-Demand (MOD) release, available exclusively through Amazon.com.

DVD Name	Ep #	Release dates		
DVD Name	Ep #	Region 1	Region 2	Region 4
The Complete 1st Season	14	September 27, 2011	N/A	N/A

== Ratings ==
The following table summarizes the U.S. television ratings for the series:

Season	Season premiere	Season finale	TV season	Ranking	Viewers (in millions)
1	January 23, 1996	May 21, 1996	1995–1996	#141	3.5
2	August 27, 1996	May 20, 1997	1996–1997	#134	3.5
3	August 26, 1997	May 19, 1998	1997–1998	#141	4.0
4	October 6, 1998	May 25, 1999	1998–1999	#137	3.3
5	August 23, 1999	May 22, 2000	1999–2000	#130	2.4
6	September 4, 2000	May 14, 2001	2000–2001	#130	3.3

== Awards ==
Year	Award	Category	Recipient	Ref.
1997	NAACP Image Awards	Outstanding Youth Actor/Actress	Brandy Norwood	
1998	NAACP Image Awards	Outstanding Supporting Actress in a Comedy Series	Countess Vaughn	
1999	SHINE Awards	Comedy Episode	For episode "Birth Control"	
2000	SHINE Awards	Comedy Episode	For episode "Let's Talk About Sex"	
