= List of Family Matters episodes =

Family Matters is an American television sitcom that originally aired on ABC for eight seasons from September 22, 1989, to May 9, 1997, then moved to CBS for its ninth and final season from September 19, 1997, to July 17, 1998. A total of 215 episodes were produced.

== Series overview ==
Season	Episodes	Originally released			Rank	Rating	Viewers (millions)
Season	Episodes	First released	Last released	Network	Rank	Rating	Viewers (millions)
1	22	September 22, 1989	April 27, 1990	ABC	39	13.7	22.2
2	25	September 21, 1990	May 3, 1991	ABC	15	15.8	26.4
3	25	September 20, 1991	May 8, 1992	ABC	27	13.5	21.6
4	24	September 18, 1992	May 14, 1993	ABC	32	12.6	20.8
5	24	September 24, 1993	May 20, 1994	ABC	30	12.6	20.7
6	25	September 23, 1994	May 19, 1995	ABC	34	11.6	18.4
7	24	September 22, 1995	May 17, 1996	ABC	42	10.5	17.0
8	24	September 20, 1996	May 9, 1997	ABC	50	8.8	14.02
9	22	September 19, 1997	July 17, 1998	CBS	99	5.9	8.17

== Episodes ==
=== Season 1 (1989–90) ===
No. overall	No. in season	Title	Directed by	Written by	Original release date	Prod. code	U.S. viewers (millions)
1	1	"The Mama Who Came to Dinner"	Joel Zwick	William Bickley & Michael Warren	September 22, 1989	445230	21.9
2	2	"Two Income Family"	James O'Keefe	Robert Blair	September 29, 1989	446002	21.1
3	3	"Short Story"	Joel Zwick	William Bickley & Michael Warren	October 6, 1989	446001	22.6
4	4	"Rachel's First Date"	John Bowab	Sally Lapiduss & Pamela Eells	October 13, 1989	446004	20.8
5	5	"Straight A's"	John Bowab	Geoff Gordon & Gordon Lewis	October 20, 1989	446007	22.4
6	6	"Basketball Blues"	James O'Keefe	Barry Gold	November 3, 1989	446003	23.1
7	7	"Body Damage"	James O'Keefe	Ken Kuta	November 10, 1989	446005	21.9
8	8	"Mr. Badwrench"	John Bowab	Alan Eisenstock & Larry Mintz	November 17, 1989	446006	20.6
9	9	"Stake-Out"	James O'Keefe	Sally Lapiduss & Pamela Eells	November 24, 1989	446010	19.9
10	10	"False Arrest"	Peter Baldwin	Barry Gold	December 1, 1989	446008	22.2
11	11	"The Quilt"	Peter Baldwin	David Scott Richardson	December 8, 1989	446009	24.0
12	12	"Laura's First Date"	Richard Correll	William Bickley & Michael Warren	December 15, 1989	446012	17.3
13	13	"Man's Best Friend"	Richard Correll	Robert Blair	January 5, 1990	446013	24.5
14	14	"Baker's Dozen"	James O'Keefe	Ken Kuta	January 12, 1990	446014	24.9
15	15	"The Big Reunion"	Richard Correll	Alan Eisenstock & Larry Mintz	January 19, 1990	446011	26.0
16	16	"The Party"	Richard Correll	Ken Kuta	February 2, 1990	446016	24.6
17	17	"The Big Fix"	Richard Correll	Sally Lapiduss & Pamela Eells	February 9, 1990	446017	22.8
18	18	"Sitting Pretty"	Richard Correll	Ken Kuta	February 23, 1990	446018	23.4
19	19	"In a Jam"	Richard Correll	Alan Eisenstock & Larry Mintz	March 16, 1990	446019	21.7
20	20	"The Candidate"	James O'Keefe	Barry Gold	March 23, 1990	446015	23.4
21	21	"Bowl Me Over"	Richard Correll	Robert Blair	April 20, 1990	446021	20.3
22	22	"Rock Video"	Richard Correll	Geoff Gordon & Gordon Lewis	April 27, 1990	446020	19.9

=== Season 2 (1990–91) ===
No. overall	No. in season	Title	Directed by	Written by	Original release date	Prod. code	U.S. viewers (millions)
23	1	"Rachel's Place"	Richard Correll	David W. Duclon & Gary Menteer	September 21, 1990	446451	24.3
24	2	"Torn Between Two Lovers"	Gary Menteer	Janet Lynne Jackson	September 21, 1990	446454	24.3
25	3	"Marriage 101"	Richard Correll	Sally Lapiduss & Pamela Eells	September 28, 1990	446452	23.5
26	4	"Flashpants"	Gerren Keith	Stephen Langford	October 5, 1990	446455	23.2
27	5	"The Crash Course"	Gary Menteer	Manny Basanese	October 12, 1990	446456	23.7
28	6	"Boxcar Blues"	Mark Linn-Baker	Fred Fox, Jr.	October 19, 1990	446453	23.5
29	7	"Dog Day Halloween"	Gerren Keith	David W. Duclon & Fred Fox, Jr.	October 26, 1990	446460	25.5
30	8	"Cousin Urkel"	Gary Menteer	Sally Lapiduss & Pamela Eells	November 2, 1990	446457	24.8
31	9	"Dedicated to the One I Love"	Gary Menteer	Sara V. Finney & Vida Spears	November 9, 1990	446458	25.9
32	10	"The Science Project"	Gary Menteer	Sally Lapiduss & Pamela Eells	November 16, 1990	446461	26.0
33	11	"Requiem for an Urkel"	Joel Zwick	David W. Duclon	November 23, 1990	446462	25.4
34	12	"Fast Eddie Winslow"	Gerren Keith	Fred Fox, Jr.	November 30, 1990	446459	25.8
35	13	"Have Yourself a Merry Winslow Christmas"	Richard Correll	David W. Duclon	December 21, 1990	446465	23.7
36	14	"Ice Station Winslow"	Richard Correll	Gary Menteer	January 4, 1991	446464	28.6
37	15	"Son"	Gary Menteer	José Rivera	January 11, 1991	446463	30.4
38	16	"Do the Right Thing"	Gary Menteer	Sally Lapiduss & Pamela Eells	January 18, 1991	446466	25.9
39	17	"High Hopes"	Gary Menteer	Fred Fox, Jr. & Denise Snee	February 1, 1991	446467	28.3
40	18	"Life of the Party"	Gary Menteer	Janet Lynne Jackson	February 8, 1991	446468	30.9
41	19	"Busted"	Richard Correll	David W. Duclon & Fred Fox, Jr.	February 15, 1991	446470	29.8
42	20	"Fight the Good Fight"	Gary Menteer	Sara V. Finney & Vida Spears	March 1, 1991	446469	30.6
43	21	"Taking Credit"	Richard Correll	David W. Duclon	March 15, 1991	446472	29.2
44	22	"Finding the Words"	Richard Correll	Fred Fox, Jr.	March 22, 1991	446471	28.8
45	23	"Skip to My Lieu"	Richard Correll	Charlene Seeger	April 1, 1991	446474	26.6
46	24	"The Good, the Bad, and the Urkel"	Richard Correll	Sally Lapiduss & Pamela Eells	April 26, 1991	446475	26.5
47	25	"I Should Have Done Something"	Richard Correll	David W. Duclon	May 3, 1991	446473	22.9

=== Season 3 (1991–92) ===
No. overall	No. in season	Title	Directed by	Written by	Original release date	Prod. code	U.S. viewers (millions)
48	1	"Boom!"	Richard Correll	David W. Duclon	September 20, 1991	446902	22.7
49	2	"Brain over Brawn"	Richard Correll	Fred Fox, Jr.	September 27, 1991	446903	19.4
50	3	"The Show Must Go On"	John Tracy	Gary M. Goodrich	October 4, 1991	446905	21.0
51	4	"Words Hurt"	John Tracy	David W. Duclon & Fred Fox, Jr.	October 11, 1991	446904	21.0
52	5	"Daddy's Little Girl"	Richard Correll	Sara V. Finney & Vida Spears	October 18, 1991	446901	21.0
53	6	"Citizens' Court"	John Tracy	Regina Stewart	October 25, 1991	446906	22.6
54	7	"Robo-Nerd"	Richard Correll	Gary Menteer	November 1, 1991	446910	23.1
55	8	"Making the Team"	Richard Correll	David W. Duclon & Gary Menteer	November 8, 1991	446909	25.4
56	9	"Born to Be Mild"	John Tracy	Jim Geoghan	November 15, 1991	446911	24.4
57	10	"The Love God"	John Tracy	Stephen Langford	November 22, 1991	446912	23.9
58	11	"Old and Alone"	Richard Correll	Stephen Langford	November 29, 1991	446908	19.0
59	12	"A Pair of Ladies"	John Tracy	Fred Fox, Jr.	December 6, 1991	446913	22.1
60	13	"Choir Trouble"	James O'Keefe	Mary M. Schwarze	December 20, 1991	446907	20.7
61	14	"A Test of Friendship"	Richard Correll	Regina Stewart	January 10, 1992	446915	23.9
62	15	"Jailhouse Blues"	Gary Menteer	Sara V. Finney & Vida Spears	January 24, 1992	446914	23.1
63	16	"Brown Bombshell"	John Tracy	Sara V. Finney & Vida Spears	January 31, 1992	446918	23.0
64	17	"Food, Lies and Videotape"	John Tracy	Stephen Langford	February 7, 1992	446919	22.9
65	18	"My Broken-Hearted Valentine"	Richard Correll	Gary Menteer	February 14, 1992	446916	21.2
66	19	"Woman of the People"	Richard Correll	David W. Duclon & Gary Menteer	February 21, 1992	446920	20.2
67	20	"Love and Kisses"	John Tracy	Jim Geoghan	February 28, 1992	446917	21.8
68	21	"Stop! In the Name of Love"	John Tracy	David W. Duclon & Gary Menteer	March 13, 1992	446922	19.7
69	22	"The Urkel Who Came to Dinner"	John Tracy	Regina Stewart	April 3, 1992	446921	23.0
70	23	"Robo-Nerd II"	Richard Correll	Gary Menteer	April 24, 1992	446923	19.8
71	24	"Dudes"	Richard Correll	Fred Fox, Jr. & Jim Geoghan	May 1, 1992	446924	17.3
72	25	"Farewell, My Laura"	Richard Correll	David W. Duclon & Gary Menteer	May 8, 1992	446925	17.6

=== Season 4 (1992–93) ===
No. overall	No. in season	Title	Directed by	Written by	Original release date	Prod. code	U.S. viewers (millions)
73	1	"Surely You Joust"	John Tracy	Fred Fox, Jr. & Jim Geoghan	September 18, 1992	447801	19.7
74	2	"Dance to the Music"	John Tracy	Joseph Cvar & Gary Menteer	October 2, 1992	447804	17.9
75	3	"Driving Carl Crazy"	John Tracy	Stephen Langford	October 9, 1992	447803	20.4
76	4	"Rumor Has It..."	Gary Menteer	Gary M. Goodrich	October 16, 1992	447805	20.2
77	5	"Number One With a Bullet"	Gary Menteer	Fred Fox, Jr.	October 23, 1992	447806	17.7
78	6	"Whose Kid Is It Anyway?"	John Tracy	Sara V. Finney & Vida Spears	October 30, 1992	447807	19.2
79	7	"An Officer and a Waldo"	John Tracy	David W. Duclon	November 6, 1992	447808	20.4
80	8	"Just One Date"	Gary Menteer	Fred Fox, Jr.	November 13, 1992	447812	21.0
81	9	"The Oddest Couple"	John Tracy	Jim Geoghan	November 20, 1992	447810	22.3
82	10	"It's Beginning to Look a Lot Like Urkel"	John Tracy	David W. Duclon & Gary Menteer	December 11, 1992	447815	22.2
83	11	"Muskrat Love"	John Tracy	Regina Stewart	January 8, 1993	447813	22.3
84	12	"Hot Wheels"	John Tracy	Regina Stewart	January 15, 1993	447802	23.3
85	13	"The Way the Ball Bounces"	Jeffrey Ganz	Stephen Langford	January 22, 1993	447817	23.2
86	14	"A Thought in the Dark"	Gary Menteer	Bob Illes & James R. Stein	January 29, 1993	447814	N/A
87	15	"Tender Kisses"	John Tracy	Fred Fox, Jr. & Jim Geoghan	February 5, 1993	447818	23.7
88	16	"Heart Strings"	John Tracy	David W. Duclon & Gary Menteer	February 12, 1993	447819	21.4
89	17	"It's a Mad, Mad, Mad House"	John Tracy	Regina Stewart	February 19, 1993	447811	23.9
90	18	"Higher Anxiety"	Richard Correll	Jim Geoghan	February 26, 1993	447816	23.1
91	19	"Mama's Wedding"	Gary Menteer	Sara V. Finney & Vida Spears	March 5, 1993	447820	22.8
92	20	"Pulling Teeth"	Gary Menteer	David W. Duclon & Gary Menteer	March 19, 1993	447822	22.8
93	21	"Walk on the Wild Side"	John Tracy	Sara V. Finney & Vida Spears	March 26, 1993	447809	21.8
94	22	"Hot Stuff"	Gary Menteer	Stephen Langford	April 30, 1993	447821	18.5
95	23	"Stormy Weather"	John Tracy	Fred Fox, Jr.	May 7, 1993	447823	16.1
96	24	"Buds 'n' Buns"	John Tracy	Jim Geoghan	May 14, 1993	447824	14.7

=== Season 5 (1993–94) ===
No. overall	No. in season	Title	Directed by	Written by	Original release date	Prod. code	U.S. viewers (millions)
97	1	"Hell Toupee"	John Tracy	Regina Stewart Larsen	September 24, 1993	455351	18.2
Myra visits Steve at school for lunch, and once again accuses Laura of trying to vie for his affections. The end result is a huge food fight, which gets them into trouble since they receive cafeteria duty for two weeks and Myra is punished by her parents for two weeks. Steve decides to continue dating Myra, but he will break up with her if Laura changes her mind. Meanwhile, Carl – feeling he has lost his romantic touch with Harriette – decides to invest in a toupee. He later feels better when he learns that Harriette has also been dealing with hair problems as well. Guest stars: Charlie Dell as Barry, Guy Torry as Student
98	2	"It Didn't Happen One Night"	Gary Menteer	Joseph Cvar & Gary Menteer	October 1, 1993	455352	18.1
Laura oversleeps on the morning of a huge cheerleader competition in Cincinnati, Ohio, and asks Steve to drive her there in his BMW Isetta. She quickly becomes frustrated with the car's slow speed, and in trying to get Steve to drive faster, causes it to break down. At the rundown hotel they stay at while the car is being repaired and a thunderstorm rages outside, Laura's disgusted and dismissive treatment of Steve finally pushes him to get angry at her and say he won't accept her treating him that badly anymore, which in turns leads Laura to apologize and the two of them to get back to being friends. Meanwhile, Carl gets annoyed as Fletcher and Estelle continually express love for each other in public, which is something he never does with Harriette. He also makes an inept attempt to fix the kitchen window after Steve broke it by jumping through it, against Harriette's admonition to call a professional. Guest star: Arnold Johnson as Fletcher Thomas
99	3	"Saved by the Urkel"	Gary Menteer	David W. Duclon	October 8, 1993	455354	19.8
Carl is trying to repair a lamp and ignores Steve's warning about bare wire touching the base of the lamp. Carl electrocutes himself, and only Steve knows CPR. Steve ends up saving Carl's life. The Winslows find themselves indebted to Steve and shower him with gratitude. The incident also inspires Eddie and Laura to learn CPR.
100	4	"A Matter of Principle"	Richard Correll	Jim Geoghan	October 15, 1993	455355	21.0
In the series' 100th episode, Harriette's employer, the Chicago Chronicle, is experiencing budget cuts, and Harriette's boss, Mr. Rollins, asks her to cut her workforce. Harriette doesn't want to fire anyone, and Carl gives her some advice on how to tell Mr. Rollins this. The end result has Harriette losing her job. Meanwhile, Myra transfers to Steve's school and asks Eddie and Laura for advice in winning Steve's heart. Guest stars: Michael Kaufman as Mr. Berger, William Joseph Barker as Boy in Classroom
101	5	"Money Out the Window"	Gary Menteer	Gary M. Goodrich	October 22, 1993	455353	17.8
Weasel and Waldo entice Eddie into their football betting venture. A thug named Bones (Bubba Smith) pays him a visit when he loses a bundle, threatening him with serious injury if the debt is not settled in a timely manner. Refusing to listen to Steve's advice, Eddie sells Carl's precious stamp to settle the debt: a decision he will regret and wish Bones beat him up before his father finds out (which Carl does via Steve and the owner of the Stamp Emporium). Meanwhile, Laura adds a night job to her hectic schedule to try to get more money for a car, resulting in her being tired throughout the day. Soon Harriette convinces her to focus on her day job and let them come up with the other half of the money. Guest star: Bubba Smith as Bones
102	6	"Best Friends"	Gary Menteer	Fred Fox, Jr.	October 29, 1993	455356	21.7
Harriette tries (a little too hard) to fit in with Laura's social group to bond with her daughter. Laura is embarrassed until KC and Maxine reminds her that their mothers aren't exactly close to them. Meanwhile, Waldo (who has been fired from a series of jobs) appears to be a failure at his new job as cashier at the Mighty Weenie until Eddie remembers that Waldo is a talented cook and rehires him as a chef. Guest stars: Venus DeMilo Thomas as K.C., Jon Lauren as Clown Customer
103	7	"Grandmama"	Richard Correll	Story by : Jaleel White; Teleplay by : Fred Fox, Jr. & Jim Geoghan	November 5, 1993	455357	22.7
When Eddie dumps Steve as his partner in a prestigious 2-on-2 basketball tournament in favor of a star player (Darius McCrary's real-life brother, Donovan McCrary as Kenny "The Spider" Jackson), the nerd turns to Grandmama (NBA star Larry Johnson's alter ego) for retribution. Meanwhile, Carl and Harriette quarrel over Laura's curfew. Laura sees this and decides to take responsibility for herself in the matter. Guest stars: Larry Johnson as Grandmama, Donovan McCrary as Kenny "The Spider" Jackson, Sam Scarber as Basketball Official, Marcus Nash as Marcus
104	8	"Dr. Urkel and Mr. Cool"	John Tracy	Jim Geoghan	November 12, 1993	455359	25.0
After Laura gets fed up with Steve's clumsiness and nerdy behavior after accidentally spilling drinks on her, she tells him that he needs to change. So Steve devises the ultimate scheme to win her heart...a potion called "cool genes" that will make him cool. Steve drinks the potion and becomes Stefan Urquelle, an ultra-suave, good-looking ladies man, and quickly wins Laura's heart and becomes popular with other girls as well. However, when his arrogant, narcissistic traits begin to show, it isn't long before Laura gets fed up and asks to have the irksome nerd back. When Stefan questions why, she admits as annoying as Steve is, he is more caring towards others, and Stefan complies by eating a tablet (serving as the antidote). Afterwards, Laura is happy to have Steve back and swears she never want to see the shallow Stefan again. Steve tells her that his cool alter-ego just needs to be renovated. Guest stars: Venus DeMilo Thomas as K.C., Charles Carpenter as Flirting Customer
105	9	"Car Wars"	Richard Correll	Sheila M. Anthony	November 19, 1993	455358	21.9
Laura wants to buy a car, but finds the high-pressure salesman (Stuart Pankin) more than she can handle alone, given his sexist attitude. At Steve's suggestion, she dons a mustache and hat and poses as a man to buy a car. Steve is close to spoiling Eddie's love life, especially when Eddie's previous and current girlfriends meet. Guest stars: Stuart Pankin as Honest Bob, Elise Neal as Heather, Jonas Chaka as Ralph, Valarie Miller as Helen
106	10	"All the Wrong Moves"	Richard Correll	Fred Fox, Jr.	November 26, 1993	455361	18.3
Laura, Steve and Waldo each have dates at the drive-in movie theater. Laura's boyfriend wants to have sex, but doesn't seem to understand the meaning of the word "no". Myra wants to have sex with Steve, but when he too refuses, she decides perhaps it is a good idea to wait. Waldo, of course, is Waldo, what with his bringing lawn chairs to enjoy the show, much to an embarrassed Maxine's chagrin. Meanwhile, Harriette starts charging Carl for services after they fight over a credit card reward. Soon Carl realizes his behavior is wrong, apologizes to Harriette and buys her a new refrigerator. Guest stars: Kevin Mambo as Derek, Ryal Haakenson as Wrestling Match's Audience
107	11	"Christmas is Where the Heart Is"	Richard Correll	Stephen Langford	December 10, 1993	455363	21.2
Steve and Carl become stranded on a subway car after a power outage on Christmas Eve. Carl and all of the car's passengers are ill-tempered, wanting to get home to celebrate the holidays with their families, leaving it up to Steve to remind them that Christmas can be celebrated anywhere with anyone. Guest stars: Rick Hurst as Santa, Peter Iacangelo as Man with Tree, Evonne Kezios as Pregnant Woman, Meg Wyllie as Elderly Woman, Frank Kopyc as Sleeping Tenor, Michael Caldwell as Waiter
108	12	"Scenes From a Mall"	Gary Menteer	David W. Duclon & Gary Menteer	December 17, 1993	455360	20.2
Myra demands commitment from Steve or else. When he refuses and asks her to leave him alone by giving him space to decide, Myra leaves in a crying fit believing Steve wants her to go away. He must now turn to Laura for help in calming Myra down. Steve explains to Myra that while he had no intentions in breaking up with her, he also makes it clear that if they continue dating, she can't force him to commit to her right away and asks that she respects his decision when he asks her to give him space. Waldo constantly worries that other boys have their eyes on Maxine, causing him to go into a jealous fit. Meanwhile, Eddie learns that the store model he has a crush, Garcelle (Garcelle Beauvais), only dates guys her own age, like above 21 years old. Also at the mall, Laura and Maxine try to raise money for the cheerleaders by selling raffle tickets. However, Waldo, worrying that other boys might have their eyes on Maxine, accidentally drives away potential customers. Elsewhere, while Harriette is at a job interview, Carl gets burdened with having to watch Richie & his friend, Lil' G (Gary LeRoi Gray), as he just wants to relax. So, he feigns back pain to avoid having to take care of them. James Avery makes a surprise visit in the end credits. Guest stars: Garcelle Beauvais as Garcelle, Gary LeRoi Gray as Lil' G, Gene Arrington as Guy at Mall #1, J. August Richards as Guy at Mall #2, Ellen Albertini Dow as Elderly Lady, James Avery as Himself, Gabrielle Union as Mall Girl
109	13	"Rock Enroll"	John Tracy	Sara V. Finney & Vida Spears	January 7, 1994	455362	25.6
Eddie considers postponing college in favor of a singing/songwriting career, particularly when Shanice performs the song he wrote. Shanice soon inspires him to go to college and get his degree when she reveals her plans to finish school. Meanwhile, Steve becomes depressed when no one seems to remember his birthday, unaware that Laura and Estelle are planning a surprise birthday party for him. Guest stars: Shanice as Herself, Gwendolyn J. Shepherd as Miss Bodison, Raymond D. Turner as Chauffeur
110	14	"Like a Virgin"	Richard Correll	David W. Duclon	January 14, 1994	455364	24.4
Wisecracker Jerry (Mark Adair-Rios) blabs about his latest conquest until Steve lets slip that Eddie has never had sex with anyone, leading to plenty of locker room teasing. He's embarrassed, until Laura reminds him that Jerry isn't popular with the girls and is the butt of their jokes. Eddie and his friends soon realize that still having your virginity as a teenager is just fine. Meanwhile, Steve seeks advice from Estelle when he needs her help in avoiding Myra, who wants Steve to commit to her. Guest star: Mark Adair-Rios as Jerry
111	15	"Good Cop, Bad Cop"	Richard Correll	Sara V. Finney & Vida Spears	January 21, 1994	455366	23.2
Carl has warned Eddie about his late-night carousing before. So when Eddie is pulled over for a traffic violation, he says he was the victim of racial profiling by a pair of overzealous police. Carl is skeptical of his son's story of how he was "a black guy in a white neighborhood", but promises to sort things out. What he finds out is the ugly truth (all as Eddie had explained) when the senior of the two officers reveals himself to be a severe bigot. An angry Carl threatens to report the senior officer for his racial profiling, while also urging his rookie partner to re-examine his own attitude. Meanwhile, Steve gets more than he bargained for when he takes a worried Richie to the dentist. Fortunately, Richie's check-up goes well, and he gets some cinnamon flavored dental floss. Steve wants some, and decides to get a check-up for himself. However, he finds he has a cavity, so the dentist Dr. Smiley gives him laughing gas. This makes Steve laugh so much that it prevented Dr. Smiley from doing his job. R&B group Shai have a cameo during a dream sequence in which Laura imagines the group singing to her in her living room. Guest cast: Robert Hooks as Dr. Smiley, Barry Cullison as Officer Evans, Joe Chrest as Officer Carmichael, Annie Gagen as Waitress, Shai as Themselves
112	16	"Presumed Urkel"	John Tracy	Felicia D. Henderson	February 4, 1994	455365	21.7
Accident-prone Steve is accused of blowing up the school's chemistry lab following an accident. With his academic future on the line, Laura defends Steve against his rival, Dexter Thornhill (Robert DeCrevel), who seems a little too eager to have him expelled. Catching on to his motivation early, Laura proves Steve's innocence by revealing who was really at fault with a blacklight. Exposed, Thornhill reveals he framed Steve for the crime, because he wanted to win last year's science fair and has hated him for always doing better than him academically. Steve's reputation is restored and Thornhill faces expulsion for his crimes. Guest stars: Robert DeCrevel as Dexter Thornhill, Clyde Kusatsu as Principal Edgar Shimata, Patrick Cronin as Mr. Sweeney, Tom Poston as Mr. Looney, Chris Villa as High School Student #3
113	17	"Father of the Bride"	John Tracy	Stephen Langford	February 11, 1994	455369	25.6
To get him out of his hair for the evening, Carl sends Steve on a bowling date with Laura, then watches a movie. Estelle warns him that they may fall in love, but he ignores her and dozes off. Carl quickly has a nightmare about how Steve and Laura fell in love, got married and gave birth to a brood of Urkel-kids in the year 2009. Guest stars: Mitchah Williams as Steven Aloysius Urkel, Marcus Miller Jr. as Steven Bertram Urkel, Ryan Doss as Steven Cornelius Urkel, Rachel Lundquist as Stephanie Sue Urkel
114	18	"Psycho Twins"	Richard Correll	Fred Fox, Jr. & Jim Geoghan	February 18, 1994	455368	18.4
Steve invents some "snooze juice", which is intended to help police officers easily apprehend criminals. The potion is demonstrated at a professional wrestling event, and The Psycho Twins (one of whom is Carl's old high school friend) accidentally drinks the snooze juice, So Steve & Carl have to fill in for the Real Psycho Twins in the ring, The tag team's opponents, the WWF's Bushwhackers, find out Carl is one of something they hate; cops, which spells trouble for Steve and Carl and leads Eddie and Waldo having to rescue them. Guest stars: The Bushwhackers as Themselves, Lydell M. Cheshier as Kyle, Michael "Shrimp" Chambers as Emile, Johnny Dark as Lou, Gene LeBell as Referee, Andrew Boyer as Announcer, Ferrari Farris as Steve's Nurse, Jeanine Michelle as Carl's Nurse
115	19	"That's What Friends Are For"	Richard Correll	Sheila M. Anthony	March 4, 1994	455370	21.8
Eddie earns a college scholarship, and everyone's cheering for him but Waldo, who feels like he'll lose his friendship with Eddie once he goes off to college. However, Eddie has a surprise for him: he got Waldo into an elite cooking school. Meanwhile, Carl refuses to tell his own family why he doesn't want to take a promotion exam, which could make him a lieutenant. Steve quickly figures out that Carl has a fear of failure, and Estelle urges him to overcome it by taking the exam. He does so and ends up earning the prnmotion. Guest stars: Ellen Albertini Dow as Mrs. Ostendorf, Susan Dawkins as Smiling Customer, Lee Wessof as Man at Drive-Thru, Cheryl Lynn Michaels as Girlfriend
116	20	"Opposites Attract"	Gary Menteer	Felicia D. Henderson	March 18, 1994	455371	21.8
Laura is editor of her school's newspaper, and quickly gets into a series of conflicts with one of the staff writers (Keith Amos). Meanwhile, Steve is robbed and gets the hiccups. Carl helps him with his hiccups and learns they were caused by the trauma he felt during the robbery. Note: Terrence Howard makes an appearance in the cold open as John, a customer at Mighty Weenie whose girlfriend Irene flirts with Steve. Guest stars: Keith Amos as Ziggy, Terrence DaShon Howard as John, Sylver Gregory as Irene
117	21	"A-Camping We Will Go"	Richard Correll	Stephen Langford	April 1, 1994	455372	19.8
Steve tags along on Carl's camping trip with Eddie and Waldo. Steve tries to give Carl some advice, but he refuses to listen...and everyone could soon regret it.
118	22	"Nunsense"	John Tracy	Sara V. Finney & Vida Spears	April 29, 1994	455373	16.5
Steve, offended that his privacy had been violated, tells Myra to get lost when she presents him with a nude drawing of himself. The next morning, Steve learns that Myra is going to a convent, causing the nerd to assume that she plans to join. He quickly enlists Eddie and Waldo to dress as nuns to find Myra and get her to reconsider her joining the nunnery. Of course, she had gone there to visit her aunt, but none of this comes out in the open until the guys are nearly arrested. Meanwhile, Carl becomes annoyed of Harriette's habit of leaving her wedding ring on the soapdish (located very close to the bathroom sink) when she puts on makeup. Guest stars: Judyann Elder as Sister Bernadette, Cherie Franklin as Sister Augustine, Evlynne B. Householder as Aerobics Instructor, Meghan O'Sullivan as Sister Agnes
119	23	"Aunt Oona"	Gary Menteer	David W. Duclon & Gary Menteer	May 6, 1994	455367	15.8
Steve's shy Aunt Oona (Donna Summer) from Altoona visits. Harriette and the others help break Oona out of her shell – by taking her to a karaoke bar for a singing contest. Meanwhile, Eddie and Waldo need to win to pay for an accident caused by Waldo's snowmobile if Eddie needs to get his punishment lifted. Guest stars: Donna Summer as Aunt Oona, Jim Geoghan as Mel Diamond, Fred Fox Jr. as Sukiyaki Singer, The Mighty Echoes as Themselves, Rodney Kageyama as Country Western Singer, Mari Deese as Restaurant Patron
120	24	"Stefan Returns"	John Tracy	Fred Fox, Jr. & Jim Geoghan	May 20, 1994	455374	17.0
Steve, still pining for Laura's heart, renovates his Stefan Urquelle alter ego by inventing a transformation chamber and a chemical to improve his boss sauce to allow him to maintain Steve's sensitivity towards others. He's a much friendlier person this time, but the formula soon wears off just as Laura professes her love for Stefan. Steve is resolved to one day make Stefan permanent. Guest star: Freddie Jackson as Himself

=== Season 6 (1994–95) ===
No. overall	No. in season	Title	Directed by	Written by	Original release date	Prod. code	U.S. viewers (millions)
121	1	"To Be or Not to Be"	John Tracy	Jim Geoghan	September 23, 1994	456201	19.4
122	2	"To Be or Not to Be"	John Tracy	Fred Fox, Jr.	September 30, 1994	456202	18.8
Part 1: Harriette asks Carl to go see an eye doctor after he complains about having problems seeing. However, he balks at the idea and takes Eddie's advice by asking Steve for some help. Steve, meanwhile, has been perfecting his machine to enable him to be Stefan all the time. Carl asks Stefan to let him step into the transformation chamber to fix his eyesight problems. However, a jealous Myra tampers with the machine by switching the dial thinking Stefan will use it to change back into Steve and ensnares him. Unbeknownst to her, Carl is really inside and once she learns the truth, she tells Stefan to stop the chamber. Sure enough, the chamber is broken and Myra realizes what she has done when Carl Urkel (instead of Carl Winslow) steps out! Part 2: Carl spends the next few days walking a mile in Steve's shoes, while Myra explains herself to Stefan. Eventually, Stefan (who has kept Steve's scientific genius, though at a slower rate) repairs the machine, and has him changed back before he can wreak any more havoc on the Winslow household. Carl and Stefan had a better understanding how these two put up with each other. Carl eventually realizes he could have spared everyone so much grief by following his wife's advice and getting glasses. Stefan realize this isn't the real him, it would be a boring world if everybody is the same and he rather be Steve Urkel. Soon after, on Stefan and Laura's date, Stefan tells Laura that he must return as Steve because he felt like Stefan is a fake and Steve is real. When she tries to convince him not to, Stefan confesses he did not recharge before their date and soon reverts to Steve. Guest stars: Lisa Grant as Photographer, Victor Wilson as Waiter, Garcelle Beauvais as Young Mother Winslow, Lisa Grant as Photographer
123	3	"Till Death Do Us Apartment"	Richard Correll	Sheila M. Anthony	October 7, 1994	456203	16.6
College freshmen Eddie and Waldo move into their own apartment, but on their first night, Waldo and Maxine's relationship hits a huge misunderstanding when Eddie brings two girls (Kimberly Russell, Marita Stavrou) home with him, causing them to break up. The girls show sympathy to Waldo and leave Eddie when they learn how narcissistic and egotistical he is. Meanwhile, with Eddie now in college, Steve tries to be a son to Carl. Carl is displeased until he realizes that Steve knows how much he misses Eddie. Carl later makes a surprise visit to Eddie. Guest stars: Kimberly Russell as Darlene, Marita Stavrou as Kim
124	4	"The Looney Bin"	Richard Correll	Felicia D. Henderson	October 14, 1994	456205	17.4
Carl, Steve and Mr. Looney (Tom Poston) become trapped in the school's old fallout shelter. Now Carl has another source of frustration ... Mr. Looney's (pronounced Lew-neigh, it is French; this becomes his catchphrase anytime someone pronounces it Loo-nee) penchant for singing show tunes. Alfred lost everything in a bad investment and was evicted from his apartment. He was staying in a fall out shelter. Carl and Steve talk to Looney about helping him out, but they accidentally lock themselves out of the fallout shelter. That is until Steve sets Carl straight and tells him that singing show tunes helps them pass time while Eddie is seeking help to free them from the shelter. Looney still does not have a home to go to, but Steve helped him out. He offered Looney to stay with him and his family until he gets back on his feet, which Looney accepted. Meanwhile, Harriette continues her search for a new job, and finds a job at the local clothing store in the Complaint Department. Guest stars: Tom Poston as Mr. Looney, Fred Willard as Vice Principal Mallet, F. William Parker as Mr. Waxman, Angus Duncan as Martin, Judith Drake as Complaining Customer, Meghan O'Sullivan as Pizza Delivery Girl
125	5	"Beta Chi Guy"	Richard Correll	Jim Geoghan	October 21, 1994	456204	17.4
Eddie is invited to join a prestigious fraternity, despite the fact that he has to ditch Steve in order to become a member. Laura immediately sets him straight and makes him realize his friendship with Steve is more important to him. Meanwhile, Carl orders a peanut helmet from a shopping network, where you're allowed to try a product for 30 days without paying a single cent. However, Richie and his friend, Lil' G go overboard when they order toys from the same shopping network. Guest stars: Telma Hopkins as Rachel Crawford, Gary LeRoi Gray as Lil' G, S. Kyle Parker as Lyle, Tasha Taylor as Girl at Party, Terri J. Vaughn as Girl #1 at Party, Chris Villa as DJ
126	6	"Dark and Stormy Night"	John Tracy	Fred Fox, Jr. & Jim Geoghan	October 28, 1994	456206	18.1
On a stormy Halloween night, Richie is disappointed because he can't go trick-or-treating. To make it up, Steve, Waldo, and the Winslow clan cheer him up by weaving a 19th-century tale about the Duke of Urkel's battle against a vampire family, the Von Winslows. Guest star: Telma Hopkins as Rachel Crawford
127	7	"Par For the Course"	Richard Correll	Gary M. Goodrich	November 4, 1994	456208	18.8
Carl's sharp-tongued boss, Capt. Savage (Sherman Hemsley), invites him along on a golf outing. Of course, Steve also gets invited by Savage to tag along (due to both of them being cheese fans), and the result is exactly what one would expect. Meanwhile, Harriette and Laura have it out when she starts coming in past curfew. The last straw came when Harriette showed up at a party, wearing a robe and curlers, to drag her daughter home and punished her. Maxine instantly sets Laura straight when she reveals how little her family cares about her well being. Guest star: Sherman Hemsley as Captain Savage
128	8	"Sink or Swim"	Richard Correll	Fred Fox, Jr.	November 11, 1994	456210	20.0
Steve's straight-A record, as well as his high school graduation, are at risk since he can't pass physical education. And to pass physical education, he must pass a simple swimming test. And to pass the simple swimming test, he must get over his fear of water. And to get over his fear of water, he enlists Carl for help. However, Laura ends up being the real source of helping Steve get over his hydrophobia, when she plays a drowning victim. Meanwhile, Richie manages to join a roller skating hockey team, and in order to get equipment, Rachel must return an elegant dress. However, when she goes to return it, there seems to be a torn hole on it. Richie eventually confesses to the crime to stop Harriette and Rachel from fighting. Guest stars: Telma Hopkins as Rachel Crawford, Eddie Mekka as Mr. Nutting, Billy Boulton as Ricky, Marcia Jeffries as Customer
129	9	"Paradise Bluff"	John Tracy	Sara V. Finney & Vida Spears	November 18, 1994	456209	19.9
On a date to Paradise Bluff, Myra gives Steve an ultimatum – commit to her now, or else it is over. Steve is about to let her go by reaffirming his love for Laura, but then a near accident with his BMW Isetta puts both of their lives in danger. After quickly coming up with a way to save their lives, Steve agrees to commit to Myra for now. Meanwhile, Harriette tries to show Carl a barbecue article from a women's magazine that she borrowed from her hairstylist. However, he accidentally looks at the "Rate Your Mate" article and thinks that she surveyed him poorly. Harriette clears up the misunderstanding and reveals that her hairdresser did the quiz and rated her husband poorly. All she asked for Carl to do is look at barbecue recipes for inspiration and he apologizes for it. Harriette admits had she done the quiz herself, he would have ranked higher. Guest star: Telma Hopkins as Rachel Crawford
130	10	"Flying Blind"	Kelly Sandefur	Stephen Langford	November 25, 1994	456207	15.8
Carl and Steve are passengers on a charter flight. The plane is hijacked by Tony The Farret, a crook that Carl put away several years ago and is back for revenge. He skydives out of the plane, leaving Carl and Steve to get a crash course in how to fly a plane. Also, Carl puts Eddie on a budget so he can pay off a $75 electric bill. Meanwhile, Laura is depressed that Carl and Steve won't be able to attend one of the last meetings they planned earlier on. Guest stars: Joe Keyes as Tony the Ferret, Joel Anderson as Flight Instructor, Thom Sharp as Control Tower Voice
131	11	"Miracle on Elm Street"	Richard Correll	Fred Fox, Jr. & Jim Geoghan	December 16, 1994	456211	18.3
Richie brings home a homeless man (Art Evans) for Christmas, much to the Winslows' chagrin, but he winds up teaching them a holiday lesson about the meaning of the season. The Winslows helped him out and found a halfway house for him to live at until he gets back on his feet. The homeless man tells Carl that he is Santa Claus and remind him of a gift that he wanted was a kid, although Carl thinks the homeless man is crazy. Meanwhile, Eddie accidentally throws out Laura's rag doll from her childhood. Laura becomes heartsick over the doll's apparent fate, prompting Steve to visit a landfill in an all-out attempt to rescue the doll. Steve found the doll in a dumpster and give it to Laura and made a friend Howard the dog. Carl also got the gift that he wanted when he was a kid and realize the homeless man is Santa Claus. Guest stars: Art Evans as Ben, Telma Hopkins as Rachel Crawford
132	12	"Midterm Crisis"	Joel Zwick	Stephen Langford	January 6, 1995	456212	23.1
Waldo baked a gourmet cake for his mid-term, which is sure to get a passing grade. However, he never turns his assignment in, thanks to a hungry Eddie and Steve, who quickly attempts to cover up the situation by baking the same cake for his mid-term (which is a lot harder than they expected since neither Eddie nor Steve have no experience in baking). Eventually, Waldo finds out and reprimands them for their greed. Meanwhile, Carl and Harriette invite Capt. Savage over to their house, but Savage's date Lois (Mariann Aalda) makes Carl suspicious about where he's seen her before and realizes she used to work at a local strip club when he was out on patrol interviewing a potential informant. When Carl tells Capt. Savage about it, he is surprised to find out that Savage already knew and punishes him for it. So now he must confront Harriette for giving him the wrong advice. Guest stars: Sherman Hemsley as Captain Savage, Mariann Aalda as Lois
133	13	"An Unlikely Match"	Gregg Heschong	Sara V. Finney & Vida Spears	January 20, 1995	456215	22.3
Steve learns that a bully, Andre (Lamont Bentley), has become stricken with leukemia, due to smoking cigarettes. Steve does the right thing and puts aside the past and, with Laura's help, stages a bone marrow drive to save his life. When Andre discovers Steve's act of kindness, he is grateful that he gives up being Steve's bully and befriends him. Meanwhile, Harriette wants to get new furniture for the living room, despite the fact that it'll cost $3,000 to do so. Carl, in his usual skinflint form, learns from his boss Capt. Savage that he could get furniture for cheap at a police auction. Harriette is displeased with it and eventually Carl agrees to get their old furniture back.: At the end of the episode, in a PSA message, Kellie Shanygne Williams and Jaleel White talk to the audience about bone marrow testing, to help out people diagnosed with leukemia.; Guest stars: Lamont Bentley as Andre, Sherman Hemsley as Captain Savage, Terence Mathews as Roscoe, Benny Grant as Student, Andrea White as Volunteer
134	14	"The Substitute Son"	Richard Correll	Story by : Reginald VelJohnson; Teleplay by : Fred Fox, Jr. & Jim Geoghan	February 3, 1995	456216	20.0
Eddie has no time to spend with Carl, so Waldo decides to spend time with him instead. Once he watches the two spend time with each other and leave for a Chicago Bulls basketball game, Eddie is jealous and takes his anger out on his dirty sack of laundry. When Harriette and Mother Winslow comes in, Eddie blames Waldo for interfering. A furious Harriette disagrees and admonishes her lame-brained son for being selfish. She points out that Eddie deserved to have the favor returned to him for his behavior. When Eddie tries to defend himself, she recalls two previous incidents that proves her point. The first time was when Eddie promised to go bowling with Carl, just to stand him up so the former can go out on his date with a girl from a college bookstore. She also recalls another incident with the car show in which he stood Carl up and never called him to cancel because he was out on a date (which she had found out about from Waldo). Harriette unsympathetically mentions that Eddie only has himself to blame and she wants him to stop taking his father for granted. Mother Winslow's words hit home to Eddie and he feels guilty when he learned the truth in why Carl wanted to spend time with him. After Carl comes home, Eddie apologizes for his actions and promises to spend more time with him. Meanwhile, Steve is beat up by a bunch of ruffians, so he gets his revenge as Bruce Lee Urkel! Guest stars: David Lea as Jack, Carl Ciarfalio as Arm Wrestler, Jeff Langton as Thug, James Lew as Man in Bar, Robert Wall as Himself, Thunderwolf as Man with Tattoo
135	15	"The Gun"	John Tracy	Joseph Cvar & Gary Menteer	February 10, 1995	456214	19.7
Gang member Toni Procopio (Tracey Cherelle Jones) and her friends brutally beat Laura up over her jacket. After being arrested and let out on bail, Toni and her gang tell Laura that she can expect to get shot if she testifies against them again. Scared for her life, Laura decides she needs to buy a gun for self-defense, but Steve begs her to reconsider. Moments before Laura can go through with the gun purchase, Toni shoots her other best friend Josie (Trina McGee-Davis) because she refused to give Toni her shoes. Fortunately, the Winslows and Steve start "Save a Life, Turn In Your Gun" and Steve does a rap about saving your life by turning in a gun or other weapons.: At the end of the episode, in a PSA message, Kellie Shanygne Williams and Jaleel White, along with the cast of the episode, talk to the audience about having a gun in school is dangerous and how everyone should work together to stop it.; Freddie Prinze Jr appears as a tough guy who refuses to give up his gun and also appears in the PSA message at the end of the episode.; Guest stars: Tracey Cherelle Jones as Toni Procopio, Trina McGee-Davis as Josie, Freddie Prinze Jr. as Tough Guy, Ryan Bollman as Gun Salesman, Sonya Haynes as Tough Girl #1, Kyndra Joy Casper as Tough Girl #2, Raushan Hammond as Latin Club Member, Mailon Rivera as DJ
136	16	"Wedding Bell Blues"	Richard Correll	Sheila M. Anthony	February 17, 1995	456220	17.6
Mr. Looney is engaged to be married, but on his wedding day, his bride leaves him at the altar thanks to a jilted ex-lover who comes up with a phony excuse for her to take him back. Humiliated, Mr. Looney contemplates suicide, leaving Steve and Carl to talk him out of it. They do with the help of an old friend of Looney's who works as a police officer and she shows interest in him. Meanwhile, Laura gets upset when her parents won't let her go with her friends to see Seal in Toledo for one night, despite letting Eddie go to Canada for 4 days with people Carl and Harriette don't know. The reason why Carl and Harriett let's Eddie go away for four days, because Eddie is in college and he is over 18 and he doesn't live in the Winslow house anymore and that is why. Soon they see the error of their ways and allow her to go to the concert providing that she keeps a cell phone with her. Guest stars: Tom Poston as Mr. Looney, Sondra Currie as Sharon, Lewis Dauber as Minister Barnes, Channing Chase as Beth, Susan Dawkins as Rebecca, Carl Strano as Stan
137	17	"Ain't Nothing but an Urkel"	Kelly Sandefur	Stephen Langford	February 24, 1995	456218	18.2
To impress an MIT college recruiter, Steve demonstrates his transformation chamber. Instead of turning into an Albert Einstein variant, he makes himself into Elvis Urkel by mistake. The hunka-hunka-burning Urkel and his blue suede shoes scare the daylights out of the recruiter, which threatens his acceptance into the college. Meanwhile, Pastor Fuller (Johnny Brown) recruit Carl and Harriette to help out a young couple (Spencer Garrett, Heather Morgan) who are planning marriage. However, while doing so, Carl and Harriette uncover their own problems. Guest stars: Johnny Brown as Pastor Fuller, Spencer Garrett as Larry Johnson, Richard Kline as Mr. Fleming, Heather Morgan as Marilyn
138	18	"My Uncle, the Hero"	John Tracy	Gary M. Goodrich	March 3, 1995	456217	20.0
Richie's class takes a field trip to the police station, with tour guide Carl trying desperately to keep the dull tour afloat. Soon the class are impressed when he shows a criminal the dangers of his actions if he kills an innocent police officer. Meanwhile, Steve and Laura plan a surprise birthday party for Myra. Of course, she thinks the two are fooling around behind her back. However, Myra soon ruins it when she learns from Waldo that they were planning her surprise birthday party in secret and owes both Steve and Laura an apology. Guest stars: Michael Prozzo as Robinson, Annie Gagen as Mrs. Melville, Gary LeRoi Gray as Lil' G, Christopher Michael as Police Officer, Marcus Toji as Little Boy, Shekinah Williams as Little Girl
139	19	"My Bodyguard"	John Tracy	Felicia D. Henderson	March 17, 1995	456221	18.8
After foiling a robbery attempt by accidentally knocking out the crook with a broom, Steve receives a series of threats from the crook's brother, prompting Carl to become his bodyguard. Meanwhile, Eddie gets a new girlfriend, Greta (Tammy Townsend), who happens to be the daughter of Dave McClure (Ron Canada), the owner of Mighty Weenie. When Greta is out of earshot, Mr. McClure demands that Eddie treat Greta well, threatening to fire him. So, he tries to be a gentleman to Greta, who tries to seduce him. When he fires Eddie for seemingly seducing Greta into kissing him, she gives her father a piece of her mind and he eventually relents to let her date Eddie. Guest stars: Ron Canada as Dave McClure, Greg Collins as Officer Miller, Kathryn Joosten as Grocery Checker, David St. James as Joey, Tammy Townsend as Greta McClure, Richard Vidan as Ricky
140	20	"Cheers Looking at You, Kid"	John Tracy	Bob Illes & James R. Stein	March 24, 1995	456213	17.2
Steve spies on Laura during her latest trip to a cheerleading convention in Omaha, Nebraska. He suspects that her newest boyfriend has less than innocent intentions on her. Meanwhile, Waldo tries getting there by his own inventive way of surprising Maxine at the convention shipping himself to her room in a giant box. However, he needs proofreading skills since he wrote inaccurate mailing addresses and a delivery man shows up at the Winslow House to return the box. Guest stars: Craig Kirkwood as Gary Menteer, Venus DeMilo Thomas as K.C., Bob Glouberman as Bellhop, Martin Grey as Delivery Man, Mindy Sterling as Coach, Susan Dawkins as Cheerleader
141	21	"What's Up Doc?"	Richard Correll	Fred Fox, Jr. & Jim Geoghan	March 31, 1995	456219	18.9
After dealing with Steve's antics for six years, the Winslows visit a family psychiatrist (Thom Sharp) to air their grievances about Steve in this clip show... well, Carl, Eddie and Laura do, anyway. However, Harriette is dismayed and tells the psychiatrist that while Steve may seem bothersome at times, he's had plenty of virtues too. When Carl challenges her to name two times, Harriette points out every single kind thing Steve has done for the Winslows, which even Eddie and Laura agree with. Guest stars: Thom Sharp as Dr. Miller, Rachel True as Sue, Telma Hopkins as Rachel Crawford, Jaimee Foxworth as Judy Winslow, Lisa Colbert as Receptionist
142	22	"We're Going to Disney World"	Richard Correll	Jim Geoghan	April 28, 1995	456224	16.2
143	23	"We're Going to Disney World"	Richard Correll	Fred Fox Jr.	May 5, 1995	456225	17.8
Part 1: Thanks to Steve's transformation chamber, he is a semi-finalist in a science competition at Walt Disney World Resort and invites the Winslows along. During the final demonstrations, Steve changes into Stefan and Laura sabotages the machine, forcing the judging of the contest to be delayed three days while Stefan waits for repair parts. In the interim, he and Laura spend a romantic time together. Meanwhile, Carl, having the time of his life, decides to quit the police force and move the family to Orlando. Meanwhile in order to save money, Eddie rides in Waldo's truck from Chicago to Orlando. He ends up being angry at Waldo when he learns he had gone the wrong way and driving to towards Canada (due to Waldo's poor map-reading skills). During one night of the vacation, Stefan proposes to Laura, leading Myra to jolt awake 1,100 miles away in Chicago, sensing something is wrong. Part 2: Myra arrives at Disney World to find Stefan engaged to Laura. Upset by Myra's heartbroken reaction, Laura confesses her sabotage and hoping Stefan would stay this way. He is angry at her for her selfish behavior in sabotaging his chamber and reprimands her for it. Stefan tells Laura, he can't marry her because of her actions in hurting both him and Myra. He later forgives her when she urges him to fix the chamber and turn back into Steve. Meanwhile, Carl weighs the gravity of his decision to move to Orlando, being relaxed in Disney World. Harriette tricks him into believing Capt. Savage has replaced him in his precinct and their neighbors wouldn't miss them. Aghast, he decides to return home, until he learns she tricked him. In Canada, Eddie and Waldo pick up a female hitchhiker who ends up stealing Waldo's truck. Guest stars: Telma Hopkins as Rachel Crawford, Steve Witting as Martin, David L. Lander as Oliver, Shari Ballard as Zoralee Rasmussen, JD Roberto as Bellboy, Russell Sanderlin Sr. as Wedding Guest, David Spates as Audience Member, John Hagy as Patron in Shop, Anthony Franco as Vincenzo, Phynjuar as Mitzi Monkhouse, Tanya Wright as India, Mike Guy as Science Fair Judge
144	24	"They Shoot Urkels, Don't They?"	John Tracy	Story by : Stephen Langford; Teleplay by : Sara V. Finney & Vida Spears	May 12, 1995	456223	15.7
Steve and Carl enter a dance marathon hosted by Fletcher (Whitman Mayo, replacing Arnold Johnson) and Estelle, but because the two are so competitive with each other, they both stay up all night dancing until one of them finally gives up. However, Harriette and Myra are sick of their competition and leave them on the dance floor. Soon Steve and Carl realize the consequences of their competitive nature and apologize to each other, even Harriette and Myra.: Note: All-4-One appear as themselves and perform "(She's Got) Skillz".; Guest stars: Whitman Mayo as Fletcher Thomas, Cerita Monet Bickelmann as Elizabeth, Jabu Dinani as Bob, Terri J. Vaughn as Eddie's Date, Montae Russell as DJ, All-4-One as Themselves
145	25	"Home Sweet Home"	John Tracy	Sara V. Finney & Vida Spears	May 19, 1995	456222	13.2
Steve's father invents a microscopic camera that lets doctors insert it into patient's brains to search for brain damage. He is asked to showcase the camera in hospitals across Russia, prompting them to move. Steve, not wanting to move away from his friends, tries to think of an idea. Carl, not wanting the nerd to move in with him, convinces Eddie to let Steve move in with him and Waldo. However, when his mutant termites are a little too hungry, they break loose and eat the entire apartment (thanks to Waldo unwittingly dropping the container when trying to get his jacket). Once their apartment is destroyed, Eddie and Waldo are forced to move back home. Meanwhile as a reward for straight A's, Harriette and Maxine shop for a dress for Laura, but Laura dislikes it and learns to compromise with Maxine. When Eddie moves back home, Steve comes for a visit one last time to bid the Winslows farewell. Carl is excited at the prospects of having Steve move to Russia and greedily decides to bid him farewell. However, when Eddie uses the same convincing against him, Carl reluctantly decides to allow Steve to move in with them. Special Guest Star: Lark Voorhies as Dream Girl

=== Season 7 (1995–96) ===
No. overall	No. in season	Title	Directed by	Written by	Original release date	Prod. code	U.S. viewers (millions)
146	1	"Little Big Guy"	Richard Correll	Fred Rubin	September 22, 1995	457101	19.3
Steve's transformation chamber is going berserk. He and Carl are shrunk to two inches tall, and as a result must work together to dodge hazards such as rolling fruit and large house cats. Guest star: Kellie Beals as Park Ranger
147	2	"The Naked and the Nerdy"	Richard Correll	Stephen Langford	September 29, 1995	457102	17.2
Steve and Laura accidentally see each other naked in the bathroom, and are embarrassed to speak to each other afterward. Eddie wisely helps them out by telling Steve and Laura of his own experience in catching Carl and Harriette naked as a child. Meanwhile, Carl does a favor for his neighbor, Larry Johnson (Spencer Garrett), in the form of keeping his wife's gift (a diamond bracelet) hidden at his home. However, when Harriette mistakes it as her anniversary gift, Carl must set things straight. Guest star: Spencer Garrett as Larry Johnson
148	3	"Bugged"	Richard Correll	Fred Fox, Jr.	October 13, 1995	457103	15.7
Steve fights temptation as he fantasizes about a beautiful bug collector (Amy Hunter) he met in an online chat room. He worries that his desire to kiss her will interfere with his relationship with Myra and seeks Laura's advice. When Laura encourages him to tell Myra, he refuses imagining her anger and jealousy. Meanwhile, Harriette asks Carl to allow her boss, Nick Neidermeyer (Ron Orbach), to participate in his weekly poker game. However, he acts very rude when he keeps winning, testing Carl's patience particularly since her standing at work may be on the line. Harriette loses her patience with Nick and tells him off that she won't tolerate his disrespectful behavior. She dares him to fire her, only for him to reveal a shocking surprise: He can't fire Harriette! It turns out Nick had been transferred to the automotive department, allowing both her and Carl to get revenge on him by throwing a pie in his face. The other poker players applaud as Carl escorts Nick out of his home. Later on, Carl and his friends are enjoying playing poker with Harriette. Guest stars: Joel Anderson as Charlie Sullivan, Amy Hunter as Agnes Pritzker, Ron Orbach as Nick Neidermeyer, Iqbal Theba as Zoohair Bhutto, Marlon Young as Willie
149	4	"Teacher's Pet"	Richard Correll	Stephen Langford	October 20, 1995	457108	16.3
Steve is asked to supervise an English class for his absent teacher, but the students in the class are unruly and have no intention of learning. They eventually embarrass the nerd and push him to the point where he wants to quit. However, Steve has an ace up his sleeve – Stefan Urquelle, who immediately takes control of the class and helps one student with a date for the homecoming dance. Meanwhile, Carl and Harriette bicker over each other's share of the household chores. However, hiring extra help, particularly, attractive members of the opposite sex only exacerbates matters. In the end, Carl and Harriette agree to divide the housework more fairly. Guest stars: Eric Poppick as Mr. Ludke, Walter Jones as Kissel, Brooke Marie Procida as Donna Santangelo, Renee Tenison as Tawny, John Patrick White as Robbins, Carey Brayboy as Geoffrey, Tim Padilla as Poetry Student, Sanetta Gipson as Audience Member #1, Julie Uribe as Audience Member #2
150	5	"Walking My Baby Back Home"	Richard Correll	Gary M. Goodrich	October 27, 1995	457107	14.6
When Eddie brings new girlfriend Greta (Tammy Townsend) home after curfew, her father (Ron Canada) refuses to allow her to see him for a month. Eddie wants to see Greta again, so he arranges for Steve to act as his go-between, but that only lands Steve in trouble because of an unexpected flat tire. However, when Mr. McClure finds out again, Eddie is fired when he accepts responsibility for himself rather than let Steve take the fall. Steve calls out Mr. McClure for his brash actions and tells him off, saying that if Mr. McClure is the kind of person who fires people for being responsible for their actions, Steve refuses to work for him at Mighty Weenie again. Mr. McClure agrees to allow Eddie and Greta to date again, after one month. Meanwhile, Estelle is audited by the Internal Revenue Service, and Carl finds himself in trouble with the tax man as well when he tries to help her straighten the matter out. Guest stars: Ron Canada as Dave McClure, Tammy Townsend as Greta McClure, Steve Vinovich as Simon Kincaid, Ziggy Marley and the Melody Makers as Themselves
151	6	"She's Back"	Joel Zwick	Jim Geoghan	November 3, 1995	457110	17.9
Steve goes to Russia to visit his parents for a week, giving the Winslows a few days of not to be pestered by him. However, Myrtle shows up, hungrier than ever for Eddie's affections. Only this time, Myrtle has to get through Greta first. Meanwhile, Carl and Harriette must deal with a broken garbage disposal. Guest star: Tammy Townsend as Greta McClure
152	7	"Hot Rods to Heck"	Joel Zwick	Fred Fox, Jr.	November 10, 1995	457111	17.9
Steve finds himself competing with another in a long line of Laura's boyfriends, this time drag racer Curtis Williams. Eventually, the two get on each other's nerves so much that Steve is left with no choice but to tune up his Isetta (apparently, repaired from last season's accident) and challenge the big-talking Curtis to a winner-take-all race. Soon Myra is fed up with Laura's selfishness and reprimands her for it. She reveals Steve's real reason he's competing in the race, which makes Laura feel guilty for taking their friendship for granted. Even though Steve wins the race, he is nearly injured and she sets Curtis straight for not informing her of the dangers of drag racing. Afterwards, Laura apologizes to Steve and Myra for her poor judgment. Meanwhile, Eddie learns how to compromise between him living at home and inviting his friends over at home. Guest stars: Lamont Johnson as Bone Crusher, Jarrad Paul as Kevin, J. Lamont Pope as Curtis Williams, Steve Rozic as P.J.
153	8	"Talk's Cheap"	Richard Correll	Fred Fox, Jr. & Jim Geoghan	November 17, 1995	457113	17.5
Steve, his southern belle cousin Myrtle Urkel, and the nerd's alter-ego, Stefan Urquelle, each appear on a talk show (the host played by Jo Marie Payton's Perfect Strangers co-star Melanie Wilson) to discuss relationships. Appearing with them are the objects of each one's affections: Myra, Eddie and Laura. Waldo also tags along, but this time, what he says actually makes sense. Also, Harriette believes Carl cares more about the news than her, but it's soon revealed that he only likes watching the news in order to cope with his lack of romantic drive. Guest stars: Melanie Wilson as Tiffany, Robert Axelrod as Paul McCartney Look Alike, Lira Angel as Audience Member #1, Leo D. Frank as Stage Manager, Sanetta Y. Gipson as Audience Member #2, Julie Uribe as Audience Member #3
154	9	"Struck by Lightning"	Joel Zwick	Jim Geoghan	November 24, 1995	457104	14.7
For some reason, Steve becomes a human lightning rod and soon develops an intense fear of thunderstorms. Meanwhile, Laura and Myra both apply for sales clerk jobs at Ferguson's Dept. Store, but only one position is available. Both annoy each other as they audition for the job. Eventually, Mr. Waxman chooses Laura for the job. She refuses and believes her mother had something to do with his decision. Mr. Waxman explains that Harriette had nothing to do with his decision. He admits even though Myra had higher sales, she also got twice as many returned items because the customers perceive her as conceited and ignorant to their feelings with her lies. Waxman also tells Laura that she cares about the customers' feelings and therefore she deserves the job. At the house, Carl and Harriette encourage Steve to experiment on himself, which is later revealed that due to his constant uses of his transformation chamber that he has produced an unlimited quantity of iron. Despite warning Carl to leave the jar containing the iron inside the house, he ignores it and is electrocuted. Carl ends up chasing Steve around again. Guest star: F. William Parker as Mr. Waxman
155	10	"Best Years of Our Lives"	Joel Zwick	Sara V. Finney & Vida Spears	December 8, 1995	457106	18.0
Steve is put in charge of the senior class homecoming float and despite some bumbling by the nerd and his classmates, the float becomes a huge success. Even better, everyone starts to get to really know one another, and that's something everyone can be proud of, even if Steve ruins the float when transporting it to school. Meanwhile, Estelle's constant activities fear Carl about her health until he learns why. Guest stars: Ed Cambridge as Fletcher Thomas, Fred Willard as Vice Principal Mallet, Patrick Y. Malone as Jeff, Brooke Procida as Donna Santangelo, Lorna Scott as Homeroom Teacher
156	11	"Fa La La La Laagghh!"	Richard Correll	Meg DeLoatch	December 15, 1995	457114	17.7
Just in time for Christmas, Carl gets in a sour mood and refuses to allow Steve to decorate the house with his crazy light displays. Then, at his poker game, one of his friends says there is a big cash prize for the neighborhood lighting contest, and Carl's mood instantly changes, which Steve has no idea about. Soon he learns the truth after they come crashing down in the kitchen. An angry Steve sets Carl straight for lying to him and being greedy in wanting to win the prize money, rather than make children happy. Meanwhile, Harriette wants a little more participation from Eddie and Laura in the family's holiday activities. Estelle teaches them the true meaning of Christmas when she stops making her batch of gingerbread cookies. Feeling guilty about their behavior, Eddie and Laura decide to help Harriette out with the activities. Guest stars: Joel Anderson as Charlie Sullivan, Iqbal Theba as Zoohair Bhutto, Marlon Young as Willie
157	12	"Friendship Cycles"	Joel Zwick	Sheila M. Anthony	January 5, 1996	457105	19.2
Carl is once again pressed into service to teach Steve how to do something simple this time: riding a bicycle. The usual hijinks ensue. Maxine ponders cosmetology school and although Laura is against it, she realizes her friend's happiness is more important. Note: This episode is dedicated to Palmer Brown, Men's costume department who passed away from AIDS.
158	13	"South of the Border"	Richard Correll	Joseph Cvar & Gary Menteer	January 12, 1996	457109	20.0
Waldo learns about the laws of a tiny island nation the hard way. It lands him in jail and causes Eddie, Steve, and Carl to have to make a long-distance trip to bail their buddy out, and Carl won't pay a $10,000 bail which he thinks is $10,000 American dollars, which is really $30 American dollars (which nobody learns until much later, when Steve asks the leader about it). Meanwhile, Harriette organizes a blind date for Laura with a guy majoring in Geology, Junior. She refuses to go on the date and believes he will be a nerd (due to her own relationship with Steve). Later, she meets a handsome pizza delivery guy named David, whom she wishes that she was on a date with instead of Junior. However, when Junior arrives, it is revealed that he is David. Laura happily goes out with him. Guest stars: Abraham Alvarez as Officer Garcia, Damian Perkins as David Phillips Jr., Fred Rubin as Caballero
159	14	"Life in the Fast Lane"	Joel Zwick	Gregory Thomas Garcia	January 26, 1996	457112	19.2
Laura, concerned about her figure, begins taking diet pills because the new head cheerleader told her she was fat and needs to lose weight. One day, Steve mistakes the pills for Vitamin C, which he had been borrowing from Laura, and goes into a stupor that nearly results in the Winslow garage being destroyed and the nerd almost seriously injuring himself. Soon, Harriette tells her to drop the diet pills because she thinks the cheerleaders are just jealous of how great she looks. Guest stars: Angelle Brooks as Monica, Venus DeMilo Thomas as K.C.
160	15	"Random Acts of Science"	Richard Correll	David W. Duclon & Gary Menteer	February 2, 1996	457116	20.4
When Steve's contraptions go haywire once too often, Carl demands that the nerd must put every single invention in storage. On the night that they go about putting everything away at the Chicago Police Warehouse, a street gang (known as Satan's Serpents) breaks in in an attempt to steal the stored weapons and holds both Carl and Steve hostage. Steve tells the gang that the transformation chamber works with the green liquid, "Bruce Juice", but he tricked them into thinking that it was anyone other than Bruce Lee. Both Carl and Steve enter the chamber and are transformed into figures similar to Bruce Lee (Bruce Lee Urkel and Bruce Lee Winslow). Meanwhile, Laura weighs in the possibility of getting a Nose ring, but later decides she's better off without one. Guest stars: Brooke Marie Procida as Donna Santangelo, Michael Bailey Smith as Snap, Philip Tan as Snap's Gang Member, Oscar Dillon as Sidekick
161	16	"Tips for a Better Life"	Joel Zwick	David W. Duclon & Gary Menteer	February 9, 1996	457121	16.6
After Steve accidentally damages Carl's master bedroom floor with his latest invention, Carl selfishly yells at Steve. Steve decides to takes a second job at Cafe Java in order to pay for it and transforms into his alter ego Stefan Urquelle, not wanting to be banished by Carl, and playing smooth jazz, giving the Winslows a few nights of not being pestered by him. Meanwhile, Eddie battles the bottle as he begins coming home drunk from frat parties. After doing so one too many times, Carl kicks him out. His situation turns worse when Waldo refuses to let Eddie to move in with him, as he had previously insulted and hurt Waldo while intoxicated. Waldo tells Eddie off for this and breaks off their friendship until he agrees to stop drinking, saying that anyone who drinks and insults others are no friends of his. This causes Eddie to finally get the message and vow to give up drinking; he reconciles with Waldo, and Carl allows him to stay home again. Guest stars: Greg Proops as Cafe Manager, Tangie Ambrose as Girl #1, La Sondra Zarif as Girl #2
162	17	"Swine Lake"	Joel Zwick	Stephen Langford	February 16, 1996	457120	18.1
To improve his basketball skills, Eddie (with Greta's encouragement) takes ballet lessons. Steve and Waldo are enjoying a few yuks, which embarrasses Eddie. The two are all set to perform as partners in a recital, but there's one problem: Steve's cousin Myrtle. Later on, Greta soon shows up with her hands cuffed to a sink, due to Myrtle's tampering. Meanwhile, after accidentally being called "grandmother" by Laura's latest boyfriend, Curtis, Harriette tries dressing herself in youthful clothes in order to feel young, but later decides to dress like herself when Carl tells her she still looks young in his eyes. Guest stars: J. Lamont Pope as Curtis Williams, Tammy Townsend as Greta McClure, Mary Woronov as Mrs. Ramsay, Chelsea Hackett as Ballet Dancer, Andre Paradis as Ballet Dancer
163	18	"My Big Brother"	Richard Correll	Fred Rubin	February 23, 1996	457122	18.6
Steve becomes a Big Brother to a smart-talking, streetwise nine-year-old named 3J (Orlando Brown). However, 3J's bravado is a cover for an embarrassing secret: The boy cannot read. So Steve decides to teach him, but 3J refuses, fearing he will break his promise like the other Big Brothers he had. Steve reassures him that isn't like the others and he always kept his promises. Meanwhile, Carl finds out that Harriette has a separate savings account, making him question his faith in his own wife and later regrets it when he learns about his surprise present she bought for him. Guest stars: Orlando Brown as 3J, María Costa as Dornita, Mayah Aishah McCoy as Chante, Natalie Desselle as Baby Girl, William Thomas Jr. as Mr. Lasker
164	19	"Eau de love"	Richard Correll	Fred Rubin	March 8, 1996	457117	18.8
Steve accidentally pours his aphrodisiac potion (a.k.a. Woo Woo Juice) on himself, causing Laura to fall in love with him. However, Steve knows he still has plenty of work to do to make the girl of his dreams truly fall in love with him once the potion wears off in a week. Until that time, he must hide the smell and Laura's amorous affections from Myra. Meanwhile, Carl and Harriette are having trouble trying to get to their second honeymoon thanks to a bankrupt airline and a lot of snow. Guest stars: Patricia Bethune as Optimistic Ticket Agent, Terry Sweeney as Snooty Ticket Agent, Julie Fowler as Perky Ticket Agent, Leo D. Frank III as Janitor, Julie Simon as Flight Attendant
165	20	"Twinkle Toes Faldo"	Joel Zwick	Felicia D. Henderson	March 15, 1996	457115	17.5
In the second ballet-based episode of the season, this time it is klutzy Waldo who learns tap dance, which in turn will help him in 3-on-3 basketball with Eddie and Steve. Meanwhile, Laura's high ambitions of going to Harvard University are in jeopardy when Carl's unable to pay the tuition. However, Laura soon realizes the truth and offers to go to another college just to be closer to home. Guest stars: Donovan McCrary as Kenny "The Spider" Jackson, Wesley Thompson as Phil Hallenback, Sam Sarpong as Basketball Player #1
166	21	"Scammed"	Richard Correll	Gary M. Goodrich	March 29, 1996	457118	15.8
A smooth-talking scam artist (Mark L. Taylor) cons Eddie and Waldo into patronizing an exclusive sports bar (the Ace High Lounge) where the Chicago Bulls hang out. After ignoring Steve's warning not to go inside because he suspected foul play, the con-man leaves them with an expensive bill and Eddie must get help from Carl, but not without instructing Waldo to lie to him to borrow money instead, hoping to avoid confessing to his father. Carl, however, is smart enough to know better and forces Waldo to confess to what happened. He has the con-man and his employees arrested. Meanwhile, Myra tries to help Laura with an all-natural zit-removal mask using cooking ingredients, but mistakes Steve's super glue for milk. When Steve comes home and finds out, he and Myra must get the mask removed from Laura's face before her date arrives. Guest stars: Mark L. Taylor as Frank, Jazsmin Lewis as Yvette, Gretchen Palmer as Chondra, Walter Franks as Doorman, Carl Gilliard as Waiter, Marc Mazur as Bouncer #1, Amy Payne as Flower Lady, Elston Ridgle as Bouncer #2
167	22	"Dream Date"	Joel Zwick	Fred Fox, Jr. & Jim Geoghan	April 26, 1996	457124	13.7
While getting ready for the senior prom, Vice Principal Mallet requests to Steve that he not come to the prom since he ruined the last one, but Steve decides to go anyway. Meanwhile, Laura is excited about going to the prom. However, since Curtis' grandmother had just died and Myra fell ill at the last moment, Steve and Laura are unable to go to the prom. So, they decide to go together and it proves to be Laura's dream come true—and a once-in-a-lifetime night for Steve as well. Meanwhile, Harriette's obnoxious former boss, Nick Neidermeyer, returns. This time, he's the Winslows' next-door neighbor. He orders Carl to take down his fence, but Carl won't do it. This leads into a neighbor vs. neighbor battle, until Harriette sets them straight by telling them to help each other instead of fighting. Nick insults Carl, leading the former to be covered in manure. Guest stars: Ron Orbach as Nick Neidermeyer, Fred Willard as Vice Principal Mallet, J. Lamont Pope as Curtis Williams, Brooke Marie Procida as Donna Santangelo, John Patrick White as Robbins, Anne Zogby as Student
168	23	"A Ham Is Born"	Joel Zwick	Gregory Thomas Garcia	May 10, 1996	457119	11.7
To bring in extra income into the Winslow household, Carl gets a job as a security guard at a movie studio. In the process, he lands a leading role in a movie, but then has a moral dilemma on his hands: With a passionate kissing scene in the script, should he risk developing real feelings for his gorgeous co-star (Garcelle Beauvais). Meanwhile, Steve helps Richie with his science project. Guest stars: Garcelle Beauvais as Nicole Moses, Steven Benjamin Davis as Chazz, James Nardini as Luke, Jim Pirri as Jake, Meghan O'Sullivan as Camera Assistant
169	24	"Send In the Clone"	Richard Correll	David W. Duclon & Gary Menteer	May 17, 1996	457123	12.0
Steve's cloning machine can make exact duplicates of anything; including himself, causing double trouble throughout the household and putting Myra in a frenzy. When Laura shows up and puts the two Steves in place, she gives out her own opinion in how Steve created a monster with his cloning machine. When the real Steve thinks there is no solution, Laura offers him a smart idea. Still missing Stefan, she suggests that Steve put the clone into the transformation chamber and make the alter-ego Stefan a permanent human. Steve likes this idea and puts the clone in the chamber. The idea is successful with Laura getting Stefan back, while Steve is able to save his own relationship with Myra. Guest star: Orlando Brown as 3J

=== Season 8 (1996–97) ===
No. overall	No. in season	Title	Directed by	Written by	Original release date	Prod. code	U.S. viewers (millions)
170	1	"Paris Vacation"	Richard Correll	Fred Fox, Jr. & Jim Geoghan	September 20, 1996 (Parts 1 & 2) September 27, 1996 (Part 3)	465301	15.4 (Parts 1 & 2) 15.1 (Part 3)
171	2	"Paris Vacation"	Richard Correll	Fred Fox, Jr. & Jim Geoghan	September 20, 1996 (Parts 1 & 2) September 27, 1996 (Part 3)	465302	15.4 (Parts 1 & 2) 15.1 (Part 3)
172	3	"Paris Vacation"	Richard Correll	Fred Fox, Jr. & Jim Geoghan	September 20, 1996 (Parts 1 & 2) September 27, 1996 (Part 3)	465302	15.4 (Parts 1 & 2) 15.1 (Part 3)
Part 1: The Winslows travel to Paris, France with the help of Steve's teleportation device, the Urk-Pad. There, Eddie has to work at a restaurant to avoid going to jail, while Stefan and Laura become models. Meanwhile, Steve is seduced by Nicole, a lovely French girl, whose cohort (Gilbert) is out to steal the teleporter. Part 2: Stefan and Laura participate in a fashion show, while Nicole and Gilbert capture Steve and hold him hostage inside the Paris Opera House, where he is forced to build a new teleporter. Part 3: When Steve finds out he will be killed when the Urk-Pad is finished, Nicole turns for Steve, and Carl rescues Steve. Soon after, Gilbert chases Carl, Nicole, and Steve throughout the city. They split up at the Eiffel Tower and Steve is thrown off by Gilbert, who is arrested by the French police. Down on the ground Carl and Nicole activate the Urk-pad under Steve while he is falling to teleport him to Chicago and save him. After going back to the Winslows' house, Myra tells Steve that it is a dream come true. At the end, Stefan decides to fulfill his career as a model, and stays in Paris.
173	4	"Movin' On"	Richard Correll	Gregory Thomas Garcia & Fred Rubin	October 4, 1996	465304	14.3
Steve finally enrolls in BIT, the Boston Institute of Technology, a fictional prestigious college (a spoof of MIT), which is miles away from Chicago. At first, the Winslows are happy to finally be get rid of the pesky nerd by giving themselves the whole nerd-free days again since Carl is sick and tired of Steve damaging his house and bothering him countless times, but then take pity on him when they learn he is homesick. Meanwhile, Laura (who has recently reached adulthood) moves into an apartment with Myra, but Myra's strange personality makes it hard for Laura to live with her.
174	5	"3J in the House"	Richard Correll	Meg DeLoatch	October 11, 1996	465305	13.2
Orphaned 3J sneaks into the Winslows' attic, afraid that he may be forced to move to another orphanage. Harriette suggests to Carl that they adopt 3J, noting that beneath that sometime smart-mouthed demeanor lies a sweet, innocent young boy who is pining for a family.
175	6	"Getting Buff"	Richard Correll	Stephen Langford	October 18, 1996	465306	14.7
Eddie argues to his girlfriend about her modeling when Steve sees Greta nude in Laura's art class, only for Laura to reveal the shocking truth that Greta's father cut her off financially if she continues dating Eddie, so she chose Eddie over her father's money. Meanwhile, Neidermeyer takes Richie and 3J's football and he refuses to give it back. Nick is soon in for a hard lesson in respecting people's property when he is nearly arrested for trying to break into his own home.
176	7	"Stevil"	Richard Correll	Gregory Thomas Garcia & Fred Rubin	October 25, 1996	465309	15.2
A ventriloquist's dummy, which looks exactly like Steve, comes to life and terrorizes the Winslows, and Steve must stop it.
177	8	"Karate Kids"	Richard Correll	Joseph Cvar & Gary Menteer	November 1, 1996	465307	14.6
A street gang, known as "The Piranhas", has intimidated Richie and 3J from playing at the local park, and when Steve tries to intervene, he is quickly roughed up. The street gang begin celebrating their possible new place to deal drugs and play rap music until Bruce Lee Urkel (and similar Richie and 3J variants) show up to even the score. Meanwhile, after slipping in the Winslows home, Nick fakes needing a wheelchair and threatens to sue Carl. However, his plans are foiled when Harriette and Eddie exploit his scam, via a recording of him running out of the house in a fake fire. After being exposed for his scam, the Winslows send Nick on his way out.
178	9	"Home Again"	Richard Correll	Story by : Stephen Langford & Jaleel White; Teleplay by : Stephen Langford	November 8, 1996	465308	15.4
Steve reunites Stefan and Laura. Meanwhile, Carl and Harriette try to spend time alone but are constantly interrupted by Richie and 3J. New Edition guest stars.
179	10	"Nightmare at Urkel Oaks"	Kelly Sandefur	Gary M. Goodrich	November 15, 1996	465310	15.2
Eddie has a nightmare where he's the reluctant groom to Myrtle Urkel. When Eddie refuses to marry Myrtle, her wealthy father (Reginald VelJohnson in a dual role) steps in and bribes him with $10 million. Greta comes and crashes the wedding. After the nightmare, Eddie tells Steve that he will not marry anyone for money, no matter how much he's bribed. Meanwhile, Harriette tries to get Carl to go on a diet again.
180	11	"Chick-a-Boom"	Joel Zwick	Fred Rubin	November 22, 1996	465311	14.4
Carl once again hopes to impress Police Commissioner Geiss (Dick O'Neill) with a full-course banquet. Myra steps forward and volunteers to cook a stuffed chicken-type dish for dinner. However, things start to get explosive when she mistakes Steve's mini fireworks for pepper, causing the Chickens to blow up after Eddie's band plays "Roll out the Barrel", triggering the explosions. Carl yells at Steve for ruining the dinner, bring him to tears. However, Harriette chastises Carl for holding the dinner only to impress Geiss as well as cutting corners like making the kids work. Meanwhile, 3J encourages Richie to perform a scam to get enough money to go to the movies.
181	12	"The Jury"	Joel Zwick	Gregory Thomas Garcia	December 6, 1996	465312	13.4
Steve and Carl are selected to serve on a jury for a store robbery suspect. Steve is the only one who is convinced that the evidence is not what it seems and proves whose really guilty of robbing the store that leads to the head of security's arrest. Meanwhile, 3J believes he is being sent back to the orphanage, so he begins working in the house and causes problems. Harriette convinces him that when she and Carl adopted him, he'll always have a home with them.
182	13	"It Came Upon a Midnight Clear"	Gregg Heschong	Meg DeLoatch & Gary M. Goodrich	December 13, 1996	465313	14.8
Steve and Carl search for a Christmas tree from within the Wisconsin woods, but wind up getting lost. Carl is annoyed and freezing, but Steve's knowledge of astronomy saves the two from becoming icicles on Christmas. Meanwhile, Laura is caught in a love triangle with Stefan and Curtis and must decide once and for all to whom she is most loyal.
183	14	"Revenge of the Nerd"	Gregg Heschong	Jim Geoghan	January 3, 1997	465314	15.17
Laura is invited to join a sorority and is excited about becoming a member, until she learns that they constantly ridicule Steve (and all nerds for that matter) and plan to crown him "king geek" at their annual "Geek Party". Laura refuses to join the sorority until they change their policy around Steve. Also, after realizing how his feud with Nick Neidermeyer has become a bad influence on the kids, Carl attempts to see how well they can be as friends. This eventually reveals Nick's own jealousy over Carl for having a wonderful family, while he was ditched by his wife. Meanwhile, Steve breaks up with Myra, believing that she's moving their relationship too fast and demanding a marriage. He learns a hard lesson in staying true to his current steady after being tempted with a beautiful woman named Allison (Sanaa Lathan).
184	15	"Love Triangle"	Richard Correll	David W. Duclon & Gary Menteer	January 17, 1997	465316	16.88
With Waldo having broken off his long-standing relationship with Maxine, Laura encourages her heartbroken best friend to begin dating once again. Maxine soon comes home with none other than Curtis, Laura's ex. The two get into a huge pie fight as a result, and Steve, Carl, and Eddie get in it too, but then Stefan and Steve convinces them to compromise. Meanwhile, Carl becomes concerned about Estelle's babysitting habits and tries to get her to compromise. Estelle reminds him of his childhood when his own grandparents spoiled him and his brothers. Carl learns a valuable lesson in respecting her decision when he is reminded that parents have to be firm with their children, but grandparents are allowed to bend the rules and spoil them.
185	16	"Father Time"	Richard Correll	David W. Duclon & Gary Menteer	January 31, 1997	465317	13.45
Steve and Carl use a time transporting device to travel back in time. Despite Steve's warnings not to tamper with the past, Carl leaves a note for himself to make investments in stocks that will skyrocket. When Carl and Steve return to the present, they find out that Carl is the richest man in the world, worth about $247 billion. Although excited at first when he comes inside the penthouse, Carl quickly learns there are consequences in altering the past, especially when he finds out that the Winslows are more miserable than before. He finds out that he has not hugged Estelle in years and Harriette is divorcing him due to his negligence. Carl sees Steve depressed over learning that not only Eddie and Laura have never existed, but also that the Winslows never adopted 3J. After fixing the past, Carl learns a valuable lesson in being the richest man because of his family and not out of money.
186	17	"Beauty and the Beast"	Richard Correll	Meg DeLoatch & Gary M. Goodrich	February 7, 1997	465320	13.88
The ladies (including Myrtle Urkel) enter the 4th Annual Miss Downtown Chicago Beauty Pageant, hosted by Emmanuel Lewis. Cutthroat tactics and all sorts of similar antics ensue, especially by Myrtle to get Eddie's heart.
187	18	"Le Jour d'amour"	Richard Correll	Stephen Langford	February 14, 1997	465321	13.61
Steve hosts three Valentine's Day short stories involving various members of the cast going through the three stages of love. At the end of the episode, he gets his own Valentine's surprise in Myra dressed as Cupid.: 1. First Love: Richie and 3J vie for the affections of the same girl (Kyla Pratt).; 2. True Love: Eddie and Greta run into, Oneisha, one of Eddie's ex-girlfriends from high school. Eddie then performs a love song he wrote for Greta.; 3. Lasting Love: Carl is accused of buying Harriette the same gifts for Valentine's Day as in years past. To make it up, Carl bakes Harriette's favorite chocolate chip cookies, drives cross-country to buy actual flowers and make a homemade Valentine's Day card.
188	19	"What Do You Know?"	Richard Correll	Fred Fox, Jr. & Jim Geoghan	February 28, 1997	465319	14.18
After Steve refuses to attend a game show called "What Do You Know?" in Eddie's place and tells him off to study for the show, he pays Steve back by getting into the transformation chamber to transform Eddie Winslow into Eddie Urkel to gain Steve's smarts to clean up on the show. However, Eddie learns a hard lesson about studying and working hard when Steve shows up as one of his opponents to stop him. Meanwhile, Maxine invites Laura to see Blackstreet & Dr. Dre in concert, but it just so happens to be on the same night that Laura promised Carl that she would spend some time with him. When Carl finds out and with his feelings are hurt, Maxine wisely gives up her ticket so he and Laura can go to see Blackstreet together.
189	20	"Odd Man In"	Joel Zwick	Fred Fox, Jr.	March 14, 1997	465315	14.24
Both father and son have a lesson in appreciation for others. Harriette is invited to participate in Carl's poker night and cleans up. When he refuses to let her play again, he learns a hard lesson in showing appreciation for Harriette. Meanwhile, Steve fills in for Eddie as peanut vendor at Soldier Field (while the latter is at a bikini model shoot), but thanks to the nerd's clumsiness, things go as one would expect. In the aftermath, Eddie loses his job and blames Steve (even going as far as to break off their friendship). When Steve is hurt, Laura is furious and talks with him about it. When Eddie tries to defend himself, she reprimands him for being selfish and points out Steve was nice enough to take time off his own schedule to cover for Eddie. Laura mentions if this is how he will continue behaving and refuse to take responsibility for himself in the loss of his job, then he doesn't deserve Steve as a friend. She ends the argument by mentioning that Steve is better off with having her as a friend because at least she does appreciate him. Eddie realizes his actions was wrong and apologizes for his actions.
190	21	"Flirting With Disaster"	Richard Correll	Story by : Darius McCrary; Teleplay by : Fred Rubin	March 28, 1997	465318	12.57
Steve becomes dismayed after learning he is responsible for Carl's homeowner's insurance skyrocketing (thanks to the nerd's clumsiness), and decides to move out. However, Carl saves the day when he makes his insurance agent (George Wyner) believe that Steve will be his next door neighbor in an apartment complex that he lives in. Meanwhile, Eddie learns that it is best to act your age and remain loyal to your current steady when he falls head over heels in love with an older woman.
191	22	"Pound Foolish"	Jason Bateman	Stephen Langford & Fred Rubin	April 25, 1997	465323	10.71
Steve's Aunt Oona (Donna Summer) returns from Altoona for another visit, this time seeking help in losing weight in order to impress Reverend Fuller (Rif Hutton). It turns out that she had gained a high amount of weight from eating so much at the ham shop she worked at. The nerd suggests his new weight compression chamber, and she loses weight, but soon, Oona regains her weight in an instant. However, when the Reverend visits the Winslow household, he tells Oona that he had liked her just the way she was, admitting his preference for BBWs. Meanwhile, Eddie teaches 3J his methods for getting a girl to notice him.
192	23	"The Brother Who Came to Dinner"	Richard Correll	Reginald VelJohnson	May 2, 1997	465322	10.68
Carl's estranged brother Frank (Ted Lange) comes to visit with a devastating secret: He's in trouble with the law. Even worse, Carl is the one who's assigned to bring him into custody. Carl faces a big moral dilemma as he considers loyalty to his job over fixing a long-broken relationship with his brother whom he's still angry with for not attending their father's funeral. Eventually, he realizes family comes first and decides to help Frank out. Meanwhile, after accidentally breaking Laura's laptop computer, Steve and Eddie try to win $3,000 towards getting a new laptop at the carnival. Steve's latest invention a belt shield, might give Eddie a boost against "Butterball" (Tony Longo). However when his latest invention overheats and Eddie is knocked out, Steve challenges "Butterball" himself and subsequently wins (using the techniques to outwit bullies).
193	24	"A Pirate's Life for Me"	Joel Zwick	Fred Fox, Jr. & Jim Geoghan	May 9, 1997	465324	11.39
Steve gives Carl the opportunity to sail a 1700s vessel through Steve's time travel watch. Unfortunately, the vessel they boarded was owned by pirates. Carl was promoted to captain due to the previous captain's lack of hygiene. However, Steve accidentally drops his time travel watch overboard. Fortunately, Myra (along with Maxine and Laura) comes to the rescue with a copy of Steve's time travel watch. However, the crew turns on Steve and Carl after Carl's rules for the pirates. They all engage in a sword duel and are prompted to walk the plank but escape through the watch at the right time and return home where they are late for dinner.: This was the last episode on ABC, as the show would move to CBS the next season.

=== Season 9 (1997–98) ===
No. overall	No. in season	Title	Directed by	Written by	Original release date	Prod. code	U.S. viewers (millions)
194	1	"Out With the Old"	Joel Zwick	David W. Duclon & Gary Menteer	September 19, 1997	466451	8.40
Steve decides that he needs to give himself a whole new look, somewhat similar to alter ego Stefan Urquelle, in order to win Laura's heart. The makeover comes just in time for Laura's charity auction, where bachelors' kisses are auctioned. Eddie makes $5,000 because of Myrtle's bids. When nobody bids on the nerd, Laura, reluctantly, makes the one and only bid on Steve's kisses. This ending foreshadows the changing relationship between Steve and Laura as Laura seems to enjoy the kiss much more than she expected. Meanwhile, Carl gets upset when he learns Harriette is making more money than him after a promotion, so Carl takes a second job to become the breadwinner again. However, he once again regrets it when he learns that Harriette had been planning a birthday gift surprise.: This was the first episode on CBS, after eight seasons on ABC.
195	2	"They Shoot Ducks, Don't They?"	Joel Zwick	Jim Geoghan	September 26, 1997	466452	8.07
Carl promises to go hunting with Steve but would rather go hunting with Commissioner Geiss. Unbeknownst, Steve meets with them at a small pond. Steve refuses let Carl or Geiss kill the ducks which angers Carl and disappoints Geiss. That is until Geiss sees the ducks escorting their duckings across the pond and realized Steve was right to stop them. Meanwhile, Laura "borrows" her mom's diamond earrings for a night at the Sizzle Club, yet comes home shocked to find out that one of the earrings is missing. Harriette later picks up the missing earring and reprimands Laura for not confessing to using her earrings without permission. When Myra learns that Steve had gotten a makeover against her wishes, she tells him to return to the sexy nerd she loves so much.
196	3	"Dumb Belle of the Ball"	Joel Zwick	Fred Fox, Jr.	October 3, 1997	466453	8.58
Ending up in the hospital after saving Eddie from getting hit by an oncoming car, Myrtle is thrilled when Eddie promises to take her to the Biloxi Debutante Ball, and teaching the others, including Big Daddy, why Myrtle deserves to be there. Meanwhile, Laura upsets Carl when she goes out to the Sizzle Club in a thin, tight dress after promising to change into anything that was less revealing. She soon realizes how much she has hurt Carl after watching an episode of Extra.
197	4	"Drinking and Jiving"	Joel Zwick	Gary M. Goodrich	October 10, 1997	466454	8.68
Laura and Maxine go to a fraternity party and Laura ditches her goody-two-shoes reputation by having her first beer, along with her second and third. Steve arrives to stop this nonsense and gets a drunken Laura home. There, she gives Steve a huge kiss. In the morning, Steve mentions the kiss to Laura, yet she claims that she doesn't remember. When Maxine asks about it, Laura admitted she lied and remembered the kiss. Meanwhile, Carl and Harriette have separate wedding anniversary plans and both tell Eddie about their plans. Then, once they both find out about each other's plans, they start to fight, forcing one of them to reconsider their plans. Eddie wisely tells them to compromise instead of fighting with one another. This leads to Carl hiring a blimp to pronounce his love for Harriette and wishing her a Happy Anniversary while they're on a cruise.
198	5	"Who's Afraid of the Big Black Book?"	Joel Zwick	Stephen Langford & Laura M. Stein	October 17, 1997	466455	9.17
Eddie and Laura play a series of "get even" tricks on each other. Eddie invites Laura's ex, Rick, over on a night she wants to spend with Stefan, who easily gets rid of his tormentor. An angry Laura decides to get even by tricking Steve into inviting Eddie's ex-girlfriends to a surprise birthday party. Infuriated, Steve and Greta sets them straight by making Eddie and Laura realize that their immature tricks are just that. Meanwhile, Carl is upset that Commissioner Geiss promotes his son (Joel Higgins) instead of him, because the younger Geiss is a nice person but not that bright and unable to make decisions. Carl proves to the commissioner his worth when he is able to defuse a potentially deadly gangfight, leading younger Geiss to outright tell his praising father that Carl saved the day and deserves to be promoted to Captain so he can return to his peaceful job in the filing section, and Carl is overjoyed when the commissioner promotes him on the spot. During the end credits, Greta confronts Eddie for keeping a black book containing his ex-girlfriends' names and phone numbers on it and brings a blender filled with water to the kitchen table. She gives him a choice: surrender his black book so they can shred it in pieces or keep it which will likely end their relationship and take his chances with one of them whom will leave him dealing with Myrtle alone. Eddie reluctantly, but wisely chooses Greta and surrenders his black book to the blender.
199	6	"A Mind is a Terrible Thing to Read"	Joel Zwick	Timothy Stack	October 24, 1997	466457	8.18
While testing an invention to improve memory in a school-funded laboratory, Steve gains the ability to read minds, but soon gives up his newfound powers when the Winslows feel their privacy has been invaded (But not before hearing that as of late, Laura has been attracted to him. After giving up his mind reading powers, Steve suffers a brief moment of short term memory loss. Meanwhile, Carl fills in as a Head Scoutmaster to Richie, 3J and their fellow Junior Woodsmen.
200	7	"Stevil II: This Time He's Not Alone"	Richard Correll	Jim Geoghan	October 31, 1997	466456	9.15
The follow-up to last season's Halloween episode "Stevil", an evil ventriloquist dummy that looks just like Steve. In this episode, Carl dreams of Stevil only this time, he is accompanied by Carlsbad, an equally evil dummy that looks like Carl.
201	8	"Trading Places"	John Tracy	Fred Fox, Jr.	November 7, 1997	466458	10.21
Stefan, wondering if Laura had developed some loving feelings for Steve, swaps identities with Steve to find out. Though they are successful, Laura confronts both Steve and Stefan for their behavior and says she doesn't know which one of them is a better choice for their behavior. Meanwhile, Eddie shoots a class-project video about Carl and what he does as an officer for the Chicago Police Department. Though the first video comes off as a failure, Eddie comes up with another video with his community kindly contributing to it.
202	9	"A Pain in Harassment"	Joel Zwick	Beverly D. Hunter & Meg DeLoatch	November 14, 1997	466459	11.69
Harriette and her co-workers get a new boss Mr. Benner (Mark Linn-Baker, Jo Marie Payton's Perfect Strangers co-star) who is cartoonishly cruel and showers the staff with verbal abuse. Soon, she confronts him and tells him unless he treats her and the other co-workers better, she quits. Benner fires her but Carl supports her actions even though they will hurt the family's finances. But she inspires other workers to rise up against Benner and report him to the big boss Mr. Ferguson, leading to Benner's firing and Harriet being hired to a promotion as the store's new VP/Head of Sales. Meanwhile, Steve wins a chance to win $1 million by making a half-court shot during the halftime portion of a Los Angeles Clippers game. Steve does win the $1 million only to lose nearly all of it when he throws the ball up in celebration and inadvertently destroys the scoreboard.
203	10	"Original Gangsta Dawg"	John Tracy	Meg DeLoatch	December 5, 1997	466460	10.13
Cornelius Eugene Urkel aka Original Gangsta Dawg (O.G.D.) (Steve's hip-hop cousin from Detroit, Michigan) has an unwelcome visit to the Winslow household while Steve is away visiting his uncle. His gangster ways and behavior enrages both Carl and Harriette. Little does O.G.D. know is that he'll need the Winslows' help on evading a titanic thug (known as Fresh Squeeze), to whom he owes $4,000. Meanwhile after getting a rude answer from O.G.D, Stefan and Steve conference call O.G.D. to let him know that his behavior is unacceptable and that Steve will be dealing with him tomorrow. Later, Carl has an encounter with Fresh Squeeze and after recognizing him, sneakily escorts the thug to jail.
204	11	"Deck the Malls"	Gary Menteer	Stephen Langford	December 19, 1997	466461	7.49
During the Christmas season, the Winslows and Steve get jobs at the mall. Steve becomes a gift-wrapper with Myra (which frustrates him after being pressured by his customers), Carl becomes a department store Santa Claus and Laura becomes an elf (which too frustrates them because of their dorky styles). Meanwhile, Richie is disappointed finds out that his mom, Rachel, is unable to come home for the holiday. When one kid makes a wish to help his father find a job, Carl as Santa, gives him a business card to give to his father to call of himself. The next morning, the Winslows are confused that Eddie is not home on Christmas morning just to pick up a present. When Eddie arrives, the Winslows learn he drove all night to Detroit to pick up Rachel and light up Richie's spirits.: This is the last episode to feature Estelle Winslow (Rosetta LeNoire), Richie (Bryton James) and Rachel Crawford (Telma Hopkins). This is also the last episode with (Jo Marie Payton) as Harriette Winslow.
205	12	"Grill of My Dreams"	Gary Menteer	Michael Dawson & Ron Geiger	January 9, 1998	466462	8.00
In an effort to decrease his clumsiness, shenanigans and to keep him away from bothering the Winslows too many times, Steve gets a job at Tanaka Gardens (a Japanese restaurant) as a master teppanyaki chef (The owner was played by Pat Morita). His training is put to the test when Laura and Maxine drop by for a visit. Meanwhile, while Commissioner Geiss is away on a second honeymoon, Carl must watch his pet parrot, Andre (voiced by Neil Ross). However, when Andre starts to repeatedly say "Geiss is an idiot," Carl must try to make the parrot stop saying that phrase before Geiss comes home. When Geiss comes home, he explains to Carl that his wife taught Andre to say that line and admits that he thinks Blanche can be a real pain in the butt. It isn't long until Andre starts trouble by repeatedly saying "Blanche is a pain in the butt." and now Geiss must stop the parrot from saying that phrase.
206	13	"Breaking Up Is Hard to Do"	Richard Correll	Gary M. Goodrich	January 16, 1998	466463	8.57
Steve decides to end his relationship with Myra when he becomes aware that Laura is beginning to gain romantic interest on him and the fact that Myra hates his makeover and wanted him to go back to the sexy nerd she loves. He becomes surprised at dinner that she breaks up with him first. However, Steve is unaware that it was just Myra's futile attempt to try to keep the relationship going by trying to get him to renounce his love for Laura. Myra walks in to find Steve and Laura locking lips and attempts to set Steve straight for his betrayal. Steve becomes frightened and Laura engages in an argument with Myra. After Steve breaks it up, he tells her off to leave and never come back. Meanwhile, Carl attempts to set Eddie straight for his mediocre grades. Eddie stays up all night to find a way to fix his grades and he decides to dropout of school to make a clear path to becoming a cop.: Johnnie Cochran made a special appearance as Myra's attorney.
207	14	"Crazy For You"	Richard Correll	Jim Geoghan	January 23, 1998	466464	8.67
Myra begins her attack on Steve and Laura's relationship with the help of her "Stevie-Glasses-Cam" (placed on Steve's glasses unbeknownst to him) and enlists the help of Stefan Urquelle to try to spoil an upcoming Saturday night date. However, Stefan soon feels guilty about the whole thing and stops after realizing how insane Myra really is. Meanwhile, Carl tries to show a trigger-happy Eddie a lesson in good judgment during police training. He uses a cardboard picture of Laura as part of the training and Eddie realizes how his lack of gun control could have negative consequences if he were to accidentally shoot an innocent bystander. Part 1 of 2.: This is the first episode with Judyann Elder replacing Jo Marie Payton as Harriette Winslow.
208	15	"Crazier For You"	Richard Correll	Fred Fox, Jr.	January 30, 1998	466465	8.82
Steve finds out that Myra has been using his glasses to spy on him and knows that she's really "snapped her cap" when she dresses like Laura and interrupts their romantic evening. Despite getting Laura arrested for "stealing her watch", Steve is able to get the charges dropped by exposing Myra's stalking that leads to both her arrest and possible charges. Meanwhile, Harriette finds out that her engagement ring was originally intended for another woman that Carl used to date. Conclusion of a two-parter. Note: This was the last episode to air during the regular 1997-98 Nielsen season; the rest of the episodes had already been filmed and were aired during the summer "burn off" period.
209	16	"Whose Man Is It Anyway?"	Richard Correll	Meg DeLoatch	June 5, 1998	466466	6.38
Myrtle is willing to fight for her man, Eddie, so she decides to challenge Greta to a boxing match at Silver's Gym (the same one that Steve fought Willie Fuffner back in Season 2's Requiem for an Urkel). Meanwhile, 3J begins asking questions about his biological mother, prompting Carl and Harriette to track the woman down. When Carl finds her, she mentions that 3J shouldn't know who she is.
210	17	"Polkapalooza"	Joel Zwick	Stephen Langford & Saundra Stein-Langford	June 12, 1998	466467	5.94
Laura has never been a fan of polka music; she finally decides she has nothing to lose and decides to accompany Steve to a polka jamboree. But instead of being bored and annoyed by the larger-than-life festival-goers, she actually has a great time and finally realizes that, after all these years, Steve may indeed be the guy she was looking for all along. While the two are dancing to some slow, more romantic tunes, she finally tells him "I love you too" after one more of his love "confessions". Meanwhile, Eddie gets a room at an apartment building and even allows Carl to come see him anytime. Little does Eddie know is that he'll regret those words when he tries to have some alone time with Greta. When Carl gets the idea, he apologizes and Eddie decides to compromise in letting him come when he's not with Greta.
211	18	"Throw Urkel from the Train"	Joel Zwick	Michael Dawson & Ron Geiger	June 19, 1998	466468	7.53
Carl fumes about not accepting a promotion five years ago that would have transferred him to Washington, D.C. While boarding a train to travel to the nation's capital for a seminar, luggage boy Steve accidentally stows away. The usual antics result, but the nerd helps Carl realize that "the road not taken" was perhaps the right decision after all. Meanwhile, Laura becomes suspicious about Maxine's new boyfriend D'Andre (Kristoff St. John), especially after he asks her to deliver a package for him and Eddie helps her prove it.
212	19	"Don't Make Me Over"	Joel Zwick	Beverly D. Hunter & Meg DeLoatch	June 26, 1998	466469	5.73
Myrtle, making her last push for Eddie, enlists Laura and Maxine to make her over head to toe. But Eddie, firmly in love with Greta, still is not impressed, so Myrtle decides to pursue someone else, which makes Eddie realize he'll somewhat miss her annoying attempts to win him, and asks her what is he supposed to do now that she's leaving for good. Myrtle replies with a famous movie quote from Gone with the Wind – "Frankly my dear, I don't give a damn". Meanwhile, Carl doesn't want Harriette to worry about his beautiful new masseuse, so he fibs about her appearance, claiming the masseuse is a "big, beefy sistea".
213	20	"Pop Goes the Question"	Joel Zwick	David W. Duclon & Gary Menteer	July 3, 1998	466470	6.81
Carl tells a fellow police officer about the saga that led to Laura's engagement. Both Steve and Stefan propose to Laura. Her past adventures with both the nerd and the one-time "man of her dreams" are replayed through flashbacks (Steve in "Marriage 101," and Stefan in "We're Going to Disney World"). Laura is conflicted between the two, and when Steve feels Stefan is better, he plans to move to Russia to be with his parents, but Laura stops Steve when she realizes she couldn't live without him, and tearfully accepts his marriage proposal, saying that she is sure that he is the one for her, a promise which the two seal with a kiss.
214	21	"Lost in Space"	Joel Zwick	Gary M. Goodrich & Timothy Stack	July 10, 1998	466471	7.1
215	22	"Lost in Space"	Joel Zwick	Gary M. Goodrich & Timothy Stack	July 17, 1998	466472	6.44
Part 1: After NASA buys the patent to one of Steve's inventions, he's sent into space with a pair of astronauts to test it out. However, Steve's invention unintentionally causes a nearby satellite to crash into the space shuttle, and before long he sends himself hurtling through outer space. Meanwhile, Harriette (worried for the well-being of rookie officer Eddie) demands to have him assigned to giving out tickets for parking meter violations. Myra attempts to sneak on the spacecraft to be near Steve but is quickly caught and removed by a space station staff member. Part 2: NASA struggles to recover its astronauts and save Steve's life. However, all ends well, and Steve returns to Earth a national hero. Meanwhile, while on meter duty, Eddie finds himself in the middle of a shootout. Eddie survives thanks to the lucky bullet-proof vest that Carl gave him. During that time, Carl and Eddie help Harriette realize that the job is dangerous and she needs to support them no matter what. Steve sees Laura at the end of the episode and says "You get more beautiful every time I see you." Laura then says she will kiss him only on one condition, Steve will have to promise to "never go into outer space again." Steve replies with "Only when we kiss, Laura Lee, only when we kiss" and they do, much to the delight of the audience, who joyfully cheer in approval.
