= Family Matters =

American television sitcom (1989–1998)

- Genre: Family sitcom
- Created by: William Bickley; Michael Warren
- Developed by: Thomas L. Miller; Robert L. Boyett
- Starring: Reginald VelJohnson; Jo Marie Payton; Rosetta LeNoire; Darius McCrary; Kellie Shanygne Williams; Valerie Jones; Joseph and Julius Wright; Telma Hopkins; Jaimee Foxworth; Bryton McClure; Jaleel White; Shawn Harrison; Michelle Thomas; Orlando Brown; Judyann Elder
- Theme music composer: Jesse Frederick, Bennett Salvay (first five episodes only: Bob Thiele, George David Weiss and George Douglas)
- Opening theme: "As Days Go By," performed by Jesse Frederick (originally in first five episodes only: "What a Wonderful World" by Louis Armstrong) (originally in season 7, episode 8, Talk's Cheap: "A Hard Day's Night" by The Beatles)
- Ending theme: Instrumental theme, composed by Jesse Frederick and Bennett Salvay (seasons 1–4); Gary Boren (seasons 5–9)
- Composers: Jesse Frederick; Bennett Salvay (both; seasons 1-2); Gary Boren (seasons 3–5 and 8-9); Steven Chesne (seasons 4–7 and 9)
- Country of origin: United States
- Original language: English
- No. of seasons: 9
- No. of episodes: 215 (list of episodes)

Production
- Executive producers: Thomas L. Miller; Robert L. Boyett; William Bickley; Michael Warren (seasons 2–9); David W. Duclon (seasons 3–9)
- Producers: Kelly Sandefur; Fred Fox Jr.; Jim Geoghan; Gary Menteer; Stephen Langford; Sara V. Finney; Vida Spears; Rebecca Falk; Robert Blair; Paula A. Roth; James O'Keefe
- Production locations: Lorimar Studios Culver City, California (1989–1991); Sony Pictures Studios Culver City, California (1991–1993); Warner Bros. Studios Burbank, California (1993–1998)
- Camera setup: Film; Multi-camera
- Running time: 24 minutes
- Production companies: Miller-Boyett Productions; Bickley-Warren Productions (1991–1998) (seasons 3–9); Lorimar Television (1989–1993) (seasons 1–4); Warner Bros. Television (1993–1998) (seasons 5–9)

Original release
- Network: ABC
- Release: September 22, 1989 – May 9, 1997
- Network: CBS
- Release: September 19, 1997 – July 17, 1998

Related
- Perfect Strangers; Step by Step; Full House

Family Matters is an American television sitcom that originally aired on ABC for eight seasons from September 22, 1989, to May 9, 1997, then moved to CBS for its ninth and final season from September 19, 1997, to July 17, 1998. A spin-off of Perfect Strangers, the series was created by William Bickley and Michael Warren, and revolves around the Winslow family, a Black middle class family living in Chicago, Illinois. Midway through the first season, the show introduced the Winslows' nerdy neighbor Steve Urkel (Jaleel White), originally as a one-time appearance. However, he quickly became the show's breakout character (and eventually one of the show’s protagonists), joining the main cast.

Running for 215 episodes over nine seasons, Family Matters is the third-longest-running live action American sitcom with a predominantly African-American cast, behind The Jeffersons with 253 episodes over 11 seasons and Tyler Perry's House of Payne with 400 episodes as of 2026. Family Matters was the last live-action scripted primetime show that debuted in the 1980s to end its run; the only scripted shows that started in the 1980s and have lasted longer in continuous production are The Simpsons and The Bold and the Beautiful. (Note: Some non-scripted shows from the 1980s such as America's Funniest Home Videos also lasted longer, while other scripted comedy/drama series such as Roseanne were revived much later after originally ending production. Seinfeld debuted in the same season as Family Matters but aired its final episode two months earlier.)

== History ==
The series was a spinoff from the ABC sitcom Perfect Strangers; both shows aired Friday nights as part of the network's family-oriented "TGIF" lineup. Jo Marie Payton played Harriette Winslow, the elevator operator at a newspaper where Larry Appleton and Balki Bartokomous also worked. Reginald VelJohnson, who was coming off of growing fame from his role in Die Hard, made an appearance on the show as Harriette's husband Carl Winslow, a Chicago police officer. ABC and the producers loved the character Harriette for her great morale and quick-witted humor and decided to create a show that would focus on her and her family, husband Carl, son Eddie, elder daughter Laura, and younger daughter Judy (who appeared until the character was retconned after season four as having not existed).

In the pilot episode, "The Mama Who Came to Dinner", the family had also opened their home to Carl's street-wise mother, Estelle (Rosetta LeNoire), usually known as "Mother Winslow". Prior to the start of the series, Harriette's sister, Rachel Crawford and her infant son, Richie, had moved into the Winslow household after the death of Rachel's husband. The Winslows' nerdy teenage next-door neighbor, Steve Urkel (Jaleel White), was introduced midway through the season in the episode "Laura’s First Date", and quickly became the focus of the show.

The popular sitcom was a mainstay of ABC's TGIF lineup from 1989 until 1997, at which point it became part of the CBS Block Party lineup for its final season. Family Matters was produced by Bickley-Warren Productions (1991–1998) and Miller-Boyett Productions, in association with Lorimar Television (1989–1993) and later Warner Bros. Television (1993–1998). As the show progressed, episodes began to center increasingly on Steve Urkel, and other original characters also played by White, including Steve's suave alter-ego, Stefan Urquelle (who is similar to Jaleel White's real-life self), and his female cousin, Myrtle Urkel.

=== Network change ===
In early 1997, CBS picked up Family Matters and Step by Step in a $40 million deal to acquire the rights to the programs from ABC. ABC then promised to pay Miller-Boyett Productions $1.5 million per episode for a ninth and tenth season of Family Matters. However, tensions had risen between Miller-Boyett Productions and ABC's corporate parent, The Walt Disney Company (which had bought ABC in 1996 as part of its merger with ABC's then-parent Capital Cities/ABC Inc.). Miller-Boyett thought that it would not be a big player on ABC after ABC's recent purchase by Disney.

Miller-Boyett Productions agreed to a $40 million offer from CBS for a 22-episode season for both Family Matters and Step By Step. CBS scheduled Family Matters along with Meego and Step By Step as a part of its new Friday lineup, branded as the CBS Block Party. The network scheduled the family-oriented block against ABC's TGIF lineup, where the two series originated. Jo Marie Payton's contract had just expired and she was reluctant to continue, feeling the show had jumped the shark years prior. She agreed to stay to keep continuity but left midseason shortly after nearly getting into a physical altercation with White in what would be her last regular episode; in that episode, White (playing a gangster instead of his usual Urkel) was attempting to insert material that violated Broadcast Standards and Practices. The resulting dispute between White and Payton escalated to the point where Darius McCrary had to separate the two. Payton would appear in only one more episode after that—a Christmas episode that also brought back several former characters from the ABC run who had been written out on CBS—before Judyann Elder took over as Harriette for the remainder of the season.

While Family Matters continued to lose viewership compared to previous years, it was initially a modest success on CBS, beating the show that replaced it, You Wish. Meego, however, was a ratings failure and was canceled after six weeks. After the holiday special season, CBS replaced Meego with Kids Say the Darndest Things, and with that show's child-centered focus, it was placed in Family Matters' 8/7c time slot. Family Matters was pushed an hour later and paired with Step by Step. The ratings for Family Matters fell even further in this later slot, and the entire block except for Kids Say the Darndest Things was canceled in spring 1998, with the remaining episodes burned off in the summer. The show sporadically aired in 1998, leaving a 5 month gap from January to June.

== Cast ==
Clockwise from bottom-left: Jaleel White as Steve Urkel, Kellie Shanygne Williams as Laura, Michelle Thomas as Myra, Darius McCrary as Eddie, Jo Marie Payton as Harriette and Reginald VelJohnson as Carl

Character	Portrayed by	Seasons								
Character	Portrayed by	1	2	3	4	5	6	7	8	9
Carl Otis Winslow	Reginald VelJohnson	Main	Main	Main	Main	Main	Main	Main	Main	Main
Harriette Baines Winslow	Jo Marie Payton	Main	Main	Main	Main	Main	Main	Main	Main	Main
Harriette Baines Winslow	Judyann Elder									M
Estelle "Mother" Winslow	Rosetta LeNoire	Main	Main	Main	Main	Main	Main	Main	Main	G
Edward "Eddie" Winslow	Darius McCrary	Main	Main	Main	Main	Main	Main	Main	Main	Main
Laura Lee Winslow	Kellie Shanygne Williams	Main	Main	Main	Main	Main	Main	Main	Main	Main
Judith "Judy" Winslow	Valerie Jones	M (Note: In the first season, Valerie Jones was credited as a series regular in only the first episode.)								
Judith "Judy" Winslow	Jaimee Foxworth	Main	Main	Main	Main					
Richard "Richie" Crawford	Joseph & Julius Wright	M								
Richard "Richie" Crawford	Bryton McClure		Main	Main	Main	Main	Main	Main	R	R
Rachel Baines Crawford	Telma Hopkins	Main	Main	Main	Main		R			G
Steven "Steve" Quincy Urkel	Jaleel White	R	Main	Main	Main	Main	Main	Main	Main	Main
Waldo Geraldo Faldo	Shawn Harrison		R	R	Main	Main	Main	Main		
Myra Monkhouse	Michelle Thomas				R	R	Main	Main	Main	Main
Jerry Jamal "3J" Jameson	Orlando Brown							R	Main	Main

== Episodes ==
Season	Episodes	Originally released			Rank	Rating	Viewers (millions)
Season	Episodes	First released	Last released	Network	Rank	Rating	Viewers (millions)
1	22	September 22, 1989	April 27, 1990	ABC	39	13.7	22.2
2	25	September 21, 1990	May 3, 1991	ABC	15	15.8	26.4
3	25	September 20, 1991	May 8, 1992	ABC	27	13.5	21.6
4	24	September 18, 1992	May 14, 1993	ABC	32	12.6	20.8
5	24	September 24, 1993	May 20, 1994	ABC	30	12.6	20.7
6	25	September 23, 1994	May 19, 1995	ABC	34	11.6	18.4
7	24	September 22, 1995	May 17, 1996	ABC	42	10.5	17.0
8	24	September 20, 1996	May 9, 1997	ABC	50	8.8	14.02
9	22	September 19, 1997	July 17, 1998	CBS	99	5.9	8.17

== Production notes ==
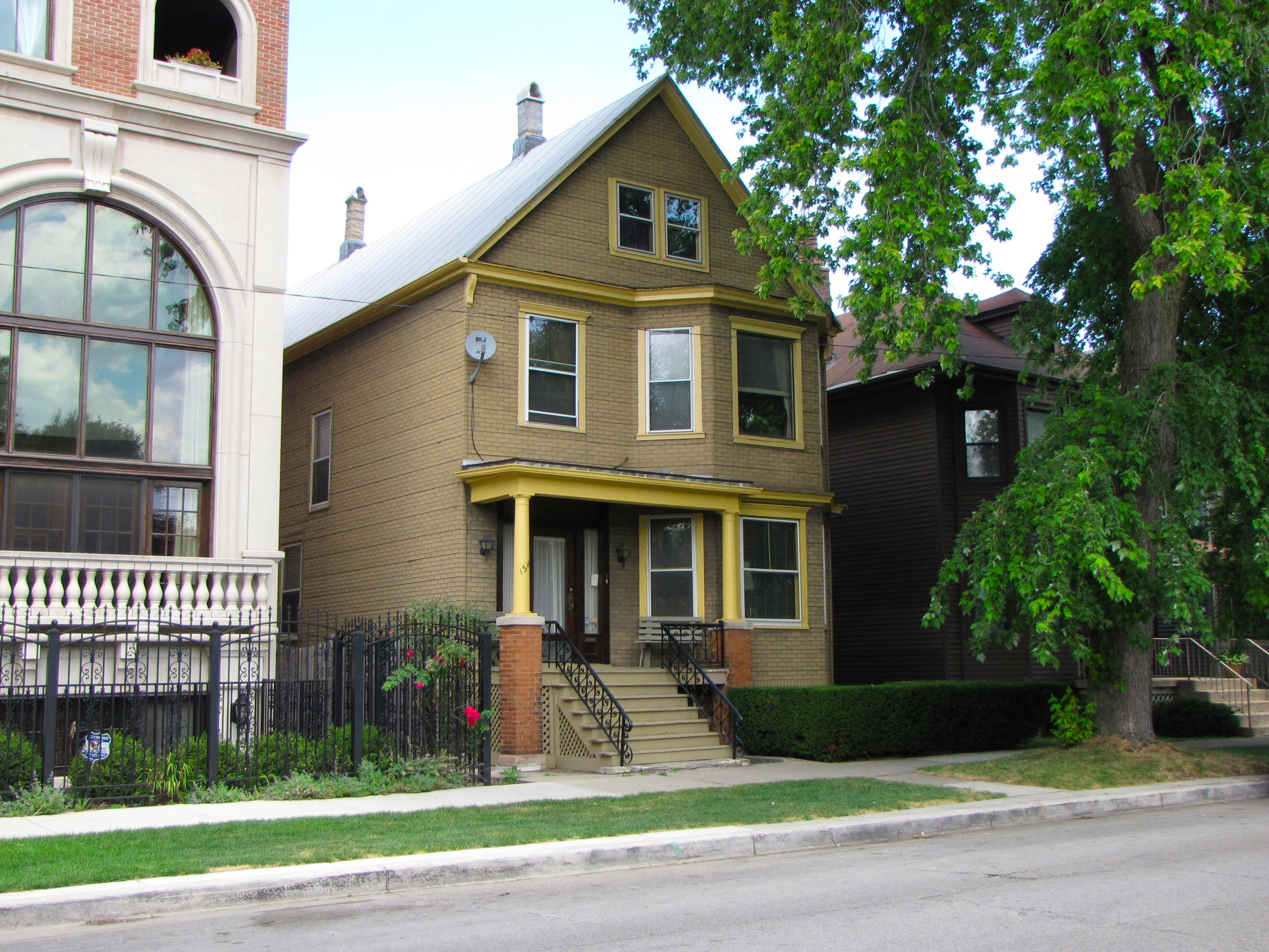
The Family Matters house in Chicago (depicted as the Winslow family home) in 2010. In 2017, the house was demolished and replaced with condos.

Family Matters was created by William Bickley and Michael Warren (who also wrote for, and were producers of, parent series Perfect Strangers) and developed by Thomas L. Miller and Robert L. Boyett (who also served as executive producers on Perfect Strangers); all four also served as executive producers of the series. The series was produced by Miller-Boyett Productions, in association with Lorimar Television, which co-produced the show until 1993, when Warner Bros. Television absorbed Lorimar (a sister company under the co-ownership of Time Warner).

Starting with season three, the series was also produced by Bickley-Warren Productions. The series was filmed in front of a live studio audience; the Lorimar-produced episodes were shot at Lorimar Studios (later Sony Pictures Studios) in Culver City, California, while the Warner Bros.-produced episodes were filmed at Warner Bros. Studios in nearby Burbank.

The show's original theme was Louis Armstrong's "What a Wonderful World"; it was scrapped after the fifth episode of season one ("Straight A's"), though it was heard only in the pilot episode in syndicated reruns. The second theme, "As Days Go By", written by Jesse Frederick, Bennett Salvay and Scott Roeme and performed by Frederick, was the theme for the majority of the series until 1995. The sixth season's opening credits was last used in the season seven episodes "Talk's Cheap" and "Fa La La La Laagghh", the only two episodes during the final three seasons to feature the theme song (this was heard in season one episodes in ABC Family and syndicated airings). A longer version of "As Days Go By" was used during the first three seasons, though in syndicated reruns the short version is heard (in ABC Family airings, the long theme was used for all of the episodes during the first three seasons).

Family Matters is set in the same fictional universe as several other TV shows related to ABC's TGIF or CBS's Block Party. Before Family Matters, Harriette Winslow was originally the elevator operator at the Chicago Chronicle newspaper office in the third and fourth seasons of Perfect Strangers. Family Matters was a spin-off series given to this character in 1989. Characters from Family Matters appeared on other shows, including Full House, Boy Meets World, Step by Step and Meego.

== Syndication ==
In September 1993, Warner Bros. Television Distribution began distributing Family Matters for broadcast in off-network syndication; most television stations stopped carrying the show by around 2002, though some stations in larger markets such as WTOG in Tampa, Florida continued to air Family Matters until as recently as 2005 and New York's WPIX until 2006. In 1995, reruns of the series began airing on TBS Superstation, where it ran until 2003. TBS would air two episodes of Family Matters each weekday afternoon from October 1995 to September 1999. From 1999 to 2003, TBS only aired the series once per weekday typically playing in the early mornings. The series returned to TBS in 2020.

From 1997 to 2003, reruns of the series aired on WGN America. In 2003, ABC Family picked up the series and aired it for five years until February 29, 2008. From 2004 to 2006, UPN aired the show for 2 years. BET aired reruns briefly in December 2009 and began airing the series on a regular basis on March 1, 2013; the series returned to BET in mid-February 2023. MTV2 also began airing reruns on September 7, 2013. The show aired on Nick at Nite from June 29, 2008, to December 31, 2012. ABC Family and Nick at Nite airings cut the tag scenes at the end of all episodes, despite the fact that many episodes during the series have tag scenes during the closing credits. The series also aired on TV One from 2019 to 2023. In Canada, the series also aired on CTV, CBC and currently airs on Family Channel.

On September 29, 2017, Family Matters became available for streaming on Hulu. In the UK it aired on Sky One whilst Perfect Strangers aired on BBC One.

Reruns of the series aired on Cartoon Network's ACME Night block in 2021.

TruTV began airing reruns in 2023 as part of their "Comfort Food" block.

On October 1, 2021, Family Matters began streaming on HBO Max after its streaming rights expired from Hulu, but has since returned to the Hulu platform. The series was removed on HBO Max in September 2025.

As of 2026, BET currently airs reruns on weekend mornings and sporadically on weekday afternoons.

== International airings ==
In France, it aired as La Vie de famille (Family Life) as part of the show Club Dorothée on January 1, 1995, and on RTL9 (from August 28, 1995), France 2 & M6 (from June 1, 2000).

In Germany, it premiered as Alle unter einem Dach (All under one roof) on ProSieben between September 4, 1995 and December 8, 1998.

In Italy, it aired as Otto sotto un tetto (Eight under one roof) on Canale 5, Italia 1 in 1992, with subsequent airings on Fox Retro & Sky Atlantic.

In Croatia, the show aired as Pod istim krovom (Under the Same Roof) starting in September 2005 on RTL, and later on its sister channels RTL 2 and RTL Kockica.

In Spain it was known as "Cosas de Casa" (Home Things), broadcast on Antena 3 during the 90s, and is one of the most remembered dubbings. When Jaleel White participated in the program "Sorpresa Sorpresa" (Surprise Surprise) he praised Pilar Coronado for her way of giving voice to Urkel.

In Israel it was called אריזה משפחתית (Family Packaging) on Arutz HaYeladim.

== Home media ==
Warner Home Video has released the first four seasons of Family Matters on DVD in Region 1 while the remaining five seasons were released by the Warner Archive Collection. On February 4, 2014, Warner Home Video released season 4 on DVD, but consumers complained when it was found that the season 4 set contained syndication edits rather than the original broadcast masters. Warner Bros. responded to the complaints, offered a replacement program to receive corrected discs and reissuing the set with corrected broadcast copies on April 4, 2014. All episodes are the original broadcast form, except for the episode "Number One With a Bullet", disc 1, episode 6. The entire series is also available for digital download on Amazon.com and the iTunes Store, all but season 6 remastered in both SD and HD.

A Complete Series DVD boxset was released on September 26, 2023

DVD Name	Ep #	Release Date	Ref(s)
The Complete 1st Season	22	June 8, 2010	
The Complete 2nd Season	25	February 14, 2012	
The Complete 3rd Season	25	February 12, 2013	
The Complete 4th Season	24	February 4, 2014	
The Complete 5th Season	24	February 16, 2016	
The Complete 6th Season	25	April 12, 2016	
The Complete 7th Season	24	July 26, 2016	
The Complete 8th Season	24	September 20, 2016	
The Complete 9th Season	22	November 8, 2016	
The Complete Series	215	September 26, 2023	

== Related media and spin-offs ==
=== Urkel Saves Santa: The Movie! ===
On September 1, 2021, it was announced an animated Christmas film Urkel Saves Santa: The Movie! (originally Did I Do That to the Holidays? A Steve Urkel Story) was planned to air on Cartoon Network as part of the block ACME Night in 2022. It was set to be released on HBO Max. However, on August 22, 2022, it was announced the film would not be moving forward on HBO Max and would be shopped elsewhere as a result of the Warner Bros. Discovery merger. Warner Bros. Discovery instead released the film on digital on November 21, 2023.

=== Scooby Doo and Guess Who? ===
When Urkel-Bots Go Bad!

Jaleel White returned to voice Steve Urkel in the 2019 episode "When Urkel-Bots Go Bad!" of the animated series Scooby-Doo and Guess Who?. This appearance marked the first time White had officially performed the character in a television production since the conclusion of Family Matters in 1998. In the episode, the Mystery Inc. gang travels to Chicago and encounters Urkel, who has designed a high-tech robot intended to assist with chores. The plot involves a "Techno-Ghost" taking control of the Urkel-Bot and causing chaos throughout the city during a science exhibition. The gang eventually unmasks a jealous rival scientist, clearing Steve's name and stopping the malfunctioning invention.

=== Unproduced reboot ===
In 2016, following the success of Fuller House, Jaleel White was approached about a reboot of Family Matters for Netflix involving Steve Urkel and Laura Winslow raising their son, Steve Jr. He rejected the idea and instead pitched a single-camera series inspired by his experiences growing up while starring on the show, but the idea was also rejected.

== Accolades ==
Association	Year (Note: Indicates the year of ceremony. Each year is linked to the article about the awards held that year, wherever possible.)	Category	Nominee(s) / Work	Result	Ref(s)
Broadcast Music, Inc (BMI) Film & TV Awards	1991	BMI TV Music Award	Bennett Salvay	Won	
Broadcast Music, Inc (BMI) Film & TV Awards	1992	BMI TV Music Award	Bennett Salvay	Won	
NAACP Image Awards	1994	Outstanding Youth Actor/Actress	Jaleel White	Won	
NAACP Image Awards	1995	Outstanding Youth Actor/Actress	Jaleel White	Won	
NAACP Image Awards	1996	Outstanding Lead Actor in a Comedy Series	Jaleel White	Nominated	
NAACP Image Awards	1997	Outstanding Lead Actor in a Comedy Series	Jaleel White	Won	
Nickelodeon Kids' Choice Awards	1996	Favorite Television Show	Family Matters	Nominated	
Nickelodeon Kids' Choice Awards	1996	Favorite Television Actor	Jaleel White	Nominated	
Primetime Emmy Awards	1996	Outstanding Individual Achievement in Special Visual Effects	Kelly Sandefur (For episode "Send in the Clone")	Nominated	
TV Land Icon Awards	2008	Favorite Character(s) Who "Went Missing"	Jaimee Foxworth	Nominated	
Young Artist Awards	1990	Best Young Actor Starring in a Television Series	Darius McCrary	Nominated	
Young Artist Awards	1990	Best New Television Series	Family Matters	Nominated	
Young Artist Awards	1990	Best Young Actor Guest Starring in a Television Series	Randy Josselyn	Won	
Young Artist Awards	1991	Best Young Actress Supporting or Re-Occurring Role For a TV Series	Jaimee Foxworth	Nominated	
Young Artist Awards	1991	Best Young Actress Starring in a Television Series	Kellie Shanygne Williams	Nominated	
Young Artist Awards	1991	Best Young Actor Starring in a Television Series	Darius McCrary	Nominated	
Young Artist Awards	1991	Outstanding Young Comedian in a Television Series	Jaleel White	Won	
Young Artist Awards	1992	Outstanding Young Comedienne in a Television Series	Kellie Shanygne Williams	Nominated	
Young Artist Awards	1993	Outstanding Young Comedienne in a Television Series	Kellie Shanygne Williams	Nominated	
Young Artist Awards	1993	Outstanding Young Comedian in a Television Series	Darius McCrary	Nominated	
Young Artist Awards	1993	Best Young Actress Recurring in a Television Series	Cherie Johnson	Nominated	
Young Artist Awards	1993	Best Young Actor Recurring in a Television Series	Patrick J. Dancy	Nominated	
Young Artist Awards	1993	Best Young Actor Co-starring in a Television Series	Shawn Harrison	Nominated	
Young Artist Awards	1993	Best Young Actor Recurring in a Television Series	Bumper Robinson (Tied with Aeryk Egan for Brooklyn Bridge)	Won	
