= Ralph Farquhar =

American screenwriter and producer

Ralph R. Farquhar
- Born: September 19, 1951 (age 75); Chicago, Illinois, U.S.
- Education: University of Illinois Urbana-Champaign (BA)
- Occupations: Film and television producer, writer
- Years active: 1981–present
- Spouse: Melba Katzman Farquhar
- Children: Regan Farquhar (son)
- Relatives: Kurt Farquhar (brother)

Ralph Farquhar (born September 19, 1951) is an American film and television producer and screenwriter.

== Biography ==
Farquhar attended the United States Military Academy at West Point before receiving a Bachelor of Arts degree in communications from the University of Illinois.

He is the co-creator of three sitcoms set in South Central, Los Angeles, California: the Fox sitcom South Central, and, with Sara Finney-Johnson and Vida Spears, the UPN sitcoms Moesha, starring Brandy, and its spinoff The Parkers, starring Countess Vaughn and Mo'Nique.

His writing credits include Happy Days, Fame, and Married... with Children. He has also served as an executive producer on The Sinbad Show, The Proud Family, and Real Husbands of Hollywood, and was the screenwriter of the 1985 film Krush Groove, starring Run-DMC.

In 2020, he signed an overall deal with Disney.

== Personal life ==
His younger brother is Kurt Farquhar, a composer for film and television who has written themes and scores for several of the elder Farquhar's shows. His son is rapper and producer Regan Farquhar, best known under the stage name Busdriver.
