= The Parkers =

American television sitcom (1999–2004)

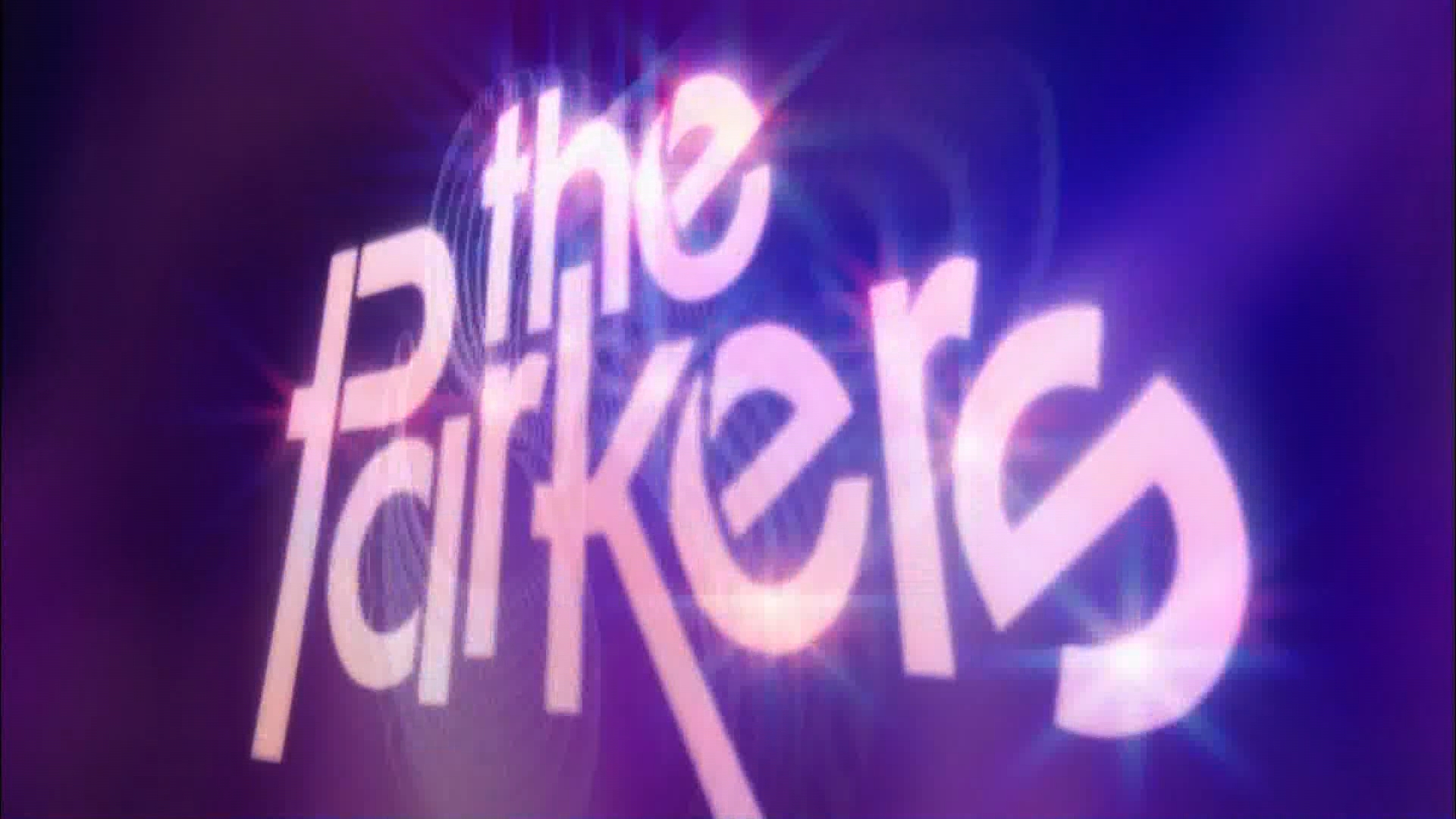
- Genre: Sitcom
- Created by: Ralph Farquhar; Sara V. Finney; Vida Spears
- Starring: Mo'Nique; Countess Vaughn; Mari Morrow; Dorien Wilson; Jenna von Oÿ; Ken L.; Yvette Wilson
- Theme music composer: Rodney Jerkins; Countess Vaughn
- Opening theme: "We're the Parkers" performed by Countess Vaughn
- Ending theme: "We're the Parkers" (instrumental)
- Composer: Kurt Farquhar
- Country of origin: United States
- Original language: English
- No. of seasons: 5
- No. of episodes: 110 (list of episodes)

Production
- Executive producers: Bill Boulware; Ralph Farquhar; Sara V. Finney; Vida Spears; Andrea Wiley
- Producers: Andrea Allen; Michelle Listenbee Brown; Gary M. Goodrich; Stacey Evans Morgan; Stephen K. Rose; Andrea Wiley; Mo'Nique
- Running time: 22–24 minutes
- Production companies: Saradipity Productions; Regan Jon Productions; Big Ticket Television

Original release
- Network: UPN
- Release: August 30, 1999 – May 10, 2004

Related
- Moesha

The Parkers is an American television sitcom created by Ralph Farquhar, Sara V. Finney and Vida Spears. The series ran for five seasons from August 30, 1999, to May 10, 2004, on UPN as a spin-off to Moesha. It stars Mo'Nique, Countess Vaughn, Mari Morrow, Dorien Wilson, Jenna von Oÿ, Ken L. and Yvette Wilson. The show centers on the relationship between a mother and daughter, Nikki and Kim Parker, who reside outside of Los Angeles in Santa Monica, California, with both attending Santa Monica College. The series was produced by Big Ticket Television, in association with Saradipity Productions and Regan Jon Productions, with Bill Boulware, Ralph Farquhar, Sara V. Finney, Vida Spears and Andrea Wiley serving as executive producers. 110 episodes were produced.

== Premise ==
This comedy series centers around a mother and daughter who both attend Santa Monica College. Nikki Parker was forced to drop out of high school, nearly 20 years earlier, when she discovered she was pregnant. As the time arrived for her daughter to go to college, Nikki decided to go as well as a way to get an experience and education that was taken from her so many years earlier. Through a series of hilarious situations, Nikki has to adjust to the fact that her daughter is growing up, while Kim realizes that Nikki has a lot more going on in her life beyond being a mother.

== Cast and characters ==
=== Main ===
Actor	Character	Seasons				
Actor	Character	1	2	3	4	5
Countess Vaughn	Kimberly Ann "Kim" Parker	Main	Main	Main	Main	Main
Mo'Nique	Nicole "Nikki" Parker	Main	Main	Main	Main	Main
Dorien Wilson	Professor Stanley Oglevee	Main	Main	Main	Main	Main
Mari Morrow	Desiree Littlejohn	Main (Note: Mari Morrow only starred in the main cast for episodes 1-4, 10, and 11.)				
Jenna von Oÿ	Stevie Van Lowe	Main (Note: Jenna von Oÿ, Ken Lawson & Yvette Wilson officially join the main cast at the beginning of episode 14. All three had previously starred in recurring roles on the show.)	Main	Main	Main	Main
Ken L.	Thaddeus "T" Radcliffe	Main	Main	Main	Main	Main
Yvette Wilson	Andell Wilkerson	Main	Main	Main	Main	Main

- Countess Vaughn as Kim Parker, a ditzy college student and Nikki's daughter. Although she can be shallow, Kim has a kind heart and is close with Nikki. Kim is also a lead singer in the music group Free Style Unity, which also includes Stevie and T. At the end of the series, she fails out of Santa Monica College but becomes a successful fashion designer.

The Parkers main characters of Season 1A: (l-r) Nikki Parker, Desiree Littlejohn, Kim Parker and Professor Oglevee (center)

- Mo'Nique as Nikki Parker, a boisterous, confident single mother, who embraces college life to the fullest. She is in love with Professor Oglevee, despite his apparent hatred of her. In the series finale, she eventually wins him over after five years of chasing him and they get married.
- Mari Morrow as Desiree Littlejohn, the Parkers' neighbor and Nikki's friend. She only appears in the first season and is uncredited as a regular after six episodes. She is not seen after episode 13. It was stated that creator, Ralph Farquhar, wrote her off because he wanted a stronger dynamic with another one of his characters. She was replaced by Yvette Wilson.
- Dorien Wilson as Professor Stanley Oglevee, a handsome professor at Santa Monica College. Although he prides himself on his intelligence, he often becomes embroiled in hare-brained schemes, often due to his own foolishness.
- Jenna von Oÿ as Stevie Alison Van Lowe, a sarcastic, intelligent white college student as well as Kim's best friend. Stevie is from an affluent family and has a tempestuous relationship with her mother. She is also a member of the music group Free Style Unity, alongside Kim and T. Upon graduating from Santa Monica College, Stevie attends UCLA and goes into business with Kim.
- Ken L. as Thaddeus Tyrell "T" Radcliffe, a flirtatious, attractive college student as well as friend to Kim and Stevie. He is also a member of the music group Free Style Unity. At the end of the series, T goes on to attend Berklee College of Music.

The Parkers main characters of Seasons 1B–5 with Jenna von Oÿ and Ken Lawson becoming regulars and the addition of Yvette Wilson (replacing Mari Morrow) joining the cast: (l-r) Professor Oglevee, Thaddeus "T" Radcliffe (back row), Andell Wilkerson, Nikki Parker, Kim Parker and Stevie Van Lowe (front row)

- Yvette Wilson as Andell Wilkerson, Nikki's level-headed best friend. Andell originated as a regular character on Moesha and appears on The Parkers in a recurring role during the first season; she became a main character in the middle of Season 1. From Season 3 onward, she is the owner of a restaurant called Andell's. At the end of the series, she marries her boyfriend, Lester.

=== Recurring ===
- Thomas Mikal Ford as Mel Parker, Nikki's rich ex-husband and Kim's father
- Porscha Coleman as Erica Willis
- Kara Brock as Regina Foster, a snobbish and stuck-up colleague of Nikki, Kim, and Stevie's at Santa Monica College and also a member of the Triple-A Sorority
- Dwight Woody as Joe Woody, a worker in the cafeteria at Santa Monica College. Woody previously played Coach Vines on Moesha.
- Paulette Braxton as Veronica Cooper, the on-and-off girlfriend of Professor Oglevee and Nikki's nemesis
- Shannon Tweed as Sophia Van Lowe, Stevie's mother
- Kym Whitley as Gertrude "Gertie" Lowe, the organ player at Mount Zion, where Nikki is the choir director. She has known Nikki and Andell since high school.
- Kel Mitchell as Frederick "Freddy" Jones, a flamboyant fashion design student who often has a conflict with Kim
- Lamont Bentley as Hakeem Campbell, Kim's longtime friend and former crush
- Shar Jackson as Niecy Jackson, Kim's best friend
- Samantha Becker as Symone (season 1), a backup singer in the group Free Style Unity
- Lark Voorhies as Chandra Carrington, a colleague of Nikki and Kim's at Santa Monica College and also a member the Triple A Sorority
- Trent Cameron as Jerel Goodrich, Kim's boyfriend turned fiancé
- Earl Billings and Aloma Wright as George and Shirley West/Alexander, Nikki's adoptive parents
- Suzzanne Douglas as Constance McFarland, Nikki's haughty older sister
- Cherie Johnson as Tiffany McFarland, Nikki's niece
- George Wallace as Quincy DeJohn, Nikki's biological father
- Veronica Redd as Camille Oglevee, Professor Oglevee's mother
- Nancy Wilson as Aunt Rita, Nikki's aunt, who turned out to be her biological mother
- Isabel Sanford as Evelyn "Nana" Smith, Nikki's grandmother

== Episodes ==
Season	Episodes	Originally released		Viewers (millions)
Season	Episodes	First released	Last released	Viewers (millions)
1	22	August 30, 1999	May 22, 2000	2.7
2	22	September 4, 2000	May 14, 2001	3.7
3	22	September 10, 2001	May 20, 2002	4.4
4	25	September 23, 2002	May 19, 2003	3.73
5	19	September 15, 2003	May 10, 2004	3.33

== Broadcast ==
=== Syndication ===
The Parkers has aired in syndication on BET, Centric (previously BET J), Fuse, UP, TV One, VH1, and MTV2.

Currently, the series airs reruns on Cleo TV and Dabl.

The series started streaming on Netflix on October 1, 2020.

=== International airings ===
In Europe, the show has aired in Ireland and the UK. In Ireland, it aired on RTÉ Two from 2000 to 2005, usually airing Thursdays at 7.00 pm. The first four seasons were aired in this evening time slot, with season five beginning in this timeslot and with the few remaining episodes moved to a late-night timeslot on Fridays. After the series finished on RTÉ Two, there have been no re-runs and no current plans to run the show again. It was also shown on UK channel Trouble, which was also available in Ireland. It usually aired weekdays from 2000 to 2004 but after it was completely removed, it was shown on a one-off weekend in late 2006, with episodes airing all day. In Australia, it aired on Fox8 and in Jamaica on TVJ.

== Reception ==
=== Critical response ===
Although The Parkers premiered to mixed reviews and was criticized for its outrageous characters, the series was a ratings success for UPN. Its debut season ranked as the number one comedy on the network; it was the most popular show among black audiences, ahead of The WB’s The Steve Harvey Show. The success of the series has been credited to its ability to relate to many audiences, especially young people.

=== Ratings ===
Season	Timeslot (EDT)	Season premiere	Season finale	TV season	Rank	Viewers (in millions)	Ref
1	Monday 8:30 pm	August 30, 1999	May 22, 2000	1999–2000	127	2.60	
2	Monday 8:30 pm	September 4, 2000	May 14, 2001	2000–01	129	2.30	
3	Monday 9:00 pm	September 10, 2001	May 20, 2002	2001–02	126	4.26	
4	Monday 8:00 pm	September 23, 2002	May 19, 2003	2002–03	153	3.73	
5	Monday 8:00 pm	September 15, 2003	May 10, 2004	2003–04	177	3.33	

The Parkers series finale aired on May 10, 2004, and drew in 3.6 million viewers.

=== Awards and nominations ===
Year	Award	Result	Category	Recipient
2001	NAACP Image Awards	Nominated	Outstanding Comedy Series	-
2001	NAACP Image Awards	Won	Outstanding Actress in a Comedy Series	Mo'Nique
2002	NAACP Image Awards	Nominated	Outstanding Supporting Actress in a Comedy Series	Yvette Wilson
2002	NAACP Image Awards	Nominated	Outstanding Supporting Actor in a Comedy Series	Dorien Wilson
2002	NAACP Image Awards	Won	Outstanding Actress in a Comedy Series	Mo'Nique
2003	NAACP Image Awards	Nominated	Outstanding Comedy Series	-
2003	NAACP Image Awards	Nominated	Outstanding Actress in a Comedy Series	Mo'Nique
2004	NAACP Image Awards	Won	Outstanding Supporting Actor in a Comedy Series	Dorien Wilson
2004	NAACP Image Awards	Won	Outstanding Actress in a Comedy Series	Mo'Nique, Countess Vaughn
2005	NAACP Image Awards	Nominated	Outstanding Supporting Actor in a Comedy Series	Dorien Wilson
2005	NAACP Image Awards	Nominated	Outstanding Actress in a Comedy Series	Mo'Nique
2003	Young Artist Award	Nominated	Best Performance in a TV Comedy Series – Guest Starring Young Actor	Christopher Massey
2004	BET Comedy Awards	Nominated	Outstanding Writing for a Comedy Series	-
2004	BET Comedy Awards	Nominated	Outstanding Supporting Actor in a Comedy Series	Dorien Wilson
2004	BET Comedy Awards	Nominated	Outstanding Lead Actress in a Comedy Series	Mo'Nique, Countess Vaughn
2004	BET Comedy Awards	Nominated	Outstanding Directing for a Comedy Series	-
2004	BET Comedy Awards	Nominated	Outstanding Comedy Series	-

=== Reunion ===
The cast of The Parkers on The Mo'Nique Show: (l-r) Ken Lawson, Dorien Wilson (back row), Jenna von Oÿ, Mo'Nique and Countess Vaughn (front row)

In 2009, cast members Countess Vaughn, Jenna von Oÿ, Ken Lawson, and Dorien Wilson appeared on The Mo'Nique Show for a full-length episode, "The Parkers Reunion." Series creator Sara V. Finney was part of the audience for the episode. Yvette Wilson didn't appear due to her busy work schedule.

=== Home media ===
The Parkers: The Complete Collection, containing all five seasons, was released on region 1 DVD in Canada via Visual Entertainment in a 14-disc set on 18 March 2016.
