= Vida Spears =

American television producer and writer (born 1956)

- Born: April 8, 1956 (age 68); Baldwin, Nassau County, New York, U.S.
- Occupation(s): Television producer, writer
- Years active: 1984–present

Vida Spears (born April 8, 1956) is an American television producer and writer. She is best known as the co-creator, with Ralph Farquhar and Sara Finney-Johnson, of the UPN sitcoms Moesha, starring Brandy, and The Parkers, starring Countess Vaughn and Mo'Nique.

Before Moesha, Spears and Finney-Johnson had been a long-term writing team, the first African-American female writing team in the television industry. A native of Baldwin, New York and a graduate of Michigan State University, Spears also served as a member of the Board of Directors for the Writers Guild of America.

Her other credits as a writer include The Jeffersons, Married... with Children, 227, and The Parent 'Hood. Along with Finney-Johnson, she served as a writer and story editor on The Facts of Life and Family Matters, where they also later served as producers.

Spears and Finney-Johnson departed Family Matters in 1996 to create Moesha with Ralph Farquhar, where they served as showrunners. When Moesha series regular Countess Vaughn was spun off into her own series, The Parkers, Spears remained with Moesha while Finney was in charge of The Parkers. Following an alleged dispute with Brandy and her manager, her mother Sonya Norwood, Spears was dismissed from Moesha in 2001 and joined Farquhar and Finney-Johnson on The Parkers instead.
