= Sara Finney-Johnson =

American writer and producer

- Born: Sara Vernetta Finney; January 25, 1957 (age 69); Mobile, Alabama, U.S.
- Occupations: Television producer, writer
- Years active: 1984–present
- Spouse(s): Robert Lee Johnson, Jr. (m. 2002; died 2014)

Sara Vernetta Finney-Johnson (born January 25, 1957) is an American television producer, writer, and playwright. She is best known as the co-creator, with Ralph Farquhar and Vida Spears, of the UPN sitcoms Moesha, starring Brandy, and The Parkers, starring Countess Vaughn and Mo'Nique.

Before Moesha, Finney-Johnson and Spears had been a long-term writing team, the first African-American female writing team in the television industry. Her other credits as a writer include The Jeffersons, 227, and The Parent 'Hood. Along with Spears, she served as a writer and story editor on The Facts of Life and Family Matters, where they also later served as producers.

Born in Mobile, Alabama and raised in Los Angeles, California, Finney-Johnson is a graduate of the University of Southern California. In addition to her work in television, Finney-Johnson also works in theater as a playwright and producer. With Erwin Washington, she founded the Los Angeles Black Playwrights group in 1986.

Finney was married to Robert Lee Johnson, Jr., a financial broker and artist; he died in 2014.
