= Gary Menteer =

American actor, director, producer and screenwriter

- Born: Gary Wayne Menteer; November 21, 1939; Houston, Texas, U.S.
- Died: January 18, 2016 (aged 76); Rancho Mirage, California, U.S.
- Occupations: Actor, director, producer, screenwriter
- Years active: 1957–2003
- Spouse: Joseph Cvar

Gary Wayne Menteer (November 21, 1939 – January 18, 2016) was an American actor, director, producer and screenwriter. With David W. Duclon, he was the creator of the short-lived American sitcom television series Boys Will Be Boys.

== Career ==
In the 1960s to 1980s, Menteer appeared in television variety shows and films including Bye Bye Birdie, Westinghouse Desilu Playhouse, The Carol Burnett Show, Finian's Rainbow and Hello, Dolly!.

Menteer was nominated for Primetime Emmy awards in 1985 and 1986 in the category Outstanding Children's Program for his work as producer on Punky Brewster.

In 1987, Menteer created the new FOX sitcom television series Boys Will Be Boys with David W. Duclon.

== Death ==
Menteer died in January 2016 in Rancho Mirage, California, at the age of 76. He was survived by his husband Joseph Cvar.
