= Boyett =

Boyett is an English surname which was brought to England after the Norman Conquest. Notable people with the surname include:

- John Boyett (born 1989), American football player
- Lon Boyett (born 1953), American football player
- Steve Boyett, writer and disc jockey based in Northern California
- Theodore Boyett (1912–1987), American football coach in the United States
- William Boyett (1927–2004), American actor

== See also ==
- Miller-Boyett Productions, American television production company that developed sitcoms from the 1970s through the 1990s
