= Jesse Frederick =

American composer and singer

- Born: Jesse Frederick James Conaway; June 25, 1948 (age 78); Salisbury, Maryland, U.S.
- Occupations: Musician, composer, singer, songwriter
- Years active: 1971–present
- Musical career
- Genres: Soundtrack; Film score; Classic rock; Pop
- Instruments: Vocals; bass

Jesse Frederick James Conaway (born June 25, 1948) is an American film and television composer and singer. He wrote and performed the themes to TGIF television shows such as Full House, Family Matters, and Step by Step for ABC.

== Early years ==
Jesse Frederick James Conaway was born in Salisbury, Maryland, but was raised in Seaford, Delaware. He was the younger of two children. His brother, Everett Thomas “Tommy” Conaway, Jr. (1944–1956), died of cystic fibrosis at age 12 years. In his early childhood, Jesse was familiarly known as "Freddy" before he started using the middle name Frederick in his later teens. This was done in an attempt to distinguish himself from the legacy of his father, Everett T. "Conny" Conaway, Sr. (1915–2010). Conny was a prominent figure in the poultry processing industry. During his 70-year career, the senior Conaway designed and built some of the earliest processing plants for Allen Family Foods, Frank Perdue and Preston Townsend, all of which are still operating today. In early adolescence, Frederick attended Massanutten Military Academy for two years. Once he entered high school, his father put him to work, hoping to groom a protege in the industry. Frederick learned about the processing of poultry first hand as a plant laborer at many of his father's factories on the East Coast.

In high school, Frederick starred in many school plays and although his primary musical instrument was classical trumpet, he demonstrated mastery of a variety of musical instruments. He graduated Seaford High School in 1966, before attending Shenandoah College and Conservatory Of Music. Under his father's tutelage, he studied mechanical drafting, and eventually worked as his apprentice in plant overhead conveyor layout designs, but continued writing and composing his own work.

== Career ==
=== Late 1960s to mid 1970s: music career and Bearsville Records and early EPs ===
Although he released some early single records in the Philadelphia area in his late teens, and recorded demos for Columbia Records while in college, it was in 1971, at the age of 23, Jesse was signed to Albert Grossman's Bearsville Records.

His self-titled debut album, recorded in Nashville and mixed in part by Todd Rundgren, was released in that year. Although the album gained Frederick a lot of respect from his peers, its sales success was limited. In 1973, Bearsville released a promo 45 featuring both stereo and mono versions of the first single from Frederick's second album, After the Rain, which would never be released. The single was entitled "I Belong to You". As the 1970s progressed, Frederick would sign with another label, spawning a third album in the process; as in the last project at Bearsville, it never saw the light of day.

In a partnership with producer Jeff Koz (who had worked with Frederick on The Last Horror Film in 1982 and Treasure: In Search of the Golden Horse in 1984), Frederick formed the band The Kinetix and released the single, "Don't Stand In The Shadow" for Columbia Records, in 1984.

=== Late 1970s to early 1980s: film composing and acting in film on stage ===
By the late 1970s, Frederick had changed his beat to movie and TV score composing.

In 1980, he performed vocals for the character "Tommy Dee" (played by Paul Land) in the Taylor Hackford film The Idolmaker. A single from the picture's soundtrack, "Here Is My Love", was released in both stereo and mono formats. That same year, Frederick played Alice Cooper's roadie in the film Roadie. Also that year he performed in Goosebumps a rock musical stage show directed and choreographed by David Winters. It co-starred Carl Anderson, and Shabba Doo.

In 1982, Frederick reunited with director Winters and composed the score for his motion picture The Fanatic (aka The Last Horror Film). Many more major theatrical titles would follow, including that of Garry Marshall's 1984 hit The Flamingo Kid.

=== Mid to late 1980s: foray into TV: Bennett Salvay and Miller/Boyett ===
In the mid-1980s, as a result of his movie scoring work, Frederick began a partnership with writer/composer, (Paul) Bennett Salvay. The two musicians had both come off Garry Marshall-produced projects at the time they began working together. Frederick had just completed his scoring for The Flamingo Kid, while Salvay had been music director in the later seasons of the hit series, Happy Days, Laverne & Shirley and Mork & Mindy, for Garry Marshall's Henderson Productions, Miller-Milkis-Boyett Productions and Paramount Television. The pair found they had a dynamic spark of creativity between them, and sought out work on original compositions that would be pitched to TV and movie projects. As Frederick worked on new musical material with him, Salvay would eventually lead them to new opportunities with his TV employers.

When producers, Thomas L. Miller and Robert L. Boyett, left Paramount for Lorimar Productions in 1984, they retained many of their former Paramount staffers, including Salvay and, initially, music composer, Charles Fox. Miller and Boyett quickly set out to develop new projects at Lorimar (minus their former Paramount partner, Edward K. Milkis), and in the process of keeping Salvay on their soundtrack staff, noticed his work with Frederick and commissioned the both of them to be songwriters for their projects, working separately from Fox. In 1985, Miller and Boyett assigned the pair to their new comedy project for ABC, which was titled, The Greenhorn, in its early stages. Although it was too early to predict at the time, Frederick and Salvay had just embarked on what would become a long-running alliance with Miller-Boyett Productions.

=== Perfect Strangers ===
When ABC slated the new Miller/Boyett project to premiere on Tuesdays in March 1986, following some cast changes, it went into official production under the new title, Perfect Strangers. Frederick and Salvay penned their first TV title track, "Nothing's Gonna Stop Me Now", for the series, which obliquely told the ballad of the show's two leads—Balki Bartokomous (Bronson Pinchot) and Larry Appleton (Mark Linn-Baker)—as the former had dreams of making it in America from the island of Mypos, while the latter had aspirations to make it in Chicago, after moving from Wisconsin. Perfect Strangers went on to become a hit, running eight seasons on ABC, and made Frederick and Salvay's songwriting weekly staples in millions of households across the country. While the lyrics were written by Frederick and Salvay, "Nothing's Gonna Stop Me Now" was sung by David Pomeranz.

=== Valerie/Valerie's Family ===
Beginning in the 1986-87 season, Frederick and Salvay were asked to score selected episodes of NBC's Miller/Boyett-produced sitcom Valerie, which had premiered in March 1986, three weeks before the debut of Perfect Strangers on ABC. Charles Fox handled composing on Valerie for the show's first two seasons (in fact, it was the only Miller/Boyett series from the Lorimar era to use Fox), with Bruce Miller taking over regular scoring from seasons three through six. Frederick and Salvay scored three episodes: one which aired in November 1986, another in April 1987 (which they co-scored with Steven Chesne) and a third in the spring of 1988, after the series had been retitled Valerie's Family.

=== Full House ===
In 1987, Frederick and Salvay wrote their second title track for Miller-Boyett, "Everywhere You Look", for the new ABC fall sitcom Full House. This theme had a more love-of-the-family-centric subject in its lyrics, but was in line with their work on other Miller/Boyett shows due to its catchiness and upbeat nature. Full House initially struggled in the ratings, but when ABC scheduled it on Tuesdays in addition to its regular Friday slot for a time in 1988, it began a gradual increase in audience size. The series became popular in its second season. It then served as the anchor of ABC's new TGIF lineup in 1989, where Frederick and Salvay's work were about to be heavily showcased. Full House cracked the Nielsen top 30 in its third season and the top 20 in its fourth. Well before it reached its peak in seasons five to seven (where it shot to the top 5), "Everywhere You Look", in its various edits, had become a highly referenced and celebrated song among young viewers. The hook that most heavily caught fans' delight was the opening line, which pondered, "Whatever happened to predictability? The milkman, the paperboy, evening TV?"

By this point, it was recognized that the strength in Frederick and his partner's work was found in their knack for lyric-heavy, uplifting compositions. There was a common theme between most: that of realizing one's dreams, and making a success out of one's life. It was these ingredients that touched a generation of young viewers especially. Frederick and Salvay's underscores for Full House, which were more sentimental and instrument-heavy than on earlier hit Perfect Strangers, became the signature sound the two are also most recognized for.

There is much speculation that Frederick inspired the creation of one of the series' main characters. When Full House was in early development in 1986 (under the working title House of Comics), the role eventually given to star John Stamos was that of Adam Cochran, one of three comedians sharing a house in San Francisco. Once the format was revised and the original pilot set to shoot, Stamos's character became Jesse Cochran (later renamed Jesse Katsopolis as a nod to Stamos's Greek ethnicity), the super-cool rock musician brother-in-law of Danny Tanner (played in the unaired pilot by John Posey, before Bob Saget became available for the role). Fitting in with the character's new image, it is believed that naming him "Jesse" and turning him into a rocker was inspired by the real-life persona of Frederick. However, series creator Jeff Franklin has stated that when the character was being renamed, he was reminded of Elvis Presley's twin brother Jesse, who had died at a young age.

In 2015, "Everywhere You Look" was re-recorded with Carly Rae Jepsen on vocals for Full House's Netflix sequel series, Fuller House.

=== Family Matters ===
Joining ABC's established Miller/Boyett shows on the newly developed TGIF in September 1989 was Family Matters, a spin-off from Perfect Strangers. Frederick and Salvay scored the scenes and the closing theme alone during the series' first few episodes. During the first five ABC broadcasts, the title track was a shortened version of Louis Armstrong's "What A Wonderful World". The closing theme that Frederick and Salvay wrote and recorded was a melody loosely based on "What A Wonderful World", featuring a more uptempo beat dominated by saxophone and culminating in an orchestral crescendo.

By the sixth episode of Family Matters, Miller and Boyett, along with show creators William Bickley and Michael Warren, decided that they wanted a more sitcom-esque opening theme for the show. Frederick and Salvay wrote an original title track featuring a jazzy, ragtime piano prologue leading into an upbeat melody, again using high orchestration. Titled "As Days Go By", it was sung by Frederick with a back-up chorus of male singers. Family Matters was only a moderate success until Jaleel White's Steve Urkel was added in early 1990, becoming the show's breakout character. "As Days Go By" remained as the Family Matters theme in various forms until the beginning of the show's seventh season. It wasn't until the start of the series' fifth season in 1993 that Frederick and Salvay composed a closing version of "As Days Go By"; it was a hip-hop sounding rendition with a saxophone domination. The melody was slightly altered so that it didn't closely match the notes of the opening version.

=== 1990s success ===
In 1990, the works of Frederick and Salvay received dramatically increased air time in the US. Perfect Strangers went into rerun syndication that fall. As a result, their music was being played on a five-days-a-week basis. Further, Miller/Boyett had just acquired a complete programming stake in ABC's hit TGIF lineup, having four of their comedies air back-to-back. Full House, Family Matters and Perfect Strangers were joined by freshman series Going Places. Frederick and Salvay composed all music for Going Places, but for the first time since Perfect Strangers, had another singer, Mark Lennon, perform the theme. Over at CBS, Miller/Boyett's other new series The Family Man was airing on Saturday nights alongside the producers' NBC series The Hogan Family (the former Valerie and Valerie's Family), which had switched networks. The Hogan Family was the only Miller/Boyett series from the Lorimar era to have not utilized Frederick and Salvay for most of its run, aside from the selected episodes they scored in 1986-88. The two worked on The Family Man, which boasted a first for both the musical team and Miller/Boyett; it was the first series in the group to have an instrumental opening theme.

Programs that ensued for the duo included Step by Step in 1991. The latter's title track, "Second Time Around", was sung by Frederick in a duet with Teresa James. It illustrated the story of the show's newly married couple, Frank Lambert (Patrick Duffy) and Carol Foster (Suzanne Somers), as they had visions of mixing their households of kids together. Step By Step was another TGIF hit, running six seasons on ABC and its seventh and final on CBS. From 1992 to 1994, Frederick and Salvay's newest project with Miller/Boyett was at first titled A New Day in its earliest development. Following a revamp in its creation (by Bickley/Warren), it premiered on TGIF in March 1993 as Getting By. The series had two different theme songs during each of its two seasons, the second of which aired on NBC. The first theme that Frederick and Salvay wrote was sentimental in nature with woodwind instrumentation, and sung by Mark Lennon. The second theme had the funk/hip-hop sound that had started to be heard on sister shows such as Family Matters, and had a different male vocalist. In 1994, the two worked on Miller/Boyett's single-season comedy On Our Own. It starred Ralph Louis Harris and the six Smollett siblings as a family learning to fend for themselves after the death of their parents. The series' theme, one in a long line of feel-good, inspirational tunes from Frederick and Salvay, was performed by Joe Turano.

In the later years of their run with Miller/Boyett, Frederick and Salvay would alternate score composing duties with other resident talents such as Steven Chesne and Gary Boren. On some series, such as Perfect Strangers in its last few seasons, the two were replaced entirely (in this case, by Boren). After the conclusion of Full House and cancelation of On Our Own, both in 1995, Frederick and Salvay continued work on most remaining Miller/Boyett shows. However, there would be no new projects from the producers until 1997, when Miller and Boyett developed the new CBS comedy Meego, Bronson Pinchot's third series with the production company (earlier in 1997, Pinchot had been a series regular on Step by Step). Meego, which aired on the network's new "Block Party" lineup (a TGIF clone), was a departure from the usual production and musical styles of both Miller/Boyett and Frederick and Salvay. The sentimental, upbeat rock-flavored scores from earlier shows were substituted by pieces with strictly orchestral sounds, which seem most fitting for a show about an alien who crashed-landed on Earth, and who was now living with an American family (headed by Ed Begley, Jr.) in the series. After only a month on the air, Meego was canceled due to disappointing ratings.

Frederick and Salvay continued working for their longtime employers, even as their parent production companies went through further changes in the late 1990s. In 1997, Michael Warren began the transition of splitting away professionally from William Bickley. The former teamed up with Miller and Boyett, forming Miller-Boyett-Warren Productions, initially to produce Meego. Bickley-Warren Productions remained active for one more season (1997–98) to produce the final season of Family Matters and Step by Step, which both were cancelled by CBS (the network both series had moved to that season) in 1998. Miller-Boyett-Warren had a new project for ABC in the works for that fall, which would end up being the final TV series project for Frederick and Salvay, as well as for the producers. That September, Two of a Kind, starring Mary-Kate and Ashley Olsen, premiered. Frederick and Salvay wrote their shortest opening title track to date for this series; however, Two of a Kind's instrumental theme was a return to the acoustic guitar-dominated, upbeat tunes that the two were known for, especially on the Olsens' former series, Full House. Two of a Kind, despite favorable reviews, folded in the spring of 1999 after one season.

=== Return to television scoring ===
In 2015, Full House creator Jeff Franklin, along with Miller and Boyett, were all underway in launching the long-rumored revival series to Full House, entitled Fuller House. It marked the first time since the late 1990s that Jeff Franklin Productions and Miller-Boyett Productions were active in TV series producing, and ultimately, that Frederick and Salvay were working on music compositions for episodic television. As Fuller House moved into production, the producers were successful in courting Frederick and Salvay back to compose the score and theme music for the show; the pair oversaw all music arrangement for the entire 13-episode first season, which premiered on Netflix on February 26, 2016. While Frederick and Salvay worked on the incidental scene change music together, they formed a partnership with singer Carly Rae Jepsen and songwriter/producer Butch Walker to remix "Everywhere You Look" in new vocal and instrumental forms, those of which would serve as the opening and closing themes to Fuller House. Jepsen performed the opening vocals to "Everywhere You Look", and the official commercial release of the song features never-before released verses that Frederick, Salvay and Jeff Franklin wrote for the track back in 1987, but of which were never included in broadcasts of Full House.

=== Parody ===
Frederick was also hired by The Tonight Show Starring Jimmy Fallon to compose, record and perform an original song for the show's parody of themes for various TGIF shows, such as Family Matters and Full House. His music accompanied a cold open parodying said show's intros, and starred Fallon, Steve Higgins, and The Roots. Frederick performed the song live on The Tonight Show Starring Jimmy Fallon with help from Fallon & The Roots. With Adam Silver, Jesse wrote and performed a second parody song for the 2018 NBA Draft entitled "Play By Play." https://www.youtube.com/watch?v=Ni-XHx4UmhI

== Work with other TV producers ==
During his years co-writing with Bennett Salvay, Frederick occasionally received work with other TV producers. In 1986, he and Salvay wrote the theme song to the short-lived CBS sitcom Better Days, a Lorimar series from producers Jeff Freilich, Stuart Sheslow and Arthur Silver. The Better Days title track has the distinction of being the first TV theme written by the two that Frederick performed vocals on (predating his performance of "Everywhere You Look" on Full House). Later, they wrote a more saccharine-tinged theme for the just-as-short-lived spring 1988 ABC comedy Family Man (no relation to the similarly titled Miller-Boyett series of two years later), which Frederick also performed.

Also in 1988, due to their primary employment on sitcoms produced by Lorimar, Frederick and Salvay scored selected episodes of CBS' Falcon Crest, a dramatic Lorimar production.

In 1992, Frederick and Salvay were asked by Full House creator Jeff Franklin to handle scoring duties, with Gary Boren, on his new ABC sitcom Hangin' With Mr. Cooper. The series was produced by Franklin and Lorimar Television (later Warner Bros. Television from seasons two through five), but not by Miller-Boyett Productions during any point in its run. Frederick and Salvay handled scene scoring during the first season only. Over a year after their departure, Bickley-Warren Productions became a co-producer of Cooper.

== Personal life ==
He is married to his wife, Holly. Together, they have two sons, Kieran and Nikolas.
