= Rich Correll =

American actor (born 1948)

- Born: Richard Thomas Correll; May 14, 1948 (age 78); Los Angeles County, California, U.S.
- Other name: Richard T. Correll
- Education: University of Southern California
- Occupations: Actor; director; producer; writer
- Years active: 1960–present
- Spouse: Beth Correll

Richard Thomas Correll (born May 14, 1948) is an American film and television actor, director, writer, and producer. After working as an actor during his childhood and teenage years, he transitioned to directing in the 1990s, and he has gone on to direct episodes for series such as The Amanda Show, That's So Raven, The Suite Life of Zack & Cody, Hannah Montana, Cory in the House, The Suite Life on Deck, I'm in the Band, How to Rock, A.N.T. Farm, Jessie, Austin & Ally, Liv and Maddie, K.C. Undercover, Bunk'd, and Raven's Home. Correll also co-created Hannah Montana, alongside Michael Poryes and Barry O'Brien.

== Early life ==
Born in Los Angeles County, California, Correll is the son of Charles Correll, who starred as Andy Brown on the radio program Amos 'n' Andy. He is the brother of Barbara Correll, Dottie Correll and Charles Correll Jr., who worked on Animal House as cinematographer and directed episodes of Without a Trace; CSI: Miami; CSI: Crime Scene Investigation; Beverly Hills, 90210; Melrose Place and Stargate SG-1.

== Career ==
As a child actor, Correll played the role of Beaver's friend Richard Rickover during the last three seasons of Leave It to Beaver (1960–63). He also appeared in multiple episodes of The Adventures of Ozzie and Harriet, Lassie and National Velvet. As a teenager, Correll became a close friend of legendary silent film comedian Harold Lloyd and his family, and volunteered to assist Lloyd in preserving and archiving Lloyd's extensive films while he was an undergraduate at the University of Southern California. He is credited as the chief archivist for the Lloyd Trust and has shared his encyclopedic knowledge of Lloyd's work and life in interviews and commentary tracks for the 2005 DVD release of Lloyd's films, and in the 1991 documentary The Third Genius.

In 1983, as a result of a revival of the Leave It to Beaver series on television and film, Correll appeared on the Match Game-Hollywood Squares Hour as a game show participant / celebrity guest star.

Correll made his film directorial debut with Ski Patrol.

Correll has directed episodes of The Suite Life on Deck; The Suite Life of Zack & Cody; Family Matters; What I Like About You; That's So Raven; So Little Time; The Amanda Show; The Hogan Family; Yes, Dear; Two of a Kind; Fuller House and many other series. He is also the co-creator of the Disney Channel original series, Hannah Montana.

In 2018, Correll celebrated the completion of his 700th TV directing assignment and that, coupled with the 9 years of producing under the Garry Marshall - Miller/Boyett banner, brought his TV episodic totals to over 1000 episodes.

== Personal life ==
Correll owns an extensive collection of science-fiction, fantasy, and horror film artifacts, which are shown at his Icons of Darkness exhibit in Hollywood. A noted fan of The Beatles, he was hired to choreograph the climatic sequence of the 1978 film I Wanna Hold Your Hand that recreates the February 1964 performance of the Beatles on the Ed Sullivan Show (specifically the look-alike actors playing the group).

=== Quiet on Set revelations ===
In March 2024, the docuseries Quiet on Set: The Dark Side of Kids TV revealed that Corell and his wife Beth were among the industry figures who had written letters of support requesting leniency for dialogue coach Brian Peck during his 2004 sentencing for the sexual abuse of a minor. Following the revelation, the couple issued a public apology to the victim Drake Bell, stating regret and that they had written the letters based on misinformation at the time. The couple worked prior with the victim and the perpetrator on The Amanda Show.

=== Litigation ===
In 2010, Correll and co-creator Barry O'Brien sued Disney for unfair termination and alleged non-payment of creative royalties for Hannah Montana. The multi-year legal battle ultimately concluded when a California appellate court refused to overturn an arbitration award favoring Disney, ruling that the creators failed to establish substantial prejudice regarding excluded financial evidence.

== Filmography ==
=== Actor ===
- The DuPont Show with June Allyson (1 episode, 1960)
- The Dick Powell Show (1 episode-1961)
- The Danny Thomas Show (2 episodes- 1960)
- Leave It to Beaver (39 episodes, 1960–1962)
- The Adventures of Ozzie and Harriet (3 episodes,1960-1961)
- The Blue Angels (1 episode- 1961)
- The Betty Hutton Show (3 episodes-1959-1960)
- Bonanza (1 episode, 1961)
- Lassie (5 episodes, 1961–1964)
- National Velvet (3 episodes, 1961–1962)
- The Many Loves of Dobie Gillis (1 episode, 1962)
- Still the Beaver (Television film, 1984)
- The New Leave It to Beaver (4 episodes, 1984)
- Family Matters (2 episodes,1996-1997)
- The Suite Life of Zack & Cody (2007, 2 episodes)

=== Producer ===
- Police Squad! (6 episodes, 1982)
- Bosom Buddies (Pilot, 1980)
- The Hogan Family (51 episodes, 1986–1989)
- Full House (Pilot, 1987)
- Step by Step (71 episodes, 1991–1995)
- Mostly Ghostly: Have You Met My Ghoulfriend? (2014) (executive producer)

=== Writer ===
- Happy Days (5 episodes- 1982)
- Hannah Montana (98 episodes, 2006–2011)
- Mostly Ghostly: Who Let the Ghosts Out? (2008)
- Hannah Montana: The Movie (2009)
- Mostly Ghostly: Have You Met My Ghoulfriend? (2014)

=== Director ===
- Ski Patrol (1990)
- The Hogan Family (1987–1990, 46 episodes)
- Going Places (7 episodes, 1990–1991)
- The Family Man (18 episodes, 1990)
- Perfect Strangers (14 episodes, 1990)
- Scorch (Pilot, 1992)
- Full House (14 episodes, 1987–1992)
- Getting By (Unknown episodes, 1993)
- Sister, Sister (Pilot-1994)
- On Our Own (13 episodes, 1994)
- Step by Step (Pilot-1991)
- Step by Step (56 episodes, 1991–1995)
- Kirk (12 episodes, 1995)
- Brotherly Love (1 episode, 1997)
- Life with Roger (16 episodes, 1996)
- Girls Across the Lake (unknown episodes, 1997)
- Married... with Children (1 episode, 1997)
- Meego (12 episodes, 1997)
- Family Matters (91 episodes, 1989–1998)
- Holding the Baby (12 episodes, 1998)
- Two of a Kind (14 of the 22 episodes, 1998–1999)
- Scorch (Pilot - 1998)
- Guys Like Us (12 episodes, 1998)
- The Norm Show (1 episode, 1999)
- Grown Ups (17 episodes, 1999)
- The Amanda Show (16 episodes, 2000–2001)
- Hype (13 Episodes 2000–2001)
- Yes, Dear (3 episodes, 2000–2001)
- So Little Time (12 episodes, 2001–2002)
- Reba (1 episode, 2002)
- All That (17 episodes, 2003)
- That's So Raven (52 episodes, 2003–2006)
- What I Like About You (2 episodes, 2004)
- The Suite Life of Zack & Cody (58 episodes, 2005–2008)
- Arwin! (Unsold Disney Channel pilot, 2007)
- Hannah Montana (34 episodes, 2007–2008)
- Cory in the House (13 episodes, 2007–2008)
- The Suite Life on Deck (36 episodes, 2008)
- Mostly Ghostly (2008)
- I'm in the Band (4 episodes, 2010)
- Are We There Yet? (4 episodes, 2011)
- How to Rock (3 episodes, 2011)
- A.N.T. Farm (28 episodes, 2012)
- See Dad Run (9 episodes, 2012–2014)
- Jessie (32 episodes, 2012–2015)
- Liv and Maddie (3 episodes, 2014)
- Partners (6 episodes, 2014)
- Austin & Ally (2 episodes, 2014)
- Mighty Med (6 episodes, 2014–2015)
- K.C. Undercover (2 episodes, 2015)
- Lab Rats (1 episode, 2015)
- Bunk'd (11 episodes, 2015–2017)
- Fuller House (34 episodes, 2016–2020)
- Raven's Home (5 episodes, 2019–2020)
- The Girl Who Believes in Miracles (2021)
