= Frank Coombs =

Frank Coombs may refer to:

- Frank Coombs (politician) (1853–1934), United States representative from California
- Frank Coombs (American football), American football coach
- Frank Coombs (footballer) (1925–1998), professional footballer
- Frank Coombs (artist) (1906–1941), English painter, architect and art dealer
