= Bosom Buddies =

American sitcom (1980–1982)

- Genre: Sitcom
- Created by: Chris Thompson; Thomas L. Miller; Robert L. Boyett
- Starring: Tom Hanks; Peter Scolari; Donna Dixon; Holland Taylor; Telma Hopkins; Wendie Jo Sperber; Lucille Benson (1980–1981)
- Theme music composer: Billy Joel
- Opening theme: "My Life" by Billy Joel (original airings); "Shake Me Loose" by Stephanie Mills (syndicated airings)
- Ending theme: "Shake Me Loose" (instrumental)
- Composers: Dan Foliart; Howard Pearl
- Country of origin: United States
- Original language: English
- No. of seasons: 2
- No. of episodes: 37

Production
- Executive producers: Chris Thompson; Thomas L. Miller; Robert L. Boyett; Edward K. Milkis
- Producers: Jeff Franklin; Don Van Atta
- Editors: Kris Trexler; Kelly Sandefur
- Camera setup: Multi-camera
- Running time: 25 minutes
- Production companies: Miller-Milkis-Boyett Productions; Paramount Television

Original release
- Network: ABC
- Release: November 27, 1980 – March 27, 1982

Bosom Buddies is an American television sitcom starring Tom Hanks and Peter Scolari created by Robert L. Boyett, Thomas L. Miller and Chris Thompson. It aired on Thursday nights for two seasons on ABC from November 27, 1980, to March 27, 1982. The show features the misadventures of two single men, working in creative advertising, struggling in their industry while disguising themselves as women in order to live in the one apartment they could afford. Gender stereotypes and male-female interpersonal relationships were frequent themes.

The show became known for its quirky humor and its frequent use of improvisation, especially between stars Hanks and Scolari. Though the show started out with good ratings, it failed to hold the public's interest and was canceled after two seasons.

The show is now best known for launching the career of Hanks, who became an Oscar-winning film star.

== Premise ==
Henry: When we first moved to New York, we had a great apartment that was dirt cheap.

Kip: And we found out why it was so cheap!

Henry: Our friend Amy said there was a great apartment in her building...

Kip: Dirt cheap! But it's a hotel for women. ...Okay, we made one adjustment.

Henry: Now these other ladies know us as Buffy and Hildegarde.

Kip: But they also know us as Kip and Henry, Buffy and Hildy's brothers.

Kip: ...I am crazy about the blonde.

Henry: This experience is gonna make a great book.

Kip: See? It's all perfectly normal!

— opening narration

In the pilot episode, after their own apartment is demolished while they are still asleep in it, two men disguise themselves as women in order to live in the dirt-cheap Susan B. Anthony Hotel, which happens to be female-only. Kip Wilson is originally skeptical of the plan, but after meeting gorgeous resident model/dancer/nurse Sonny Lumet, he ends up convincing aspiring writer Henry Desmond that the experience will make a great book. Their co-worker, Amy Cassidy, who is attracted to Henry, is the only resident in on the plan. The boys' deception includes outwitting the hotel manager, Darlene, and fellow resident, Isabelle Hammond, an aspiring singer. When the pilot sold to ABC, the character of Darlene was replaced by Lilly Sinclair.

In the first season, Kip, Henry, and Amy work for Ruth Dunbar at the Manhattan-based advertising firm of Livingston, Gentry & Mishkin, where Kip is a graphic artist, Henry is a copy writer, and Amy is the receptionist. Ruth often takes credit for the boys’ work when reporting to her (unseen) boss, Mr. Rubinowitz.

The show was barely renewed for a second season. In order to improve the mediocre ratings of the first season, revise the format, and at the same time, do some cost-cutting, it was decided that the part of Lilly Sinclair was superfluous and was written out. As a result, veteran actress Lucille Benson left the series and Telma Hopkins' character of Isabelle became the new hotel manager. Kip, Henry and Amy left Livingston, Gentry & Mishkin to start their own advertising firm, Sixty Seconds Street, with Ruth serving as a not-quite-silent partner.

In the first episode of the second season, the male characters’ ruse of living in drag is revealed, but they are allowed to continue living at the women-only hotel anyway. Sonny forgives Kip for the deception, and Isabelle, the new hotel manager, agrees to go along with the ruse rather than admit it to the other residents. From this point on, the drag element was de-emphasized and the show moved closer to the creators' original concept of a regular buddy comedy.

== Cast ==
- Tom Hanks as Kip Amos Wilson / Buffy Wilson
- Peter Scolari as Henry Desmond / Hildegard Desmond
- Wendie Jo Sperber as Amy Cassidy, co-worker and friend who knows their secret
- Holland Taylor as Ruth Dunbar, their boss
- Donna Dixon as Sonny Lumet, Kip's love interest and hotel resident
- Telma Hopkins as Isabelle Hammond, hotel resident; hotel manager in season 2
- Lucille Benson as Lilly Sinclair, hotel manager (season 1)

== Production ==
The series was conceived by Miller and Boyett as a male counterpart to their hit sitcom Laverne & Shirley. They originally pitched it as a straightforward buddy comedy done in what they described as "a sophisticated Billy Wilder kind of way." When ABC executives asked Miller and Boyett to explain what they meant by the comparison to Wilder, the producers mentioned Some Like It Hot (directed by Wilder) and ABC bought the show on condition that it would include men in women's clothing, just like that movie. "We weren't there to pitch that," Miller recalled. "And they jumped on it! We drove back to the studio in the car saying, 'Oh my God, what are we gonna do? We have to do something in drag.'"

After the cast had been chosen, Miller and Boyett asked Chris Thompson, one of the writer-producers of Laverne & Shirley, to write the pilot and be the series showrunner. Thompson (who would go on to executive-produce such shows as The Larry Sanders Show) said later that he took the job purely for the money, but unexpectedly found it to be "my completely favorite experience in show business", because the network left him and his young cast free to experiment. "We were left alone," he recalled. "Nobody was paying attention to us. We were all really young, but it was like we had daddy's Porsche. We had $500,000 to play with every week."

Although the series is set in New York, Bosom Buddies was taped on Stage 25 at Paramount Studios in Los Angeles. Stage 25 was also the home of The Lucy Show, Cheers, and its spin-off Frasier.

Like many other sitcoms that aired during the 1980–81 television season, Bosom Buddies felt the effects of a strike by the Screen Actors Guild and American Federation of Television and Radio Artists that occurred in 1980. As a result, the show had an abbreviated first season. At first, its ratings were strong. However, ABC kept switching the show's day and time slots, which hurt the first season's overall standing. The second season, with its revised premise, fared even worse, and after more time slot changes by the network, the show was canceled in the spring of 1982. Ironically, the last line of the series (season 2, episode 18 "Not the Last Picture Show") was, "You know, no matter how old I get now, I'll never get tired of watching this."

Bosom Buddies was one of the last shows to use the Miller-Milkis-Boyett production team due to Eddie Milkis leaving the company in 1984. This was also one of the last Miller-Boyett sitcoms to be produced by Paramount Television (now CBS Television Studios) before they moved their base of operations to Lorimar Productions (later Warner Bros. Television); Happy Days ended its run in 1984, making the latter the last program to meet cancellation before the Miller-Boyett move to Lorimar, with Valerie being the first since to debut.

== Episodes ==
While the pilot episode was shot on film, the rest of the series was shot on videotape.

Bosom Buddies series overview
| Season | Episodes | Originally released | |
| Season | Episodes | First released | Last released |
|---|---|---|---|
| 1 | 19 | November 27, 1980 | April 30, 1981 |
| 2 | 18 | October 8, 1981 | March 25, 1982 |

=== Season 1 (1980–81) ===
| No. overall | No. in season | Title | Directed by | Written by | Original release date |
|---|---|---|---|---|---|
| 1 | 1 | "Pilot" | Joel Zwick | Chris Thompson | November 27, 1980 |
Kip and Henry dress up as "Buffy" and "Hildy" so they can live at an all-female hotel.
| 2 | 2 | "My Brother, My Sister, Myself" | Chris Thompson & Don Van Atta | Chris Thompson | December 4, 1980 |
Kip violates hotel rules by being in Hildy's room after hours.
| 3 | 3 | "Loathe Thy Neighbor" | Herbert Kenwith | Howard Gewirtz & Ian Praiser | December 11, 1980 |
After a quarrel with her roommate Amy, Sonny moves in with Buffy and Hildy.
| 4 | 4 | "Macho Man" | Chris Thompson & Don Van Atta | Lenny Ripps | December 18, 1980 |
Tired of being seen by women as a sensitive guy, Henry tries to prove that he can be tough and manly.
| 5 | 5 | "What Price Glory?" | John Bowab | Roger Garrett | January 1, 1981 |
Kip and Henry must let go of their moral scruples to get a big advertising account for their agency.
| 6 | 6 | "Kip and Sonny's Date" | John Bowab | Chris Thompson | January 8, 1981 |
Kip goes on his first date with Sonny, while Henry dates Ruth's punkish niece.
| 7 | 7 | "Beauty and the Beasts" | Will Mackenzie | Howard Gewirtz & Ian Praiser | January 15, 1981 |
After experiencing life as an unattractive woman, Henry realizes that he himself has been shallow in only dating women for their looks.
| 8 | 8 | "Revenge" | John Tracy | Lenny Ripps | January 22, 1981 |
All of Amy's friends work together to pull an elaborate sting on a man who dumped her.
| 9 | 9 | "Amy's Career" | John Tracy | David Chambers & Jack Carrerow | January 29, 1981 |
Amy gets her big break when she's put in charge of a major advertising campaign.
| 10 | 10 | "Gotta Dance" | Will Mackenzie | David Lerner & Bruce Ferber | February 5, 1981 |
Kip casts Sonny in a singing and dancing commercial for the public library.
| 11 | 11 | "Sonny Boy" | Chris Thompson & Don Van Atta | Lenny Ripps | February 12, 1981 |
Buffy and Hildy are shown on TV after foiling a robbery, and Henry's mom recognizes Hildy as her son.
| 12 | 12 | "How Great Thou Art" | Will Mackenzie | David Lerner & Bruce Ferber | February 19, 1981 |
Henry arranges for Kip to have an exhibition of his paintings, but the critics don't like them.
| 13 | 13 | "Kip Quits" | John Bowab | Chris Thompson | February 26, 1981 |
Kip quits his job rather than change a campaign to please a client. Bruce Vilanch has a bit part in this episode.
| 14 | 14 | "Only the Lonely" | Tom Trbovich | David Chambers & Jack Carrerow | March 12, 1981 |
Ruth invites Kip and Henry over to her apartment for an awkward evening of games and calypso music.
| 15 | 15 | "The Re-Write" | Will Mackenzie | Story by : Chris Thompson; Teleplay by : Howard Gewirtz & Ian Praiser | March 19, 1981 |
Henry tries to write the story of how their secret identities were nearly discovered, but Kip encourages him to add slapstick comedy or sex.
| 16 | 16 | "The Show Must Go On" | Will Mackenzie | Howard Gewirtz & Ian Praiser | March 26, 1981 |
After singing along with a stand-up comedian (Bob Saget), Isabelle gets a chance to sing professionally at a nightclub.
| 17 | 17 | "The Hospital" | Will Mackenzie | David Chambers & Jack Carrerow | April 2, 1981 |
Buffy and Hildy go to work at the same hospital where Sonny works as a nurse.
| 18 | 18 | "Best Friends" | Chris Thompson & Don Van Atta | Chris Thompson | April 9, 1981 |
Henry becomes jealous of Kip's revived friendship with his childhood friend (Adrian Zmed), now a rock star.
| 19 | 19 | "Cahoots" | Will Mackenzie | David Chambers & Jack Carrerow | April 30, 1981 |
Kip and Amy agree to help each other get Sonny and Henry.

=== Season 2 (1981–82) ===
| No. overall | No. in season | Title | Directed by | Written by | Original release date |
|---|---|---|---|---|---|
| 20 | 1 | "The Truth and Other Lies" | Joel Zwick | Lenny Ripps | October 8, 1981 |
Kip decides to take his relationship with Sonny to the next level by revealing that he and Buffy are the same person.
| 21 | 2 | "There's No Business..." | Joel Zwick | Chris Thompson | October 15, 1981 |
Kip and Henry buy their own commercial production house from an unscrupulous salesman (Joe Regalbuto).
| 22 | 3 | "The Reunion" | Joel Zwick | Gary H. Miller | October 22, 1981 |
At a reunion of students from his old high school, Henry meets a deaf woman and recalls how badly he treated her on prom night.
| 23 | 4 | "One for You, One for Me" | Joel Zwick | Jack Carrerow | November 27, 1981 |
After berating Kip for being irresponsible with money, Henry buys a stolen VCR and is thrown in jail.
| 24 | 5 | "The Road to Monte Carlo" | Joel Zwick | Gary H. Miller | December 4, 1981 |
A near-death experience leaves Kip and Henry with a big insurance settlement, which they use to take a trip to Monte Carlo.
| 25 | 6 | "WaterBalloonGate" | Joel Zwick | David Chambers | December 11, 1981 |
Kip and Henry drop a water balloon on a car that turns out to belong to Richard Nixon. After being questioned by the Secret Service, Kip is so shaken that he gives up practical jokes.
| 26 | 7 | "All You Need is Love" | Joel Zwick | Terry Hart | December 18, 1981 |
Depressed after breaking up with another girlfriend (Stepfanie Kramer), Henry goes to a video dating service, where he meets a beautiful Satanist (Rita Wilson).
| 27 | 8 | "Other Than That, She's a Wonderful Person" | Joel Zwick | Stu Silver | December 25, 1981 |
Henry starts dating a pretty interior decorator (Jennifer Holmes) whom Kip detests.
| 28 | 9 | "The Slightly Illustrated Man" | Joel Zwick | Chris Thompson | January 8, 1982 |
Kip and Amy decides to prove their commitment to Sonny and Henry by getting tattoos.
| 29 | 10 | "The Two Percent Solution" | Joel Zwick | David Chambers & Jack Carrerow | January 15, 1982 |
Amy's small amount of stock in Kip and Henry's company gives her the deciding vote in a shareholder decision
| 30 | 11 | "Cablevision" | Joel Zwick | Jeff Franklin | January 22, 1982 |
Kip and Henry produce an episode-length cable variety show, including an appearance by their special guest star and kidnap victim Penny Marshall.
| 31 | 12 | "The Grandfather" | Joel Zwick | Story by : Lenny Ripps & Gary H. Miller; Teleplay by : Jeff Franklin & Terry Hart | February 4, 1982 |
Henry saves the life of a little girl who turns out to be the granddaughter of a mob boss.
| 32 | 13 | "Kip off the Old Block" | Joel Zwick | Lenny Ripps | February 11, 1982 |
Kip tries to prevent his parents (Jerry Hardin and K Callan) from breaking up.
| 33 | 14 | "Hildy's Dirt Nap" | Joel Zwick | Story by : David Chambers; Teleplay by : Jack Carrerow & Gary H. Miller | February 18, 1982 |
A middle-aged man falls in love with Hildy, so Henry fakes Hildy's death.
| 34 | 15 | "The Way Kip and Henry Were" | Joel Zwick | Lenny Ripps & Terry Hart | March 4, 1982 |
The guys recall how they gave up their youthful ambition and went to go work for Ruth.
| 35 | 16 | "Who's On Thirst?" | Joel Zwick | Terry Hart | March 11, 1982 |
Kip and Henry spend a weekend in a mountain cabin without anything to eat or drink.
| 36 | 17 | "Not With My Sister, You Pig" | Chris Thompson & Don Van Atta | Chris Thompson | March 18, 1982 |
After Henry dates Kip's sister, the guys get into a fight that lands them in the hospital.
| 37 | 18 | "Not the Last Picture Show" | Joel Zwick | Lenny Ripps | March 25, 1982 |
Kip and Henry imagine what life will be like when they're senior citizens.

== Theme song ==
The theme song for the opening credits was Billy Joel's "My Life", although it was a re-recorded version with Gary Bennett as the vocalist and Mike Lucas on piano. Some reruns shown in syndication (such as when USA Network aired reruns, as well as its later runs on MeTV) and all home video and DVD releases, use a vocal version of the show's end credit instrumental theme, "Shake Me Loose", performed by Stephanie Mills, for the opening credits, replacing "My Life".

== Reruns ==
NBC briefly aired reruns of Bosom Buddies in the summer of 1984, after the successes of Splash and Bachelor Party had made Hanks a major film star. Ratings were good, but there was no possibility of Hanks returning for a revival of the show. Reruns also aired on the USA Network until November 18, 1995, as well as on TBS and TV Land until the mid-2000s. More recently, Weigel Broadcasting has aired the series on some of its networks, including MeTV, MeTV+, and Decades (now known as Catchy Comedy). Catchy Comedy aired a "Catchy Binge" of the series 3 times; first on the weekend of May 27–28, 2023, then again on the weekend of April 13–14, 2024, and now on January 12, 2025.

In the U.K., Bosom Buddies was aired by Two ITV Companies LWT and TSW in the early '80s. The Paramount Channel repeated the series from November 1, 1995, to February 4, 2001.

== Home media ==
CBS DVD (distributed by Paramount) released both seasons of Bosom Buddies on Region 1 DVD. The original theme song "My Life" by Billy Joel was replaced with "Shake Me Loose", a song penned by show creator Chris Thompson, which was used during the show's syndication run. Many of the musical numbers featured during the show's run are edited or eliminated altogether from the DVD releases. Notable in this vein are the songs "Yakety Yak" (from the episode "Call Me Irresponsible"), "Chances Are" (from "All You Need is Love") and "Rock and Roll Heaven" (from "Hildy's Dirt Nap").

On February 6, 2018, CBS Home Entertainment released Bosom Buddies: The Complete Series on DVD in Region 1.

| DVD name | Ep # | Release date |
|---|---|---|
| The First Season | 19 | March 13, 2007 |
| The Second Season | 18 | September 4, 2007 |
| The Complete Series | 37 | February 6, 2018 |

== Pop-culture references ==
A shot-for-shot remake of the show's opening credits aired January 23, 2014, on Adult Swim as an installment of Adam Scott's The Greatest Event in Television History. The parody was directed by Lance Bangs and Scott and features Paul Rudd playing Tom Hanks' character Kip, and Scott playing Peter Scolari's character Henry. The theme song "My Life" by Billy Joel is actually sung by Joel instead of the sound-alike version used for the original TV series. In an extended mock "making-of" documentary preceding the opening credits remake, Hanks, Scolari, and Joel make cameo appearances.

In the 30 Rock episode "100", Hanks makes a cameo appearance where he references Bosom Buddies by singing lines from "My Life".

== See also ==
- Cross-dressing in film and television
- The Ugliest Girl in Town (1968)
- Three's Company (1977)
- Tootsie (1982)
- On Our Own (1994)
- Work It (2012)
