= List of The Hogan Family episodes =

The Hogan Family is an American television family sitcom. The series was on NBC for five seasons and then on CBS for its final season, running for a total of 110 episodes that aired between March 1, 1986, and July 20, 1991.

== Series overview ==
Season	Title	Episodes	Originally released			Rank	Rating
Season	Title	Episodes	First released	Last released	Network	Rank	Rating
1	Valerie	10	March 1, 1986	May 19, 1986	NBC	#24	18.1 (tied with Moonlighting and Falcon Crest)
2	Valerie	22	September 28, 1986	May 4, 1987	NBC	#39	14.8 (tied with The ABC Sunday Night Movie)
3	Valerie's Family: The Hogans	21	September 21, 1987	May 2, 1988	NBC	#20	16.9 (tied with My Two Dads)
4	The Hogan Family	21	October 3, 1988	May 8, 1989	NBC	#22	16.3 (tied with NBC Sunday Night Movie and The Wonder Years)
5	The Hogan Family	23	September 18, 1989	May 7, 1990	NBC	#32	14.2
6	The Hogan Family	13	September 15, 1990	July 20, 1991	CBS	#85	6.5 (tied with Cop Rock)

== Episodes ==
=== Season 1 (1986) ===
No. overall	No. in season	Title	Directed by	Written by	Original release date	Rating/share (households)
1	1	"Old Enough"	James Burrows	Charlie Hauck	March 1, 1986	19.8/33
2	2	"The Six"	Asaad Kelada	Chip Keyes & Doug Keyes	March 3, 1986	21.1/31
3	3	"The Wrong Stuff"	Peter Baldwin	Story by : Eric Cohen; Teleplay by : Chip Keyes & Doug Keyes	March 10, 1986	19.9/29
4	4	"One of the Boys"	Asaad Kelada	Jace Richdale	March 17, 1986	15.2/23
5	5	"Benefit of the Doubt"	Ellen Falcon	Eric Cohen	March 24, 1986	15.4/22
6	6	"Dog Day Afternoon"	Assad Kelada	Linda Marsh & Margie Peters	March 31, 1986	17.8/26
7	7	"Happy Anniversary"	Asaad Kelada	Linda Marsh & Margie Peters	April 7, 1986	18.6/28
8	8	"This Son for Hire"	Ellen Gittelsohn	Chip Keyes & Doug Keyes	April 14, 1986	16.5/24
9	9	"Sick House"	Asaad Kelada	Jace Richdale	May 5, 1986	16.0/26
10	10	"Executive Material"	Jim Drake	Chip Keyes & Doug Keyes	May 19, 1986	17.4/28

=== Season 2 (1986–87) ===
No. overall	No. in season	Title	Directed by	Written by	Original release date	Rating/share (households)
11	1	"Full Moon"	Jeff Chambers	Judy Pioli	September 28, 1986	15.4/23
12	2	"The Big Fix-Up"	Howard Storm	Story by : Russ Woody; Teleplay by : Russ Woody & Rick Mitz	October 5, 1986	15.9/23
13	3	"Of Human Blondage"	Jeff Chambers	Chip Keyes & Doug Keyes	October 12, 1986	16.8/25
14	4	"Caught on a Hot Tin Roof"	Peter Baldwin	Judy Piloi	November 2, 1986	14.5/21
15	5	"Leave It to Willie"	Peter Baldwin	Steven Pritzker	November 9, 1986	17.2/25
16	6	"Dr. No"	Peter Baldwin	Howard Ostroff	November 16, 1986	15.1/22
17	7	"One of a Kind"	Peter Baldwin	Irene Mecchi	November 23, 1986	13.6/19
18	8	"The Roots of All Evil"	Peter Baldwin	R.J. Colleary	November 30, 1986	13.2/19
19	9	"Small Packages"	Peter Baldwin	Chip Keyes & Doug Keyes	December 7, 1986	11.1/16
20	10	"The Way We're Not"	Howard Storm	Laura Schrock	December 14, 1986	11.5/17
21	11	"Boston Tea Party"	Howard Storm	Judy Pioli	January 4, 1987	11.9/17
22	12	"Never on Tuesday"	Howard Storm	Harriett Weiss & Patt Shea	January 11, 1987	13.0/18
23	13	"Wooly Bully"	Howard Storm	R.J. Colleary	January 18, 1987	14.9/21
24	14	"Bad Timing"	Howard Storm	Chip Keyes & Doug Keyes	February 8, 1987	17.0/25
25	15	"A Night to Remember"	Tony Mordente	Miklos F. Horvath	February 15, 1987	14.8/21
26	16	"Whose Team Is It Anyway?"	Peter Baldwin	Ken Kuta	February 22, 1987	14.3/20
27	17	"Community Theatre"	Peter Baldwin	Chip Keyes & Doug Keyes	March 1, 1987	14.6/20
28	18	"Hogan vs. Hogan"	Howard Storm	Chip Keyes & Doug Keyes & Judi Pioli	March 16, 1987	15.7/23
29	19	"Oedipus Wrecks"	Howard Storm	Chip Keyes & Doug Keyes & Judi Pioli	March 23, 1987	18.7/28
30	20	"Shape Up and Move Out"	Peter Baldwin	Chip Keyes & Doug Keyes & Judi Pioli	April 6, 1987	16.9/26
31	21	"Babes in the Woods"	Peter Baldwin	Laura Shrock & R.J. Colleary	April 13, 1987	17.2/27
32	22	"The Return of Uncle Skip"	Peter Baldwin	Chip Keyes & Doug Keyes	May 4, 1987	16.1/25

=== Season 3 (1987–88) ===
No. overall	No. in season	Title	Directed by	Written by	Original release date	Rating/share (households)
33	1	"Movin' On"	Judy Pioli	Chip Keyes & Doug Keyes & Judy Pioli	September 21, 1987	16.3/26
34	2	"Liars and Other Strangers"	Howard Storm	Daphne Pollon & David Castro	September 28, 1987	18.6/28
35	3	"Burned Out"	Howard Storm	Chip Keyes & Doug Keyes & Judy Pioli	October 5, 1987	17.6/27
36	4	"Take My Wife, Please"	Richard Correll	Shari Hearn	October 12, 1987	18.4/28
37	5	"You've Got to Believe"	Howard Storm	Barry Gold	October 19, 1987	16.3/24
38	6	"A Room with No View"	Howard Storm	Zach Wechsler & Jay Abramowitz	November 2, 1987	16.8/24
39	7	"You Bet Your Life"	Howard Storm	Allen Estrin & Mark Estrin	November 9, 1987	16.4/24
40	8	"School of Hard Knocks"	Howard Storm	Story by : Jim Kearns; Teleplay by : Zach Wechsler & Jay Abramowitz	November 16, 1987	17.5/26
41	9	"Nightmare on Oak Street"	Richard Correll	Chip Keyes & Doug Keyes & Judy Pioli	November 23, 1987	16.1/24
42	10	"Poetic Injustice"	Art Dielhenn	Jeffrey Davis	December 16, 1987	14.5/23
43	11	"Love with the Proper Hogan"	Howard Storm	Shari Hearn	December 28, 1987	16.9/27
44	12	"Faulty Attraction"	Stephen Zuckerman	Barry Gold	January 4, 1988	20.1/28
45	13	"Teacher's Pet"	Howard Storm	Chip Keyes & Doug Keyes & Judy Pioli	January 11, 1988	18.6/27
46	14	"Mother Poole's Visit"	Richard Correll	Chip Keyes & Doug Keyes & Judy Pioli	January 18, 1988	18.4/27
47	15	"Mark and Willie's Day Off"	Howard Storm	Zach Wechsler & Jay Abramowitz	January 25, 1988	13.5/20
48	16	"A Restaurant Named Desire"	Howard Storm	Chip Keyes & Doug Keyes & Judy Pioli	February 15, 1988	15.6/22
49	17	"The King and I"	Howard Storm	Chip Keyes & Doug Keyes & Judy Pioli	February 22, 1988	16.0/23
50	18	"Skip III: The Bailout"	Howard Storm	Barry Gold	March 7, 1988	16.6/25
51	19	"Help Wanted"	Howard Storm	Chip Keyes & Doug Keyes & Bob Keyes	March 14, 1988	17.9/27
52	20	"48 Hours"	Howard Storm	Bob Keyes	March 21, 1988	18.3/28
53	21	"Close Encounters"	Kent Bateman	Story by : Don Rhymer; Teleplay by : Chip Keyes & Doug Keyes & Judy Pioli & Bob Keyes	May 2, 1988	14.5/24

=== Season 4 (1988–89) ===
No. overall	No. in season	Title	Directed by	Written by	Original release date	US viewers (millions)	Rating/share (households)
54	1	"Animal House"	Richard Correll	Chip Keyes & Doug Keyes & Judy Pioli & Bob Keyes	October 3, 1988	28.5	18.1/28
55	2	"Hair Today, Gone Tomorrow"	Richard Correll	Barry Gold	October 10, 1988	26.6	16.9/25
56	3	"Dad's First Date"	Richard Correll	Chip Keyes & Doug Keyes & Judy Pioli & Bob Keyes	October 17, 1988	27.6	17.7/27
57	4	"Foiled Again"	Richard Correll	Ken Kuta	November 14, 1988	28.2	17.9/27
58	5	"Save Baby Mark"	Richard Correll	Bob Keyes	November 21, 1988	27.2	17.4/26
59	6	"Saturday Night Feverish"	Richard Correll	Shari Hearn	November 28, 1988	21.9	15.0/21
60	7	"Tobacco Road"	Richard Correll	Chip Keyes & Doug Keyes	December 5, 1988	21.8	14.3/20
61	8	"The Big Sleep"	Stephen Zuckerman	Shari Hearn	December 12, 1988	26.3	16.1/24
62	9	"Secretarial Poole"	Jason Bateman	Chip Keyes & Doug Keyes & Bob Keyes	January 9, 1989	24.9	15.4/22
63	10	"Strangers on a Train"	Richard Correll	Chip Keyes & Doug Keyes	January 16, 1989	25.7	15.6/23
64	11	"The Naked Truth"	Judy Pioli	Barry Gold	January 23, 1989	28.4	17.9/26
65	12	"Rebel With a Cause"	Howard Storm	Chip Keyes & Doug Keyes	February 13, 1989	26.0	15.7/23
66	13	"Boy Meets Girl (Part 1)"	Kent Bateman	Chip Keyes & Doug Keyes	February 20, 1989	27.5	16.5/24
67	14	"Boy Loses Girl (Part 2)"	Howard Storm	Judy Pioli & Bob Keyes	February 27, 1989	28.2	17.3/25
68	15	"Viva Las Vegas"	Lee Shallat	Chip Keyes & Doug Keyes	March 6, 1989	31.5	18.9/28
69	16	"Double Date"	Howard Storm	Ken Kuta	March 13, 1989	25.1	15.8/24
70	17	"The Long Goodbye"	Howard Storm	Miklos Horvath	March 20, 1989	26.8	16.4/25
71	18	"Oh Dad, Poor Dad"	Peter Baldwin	Judy Pioli & Bob Keyes	March 27, 1989	28.0	16.9/26
72	19	"Slapshot"	Howard Storm	Frank Carrasquillo & Mel Kohl	April 3, 1989	23.8	15.7/25
73	20	"Private Lessons"	James O'Keefe	Chip Keyes & Doug Keyes	April 23, 1989	10.5	7.2/13
74	21	"Coming to America"	Howard Storm	Chip Keyes & Doug Keyes	May 8, 1989	24.0	15.4/25

=== Season 5 (1989–90) ===
No. overall	No. in season	Title	Directed by	Written by	Original release date	US viewers (millions)
75	1	"Paris: Part 1"	Richard Correll	Bob Keyes	September 18, 1989	21.9
76	2	"Paris: Part 2"	Richard Correll	Chip Keyes & Doug Keyes	September 25, 1989	21.6
77	3	"Paris: Part 3"	Richard Correll	Chip Keyes & Doug Keyes	October 2, 1989	24.1
78	4	"The Tracks of My Tears"	Richard Correll	Shari Hearn	October 9, 1989	23.0
79	5	"The Rivals"	Peter Baldwin	Judy Pioli	October 16, 1989	24.4
80	6	"License to Drive"	Richard Correll	Don Rhymer	October 23, 1989	21.5
81	7	"The Hospital"	Richard Correll	Chip Keyes & Doug Keyes	November 6, 1989	22.7
82	8	"Get a Job"	Richard Correll	Chuck Tately & Kevin White	November 13, 1989	24.2
83	9	"Stir Crazy"	Peter Baldwin	Bob Keyes	November 20, 1989	22.8
84	10	"Educating Rita"	Jason Bateman	Shari Hearn	November 27, 1989	23.9
85	11	"Stan and Deliver"	Lee Shallat	Judy Pioli	December 4, 1989	24.0
86	12	"Sandy in Love"	Peter Baldwin	Judy Pioli	December 11, 1989	23.5
87	13	"Snowbound"	Kent Bateman	Chuck Tately & Kevin White	January 8, 1990	25.1
88	14	"Bad Day at Bossy Burger"	Richard Correll	Bob Keyes	January 15, 1990	22.9
89	15	"The Franklin Family"	Peter Baldwin	Barry Gold	January 22, 1990	18.4
Uncle Skip adopts the Hogans to try to impress an old friend.
90	16	"Forget Me Not"	Richard Correll	Story by : Tom Cline; Teleplay by : Chip Keyes & Doug Keyes	January 29, 1990	21.6
91	17	"Heartburn"	Peter Baldwin	Chip Keyes & Doug Keyes	February 5, 1990	21.9
92	18	"The Go-Between"	Richard Correll	Shari Hearn	February 19, 1990	22.0
93	19	"Used Car"	Peter Baldwin	Miklos F. Horvath	February 26, 1990	24.0
94	20	"Mutiny on the Bossy"	James O'Keefe	Chuck Tately & Kevin White	March 5, 1990	18.8
95	21	"Crimes and Misdemeanors"	Harriette Regan	Don Rhymer	March 12, 1990	21.8
96	22	"A Matter of Principal"	Stewart A. Lyons	Shari Hearn	March 19, 1990	20.1
97	23	"Prom, Lies and Videotape"	Peter Baldwin	Don Rhymer	May 7, 1990	12.6

=== Season 6 (1990–91) ===
No. overall	No. in season	Title	Directed by	Written by	Original release date	US viewers (millions)
98	1	"California Dreamin: Part 1"	Stewart A. Lyons	Larry Spencer & Michael Loman	September 15, 1990	11.5
99	2	"California Dreamin: Part 2"	Stewart A. Lyons	Shari Hearn	September 22, 1990	12.8
100	3	"The Baby Stops Here"	Judy Pioli	Richard Albrecht & Casey Keller	September 29, 1990	12.3
101	4	"The Play's the Thing"	Stewart A. Lyons	Daryl Busby	October 13, 1990	8.7
102	5	"From Russia with Fries"	Gerren Keith	Steve Granat & Mel Sherer	October 27, 1990	10.7
103	6	"Ex Marks the Spot"	Gerren Keith	Alicia Marie Schudt	November 3, 1990	11.1
104	7	"Come Fly with Me"	Jack Shea	Richard Albrecht & Casey Keller	November 10, 1990	11.3
105	8	"It Happened One Night... or Did It?"	Jason Bateman	R.J. Colleary	November 17, 1990	7.8
106	9	"The Best of Friends, Worst of Times"	Jack Shea	Story by : Tom Hodges; Teleplay by : Michael Loman	December 1, 1990	10.2
107	10	"A Sneaking Suspicion"	Jack Shea	Larry Spencer & Michael Loman	July 10, 1991	8.0
108	11	"A Family Affair"	Gerren Keith	Ann Marcus	July 17, 1991	7.4
109	12	"Isn't It Romantic?"	Kent Bateman	Daryl Busby	July 20, 1991	5.1
110	13	"Ho, Ho, Hogans"	Gerren Keith	Shari Hearn	July 20, 1991	6.4
