= Two of a Kind (American TV series) =

American television sitcom (1998–1999)

- Genre: Sitcom
- Created by: Howard Adler; Robert Griffard
- Developed by: Robert L. Boyett Thomas L. Miller; Michael Warren
- Starring: Mary-Kate Olsen; Ashley Olsen; Christopher Sieber; Sally Wheeler; Orlando Brown; David Valcin; Jesse Lee; Martin Spanjers; Ernie Grunwald
- Theme music composer: Jesse Frederick; Bennett Salvay
- Country of origin: United States
- Original language: English
- No. of seasons: 1
- No. of episodes: 22

Production
- Executive producers: Robert Griffard; Howard Adler; Thomas L. Miller; Robert L. Boyett; Michael Warren
- Production locations: Warner Bros. Studios; Burbank, California
- Camera setup: Film; Multi-camera
- Running time: 24 minutes (approx.)
- Production companies: Griffard/Adler Productions; Dualstar Productions; Miller-Boyett-Warren Productions; Warner Bros. Television

Original release
- Network: ABC
- Release: September 25, 1998 – July 9, 1999

Related
- So Little Time

Two of a Kind is an American sitcom that aired on ABC as part of the network's TGIF line-up, starring Mary-Kate and Ashley Olsen in their first television series since Full House ended in 1995. The show aired from September 25, 1998, to July 9, 1999.

The series was produced by Griffard/Adler Productions, Dualstar Productions, and Miller-Boyett-Warren Productions, in association with Warner Bros. Television. It was the last series to be produced by Miller-Boyett Productions prior to the company's initial shutdown in 1999.

== Premise ==
Kevin Burke (Christopher Sieber) is a college professor and widower father living in Chicago, Illinois, who believes there is a scientific explanation for everything except how to control his scheming 12-year-old daughters. Mary-Kate and Ashley Burke (Mary-Kate and Ashley Olsen) are twin sisters, who are complete opposites; Mary-Kate is a tomboy whose biggest interest is perfecting her jumpshot and curveball and whose worst subject in school is math. Ashley is a girly girl who makes straight As and dreams of a modeling career and dancing. Kevin's wife died prior to the series.

The other main character is Carrie (Sally Wheeler), a 26-year-old woman in Kevin's class, who has come late to college after exploring the world. Carrie is quirky, difficult, beautiful, and quick to speak her mind, so when she answers Kevin's ad for a part-time babysitter for the girls, he is convinced she's nothing but trouble and is in favor of their next-door neighbor Mrs. Baker babysitting Mary-Kate and Ashley. The girls think Carrie is a dream-sitter come true, and agree to put their differences aside to join forces to make a little chemistry between their by-the-book father and the beautiful woman who seems to drive him crazy in all the right ways.

== Cast and characters ==
=== Main cast ===
Cast of Two of a Kind, starting from the top-left going clockwise: Sally Wheeler (Carrie), Christopher Sieber (Kevin) and Mary-Kate & Ashley Olsen

- Mary-Kate Olsen as Mary-Kate Burke – A 12-year-old tomboy who loves sports, horses, and modeling. She has two friends, Max and Brian. She also has a math tutor named Taylor. Mary-Kate has Dyscalculia. Mary-Kate's favorite color is red.
- Ashley Olsen as Ashley Burke – A 12-year-old girly girl who loves fashion, dancing, make up, cheerleading, and modeling. Ashley's a Straight A student. She's better at math than Mary-Kate. Ashley also has a first crush when Mary Kate's math tutor Taylor Donovan came over. She's friends with Nicole and the popular Jennifer Dilber. In "Carrie Moves In" Ashley joins Mary-Kate's karate class. Ashley's favorite color is green.
- Christopher Sieber as Kevin Burke – The uptight father of Mary-Kate and Ashley. He is a strict, but loving parent who constantly worries about them. He is a widower; his wife Jan died three years prior to the series. With the encouragement of Carrie and Eddie, he reenters the dating scene. Kevin plays the saxophone.
- Sally Wheeler as Carrie Moore – The bubbly, free-spirited babysitter of the twins, and a student of Kevin. Her confidence and ambition often drive Kevin crazy, but he sees that she is a good mother figure for the twins. She is an older student, having dropped out to explore the world for several years. Carrie eventually moves into the Burkes’ basement after Kevin accidentally causes her to get evicted from her apartment.
- Orlando Brown as Max (episodes 1–13) – Mary-Kate and Ashley's friend and classmate. He seems to be very close with Brian.
- David Valcin as Edward "Eddie" Fairbanks (episodes 2–14) – Kevin's best friend since childhood, a flirty divorcee and professional plumber. He is known for constantly hitting on women and butting heads with Carrie.
- Jesse Lee as Taylor Donovan (episodes 2–8) – Mary-Kate's math tutor and Ashley's first crush.
- Martin Spanjers as Brian (episodes 1–13) – Mary-Kate and Ashley's friend and classmate. Although he is known to flirt with every girl at school, he has a crush on Ashley.
- Ernie Grunwald as Paul (episode 14–22; previously recurring) – Carrie's classmate. He is a computer whiz also has a Saturday job as a pizza delivery guy. He has a crush on Carrie but is too afraid to admit it.

=== Recurring cast ===
- Anastasia Emmons as Jennifer Dilber – Ashley's friend. Jennifer is the most popular girl in 7th Grade. Ashley invites Jennifer to a sleepover that she has in the hopes of becoming popular and getting to sit with her at lunch.
- Samantha Smith as Nancy Carlson, Carrie's high school friend who dates Kevin. She is a botanist.
- David Lascher as Matthew "Matt" Burke – Kevin's irresponsible younger brother. He briefly dated Carrie.

=== Notable guest stars ===
- Kimberly J. Brown as Nicole, Ashley's friend ("You've Got a Friend", "My Boyfriend's Back")
- Patrick Fabian as Alex Reardon, Carrie's ex-boyfriend ("My Boyfriend's Back")
- Blake Foster as Carter, a boy in Mary-Kate's karate class that she develops a crush on ("Carrie Moves In")
- Amanda Fuller as Courtney Collins, the school head cheerleader that propositions Ashley to join the squad ("Kevin Burke's Day Off")
- Emile Hirsch as Jeremy, a boy that Mary-Kate develops a crush on who is into swing dancing ("Let's Dance")
- Jean Speegle Howard as Mrs. Edna Baker, the next door neighbor of Kevin, Mary-Kate, and Ashley. Mrs. Baker enjoys knitting and watching South Park. Kevin prefers to have Mrs. Baker babysit Mary-Kate and Ashley. Mrs. Baker begins dating Mr. Fillmore and moves in with him in the pilot episode. Mrs. Baker was also Mary-Kate and Ashley's babysitter prior to Carrie being hired ("Putting Two 'N' Two Together", "Peeping Twins")
- Rance Howard as Mr. Fillmore, another next door neighbor of Kevin, Mary-Kate, and Ashley. ("Putting Two 'N' Two Together", "Peeping Twins") Mr. Fillmore begins dating Mrs. Baker in the pilot episode. In "Peeping Twins" the girls mistakenly believe that Mrs. Baker murdered Mr. Fillmore.
- Claire Stansfield as Tarrah James, a supermodel who asks Kevin on a date ("Model Behavior")
- David Sutcliffe as Rick, an arrogant student of Kevin ("First Crush")
- Wayne Tippit as Father Conrad ("A Very Carrie Christmas")
- Hallie Todd as Marci, Kevin's girlfriend ("Breaking Them Up Is Hard to Do")
- Paul Willson as Lenny, a pet store owner ("The Heartbreak Kid")

== Theme music and opening sequence ==
The theme music which accompanied the opening title sequence was composed by Jesse Frederick and Bennett Salvay, and was the second theme composed by Frederick and Salvay that does not include lyrics, coming after The Family Man, which was also produced by Miller-Boyett.

The opening sequence varied slightly from week to week, featured clips of Kevin, Carrie and the girls playing in the park. The scenes, which always slightly vary, include the girls rollerblading, the girls on the swing with Carrie, the girls playing frisbee with Kevin, Carrie and Kevin playing basketball, Carrie, Kevin and the girls playing a very large beach ball, the girls doing cartwheels and jumping around barefoot. It always slow-motion’s and freezes during certain parts and poses during the theme and the camera pans round, in a style/reference to The Matrix. The opening sequence only includes the show title and the executive producers' names, unlike previous Miller-Boyett series, whose opening sequences featured the cast and producers names in the sequence. The names of the show's cast members were instead shown in the opening teaser, prior to the opening credits.

== Episodes ==
No.	Title	Directed by	Written by	Original release date	Prod. code	Viewers (millions)
1	"Putting Two 'N' Two Together"	Gil Junger	Howard Adler & Robert Griffard	September 25, 1998	475140	11.87
Mary-Kate and Ashley are fed up with having a babysitter, especially if it's their elderly neighbor, Mrs. Baker (Jean Speegle Howard). But when they meet Carrie, they are determined to convince their father Kevin to hire her. Kevin has his doubts about hiring Carrie, and thinks that it's more practical to have Mrs. Baker babysit Mary-Kate and Ashley. Note: This is the pilot episode of "Two of a Kind". In this episode Mary-Kate and Ashley are 11, but in later episodes they're 12.
2	"Prelude to a Kiss"	Gil Junger	Dan Cross & David Hoge	October 2, 1998	467802	10.51
Ashley becomes jealous when, during a slumber party, Mary-Kate reveals that she has kissed a boy. Also, after Paul finds out that Carrie spent the night at Kevin's house, he assumes their relationship is more than it actually is which leads to rumors about a more personal "teacher-student relationship". Note: Although this episode aired prior to "The Tutor", the events of that episode came before "Prelude to a Kiss". Ashley admits to having a crush on Taylor, even though he wasn't hired until "The Tutor".
3	"The Tutor"	Richard Correll	Bob Keyes & Doug Keyes	October 9, 1998	467801	12.09
Kevin hires a math tutor for Mary-Kate. Ashley develops a crush on him, and convinces Mary-Kate to switch places so they can each do what they want. But their scheme doesn't go as planned. Meanwhile, Carrie convinces Kevin to ask out a woman at a coffee shop.
4	"First Crush"	Gil Junger	Howard Adler & Robert Griffard	October 16, 1998	467803	11.77
Ashley is ecstatic when she gets assigned to do a history project with her crush, Pokey Valentine. But Mary-Kate faces a dilemma when she believes Pokey has asked her out on a date. Meanwhile, Kevin is surprised to learn that Carrie is seeing an arrogant student.
5	"Breaking Them Up is Hard to Do"	Richard Correll	Bob Keyes & Doug Keyes	October 23, 1998	467806	10.37
Mary-Kate and Ashley become worried about losing Carrie when Kevin begins dating a woman named Marci. To prevent that from happening, they come up with a plan to get Marci to dump Kevin.
6	"Nightmare on Carrie's Street"	Richard Correll	Fred Rubin	October 30, 1998	467805	11.34
With it being her first year of not traveling, Carrie throws a Halloween party. Mary-Kate and Ashley want to attend, but are forbidden by Kevin since its a college party. But when a last-minute change causes Eddie to take them trick-or-treating, they switch costumes with Max and Brian to attend.
7	"The Heartbreak Kid"	Richard Correll	Jillian Tohber	November 6, 1998	467807	12.74
Kevin is worried when Mary-Kate wants a pet due to her previous bad experiences with taking care of animals. Carrie and Mary-Kate buy a homing pigeon, thinking this pet will actually stay alive. Meanwhile, Ashley is heartbroken when she finds out that Taylor has a girlfriend.
8	"You've Got a Friend"	Richard Correll	Dan Cross & David Hoge	November 13, 1998	467808	10.90
Ashley makes a new friend, Nicole (Kimberly J. Brown), leaving Mary-Kate feeling left out in the cold. Trying to procrastinate on an English paper, Carrie becomes a mediator when Eddie and Kevin get into a fight.
9	"Model Behavior"	Richard Correll	Tom Amundsen	November 20, 1998	467809	10.49
Ashley is excited when a model search for a teen magazine takes place at their school, but Mary-Kate is chosen over Ashley. Carrie wants to set up Kevin with her friend Nancy, but the model of the photoshoot (Claire Stansfield) asks him to accompany her to a party. But he ends up being nothing more than a boy toy.
10	"Peeping Twins"	Gil Junger	Larry Kase & Joel Ronkin	November 27, 1998	467804	10.12
After Kevin buys them a new telescope, Mary-Kate and Ashley snoop on their neighbors. While looking, they think that they've witnessed their neighbor Mrs. Baker murder her boyfriend. The situation gets even scarier for the twins when Kevin asks Mrs. Baker to babysit them while he and Carrie attend a jazz concert. Meanwhile, Carrie hears Kevin play the saxophone, and encourages him to perform at a jazz club. But the night doesn't go as planned when her car breaks down.
11	"A Very Carrie Christmas"	Richard Correll	R. Lee Fleming, Jr.	December 11, 1998	467811	10.97
Carrie accepts Kevin's invitation to spend Christmas with him and the girls. Carrie brings a homeless man, Walter, as her guest to Christmas dinner. Sometime during dinner, everyone is shocked to find out that Walter stole all their gifts. But they appreciate it when they learn the truth about why he did it.
12	"Let's Dance"	Richard Correll	Bob Keyes & Doug Keyes	January 8, 1999	467810	11.10
Mary-Kate and Ashley prepare for their first school dance. Mary-Kate wants to dance with Jeremy (Emile Hirsch), but he tells her that he only knows how to swing dance. Meanwhile, Carrie becomes Kevin's research assistant to earn some extra money, but it becomes a disaster; and Kevin chaperones the dance.
13	"Split Decision"	Richard Correll	Chip Keyes	January 15, 1999	467812	11.13
Mary-Kate and Ashley begin arguing more frequently, which causes them to move into separate rooms. They soon learn that they miss each other, and move back into the same room. Meanwhile, Carrie begins dating Kevin's doctor, but creates awkwardness for both her and Kevin when she believes he wears a bra.
14	"My Boyfriend's Back"	Richard Correll	Larry Kase & Joel Ronkin	January 29, 1999	467813	10.91
Carrie's ex-boyfriend Alex Reardon (Patrick Fabian) is back in town, and Carrie feels that she must make herself look as successful as he is. Carrie convinces Kevin to pretend to be her fiancé to make Alex jealous. On the same night when Carrie and Kevin are out, the twins have a party that spirals out of control.
15	"No Man's Land"	Richard Correll	Dan Cross & David Hoge	February 12, 1999	467814	10.88
Ashley develops a crush on Mary-Kate's friend Eric, who is an avid sports fan. Looking to impress him, she has Mary-Kate teach her everything about sports. Meanwhile, Carrie tries to comfort her heartbroken friend Leslie, who has just been dumped by her boyfriend. But her friendships with both Leslie and Kevin are rattled when Kevin gives bad advice and miscommunicates to Leslie.
16	"Carrie Moves In"	Richard Correll	Fred Rubin	February 19, 1999	467815	10.59
Carrie is evicted from her apartment when Kevin forgets to mail her rent check. After discovering his basement, she convinces him to transform it into an apartment. But when the cost is too high, a dispute occurs between Carrie and Kevin that causes them to rethink the arrangement. Meanwhile, Mary-Kate likes a boy in her karate class, but debates whether or not she should let him win when they face each other in a match.
17	"Mr. Right Under Your Nose"	Jason Bateman	Dan Cross & David Hoge	February 26, 1999	467816	10.57
After failing to raise all the money that was promised for her school fundraiser, Mary-Kate convinces Ashley to gamble the money that she did earn on a basketball game, in order to double her money. Kevin begins dating Carrie's friend Nancy, which causes Carrie to feel jealous seeing them have a good time.
18	"Welcome Matt"	Ted Wass	Bob Keyes & Doug Keyes	March 12, 1999	467817	10.66
Kevin is surprised when his brother Matt (David Lascher) arrives for a visit unexpectedly. But he is not pleased when Matt announces he is planning on moving to Chicago, as he is notoriously immature and unreliable. Kevin becomes increasingly irritated by Matt's behavior, which boils over when he takes them to a hockey game where Mary-Kate is injured. Ashley begins a regiment to look great for picture day, but one of Matt's gifts gives her a large ink stain on her face.
19	"The Odd Couples"	Joel Zwick	Tom Amundsen	March 19, 1999	467818	9.66
Mary-Kate and Ashley have been paired up with male partners for a school assignment, in order to learn about marriage. But the project reeks havoc on the household as Ashley and Mary-Kate go through the ups and downs of the project. Kevin is concerned when Carrie begins dating Matt, despite his advice to the contrary.
20	"When a Man Leaves a Woman"	Charles H. Siegel	Dan Cross & David Hoge	March 26, 1999	467820	9.54
Kevin realizes that he is bored with girlfriend Nancy, and agonizes over how to end the relationship. But Nancy misinterprets his attempt and becomes even more serious about him. Meanwhile, Kevin is puzzled when Mary-Kate declines Carrie's invitation to go horseback-riding – something she loved when her mother was alive – while Ashley gets into trouble for using his credit card without his permission.
21	"The Goodbye Girl"	Richard Correll	Bob Keyes & Doug Keyes	April 2, 1999	467821	9.09
Carrie has plans for a spontaneous journey through South America for the summer. Before she leaves, the twins trick Kevin and Carrie into having dinner together at a restaurant. At the airport, Kevin is disappointed to see that Carrie is traveling to South America with a classmate. In the end, Carrie kisses Kevin, and then boards the plane.
22	"Kevin Burke's Day Off"	Richard Correll	Chip Keyes	July 9, 1999	467819	6.78
To be accepted as a member of the cheerleading squad, Ashley must pull a mean prank on Mary-Kate's new friend Gabrielle. Ashley soon learns that nothing is worth doing something so mean to another person. Meanwhile, Carrie convinces Kevin to take a day off from work, and the two go to a ballgame together. But what will Kevin's boss say when he finds out? Note: This episode premiered in July as a burn off, three months after the show's actual finale "The Goodbye Girl" aired in April. The episode's title is a parody of the 1986 film, Ferris Bueller's Day Off.

== Broadcast and syndication ==
After its cancellation, the show gained more of an audience when reruns began airing on ABC Family in the United States. It ran on the network starting in 1999 (a few months after its cancellation), when the network was Fox Family, and continued after the channel's purchase by The Walt Disney Company until 2004. ABC Family separated the closing credits and the tag scene, in the manner that they originally aired on ABC.

In Italy, it aired on Disney Channel under the name Due gemelle e una tata (Two Twins and a Nanny) from January until February 2004.

In the United Kingdom, reruns of the series also aired on Nickelodeon, Disney Channel and Pop Girl. The international networks ran the closing credits over the tag scene.

== Books ==
Some episodes were written and released as books. Some other Two of a Kind novels were just made up by the authors. As of December 16, 2006, 40 books have been released. Some of the books are in the "Two of a Kind Diaries" subseries, where they are written in the girls' perspectives, as if they are writing in a diary. The first book is "It's a Twin Thing". Initially, the books are actually simplified versions of the episode scripts, while currently, they just feature its main characters.

Despite the lack of success for the television series, the books are more successful towards children and pre-teens.

1. It's a Twin Thing
2. How to Flunk Your First Date
3. The Sleepover Secret
4. One Twin Too Many
5. To Snoop or Not to Snoop?
6. My Sister the Super-model
7. Two's a Crowd
8. Let's Party!
9. Calling All Boys (Diaries subseries, #1)
10. Winner Take All (Diaries subseries, #2)
11. P.S. Wish You Were Here (Diaries subseries, #3)
12. The Cool Club
13. War of the Wardrobes
14. Bye-Bye Boyfriend
15. It's Snow Problem
16. Likes Me, Likes Me Not
17. Shore Thing (Diaries subseries, #4)
18. Two For The Road (Diaries subseries, #5)
19. Surprise, Surprise
20. Sealed With a Kiss
21. Now You See Him, Now You Don't
22. April Fools Rules
23. Island Girls (Diaries subseries, #6)
24. Surf, Sand & Secrets (Diaries subseries, #7)
25. Closer Than Ever
26. The Perfect Gift
27. The Facts About Flirting
28. The Dream Date Debate
29. Love Set Match (Diaries subseries, #8)
30. Making A Splash (Diaries subseries, #9)
31. Dare To Scare (Diaries subseries, #10)
32. Santa Girls (Diaries subseries, #11)
33. Heart to Heart (Diaries subseries, #12)
34. Prom Princess (Diaries subseries, #13)
35. Camp Rock 'n' Roll (Diaries subseries, #14)
36. Twist and Shout (Diaries subseries, #15)
37. Hocus-pocus (Diaries subseries, #16)
38. Holiday Magic (Diaries subseries, #17)
39. Candles, Cake, Celebrate! (Diaries subseries, #18)
40. Wish on a Star (Diaries subseries, #19)
