= Merlin Santana =

American actor (1976–2002)

- Santana in 2002
- Born: Merlin Thomas Santana; March 14, 1976; Manhattan, New York, U.S.
- Died: November 9, 2002 (aged 26); Los Angeles, California, U.S.
- Cause of death: Gunshot wound
- Resting place: Saint Raymond's Cemetery; The Bronx, New York, U.S.
- Occupations: Actor; rapper
- Years active: 1990–2002
- Children: 1

Merlin Thomas Santana (March 14, 1976 – November 9, 2002) was an American actor and rapper. Beginning his career in the early 1990s, Santana was best known for his roles as Marcus Dixon on Getting By, Marcus Henry in Under One Roof and Romeo Santana on The WB sitcom The Steve Harvey Show (1996–2002).

== Early life ==
Merlin Thomas Santana was born on March 14, 1976 in Washington Heights, Manhattan. He began his career at the age of three as an advertising model for a fast food chain. His first screen appearance was as an extra in the Woody Allen film, The Purple Rose of Cairo.

== Acting career ==
In 1991, Santana landed a recurring role on The Cosby Show as Stanley, the boyfriend of Rudy Huxtable and the rival of Rudy's friend Kenny (Deon Richmond). He was then cast as Marcus Dixon in the short-lived sitcom, Getting By, starring Cindy Williams and Telma Hopkins. Deon Richmond was cast as his brother Darren, due to their interaction on The Cosby Show.

In November 1994, Santana appeared on Sister, Sister as Joey, who falls in love with Tia and Tamera (Tia and Tamera Mowry) at Rocket Burger.

In 1995, Santana was cast as Marcus Henry in the short-lived CBS family drama Under One Roof, co-starring with James Earl Jones, Joe Morton and Vanessa Bell Calloway. Between 1996 and 1999, he played the role of Ohagi on Moesha.

In 1996, he landed the role of Romeo Santana on The Steve Harvey Show. In 2001, he played the role of Jermaine in the movie Flossin. In 2002, he appeared in the VH1 TV movie, Play'd: A Hip Hop Story with Toni Braxton. That same year, Santana had a role in the Eddie Murphy comedy Showtime. His last television acting role was on the UPN series, Half & Half, while his last film role was in the 2003 comedy film, The Blues with Deon Richmond.

== Murder, burial, and trial ==
On November 9, 2002, at approximately 2:39 a.m., LAPD officers were flagged down by a male motorist at the intersection of Crenshaw Boulevard and Exposition Boulevard. The motorist, 23-year-old Brandon Adams, told the officers his passenger, 26-year-old Merlin Santana, had been shot. Officers noted that Santana had been shot and called for paramedics. The Los Angeles Fire Department pronounced Santana deceased at the scene. Earlier that morning, Santana and Adams had been sitting in a vehicle, with Adams in the driver's seat and Santana in the front passenger's seat, with two minor females, ages 14 and 15, at the 3800 block of Victoria Avenue in Crenshaw, Los Angeles when someone fired on them. A bullet passed through the trunk of the vehicle and through the front passenger's headrest, striking Santana and killing him.

Santana was buried in the Holy Cross section of Saint Raymond's Cemetery and Mausoleum in Throggs Neck, in The Bronx.

21-year-old Damien Andre Gates and 25-year-old Brandon Douglas Bynes, both of Los Angeles, were charged with Santana's murder and the attempted murder of Adams in November 2002. Both men entered a not guilty plea. Gates, who fired the bullet that struck Santana, was found guilty of first degree murder and sentenced to three consecutive life sentences plus 70 years, and Bynes, who fired on the vehicle but did not injure anyone, pled guilty to voluntary manslaughter and assault with a deadly weapon was sentenced to 23 years in prison. Gates was granted parole on September 6, 2023.

Weeks after Gates and Bynes were sentenced, 17-year-old Monique King was charged with second-degree murder and attempted murder for her role in Santana's death. King, who was 15 years old and a runaway at the time of the shooting, told Gates and Bynes that Santana had made sexual advances towards her, a claim she later admitted wasn't true, which motivated them to attack Santana. King also helped the two men flee the scene by acting as a getaway driver. King was convicted but acquitted, her charges lessened to perjury and voluntary manslaughter. A judge with the Superior Courts of California ordered that King be remanded to a California Youth Authority prison until the age of 25.

== Filmography ==
=== Film ===
Year	Title	Role	Notes
1991	The Cabinet of Dr. Ramirez	Newsboy	
1992	In the Line of Duty: Street War	Mikie	TV movie
2000	The Smoker	-	Short
2001	Flossin	Jermaine	
2002	Showtime	Hector	
2002	Play'd: A Hip Hop Story	Mayhem	TV movie
2003	The Blues	Goya	Posthumous release

=== Television ===
Year	Title	Role	Notes
1991	Major Dad	Marvin	Recurring role (season 2)
1991	Law & Order	Roneld Griggs	Episode: "Mushrooms"
1991–92	The Cosby Show	Stanley	Guest (season 7), recurring (season 8)
1993–94	Getting By	Marcus Dixon	Main role
1994	Sister, Sister	Joey	Episode: "Joey's Choice"
1995	Under One Roof	Marcus Henry	Main role
1995	Street Gear	Derick Davis	Main role
1995–96	Hangin' with Mr. Cooper	Calvin	Recurring role (season 4)
1996	Moesha	Ohaji	Recurring role (season 1)
1996–2002	The Steve Harvey Show	Romeo Santana	Main role
1997	NYPD Blue	Warren	Episode: "A Draining Experience"
2002	JAG	Seaman Aubrey McBride	Episode: "Port Chicago"
2002	Half & Half	Dante Aldente	Episode: "The Big Pimpin' Episode"
