= The Family Man (American TV series) =

American sitcom

- The Family Man opening title
- Genre: Sitcom
- Created by: William Bickley; Michael Warren
- Developed by: Thomas L. Miller; Robert L. Boyett
- Written by: William Bickley; Michael Warren; Martha Williamson; Brian Bird; John Steven Owen; Chuck Tately; Kevin White; Pamela Wick; Susan Cridland Wick
- Directed by: Richard Correll; Mark Linn-Baker; Judy Pioli
- Starring: Gregory Harrison; John Buchanan; Scott Weinger; Matthew Brooks; Ashleigh Blair Sterling; Al Molinaro
- Theme music composer: Jesse Frederick; Bennett Salvay
- Composers: Jesse Frederick; Bennett Salvay; Steven Chesne
- Country of origin: United States
- Original language: English
- No. of seasons: 1
- No. of episodes: 22 (1 unaired)

Production
- Executive producers: Thomas L. Miller; Robert L. Boyett; William Bickley; Michael Warren; Ross Brown
- Producers: Martha Williamson; James O'Keefe; Chuck Tately; Kevin White; Joe Fisch; Myron Lee Nash
- Camera setup: Film; Multi-camera
- Running time: 30 mins. (approx)
- Production companies: Catalina Production Group; Miller-Boyett Productions; Lorimar Television

Original release
- Network: CBS
- Release: September 11, 1990 – July 17, 1991

The Family Man is an American sitcom that aired on CBS from September 11, 1990, to July 17, 1991. The series, starring Gregory Harrison, was created by William Bickley and Michael Warren, who also served as executive producers with Thomas L. Miller and Robert L. Boyett. Martha Williamson served as supervising producer, with Ross Brown as co-executive producer. In addition to being produced by Lorimar Television and Miller-Boyett Productions, the show was also under the Catalina Television marque (Harrison's production company).

Lasting for 22 episodes, The Family Man originally aired on Saturday nights at 8 p.m. alongside the established Miller-Boyett series The Hogan Family, which had moved to CBS from NBC.

== Premise ==
The Family Man was Harrison's first television starring vehicle since his most-popular role of Dr. "Gonzo" Gates on Trapper John, M.D. in 1986, just before that series ended. Harrison assumed this series directly from Lorimar Television after playing the featured role of businessman Michael Sharpe in the ninth (final) season of the CBS drama Falcon Crest, another Lorimar show.

Harrison played Los Angeles fire captain Jack Taylor, a recent widower trying to hold his family together with inept help from his father-in-law Joe Alberghetti (Al Molinaro, also returning to series TV after many years off, and in his third Miller/Boyett sitcom). Joe's stay with the family after his daughter Teri's death was supposed to be temporary, but by the end of the pilot, after Jack and his kids showed how much they needed him in their lives, he decided to permanently move out from New York City. Jack's four children were 16-year-old Jeff (John Buchanan), headstrong and athletic; 14-year-old Steve (Scott Weinger), the resident troublemaker who was working to improve himself and his self-image; 11-year-old Brian (Matthew Brooks), who had the hardest time dealing with his mother's death; and wise-beyond-her-years 6-year-old Allison (Ashleigh Blair Sterling), who could do no wrong.

Stories focused on Jack's unique relationships with each of his children, the problems and adjustments of a suddenly-motherless household, and the misadventures and scrapes of the growing brood. Jack's high-demand job as fire captain also had prominence; his charges and best buddies at the firehouse included Gus Harbrook (Edward Winter), Eddie Cooper (Peter Parros), and the younger Ted Reinhard (Adam Biesk), who could always be counted on to shake things up. They also joined him for poker night in almost every episode. Adding some adult female perspective was the Taylors' next-door neighbor Hilary Kozak (Gail Edwards), a divorcee whose young son Patrick (Josh Byrne) was Allison's best friend. Hilary was originally a potential love interest for Jack, but it never quite happened.

Upon the show's return in June 1991, after a seven-month hiatus, firefighters Gus and Ted were dropped from the cast, leaving only Eddie regularly in evidence at Jack's poker nights as well as at the firehouse. The rest of the cast remained intact, but coming into the picture was pretty local news reporter Jill Nichols (Nancy Everhard), who first met the stolid fire captain on assignment during an interview. Sparks flew instantly and they began dating.

== Cast ==
=== Main ===
- Gregory Harrison as Jack Taylor, the widow of Teri Alberghetti
- John Buchanan as Jeff Taylor, Jack's first son
- Scott Weinger as Steve Taylor, Jack's second son
- Matthew Brooks as Brian Taylor, Jack's third son
- Ashleigh Blair Sterling as Allison Taylor, Jack's daughter
- Al Molinaro as Joe Alberghetti, Jack's father-in-law

=== Recurring ===
- Gail Edwards as Hilary Kozak, Jack's next-door neighbor later love interest
- Josh Byrne as Patrick Kozak, Hilary's son
- Edward Winter as Gus Harbrook
- Peter Parros as Eddie Cooper
- Adam Biesk as Ted Reinhard
- Nancy Everhard as Jill Nichols

== Broadcast history ==
Amidst a third-place ratings slump in spring 1990, CBS was planning a major shakeup for that fall's schedule; in dire need of youth demographics (which are attractive to advertisers, resulting in the Get Ready for CBS campaign), the network sought to occupy 5 out of 7 nights a week with an 8-9PM comedy block aimed at children and families. While already underway in greenlighting other such projects (Uncle Buck, Lenny), CBS turned to Lorimar Television, and by extension, Miller-Boyett Productions and their associates, to contribute to the rejuvenation of youth-oriented shows on the schedule. William Bickley and Michael Warren, long-time associates of Miller and Boyett who had launched Family Matters on ABC the previous year, sought out to create a new series for the CBS deal which featured with a widower raising his kids with the help of his father-in-law, as a modern-day variation of My Three Sons. Bickley and Warren gave the father three sons, but to be original to the concept, a young daughter was added to the brood, and the father was given the high-voltage career of a fire chief (which still matched the exciting career of aviation engineer for Steve Douglas of My Three Sons). The original working title was Five Alarm Family.

Miller-Boyett was having great success at ABC with their established and new programs alike (Perfect Strangers, Full House, Family Matters), resulting in blockbuster ratings on the network's TGIF lineup. The producers also had The Hogan Family running at NBC, which was nearing the end of its fifth season. Although still drawing in decent ratings, NBC decided to make room for shows with even younger demographics, and sold the series off. In April 1990, Lorimar cut a deal which moved The Hogan Family to CBS that fall, providing a companion series for CBS' new Miller-Boyett project. CBS naturally paired the two sister series on the same night (Saturday, when it was assumed families with young children would be home to watch), and given the success of back-to-back Miller-Boyett shows on ABC, optimism was high. When the new project was announced on CBS' schedule in May, it was still referred to as Five Alarm Family. Shortly after, to be further indicative of Harrison's role, Bickley and Warren changed the title to The Family Man.

The series ran 10 episodes for the first half of the season, but after the December 1, 1990 telecast, CBS put both The Family Man and its older-sister show The Hogan Family on hiatus due to low ratings. While it was determined in the intervening period that The Hogan Family had no future on its new home at CBS, the network felt willing to give The Family Man another chance. Originally, CBS was planning to return the series on a weeknight in March 1991, pairing it with the upcoming Steven Spielberg cartoon Family Dog, and collectively promoting the scheduling as "The Family Hour". Family Dog fell behind in production, however (it remained shelved before finally having a short run on CBS in the summer of 1993), causing the network to delay The Family Man as well until they could find a "protected time slot" (i.e., one preceded by a hit lead-in) for the show.

The decision was then made to bring it back in the summer, airing on both Mondays and Wednesdays at 8:30/7:30, with two new episodes airing per week. Monday episodes were to feature story lines that brought the adults of the cast to the forefront (including the new affair of Jack and Jill), while Wednesday episodes focused on the kids. With tailor-made episodes fitting both the older Monday demographics (with a Major Dad lead-in) and younger Wednesday demos (lead-in by half-hour repeats of Rescue 911), CBS was sure that The Family Man would find its audience after all. The network even went ahead and ordered 13 additional episodes to premiere mid-way through the 1991-92 season if the summer ratings climbed. The show resurfaced on the CBS schedule Monday, June 10, 1991, with twelve more episodes ahead for the summer. The ratings didn't improve with all the changes, and in mid-July, after the last completed episode aired, The Family Man was canceled. Seeing that the series was possibly heading for an eleventh hour renewal based upon its summer performance, CBS included footage of Harrison as his Family Man character Jack Taylor in promos for the 1991-92 network campaign, The Look of America. By the time they aired, both Harrison series (including True Detectives) had been canceled, but his footage remained in the fall promos.

The Family Man finished #113 out of 141 prime time shows for the 1990–91 season Nielsen rankings.

== Theme music and presentation ==
The series' theme music was composed by Miller-Boyett mainstay artists Jesse Frederick and Bennett Salvay. Unlike their works on most other shows from Miller-Boyett, The Family Man's theme was instrumental. It did, however, maintain the uplifting, inspirational sound that was prevalent on its sister programs; this was complete with scenes of the cast frolicking, having fun and working around the sunny Los Angeles setting of the show, and the signature sweeping aerial pullbacks.

== Episodes ==
Every episode of The Family Man is listed in production code order.

No.	Title	Directed by	Written by	Original release date	Viewers (millions)
1	"Pilot"	Richard Correll	William Bickley & Michael Warren	September 11, 1990	14.4
2	"Family Day"	Rich Correll	Julia Newton	September 15, 1990	10.2
3	"Making Babies"	Unknown	Unknown	September 22, 1990	12.1
4	"Roommates"	Unknown	Unknown	September 29, 1990	10.6
5	"Tea for Two"	Unknown	Unknown	October 13, 1990	8.4
6	"Drive My Car"	Unknown	Unknown	October 27, 1990	8.5
7	"The New Guy"	Judy Pioli	Matt Ember	November 17, 1990	10.1
8	"Torn Between Two Brothers"	Judy Pioli	Pamela Wick & Susan Cridland Wick	November 3, 1990	9.2
9	"Fire Break"	Judy Pioli	Geoff Gordon	November 10, 1990	10.3
10	"The Coach"	James O'Keefe	Brian Bird & John Wierick	December 1, 1990	8.1
11	"My Little Runaway"	Rich Correll	Martha Williamson	June 12, 1991	7.9
12	"Throw Momma from the House"	Mark Linn-Baker	Julia Newton	July 8, 1991	14.7
13	"Trading Places"	James O'Keefe	Chuck Tately & Kevin White	June 19, 1991	9.8
14	"You Bet Your Life"	Unknown	Unknown	June 26, 1991	7.7
15	"Double Date"	James O'Keefe	Pamela Wick & Susan Cridland Wick	June 10, 1991	13.0
16	"Take My Dad, Please"	N/A	N/A	Unaired	N/A
17	"Jack and Jill: Part 1"	James O'Keefe	Martha Williamson	June 17, 1991	13.2
18	"Jack and Jill: Part 2"	James O'Keefe	Julia Newton	June 24, 1991	12.9
19	"Father Figure"	Tom Rickard	Chuck Tately & Kevin White	July 10, 1991	8.1
20	"The Boss's Daughter"	Unknown	Unknown	July 17, 1991	6.9
21	"A Tiny Advantage"	Scott Baio	Matt Ember	July 3, 1991	7.2
22	"Scenes from a Marriage"	James O'Keefe	Susan Sebastian & Diana Ayers	July 1, 1991	12.3

== Awards and nominations ==
Year	Award	Result	Category	Recipient
1991	Young Artist Awards	Nominated	Exceptional Performance by a Young Actress Under Nine	Ashleigh Sterling
1991	Young Artist Awards	Nominated	Best Young Actor Starring in a New Television Series	Scott Weinger
1992	Young Artist Awards	Nominated	Best Young Actor Starring in a Television Series	Scott Weinger
