= Going Places (American TV series) =

American sitcom

- Genre: Sitcom
- Created by: Robert Griffard; Howard Adler
- Developed by: Thomas L. Miller; Robert L. Boyett
- Starring: Alan Ruck; Heather Locklear; Hallie Todd; Holland Taylor; Staci Keanan; Jerry Levine; Philip Charles MacKenzie; Steve Vinovich; J.D. Daniels
- Theme music composer: Jesse Frederick; Bennett Salvay
- Opening theme: "Going Places", performed by Mark Lennon
- Composers: Jesse Frederick; Bennett Salvay
- Country of origin: United States
- Original language: English
- No. of seasons: 1
- No. of episodes: 19

Production
- Executive producers: Howard Adler; Robert Griffard; Thomas L. Miller; Robert L. Boyett
- Producers: Deborah Oppenheimer; Ronny Hallin (pilot only); James O'Keefe (pilot only); Shari Hearn (episodes 13–19); Myron Nash
- Camera setup: Film; Multi-camera
- Running time: 22–24 minutes
- Production companies: Miller-Boyett Productions; Lorimar Television

Original release
- Network: ABC
- Release: September 21, 1990 – March 8, 1991

Going Places is an American television sitcom that aired on ABC from September 21, 1990, to March 8, 1991. The series stars Alan Ruck, Jerry Levine, Heather Locklear, and Hallie Todd as four young Hollywood writers renting a house together. It aired as part of the TGIF block. The series was created and executive produced by Robert Griffard and Howard Adler, and developed and executive produced by Thomas L. Miller and Robert L. Boyett for Miller-Boyett Productions, in association with Lorimar Television.

== Cast ==
- Alan Ruck as Charlie Davis, the leader of Four Writers
- Heather Locklear as Alexandra "Alex" Burton, the member of Four Writers
- Hallie Todd as Kate Griffin, the member of Four Writers
- Holland Taylor as Dawn St. Claire, producer for the hidden camera television show Here's Looking at You (Episodes 13)
- Philip Charles MacKenzie as Arnie Ross, Dick Roberts' producer (Episodes 3)
- Steve Vinovich as Dick Roberts, a daytime talk show host (Episodes 5)
- Staci Keanan as Lindsay Bowen, a teenager who lives next door to the Four Writers
- J.D. Daniels as Nick Griffin, Kate's nephew (Episodes 6)
- Jerry Levine as Jack Davis, Charlie's younger brother and the co-leader of Four Writers

== Episodes ==
No.	Title	Directed by	Written by	Original release date	Prod. code	US viewers (millions)
1	"Welcome to L.A."	Joel Zwick	Robert Griffard & Howard Adler	September 21, 1990	446501	19.7
In the pilot, four young writers—brothers Charlie and Jack Davis, Alex Burton, and Kate Griffin—land jobs in Hollywood at the hidden-camera television show Here's Looking at You. The foursome ends up renting a house together from their show's executive producer Dawn St. Claire. Guest starring: Michael Rapposelli as Bruno Dobson, Michael Landers as Cop and Marianne Muellerleile as Woman
2	"Born to Be Mild"	Richard Correll	Rob Bragin	September 28, 1990	446502	16.1
Charlie falls in love with Brie, an attractive new secretary at the production office of Here's Looking at You. Brie fails to notice Charlie until she sees him driving an expensive Porsche. Heeding his co-workers' advice, Charlie confesses that the Porsche is only a rental, and Brie walks out on him. They use the situation as the basis for a hidden-camera stunt on the show. Guest starring: Lisa Fuller as Brie, Michael Holt as Rolf and Ken Thorley as Victim
3	"Another Saturday Night"	Richard Correll	Robert Griffard & Howard Adler	October 5, 1990	446504	15.1
Charlie and Kate spend their Saturday nights playing Monopoly, so Jack and Alex encourage them to place personal ads to pep up their social lives. When Charlie meets his date at the restaurant, he discovers that it's Kate. They get a good laugh out of the awkward situation... and decide to go home and play Monopoly. Guest starring: Nancy Reed, Doug Dale, and Ron Fassler
4	"Clean Sweep"	Richard Correll	Robert Blair	October 12, 1990	446505	17.0
Charlie, Alex, Kate, and Jack develop "writer's block" trying to come up with a good idea for a practical joke for the show. When they finally come up with a great idea, they find that the producer of a rival hidden-camera show is featuring the same idea they had. Everyone suspects one another of selling the idea, until they learn their maid is really an actress that was hired to spy on them. Guest starring: Bruce Jarchow as Peterson, Aaron Lustig as Gary, and Kathryn Marcopulous as Pennie
5	"Married to the Mob"	Richard Correll	Alan Eisenstock & Larry Mintz	October 26, 1990	446506	17.1
Charlie fears for his life when he finds out that his blind date Donna is the wife of accused mobster Joey "The Icepick" Montaine. Donna leaves Joey and Charlie's roommates to try to rekindle the romance between her and her husband. Guest starring: Susan Diol as Donna Montaine, Tom La Grua as Joey "The Icepick" Montaine, and Sherry Hursey as Michelle
6	"Sex, Lies and Videotape"	Mark Linn-Baker	Rob Bragin	November 2, 1990	446507	15.7
Charlie, Alex, Kate, and Jack stay up late to tape some new ideas for Here's Looking at You and start doing exaggerated, unflattering impressions of Dawn. When a messenger takes the tape, the quartet sneaks into her house to try to get it back before she finds out, but she comes home before they can. The next day, Dawn apologizes to the group for recording over their tape without watching it first. Guest starring: Craig Branham as Ronald
7	"Queen of Comedy"	Stewart A. Lyons	Maiya Williams	November 9, 1990	446508	16.7
Kate's roommates worry when she starts falling asleep during meetings. They discover that she's moonlighting as a stand-up comic at a local club every night. When they see her routine, Charlie gets offended by her description of him and they fight. After an incident at an ATM, Charlie apologizes for his behavior and offers to write her some material. Guest starring: Marty Schiff and Cleto Augusto
8	"Thanksgiving Show" "The Bird's the Word"	Lee Shallat	Sheree Guitar	November 16, 1990	446509	17.6
When a blizzard strands the roommates on Thanksgiving, everyone decides to pitch in to give Alex the big Thanksgiving dinner of her dreams.
9	"I Was a Teenage Bride"	Lee Shallat	Alan Eisenstock & Larry Mintz	November 23, 1990	446510	16.6
When Charlie and Jack's 18-year-old brother visits from Chicago after breaking up with his girlfriend, he becomes infatuated with Lindsay. They decide to elope in Las Vegas and the roommates pursue them when they find out. Guest starring: Jonathan Ward as Jay Davis, Peter M. Wilcox as Rev. King, and Bonnie Urseth as Clerk
10	"Who's the Boss?"	Jack Shea	Alan Eisenstock & Larry Mintz	November 30, 1990	446503	17.6
Jack is appointed as the new head writer of Here's Looking at You, annoying his friends when his new position goes right to his head. Charlie, Alex, and Kate conspire with Dawn to help teach Jack a lesson. Guest starring: Jeff Nowinski, Darlene Kardon, and Patrick Cronin
11	"Curse of the Video"	John Pasquin	Robert Griffard & Howard Adler	December 7, 1990	446511	17.4
During the taping of a Here's Looking at You segment about superstition, Jack ridicules a professed witch, who puts a 5-part curse on him. As each part of the curse comes true, Charlie invites a psychic to the house to try to lift it. Guest starring: Belita Moreno as Madame Pushnik, John Durbin as Death, and Christine Healy as Woman
12	"Feud Poisoning"	Lee Shallat	Robert Blair	January 4, 1991	446512	18.1
After the roommates agree to a truce following a massive practical-joke war, Alex and Kate find a burglar in the living room and think it's Charlie and Jack's final prank and treat the man like a guest. When Charlie and Jack come home, they tell the girls it's a real burglar, and the four hold him until the police arrive. Guest starring: Tom Kindle as Policeman, John Fleck as Burglar, and Andrea Walters as Reporter
13	"The New Job"	Richard Correll	Alan Eisenstock & Larry Mintz	January 11, 1991	446513	21.1
The network cancels Here's Looking At You, leaving the roommates to seek new jobs. They become writers of a new daytime talk show hosted by the obnoxious Dick Roberts. The show's first guest is investigative author Jerry Slaughter, whom they lose moments before he is supposed to appear, so Charlie decides to take his place. The ruse backfires when the real Jerry Slaughter appears during the interview. The roommates, fearing they'll be fired, are surprised to receive praise for their ingenuity, and they keep their jobs. Guest starring: Christopher Gartin as Mortie Gallup, David Groh as Jerry Slaughter, Grant Moran as Announcer, and Judd Laurance as Floor Manager Note: Holland Taylor (Dawn St. Claire) makes her last appearance on the series; Steve Vinovich and Philip Charles MacKenzie join the cast as Dick Roberts and Arnie Ross, respectively.
14	"New Kid on the Block" "New Kid in Town"	Richard Correll	Robert Griffard & Howard Adler	January 18, 1991	446514	17.0
Kate's brother sends his son, troublesome 8-year-old Nick, to visit her, then leaves a message that he's too busy to return for his son, and Kate and her roommates suddenly become unlikely full-time parents. Guest starring: Ralph Bruneau as Michael, Sav Farrow as Nigel, and I.M. Hobson as Mr. Garber. Note: J.D. Daniels makes his first appearance in the role of Nick Griffin.
15	"Room to Move"	Lee Shallat	Rob Bragin	February 1, 1991	446515	19.0
With Kate's nephew Nick now living with them, the new living situation severely cramps the roommates' carefree lifestyle, so Kate figures they're better off elsewhere and rents a dreary apartment. When they start to miss her, Charlie, Alex, and Jack decide to convert the attic into a bedroom for Nick so they'll move back into the beach house. Guest starring: Kristen Cloke as Krysten Absent: Philip Charles MacKenzie as Arnie Ross and Steve Vinovich as Dick Roberts
16	"Don't Go Changing"	Richard Correll	Maiya Williams	February 8, 1991	446516	21.5
Kate, Charlie, Alex, and Jack agree to babysit Dick's nerdy son Sam, but are unprepared for the hypochondriacal boy who arrives with a virtual pharmacy in his suitcase. Nick decides to turn the overprotected Sam into a regular kid by taking him out skateboarding. Sam breaks his leg, but he is happy because for the first time in his life he feels like a regular kid. Guest starring: Christopher Castile as Sam Roberts, Eric Freeman, Bernadette Bowman, and Mary Portser Note: Christopher Castile makes his first appearance in the role of Sam Roberts; Castile and series regular Staci Keanan (Lindsay Bowen) would later co-star in another Miller-Boyett-produced series Step by Step the following season. Absent: Philip Charles MacKenzie as Arnie Ross
17	"Take My Girlfriend, Please"	Lee Shallat	Shari Hearn	February 15, 1991	446517	22.0
Jack's ex-girlfriend Wendy visits and insists that Charlie escort her around town; Charlie is thrilled when he meets the now-attractive Wendy, irritating his brother. In the end, Jack decides to put aside his ego for once and be glad Charlie's having a good time. Meanwhile, Sam is caught hiding Nick's cheat-sheets during a test and earns his respect by not using them. Guest starring: Christopher Castile as Sam Roberts, Edward Edwards as George Farrell, Margot Rose as Mrs. Umstead, and Darlene Vogel as Wendy Spencer Absent: Philip Charles MacKenzie as Arnie Ross and Steve Vinovich as Dick Roberts
18	"Mommy Dearest"	Lee Shallat	Robert Griffard & Howard Adler	February 22, 1991	446518	15.3
Nick is excited to see his favorite band in concert; Kate promised that she would take him, but ends up breaking that promise when she finds out that everyone must camp out in line overnight to get tickets, so Nick sneaks out of the house to get tickets himself. Kate, Alex, Charlie, and Jack go to bring Nick back home, but decide to stay in line and camp out for the night while they're there. Guest starring: Christopher Castile as Sam Roberts, Dena Dietrich as Claire Griffin, and Brett Miller as Brett Absent: Philip Charles MacKenzie as Arnie Ross
19	"The Camping Show"	Lee Shallat	Alan Eisenstock & Larry Mintz	March 8, 1991	446519	20.6
Jack and Charlie take Nick and Sam's nature scout group on a camping weekend, but their inexperience with the nature scouts causes them to end up lost in the wilderness. Nick stands up for Sam after the boys in the scout group tease Sam for being a nerd. But Sam's intelligence saves them, as he leads the boys to civilization. Meanwhile, Arnie comes to the rescue of Alex, Kate and Lindsay when they become trapped in the exercise equipment that they were assembling as a surprise for Charlie. Guest starring: Christopher Castile as Sam Roberts, Rider Strong as David, Chris Babers as Joe, Jacob Kenner as Max Stone and Holly Gagnier as Pam Stone

== Broadcast and ratings ==
Going Places premiered on September 21, 1990, as the end of ABC's newly successful TGIF lineup, in the Friday 9:30/8:30c slot (#41). The series was officially canceled in May 1991. The series returned on May 31, 1991, for six weeks of summer reruns (most of the episodes aired after the concept and character revamp). The last episode aired on July 5, 1991.

As of 2025, the rights to the series are currently held by WBTV.

== Bibliography ==
- Tim Brooks and Earle Marsh, The Complete Directory to Prime Time Network and Cable TV Shows 1946–Present, Ninth edition (New York: Ballantine Books, 2007) ISBN 978-0-345-49773-4
