= Sally Wheeler =

American stage and television actress

- Born: Winter Haven, Florida, U.S.
- Education: Queens University of Charlotte; University of Florida; Florida State University
- Occupations: Stage and television actress
- Spouse: William Christopher Maier (m. 1999)

Sally Wheeler Maier is an American stage and television actress. She is best known for playing Carrie Moore in the American sitcom television series Two of a Kind.

== Early life ==
Wheeler is a native of Winter Haven, Florida, the daughter of Irving, a lawyer, and Carolyn Wheeler, a singer, and has three brothers. She first acted on stage at the age of nine. She graduated from Winter Haven High School, and later attended Queens University of Charlotte in Charlotte, North Carolina. She also attended the University of Florida in Gainesville, Florida, earning her master's degree in drama and English, as well as earning her doctorate's degree from Florida State University in Tallahassee, Florida.

== Career ==
Wheeler began her acting career in New York, appearing in three commercials, an Off-Broadway play, and a play titled Gypsy. In 1998, she starred in the ABC sitcom television series Two of a Kind, playing Carrie Moore, a college student who was the babysitter of Mary-Kate and Ashley (Mary-Kate Olsen and Ashley Olsen).

After the series ended in 1999, Wheeler guest-starred in the ABC sitcom television series Spin City. She appeared in the soap operas Another World, As the World Turns (as Wendy) and Guiding Light. She also appeared on stage in Detective Story, Fiddler on the Roof, and As You Like It. She performed at the Worth Street Theater Company, where she co-starred in the play In the Forest of Arden, playing Rosalind. In 2008, she appeared in the NBC comedy-drama television series Lipstick Jungle, and in 2013, she appeared in the CBS police procedural television series Blue Bloods.

Wheeler's company, Friend of a Friend Productions, produces narrative and documentary films.

== Other activities ==
Wheeler is on the board of trustees at Queens University and is on the board of Wheeler Farms, Wheeler Companies, Boston Mining and Preservation of Natural Florida.

== Personal life ==
On January 2, 1999, Wheeler married investment banker William Christopher Maier in Winter Haven, Florida. They have two sons. She ranks nationally in amateur Arabian horse competition.
