= Deon Richmond =

American actor

- Born: June 2, 1978 (age 47); New York City, New York, U.S.
- Occupation: Actor
- Years active: 1986–present
- Known for: Kenny ("Buuud") –The Cosby Show; Jordan Bennett – Sister, Sister; Darren Dixon – Getting By

Deon Richmond (born June 2, 1978) is an American actor, who is best known for his recurring roles as Rudy Huxtable's friend Kenny (nicknamed "Buuud") on the NBC sitcom The Cosby Show and Jordan Bennett on the ABC/The WB sitcom Sister, Sister. He has been nominated for two Young Artist Awards, winning one in 1989.

== Career ==
He is the son of Shirley Richmond. His earliest roles include an appearance in the music video for the 1985 Kool & the Gang song "Cherish" and commercials for fast food chains Burger King and McDonald's.

In 1986, Richmond made his debut as Kenny, also known by the alias Buuud, on sitcom The Cosby Show. He made his first appearance in the episode "Theo's Flight", and after appearing occasionally during season 3 Richmond was promoted to a recurring role the following season. Alongside the other child actors on the series, he won the Young Artist Award for Best Young Ensemble Performance in 1989. Richmond would go on to appear in 32 episodes of the show until it ended in 1992.

Richmond played a young Eddie Murphy in the beginning scenes of the film Eddie Murphy Raw (1987), appeared in the film Enemy Territory as Chet and had a small role in the Spike Lee film Mo' Better Blues. He portrayed a young drug dealer in the 1988 TV movie The Child Saver co-starring Alfre Woodard, and appeared in the Kris Kross music video "Warm It Up" in 1992.

He played Darren Dixon in the 1993–94 sitcom Getting By with Merlin Santana as his brother Marcus; they had previously appeared together on The Cosby Show. In 1997, Richmond began his role as Tamera Campbell's boyfriend Jordan Bennett on the fifth season of the hit series Sister, Sister, and became a regular cast member during its sixth and final season. While acting on Sister, Sister, he earned his second Young Artist Award nomination in 1999.

Richmond starred in Trippin' (1999) as Gregory Reed, a high school senior who tends to daydream instead of focusing on his life. One reviewer claimed Richmond was "great" in the role. In an otherwise negative review, another critic viewed Richmond as "appealing" and that he "worked well" with co-star Maia Campbell.

During the 2000s, Richmond appeared in several films throughout the decade. In Scream 3 (2000), he played Tyson, who is later slain in the film. The following year, Richmond portrayed Malik, a character meant to satirize tokenism, in Not Another Teen Movie. Richmond was Mini Cochran in the 2002 film National Lampoon's Van Wilder, and appeared as Marcus in the independent horror film Hatchet (2007). Richmond portrayed teacher Calvin Babbitt in the short-lived 2006 sitcom Teachers.

Richmond acted less frequently in the 2010s. He guest starred in the series finale of Psych in 2014, portraying the boss of Gus. Richmond also appeared in the comedy film FDR: American Badass! (2012) as George.

== Filmography ==
=== Film ===
Year	Title	Role
1987	Eddie Murphy Raw	Young Eddie Murphy
1987	Enemy Territory	Chet
1990	Mo' Better Blues	Tyrone
1998	High Freakquency	Coffee Boy
1999	Trippin'	Gregory Reed
2000	Scream 3	Tyson Fox
2001	Not Another Teen Movie	Malik
2002	National Lampoon's Van Wilder	Mini Cochran
2003	The Blues	Shorty
2005	One More Round	Celebrity Audience Member 1
2006	Bickford Shmeckler's Cool Ideas	Red
2006	Hatchet	Marcus
2011	Poolboy: Drowning Out the Fury	Jimmy Fontaine
2011	The Legend of Awesomest Maximus	Jamal
2012	FDR: American Badass!	George
2018	What Matters	Black
2022	Cloudy with a Chance of Christmas	Eddie Lawson

=== Television ===
Year	Title	Role	Notes
1986–92	The Cosby Show	Kenny (also nicknamed "Bud")	32 episodes, (NBC)
1988	The Child Saver	Jackie Watson	TV movie, (TCM)
1989	Desperado: The Outlaw Wars	Thomas Jefferson III	TV movie, (TCM)
1992	Moe's World	Moe	TV movie
1993	American Playhouse	Nat Crawford	Season 11 Episode 5, Hallelujah (PBS)
1993–94	Getting By	Darren Dixon	31 episodes, (ABC/NBC)
1994	Me and the Boys	T.C.	Season 1 episodes 9, Bad Influence (ABC)
1995	The Parent 'Hood	Troy	Season 1 Episode 2, The Rake, the fake and Gopher Snake (WB)
1995	On Our Own	Kevin	Two Episodes, (ABC)
1995	Hangin' With Mr. Cooper	Lewis	Season 4 Episode 3, R.O.T.C. (ABC)
1996	Hangin' With Mr. Cooper	Louis	Season 4 Episode 14, Coach Counselor (ABC)
1997-99	Sister, Sister	Jordan Bennett	34 episodes, (WB)
2006	Teachers	Calvin Babbitt	Five Episodes, (NBC)
2007	It's a Mall World	Evan	TV mini-series, (MTV)
2014	Psych	Gus's New Boss	Season 8 Episode 10, "The Breakup" (USA)
2014	One Love	Chris Benson	2 episodes
2019	That Show Called Arif	Deon Richmond	Episode: "The Incident"
