= On Our Own (1994 TV series) =

American sitcom

- Genre: Sitcom
- Created by: David W. Duclon
- Developed by: Thomas L. Miller; Robert L. Boyett
- Starring: Ralph Louis Harris; JoJo Smollett; Jazz Smollett; Jussie Smollett; T'Keyah Crystal Keymáh; Jurnee Smollett; Jake Smollett; Jocqui Smollett; Roger Aaron Brown; Kimberley Kates
- Theme music composer: Jesse Frederick; Bennett Salvay
- Opening theme: "Love, Tried and True" performed by Joe Turano
- Composers: Jesse Frederick; Bennett Salvay
- Country of origin: United States
- Original language: English
- No. of seasons: 1
- No. of episodes: 20

Production
- Executive producers: David W. Duclon; Thomas L. Miller; Robert L. Boyett; Suzanne de Passe; Suzanne Coston; Ralph Louis Harris
- Camera setup: Multi-camera
- Running time: 22 minutes
- Production companies: Lightkeeper Productions de Passe Entertainment; Miller-Boyett Productions; Warner Bros. Television

Original release
- Network: ABC
- Release: September 13, 1994 – April 14, 1995

On Our Own is an American sitcom that aired on ABC from September 13, 1994, until April 14, 1995. The series stars Ralph Louis Harris and six real life siblings: Jazz, Jocqui, Jake, JoJo, Jurnee, and Jussie Smollett.

The series was created and executive produced by David W. Duclon, one of the executive producers of Family Matters. The series was also produced by Thomas L. Miller and Robert L. Boyett, who developed the show. Suzanne de Passe (who also executive produced Sister, Sister and later Smart Guy) and Suzanne Coston were additional executive producers, with Duclon's longtime colleague Gary Menteer acting as co-executive producer (who also was a producer/writer on Family Matters, to which he returned when On Our Own was canceled).

The series was produced by Miller-Boyett Productions, with associates Lightkeeper Productions (Duclon's company) and de Passe Entertainment. On Our Own was the first Miller-Boyett sitcom to be produced by Warner Bros. Television for its entire run.

== Synopsis ==
The series centers on the Jerrico family, consisting of seven brothers and sisters in the O'Fallon Park neighborhood of St. Louis. Six months prior to the series, a car crash killed both their parents. Since then, they have been raised by the eldest brother, Josh (Harris). Having aired on Sunday nights at 7:30/6:30c during the first half of the season, On Our Own was moved to the 9:30/8:30c time slot following Step by Step on TGIF when it returned in March 1995. The changes to the series in the spring did not help ratings; and after six more episodes, ABC cancelled the show.

== Cast ==
Cast of On Our Own

=== Main ===
- Ralph Louis Harris as Josh Jerrico/Aunt Jelcinda ("Mama J")
- JoJo Smollett as Jimi Jerrico
- Jazz Smollett as Jai Jerrico
- Jussie Smollett as Jesse Jerrico
- Jurnee Smollett as Jordee Jerrico
- Jake Smollett as Joc Jerrico
- Jocqui Smollett as Jarreau Jerrico
- Roger Aaron Brown as Mr. Gordon Ormsby (1994)
- Kimberley Kates as Alana Michaels (1994)
- Rae'Ven Larrymore Kelly as Hannah (pilot only)
- T'Keyah Crystal Keymáh as Scotti Decker (1995)
- Karen Kim as Suki (1995)
- Laura Ponce as Nails (1995)

=== Recurring ===
- Cindy Herron as Shannon
- Deon Richmond as Kevin
- Bumper Robinson as Nat

== Episodes ==
No.	Title	Directed by	Written by	Original release date	Prod. code	Viewers (millions)
1	"Pilot"	Joel Zwick	David W. Duclon	September 13, 1994	475082	17.3
After their parents die in an automobile accident, twenty-year-old Josh takes over as the authority figure of his six younger siblings. But the by-the-rules head of Department of Children Services, Gordon Ormsby, hears of the Jerricos' case and sends new social worker Alana Michaels to investigate and, if accurate, prepare for foster care. Josh assumes the identity of "Aunt Jelcinda" to combat the authorities.
2	"Last Tango in St. Louis" "Dog Day After Groom"	John Tracy	Fred Rubin	September 18, 1994	456301	11.8
Josh has a problem: Gordon asks "Aunt Jelcinda" for a date, and he cannot refuse if he wants the family to stay together.
3	"Matchmaker Mama"	John Tracy	Unknown	September 25, 1994	456303	14.6
"Aunt Jelcinda" finds a distraught young woman in a restaurant ladies' room and sets her up with her alter ego, Josh. She eventually becomes his girlfriend.
4	"A Matter of Principal"	John Tracy	David Chambers	October 2, 1994	456302	12.3
When Jesse is unjustly suspended from school for fighting, Jimi poses as Jesse's grandfather for a meeting with the principal.
5	"Nok 'Til You Drop"	Joel Zwick	Ralph Greene	October 9, 1994	456304	12.8
Jimi loses money he doesn't have to a con man on a game of Nok-Hockey. Meanwhile, Jai readies for her first dance.
6	"Swiss Family Jerrico's"	Joel Zwick	Michael Din	October 16, 1994	456305	11.6
Josh thinks a camping trip will provide relief from his impersonation, but Gordon tags along.
7	"Bargain Basement"	Richard Correll	Unknown	October 23, 1994	456307	15.2
The Jerricos discover a trunk full of memories of their parents – and Alana too may soon be a memory, since Gordon wants to take her off their case.
8	"Bonnie is Really Clyde"	John Tracy	Gregory Thomas Garcia	October 30, 1994	456306	11.5
"Aunt Jelcinda" befriends a runaway teen while Joc threatens to do so.
9	"A Family Affair"	Joel Zwick	Lore Kimbrough	November 13, 1994	456308	15.9
Josh is getting serious about his new girlfriend. "The trouble is," sighs Jimi, "if a girl gets serious with Josh, she gets a free six-pack of assorted Jerricos."
10	"Baby Blues"	Richard Correll	Lore Kimbrough	December 4, 1994	456310	14.1
The kids try to raise money for tickets to a Whitney Houston concert, with mixed success. Meanwhile, Josh gets stuck in an elevator with a very pregnant woman.
11	"That's My Car and I'm Sticking to It"	Richard Correll	Timothy Stack	December 11, 1994	456311	12.7
Neighborhood gossip gets the Jerricos investigated.
12	"All I Want for Christmas"	Richard Correll	David W. Duclon & Gary Menteer	December 18, 1994	456312	12.4
When a kindergarten bully tells Joc that Santa Claus doesn't exist, Josh dons a Santa suit to prove the bully wrong – and succeeds only too well.
13	"Parents' Night"	Joel Zwick	David Chambers	December 28, 1994	456309	16.3
Josh can not attend parents' night at Jordee's school because he has to finish an article.
14	"The Boarder"	Kelly Sandefur	Fred Rubin	March 3, 1995	456313	19.1
Josh wins custody of the kids, and the family takes in a boarder: live-in contractor Scotti.
15	"Obstacle Illusion"	Joel Zwick	David Chambers	March 10, 1995	456314	17.3
Jordee gets into remote-control cars. Meanwhile, Jimi is shot down by a girl who admits she is a jinx and proves it.
16	"He Ain't Heavy, He's My Brother"	Joel Zwick	Lore Kimbrough	March 17, 1995	456316	17.8
While poking around in the attic, Josh discovers love letters to his mom from his dad – who was not the father of his siblings.
17	"Girl Talk"	Kelly Sandefur	Gregory Thomas Garcia & Ralph Greene	March 24, 1995	456317	17.4
A football star eyes Jai, who wants a particular shy boy to ask her out. Meanwhile, Josh gets in trouble with his girlfriend because of Scotti.
18	"Little Rascals"	Kelly Sandefur	Michael Din & Timothy Stack	March 31, 1995	456319	17.8
Josh, a cracker-jack coffee shop manager, has a crisis to manage: his staff has the flu. Enter the replacement staff: his siblings and Scotti.
19	"The Easy Way"	Kelly Sandefur	David Chambers & Fred Rubin	April 7, 1995	456318	16.8
Jordee takes the easy way out of a geography exam: she cheats. And a girl with a "bad rep" has her eye on Jimi.
20	"The Tonsil Tale"	Joel Zwick	Fred Fox, Jr. & Jim Geoghan	April 14, 1995	456315	15.4
Joc needs a doc – "Someone pulled a Christmas tree from my throat" – so it's tonsillectomy time for the first-grader. Meanwhile, Jesse takes up hypnosis.

== Syndication ==
The series was briefly re-aired on TV One in 2007.

== Award nominations ==
Year	Award	Result	Category	Recipient
1995	Young Artist Awards	Best Performance by an Actor Under Ten in a TV Series	Jake Smollett	Nominated
1995	Young Artist Awards	Best Performance by an Actress Under Ten in a TV Series	Jurnee Smollett	Nominated
