= Frank Coombs (American football) =

American football and basketball coach

Coaching career (HC unless noted)

Football
- 1914: Adrian

Basketball
- 1914–1915: Adrian

Head coaching record
- Overall: 3–3 (football); 3–10 (basketball)

Frank Coombs was an American football and basketball coach. He was the head football coach at Adrian College in Adrian, Michigan for one season, in 1914, compiling a record of 3–3. Coombs was also the head basketball coach at Adrian in 1914–15, tallying a mark of 3–10.

== Head coaching record ==
=== Football ===
Year	Team	Overall	Conference	Standing	Bowl/playoffs
Adrian Bulldogs (Michigan Intercollegiate Athletic Association) (1914)
1914	Adrian	3–3	0–1	5th	
Adrian:		3–3	0–1		
Total:		3–3			
