= Theodore Boyett =

American football coach

Biographical details
- Born: August 2, 1912; Missouri, U.S.
- Died: August 17, 1987 (aged 75); Santa Clara County, California, U.S.

Coaching career (HC unless noted)
- 1951–1952: Adrian

Head coaching record
- Overall: 3–11–1

Theodore Roosevelt Boyett (August 2, 1912 – August 17, 1987) was an American football coach. Boyett was the head football coach at Adrian College in Adrian, Michigan. He held that position for the 1951 and 1952 seasons. His coaching record at Adrian was 3–11–1. He was a graduate of the University of New Mexico (late 1930s) and University of Missouri.

== Head coaching record ==
Year	Team	Overall	Conference	Standing	Bowl/playoffs
Adrian Bulldogs (Michigan Intercollegiate Athletic Association) (1951–1952)
1951	Adrian	0–6	0–5	6th	
1952	Adrian	3–5–1	1–4	T–5th	
Adrian:		3–11–1	1–9		
Total:		3–11–1			
