= Getting By =

American sitcom

- Genre: Family sitcom
- Created by: William Bickley; Michael Warren
- Developed by: Thomas L. Miller; Robert L. Boyett
- Starring: Cindy Williams; Telma Hopkins; Deon Richmond; Merlin Santana; Nicki Vannice; Ashleigh Blair Sterling
- Theme music composer: Jesse Frederick; Bennett Salvay
- Composers: Jesse Frederick; Bennett Salvay; Steven Chesne; Gary Boren
- Country of origin: United States
- Original language: English
- No. of seasons: 2
- No. of episodes: 31

Production
- Executive producers: William Bickley; Michael Warren; Thomas L. Miller; Robert L. Boyett; Ken Cinnamon; Karen Wengrod; Phil Doran
- Camera setup: Film; Multi-camera
- Running time: 22–24 minutes
- Production companies: Bickley-Warren Productions; Miller-Boyett Productions; Lorimar Television (1993) (season 1); Warner Bros. Television (1993-1994) (season 2)

Original release
- Network: ABC
- Release: March 5 – May 21, 1993
- Network: NBC
- Release: September 21, 1993 – June 18, 1994

Getting By is an American television sitcom that aired on ABC from March 5 until May 21, 1993, and on NBC from September 21, 1993, until June 18, 1994. The series was created by William Bickley and Michael Warren, who also served as executive producers with Thomas L. Miller and Robert L. Boyett. The final Miller-Boyett series to begin its run under parent studio Lorimar Television, Getting By was folded into Warner Bros. Television for its second season, following Warner Bros.' absorption of Lorimar.

The series was a part of ABC's TGIF lineup in its first season before switching to NBC for the second and final season.

== Synopsis ==
The show was about two best friends and single mothers, one white and one black, who decide to split the mortgage on a new home in suburban Oak Park, Illinois and live there with their respective families. The women, widowed Dolores Dixon (Telma Hopkins) and Cathy Hale (Cindy Williams), whose husband ran off with another woman, were also co-workers, as they were employed as social workers for the Chicago Department of Social Services. Dolores had two sons, Marcus (Merlin Santana) and Darren (Deon Richmond). Cathy had two daughters, Nikki (Nicki Vannice) and Julie (Ashleigh Blair Sterling).

== Episodes ==
Cast

=== Series overview ===
Season	Episodes	Originally released		
Season	Episodes	First released	Last released	Network
1	12	March 5, 1993	May 21, 1993	ABC
2	19	September 21, 1993	June 18, 1994	NBC

=== Season 1 (1993) ===
No. overall	No. in season	Title	Directed by	Written by	Original release date	Prod. code	Viewers (millions)
1	1	"Moving In"	Richard Correll	William Bickley & Michael Warren	March 5, 1993	455251	21.7
2	2	"Men Don't Dance"	Judy Askins	Phil Doran	March 12, 1993	455257	20.9
3	3	"Back to Nature"	Joel Zwick	Mark Fink	March 19, 1993	455261	19.9
4	4	"A Little Romance"	Judy Askins	Barry O'Brien & Cheryl Alu	March 26, 1993	455258	19.0
5	5	"The Suit"	Richard Correll	Karen Wengrod & Ken Cinnamon	April 2, 1993	455252	19.2
6	6	"Shop 'till You Drop"	Judy Askins	Barry O'Brien & Cheryl Alu	April 9, 1993	455256	16.4
7	7	"My Brother's Keeper"	Judy Askins	Linda & Michael Teverbaugh	April 16, 1993	455259	18.2
8	8	"The Gospel Truth"	Judy Askins	Mike Teverbaugh & Linda Teverbaugh	April 23, 1993	455255	16.9
9	9	"Give Peace a Chance"	Joel Zwick	Gene Braunstein	April 30, 1993	455260	17.6
10	10	"The Love Connection"	Joel Zwick	Scott Spencer Gorden	May 7, 1993	455262	15.8
11	11	"We Are Family, Not"	Joel Zwick	Phil Doran	May 14, 1993	455254	13.7
12	12	"Anatomy of a Flight"	Joel Zwick	Cheryl Alu & Barry O'Brien	May 21, 1993	455253	15.6

=== Season 2 (1993–94) ===
No. overall	No. in season	Title	Directed by	Written by	Original release date	Prod. code	Viewers (millions)
13	1	"Turnabout Dance"	Unknown	Unknown	September 21, 1993	455501	12.6
14	2	"Letter to the President"	Unknown	Unknown	September 28, 1993	455502	10.5
15	3	"Faking the Grade"	Unknown	Unknown	October 5, 1993	455503	13.1
16	4	"Old Car"	Unknown	Unknown	October 12, 1993	455504	13.5
17	5	"Do the Fright Thing"	Joel Zwick	Fred Rubin	October 19, 1993	455506	13.1
18	6	"Not With My Sister"	Unknown	Unknown	November 2, 1993	455505	10.7
19	7	"Reach for the Stars"	Joel Zwick	David Chambers	November 23, 1993	455510	7.6
20	8	"Pinball Wizard"	Unknown	Unknown	December 7, 1993	455509	8.0
21	9	"The Pit Stop"	Joel Zwick	Scott Spencer Gorden	December 14, 1993	455508	9.3
22	10	"The Penthouse"	Joel Zwick	David Chambers	December 21, 1993	455507	10.0
23	11	"Sell It Like It Is"	Joel Zwick	Fred Rubin	January 8, 1994	455513	9.6
24	12	"In the Driver's Seat"	Joel Zwick	Barry O'Brien & Cheryl Alu	January 15, 1994	455511	8.7
25	13	"A Life in the Theater"	Joel Zwick	David Chambers	January 22, 1994	455512	6.3
26	14	"It Takes a Thief"	Joel Zwick	Scott Spencer Gorden & Casey Maxwell Clair	January 29, 1994	455514	9.3
27	15	"The Rich Guy"	Joel Zwick	Barry O'Brien & Cheryl Alu	February 12, 1994	455516	9.9
28	16	"Three Days of the Condo"	Richard Correll	Kevin Larkin	May 28, 1994	455515	7.2
29	17	"Teacher's Pest"	Joel Zwick	Fred Rubin	June 4, 1994	455517	6.3
30	18	"Just Say No"	Joel Zwick	Eunetta T. Boone	June 11, 1994	455518	5.7
31	19	"My Brilliant Career"	Joel Zwick	Jack Lukes & David Ankrum	June 18, 1994	455519	7.1

== Awards and nominations ==
Year	Award	Result	Category	Recipient
1994	Nominated	Young Artist Awards	Youth Actress Leading Role in a Television Series	Ashleigh Sterling
