= Miller-Boyett =

American production company

Miller-Boyett Productions
- Type: Production
- Industry: Television production
- Founded: 1972; 54 years ago (original); 2015; 11 years ago (relaunch)
- Defunct: July 9, 1999; 27 years ago (original)
- Key people: Thomas L. Miller (co-founder; partner, 1972–2020); Edward K. Milkis (co-founder; partner, 1972–1984); Robert L. Boyett (partner, 1978–2020); Garry K. Marshall (associate, 1974–1984); William S. Bickley (associate, 1991–1997); Michael Warren (associate, 1991–1997; partner, 1997–1999)
- Products: Television programs

Miller-Boyett Productions (or simply Miller-Boyett) is an American television production company that mainly developed television sitcoms from the 1970s through the 1990s. It was responsible for family-oriented hit series such as Happy Days, Laverne & Shirley, Mork & Mindy, The Hogan Family, Bosom Buddies, Full House, Perfect Strangers, Family Matters and Step by Step.

The company traces its roots back to Miller-Milkis Productions, which was formed in 1972. Its original run as a production company remained uninterrupted until its initial shutdown in 1999, having changed from the longtime Miller-Boyett name to Miller-Boyett-Warren two years prior. In 2015, the company was resurrected under the former Miller-Boyett name.

== History ==
The production company was founded in 1972 by program executive Thomas L. Miller and former film editor Edward K. Milkis as Miller-Milkis Productions. The company had an exclusive deal with Paramount Television to produce television shows. The company bought its first big hit, that of Happy Days in 1974, which ran for 11 seasons over 10 years, and spawned a lineup of spinoffs. In 1979, the company became Miller-Milkis-Boyett Productions once Robert L. Boyett (who was a creative consultant of Happy Days at the time) joined the company, before adopting the Miller-Boyett name five years later following Milkis' resignation.

Most of the series the company produced for ABC during the Miller-Boyett era aired on the network's Friday night lineup (known as TGIF from 1989 to 2000). The company brought out hits that were deemed to be popular, and wanted stronger attention. During the 1990–91 season, all four Friday comedies on ABC were Miller-Boyett series: Perfect Strangers, Full House, Family Matters and the short-lived Going Places; and the company had six sitcoms on the air during that same season, along with The Hogan Family (which had moved to CBS, after a five-season run on NBC) and the short-lived The Family Man. Around 1997, Michael Warren, longtime Miller-Boyett associate and co-creator of Family Matters and Step by Step, broke his partnership with producer partner William Bickley after twenty-one years and joined Miller-Boyett Productions; the company was renamed Miller-Boyett-Warren Productions and produced its last shows, Meego and Two of a Kind. After both shows were cancelled, the company was shut down. For the 1997–98 season, a majority of the shows went to CBS through their short-lived Friday Night Block Party sitcom block, although an attempt to do a sitcom for The WB collapsed.

Originally, the company was set up at Paramount Television when the company was formed. After Milkis left the company, Miller and Boyett left Paramount to work for Lorimar Television in 1985, which was folded into Warner Bros. Television in 1993. Despite the fact that the company shut down as Miller-Boyett-Warren Productions, it was, and still is, referred to as "Miller-Boyett Productions" (or just simply "Miller-Boyett").

In 2013, Boyett returned to television producing under his own production nameplate, Robert L. Boyett Productions. With veteran producer Robert Horn, he co-created the FX sitcom Partners, which was co-produced by his company, along with Robert Horn Productions, Grammnet Productions, and Debmar-Mercury, among other contributors. Robert L. Boyett Productions alone was originally said to be in development with Jeff Franklin Productions for the upcoming 2016 Full House sequel series, Fuller House. However, when a front cover image of the first Fuller House shooting script was made public in late July 2015, both Miller and Boyett were listed as executive producers on the script, with Miller-Boyett Productions being listed at the bottom of the cover page—thus confirming that the production company has been effectively resurrected.

== Production team members ==
- Thomas Lee Miller (August 31, 1940 – April 5, 2020 (aged 79)) – After growing up in Milwaukee, he started his career as assistant to director Billy Wilder. Miller also previously served as a development executive at Paramount and 20th Century Fox. In 1970, a year after starting the company with Edward K. Milkis, he co-created Nanny and the Professor with producer A. J. Carothers. Prior to then, he was a writer of The Year of the Horse in 1966, and in 1969 he was in charge of development for The Immortal and did the same job in the 1970s for Weekend of Terror and Assault on the Wayne. He later wrote episodes for Nanny and the Professor and Me and the Chimp and co-created that show with Garry Marshall. Miller co-produced the feature films Silver Streak (1976) and Foul Play (1978) with Edward Milkis. Miller died on April 5, 2020, after Fuller House ended production.
- Robert Lee Boyett (born 1942 (age 83–84)) – He grew up in Atlanta, and later on moved to New York City to become a development executive at ABC, then later became senior vice president at Paramount Television. He later became a creative consultant to Happy Days on its mid-seasons before joining Miller and Milkis in 1978. Boyett however was not credited as an executive producer with Tom Miller and Ed Milkis on most series in the Miller/Milkis/Boyett era. Following the dissolution of the Miller-Boyett-Warren company, Boyett became a producer for Broadway theatre productions. He currently resides in Salisbury, Connecticut.
- Edward Kenneth "Eddie" Milkis (July 16, 1931 – December 14, 1996 (aged 65)) – A lifelong resident of Los Angeles, California, he became a film editor on such movies as North by Northwest. Next he signed on as the associate producer of Star Trek. Later on, he was involved in some of Tom Miller's early shows prior to the establishment of Miller-Boyett. He died on Saturday, December 14, 1996, at the age of 65, after a lengthy illness. His last production was Exit to Eden, which he produced alongside Garry Marshall.
- Michael Warren started his career as the associate producer of The Partridge Family, where he met writer/Producer William S. Bickley. Then as an associate producer on Happy Days for its second season, later a story consultant with William Bickley, who was then a story editor. The two men produced Out of the Blue in 1979. Warren and Bickley later wrote for Happy Days and Perfect Strangers, before creating Family Matters, Getting By and Step by Step between 1989 and 1993, at that point Bickley and Warren became squarely producers instead of producer/writers, before officially ending their partnership around the time of the cancellation of Family Matters and Step by Step and joining the Miller-Boyett team.

=== Associates to Miller, Boyett, Milkis and Warren ===
- Garry Marshall (Henderson Productions) (1974–1984, most series produced through the end of the Miller-Milkis-Boyett era)
- Robert Stigwood (The Stigwood Group, Ltd.) (1979, Makin' It)
- Hal Sitowitz (Myrt-Hal Productions) (1981, Foul Play)
- William Bickley & Michael Warren (1984–1998; Perfect Strangers, Family Matters, The Family Man, Step by Step, Getting By)
- Valerie Harper (Tal Productions, Inc.) (1986–1987; Valerie)
- Robert Griffard & Howard Adler (1987–1999; Perfect Strangers, Going Places, Step by Step, Two of a Kind)
- David W. Duclon (1990–1998; Family Matters, On Our Own)
- Gregory Harrison (Catalina Television) (1990–1991; The Family Man)
- Suzanne de Passe (de Passe Entertainment) (1994–1995; On Our Own)

=== Collaborators with Miller, Boyett, Milkis and Warren ===
- Leonard Katzman (1974–1976, Petrocelli)
- Chris Thompson (1980–1982, Bosom Buddies)
- Jeff Franklin (1987–1995, 2016–2020; Full House, Fuller House)
- Mary-Kate and Ashley Olsen (Dualstar) (1998–1999; Two of a Kind)

== List of shows produced by either production team ==
=== Miller-Milkis Productions ===
==== Television series ====
- Angie (1979–1980; produced by Miller-Milkis, early 1979; produced by Miller-Milkis-Boyett, 1979–1980)
- Blansky's Beauties (1977)
- Happy Days (1974–1984; produced by Miller-Milkis, 1974–1981; produced by Miller-Milkis-Boyett, 1981–1984)
- Laverne & Shirley (1976–1983; produced by Miller-Milkis, 1976–1981; produced by Miller-Milkis-Boyett, 1981–1983)
- Makin' It (1979)
- Mork & Mindy (1978–1982; produced by Miller-Milkis, 1978–1981; produced by Miller-Milkis-Boyett, 1981–1982)
- Out of the Blue (1979)
- Petrocelli (1974–1976)
- $weepstake$ (1979)
- Walkin' Walter (1977, rejected sitcom pilot starring Sam "Spo-Dee-O-Dee" Theard and Madge Sinclair)

==== Made-for-television films ====
- The Heist (1972)
- Night of Terror (1972)
- The Weekend Nun (1972)
- The Devil's Daughter (1973)
- Egan (1973, two-hour movie pilot for a proposed police drama starring Eugene Roche)

==== Theatrically released films ====
- Silver Streak (1976)
- Foul Play (1978)

=== Miller-Milkis-Boyett Productions ===
==== Television series ====
- Bosom Buddies (1980–1982)
- Goodtime Girls (1980; first series with Miller-Milkis-Boyett production team)
- Foul Play (1981; adaptation of Miller-Milkis' 1978 theatrical film)
- Joanie Loves Chachi (1982–1983)

==== Made-for-television films ====
- Little Darlings (1982, made-for-TV version of Stephen J. Friedman's 1980 theatrical film)

==== Theatrically released films ====
- The Best Little Whorehouse in Texas (1982)

=== Miller-Boyett Productions ===
==== Television series ====
- The Family Man (1990–1991)
- Family Matters (1989–1998)
- Full House (1987–1995; produced in association with Jeff Franklin Productions)
- Fuller House (2016–2020; produced in association with Jeff Franklin Productions)
- Getting By (1993–1994)
- Girls Across The Lake (rejected 1997 pilot for The WB starring Cindy Williams, Steve Witting and Maggie Lawson)
- Going Places (1990–1991)
- The Hogan Family (1986–1991, originally titled Valerie and then Valerie's Family: The Hogans; first series with Miller-Boyett production team)
- On Our Own (1994–1995)
- Perfect Strangers (1986–1993)
- Step by Step (1991–1998)

==== Direct-to-video films ====
- Urkel Saves Santa: the Movie (2023; produced in association with Warner Bros Animation)

=== Miller-Boyett-Warren Productions ===
- Meego (1997; first series with Miller/Boyett/Warren production team)
- Two of a Kind (1998–1999; last series produced by the company before the initial 1999 shut-down)
