= The Hogan Family =

American sitcom (1986–1991)

- Original cast from 1986–1987
- Also known as: Valerie (1986–1987); Valerie's Family: The Hogans (1987–1988)
- Genre: Sitcom
- Created by: Charlie Hauck
- Starring: Valerie Harper; Sandy Duncan; Jason Bateman; Danny Ponce; Jeremy Licht; Josh Taylor; Edie McClurg; Steve Witting; Tom Hodges; Josie Bissett; Angela Lee; John Hillerman; Judith Kahan; Christine Ebersole
- Theme music composer: Charles Fox; Stephen Geyer
- Opening theme: "Together Through the Years", performed by Roberta Flack
- Composer: Bruce Miller
- Country of origin: United States
- Original language: English
- No. of seasons: 6
- No. of episodes: 110 (list of episodes)

Production
- Executive producers: Charlie Hauck; Thomas L. Miller; Robert L. Boyett; Tony Cacciotti; Irma Kalish
- Producers: Ronny Hallin; Linda Marsh; Margie Peters; Richard Correll; Judy Pioli; Chip Keyes; Doug Keyes; Laura Schrock; Steven Pritzker; Deborah Oppenheimer; Bob Keyes; Shari Hearn; Michael Loman; Larry Spencer
- Camera setup: Film; Multi-camera
- Running time: 22–24 minutes
- Production companies: Miller-Boyett Productions; TAL Productions, Inc.; Lorimar Productions; Lorimar-Telepictures; Lorimar Television

Original release
- Network: NBC
- Release: March 1, 1986 – May 7, 1990
- Network: CBS
- Release: September 15, 1990 – July 20, 1991

The Hogan Family (originally titled Valerie and later Valerie's Family: The Hogans) is an American sitcom television series that aired on NBC from March 1, 1986, to May 7, 1990, and later aired on CBS from September 15, 1990, to July 20, 1991, for a total of six seasons. It was produced in association with Lorimar Productions (1986), Lorimar-Telepictures (1986–88), and Lorimar Television (1988–91).

Under the title Valerie, the show centered on Valerie Harper in the title role as a mother trying to juggle her career as a buyer for an auction house and raising three teenage sons with a husband (Josh Taylor) often absent due to his airline pilot job. After the first two seasons, Harper was fired from the show due to a salary dispute involving future ancillary profits. Her character was killed off at the start of season three, and Sandy Duncan joined the cast as Valerie's sister-in-law and the boys' aunt. The series was retitled Valerie's Family: The Hogans, and for the rest of the series, it was retitled The Hogan Family.

== Cast ==
- Valerie Harper as Valerie Hogan (seasons 1–2)
- Sandy Duncan as Sandy Hogan (seasons 3–6) who replaced Valerie as the mother figure of the family
- Jason Bateman as David Hogan
- Danny Ponce as Willie Hogan
- Jeremy Licht as Mark Hogan
- Josh Taylor as Michael Hogan
- Christine Ebersole as Barbara Goodwin (season 1)
- Judith Kahan as Annie Steck (season 2)
- Edie McClurg as Mrs. Patty Poole (seasons 2–6)
- Tom Hodges as Rich (seasons 2–4, guest appearance in season 6)
- Steve Witting as Burt Weems (seasons 3–6; previously made guest appearances in season 2)
- Willard Scott as Peter Poole (seasons 3–4)
- Angela Lee as Brenda Walker (seasons 5–6)
- Josie Bissett as Cara Eisenberg (seasons 5–6)
- John Hillerman as Lloyd Hogan (season 6)
- Scotty Gelt as Mark Murphy (recurring;season 5)
- Lisa Rinna as Annie Derrick (recurring; season 5)

== Episodes ==
Season	Title	Episodes	Originally released			Rank	Rating
Season	Title	Episodes	First released	Last released	Network	Rank	Rating
1	Valerie	10	March 1, 1986	May 19, 1986	NBC	#24	18.1 (tied with Moonlighting and Falcon Crest)
2	Valerie	22	September 28, 1986	May 4, 1987	NBC	#39	14.8 (tied with The ABC Sunday Night Movie)
3	Valerie's Family: The Hogans	21	September 21, 1987	May 2, 1988	NBC	#20	16.9 (tied with My Two Dads)
4	The Hogan Family	21	October 3, 1988	May 8, 1989	NBC	#22	16.3 (tied with NBC Sunday Night Movie and The Wonder Years)
5	The Hogan Family	23	September 18, 1989	May 7, 1990	NBC	#32	14.2
6	The Hogan Family	13	September 15, 1990	July 20, 1991	CBS	#85	6.5 (tied with Cop Rock)

=== Early seasons ===
Like most American sitcoms in the 1980s, the series sometimes dealt with moral conflicts, but not in a heavy-handed fashion. In the very special episode "Bad Timing", which first aired February 7, 1987, David and a former girlfriend debate whether to have sex. The episode featured the first use of the word condom on a prime time television program.

After a modest start in the ratings that was countered by critical success, Valerie had begun to show growth in the Nielsens by the end of the 1986–87 season. Its most significant ratings jump occurred after its moving to Mondays at 8:30/7:30c in March 1987, following ALF. NBC renewed the series for a third season in May. In light of the show's success, Harper and her husband, Tony Cacciotti, approached their producers and NBC about per-episode salary increases and a larger cut of future syndication revenue. When all of the couple's requests were refused, Harper and Cacciotti walked out on Valerie. Harper had history in this situation, as she staged a walkout in 1975 following the first season of her hit series Rhoda (and its parent series, The Mary Tyler Moore Show) which successfully resulted in a pay increase.

The couple continued to negotiate with Miller-Boyett Productions, Lorimar-Telepictures and NBC during the next few months as the behind-the-scenes struggle became well publicized. NBC programming chief Brandon Tartikoff, who was unhappy with the feud, publicly stated that he would replace Harper with another actress if the fighting did not cease. Tartikoff suggested Sandy Duncan as a replacement to Miller and Boyett, who both sided with the network chief in this possible casting decision. Duncan had recently signed a contract with NBC for a starring vehicle, and Tartikoff felt that this would be the best opportunity for her to make use of it. Though the NBC case was dismissed, Harper and Cacciotti won their trial against Lorimar on September 16, 1988, and were awarded $1.82 million in damages; which they both later donated to various charities. Harper left the show and was replaced by Duncan as the female lead.

=== Network switch ===
The cast of The Hogan Family with the inclusion of Sandy Duncan

In 1990, after spending three of the last four years on Monday nights at 8:30/7:30 (having been on Sundays before that), NBC opted not to respond to an agreement made with Lorimar insisting that the network had to exercise renewal options on the series before April 1. Despite the series still sporting decent ratings, NBC stated that it chose not to renew The Hogan Family "because of the strength of our current development." The show was then picked up by CBS for the sixth and final season. Ratings for this CBS season were poor; the series was cancelled in December 1990, after 13 episodes of season 6 were produced (only 9 of which had aired). The final four episodes (including a Christmas episode) were shown by CBS months later, in July 1991.

== Production ==
=== Theme music and presentation ===
The theme song, "Together Through the Years", was performed by Roberta Flack and composed by Charles Fox. The lyrics were written by Stephen Geyer.

== Syndication ==
The Hogan Family aired in American syndication on local television stations, from September 1990 until the summer of 1998. From August 1998 until August 1999, startup broadcast network PAX TV aired reruns of the series weekdays at 4/3c.

ABC Family previously held the American syndication rights to the program and had aired episodes twice daily for five weeks from September 25 to October 27, 2006. It has discontinued running the show since then.

In Canada, the Crossroads Television System held the Canadian syndication rights and began airing the show on Wednesday nights. It discontinued airing the show in 2011.

The Hogan Family title was used for syndicated showings of almost all episodes, including those broadcast as Valerie or Valerie's Family, along with a shortened theme.

In 2016, Antenna TV announced that it would air the series in 2017. The Christmas episode was the first to air on the network on December 16, during a marathon of holiday-themed episodes from Antenna TV programs throughout the month, before the show officially joined the lineup on January 2, 2018.

On September 1, 2021, the series began airing on Antenna TV's new sister network Rewind TV, which features sitcoms from the 1980s through the 2000s until it was removed on September 27, 2025. It has since return 3 months later in December 2025.

In the United Kingdom, the series was shown on BBC1 from 1986 to 1992.

== Home media ==
On October 19th, 2026, Warner Bros. released the complete series of The Hogan Family for digital purchase, making all six seasons of the show available to own digitally for the first time.

== See also ==
- The Conners, the revamped revival of Roseanne after Roseanne Barr was fired, that also killed off her character
