= TGIF (TV programming block) =

American television programming block

- Logo used for the third incarnation of TGIF
- Network: ABC
- Launched: Original run: September 22, 1989; 37 years ago Second run: September 26, 2003; 23 years ago Third and final run: October 5, 2018; 8 years ago
- Closed: Original run: September 8, 2000; 26 years ago Second run: September 16, 2005; 21 years ago Third and final run: September 13, 2019; 7 years ago
- Country of origin: United States
- Format: Friday-night sitcom block
- Running time: 2 hours (with commercials)
- Original language: English

TGIF was an American prime time television programming block that aired on ABC at various points starting in the late 1980s. The name comes from the initials of the popular phrase "thank God it's Friday"; however, the stars of the lineup touted the initialism as meaning "Thank Goodness It's Funny." In its various incarnations, the block mainly featured situation comedies aimed at a family audience, and served as a lead-in to the long-running newsmagazine 20/20 (which has been part of ABC's Friday-night schedule since September 1987, two years prior to the original launch of TGIF).

The block initially premiered on September 22, 1989, as a partnership with Lorimar Television and television producers Thomas L. Miller and Robert L. Boyett (who had a deal with Lorimar), marking one of the first attempts by a major network to brand a programming block (a concept that was concurrently becoming popular among cable networks at the time of its inception), with the goal of encouraging young viewers to watch the entire lineup and not just a particular show. Performers from one of the featured shows hosted the lineup, appearing in brief segments throughout the evening. The TGIF block dominated the ratings in the 18–49 demographic for most of the 1990s. However, ratings began declining during the latter half of the decade due partly to Fridays becoming more common for social outings among segments of the block's key demographic as well as the loss and aging quality of many of the lineup's signature shows, culminating in the end of the original incarnation after eleven years on September 8, 2000.

ABC revived the TGIF brand on September 26, 2003, with its second run lasting only two seasons, ending on September 15, 2005. On May 15, 2018, ABC announced that it would revive the block, with the third incarnation, which was launched on October 5, 2018. This newest incarnation of TGIF consisted of a mix of sitcoms and game shows. The incarnation was short-lived, with the block ending for the third time on September 27, 2019.

== History ==
=== ABC Friday-night legacy: 1950s to 1970s ===
Family-friendly comedies, which featured families with children as major characters, were a staple of ABC's programming dating back to the network's earlier sitcoms from the 1950s onward, such as The Adventures of Ozzie and Harriet (which premiered in 1952), Leave It to Beaver (which moved to ABC in 1958, after spending its first season on CBS), The Donna Reed Show (which premiered in 1958), The Flintstones (which premiered in 1960, but was largely an adult-oriented animated comedy until the birth of Pebbles in 1963), The Brady Bunch (which premiered in 1969), and The Partridge Family (which premiered in 1970; that series and The Brady Bunch became part of the Friday night lineup at that time).

=== Jim Janicek ===
TGIF was created and executive produced by Jim Janicek. Prior to the official launch of the block, Janicek was employed as a writer and producer for ABC Entertainment, who was in charge of promoting the network's Tuesday- and Friday-night comedy lineups. Recalling his childhood when his family would gather to watch The Wonderful World of Disney, he was inspired to create a family-oriented comedy block. In 1988, Janicek began gaining support for his concept by approaching the studios and talent of independently produced ABC shows, promoting the synergy and potential success of the family block brand. With four ABC family-oriented comedy series on board, and the backing of network president Bob Iger, the initial lineup for the block was created.

Before ABC experienced its success on that night during the 1980s, its Friday night schedule consisted of hit comedies such as Webster (which remained on Fridays until its cancellation by ABC in 1987, only to subsequently be renewed by Paramount Television as a first-run syndicated series), Benson (which would be cancelled at the end of the 1985–86 season) and Diff'rent Strokes (which moved to ABC in 1985 after being cancelled after seven seasons by NBC, only to cancelled by ABC following its eighth and final season). The block of predominantly family-friendly situation comedies was inaugurated in the 1988–89 season with three series that were already part of the Friday lineup (Perfect Strangers, Full House and Mr. Belvedere) and a sophomore series new to that night, Just the Ten of Us (a spinoff of Growing Pains, which originally aired on Tuesdays for its abbreviated first season in the spring of 1988).

Since the 1987–88 season, Perfect Strangers stars Mark Linn-Baker and Bronson Pinchot (in character as Larry Appleton and Balki Bartokomous, respectively) had been doing hosted interstitials that were conducted from the Perfect Strangers set, originally airing during the two-hour Wednesday sitcom block that their series was part of as that season began. In March 1988, Perfect Strangers moved to Fridays, and the interstitials went with them. On Fridays, the hosted interstitial concept gained more traction before the family-friendly concept on that night was actually implemented. Pinchot and Linn-Baker would remain the sole hosts of the Friday lineup throughout the 1988–89 season.

Meanwhile, ABC began reformulating its Tuesday night lineup which, for the past several seasons, had consisted of a comedy block from 8:00 to 9:00 p.m. Eastern Time followed by two hour-long dramas, most notably with the hit series Moonlighting airing at 9:00 p.m. Eastern. Moonlighting, then in its fifth season and starting to experience a considerable decline in its ratings (greatly thanks to the 1988 WGA strike, which delayed the premieres of many programs set to launch or return for the 1988 fall season), was placed on a temporary hiatus by ABC in February 1989 when the network decided to add a second hour of comedy offerings onto its Tuesday schedule. Janicek, in response, came up with the idea to promote the restructured lineup under a unified brand name, Terrific Tuesday, to draw audiences to the changes, to reference the two additional sitcoms that were being offered, and especially as a nod to Who's the Boss? and the freshman smash hit Roseanne, which now served as a strong anchor for the expanded comedy lineup.

The Terrific Tuesday branding was a success, and ABC urged Janicek to continue the banner name for the following season. At the time of the network upfronts that unveiled the upcoming fall schedule in May 1989, Janicek, as well as ABC, devised the notion of further promoting their family fun-themed Fridays with a brand name. Over the summer, ABC began promoting the Friday sitcoms under the experimental title, "The Friday Fun Club". While Terrific Tuesday and What-a-Wednesday were both on tap for the 1989–90 fall season, the Friday branding concept was to undergo a revision before September.

=== First run (1989–2000) ===
==== Brand debuts ====
Animated mice in the first TGIF opening sequence

As a result of ABC and Jim Janicek's plan for Friday brand familiarity, definitive changes occurred to the lineup on Friday, September 22, 1989. An opening sequence for the two-hour block was introduced, featuring animated mice against a gray background. The theme music, featuring a male vocalist and a falsetto-tuned backup chorus, sang the lyrics, "Time for fun (thank goodness!)/Time for a good laugh (it's funny!)/Time, time, time, time for fun! (T-T-T-Time!)". The mice held up title cards containing the selected theme lyrics "Thank goodness" and "It's funny!" right in the way of an older mouse. The sequence concludes with the older mouse breaking a grandfather clock with a mallet, which cut to the hosted interstitial.

For the first time, another show's cast assumed hosting duties for the interstitials in place of the stars of Perfect Strangers. Dave Coulier, John Stamos and Mary-Kate and Ashley Olsen (alternating as Michelle Tanner) all appeared on the set of Full House introducing the season and series premieres that night. As they began their first segment, the TGIF name was officially introduced, in which its meaning, "Thank Goodness It's Funny", was re-emphasized from the theme lyrics. Coulier and Stamos also announced that a new policy, in which stars from the other three TGIF programs would rotate hosting responsibilities along with them on a week-to-week basis, would begin. Rotating with Full House that season were the casts of new arrival Family Matters, Perfect Strangers (whose first night its cast members hosted the Friday lineup under the TGIF banner occurred on October 13, 1989) and Just the Ten of Us. On the premiere night of TGIF, the new (and ultimately short-lived) comedy Free Spirit aired as a preview telecast at 9:30 p.m. Eastern Time, with Just the Ten of Us reclaiming its time slot the following week.

Larry Appleton (Mark Linn-Baker) and Balki Bartokomous (Bronson Pinchot) during an interstitial for TGIF (1989)

During the inaugural season of the format, the TGIF logo was only featured at the start of every hosted segment, appearing in a design where each letter was encased in a tall gray box (as pictured to the right); the boxes would flip in at the bottom of the screen, stand still for a few seconds, and then turn out. One of the animated mice from the TGIF title sequences was featured on some weeks within the live-action host segments, and was introduced by the actors as the lineup's mascot, known as "Friday the Mouse". Custom bumpers would appear after the final scene of each program, where normally a short cut of the show's title logo and theme would play, denoting the final commercial break.

During the first season of TGIF, the bumpers featured additional animations of the mice, including variants that featured the taller mouse popping out of the grandfather clock, a small mouse being dragged around by a running chainsaw around it, the taller mouse walking towards the grandfather clock, thinking it over, and then backtracking, and the taller mouse popping up from the top and bottom of the screen on both sides of the show's title logo. The official title logo for the respective program (as opposed to the logo designs used mainly in network promotions for each show that were used in the block's bumpers in later years) was displayed on either side of the clock. The closing animation, which ran after the credits of the 9:30 program (usually Just the Ten of Us), consisted of the same theme music, albeit with the lyrics, "See you next week... here for a good laugh", followed by a few instrumental notes. One such animation involved the taller mouse holding what looked like a parade float likeness of himself, as it flies out of control and he flies around with it. Another shows the mouse walking with a blowtorch and mask on, but he doesn't know that the plug comes lose, so he angrily walks back.

==== Explosive success in the 1990s ====
With the TGIF moniker permanently in place, more changes in presentation occurred as the lineup grew in popularity. On September 21, 1990, the animated mice opening and accompanying theme music were dropped from the Friday block, in favor of a new graphics package that officially incorporated the new TGIF name for the first time. With these new visuals came the "classic" TGIF theme ("It's Friday night/And the mood is right/Gonna have some fun/Show you how it's done, TGIF.").

For most of TGIF's run until the 1998–99 season, at least one series on the lineup was produced (and in some cases, developed) by the team of Thomas L. Miller and Robert L. Boyett, whose relationship with ABC traces back to the premiere of Love, American Style – produced by Miller and former producing partner Edward K. Milkis under a development deal with Paramount Television – in 1972. The first two series were Perfect Strangers and Full House, both of which were produced through Miller-Boyett's development deal with Lorimar Television (absorbed into Warner Bros. Television in 1993) and aired on the network's Friday night schedule prior to the launch of TGIF. (The latter premiered in September 1987 as part of the network's Friday schedule, while the former concurrently was moved from Wednesdays to Fridays that month.)

Family Matters, a spin-off of Perfect Strangers that debuted in September 1989 as part of the inaugural TGIF lineup, originally centered solely on the family of Harriette Winslow (Jo Marie Payton), who began as a recurring character on its parent series (where her cop husband, Carl (Reginald VelJohnson), was also first introduced). Earning modest ratings early on, the series evolved into a major hit following the addition of breakout character Steve Urkel (Jaleel White) midway through its first season; the character's promotion to the main cast in its second season (gradually becoming the primary focus of the show), resulted in Family Matters shifting from a "down-to-earth" family sitcom to a mix of conventional family comedy and slapstick-driven storylines (with sci-fi elements being weaved into plots in later seasons as Urkel was further developed from a proud nerd who served as the Winslows' annoying neighbor into a budding scientist and inventor).

By this point, Miller-Boyett and Lorimar had ownership stakes in the block and were therefore responsible for the majority of programming duties. All four TGIF shows featured as part of the block's 1990–91 Fall schedule were produced by them (a move that resulted in the cancellation of Just the Ten of Us, despite it maintaining fairly decent ratings in its Friday slot), with Perfect Strangers, Family Matters and Full House being joined by Going Places, a comedy centering on the lives of four roommates (Alan Ruck, Heather Locklear, Jerry Levine and Hallie Todd) who write for a Candid Camera-style hidden camera show. Being a more adult-targeted entry in the 9:30/8:30 TGIF slot, Going Places initially lagged behind its sister shows; a mid-season retool, one that placed an equal emphasis on juvenile characters and saw the adult leads' job setting switch to a late-night talk show, improved ratings. (Ironically, Perfect Strangers maintained a similar, virtually exclusive focus on adult characters even after moving to TGIF and had abandoned plans to add child actress Alisan Porter to its cast as a young neighbor to lead characters Balki and Larry after one episode that same season.)

Going Places was cancelled after one season in spite of its ratings increase, and was replaced in the 1991–92 season by Baby Talk, a sitcom based on the film Look Who's Talking that initially scored high ratings as a mid-season replacement – temporarily occupying Going Places's time slot – in the Spring of 1991; however, ratings for the show collapsed in its second season, resulting in its cancellation. Also added as a midseason replacement in April 1991 was Dinosaurs, a Jim Henson Television-produced live-action comedy using audio-animatronic puppetry, centering on the Sinclairs, a family of anthropomorphic dinosaurs living in prehistoric Pangaea; often touching upon sensitive topical issues (such as environmentalism, women's rights, sexual harassment, LGBT rights, censorship, body image, drug abuse, racism and peer pressure, sometimes through satire) seldom dealt with on family sitcoms of the time, Dinosaurs spent much of its four-season run on TGIF, up through the conclusion of its third season in 1993. (Note: ABC aired Dinosaurs on Wednesdays for most of its second season (1991–92, returning to Fridays for the remainder of the season in late Spring 1992) and its abbreviated fourth season (June–July 1994), during which ABC cancelled the series. Unaired fourth season episodes would later air in 1995 on The Disney Channel, through its cable syndication rights to the series.)

Also joining the lineup for the 1991–92 season was another Miller-Boyett series, Step by Step, a star vehicle for Suzanne Somers and Patrick Duffy (the latter having come off an eleven-year run as Bobby Ewing on the CBS prime time soap Dallas) that went on to become a TGIF mainstay for the next six seasons. The Brady Bunch-inspired comedy centered on two single parents (Duffy and Somers), each with three children (two of them played by former Going Places co-stars Staci Keanan and Christopher Castile), who create a stepfamily after marrying each other in the midst of a whirlwind romance while on vacation. (As a result of picking up Step by Step and renewing Baby Talk, ABC decided to move Full House from Fridays to Tuesdays for 1991–92, having it lead off the latter night's lineup that included hit series Roseanne, Coach and freshman offering Home Improvement.)

During the most successful years of TGIF, the main characters of one of the Friday prime-time sitcoms would "host" the two-hour block of episodes for that week. Always in character, they would introduce each show and comment on the proceedings afterward. Sometimes, characters from a series that did not air on the Friday schedule would appear to host. For example, in January 1996, Daniel Hugh Kelly, Betsy Brantley and other stars from the short-lived drama Second Noah served as one-time-only guest hosts of TGIF as a cross promotion for the new Saturday series. Occasionally, the hosts for the evening would find a common thread between each show. Each Fall from 1989 to 1996, cast members from various TGIF shows co-hosted ABC's annual Saturday morning preview specials, outlining the new programs being added to the network's children's program lineup. (After The Walt Disney Company began programming the Saturday morning lineup in 1997, in the wake of its prior acquisition of ABC, these preview specials were hosted for the remainder of TGIF's run by the hosts of Disney's One Saturday Morning; ABC ceased producing annual Fall preview specials for its children's programming slate—becoming the last of the Big Three networks to discontinue the practice—after the 1999–2000 season.)

When TGIF officially launched, weekly promos for the lineup were voiced by actor and resident ABC announcer Robert Ridgely, who had mainly been voicing sitcom promos (including those for Fridays) for a few years before the brand was incorporated. Veteran television personality and announcer Gary Owens (who had been with ABC since 1985 as a primetime promo voiceover) became the sole announcer for weekly TGIF promotions beginning with the 1990–91 season. Owens remained as the "voice of TGIF" until the end of the 1995–96 season. During the 1995–96 season, fellow voice actor and resident ABC announcer Brian Cummings shared announcer duties with Owens (doing weekly promos for the lineup whenever he wasn't available). The following two seasons (1996–97 to 1997–98) had Kenny Jones (one of the main ABC announcers at that time, alongside Owens and Cummings) becoming the sole announcer while Jerry Houser did it throughout the 1998–99 season. Also during the 1990–91 season, Impel Marketing, in partnership with ABC, released a series of trading cards featuring publicity shots featuring the stars of Perfect Strangers, Full House and Family Matters to promote the block.

After trying out three new series during the 1992–93 season that were canceled either because of poor ratings (Camp Wilder and Where I Live, the latter's occurring weeks after its October 1993 move to Saturdays for its short-lived second season) or network politics (Getting By, which moved to NBC for its second and final season), the 1993–94 season saw the additions of three new comedies to the block, two of which would provide some needed stability to the lineup for most of the time up through the end of the 1995–96 season. The first was Boy Meets World, a sitcom from Dinosaurs co-creator Michael Jacobs with similar underlying themes as the then-recently concluded ABC dramedy The Wonder Years, centering around Cory Matthews (Ben Savage, the younger brother of Wonder Years star Fred Savage) as he navigates life with his family, friends and ever-present teacher and neighbor George Feeny (William Daniels); the series—which was the longest-running TGIF comedy series not produced by Miller–Boyett, and the only long-running sitcom to air on the block for the series' entire run—was a breakout ratings success and received favorable reviews from critics for its humor and handling of the complications surrounding the transition from childhood to adulthood.

Moving from Tuesdays for its second season that year was Hangin' with Mr. Cooper, a series from Full House creator Jeff Franklin that debuted in September 1992 as a starring vehicle for comedian Mark Curry (playing NBA player-turned-teacher—and eventually, high school basketball coach—Mark Cooper), and co-stars Dawnn Lewis (previously of A Different World) and Holly Robinson (previously of 21 Jump Street). Concurrent with both Cooper's move to Fridays and Lewis's departure, the series was retooled from its original focus on three adult roommates into more of a family-oriented comedy, which saw Curry and Robinson being joined in the main cast by Raven-Symoné (previously of The Cosby Show) and Saundra Quarterman as Cooper's cousins, Marquise Wilson (who recurred in the first season, promoted to main cast in the second season) as his pre-teen neighbor, and Nell Carter as his childhood babysitter-turned-high school principal and boss. (Note: Longtime Miller-Boyett collaborators William Bickley and Michael Warren, who wrote for Perfect Strangers and created Family Matters, Step by Step and Getting By, would later serve as Cooper's showrunners for its last three seasons beginning with the 1994–95 season.) Serving as a Spring replacement for Cooper in 1994 and 1995 was Sister, Sister, starring Tia and Tamera Mowry as identical twins adopted at birth to parents with polar-opposite personalities (Tim Reid and Jackeé Harry) who are reunited during a chance encounter at a clothing store. (Note: ABC aired Sister, Sister on Tuesdays for the final four episodes of its first season (which ran from April–September 1994) and on Wednesdays for most of its second season (1994–95), before returning to Fridays in March 1995 for the latter's final five episodes.) Despite scoring decent ratings over its two seasons on the network (particularly among teenage viewers), ABC canceled Sister, Sister in May 1995, a few weeks after its second season concluded. (It was subsequently picked up by fledgling “netlet” The WB, where it ran for four additional seasons.)

==== Summer months ====
During the first few years of TGIF, the host interstitials varied during the Summer months. The regular hosting rotation continued with new segments during the Summer of 1990, the final months of the "mice" motif. For the late Spring and Summer of 1991, ABC decided to relieve the TGIF stars of filming/taping segments from their respective sets. Instead, stars performed voiceovers for "TGIF Trivia", game-like segments made up of episode scenes and multiple-choice questions. The trivia quiz provided "A", "B" and "C" choices of events that the home viewer was supposed to choose from for a supposed "single" correct answer; in reality, all choices were correct in each round, as every scene featured was from an actual episode inclusion. Stars that narrated TGIF Trivia included Heather Locklear (Going Places), Telma Hopkins (Family Matters), Jodie Sweetin (Full House) and Melanie Wilson (Perfect Strangers).

For the late Spring and Summer of 1992, ABC ran a promotional contest that chose winners from around the country to host TGIF for a week from their own homes. Those that were chosen were instructed to videotape their own segments from home, giving commentary on the shows that would air on the week they were scheduled to be featured. Families, individuals, groups of friends, couples, and most prominently teenagers were among the winners.

The voiceover narration format from TGIF stars returned for the late Spring and Summer of 1993. This time, however, a rotation of stars would simply voice previews over upcoming episode scenes. As with the "TGIF Trivia" format in 1991, a single star – among them, Brandon Call (Step by Step) and Jo Marie Payton (Family Matters) – would handle the duties each week. Payton, in particular, had the distinction of having one of the weeks she did segment narrations on August 6, 1993, when Perfect Strangers (where her Family Matters character Harriette Winslow originated) aired its series finale. From 1994 to 1999, it would either be one (original on-camera host segments) or the other (voiceover narration format) during the summer months.

==== Spin-off concepts ====
In the spring of 1991, with TGIF's meteoric success, ABC president Bob Iger and Senior Vice President of Marketing of ABC Entertainment, Mark Zakaran appointed Jim Janicek to expand his branding work to other portions of the ABC entertainment schedule.

===== The Hump (1991) =====
Janicek's first attempt to replicate the success of TGIF came in August 1991, when ABC launched a three-hour comedy block on Wednesday nights for the 1991–92 season. Loosely known as The Hump, via the tagline "Over the hump!" used in advertisements ("Three hours of non-stop laughs are guaranteed to get you over the hump!", "That'll get you over the hump!") and the use of a 1970s funk-flavored background jingle which chanted, "I've got to get over the hump", the format came complete with promos that used a special graphics scheme, differing from TGIF and ABC's nights of regular, non-concept based lineups. The concept title was another play on a popular catchphrase, in which Wednesday is typically referred to as "hump day" (being the middle of the work week, thus making it "over the hump" toward the weekend).

From August to September 1991, the formation of The Hump consisted of The Wonder Years, Growing Pains (in the month leading to its move to Saturday nights), Doogie Howser, M.D., Davis Rules (which had been cancelled in May 1991, to be renewed by CBS for its second season), Anything but Love and Married People (which was cancelled in March 1991), which were all in summer reruns. For the new fall season, the lineup changed to feature Dinosaurs at 8:00 p.m. ET (in The Wonder Years' former slot), The Wonder Years at 8:30 (replacing Growing Pains), new sitcom Sibs at 9:30, and the new sitcom Good & Evil at 10:30. The sitcoms that aired between 9:30 and 11:00 (Sibs, Anything but Love and Good & Evil) were separately marketed from the first three Hump shows as "comedies made specifically for adults". The "adult" promos for The Hump exclusively featured the funk-styled song, whereas promos for the 8:00–9:30 p.m. shows, and the entire lineup in general, used the instrumental version of the 1991 jingle for ABC's "America's Watching" campaign. Unlike TGIF and its future one-off concept I Love Saturday Night, The Hump did not use hosted interstitials or customized bumpers for the last commercial break of each show.

With the cancellation of Good & Evil in late October, which the network claimed was entirely due to its low ratings in its 10:30 p.m. slot (although many advocacy groups claimed it was due to the controversy surrounding the defamatory portrayal of a blind character), along with the lackluster first-month ratings for Sibs, ABC was convinced that the three-hour comedy block was a failure. The network opted to give the 10:00 p.m. slot on Wednesdays back to an hour-long drama, the upcoming legal series Civil Wars, during November sweeps. The Hump concept aired for the last time on October 30, 1991, and ABC resumed promoting the Wednesday lineup in standard fashion. Sibs went on hiatus, and Anything but Love was moved back into its former 9:30 p.m. Eastern slot on Wednesdays. For the weeks of November 6 and 13, 1991, specials aired in the 10:00 p.m. slot, prior the premiere of Civil Wars on November 20.

===== MCTV: More Cool TV (1991–93) =====
At the start of the 1991–92 season, Janicek also brought the hosted programming block format to Saturday mornings, under the title MCTV (More Cool TV). This title indicated that after TGIF on Friday nights, there was "more cool TV" just hours away on Saturday morning; this block ran from September 7, 1991, to January 23, 1993. Live-action stars of the network's Saturday morning lineup, most notably including the cast of ABC's Land of the Lost revival, hosted interstitials every half-hour. The MCTV segments at times were several seconds shorter than those shot for TGIF. While an opening sequence and custom last-segment show bumpers were included, the theme music used was the instrumental version of ABC's 1991 "America's Watching" campaign. The latter music continued as a part of the MCTV scheme in its second year, despite ABC having launched the "It Must Be ABC" image campaign at that time.

Also notably airing on MCTV was the cartoon Hammerman, whose star, MC Hammer, gave even more meaning to the Saturday morning lineup's moniker. Hammer himself appeared as host of MCTV on a few occasions. Hammerman was cancelled by the end of the 1991–92 season. In the fall of 1992, while the MCTV branding continued in use during the Saturday morning schedule, promos for the lineup no longer referenced the "More Cool TV" tagline.

===== I Love Saturday Night (1992) =====
Seeing how TGIF dominated prime time on Fridays in the face of typical decreased television viewership on that night, Janicek and company felt that the same marketing power could translate into success for Saturday night. Saturday, as an even heavier social night not spent at home by viewers in the 18–49 demographic, resulted in most networks airing shows with older demographics, those with family appeal, or programs faltering in the ratings on other nights (or in the most political cases, shows that a network no longer has confidence in). NBC had claimed dominant victory on Saturday nights throughout the 1980s and into the 1990s, with an eclectic mix of family-themed shows and sophisticated comedies aimed at an older audience (such as The Golden Girls, 227, Amen and Empty Nest). ABC, however, had continued to struggle on Saturday nights. Through the end of the 1990–91 television season, recent programs such as The ABC Mystery Movie and China Beach had experienced a quick death after moving to Saturdays, leading to such bold decisions as moving the nationwide phenomenon Twin Peaks to Saturday in order to shore up the lineup. After reformatting the Saturday night lineup for the 1991 fall schedule to include an hour of comedy followed by another established drama and a freshman drama, ABC announced plans for a Saturday TGIF offshoot to premiere at mid-season.

Titled I Love Saturday Night, it launched to provide a new night and time for three of ABC's aging sitcoms, Who's the Boss?, Growing Pains (both of which had been comprising the Saturday 8:00–9:00 p.m. block since September 1991) and Perfect Strangers (which was still highly rated, but moved to Saturday to help the declining ratings of Boss and Pains). The newcomer that rounded out the lineup was the Steven Bochco cartoon Capitol Critters. Premiering on February 1, 1992, the two-hour comedy block of I Love Saturday Night coincided with Western drama The Young Riders, which had been airing Saturdays in the 9:00 p.m. Eastern hour, going on a three-month hiatus. Freshman dramedy The Commish, meanwhile, remained at 10:00 p.m. Eastern.

I Love Saturday Night was structured exactly like TGIF, with hosts from each show rotating every week, down to its own set of branding graphics and a theme song. The intro to the lineup began with a red ABC logo encased inside an animated heart, which bounced around, and then off, the screen. Set against various-colored backgrounds (but most commonly blue), the lineup's title was then spelled out in the opening alongside views of animated suns, moons and palm trees. The theme song itself—with the lyrics S-A-T-U-R-D-A-Y../ Saturday Night! / I Love Saturday / Saturday Night—even had a calypso sound to it, with Jamaican-style male vocals. The last two lines of the theme were often sung over the show bumpers that led into the last commercial break of each show.

The I Love Saturday Night lineup received heavy promotion, as ABC was valiantly trying to achieve any remaining life out of Who's the Boss? and Growing Pains especially, although both series had fallen out of the Nielsen Top 30 following their move to Saturdays (dropping to #76 and #75, respectively, in the ratings for 1991–92). Such efforts to revitalize both series had been undertaken at the start of the season; Boss resolved the “will-they-or-won’t-they” plotline between lead characters Tony Micelli (Tony Danza) and Angela Bower (Judith Light), transitioning from an employee/boss relationship to a romantic couple, while Pains (which dealt with a showrunner change spurred by creative disagreements with series regular Kirk Cameron, who became a born-again Protestant Christian four years earlier, over plot material he considered inappropriate) added a new character, homeless teen Luke Brower (Leonardo DiCaprio, whose character was taken in by the Seaver family at the insistence of eldest son Mike, played by Cameron), in an ultimately unsuccessful effort to appeal to teenage female viewers. Those in the industry suspected that Perfect Strangers was moved to Saturdays not necessarily since it could have bolstered the lineup's performance, but because it was part of an ABC agenda to kill the series (ABC's explanation in its move from Fridays was that it did not fit the new TGIF demographic, youth aged 10–18).

Cast members from all three of the live-action shows hosted I Love Saturday Night in rotation during the five-week run:

- February 1, 1992: Mark-Linn Baker and Bronson Pinchot, Perfect Strangers
- February 8, 1992: Kirk Cameron, Jeremy Miller and Leonardo DiCaprio, Growing Pains
- February 15, 1992: Judith Light, Who's the Boss?
- February 22, 1992:† Mark-Linn Baker and Bronson Pinchot, Perfect Strangers
- February 29, 1992: Kirk Cameron, Jeremy Miller, Ashley Johnson and Leonardo DiCaprio, Growing Pains

† Capitol Critters and Perfect Strangers did not air on this night, although Pinchot and Linn-Baker did host. The Jaleel White Special—an hour-long variety special starring the Family Matters actor—aired from 8:00 to 9:00 p.m., followed by Who's the Boss? at 9:00 and Growing Pains in its regular 9:30 slot.

Ultimately, the block was neither able to alleviate ABC's struggles with its Saturday prime time lineup or replicate TGIF's success. Saturday night on ABC (especially up against NBC's powerhouse lineup of the evening) seemed a surefire place to send even a popular show into considerable ratings decline. This is exactly what happened, as ABC’s Saturday night ratings dropped to their lowest point of the season during the February sweeps period (save for The Commish, which had become successful in its first season), with Perfect Strangers experiencing the largest single-season ratings decline for a series (after averaging at #32 the previous year, it finished the 1991–92 season at #61 as a consequence of the midseason move to Saturday). After five dismal weeks in the Nielsens, ABC had a rapid loss of faith in I Love Saturday Night; the branding concept for the Saturday lineup was used for the last time on February 29, 1992.

Beyond the quick demise of I Love Saturday Night, the same lineup, more or less, continued on ABC for the remainder of the 1991–92 season. Capitol Critters was cancelled in March; this caused the remaining three shows to switch slots in order to provide a choice time period for the Head of the Class spinoff Billy, which moved to the lineup (Billy had previously been a part of TGIF from its January 31, 1992 premiere until March). Boss and Pains, meanwhile, had announced the end of their runs in the spring of 1992, but both would remain on Saturdays until summer reruns. These shows aired their one-hour finales on Saturday, April 25, 1992, along with the series finale of MacGyver, which aired on this night for one week only. Both Perfect Strangers and Billy would remain part of the lineup after Boss and Pains relocated.

Two new sitcoms premiered on Saturdays that spring and summer: Julie, starring Julie Andrews (with a future TGIF star, eventual Boy Meets World cast member Rider Strong, as Andrews's stepson), and the David Lynch-produced comedy On the Air. The failure of these programs, along with ABC's decision to not renew Billy for a second season and the announcement that Perfect Strangers was going on a long hiatus (concluding its run in the summer of 1993 with an abbreviated six-episode eighth season), halted attempts by ABC to program comedies or family fare – outside of movies – on that night. (The Commish would run for four additional seasons, ending in January 1996.) Once every few years, ABC would again try to program such shows on Saturday nights with no success; for example, during the 1995–96 season, it scheduled The Jeff Foxworthy Show and the Marie Osmond–Betty White vehicle Maybe This Time during the 8:00 p.m. ET hour on that night (the former was replaced in February 1996 by the adult-skewing Tony Danza–Lori Loughlin romantic comedy vehicle Hudson Street, which was moved to Saturdays from its original Tuesday slot). The lone exception in this case was The Wonderful World of Disney, which ABC revived after Disney bought the network and eventually moved to Saturday nights in 2003 (replacing a more general-audience movie showcase that had been airing since the 1999–2000 season, after ABC stopped offering first-run series on that night), where it ran until it was discontinued as a weekly film showcase in 2008.

==== Special events ====
On November 23, 1995, ABC scheduled a music special for The Beatles Anthology. To promote the special on the previous Friday (November 17), the respective opening theme songs for all of the TGIF sitcoms were replaced with Beatles songs, regardless of the individual shows' plot with the exception of Boy Meets World, which used a song by The Monkees as its theme that week (as the episode featured a guest appearance by the group's members).

On May 9, 1997, TGIF aired special episodes of two series (one on its regular lineup and another normally scheduled on Sundays) as part of ABC's "3D Week", a week-long event (running from May 6 to May 12) intended to promote the two-part miniseries 20,000 Leagues Under the Sea (which aired on May 11 and 12) featuring special episodes of ABC shows incorporating 3D effects viewable with the aid of special glasses available at Wendy's restaurants. (Boy Meets World, Sabrina, the Teenage Witch and Step by Step, the latter of which ironically was preempted, did not feature episodes utilizing the 3D gimmick.) Hosted by Brandon Call and Jason Marsden (as their Step by Step characters J.T. Lambert and Rich Halke), it featured the eighth-season finale of Family Matters ("A Pirate's Life For Me", also the last new episode to air on ABC due to the show's then-recently announced move to CBS for the 1997–98 season) and a new episode of America’s Funniest Home Videos at 9:30 p.m. ET, which was original host Bob Saget's penultimate episode and featured appearances by most of his former Full House castmates, sans the Olsen Twins. (Saget's final episode as host, the $100,000 eighth-season finale, aired nine days later on May 18.)

On May 16, 1997, the block aired an hour-long magic special, All-Star TGIF Magic (which aired in place of Family Matters and Boy Meets World in the 8:00 p.m. ET slot that week), coinciding with the May 19 airing of the special David Blaine: Street Magic (the first of several magic specials featuring Blaine—who co-hosted that night's block with Call, as his Step by Step character—that ABC aired into the 2000s). The special, hosted by Caroline Rhea (who played Hilda Spellman on Sabrina at the time), featured current and past TGIF stars performing magic acts including Bronson Pinchot (of Perfect Strangers and, at the time of the special's broadcast, Step by Step), Jodie Sweetin (of Full House), Ben Savage (of Boy Meets World), Raven-Symoné (of Hangin' with Mr. Cooper), Tia and Tamera Mowry (of Sister, Sister, which by then was airing on The WB) and Jason Marsden (of Step by Step); along with appearances by Donna D' Errico, Jonathan Lipnicki and R&B group All-4-One.

On November 7, 1997, all four TGIF shows that night had a storyline (TGIF Time Warp, "Time Goes Insane Friday") in which Salem from Sabrina the Teenage Witch (voiced by Nick Bakay) caused the characters in each show to travel back to a different point in time – the result of the warlock-turned-anthropomorphic cat having swallowed a "time ball". On an episode of Boy Meets World aired the previous week (October 31), Melissa Joan Hart made a second cameo, as an aside, due to the episode in question ("The Witches of Pennbrook") featuring a plot involving a coven of witches—led by a character played by former Full House co-star Candace Cameron Bure—being thwarted from taking the soul of supporting main character Jack Hunter (played by Matthew Lawrence); the cameo featured fellow main character Eric Matthews (Will Friedle) describing the event and swearing off witches, not realizing that Sabrina is one.

Musical group Hanson hosted TGIF on November 28, 1997 (during Thanksgiving weekend) as a tie-in to their half-hour music special Meet Hanson. Between each show and leading up to the special's 9:30 p.m. ET broadcast, segments showed the group in the studio, "commanding" the shows to come on, and at one point even incorporating TGIF into their mega-hit song "MMMBop".

==== Change/end of first run (1996–2000) ====
The Walt Disney Company purchased ABC corporate parent Capital Cities Communications in September 1995, and, after finalizing the sale the following year, began reshaping ABC to its preferences beginning in 1996, refocusing its attention towards programming toward teenagers and adult audiences. After a couple years with nearly the exact same lineup, ABC decided to jump start the fading TGIF for the 1996–97 season by putting Step by Step and Hangin' with Mr. Cooper on the back burner (until the Spring of 1997) and launching two new shows that were bookended by popular veterans Family Matters and Boy Meets World.

The first was Sabrina the Teenage Witch, a fantasy sitcom based on the Archie comic book character starring Melissa Joan Hart (who had made her name earlier in the 1990s as the star of Nickelodeon's Clarissa Explains It All) in the titular role. (Note: Hart had played the Sabrina character—given the adaptational surname "Sawyer", later changed to "Spellman" for the series—earlier that year in a Showtime made-for-TV movie that acted as the series' unofficial pilot.) Becoming a breakout hit out of the gate, it was ABC's most successful Friday comedy launch since Boy Meets World debuted three years earlier (in September 1993), and helped breathe new life into the lineup. With its mix of supernatural and conventional teen sitcom elements, Sabrina was a buzzy show among ABC's target audience for the night and fit nicely with the lineup's other teen-centered shows. The second new show was Clueless, which was based on series creator Amy Heckerling's hit 1995 teen comedy film of the same name, and had many of the film's cast members reprise their roles (albeit with Rachel Blanchard and Michael Lerner replacing Alicia Silverstone and Dan Hedaya, respectively, as lead character Cher Horowitz and her widowed attorney father, Mel). Clueless was the more anticipated show among ABC's two new Friday comedies, though, despite pulling reasonable ratings, it was not as successful as Sabrina was. ABC pulled Clueless from the lineup in February 1997, and cancelled it at the end of the 1996–97 season. (It would subsequently be picked up by UPN, where the sitcom would run for two more seasons.) Step by Step took over Clueless's timeslot when it returned for its 24-episode sixth season in March; the abbreviated fifth (and final) season of Hangin' with Mr. Cooper, however, was pushed to June and burned off all 13 episodes primarily on Saturday nights (although that August, three episodes from the season's back half would air in Cooper's former Friday slot).

As a result of the overhaul to cater to a new audience, longtime TGIF staples Family Matters and Step by Step – both of which had been experiencing steadily declining ratings since the 1994–95 season – were cancelled. Warner Bros. Television quickly cut a deal to move the two shows to CBS for the 1997–98 season, where they would serve as the linchpins for a new, competing family-oriented block managed with Warner Bros. and Miller-Boyett airing on the same night, the CBS Block Party. (Note: Because ABC chose to delay its sixth season to accommodate Sabrina and Clueless on the TGIF lineup, the seventh (and final) season of Step by Step premiered on CBS only five weeks after the show’s sixth season finale—and final original ABC broadcast—aired on August 15.) That block failed to boost CBS's fortunes on Friday nights, with both the lineup and all four of its shows (including the Bronson Pinchot vehicle Meego—which joined the two fellow Miller-Boyett series that were central to the new lineup—and The Gregory Hines Show) only lasting one season.

The success of Sabrina the Teenage Witch prompted ABC to surround it and Boy Meets World with two other supernatural-themed shows as part of "the new TGIF" for 1997–98. The fantasy sitcoms joining the lineup that fall were You Wish, a series from Boy Meets World creator/showrunner Michael Jacobs about a genie (John Ales) living with a family; and Teen Angel, centering on a teenager (Mike Damus) who died during an eating challenge that returns to Earth as his best friend's (Corbin Allred) guardian angel. Neither show was as endearing with audiences as the TGIF shows that earned long runs in previous years, and were also disliked by critics, even with the return of Maureen McCormick (known for her earlier role as Marcia Brady on The Brady Bunch) and the addition of established sitcom star Jerry Van Dyke (coming off his role as Luther Van Dam in the long-running ABC comedy Coach and who, unusually, had supporting roles on both new shows) to the network's Friday night lineup.

The TGIF lineup began to experience sagging ratings throughout 1997–98 in part due to the audience fracture caused by its new competition from CBS's Block Party, which was enough to hurt ABC's ratings dominance on Fridays even though the rival block itself was a failure. Even Boy Meets World and Sabrina the Teenage Witch (despite both shows reaching their peak viewership averages during that season) started to experience declining ratings due to strong competition from Dateline NBC and three successful midseason replacements to the ill-fated CBS Block Party: Unsolved Mysteries (which moved to CBS after a nine-season run on NBC), the Bill Cosby-hosted Kids Say the Darndest Things and the revival of Candid Camera; with the more formidable competition, after eight years, ABC ended the season dethroned as the top-rated network on Friday nights ironically by CBS, which recovered from the Block Party's initial failure by the Spring of 1998, with the help of the three aforementioned midseason replacements as well as the Don Johnson police procedural Nash Bridges.

Although You Wish and Teen Angel were designed in concept to mesh with Sabrina on the lineup (while conversely making Boy Meets World's usually "down-to-earth" concept seem out of place with the other three shows), neither of the two freshman comedies lasted a full season: You Wish was pulled in November after seven episodes (six additional episodes produced before its removal from the network's schedule were burned off from May to July 1998), while Teen Angel lasted 17 episodes before ending in February (both shows returned to the lineup on May 22 for a summer run, which ended in September). With no additional family-oriented sitcoms ordered for that season to replace the cancelled shows, save for a two-week run of the more adult-skewing family comedy Hiller and Diller, ABC simply aired repeats of Sabrina the Teenage Witch and Boy Meets World for the rest of that season (at 8:00 and 9:30 p.m. respectively, leading into new episodes of those series) until May 15, 1998 (season finale of TGIF's 1997–98 season). As part of a network-wide rebranding toward a simplified graphics package, ABC retired the traditional TGIF logo and phased out the theme song.

After a moribund 1997–98 season, the 1998–99 season saw two promising shows in Two of a Kind, a starring vehicle for Mary-Kate and Ashley Olsen centering on a widowed college professor (Christopher Sieber) who hires one of his students (Sally Wheeler) to help take care of his twin daughters, and Brother's Keeper, an "Odd Couple"-style sitcom centering on a widowed college history professor (William Ragsdale) who agrees to let his irresponsible pro-football player brother (Sean O'Bryan) move in with him and his son (Justin Cooper), per a stipulation in his brother's contract with the San Francisco 49ers. ABC thought that the Olsen twins' return to ABC would help boost the block's foundering ratings, and decided to have Two of a Kind lead off the night in the 8:00 p.m. slot. Both shows had respectable ratings throughout the season, although viewership for Two of a Kind gradually declined as the season progressed after a promising start; however, it and Brother's Keeper were both cancelled in May 1999 (repeats of both shows ran until July 16; The Hughleys & Home Improvement filled their spots from July 23 to September 17), marking the second season in a row that the block failed to generate a hit among its freshman shows. The cancellation of Two of a Kind—which was the last series to be produced by the studio until the 2016 debut of Full House reboot Fuller House—also marked the end of ABC's 27-year relationship with Miller-Boyett Productions and its various iterations, (Note: Two of a Kind and Meego were the only series produced under the Miller-Boyett-Warren partnership formed the previous year that saw longtime collaborator Michael Warren join the company as co-partner.) and therefore any involvement with the block they had left (Miller-Boyett and Warner Bros. had their stakes terminated by then). With the block continuing to struggle to generate new hits and ratings for Boy Meets World and Sabrina the Teenage Witch continuing to fall, it seemed that the end of the original TGIF was in sight.

What would become the final season (1999–2000) of TGIF's original run saw additional changes: the hosting segments and skits were officially dropped, and the "TGIF" name was only used for the promos and bumpers; adult-skewing family sitcom The Hughleys (starring comedian D.L. Hughley as the Black owner of a successful Los Angeles vending machine business, who moves his family to a predominantly white middle-class neighborhood) was moved from Tuesdays to Fridays for its second season, while the new comedy Odd Man Out (a vehicle for then-rising teen actor Erik Von Detten, about a teenage boy navigating life with his widowed mother, aunt and three sisters) joined the lineup after being heavily promoted in the summer of 1999 as a last-ditch effort to save the dying block. In March 2000, ABC launched the reality music competition series Making the Band (acting as a mid-season replacement for Odd Man Out) in the midst of the late 1990s–early 2000s boy band craze. The show featured boy-band impresario and eventual convict Lou Pearlman putting together a new group that became O-Town, which would go on to have a couple of successful songs. All four sitcoms that ABC aired on Fridays that season experienced varied fates: Sabrina the Teenage Witch and The Hughleys were both cancelled by ABC and revived by The WB and UPN, respectively (Sabrina ended its seven-year run in 2003, while The Hughleys was cancelled after four seasons in 2002); Boy Meets World voluntarily ended its run after seven successful seasons; and Odd Man Out was cancelled outright by January 2000 after 13 episodes.

The final night of new programming aired on May 5, 2000: that evening featured the hour-long series finale of Boy Meets World, followed by what was billed as "ABC's series finale" of Sabrina the Teenage Witch (as it had just been picked up by The WB for a fifth season), which aired as a two-episode block consisting of the series’ fourth season finale—the final original episode of Sabrina to air on ABC—and a repeat episode. Repeats of both series continued throughout the summer, with repeats of Sabrina continuing to air until August 25, and repeats of Boy Meets World continuing until September 8, 2000 (when ABC aired the first and only original network rerun of that show's series finale) along with the finale of Making the Band (which was later revived on MTV in 2002, following its cancellation by ABC). ABC retired the "TGIF" brand shortly thereafter.

=== Post-TGIF (2000–2002) ===
In September 2000, ABC relaunched its Friday sitcom block under the Working Comedy banner for the 2000–01 season: the block featured fading comedies Two Guys and a Girl and Norm, and freshman sitcoms The Trouble with Normal and Madigan Men, which underperformed. This lineup only lasted one year, with all four shows being cancelled by the end of the season (The Trouble with Normal lasted only five episodes; its replacement, the found-humor filler Dot Comedy, was pulled after only one). ABC then opted to run dramas and reality shows such as The Mole (which only lasted three weeks); it would, however, bring back family-friendly fare to the night in June 2001 with a revived weekly version of America's Funniest Home Videos (which had been airing for the previous two years as a series of specials after a failed retool following the 1997 departure of original host Bob Saget under successors John Fugelsang and Daisy Fuentes), before eventually moving the show back to its former longtime Sunday timeslot for the 2003–04 season to accommodate the revived TGIF. By then, Friday nights were the second-weakest night of the week for television viewership (behind Saturdays), with only a few shows receiving attention, such as CBS's CSI: Crime Scene Investigation, which premiered on Friday (in contrast to the other major broadcast networks, CBS has maintained strong ratings for its Friday evening programming for the most part since then). This meant that for the first time since the 1988–89 television season, ABC promoted Friday night lineups in a standard fashion between 2001 and 2003.

In the summer of 2001, Disney acquired Fox Family from News Corporation and Saban Entertainment, renaming the channel ABC Family. Disney head Michael Eisner hoped to use ABC Family, which became a sister network to ABC and Disney Channel with the purchase, to repurpose ABC network shows. To meet that end, he decided to revive the TGIF block on ABC Family to create additional revenue for ABC's family sitcoms. This effort hit a roadblock due to the fact that ABC did not own the syndication rights to all of its programs. As such, the "new" ABC Family TGIF block, which debuted on March 1, 2002, consisted of the recently acquired dramedy State of Grace, in addition to reruns of ABC's According to Jim and, unusual for what was meant to be a sitcom block, repeats of the drama Alias. Due to poor advertising sales, complaints from ABC affiliates, and show producers concerned that the new block would hurt syndication revenue, ABC Family's TGIF was pulled after a few short weeks.

=== Second run (2003–2005) ===
TGIF returned to ABC on September 26, 2003; the relaunched block received heavy promotion in advance, including a promo spot employing the Village People pop tune "YMCA" (sung as "T-G-I-F"), featuring all the casts of all four family comedies seated on a humorously elongated living-room couch. The initial lineup for the revived TGIF featured returning comedies George Lopez and Life with Bonnie (both of which were comedian-led starring vehicles, respectively for George Lopez and Bonnie Hunt), and freshmen series Married to the Kellys and Hope & Faith (the latter serving as a vehicle for Kelly Ripa, who continued to host the Disney-distributed syndicated talk show Live with Regis and Kelly concurrent with her sitcom role). That season's lineup met with only moderate success, seeing a consistent second- or third-place showing against a popular CBS drama lineup that included Joan of Arcadia and JAG.

For the majority of the TGIF revival, the block aired without a host – thereby differing from the concept of the original 1989 to 2000 version. Hope & Faith was the only show from the previous season that remained on the Friday lineup for the 2004–05 season (George Lopez was moved to ABC's Tuesday comedy block, before being shifted back to its original night of Wednesday; while Life with Bonnie and Married to the Kellys were both cancelled), with 8 Simple Rules moving from Tuesdays to anchor the lineup, joined by freshman comedy Complete Savages and returning workplace sitcom Less than Perfect (transplanted from Wednesdays).

By early 2005, ABC had stopped actively promoting the TGIF name. ABC discontinued the TGIF block for the second time on September 16, 2005; this came despite CBS's cancellations of both Joan of Arcadia and JAG in May 2005. For the 2005–06 season, Hope & Faith continued to air on Friday nights (before moving to Tuesdays, where it ended its run after three seasons amid low ratings opposite Fox powerhouse American Idol), while Less than Perfect was renewed as a midseason replacement (returning in April 2006, joining Hope & Faith on Tuesdays, where it met the same fate).

=== Post-2005 ===
In recent years, Friday nights on ABC have been primarily used to air reality programs (such as Shark Tank), occasional encores of the network's dramas and comedies, and ABC News human interest programming (such as Primetime: What Would You Do?). 20/20 remains a stalwart of the Friday night schedule to end the evening.

Those TGIF series that had reached, or come close to, the 100 episodes necessary to be syndicated were offered to local stations for a time period, after which they were sold to cable channels. Disney Channel aired re-runs of Boy Meets World from 2000 to 2007 and briefly in 2014 (with select episodes from later seasons – particularly, seasons 5-7 – being edited and three other episodes being omitted altogether due to mature subject matter) – the latter instance was part of a programming stunt to promote its sequel series, Girl Meets World, focusing on the children of the earlier sitcom's principal characters Cory Matthews and Topanga Lawrence-Matthews (and airing in the same Friday night time slot as its predecessor). ABC Family has rebroadcast episodes of Boy Meets World (2004–2007, 2010-2015 and since 2024), Full House (2003–2012, and briefly during 2013), Step by Step (2001–2010), Family Matters (2003–2009), Sabrina, the Teenage Witch (2007–2011) and 8 Simple Rules (2007–2014).

MTV2 also aired Boy Meets World (2011–2018) through a separate syndication deal; beginning in 2016, it shared the rights to Boy Meets World with TeenNick, which used the series as a lead-in to its own 1990s block, The Splat. Nick at Nite has aired Full House (2003–2009, 2010–2011 and 2012–2021), Perfect Strangers (2003), Family Matters (2009–2013) and Hangin' with Mr. Cooper (2014–2015). Ion Television, before its transition to an all-drama lineup, ran Perfect Strangers (only during October 2007) and Hangin' with Mr. Cooper (2007–2008). Prior to its replacement by Discovery Family in October 2014, the Hub Network also aired Step by Step and Sister, Sister (which only spent a brief portion of its original ABC run as part of the TGIF block) for several months that year.

On July 27, 2017, Hulu and Warner Bros. Television (whose parent company previously owned a 10% share of the service through Turner Broadcasting System) announced that Hulu would acquire the digital rights to the library of series owned by Warner Bros., that originally aired on the block; this includes the block's most popular shows, such as Family Matters, Full House, Perfect Strangers, and Hangin' with Mr. Cooper. Notable shows not included are Sabrina the Teenage Witch (owned by CBS Media Ventures), Dinosaurs, and Boy Meets World (both already owned by Disney).

==== Return of comedy to Friday nights (2012–2017) ====
On May 15, 2012 (during the upfronts unveiling its 2012–13 schedule), ABC announced the return of family-oriented comedies to its Friday night schedule starting that November, by pairing Last Man Standing and freshman sitcom Malibu Country together from 8:00 to 9:00 p.m. Eastern Time, along with returning shows Shark Tank and 20/20. The TGIF name was not revived, however, with the hour being advertised as ABC Comedy Friday for that season. Happy Endings moved to the 8:00 p.m. hour (with back-to-back original episodes) on Fridays on March 29 after Last Man Standing and Malibu Country ended their respective seasons; that move was effectively criticized as a burn-off maneuver due to both the double-episode scheduling and ABC choosing not to renew Happy Endings (which had been suffering from declining ratings in its previous Tuesday slot earlier that season) for a fourth season two months later.

Due partly to the continued strength of Shark Tank and 20/20 (and to a somewhat lesser degree, Last Man Standing), ABC became a challenger for CBS's usual dominance on Friday nights starting with the 2012–13 season. However, the successes of Last Man Standing and Shark Tank on in their respective Friday slots did not do much to help shore up ratings for the comedies slotted between them in the 8:30 p.m. Eastern time slot, all of which struggled and were eventually cancelled. The one-hour family comedy block returned for the 2013–14 season, with sophomore series The Neighbors joining Last Man Standing, where the former floundered. Another freshman comedy, Cristela (a starring vehicle for co-creator Cristela Alonzo), joined Last Man Standing on Fridays for the 2014–15 season, only to also be cancelled after the conclusion of its first season. Yet another sitcom, Dr. Ken (a star vehicle for former doctor turned stand-up comic Ken Jeong), joined Last Man Standing on the block for the 2015–16 season. (Of the four sitcoms paired with Last Man Standing on Fridays, Dr. Ken was the only series that returned for an additional season, getting a second season renewal for the 2016–17 season.)

Both Dr. Ken and Last Man Standing were canceled in May 2017, with their Friday stablemate Shark Tank being moved to Sundays for the 2017–18 fall season. The changes culminated in ABC choosing to revamp its Friday night lineup – despite continued strong ratings for Last Man Standing and Shark Tank in their respective slots – to focus on drama series, with ABC filling the first two hours of its Friday lineup with returning series Once Upon a Time and freshman Marvel superhero drama Inhumans for the 2017–18 season. (In the case of Last Man Standing, its cancellation was cited as being due to the expiration of a contract between 20th Century Fox Television and ABC, in which 20th Century Fox Television covered the show's production costs, after ABC declined to negotiate license fees to prevent it from having to handle production costs going forward.)

==== TGIT (2014–2018) ====
ABC paid homage to the TGIF phrase and branding when it began marketing its Thursday night lineup for the 2014–15 season, consisting entirely of dramas created by Shonda Rhimes (Grey's Anatomy, Scandal, and How to Get Away with Murder), as "TGIT" (Thank God It's Thursday); other than the similarity in name and both airing on the same network, the two blocks are in no way related, and due to their completely divergent parental ratings, meant for different audiences. Station 19 joined TGIT when that show premiered in 2018.

=== Third and final run (2018–2019) ===
After experiencing mediocre ratings on Fridays, ABC made several programming moves that resulted in the discontinuance of its Friday drama block after one season. In February 2018, ABC announced that Once Upon a Time (which had been experiencing declining viewership throughout its run, with its most noted declines taking place since its fifth season) would end after seven seasons. That May, the network cancelled Inhumans after one season, while giving another Marvel series, Agents of S.H.I.E.L.D. (which replaced Inhumans for the 2018 midseason), a sixth season renewal for ABC's summer 2019 schedule.

For its 2018–19 schedule, ABC announced it bring back comedies to the Friday night slot, with the lineup consisting of returning family sitcoms Fresh Off the Boat and Speechless, along with the game show Child Support (which experienced decent viewership for its inaugural season in the winter of early 2018). In July 2018, ABC confirmed that the block would reinstate the "TGIF" name when the lineup debuted on October 5. Unlike the previous incarnations, the block only consisted of an hour of sitcoms, as Child Support (which maintained some comedic elements) occupied the 9:00 p.m. hour. The first promo debuted during Fresh off the Boat on August 10, 2018, featuring new graphics and using an updated version of the 1994–96 variant of the block's original theme. In a twist, Last Man Standing – which was picked up by Fox for a seventh season after a one-year sabbatical – competed against the TGIF block, leading off an hour-long comedy block (Fox's first attempt at airing sitcoms on Fridays since a short-lived effort in the fall of 2009) called Fox Funny Friday, airing in the same timeslot that ABC carried it for most of its original run. For its season premiere, the child casts from Fresh Off the Boat and Speechless hosted the lineup: the segments were featured in the middle of each show, including the outro.

For the 2019 midseason, the block was reduced to one hour, as ABC permanently expanded 20/20—which had shifted away from its traditional newsmagazine roots a few years earlier to focus mainly on true crime stories—to two hours. In September 2019, the TGIF name was once again retired, no longer being mentioned in promos and bumpers, with the block being referred as to "ABC Friday Night"; the remaining sitcoms were dropped by the spring of 2020 in favor of the returning Shark Tank.

== Lineup history ==
Cyan indicates the top-20 most watched programs of the season.
Magenta indicates the top-30 most watched programs of the season.
Orange indicates the top-40 most watched programs of the season.
Silver indicates the top-50 most watched programs of the season.

Season		8:00 p.m.	8:30 p.m.	9:00 p.m.	9:30 p.m.	10:00 p.m.	10:30 p.m.
ABC Friday Night
1985–1986	Fall	Webster	Mr. Belvedere	Diff'rent Strokes	Benson	Spenser: For Hire	
1985–1986	Winter	Webster	Mr. Belvedere	Diff'rent Strokes	He's the Mayor	The Fall Guy	
1985–1986	Spring	Webster	Mr. Belvedere	Mr. Sunshine	Joe Bash	The Fall Guy	
1986–1987	Fall	Webster	Mr. Belvedere	Sidekicks	Sledge Hammer!	Starman	
1986–1987	Winter	Webster	Mr. Belvedere	Gung Ho	Dads	Starman	
1986–1987	Spring	The Charmings	Webster	The ABC Friday Night Movie			
1987–1988	Fall	Full House	I Married Dora	Max Headroom		20/20	
1987–1988	Winter	Full House	Mr. Belvedere	The Thorns	Sledge Hammer!	20/20	
1987–1988	Spring	Perfect Strangers	Full House	Mr. Belvedere	Family Man	20/20	
1988–1989	Fall	Perfect Strangers	Full House	Mr. Belvedere	Just the Ten of Us	20/20	
1988–1989	Winter	Perfect Strangers	Full House	Mr. Belvedere	Just the Ten of Us	20/20	
1988–1989	Spring	Perfect Strangers	Full House	Mr. Belvedere	Just the Ten of Us	20/20	
Original run
1989–1990	Fall	Full House	Family Matters	Perfect Strangers	Just the Ten of Us	20/20	
1989–1990	Winter	Full House	Family Matters	Perfect Strangers	Just the Ten of Us	20/20	
1989–1990	Spring	Full House	Family Matters	Perfect Strangers	Just the Ten of Us	20/20	
1990–1991	Fall	Full House	Family Matters	Perfect Strangers	Going Places	20/20	
1990–1991	Winter	Full House	Family Matters	Perfect Strangers	Going Places	20/20	
1990–1991	Spring	Full House	Family Matters	Perfect Strangers	Baby Talk	20/20	
1991–1992	Fall	Family Matters	Step by Step	Perfect Strangers	Baby Talk	20/20	
1991–1992	Winter	Family Matters	Step by Step	Baby Talk	Billy	20/20	
1991–1992	Spring	Family Matters	Step by Step	Dinosaurs	Baby Talk	20/20	
1992–1993	Fall	Family Matters	Step by Step	Dinosaurs	Camp Wilder	20/20	
1992–1993	Winter	Family Matters	Step by Step	Dinosaurs	Camp Wilder	20/20	
1992–1993	Spring	Family Matters	Step by Step	Getting By	Where I Live	20/20	
1993–1994	Fall	Family Matters	Boy Meets World	Step by Step	Hangin' with Mr. Cooper	20/20	
1993–1994	Winter	Family Matters	Boy Meets World	Step by Step	Hangin' with Mr. Cooper	20/20	
1993–1994	Spring	Family Matters	Boy Meets World	Step by Step	Sister, Sister	20/20	
1994–1995	Fall	Family Matters	Boy Meets World	Step by Step	Hangin' with Mr. Cooper	20/20	
1994–1995	Winter	Family Matters	Boy Meets World	Step by Step	Hangin' with Mr. Cooper	20/20	
1994–1995	Spring	Family Matters	On Our Own	Step by Step	Sister, Sister	20/20	
1995–1996	Fall	Family Matters	Boy Meets World	Step by Step	Hangin' with Mr. Cooper	20/20	
1995–1996	Winter	Family Matters	Muppets Tonight	Step by Step	Hangin' with Mr. Cooper	20/20	
1995–1996	Spring	Family Matters	Boy Meets World	Step by Step	Hangin' with Mr. Cooper	20/20	
1996–1997	Fall	Family Matters	Sabrina the Teenage Witch	Clueless	Boy Meets World	20/20	
1996–1997	Winter	Family Matters	Boy Meets World	Sabrina the Teenage Witch	Clueless	20/20	
1996–1997	Spring	Step by Step	Boy Meets World	Sabrina the Teenage Witch	Clueless	20/20	
1997–1998	Fall	Sabrina the Teenage Witch	Boy Meets World	You Wish	Teen Angel	20/20	
1997–1998	Winter	Sabrina the Teenage Witch (R)	Boy Meets World	Sabrina the Teenage Witch	Teen Angel	20/20	
1997–1998	Spring	Sabrina the Teenage Witch (R)	Boy Meets World	Sabrina the Teenage Witch	Boy Meets World (R)	20/20	
1998–1999	Fall	Two of a Kind	Boy Meets World	Sabrina the Teenage Witch	Brother's Keeper	20/20	
1998–1999	Winter	Two of a Kind	Boy Meets World	Sabrina the Teenage Witch	Brother's Keeper	20/20	
1998–1999	Spring	Sabrina the Teenage Witch	Boy Meets World	Two Guys, a Girl and a Pizza Place	Brother's Keeper	20/20	
1999–2000	Fall	The Hughleys	Boy Meets World	Sabrina, the Teenage Witch	Odd Man Out	20/20	
1999–2000	Winter	Boy Meets World	Odd Man Out	Sabrina, the Teenage Witch	The Hughleys	20/20	
1999–2000	Spring	Boy Meets World	The Hughleys	Sabrina, the Teenage Witch	Making the Band	20/20	
ABC Working Comedy (2000–2001)
2000–2001	Fall	Two Guys and a Girl	The Trouble With Normal	Norm	Madigan Men	20/20	
2000–2001	Winter	Who Wants to Be a Millionaire		Two Guys and a Girl	Norm	20/20	
2000–2001	Spring	Making the Band		Who Wants to Be a Millionaire		20/20	
Post-TGIF (2001–2003)
2001–2002	Fall	The Mole: The Next Betrayal		Thieves		Once and Again	
2001–2002	Winter	America's Funniest Home Videos		Various programming		20/20	
2001–2002	Spring	America's Funniest Home Videos		Various programming		20/20	
2002–2003	Fall	America's Funniest Home Videos		Whose Line Is It Anyway?	The Drew Carey Show	20/20	
2002–2003	Winter	America's Funniest Home Videos		Whose Line Is It Anyway?	The Drew Carey Show	20/20	
2002–2003	Spring	America's Funniest Home Videos		8 Simple Rules (R)	Regular Joe	20/20	
Second run
2003–2004	Fall	George Lopez	Married to the Kellys	Hope & Faith	Life with Bonnie	20/20	
2003–2004	Winter	George Lopez	Married to the Kellys	Hope & Faith	Life with Bonnie	20/20	
2003–2004	Spring	George Lopez	The Big House	Hope & Faith	Life with Bonnie	The D.A.	
2004–2005	Fall	8 Simple Rules	Complete Savages	Hope & Faith	Less than Perfect	20/20	
2004–2005	Winter	8 Simple Rules	8 Simple Rules (R)	Hope & Faith	Less than Perfect	20/20	
2004–2005	Spring	America's Funniest Home Videos		Hope & Faith	Less than Perfect	20/20	
Post-TGIF (second era, 2005–2012)
2005–2006	Fall	Supernanny		Hope & Faith	Hot Properties	20/20	
2005–2006	Winter	Dancing with the Stars		In Justice		20/20	
2005–2006	Spring	America's Funniest Home Videos (R)				20/20	
2006–2007	Fall	Grey's Anatomy (R)		Men in Trees		20/20	
2006–2007	Winter	America's Funniest Home Videos (R)		20/20			
2006–2007	Spring	Grey's Anatomy (R)		Six Degrees		20/20	
2007–2008	Fall	Men in Trees		Women's Murder Club		20/20	
2007–2008	Winter	Grey's Anatomy (R)		Desperate Housewives (R)		20/20	
2007–2008	Spring	America's Funniest Home Videos (R)		Duel		20/20	
2008–2009	Fall	Wife Swap		Supernanny		20/20	
2008–2009	Winter	Wife Swap		Supernanny		20/20	
2008–2009	Spring	Surviving Suburbia	The Goode Family	According to Jim (R)	According to Jim (R)	20/20	
2009–2010	Fall	Supernanny		Ugly Betty		20/20	
2009–2010	Winter	Supernanny		Shark Tank		20/20	
2009–2010	Spring	Wife Swap		Jamie Oliver's Food Revolution		20/20	
2010–2011	Fall	Supernanny		Primetime		20/20	
2010–2011	Winter	Supernanny		Primetime		20/20	
2010–2011	Spring	Shark Tank		Primetime		20/20	
2011–2012	Fall	Extreme Makeover: Home Edition				20/20	
2011–2012	Winter	Shark Tank		Primetime		20/20	
2011–2012	Spring	Shark Tank		Primetime		20/20	
ABC Comedy Friday (2012–2017)
2012–2013	Fall	Last Man Standing	Malibu Country	Shark Tank		20/20	
2012–2013	Winter	Last Man Standing	Malibu Country	Shark Tank		20/20	
2012–2013	Spring	Happy Endings		Shark Tank		20/20	
2013–2014	Fall	Last Man Standing	The Neighbors	Shark Tank		20/20	
2013–2014	Winter	Last Man Standing	The Neighbors	Shark Tank		20/20	
2013–2014	Spring	Last Man Standing	The Neighbors	Shark Tank		20/20	
2014–2015	Fall	Last Man Standing	Cristela	Shark Tank		20/20	
2014–2015	Winter	Last Man Standing	Cristela	Shark Tank		20/20	
2014–2015	Spring	Shark Tank		Beyond the Tank		20/20	
2015–2016	Fall	Last Man Standing	Dr. Ken	Shark Tank		20/20	
2015–2016	Winter	Last Man Standing	Dr. Ken	Shark Tank		20/20	
2015–2016	Spring	Beyond the Tank		Shark Tank		20/20	
2016–2017	Fall	Last Man Standing	Dr. Ken	Shark Tank		20/20	
2016–2017	Winter	Last Man Standing	Dr. Ken	Shark Tank		20/20	
2016–2017	Spring	The Toy Box		Shark Tank		20/20	
Post-TGIF (third era, 2017–2018)
2017–2018	Fall	Once Upon a Time		Inhumans		20/20	
2017–2018	Winter	Child Support		Agents of S.H.I.E.L.D.		20/20	
2017–2018	Spring	Once Upon a Time		Agents of S.H.I.E.L.D.		20/20	
Third and final run
2018–2019	Fall	Fresh Off the Boat	Speechless	Child Support		20/20	
2018–2019	Winter	Fresh Off the Boat	Speechless	20/20			
2018–2019	Spring	Fresh Off the Boat	Speechless	20/20			
ABC Friday Night (second era, 2019–present)
2019–2020	Fall	American Housewife	Fresh Off the Boat	20/20			
2019–2020	Winter	American Housewife	Fresh Off the Boat	20/20			
2019–2020	Spring	Shark Tank		20/20			
2020–2021	Fall	Shark Tank		20/20			
2020–2021	Winter	Shark Tank		20/20			
2020–2021	Spring	Emergency Call		20/20			
2021–2022	Fall	Shark Tank		20/20			
2021–2022	Winter	Shark Tank		20/20			
2021–2022	Spring	Shark Tank		20/20			
2022–2023	Fall	Shark Tank		20/20			
2022–2023	Winter	Shark Tank		20/20			
2022–2023	Spring	Will Trent (R)		20/20			
2023–2024	Fall	Shark Tank		20/20			
2023–2024	Winter	Shark Tank		20/20			
2023–2024	Spring	Shark Tank		20/20			
2024–2025	Fall	Shark Tank		20/20			
2024–2025	Winter	Shark Tank		20/20			
2024–2025	Spring	Shark Tank		20/20			

=== Steve Urkel crossovers ===
Steve Urkel of Family Matters made crossover appearances on two other TGIF programs:

- January 25, 1991: Full House Season 4, Episode 16: "Stephanie Gets Framed"
- September 27, 1991: Step by Step Season 1, Episode 2: "The Dance"
