= Where I Live =

American sitcom

- Genre: Sitcom
- Created by: Michael Jacobs; Ehrich Van Lowe
- Written by: Alan Daniels; Gary Hardwick; Michael Jacobs; April Kelly; Lore Kimbrough; Paula Mitchell Manning; Ehrich Van Lowe; Stan Seidel
- Directed by: Arlene Sanford; Rob Schiller; David Trainer; Tom Trbovich; Michael Zinberg
- Starring: Doug E. Doug; Flex Alexander; Shaun Baker; Lorraine Toussaint; Yunoka Doyle; Jason Bose Smith; Sullivan Walker
- Theme music composer: Ray Colcord
- Composer: Ray Colcord
- Country of origin: United States
- Original language: English
- No. of seasons: 2
- No. of episodes: 21 (7 unaired)

Production
- Executive producers: Michael Jacobs; Ehrich Van Lowe
- Producers: Mitchell Bank; Mark Brull; Doug E. Doug; April Kelly; Brian LaPan; Stan Seidel; Dawn Tarnofsky
- Editor: Marco Zappia
- Camera setup: Multi-camera
- Running time: 22–24 minutes
- Production company: Touchstone Television Michael Jacobs Productions

Original release
- Network: ABC
- Release: March 5 – November 20, 1993

Where I Live is an American sitcom that premiered on March 5, 1993, as part of ABC's TGIF lineup. The series was created and executive produced by Michael Jacobs and Ehrich Van Lowe. Its final episode aired on November 20, 1993.

== Synopsis ==
The series starred Doug E. Doug as Douglas St. Martin, a Trinidadian American teenager living in the Harlem section of New York City. He lived with his caring, hard-working parents and his younger sister. Much of the show focused on Douglas's misadventures with his best friends, Reggie (Flex) and Malcolm (Shaun Baker). The show was based on Doug E. Doug's own childhood.

A midseason replacement, the series drew critical acclaim for its realistic portrayals, but the show brought in low ratings compared to rest of the TGIF lineup, putting the show on the brink of cancellation. Support from fans and Bill Cosby helped the show get renewed for a second season. The show returned in the summer on Tuesdays after Full House, which raised the ratings temporarily. Bill Cosby then became a consultant on the series. However, the show was moved to Saturday nights with the debuting George as its lead-in for its second season, and the ratings were even lower than before. Eight episodes were produced for the second season, but the series was cancelled after only three of them had aired.

== Cast ==
=== Main ===
- Doug E. Doug as Douglas St. Martin
- Flex Alexander as Reggie Coltrane
- Shaun Baker as Malcolm Richardson
- Lorraine Toussaint as Marie St. Martin
- Yunoka Doyle as Sharon St. Martin
- Jason Bose Smith as Kwanzie
- Sullivan Walker as James St. Martin

=== Recurring ===
- Almayvonne as Vonzella

== Episodes ==
=== Series overview ===
Season	Episodes	Originally released	
Season	Episodes	First released	Last released
1	13	March 5, 1993	May 7, 1993
2	8	November 6, 1993	November 20, 1993

=== Season 1 (1993) ===
No. overall	No. in season	Title	Directed by	Written by	Original release date	Viewers (millions)
1	1	"Occupant"	Arlene Sanford	Michael Jacobs & Ehrich Van Lowe	March 5, 1993	16.9
2	2	"One Dead Mother"	David Trainer	Lore Kimbrough	March 12, 1993	18.1
3	3	"Curf Me? ... Curfew!"	David Trainer	Gary Hardwick	March 19, 1993	15.9
4	4	"My Fair Forward"	David Trainer	Ehrich Van Lowe	March 26, 1993	15.9
5	5	"Doug Gets Busy"	Rob Schiller	Ehrich Van Lowe	April 2, 1993	15.6
6	6	"Dontay's Inferno"	David Trainer	Stan Seidel	April 6, 1993	18.1
7	7	"Past Tense, Future Imperfect"	David Trainer	Paula Mitchell Manning	April 9, 1993	14.8
8	8	"Opposites Attack"	David Trainer	Alan Daniels	April 16, 1993	14.8
9	9	"Married ... with Children"	David Trainer	Alan Daniels & Lore Kimbrough	April 23, 1993	15.0
10	10	"Malcolm 2X"	David Trainer	April Kelly	April 30, 1993	14.8
11	11	"I Live Where?"	Rob Schiller	Gary Hardwick	May 7, 1993	14.4
12	12	"The Terminator"	Tom Trbovich	Stan Seidel	Unaired	N/A
13	13	"Shirt Happens"	David Trainer	April Kelly	Unaired	N/A

=== Season 2 (1993) ===
No. overall	No. in season	Title	Directed by	Written by	Original release date	Viewers (millions)
14	1	"Big Mon on Campus"	Michael Zinberg	Gary Hardwick	November 6, 1993	8.7
15	2	"I Am Not a Role Model"	Unknown	Unknown	November 13, 1993	8.6
16	3	"The Big Easy"	Unknown	Unknown	November 20, 1993	7.9
17	4	"Local Hero"	Tom Trbovich	Stan Seidel	Unaired	N/A
18	5	"Miracle on 134th Street"	Matthew Diamond	Dave Caplan & Brian LaPan	Unaired	N/A
19	6	"Class Action"	N/A	N/A	Unaired	N/A
20	7	"The Domino Theory"	Matthew Diamond	Lynn Mamet	Unaired	N/A
21	8	"Let Them Eat Snacks"	N/A	N/A	Unaired	N/A

== Syndication ==
Reruns of the series, including the unaired episodes, were broadcast on the TV One cable network in 2009.

In The Netherlands, the series was aired by RTL 4.

== Awards and nominations ==
Year	Award	Category	Recipient	Result
1994	Young Artist Awards	Best Youth Comedian	Doug E. Doug	Nominated
1994	Young Artist Awards	Best Youth Actress Recurring or Regular in a TV Series	Yunoka Doyle	Nominated
