= You Wish (TV series) =

- Genre: Fantasy; Sitcom
- Created by: Michael Jacobs
- Starring: John Ales; Harley Jane Kozak; Alex McKenna; Nathan Lawrence; Jerry Van Dyke
- Composer: Ray Colcord
- Country of origin: United States
- Original language: English
- No. of seasons: 1
- No. of episodes: 13

Production
- Executive producer: Michael Jacobs
- Producers: Mitchell Bank; Jeffrey C. Sherman; John Ales
- Editor: Marco Zappia
- Camera setup: Multi-camera
- Running time: 30 minutes
- Production companies: Michael Jacobs Productions; Touchstone Television

Original release
- Network: ABC
- Release: September 26, 1997 – July 24, 1998

You Wish is an American fantasy sitcom television series created by Michael Jacobs, that ran from September 26, 1997, to July 24, 1998. It started as part of ABC's TGIF programming on Friday nights for the fall of 1997, along with Sabrina, the Teenage Witch, Boy Meets World, and Teen Angel.

== Synopsis ==
In the show's pilot episode (in which the proposed series was still known under a working title of Genie), Gillian Apple (Harley Jane Kozak) and her two children, Mickey Apple (Alex McKenna) and Travis Apple (Nathan Lawrence) visit a rug shop where they meet the owner, Madman Mustafa (John Rhys-Davies). There they buy a rug, where they unexpectedly release a genie (John Ales), who has been imprisoned for 2,000 years. The genie's name is simply "Genie", although in the first episode Gillian refers to him as "Steve from Canoga Park", an alias he later uses. Jerry Van Dyke was introduced to the show in the third episode as Genie's Grandpa Max (thus, Van Dyke was simultaneously appearing on two TGIF series, You Wish and Teen Angel at the same time as different characters).

== Cast ==
- John Ales as Genie
- Harley Jane Kozak as Gillian Apple
- Alex McKenna as Mickey Apple
- Nathan Lawrence as Travis Apple
- Jerry Van Dyke as Grandpa Max

== Production ==
=== Crossovers ===
Although the series made a total of 13 episodes, it was taken off after the seventh episode, "Genie Without a Cause." This episode, which aired on November 7, 1997, was part of a night-long TGIF retro crossover, which started with Sabrina. Sabrina made a time ball, which Salem swallowed and caused the time period to be the 1960s. Salem then crossed over to Boy Meets World, turning it into the 1940s, then this series to the 1950s and then to Teen Angel to the 1970s.

=== Cancellation ===
You Wish was a ratings failure, ranking 92nd for the season and was cancelled after seven episodes. Reruns from the first season of Sabrina the Teenage Witch were added to the TGIF lineup to fill the empty slot for the remainder of the season. The remaining six unaired episodes of the series were burned off in May and June 1998, filling the slot of its fellow new TGIF series, Teen Angel, after that show was canceled.

== Episodes ==
No.	Title	Directed by	Written by	Original release date	Prod. code	Viewers (millions)
1	"Pilot"	David Trainer	Michael Jacobs	September 26, 1997	G201	13.54
Gillian Apple accidentally releases a genie from a rug where he's spent 2,000 years in captivity.
2	"Jillions of Gillians"	Jeff McCracken	Michael Craven & Richard Childs	October 3, 1997	G202	10.53
The Genie clones Gillian, leading to a competition to determine which of the two Gillians will take charge of the family.
3	"The Big Ride"	Jeff McCracken	Susan Estelle Jansen	October 10, 1997	G205	10.44
The Genie's 50,000-year-old grandfather pays a visit and it's learned he must be decommissioned because of his waning powers.
4	"Mind Games"	Jeff McCracken	Stephen Sustarsic & David Silverman	October 17, 1997	G206	10.74
The Genie gives Gillian the power to read minds, which she uses to learn that Mickey is keeping cigarettes in her purse.
5	"A Real Don Juan"	Jeff McCracken	Daniel Paige & Sue Paige	October 24, 1997	G203	9.77
The Genie creates a romantic suitor for Gillian, while Mickey enters a talent contest at school.
6	"Halloween"	Jeff McCracken	Steve Pepoon	October 31, 1997	G207	9.45
On Halloween, the Genie learns what it's like to be human, while his grandpa brings Frankenstein to life.
7	"Genie Without a Cause"	Jeff McCracken	Jeffrey Sherman	November 7, 1997	G209	11.89
The Apples become a stereotypical family and the Genie a rebellious beatnik when a time warp sends them to the 1950s. Note: This episode is part three of a time-travel themed crossover with Sabrina the Teenage Witch, Boy Meets World and Teen Angel that begins on "Inna Gadda Sabrina", continues on "No Guts, No Cory" and concludes on "One Dog Night".
8	"Future Shock"	Jeff McCracken	Linda Mathious & Heather MacGillvray	May 22, 1998	G208	8.68
The Genie and his grandpa must rely on fate when they lose their ability to predict the future and Travis learns to believe in himself.
9	"All in the Family Room"	Jeff McCracken	Linda Mathious & Heather MacGillvray	May 29, 1998	G204	8.03
Gillian uses mementos to redecorate the family room, while Travis uses the Genie's time travel portal to run away to a pirate ship.
10	"Welcome to the Dollhouse"	Jeff McCracken	Daniel Paige & Sue Paige	June 5, 1998	G210	6.73
The Genie shrinks Gillian and can't bring her back to her normal size, so his grandpa takes her to a genie celebration to fix the problem.
11	"The Bad Influence"	Jeff McCracken	Jeffrey Sherman	June 12, 1998	G211	7.94
With the Genie's help, Mickey learns how much of a wild teen Gillian used to be. In the meantime, the Genie has a clumsy apprentice to train.
12	"Bride and Prejudice"	Jeff McCracken	Andrew Nicholls & Darrell Vickers	June 19, 1998	G212	7.21
The Genie's fiancee shows up after 2,000 years of waiting and demands their arranged marriage take place, but Gillian gets in the way.
13	"Gift of the Travi"	Jeff McCracken	Daniel Paige & Sue Paige	July 24, 1998	G213	6.47
On Christmas, the Genie grants a wish for each of the Apple children, Travis's being that every day were Christmas.

== Reception ==
TV Guide called the series "Hammy, artificial, and altogether excruciating".
