= Misery Loves Company (TV series) =

- Genre: Sitcom
- Created by: Michael Jacobs; David Trainer; Bob Young
- Starring: Dennis Boutsikaris; Julius Carry; Christopher Meloni
- Composer: Ray Colcord
- Country of origin: United States
- Original language: English
- No. of seasons: 1
- No. of episodes: 8 (4 unaired)

Production
- Camera setup: Multi-camera
- Running time: 30 minutes
- Production companies: Michael Jacobs Productions; Touchstone Television

Original release
- Network: Fox
- Release: October 1 – October 22, 1995

Misery Loves Company is an American sitcom that aired Sunday at 9:30 on Fox from October 1 until October 22, 1995. The series was produced by Michael Jacobs Productions and Touchstone Television.

== Premise ==
Four guys deal with romantic trials and tribulations.

== Cast ==
- Dennis Boutsikaris as Joe
- Julius Carry as Perry
- Stephen Furst as Lewis
- Wesley Jonathan as Connor
- Christopher Meloni as Mitch
- Nikki DeLoach as Tracy
- Kathe Mazur as Nicky St. Hubbin
- Anna Nicole Smith recurring guest star.

== Episodes ==
No.	Title	Directed by	Written by	Original release date
1	"Advice and Dissent"	John Tracy	Rick Singer & Andrew Green	October 1, 1995
The new boyfriend of Perry's ex-wife is basketball player Dennis Rodman. Joe thinks his brother is dating a transvestite.
2	"Uneasy Rider"	John Tracy	Henry Dunn	October 8, 1995
Joe tries to fit in at a biker bar when he buys a motorcycle.
3	"That Book by Nabokov"	John Tracy	Linda Mathious & Heather MacGillvray	October 15, 1995
Joe considers a relationship with a former student of his.
4	"Pilot"	David Trainer	Story by : Michael Jacobs & Bob Young & David Trainer; Teleplay by : Michael Jacobs & Bob Young	October 22, 1995
Joe shows up at Mitch's place after a brutal divorce settlement.
5	"The Witches of East 6th"	John Tracy	TBD	Unaired
Perry feels blue on Halloween. Mitch goes with Joe and his son when they go trick-or-treating. Lewis works the night shift at the dental office.
6	"The Streak"	TBD	TBD	Unaired
7	"Wu's Company"	TBD	TBD	Unaired
8	"Joe DeMarco, Boy Wonder"	TBD	TBD	Unaired
