= Michael Jacobs Productions =

American media production company

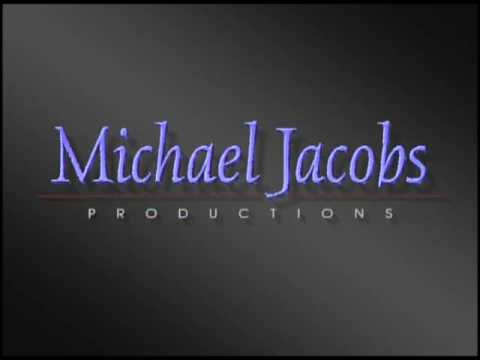
- Logo used since 1991.
- Type: Private
- Industry: Television, film
- Founded: 1978; 47 years ago
- Fate: Dormancy
- Headquarters: Walt Disney Studios, Burbank, California, U.S.
- Key people: Michael Jacobs (president)
- Products: Television series Motion pictures

Michael Jacobs Productions is an American production company located at Walt Disney Studios in Burbank, California. Since 2017, the company has been dormant.

It was founded in 1978 by Michael Jacobs. By 1989, the company had reached a film and television producing deal with The Walt Disney Studios. Previously, Jacobs had a development deal with Tri-Star Television for a development of a comedy project on NBC, a pact that lasted up until 1989.

== Films produced ==
- As Seen Through These Eyes (2007)
- Quiz Show (1994)

== TV series produced ==
- Boy Meets World (ABC; 1993–2000)
- Charles in Charge (CBS; 1984–1990)
- Dinosaurs (ABC; 1991–1994)
- Girl Meets World (Disney Channel; 2014–2017)
- Lost at Home (ABC; 2003)
- Maybe This Time (ABC; 1995–1996)
- Misery Loves Company (Fox; 1995)
- My Two Dads (NBC; 1987–1990)
- No Soap, Radio (ABC; 1982)
- The Sinbad Show (Fox, 1993–1994)
- Singer & Sons (NBC; 1990)
- The Torkelsons (NBC; 1991–1993)
- Together We Stand (CBS; 1986–1987)
- Where I Live (ABC; 1993)
- You Wish (ABC; 1997–1998)
- Zoe, Duncan, Jack and Jane (The WB; 1999–2000)

== See also ==
- Walt Disney Studios (Burbank)
