= Singer & Sons =

- Genre: Sitcom
- Created by: Michael Jacobs; Bob Young
- Directed by: Steve Zuckerman
- Starring: Harold Gould; Esther Rolle; Bobby Hosea; Tommy Ford
- Composer: Ray Colcord
- Country of origin: United States
- Original language: English
- No. of seasons: 1
- No. of episodes: 4

Production
- Executive producer: Michael Jacobs
- Camera setup: Multi-camera
- Running time: 30 minutes
- Production companies: Michael Jacobs Productions; Touchstone Television

Original release
- Network: NBC
- Release: June 9 – June 27, 1990

Singer & Sons is an American sitcom starring Harold Gould and Esther Rolle that was produced by Michael Jacobs Productions and Touchstone Television that was originally broadcast on NBC as a summer replacement series from June 9 to June 27, 1990.

== Synopsis ==
Nathan Singer is a Jewish widower who becomes the third generation to run a family-owned New York City delicatessen called "Singer & Sons." Singer is the first not to have sons inherit it until Sarah, his housekeeper and longtime friend, suggests that he recruit her two sons. Begrudgingly, Nathan hires her sons – Mitchell and Reggie – two brothers with opposite personalities who help bring new life to the business.

== Cast ==
- Harold Gould as Nathan Singer
- Esther Rolle as Sarah Patterson
- Bobby Hosea as Mitchell Patterson
- Tommy Ford as Reggie Patterson
- Brooke Fontaine as Deanna Patterson
- Fred Stoller as Sheldon Singer
- Arnetia Walker as Claudia James
- Anne Berger as Mrs. Tarkasian
- Phil Leeds as Lou Gold

== Episodes ==
No.	Title	Directed by	Written by	Original release date
1	"Two Sons for Singer"	Steve Zuckerman	Michael Jacobs & Bob Young	June 9, 1990
Nathan Singer decides to recruit his housekeeper's sons (Mitchell and Reggie) for his deli business.
2	"The Boxer Rebellion"	Unknown	Michael Jacobs & Bob Young	June 13, 1990
Reggie is convinced he was accidentally switched at birth and that he is the son of boxer Floyd Patterson.
3	"Once Bitten"	Unknown	Michael Jacobs & Bob Young	June 20, 1990
Mitchell is encouraged to reconcile with his ex-wife Felicity.
4	"Our's Not to Reason Why Shmy"	Steve Zuckerman	Neil Alan Levy	June 27, 1990
Every store in the neighborhood has been robbed and Claudia thinks Reggie is the robber.
