= Maybe This Time (TV series) =

American television sitcom (1995–1996)

- Genre: Sitcom
- Created by: Michael Jacobs; Susan Estelle Jansen; Bob Young
- Written by: Amy Engelberg; Wendy Engelberg; Michael Jacobs; Susan Estelle Jansen; Chip Keyes; Heather MacGillvray; Linda Mathious; Peggy Nicoll; Rick Singer; Bob Young; Steve Young
- Directed by: David Trainer
- Starring: Marie Osmond; Betty White; Ashley Johnson; Amy Hill; Craig Ferguson
- Composer: Ray Colcord
- Country of origin: United States
- Original language: English
- No. of seasons: 1
- No. of episodes: 18

Production
- Executive producers: Michael Jacobs; Bob Young
- Producers: Mitchell Bank; Brian J. Cowan; Michael Poryes; David Trainer
- Cinematography: Walter Glover
- Camera setup: Multi-camera
- Running time: 22–24 minutes
- Production companies: Michael Jacobs Productions; Touchstone Television

Original release
- Network: ABC
- Release: September 15, 1995 – February 17, 1996

Maybe This Time is an American sitcom television series created by Michael Jacobs and Bob Young for ABC. It premiered on September 15, 1995, and ended on February 17, 1996, with a total of 18 episodes over the course of 1 season.

The series stars Marie Osmond as a mother and recent divorcee running the family bakery with her mother (Betty White) while raising her 11-year-old daughter (Ashley Johnson). The show's supporting cast includes Amy Hill, Craig Ferguson and Dane Cook, who joined the cast midway through its run.

== Synopsis ==
The series revolved around two elements, the relationships between three generations of women and the bakery which the elder two owned and operated in Haverford, Pennsylvania, a suburb of Philadelphia. Thirtysomething Julia Wallace (Osmond), recovering from a divorce, puts her work running the bakery with her mother Shirley (White) and raising her daughter Gracie (Johnson) over trying to find romance once again. Julia's take comes much to the objection to the man-obsessed Shirley (a variation of White's Sue Ann Nivens from The Mary Tyler Moore Show) and the pre-adolescent Gracie who was waiting for her first kiss at the series outset. Outside of the opposite sex, the dynamics of the relationships between the three characters are explored.

Julia and Shirley were helped at the bakery by Scottish émigré Logan McDonough (Ferguson) whose views complemented those of his bosses. The most frequently seen customer on the series was Kay Ohara (Hill), owner of the pawn shop down the street from the bakery. Assorted other townspeople also came in and out of the bakery as well.

=== Additions ===
Midway through the run, two other characters were added. Kyle (Cook), the quarterback of the football team at an unnamed local college, came in to help out at the bakery while Gracie gained an on-again, off-again boyfriend in the streetwise Nicky (Ross Malinger). The introduction of Nicky coincided with Julia dating his father, Nick Sr. (Robert Cicchini) though their date did not progress any further unlike their children.

== Cast and characters ==
- Marie Osmond as Julia Wallace
- Betty White as Shirley Wallace
- Ashley Johnson as Gracie Wallace
- Amy Hill as Kay Ohara
- Craig Ferguson as Logan McDonough
- Ross Malinger as Nicky
- Robert Cicchini as Nick Sr.
- Dane Cook as Kyle

== Episodes ==
No.	Title	Directed by	Written by	Original release date	Prod. code	Viewers (millions)
1	"Please Re-Lease Me"	David Trainer	Susan Estelle Jansen	September 15, 1995	W–502	18.0
2	"Maybe This Time"	David Trainer	Michael Jacobs & Bob Young & Susan Estelle Jansen	September 16, 1995	W–501	12.9
3	"Gracie Under Fire"	David Trainer	Peggy Nicoll	September 23, 1995	W–503	11.7
4	"Out, Out, Damn Radio Spot!"	David Trainer	Chip Keyes	September 30, 1995	W–506	11.0
5	"Snitch Doggy-Dogg"	David Trainer	Amy Engelberg & Wendy Engelberg	October 14, 1995	W–505	9.8
6	"Beasy Body"	David Trainer	Susan Estelle Jansen	October 28, 1995	W–507	9.4
7	"Julia's Day Off"	David Trainer	Amy Engleberg & Wendy Engleberg	November 4, 1995	W–508	10.8
8	"Coach Julia"	David Trainer	Chip Keyes	November 11, 1995	W–509	11.6
9	"The Other Mother"	David Trainer	Susan Estelle Jansen	November 25, 1995	W–510	8.4
10	"The Catch"	David Trainer	Peggy Nicoll	December 16, 1995	W–511	8.2
11	"Judgement Day"	David Trainer	Steve Young	December 23, 1995	W–504	9.7
12	"Nick at Night"	David Trainer	Heather MacGillvray & Linda Mathious	January 6, 1996	W–513	10.3
13	"Break a Leg"	David Trainer	Rick Singer & Andrew Green	January 13, 1996	W–515	8.9
14	"Lucky Puck"	David Trainer	Steve Young	January 20, 1996	W–512	11.0
15	"Acting Out"	David Trainer	Chip Keyes	January 26, 1996	W–516	16.1
16	"Stand Up Your Man"	David Trainer	Amy Engelberg & Wendy Engelberg	February 3, 1996	W–518	9.9
17	"St. Valentine's Day Massacre"	David Trainer	Rick Singer & Andrew Green	February 10, 1996	W–517	7.2
18	"Whose Life is it Anyway?"	David Trainer	Susan Estelle Jansen	February 17, 1996	W–514	7.5

== Production ==
=== Boy Meets World connection ===
The episode "Acting Out" featured Ben Savage, Rider Strong and William Daniels making cameo appearances as Cory Matthews, Shawn Hunter and George Feeny, their characters from Michael Jacobs's other ABC sitcom Boy Meets World. However, the two series do not exist in the same fictional universe as they appeared in the form of television characters in a fictional episode of Boy Meets World being watched by Gracie, who later had a waking dream about them.

=== Cancellation ===
The series initially entered the Top 20 with the debut of its preview episode on September 15, 1995, but later ranked #47 in its Saturday night timeslot. ABC canceled the series after 18 episodes.

== Awards and nominations ==
Year	Award	Category	Recipient	Result
1996	Young Artist Awards	Best Performance by a Young Actress - TV Comedy Series	Ashley Johnson	Nominated
1996	Young Artist Awards	Best Performance by a Young Actor - Guest Starring Role TV Series	Chris J. Miller	Nominated
