= Lost at Home =

- Genre: Sitcom
- Created by: Michael Jacobs
- Starring: Mitch Rouse; Connie Britton; Stark Sands; Leah Pipes; Gavin Fink; Aaron Hill; Gregory Hines
- Composer: Ray Colcord
- Country of origin: United States
- Original language: English
- No. of seasons: 1
- No. of episodes: 9 (5 Unaired)

Production
- Executive producers: Michael Jacobs; Tony Jonas; Mark Blutman; David Sacks
- Producer: Mitch Rouse
- Camera setup: Multi-camera
- Running time: 30 minutes
- Production companies: Michael Jacobs Productions; NBC Studios; Touchstone Television

Original release
- Network: ABC
- Release: April 1 – April 22, 2003

Lost at Home is an American sitcom that aired on ABC from April 1 to April 22, 2003. The show was produced by Michael Jacobs Productions, NBC Studios and Touchstone Television, and starred Mitch Rouse, Connie Britton, Gregory Hines (in his final television role), Stark Sands, Leah Pipes, Gavin Fink and Aaron Hill. The show was cancelled after only four episodes.

== Cast ==
- Mitch Rouse as Michael Davis
- Connie Britton as Rachel Davis, Michael's wife
- Stark Sands as Will Davis, Michael & Rachel's son
- Leah Pipes as Sarah Davis, Michael & Rachel's daughter
- Gavin Fink as Josh Davis, Michael & Rachel's son
- Aaron Hill as Tucker
- Gregory Hines as Jordan King

== Episodes ==
No.	Title	Directed by	Written by	Original release date	U.S. viewers (millions)
1	"Pilot"	Andy Cadiff	Michael Jacobs	April 1, 2003	8.44
Michael's wife tells him that he's out of touch with her and the kids.
2	"One Bracelet Don't Feed the Beast"	Andy Cadiff	Mark Blutman	April 8, 2003	7.84
Michael's efforts to help Rachel only reveal his ineptitude.
3	"Good Will Hunting"	Andy Cadiff	David Sacks	April 15, 2003	6.84
Will's turning to Rachel for advice on car buying doesn't sit well with Michael.
4	"Our Town"	Mark Cendrowski	Amy Welsh	April 22, 2003	6.79
Michael tries to help Josh sell seed packets for a school fund-raiser, but a mysterious neighbor foils his plans.
5	"My Skipped Pages"	Brian K. Roberts	Matthew Nelson	Unaired	N/A
6	"The Forgiven"	Brian K. Roberts	Michael Jacobs	Unaired	N/A
Michael forgets his promise to not work on the weekends.
7	"The Story of Us"	Ken Whittingham	Jeff Menell	Unaired	N/A
8	"Best Friends"	Dana DeValley Piazza	Jennifer Fisher	Unaired	N/A
9	"State of the Union"	Fred Savage	Teleplay by : Tiffany Zehnal; Story by : Mitch Rouse	Unaired	N/A
