= Brutally Normal =

American sitcom

- Genre: Sitcom
- Created by: Michael Goldberg; Tommy Swerdlow
- Written by: Stephen Chbosky; Michael Goldberg; Will McRobb; Tommy Swerdlow; Chris Viscardi
- Directed by: Marc Buckland; Michael M. Robin; Lev L. Spiro; Randall Zisk
- Starring: Mike Damus; Lea Moreno; Eddie Kaye Thomas; Tangie Ambrose; Joanna Pacula
- Composers: Stuart Copeland; Ryan Beveridge
- Country of origin: United States
- Original language: English
- No. of seasons: 1
- No. of episodes: 8 (3 unaired)

Production
- Executive producers: Michael Goldberg; Tommy Swerdlow; Greer Shephard; Michael M. Robin
- Camera setup: Film; Single-camera
- Running time: 22 minutes
- Production companies: Swerdlow-Goldberg Style; The Shephard/Robin Company; Touchstone Television

Original release
- Network: The WB
- Release: January 24 – February 14, 2000

Brutally Normal is an American sitcom television series that starred Eddie Kaye Thomas from American Pie and Mike Damus from Teen Angel. It aired on The WB. The series premiered on January 24, 2000 with two back-to-back episodes later airing along with Zoe... A total of eight episodes were produced with only five of those episodes airing with the show being canceled on February 14, 2000.

== Cast ==
=== Main ===
- Mike Damus as Robert "Pooh" Cutler
- Lea Moreno as Anna Pricova
- Eddie Kaye Thomas as Russell Wise
- Tangie Ambrose as Dru
- Joanna Pacula as Gogi Pricova

=== Recurring ===
- Antwon Tanner as Shaheem

== Episodes ==
| No. | Title | Directed by | Written by | Original release date | Prod. code |
|---|---|---|---|---|---|
| 1 | "You Get What You Get" | Marc Buckland | Stephen Chbosky | January 24, 2000 | N-602 |
| 2 | "Barricade" | Marc Buckland | Will McRobb & Chris Viscardi | January 24, 2000 | N-605 |
| 3 | "Mouth Full of Warm Roses" | Michael M. Robin | Tommy Swerdlow & Michael Goldberg | January 31, 2000 | N-603 |
| 4 | "Stretching Ethics" | Marc Buckland | Tommy Swerdlow & Michael Goldberg | February 7, 2000 | N-606 |
| 5 | "Well Solved Sherlock" | Lev L. Spiro | Stephen Chbosky | February 14, 2000 | N-604 |
| 6 | "Damaged Goods" | Randall Zisk | N/A | Unaired | N-607 |
| 7 | "Road Trip" | N/A | N/A | Unaired | N-608 |
| 8 | "Pilot" | N/A | N/A | Unaired | N-601 |
