= My Guys =

- Genre: Sitcom
- Created by: Paul Perlove
- Starring: Michael Rispoli; Mike Damus; Francis Capra; Sherie Scott; Marisol Nichols
- Composer: George Englund Jr.
- Country of origin: United States
- Original language: English
- No. of seasons: 1
- No. of episodes: 6 (4 unaired)

Production
- Production companies: Cherp Productions; Witt/Thomas Productions; Warner Bros. Television

Original release
- Network: CBS
- Release: April 3 – April 10, 1996

My Guys is an American sitcom. It aired on CBS on Wednesday nights for four weeks from April 3, 1996 to April 10, 1996.

== Premise ==
The series centered on Sonny DeMarco, a widower who ran a limousine company, and who was raising two sons on Manhattan's Upper West Side.

== Cast ==
- Michael Rispoli as Sonny DeMarco
- Mike Damus as Michael DeMarco
- Francis Capra as Francis DeMarco
- Marisol Nichols as Angela
- Sherie Scott as Dori
- Peter Dobson as Harvey

== Episodes ==
No.	Title	Directed by	Written by	Original release date	Prod. code
1	"Pilot"	Ted Wass	Paul Perlove	April 3, 1996	001
2	"Tangled Web"	Ted Wass	Kell Cahoon & Tom Saunders	April 10, 1996	005
3	"The Sign"	Ted Wass	Paul Perlove	Unaired	006
4	"Like Father, Like Sonny"	Ted Wass	Jenny Bicks & Kell Cahoon & Tom Saunders	Unaired	002
5	"Five Liars and a Funeral"	Ted Wass	Dee LaDuke & Mark Brown	Unaired	003
6	"Hot and Bothered"	Ted Wass	Robert Leighton	Unaired	004
