= Men, Women & Dogs =

American television sitcom

- Genre: Comedy
- Created by: Rob Long; Dan Staley
- Starring: Bill Bellamy; Danny Pino; Niklaus Lange; Mike Damus; Heather Stephens
- Composer: Marc Bonilla
- Country of origin: United States
- Original language: English
- No. of seasons: 1
- No. of episodes: 13 (4 unaired)

Production
- Executive producers: Dan Staley; Rob Long
- Producer: Bill Bellamy
- Running time: 30 minutes
- Production companies: Staley-Long Productions; Paramount Network Television

Original release
- Network: The WB
- Release: October 14 – December 30, 2001

Men, Women & Dogs is an American television sitcom starring Bill Bellamy. The series premiered October 14, 2001 on The WB.

== Plot ==
The series centered on four guys who meet every day with their dogs in a Los Angeles dog park. Among those shown were Jeremiah, a chef, Clay, Jermiah's best friend, Eric, a surfer, and Royce, who didn't have a dog but thought the dog park was a good place to meet girls.

== Cast ==
- Bill Bellamy as Jeremiah
- Danny Pino as Clay
- Niklaus Lange as Eric
- Mike Damus as Royce
- Heather Stephens as Michelle
- Leigh Evans as Jackie
- Brian Suder as Thomas
- Tracey Cherelle Jones as Nina

== Episodes ==
No.	Title	Directed by	Written by	Original release date	Prod. code
1	"Pilot"	John Whitesell	Rob Long & Dan Staley	October 14, 2001	40342-001
2	"Sick as a Dog"	John Whitesell	Nicole Avril	October 21, 2001	40342-004
3	"A Bone of Contention"	Unknown	Unknown	October 28, 2001	40342-005
4	"A Bulldog Scorned"	Unknown	Unknown	November 4, 2001	40342-007
5	"Let Sleeping Dogs Lie"	Unknown	Unknown	November 11, 2001	40342-003
6	"Kibbles & Grits"	Unknown	Unknown	December 2, 2001	40342-009
7	"Old Dogs, New Tricks"	Unknown	Unknown	December 9, 2001	40342-002
8	"Dog Day Afternoon and Night"	Unknown	Unknown	December 16, 2001	40342-008
9	"A Fetching New Lawyer"	Unknown	Unknown	December 30, 2001	40342-010
10	"Top Dog"	TBD	TBD	Unaired	40342-006
11	"Chew Toy"	TBD	TBD	Unaired	40342-011
12	"The Magic Three-Legged Sex Dog"	TBD	TBD	Unaired	40342-012
13	"Cheese Dog"	TBD	TBD	Unaired	40342-013

== Reception ==
Ken Tucker of Entertainment Weekly described the series as the "most insultingly moronic, sniggering sitcom of the year".
