= Susan Estelle Jansen =

American television producer and writer

- Born: Susan Estelle Jansen Corbett
- Occupation(s): Producer, writer
- Years active: 1991–present

Susan Estelle Jansen Corbett is an American television producer and writer.

Her credits include Home Improvement, Boy Meets World, Maybe This Time and You Wish.

Her film screenplay credits include The Lizzie McGuire Movie and Bratz. She followed with the story for ABC Family film The Cutting Edge: Chasing the Dream.

She is a graduate of Harvard University and USC School of Cinematic Arts.
