= Gavin Fink =

American actor (born 1992)

- Born: September 19, 1992 (age 32); Newport Beach, California, U.S.
- Occupation: actor

Gavin Gerald Fink (born September 19, 1992) is an American actor. He has been working since the age of four, when he was signed by the Ford Modeling Agency and hired for the first job he ever tried out for, a Pepsi ad. Fink has appeared in Megiddo: The Omega Code 2, directed by Brian Trenchard-Smith, and View from the Top, directed by Bruno Barreto. Finks's main role as a child actor was Charlie Holton in Prancer Returns.

Fink has also appeared on episodes of Family Law, The X-Files, Roswell, That's Life, Walker Texas Ranger, and 3rd Rock from the Sun. He also worked on a series in development for PAX TV called Happy Wife, Happy Life and also, Roswell and Lost at Home. In addition, he has been featured in theatrical productions of Fiddler on the Roof, Li'l Abner, and Bye Bye Birdie.
