= Trust Me (American TV series) =

- Genre: Drama
- Created by: Hunt Baldwin; John Coveny
- Written by: Hunt Baldwin; John Coveny; Joy Gregory; John Hlavin; Peter Noah; Angela Russo; Rob Ulin
- Directed by: Ciaran Connelly; Scott Ellis; Nelson McCormick; Michael M. Robin; Greer Shephard; Rick Wallace; Scott Winant; Andy Wolk; Craig Zisk
- Starring: Tom Cavanagh; Eric McCormack
- Ending theme: "Today" by The Smashing Pumpkins
- Composer: Rob Cairns
- Country of origin: United States
- No. of seasons: 1
- No. of episodes: 13

Production
- Executive producers: Hunt Baldwin; John Coveny; Michael M. Robin; Greer Shephard
- Producers: Ronald Chong; Chris Donahue; Whit Friese; Patrick McKee; Peter Noah; Michael Weiss
- Cinematography: Brian J. Reynolds
- Editors: Eli Nilsen; Brian Anton; Lawrence Jordan
- Running time: 60 minutes
- Production companies: The Shephard/Robin Company; Warner Horizon Television

Original release
- Network: TNT
- Release: January 26 – April 7, 2009

Trust Me is an American drama series created by Hunt Baldwin and John Coveny that aired on TNT from January 26 to April 7, 2009. On April 10, 2009, TNT canceled the series after one season.

== Synopsis ==
The series revolves around Rothman, Greene, and Moore, a fictional advertising firm. The storylines center on the difficulties of securing accounts and the characters' personal lives.

== Cast ==
- Tom Cavanagh as Conner, the firm's brilliant but irresponsible ad copywriter who began his partnership less than a decade ago with Mason. Twitchy Conner is a bachelor with a checkered history of failed romances and a growing debt to the company which he incurred by abusing the expense account.
- Eric McCormack as Mason McGuire, the firm's newly promoted Creative Director and straitlaced family man. Mason's levelheaded nature often counteracts Conner's unpredictable behavior even though Mason is highly neurotic. He works well with Conner because of their work ethic but he has workaholic tendencies that affect his marriage.
- Geoffrey Arend as Hector Culligan, one of the firm's idealistic young ad men who shares office space with colleague and best friend Mike, with whom he used to play Xbox games. Hector is known for celebrity impersonations.
- Sarah Clarke as Erin McGuire, Mason's wife and mother to their son and daughter. She tolerates Mason's workaholic tendencies.
- Mike Damus as Tom Fuller, Hector's colleague and one half of their team. He has been dating someone in their company.
- Griffin Dunne as Tony Mink, the firm's boss who had a tendency to break promises in the wake of business, but still maintains a healthy relationship with his employees, primarily Mason.
- Monica Potter as Sarah Krajicek-Hunter, the new hire and ad copywriter who regrets her hiring at the company. She is divorced and later finds out that her former husband is gay. She seems to be attracted to Conner.

== Episodes ==
No.	Title	Directed by	Written by	Original release date
1	"Before and After"	Michael M. Robin	Hunt Baldwin & John Coveny	January 26, 2009
2	"All Hell the Victors"	Michael M. Robin	Hunt Baldwin & John Coveny	February 2, 2009
3	"But Wait, There's More"	Unknown	Unknown	February 9, 2009
4	"Au Courant"	Unknown	Rob Ulin	February 16, 2009
5	"Way Beyond the Call"	Unknown	Unknown	February 23, 2009
6	"Promises Promises"	Unknown	Unknown	March 3, 2009
7	"Damage Control"	Unknown	Unknown	March 10, 2009
8	"What's the Rush"	Unknown	Unknown	March 17, 2009
9	"Odd Man Out"	Unknown	Rob Ulin	March 17, 2009
10	"Thanks, I Needed That"	Unknown	Unknown	March 31, 2009
11	"Norming"	Michael M. Robin	Story by : Joy Gregory; Teleplay by : Joy Gregory & Rob Ulin	March 31, 2009
12	"You Got Chocolate in My Peanut Butter"	Unknown	Unknown	April 7, 2009
13	"The More Things Change"	Unknown	Unknown	April 7, 2009
