= Maybe I Do =

2023 film by Michael Jacobs

- Theatrical release poster
- Directed by: Michael Jacobs
- Screenplay by: Michael Jacobs
- Based on: Cheaters by Michael Jacobs
- Produced by: Vincent Newman; Michael Jacobs; Scott Mednick
- Starring: Diane Keaton; Richard Gere; Susan Sarandon; Emma Roberts; Luke Bracey; William H. Macy
- Cinematography: Tim Suhrstedt
- Edited by: Erica Freed Marker
- Music by: Lesley Barber
- Production companies: Fifth Season; Vincent Newman Entertainment
- Distributed by: Vertical Entertainment
- Release date: January 25, 2023
- Running time: 95 minutes
- Country: United States
- Language: English
- Box office: $4.5 million

Maybe I Do is a 2023 American romantic comedy film written and directed by Michael Jacobs, based on his own play Cheaters, and starring Diane Keaton, Richard Gere, Susan Sarandon, Emma Roberts, Luke Bracey, and William H. Macy. It is Jacobs' feature directorial debut.

When young couple Michelle and Allen finally decide to have their parents meet to talk about marriage, they discover they already know each another well, leading to some differing opinions about it.

== Plot ==
Sam and Grace meet in a movie theatre, both having gone to the Swedish film alone. Afterwards, they contemplate having sex in a cheap motel. Eventually they get fast food and beer, taking it to the room, but instead spend the evening walking and talking.

Howard and Monica are in a hotel, having been having an affair for four months, as he is married to someone else. He wants to end it, so she gives him thinly veiled threats, but he leaves nonetheless.

Michelle and Allen are attending a wedding, where he intercepts the bouquet so she cannot catch it. She had fantasized it being the idyllic start to their perfect future together. Back at their apartment, Michelle changes clothes, gives Allen a 24-hour ultimatum, and walks out.

Howard goes into a coffee shop after leaving Monica. There, he and a waitress observe a young couple, causing him to miss his youth. While leaving, Monica points out how to a young hotel clerk how quickly people age.

Going home, Howard finds his wife Grace in the living room. After an awkward conversation, their daughter Michelle comes in. She brings up the ultimatum she dropped on Allen, which her mother fully supports. Allen similarly tells his parents Sam and Monica, and his dad is in favor of a wedding while Monica is not.

The next morning, the religious Grace is watching a sermon on TV about infidelity. Admitting guilt, She talks back to it. When Howard overhears, he sneaks out of the kitchen.

The two sets of parents continue talking to their respective children about marriage. Both of Michelle's talk about the importance of wedding rings, symbolizing commitment; the irony is both are hiding betrayal and guilt and neither is wearing theirs. Howard and Grace are surprised that the sets of parents have never met, so they get Michelle to invite Allen and his parents to dinner. Sam accepts although Monica is not enthusiastic.

When Allen and his parents arrive, there is extreme awkwardness, although the double affairs are still secret. Monica goes with Howard to get the drinks, and continues to threaten him. Grace walks outside under the guise of showing Sam the house grounds. There, he tries to convince her they have a strong connection, that it was fate, and that they need to pursue a relationship. Grace wants to fight for her marriage.

Michelle and Allen continue talking the pros and cons of getting married. The conversation ends with her concluding that his negative view of marriage is based on his parents’ failing relationship. In front of all four parents, Michelle asks Allen to trust in the now, to not fear that things could end badly and take a leap of faith with her.

Michelle leaves the room, and Allen soon follows after encouragement from both fathers. Left alone, Monica starts to reveal her affair with Howard. However, Grace and Sam guiltily confess about meeting up the previous night, and Monica smugly talks about her affair with Howard, who then begs Grace for forgiveness.

Upset, Grace goes outside, while Sam and Howard compare info about their infidelities. Howard explains that theirs was purely physical whereas Sam explains theirs was purely cerebral. They start to fistfight, but soon are hugging. Howard considers both his wife and Sam are better people than him. Monica follows Grace and insists Howard was never that lost and that their marriage could still be saved.

The men join them outside. Howard says it was the last and only time he cheated on her, which Monica corroborates. Grace is hurt that he had sought solace in another's arms, rather than talking with her. When she leaves in tears, Sam encourages Howard to go after her as he believes her best possible happy ending is with him.

Sam and Monica start talking once they are alone. He had always felt she is more interesting than him, that she is an unstoppable force, and he has stayed because of their son. Meeting Grace, he now sees he could love again.

Michelle and Allen write their own vows and marry. Afterwards we see Sam and Monica have parted ways, while Howard and Grace have rediscovered their passion for each other.

== Cast ==
- Diane Keaton as Grace
- William H. Macy as Sam
- Richard Gere as Howard
- Susan Sarandon as Monica
- Emma Roberts as Michelle
- Luke Bracey as Allen
- Michael Kostroff as Manny
- John Rothman as the neighbor next door
- James Monroe Iglehart as the minister

== Production ==
Principal photography occurred in February and March 2022 in Montclair and Cranford, New Jersey.

== Release ==
In November 2022, it was announced that Vertical Entertainment acquired North American rights to the film, which was released on January 25, 2023.

== Reception ==
On the review aggregator website Rotten Tomatoes, 31% of 48 critics' reviews are positive, with an average rating of 4.8/10. The website's consensus reads: "Its title leaves plenty of room for doubt, but don't be fooled: Despite its impressive cast, Maybe I Do is a definitively subpar rom-com." Metacritic, which uses a weighted average, assigned the film a score of 42 out of 100, based on 10 critics, indicating "mixed or average" reviews.
