= Mike Damus =

American actor

- Born: Michael Paul Damus; September 30, 1979 (age 47); Queens, New York, U.S.
- Occupation: Actor
- Years active: 1993–present

Michael Paul Damus (born September 30, 1979) is an American actor. He is best known for his starring role as Marty DePolo on the ABC sitcom Teen Angel and co-starring in the film Lost in Yonkers. In addition, Damus also co-starred in Men, Women & Dogs and the TNT series Trust Me. He studied history at UCLA.

== Filmography ==
Film and television
Year	Title	Role	Notes
1993	Lost in Yonkers	Arty	Columbia Pictures
1995	A Pig's Tale	Frank Capulski	Propaganda Films
1995	Paradise	Derrick	TV pilot
1996	The Faculty	Zack Randall	TV series, 1 episode
1996	My Guys	Michael DeMarco	TV series, 9 episodes
1997–1998	Teen Angel	Marty DePolo	TV series, 22 episodes
1998	Weird Science	Doomsday Member	TV series, 1 episode
2000	Brutally Normal	Pooh	TV series, 8 episodes
2000	Popular	Clarence	TV series, 3 episodes
2001–2002	Men, Women & Dogs	Royce	TV series, 13 episodes
2003	So Downtown	Ricky	TV Pilot
2004	The Big House	Blake	TV series, 1 episode
2005	Joan of Arcadia	Johnny Broadway	TV series, 1 episode
2005	Numbers	Remy Logan	TV series, 1 episode
2007–2009	Trust Me	Tom Fuller	TV series, 13 episodes
2012	Shotgun Wedding	Robert	20th Century Fox / Netflix
2013	Mad Men	Barry	TV series, 1 episode
2014	Beach Pillows	Ditto	Walls Farm Productions
2016	Longmire	Tom Fowler	TV series, 1 episode
2016	Documentary Now!	Dr. Jan	TV series, 1 episode
2018	Westworld	Tech	TV series 1 episode
