= Teen Angel (1997 TV series) =

- Genre: Fantasy sitcom
- Created by: Al Jean; Mike Reiss
- Starring: Mike Damus; Jordan Brower; Corbin Allred; Conchata Ferrell; Katie Volding; Maureen McCormick; Ron Glass
- Composer: Jeff Rona
- Country of origin: United States
- Original language: English
- No. of seasons: 1
- No. of episodes: 17

Production
- Executive producers: Al Jean; Mike Reiss
- Producer: Brian J. Cowan
- Cinematography: Charles R. Conkilin Jr.; Donald A. Morgan
- Editor: John Neal
- Camera setup: Multi-camera
- Running time: 22–24 minutes
- Production companies: Spooky Magic Productions; Touchstone Television

Original release
- Network: ABC
- Release: September 26, 1997 – February 13, 1998

Teen Angel is an American fantasy sitcom that aired as part of ABC's TGIF Friday night lineup from September 26, 1997, to February 13, 1998. It stars Corbin Allred as a high school student whose recently deceased best friend, played by Mike Damus, returns to earth as his guardian angel. The series was written and produced by Al Jean and Mike Reiss, who are mostly known for their work on The Simpsons.

== Synopsis ==
Teen Angel follows an unpopular high school boy, Steve Beauchamp (Corbin Allred), and his recently deceased best friend, Marty DePolo (Mike Damus), who dies from a foodborne illness after eating a six-month-old hamburger from under Steve's bed on a dare and is then sent back to Earth as Steve's guardian angel by Rod (Ron Glass), who identifies himself as God's cousin and acts as Marty's guide. Rod is portrayed as a large disembodied head, and is mistaken for God himself numerous times in the series.

Marty, as a supernatural being, frequently breaks the fourth wall. For instance, prior to the opening credits of the episode "Grumpy Young Men", Marty explains the absence of Steve's mother and the return of his father to the viewers.

== Recast, reception and cancellation ==
In the show's original pilot, Jordan Brower played the role of Steve. Corbin Allred was ultimately given the part, and Brower was reassigned to portraying cool classmate Jordan Lubell, but retained star billing.

The series was created and placed in the TGIF lineup by ABC in an attempt to capitalize on the success of another ABC supernatural series, Sabrina the Teenage Witch. Along with Sabrina and the also-new You Wish, Teen Angel was one of three supernatural-themed sitcoms on the TGIF block that season.

At the time of the series airing, TGIF had already begun to decline (as a result of direct competition against the CBS Block Party during that season and the new Disney ownership). You Wish was canceled after only 13 episodes, and while Teen Angel lasted more or less a full season, it was also canceled after 17 episodes.

== International Release ==
Teen Angel was aired in 9 languages, with official voice-overs for 7 languages.

The international release switched the release of the American episode 5 “Honest Abe And Popular Steve” and the 4^{th} episode “Wrestling With An Angel" and moved episode 14 “The Play's The Thing” to the 10^{th} episode, followed by “Living Doll” and “Steve & Marty & Jordan & Uncle Lou”. Episode 17 "Look Ma No Face", and episode 16 “The Un-Natural" also had their airing order switched, and episode 15 "Back To DePolo" was moved to the end of the season

== Cast ==
Teen Angel promo shot of Corbin Allred and Mike Damus

=== Main cast ===
- Mike Damus as Marty DePolo, Steve’s best friend and guardian angel
- Jordan Brower as Jorden Lubell, Steve’s cool classmate
- Corbin Allred as Steve Beauchamp, Marty's best friend
- Conchata Ferrell as Aunt Pam
- Katie Volding as Katie Beauchamp, Steve’s little sister
- Maureen McCormick as Judy Beauchamp, Steve's Mother (episodes 1–11)
- Ron Glass as Rod, God's Cousin
- Tommy Hinkley as Casey Beauchamp, Steve's Dad (episodes 12–17)
- Jerry Van Dyke as Grandpa Jerry Beauchamp (episodes 12–17)

=== Supporting cast ===
- Mark Metcalf as Mr Nitzke, Steve's history teacher
- Bridget Flanery as Jessica Fishman
- Adam Kaiz as Kenny Finkleman
- James Theil and Jeff Theil as Twins #1 and #2
- Maurice LaMarche as Principal Crawford / Teddy Bear / Various Announcers

== Episodes ==
No.	Title	Directed by	Written by	Original release date	Prod. code	Viewers (millions)
1	"Marty Buys the Farm"	Andy Cadiff	Al Jean & Mike Reiss	September 26, 1997	T102	13.34
Marty passes on after eating a 6-month-old burger under Steve's bed. Steve goes into a deep depression, since not only is his best friend gone, but his father has recently left, and he's picked on constantly at school. His mother, sister, and aunt attempt to help, but God's cousin, Rod, sends Marty to Steve as his guardian angel, or "Teen Angel", as Marty dubs himself. Marty helps Steve conquer his fear of talking to girls, failing tests, and being unpopular.
2	"Date With an Angel"	Andy Cadiff	Michael Price	October 3, 1997	T103	10.38
Steve has a crush on one of the most popular cheerleaders, Jessica Fishman (Bridget Flanery). But Marty is afraid she'll reject him, so when Steve calls her, Marty pretends to be Jessica and sets up a date with Steve. To save face, Marty morphs into Jessica for the date, and chaos ensues when the real Jessica turns up.
3	"Sings Like an Angel"	Andy Cadiff	Larry Wilmore	October 10, 1997	T104	10.20
As a joke, Marty grants Steve a beautiful singing voice for choir tryouts. Soon Steve has almost every solo or duet part and the prettiest duet partner, Edie. But during the huge talent competition, Marty is called upon to help an old woman to a better place and can't be there for Steve or his voice.
4	"Wrestling with an Angel"	Gary Halvorson	Steve Leff	October 17, 1997	T106	9.22
Wishing to seem more powerful, Steve tries out for the wrestling team. Unwilling to let his friend be pummeled, Marty wins the match for him. When the whole school is counting on Steve to win, Steve is counting on Marty to help him out.
5	"Honest Abe and Popular Steve"	Brian K. Roberts	Bill Freiberger	October 24, 1997	T105	10.67
Marty starts bringing in historical figures to help Steve with his life (Abraham Lincoln to write his history papers, Cleopatra to give him love advice so he can date Homecoming Queen Amy Kosover, Pablo Picasso to design "Steve for Class President" campaign posters, etc.) Rod decides that since Marty has done such a good job with Steve that it's time for him to move on to famous jerk rock star, Sammy Noah (Dee Snider).
6	"I Love Nitzke"	Gary Halvorson	Michael Price	October 31, 1997	T107	9.75
In an attempt to make Aunt Pam like Mr. Nitzke, Steve's driver's ed instructor, Marty swipes some of Cupid's arrows. However, his poor aim causes Judy, Pam, and Katie to all fall for Mr. Nitzke, making Steve uncomfortable when they all insist on coming to the Halloween Dance with him.
7	"One Dog Night"	Gary Halvorson	Michael Price	November 7, 1997	T108	11.48
Sabrina Spellman (played by Melissa Joan Hart) tracks down her cat, Salem, who has swallowed her magic "time ball" to blast everyone back to 1976 (the 1970s). Meanwhile, Judy is bemoaning the lack of a man in her life, but when Marty turns the family dog into the loyal and loving "Bob", she gets more than she asked for. And, Marty tries to create his own magic with Sabrina. This episode concludes a time-travel-themed crossover with Sabrina the Teenage Witch, Boy Meets World and You Wish that begins on "Inna Gadda Sabrina" and continues on "No Guts, No Cory" and "Genie Without a Cause".
8	"Jeremiah was a Bullfrog"	Brian K. Roberts	Steve Baldikoski & Bryan Behar	November 14, 1997	T109	11.78
Marty gives Steve's science class frog the power of speech -- with a British accent (Tim Curry) -- and the two become attached to their amphibian friend. But when his new biology teacher (Yeardley Smith) insists he must dissect his frog or fail the class, Steve is put into a very tight situation.
9	"Feather's Day"	Brian K. Roberts	William B. Keating	November 28, 1997	T110	10.89
Katie's troop is camping, and she has lost her required tribal feather. Steve snags one of Marty's wing feathers when Marty's not looking to give Katie. What he doesn't know is the feather grants the holder anything they desire. Zachery Ty Bryan appears as himself, when Katie's friend wishes for it.
10	"Steve & Marty & Jordan & Uncle Lou"	Mark Cendrowski	Steve Baldikoski & Bryan Behar	December 5, 1997	T113	10.39
Marty wants to tag along wherever Steve goes with new best pal, Jordan. But when Steve insists he not, Marty reunites with his Uncle Lou (Robert Costanzo) in Heaven.
11	"Living Doll"	Mark Cendrowski	Mark J. Gordon	December 19, 1997	T112	9.32
Marty brings Katie's doll to life to babysit her when Steve has a date, but there's trouble when Katie's doll is over-affectionate with Steve in front of his girl.
12	"Grumpy Young Men"	Mark Cendrowski	Steve Leff & Saladin K. Patterson	January 9, 1998	T114	11.23
Steve's mom has left, and Steve's dad, Casey (Tommy Hinkley), has rejoined the family, bringing along his father (Jerry Van Dyke). Steve tries to sneak into a dance club, with the help of a Marty-grown mustache, but in the morning the mustache continues to expand, and Steve ages considerably. Meanwhile, Marty discovers that Grandpa can see him.
13	"Who's the Boss"	Mark Cendrowski	Steve Leff	January 16, 1998	T115	10.74
When Katie, Pam, and Casey are gone for the weekend, Steve throws a 16th birthday party for Marty, inviting friends, and Marty inviting dead celebrities. The family, however, comes home early to a mess, and Steve learns a lesson about telling the truth.
14	"The Play's the Thing"	Mark Cendrowski	Saladin K. Patterson	January 23, 1998	T111	11.07
Life gets tenser for those around Steve, as they are seeing more of him appearing to talk to thin air, when Marty helps Steve get the lead in the school play.
15	"Back to DePolo"	Mark Cendrowski	Bill Freiberger	January 30, 1998	T117	10.80
Marty discovers he can time travel and attempts to stop himself from eating the "Death Burger". But when he doesn't, Steve calls him a chicken, and eats the burger himself. Repeated attempts to keep the burger away fail, and soon everyone in the whole house has eaten it once.
16	"The Un-Natural"	Mark Cendrowski	Mark J. Gordon & Saladin K. Patterson	February 6, 1998	T118	11.06
Marty gives Casey a perfect pitch at a carnival toss, convincing the former pitcher erroneously that he's still got "the gift" and leading him to try out for a pro baseball team. Marty also reunites Grandpa with Grandma (Beverly Garland), who's in heaven, so Grandpa can finally move on.
17	"Look Ma, No Face"	Mark Cendrowski	Jim Patterson	February 13, 1998	T116	10.07
Marty finds out that Nia (Irene Ng), the girl he liked when he was living, liked him back. He devises a scheme to call himself Vlad from Bulgaria, puts on makeup, a wig, and sunglasses, and pretends to be alive for just one date with Nia. However, Rod has forbidden him from this outing.

== Awards and nominations ==
Year	Award	Category	Recipient	Result
1998	Young Artist Award	Best Family TV Comedy Series	Teen Angel	Nominated
1998	Young Artist Award	Best Performance in a TV Comedy Series – Leading Young Performer	Mike Damus	Nominated
1998	Young Artist Award	Best Performance in a TV Comedy Series – Leading Young Performer	Corbin Allred	Nominated
