= David Trainer =

American television director

David Trainer is an American television director. He is known for directing every episode of the Fox sitcom That '70s Show, with the exception of "That '70s Pilot", which was directed by Terry Hughes instead, and every episode of the Netflix sitcom The Ranch. He also directed the first two seasons of the television show Boy Meets World (also a supervising producer), the 4th and final season of the John Larroquette Show, and 63 episodes of Designing Women (which he also produced).

Among many others, his directing credits also include several episodes of FM, Sabrina the Teenage Witch, Grace Under Fire, Cybill, Anything But Love, My Boys, Hot in Cleveland and Mike & Molly.

He also wrote episodes for the soap opera Ryan's Hope in 1977 and the sitcom Misery Loves Company. which he co-created with Michael Jacobs and Bob Young in 1995.

== Awards ==
Trainer was nominated for three Primetime Emmy Awards for his work on Designing Women from 1989 to 1991.

- 1989 - Outstanding Comedy Series - Designing Women - nominated
- 1990 - Outstanding Comedy Series - Designing Women - nominated
- 1991 - Outstanding Comedy Series - Designing Women - nominated
