= No Soap, Radio (TV series) =

- Created by: Les Alexander; Ron Richards; Richard Smith; Michael Jacobs
- Developed by: Merrill Grant
- Starring: Steve Guttenberg
- Theme music composer: Patricia Kerr
- Country of origin: United States
- Original language: English
- No. of seasons: 1
- No. of episodes: 5

Production
- Executive producer: Mort Lachman
- Producers: Les Alexander; Richard Smith; Bill Richmond
- Running time: 30 minutes
- Production companies: The Alexander Smith Company; Mort Lachman & Associates; Alan Landsburg Productions

Original release
- Network: ABC
- Release: April 15 – May 13, 1982

No Soap, Radio is an American sitcom and sketch comedy that aired on ABC on Thursdays from April 15 until May 13, 1982. Five episodes were broadcast. The five episodes also appeared on the BBC, where the deletion of commercial breaks gave the show an even more rapid-fire look.

The title is taken from a popular 1950s prank where "no soap radio" is given as a non-sequitur punchline to a joke.

== Plot ==
Overall, the plots of No Soap, Radio were very loosely wound and often nonsensical, as with one episode's subplot involving a sentient, man-eating chair. Continuity and plausibility were usually cheerfully ignored, and what continuing story there was in any given episode often centered around the staff at Atlantic City, New Jersey's Pelican Hotel, a former "showplace" that was now somewhat faded. Seen most frequently were Roger, the young, optimistic but sometimes overwhelmed owner/manager; Karen, his sunny, capable assistant (replacing Sharon, who only appeared in the pilot); and Tuttle, the villainous house detective who was desperate to have Roger sell the hotel. There were also several residents of the hotel who were featured, including the ebullient Mr. Plitzky, the determinedly perky Marion, and chronic complainer Mrs. Belmont.

Somewhat inspired by Monty Python's Flying Circus, each episode of No Soap, Radio was filled with sight gags, blackouts, and non-sequiturs. The show would frequently cut away to "Special Reports" right in the middle of a scene, with a fictitious news anchor detailing an improbable story. At other times, characters would watch a television commercial that would suddenly become the focus of a scene. Still other times, doors within the hotel might be opened to reveal any sort of environment from a business to a national park, and entire scenes would play out in these "hotel rooms" with no seeming connection to the main plot.

== Cast ==
- Steve Guttenberg as Roger
- Hillary B. Smith as Karen
- Stuart Pankin as Tuttle
- Bill Dana as Mr. Plitzky
- Fran Ryan as Mrs. Belmont
- Edie McClurg as Marion
- Jerry Maren as Morris
- Bruce Glover as Interviewer (Season 1, 1982)

== Episodes ==
No.	Title	Directed by	Written by	Original release date
1	"Pilot"	John Robins	Les Alexander, Ron Richards, Richard Smith & Michael Jacobs	April 15, 1982
2	"Carmine the Squealer"	Bill Hobin	Merrill Grant	April 22, 1982
3	"Karen Fools Around"	Bill Hobin	Bill Richmond, Ron Richards & Fred Raker	April 29, 1982
4	"Miss Pelican"	Bill Hobin	Merrill Grant	May 6, 1982
5	"The Bums Rush"	John Robins	Ron Richards, Michael Jacobs, Richard Smith & Les Alexander	May 13, 1982
