= Bob Young (TV producer) =

American television producer (born 1952)

Robert S. Young, Jr. (born August 28, 1952) is an American television producer. He was born in Knoxville, Tennessee, attended college at the University of Pennsylvania and soon after his graduation began working in stand-up comedy in Philadelphia with fellow comedian Bob Myer in a duo called Myer and Young. Once he moved to Los Angeles, he began working in television. Young has worked as both a writer and producer on 11 sitcoms. He lives in Los Angeles with his wife Joan and his three children.

== Television work ==
- Melissa & Joey (2010), writer, producer
- Family Affair (2002), writer, producer
- Nikki (2000), writer, producer
- Smart Guy (1997), writer, producer
- Maybe This Time (1995), writer, producer
- Boy Meets World (1993), writer, producer
- Dinosaurs (1991), writer, producer
- Singer & Sons (1990), writer, producer
- My Two Dads (1987), writer, producer
- 227 (1985), writer, producer
- Who's the Boss? (1984), consultant
- The Facts of Life (1979), writer, producer
