= Marco Zappia =

American television editor

- Born: November 29, 1937; Los Angeles, California, U.S.
- Died: December 22, 2013 (aged 76); Ventura, California, U.S.
- Occupation: Television editor
- Years active: 1968–2007
- Spouse: Carole Ann Lo Presto (m. 1961)
- Children: 2

Marco Zappia (November 29, 1937 – December 22, 2013) was an American television editor. His credits over a career of more than 40 years included All in the Family (95 episodes), Archie Bunker's Place (97 episodes), Who's the Boss? (188 episodes), Home Improvement (203 episodes) and 8 Simple Rules (75 episodes).

Zappia was born on November 29, 1937, in Los Angeles to Italian immigrants Rocco and Anna Zappia. He graduated from Hollywood High School, and married Carole Ann Lo Presto in 1961.

He began his career as a television editor with CBS in 1968, having previously worked as a television repairman. He was nominated for 18 Emmy Awards, winning twice, first for Hee Haw in 1971, and then for the 1980 special Christmas in the Holy Land. He was also a longtime member of the Directors Guild of America, the Motion Pictures Editors Guild, and the Academy of Television Arts and Sciences.
