= Michael Jacobs (producer) =

American film producer (born 1955)

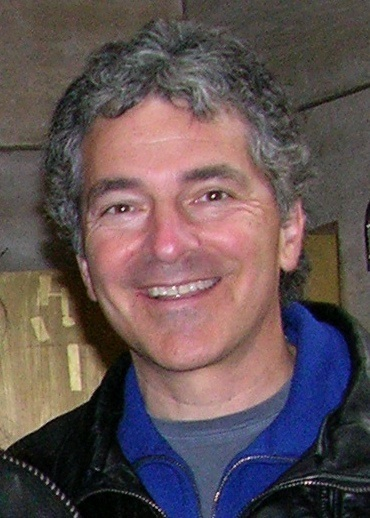
- Jacobs in 2003
- Born: June 28, 1955 (age 71); Highland Park, New Jersey, U.S.
- Occupations: Writer, producer
- Years active: 1982–present

Michael Jacobs (born June 28, 1955) is an American writer and producer whose work has appeared on Broadway, Off Broadway, television and film. He is the creator/producer or has written and developed several television series including Boy Meets World, Dinosaurs, Charles in Charge, My Two Dads, The Torkelsons, and Girl Meets World. His television shows have won the People's Choice, Parent's Choice, Environmental Media Awards, and more.

== Early life ==
Jacobs was born June 28, 1955, in Highland Park, New Jersey. He attended Highland Park High School. Jacobs grew up in New York City, New York; Fort Lauderdale, Florida; and Los Angeles, California.

== Career ==
Jacobs began his career as a writer and an actor. As an actor, he toured with the New Jersey Shakespeare Festival, appeared in a Los Angeles production of Godspell, and made an appearance on the soap-opera Days of Our Lives.

His play, Cheaters, had its premiere in South Florida in 1977, winning the Carbonell Award for "Best New Play." It opened in 1978 at the Biltmore Theatre in New York, starring Doris Roberts, Jack Weston, Lou Jacobi and Rosemary Murphy, when he was twenty-two years old, making him one of the youngest playwrights in Broadway history. His next play, Getting Along Famously was produced off-Broadway in 1984, at the Hudson Guild Theatre. His play, Impressionism opened on Broadway in 2009 at the Gerald Schoenfeld Theatre, starring Jeremy Irons and Joan Allen.

He was nominated for the Academy Award, Golden Globe, National Board of Review and BAFTA Award for Best Film for producing the 1994 motion picture, Quiz Show, which also won the New York Film Critics Circle Award. He won the People's Choice Award (Best New Comedy) for My Two Dads and was nominated for the Emmy Award (Outstanding Children's Program) for Girl Meets World in 2015 and again in 2016, and once again in 2017, which was also nominated for the Humanitas Prize, the WGA Award, the PGA Award, as well as the Kids' Choice Award and Teen Choice Award.

He wrote and directed Maybe I Do, starring Diane Keaton, Richard Gere, Susan Sarandon, William H. Macy, Emma Roberts, and Luke Bracey. It opened in theaters on January 27, 2023, and will begin streaming on Amazon Prime, Apple TV+, YouTube and other premium channels on Valentine's Day.

=== Television ===
His production company, Michael Jacobs Productions, has been in long-term development partnerships with NBCUniversal Television Distribution, Columbia TriStar Television, and Buena Vista Television. His television shows have appeared on ABC, NBC, CBS, Fox, Disney Channel and The WB television networks.

==== Boy Meets World ====
In 2023, Boy Meets World celebrated its 30th anniversary on television, having been broadcast continuously since 1993 on ABC, Disney Channel, and currently on TeenNick and MTV2. Michael and the cast were reunited in June 2013, as the featured panel at the second annual ATX Television Festival in Austin, Texas. He was quoted there as saying, "I don't see anything on television right now that is speaking to the audience I have always spoken to and care very much about." Girl Meets World premiered on June 27, 2014, running for three seasons to substantial success before Disney Channel ended the show, allegedly out of concerns the show's characters were aging out of the channel's target audience.

In 2018, all episodes of Boy Meets World along with Dinosaurs began their run on the streaming service, Hulu. Both Boy Meets World and Girl Meets World have since moved to Disney Plus.

Michael is also the writer or co-writer of the theme songs for Charles in Charge, My Two Dads, The Torkelsons and Lost at Home. He co-wrote Always You, the theme for Maybe I Do with Ruth B. It was released as a single along with the opening of the movie on January 27.

== Film ==
- Maybe I Do (director) (2023)
- As Seen Through These Eyes (Documentary) (2007)
- Quiz Show (1994)

== Television ==
- Girl Meets World (Disney Channel; 2014–2017)
- Lost at Home (ABC; 2003)
- Zoe, Duncan, Jack and Jane (WB; 1999–2000)
- You Wish (ABC; 1997–1998)
- Maybe This Time (ABC; 1995–1996)
- Misery Loves Company (FOX; 1995–1996)
- Boy Meets World (ABC; 1993–2000)
- Where I Live (ABC; 1993–1994)
- Dinosaurs (ABC; 1991–1994)
- The Torkelsons/Almost Home (NBC; 1991–1993)
- Singer & Sons (NBC; 1990)
- My Two Dads (NBC; 1987–1990)
- Together We Stand (CBS; 1986–1987)
- Charles in Charge (CBS; 1984–1985; Syndicated; 1987–1990)
- No Soap, Radio (ABC; 1982)

== Theatre ==
- Cheaters (Biltmore Theatre) 1978
- Getting Along Famously (Hudson Guild Theatre) 1984
- Impressionism (Gerald Schoenfeld Theatre) 2009

== Awards and nominations ==
Year	Title	Award	Won/Nominated
1988	My Two Dads	People's Choice Awards (Favorite New TV Comedy Program)	Won
1991	Dinosaurs	TCA Award (Outstanding Achievement in Children's Programming)	Nominated
1992	Dinosaurs	Kid's Choice Award (Favorite TV Show)	Won
1992	Dinosaurs	Environmental Media Award (TV Comedy)	Won
1993	Dinosaurs	Environmental Media Award (TV Comedy)	Won
1994	Quiz Show	Academy Award for Best Picture	Nominated
1994	Quiz Show	Golden Globe Award (Best Motion Picture)	Nominated
1994	Quiz Show	BAFTA Award for Best Film	Nominated
1994	Quiz Show	New York Film Critics Circle Awards (Best Film)	Won
1995	Dinosaurs	Environmental Media Award (TV Comedy)	Won
1999	Boy Meets World	Kid's Choice Award (Favorite TV Show)	Nominated
2000	Boy Meets World	Kid's Choice Award (Favorite TV Show)	Nominated
2014	Girl Meets World	Teen Choice Award (Choice Summer TV Show)	Nominated
2014	Girl Meets World	WGA Award (Children's Script)	Nominated
2015	Girl Meets World	Emmy Award (Outstanding Children's Program)	Nominated
2015	Girl Meets World	WGA Award (Children's Script)	Nominated
2016	Girl Meets World	Emmy Award (Outstanding Children's Program)	Nominated
2016	Girl Meets World	Kid's Choice Award (Favorite TV Show)	Nominated
2016	Girl Meets World	Teen Choice Award (Choice TV: Summer Show)	Nominated
2016	Girl Meets World	WGA Award (Children's Script)	Nominated
2017	Girl Meets World	Emmy Award (Outstanding Children's Program)	Nominated
2017	Girl Meets World	Humanitas Prize	Nominated
2017	Girl Meets World	Kid's Choice Award	Nominated
2017	Girl Meets World	PGA Award (Season 2, Season 3)	Nominated
