= Ray Colcord =

American composer (1949–2016)

- Born: Ray Colcord III; December 24, 1949; New York City, New York, U.S.
- Died: February 5, 2016 (aged 66); Los Angeles, California, U.S.
- Occupation: Composer
- Years active: 1974–2016
- Spouse: Madeleine
- Children: 1

Ray Colcord III (December 24, 1949 – February 5, 2016) was an American film and television composer known for TV series such as 227, Silver Spoons, My Two Dads, Dinosaurs, Big Brother, and Boy Meets World. He is a former governor of the Academy of Television Arts & Sciences, a past President of the Society of Composers & Lyricists, served on the board of directors of the Film Preservation Society and was a member of the National Film Preservation Board. He has received ASCAP, BMI, and Dramalogue awards.

== Life and career ==
Prior to his film and television career, Colcord worked as a session musician and an A&R (Artists & Repertoire) representative for Columbia Records, was responsible for Aerosmith's signing, and co-produced their second album, Get Your Wings. He was the first music director of the Los Angeles improvisational comedy group The Groundlings.

Colcord played keyboards on the Lou Reed live album Rock n Roll Animal (1974). Ray also played keyboards on American Pie, the album by Don McLean.

== Death ==
Colcord died on February 5, 2016, in Los Angeles at the age of 66. He had pancreatic cancer for four years. He was survived by his wife Madeleine, to whom he was married since 1983, and son Alex.

== Film ==
- Killer By Nature
- Resurrection Mary
- Journeys Below the Line: ER - The Prop Masters (video documentary )
- Journeys Below the Line: 24 - The Editing Process (video documentary)
- The King's Guard
- Heartwood
- The Paper Brigade (video)
- Amityville Dollhouse: Evil Never Dies (video)
- Wish Upon a Star
- The Sleeping Car
- The Devonsville Terror - Composer

== Songs ==
- Dumb & Dumber - "Hip Hop Solution", "Rap me Silly", "Endangered Species", "Snow Bird Serenade"
- Lara Croft Tomb Raider: The Cradle of Life - "Bouzouki Trella"
- Earth Girls Are Easy - "I Like 'Em Big And Stupid"
- Dr. Demento 20th Anniversary Collection (video documentary) - "The Homecoming Queen's Got a Gun")

== Television ==
- Lost at Home (TV series)
- Family Affair (TV series)
- Big Brother (TV series)
- Embassy Television/Pay Television/Communications/Telecommunications Theme (1982)
- Style and Substance (TV series)
- Tales from the Tomb: Lost Sons of the Pharaohs (TV documentary)
- You Wish (TV series)
- Hiller and Diller (TV series)
- Promised Land (TV series)
- Devil's Food (TV movie)
- Television's Comedy Classics (TV movie)
- Real Funny (TV movie)
- Wow! The Most Awesome Acts on Earth (TV movie)
- Maybe This Time (TV series)
- 50 Years of Soaps: An All-Star Celebration (TV movie)
- Black Sheep (TV movie)
- Boy Meets World (TV series)
- Girl Meets World (TV series)
- The Charmings (TV series, theme and music for season two)
- Almost Home (TV series)
- Where I Live (TV series)
- Scorch (TV series)
- The Torkelsons (TV series)
- Dinosaurs (TV series)
- The Julie Show (TV movie)
- The Simpsons (TV series)
  - Dead Putting Society
- Singer & Sons (TV series)
- Jury Duty: The Comedy (TV movie)
- Ann Jillian (TV series)
- Live-In (TV series)
- Trial and Error (TV series)
- Women in Prison (TV series)
- My Two Dads (TV series)
- The Charmings (TV series)
- Sweet Surrender (TV series)
- 227 (TV series)
- Double Trouble (TV series)
- Silver Spoons (TV series) - Composer for second half of seasons 4 to 5
- Off Your Rocker (TV movie)
- The Facts of Life (TV series) - Composer for seasons 7 to 9
