= List of Perfect Strangers episodes =

Perfect Strangers is an American sitcom created by Dale McRaven which aired on ABC in the United States. It chronicles the rocky coexistence of Larry Appleton (Mark Linn-Baker) and his distant cousin Balki Bartokomous (Bronson Pinchot).

The show began in the spring of 1986, and concluded with the eighth season in summer 1993. Originally airing on Tuesdays and then Wednesdays in prime time, the show eventually found its niche as an anchor for ABC's original TGIF Friday night lineup.

The series ran for 150 episodes, concluding with the two-part series finale on August 6, 1993.

== Series overview ==
| Season | Episodes | Originally released | | Nielsen ratings |
| Season | Episodes | First released | Last released | Nielsen ratings |
|---|---|---|---|---|
| 1 | 6 | March 25, 1986 | April 29, 1986 | #13 |
| 2 | 22 | September 17, 1986 | May 6, 1987 | #31 |
| 3 | 22 | September 23, 1987 | May 6, 1988 | #48 |
| 4 | 22 | October 14, 1988 | May 5, 1989 | #38 |
| 5 | 24 | September 22, 1989 | May 4, 1990 | #34 |
| 6 | 24 | September 28, 1990 | May 3, 1991 | #32 |
| 7 | 24 | September 20, 1991 | April 18, 1992 | #61 |
| 8 | 6 | July 9, 1993 | August 6, 1993 | #19 |

== Episodes ==
=== Season 1 (1986) ===
| No. overall | No. in season | Title | Directed by | Written by | Original release date | Prod. code | Rating/share (households) |
|---|---|---|---|---|---|---|---|
| 1 | 1 | "Knock Knock, Who's There?" | Joel Zwick | Dale McRaven | March 25, 1986 | 174902 | 21.3/33 |
Larry Appleton of Madison, Wisconsin moves to Chicago to become a photojournalist. Meanwhile, he takes a job at a corner discount store, Ritz Discount, owned by his landlord Mr. Donald Twinkacetti. One night his distant cousin Balki Bartokomous, a shepherd from the Mediterranean island of Mypos, appears on his doorstep. Larry takes him in and helps him get a job at the store, although Twinkie is not happy about it.
| 2 | 2 | "Picture This" | Joel Zwick | William Bickley & Michael Warren | April 1, 1986 | 174901 | 21.3/32 |
Larry attempts to teach the easily manipulated Balki to be more assertive, but it comes back to haunt him, when Balki refuses to aid him in his quest to get a Paparazzi photo of "Dolly Parton" committing adultery, to give to the papers, and potentially advance his journalism career.
| 3 | 3 | "First Date" | Joel Zwick | Marty Nadler | April 8, 1986 | 174903 | 20.5/31 |
Larry takes Balki to a singles bar to teach him how to meet women, but it turns out Balki is the more adept one of the two, in getting a date.
| 4 | 4 | "Baby, You Can Drive My Car" | Howard Storm | Doug Keyes & Chip Keyes | April 15, 1986 | 174904 | 21.0/32 |
Balki wants to get his driver's license. Mr. Twinkacetti doesn't think he can, but Larry is so confident that he can that he bets $50 and offers Balki his car.
| 5 | 5 | "Check This" | Joel Zwick | William Bickley & Michael Warren | April 22, 1986 | 174905 | 20.0/31 |
Larry takes Balki to open a checking account, but problems arise when Balki spends without understanding how it works. Meanwhile, Mr. Twinkacetti wants Larry to cover for him to hide his gambling from his wife. Sam Anderson, who plays bank employee Harrison Harper, would become a regular in season 3 as Mr. Sam Gorpley. This was also the first of five episodes with Belita Moreno as Edwina Twinkacetti, her first of two roles on the show.
| 6 | 6 | "Happy Birthday, Baby" | Joel Zwick | Doug Keyes & Chip Keyes | April 29, 1986 | 174907 | 18.5/31 |
Balki reconsiders throwing Larry a last-minute surprise party on his 24th birthday after he comes home miserable after losing a photo opportunity.

=== Season 2 (1986–87) ===
| No. overall | No. in season | Title | Directed by | Written by | Original release date | Prod. code | Rating/share (households) |
|---|---|---|---|---|---|---|---|
| 7 | 1 | "Hello Baby" | Joel Zwick | Paula A. Roth | September 17, 1986 | 175502 | 17.3/29 |
Balki invites Gina (Candi Milo), a pregnant friend from his citizenship class, to stay with him and Larry while her husband is out of town. Already cranky from sharing the sofa with Balki, Larry panics when he realizes that Gina could go into labor at any moment.
| 8 | 2 | "Hunks Like Us" | Joel Zwick | Alan Mandel | September 24, 1986 | 175504 | 17.4/29 |
Larry and Balki join a health club: Balki to get in shape; Larry when he falls for a fellow member. The guys try to prove that they're jocks, but overdoing their workouts might spell trouble for their potential romances. Debut episode of Melanie Wilson as Jennifer Lyons and Rebeca Arthur as Mary Anne Spencer
| 9 | 3 | "The Unnatural" | Joel Zwick | Paula A. Roth | October 1, 1986 | 175513 | 16.5/28 |
Larry's softball team has a chance of winning the championship--until their star player becomes unavailable. Can Balki help Larry win the coveted trophy? And can Larry overcome his hesitancy and keep his promise to Balki?
| 10 | 4 | "Lifesavers" | Joel Zwick | Jim Parker | October 22, 1986 | 175501 | 16.2/25 |
After Larry saves Balki from getting hit by a taxi, Balki becomes his personal servant, but it soon becomes too much for Larry. So Larry arranges for a "burglar" (Raf Mauro) to break in so Balki can save him.
| 11 | 5 | "Babes in Babylon" | Joel Zwick | Bob Keyes | October 29, 1986 | 175508 | 14.7/24 |
Larry and Balki win a trip to Las Vegas. Larry plans out the whole trip to prevent Balki from hitting the casinos and developing a dangerous habit, but Balki eventually talks him into a quick try at roulette, but Larry ends up becoming addicted to gambling.
| 12 | 6 | "Ladies and Germs" | Joel Zwick | William Bickley & Michael Warren | November 5, 1986 | 175503 | 15.7/24 |
After visiting Mr. Twinkacetti in the hospital, Larry catches a cold just before his date with a beauty queen. Balki offers a secret Myposian cure, which proves to be surprisingly potent.
| 13 | 7 | "Falling in Love Is..." | Joel Zwick | William Bickley & Michael Warren | November 12, 1986 | 175514 | 17.2/26 |
Larry is suspicious of Balki's night-school girlfriend (Karen Lynn Scott), but Balki refuses to believe that she's just using him for a good grade. After ignoring Larry's advice, Balki is dumped.
| 14 | 8 | "Can I Get a Witness" | Joel Zwick | Bob Keyes | November 26, 1986 | 175517 | 14.0/23 |
Balki takes a job delivering packages for a racketeer named Vince Lucas (John Del Regno). After Vince is busted, he and Larry are asked to testify in court, but Vince threatens to kill them if they do.
| 15 | 9 | "Two Men and a Cradle" | Joel Zwick | Paula A. Roth | December 3, 1986 | 175515 | 15.6/25 |
Balki agrees to take care of Gina's baby while she goes away with her husband, but an outing to the park finds them bringing home the wrong baby.
| 16 | 10 | "The Rent Strike" | Joel Zwick | Mark Fink | December 10, 1986 | 175507 | 16.1/25 |
A rent strike Balki and Larry organize to force Twinkacetti to make needed repairs turns into a battle of wills when Twinkie shuts off the utilities. This was Lise Cutter's final episode as Susan Campbell.
| 17 | 11 | "A Christmas Story" | Joel Zwick | Dale McRaven | December 17, 1986 | 175516 | 15.7/25 |
Balki tries to keep Larry merry when a blizzard keeps him from going home to Wisconsin.
| 18 | 12 | "Dog Gone Blues" | Joel Zwick | John B. Collins | January 7, 1987 | 175519 | 17.9/27 |
When Balki brings home a dog--forbidden by their lease--he and Larry plot to keep him secret from Twinkacetti.
| 19 | 13 | "Since I Lost My Baby" | Joel Zwick | Doug Keyes & Chip Keyes | January 14, 1987 | 175506 | 15.7/24 |
Twinkie forgets his wedding anniversary for the 16th time, Edwina kicks him out, and Balki takes him in. But Twinkie makes no effort to reconcile with his wife, so Larry and Balki have to try to get them back together.
| 20 | 14 | "Trouble in Paradise" | Joel Zwick | Mark Fink | January 21, 1987 | 175518 | 16.8/25 |
Larry and Balki invite Jennifer and Mary Anne over for dinner, but don't agree on the menu: Balki wants to serve a Myposian meal.
| 21 | 15 | "Beautiful Dreamer" | Joel Zwick | Paula A. Roth | January 28, 1987 | 175521 | 16.2/24 |
When Balki has trouble sleeping, Larry tries to help him discover the source of his nightmare.
| 22 | 16 | "Tux for Two" | Joel Zwick | Joel Saltzman | February 4, 1987 | 175522 | 15.0/24 |
Larry takes Balki to a black-tie affair for Larry's photographer idol, Roger Morgan (James Greene), whom he wants to impress, but Balki clashes with high society.
| 23 | 17 | "Ten Speed and a Soft Touch" | Joel Zwick | John B. Collins | February 11, 1987 | 175526 | 16.4/25 |
Larry and Balki become 'big brothers' to a troubled teenager (Bobby Jacoby) who is always stealing. They do fine until Larry accuses him of stealing his bike.
| 24 | 18 | "Snow Way to Treat a Lady, Part 1" | Joel Zwick | Howard Adler & Robert Griffard | February 18, 1987 | 175523 | 17.4/27 |
Balki signs himself and Larry up for a group ski vacation. Larry doesn't want to go at first, but when he learns that Jennifer is going, he agrees because he's desperate to impress her.
| 25 | 19 | "Snow Way to Treat a Lady, Part 2" | Joel Zwick | Howard Adler & Robert Griffard | February 25, 1987 | 175524 | 17.2/26 |
In the aftermath of the avalanche, Larry, Balki, Jennifer, and Mary Anne are trapped in a cabin and fearing for their lives. They decide to dig a tunnel to safety.
| 26 | 20 | "Get a Job" | Joel Zwick | Bob Keyes | March 4, 1987 | 175525 | 16.9/26 |
After Twinkie refuses to give them raises, Larry and Balki quit their jobs and end up at a burger joint serving to rowdy hockey fans.
| 27 | 21 | "Hello, Elaine" | Joel Zwick | William Bickley & Michael Warren | April 1, 1987 | 175520 | 16.3/26 |
Larry is appalled when his favorite sister, Elaine (Sue Ball), tells him that she's going to New York to become a professional pianist instead of going to college.
| 28 | 22 | "Up on a Roof" | Joel Zwick | Dale McRaven | May 6, 1987 | 175511 | 13.4/24 |
Larry enters a photo contest with the perfect picture in mind, but to take it, he and Balki must go shoot it from Twinkie's roof before a storm hits. Ernie Sabella makes his final appearance as Mr. Twinkacetti

=== Season 3 (1987–88) ===
| No. overall | No. in season | Title | Directed by | Written by | Original release date | Prod. code | Rating/share (households) |
|---|---|---|---|---|---|---|---|
| 29 | 1 | "All the News That Fits" | Joel Zwick | Howard Adler & Robert Griffard | September 23, 1987 | 176503 | 15.2/27 |
Larry gets a job at the Chicago Chronicle as a reporter and has to write an article by the next morning. He brings Balki in to find a job and Mr. Burns, the city editor, hires him for the mailroom, to the annoyance of mailroom boss Mr. Gorpley, who tries to get him fired. Sam Anderson, who made a guest appearance in the first season, makes his regular-cast debut as Mr. Sam Gorpley. Jo Marie Payton also debuts on the show as elevator operator Harriette Winslow, and Eugene Roche makes his first of four appearances as Larry's boss, Mr. Harry Burns
| 30 | 2 | "Weigh to Go, Buddy" | Joel Zwick | Paula A. Roth | September 30, 1987 | 176501 | 16.3/28 |
When Larry discovers that he has gained 7 pounds, he diets unsuccessfully, prompting Balki to give him a Myposian diet.
| 31 | 3 | "Sexual Harassment in Chicago" | Joel Zwick | Paula A. Roth | October 7, 1987 | 176510 | 17.0/28 |
The editor of the Chronicle's Sunday magazine (Holland Taylor) makes a play for innocent Balki, who is not interested. But she won't take no for an answer and threatens to get Balki fired.
| 32 | 4 | "Taking Stock" | Joel Zwick | John B. Collins | October 14, 1987 | 176504 | 16.8/27 |
After buying one share of stock in a cereal company, Balki discovers that there aren't the advertised number of raisins in a box. He decides to go to head office to complain that the company is cheating the public.
| 33 | 5 | "Your Cheatin' Heart" | Joel Zwick | Howard Adler & Robert Griffard | October 28, 1987 | 176509 | 13.6/21 |
Jennifer and Balki are trying to surprise Larry with a new typewriter, but Larry misunderstands their secretive actions and suspects that they're having an affair.
| 34 | 6 | "The Horn Blows at Midnight" | Joel Zwick | William Bickley & Michael Warren | November 4, 1987 | 176508 | 16.5/27 |
When a famous psychic (Brandis Kemp) visits the Chronicle, she goes into a trance and makes an elaborate prediction ending in Larry's death. Then the first part happens.
| 35 | 7 | "The Karate Kids" | Joel Zwick | James O'Keefe & Alan Plotkin | November 11, 1987 | 176505 | 18.1/28 |
Humiliated after getting roughed up in front of Jennifer, Larry and Balki decide to take karate lessons, but Larry's desire for revenge might be his undoing.
| 36 | 8 | "Night School Confidential" | Joel Zwick | Barry O'Brien | November 18, 1987 | 176514 | 17.5/29 |
Balki is cheated by a con artist (Lee Arenberg) who sells him counterfeit watches; when the police are no help, he and Larry go undercover to expose the crook themselves.
| 37 | 9 | "Future Shock" | Joel Zwick | John B. Collins | November 25, 1987 | 176512 | 13.9/25 |
Jennifer faces a promotion that would send her to Los Angeles, but Larry still can't quite tell her how he feels about her and ask her to stay.
| 38 | 10 | "Couch Potato" | Joel Zwick | Bob Keyes | December 2, 1987 | 176511 | 16.5/28 |
When Larry and Balki get cable TV, an entranced Balki becomes a serious couch potato. Belita Moreno, who appeared as Edwina Twinkacetti in five second season episodes, returns to the show as newspaper advice columnist Lydia Markham.
| 39 | 11 | "The Break-In" | Joel Zwick | Dave Ketchum & Tony DiMarco | December 9, 1987 | 176502 | 13.2/21 |
When Balki accidentally delivers Larry's joke article to the publisher, the two break into his office late at night to retrieve it.
| 40 | 12 | "To Be or Not to Be" | Joel Zwick | Robert Blair | January 6, 1988 | 176516 | 17.3/26 |
Larry and Balki are chosen to be in a commercial for the Chronicle.
| 41 | 13 | "My Lips Are Sealed" | Joel Zwick | Paula A. Roth | January 13, 1988 | 176515 | 18.7/28 |
Larry soon regrets chastising Balki for telling Mr. Gorpley what's in the company's mail when he suddenly must know about his impending raise to buy his dream car.
| 42 | 14 | "The Pen Pal" | Joel Zwick | Bob Keyes | January 27, 1988 | 176517 | 17.1/27 |
Larry fears for his life when Balki invites the just-paroled Vince Lucas—whom the duo testified against—to their apartment.
| 43 | 15 | "Just Desserts" | Joel Zwick | Howard Adler & Robert Griffard | February 3, 1988 | 176518 | 17.1/27 |
After Balki serves Larry, Jennifer, and Mary Anne some "bibi babkas", Larry looks for a way to rush the product into production for a fast profit.
| 44 | 16 | "Better Shop Around" | Joel Zwick | Bob Keyes | February 10, 1988 | 176506 | 16.4/26 |
Balki is thrilled to win a grocery-shopping spree, but Larry plans every purchase in hopes of reselling the goods and buying an air-conditioner.
| 45 | 17 | "Pipe Dreams" | Joel Zwick | Bob Keyes | March 4, 1988 | 176522 | 14.2/24 |
Jennifer asks Larry to get a plumber to fix her showerhead. Larry decides to impress her by fixing it himself--but can he?
| 46 | 18 | "The Defiant Guys" | Joel Zwick | Story by : Michael Mauer; Teleplay by : John B. Collins | March 11, 1988 | 176507 | 12.6/22 |
Larry is not speaking to Balki, so Balki handcuffs them together before Larry's big meeting with the Chronicle publisher—and he doesn't have the key. This was Eugene Roche's last of four episodes as Harry Burns and the debut of F.J. O'Neil as Larry's new boss Mr. Wainwright.
| 47 | 19 | "My Brother, Myself" | Joel Zwick | John B. Collins | March 18, 1988 | 176520 | 12.4/22 |
Hoping to upstage his successful braggart brother Billy (Ted McGinley), Larry fibs about his job at the Chronicle, and dupes Balki into helping.
| 48 | 20 | "You Gotta Have Friends" | Joel Zwick | Howard Adler & Robert Griffard | March 25, 1988 | 176513 | 12.7/23 |
When Balki claims to have met—and loaned money to—Carl Lewis, Larry thinks Balki's been taken advantage of again.
| 49 | 21 | "The Graduate" | Joel Zwick | Robert Blair | April 29, 1988 | 176521 | 11.6/23 |
Larry seeks a way to help after Balki is crestfallen to learn there's no graduation ceremony for his completing night school.
| 50 | 22 | "Bye Bye Biki" | Joel Zwick | William Bickley & Michael Warren | May 6, 1988 | 176519 | 9.8/20 |
Larry has to break bad news to Balki: his centenarian grandmother, whom they'd been expecting to come for a visit, has died en route.

=== Season 4 (1988–89) ===
| No. overall | No. in season | Title | Directed by | Written by | Original release date | Prod. code | Viewers (millions) |
|---|---|---|---|---|---|---|---|
| 51 | 1 | "The Lottery" | Joel Zwick | Howard Adler & Robert Griffard | October 14, 1988 | 177501 | 18.1 |
Larry tries to warn Balki that the lottery is too much of a longshot--then a frantic search ensues when Balki's lost ticket just might have won him the $28-million jackpot.
| 52 | 2 | "Assertive Training" | Joel Zwick | Robert Blair | October 21, 1988 | 177502 | 19.8 |
Larry takes assertiveness training, and promptly goes overboard in using his lessons to speak his mind.
| 53 | 3 | "Aliens" | Joel Zwick | Paula A. Roth | October 28, 1988 | 177512 | 18.7 |
Larry and Balki throw a Halloween party, and after 6 hours of watching horror movies, Larry awakens to discover that Balki is an alien from "Planet Mypos" who is turning everyone into Mypiots by putting vests on them. The episode shares many details with The Dick Van Dyke Show episode "It May Look Like a Walnut!"
| 54 | 4 | "Piano Movers" | Joel Zwick | Robert Blair | November 4, 1988 | 177506 | 20.3 |
Balki volunteers himself and Larry to move Lydia's piano up 10 flights so she can sing for her record-producer date (Michael DeLano), but Larry's back protests.
| 55 | 5 | "High Society" | Joel Zwick | Paula A. Roth | November 11, 1988 | 177505 | 19.5 |
Larry tries to get into a party the Chronicle owners are hosting so he can present an idea to them. Balki getting mistaken for the Crown Prince of Mypos may be his ticket inside.
| 56 | 6 | "Up a Lazy River, Part 1" | Joel Zwick | James O'Keefe & Alan Plotkin | November 18, 1988 | 177510 | 22.3 |
Larry wants to take Jennifer on the Chronicle's camping trip, but she's hesitant when she remembers the ski trip.
| 57 | 7 | "Up a Lazy River, Part 2" | Joel Zwick | Howard Adler & Robert Griffard | November 25, 1988 | 177511 | 21.7 |
After the gang gets lost in the woods, Larry embraces the chance to impress Jennifer by leading them safely back to camp.
| 58 | 8 | "College Bound" | Joel Zwick | William Bickley & Michael Warren and Paula A. Roth | December 9, 1988 | 177516 | 21.0 |
Larry prepares a surprise party for Balki who is taking his college entrance exams; awaiting Balki's return, Larry reminisces about things they've been through together and ponders on which one of them has really been of more help to the other.
| 59 | 9 | "The Gift of the Mypiot" | Joel Zwick | John B. Collins | December 16, 1988 | 177508 | 19.0 |
Mr. Gorpley's a wet blanket at Balki and Larry's Christmas party, but Balki insists on cheering him up.
| 60 | 10 | "Maid to Order" | Joel Zwick | Tom Devanney | January 6, 1989 | 177517 | 26.0 |
Larry's working late, Balki's in college, and household chores are being neglected, so the guys hire a maid (Doris Roberts) who is soon acting too much like a mother for Larry's tolerance.
| 61 | 11 | "That Old Gang of Mine" | Joel Zwick | Robert Blair | January 13, 1989 | 177514 | 25.2 |
When Mary Anne's promotion to London leaves Balki heartbroken, Larry suggests that he get a hobby--but is not prepared for what Balki takes up.
| 62 | 12 | "Crimebusters" | Joel Zwick | John B. Collins | January 20, 1989 | 177515 | 23.1 |
Larry is promoted to the Chronicle's investigative team and he hopes that Harriette's policeman husband will help him get a major scoop. This episode introduces Reginald VelJohnson as Harriette's husband Carl, setting up the premise for Family Matters.
| 63 | 13 | "Games People Play" | Joel Zwick | Bill Rosenthal & Noah Taft | February 3, 1989 | 177518 | 24.3 |
Larry and Balki appear on the game show "Risk it All". Larry forgets his game plan to avoid the risky stunts and just answer questions when the big prize is a Caribbean cruise.
| 64 | 14 | "Come Fly with Me" | Joel Zwick | Howard Adler & Robert Griffard | February 10, 1989 | 177520 | 21.3 |
A Myposian snack grounds Jennifer and Mary Anne, so Larry and Balki must steward a flight to Hawaii.
| 65 | 15 | "Blind Alley" | Joel Zwick | Tom Devanney | February 17, 1989 | 177521 | 24.0 |
When Mr. Gorpley cheats to win the big bowling tournament, Balki steps up and shines--until his trip to the ophthalmologist.
| 66 | 16 | "The King and I" | Joel Zwick | Robert Blair | February 24, 1989 | 445222 | 26.7 |
Lydia's boyfriend, a hypnotherapist, accidentally hypnotizes Balki into thinking he's Elvis Presley. Things only get worse when he goes in for his tax audit
| 67 | 17 | "Prose and Cons" | Joel Zwick | John B. Collins | March 10, 1989 | 177523 | 18.9 |
Larry and Balki are tossed in jail with some unsavory cellmates after refusing to reveal their source for a financial market scandal.
| 68 | 18 | "Car Wars" | Joel Zwick | William Bickley & Michael Warren | March 17, 1989 | 177524 | 22.0 |
Balki's happy to finally have enough money to buy a used car, but Larry squeezes the fun out of the process with his family's rating system.
| 69 | 19 | "Just a Gigolo" | Joel Zwick | Howard Adler & Robert Griffard | March 31, 1989 | 445226 | 22.4 |
Balki unwittingly sets up the recently-heartbroken Lydia with a gigolo who cons women out of their money.
| 70 | 20 | "Seven Card Studs" | Joel Zwick | Paula A. Roth | April 14, 1989 | 445225 | 19.2 |
After Balki gets cheated out of his money at Mr. Gorpley's poker game, Larry claims to be a poker expert and plays to win back Balki's money.
| 71 | 21 | "Teacher's Pest" | Joel Zwick | Tom Devanney | April 28, 1989 | 177522 | 19.0 |
Recruited to teach journalism, Larry soon alienates the class (including Balki) by imposing ridiculously high standards for their work.
| 72 | 22 | "Wedding Belle Blues" | Joel Zwick | Robert Blair | May 5, 1989 | 445228 | 19.4 |
On Balki's 25th birthday, he must go through with the marriage his mama pre-arranged, although he's in love with Mary Anne. Larry and Jennifer try to save him. This was Jo Marie Payton's final appearance on the show as she left to star in the spinoff series Family Matters

=== Season 5 (1989–90) ===
| No. overall | No. in season | Title | Directed by | Written by | Original release date | Prod. code | Viewers (millions) |
|---|---|---|---|---|---|---|---|
| 73 | 1 | "Good Skates" | Joel Zwick | John B. Collins | September 22, 1989 | 445753 | 23.5 |
Larry agrees to participate in a charity skate-a-thon to impress Jennifer, but little does she know he can't skate. Note: This episode coincided with the series premiere of its spin-off, Family Matters.
| 74 | 2 | "Lie-Ability" | Joel Zwick | Howard Adler & Robert Griffard | September 29, 1989 | 445751 | 21.2 |
Larry needs money to help his sister Elaine attend Juilliard, and thinks he has found the perfect way to do it when he is in a car accident.
| 75 | 3 | "The Newsletter" | Joel Zwick | Tom Devanney | October 6, 1989 | 445754 | 21.4 |
Balki's in charge of the company newsletter, but things go awry when Larry encourages him to dig deeper for the "real stories".
| 76 | 4 | "Tooth or Consequences" | Joel Zwick | Paula A. Roth | October 13, 1989 | 445755 | 20.3 |
Balki has a cavity, so Larry takes him to the dentist, where they find out that a trip to the dentist can be fun when there is laughing gas involved.
| 77 | 5 | "Dog Day Mid-Afternoon" | Joel Zwick | Howard Adler & Robert Griffard | October 20, 1989 | 445758 | 22.4 |
Larry does all the work on an exposé of a money-laundering scheme, but gets none of the credit. A disgruntled accountant (George Wyner) arrives at the Chronicle with a bomb, upset that he has not gotten credit for his work on the scheme.
| 78 | 6 | "Poetry in Motion" | Joel Zwick | John B. Collins | November 3, 1989 | 445759 | 20.7 |
Larry tears up the apartment in an attempt to find a rare poem that he believes to be valuable.
| 79 | 7 | "Father Knows Best???, Part 1" | Joel Zwick | John B. Collins | November 10, 1989 | 445756 | 20.5 |
Larry's father comes to visit, and Larry worries that nothing he does is ever good enough for his father (James Noble). But that gets put aside when they are trapped in a rapidly flooding basement.
| 80 | 8 | "Father Knows Best???, Part 2" | Joel Zwick | Tom Devanney | November 17, 1989 | 445757 | 18.8 |
Larry must get the group out of the water-filled basement, and make amends with his father (James Noble) before it is too late.
| 81 | 9 | "Hello Ball" | Joel Zwick | Cheryl Alu & Barry O'Brien | November 24, 1989 | 445760 | 20.5 |
Larry tries not to win at golf, in order to win over Jennifer's father (Robert King), but Balki is better at the game than Larry had thought.
| 82 | 10 | "Almost Live from Chicago" | Joel Zwick | Cheryl Alu & Barry O'Brien | December 1, 1989 | 445752 | 20.6 |
At Larry's urging, Lydia attempts to overcome her fear of cameras to star in her own TV talk show.
| 83 | 11 | "Home Movies" | Joel Zwick | Tom Amundsen | December 8, 1989 | 445761 | 21.8 |
Balki wants to put together a movie of his life in America to show his Mama, but when Larry takes over the project, it bears no resemblance to Balki's real life.
| 84 | 12 | "Everyone in the Pool" | Joel Zwick | Tom Devanney | December 15, 1989 | 445762 | 20.2 |
When it comes time for the football pool at the Chronicle, Larry finds that Balki has a remarkable ability to pick the winners, and tries to capitalize on it.
| 85 | 13 | "Because They're Cousins" | Joel Zwick | Howard Adler & Robert Griffard | January 5, 1990 | 445763 | 23.9 |
Balki gets a visit from his Myposian cousin Bartok (Bronson Pinchot in a dual role), only to discover he's become a California dude with a ripoff scam.
| 86 | 14 | "Disorderly Orderlies" | Joel Zwick | John B. Collins | January 12, 1990 | 445764 | 22.4 |
Larry feigns interest in volunteering at a hospital with Balki, in order to get an interview with an injured football player.
| 87 | 15 | "The Selling of Mypos" | Joel Zwick | Terry Hart | January 26, 1990 | 445765 | 22.9 |
Balki and Larry try to negotiate the sale of Myposian land to a corporation, until Balki questions their motives.
| 88 | 16 | "Nightmare Vacation" | Joel Zwick | Cheryl Alu & Barry O'Brien | February 2, 1990 | 445767 | 23.5 |
Against the group's better judgement, Balki, Jennifer and Mary Anne agree to let Larry plan another vacation, hoping this one won't be a disaster like their previous ones.
| 89 | 17 | "Three's a Crowd" | Joel Zwick | Tom Devanney | February 9, 1990 | 445768 | 20.8 |
Mary Anne moves in with the guys after an argument with Jennifer threatens their friendship.
| 90 | 18 | "A Blast from the Past" | Joel Zwick | John B. Collins | February 16, 1990 | 445770 | 23.1 |
Marvin Berman (George Wyner), who previously had tried to blow up the Chronicle with Larry and Balki (in the earlier episode "Dog Day Mid-Afternoon") wants to take the guys out to dinner to thank them for saving him, but Larry is afraid for his life.
| 91 | 19 | "He's the Boss" | Joel Zwick | Howard Adler & Robert Griffard | February 23, 1990 | 445769 | 20.5 |
A new manager at the Chronicle (Sanford Jensen) gives Balki what seems like a good promotion, until Larry discovers it is a token job with no real responsibilities.
| 92 | 20 | "Here Comes the Judge" | Joel Zwick | Story by : Paul Chitlik & Jeremy Bertrand Finch; Teleplay by : Tom Devanney | March 9, 1990 | 445766 | 19.6 |
Balki joins the Chronicle's grievance committee; however, when Larry finds himself charged with a grievance, he tries to turn the hearing against Balki.
| 93 | 21 | "This Old House" | Joel Zwick | Terry Hart | March 30, 1990 | 445771 | 20.9 |
Larry and Balki try to make money buying and renovating an old house (in which the exterior shots are the same ones used as Mork and Mindy's house from Mork & Mindy). However problems arise when Larry's greed causes them to attempt more extensive remodeling than they can handle.
| 94 | 22 | "Bye, Bye Birdie" | Joel Zwick | Tom Devanney | April 13, 1990 | 445772 | 21.2 |
Balki's pet bird Georgi flies away after Larry leaves the window open, leaving a heartbroken Balki awaiting the bird's return.
| 95 | 23 | "Digging Up the News" | Joel Zwick | Cheryl Alu & Barry O'Brien | April 27, 1990 | 445773 | 19.3 |
Balki and Larry visit the set of a children's TV show to interview the host, "Uncle Shaggy" (Rick Hurst); but when Larry takes a picture of him against his wishes, it could cost Uncle Shaggy his job.
| 96 | 24 | "Eyewitless Report" | Joel Zwick | John B. Collins | May 4, 1990 | 445774 | 19.8 |
On a company trip to the Big Piney National Forest, Larry, Balki, and Gorpley all offer different accounts of an encounter with an escaped killer (Rick Zumwalt).

=== Season 6 (1990–91) ===
| No. overall | No. in season | Title | Directed by | Written by | Original release date | Prod. code | Viewers (millions) |
|---|---|---|---|---|---|---|---|
| 97 | 1 | "Safe at Home" | Richard Correll | Cheryl Alu & Barry O'Brien | September 28, 1990 | 446301 | 19.7 |
After a break-in at the apartment, Larry installs a state-of-the-art burglar alarm, but doesn't feel the need to read the instructions.
| 98 | 2 | "New Kid on the Block" | Greg Antonacci | Bill Daley | October 5, 1990 | 446303 | 18.5 |
Balki babysits for a mischievous child (Alisan Porter), while Larry needs silence to work on an article.
| 99 | 3 | "The Break Up" | James O'Keefe | Terry Hart | October 12, 1990 | 446304 | 19.5 |
Larry's feigned nonchalance at Jennifer's mention of going out with a male friend (David Sederholm) threatens their relationship.
| 100 | 4 | "A Horse is a Horse" | Greg Antonacci | Tom Devanney | October 19, 1990 | 446302 | 20.6 |
Larry convinces Balki to go in with him to buy a racehorse at a discount in an attempt to win big at the track, but they soon find out the horse may be on its last legs. Guest cast: William Denis as Dr. Tierney
| 101 | 5 | "Family Feud" | Judy Pioli | John B. Collins | October 26, 1990 | 446306 | 20.2 |
Zoltan Botulitis (Nicholas Kadi) travels from Mypos to engage Balki in a duel; when Larry tries to discourage the duel, he manages to insult Zoltan, who insists on fighting Larry.
| 102 | 6 | "Call Me Indestructible" | Greg Antonacci | Tom Devanney | November 2, 1990 | 446305 | 20.8 |
After Larry and Balki survive a close call in a small plane, Balki believes they are protected by Teflonos, the Myposian god of protection, and encourages Larry to take some wild risks.
| 103 | 7 | "The Men Who Knew Too Much, Part 1" | Richard Correll | Terry Hart | November 9, 1990 | 446308 | 21.8 |
The cousins are excited to travel to Los Angeles for Larry's first out-of-town assignment, but run into trouble when they inadvertently videotape a mob murder.
| 104 | 8 | "The Men Who Knew Too Much, Part 2" | Richard Correll | Terry Hart | November 16, 1990 | 446309 | 21.4 |
Larry and Balki are on the run from mobsters, while trying to hold on to the videotape that proves their own innocence in the murder.
| 105 | 9 | "The Ring" | Richard Correll | Harriet B. Helberg & Sandy Helberg | November 23, 1990 | 446310 | 20.7 |
Larry finds a "deal" on an engagement ring for Jennifer; but when he finds out the ring is a fake, he needs to switch it for a real diamond without Jennifer finding out.
| 106 | 10 | "Black Widow" | Judy Pioli | Tom Amundsen | November 30, 1990 | 446307 | 22.7 |
Larry is convinced that Mary Anne is actually a convicted killer, and that Balki's life is in danger when he goes on a hiking trip with her.
| 107 | 11 | "The Sunshine Boys" | Judy Pioli | John B. Collins | December 7, 1990 | 446311 | 20.8 |
In an attempt to impress a snobbish acquaintance, Larry gets the idea to acquire a tan to convince him he's been to the Caribbean; however, he and Balki end up spending too much time in the tanning beds.
| 108 | 12 | "Hocus Pocus" | Judy Pioli | Tom Devanney | December 28, 1990 | 446312 | 22.3 |
Balki can't convince Larry to attend a children's benefit show, until Larry discovers Margaret Thatcher is attending, giving him the perfect opportunity for a big interview. When the magician cancels, Larry convinces Balki to perform in his place.
| 109 | 13 | "Finders Keepers" | Judy Pioli | Tom Amundsen | January 4, 1991 | 446314 | 22.6 |
When Balki finds a box containing $50,000, he wants to try to find the rightful owner, but Larry has other ideas.
| 110 | 14 | "Grandpa" | Joel Zwick | Cheryl Alu & Barry O'Brien | January 11, 1991 | 446313 | 25.1 |
Larry's grandfather (John Anderson) comes to town for a visit acting younger than his years, but Larry tries to make sure Grandpa acts his age.
| 111 | 15 | "Little Apartment of Horrors" | Judy Pioli | Terry Hart | January 18, 1991 | 446315 | 21.2 |
Balki's Mama sends Larry a plant that will cure his cold, but when Larry gets the idea to overgrow the plant as part of a money-making scheme, things go awry.
| 112 | 16 | "I Saw This on TV" | Joel Zwick | Paula A. Roth | February 1, 1991 | 446316 | 23.8 |
When Larry plans to lie to Jennifer so he can go to a basketball game instead of the ballet, Balki tells him a story of what happened when Ralph lied to Alice on 'The Honeymooners'. The story is filmed in black and white and acted out by the cast with Larry and Balki portraying Ralph Kramden and Ed Norton, and Jennifer and Mary Anne as Alice and Trixie.
| 113 | 17 | "Speak, Memory" | Judy Pioli | John B. Collins | February 8, 1991 | 446317 | 24.7 |
Larry loses his memory after a fall down the stairs, just before he is to meet Jennifer's mother (Marla Adams), and Balki tries to help him cover it up.
| 114 | 18 | "Out of Sync" | Judy Pioli | Cheryl Alu & Barry O'Brien | February 15, 1991 | 446318 | 25.5 |
Balki has the chance to become a star as "Fresh Young Balki B.", but is shocked when he realizes it is not his voice in the video.
| 115 | 19 | "See How They Run" | Judy Pioli | Thomas R. Nance | February 22, 1991 | 446319 | 19.6 |
Larry helps Balki with his campaign for student body president, but they have different ideas about how to go about it.
| 116 | 20 | "Climb Every Billboard" | Judy Pioli | Tom Devanney | March 15, 1991 | 446320 | 24.8 |
Larry tricks Balki into climbing atop a billboard as part of a promotion for the paper; however the two end up stranded.
| 117 | 21 | "A Catered Affair" | Judy Pioli | Tom Amundsen | March 22, 1991 | 446321 | 25.3 |
Balki is running a catering business, but things go awry when Larry books an event on the same night Balki already has two scheduled---and fails to tell him.
| 118 | 22 | "Duck Soup" | Judy Pioli | Terry Hart | April 5, 1991 | 446322 | 23.2 |
Balki feels left out when he's not asked to join Larry on his duck hunting trip with Mr. Wainwright.
| 119 | 23 | "Great Balls of Fire" | Bill Petty | Cheryl Alu & Barry O'Brien | April 26, 1991 | 446323 | 22.2 |
Larry finds being a volunteer firefighter far too taxing until he learns Jennifer finds firemen attractive.
| 120 | 24 | "See You in September" | Judy Pioli | Paula A. Roth | May 3, 1991 | 446324 | 18.1 |
Balki and Mary Anne are expecting Larry and Jennifer to set a wedding date, but they don't feel ready. To help them, Balki gives them a Myposian marriage test to see if they're right for each other.

=== Season 7 (1991–92) ===
| No. overall | No. in season | Title | Directed by | Written by | Original release date | Prod. code | Viewers (millions) |
|---|---|---|---|---|---|---|---|
| 121 | 1 | "Bachelor Party" | Judy Pioli | Terry Hart | September 20, 1991 | 446851 | 19.3 |
As the best man at Larry's upcoming wedding, Balki is tricked by Mr. Gorpley into throwing a bachelor party. When Mr. Gorpley shows up at the party, he spikes the punch and hires a stripper—then Jennifer finds out.
| 122 | 2 | "The Wedding" | Judy Pioli | Paula A. Roth | September 27, 1991 | 446852 | 19.6 |
While Larry and Balki are driving to Lake Whitefish—where Larry and Jennifer are getting married—they get arrested, putting the ceremony in jeopardy.
| 123 | 3 | "This New House" | Judy Pioli | Tom Amundsen | October 4, 1991 | 446853 | 19.4 |
Larry and Jennifer move into a luxurious Victorian house, but with the rent so high they discover they can't afford to pay for food and heat.
| 124 | 4 | "Weekend at Ferdinand's" | Judy Pioli | Story by : John B. Collins & Thomas R. Nance; Teleplay by : Thomas R. Nance | October 18, 1991 | 446855 | 17.5 |
King Ferdinand of Mypos (Don Amendolia) comes to visit America and dies in Larry's arms, making Larry the new king according to Myposian custom.
| 125 | 5 | "Fright Night" | Judy Pioli | Cheryl Alu & Barry O'Brien | October 25, 1991 | 446856 | 19.6 |
It's up to Larry and Balki to rid the house of a ghost.
| 126 | 6 | "The Gazebo" | Judy Pioli | Terry Hart | November 1, 1991 | 446860 | 17.0 |
Larry and Balki are building a new gazebo in their back yard, and as they struggle to build it, it reminds Jennifer and Mary Anne of Laurel and Hardy as they (and the viewers) see them in a parody of Laurel (Balki) and Hardy (Larry) trying to build a gazebo.
| 127 | 7 | "Citizenship, Part 1" | Judy Pioli | Cheryl Alu & Barry O'Brien | November 8, 1991 | 446857 | 21.9 |
Balki awaits his mother's arrival to witness his swearing in as a United States citizen, but she's irate at his plans to stay in America and summons him home to Mypos. Bronson Pinchot does a dual-role as Balki and his Mama in this and the following episode.
| 128 | 8 | "Citizenship, Part 2" | Judy Pioli | Cheryl Alu & Barry O'Brien | November 15, 1991 | 446858 | 21.6 |
Larry travels to Mypos to try to persuade Balki's mama to let him come back to America, but before he can talk to her, Larry settles happily into the relaxed lifestyle of Mypos and wants to stay.
| 129 | 9 | "Wild Turkey" | Judy Pioli | Tom Devanney | November 22, 1991 | 446859 | 21.3 |
On Thanksgiving, Larry goes into the turkey-selling business. There's 58 turkeys roaming their backyard, and one of the turkeys may have eaten Jennifer's wedding ring.
| 130 | 10 | "Dimitri's World" | Judy Pioli | Tom Amundsen | November 29, 1991 | 446862 | 13.3 |
Put in charge of the Chronicle's weekly children's page, Balki draws a comic about a sheep named Dimitri. When Larry is tasked with coming up with the dialogue, Balki takes issue with what Larry writes.
| 131 | 11 | "Car Tunes" | Judy Pioli | Tom Devanney | December 6, 1991 | 446861 | 22.3 |
When Larry's new car radio is stolen, and the alarm he buys only serves to disturb the neighborhood, he comes up with a daring plan to catch the thief.
| 132 | 12 | "Door to Door" | Judy Pioli | Cheryl Alu & Barry O'Brien | December 20, 1991 | 446854 | 19.1 |
Taking a job selling cleaning supplies door-to-door, Larry looks for a shortcut, trying to get one giant order from a wealthy woman (Marj Dusay).
| 133 | 13 | "Two Angry Men" | Judy Pioli | Thomas R. Nance | January 3, 1992 | 446863 | 21.3 |
Balki stupidly gets himself and Larry called for jury duty the day before Larry and Jennifer's Bermudan vacation, and then holds things up by refusing to vote along with the other jurors.
| 134 | 14 | "Missing" | Judy Pioli | Terry Hart | January 17, 1992 | 446864 | 16.5 |
When Balki's stuffed Dmitri is stolen, he suffers from writer's block, leaving him unable to draw his comic strip. He and Larry decide to catch the thief.
| 135 | 15 | "Going Once, Going Twice" | Judy Pioli | Tom Amundsen | February 1, 1992 | 446865 | 11.3 |
Explaining to Balki the bidding process at an auction makes Larry the accidental owner of a $21,000 bottle of wine, which he hides from Jennifer until he can sell it.
| 136 | 16 | "Yes Sir, That's My Baby" | Judy Pioli | Cheryl Alu & Barry O'Brien | February 8, 1992 | 446866 | 10.0 |
When Larry thinks Jennifer may be pregnant, he and Balki imagine both fatherhood and life as their future babies.
| 137 | 17 | "Wayne Man" | Judy Pioli | Tom Devanney | February 29, 1992 | 446870 | 9.3 |
When Balki wins a trip for four to Las Vegas, he becomes dejected when tickets to his idol, Wayne Newton, are sold out, leaving the gang to try to find a way to make his dream come true. Larry then works up a ridiculous lie saying that Balki is losing his hearing and that the concert is the last thing he wants to hear before he loses it forever.
| 138 | 18 | "The Elevator" | Joel Zwick | George Tricker | March 14, 1992 | 446869 | 9.4 |
Larry and Balki deal with an uncooperative elevator when moving Mr. Wainright's new couch to his office.
| 139 | 19 | "The Play's The Thing" | Judy Pioli | Thomas R. Nance | March 21, 1992 | 446867 | 10.6 |
Balki takes Larry's play, Wheat, to Lydia's theater, but Larry's iron-clad insistence that nothing be changed alienates the cast and crew.
| 140 | 20 | "Stress Test" | Judy Pioli | Tom Devanney | March 28, 1992 | 446868 | 10.2 |
Larry and Balki are chosen by Mr. Wainwright for a mental health test to gauge their level of stress.
| 141 | 21 | "...Or Get Off the Pot" | Judy Pioli | Terry Hart | April 4, 1992 | 446871 | 10.3 |
Despite everyone's best efforts, Balki is oblivious to the fact that Mary Anne wants a commitment from him in the form of a marriage proposal.
| 142 | 22 | "Chicago Suite" | Joel Zwick | Tom Amundsen | April 11, 1992 | 446872 | 8.9 |
Larry tries to get Balki dating again following his break-up with Mary Anne by taking him to a singles bar, and Balki immediately finds a woman he shares interests with, while Larry only finds trouble.
| 143 | 23 | "It Had to Be You" | Judy Pioli | Thomas R. Nance | April 18, 1992 | 446873 | 10.9 |
Jennifer thinks Balki still misses Mary Anne, but Larry's skeptical until they discover Balki and Mary Anne are dating people just like each other. Justin Pinchot, Bronson's younger brother, guest stars as Nico.
| 144 | 24 | "Get Me to the Dump on Time" | Judy Pioli | Tom Devanney | April 18, 1992 | 446874 | 10.9 |
The rush is on with Myposian custom demanding but 24 hours between their engagement and Balki and Mary Anne's marriage, but Larry loses Balki's Myposian marriage necklace. This episode features the final appearances of Belita Moreno as Lydia, Sam Anderson as Mr. Gorpley and F.J. O'Neil as Mr. Wainwright

=== Season 8 (1993) ===
| No. overall | No. in season | Title | Directed by | Written by | Original release date | Prod. code | Viewers (millions) |
|---|---|---|---|---|---|---|---|
| 145 | 1 | "The Baby Shower" | Judy Askins | Thomas R. Nance | July 9, 1993 | 447951 | 13.7 |
Balki and Mary Anne come home from their honeymoon, and they reveal that they are expecting a child. Balki brings with him a native Myposian plant called the "Midolcrampabloatolous root", said to take away the pains of pregnancy that Jennifer is experiencing. Larry eats the root hoping to prove to Jennifer that it is harmless. The result is a baby shower the guests won't forget.
| 146 | 2 | "After Hours" | Judy Askins | Cheryl Alu & Barry O'Brien | July 16, 1993 | 447952 | 13.0 |
Larry tries to keep up with Balki's parade of presents to Mary Anne by trying to find the perfect gift for Jennifer. Instead the cousins find themselves locked in a sporting goods store overnight...with the "security system".
| 147 | 3 | "Lethal Weapon" | Judy Askins | Shari Hearn | July 23, 1993 | 447953 | 12.8 |
After a tragic ant farm accident, Balki believes he is stricken with a deadly curse that brings death to anyone he touches.
| 148 | 4 | "The Baby Quiz" | Judy Askins | Scott Spencer Gorden | July 30, 1993 | 447954 | 14.3 |
The Appletons and Bartokomous' compete for a college scholarship for their unborn children on a local game show.
| 149 | 5 | "Up, Up and Away" | Jeffrey Ganz | Cheryl Alu & Barry O'Brien | August 6, 1993 | 447955 | 14.7 |
| 150 | 6 | "Up, Up and Away" | Judy Askins | Paula A. Roth | August 6, 1993 | 447956 | 17.0 |
A very overdue Jennifer will stop at nothing to finally have her baby...even if it means inducing labor by taking a hot air balloon ride. Trapped on board a runaway hot air balloon, Larry and Balki must find a way to get back to Earth as Jennifer goes into labor.
