= Perfect Strangers (TV series) =

American television sitcom (1986–1993)

- Created by: Dale McRaven
- Directed by: Joel Zwick (seasons 1–7); Various (seasons 1 & 7–8)
- Starring: Bronson Pinchot; Mark Linn-Baker; Melanie Wilson; Rebeca Arthur; Belita Moreno; Sam Anderson; Lise Cutter; Ernie Sabella
- Theme music composer: Jesse Frederick; Bennett Salvay
- Opening theme: "Nothing's Gonna Stop Me Now", performed by David Pomeranz
- Ending theme: "Nothing's Gonna Stop Me Now" (instrumental), composed by Jesse Frederick & Bennett Salvay (seasons 1–7)
- Composers: Jesse Frederick & Bennett Salvay (seasons 1–2; alternating, seasons 3–7); Steven Chesne (alternating, seasons 3–8); Gary Boren (alternating, seasons 7–8)
- Country of origin: United States
- Original language: English
- No. of seasons: 8
- No. of episodes: 150 (list of episodes)

Production
- Executive producers: David Salzman; Thomas L. Miller; Robert L. Boyett; Dale McRaven (season 1); William Bickley; Michael Warren (seasons 6–8); Paula A. Roth (seasons 7–8)
- Camera setup: Film; Multi-camera
- Running time: approx. 24½ minutes
- Production companies: Miller-Boyett Productions; Lorimar-Telepictures (1986–88); Lorimar Television (1988–1993)

Original release
- Network: ABC
- Release: March 25, 1986 – August 6, 1993

Related
- Family Matters (1989–1998)

Perfect Strangers is an American sitcom that ran for eight seasons, from March 25, 1986, to August 6, 1993, on the ABC television network. Created by Dale McRaven, the series chronicles the rocky coexistence of midwestern American Larry Appleton (Mark Linn-Baker) and his distant cousin from eastern Mediterranean Europe, Balki Bartokomous (Bronson Pinchot).

Originally airing on Tuesdays for the short six-episode first season in the spring of 1986, it moved to Wednesdays in prime time in the fall of 1986. It remained on Wednesdays until March 1988, when it was moved to Fridays. The show found its niche there as the anchor for ABC's original TGIF Friday-night lineup, though it aired on Saturdays for a short time in 1992.

== Premise ==
The series chronicles the relationship of Larry Appleton (Mark Linn-Baker) and his distant cousin Balki Bartokomous (Bronson Pinchot). Larry, a Wisconsin native from a large family, has just moved into his first apartment in Chicago and is savoring his first taste of privacy when Balki, a distant cousin from a Mediterranean island, "Mypos", arrives intending to move in with him.

Balki, who was a shepherd on Mypos, interprets what little he knows about the United States by relying on his own (often out-of-context) recollections of American pop culture ("America: Land of my dreams and home of the Whopper"). Balki's signature is his "Dance of Joy", a cross between the do-si-do and the hokey pokey that he performs (with Larry) to celebrate good fortune.

After initially gently rebuffing his cousin's request to stay at his apartment, aspiring photographer Larry decides to take Balki under his wing and teach him about American life; as time goes on, the disparities between the two create many misadventures and growth opportunities. Initially working at a discount store and living in a small apartment, they eventually develop rising careers working for a respectable newspaper, move into larger residences, date two best friend flight attendants, and expand their lifestyle through their various experiences; all while learning to balance Balki's wide-eyed enthusiasm and Myposian ways with Larry's real-world ambitions and American pragmatism. Neurotic Larry is frequently as inept as Balki, if not more so, and often gets the pair into situations that only Balki can set right. Major influences on the show include "buddy sitcoms" such as Laverne & Shirley and Mork & Mindy, both of which were produced by the Perfect Strangers team.

== Synopsis ==
=== Development ===
The series was the brainchild of Dale McRaven (co-creator of Mork & Mindy) and producers Tom Miller and Robert Boyett. Miller claimed that the series' inspiration came in the wake of the 1984 Summer Olympics in Los Angeles, when America experienced a wave of renewed patriotic sentiment. Their idea for a comedy about an immigrant in America was initially rejected by all three major commercial television networks operating in the U.S. at the time (ABC, CBS, and NBC).

In December 1984, Bronson Pinchot garnered notice for his role in Beverly Hills Cop as Serge, an effeminate art gallery employee with an unplaceable foreign accent. When Miller and company pitched Pinchot as the star of their immigrant show, ABC signed on to the project, originally titled The Greenhorn. By this time, Pinchot was unavailable, as he had taken the role of a gay attorney in the NBC series Sara alongside star Geena Davis.

Sara failed to find an audience and was canceled by May 1985. With Pinchot now available, Miller and Boyett developed the show in earnest. By November it was retitled Perfect Strangers and comedian Louie Anderson was cast as the immigrant's American cousin. A pilot episode was put into production, but in the end Anderson was not considered right for the role.

Development was placed into overdrive when ABC President Brandon Stoddard offered the producers a prime tryout slot for the spring of 1986 between the hit shows Who's the Boss? and Moonlighting on Tuesday nights. After running through several actors for the part of Balki's cousin, the producers chose Mark Linn-Baker, whom they had recently seen in a guest appearance on Moonlighting. Linn-Baker displayed immediate chemistry with Pinchot and the series raced into production. It premiered on ABC on March 25, 1986.

=== Season 1 (1986) ===
The series commences with Larry living alone in an apartment in Chicago. In the pilot episode, Balki unexpectedly appears at Larry's door claiming to be his distant cousin. Balki soon joins Larry as a clerk at the Ritz Discount Store, located on the ground level of their apartment building. Their boss is Donald "Twinkie" Twinkacetti (Ernie Sabella), an unscrupulous miser who is also their landlord. Twinkacetti's incessant berating of his two employees (he calls Balki "Turnip" and Larry "Yo-Yo") is occasionally alleviated by his wife Edwina (Belita Moreno). In the first season, upstairs neighbor Susan Campbell (Lise Cutter) is Larry's platonic friend.

Airing in the coveted timeslot between Who's the Boss? and Moonlighting, Perfect Strangers was an instant ratings hit in the spring of 1986, with five of the six episodes landing in the weekly Nielsen top 10 highest-rated programs.

=== Season 2 (1986–87) ===
For its second season, Perfect Strangers was moved to Wednesday nights at 8:00 p.m. as a lead-in to the new ABC sitcom Head of the Class.

Susan's character was phased out early in this season. Larry began dating Jennifer Lyons (Melanie Wilson) and Balki began dating Mary Anne Spencer (Rebeca Arthur), after meeting them through a local gym. In later episodes, it is revealed that both women are flight attendants who live in Larry and Balki's building.

=== Seasons 3–4 (1987–1989) ===
The start of season 3 in late 1987 found Larry and Balki in a new, larger apartment where Balki had his own room instead of sleeping on a fold-out sofa. External shots depict a new apartment building. The characters never referred to the move, and Jennifer and Mary Anne were still co-tenants in the new surroundings.

Larry acquires a reporter job working out of the basement of the Chicago Chronicle, a fictional metropolitan newspaper, and helps Balki get a job in the Chronicle mail room. They are overseen by demanding city editor Harry Burns (Eugene Roche). Burns is phased out of the show by the end of season 3; the paper's publisher, Mr. Wainwright (F.J. O'Neill) is introduced later in season 3, and takes over as Larry's boss after Eugene Roche leaves the show. Mr. Wainwright appears through season 7. Balki's immediate supervisor is mail room head Sam Gorpley (Sam Anderson, who had portrayed a bank clerk in the season one episode "Check This" in which Balki opens his first bank account). Gorpley is a rude and greedy boss to Balki and does everything he can to fire him. Gorpley never warms to Balki (he sometimes calls him "the Mypiot") insults him regularly and wants to fire him. Lydia Markham is the Chronicle's thin-skinned, multi-phobic, and very successful advice columnist; she is played by Belita Moreno, who had previously played Edwina Twinkacetti in the first two seasons. Although Larry physically remains at his typewriter in the basement, he joins the investigative team of Marshall and Walpole (loosely based on the famed Washington Post duo of Woodward and Bernstein) in season 4. Larry's relationship with Jennifer matures as well.

Harriette Winslow (Jo Marie Payton-France) works as an elevator operator. Her husband Carl (Reginald VelJohnson) is introduced in the fourth-season episode "Crimebusters", in which the couple moves into Larry and Balki's apartment building.

In March 1988, midway through the third season, ABC moved Perfect Strangers from its successful Wednesday-night slot to Friday nights at 8:00 p.m. before Full House. This was a key development in the formation of the ABC Friday-night comedy block that later became known as "TGIF". Later moving to the 9/8c slot on Friday nights in the fall of 1989, Perfect Strangers remained an anchor of ABC's Friday-night programming until it was unsuccessfully moved to Saturday nights in February 1992.

=== Seasons 5–6 (1989–1991) ===
In the fall of 1989, after two seasons on Perfect Strangers, Harriette's character was given her own spin-off series, Family Matters. Joining Perfect Strangers in the TGIF lineup, Family Matters eventually ran longer than its parent show. Harriette was not seen again on Perfect Strangers, although an early Family Matters episode explained that she had been fired as the elevator operator, only to be re-hired as chief of security at the Chronicle. Carl became a main character on Family Matters.

Shortly after the sixth season opened, the producers attempted to add a child character to the show. Tess Holland, as played by Alisan Porter (who had starred on ABC's short-lived Chicken Soup the previous fall), was introduced as the troublemaking-but-immensely-cute little girl who lived upstairs from Larry and Balki. Tess appeared in the season's second episode, "New Kid on the Block", when Balki agrees to babysit her, causing an uproar both at home and at the Chronicle. While Porter was supposed to be on full-time, and even credited in the opening title sequence of the episode, she was suddenly dropped, never to be seen again. The experiment of adding a child to the cast was partially influenced by the network as well since ABC's TGIF lineup wished to incorporate the child-and-preteen demographic into its audience. While the content of Perfect Strangers could often appeal to the family as a whole, it had never had children in the regular cast. A similar infusion happened a few months later on sister show Going Places, which had also started with a more adult tone.

While Larry and Jennifer's romance blossomed, Balki and Mary Anne's relationship moved more slowly: the pair would get very close, but then back off after fleeting moments of passion, then drift back into affection. Many viewers' predictions came true near the beginning of season 6, when Larry proposed to Jennifer, after feeling competition from her old flame who was trying to woo her back. Jennifer accepted, and in the season finale, they set a wedding date. As the 6th season (1990–91) closed, it was clear that despite Larry's impending marriage, his and Balki's relationship would somehow remain a focal point of the show.

=== Season 7 (1991–92) ===
In season seven's beginning (which premiered in September 1991), Larry and Jennifer's marriage meant that Perfect Strangers would move in a different direction. Larry and Jennifer move into a large Victorian house, then discover that they cannot afford the rent without additional roommates: Balki and Mary Anne. At midseason, Balki and Larry receive a promotion at the Chronicle, drawing weekly editors of the comic strip based on his stuffed sheep, Dimitri. Gorpley and Lydia make occasional appearances throughout the season, but are gradually phased out as they have little relevance to Larry and Balki's new career paths when they moved up from the basement to the top floor.

With Larry and Jennifer happily married, the series turns toward Balki and Mary Anne's relationship. In the season's last several episodes, Mary Anne stops seeing Balki and moves out of the house. In the April 1992 season finale, Balki and Mary Anne resolve their differences and suddenly marry; the episode and season conclude with the couple on their way to an extended honeymoon in Mypos—and with Jennifer telling Larry that they are expecting.

=== Season 8 (1993) ===
The first episode of season eight picked up several months after the end of season seven, by which time Jennifer is visibly pregnant. Balki and Mary Anne returned from Mypos, revealing that Mary Anne was also well into a pregnancy. For the eighth season, the Chronicle storylines were phased out, with the series shifting its full attention to the home life of the characters. The series ended with a two-part episode "Up Up and Away", with each heralding the birth of a baby (first Robespierre, son of Balki and Mary Anne, and then Tucker, son of Larry and Jennifer). The last scene segues in and out of a musical montage of memorable scenes from the series to the tune of "Unforgettable" by Nat King Cole. The closing credits showed the cast bowing before the studio audience with Mark Linn-Baker saying, "Thank you all for being with us. Good night." Though it was not shown in the episode, co-stars Pinchot and Linn-Baker then did the "Dance of Joy" for the studio audience one last time.

== Cast ==
The cast of Perfect Strangers in season 4. Front row (left to right): Melanie Wilson, Mark Linn-Baker, Belita Moreno, Bronson Pinchot, and Rebeca Arthur. Back row (left to right): Jo Marie Payton-France and Sam Anderson.

Main cast

- Bronson Pinchot – Balki Bartokomous
- Mark Linn-Baker – Larry Appleton
- Melanie Wilson – Jennifer Lyons (later Appleton) (seasons 2–8)
- Rebeca Arthur – Mary Anne Spencer (later Bartokomous) (seasons 2–8)
- Belita Moreno – Edwina Twinkacetti (seasons 1–2); Lydia Markham (seasons 3–7)
- Ernie Sabella – Donald Twinkacetti (seasons 1–2)
- Lise Cutter – Susan Campbell (seasons 1–2)
- Jo Marie Payton-France – Harriette Winslow (seasons 3–4)
- Sam Anderson – Sam Gorpley (seasons 3–7)

Recurring cast

- F.J. O'Neil – Mr. Wainwright (seasons 3–7)
- Eugene Roche – Harry Burns (season 3)
- Jim Doughan – Jimmy, the Security Guard

== Production ==
Perfect Strangers was produced by Miller-Boyett Productions in association with Lorimar-Telepictures, which later became Lorimar Television in 1988. The show, for its entire run, was executive produced by Thomas L. Miller and Robert L. Boyett, and series creator Dale McRaven was executive producer with them for the first two seasons, becoming an executive consultant thereafter. William Bickley and Michael Warren, who became longtime associates of Miller and Boyett, were supervising producers during seasons one through four, elevating to co-executive producers in season five and finally executive producers with Miller and Boyett from seasons six through eight. Chip and Doug Keyes, who also served as producers on Miller and Boyett's first project under Lorimar, Valerie (later The Hogan Family), were producers on Perfect Strangers during its first season. Others who joined or remained on the production staff for several seasons included Paula A. Roth (who eventually became a principal showrunner in the seventh season alongside the senior executive producers), Alan Plotkin, Terry Hart, James O'Keefe, and the team of Barry O'Brien & Cheryl Alu.

Robert Griffard and Howard Adler, who joined the show in its third season as writers and executive story consultants, were promoted to co-producers in season five. At the end of the 1989–90 season, Griffard and Adler launched pre-production on their own series developed by Miller/Boyett, Going Places, which followed Perfect Strangers on TGIF the following season. Later seasons saw the arrival of such producers as Shari Hearn and Tom Devanney.

In 1991, Bickley and Warren launched their own production plate, Bickley-Warren Productions, as associates to Miller/Boyett. The Bickley-Warren Productions entity oversaw Family Matters, Step by Step and Getting By for Miller/Boyett, and alone were later the producers of Hangin' with Mr. Cooper and Kirk, both of which were produced by Warner Bros. Television (which absorbed Lorimar Television in 1993). Despite the existence of the Bickley-Warren plate during the final two seasons of Perfect Strangers, and the fact that Bickley and Warren were still active as producers on Strangers, the Bickley-Warren logo was never added to the show's closing credits as an associate production company.

Within a year after Perfect Strangers finished production, many of its existing production staff (namely O'Brien & Alu, Plotkin, co-producer Michael J. Morris, and executive story consultant Scott Spencer Gorden) were all assigned to sister series Getting By at the start of its second season (1993–94).

=== Theme song and opening sequence ===
==== Theme song ====
The show's theme song, "Nothing's Gonna Stop Me Now", was written by Jesse Frederick and Bennett Salvay, who composed the themes for other Miller-Boyett series, including later shows Full House, Step by Step, and Perfect Strangers spin-off Family Matters. Frederick and Salvay also composed the show's musical score for the entire first two seasons; for the remaining seasons, the score compositions rotated between Frederick and Salvay, Steven Chesne, and/or Gary Boren. The theme was performed by David Pomeranz. The music was rearranged and the lyrics re-recorded for season three and the music was rearranged slightly in season five.

==== Opening credits ====
===== First version (seasons 1–2) =====
During seasons one and two, the opening sequence begins with images of Balki and Larry wiping sideways from opposite sides of the screen to meet in the middle, with the series title superimposed on top. Larry is shown saying goodbye to his family as he leaves his home in Wisconsin, and drives to Chicago in his old red Ford Mustang. The sequence then shifts to Balki, who is shown making his own farewells on Mypos before being driven off on the back of a horse cart, sitting alongside a box mislabeled "America or Burst". Balki is next seen on the tramp steamer as he sights the Statue of Liberty, then on a bus, presumably making his way to Chicago. After a brief shot of Larry driving under a "Welcome to Chicago" sign (in reality, located on eastbound Interstate 190 leading out of O'Hare International Airport), the sequence ends with the same shot of Balki and Larry together that began the sequence. The first season featured a script font for the series title and credits. For the second season, the show's title appears more similar to later seasons, and the script font is replaced with fonts similar to those used in the remaining seasons. The Lake Shore Drive footage is now shown correctly. Additionally, the Larry and Balki sequences are shortened so that brief clips from some of the early episodes could be shown.

===== Second version (seasons 3–8) =====
For season three, the opening sequence was overhauled. The sequence begins with a close-up of Larry and Balki on the back of a tour boat heading east down the Chicago River, then zooming out to show them traveling under the Irv Kupcinet Bridge (the Wrigley Building and the now-demolished Sun-Times building can be seen in the background). A much larger version of the second season series title is superimposed on this image. During the third season only, light sparkles across this title. The sequence briefly recaps Larry and Balki's journeys to Chicago using footage from the earlier seasons. When Larry passes under the "Welcome to Chicago" sign this time, the sequence cuts to new footage of Larry and Balki around Chicago, including jogging in Lincoln Park, Balki greeting the female driver of a horse-drawn cab, Larry reading a newspaper from the newsstands, braving a wind gust on a city street, attending a Chicago Cubs game at Wrigley Field, and messing around in a revolving door. After a view of an El train moving over the city street, the sequence concludes with Larry and Balki emerging from the subway to attend the Chicago Theatre. The theater marquee shows, appropriately enough, Neil Simon's The Odd Couple. The new location shots were filmed on September 11 and 12, 1987. This sequence remained the same from season three through the end of the series in season eight.

As a brief salute to its parent series, in the opening credits of the spin-off series Family Matters for the first three seasons, the Winslow family is shown riding bicycles over the Irv Kupcinet Bridge, as seen from the same vantage point as in the opening Perfect Strangers sequence.

=== Exterior shot locations ===
==== First apartment building ====
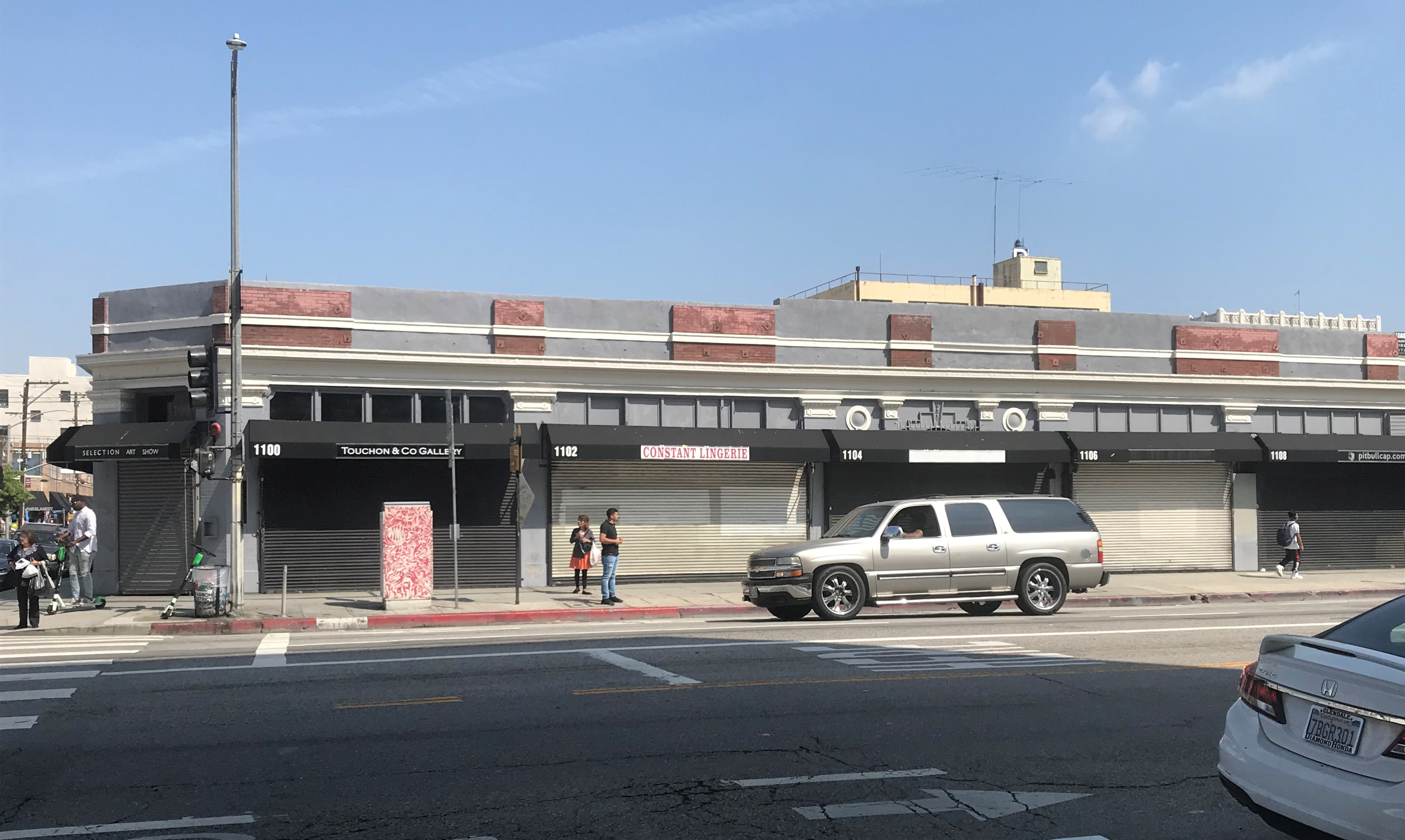
Larry & Balki's first apartment, June 2019.

The building used for the exterior shots of Larry and Balki's apartment for the first two seasons was the now non-existent Santa Rita Hotel, located at the south corner of S. Main St. and E. 11th St. in downtown Los Angeles, California. Since the series, the building has been remodeled and the upper stories removed. What remains of the building now houses several small shops and importers.

==== Second apartment building ====
The apartment building seen in the exterior shots from seasons three through six (and two episodes of season seven) (Note: The apartment building was seen throughout the third through sixth seasons, and in the first and third episodes of the seventh season (the episodes "Bachelor Party" and "This New House"). "This New House" is the last episode with scenes set in the apartment, and the episode where they move to the new Victorian house, which remains the setting through the rest of the series.) is located at the northwest corner of West Dickens Avenue and North Clark Street in Lincoln Park, Chicago, and little has changed in appearance today.

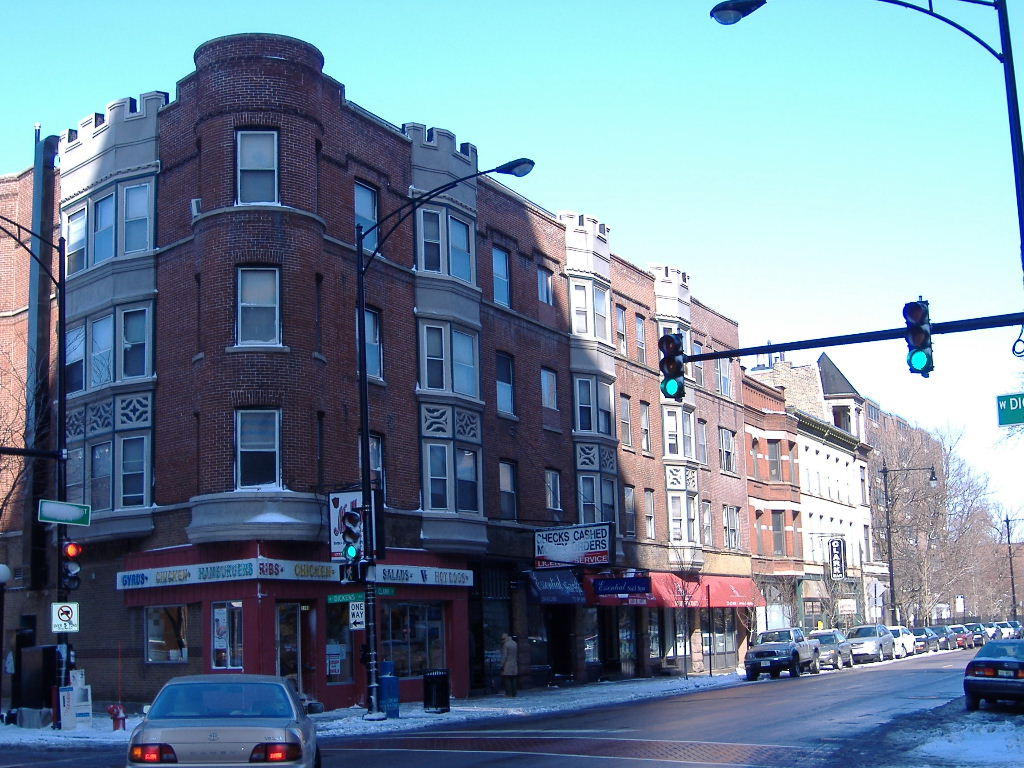
Larry & Balki's second apartment, March 2008

==== Chicago Chronicle ====
The Chicago Chronicle building is in actuality known as the London Guarantee Building, located at 360 North Michigan Avenue in downtown Chicago.

== Episodes ==
There were a total of eight seasons in the series. The first and last seasons were six episodes each. The second through fourth seasons had 22 episodes each, and the fifth through seventh each had 24 episodes. There were a total of 150 episodes in the series.

Perfect Strangers' ratings remained steady throughout its long run, usually ranking among Nielsen's top 40 programs for its first six seasons. It was never a massive hit, but consistently in a comfortable spot in the ratings, and it usually won its time slot on Friday nights.

By the fall of 1991, ABC had been reaping the rewards of the successful TGIF and wanted to capitalize on the preteen-and-younger demographic for Saturday nights as well, to decrease competition from NBC’s popular Saturday evening lineup of adult-oriented sitcoms The Golden Girls, Walter & Emily, Empty Nest and Nurses. In late January 1992, the network rolled out plans to launch a similar family-friendly comedy block for Saturday, also helmed by TGIF creator Jim Janicek. It was announced that Perfect Strangers would move from TGIF to join this new lineup to help it take off. On February 1, 1992, Perfect Strangers began airing in the 9 p.m. slot of I Love Saturday Night, the new TGIF sister lineup (which included Growing Pains, Who's the Boss?, and Capitol Critters). The series experienced a drastic decline in ratings. It dropped to #65 for the remainder of the season. In July 1992, ABC moved Perfect Strangers back to Fridays at 9:30 p.m. ET to fill the timeslot with reruns until the new TGIF season began. The reruns that were aired won their timeslot as they had before.

ABC had initially ordered 13 episodes to be produced for the show's eighth and final season, though the network ultimately shortened it to 6 episodes which were filmed during the summer of 1992, but broadcast from July 9 to August 6, 1993. The season was rated in the top 20 with its series finale attracting 15 million households and rated #11 for the week of August 1, 1993. The average Nielsen rating for the entire run of eight seasons was #27. For the abbreviated eighth season, Perfect Strangers once again aired on Fridays at 9:30/8:30c.

Season	Episodes	Originally released		Nielsen ratings
Season	Episodes	First released	Last released	Nielsen ratings
1	6	March 25, 1986	April 29, 1986	#13
2	22	September 17, 1986	May 6, 1987	#31
3	22	September 23, 1987	May 6, 1988	#48
4	22	October 14, 1988	May 5, 1989	#38
5	24	September 22, 1989	May 4, 1990	#34
6	24	September 28, 1990	May 3, 1991	#32
7	24	September 20, 1991	April 18, 1992	#61
8	6	July 9, 1993	August 6, 1993	#19

== Syndication ==
From August 28, 1989, to July 13, 1990, reruns of the first four seasons of Perfect Strangers aired on ABC's daytime program block. Warner Bros. Domestic Television Distribution (former sister company to series production company Lorimar Television) distributed the series for broadcast television syndication from September 1990 to September 1997. USA Network aired reruns of the show from September 1997 to September 11, 1998. The WB 100+ carried the series from September 17, 2001, to December 2002.

The series aired on Nick at Nite, first with a 6-episode marathon on July 14, 2000, and then a special airing in November 2000; the series aired regularly in late nights from February 3 to September 20, 2003. TV Land aired reruns from August 2, 2002, to September 28, 2002, and January 3 to February 1, 2003, as part of its now-defunct "TV Land Kitschen" weekend late-night block, though special episodes aired on the channel in December 2000, April and December 2001, December 2002, January and December 2003, and June 2005. From October 1 to November 1, 2007, Ion Television aired reruns of Perfect Strangers on its primetime lineup Monday-Thursday nights at 8:30 p.m. (ET/PT). It is not currently broadcast on either broadcast or cable television in the U.S..

Various episodes were seen on AOL's In2TV video-on-demand service starting in March 2006, though after AOL's June 2009 announcement of its split with Time Warner, the series was moved to the AOL Video site.

Outside of the United States, the series aired in the Netherlands by public TV, in Turkey by the Turkish Radio and Television Corporation dubbed in Turkish. In Pakistan, reruns were carried by Pakistan Television Corporation in its original form. In Bangladesh, reruns were carried by BTV in its original form. The series aired in the United Kingdom on the BBC from early 1987 broadcasting the first 4 series, Australia and New Zealand (on Channel 2, now called TVNZ 2) in its original form; reruns aired in Australia on 7TWO between March and October 2011 and in 2013. The series aired in Bulgaria by BTV and in the Bulgarian language; Bulgarians know Balki mostly as a Greek. It aired in the Philippines by RPN 9 in its original form, it aired with Arabic subtitles in Kuwait on KTV2 and in Lebanon on Télé Liban (TL). The series aired in Ireland by RTÉ on Network 2 in its original form.

The series aired in Canada on DejaView channel 636.

On September 29, 2017, Perfect Strangers became available for streaming on Hulu along with fellow Warner Bros. TV properties Family Matters, Full House, Hangin' with Mr. Cooper and Step by Step, in addition to Disney-ABC TV properties Boy Meets World, Dinosaurs and Home Improvement. Perfect Strangers would leave Hulu on October 1, 2021.

== Spin-off ==
Perfect Strangers received a spin-off series: the long-running family sitcom Family Matters, which aired from September 22, 1989, to July 17, 1998. The series was centered around Harriette Winslow (Jo Marie Payton) in the role she originated on Perfect Strangers (Harriette was played by Judyann Elder for the second half of season nine after Payton's departure), and her police officer husband Carl (Reginald VelJohnson; the character was initially introduced on Perfect Strangers in the fourth-season episode "Crimebusters") and their family. The series, which initially garnered modest ratings for most of its first season, became a ratings hit after the Winslows' annoying, accident-prone, budding inventor next-door neighbor Steve Urkel (Jaleel White), was introduced midway through the show's first season.

Neither Family Matters nor Perfect Strangers featured a direct crossover with the other, though Balki and Larry were originally scripted to appear in the pilot episode before the scene was cut from the broadcast. Mark Linn-Baker and Melanie Wilson each guest starred on the show, as a different character, and Linn-Baker directed an episode. Footage of the Chicago Chronicle building shot for Perfect Strangers appeared in the second episode of Family Matters and music originally written for Perfect Strangers was used during the early seasons of Family Matters as well. Several premises from popular episodes of Perfect Strangers ("Just Desserts", "Pipe Dreams" and "Blind Alley") were also recycled as first-season episodes of Family Matters ("Baker's Dozen", "Mr. Badwrench", and "Bowl Me Over", respectively).

== Home media ==
The season four episode "Maid to Order" was released as part of a limited edition bonus disc of the complete first season DVD of Night Court on February 8, 2005, by Warner Home Video.

In February 2008, Warner Home Video released seasons 1 and 2 of Perfect Strangers on DVD in Regions 1, 2 & 4. Further planned season releases ultimately did not materialize. In an article on TVShowsOnDVD.com regarding TV series with stalled DVD releases, it was mentioned that the main hold-up for any subsequent releases of Perfect Strangers is not poor sales but rather high music licensing costs. It is noted that the series sometimes featured popular songs within certain episodes, though the versions by the artists who originally performed them were usually not used; instead they were commonly sung a cappella by Mark Linn-Baker and/or Bronson Pinchot's characters whenever the script called for Balki and/or Larry to sing within the episode.

In July 2017, a representative for Warner Archive Collection indicated on a social media post that the remainder of the series would be released on DVD, with a formal announcement to be made in the near future. The complete third season was released on April 17, 2018, with the next three seasons being released later the same year, and the last two released in 2019.

DVD Name	Ep #	Release dates		
DVD Name	Ep #	Region 1	Region 2 (GER)	Region 4
The Complete First and Second Seasons	28	February 5, 2008	March 14, 2008	September 3, 2008
The Complete Third Season	22	April 17, 2018	N/A	N/A
The Complete Fourth Season	22	June 19, 2018	N/A	N/A
The Complete Fifth Season	24	September 25, 2018	N/A	N/A
The Complete Sixth Season	24	December 4, 2018	N/A	N/A
The Complete Seventh and Eighth Seasons	30	May 28, 2019	N/A	N/A

== In popular culture ==
- Professional wrestling tag team Edge & Christian referenced Balki in a backstage segment of the December 18, 2000 episode of WWF Raw is War, when Edge tells Christian "so that's why Balki is a perfect stranger".
- Perfect Strangers and star Mark Linn-Baker are referenced in the HBO TV series The Leftovers, which takes place after a fictional global event called the "Sudden Departure", the inexplicable, simultaneous disappearance of 140 million people, 2% of the world's population. Within the show, the entire cast of Perfect Strangers has departed — except for Linn-Baker, who, it turns out, has faked his departure. In Season 3 of The Leftovers, a present-day Linn-Baker appears briefly as himself and plays a direct role in the unfolding plotline.
- In the Master of None episode "Indians on TV", Dev (Aziz Ansari) and Ravi (Ravi Patel) are offered the main roles in an Indian-centric remake of Perfect Strangers, with the main characters being Darren the assimilated Indian-American, and Srikumar, his cousin from India.
- Fellow ABC sitcom The Goldbergs paid homage to Perfect Strangers in the season six episode "Our Perfect Strangers", by re-creating the show's iconic opening sequence with a distant cousin, Gleb, who was visiting the family from Russia.
- A 2019 Father's Day episode of the YouTube series Pittsburgh Dad has the titular character telling his offscreen wife Deb what a "perfect day" would be. It then cuts to a scene-for-scene remake of the Perfect Strangers open (set in Pittsburgh instead of Chicago) titled Perfect Yinzers, complete with the Perfect Strangers theme song. The video featured Dad as Balki and longtime WTAE-TV news anchor Sally Wiggin as Larry. (Coincidentally, being the market's ABC affiliate, WTAE-TV aired Perfect Strangers during its original run.) The opening credits features Bill Cowher and Terminator 2 as "guest stars" and even references "Cousin Balki" alongside "Whoever done the Transformers movies" as "supervising producers".
- Season 4, Episode 3 ("Two for the Road") of the Hulu series Only Murders in the Building, which began streaming on September 10, 2024, used the Perfect Strangers theme song as a plot device. It is played over a scene involving Oliver Putnam and Zach Galifianakis, who is portraying Oliver in a Hollywood movie, spending the day getting to know one another. At the same time, Howard Morris hears the theme being played over a ham radio channel that he is monitoring for Charles-Haden Savage, Mabel, and Oliver and notes it in a notebook he is keeping for them. Near the end of the episode, Mabel is sitting with Howard, Charles-Haden, and Oliver in the apartment of a mysterious squatter they are searching for when she starts to sing the theme. Charles-Haden joins in but Oliver doesn't seem to recognize it, much to Mabel's astonishment. Howard does and remembers that he had heard it on the ham radio earlier and shows his entry about it to the group.

== Foreign versions ==
- When the show was aired in Brazil, Balki was renamed "Zeca" (a Brazilian nickname) and his nationality was changed to Brazilian, specifically from the state of Minas Gerais, in a blatant adulteration of the character and the storyline itself. The show was called Primo Cruzado (Cousin Cruzado, where "cruzado" was the name of Brazilian currency from that time).
- In the fall of 2006, the Russian TV station REN TV launched a remake of Perfect Strangers featuring Andrei, from a remote former Soviet republic, who moves in with his cousin Ivan, a Moscow resident.
- The show was aired 1988 until 1994 on TVRI in Indonesia
- From the late 1980s into the mid-1990s, the show was aired by Channel 2 in Saudi Arabia
- In the German dubbing, Balki was said to be an actual Greek and Mypos a Greek island. Even the show was called Ein Grieche erobert Chicago (A Greek conquers Chicago) and in the opening credits, Balki said that he became bored with his sheep in Greece so he went to America to visit his cousin. In the German version, Balki has no foreign accent and speaks the same native-accented German as Larry.
- Other translations of the title were: Barki e Larry – Due Perfetti Americani (Italy), Dos Perfectos Desconocidos (Latin America), Larry et Balki (France), Primos Lejanos (Spain), Vărul Din Strainatate (Romania), Напълно непознати (Bulgaria), Perfektni Pribuzni (Slovakia), Potpuni stranci (Croatia), Muhteşem İkili (Turkey).and "Krovim rechokim meod (very distant relatives)" (Israel).
