= Balki Bartokomous =

- Perfect Strangers character
- Balki in the series' intro credits.
- First appearance: "Knock Knock...Who's There?"
- Last appearance: "Up, Up and Away, Part 2"
- Created by: Dale McRaven
- Portrayed by: Bronson Pinchot

Balki Bartokomous is a fictional character played by Bronson Pinchot in the television sitcom Perfect Strangers. He is from the fictional Mediterranean island of Mypos, supposedly near Greece.

== Character history ==
Pinchot was first approached by producers Tom Miller and Robert Boyett to play the role of an immigrant to the United States in a show tentatively titled The Greenhorn. He initially refused, not wanting to play another character similar to "Serge"—his role in Beverly Hills Cop, who also has an unusual accent. He reconsidered after returning from a trip to Greece and decided to base the character and the fictional island of Mypos on the people he encountered in the Greek villages. Pinchot came up with the name Balki, after his sister's dog named "Balcony", "Balcy" for short.

=== Personality ===
Balki was born and raised on the fictional Greek-like island of Mypos, where he eked out a living as a shepherd and dreamed of a better life in the United States. Balki is a naive, optimistic, and well-meaning person. Pinchot once said of his character "...he looks at the world like a four-year-old [and] sees the world as benevolent". These traits, along with his ignorance of American culture, sometimes get Balki into difficult or dangerous situations, with his cousin Larry Appleton invariably coming to his rescue. However, Larry soon realizes that for all of Balki's naivety and cultural malapropisms, he is otherwise a very intelligent and courageous man of many talents who often saves the day himself.

Mypos, as described by Balki, was a somewhat strange land, with many bizarre customs and traditions. In one episode, Larry is portrayed going duck hunting, and the normally gentle Balki surprisingly asks to come along, out of intense hatred for ducks, which are regarded as vicious predators on Mypos. The description he gives of the ducks on Mypos later in the episode, however, implies that Archaeopteryx still exist on the island. It is also described as being something of a primitive, backward place, with Larry once mentioning that the whole country has just one telephone (with call-waiting) and only the royal family has indoor plumbing.

Balki's keen sheep-tending skills, and his fondness for a stuffed sheep named Dimitri are referenced throughout the series. For example, in the seventh season episode "Dimitri's World", Larry and Balki begin writing a cartoon strip for the (fictional) newspaper the Chicago Chronicle based on his stuffed sheep. Balki reveals that the stuffed sheep is made from the wool of a sheep also named Dimitri, who died saving him from being run over by a carriage. In the episode, "Falling in Love Is...", Dimitri is dressed and posed in a way to reflect what is going on. Balki puts out a bowl of wax lips for his date with Carol, throughout the episode, Dimitri also wears a pair of wax lips. Also in season 7, Dimitri's picture is seen on their mantel.

=== Relationship to other characters ===
When the series begins, Balki arrives in America to live with his distant cousin Larry Appleton, carrying his meager possessions in a trunk labeled "America or Burst". A scene depicting this trunk is shown during the opening credits throughout the run of the show, although it was somewhat shortened from season 3 on. In the first scene of the pilot, he appears on his Cousin Larry's doorstep in Chicago, explaining that he first went to Madison, Wisconsin to find Larry, only to find that Larry had just moved to Chicago. The pilot to Perfect Strangers was originally filmed with comedian Louie Anderson as the Cousin Larry character; however the role was recast with Mark Linn-Baker playing the part, and the original pilot never aired.

Balki is very close to his mother, whom he calls "Mamma", and talks about her regularly throughout the series. She is an unseen character until she appears in the season 7 episode (Citizenship), but Balki speaks of her often in the series. In "Citizenship", Balki's mother (also played by Pinchot) comes to the United States to see Balki become an American citizen (though due to a mistranslation on Larry's part, Balki's mother originally thinks she is coming to see Balki get his driver's license). When Balki's mother learns that he is becoming an American citizen, she is hurt because she has hoped that Balki would return to Mypos. Balki's mother gives Balki a "chicken foot" with a missing toe, which signifies that unless he does what his mother wishes, she will disown him. Balki returns to Mypos, but Larry follows him to convince Balki's mother to let Balki return to the United States. Balki does so and becomes an American citizen. Balki also mentions Uncle Stavros many times in the series.

In a season 2 episode (Hunks Like Us), Balki meets his girlfriend Mary Anne Spencer at a health club. They eventually get married in the season 7 finale. In the first part of the series finale (Up, Up, and Away), Mary Anne gives birth to their son, Robespierre-Boinki Bartokomous.

The character Sam Gorpley (Balki's employer for seasons 3-7) is often abusive toward Balki. Gorpley initially plans to hire his nephew to work in the mail room but the nephew is not available, so the editor Harry Burns gives Balki the job. This makes Gorpley try to find an excuse to fire Balki so that he can give the job to his nephew.

=== Occupation ===
Many scenes of Perfect Strangers take place in Larry and Balki's workplace. In the pilot (Knock Knock... Who's There), Larry gets Balki a job at the Ritz Discount store, where Larry is already employed. They work for manager Donald Twinkacetti for the first two seasons. In season 3, after Larry gets a job at the Chicago Chronicle, Balki begins working in the Chronicle's mailroom. Larry and Balki both work in the same basement room at the Chronicle. Balki works for Sam Gorpley, who regularly insults him. In the season 7 episode (Dimitri's World), Balki and Larry are promoted at the Chicago Chronicle. The two of them work together writing Dimitri's World, a comic strip about Balki's beloved sheep. They move to another floor after their promotions, providing a new setting for workplace scenes. However, the room in the basement is still occasionally used in later episodes.

A few episodes of the series focus on Balki's education. In the first two seasons, Balki mentions attending night school to earn his high school diploma. His graduation is the plot of the season 3 episode "The Graduate", where he is valedictorian. The season 4 episode College Bound is a flashback episode: While waiting to hear if Balki has been accepted into a Chicago City College, the characters discuss whether Larry's guidance for Balki has been good or bad. At the end of the episode, Balki says he has been accepted. In the episode "Teacher's Pest" toward the end of season 4, Balki takes a journalism class taught by Larry. The plot of the season 6 episode "See How They Run" is his unsuccessful campaign for student body president.

=== The Dance of Joy ===
In the show, whenever Balki is particularly pleased by something, he does the "Dance of Joy" with Larry. It is always preceded by Balki exclaiming, "Now, that we are so happy, we do the dance of joy!" The dance consists of leg kicks, jumping and alternating chants of "Hey," and ends with Larry jumping into Balki's arms.
