= Thine Own Self =

- Star Trek: The Next Generation episode
- Episode no.: Season 7 Episode 16
- Directed by: Winrich Kolbe
- Story by: Christopher Hatton
- Teleplay by: Ronald D. Moore
- Production code: 268
- Original air date: February 14, 1994

Guest appearances
- Ronnie Claire Edwards - Talur; Michael Rothhaar - Garvin; Kimberly Cullum - Gia; Michael G. Hagerty - Skoran; Andy Kossin - Barkonian Apprentice; Richard Ortega-Miro - Rainer

Episode chronology
← Previous "Lower Decks"	Next → "Masks"
- Star Trek: The Next Generation season 7

"Thine Own Self" is the 168th episode of the American science fiction television series Star Trek: The Next Generation, and the 16th episode of the seventh season.

Set in the 24th century, the series follows the adventures of the Starfleet crew of the Federation starship Enterprise-D. In this episode, Data, suffering from amnesia, unintentionally exposes a pre-industrial alien village to dangerously radioactive materials; Troi takes tests necessary for a promotion from Lt. Commander to Commander.

== Plot ==
Data is sent to Barkon IV, a planet inhabited by a pre-Industrial society "roughly equivalent to that of the Renaissance on Earth" to recover the radioactive remains of a deep space probe that crashed on the planet. However, Data is injured during the recovery, and without memory of who he is or his mission, walks into a village carrying the case of radioactive parts. Garvin, the village magistrate, and his daughter Gia, take Data to their healer, Talur, who determines he must be an "ice-man"; Gia names Data "Jayden". Garvin discovers the probe's fragments, unaware of their hazard, and attempts to sell them to make a profit. As the village folk begin to wear the fragments as jewelry, they start to succumb to radiation poisoning, though Talur is unfamiliar with the symptoms. Data uses his own, more scientific methods and concludes that the metal fragments are causing the illnesses, and, with Talur's help, attempts to urge the villagers to get rid of them. Instead, the villagers attack Data, believing him to be the cause for the illness, and cause his mechanical innards to be exposed. When Gia sees this, she is alarmed, but then realizes that Data is trying to help them. Data is able to prepare an antidote for the poisoning, administering it to Garvin and Gia, and doses the entire village by putting the rest of the antidote in the village's well. The villagers, still angry at him, attack Data, apparently killing him. Garvin and Gia bury Data, and bury the metal fragments in the forest outside of town. When Riker and Crusher arrive under the guise of friends of Jayden, they learn of his fate from Gia, and Riker tells her Data's true name. Data's body and the metal fragments are beamed to the Enterprise. Data's functions are restored, but he has no memory of his life as "Jayden". He theorizes that his positronic brain must have been overloaded from a power surge from the probe as he recovered the fragments, leading to his memory loss.

A separate plot during these events follows Deanna Troi's efforts to become a bridge officer. She easily passes all of the required examinations except one – a holodeck simulation, supervised by Riker and meant to test her command abilities. After several failed attempts to save a badly damaged Enterprise without putting anyone at risk, Troi eventually realizes that she may not be able to avoid sacrificing some of the crew, and orders the holographic Geordi to perform repairs in a hazardous area that will quickly kill him. She passes the test and earns a promotion to Commander.

== Production ==
Captain Picard appears only briefly in the episode, since it was filmed in December 1993 while Patrick Stewart was appearing in A Christmas Carol on-stage in London.

== Reception ==
In 2020, Tom's Guide listed this having some of the best moments for Enterprise D counselor Deanna Troi.

== Video releases ==
This was released in Japan on LaserDisc on October 9, 1998 as part of the half-season collection Log.14: Seventh Season Part.2. This set included episodes from "Lower Decks" to Part II of "All Good Things", with English and Japanese audio tracks.
