= Ronnie Claire Edwards =

American actress

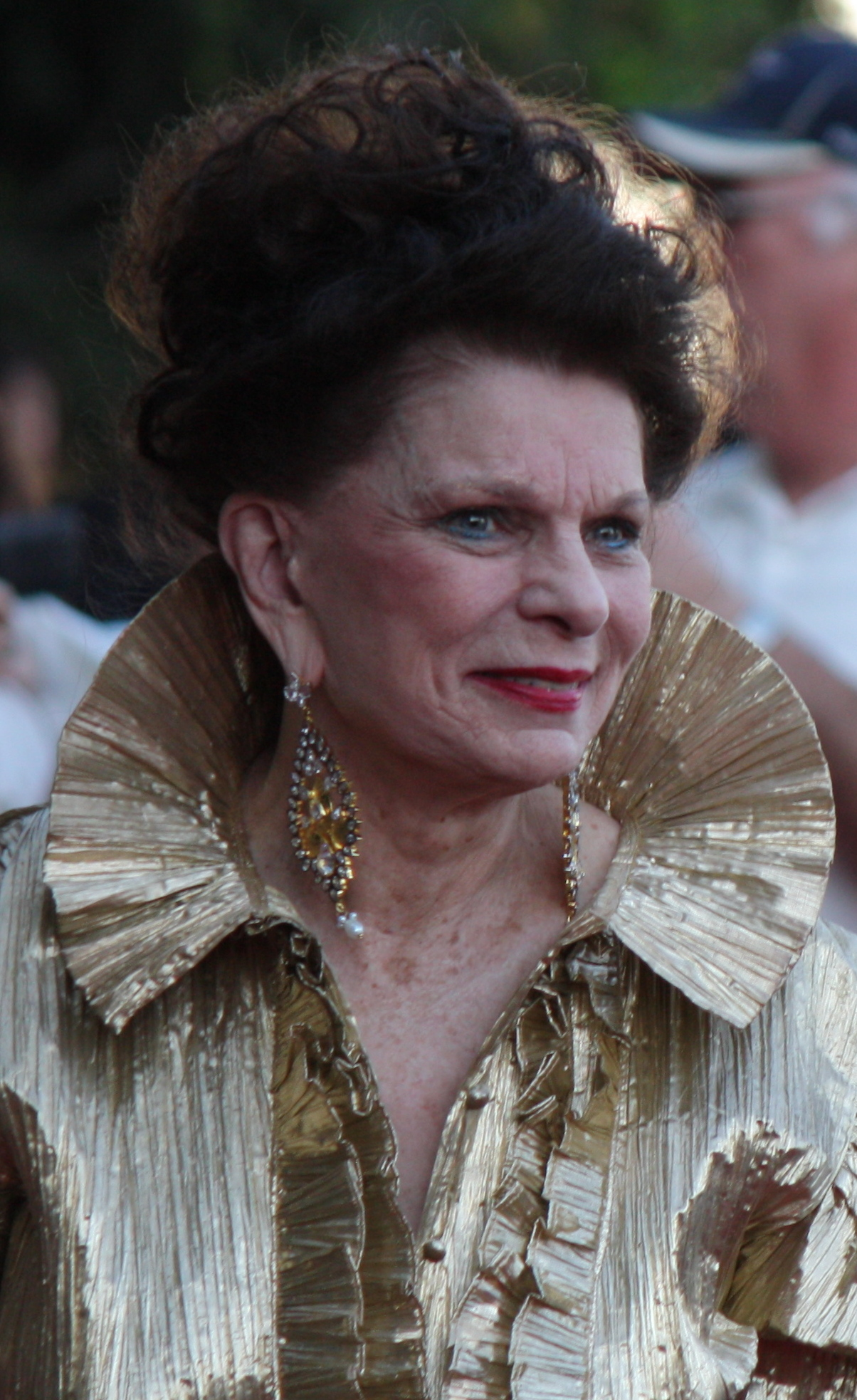
- Edwards at The Waltons 40th Anniversary in 2012
- Born: February 9, 1933; Oklahoma City, Oklahoma, U.S.
- Died: June 14, 2016 (aged 83); Dallas, Texas, U.S.
- Education: University of Oklahoma
- Occupation: Actress
- Years active: 1963–2007
- Spouse: Robert Kenneth Sands (m. 1959)

Ronnie Claire Edwards (February 9, 1933 – June 14, 2016) was an American actress, best known for playing Corabeth Walton Godsey on the TV series The Waltons.

== Early life ==
Edwards was born on February 9, 1933, and raised in Oklahoma City, Oklahoma. Her parents were Mr. and Mrs. Warren Edwards. Her father was county attorney. She attended Classen High School.

Edwards graduated from the University of Oklahoma with a fine arts degree in drama. While she was there her acting resulted in her being named best supporting actress for her work in He Who Gets Slapped and best character actress for her performance in Romeo and Juliet. She also received the buffalo mask, the university's highest award for a drama major. She supplemented her university education with studies at the Herbert Berghof School of Dramatic Arts in New York City.

== Acting career ==
In the summer of 1954 Edwards acted with the Virginia City Players in Virginia City, Montana. She returned to that troupe in August 1956 to play the lead in The Doctor in Spite of Himself. Between those two engagements she performed with the Margo Jones Theater in Dallas, Texas, and the Imperial Players in Cripple Creek, Colorado. In 1959, when she was performing at the Cleveland Play House, Edwards received acclaim in the Cleveland Press for her work all season, highlighted by her portrayal of Blanche DuBois in A Streetcar Named Desire. Her involvement with the Play House came via her selection as a Ford Foundation fellow, one of 15 selected for the Play House from 300 applicants. When she finished the season in Cleveland she went to Memphis to portray Maggie in Cat on a Hot Tin Roof for the Front Street Theater's 16-week summer season.

Edwards acted professionally from 1963 and is best known for the role of the domineering Corabeth Walton Godsey, the wife of storekeeper Ike Godsey played by Joe Conley, in the CBS television series The Waltons, created by Earl Hamner, Jr. She played Charlene's mother Ione Frazier on two episodes of CBS's Designing Women. In 1983, Edwards played Aunt Dolly in Hamner's series Boone, which was cancelled after 10 episodes had aired. She co-starred in the NBC series Sara (1985) opposite Geena Davis. She briefly appeared on an episode of PBS's Antiques Roadshow (2008) from Dallas, Texas, when she brought in for appraisal a chair formerly owned by P.T. Barnum. She also appeared in the Star Trek: The Next Generation episode "Thine Own Self" and the remake of Inherit the Wind (1999).

In 2008, HBO decided not to air the television series 12 Miles of Bad Road, in which Edwards had a role. She subsequently retired from acting.

Her work in films included The Dead Pool (1988).

On Broadway Edwards portrayed Mary Moylan in The Trial of the Catonsville Nine (1927), Florence in The Lincoln Mask (1972), and Lucille and Jewel in Patio / Porch (1978).

== Other ==
Edwards was the author of several books, including memoirs published in 2012. In 2000, The Knife Thrower's Assistant: Memoirs of a Human Target was published. She previously had created and performed a one-woman show under the same title, which she took to the Edinburgh Fringe in 1993. She also co-wrote a musical play Idols of the King as a tribute to Elvis Presley's career, legacy and most passionate fans.

== Personal life and death ==
Edwards married Robert Kenneth Sands on December 12, 1959, in Oklahoma City. She restored a 1911 Catholic church on Swiss Avenue in Dallas and made it her home after selling her mansion in Los Angeles to Red Hot Chili Peppers bassist Flea in 2008. She died of chronic obstructive pulmonary disease in her sleep on June 14, 2016, at age 83.

== Filmography ==
=== Film ===
| Year | Title | Role |
|---|---|---|
| 1963 | All the Way Home | Sally |
| 1978 | Five Days from Home | Marian Lemoore |
| 1980 | Getting Wasted | Mrs. Carson |
| 1985 | Perfect | Melody |
| 1986 | Nobody's Fool | Bingo |
| 1988 | The Dead Pool | Molly Fisher |
| 1994 | 8 Seconds | Carolyn Kyle |
| 2000 | Sordid Lives | Funeral Guest |
| 2002 | A Day Out with Gordy | Flo |

=== Television ===
| Year | Title | Role | Notes |
|---|---|---|---|
| 1974 | The American Parade | | "The 34th Star" |
| 1974 | Paper Moon | | "Gimme That Old Time Relation" |
| 1974 | This Is the West That Was | | TV film |
| 1975–1981 | The Waltons | Corabeth Walton Godsey | Recurring role |
| 1976 | Future Cop | Dr. Avery | "Pilot" |
| 1978 | When Every Day Was the Fourth of July | Mrs. Najarian | TV film |
| 1982 | A Wedding on Walton's Mountain | Corabeth Walton Godsey | TV film |
| 1982 | Mother's Day on Walton's Mountain | Corabeth Walton Godsey | TV film |
| 1982 | A Day for Thanks on Walton's Mountain | Corabeth Walton Godsey | TV film |
| 1983–1984 | Boone | Aunt Dolly Sawyer | Main role |
| 1984 | Dallas | Lydia | "Barbecue Five" |
| 1985 | Falcon Crest | Maxie McCoy | "Vicious Circle" |
| 1985 | Sara | Helen Newcomb | Main role |
| 1985 | Crazy Like a Fox | | "Desert Fox" |
| 1985 | Dynasty | Sister Theresa | "The Gown", "The Titans" |
| 1987–1988 | Designing Women | Ione Frazier | "Nashville Bound", "Come on and Marry Me, Bill" |
| 1988 | Just in Time | Carly Hightower | Main role |
| 1988 | Murder, She Wrote | Sylvia McMasters | "Snow White, Blood Red" |
| 1989 | Sweet Bird of Youth | Aunt Nonnie | TV film |
| 1990 | In the Heat of the Night | Lorraine Reeves | "Perversions of Justice" |
| 1990 | Guess Who's Coming for Christmas? | Martha | TV film |
| 1991 | The Torkelsons | Bootsie | "The Cotillion", "A Kiss Is Still a Kiss", "For Love or Money", "Men Don't Leave" |
| 1993 | A Walton Thanksgiving Reunion | Corabeth Walton | TV film |
| 1994 | Star Trek: The Next Generation | Talur | "Thine Own Self" |
| 1994 | A Walton Wedding | Corabeth Walton Godsey | TV film |
| 1999 | Inherit the Wind | Mrs. Haley | TV film |
| 2003 | Sweet Potato Queens | | TV film |
| 2007 | 12 Miles of Bad Road | Harlene | "Collateral Verbiage", "Moonshadow", (final appearance) |
