= Dangerous Curves (TV series) =

- Genre: Detective fiction
- Created by: David Paulsen; Leonard Katzman
- Starring: Lise Cutter; Michael Michele
- Composers: Larry Weir; Tom Weir; Michael Parnell
- Country of origin: United States
- Original language: English
- No. of seasons: 2
- No. of episodes: 34

Production
- Production locations: Dallas, Texas
- Production company: Hemisphere Group

Original release
- Network: CBS
- Release: February 26, 1992 – May 19, 1993

Dangerous Curves is an American television series that aired on CBS as part of its late night umbrella series lineup, Crimetime After Primetime. The private detective series premiered in February 1992 and ran through May 1993, airing two seasons of 34 episodes. CBS continued to air reruns of the show between September and December 1993.

== Plot ==
The series follows Gina McKay (Lise Cutter) and Holly Williams (Michael Michele), two former police officers, who work for the Personal Touch security service in Dallas, Texas, as they protect property and people from thieves and assassins. Early in the series, their boss is Marina Bonnelle (Diane Bellego), thus making Personal Touch security service an all-female operation. However she is replaced by Alexandre Dorleac (François-Éric Gendron), an agent for an Interpol-like agency that deals with international criminals and terrorists, expanding the focus of Gina's and Holly's casework. Gina's lover, Lt. Ozzie Bird, is a Dallas police detective who helps Gina and Holly with information and occasionally cases.

== Cast ==
- Lise Cutter as Gina McKay
- Michael Michele as Holly Williams
- Gregory McKinney as Lt. Ozzie Bird
- Diane Bellego as Marina Bonnelle (season 1)
- François-Éric Gendron as Alexandre Dorleac (season 2)

== Episodes ==
=== Series overview ===
Season	Episodes	Originally released	
Season	Episodes	First released	Last released
1	12	February 26, 1992	June 17, 1992
2	22	September 16, 1992	May 19, 1993

==== Broadcast history ====
- Wednesdays 11:30 p.m.–12:30 a.m. (February 1992 – June 1992)
- Wednesdays 12:35 a.m.–1:35 a.m. (September 1992 – May 1993)

=== Season 1 (1992) ===
No. overall	No. in season	Title	Original release date	Prod. code
1	1	"The Wedding" "An Eye for an Eye"	February 26, 1992	103
2	2	"Auld Lang Syne"	March 4, 1992	104
3	3	"Deathwatch"	March 11, 1992	105
4	4	"Die Laughing"	March 18, 1992	102
5	5	"Cast the First Stone"	March 25, 1992	106
6	6	"Nightmare"	April 1, 1992	107
7	7	"Back and to the Left"	April 29, 1992	108
8	8	"Deadlier Than the Male"	May 13, 1992	109
9	9	"Touch of Crass"	May 20, 1992	101
10	10	"Killing Rock"	May 20, 1992	110
11	11	"Intent to Kill"	June 3, 1992	111
12	12	"Obsession"	June 17, 1992	112

=== Season 2 (1992–93) ===
No. overall	No. in season	Title	Original release date	Prod. code
13	1	"Death by Chocolate"	September 16, 1992	TBA
14	2	"Daddy Dearest"	September 23, 1992	TBA
15	3	"The Spanish Connection"	September 30, 1992	TBA
16	4	"Muscle Boys"	October 14, 1992	TBA
17	5	"Old Acquaintance"	October 21, 1992	TBA
18	6	"Paint by Numbers"	October 28, 1992	TBA
19	7	"In the Name of Love"	November 4, 1992	TBA
20	8	"Vendetta"	November 11, 1992	TBA
21	9	"Triangle" "Ozzie's Secret"	November 18, 1992	TBA
22	10	"Cross Your Heart"	November 25, 1992	TBA
23	11	"The French Defection"	February 10, 1993	TBA
24	12	"Rainbow Serpent"	February 17, 1993	TBA
25	13	"What You Don't Know Can Kill You"	February 24, 1993	TBA
26	14	"Let Us Prey"	March 3, 1993	TBA
27	15	"One Man's Fantasy"	March 10, 1993	TBA
28	16	"Flashback"	April 7, 1993	TBA
29	17	"Crack Up"	April 14, 1993	TBA
30	18	"The Abyss"	April 21, 1993	TBA
31	19	"Lovers and Other Losers"	April 28, 1993	TBA
32	20	"My Eyes Abhor You"	May 5, 1993	TBA
33	21	"One Witness Too Many"	May 12, 1993	TBA
34	22	"Strangers"	May 19, 1993	TBA

== Reception ==
Dangerous Curves was not well received critically. David Hiltbrand of People magazine gave the show a grade of "C+" and commented that the show's "writing and acting are flat", but added "the pretty faces and itchy trigger fingers make this a good fit for CBS's late-night rotation, Crimetime After Primetime". Ken Tucker of Entertainment Weekly dismissed the series as "CBS' latest addition to its ”Crime Time After Prime Time” schlock action hours", adding jokingly, "”It’s too tame to get you all hot and bothered!” is more like it."
