= Lise Cutter =

American actress

- Born: July 31, 1959 (age 66); Palmdale, California, U.S.
- Occupation: Actress
- Years active: 1979–1995

Lise Cutter (born July 31, 1959) is an American actress who is known for her roles as Susan Campbell on Perfect Strangers, and as Gina McKay on Dangerous Curves.

== Filmography ==
=== Film ===
Year	Title	Role	Notes
1987	Buy & Cell	Dr. Ellen Scott	
1990	Havana	Patty	
1992	Nickel & Dime	Cathleen Markson	
1992	Shadow Force	Mary Denton	
1994	Sioux City	Allison	also known as Ultimate Revenge
1994	Fleshtone	Jennifer Womak	

=== Television ===
Year	Title	Role	Notes
1985	Dallas	Model	Episode: "Legacy of Hate"
1986	Remington Steele	Triathlon Worker	Episode: "Steele in the Running"
1986	Perfect Strangers	Susan Campbell	Recurring role (seasons 1–2), 8 episodes (and unaired pilot)
1987	Matlock	Kathy Dawson – Nurse	Episode: "The Nurse"
1987	L.A. Law	Lucinda Bonner	Episode: "Oy Vey! Wilderness!"
1987	Desperado	Nora Malloy	Television movie
1988	Frank's Place	Alexandra 'Pudd'n' Boatwright	Episode: "Shorty's Belle"
1988	Desperado: Avalanche at Devil's Ridge	Nora	Television movie
1988	Lovers, Partners & Spies	Satin Carlyle	also known as Satin's Touch; unsuccessful television pilot(?)
1989	MacGyver	Professor Zoe Ryan	Episodes: "Legend of the Holy Rose: Part 1", "Legend of the Holy Rose: Part 2"
1989	Desperado: The Outlaw Wars	Nora	Television movie
1989	21 Jump Street	Cheryl	Episode: "Things We Said Today"
1990	Equal Justice	Andrea Kanin	Episode: Pilot
1990	Jake and the Fatman	Kathy Jameson	Episode: "Goodbye"
1990, 1994	Murder, She Wrote	Tillie Bascomb / Melissa Maddox / Terry Deauville	Episodes: "Good-Bye Charlie", "Deadly Misunderstanding", "Murder by Twos"
1992	Civil Wars	Julia Hemmings	Episode: "Honi Soit Qui Mal Y Pense"
1992–93	Dangerous Curves	Gina McKay / Jessie Halloran (1 episode)	Lead role, 34 episodes
1994	Walker, Texas Ranger	Pamela	Episode: "Rampage"
1994	Renegade	Reba Cross	Episode: "Rustler's Rodeo"
1995	The Cosby Mysteries	FBI Agent	Episode: "Goldilocks"
