= Bronson Pinchot =

American actor (born 1959)

- Pinchot in 2026
- Born: May 20, 1959 (age 67); New York City, U.S.
- Education: Yale University (BA, MFA)
- Occupation: Actor
- Years active: 1983–present

Bronson Alcott Pinchot (/ˈpɪntʃoʊ/; born May 20, 1959) is an American actor. He made his television debut as Dennis Kemper, one of the earliest regular gay characters on an American television series, on the 1985 NBC sitcom Sara. Pinchot is known for playing Balki Bartokomous on the ABC sitcom Perfect Strangers (1986–1993), for which he was nominated for a Primetime Emmy Award for Outstanding Lead Actor in a Comedy Series, and Serge in the Beverly Hills Cop film series (1984–2024).

Pinchot has also performed in films including Risky Business (1983), The Flamingo Kid (1984), After Hours (1985), True Romance (1993), Courage Under Fire and The First Wives Club (both 1996), and in television series such as Lois & Clark: The New Adventures of Superman (1994–1995), Clueless (1996), Ray Donovan (2015), Chilling Adventures of Sabrina (2018–2020), Lodge 49 (2019) and The Residence (2025). In 2012, he starred in his own reality series, The Bronson Pinchot Project, on the DIY Network.

Pinchot has worked extensively as an audiobook narrator, with over 400 recordings as of 2024. In 2010, he was named as AudioFile magazine's Best Voice in Fiction & Classic and Audible's Narrator of the Year. Pinchot has also won six Audie Awards, including for Male Solo Narration for his rendering of Christopher Healy's The Hero's Guide to Being an Outlaw (2012).

== Early life ==
Pinchot was born in New York City on May 20, 1959. He grew up with his mother, two brothers, and a sister. His mother, Rosina, was a typist and house cleaner, while his father, a bookbinder born in New York and raised in Paris, abandoned the family. This abandonment plunged the family into poverty. Pinchot's paternal grandparents were Russian immigrants who settled in France following the Russian Revolution. Upon returning to the United States, his father changed the family surname from Poncharavsky to Pinchot.

When Pinchot was two and a half years old, the family moved to South Pasadena, California. In school, he faced bullying and was often mocked for his appearance, being called "ugly" and "fat". Pinchot excelled academically, graduating at the top of his class from South Pasadena High School. His achievements earned him a full scholarship to Yale University, where he lived at Morse College. Although he initially planned to study fine arts, he ultimately majored in theater studies, graduating with honors. After college, a casting director discovered Pinchot, which led to his film debut in Risky Business.

== Career ==
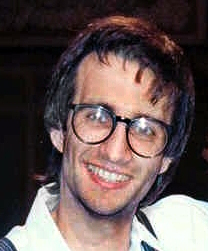
Pinchot at the 39th Primetime Emmy Awards, 1987

Pinchot appeared in several feature films, such as Hot Resort, Risky Business, Beverly Hills Cop, The First Wives Club, True Romance, Courage Under Fire, and It's My Party. He also played Dennis Kemper in the short-lived NBC sitcom Sara. Pinchot was hired to replace Fisher Stevens as Ben Jabituya in the 1986 film Short Circuit, but Pinchot eventually left the production in order to begin work on Perfect Strangers, and Stevens was subsequently rehired for the role.

Starting in 1986, Pinchot played Balki Bartokomous on the long-running ABC sitcom Perfect Strangers. When the show concluded filming its eight-season run in September 1992 (with the condensed final season airing during mid- 1993), Pinchot secured the starring role on a new sitcom for CBS, entitled The Trouble with Larry. The series premiered just three weeks after ABC's Perfect Strangers finale in August 1993, and one episode (which never aired) was directed by Mark Linn-Baker, Pinchot's co-star on Strangers. After three weeks of dismal ratings and poor reviews, The Trouble with Larry was canceled. Pinchot would subsequently be rehired by Perfect Strangers producers Tom Miller and Bob Boyett for roles on two more of their sitcoms: Step By Step where he played French hairdresser Jean-Luc Rieupeyroux in early 1997, and late the same year in Meego where he played an alien who crash-landed on Earth.

In 2008, Pinchot read the audio version of The Learners, author Chip Kidd's followup to The Cheese Monkeys. He also voiced Max, the fully restored Black 1964 VW Beetle, in the 2009 Volkswagen "Das Auto" campaign. Between 2009 and 2014, Pinchot narrated over 100 audiobooks. In 2010, Pinchot read the audio version of the novels Matterhorn and Blood Oath. For the Blackstone Audio collection Patricia Highsmith: Selected Novels and Short Stories, he provided a reading of several stories, including Strangers on a Train. Pinchot also narrated for Christopher Healy's children's series, The Hero's Guide. He was recognized for his work with a number of awards, including Audible.com's 2010 Narrator of the Year.

On February 12, 2012, Pinchot starred in a home restoration show on DIY Network titled The Bronson Pinchot Project. The program was based on his hobby of restoring old homes using salvaged materials. On March 8, 2018, it was announced that Pinchot would play George Hawthorne, the villainous, puritanical principal of Baxter High, who regularly clashes with Sabrina Spellman and her friends in the Netflix series The Chilling Adventures of Sabrina. The series premiered in October 2018.

In 1999, he spent a great deal of time in Harford, Pennsylvania, restoring the circa 1839 mansion built by Joab Tyler (father of historian William Seymour Tyler) and later inhabited by former Pennsylvania state Senator Edward E. Jones. Pinchot purchased six properties in the small rural town of 1,300 residents "in an effort to revive the town's 19th-century aesthetic". In 2015 he filed for Chapter 13 bankruptcy, claiming liabilities between $100,000 and $500,000. All of his properties in Harford were subsequently put up for sale. Pinchot told the Wilkes-Barre Citizens' Voice, "I have two skills: I can make old houses beautiful and I can make people laugh. Other than that I'm a waste of space. Well, I'm a dedicated son and brother, but I have no head for businesses." By April 2017, he owned two tiny homes, one measuring 77 square feet, the other 153 square feet.

== Filmography ==
=== Film ===
Year	Title	Role	Notes
1983	Risky Business	Barry	
1984	Beverly Hills Cop	Serge	Between Two Women, photographer, 1986
1984	The Flamingo Kid	Alfred Schultz	
1985	Hot Resort	Brad	
1985	After Hours	Lloyd	
1989	Second Sight	Bobby McGee	
1992	Blame It on the Bellboy	Bellboy	
1993	True Romance	Elliot Blitzer	
1993	Jungledyret Hugo	Hugo (voice)	English version
1994	Beverly Hills Cop III	Serge	
1995	Napoleon	Birdo (voice)	American version
1996	It's My Party	Monty Tipton	
1996	Courage Under Fire	Bruno	
1996	The First Wives Club	Duarto Feliz	
1996	Jungledyret Hugo 2 - den store filmhelt (1996)	Hugo (voice)	English version
1997	Babes in Toyland	Rodrigo (voice)	
1998	Slappy and the Stinkers	Roy	
1998	Quest for Camelot	Griffin (voice)	
1998	Beach Movie	Ronald	a.k.a. Boardheads
1999	Out of the Cold	Max Kaplan	
1999	The All New Adventures of Laurel & Hardy in For Love or Mummy	Stanley	
2001	Lady and the Tramp II: Scamp's Adventure	Francois (voice)	Direct-to-video
2001	Putting It Together: Direct from Broadway	The Narrator	
2002	Winning Girls Through Psychic Mind Control	Devon Sharpe	
2003	Straight No Chaser	Josh Peters	Short
2004	Second Best	'Doc' Klingenstein	
2005	Diamond Zero	Bergerac De La Houssey	AKA: IceMaker
2007	The Wager	Colin Buchanan	
2007	Mr. Art Critic	M.J. Clayton	
2008	From a Place of Darkness	Carl	
2008	The Tale of Despereaux	Town Crier (voice)	
2009	Hooking Up	Mr. Kimbal (voice)	
2009	Good Clean Fun	Dean Vernon	
2010	Pure Country 2: The Gift	Joseph	
2011	You and I	Torrino	
2012	Virgin Alexander	Bim Norse	
2013	Kung-Fu and Titties	The Beaver	
2015	The Strike	Carlo Lombardi	
2017	Double Play	Bob	
2024	Beverly Hills Cop: Axel F	Serge	

=== Television ===
Year	Title	Role	Notes
1985	Sara	Dennis Kemper	13 episodes
1985	Amazing Stories	Director	Episode: "Mummy Daddy"
1986	Dave Thomas: The Incredible Time Travels of Henry Osgood	Charles Dickens	Television film
1986	Between Two Women	Photographer	Television film
1986–1993	Perfect Strangers	Balki Bartokomous / Mama / Cousin Bartok	150 episodes
1990	ABC TGIF	Balki	Promotional programming
1990	The Great American Sex Scandal	Sanford Lagelfost / Jorge Jimenez / Arthur Lloyd / Magda	Television film
1992	Eek! The Cat	Additional voices	
1992	Disney's Christmas Fantasy On Ice	Uncle Bronny / Jack Frost	Television special
1993	The Trouble with Larry	Larry Burton	7 episodes
1994/1995	Lois & Clark: The New Adventures of Superman	Kyle Griffin / The Prankster	2 episodes
1995	The Langoliers	Craig Toomey	Miniseries; 2 episodes
1995	Dumb and Dumber	Dymbster (voice)	2 episodes
1995	The Adventures of Hyperman	Valerie Knockisblokov (voice)	Episode: "Cosmo Not/The Brain Game"
1996	High Society	Arthur Zipkin	Episode: "Nip and Tuck"
1996	Duckman	Dr. Henri Ducharme (voice)	Episode: "A Room with a Bellevue"
1996	3rd Rock from the Sun	Roy Albright	Episode: "Ab-dick-ted"
1996	Bruno the Kid	General Armando Castrato (voice)	36 episodes
1996	Adventures from the Book of Virtues	The Man / The Dog (voices)	Episode: "Work"
1996	Clueless	Mr. Pomormo / Ka-feen	2 episodes
1996; 1997	Aaahh!!! Real Monsters	Dietrich Duchump; Deitrich Dunlap (voices)	"Amulet of Enfarg/Bad Hair Day" "The Lips Have It/Escape Claws"
1997	Meego	Meego	13 episodes
1997	High Incident	Matt Shukat	Episode: "Show Me the Money"
1997	The Angry Beavers	Truman / Brat (voices)	Episode: "House Broken/Stinky Toe"
1997	I Am Weasel	Oscar / Guard / Old Wardrobe Man (voices)	Episode: "I Are Big Star"
1997	Step by Step	Jean-Luc Rieupeyroux / Black Bart	24 episodes
1997	Merry Christmas, George Bailey	Mr. Carter	Television film
1997; 2000	Happily Ever After: Fairy Tales for Every Child	Sonny the Toad / Killer Whale / Reindeer (voices)	"Thumbelina" "The Snow Queen"
1998	Hey Arnold!	Ronnie Matthews / Director / Chauffeur (voices)	2 episodes
1999	The Wild Thornberrys	Franz Fensterkopf (voice)	2 episodes
2000	Buzz Lightyear of Star Command	Shakey / Science (voices)	Episode: "Haunted Moon"
2002	Breaking News	Phillip	Episode: "Spin Art
2003	All Grown Up!	Pepe (voice)	Episode: "Chuckie's in Love"
2005	The Surreal Life	Himself	Season 5 Castmember
2005	Law & Order: Criminal Intent	Dr. Greg Ross	Episode: "Beast"
2007	Six Degrees	Thomas Johnson	Episode: "Ray's Back"
2007	Law & Order: Special Victims Unit	Dr. Henry Carlisle	Episode: "Alternate"
2008	The Young and the Restless	Patrick Dalton	6 episodes
2010	Hawaii Five-0	Bastille	Episode: "Mana'o"
2011	The Problem Solverz	AI (voice)	Episode: "Videogamez"
2011	Shake It Up	Kashlack Hessenheffer	Episode: "Vatalihootsit It Up"
2012–2013	The Bronson Pinchot Project	Himself (host)	20 episodes
2014	NCIS	George Burton	Episode: "Parental Guidance Suggested"
2015	The Mysteries of Laura	Head Chef J.T. Thompson	Episode: "The Mystery of the Frozen Foodie"
2015	Ray Donovan	Flip Brightman	2 episodes
2017	The Untitled Action Bronson Show	Himself	Season 1 Episode 3
2018–2020	Chilling Adventures of Sabrina	George Hawthorne	Recurring role, 8 episodes
2019	A Million Little Things	Berge	Episode: "Twelve Seconds"
2019	Lodge 49	Dr. Kimbrough	3 episodes
2020	Project Blue Book	David Dubrovsky	Episode: "Close Encounters"
2021	Black Monday	Douglas Blackmore	Episode: "Four!"
2022	NCIS: Hawaiʻi	Darrin Schwartz	Episode: "Nurture"
2022	The Mysterious Benedict Society	Yanis	Episode: "Commitment to All Things Cozy"
2023	Our Flag Means Death	Ned Lowe	Episode: "Calypso's Birthday"
2025	The Residence	Didier Gotthard	8 episodes
TBA	Bishop †	Dougray Dillon	TBD episodes

Key
†	Denotes television productions that have not yet been released

=== Music videos ===
Year	Title	Role	Artist
1984	"Neutron Dance"	Theater Manager	The Pointer Sisters

== Awards and nominations ==
Year	Association	Category	Work	Result
1987	People’s Choice Awards	Favorite Actor in a New TV Program	Perfect Strangers	Nominated
1987	Primetime Emmy Awards	Outstanding Lead Actor in a Comedy Series	Perfect Strangers	Nominated
1996	National Board of Review	Best Cast	The First Wives Club	Won
2009	Audie Awards	Humor	The Learners by Chip Kidd	Won
2011	Orlando Film Festival	Best Supporting Performance	Virgin Alexander	Nominated
2011	Audie Awards	Distinguished Achievement in Production	Chapters from My Autobiography by Mark Twain	Nominated
2012	Audie Awards	Fantasy	Rumo & His Miraculous Adventures by Walter Moers	Nominated
2012	Audie Awards	Non-Fiction	My Korean Deli by Ben Ryder Howe	Nominated
2012	Audie Awards	Paranormal	Hard Magic by Larry Correia	Won
2012	Audie Awards	Solo Narration — Male	Hard Magic by Larry Correia	Nominated
2012	Audie Awards	Thriller/Suspense	Unknown [Out of My Head] by Didier van Cauwelaert	Nominated
2013	Audie Awards	Paranormal	Spellbound by Larry Correia	Won
2013	Audie Awards	Thriller/Suspense	Red, White, and Blood by Christopher Farnsworth	Won
2014	Audie Awards	Paranormal	Warbound by Larry Correia	Nominated
2014	Audie Awards	Solo Narration — Male	Warbound by Larry Correia	Nominated
2015	Audie Awards	Solo Narration — Male	The Hero's Guide to Being an Outlaw by Christopher Healy	Won
2015	Audie Awards	Children's Titles for Ages 8–12	The Hero's Guide to Being an Outlaw by Christopher Healy	Nominated
2015	Audie Awards	Thriller/Suspense	Dead Six by Larry Correia and Mike Kupari	Nominated
2016	Audie Awards	History/Biography	A Man on the Moon: The Voyages of the Apollo Astronauts by Andrew Chaikin and Tom Hanks	Won
2016	Voice Arts Awards	Audiobook Narration – Fantasy, Best Narrator	The Anubis Gates by Tim Powers	Won
2021	Audie Awards	Science Fiction	Aliens: Phalanx by Scott Sigler	Nominated
