= Barry O'Brien =

American screenwriter

- Born: 1957 (age 68–69); San Francisco, California, U.S.
- Education: Terra Linda High School, Santa Clara University
- Occupations: Screenwriter, producer
- Spouse: Rachel O'Brien
- Children: 2
- Writing career
- Genres: Children's books, suspense, crime fiction, action, adventure, humour
- Notable work: Hannah Montana

Barry O'Brien (born 1957) is an American television writer and producer best known as the co-creator of Disney Channel Original Series Hannah Montana. His credits include Happy Days, Perfect Strangers, Hangin' with Mr. Cooper, Judging Amy, and CSI: Miami.

== Life ==
Barry O'Brien was born in San Francisco, California, to a large Irish Catholic family. He attended Terra Linda High School, before joining Santa Clara University on a football scholarship, studying business and finance.

O'Brien's biggest hit is Disney's Hannah Montana, a concept he successfully pitched based on the premise of an incredibly famous teenager-with-a-double-life, an idea conceived during a tenure on Nickelodeon's television series All That, where the (then) teenage American pop singer Britney Spears featured as a guest.

Aside from writing for television, O'Brien co-wrote Jerry Bruckheimer’s Kangaroo Jack, and two junior novels. He currently resides in Los Angeles, with his wife and two children.

== Filmography ==
- Happy Days (1981-1982) (writer)
- Laverne & Shirley (1982) (writer)
- Joanie Loves Chachi (1982) (writer)
- The New Odd Couple (1983) (writer)
- Silver Spoons (1984) (writer)
- Muppet Babies (1985) (writer)
- MoonDreamers (1986) (writer)
- The Love Boat (1984-1986) (writer)
- Ghostbusters (1986) (writer)
- Blondie & Dagwood (1987) (writer)
- Pinocchio and the Emperor of the Night (1987) (writer)
- Beverly Hills Teens (1987) (writer, developer)
- The Jetsons (1987) (writer)
- Fraggle Rock (1987) (writer)
- BraveStarr (1987) (writer)
- Alvin and the Chipmunks (1988) (writer)
- She's the Sheriff (1987–1989) (writer)
- Blondie & Dagwood: Second Wedding Workout (1989) (writer)
- Perfect Strangers (1987–1993) (supervising producer, writer)
- All-New Dennis the Menace (1993) (writer)
- Getting By (1993–1994) (writer, co-executive producer)
- Taz-Mania (1995) (writer)
- Hangin' with Mr. Cooper (1995–1996) (co-executive producer, writer)
- Between Brothers (1997–1999) (writer, executive producer, creator)
- Guys Like Us (1998) (executive producer, writer)
- Titans (2000–2001) (co-producer, writer)
- Gary & Mike (2001) (writer)
- Judging Amy (2002–2005) (writer, supervising producer)
- Kangaroo Jack (2003) (writer)
- Drake & Josh (2004) (writer: story) (one episode; "Football")
- CSI: Miami (2005–2012) (writer, executive producer)
- Hannah Montana (2006–2011) (writer, creator)
- The Einstein Factor (2007–2008) (supervising producer, writer, original concept)
- Touch (2013) (co-executive producer, writer)
- King & Maxwell (2013) (co-executive producer, writer)
- Intelligence (2014) (producer, writer)
- Dig (2015) (producer, writer)
- The Following (2015) (producer, writer)
- Castle (2015–2016) (producer, writer)
- Gone (2017–2018) (producer, writer)
- Lincoln Rhyme: Hunt for the Bone Collector (2020) (writer)
- Law & Order: Organized Crime (2022–present) (head writer)
- The Equalizer (2024–2025) (writer) (two episodes)

== Selected works ==
- Hannah Montana Bind Up #2 (Super Sneak/ Truth or Dare), with Laurie McElroy (Disney Press, 2009) (ISBN 978-1423121473)
- Ace London, with John Worsley, Kaj Melendez, and Mirza Javed (Fleetway Publications, 1962; Cuahtemoc Publishing Ltd, 2011) (ISBN 978-0957032101)

== Awards and nominations ==
Nominated for an Edgar Award for (the) Best Television Episode Teleplay of 2008. (CSI: Miami, You May Now Kill the Bride)

== See also ==
- Hannah Montana (Lawsuits)
