= Sara (1985 TV series) =

- The cast of Sara
- Genre: Sitcom
- Created by: Gary David Goldberg; Ruth Bennett
- Directed by: Will Mackenzie
- Starring: Geena Davis; Alfre Woodard; Bill Maher; Mark Hudson; Bronson Pinchot; Ronnie Claire Edwards; Matthew Lawrence
- Theme music composer: Candy Parton; Tom Scott
- Opening theme: You Got What it Takes
- Ending theme: You Got What it Takes (Instrumental)
- Composer: Tom Scott
- Country of origin: United States
- Original language: English
- No. of seasons: 1
- No. of episodes: 13

Production
- Executive producer: Gary David Goldberg
- Producers: Merrill Markoe; Linda Nieber
- Camera setup: Multi-camera
- Running time: 30 minutes
- Production companies: Ubu Productions; NBC Productions

Original release
- Network: NBC
- Release: January 23 – May 8, 1985

Sara is an American sitcom television series that aired on NBC from January 23 to May 8, 1985. Starring Geena Davis in the title role, the series features early performances from several actors who went on to greater acclaim, including Alfre Woodard, Bronson Pinchot and Bill Maher.

Sara featured one of the earliest regular gay characters on an American television series, Dennis Kemper, played by Pinchot.

== Plot ==
Sara McKenna, a young lawyer living in San Francisco, works at the Legal Aid law office with an eclectic cast of characters.

== Cast ==
- Geena Davis as Sara McKenna
- Alfre Woodard as Rozalyn Dupree
- Bill Maher as Marty Lang
- Mark Hudson as Stuart Webber
- Bronson Pinchot as Dennis Kemper
- Ronnie Claire Edwards as Helen Newcomb
- Matthew Lawrence as Jesse Webber

== Episodes ==
No.	Title	Directed by	Written by	Original release date
1	"David Returns"	Will Mackenzie	Ruth Bennett	January 23, 1985
2	"Sara's Mom"	John Pasquin	Merrill Markoe	January 30, 1985
3	"Dueling Lawyers"	Will Mackenzie	Michael Kagen	February 13, 1985
4	"Helen Steps Out"	John Pasquin	Merrill Markoe	February 20, 1985
5	"You Can't Win 'em All"	John Pasquin	Ruth Bennett	February 27, 1985
6	"A Date with Keith"	John Pasquin	Merrill Markoe	March 13, 1985
7	"Rock 'n' Roll Father"	Will Mackenzie	Michael Kagan	March 20, 1985
8	"27 Candles"	John Pasquin	Ruth Bennett	March 27, 1985
9	"Sara's Short Story"	Will Mackenzie	Gail Honigberg	April 10, 1985
10	"Meet Mr. Cooper"	Will Mackenzie	Douglas Wyman	April 17, 1985
11	"Girls Just Want to Have Fun"	Will Mackenzie	Susan Seeger	April 24, 1985
12	"A Night at the Ballet"	Unknown	Unknown	May 1, 1985
13	"Brief Encounter"	Will Mackenzie	Frederick Weiss & Jeffrey Ferro	May 8, 1985

== Reception ==
Because it was scheduled opposite Dynasty, which was then the most popular series on the air, Sara failed to attract an audience and was cancelled after 13 episodes, although NBC did re-air the series in 1988. According to TVTango.com's ratings database, Sara ranked 48th out of 104 programs that aired during the 1984–85 season, with an average household rating of 14.44.

== Accolades ==
The show was nominated for Outstanding Technical Direction and Camerawork at the 37th Primetime Emmy Awards.
