= Dale McRaven =

American producer and screenwriter (1939–2022)

- Born: Dale Keith McRaven; March 15, 1939; Pulaski, Illinois, U.S.
- Died: September 5, 2022 (aged 83); Porter Ranch, Los Angeles, California, U.S.
- Occupation(s): Producer, screenwriter
- Children: 2

Dale Keith McRaven (March 15, 1939 – September 5, 2022) was an American producer and screenwriter. He was perhaps best known for serving as the creator of Perfect Strangers, Angie, The Texas Wheelers and Mork & Mindy, which earned him a Primetime Emmy Award nomination in the category Outstanding Comedy Series. His nomination was shared with Bruce Johnson, Garry Marshall and Tony Marshall.

McRaven died on September 5, 2022, from complications of lung cancer at his home in Porter Ranch, California, at the age of 83.
