= Christine Lakin =

American actress (born 1979)

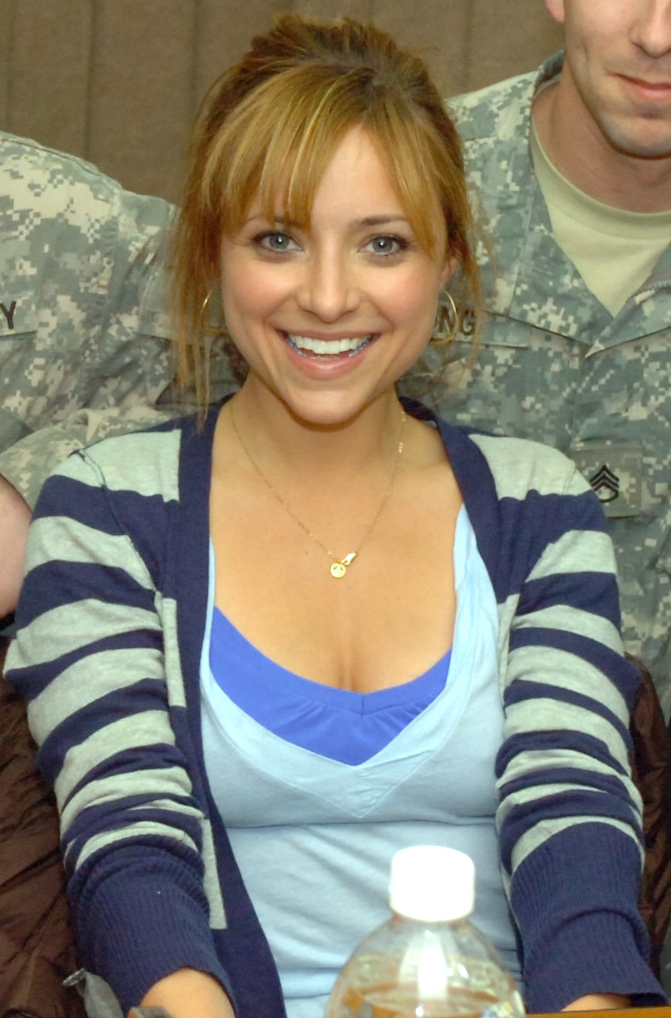
- Lakin at Camp Speicher in January 2009
- Born: January 25, 1979 (age 47)
- Occupations: Actress, director
- Years active: 1990–present
- Spouse: Brandon Breault (m. 2014)
- Children: 2

Christine Lakin (/ˈleɪkɪn/; born January 25, 1979) is an American actress and director. She is best known for her role as Alicia "Al" Lambert on the 1990s ABC/CBS sitcom Step by Step. She also played Joan of Arc on Showtime's Reefer Madness, was the sidekick on Craig Kilborn's 2010 Fox talk show The Kilborn File, and provides the voice of Joyce Kinney in Family Guy.

== Career ==
Lakin got her start acting in commercials, before landing her first major role as Young Rose in the American Civil War drama The Rose and the Jackal. That movie aired in 1990, one year before she was cast as Alicia Lambert, the tomboyish daughter, on Step by Step.

After Step by Step was cancelled in 1998, she also was in one episode of 7th Heaven, and continued to appear in television movies, such as Showtime's Reefer Madness and 2005's Who's Your Daddy?.

In 2006, she also appeared in a commercial called "But He Has Bud Light" that aired during Super Bowl XLI, in which her male companion wants to pick up a hitchhiker who has Bud Light beer in one hand and an axe in the other.

In 2008, she starred alongside Paris Hilton in the movie The Hottie and the Nottie, requiring extensive makeup to make her appear ugly. The film met dismal reviews in the United States.

In 2010, she became Craig Kilborn's sidekick (his "Huckleberry Friend" – a reference to his "favorite movie", Breakfast at Tiffany's) on The Kilborn File.

Beginning in 2013, she has narrated several audiobook adaptations. She also voiced the character Jane from The Walking Dead: Season Two video game and its sequel The Walking Dead: A New Frontier.

She is also the voice of news anchor Joyce Kinney in the animated sitcom Family Guy, debuting in the episode "Excellence in Broadcasting". She also featured as Lois's college friend Naomi, in a live table read of "Partial Terms of Endearment"; though not in the eventual episode.

She later starred in the Pop series Hollywood Darlings with fellow 1990s child stars Jodie Sweetin and Beverley Mitchell.

Lakin also has numerous television directing credits, including ten episodes (as of 2022) of ABC sitcom The Goldbergs, three episodes of 2019 Goldbergs spinoff sitcom Schooled, and three episodes of the 2021 Apple TV+ original series Puppy Place. She is set to make her feature directorial debut with I Won't Dance.

== Radio and podcast appearances ==
Lakin appeared on Ken Reid's TV Guidance Counselor podcast on March 11, 2016.

Lakin appeared on With Special Guest Lauren Lapkus on May 12, 2017.

Lakin appeared on Drinkin' Bros Podcast on April 8, 2018.

Lakin appeared on Pod Meets World episode titled "Christine Lakin Meets World" on October 3, 2022, discussing coming up in the entertainment industry. Hosted by Rider Strong, Will Friedle, and Danielle Fishel.

Lakin appeared on "Pop Culture Phenomen: The Podcast" on March 29, 2023.

Lakin has hosted the Step by Step rewatch podcast Keanan and Lakin Give You Déjà Vu with co-star Staci Keanan since February 28, 2024.

== Awards and nominations ==
She was nominated in 1993 for a Young Artist Award for Best Young Actress Starring in a Television Series and in 1994 for another Young Artist Award for Outstanding Youth Ensemble in a Television Series shared with Josh Byrne, Christopher Castile, Brandon Call, Staci Keanan and Angela Watson – both for Step by Step (1991). She also won a Golden Raspberry Award for Worst Screen Couple with Paris Hilton in The Hottie and the Nottie.

LA Weekly Theater Awards

- 2009: Won the award for Female Comedy Performance for the Havok Theatre Company production of Dog Sees God: Confessions of a Teenage Blockhead

Ovation Awards

- 2012: Nominated for Featured Actress in a Musical for the role of Julia in the Troubadour Theater Company production of Two Gentlemen of Chicago

== Personal life ==
Lakin married actor Brandon Breault in October 2014. In November 2015, the couple announced that they were expecting their first child. Their daughter was born on March 6, 2016. She gave birth to their son on September 10, 2018.

== Filmography ==
=== Film ===
Year	Title	Role	Notes
2000	Finding Kelly	Kelly Harrington	
2000	Boltneck	Macy	
2000	Whatever It Takes	Sloane	
2001	Buck Naked Arson	Becca	
2002	Getting Out	Natasha	Short film
2002	Who's Your Daddy?	Katie	
2003	Going Down	Jamie	
2004	Blue Demon	Katie	Video
2005	In Memory of My Father	Christine	
2005	Suits on the Loose	Danielle	
2006	The Cutting Edge: Going for the Gold	Luanne King	Video
2007	Georgia Rule	Grace Cunningham	
2007	Dark Mirror	Tammy	
2007	The Game Plan	Nichole	
2008	The Hottie and the Nottie	June Phigg	
2008	Chronic Town	Kelly	
2008	Patsy	Patsy	
2008	Red Canyon	Regina	
2009	Race to Witch Mountain	Sunday	
2009	Super Capers	Red	
2009	Buttf**ker	Skyler	Short film
2010	Valentine's Day	Heather	
2010	Elektra Luxx	Venus Azucar	
2010	Caught in the Crossfire	Tracy	
2010	Life's a Beach	Rebecca	
2010	Alpha and Omega	Reba (voice)	
2010	You Again	Taylor	
2010	Screwball: The Ted Whitfield Story	Kiki Hamilton	
2010	Just Married	Claire	Short film
2010	Darnell Dawkins: Mouth Guitar Legend	Wilimina Stansbury	
2011	Dead Space: Aftermath	Leslie Pallas	
2011	New Year's Eve	Waitress Alyssa	
2012	Jewtopia	Helen O'Connell	
2012	Parental Guidance	Helen	
2013	The Frankenstein Theory	Annie	
2014	Veronica Mars	Susan Knight	
2014	Small Town Santa	Lucy	
2014	Somebody's Mother	Maggie	Short film
2015	The Leisure Class	Carla	HBO's Project Greenlight season 4 film
2015	Helen Keller vs. Nightwolves	Zelda	
2016	Mother's Day	Railroad Crossing Hostess	
2016	Batman: Bad Blood	Reporter (voice)	Direct-to-video
2017	Jimmy The Saint	Petra	
2019	I Am That Man	Nicole Beckett	
2019	#3 Normandy Lane	Trisha	Short
2020	The Swan Princess: A Royal Wedding	Queen Uberta (voice)	as Catherine Lavitan
2022	Youtopia	Jade	
2023	Sisters	Dr. Thomas	

=== Television ===
Year	Title	Role	Notes
1990	The Rose and the Jackal	Little Rose	TV film
1991–1998	Step by Step	Alicia "Al" Lambert	Main role (160 episodes)
1998	7th Heaven	Cassandra	Episode: "Let's Talk About Sex"
1999	3rd Rock from the Sun	Michelle	Episode: "Dick Solomon of the Indiana Solomons"
1999	Promised Land	Dawn Sterling	Episode: "In the Money"
2000	Odd Man Out	Gwen	Episode: "My Life as a Dog"
2000	Seven Days	Karen	Episode: "Witch Way to Prom"
2000	Opposite Sex	Lisa	2 episodes
2000	Lost in Oz	Jade	Unsold TV pilot
2001	Ruling Class	Sara Olszewski	TV film
2002	Boston Public	Cindy	Episode: "Chapter 42"
2002	Touched by an Angel	Ashlee	Episode: "Two Sides to Every Angel"
2004	Combustion	Carmen	TV film
2004	Rodney	Ms. Preston	Episode: "Teacher"
2005	Reefer Madness	Joan of Arc	TV film
2005	Dirty Famous	Tanya Bremer	TV film
2005	Veronica Mars	Susan Knight	Episode: "Mars vs. Mars"
2005	Wild 'N Out	Herself	
2006	Mystery Woman: At First Sight	Francie McPhillips	TV film
2006	Sons & Daughters	Sydney	2 episodes
2006	One on One	Erin	Episode: "I Love L.A.: Part 1"
2007	The Loop	Leeza	Episode: "Stride"
2008	CSI: Crime Scene Investigation	Margo Delphi	Episode: "The Theory of Everything"
2008	Wainy Days	Nan	Episode: "Nan and Lucy"
2008–2009	Valentine	Kate Providence	Main role (8 episodes)
2009	Bones	Vanessa Newcomb	Episode: "The Bones That Foam"
2009	Rita Rocks	Stephanie	Recurring role (4 episodes)
2010–present	Family Guy	Joyce Kinney (voice), Various Voices	32 episodes
2010	The Iceman Chronicles	Barbie Pedderson	TV series
2010	NCIS	Rachel Wells	Episode: "Double Identity"
2011	Hellcats	Kelly	2 episodes
2011	Melissa & Joey	Jackie	4 episodes
2012	Stevie TV	Taylor Armstrong / Mackenzie's Mom	Episodes: "1.1", "1.2"
2012	Lovin' Lakin	Christine Lakin	TV miniseries
2012	CSI: NY	Courtney Jensen	Episode: "The Real McCoy"
2013	Police Guys	Christine Lakin	TV film
2014	Female Moments	Maude	Episode: "Stuck"
2014	TripTank	Claire / Christine (voice)	Episodes: "Roy & Ben's Day Off", "Candy Van Finger Bang", "XXX Overload"
2014	Clarence	Various	7 episodes
2014	Acting Dead	Snotty Casting Director	2 episodes
2016	Modern Family	Lisa Delaney	Episode: "Playdates"
2017–2018	Hollywood Darlings	Herself	Main role (16 episodes)
2018	The 5th Quarter	Dr. Maria Van Nostrand	Episode: "Procussion"
2019	Station 19	Emmanuelle	Episode: "When It Rains, It Pours!"
2019	American Housewife	Margaret	Episode: "The Dance"
2021	The Goldbergs	Beautiful Stranger	Episode: "Cocoon"
2023	The Rookie	Camille Baudelaire	Episode: "Double Trouble"

=== Director ===
Year	Title	Note(s)
2012	Lovin' Lakin	9 episodes; miniseries
2015	Image Doctors	Episode: "Elaine Stritch (Halloween Special)"
2017	Dancer By Trade	
2018–2023	The Goldbergs	12 episodes
2019–2020	Schooled	3 episodes
2021	Puppy Place	3 episodes
2022	High School Musical: The Musical: The Series	Episode: "Color War"

=== Video games ===
Year	Title	Role
2010	Medal of Honor	Gunfighter 1-1
2011	Might & Magic Heroes VI	Irina
2011	Uncharted: Golden Abyss	Marisa Chase
2012	Family Guy: Back to the Multiverse	Joyce Kinney
2013	The Walking Dead: Season Two	Jane
2014	WildStar	Mordesh Female, Lowborn Female
2016	Tom Clancy's Rainbow Six Siege	Valkyrie
2016	The Walking Dead: A New Frontier	Jane
2016	Star Wars: The Old Republic - Knights of the Eternal Throne	Additional Voices
2017	Mass Effect: Andromeda	Pelessaria 'Peebee' B'Sayle

== Theatre ==
Title	Role
Oedipus the King, Mama!	Antigone
Heathers: The Musical	Heather Duke
Big: The Musical	Choreographer
As U2 Like It	Choreographer
Alice 2: Through the Looking Glass	Choreographer
Zanna Don't!	Choreographer
Dog Sees God	Tricia
Happy Days: A Family Musical	Joanie Cunningham
Alice in One-Hit Wonderland	Alice
The Break Up Notebook: The Lesbian Musical	Casey / Sheila
Ann E. Wrecksick	Olivia Whorebucks
Wrong Turn at Lungfish	Anita / Nurse
Sneaux	Darla / Sissy
Silence! The Musical	Clarice Starling

== Audiobook narrations ==
Book	Author
The Royal We	Heather Cox and Jessica Morgan
The Heir Affair	Heather Cox and Jessica Morgan
After the Red Rain	Barry Lyga and Robert Defranco
Unmarked	Kami Garcia
The New Order	Chris Weitz
Glory O'Brien's History of the Future	A.S. King
Mercy Snow	Tiffany Baker
Broken Monsters	Lauren Beukes
The Coldest Girl in Coldtown	Holly Black
Imaginary Friend	Stephen Chbosky
Parasite	Mira Grant
Symbiont	Mira Grant
Chimera	Mira Grant
Into the Drowning Deep	Mira Grant
Cheater. Faker. Troublemaker.	Jenny Rosen
Dark Sacred Night	Michael Connelly
The Night Fire	Michael Connelly
The Dark Hours	Michael Connelly
Desert Star
The Lion's Den	Katherine St. John
