= Rosenfarb =

Rosenfarb is a surname. Notable people with the surname include:

- Bob Rosenfarb (1951/1952–2026), American television producer and writer
- Chava Rosenfarb (1923–2011), Holocaust survivor and Jewish-Canadian author of Yiddish poetry and novels
