= Brandon Call =

American actor

- Born: Brandon Spencer Lee Call; Torrance, California, U.S.
- Occupation: Actor
- Years active: 1984–1998
- Children: 1

Brandon Spencer Lee Call is an American former television and film actor. He played Hobie Buchannon in the first year of Baywatch and J.T. Lambert on Step by Step.

== Career ==
While still a child, Brandon Call began acting in 1984. His first roles were guest spots on Simon & Simon and Hotel. His film debut was voicing "Fairy #1" in Disney's The Black Cauldron in 1985. Also in 1985, he landed a recurring role on the NBC daytime drama, Santa Barbara. During his stint on Santa Barbara, he earned two Young Artist Awards for the role. After leaving the series in 1987, he guest-starred on two episodes of St. Elsewhere; he also co-starred with fellow soap opera veteran Christopher Rich on the short-lived series The Charmings. In 1989, Call was cast as Hobie Buchannon for the first season of NBC's Baywatch, which passed into syndication the following year. Call left the show to concentrate on his studies.

In 1990, Call returned to films with Blind Fury, in which he co-starred opposite Rutger Hauer. A year later, Call starred with Andrew Dice Clay in The Adventures of Ford Fairlane; he also appeared in For the Boys starring Bette Midler.

Before the close of 1991, Call was cast as John Thomas "J.T." Lambert on the ABC sitcom Step by Step, which moved to CBS in 1997 for its final season, after which Call retired from acting.

== Shooting ==
After taping an episode of Step by Step on September 3, 1996, Call got into a traffic dispute while driving home. He was shot in both arms by Tommy Eugene Lewis. Call was treated at the UCLA Medical Center and made a full recovery. Lewis was convicted of attempted murder and sentenced to life in prison with possibility of parole.

== Filmography ==
=== Film ===
- 1985: The Black Cauldron – Fairfolk (Voice)
- 1985: Jagged Edge – David Barnes
- 1989: Blind Fury – Billy Devereaux
- 1989: Warlock – Unbaptized Boy
- 1990: The Adventures of Ford Fairlane – The Kid
- 1991: For the Boys – Danny Leonard (at 12)

=== Television ===
- 1984: Simon & Simon – Addie Becker's Son (1 episode)
- 1984: Hotel – Timmie (1 episode)
- 1985: Slickers (Television movie) – Scooter Clinton
- 1985: I Dream of Jeannie... Fifteen Years Later (Television movie) – Tony Nelson Jr. (Age 7)
- 1985–1987: Santa Barbara – Brandon Capwell
- 1985–1988: Magnum, P.I. – Billy (3 episodes)
- 1986: The Richest Cat in the World (Television movie) – Bart
- 1986: Life with Lucy – Max (2 episodes)
- 1987–1989: St. Elsewhere – Christopher McFadden (2 episodes)
- 1987: Webster – Ricky Johnson (1 episode)
- 1987: Trying Times – Reggie (1 episode)
- 1987–1988: The Charmings – Thomas Charming (19 episodes)
- 1988: Something Is Out There – Joey (2 episodes)
- 1989: The Gifted One (Television movie) – Michael Grant (age 10)
- 1989–1990: Baywatch – Hobie Buchannon (22 episodes)
- 1991–1998: Step by Step – John Thomas "J.T." Lambert
- 1994: Thunder in Paradise – Zach (2 episodes)

== Awards and nominations ==
Year	Award	Result	Category	Film or series
1986	Young Artist Award	Won	Outstanding Young Actor - Regular Daytime Serial	Santa Barbara
1987	Young Artist Award	Nominated	Exceptional Performance by a Young Actor, Supporting Role, Feature Film - Comedy, Fantasy or Drama	Jagged Edge
1987	Young Artist Award	Won	Exceptional Performance by a Young Actor in a Daytime Series	Santa Barbara
1988	Young Artist Award	Nominated	Exceptional Performance by a Young Actor in a Television Comedy Series	The Charmings
1990	Young Artist Award	Nominated	Best Young Actor Supporting Role in a Television Series	Baywatch
1992	Young Artist Award	Nominated	Best Young Actor Starring in a New Television Series	Step by Step
1993	Young Artist Award	Nominated	Outstanding Young Comedian in a Television Series	Step by Step
1994	Young Artist Award	Nominated	Outstanding Youth Ensemble in a Television Series	Step by Step (Shared with Josh Byrne, Christopher Castile, Staci Keanan, Christine Lakin and Angela Watson)
