= CBS Block Party =

Comedy programming block on the CBS television network

CBS Block Party (referred to on-air as the CBS Friday Night Block Party) was a programming block that aired on the CBS television network during the 1997–1998 television season. The block was similar to, and was intended as direct competition to, ABC's TGIF lineup and aired on Friday nights from 8:00 p.m. to 10:00 p.m. ET, and included two former stalwarts of the TGIF lineup. Although the block was canceled after one year, the resulting audience fracture caused what turned out to be irreparable harm to the previously dominant TGIF, eventually clearing the way for CBS to dominate the Friday night lineup beginning in the next decade.

== Background ==
When ABC (a network that was in the midst of an overhaul as The Walt Disney Company took over) canceled the long-running shows Family Matters and Step by Step, CBS picked them up, paying a $40 million sum to earn the rights to the shows, and made them the cornerstones of the new "Block Party." Two new family comedies were added. The first was a new production from Miller-Boyett Productions (the production company behind Family Matters and Step By Step among other TGIF series), Meego. Meego, in addition to being produced by TGIF alumni, also starred a TGIF alumnus: Bronson Pinchot, who previously starred as Balki Bartokomous in Perfect Strangers and as Jean-Luc Rieupeyroux in the sixth season of Step by Step (Pinchot even used a similar accent to the one he used for the Balki character); Meego also featured well-known contemporary child stars Michelle Trachtenberg and Jonathan Lipnicki. The second new series was The Gregory Hines Show, an eponymous sitcom featuring entertainer Gregory Hines; CBS head Leslie Moonves described the Hines show as being more mature and edgy than the other shows in the block, but still family-friendly enough that children could watch comfortably.

Jaleel White, who played Family Matters star character Steve Urkel, stated that the producers jumped at the opportunity to jump to CBS because ABC was already shifting the TGIF block toward a much more child- and teen-oriented image, moving away from the whole-family approach it had taken at the beginning of its run (White believed being paired with the likes of The Gregory Hines Show was a far better fit than shows such as Muppets Tonight and Aliens in the Family that had been appearing on TGIF at the time), and that they did not believe Disney would give Miller-Boyett as prominent of a role as they had held with ABC before Disney had bought it. CBS, still experiencing aftereffects from the loss of NFL rights and multiple key affiliates to Fox in 1994, saw the purchase as a golden opportunity to draw a younger demographic than it was drawing at the time.

The CBS Block Party was CBS's second and final attempt to compete with TGIF; in 1992, CBS attempted a similar block, albeit targeting an older demographic than either TGIF or the Block Party, that featured The Golden Palace (the continuation of the long-running NBC sitcom The Golden Girls), Designing Women, Major Dad, and Bob. Like the Block Party, this block also failed after one season, and by the end of 1993, all four series had been canceled.

== Lineup ==
- 8:00pm Family Matters
- 8:30pm Meego
  - Replaced midseason with Kids Say the Darndest Things
- 9:00pm The Gregory Hines Show
- 9:30pm Step by Step

(all times U.S. Eastern Time)

== Aftermath ==
None of the shows in the initial lineup lasted beyond that season. Meego lasted a mere six weeks, and The Gregory Hines Show was gone after fourteen. Though the two ABC series were picked up for full seasons, they suffered badly from the network jump, with both series hitting all-time lows in the Nielsen ratings (Family Matters was nevertheless modestly successful enough to beat the show that replaced it in the TGIF lineup, You Wish; the success was short-lived when You Wish was canceled). Family Matters also suffered due to extensive retooling: Steve Urkel was revamped to tone down his nerdiness, several characters were written out or reduced to guest appearances, and Jo Marie Payton left the show midseason after getting into an altercation with White that nearly turned into fisticuffs (her role as Harriette Winslow was recast with Judyann Elder playing her the rest of the season).

When the series were canceled, none were afforded a series finale. Kids Say the Darndest Things, however, would continue for two additional seasons, usually paired on Friday nights with a revival of Candid Camera. Kids Say... and Candid Camera would have more sustained success against TGIF, which eventually declined over the next two years until it ended in 2000.

CBS has mostly focused on dramatic programming in the time slot since the Block Party was canceled, a programming strategy that has been a relative success in the so-called "Friday night death slot."
