= The Break Up Notebook: The Lesbian Musical =

The Break Up Notebook is a musical with music and lyrics by Lori Scarlett and David Manning and a book by Patricia Cotter. Cotter also wrote the play the musical was based on.

The Break Up Notebook tells the story of Helen Hill, a thirty-three-year-old lesbian from Los Angeles. Having just been dumped, she begins dating again with the support of her gay friend Bob and her butch and femme gal pals Monica and Joanie.

== Original cast ==
- Helen Hill .... Heidi Godt
- Casey/Sheila .... Christine Lakin
- Bob/Helen's father .... Patrick Bristow
- Monica .... Melody Butiu
- Joanie .... Jacqueline Maloney
- Frances .... Whitney Allen
- New Yorker, Ensemble .... Lori Scarlett
- Two Stepper, Mystery Woman, Ensemble .... Kara Maguire
- Bad Perm, Ensemble, Ex-Girlfriend .... Jodi Dominick
- Mom, Mistress Tammi, Saleswoman, Ensemble .... Deb Snyder
- Club Patron, Ensemble .... Amy Reiss
- Ensemble Swing.... Lauren Stone

The Break Up Notebook premiered at Hudson Theatre in Santa Monica (December 10, 2005 - March 12, 2006) and was performed at the Diversionary Theatre in San Diego (July 17, 2007 - August 17, 2007). It was produced by Rose Marcario in association with the L.A. Gay and Lesbian Center.

== Awards ==
The Break Up Notebook was winner of the Ovation Award for best new musical, six Garland Awards, and the L.A. Drama Critics Award for Best Score. It was also one of the musicals the National Alliance for Musical Theatre chose to feature at their 2007 Festival of New Musicals.
