= List of Step by Step episodes =

The following is an episode list for the American television sitcom Step by Step. The series originally ran for six seasons on ABC from September 20, 1991 to August 15, 1997, then moving to CBS for its seventh and final season from September 19, 1997, to June 26, 1998. A total of 160 episodes were produced, spanning seven seasons.

== Series overview ==
Season	Episodes	Originally released		
Season	Episodes	First released	Last released	Network
1	22	September 20, 1991	April 24, 1992	ABC
2	24	September 18, 1992	May 21, 1993	ABC
3	23	September 24, 1993	May 20, 1994	ABC
4	24	September 23, 1994	May 19, 1995	ABC
5	24	September 22, 1995	May 17, 1996	ABC
6	24	March 7, 1997	August 15, 1997	ABC
7	19	September 19, 1997	June 26, 1998	CBS

== Episodes ==
=== Season 1 (1991–92) ===
No. overall	No. in season	Title	Directed by	Written by	Original release date	Prod. code	Viewers (millions)
1	1	"Pilot"	Richard Correll	William Bickley & Michael Warren	September 20, 1991	475049	24.6
We meet the Lamberts - divorced contractor Frank and his three children: slacker J.T., tomboy Alicia (aka Al), and carefree Brendan; and the Fosters - widowed beautician Carol and her children: feminist Dana, glamourpuss Karen, and brainy Mark; each living in their separate homes. Carol and Frank devise a plan to date and then get married, so the kids don't find out about them getting married in Jamaica. They plan a barbecue at the Fosters' home when Frank accidentally ends up blurting out that he and Carol are married. The Lamberts pack up everything and move into the Fosters' home. The two families try their best to deal with the uncomfortable situation, but can't get along. The next day, Al tells her dad that her stomach hurts; Frank thinks she's trying to avoid school, but Carol believes her and takes her to the doctor (Bruce Jarchow) -- a good thing, as her appendix was about to burst.
2	2	"The Dance"	Richard Correll	John B. Collins	September 27, 1991	447004	21.5
Steve Urkel crash-lands in the Foster-Lamberts' yard as they are picnicking. He turns out to be Mark's science-fair partner and computer pen pal who asked Steve's help for the science fair. After the science fair, he talks to Al, who has been dumped by a boy she likes. Frank had told Al that everyone gets dumped at some point, and to move on. Steve reinforces that point and convinces Al to ask him to the school dance, where she tells off her originally-planned date and learns to "Do the Urkel". This episode picks up where the Family Matters episode "Brain over Brawn" leaves off, with Steve's jet-pack sending him out of Chicago. Guest star: Jaleel White as Steve Urkel.
3	3	"Rules of the House"	Richard Correll	Alan Eisenstock & Larry Mintz	October 4, 1991	447001	20.8
Carol's household-management style drives the Lamberts crazy, particularly a rule about cashing in tickets to watch television, with a six-hour-a-week restriction. Frank and his children make their opinions clear about that and other rules Carol has devised, but Al decides her new stepmother might get the message when she threatens to move to Milwaukee to live with her grandmother.
4	4	"First Anniversary"	Richard Correll	Julia Newton	October 11, 1991	447003	21.6
Frank's nephew Cody moves in with the family. Cody's oddball ways infuriate Dana, which delights J.T., who offers Cody $20 to ask her out. When Dana finds out, she agrees to shun her pride and go out with him. Meanwhile, Al and Brendan try to trap Mark with baseball questions; and Frank has trouble with Carol because of their one-month anniversary. Note: This episode marks the first appearance of Sasha Mitchell as Cody Lambert.
5	5	"Frank & Son"	Richard Correll	Robert Griffard & Howard Adler	October 18, 1991	447002	21.0
J.T. goes to work for Frank's company, but things don't work out, and still in need of extra cash he turns to Carol. She makes him her "shampoo boy," which he enjoys since he gets to be around pretty girls. Meanwhile, Dana and Al each become frustrated with their school assignments: Dana needs to build a birdhouse for shop class, while Al needs to write a book report on Tom Sawyer. The two agree to switch assignments, but Brendan prods their consciences. Absent: Christopher Castile as Mark Foster.
6	6	"Pulling Together"	John Tracy	Ross Brown & Joe Fisch	October 25, 1991	447006	21.3
Frank and Carol decide to enter the newly-blended family into the "Port Washington Games," but the Lambert kids object since the Fosters aren't very athletic, and the Fosters find the games too barbaric. Eventually the Fosters decide to participate, but even with predictable results, they keep the Lamberts close, and Karen ties things up in the pie-eating contest because her competition cannot eat around her. Eventually, Cody provides the family some much-needed help in the final tug-of-war event, and the Fosters and the Lamberts emerge victorious! Note: Cody Lambert (Sasha Mitchell) becomes a full-time cast until the end of the first season.
7	7	"Yo-Yo's Wedding"	John Tracy	Meredith Siler	November 1, 1991	447005	20.0
When their marriage is declared illegal, Frank wants to marry at City Hall. Although she isn't thrilled with the idea, Carol goes, but must wait for Frank who shows up late and filthy from work. She tells him she doesn't want to marry him and storms off. They then decide to have a ceremony at their house on the day of Brendan's birthday party. The clown Carol hired cancels at the last minute and Frank hastily steps in, but he doesn't have time to change out of the costume before the ceremony because the reverend (Bryan O'Byrne) must rush to catch a flight. Meanwhile, Cody enjoys Yo-Yo the clown because he saw him several years ago.
8	8	"Just for Kicks"	Larry Mintz	Alan Eisenstock & Larry Mintz	November 8, 1991	447009	24.8
Dana and her friend Bernice (Ami Foster), go to a seedy nightclub to hear a folk singer perform. But they don't know what to do when some of the bar's regulars, including "Psycho" (Anthony Mangano), get a little too rough with them. Luckily Cody shows up and protects Dana until Frank (who had forbidden her to go) and Carol arrive. Frank and Cody proceed to beat up the thugs.
9	9	"Into the Woods"	Richard Correll	Ross Brown & Joe Fisch	November 15, 1991	447008	23.1
The Fosters and Lamberts go camping in the woods. The attempt at family bonding doesn't go well at first; Frank's truck goes into the lake, so the family must wait for the Ranger to make his weekly check. Eventually everyone gains an appreciation for each other. Meanwhile, Penny looks after the house after getting lists from Carol.
10	10	"Mixed Messages"	James O'Keefe	Seth Weisbond	November 22, 1991	447010	22.4
Carol buys an answering machine and instructs the kids to write down the messages since the machine erases them upon playback. Karen gets a call from a potential boyfriend, then neglects a call telling Frank to not show up for a remodeling assignment at work since they're demolishing the building instead. Frank doesn't get that message and barely escapes with his life, and arrives home very angry when he finds that his boss did leave a message. Upset, Carol grounds Karen. Meanwhile, Cody takes a job filling coin machines for children, but loses it for only supplying the machine with the good toys.
11	11	"A Day in the Life"	John Tracy	Robert Griffard & Howard Adler	November 29, 1991	447007	17.6
A crew from the TV series America Up Close does a documentary on the new Foster-Lambert blended family, but all they can capture is the usual stepsibling friction. While Frank and Carol struggle to salvage the documentary, Dana advises siblings and stepsiblings to put their hostilities aside until the crew finishes taping. They try to get along during a Monopoly game, but before long the paper money is flying. Meanwhile, Cody and Penny attempt to become superstars. Absent: Peggy Rea as Ivy Baker.
12	12	"The New Car"	John Tracy	Julia Newton	December 6, 1991	447011	21.7
Carol goes to buy a new car and Frank tries to work a deal with his "friend" the salesman, Mel Fensky (Steve Vinovich), but Carol just buys the one she wants, which an unlicensed J.T. promptly borrows for a date, during which it disappears and J.T. worries that it's been stolen. He asks Cody to help him find it, but Cody didn't know about the new car, so he brings back their old one. It turns out that Frank had seen J.T. driving it and had taken it to teach him a lesson. But Dana also gets into trouble for knowing J.T. would take it and not saying anything. Meanwhile, Penny has finally found a boyfriend.
13	13	"Getting Organized"	John Tracy	Robert Griffard & Howard Adler	December 13, 1991	447012	17.7
Frank reluctantly enlists Carol's help in organizing his messy office. Carol decides to transfer some of Frank's files to a computer database, which is fine until she accidentally erases the information on the computer. She failed to make a back-up copy, and what's worse, she told Frank to throw away the hard copies of his files. Frank and Carol scramble to retrieve the information from the dumpster before the garbagemen come. They find the files, but not in time. They are loaded into the back of the truck, and come home covered in Chinese food (a Chinese family had gotten rid of their trash right on top of Carol and Frank), and laughing. Meanwhile, J.T. and Cody become obsessed with UFOs, which annoys Dana and Karen. Eventually, the Foster sisters decide to play a trick on the gullible Lambert duo, but Cody and J.T. get the last laugh.
14	14	"Home Alone"	John Tracy	John B. Collins	January 3, 1992	447013	23.1
Frank and Carol leave for a lovers' retreat. Dana is in charge, with a "no guests allowed" rule in effect. However Dana says since she invited two friends over, everyone else (even Mark, whose only guest is Cody) can invite two friends each, and eventually it's a huge party. Frank throws out his back at the hotel (which turns out to be a dump), so they cut their trip short and head home, where they find the party going on and J.T. trapped in the chimney flue. Absent: Patrika Darbo as Penny Baker, Peggy Rea as Ivy Baker
15	15	"Drive, He Said"	Richard Correll	Joe Fisch	January 17, 1992	447014	20.7
Dana and Frank each take driving tests - hers to get her first license, his as a renewal condition after missing renewal by 1 day. Dana passes hers, but Frank flunks his and is unable to drive until he can pass another test. After Dana almost causes an accident on the road and suffers from "driver fear" because of it, Carol tries to reassure her. Meanwhile, Al learns to play the drums; and Cody makes Brendan an unusual ice-cream sandwich.
16	16	"Bully for Mark"	James O'Keefe	Story by : Diane Ayers & Susan Sebastian; Teleplay by : Julia Newton	February 7, 1992	447016	20.8
Al comes to Mark's rescue when a bully called Max (Erika Flores) forces him to do her homework. Meanwhile, school-newspaper editor Dana writes a negative article on J.T., but J.T. finds out and convinces one of the girls on the staff to replace it with an article that makes him sound good. Also, Cody buys a new perfume to make Dana fall for him.
17	17	"The Boys in the Band"	Richard Correll	Joe Fisch	February 14, 1992	447018	19.5
Al and some of her friends form a rock band, Chicks With Attitude, and hire J.T. as their manager. He gets them a gig at a bowling alley Frank has been renovating. But on the night of their debut, Al scrambles to find replacements for ill members, and Dana and Karen agree to fill in. This would not be the last time Dana, Karen, or Al would sing together, although J.T. and Cody (who dress in drag) would not remain part of the act. Meanwhile, Frank tries to catch a mouse.
18	18	"School Daze"	Richard Correll	Meredith Siler	February 21, 1992	447015	18.5
Embarrassed about leaving college four classes short of her degree, Carol goes back to school. She soon realizes that as well as a student, she's also a committed mother, wife, and beautician, and soon everyone's ready to be committed when Frank takes over the housework. Nobody can seem to remember to pick up Brendan either. All the kids decide to chip in so the house will be run smoothly while Carol realizes her dream. Also, Cody tries to scare Brendan and Mark with horror stories. Absent: Peggy Rea as Ivy Baker.
19	19	"Country Club"	John Tracy	Alan Eisenstock & Larry Mintz	February 28, 1992	447019	19.3
Carol is invited to a country club with the family. Frank is reluctant to go until developer John Patterson invites him to join his golf team for a tournament, with the promise of a job as contractor for a large office complex he's building. Trying to win the eye of Patterson's handsome teenage son Greg (David Lascher), Dana becomes frustrated with Frank's oafish ways and bluntly tells him how she feels. Meanwhile, Frank is instrumental in helping Patterson's team win the golf tournament. Later, Dana overhears Patterson talking to his friends saying that he had no intention of giving Frank the job; he was just using him to get him to help with the tournament. Dana defends Frank, and then blows off Greg Patterson, thinking he is just like his father. Greg later comes to Dana's house to apologize for his father, and to give Frank the trophy. Mark, Brendan, Al, Karen, and J.T. also have fun at the club.
20	20	"Daddy's Girl"	Richard Correll	Robert Griffard & Howard Adler	March 6, 1992	447017	21.4
Grandpa visits, bringing his younger fiancée (Sherry Hursey). Frank recognizes her as a stripper from a bachelor party he went to a year ago, but his father storms off when he breaks the news. Then they postpone the wedding when he finds out that she really was a stripper. Meanwhile, Dana makes J.T. run errands for her all week if he wants her to fix him up with her pretty friend (Tiffani-Amber Thiessen); and Cody celebrates his 19th birthday.
21	21	"He Wanted Wings"	John Tracy	Joe Fisch	March 27, 1992	447021	22.6
As Frank gets close to turning 40, Carol worries that he'll have a midlife crisis and run off with a younger girl. She asks him if he has unfulfilled dreams, and when he mentions he used to want to get his pilot's license, she gets him flying lessons. But his instructor (George Wyner) is going through a rough time, and almost crashes the plane in a suicide attempt with Frank and Carol onboard. Carol knocks him out and Frank must take control of the plane. When they land safely, she apologizes for trying to give him a midlife crisis when he didn't have one. Meanwhile, the girls fight over making Frank's cake, and Cody and J.T. try to install a showerhead for him.
22	22	"Beauty Contest"	John Tracy	Sally Lapiduss & Pamela Eells	April 24, 1992	447020	19.6
Carol and Karen enter a mother-daughter beauty contest. They are both improperly hit on by judges, and Karen learns that it is more important to have pride and self-worth than to win. Also, Cody tries to join Frank's hunt club but Al's pig eats the duck's head he makes from cheese. Note: This is the final appearance of Patrika Darbo and Peggy Rea in the series, although they also appear in a flashback episode.

=== Season 2 (1992–93) ===
No. overall	No. in season	Title	Directed by	Written by	Original release date	Prod. code	Viewers (millions)
23	1	"S.A.T. Blues"	Joel Zwick	Matt Ember	September 18, 1992	447901	20.2
When Dana goes to take her SATs, Cody joins her, explaining that each month he likes to try something new and this is this month's challenge. Dana does very well - 91st percentile - but Cody does better. Dana cannot accept this (especially after Cody earlier in the episode thought there was a McDonald's on Saturn) and insists that they both take it again. Dana improves her score, but Cody still beats her. She is infuriated, and Cody worries that with his impressive results, he'll be expected to become a brain surgeon. Cody and Dana later decide that their lives may take them on unexpected paths. Meanwhile, the other kids borrow Frank's clothes. Guest star: Kathy Kinney, famously known for playing Mimi Bobeck on The Drew Carey Show, appears as the S.A.T. proctor.
24	2	"To B or Not to Be"	Joel Zwick	Meredith Siler	September 25, 1992	447902	20.0
Carol convinces Frank to help J.T. study for his Shakespeare test. They try a tape but it still doesn't help a lot. When they realize it's all about sex and violence, they stay up all night studying and J.T. goes into the test with a good feeling, but he receives a bad grade. When Frank and Carol talk to his teacher (Pat Crawford Brown), they discover that she gave J.T. a bad grade because she thought he wouldn't know the material because he's a jock. Infuriated, Carol makes her sit down and regrade his test. He gets a B+. Meanwhile, Mark and Al don't appreciate their new subjects.
25	3	"Stuck on You"	Richard Correll	Robert Griffard & Howard Adler	October 2, 1992	447904	19.1
J.T. wants to date a girl (Devon Odessa) way out of his league and goes to Karen for help but she ruins his chances. When Al becomes friends with both a girl her age and the girl's dad, Frank feels like he's losing her. Cody and Frank join a human-fly competition.
26	4	"J.T.'s World"	Richard Correll	Julia Newton	October 9, 1992	447903	22.2
In a nod to Wayne's World, J.T. starts his own local public-access television show, J.T.'s World and hires Cody as his sidekick. He invites pretty classmate Lisa (Elizabeth Berkley) onto his show, but she falls for Cody instead. Also, Frank and Carol let differing answers on a compatibility test get to them.
27	5	"It's a Dog's Life"	John Tracy	Matt Ember	October 16, 1992	447905	20.5
Al and Brendan agree to take care of a neighbor's oversized St. Bernard for the weekend, but the job quickly becomes more than they can handle. They get further annoyed when they learn the neighbors have decided to move away and no longer want the dog; however, Carol is overjoyed because she has fallen in love with the dog. Eventually, Frank puts his foot down and tells Carol to take it to a kennel. Notes: Patrick Duffy's previous series is referenced. When Frank's doing a crossword puzzle, he can't figure out a Texas city with 6 letters. Carol tells him the answer; Dallas. Chris, the St. Bernard who portrays Mr. Fritz, is the same canine actor who portrays Beethoven in the theatrical films Beethoven and Beethoven's 2nd. Christopher Castile (Mark) co-starred in both films as one of Beethoven's caretakers, Ted Newton, although he is portrayed in this episode as being afraid of Mr. Fritz.
28	6	"The Boss"	James O'Keefe	Robert Griffard & Howard Adler	October 23, 1992	447908	18.7
Dana learns a humbling lesson about being the boss and overseeing a group of employees when she is given a managerial job at a 1950s-style restaurant owned by Mr. Passarelli (Al Molinaro). She was too bossy and controlling, so Karen and J.T. quit, as did the two cooks, who only wanted the job so they could see Karen. Frank and Carol take over their jobs and challenge Dana's condescending demeanor. Also, Mark invents a lie-detector machine. Note: Carol told Frank the restaurant reminded her of the 1973 movie American Graffiti directed by George Lucas. Frank added that he was still looking for the blonde in the T-bird, who was actually portrayed by Suzanne Somers herself.
29	7	"Model Daughter"	Richard Correll	Chuck Tately	October 30, 1992	447906	19.6
A modeling job in Chicago may be Karen's dream come true — and the worst possible news for overbearing mother Carol, who tags along and meddles at every turn. Karen makes many new friends, but her job is cut short when another model, Cindy (Paula Trickey) advises her to stay in school and enjoy being a teen, as she had forfeited that life by going into modeling as a teen. At home, Dana comes down with the flu, followed by the other kids, and they make Frank their butler. Note: Oliver Muirhead photographer makes his first of 3 appearances, each time as a different character.
30	8	"Someone to Watch Over Me"	Jeffrey Ganz	Bob Rosenfarb	November 6, 1992	447909	21.6
Frank suspects that Dana's new boyfriend Mike Walters (Michael Landes) is out for nothing more than sex. Despite his misgivings, he allows Dana to go out with "Mike the Mover", but he gets Cody to drive him to Make-Out Point (where the two have gone to enjoy the moonlight and kiss). Frank rejects Cody's ridiculous idea to dress in a beaver costume to spy on them, instead climbing a tree to get a closer look, but the branch breaks under his weight and he literally drops in on them. Dana is embarrassed, but when Mike shows up the next day and tries to get her to go upstairs with him, she is infuriated and immediately kicks him out. Also, J.T. asks Brendan to wax Frank's truck.
31	9	"The Making of the President"	Richard Correll	Ernest Banks	November 13, 1992	447907	20.7
Annoyed that only dorks and geeks — in particular, Dana — are running for class president, J.T. announces that he will run. The campaign divides the Foster-Lambert home, then J.T., having run on a campaign that suggests that regular students' needs aren't met, actually wins. Eventually he wilts under the pressure and, having a new appreciation for the responsibilities that being class president brings, decides to turn over responsibilities to Dana. Meanwhile, Brendan tries to do magic. Note: John Mallory (Gary Wallace from the Weird Science TV series) appears as a student in this episode.
32	10	"Virgin Territory"	Judy Pioli	Julia Newton	November 20, 1992	447910	21.9
J.T. and Cody get dates with two girls who have "easy" reputations. The girls invite them back to their house, but Cody leaves - he wants to hold on to his virginity until he meets the right girl. This upsets both girls and J.T., although he eventually realizes that Cody is right. Meanwhile, Frank gets put on a low-cholesterol diet.
33	11	"Back to Basics"	Judy Pioli	Joe Fisch	December 4, 1992	447911	18.0
When a long-overdue video is found under Brendan's bed, Carol imposes a severe crackdown on family spending, and when the kids refuse to cooperate, she takes everything away. Brendan's siblings blame him unfairly, and when their alternating silent treatment and verbal abuse become too much, he decides to run away — to Cody's van. Cody eventually exposes Brendan's whereabouts, and Frank and Carol help their youngest realize that he wasn't to blame for anything.
34	12	"Boys Will Be Boys"	Patrick Duffy	Matt Ember	December 11, 1992	447913	19.7
Frank's old high school friend Scooter (Philip Charles MacKenzie), who still hasn't grown up nearly 25 years later, visits and keeps Frank out until 3 AM and takes 16-year-old J.T. to the Boom-Boom Room. Meanwhile, Cody wins a turkey in a supermarket raffle which is delivered alive (Ron Karabatsos appears as the deliveryman), and deals with his conscience when he is asked to have it butchered. Note: This episode marks Patrick Duffy's Step by Step directorial debut.
35	13	"If I Were a Rich Man"	Richard Correll	Julia Newton	January 8, 1993	447917	21.0
Cody learns that Walter, a friend from the local nursing home, has died and left him $250,000. When the Lambert and Foster kids pester him for a share of the inheritance (to spend extravagantly), Cody decides to give all but $500 of it to the nursing home. Cody spends the $500 on a new video camera for the family after the cheap one Frank purchased breaks down in spectacular fashion.
36	14	"Happy Birthday, Baby"	Judy Pioli	Meredith Siler	January 15, 1993	447912	23.9
Dana wants to celebrate her 17th birthday with a no-adults-allowed bash. When Frank and Carol say no, Dana decides to rent a hotel room with the help of her friend Traci to have a party. It turns out Frank and Carol decide to spend a romantic weekend in the same hotel — in a room directly across from Dana's suite. This naturally leads to conflicts, however everything works out when Carol realizes Dana is growing up. Also, Karen and Al get into a huge fight when Al screws up trying to wash Karen's blouse for a big date. In a parody of The People's Court, Judge Cody listens to the evidence ... and determines everything worked out well, as Karen's date loved the new look of the blouse.
37	15	"One of the Guys"	Mark Linn-Baker	Richard P. Halke	January 22, 1993	447916	22.5
Frank is looking for a replacement on his contracting crew and may have to hire a woman, which he does. Frank then has a job where he and Aggie get snowed in at a hotel. Carol proceeds to drive thru the blizzard to confront Frank about what she thinks is going on. Meanwhile, Mark, J.T., Karen, Al and Brendan play the stock market after getting Cody's help, or so they think. Note: This is the first of three episodes in the series in which Melanie Wilson guest starred in. In this episode she plays the character of Aggie.
38	16	"No Business Like Show Business"	Richard Correll	Matt Ember	February 5, 1993	447920	21.6
J.T.'s World becomes a huge local hit, drawing the attention of a national television syndicator. J.T., sensing a huge windfall about to come his way, agrees to go along with the new producer's (David Graf) suggestions (including firing his siblings), and begins neglecting his schoolwork and speaking freely to his parents. In the end, J.T.'s dreams of success are ruined when the producers hire actors to play both J.T. and sidekick Cody. A humbled J.T. starts focusing on his school work, and apologizes to his dad. Also, Frank and Carol begin an art class together, after the two of them realize they don't have time for each other because they are both really busy. The class turns out to be drawing a nude model of a man which annoys Frank.
39	17	"Love, Port Washington Style"	Richard Correll	Scott Spencer Gordon	February 12, 1993	447918	22.1
In a foul mood when her boyfriend dumps her right before Valentine's Day, Dana works a double shift at the '50's Café and meets a guy who's her spitting image. Meanwhile J.T. tries to impress a girl (Kelly Packard) with Cody's help, and Carol recruits Frank to be a hair stylist during a busy stretch.
40	18	"Aloha (Part 1)"	Richard Correll	Robert Griffard & Howard Adler	February 19, 1993	447914	23.4
The Lamberts and Fosters win a trip to Hawaii, including Cody (who invites himself along by paying his own way). Carol wants to go on a whirlwind tour of the islands; Al, Brendan, and Mark enter a sandcastle-building contest; and Cody searches for buried treasure; J.T. chases after a pretty Hawaiian girl; and Dana meets the man (Josh Hoffman) of her dreams, who presents her with a 6-carat (1,200 mg) solitaire in a Tiffany setting.
41	19	"Aloha (Part 2)"	Richard Correll	Robert Griffard & Howard Adler	February 26, 1993	447915	23.2
Dana considers eloping with her rich boyfriend (Josh Hoffman) from Hawaii when Carol objects to her plan to marry. They get into a huge quarrel, where it is brought out that Carol married when she was just 17 and that quickie romances rarely work out in the end, and Dana reminds her mother that she married Frank and that they are still together. In the end, Dana realizes that they aren't right for each other because she is only 17 and still has a lot she wants to do, and they sadly part. After J.T. can't find the Hawaiian girl he is looking for, he decides to help Cody discover the real treasure (which in part was tied to a pretty Hawaiian girl J.T. was trying to pursue), while Al, Brendan, and Mark win a helicopter tour of Hawaii, the result of their victory in the sandcastle-building contest.
42	20	"No Way to Treat a Lady"	Richard Correll	Bob Rosenfarb	March 12, 1993	447919	22.4
J.T. enlists Mark for advice on how to treat his new girlfriend, a brash biker babe. Meanwhile, Carol takes 13-year-old Al shopping for her first bra, but Frank shows up uninvited and embarrasses his daughter.
43	21	"The Un-Natural"	Patrick Duffy	Bob Rosenfarb	April 2, 1993	447923	20.3
Just when Al's Pony League baseball team reaches the championship game, one of the players suffers a tragic season-ending injury. Coach Frank is forced to ask Mark — who is "not even good enough to be bad" — to join the team, and considers sitting him until the game is decided. However, the game is tight all the way and comes down to the final out. Out of substitutions, Frank must allow Mark an at-bat. Mark is very nervous, and the crowd is furious that Frank put in Mark. He wants to go back to the bench, but Al threatens him with bodily harm if he doesn't go back to the bat. He gets two strikes, but he ends up hitting a game-winning homerun! Also, Cody and J.T. bet that they can stay awake longer than Karen and Dana.
44	22	"The Psychic"	Joel Zwick	Julia Newton	April 30, 1993	447924	19.6
J.T. publishes an unflattering baby photo of Karen in the high-school yearbook. Hell hath no fury like a Foster scorned, and she takes full advantage of J.T.'s worry that a brunette will stab him to death at the stroke of midnight. J.T. hadn't believed the news when the psychic warned him, but Cody reinforces it by pointing out that everything the psychic said would happen before he died is happening. Meanwhile, Frank and Carol's new massaging bed provides them anything but a good night's sleep. Absent: Staci Keanan as Dana Foster
45	23	"This Old House"	Richard Correll	Robert Griffard & Howard Adler	May 7, 1993	447922	17.1
When Frank gets a job building a new multi-million-dollar office complex, he must hire someone to demolish the old buildings and Carol wants him to hire Cody for the job. Then Cody realizes he can't complete the assignment because the homeowners - unemployed parents of two children, who are unable to afford new housing or obtain new jobs fast enough — are still living inside. Frank is further thrown into a dilemma when Carol joins Cody in protesting the home's demolition ... and the financer (Bruce Jarchow) of the office project threatens to sue Frank for breach of contract if the house demolition is not completed by the deadline. Also, J.T becomes Al, Brendan, and Mark's manager and forces them to lick envelopes.
46	24	"Double Date"	Richard Correll	Meredith Siler	May 21, 1993	447921	17.3
Carol sets up Karen with Freddie, who is new to town and also just (a 142) on Karen's grading scale. Karen prefers a jock named Jeffrey and accepts a date with him, and Carol catches her dumping Freddie by lying to him over the phone. She sneaks out to go with Jeff and they win Perfect Couple ... right after Freddie confronts Karen. She refuses the award and finishes the evening with Freddie. Meanwhile, Carol does not like the way Frank organizes his money and tries unsuccessfully to make him use a male purse. When a stereo is stolen out of Cody's van, Lucille, Frank concentrates his efforts into putting an alarm in it, but it's so good that Frank gets stuck in the van while demonstrating it.

=== Season 3 (1993–94) ===
No. overall	No. in season	Title	Directed by	Written by	Original release date	Prod. code	Viewers (millions)
47	1	"Way-Off Broadway"	Richard Correll	Bob Rosenfarb	September 24, 1993	455453	16.9
Dana really likes the director (Shawn Levy) of a local play so she decides to sign up. As fate would have it, Cody knows him, so Cody and Dana are cast as Romeo and Juliet in the play. Also, Frank believes he has lost his wedding ring while playing golf after telling Carol he wouldn't play for a while because of his bad back.
48	2	"The Apartment"	Richard Correll	Julia Newton	October 1, 1993	455451	20.2
Dana moves into an apartment down the street to gain independence, but soon realizes she misses the family, even J.T. Meanwhile Frank has accepted a construction client's payment in kind: the TV of his choice, to put in the parents' bedroom, but Carol makes him promise to throw it out as soon as watching sports gets in the way of their love life.
49	3	"Never on Sunday"	Richard Correll	Brian Bird & John Wierick	October 8, 1993	455452	20.2
Carol invites the new pastor and his wife for lunch after church one Sunday. Frank worries because he feels like he is being watched by an informant to God. He nervously promises the pastor that he'll go to church the next Sunday; the Lambert children are upset because a big Packers game will be on! Frank drags them all to church, but J.T. sneaks up to the attic to watch the game with the pastor's son Michael (Eric Balfour) after the sermon starts. When Al and Brendan attempt to follow J.T.'s lead, Frank goes upstairs to find his son. Frank gets into the game and ends up falling through the old floorboards, landing right behind the pastor. Cody and his friends Slasher (Donald Gibb) and Death attend church as well. Note: Donald Gibb, Ogre from Revenge of the Nerds movies, makes the first of his six appearances, four as Slasher and two as Moose.
50	4	"Paper Chase"	Richard Correll	Richard P. Halke	October 15, 1993	455454	20.4
J.T. sells essays to the football team, Dana finds out and tells Mark, and the two have an idea. Also, Cody cares for Slasher's (Donald Gibb) son, which makes Carol want to have another child. Note: This episode marks the first appearance of Jason Marsden, who would later become a regular in the series as J.T.'s best friend, and later Dana's boyfriend, Rich. In this episode, he plays a character named Doug.
51	5	"Trading Places"	Patrick Duffy	Meredith Siler	October 22, 1993	455455	18.7
It's the old "Whose job is easier?" game, played Foster-v.-Lambert style. This time, parents Frank and Carol swap roles with J.T. and Dana when the comment is made that parenting is easier than being a teenager. Also, Cody looks for true love by placing an ad in a biker magazine.
52	6	"Video Mania"	Richard Correll	Howard Adler & Robert Griffard	October 29, 1993	455456	20.0
Mark starts playing video games to relieve stress from receiving an A instead of an A+ on a test, but he soon becomes addicted, his whole attitude changes, and he's eventually sent to a support group. Dana is annoyed at Cody's way of relieving his cold; and Karen tries to hide something from Carol.
53	7	"Hog Wild"	James O'Keefe	Julia Newton	November 5, 1993	455457	20.9
Frank and Carol go crazy searching for anniversary gifts. J.T creates a motorcycle enterprise for Cody who tries to get a loan from the bank's loan officer (Michael Milhoan), unsuccessfully until one of his biker pals helps out, but Cody doesn't like what J.T. has changed.
54	8	"Down and Out in Port Washington"	Patrick Duffy	Maria A. Brown	November 12, 1993	455458	21.0
When Cody's van, Lucille, which doubles as his home and mode of transport, breaks down and needs major repairs, he moves into the house and drives everyone crazy, hanging laundry in the kitchen, and then his ant farm is a problem when the ants get loose. When Cody learns that his van is beyond repair, Carol, thinking he'll become a permanent house guest, threatens to move out. Eventually Cody decides to keep living in Lucille even if he can't drive her. Meanwhile, Karen falls in love with one of Dana's coworkers and learns 1. he has a girlfriend; 2. she (Karen) might be shallow.
55	9	"The Marrying Dude"	Richard Correll	Howard Adler & Robert Griffard	November 19, 1993	455460	23.9
Cody meets a blind date through a biker magazine dating advertisement: Bonnie (Jensen Daggett), is a single mother looking for the perfect father for her 8-year-old son Riley. When Cody and Riley hit it off, Bonnie sees that Cody is the right man and asks if they can get married. Cody at first accepts, but then realizes things are moving too fast. Cody and Bonnie decide that they should take things slow and see what happens, instead of rushing into marriage. Al is concerned about not getting asked out because of her small breasts. Also Frank and Carol want to redecorate the living room.
56	10	"Sister Act"	Patrick Duffy	R.J. Colleary	November 26, 1993	455461	16.8
Karen desires to date a 21-year-old man named Michael (Sean Kanan) and enlists Dana to help set up the date, but it's Dana who hooks up with Michael. Later, Dana is on the phone with a friend, unaware that J.T. is secretly taping the conversation, in which she reaffirms that Michael isn't Karen's boyfriend. Not wanting to cause trouble between the normally-close Karen and Dana, J.T. plays the phone conversation to Karen, who angrily tells Michael that Dana is only 14; at The 50s Diner, Michael breaks up with Dana, citing their "age difference." That night, Karen accuses Dana of stealing her boyfriend, but the argument quickly dies out when Karen admits she is jealous of Dana's virtues, and the two make up. Also, after not dancing with Carol at a wedding, Franks learns how to dance, thanks to Cody.
57	11	"Christmas Story"	Patrick Duffy	Brian Bird & John Wierick	December 10, 1993	455463	19.3
Frank and Carol wind up in jail on Christmas Eve when they are caught inside a toy store by a know-it-all deputy sheriff (Don Knotts). Frank had recently remodeled the store and was given a discount on the store's merchandise. They had gone there after hours because he and Carol had forgot to purchase a train set for Brendan and stocking-stuffers for the kids. Meanwhile, the kids do not know that their parents are in jail, and rip through all of their presents. Cody sets them straight, and when they learn that Frank and Carol are in jail, they all go down there to celebrate Christmas with them. Also Cody gets ready for a Christmas-decoration contest. Note: Don Knotts' character and actions are a direct reference and link to his character on The Andy Griffith Show. He and Suzanne Somers co-starred on Three's Company.
58	12	"Close Encounters of the Marital Kind"	Richard Correll	Bob Rosenfarb	December 17, 1993	455459	18.3
Frank's hesitant after Carol purchases a marriage-improvement book; Carol has a secret she has been keeping from Frank and she finds out Frank has one too. Now that they're all drivers, Dana, J.T., and Karen ask Frank and Carol to buy them a car, and when they don't, the young drivers scrounge up money to buy an old Volkswagen Bug which is so dangerous that they must sell it for parts to get the money back. Meanwhile, the guys from Frank's company find something meant only for Frank. Note: The song playing on the eight-track player Cody salvages from J.T.'s car is "I Got You Babe", which becomes Dana and Rich's song when they become a couple later in the series.
59	13	"Bad Girls"	Richard Correll	Maria A. Brown	January 7, 1994	455462	25.3
Al falls into a bad group of girls led by Jackie Campbell. They dress in military fatigues, skip school, and stay out late at night, among other things. Al's new attitude angers Frank and the two get into a huge argument. But what hurts Al even more is losing Cody's trust when she tries to take his guitar without permission. Al finally realizes she needs to be herself and take her time in choosing friends (and wisely, at that). Also, Carol tries to make family time when the TV is broken.
60	14	"Read All About It"	Richard Correll	Howard Adler & Robert Griffard	January 14, 1994	455465	24.9
When Frank learns that Carol makes more money than he does, he gets a job at a chicken restaurant, passing out flyers while dressed as a chicken. Cody gets a temporary job as a storyteller in the children's section of the public library. He learns that Brendan's friend Ryan (Phillip Van Dyke) can't read, so he teaches him to read for the next storytime session.
61	15	"Thirteen With a Bullet"	Patrick Duffy	Patrick Duffy & Bob Rosenfarb	January 28, 1994	455466	21.7
Mark, who is celebrating his 13th birthday, develops a huge crush on a pretty classmate Marissa (Marla Sokoloff), he dances with her, gets his first kiss during a game of spin-the-bottle, and sends her flowers...and she rejects him. Also, J.T obtains an excellent grade in his mechanics exam and forces Dana to repair a car in order to prove to her that he can beat her at manual work.
62	16	"My Bodyguard"	Patrick Duffy	Meredith Siler	February 4, 1994	455468	20.8
Cody annoys the family with his recollections of weird dreams. First, he pictures Al "behind bars" and "wearing a striped shirt," but she's just wearing a striped soccer jersey and showing off her hamster cage. After he annoys Dana by telling her about a dream in which a man in suit attacks her, he tags along on her college interview in Chicago and assaults the Dean of Admissions (Brian George), thinking him to be Dana's assailant (he was embracing her as they were leaning out the window to look at the Chicago skyline). Dana angrily tells Cody she wants nothing more to do with him; however, Cody can't shake his seemingly-ridiculous bad vibes. That night at a bus station, a man (Michael Bryan French) in a suit corners Dana after she declines to go out with him, and Cody runs him off before he can do anything. Dana breaks down in Cody's arms and thanks him. Also, Frank and the kids are concerned about Carol's snoring problem which keeps them up all night so Frank comes up with a solution.
63	17	"Pretty Woman"	William Bickley	Richard P. Halke	February 18, 1994	455467	19.3
Karen loses out on a coveted modeling job for a jeans advertising campaign, but her disappointment is nothing compared to learning who does get the job: Al, whom the nationally-renowned photographer says has the look they were searching for. A vengeful Karen bitterly tries to upstage her stepsister by destroying her self-assurance, but in the end realizes that Al deserves support. Meanwhile, Cody struggles with his good-luck "curse". He also shows Dana, Brendan, and J.T. the true value of karate.
64	18	"Nightmare Weekend"	Patrick Duffy	Maria A. Brown	February 25, 1994	455469	14.8
After Mark ruins a scary movie for J.T., Brendan, and Al, they decide to scare him, but in the end everyone - except one - of the kids is sent screaming. Frank takes Carol out to a cabin where he had brought an old girlfriend, and doesn't realize it until Carol tells him. When they arrive Frank tries to get another hotel but has no luck, and to make things worse, the bellman (Patrick Bristow) calls Frank by name and makes things worse the more he talks.
65	19	"Birth of a Salesman"	Patrick Duffy	Julia Newton	March 11, 1994	455464	19.2
Carol is worried when J.T. gets a job at a used-car lot, and says he'll do that rather than go to college. But when she comes to the lot and sees him in action and that the owner (Steve Vinovich) is very impressed with J.T., she concedes that maybe he's doing what's best for him after all. Dana uses Cody as a subject for an essay in her psychology class, he starts to talk about his first memories. Note: Nedra Volz makes an appearance as Mrs. Slezak.
66	20	"Feeling Forty"	Richard Correll	R.J. Colleary	March 25, 1994	445471	20.4
Carol is feeling every bit her age after shopping for a new dress and talking to the saleswoman as the big 4-0 approaches, so she decides to invest in diet pills, and she quickly becomes hooked on the amphetamines. Meanwhile, Cody tries helping Al with a research project about Abraham Lincoln (Larry Hankin). Instead of going to the library and looking up the information, Cody suggests consulting a psychic who supposedly has connections with the 16th president. When Al sees Cody talking with "Honest Abe" as though he were right there in the room, she realizes she needs to do the work herself.
67	21	"The Case of the Missing Diary"	Richard Correll	Howard Adler & Robert Griffard	April 29, 1994	455473	15.7
Cody gets some inspiration for a class writing project when Karen can't find her diary. He uses her plight to spin a 1940s-style detective yarn about who took it: Dana, Al, Carol, or one of the guys? Note: Somers' previous show is referenced; When Frank says "Three's a crowd", Carol says "I always thought Three's Company."
68	22	"Great Expectations"	Patrick Duffy	Brian Bird & John Wierick	May 6, 1994	455470	17.9
Cody's father (Edward Winter) pressures him into a job as executive vice-president of his real-estate company. On his first day he is typical Cody talking with Jackson (Beau Billingslea), one of his co-workers. With a little help from Frank, Cody tells his father he's simply not interested and would rather continue working in demolition. Meanwhile, Carol (as a favor for a customer) sets up Dana and Karen on blind dates, against their expressed wishes. The guys turn out to be living images of Beavis and Butt-Head. After Frank gets rid of them, he helps his stepdaughters set up a "get even" prank on Carol. Guest star: John Stamos makes a cameo. Absent: Josh Byrne as Brendan Lambert
69	23	"Prom Night"	Patrick Duffy	Julia Newton	May 20, 1994	455472	17.1
On prom night, J.T. is set up with a 13-year-old girl as a joke. Meanwhile, Dana's date with the school hunk also doesn't go well (he got back together with his ex-girlfriend), and Karen isn't going because she is dating a college guy. The two constantly-at-odds stepsiblings are left to share a dance... and gain grudging mutual respect and appreciation. Also, after Brendan fights with a classmate, Frank and Carol invite him and his parents (Nancy Lenehan and Troy Evans) over, only to discover that the son is like his parents after Frank catches them cheating at a board game.

=== Season 4 (1994–95) ===
No. overall	No. in season	Title	Directed by	Written by	Original release date	Prod. code	Viewers (millions)
70	1	"Karate Kid"	Richard Correll	Bob Rosenfarb	September 23, 1994	456352	20.3
Trying to improve his self-esteem, Mark enrolls in a karate class, but the jockish instructor keeps belittling him for his "wimpy" attitude. He wants to drop out, but Cody helps him stand up to Tommy, the "class pet" and star student. During a challenge match, Tommy quickly gains the upper hand, but Cody, who happens to be a black belt, helps Mark exploit Tommy's weakness and rally to force sudden death. Tommy wins the match, but Mark wins Tommy's respect. But the coach keeps taunting Mark - and then Cody. Cody tries to leave, but the instructor goes too far and Cody hastily subdues that loudmouthed coach. Meanwhile, Frank installs an intercom in the house.
71	2	"College Bound"	Richard Correll	Julia Newton	September 30, 1994	456351	19.7
Upset about not going to Harvard, Dana learns a hard lesson in humility when a tough English professor (Oliver Muirhead) at local fictitious East Wisconsin "Cheez Whiz" University gives her a D on her first term paper for using too many "big words" and not focusing enough on the paper's content. She complains to her teacher but gets no sympathy, then she must endure humiliation from her stepsiblings. She vows to improve her attitude ... then learns that Cody has enrolled at EWU. Meanwhile, J.T. is somehow able to obtain a credit card, then many more, and goes on a shopping spree, and Carol falls in love with one of his purchases.
72	3	"Animal House"	Patrick Duffy	Brian Bird & John Wierick	October 7, 1994	456355	17.0
Wanting to be cool, Cody decides to join a college fraternity, but he re-examines his desire to fit in when his frat brothers want to go too far with Karen at a party. Also, Brendan joins the school band, but his trumpet-playing skills are lacking.
73	4	"Spoiled Sport"	William Bickley	Howard Adler & Robert Griffard	October 14, 1994	456354	17.6
Frank auditions to become a part-time sports broadcaster for the local radio station, but Carol wins the job. Frank is disappointed, but soon realizes that he is a star in Carol's eyes. After Carol tells the kids to buy their own junk food if they want it, they refuse to share and start a food fight, even attacking Cody.
74	5	"Revenge of the Nerd"	Patrick Duffy	Bob Rosenfarb	October 21, 1994	456358	18.0
Karen is desperate to be voted homecoming queen. When she learns that the deciding vote is from a nerd named Irwin Bird, she tries to convince him to vote for her. He blackmails her into going out with him, but at the end of the night, she refuses to kiss him so he votes for Tiffany Rogers. Meanwhile, after being struck by lightning while trying to install an antenna on his van, Cody gets amnesia.
75	6	"Something Wild"	Richard Correll	Julia Newton	October 28, 1994	456357	19.9
On Halloween, Mark's crush, J.J. Jenkins (Michelle Williams), encourages him to dress as a punk rocker — and commit vandalism by throwing eggs at a house. Also, Garry (Bodhi Elfman) and Larry (Jason Behr, replacing Rob Moore), the guys similar to Beavis and Butt-Head who were set up to go out with Karen and Dana in "Great Expectations", attend the party, to the girls' dismay. Meanwhile, Cody wants to create the biggest Jack-O-Lantern in the world.
76	7	"Growing Up Is Hard to Do"	Richard Correll	Maria A. Brown	November 4, 1994	456353	19.9
Al sets up a date with class hunk Kevin Lewis (Will Estes), which doesn't turn out well. She goes to J.T. for advice first, but he wants nothing to do with her "sex life", so she turns to her stepsisters, who give her conflicting advice. Instead of just being herself, Al accepts Karen's advice to agree with everything Kevin says. Meanwhile, Carol thinks she's pregnant and tells Frank. Frank goes to check the pregnancy test and says it's negative. Dana then walks in to borrow some conditioner and finds the pregnancy test. She tells her mom that's she pregnant, Frank misread the test.
77	8	"Beyond Therapy"	Richard Correll	Meredith Siler	November 11, 1994	456356	20.6
Carol has the Fosters and Lamberts visit a psychiatrist (Jerry Stroka), for each to discuss his/her feelings about the new baby; after the session, Carol asks the kids for 24 fight-free hours. Meanwhile, Cody thinks he is turning into a werewolf.
78	9	"The Ice Cream Man Cometh"	Patrick Duffy	Howard Adler & Robert Griffard	November 18, 1994	456360	20.7
Cody's friend (John Astin) wants to commit suicide after his wife Marge dies; he leaves Cody a note and heads off to jump out of a plane so Cody chases after him. Meanwhile, the kids fuss about the baby's room, and Frank and Carol make a final decision that they don't like.
79	10	"Letting Go"	Patrick Duffy	Larry Kase & Joel Ronkin	November 25, 1994	456361	16.9
Cody brings Dana home from school because she is sneezing all the time. Mark realizes that she only sneezes around Cody, so they think she's allergic to him. Very upset, Cody wants to leave and even starts to pack up his van, but Dana begs him to stay, and finally discovers she's just allergic to his shampoo. Also, Frank thinks Al's new boyfriend Zack (Michael Sullivan) is a "freak" until they get better acquainted. Absent: Josh Byrne as Brendan Lambert
80	11	"Make Room for Daddy"	John Tracy	Maria A. Brown	December 9, 1994	456359	17.3
Frank takes Carol away for a romantic weekend where he tells Carol he feels like he lost his best friend in her, while Karen, Al and Dana have a girls' night talking about guys. Meanwhile, Mark dates a genius; at first he's disappointed, but as the night goes on he likes her more and more. Absent: Josh Byrne as Brendan Lambert
81	12	"I'll Be Home For Christmas"	Joel Zwick	Brian Bird & John Wierick	December 16, 1994	456362	17.3
J.T. decides he has grown out of celebrating Christmas with the family and decides to go skiing with his friends. He eventually misses Frank when he realises that his friends have no Christmas spirit. Carol's Aunt Edna (Doris Roberts) visits, but she is actually very angry and grumpy. Mark misses his girlfriend. Note: Garry and Larry (Bodhi Elfman & Rob Moore), the two living images of Beavis and Butt-head from the episodes "Great Expectations" and "Something Wild", re-appear in this episode
82	13	"Can't Buy Me Love"	Patrick Duffy	Julia Newton	January 6, 1995	456364	21.5
While borrowing his boss's luxury car, J.T. meets a pretty girl named Shelly (Rebecca Herbst) at her father's diner and decides to impress her by claiming the car is his. Also, Frank and Carol go to the gynecologist (Francesca P. Roberts). Note: This is the first of two episodes in the series entitled "Can't Buy Me Love". The second episode with this title is from season 7.
83	14	"Thirtysomething"	William Bickley	R.J. Colleary	January 20, 1995	456363	22.3
Pregnant Carol binges on odd food combinations; Cody makes a film about a goldfish for his filmmaking class; Dana comes to terms with her much-older boyfriend Paul (John Clough) after meeting his friends including someone she knows from college, and that's not the only surprise Paul has.
84	15	"The Honeymoon Is Over"	Patrick Duffy	Maria A. Brown	February 3, 1995	456366	19.6
When Mark's girlfriend Gabrielle stays for the weekend, Mark takes advice from J.T. as Gabrielle tries to make Mark eat more vegetables, and dress a certain way, and a battle of the sexes fight breaks out, Frank doesn't like his birthday present from Carol: red French-cut bikini briefs.
85	16	"One Truck, Al Dente"	Richard Correll	Howard Adler & Robert Griffard	February 10, 1995	456367	18.9
Al pressures J.T. to teach her how to drive and they borrow Frank's new truck for the lesson, but Al is involved in a minor accident. They try to plaster the truck's side to cover up their activities, but Frank soon learns that the truck was damaged. Dana gets loopy on painkillers after the removal of her wisdom teeth and annoys Cody by eating his ice cream, singing blues with his guitar, and dancing the limbo. Also, Frank and Carol take a prenatal class. Note: This is the first episode where the family's garage is shown.
86	17	"Head of the Class"	John Tracy	Bob Rosenfarb	February 17, 1995	456365	17.9
Cody and Dana have conflicting teaching styles when they are recruited to teach a remedial history class. Their unlikely efforts result in their students upsetting a team of academic intellectuals on a TV quiz bowl. Also, Carol makes everybody crazy with her obsessions, worrying Brendan so that he does housework at night. Note: Two of the students are played by Seth Green and Walter Emanuel Jones
87	18	"Back to School"	Richard Correll	Meredith Siler	March 3, 1995	456368	19.5
J.T. realizes he needs a college education to land a decent-paying job. After struggling on an early test, his academics soon overwhelm him, but it is a tipoff that he may have dyslexia. Meanwhile, Carol - and Frank, to a much lesser degree - invite the administrators of an upper-class preschool over to try to get the Lamberts' unborn child pre-enrolled; however, the selectors obnoxiously sneer at the Lamberts' lifestyle.
88	19	"She Came in Through the Bedroom Window"	William Bickley	Brian Bird & John Wierick	March 17, 1995	456370	19.9
When Cody's professor becomes fed up with his constant use of the word "dude", he agrees to be shocked every time he says the word. Dana agrees to deliver the shock therapy... and takes full advantage of this. Meanwhile, a very pregnant Carol is so insecure about her appearance that when Frank starts working with his very attractive ex-girlfriend Pam (Susan Blakely), she spies on them. Note: Frank makes a joke about going on a date with Victoria Principal. Principal played as Patrick Duffy's wife Pam Ewing on CBS primetime soap opera Dallas.
89	20	"Indecent Proposal"	Richard Correll	Bob Rosenfarb	March 31, 1995	456371	19.6
J.T. gets a higher grade than Dana on an ethics-class assignment, then Dana learns why: Heather Flynn, his teacher, has the hots for him. When Dana tries to tell him about the teacher's motives he decides to go to her apartment anyway. There she makes a move on him but J.T. realizes Dana was right, and leaves. Also, Cody annoys the family with his sleepwalking; and Frank buys a Meat Master 5000 and puts it together himself... and it explodes.
90	21	"Where Have You Gone, Joe DiMaggio?"	Richard Correll	Julia Newton	April 28, 1995	456373	17.0
Cody takes Brendan to a baseball game featuring his favorite player, Kenny Barton. After the game, Cody distracts the security guard (Tommy Lister) so Brendan can meet his hero and ask him to autograph his baseball; however, Barton is rude to Brendan and demands $50 for an autograph. After consoling Brendan, Cody confronts Barton during a TV interview and exposes his demeanor. The interviewer, Hall of Fame player and broadcaster Harmon Killebrew, is equally outraged and offers to sign Brendan's baseball at no charge; Brendan gladly accepts the offer. Also: Carol and Dana make a bet with Frank and J.T. that they can't handle how pregnancy feels for one weekend, so they wear pregnancy suits! Note: There is an overt reference to Suzanne Somers' previous series Three's Company: in the scene, Carol is in the living room watching Three's Company, and remarks how she likes Chrissy.
91	22	"Adventures in Babysitting"	Patrick Duffy	Maria A. Brown	May 5, 1995	456372	16.9
To help Al earn money to go on a trip with her friends, J.T. suggests helping her run a babysitting service. They soon learn there's no such thing as easy money (as Frank had warned them) when they're overwhelmed by the horde of kids they must babysit. Also, Carol tries to help Karen find a prom dress; and Frank gets a cellphone and temporarily hires Cody as a foreman.
92	23	"Big Girl on Campus"	Patrick Duffy	Larry Kase & Joel Ronkin	May 12, 1995	456369	14.4
Karen and Al convince Dana to take them to a college party. Karen has her eye on a cute guy named Jeremy, but Jeremy decides to dance with Al instead. Karen is fuming, even though she had caught the eye of others at the party ... until Dana learns that Jeremy is a wolf in sheep's clothing, and she and Karen rescue Al just in time, teaching Al that she's not as grown up as she thought. Meanwhile, Carol has a yard sale; and Cody writes a song about Port Washington for a contest.
93	24	"A Foster/Lambert Production"	John Tracy	Howard Adler & Robert Griffard	May 19, 1995	456374	15.1
Carol goes into labor and gives birth to a baby girl, whom she names Lilly Foster-Lambert. At the hospital, the Lambert and Foster children continue their petty squabbling, especially after J.T. forgot to bring the Fosters to the hospital. Through the use of flashbacks, Cody reminds them they have been happier in the times when they got along, and now they have something they can all share: a little sister.

=== Season 5 (1995–96) ===
No. overall	No. in season	Title	Directed by	Written by	Original release date	Prod. code	Viewers (millions)
94	1	"Little Sister Don't Change" "Little Sister Don'tcha"	Joel Zwick	Brian Bird & John Wierick	September 22, 1995	457152	20.3
J.T. and Rich (Jason Marsden) go on a drive-in double date: J.T. with Pepper (Jennifer Aspen)...and Rich with Al. J.T. is seriously troubled and he and Al have a talk, in which she tells him she no longer needs him to protect her. Cody sets a thrilled Dana up with Brad Pitt from Legends of the Fall, but it turns out to be the Brad Pit that played Dead Body #3. Depressed about their controlling mothers, Mark and his friends try to prove their manhood by smoking stogies and Mark gets sick, so Frank offers to take him and his friend camping to do manly things. Note: This is the first appearance of Jason Marsden as Rich Halke, who would become a regular starting with season six. Absent: Angela Watson as Karen Foster
95	2	"Three Girls and a Baby"	Joel Zwick	Julia Newton	September 29, 1995	457151	17.4
Stressed by caring for their new daughter, Frank and Carol go out for a romantic evening, leaving Lilly home with the girls for the first time. Dana is convinced that childcare will be simple, until Lilly accidentally gets locked in her room and the girls must call the Port Washington Fire Department to break down the door. After reading his name in the obituaries, Cody is convinced that he will die, so he decides to give away all of his belongings, but soon realizes he needs them after all.
96	3	"Party Animal"	Patrick Duffy	Bob Rosenfarb	October 13, 1995	457154	15.3
Dana has the opportunity to move into a house with her friends, and at their first party she goes wild with her new freedom! Karen and Al take photos of her getting drunk, dancing, kissing random boys, but when Carol shows Dana a picture of her swinging topless from the chandelier, even Dana is surprised and decides that living at home might not be so bad. Meanwhile, Cody mistakes a toupee creator (Alan Blumenfeld) for a jewel thief and sets out to catch him after he sees him on America's Most Wanted; and Frank argues with Carol that Lilly should have her own room.
97	4	"Midnight Caller"	Patrick Duffy	Larry Kase & Joel Ronkin	October 20, 1995	457153	15.8
J.T. and Dana are stuck doing a community project together for a class, working at a Family Help Line where they meet Howard (Todd Susman), who doesn't seem to care. A boy named Todd calls, saying he's about to commit suicide because he's about to enter a stepfamily situation. Also, Cody seems to be the only one who can soothe Lilly.
98	5	"Maid to Order"	Patrick Duffy	Howard Adler & Robert Griffard	October 27, 1995	457155	16.0
Frank decides to hire a housekeeper, so he and J.T. interview potential employees. After having no luck whatsoever, Frank leaves to run an errand and tells J.T. to do the last interview himself: aspiring model Carrie. J.T. hires her although she has no experience. Meanwhile, Carol encourages Karen in a head-cheerleader competition and is in for some surprises; and Cody teaches old women aerobics.
99	6	"Don't Ask"	Joel Zwick	Casey Maxwell Clair	November 3, 1995	457156	16.4
Frank and Carol become frustrated with their children constantly asking them to run their errands and small favors. Eventually, they lose their patience and implement a rule that the children must do everything for themselves. The rule is put to the test when Brendan — wanting to go on a trip with his soccer team to attend a Green Bay Packers game — decides not to "bother" his parents to have them sign a permission slip for him. Meanwhile, aspiring country singer Karen is approached by a man claiming to be a record producer, who promises to take her demo tape to a major studio in exchange for a $500 fee. However, the naïve Karen later realizes she was ripped off and that she will probably never recover her money ... or ever become a big star. Dana gives her sister solace by getting her song played on a local radio station. Also, Cody orders a Kalashnikov but gets Russian bride Ludmilla (Mary-Pat Green) instead. Note: Angela Watson covers the Patty Loveless song "Blame It on Your Heart". Note: This is the last storyline for the character of Brendan Lambert. Josh Byrne's character would be reduced to 30-second, one-liner-type appearances before being dropped entirely in season 7.
100	7	"Hello, Mr. Chips"	Patrick Duffy	Bob Rosenfarb	November 10, 1995	457160	16.8
Al has just lost another job and Frank encourages her to be a "team player." Karen tells Al of a job at the mall. Al gets the job at a cookie store called Mr. Chips run by Mr. Sloan (Richard Kline) and named after a monkey she ends up having to bring home. Carol wants Frank to play Tarzan for a little show but Frank makes up an excuse not to, so Carol finds another guy, Troy (Jerry Penacoli), while J.T. and Rich bet that Mark can beat a great pool hustler (Peter Spellos). Note: Richard Kline played Larry on Three's Company along with Suzanne Somers who played Chrissy.
101	8	"Roadie"	Patrick Duffy	Larry Kase & Joel Ronkin	November 17, 1995	457161	17.6
Mark's favorite singer, Christi Rose (Debbie Gibson), is coming to town. Cody gets a job as her roadie and introduces her to Mark, who promptly passes out. Christi falls for Cody and offers him a fulltime job as her bodyguard. Frank finally buys a car for the teenagers but refuses to let them use it.
102	9	"The Wall"	Patrick Duffy	Julia Newton	November 24, 1995	457159	14.6
Fear of ending up on the "loser wall" is enough to get Mark Foster to work out. However, working out is not enough to keep Mark Foster off the "loser wall." Despite this, Mark is asked to a dance by Tawny Spencer (Julie Benz), the prettiest girl in school. When her bullying ex Chuck (Brad Hawkins) threatens Mark, Mark stands up to him. Meanwhile, Carol and a (begrudgingly) Frank go on a free trip to the spa, where Frank encounters Inga, the Swedish "strong-arm" masseuse. When Dana's feminist group votes Cody in and one girl Lauren (Senta Moses) thinks he is very cute, he brings the group success, but what's the catch?
103	10	"Baby Come Back"	Joel Zwick	Cary Okmin	December 1, 1995	457158	16.8
While babysitting Lilly, J.T. and Al take her to an audition in Milwaukee, for a baby-food commercial, but they return home with the wrong baby. Also, Carol and Frank try to spend more time with each other at Hair Spectacular '95 but Frank hates it and he and Carol fight, while Cody and Dana get trapped in a magic box.
104	11	"The Fight Before Christmas"	Joel Zwick	Howard Adler & Robert Griffard	December 15, 1995	457162	17.0
Frank's old friend Mitch Crawford (David Graf) comes to town so Carol and Frank set Al up with Mitch's son Matt (Andrew Keegan). Both Al and Matt come in with a bad attitude, but they soon discover they have a lot in common and start having fun - so much fun that they end up making out in the driveway as the car gets covered with snow. When Frank discovers them, he kicks Matt, his mom (Mariangela Pino), and his dad out of their house. Al goes with them because she thinks her father is being unreasonable. The owner of the tree lot where J.T. works is not into the Christmas spirit so Cody's friend George (John Astin) teaches J.T. some true Christmas values. Cody has an accident while creating a new invention for his van.
105	12	"What's Wrong with This Picture?"	Joel Zwick	Brian Bird & John Wierick	January 5, 1996	457163	19.4
Dana admires feminist abstract artist Jayne McNeil (Melanie Wilson) and is honored to be chosen to pose for her, and knowing she'll be part of a great work, she agrees to pose nude. Convinced that the work will be abstract and she won't be recognizable, she proudly invites Frank, Carol, Karen, and Al to the charity auction where it will be unveiled. Unfortunately, McNeil decided to change to Photo-Realism style and Dana is very recognizable. Carol is determined to outbid the "perverts," but Frank forbids her to top $100,000. Also, Frank tries to kill a rat (Cody's advice doesn't help); and J.T. dates a Mafia man's daughter, Casey (Robyn Bliley). Note: This is the second of three episodes in which Melanie Wilson guest-starred.
106	13	"Beautiful Ladies of Wrestling"	Patrick Duffy	Casey Maxwell Clair	January 12, 1996	457164	19.0
J.T. and Frank will do anything for Super Bowl tickets, even dress up like women and wrestle Assault (Spice Williams) and Battery for 10 rounds to claim them. Meanwhile, Mark's principal Mrs. Whitney (Jeanette Miller) wants to place him in a school for the gifted. On his first day at the new school, Mark gets a "C" on a pop quiz. He neglects his friends and stays up all weekend studying. Also, Cody invents food clothes in order to survive in the woods; and Karen sneaks in well past her curfew.
107	14	"Torn Between Two Mothers"	Joel Zwick	Howard Adler & Robert Griffard	January 26, 1996	457157	18.1
Frank's mother (June Lockhart) comes to town to see Lilly and tells Carol how to do everything. While everyone else is enjoying "Nana", Carol grows more and more frustrated with her as her advice becomes more and more personal. Finally, because of a talk with Carol, Frank stands up to his mother. Meanwhile, J.T. becomes a target in girls' self-defense lessons whose instructor (Diane Delano) shows no mercy for any attacker; and Cody takes a job having brain experiments done on him.
108	15	"Snow Bunnies"	Patrick Duffy	Bob Rosenfarb	February 2, 1996	457168	16.2
Al, her boyfriend Matt (Andrew Keegan), and some other friends plan a ski trip, but Frank refuses to let Al go, so Stephanie (Paige Peterson) "The Love Boat", takes her place and after talking to J.T., Al gets worried. J.T. and Al go up to check on Matt and "The Love Boat", but Matt proves he only cares for Al. Cody suffers from a bad case of hiccups while Carol has nightmares after reading horror books.
109	16	"Secret Admirer"	Patrick Duffy	Julia Newton	February 9, 1996	457166	16.6
Frank buys Carol a Swiss Rolet watch for Valentine's Day and pretends it is the real thing. Carol feels badly about Frank spending too much money so she tries to return it, but the saleslady (Nancy Linari) thinks it's a scam and she gets thrown in jail, and when Frank comes to get her she refuses to leave with him. Cody writes love letters to Dana, in order to prove that love is real. Dana thinks she knows who has been writing the letters, but is surprised when she finds out the truth and what comes from it.
110	17	"Forever Young"	Joel Zwick	Brian Bird & John Wierick	February 16, 1996	457167	16.8
Frank and Carol go to a class with Lilly for parents of young kids, and wonder if they're too old. They try to be "young" like some of the other parents. Kenny and Bonnie (Andrea Elson) from the parenting class invite Carol and Frank out to a grunge club with the parents of another kid and they realize that they don't need to change their entire lifestyle for Lilly's sake. Karen is upset about a guy, so J.T. and Rich bet with Dana that they won't argue for a girl. Cody invents new greeting cards for ordinary days.
111	18	"Guess Who's Coming to Dinner?"	Patrick Duffy	Cary Okmin	February 23, 1996	457169	18.4
Cody's cheesehead gives him the ability to predict the winning lottery numbers, so Karen, Mark, and Brendan try to take advantage of that and get the numbers from him. Thinking it's not fair to keep it all to himself he puts the numbers up on the big video board at the Packers game and it makes the ESPN Play of the Day — making a lot of winners and the prize basically worthless. Also, J.T meets a girl named Laura who believes that he is Lilly's father, while Dana introduces Frank and Carol to her new boyfriend Fleming (Michael B. Silver) who is very rude and insensitive and has a surprise for Dana.
112	19	"Do the Right Thing"	Joel Zwick	Meredith Siler	March 8, 1996	457165	14.9
J.T. has a huge test coming up, and Rich is able to get a copy of it. J.T. decides not to cheat on the test, but to study for it, and he ends up getting a B. When he and Rich get their books mixed up, Dana finds the cheat sheet, and when Frank finds it he tells J.T. he's pulling him out of school. Later, Frank overhears Rich returning for the book and he apologizes and they make up. Carol tries to prevent Al from doing something crazy with her friend Tina (Bonnie Morgan); Cody buys some cookies from Girl Scouts. Note: This episode marks Sasha Mitchell's final appearance in the series, until he makes a guest appearance in the seventh season.
113	20	"The Bodyguard Formerly Known as Prince"	Patrick Duffy	Larry Kase & Joel Ronkin	March 15, 1996	457170	13.9
Dana, Karen, and Al go to a ski lodge for a weekend and meet three good-looking guys, including the Prince of Calderone. The prince (Karen's) wants people to like him for who he is, and henceforth makes his bodyguard (Dana's) claim to be the prince. Also, Rich gives the family a good-luck chain letter while Carol gives everyone shampoo. At the end, Rich and Brendan were the only ones who respected the chain and didn't use the shampoo while the rest of the family end up with orange hair. Note: Beginning with this episode, Sasha Mitchell is no longer on the show, although his casting and footage in the opening credits continue for the remainder of the season. Absent: Sasha Mitchell as Cody Lambert
114	21	"Major Pain"	Patrick Duffy	Bob Rosenfarb	April 26, 1996	457171	13.5
Dana cannot determine what to do in college and J.T. and Rich are not able to major in "Nude Volleyball," so they all take a career-placement test from a clueless proctor (Billy Stevenson). The results of the placement test say J.T. and Rich should become doctors and Dana should become a guard at a women's prison. Livid with these results, Dana demands a retest and discovers that the test center run by Mr. Newton (Rick Scarry) is a fraud. Also, Frank hires a hyperactive new worker named Flash who has never worked in construction before. Note: This episode marks the first of four appearances of Jeff Juday as Flash, a character who was intended to be a replacement for Sasha Mitchell as Cody Lambert. Absent: Sasha Mitchell as Cody Lambert
115	22	"We're Going to Disney World (Part 1)"	Richard Correll	Brian Bird & John Wierick	May 3, 1996	457173	12.0
Frank's mother (June Lockhart) offers the entire family a trip to the Walt Disney World Resort on Frank and Carol's anniversary weekend. Flash shows up to return Frank's hammer and ends up staying the weekend, determined to ride all the rides and visit all the attractions to break the record held by a Russian. J.T. and Rich dip into their apartment fund so Rich can come, but posing as J.T. Disney (Walt Disney's nephew), J.T. spends the whole fund trying to attract two beautiful girls for him and Rich. Karen thinks of entering a country music contest with Dana and Al as backup singers. Absent: Sasha Mitchell as Cody Lambert
116	23	"We're Going to Disney World (Part 2)"	Richard Correll	Casey Maxwell Clair	May 10, 1996	457174	12.7
After arguing with her sisters, Karen tries to sing alone but finally realizes she has stage fright, and Dana and Al help her overcome it. Frank and Carol can finally have their private moment thanks to Frank's mother. Flash wins his challenge with Mark and Brendan's help. J.T. and Rich want to end their friendship, but realize they are acting dumb and finally reconcile. Absent: Sasha Mitchell as Cody Lambert
117	24	"Men at Work"	Joel Zwick	Scott Spencer Gordon	May 17, 1996	457172	12.5
J.T. and Rich eagerly apply and are hired at a restaurant run by Mr. Packwood (Perry Anzilotti), who employs sexy waitresses. Dana and her feminist friends had planned to protest against the place, and while working there J.T. and Rich realize how bad harassment really is, and Dana is proud of both of them. Frank converts part of the basement into a lounge using items he bought from a closed tavern. While the men love it, Carol has an accident with one of the lounge's "toys". Flash stays with the Lamberts while his apartment is being fumigated. Note: This is the last appearance of Jeff Juday as Flash, although Carol and Frank invited him to move into their house to avoid driving eight hours back and forth from Kansas City to Port Washington. This was also Flash's first time seeing the Lambert-Foster house. Absent: Sasha Mitchell as Cody Lambert

=== Season 6 (1997) ===
No. overall	No. in season	Title	Directed by	Written by	Original release date	Prod. code	Viewers (millions)
118	1	"Crazy Love"	Joel Zwick	Brian Bird & John Wierick	March 7, 1997	465352	14.59
Dana is told she must tutor another student. As she goes on about what "moron jock" she will tutor this time, she discovers it's Rich, whom she loathes. But the first thing they learn is that opposites attract, and sparks fly and they start dating. Meanwhile Carol and Frank are eager to be alone and away from the ever-present Jean-Luc, but when they escape for a much-needed romantic weekend, they find Jean-Luc awaiting them. Note: This episode marks the first appearances of Bronson Pinchot (as Jean-Luc) and Emily Mae Young (as Lilly Foster-Lambert), who was age-advanced to 5 years old. Young is credited only for the episodes she appears in, while Pinchot is credited for all episodes, even the ones in which he doesn't appear. Starting with this episode, Josh Byrne will also be credited only for the episodes he appears in. For this season, the cast and some producers' names are now shown during the teaser scene at the beginning of the show.
119	2	"Road Trip"	Joel Zwick	Casey Maxwell Clair	March 14, 1997	465357	14.58
J.T. and Rich convince Frank that they're mature enough to drive down to Mexico. After traveling almost the whole way, they discover that Dana has stowed away in the backseat. In the border town of Tejada, they end up in jail, with Rich giving all his money to Dana, leaving the guys unable to pay for the burritos they just ate. Dana's mouthing off to the officer (Carlos Lacamara) over what she sees as him trying to take advantage of her only makes things worse. In the meantime, Carol has a bright idea: Frank should teach Jean-Luc how to drive. But for once he refuses, and Carol takes her life in her own hands when she attempts to teach Jean-Luc herself.
120	3	"Sex, Lies and Videotape"	Joel Zwick	Adam Markowitz	March 21, 1997	465354	14.33
J.T. accepts a hasty marriage proposal from Michelle (Francoise Robertson), a sexy French woman 10 years his senior, but Jean-Luc discovers that serious hidden strings are attached. Michelle is trying to get J.T. to marry her so she can stay in America because she's about to lose her visa and must return to France. Meanwhile, after Frank refuses to let him go see Showgirls, Mark and his friends go to the video store and discover Naughty Nurses in a video case of The Little Mermaid. After they get caught watching it in the garage, Frank has a long talk with Mark. Absent: Josh Byrne as Brendan Lambert
121	4	"Just Say Maybe"	Patrick Duffy	Brian Bird & John Wierick	March 28, 1997	465360	13.48
The kids all head off to Rockfest '97, causing Carol (as usual) to worry they might misbehave. Just as she had feared, Al's friend Will (Josh Keaton) tempts her to try marijuana but Al decides not to try it. Meanwhile, Carol's friend from high school, Patti (Karen Austin), develops a crush on Jean-Luc after her husband Dave (David Graf) ignores her. Absent: Emily Mae Young as Lilly Foster-Lambert
122	5	"The "L" Word"	Joel Zwick	Shelly Landau	April 4, 1997	465361	13.06
Frank and Jean-Luc go camping to do some "male-bonding". Frank tells Jean-Luc not to tell anyone he's a contractor because he doesn't want everyone asking him to fix everything that breaks down. So Jean-Luc tells the couple next door that "we're certainly not contractors, but brain surgeons". The wife goes into labor just as the husband goes fishing, so Frank and Jean-Luc must deliver the baby. Back at home, Dana begins to question her relationship with Rich when an old high-school friend, now attending Harvard University, tries to woo her away. Rich gets jealous and forbids her to see him, which only makes Dana laugh. She accepts her friend's invitation to visit the Harvard campus for a weekend, and Rich unexpectedly shows up. Note: Sam (Alexandra Adi) makes her first appearance at this episode's end although she won't be introduced until the next episode, "She's the One". This episode, like several in this season, is aired out of order. Absent: Emily Mae Young as Lilly Foster-Lambert.
123	6	"She's the One"	Joel Zwick	Bob Rosenfarb	April 11, 1997	465358	13.10
J.T. finally meets the girl of his dreams: tow-truck driver Sam (Alexandra Adi). They have everything in common, and after some urging from his siblings, J.T. asks her out. They go to a Green Bay Packers game, and from then on it is love. J.T. is initially confused about his feelings for Sam until he has a conversation with Jean-Luc, and it becomes clear: He is in love with Sam. Also, Karen's big music break finally comes when she is selected to appear in a video with one of country music's biggest stars, Jimmy Ray Johnston. So Frank, Carol, and Karen all travel to Chicago for the big shoot. But Jimmy Ray only wants Karen to look good - not actually sing. So she quits. Absent: Josh Byrne as Brendan Lambert, Emily Mae Young as Lilly Foster-Lambert
124	7	"Independence Day"	Joel Zwick	Adam Markowitz	April 18, 1997	465365	13.19
J.T. asserts his independence by moving out of his parents' house to a not-so-joyful Jean-Luc's. After some problems there, he then moves into his own apartment, which is totally rundown. After Sam and Frank visit and talk to J.T., Frank decides to make an apartment for J.T. at the house. Meanwhile, Carol wants to spend more quality time with the girls and must trick them into a "girls night out" and take them to a karaoke bar where they perform "I'm So Excited".
125	8	"Reality Bites"	Patrick Duffy	Jill Cagerman	April 25, 1997	465364	11.33
When J.T. and Rich squander their money and can't pay the rent on their new apartment, they are evicted by their landlord Frank a.k.a. Mr. Lambert, Sir. Meanwhile, because his daughter Danielle is in France and her birthday is coming, Jean-Luc spoils Lilly with an abundance of gifts to ease his pain over not being able to be with Danielle. In the end, Carol works it out so Danielle can come stateside and see him. Note: This is the only appearance of Jean-Luc's daughter Danielle.
126	9	"Locket Man"	Patrick Duffy	Cary Okmin	May 2, 1997	465368	12.89
A clueless Rich gives Dana a piece of recycled jewelry for her birthday, even after J.T. warns him it's a bad idea - especially since it's a locket containing a picture of him with his ex-flame! He goes to surprise Dana while she's out with Al and Karen. Meanwhile, Carol and the kids must endure Frank's rite of passage of going through a mid-life crisis: After being called Grandpa by the ice-cream man, he hurts his back while getting a drink. Absent: Josh Byrne as Brendan Lambert
127	10	"How the West Was Won"	Richard Correll	Larry Kase & Joel Ronkin	May 9, 1997	465374	11.60
Frank's disappointment over the kids not cleaning up the house leads him to dream he's in the "Wild West," circa 1880, where it's up to the inebriated Sheriff Frank to clean up and rid the town of the vile French gunslinger Black Bart (aka Jean-Luc), who has a mind for trouble and his eyes on the Sheriff's girl - the lovely Miss Kitty (aka Carol). All of the kids are in the dream as townsfolk.
128	11	"Absolutely Fabio"	Joel Zwick	Meredith Siler	May 16, 1997	465366	12.11
Jean-Luc keeps the kids in suspense when he tells them he's cutting the hair of a famous celebrity: Fabio. Meanwhile, Rich and Dana try to control Lilly's birthday party after Dana and Carol make a bet.
129	12	"Loose Lips"	Patrick Duffy	Adam Markowitz	May 23, 1997	465370	10.89
When Mark's date (Maggie Lawson) overhears him bragging to his friends about the so-called "special moment" they shared, she calls his bluff in front of his schoolmates, branding him a wimp. Meanwhile, after being dumped by her own date, Karen feels that her "imperfect" body is the culprit and takes drastic measures to improve it. Also Frank has a surprise for J.T. and Rich, who keep stealing food. Absent: Bronson Pinchot as Jean-Luc Rieupeyroux, Emily Mae Young as Lilly Foster-Lambert
130	13	"The Big Date"	Patrick Duffy	Shelly Landau	May 30, 1997	465371	12.37
Al discovers that her blind date is overweight and carrying an even heavier chip on his shoulder. Meanwhile, Carol's "worry-meter" jumps off the scale when Dana, Rich, J.T., and Sam check into a Chicago hotel unsupervised. J.T. thinks it's his lucky night as does Rich, but the ladies have other plans. Absent: Emily Mae Young as Lilly Foster-Lambert
131	14	"Future Shock"	Patrick Duffy	Casey Maxwell Clair	June 6, 1997	465369	8.79
When Rich and Dana go to a wedding with J.T. and Sam, they're teased that someday soon they too will be married. Dana doesn't even try to catch the bouquet, but it lands in her lap! She and Rich each have terrible visions about what that might entail, and become very scared and agree: no more weddings for a while. Meanwhile, Frank and Jean-Luc build Lilly's new jungle-gym despite Frank's terrible cold. Jean-Luc suggests some homemade cold medicine made by a customer "from all-natural juniper berries" and both become completely intoxicated. Absent: Christopher Castile as Mark Foster, Josh Byrne as Brendan Lambert
132	15	"Show Me the Money"	Patrick Duffy	Brian Bird & John Wierick	June 13, 1997	465372	8.46
When J.T. and Rich take a job as sports agents for an up-and-coming college hockey player Eric Barnes (Scott Gurney), they find themselves becoming his personal servants—and dating service—with Karen as the main course. Meanwhile, the battle between the hairdressers and the contractors begins when Carol and Jean-Luc challenge an overly-macho Frank and his pal Moose (Donald Gibb) to a game of bowling, with the losers having to do something the winning team picks. Note: Moose (Donald Gibb) was previously Slasher in season 3. Absent: Josh Byrne as Brendan Lambert, Emily Mae Young as Lilly Foster-Lambert
133	16	"It Didn't Happen One Night"	Joel Zwick	Cary Okmin	June 20, 1997	465359	8.30
Frank orders a new sports channel, and he and Rich spend so much time watching it that they ignore Carol and Dana. Jean-Luc gives the girls makeovers, and helps the guys plan a romantic evening. Kyle, the school hunk, goes on a date with Al, and the date goes well. They seal it with a kiss... but Kyle wants to take things one step further, and tries to sexually assault Al. The petite Al fights him off and tells him it is over. The next morning, Karen is complaining when Al keeps getting calls from guys, but Al finds out she has a new reputation she doesn't want. Al is harassed at school by guys, who begin overtly suggesting they get romantic afterward, but when Karen refuses to stick up for her stepsister, she runs off in tears. Karen then realizes she owes it to Al to ask questions, find out what happened, and expose Kyle as a liar. Absent: Josh Byrne as Brendan Lambert, Emily Mae Young as Lilly Foster-Lambert
134	17	"Macho Man"	Joel Zwick	Larry Kase & Joel Ronkin	June 27, 1997	465362	7.90
J.T., Sam, Rich, Dana, and Al play miniature golf, and Sam wins. She also wins at Ping-Pong, in the video arcade, batting cage, and at billiards. Then Sam runs to J.T.'s aid when he is threatened by a pool-house bully. He begins to feel inadequate, and his dream about marrying Sam turns into a strange nightmare, with Sam's machismo — and Rich's ribbing — getting the best of J.T. Meanwhile, Jean-Luc escorts a fearful Lilly to the doctor for a tetanus shot. Jean-Luc promises to be there with her and hold her hand during the shot, and that she will get a lollipop afterward. But Jean-Luc has a cut on his hand, and also needs a shot, so Jean-Luc and Lilly help each other be brave. J.T. has a dream about marrying Sam but he is the bride and she is the groom.
135	18	"Ain't Misbehavin'"	William Bickley	Liz Sage	July 4, 1997	465373	5.66
When Sam's hours and wages are cut at work and she loses her roommate, she chooses a male coworker named Jamie to be her new roommate. J.T. is hesitant to trust them leading to a break-up between him and Sam. He returns to say he's sorry to Sam but gets the wrong idea about what is going on. Also, Jean-Luc borrows money from Carol (even after Frank objects) to pay his taxes but refuses to return it. Absent: Josh Byrne as Brendan Lambert, Emily Mae Young as Lilly Foster-Lambert
136	19	"The Facts of Life"	Patrick Duffy	Bob Rosenfarb	July 11, 1997	465367	8.35
Lilly sees Dana and Rich kissing, and proudly announces to Frank and Carol that Rich and Dana are going to have a baby. Lilly's parents tell her the facts of life, which she then shares during "show and tell" at school. This causes a conflict between Frank and Carol and Devon (David Kaufman) and Tiffany (Lisa Picotte, Kaufman's real-life wife), the parents of Lilly's best friend Joey. They agree to overlook their differences for their children. Meanwhile, after Jean-Luc tutors Al in French, he notices that J.T. and Rich are into horse-racing and helps them win some money. But when they want to empty their college funds, he's forced to teach them an invaluable lesson about gambling and introduces them to a bookie, Tony (Tony Longo). Absent: Christopher Castile as Mark Foster, Josh Byrne as Brendan Lambert
137	20	"Talking Trash"	Joel Zwick	Liz Sage	July 18, 1997	465363	7.74
Frank buys Carol a birthday present that stresses security rather than romance. J.T. warns him, but he doesn't listen. Carol does not appear to be thrilled about it after getting jewelry and cashmere from Jean-Luc and the kids, respectively. Frank tries to make it up to her, but Carol believes the fact that he loves her and gave her the gift with that love was enough. Dana chooses a "brain" to team up with for the recycling contest, rather than Rich. To retaliate, Rich picks a "bimbo" cheerleader as his teammate. Wanting to show Dana he's not a "flyweight intellectual," he proves that creativity is just as important as book smarts (and wins!!). Absent: Christine Lakin as Al Lambert.
138	21	"Walk Like a Man"	Patrick Duffy	Liz Sage	July 25, 1997	465353	7.96
Mark's basketball team has made it to the championship and Mark and Frank, the coach, ban Carol from attending. She takes it personally and Jean-Luc helps her disguise herself so she can go. But she gives herself away when she starts a fight with a fan (Mary-Pat Green) who insults Mark. J.T. tells Rich that he lets Dana control the relationship, so Rich and J.T. go to a weekend party and Karen and Al coincidentally drag Dana to the same party. Rich dances with another girl, so Dana dances with another guy to make him jealous.
139	22	"Shear Madness"	Patrick Duffy	Larry Kase & Joel Ronkin	August 1, 1997	465355	8.45
Carol and Jean-Luc's new salon is about to open and Jean-Luc is asked to cut Hillary Clinton's hair, and he's nervous enough to want to decline. He is finally able to decipher (through a conversation with Carol) that it all stems from his depression from his divorce. After disapproving of yet another of Al's dates, Frank meets a guy just like himself; they go shopping and Frank sets him up with Al. Al goes on the date but then makes Frank agree not to interfere with her dates. However, she does let him chase off a particularly bad one. Absent: Josh Byrne as Brendan Lambert
140	23	"The Kissing Game"	Patrick Duffy	Shelly Landau	August 8, 1997	465356	7.28
J.T., Al, and Dana are having problems finding privacy when J.T. comes up with the idea to use Carol's new salon as a place for privacy; he also sells the key to friends for the same purpose. But everyone wants it at once so they end up having a party. Carol tries to set up Jean-Luc with her friend Julie. Absent: Christopher Castile as Mark Foster.
141	24	"Bonjour Jean-Luc"	Joel Zwick	Ross Brown	August 15, 1997	465351	7.96
Carol comes back from Hair Spectacular '96 with Jean-Luc, who is to become her new business partner. As they start a new business, Frank must do all the chores. He is happy to do them, but becomes very picky about his cookies. Jean-Luc helps J.T. by teaching him how to dance, but J.T.'s date is a disaster anyway. Jean-Luc tells Karen, Al, and Dana (on separate occasions) that he thinks they are beautiful. Also, Lilly learns to write her name, and Cody calls from his new job in Russia, but Frank has no time to talk to him. Note: This is where the audience finally finds out Cody is in Russia for a new job he acquired. This episode, like several in this season, is aired out of order. This was intended to be the season opener, but ABC never aired it until late Summer as the last new episode of the season as well the last episode to air on the network. This explains why we are suddenly introduced to Jean-Luc while Rich asks several girls' phone numbers (although he was with Dana in the beginning of this season.) This is the final episode to air on ABC before (just like Family Matters) it moved to CBS for its seventh and final season. This episode marks the last appearance of Josh Byrne as Brendan Lambert.

=== Season 7 (1997–98) ===
No. overall	No. in season	Title	Directed by	Written by	Original release date	Prod. code	Viewers (millions)
142	1	"Making the Grade"	Patrick Duffy	Adam Markowitz	September 19, 1997	466501	7.64
It's the first day of school for all the kids, and Karen is off to college. Feeling like she has nothing to do, Carol registers for college, signing up for all of Karen's classes and following her around, embarrassing her, and telling a story in class about when Karen was a baby. She finally realizes that she's ruining Karen's life. Meanwhile, Rich is happy about getting a "C" on his pop quiz, but Dana tells Rich that if he doesn't start taking something seriously, they don't have much of a future together. So, after talking to J.T., Rich stays up all night studying (instead of watching Xena: Warrior Princess with J.T.), and gets an "A", while Dana only gets a "B". Note: This was the first episode to air on CBS. A new opening sequence is used starting with this episode, featuring photo booth-style photos of the individual cast members as each one is introduced now also including Rich (Jason Marsden) as a series regular and minus Josh Byrne as (Brendan Lambert) who is no longer on the show. The chorus of the theme song is now used. As in season 6, some episodes are shown out of order. Absent: Christopher Castile as Mark Foster.
143	2	"A Star is Born"	Patrick Duffy	Mindy Schneider	September 26, 1997	466502	9.26
Dana, Karen, and Al explain to the guys the various virtues of getting a role in teen idol Jeremy Beck (Scott Foley)'s next movie. All three girls audition for the small part of a waitress. Karen, the overconfident diva, is "too asthmatic" for the producer (Ray Abruzzo)'s liking; uber-feminist Dana naively picks apart the role and its backstory, getting herself dismissed without so much as a reading. Al, on the other hand, is just what they are looking for. Al proves to have natural acting talent, doing such a fantastic job that the script is rewritten to strengthen her role. Although overnight success doesn't make a monster out of her in the usual sense, Al greatly enjoys the experience...enough that she plans to quit school and get a GED, in order to become a full-time actress. Frank talks his daughter out of this, however, and Al settles for joining the drama club...although he does offer to drive her to Hollywood himself after she graduates. Back home, Carol and Lily are determined to outdo an obnoxious and snooty classmate—along with the other girl's mom, who's even worse—for a school bake sale. Note: Jaleel White makes his second appearance as Steve Urkel. It's only a cameo and his first-season appearance is not mentioned. Absent: Christopher Castile as Mark Foster.
144	3	"Your Cheatin' Heart"	Richard Correll	Howard Adler & Robert Griffard	October 3, 1997	466503	9.46
Dana and Rich are going to a wedding and Rich begins making stupid excuses for skipping out on Dana. Karen and Al convince Dana that he is cheating on her after they follow him to a girl's house. The three of them see Rich dancing with another woman. Dana barges in, but realizes that he is taking dance lessons to impress her. After being too distracted for romance, Frank and Carol are finally able to get together for a distraction-free evening, but they're too sick to enjoy it.
145	4	"Take This Job and ..."	Patrick Duffy	Brian Bird	October 10, 1997	466504	8.35
J.T. loses his fourth job of the month and can't even afford a date with Sam. He convinces her to get her boss Mr. Evans (Ellis Williams) to hire him as an apprentice mechanic at the garage where she works. J.T. is terrible, and Sam is forced to fire him on the second day after he nearly kills the boss - twice. J.T. is frustrated and angry, but the only sympathy he gets is from the people who lost the betting pool on how many days he would last at the job. After a talk with Carol he decides to talk to Sam and apologize, but she won't listen. He finds a job in the food industry. Meanwhile, Frank becomes obsessed with a boat and Carol just doesn't see why. Absent: Christopher Castile as Mark Foster.
146	5	"Poetic Justice"	Patrick Duffy	Fred Rubin	October 17, 1997	466505	8.21
A teaching assistant leverages his position to try to get a date from Karen. When Karen tells Dana about it, Dana has the perfect plan to catch him in his own deceitful web. Also, Mark is turning into a rebellious teenager since dating a thrashy girl and is getting into trouble. Note: It seems that Mark now has his own room, as J.T. and Rich have their apartment while Brendan has mysteriously left the show at the beginning of the season. Absent: Emily Mae Young as Lilly Foster-Lambert
147	6	"Can't Buy Me Love"	William Bickley	Robin J. Stein	October 24, 1997	466507	8.41
Frank's company is struggling and he's seeking work. One of Carol's former high-school classmates hires him as contractor for a new hotel complex, but he crosses the line with unwanted advances on Carol, so Frank must choose between his job and his family. Meanwhile, Karen and Dana are invited to pledge a sorority known for its vanity and vacuity. Dana isn't interested in joining a sorority that Karen longs to be part of ...but Dana is the one the sorority leader really wants. Note: This is the series' second episode entitled "Can't Buy Me Love". The first with this title is from season 4. (Shannon Elizabeth) appears as Cindi a sorority girl. Absent: Emily Mae Young as Lilly Foster-Lambert
148	7	"Dream Lover"	Joel Zwick	Adam Markowitz	October 31, 1997	466506	7.78
After the big town Halloween party is cancelled, J.T. and his sisters host a costume party at a decrepit old mansion. J.T. and Sam haven't been getting along, and after a costume mixup forces them to go tandem as a horse, she dances with someone else. Fuming about his predicament, J.T. meets Abby, the ghostly 19-year-old inhabitant of the mansion, who committed suicide after a bad breakup many years back. Abby convinces J.T. that his relationship with Sam might have reached its end and it's nobody's fault, and later he and Sam decide to part. Also, Lilly organizes her first Halloween fest. Note: Abby returns as Sarah at the end of the episode and J.T. vivildy tells Al and Karen that he's met her before as the ghost of Abby. Absent: Christopher Castile as Mark Foster.
149	8	"Girls Just Wanna Have Fun"	Patrick Duffy	Mindy Schneider	November 7, 1997	466508	8.82
When Rich's old friend Cassie Evans (Linda Cardellini) moves back to town, they start hanging out, which makes Dana jealous. Rich enjoys playing billiards and video games with Cassie, so Dana asks J.T. to teach her how she can have fun like that with Rich. Meanwhile, Frank's con-man cousin Bert (Fred Willard) shows up and gives the family a gift. Absent: Christopher Castile as Mark Foster, Emily Mae Young as Lilly Foster-Lambert
150	9	"Goodbye, Mr. Chip"	Richard Correll	Howard Adler & Robert Griffard	December 5, 1997	466509	9.39
Karen's boyfriend Chip takes Carol's advice and stands up to Karen, then surprises everyone by breaking up with her. Karen is furious with her mother for interfering and giving Chip advice, then wants to talk to Chip. Dana has better luck helping J.T. and Rich, who have been fighting about everything. Absent: Christopher Castile as Mark Foster, Emily Mae Young as Lilly Foster-Lambert
151	10	"Too Many Santas"	Joel Zwick	Robin J. Stein	December 19, 1997	466512	7.18
To earn extra money, Rich and J.T. take jobs as department-store Santa Clauses. Lilly instantly recognizes her brother as Santa, and concludes that Santa doesn't exist. To reassure his 5-year-old daughter, Frank - and just about everyone else, without consulting one another - dresses as Santa and visits Lilly. Meanwhile, J.T. pines for Sam after finding a Christmas present that he bought for her when they were still dating. When J.T. goes to her apartment to surprise her, he sees a guy going inside, then sees her hugging him and kissing him on the cheek.
152	11	"Phoney Business"	Joel Zwick	Brian Bird	January 9, 1998	466510	7.55
Al takes a job as a model in a commercial she thinks is for suntan lotion, but when she sees the ad on TV she's outraged that it's for a phone-sex hotline! She and J.T. try to make the corrupt producer admit the truth but get nowhere. But Frank, who had seen the ad and gotten Rich to fill him in, shows up and makes the producer see things 'from his point of view.' Meanwhile, Carol and Dana try to force healthier food on the family after taking a nutrition class, but even Carol and Dana can't stand it.
153	12	"Goin' to the Chapel"	Joel Zwick	Fred Rubin	January 16, 1998	466511	9.52
Dana wants to take her relationship with Rich one step further, getting into a big argument with Carol, who fears that Dana is planning to have sex and forbids it. So Dana asks Rich to elope. Meanwhile, J.T. pretends to be a fitness fanatic to impress aerobics-instructor Monica (Portia Dawson), but he later learns that being himself is a better idea. In a heart-to-heart, Carol admits that she needs to accept that Dana is a young woman who should be able to make her own decisions. Absent: Christopher Castile as Mark Foster
154	13	"Feet of Clay"	Patrick Duffy	Garrett Donovan & Neil Goldman	January 23, 1998	466514	9.02
Rich and Dana enroll in a pottery class, but only Rich turns out to have a talent for it. Meanwhile, Carol and Frank's sexual role-playing makes J.T. and Karen think Carol is cheating on Frank and they decide to follow them around. Absent: Christopher Castile as Mark Foster.
155	14	"Pain in the Class"	Patrick Duffy	Adam Markowitz	January 30, 1998	466515	9.61
Frank worries about attending his upcoming 25th class reunion and seeing his old nemesis Roy Tucker (Edward Edwards). Sure enough, Roy brags about his chain of tire stores, shows off his date for the evening, and humiliates Frank. But Carol finds out that Roy is actually assistant manager of one store and paid an attractive cashier to be his date. Meanwhile, J.T. is focused on watching a pay-per-view bikini contest with Rich and a bunch of their friends on a night that he is supposed to be babysitting Lilly. When J.T. tells his whining sister to go upstairs, she goes outside with her stuffed animal to have a tea party of her own and does not come home. Absent: Christopher Castile as Mark Foster.
156	15	"The Half Monty"	Joel Zwick	Liz Sage	February 27, 1998	466513	5.60
J.T. and Rich are broke but want to go on a skiing trip with Sam and Dana, so they take jobs as male strippers at a local nightclub. Meanwhile, Frank and Carol counsel young couples by sharing their secrets, but may need counseling themselves when they reveal too much. Note: With this episode, CBS decided to cancel Step by Step. The series was then put on a three-month hiatus, returning to burn off episodes beginning June 5, 1998. Absent: Christopher Castile as Mark Foster.
157	16	"And Justice for Some"	Patrick Duffy	Shelly Landau	June 5, 1998	466519	6.08
Frank and J.T. attend a Milwaukee Bucks-Chicago Bulls game, but switch seats when the man sitting in front of J.T. refuses to remove his tall cowboy hat. Then a drawing for a new truck is held and J.T. wins. This sparks a father-son feud that turns bitter, until Carol invites a judge over to settle matters. Before he makes the ruling, Carol makes an impassioned speech about father-son relationships, and Frank and J.T. settle on selling and splitting the proceeds evenly. Meanwhile, Al and Karen have shown little interest in Dana's self-defense class, but this changes when they meet their handsome instructor, and the two girls become rivals for his attention. Absent: Christopher Castile as Mark Foster.
158	17	"The Understudy"	William Bickley	Larry Kase & Joel Ronkin	June 12, 1998	466517	6.08
When she gets only an understudy role after auditioning for the lead in a local theater production, Al refuses to learn her part and ends up in hot water when the star falls ill on opening night. Meanwhile, after Lilly gets an exceptional score on an aptitude test, Dana tries to help her fulfill her destiny as a genius. Dana also awaits word on an internship.
159	18	"We're in the Money"	Richard Correll	Brian Bird	June 19, 1998	466516	7.13
Cody returns from his self-described World Tour, bringing strange gifts for Karen and J.T. and a large check for Frank and Carol. The couple argues over how to spend the money and dream about what it could do for the family. J.T. gives his gift to Mark, and Carol tells Frank something about her father and her childhood. Note: Sasha Mitchell makes his only season seven, and last appearance on the series as Cody.
160	19	"Movin' On Up"	Steve Witting	Meredith Siler	June 26, 1998	466518	6.25
In the series finale, a yuppie couple, the Adlers (Dan Gilvezan and Melanie Wilson), tour the house and make an offer that Frank and Carol can't pass up. Everyone is excited, particularly since they'll finally be able to move from their undersized home. But Lilly likes her house and makes it clear to her folks that she will not move, and their attempts to reason with her fail. When the yuppies return, they show their true colors, disgusting the Lamberts so much that they cancel the sale.
