= Step by Step (TV series) =

American television sitcom (1991–1998)

- Genre: Family sitcom
- Created by: William Bickley; Michael Warren
- Developed by: Thomas L. Miller; Robert L. Boyett
- Starring: Patrick Duffy; Suzanne Somers; Staci Keanan; Brandon Call; Angela Watson; Christine Lakin; Patrika Darbo; Christopher Castile; Josh Byrne; Peggy Rea; Sasha Mitchell; Emily Mae Young; Jason Marsden; Bronson Pinchot
- Theme music composer: Jesse Frederick and Bennett Salvay
- Opening theme: "Second Time Around" performed by Jesse Frederick and Teresa James
- Ending theme: "Second Time Around" (instrumental) (season 1, used sporadically afterwards)
- Composers: Jesse Frederick Bennett Salvay (both; seasons 1–2); Gary Boren (seasons 3–5); Steven Chesne (seasons 3–7)
- Country of origin: United States
- Original language: English
- No. of seasons: 7
- No. of episodes: 160 (list of episodes)

Production
- Executive producers: Thomas L. Miller; Robert L. Boyett; William Bickley; Michael Warren; Alan Eisenstock (season 1); Larry Mintz (season 1); Ross Brown (seasons 2–7); Bob Rosenfarb (seasons 6–7)
- Production locations: Culver Studios Culver City, California (1991–1993); Warner Bros. Studios Burbank, California (1993–1998)
- Camera setup: Film; Multi-camera
- Running time: approx. 23 minutes (per episode)
- Production companies: Bickley-Warren Productions; Miller-Boyett Productions; Lorimar Television (1991–1993); Warner Bros. Television (1993–1998)

Original release
- Network: ABC
- Release: September 20, 1991 – August 15, 1997
- Network: CBS
- Release: September 19, 1997 – June 26, 1998

Step by Step is an American television sitcom created by William Bickley and Michael Warren for ABC's TGIF Friday-night lineup. Set in Port Washington, Wisconsin, it follows single parents Frank Lambert and Carol Foster (Patrick Duffy and Suzanne Somers), each with three children, who marry and form a blended family in spite of their children's mutual resentment. It aired on ABC from September 20, 1991 to August 15, 1997, and then on CBS from September 19, 1997 to June 26, 1998, with a total of 160 half-hour episodes spanning seven seasons.

Among its co-stars are Staci Keanan, Angela Watson, and Christopher Castile as Carol's children Dana, Karen, and Mark, Brandon Call, Christine Lakin, and Josh Byrne as Frank's children J.T., Al, and Brendan, and Sasha Mitchell as Frank's nephew Cody.

The series was often described as a copy of The Brady Bunch because of its similar premise, and was otherwise ignored by critics after the pilot episode, which met with a consistently negative reception. The series was initially cancelled by ABC in May 1997 due to declining ratings; however, CBS acquired the series along with Family Matters for their own Friday-night comedy lineup, but only lasted for another season before it was officially cancelled in June 1998.

== Premise ==
Frank Lambert, a divorced contractor whose wife left him, has three children: John Thomas (J.T.), Alicia (Al), and Brendan. Carol Foster, a widow and a salon owner, also has three children: Dana, Karen, and Mark. Both families live in Port Washington, Wisconsin.

Frank and Carol marry while vacationing in Jamaica after a whirlwind courtship. They planned to keep their marriage a secret, but Frank accidentally reveals to J.T. that they are married during a barbecue he and Carol hold to introduce all the children, leaving them surprised and angry at first.

Each episode depicts typical situations for a new blended family. Family members' differences cause arguments and resentments, but over time they grow to tolerate and become loyal to one another.

== Cast and characters ==
=== Main cast ===
- Patrick Duffy as Frank Lambert, Carol's second husband and J.T., Alicia and Brendan's divorced father who works as a contractor
- Suzanne Somers as Carol Foster: Frank's second wife and Dana, Karen and Mark's widowed mother who is the proprietor of a salon
- Staci Keanan as Dana Foster, Carol's first daughter and Frank's stepdaughter
- Brandon Call as John Thomas "J.T." Lambert, Frank's first son and Carol's stepson
- Angela Watson as Karen Foster, Carol's second daughter and Frank's stepdaughter
- Christine Lakin as Alicia "Al" Lambert, Frank's daughter and Carol's stepdaughter
- Patrika Darbo as Penny Baker Williams (season 1), Carol's sister and Dana, Karen and Mark's maternal aunt
- Christopher Castile as Mark Foster, Carol's son and Frank's stepson
- Josh Byrne as Brendan Lambert (seasons 1–6), Frank's second son and Carol's stepson
- Peggy Rea as Ivy Baker Williams (season 1), Carol's mother and Dana, Karen and Mark's maternal grandmother
- Sasha Mitchell as Cody Lambert (seasons 1–5, guest in season 7), Frank's nephew and J.T., Alicia and Brendan's paternal cousin who has maturity and intelligence that belittle his dimwitted nature which surprises the other family members. He resides in the van in the family's driveway.
- Emily Mae Young as Lily Foster-Lambert (seasons 6–7; originally portrayed by Lauren Meyering and Kristina Meyering in seasons 4–5), Frank and Carol's daughter and Dana, J.T., Karen, Alicia, Brendan and Mark's younger half-sister
- Jason Marsden as Rich Halke (seasons 5–7), J.T.'s best friend and, eventually, Dana's love interest
- Bronson Pinchot as Jean-Luc Rieupeyroux (season 6), Carol's business partner

=== Recurring ===
- Jeff Juday as Jake "Flash" Gordon (season 5, appearing in four episodes), a handyman with a goofy but well-meaning personality who works for Frank
- Alexandra Adi as Samantha Milano (seasons 6–7), the girlfriend of J.T.

== Episodes ==
Season	Episodes	Originally released		
Season	Episodes	First released	Last released	Network
1	22	September 20, 1991	April 24, 1992	ABC
2	24	September 18, 1992	May 21, 1993	ABC
3	23	September 24, 1993	May 20, 1994	ABC
4	24	September 23, 1994	May 19, 1995	ABC
5	24	September 22, 1995	May 17, 1996	ABC
6	24	March 7, 1997	August 15, 1997	ABC
7	19	September 19, 1997	June 26, 1998	CBS

== Production ==
The series was created and executive produced by William Bickley and Michael Warren, and developed and executive produced by Thomas L. Miller and Robert L. Boyett. It was produced by Bickley-Warren Productions, Miller-Boyett Productions and Lorimar Television.

The opening sequence depicts the Foster-Lambert family at a lakeside amusement park in Port Washington. It was filmed at the inland Six Flags Magic Mountain in Valencia, California, with a coastline digitally superimposed onto its parking lot in aerial shots. Prominently depicted in the sequence is Magic Mountain's since-defunct Colossus wooden roller coaster.

ABC chose to delay the series' sixth season to the 1996–1997 mid-season (premiering in March 1997), in order to make room on that season's fall schedule for freshman sitcoms Sabrina the Teenage Witch and Clueless, which joined established series Family Matters and Boy Meets World on the TGIF lineup; the network canceled it after six seasons in May 1997, due to declining ratings. CBS concurrently reached a deal with Miller-Boyett Productions to acquire the rights to it and Family Matters from ABC, as that network attempted to build its own Friday night lineup of family-friendly situation comedies for the fall of 1997, called the "CBS Block Party".

Ratings continued to decline despite the network change, and the show ended its run in June 1998 without an official series finale. According to Staci Keanan and Christine Lakin, the series was supposed to end with Dana and Rich's wedding at the house, and elaborate preparations were underway for it prior to the series' abrupt end.

== Syndication ==
In September 1995, Warner Bros. Domestic Television Distribution began distributing the series for broadcast in off-network syndication.

The series previously aired reruns on ABC Family (on what was then known as Fox Family), Hub Network and TruTV.

In Australia, Step by Step aired on the Seven Network from 1991 to 1995 and on the Nine Network from 1996 to 2000. In 2011, Step by Step was acquired by 7TWO. In 2015, 111 Greats started airing the whole series.

In the U.K., Seasons 1 and 2 of Step by Step aired sporadically on ITV weekday mornings at 10 throughout parts of the spring and summer in 1994 and 1995. Episodes were also shown to a lesser extent during 1996 and 1997.

On September 29, 2017, Hulu acquired the streaming rights to Step by Step along with fellow Warner Bros. TV properties Family Matters, Full House, Hangin' with Mr. Cooper and Perfect Strangers, in addition to fellow ABC programs Boy Meets World, Dinosaurs and Home Improvement. The series expired on Hulu on September 30, 2021.

Step by Step moved to HBO Max on October 1, 2021 until the show was removed from the service on September 30, 2025.

== Home media ==
Warner Home Video originally released a six-episode Television Favorites collection on DVD on June 27, 2006 until September 26, 2023 when the complete series set was finally released for the first time. Warner Archive Collection has released individual seasons on DVD in Region 1. These are Manufacture-on-Demand (MOD) releases, available from Warner's online store and Amazon.com.

DVD Name	Ep #	Release dates
DVD Name	Ep #	Region 1
The Complete First Season	22	June 12, 2018
The Complete Second Season	24	September 18, 2018
The Complete Third Season	23	November 20, 2018
The Complete Fourth Season	24	February 12, 2019
The Complete Fifth Season	24	November 5, 2019
The Complete Sixth Season	24	February 11, 2020
The Complete Seventh and Final Season	19	April 21, 2020
The Complete Series	160	September 26, 2023

== Critical reception ==
According to Entertainment Weekly writer Ken Tucker, Step by Step was generally regarded as a copy of The Brady Bunch and otherwise ignored by critics.

Reviews of the pilot episode were consistently negative, with Howard Rosenberg of the Los Angeles Times calling it "plain awful" and Matt Roush of USA Today describing it as "demonically slick junk food"; other critics declared it to be the "worst" new show of the season. It was frequently compared to Brooklyn Bridge, a critically acclaimed CBS series which premiered the same day, as representing the "worst" and "best" of television, respectively. Variety's Jean Rosenbluth was more positive, calling it a "modestly amusing, occasionally heartwarming show" despite its "utter lack of originality", and argued that while it wasn't comparable to Shakespeare, "neither was The Brady Bunch".

Of the acting performances, Somers and Keanan received praise, even in otherwise negative reviews. Somers was singled out for praise by Rosenbluth and Roush. Rosenbluth described the children as a "well-cast lot", in particular singling out Keanan as the "most amusing"; her "wisecracking timing" was commended by Ray Richmond of Knight-Ridder News Service, who in addition forwarded the actress as the "best thing" about the series, a sentiment echoed by Ron Weiskind of the Pittsburgh Post-Gazette, who found her to be the only one who "shows any talent" out of the cast.

Brady Bunch creator Sherwood Schwartz later said that at one point he considered filing a lawsuit over Step by Step, claiming that they "stole my show" and likening its advertising as a "Brady Bunch for the 1990s" to "intrusion or certainly riding on coattails."
