= Bob Rosenfarb =

American television producer and writer (1951–2026)

Robert Martin Rosenfarb (September 16, 1951 – March 3, 2026) was an American television producer and writer known for his work on Step by Step, Who's the Boss?, and Head of the Class. Born in Brooklyn, New York, he graduated from Fairleigh Dickinson University and moved to Los Angeles in 1978, eventually becoming a writer and producer. Rosenfarb died on March 3, 2026, at the age of 74.
