= Angela Watson =

American actress

- Born: 1975 or 1976 (age 50–51); Danville, Illinois, U.S.
- Education: John Burroughs High School (Burbank, California)
- Occupations: Actress, model
- Years active: 1991–2007
- Spouse: Brian Nahas (m. 2020)
- Children: 1

Angela Watson (born 1975 or 1976) is an American actress and former model, best known for her role as Karen Foster on the 1990s sitcom Step by Step (1991–1998).

== Early life and education ==
Watson was born in Danville, Illinois. When she was 11 years old, her family relocated to Florida after her father retired from farming.

From a young age, she participated in beauty pageants and dance competitions, collecting more than 200 trophies and 60 crowns. In 1987, she was named Face Finders' Model of the Year, after which her family moved to California so she could pursue an acting career.

By 1994, Watson had graduated from John Burroughs High School in Burbank, California.

== Career ==
=== Acting ===
Watson made her television debut in the early 1990s. Her acting credits include:

Year	Title	Role	Notes
1991	Davis Rules	Alice Hansen	TV series
1991–1998	Step by Step	Karen Foster	Series regular, 160 episodes
1992	ABC TGIF	Karen Foster	TV special, 1 episode
1994	Duckman: Private Dick/Family Man	Deanna (voice)	Guest role, 1 episode
1994	ABC Sneak Peek with Step by Step	Karen Foster	TV movie special
2005	Final Approach	Milly	Direct-to-video
2007	Cowboys and Indians	Mom	Short film

Her breakout role was as Karen Foster on Step by Step, a sitcom that aired on ABC and later CBS. Watson appeared throughout the show's seven-season run.

After the series ended in 1998, she acted sporadically, including in Final Approach (2005) and Cowboys and Indians (2007). In 2020, she performed in a Florida stage production of The Living Room.

=== Advocacy ===
In the 2000s, Watson discovered that much of her child-acting earnings had been mismanaged. She later founded the nonprofit CAST (Child Actors Supporting Themselves), which supports young performers in protecting and managing their finances.

== Personal life ==
Watson married actor Brian Nahas on February 23, 2020.

On June 22, 2024, at age 48, she gave birth to her first child, a son. He was born with a congenital heart defect and required intensive medical care and multiple surgeries. Watson and her husband have described him as their "miracle baby."

== Later appearances ==
Watson has reunited with her Step by Step castmates at fan conventions, including a 2024 reunion. She maintains a modest social media presence where she shares updates about her family and advocates for pediatric health awareness.
