= List of Sabrina the Teenage Witch episodes =

This is an episode list for Sabrina the Teenage Witch, an American sitcom that debuted on ABC in 1996. From Season 5, the program was aired on The WB. The series ran for seven seasons totaling 163 episodes. It originally premiered on September 27, 1996, on ABC and ended on April 24, 2003, on The WB.

== Series overview ==
Season	Episodes	Originally released			Rank	Viewers (millions)
Season	Episodes	First released	Last released	Network	Rank	Viewers (millions)
1	24	September 27, 1996	May 16, 1997	ABC	41	9.3
2	26	September 26, 1997	May 15, 1998	ABC	41	12.5
3	25	September 25, 1998	May 21, 1999	ABC	41	12.2
4	22	September 24, 1999	May 5, 2000	ABC	57	10.2
5	22	September 22, 2000	May 18, 2001	The WB	124	3.8
6	22	October 5, 2001	May 10, 2002	The WB	140	3.1
7	22	September 20, 2002	April 24, 2003	The WB	146	3.0
Films		April 7, 1996	September 26, 1999	Showtime; ABC	—N/a	—N/a

== Episodes ==
=== Season 1 (1996–1997) ===
No. overall	No. in season	Title	Directed by	Written by	Original release date	Prod. code	U.S. viewers (millions)
1	1	"Pilot"	Robby Benson	Story by : Barney Cohen & Kathryn Wallack; Teleplay by : Nell Scovell	September 27, 1996	001	17.2
On her 16th birthday, Sabrina Spellman discovers she's born with extremely powerful magic when her Aunt Hilda and Aunt Zelda inform her that she is a witch by giving her a spellbook and revealing that their cat, Salem, can speak. This shocking news is coupled with Sabrina having an extremely bad first day at her new high school, culminating in her turning cheerleader/"mean girl" Libby into a pineapple. With some help from Aunt Hilda, Sabrina gets to rewind time and relive the day, changing things for the better and learning to love magic.
2	2	"Bundt Friday"	Gary Halvorson	Norma Safford Vela	October 4, 1996	002	14.9
Sabrina brings a jar of "truth sprinkles" to cooking class to make Libby tell why she was making up lies about her, but the sprinkles are put on top of the cakes the class made by mistake, causing everyone to say exactly what they think.
3	3	"The True Adventures of Rudy Kazootie"	Gail Mancuso	Carrie Honigblum & Renee Phillips	October 11, 1996	004	14.3
Sabrina babysits in order to earn extra money, but then accidentally casts a spell that transforms her charge, Rudy, into a grown man. She must then hide the truth from Rudy's parents and deal with a full-grown adult that has the mind of a toddler. Special Guest: Randy Travis
4	4	"Terrible Things"	Gary Halvorson	Jon Sherman	October 18, 1996	003	15.8
Sabrina is warned not to use helpful magic because terrible things could happen, but goes against her aunts' and Salem's warning and helps Jenny win a school election, Harvey get to start on the football team, and her teacher Mr. Pool figure out how to turn lead to gold. The last item on this list earns the wrath of Drell, the head of the Witches' Council, and Sabrina must make amends before she is severely punished.
5	5	"A Halloween Story"	Gary Halvorson	Nell Scovell	October 25, 1996	006	16.4
Sabrina is forced to attend a family affair on Halloween, so she sends a clone of herself to a party she was supposed to attend. Unfortunately, the simple-minded clone agrees with everything anyone suggests, which eventually leads to her streaking through Harvey's backyard. Meanwhile, the real Sabrina tries to ditch her snobby cousin Marigold (Robin Riker) and her bratty daughter Amanda (Melissa Joan Hart's real life sister Emily Hart), and later gets a heartwarming surprise when she discovers that as a witch, she can talk to a deceased loved one for an hour on Halloween night.
6	6	"Dream Date"	Gail Mancuso	Rachel Lipman	November 1, 1996	007	15.1
When Libby asks Harvey to the upcoming Fall Formal before Sabrina can, the teenage witch is depressed and decides not to go. Her aunts decide to cheer her up by using "Man-Dough" to literally make her a perfect guy as a date: Chad Corey Dylan (Brian Austin Green), an enthusiastic daredevil rock musician who owns a motorcycle. While Sabrina goes to the dance and tries to sort out her feelings for Harvey, Hilda and Zelda have some fun by making dream dates of their own.
7	7	"Third Aunt From the Sun"	Gary Halvorson	Nick Bakay	November 8, 1996	008	16.2
Sabrina gets a surprise visit from her Aunt Vesta (Raquel Welch), Hilda and Zelda's older, and much less responsible, sister. Vesta shows Sabrina the fun side of being a witch, and later tricks Hilda and Zelda into letting Sabrina stay with her at the "Pleasure Dome," her home in the Other Realm. When Sabrina discovers that she has the choice to stay in the Other Realm and enjoy her magic forever, she is forced to make a tough decision.
8	8	"Magic Joel"	Peter Baldwin	Nell Scovell & Norma Safford Vela	November 15, 1996	009	15.6
When a trick involving teen magician Joel disappearing goes awry, Sabrina quickly casts a spell to save them both from embarrassment but ends up turning Joel completely invisible.
9	9	"Geek Like Me"	Gary Halvorson	Rachel Lipman	November 22, 1996	005	15.6
Sabrina, tired with Libby's constant teasing, turns her into a nerd to show her what it feels like to be picked on. But instead of learning a lesson, Libby shows her true colors and takes over the Science Club, making them into a group of jerky teens who look down on everyone else (just like her old cheerleading squad). To solve the problem, Sabrina uses a similar spell to turn the whole student body into nerds, keeping Libby from enjoying her prestigious position.
10	10	"Sweet and Sour Victory"	Robby Benson	Neal Boushell & Sam O'Neal	December 6, 1996	010	13.9
Mr. Pool enters Sabrina into a Kung Fu competition, where she defeats the standing champion by using magic. But when her trophy starts calling her a cheater, she gives the previous champion a rematch so he can get the honor he deserves. Meanwhile, Aunt Hilda meets her long-time rival Gustav while trying out for the local symphony. Special Guest: Cary-Hiroyuki Tagawa
11	11	"A Girl and Her Cat"	Brian K. Roberts	Frank Conniff	December 13, 1996	011	16.0
Sabrina's cat Salem sneaks into her backpack so he can go to the local pizzeria, but then is taken home by a little boy who won't give him up. This episode reunites Melissa Joan Hart with her former Clarissa Explains It All costar Joe O'Connor.
12	12	"Trial by Fury"	Peter Baldwin	Nell Scovell & Norma Safford Vela	January 3, 1997	013	15.11
A rude and condescending math teacher punishes Sabrina for asking a question by giving the whole class a difficult test. When Sabrina does poorly, both Hilda and Zelda try to reason with him--and fail. They become equally annoyed and use their powers to conjure up an Other Realm judge to punish him for his nastiness.
13	13	"Jenny's Non-Dream"	Chuck Vinson	Jon Sherman	January 10, 1997	012	16.22
When Jenny wonders why Sabrina never invites her over to the Spellman house, Sabrina agrees to have her over for a slumber party. Hilda and Zelda do their best to keep magical shenanigans from occurring (a difficult task--there's a lint gremlin hiding in the dryer and a repairman with a tail trying to flush him out), only for Jenny to inadvertently stumble into the Other Realm through the upstairs linen closet. When Drell transforms Jenny into a grasshopper for entering "his" world, the Spellmans team up with the Other Realm's Rule Keeper to get her back. Special Guest: Jack Wagner
14	14	"Sabrina Through the Looking Glass"	Liz Plonka	Nell Scovell	January 17, 1997	014	16.53
After having a rough day (compounded by a massive wart appearing on her forehead), Sabrina escapes into the mirror in her room to get some peace and quiet. But when she wants to leave, she discovers that her bad mood has sealed her within the mirror world, where everyone is as grouchy and grumpy as her. With some magical help from Brady Anderson, Sabrina works to cheer up her mirrored friends and family.
15	15	"Hilda and Zelda: The Teenage Years"	Peter Baldwin	Nell Scovell	January 31, 1997	015	15.34
Harvey invites Sabrina, Jenny, Libby, and Gordie to come with him to Boston and meet The Violent Femmes. Hilda and Zelda are reluctant to let Sabrina go alone, so they make themselves into teenagers named "Hillary" and "Zellery" to chaperone the trip. Problems arise when Gordie falls for Zellery, Hillary fights with a security guard, and Libby tries to tempt Sabrina into disobeying her aunts' rules to make herself cooler.
16	16	"Mars Attracts!"	Gary Halvorson	Nell Scovell	February 7, 1997	016	15.26
Sabrina goes off to a skiing trip on Mars and forgets about Harvey after meeting a cute skiing instructor.
17	17	"First Kiss"	Robby Benson	Carrie Honigblum & Renee Phillips	February 14, 1997	018	14.75
Sabrina and Harvey nearly share their first kiss, only for Salem to warn her that when a witch kisses a mortal, the mortal is transformed into a frog. As a half-mortal, Sabrina hopes that the curse won't happen, and risks kissing Harvey, only for him to turn into an amphibian anyway. To save Harvey, Sabrina, Hilda, and Zelda travel to the Other Realm, where Drell makes Sabrina go through the Three Tests of True Love to prove her feelings for Harvey are real.
18	18	"Sweet Charity"	Peter Baldwin	Nell Scovell	March 7, 1997	017	15.20
Jenny and Sabrina are having trouble getting volunteers for their Adopt-a-Grandparent program until Sabrina transforms herself into Libby when a school photographer comes to the local nursing home to take some pictures. More problems arise when Libby, now forced to participate, "steals" Sabrina's new Nana for herself.
19	19	"Cat Showdown"	David Grossman	Frank Conniff	March 21, 1997	020	15.26
Sabrina and Salem find themselves short on cash, and decide to enter Salem in a cat show to win the $500 first prize for themselves. However, Salem soon discovers that the judge, a local anchorman, is being blackmailed with incriminating photos. He and Sabrina then team up to find the blackmailer and keep the cat show fair. Special Guests: Dann Florek, Bill Fagerbakke
20	20	"Meeting Dad's Girlfriend"	David Grossman	Story by : Sheldon Bull & Nell Scovell; Teleplay by : Nell Scovell	April 4, 1997	019	14.05
Sabrina is not thrilled about meeting her father's new girlfriend.
21	21	"As Westbridge Turns"	Gary Halvorson	Nick Bakay	April 25, 1997	021	12.0
When Sabrina becomes bored with her life, her Aunt Hilda helps her cast a "Can of Worms" spell that turns all of Westbridge into a melodramatic soap opera. While the changes are fun at first, things soon become dangerous: Libby both steals an amnesiac Harvey from Sabrina and frames her for a theft, Mr. Pool's romance with the school nurse goes horribly awry, Jenny plots a dangerous revenge on Libby, and a mysterious (and hunky) one-eyed janitor talks of his dark past. Sabrina must tie all of the plotlines together into a dramatic climax to break the spell.
22	22	"The Great Mistake"	Gary Halvorson	Jon Sherman	May 2, 1997	022	13.19
Hilda and Zelda tell their niece about all the lapses in judgment they've made when she begins to shrink after sneaking out when she was grounded.
23	23	"The Crucible"	Gary Halvorson	Story by : Nell Scovell; Teleplay by : Nell Scovell & Jon Sherman	May 9, 1997	023	13.16
On a class field trip to Salem, all the students at Westbridge are told to act like townsfolk from the past, reenacting the Salem witch trials. When a jealous Libby sees Jenny speaking with her latest crush, she accuses Jenny of being a witch. Sabrina steps in to defend her, only to be accused of witchcraft herself. Hilda and Zelda insist that she solve the problem on her own, prompting Sabrina to discover an odd way to do so. Special Guest: Kevin Nash
24	24	"Troll Bride"	Peter Baldwin	Nick Bakay & Frank Conniff	May 16, 1997	024	12.64
Harvey and Sabrina are voted the yearbook's "cutest couple", but the honor appears to come with a curse of breaking up. Sabrina attempts to disprove the curse, only for trouble to arise when Roland (Phil Fondacaro), a troll who helped her find a lost math book, claims her hand in marriage as payment and spirits her away to the Other Realm. With some help from a magical lawyer (Bryan Cranston), Hilda and Zelda discover that a prince must save Sabrina--and as Harvey's father is the local "Termite King," the younger Kinkle fits the bill. Note: Final appearance of Michelle Beaudoin as Jennifer Kelly and Paul Feig as Mr. Pool.

=== Season 2 (1997–1998) ===
No. overall	No. in season	Title	Directed by	Written by	Original release date	Prod. code	U.S. viewers (millions)
25	1	"Sabrina Gets Her License: Parts 1 & 2"	Gary Halvorson	Miriam Trogdon (part 1); Carrie Honigblum & Renee Phillips (part 2)	September 26, 1997	025	12.64
26	2	"Sabrina Gets Her License: Parts 1 & 2"	Gary Halvorson	Miriam Trogdon (part 1); Carrie Honigblum & Renee Phillips (part 2)	September 26, 1997	026	12.64
On her 17th birthday, Sabrina finds herself overwhelmed with school, her boyfriend Harvey, and having to study for her witch's license with the help of her zany Quizmaster. Despite her struggles, she manages to make a new friend--Valerie, a somewhat pathetic girl--and find love again. Due to her lack of studying, Sabrina fails her first quiz for her license. As a penalty, Sabrina must attend "Witch Camp", a boot camp for witches. Not wanting to miss a school dance honoring Harvey and the football team, she struggles (and manages) to escape.
27	3	"Dummy for Love"	Gary Halvorson	Holly Hester	October 3, 1997	027	11.35
Sabrina has trouble with Mr. Kraft, Westbridge's new vice principal, until she discovers that he has a crush on her Aunt Hilda. Hilda isn't crazy about Willard, so Sabrina uses magic to control her aunt on a date in the hope of getting Mr. Kraft to ease up on her.
28	4	"Dante's Inferno"	Gary Halvorson	Charlie Tercek	October 10, 1997	028	12.33
Harvey's father and Sabrina's aunts decide the pair need to try dating other people. Hilda and Zelda set Sabrina up with a witch, Dante (Jason James Richter). Though the two hit it off, Sabrina discovers that Dante is prejudiced against mortals; problems arise when they double-date with Harvey and his new girlfriend, and Dante uses his powers to embarrass Harvey. Meanwhile, Hilda is struck with "punnitis," a disease that transforms every idiom or compound phrase she uses into reality--including Davy Jones appearing as a "Monkee on her back."
29	5	"A Doll's Story"	Brian K. Roberts	Carrie Honigblum & Renee Phillips	October 17, 1997	029	12.34
When Sabrina volunteers to babysit her bratty cousin Amanda, she finds herself struggling against Amanda's whiny ways. When Amanda doesn't get what she wants, she transforms Sabrina into a doll and locks her in a toy box with other people who have suffered a similar fate. The Quizmaster challenges Sabrina to get everyone out of the box without using magic. Meanwhile, Hilda and Zelda book a vacation at an Other Realm spa in an effort to get some time away from each other.
30	6	"Sabrina, the Teenage Boy"	Peter Baldwin	Nick Bakay	October 24, 1997	030	11.83
Sabrina turns herself into a boy to see what Harvey is like around other guys. Meanwhile, Aunt Hilda becomes a biker in order to scare off Mr. Kraft.
31	7	"A River of Candy Corn Runs Through It"	Gary Halvorson	Frank Conniff	October 31, 1997	031	10.90
Libby brags about her upcoming Halloween party, prompting Valerie to make similar claims about an even cooler party at the Spellman house. Hilda and Zelda agree to host the party, but Sabrina is still nervous--especially when a new set of talking furniture arrives, monstrous Other Realm "Halloween carolers" come to visit, and Hilda inadvertently cooks too much candy corn. Just when it seems Sabrina's party will be ruined, she realizes that all of her friends think the "magic" effects are fake, and takes advantage of their confusion to host the best party ever--including an appearance from 10,000 Maniacs.
32	8	"Inna Gadda Sabrina"	Gary Halvorson	Sheldon Bull	November 7, 1997	032	13.62
Sabrina has college on her mind, and is excited when a career counselor tells her she has many options available. Later, Salem swallows a magical item called a "time ball" that transports Westbridge back to 1967 (the 1960s). At first, Sabrina is thrilled to see an era where education is much more free-form and protests have instantaneous effects--but when she discovers that women are still badly oppressed in the 60s, she wants to return home. This episode kicks off a time-travel themed crossover event with Boy Meets World, You Wish and Teen Angel that continues on "No Guts, No Cory" and "Genie Without a Cause" and concludes on "One Dog Night".
33	9	"Witch Trash"	Peter Baldwin	Nick Bakay & Robin Bakay	November 14, 1997	033	12.45
The Spellmans get a surprise visit from their hillbilly cousins Racine (Loni Anderson), Boyd (Gary Grubbs), and Maw-Maw (Edie McClurg). Though Hilda and Zelda are less than friendly, Sabrina tries to get along with them--until she inadvertently admits that the Magic Book, a Spellman family heirloom, is now hers. A furious Racine demands the Book and, when she doesn't get it, uses her powers to seal the Spellman house, trapping everyone--including Harvey and Valerie--inside. After some magical warfare, Great-Grandma Spellman (Alice Ghostley) intervenes and settles the feud.
34	10	"To Tell a Mortal"	Peter Baldwin	Carrie Honigblum & Renee Phillips	November 21, 1997	034	13.38
When Sabrina learns that she is free to tell mortals her secret (as they automatically forget at midnight) on Friday the 13th, she is excited--until her aunts warn her that they have faced problems in telling their own friends. Sabrina risks telling Valerie, who is completely taken with the idea--to the point where she tells Harvey, and an eavesdropping Libby, as well. Sabrina is thrilled to discover that her friends are accepting of her, and leads them on a day of magical fun that she, at least, will never forget. It becomes especially memorable when Libby tries to expose Sabrina's secret to the world, forcing Valerie to choose between her best friend and the popularity she's always wanted.
35	11	"Oh What a Tangled Spell She Weaves"	David Trainer	Joan Binder & David Weiss	December 5, 1997	035	13.06
Sabrina becomes heavily reliant on "do-overs," spells that automatically clean up problematic magic. The Quizmaster removes Sabrina's ability to use those charms and instead insists that she use her magic with forethought, rather than waiting to settle problems. Sabrina's shortcut-taking leads to problems when she conjures a blizzard in school, transforms Harvey into a musclebound hulk, and traps her aunts in Merlin's (Bobcat Goldthwaite) castle.
36	12	"Sabrina Claus"	Kenneth R. Koch	Charlie Tercek	December 19, 1997	036	11.99
With Christmas coming, Sabrina becomes exceptionally greedy, prompting her to develop a case of "Egotitis," a disease which keeps her from receiving any presents. To help, Hilda and Zelda summon their old friend Bob (John Ratzenberger) to get Sabrina into the spirit of giving. But when Sabrina injures Bob, she discovers that he is actually Santa Claus. It falls to her to save Christmas from being a disaster while Hilda and Zelda tend to Santa (and his incredible appetite).
37	13	"Little Big Kraft"	David Trainer	Barney Cohen & Kathryn Wallack	January 9, 1998	037	13.74
When Mr. Kraft announces that he will be chaperoning the Westbridge High ski trip, Sabrina wishes that he was more fun, and uses Zelda's "lab-top" potion making system (against her orders) to create an elixir that will make him think like a teenager. Though this initially seems like an improvement, Sabrina forgets to limit the spell's effects, which gradually reduce Mr. Kraft's mental state to that of a cranky toddler.
38	14	"Five Easy Pieces of Libby"	Gary Halvorson	Frank Conniff	January 23, 1998	038	13.50
Mrs. Quick assigns Sabrina and Libby to decorate the school's "Democracy Day" float together, but Libby's obnoxiousness causes Sabrina to cast a spell keeping her a safe distance away from her. The Quizmaster punishes Sabrina by reversing the charm, binding the two to stay within a foot of each other. When Sabrina can no longer take this, she pulls away and unwittingly turns Libby into a puzzle with pieces missing, forcing her to go on a quest to put the cheerleader back together before it's too late.
39	15	"Finger Lickin' Flu"	Gary Halvorson	Frank Conniff	January 30, 1998	039	14.35
Sabrina comes down with a case of finger flu that causes her magic to malfunction just when Mr. Kraft announces a plan to fire Westbridge's lunch ladies and use students to serve food instead. Her aunts demand that she stay home from school, but when she has a vision of Valerie and Harvey being attacked for poor service, she sneaks out to help--and inadvertently transfers her powers to Mrs. Quick, who in turn transforms Mr. Kraft into a chimpanzee. The Spellmans must brave a trip to a literal "witch doctor" to solve their problems.
40	16	"Sabrina and the Beanstalk"	Peter Baldwin	Carrie Honigblum & Renee Phillips	February 6, 1998	040	13.46
Harvey and Sabrina can't stop procrastinating on their schoolwork, so Sabrina tries to conjure up some magical jumping beans that will keep her focused. But when the recipe goes wrong through her use of shortcuts, Harvey finds himself whisked up a beanstalk, where the beautiful but deadly Wicked Witch (Shelley Long) proceeds to fatten him up for her next meal. While Hilda and Zelda go to the "Yikes! Magical Crisis Agency" to solve the problem, Sabrina risks a trip into the clouds to save Harvey herself.
41	17	"The Equalizer"	Linda Day	Alexandra Komisaruk & Pamela Soper	February 13, 1998	041	13.01
Roland returns, still determined to win Sabrina's love, but now he is the Equalizer, empowered to magically balance reality whenever Sabrina takes something for free take something from her. When Sabrina tries to help Valerie attract the attention of brash but apparently uninterested Ken, Sabrina accidentally steals his heart, Roland uses his authority to steal Sabrina's heart, making Sabrina fall madly in love with him and take her to his home in the Other Realm.
42	18	"The Band Episode"	Peter Baldwin	Nick Bakay	February 27, 1998	042	14.11
Sabrina brews up talent-producing soda for a school's battle of the bands competition after Harvey signs their band with Valerie to compete against Libby. Though the trio is a smash hit, they find their newfound fame and egos getting in the way of their friendship, especially when the talent-creating soda goes flat and loses its power. At the episode's end, a group of teenagers (Backstreet Boys) find the last bottle of soda and inadvertently become superstars by drinking it.
43	19	"When Teens Collide"	Gary Halvorson	Sheldon Bull	March 6, 1998	047	13.86
Due to molecular instability caused by sunspots, Sabrina and Libby swap personalities.
44	20	"My Nightmare, the Car"	Peter Baldwin	Charlie Tercek	March 20, 1998	043	12.89
When Sabrina's aunts and Valerie's parents refuse to buy the girls their own cars, they come up with an idea to pool their money to buy one themselves only to later realize how they might not be so responsible after all. The car (voiced by Buddy Hackett) talks.
45	21	"Fear Strikes Up a Conversation"	Chuck Vinson	Frank Conniff	April 3, 1998	045	12.87
Sabrina is chosen to read her award-winning paper on mathematics aloud to the entire school. When she develops a bad case of stage fright, she uses magic to separate her fear from her body--but the emotion becomes a living shadow and follows her to Westbridge, where it makes everyone who comes near it deathly afraid of everything. To reverse the spell and save her friends, Sabrina is forced to travel to the Forest of Fear and face incarnations of her biggest phobias, including fear itself (Steve Allen).
46	22	"Quiz Show"	Tibor Takács	Holly Hester	April 17, 1998	044	11.87
When Sabrina inadvertently complains about her Quizmaster's teaching methods to a woman who turns out to be his boss, the Witches' Council rules that he be reassigned to a new pupil, the obnoxious Ralph.
47	23	"Disneyworld"	David Trainer	David Lesser	April 24, 1998	049	12.56
A field trip to Disney's Animal Kingdom goes awry for Sabrina when Libby starts hanging out with Valerie in an attempt to get closer to Harvey (which Aunt Hilda tries to help by changing Harvey into a guide on the Kilimanjaro Safaris attraction). The problems only become more beastly when Sabrina must create an animal transformation potion for a Witch's License test, only for Libby and Valerie to drink it and turn into zebras. Meanwhile, Zelda unearths the bones of a Neanderthal man in the park's Dinoland, and accidentally brings him back to life when she tries to learn more about him.
48	24	"Sabrina's Choice"	Kenneth R. Koch	Sheldon Bull	May 1, 1998	050	11.67
When Sabrina plays one aunt against the other to get her way, Hilda and Zelda decide it's in Sabrina's best interest if they live in separate homes and Sabrina has to choose between them.
49	25	"Rumor Mill"	Paul Hoen	Nick Bakay	May 8, 1998	046	10.80
Tricked in the Other Realm into thinking that spreading false rumors is a community service, Sabrina and new friend Dashiell (Donald Faison) start telling absurd tales out of school, unaware that their fibs will come literally true in the mortal realm. Meanwhile, the two storytellers start falling for each other, causing Sabrina to question the depth of her true feelings for Harvey
50	26	"Mom vs. Magic"	Linda Day	Sheldon Bull	May 15, 1998	048	12.75
Sabrina must renounce one of the two things she holds most dear. The dreadful dilemma develops when she must decide whether to date Harvey or new love Dashiell. She needs advice, but her loved ones are busy celebrating Mother's Day, leaving lonely Sabrina longing for her mom's guidance. She chooses to write to her mother for help but soon learns that there can be no contact whatsoever between them. As a result, Sabrina must choose between her mom and her magic. Note: Final Appearance: Alimi Ballard as Quizmaster

=== Season 3 (1998–1999) ===
No. overall	No. in season	Title	Directed by	Written by	Original release date	Prod. code	U.S. viewers (millions)
51	1	"It's a Mad Mad Mad Mad Season Opener"	Linda Day	Holly Hester	September 25, 1998	051	14.12
Sabrina finally earns her witch's license, but now must uncover her family secret before she can use it. Meanwhile, her romantic dilemma continues.
52	2	"Boy Was My Face Red"	David Trainer	Carrie Honigblum & Renee Phillips	October 2, 1998	052	13.22
After Valerie burps in front of a boy she likes, not to mention most of the student body, Sabrina concocts a spell in order to help her friend Valerie out of the extremely embarrassing situation. But the spells backfires, displacing the embarrassment from Valerie and literally leaving Sabrina's own face bright red. Meanwhile, Salem learns if someone he truly loves kisses him, he will turn back into a man. He seeks out his new veterinarian as his target.
53	3	"Suspicious Minds"	Linda Day	Dan Berendsen	October 9, 1998	053	12.92
In a class assignment where students pretend to be married, Sabrina is paired with Gordy while Harvey ends up with Libby. Suspicious and jealous, Sabrina hires "private investigator" Roland to spy on them, but the lovesick troll makes things even worse by trying to break up Harvey and Sabrina.
54	4	"The Pom Pom Incident"	Kim Friedman	Charlie Tercek	October 16, 1998	054	13.20
Valerie decides to try out for the dreaded cheerleading squad, and Sabrina fears she will become just as mean as Libby. Her problems are compounded when her cousin Mortimer (Dom DeLuise), a "witchigian" who uses his real magic to perform birthday parties for mortal children, arrives to give her the first clue to the family secret. At Mortimer's urging, Sabrina uses a magic coin to forcibly persuade Valerie to change her mind, but her actions end up having surprising consequences.
55	5	"Pancake Madness"	Mark Cendrowski	Sheldon Bull	October 23, 1998	055	13.09
After Sabrina conjures up some pancakes for breakfast, her aunts warn her that the Spellmans carry a predilection for flapjack addiction. She ignores their warnings and ends up hooked on pancakes, leading to an intense detoxification after she makes a fool of herself at a school breakfast. Meanwhile, the Witch Immigration Center discovers that Hilda did not file the proper paperwork to live in the mortal world, forcing Zelda to mount a rescue in the frozen north of the Other Realm. Martin Mull is absent in this episode.
56	6	"Good Will Haunting"	Kenneth R. Koch	Carrie Honigblum & Renee Phillips	October 30, 1998	056	13.42
Sabrina is given an evil doll named Molly Dolly that proceeds to terrorize her friends. Hilda and Zelda are trapped at a party in an insane asylum. Gary Owens and the rest of the surviving Laugh-In cast members are the guests.
57	7	"You Bet Your Family"	David Trainer	Nick Bakay	November 6, 1998	057	15.46
Salem loses a big poker game in the Other Realm, and as a result of a bet, Hilda, Zelda, and Sabrina become powerless servants for the next twenty years.
58	8	"And the Sabrina Goes To..."	Kenneth R. Koch	Frank Conniff	November 13, 1998	058	13.00
Annoyed that no one pays attention to her achievements, Sabrina cooks up a spell in the form of a cake, and is showered with compliments. But hungry for even more praise, she eats the whole cake and gets praised for every little thing she does. Note: Caroline Rhea is absent in this episode.
59	9	"Nobody Nose Libby Like Sabrina Nose Libby"	Linda Day	Sheldon Krasner & David Saling	November 20, 1998	059	12.33
Salem and Sabrina wind up inside a tiny spaceship that accidentally flies up Libby's nose, eventually getting stuck inside her brain. Meanwhile, Hilda tries to break up Zelda and Mr. Kraft by giving Zelda some magic chocolates that cause Zelda to find Mr. Kraft annoying.
60	10	"Sabrina and the Beast"	Sheldon Bull	Danita Jones	November 27, 1998	060	10.66
Sabrina's cousin Suzy comes to visit with the latest clue to the family secret. Though Suzy is a saintly person, she looks like a stereotypical wicked witch, and Sabrina can't hide her distaste. To teach Sabrina a lesson about judging by appearances, Suzy gradually transforms Harvey into a hideously ugly beast.
61	11	"Christmas Amnesia"	Kenneth R. Koch	Frank Conniff	December 11, 1998	061	13.40
At a trendy party in the Other Realm, Sabrina accidentally erases Christmas in the mortal world and must figure out a way to restore the holiday. Guest star: Daveigh Chase.
62	12	"Whose So-Called Life Is It Anyway?"	Linda Day	Charlie Tercek	January 8, 1999	062	14.98
A warning against using charitable magic coincides with Valerie inviting Sabrina to dinner at her house. The Birkheads turn out to be incredibly dull, so a desperate Sabrina casts a small spell to make a wishbone's wish come true for Mrs. Birkhead. But when she reveals that she wished for Valerie to be "just like Sabrina," Valerie slowly starts transforming into an exact duplicate of the witch, and Sabrina must undo the charm before the real Valerie is lost forever.
63	13	"What Price Harvey?"	Gary Halvorson	Frank Conniff	January 15, 1999	063	13.76
Sabrina is upset when Harvey tells her that he plans to go to trade school to be a mechanic rather than getting a college degree. The visiting cousin Zsa Zsa, who hawks magical beauty products, offers Sabrina the "Ambition" line of men's goods to broaden Harvey's dreams. But when Sabrina goes overboard, Harvey becomes a ruthless business tycoon who plans to take over the entirety of Westbridge. Meanwhile, Hilda and Zelda swap personalities after trying out Zsa Zsa's "Mile in My Moccasins."
64	14	"Mrs. Kraft"	Gary Halvorson	Nick Bakay	January 29, 1999	064	13.38
Sabrina is tired of Mr. Kraft hanging around the house so she tracks down his ex-wife (Julia Duffy) in hopes of Zelda and Mr. Kraft breaking up. They find out that she is a witch, and the two women end up fighting for his affections on The Jerry Springer Show. Special Guest: Jerry Springer
65	15	"Sabrina and the Pirates"	Gary Halvorson	Miriam Trogdon	February 5, 1999	065	13.06
Sabrina longs to go to a nightclub, especially when she learns NSYNC will be performing there, but it is only for adults. She obtains some fake IDs in the Other Realm for herself and Valerie, but the plan goes awry when her magic becomes just as phony as the licenses. The problems are compounded when Hilda and Zelda, who have sent off their own powers for a checkup, discover a group of unruly magical pirates in the basement and are forced to acclimate them to the twentieth century.
66	16	"Sabrina, the Matchmaker"	Gary Halvorson	Story by : Paula Hart & Eric Schlecht and Dan Berendsen; Teleplay by : Dan Berendsen	February 12, 1999	066	12.79
Ordered by Cupid to help two people fall in love, Sabrina gets her cousin (Hallie Todd) and the plumber (Brian Cousins) together. However, her cousin's bratty daughters try to ruin it. Note: This episode was a backdoor pilot for a spin-off featuring Melissa Joan Hart's younger sisters (Emily Hart and Alexandra Hart-Gilliams), but was not picked up to series by ABC. Special guest: Frankie Muniz as Angelo
67	17	"Salem, the Boy"	Gary Halvorson	Nick Bakay	February 19, 1999	067	13.96
Sabrina allows Salem to inhabit the body of a classmate, but things get out of hand when the feline once again attempts to take over the world.
68	18	"Sabrina, the Teenage Writer"	Gary Halvorson	Sheldon Bull	February 26, 1999	068	12.07
The line between real and imaginary begins to blur when Sabrina types a story on a magic typewriter and the characters come to life.
69	19	"The Big Sleep"	Kenneth R. Koch	Sheldon Bull	March 12, 1999	072	13.72
After Sabrina disturbs Aunt Dorma, who takes ten-year naps, the Spellman house is filled with sleep-inducing poppies.
70	20	"Sabrina's Pen Pal"	Gary Halvorson	Story by : Tina Weiss; Teleplay by : Kelly Baker & Danita Jones	March 12, 1999	071	13.72
Sabrina sneaks her timid pen pal over from the Other Realm in the guise of a cat, but then discovers she is actually a dangerous jewel thief.
71	21	"Sabrina's Real World"	Gary Halvorson	Charlie Tercek	April 9, 1999	073	7.89
After Salem signs a contract with a television producer from the Other Realm, cameras are put in the household and Sabrina's life becomes a reality show.
72	22	"The Long and Winding Shortcut"	Gary Halvorson	Carrie Honigblum & Renee Phillips	April 30, 1999	069	10.91
By using Mrs. Quick to help solve the family secret, Sabrina is accused of cheating and is stripped of modern conveniences.
73	23	"Sabrina, the Sandman"	Gary Halvorson	Dan Berendsen	May 7, 1999	070	9.81
Sabrina gets a job as the Sandman, but she becomes confused and upset when she starts peeking in on their dreams. Meanwhile, Hilda and Zelda find ways to motivate Sabrina into solving the family secret.
74	24	"Silent Movie"	Linda Day	Carrie Honigblum & Renee Phillips	May 14, 1999	074	10.55
Just as Harvey professes his love to Sabrina, a silence spell kicks in. When the entire household turns into an old silent film, Sabrina can't respond. Note: This episode marks the final appearance of Lindsay Sloane as Valerie Birkhead and Jenna Leigh Green as Libby Chessler (aside from a flashback in the season finale).
75	25	"The Good, the Bad, and the Luau"	Linda Day	Nancy Cohen	May 21, 1999	075	9.01
Sabrina travels to Hawaii with her aunts, where she finally solves the family secret: every member of the Spellman family is born with a twin. A tribunal then decides which Spellman, Sabrina or her twin Katrina, is the good witch (through various tests and evaluations), with serious consequences for the twin deemed the evil witch. Meanwhile, back home, Harvey's mom and Lola, a stray cat found by Salem, are both about to give birth.

=== Season 4 (1999–2000) ===
No. overall	No. in season	Title	Directed by	Written by	Original release date	Prod. code	U.S. viewers (millions)
76	1	"No Place Like Home"	Linda Day	Dan Berendsen	September 24, 1999	076	11.30
On her 18th birthday, Sabrina's father asks her to move to Paris. Now that Libby has gone to a private school, and Valerie has moved to Alaska with her parents, an anxious Sabrina becomes convinced that Harvey and her aunts don't really care for her, and sets out for her new life in France. When Salem gets heartbroken he decides to start a Civil War on Pluto so Sabrina will come to her senses and return home to him and Hilda and Zelda, where she belongs. Notes: First appearance of Jon Huertas as Brad Alcerro. During the ending credits, the music video for "(You Drive Me) Crazy" is shown. Guest Star: Britney Spears
77	2	"Dream a Little Dreama Me"	Linda Day	Sheldon Bull	October 1, 1999	077	10.41
Sabrina discovers she must tutor apprentice witch Dreama-an accident-prone girl a little too fond of trying out magic while in the Mortal Realm-or risk banishment. The assignment is made more dangerous by Harvey's old friend Brad, who is unknowingly a born witch-hunter. Meanwhile, a bored Hilda gives up the violin and impulsively purchases a magic clock shop. Note: First appearance of China Jesuita Shavers as Dreama.
78	3	"Jealousy"	Jeff Melman	Frank Conniff	October 8, 1999	078	10.99
When Sabrina has Harvey write a Basketball article for the school newspaper, she starts to feel left out when he asks Brad to help him with it. To make matters worse, she can't share her problems with Valerie since she rarely calls anymore. Sabrina then starts to percolate with jealousy since Harvey is spending a lot of time hanging out with Brad and Dreama isn't around to spend time with her. As a result, Sabrina develops jealitosis, a condition that causes jealousy to get out of control. Sabrina then ignores her aunt's warnings to be happy for the people she's jealous of and ultimately ends up in the "Jealous Sea" where Salem helps her realize that while she can be happy for other people, it won't diminish what she has. While Sabrina is dealing with her jealousy, Mr. Kraft becomes more irritable than usual when he finds out his brother Wally is coming to visit him. Note: Salem says he needs to complain about Nick Bakay's constant talk of the Buffalo Bills (In which he would complain about himself as Bakay provides his voice)
79	4	"Little Orphan Hilda"	Tom Cherones	Nick Bakay	October 15, 1999	079	10.04
When Sabrina asks Hilda and Zelda if Grandma Spellman can come to visit, they start acting rather unenthusiastically at the prospect of their mother's visit. After about five minutes of visiting with their mother, Hilda and Zelda escape to the clock shop to avoid their mother's nagging. Things get worse for them when Sabrina accidentally lets it slip to Grandma that Hilda gave up playing the violin to buy her shop, and that Hilda and Zelda are actually adopted. When Sabrina realizes she is the reason her aunts lost their sense of self, she takes it upon herself to learn the identity of Hilda and Zelda's biological parents.
80	5	"Spoiled Rotten"	Linda Day	Dan Berendsen	October 22, 1999	080	9.46
As the businesses on Water Street organize a charity drive to help the citizens of Honduras, Sabrina gets her first credit card from the Other Realm and starts buying things like crazy. She then ignores Zelda and Hilda's warnings that buying anything she wants without having to pay for it and ultimately catches "Getititis." Things get worse for Sabrina when she finds out that she has become spoiled rotten after she donates her aunt's magical mementos to the high school's rummage sale. In order to fix her problem before she becomes slimy ooze, Sabrina has to get back all the things that got sold at the rummage sale. Meanwhile, Salem has his paws full when he adopts a "DogMan" from the Other Realm.
81	6	"Episode LXXXI: The Phantom Menace"	Kenneth R. Koch	Charlie Tercek	October 29, 1999	081	10.79
When Sabrina gets a job at a nearby coffee house, she decides to work on Halloween night instead of celebrating the holiday with her aunts. After Hilda and Zelda learn of Sabrina's plans, they try to warn her that she can't run away from Halloween, but Sabrina refuses to take their warning seriously. As Hilda and Zelda anxiously prepare for their Halloween dinner with Edgar Allan Poe, Sabrina and Dreama eventually celebrate the holiday in their own way: when a group of Other Realm Zombies arrive at the coffee house to help them experience the fun of Halloween. Note: First appearance of David Lascher as Josh. When the Zombies arrive at the coffee house, one of them turns on the radio and the song which starts to play is "Larger than Life" by the Backstreet Boys.
82	7	"Prelude to a Kiss"	Dinah Manoff	Betsy Borns	November 5, 1999	082	10.55
While Sabrina and Dreama talk about the crush she has on Josh, Sabrina finds herself in a sticky situation of having the opportunity to help Josh with his English homework on the same night of Harvey's football game. As a result, Sabrina asks Dreama if she could go Harvey's game and page her if he gets put in the game. However, after one too many false alarm pages by Dreama, Sabrina turns off her pager, leaving her friend in the tight spot of having to cover for her when Harvey starts looking for her in the stands. When Harvey learns that Sabrina had to rush home, he goes right over to the Spellman's and gets an unpleasant surprise of finding Sabrina kissing Josh. Meanwhile, Hilda and Zelda find themselves overwhelmed by all the work at the Clock Shop that they neglected their chores around the house. As a result, they are forced to hire their old friends the pirates as maids.
83	8	"Aging, Not So Gracefully"	Kenneth R. Koch	Carrie Honigblum & Renee Phillips	November 12, 1999	083	12.57
As Sabrina walks into the coffee house, she tries acting more mature in an attempt to catch Josh's eye. However, when he only sees her as a high school kid, Sabrina decides to look in her magic book to see if there is a spell or magical potion to make her appear older to Josh, and eventually finds a face cream called "Oil of Old Age". At first the cream works great in making Sabrina appear older to Josh, but the more Sabrina uses it, she eventually turns into an elderly woman. After Harvey brings her home, Hilda and Zelda have to take time out of getting feuding scientists Pierre and Marie Curie back together in order to return Sabrina to normal. Meanwhile, Salem comes up with an ill thought out plan to meet Paula Abdul.
84	9	"Love Means Having to Say You're Sorry"	Kenneth R. Koch	Carrie Honigblum & Renee Phillips	November 19, 1999	084	12.12
Since getting caught by Harvey kissing Josh, Sabrina starts to think of ways to get Harvey to forgive her. However, since Harvey started dating another girl, patching things up with him gets difficult for her. At hearing Harvey will be spending Thanksgiving with Colette, Sabrina gets so depressed that she rushes to the clock shop to ask her aunts for advice before going to work. After hearing Harvey wants his stuff back since their break up, Salem starts taking what happened harder than Sabrina, but soon gets comforted when Hilda and Zelda announce their intention of making Thanksgiving dinner to cheer Sabrina up. Eventually, Sabrina and Harvey straighten things out and start dating again. They then share a nice Thanksgiving dinner with Sabrina's aunts and the Pilgrims they conjured up to do the cooking.
85	10	"Ice Station Sabrina"	Jeff Melman	Sheldon Bull	November 21, 1999	085	7.62
When Harvey surprises Sabrina with a romantic weekend skiing in the mountains, she is less than thrilled at the prospect of being driven up to the cabin by Brad. After finding this out, Sabrina starts to panic and asks her aunts what she should do. Hilda and Zelda then decide that Salem should go with the kids so he can tell Sabrina if she could use her magic or not in front of Brad, making him less than thrilled at missing a Western movie marathon on television. However, things don't go as planned when Brad's witch-hunting gene kicks in when she uses her magic to fix his car's heater. As a result, they get stuck in a snowbank on the side of the road. Later, when Brad's father shows up at Hilda and Zelda's to find out about the kids, they decide to go and look for Sabrina, Harvey, and Brad. It is at this time that Hilda and Zelda are able to use their magic to change the weather before Brad is able to identify Sabrina as a witch. The aunts also zap a disappointed Salem back home, where the movie marathon is just ending.
86	11	"Salem and Juliette"	Kenneth R. Koch	Carrie Honigblum & Renee Phillips	December 10, 1999	086	9.61
As Salem unhappily prepares for his upcoming class reunion, Hilda and Zelda have to go to the Other Realm in order to become licensed to run the clock shop. While they're gone, Sabrina and Dreama find the perfect date for Salem to take to his reunion: Dreama's cat Juliette, a former witch who got caught trying to take over the universe. After taking care of that, Sabrina goes to work with Mrs. Quick, trying to uncover a story about the lackluster food being served in the cafeteria and its possible relation to Mr. Kraft's sudden wealth. However, the story falls through when their source claims supernatural events have been going on at school, instead of accusing Mr. Kraft of funneling school money for his personal use.
87	12	"Sabrina, Nipping at Your Nose"	Anson Williams	Frank Conniff	December 17, 1999	087	9.43
With Christmas approaching, Sabrina gets in a bad mood due to the nonstop snowing in Westbridge. When she hears a contest on the radio where the grand prize is a weeklong getaway to Jamaica, Sabrina gets excited when Zelda is able to answer the question for her. However, when the bad weather threatens to leave the Spellman women stranded in town for the holidays, Salem suggests that Sabrina tamper with the weather so they could still make their flight to Jamaica. As a result, Sabrina gets turned into a snowman by Mother Nature in retaliation for changing the weather in Massachusetts. Mother Nature then turns her back to normal, but punishes Sabrina by giving her the task of cheering up Mr. Kraft. As Sabrina gets to work on her task, Salem receives the 12 Days of Christmas while Hilda and Zelda hire a pair of Christmas elves to help out with the holiday rush, only to find out they're little thieves.
88	13	"Now You See Her, Now You Don't"	Sheldon Bull	Charlie Tercek	January 7, 2000	088	10.87
When Sabrina and Harvey are nominated the "cutest couple" at Westbridge High's Winter Ball, she finds the perfect dress for the dance in the Other Realm. However, when Sabrina discovers it is one size too small, Salem encourages her to take diet shakes made in the Other Realm that eventually cause her to disappear. In order to rematerialize in time for the dance, she and Salem order a magical camera that adds 100 pounds, and she has to take it to the dance to avoid disappearing again. It is only after she misplaces her camera that Sabrina disappears again and overhears her classmates say the reason why they voted for her and Harvey was due to how down to earth she is, resulting in Sabrina returning to normal.
89	14	"Super Hero"	Melissa Joan Hart	Nick Bakay	January 21, 2000	089	12.03
It is Career Week at school, and Mr. Kraft is feeling disenfranchised about his life as an educator as a result. After resigning as principal, Zelda encourages him to try something new; Mr. Kraft soon finds his way to a job at the coffee shop where Sabrina works, much to her horror. Wanting to get rid of him, Sabrina turns to Hilda for help, and they concoct a dream-come-true potion to help Mr. Kraft live out his childhood dream. Sabrina's spell works at first, but when Brad accidentally uses it on Harvey, Sabrina has to deal with making her boyfriend live out his dream while helping Mr. Kraft fly to Paris to fulfill his. Note: This episode marks Melissa Joan Hart's Sabrina directorial debut.
90	15	"Love in Bloom"	Jeff Melman	Dan Berendsen	February 11, 2000	092	10.51
Valentine's Day is around the corner when an anonymous valentine arrives at the Spellman home. At first Sabrina and Zelda think it was sent by Harvey or Mr. Kraft, but upon learning it wasn't from them, they conclude that it was sent to Hilda by an admirer. Hoping to cheer Hilda up after having to return Daniel Boone back the past, Sabrina and Zelda rush to give her the good news, only to find out she has been hiding Daniel in the attic. Meanwhile, Sabrina soon comes down with "Candy-Heart Syndrome," causing her aunts to realize that the valentine was sent to her by Josh. As a result, Sabrina has to find a way, with Roland's help, to get Josh to stop vying for her heart before the spell causes her to break up with Harvey. It is during this time that Salem decides to wage war on a neighborhood bird.
91	16	"Welcome Back, Duke"	Kenneth R. Koch	Miriam Trogdon	February 25, 2000	090	10.85
After Salem learns one of his old cronies, Duke (Dick Van Dyke), has completed his sentence as a cat, he asks Hilda and Zelda if Duke can stay with them long enough to get back on his feet. After they reluctantly agree, everybody learns that Duke's magic is quite rusty, and he soon blows up Hilda's clock shop when left in charge. To make matters worse, while Sabrina is practicing for an upcoming school musical, he gives her two right feet and puts a spell on Harvey that makes him act like a child. Hilda and Zelda eventually manage to reverse Duke's spells, thanks to some help from John Salley.
92	17	"Salem's Daughter"	Jeff Melman	Sheldon Bull	March 3, 2000	091	10.48
After Sabrina reads a wedding announcement in the Other Realm newspaper for Annabelle Saberhagen, she asks Salem if he's related to her. Salem admits to being Annabelle's father, and he runs out of the room, heartbroken over the fact he hasn't seen Annabelle in decades. When Sabrina finds Salem, she asks if he would like her to visit the Other Realm to talk to his daughter. After traveling to the Annabelle's house, Sabrina explains to her that Salem would like to mend the rift between them. When Annabelle asks her to be her maid of honor to express her gratitude, Sabrina is too surprised to turn her down. Things then get weird when Sabrina finds out the odd customs that she has to perform as maid of honor in Annabelle's Other Realm wedding. Meanwhile, as Sabrina and her aunts are in the Other Realm for Annabelle's wedding, Harvey gets the idea Sabrina wants to get married when a wedding magazine falls out of her locker. Daniel Boone was intended to be introduced in this episode, and his story was to continue in Love in Bloom, however, the episodes were aired out of order, causing mild confusion. WWF wrestler Billy Gunn made a host appearance as Xavier Prescott, the avenger.
93	18	"Dreama, the Mouse"	Kenneth R. Koch	Charlie Tercek	March 17, 2000	093	10.60
With the annual senior skip day quickly approaching at Westbridge High, Sabrina develops a bad case of spring fever. Having a hard time concentrating in class, she soon gets into a lot of trouble when Brad experiences her daydreams and the possibility of Mr. Kraft canceling the annual event after giving Dreama spring fever. Things get worse for Sabrina when Dreama does magic in front of Brad, thus being transformed into a mouse. As a result, Sabrina has the difficult task of overcoming her case of spring fever while turning Dreama back to normal and removing Brad's witch-hunter gene.
94	19	"The Wild, Wild Witch"	Sheldon Bull	Sheldon Krasnor & David Saling	March 31, 2000	094	8.72
When Sabrina gets in trouble for handing out free drinks at work, skipping her curfew, missing a newspaper deadline and putting off getting her homework done, Hilda and Zelda decide to ground her for a week. Annoyed at all the rules she has to follow, Sabrina proclaims she can't wait for college so she doesn't have to follow so many rules. At that point Jedediah, a magic prospector working with Salem, sends Sabrina to a Wild West town governed by a large number of rules. When the old sheriff gives Sabrina the job so she can become a dance-hall girl, her first rule is to abolish the rules. As a result, the town becomes chaotic when the citizens start kicking up their heels. However, when Sabrina has to confront the Petulant Kid, she changes her mind and realizes that rules and boundaries are good things. Note: Final appearance of Mary Gross as Mrs. Quick.
95	20	"She's Baaaack!"	Leonard R. Garner, Jr.	Carrie Honigblum & Renee Phillips	April 14, 2000	095	8.84
After Sabrina's cousin Amanda comes to town for a visit, Sabrina gets a surprise when it appears Amanda is no longer her usual bratty self. When it looks like they have become the best of friends, Salem lets Sabrina in on the secret that Amanda has a crush on Josh, but when Sabrina gets called down to the coffee house by Josh, she immediately realizes Amanda set them up so she can spend the afternoon with Harvey, the guy she actually has a crush on. Hilda and Zelda are trapped in a genie bottle, so Sabrina has to turn to Salem to find a way to get Amanda to grow up and stop trying to become Harvey's girlfriend. Note: Guest Star Emily Hart as Amanda Wicken.
96	21	"The Four Faces of Sabrina"	Henry Winkler	Sheldon Bull	April 28, 2000	096	8.90
When Sabrina is accepted to different colleges, she feels pressured by Josh, Harvey and Zelda to choose their favorite, but her indecisiveness and need to please everyone causes her to split into four separate Sabrinas. The four faces meet at the senior prom, where they all took different dates-Zelda, Hilda, Harvey and Josh. When Sabrina finally pulls herself together, she announces her decision as to where she will attend college... Note: Final appearance of China Jesusita Shavers as Dreama.
97	22	"The End of an Era"	Leonard R. Garner, Jr.	Frank Conniff	May 5, 2000	097	10.00
Josh and Harvey are fighting for Sabrina's affection, so she feeds them magic friendship bread to bring peace between the two, but they become too close and ignore her. When a frustrated Sabrina undoes the spell, the fighting between the boys worsens. As a last resort, she forces them to compete for her in a magical obstacle course -- then learns that it is a fight to the death. Harvey's unselfish concern for Josh prevents disaster. Afterwards, Sabrina receives a notification from the Other Realm stating that using the magic friendship bread on Harvey has filled his spell quota; no other spells will affect him including the spell that was meant to convince him the magical obstacle course was a dream. Harvey then arrives telling her that he knows she's a witch. Notes: This was the series' final episode on ABC. It marks the final appearance of Martin Mull as Mr. Willard Kraft and Jon Huertas as Brad Alcerro.

=== Season 5 (2000–2001) ===
No. overall	No. in season	Title	Directed by	Written by	Original release date	Prod. code	U.S. viewers (millions)
98	1	"Every Witch Way but Loose"	Anson Williams	Bruce Ferber & Marley Sims	September 22, 2000	098	3.36
Worrywarts Hilda and Zelda grapple with freshman Sabrina's decision to fly the nest and live at college, where she has issues with new roommates Roxie, Morgan and Miles. Trying to move on from Harvey, who broke up with her upon learning she was a witch, Sabrina decides to make some big changes in her life, starting with attending college and living away from home like a normal freshman-but she soon discovers a normal freshman doesn't have life so easy. Note: This was the first episode to air on The WB. First appearance of Soleil Moon Frye as Roxie King, Trevor Lissauer as Miles Goodman and Elisa Donovan as Morgan Cavanaugh.
99	2	"Double Time"	Jeff Melman	Dan Berendsen	September 29, 2000	099	3.62
In an attempt to juggle her hectic academic and social calendars, Sabrina casts a too-good-to-be-true speed spell so she can fly faster than time. Meanwhile, Zelda accepts a position as associate professor at the college, much to the chagrin of her independent-minded niece. Also Hilda buys the Coffee Shop.
100	3	"Heart of the Matter"	Andrew Tsao	Suzanne Gangursky	October 6, 2000	100	3.97
When Sabrina realizes she has been turning down guys left and right since her breakup with Harvey, she casts a spell ensuring that she'll say "yes" every time she's asked out. At first, the spell works, but it goes wrong when it causes Sabrina's head to block out the pain her heart was feeling over her split from Harvey, causing her to become misaligned. Meanwhile, Hilda takes over ownership of the coffee house, but her people skills are scaring the customers away. Also, Miles develops a student-teacher crush on Zelda, and Josh shocks Sabrina by taking Morgan out on a date.
101	4	"You Can't Twin"	Kenneth R. Koch	Ruth Bennett	October 13, 2000	101	3.02
While attending an Other Realm amusement park, Sabrina runs into her shifty evil twin, Katrina, who's set on sabotaging Sabrina's life. Katrina steals Sabrina's passport and slips into the Mortal Realm where she immediately sets out to ruin Sabrina's friendships with Morgan, Roxie, and Miles. Sabrina, meanwhile, ends up in the Other Realm Prison, sharing a cell with Zelda's evil twin, Jezebelda. Luckily, Sabrina manages to get a message to her aunts, who, with the help of Salem's new counterfeiting software, send Sabrina a new passport. Sabrina gets her passport back from Katrina and sends her back to prison. Charles Shaughnessy guests as Alec, Hilda's love interest.
102	5	"House of Pi's"	Andrew Tsao	Laurie Gelman	October 20, 2000	102	3.70
Sabrina and Roxie are teamed together to write a story in an effort to land a coveted spot on the school newspaper. As they both search for a story that is provocative and compelling, they come up with the idea to go undercover as rushes for Morgan's sorority, Mu Pi. But Sabrina has second thoughts on the sorority exposé when she learns it could land Morgan and her sorority sisters in a heap of trouble. Meanwhile, Hilda refuses to give Salem a spot in her Friday night showcase, so he turns on her by becoming a talent agent handling performers from the Other Realm.
103	6	"The Halloween Scene"	Melissa Joan Hart	Jon Vandergriff	October 27, 2000	103	4.15
After she learns Hilda and Zelda won't be home for Halloween, Sabrina decides to throw a party at their place-and soon regrets the decision when she must repair the love of two monsters, Frankenstein and the Bride of Frankenstein, when Roxie gets in the way of their meaningful relationship. Meanwhile, Salem stalks a college girl, and Hilda and Zelda's outfits may not seem to be all that for the galaxy opening. Note: The WB promoted this episode as the 100th episode although it was actually the 103rd episode to air in both broadcast and production order. "Heart of the Matter" is the actual 100th episode in both broadcast and production order.
104	7	"Welcome, Traveler"	Brian K. Roberts	Adam England	November 3, 2000	104	4.57
When Sabrina tries to pull Miles away from his latest conspiracy theory and into some semblance of a social life, she unknowingly pushes him right into the hands of a cult whose eccentric leader claims to be a witch.
105	8	"Some of My Best Friends Are Half-Mortals"	Joyce Gittlin	Barry Vigon & Tom Walla	November 10, 2000	106	4.11
Tired of hiding her true identity when dating normal guys, Sabrina agrees to be fixed up by Zelda with a handsome and charming witch Derek, but the budding romance is dashed when she encounters racism over the fact that she is half-mortal.
106	9	"Lost at C"	Brian K. Roberts	Adam England	November 17, 2000	105	4.91
Sabrina is distraught when she receives her first-ever "C" on a class assignment and turns to Zelda for counseling, but Zelda ends up conducting her own private tutoring session with Sabrina's handsome professor.
107	10	"Sabrina's Perfect Christmas"	Anson Williams	Jon Vandergriff	December 15, 2000	107	3.86
Sabrina hopes to spend a picture-perfect Christmas with Morgan and her family rather than endure the annual insanity with Hilda and Zelda, but soon discovers the ugly secrets under that flawless facade.
108	11	"My Best Shot"	Melissa Joan Hart	Suzanne Gangursky	January 12, 2001	108	4.05
Sabrina tries to give Josh a little confidence-booster in his new passion to be a photographer, but her simple spell to help him make his first sale leads to his getting a big head and walking out on his job at the coffeehouse. Also, Zelda and Salem audition for a commercial; although Zelda gets the part, Salem loses out, but Zelda is less than pleased with the commercial when it doesn't show her face. Note: Elisa Donovan and Soleil Moon Frye are absent in this episode.
109	12	"Tick-Tock, Hilda's Clock"	Amanda Bearse	Laurie Gelman	January 19, 2001	109	3.78
A visit from old friends who are now parents sets Hilda's very literal biological clock running at an alarming speed. So she goes to a doctor to get it fixed but has terrible mood swings so Sabrina gets it but loses when a customer takes it unknowingly. So Hilda rushes and starts to find a man and almost marries a stranger she's just met and knows next to nothing about. Josh finds her clock eventually just after Sabrina offers to give Hilda her clock. Hilda then leaves the stranger, happy to have her clock back.
110	13	"Sabrina's New Roommate"	Brian K. Roberts	Ruth Bennett	January 26, 2001	110	3.74
When Sabrina reluctantly takes in Zelda for a few days while Hilda's on a home remodeling binge, Sabrina and her roommates try to loosen up the tightly wound Zelda.
111	14	"Making the Grade"	Beth Broderick	Laurie Gelman	February 2, 2001	111	4.29
When Sabrina discovers that athletes at Adams receive preferential treatment on their assignments, she writes an exposé in the school paper. But her good intentions go awry when the resulting crackdown means that Adams's star baseball pitcher won't be able to play in the championship game, and that Roxie, whose scholarship rides on her GPA, is forced to pass her formerly easy "Intro to Bowling" class with flying colors. Sabrina strives to help her friends and change her reputation as a pariah. Meanwhile, Salem faces trouble with his bookie, while Hilda tries to maximize her business's profits by offering only glazed donuts, plain bagels, and instant coffee, which inadvertently attracts a much older and more boring crowd to the coffee shop. Note: This episode contains a cameo appearance by Nate Richert as Harvey.
112	15	"Love Is a Many Complicated Thing"	Joyce Gittlin	Dan Berendsen	February 9, 2001	112	3.84
With Valentine's Day approaching, Sabrina starts feeling a little bitter over the fact that she doesn't have a date since Josh is now going out with Morgan. When Roxie sees how depressed she is about not having a date, she starts giving Sabrina a hard time for enjoying everything about Valentine's Day. Sabrina puts a spell on Roxie to fall in love with Miles and Miles does not like Roxie's inappropriate behaviour but at the end says " I tried to put up a fight but she’s very persistent.". Morgan then decides to set Sabrina up with a guy from her Philosophy class so they can double-date with Morgan and Josh. However, the evening doesn't turn out as planned when Sabrina finds out that Josh intends to dump Morgan because of her dominating attitude. After their nasty break-up at dinner, Sabrina works her magic to get the couple back together, but her date with Kevin suffers as a result. Once things get straightened out, Zelda uses her magic to get Sabrina back together with her date. Meanwhile, Hilda gets in a bad mood when she finds out what a great time Zelda had on her date with the mailman.
113	16	"Sabrina, the Muse"	Anson Williams	Suzanne Gangursky	February 16, 2001	113	2.99
Sabrina is flattered when her new boyfriend Kevin writes music about his feelings for her, but the pressure to inspire as his muse becomes a one-sided relationship.
114	17	"Beach Blanket Bizarro"	Anson Williams	Barry Vigon & Tom Walla	February 23, 2001	114	3.37
Sabrina's wild vision of her first college spring break turns squeaky-clean when her aunts ask former teen idol Frankie Avalon to put a spell on the trip that sets Sabrina and her friends in a world straight out of a 1960s beach movie. She briefly bumps into Harvey while checking in. Guest Stars: Aaron Carter and Frankie Avalon Note: Nate Richert appears as Harvey.
115	18	"Witchright Hall"	Kenneth R. Koch	Bruce Ferber & Marley Sims	April 6, 2001	115	3.19
Sabrina's heck-raising cousin Amanda is sent to live in the Mortal Realm for a year. Rather than have her stay at the Spellmans', Hilda and Zelda arrange for Sabrina to help get Amanda into a special school called Witchright Hall for maladjusted young witches. Charles Shaughnessy guests as James Hexton, headmaster of the school and Zelda's former love interest. (Shaughnessy had appeared earlier in the season as Alec, Hilda's love interest.) Note: This episode was a backdoor pilot for a spin-off to be set in Witchright Hall starring Emily Hart, but was not picked up to series by The WB.
116	19	"Sabrina, the Activist"	Kenneth R. Koch	Dan Berendsen	April 27, 2001	116	2.70
Bottling up her feelings of stress about school, relationship problems, and her social life, Sabrina gets involved in a protest to save a historical building but Salem, who is suffering from a crisis, makes Sabrina's protest yesterday's news. Meanwhile, Josh thinks twice about his relationship with Morgan when he strikes up a close friendship with Sabrina.
117	20	"Do You See What I See?"	Kenneth R. Koch	Jon Vandergriff	May 4, 2001	117	2.70
Paranormal-studies major Miles spots a flying car and gives a class presentation on it, but the students are less than thrilled with his UFO sighting. Meanwhile, someone keeps calling Sabrina and hanging up. The caller is revealed at the end of the episode and turns out to be Harvey.
118	21	"Sabrina's Got Spirit"	Kenneth R. Koch	Dan Kael & Grant Nieporte	May 11, 2001	118	2.47
Miles brings a paranormal-energy detector into the house so that he can identify spirits, and it goes berserk near Sabrina.
119	22	"Finally!"	Brian K. Roberts	Adam England	May 18, 2001	119	3.10
Music group Eden's Crush performs in the fifth-season finale, which finds Sabrina and Josh hosting a singles night at the coffee house. The idea is hatched when Sabrina realizes that many people who come to the cafe look lonely, and before she can say hocus-pocus, she and Josh have planned the event. But things go haywire when Josh's friend stands up Roxie, triggering an argument between Josh and Sabrina. Meanwhile, Hilda learns that she and everyone else who had been involved in Salem's attempt at world conquest has been pardoned, except Salem himself, and he's sent to an illegal Other Realm hard-labor camp disguised as a normal home. After realizing how much they miss Salem, Hilda and Zelda successfully manage to bring him back home. Note: Nate Richert appears as Harvey.

=== Season 6 (2001–2002) ===
No. overall	No. in season	Title	Directed by	Written by	Original release date	Prod. code	U.S. viewers (millions)
120	1	"Really Big Season Opener"	Andrew Tsao	Jon Vandergriff	October 5, 2001	122	4.12
Miles wants to direct a student film and has enlisted Sabrina's help. As producer and playing the part of Cheerleader #2, she is involved in casting the other roles in the vampire horror film. Hilda and Zelda want parts in Miles' film until they get a notice for "scare duty"-the Other Realm's version of jury duty. Every few hundred years they must teach a class on how to be scary. If they can get the students to learn everything in one session, they don't have to teach scare class ever again. Sabrina and Miles can't find the perfect vampire for the film, so Sabrina puts out an ad. Vladimir Kortensky (played by guest star Sisqó) shows up and is perfect for the part-too perfect. Sabrina gets suspicious and logs on to the Witch Wide Web, finding out that Vladimir is a real vampire, and despite his acting resume, is after her friends' blood! Sabrina corners Vlad and fights him, Matrix-inspired moves and all. She finally manages to stake him (with a steak). Meanwhile the aunts aren't being very scary in the Other Realm. After the students pelt them with spitwads, they get so angry they turn into genuinely scary monsters-frightening the class and gaining freedom from scare duty. They show up to Sabrina's movie set in time for Hilda to step in as Vlad.
121	2	"Sabrina's Date with Destiny"	Kenneth R. Koch	Adam England	October 12, 2001	120	3.05
Sabrina is ecstatic when Josh returns from his summer in Europe but her joy is soon crushed when he accepts a job offer in Prague. Sabrina takes charge and calls on Destiny (played by guest star Brian McFayden) to give her a glimpse of what her future would be like if she moved overseas to be with Josh but after a long night of romance with Destiny, he finally tells Sabrina that his powers don't work anymore because it's what you make of it but Sabrina later learns Josh found a better job at home and that he can be with her. Meanwhile, Zelda decides to host a party for the Dean of Adams College to raise money for the science department and gets a little help from Hilda who starts to date him and insists her sister to be more humorous at the presentation she'll hold.
122	3	"What's News"	Melissa Joan Hart	Dan Berendsen	October 19, 2001	123	3.35
Sabrina's new relationship with Josh is tested when his new landed job as a photojournalist on the Boston Citizen proves too good to be true after the editor (played by guest star George Wendt) consumes his social time due to his lack of having a life. In the meantime Miles, the paranormal activist, on a documentary kick, tries finding out the secret of what women want and starts a nasty habit of stalking his fellow housemates and female friends. Much to all her new social atmosphere her life is jeopardized when Morgan starts dating Harvey, who still remembers that she is a witch.
123	4	"Murder on the Halloween Express"	Kenneth R. Koch	Dan Berendsen	October 26, 2001	125	2.9
Sabrina takes a holiday idea from Salem and brings her friends on the spooky Mystery Train for a Halloween adventure. There's just one problem: It's in the Other Realm. Sabrina soon learns that the mortals can leave only if she solves the puzzling mystery when she goes back into something out of a 1920 mystery movie.
124	5	"The Gift of Gab"	Brian K. Roberts	Bruce Ferber & Marley Sims	November 2, 2001	121	3.82
A year after turning in a proposal for a radio show on the college station, Sabrina and Roxie get their own talk show where students can call in to talk about issues important to them. While Sabrina is thrilled at the prospect of hosting the show, Roxie isn't, leaving Sabrina to talk her into it. Upon their arrival to the studio, Sabrina becomes tongue-tied while Roxie becomes an instant hit. Seeing how she is natural after a few nights, Sabrina resigns, letting Roxie take control of the show. Meanwhile, Miles becomes the lucky owner of a life-size cardboard cutout of actress Adrienne Barbeau. Eventually deciding to sell it on eBay, he has the opportunity of meeting Adrienne in person, when she arrives at the coffee shop to pick up her new purchase. At the aunt's house, Salem begins to fear for his life, when a stray dog, intent on letting Hilda and Zelda wait on him hand and foot, arrives at the front door.
125	6	"Thin Ice"	Andrew Tsao	Ruth Bennett	November 9, 2001	126	3.86
After Harvey gets injured during a hockey game, he turns to Sabrina for assistance to stay on the college team. When she, Josh, Roxie, and Miles go with Morgan to his next game, Sabrina sees how much helps he needs after hearing the jeers of the crowd, she turns to Mercury for magical skates that assists Harvey win the game for Boston College. She soon gets into trouble with Mercury and Zeus when Harvey's coach takes it upon himself to bronze the magical skates, and has to do the god's errands for a month. It is only after she turns to Hilda for help that Sabrina learns Mercury lied to her in order to get a gullible person to do his work for him.
126	7	"Hex, Lies & No Videotape"	Melissa Joan Hart	Suzanne Gangursky	November 16, 2001	127	3.2
Josh convinces Mike at the newspaper to give Sabrina a writing internship but she doesn't want to just be known as the photojournalist's girlfriend, so she decides to keep their relationship a secret. But matters are worse when Sabrina's boss falls for Josh but Sabrina's new scheme gets her tangled into a sticky situation when she gets trapped in the web of lies. Meanwhile, Hilda takes Morgan with her to ancient Rome to shop for jewelry. There might be a slight confusion for viewers in the sequencing of this episode and the next since Morgan is cut off by her dad and gets a job at Hilda's coffee shop in the next episode.
127	8	"Humble Pie"	Brian K. Roberts	Laurie Gelman	December 7, 2001	124	2.80
Morgan spends all her cash when she goes on a shopping spree and has to borrow money from Sabrina, Roxie and Miles band together to help Morgan financially by lending her money to pay her share of the rent. But Sabrina is left to help Morgan after her family cuts her off, but then Morgan refuses to get a job to pay her friends back where Sabrina offers a big helping of "humble pie". Meanwhile, Zelda and Salem join the Other Realm book club, and Hilda goes to a dinner party at Banning's house. There might be a slight confusion for viewers in the sequencing of this episode and the previous since Morgan is cut off by her dad and gets a job at Hilda's coffee shop in the previous episode.
128	9	"A Birthday Witch"	Kenneth R. Koch	Adam England	January 11, 2002	128	3.49
Sabrina wants to spend her birthday with her boyfriend, Josh, but her Aunt Irma (Barbara Eden) comes to visit from the Other Realm and puts Harvey on trial because he knows Sabrina is a witch and is determined to test him to see where his loyalties lie. Meanwhile, Roxie's ex-boyfriend Isaac Hanson, playing himself, surprises her by performing with his brothers Taylor and Zac, at the soup kitchen where she volunteers.
129	10	"Deliver Us from E-mail"	Anson Williams	Dan Kael	January 18, 2002	129	3.1
Sabrina gets a chance to get a column in the paper when Mike offers her a chance to share her ideas in a meeting with the editors. However, after Sabrina sends her evil twin Katrina a teasing e-mail, Katrina gets furious and sends Sabrina an airhead virus that drains her of her intelligence and turns her into a bimbo, blowing her chances at getting a column when she shows up for the meeting in a skimpy outfit and acting like a ditz. After Harvey notices Sabrina's change in behavior, he takes her to her aunts to get their help. Thanks to her own evil twin, Aunt Zelda discovers that unless they re-teach Sabrina all the important life lessons she's ever learnt before a 48-hour mark is over, Sabrina will be stuck as a bimbo forever.
130	11	"Cloud Ten"	Beth Broderick	Laurie Gelman	January 25, 2002	130	3.3
Feeling depressed after Mike refuses to read the story she wrote due to a pending Garbage strike, Sabrina looks up an old friend from the Other Realm, who then takes her on a wild trip up to Cloud Ten.
131	12	"Sabrina and the Candidate"	Anson Williams	Jon Vandergriff	February 1, 2002	132	2.89
Sabrina hopes to convince Mike to give her a column when she uncovers shady dealings of a local politician. She scores with a scathing exposé, only to later discover that his "dealings" are actually giving money anonymously to families in need, including one special woman.
132	13	"I Think I Love You"	Bill Layton	Barry Vigon & Tom Walla	February 15, 2002	131	3.1
After Josh tells Sabrina that he loves her, she gets a surprise when she tries to proclaim her love to him. Whenever she tries to say those three words to Josh, he thinks that Sabrina doesn't care for him because of the funny voices she gets when trying to say "I love you." When Sabrina thinks her problem has to do with her magic, she goes to see the "love doctor" in the Other Realm, only to find out it has to do with keeping her witchcraft a secret from Josh. After conferring with her aunts, Sabrina decides that the only way she won't have a problem proclaiming her love would be to let Josh know she is a witch, despite their warnings. Meanwhile, Morgan tries to pit boss Hilda and professor Zelda against one another so she won't have to worry about working at the coffee house or going to class for the rest of the semester. Guest Star: Usher
133	14	"The Arrangement"	Kenneth R. Koch	Rosalind Moore	February 22, 2002	134	3.36
When Sabrina, her aunts and Salem are playing a board game one night, they get a surprise visit from Aunt Irma. After hearing Irma's intention of arranging a marriage between Sabrina and another witch; Sabrina tries to get her aunts to stand up to Irma, but they are promptly ignored. The next day, when Sabrina meets Peter (played by guest star Greg Vaughan), the man she's supposed to marry, she is relieved when he says he doesn't want to get married either. It is at this point things get sticky for Sabrina when he notices Roxie and the two eventually fall in love. When Irma finds out that Peter bought an engagement ring for Roxie, she immediately thinks the ring is Sabrina's and sets things in motion for the couple's wedding. When the big day finally arrives, Sabrina is able to get Irma to call off the wedding and Peter and Roxie decide to take things slow in order to get to know one another better.
134	15	"Time After Time"	Jeff Melman	Dan Berendsen	March 15, 2002	133	4.00
Sabrina mixes old fashioned witchcraft with modern technology to help Zelda mend a long time broken heart, but the spell backfires altering Spellman family history and erasing Sabrina. This episode featured Simon Helberg as the owner of www.visitthepast.com - a fictional website.
135	16	"Sabrina and the Kiss"	Jeff Melman	Suzanne Gangursky	March 22, 2002	137	2.75
Sabrina finds herself in trouble when she kisses an old boyfriend, Derek, when he returns and show Sabrina his art work. When she tells Josh, he seems okay. Troubled Sabrina turns to the advice of her roommates, and they assume he's jealous. When Sabrina decides to find out what's wrong with him, a magical whip sends Sabrina and Josh into romantic sagas, and humility ensues. Meanwhile Zelda and Hilda throw a garage sale.
136	17	"The Competition"	Kenneth R. Koch	Ruth Bennett	April 5, 2002	136	3.12
Sabrina gets offended when Josh says that women can't play tennis as well as men, so she enlists tennis superstar Andy Roddick for lessons and juices up with a witch's potion that sends her competitive streak out of control. Meanwhile, Hilda and Zelda reluctantly coach Sabrina's mischievous cousin Amanda for her witch's license test. Guest Star: Emily Hart
137	18	"I, Busybody"	Brian K. Roberts	Adam England	April 12, 2002	140	2.6
Sabrina tries to advise her friends but it ends up backfiring on her and decides to mind her own business. Her advice led Morgan to break up with Harvey. But the witch ends up taking a trip to the Other Realm for help with the new resolution but it ends up making more harm than good. Note: This episode may have caused some confusion for viewers as Miles is mentioned as driving despite him not having a learner's permit in "Driving Mr Goodman" as the two were aired out of production order
138	19	"Guilty!"	Beth Broderick	Dan Berendsen	April 19, 2002	141	2.91
Sabrina's plan to get Zelda nominated for Professor of the Year turns ugly when the committee discovers Zelda attended college in 1873 and fires her from her dream job. Meanwhile Sabrina is wracked with guilt and ends up stuck on an Other Realm guilt trip until she can work through her issues.
139	20	"The Whole Ball of Wax"	Henry Winkler	Laurie Gelman	April 26, 2002	138	2.67
Sabrina's joy over her mother's unexpected visit quickly diminishes when the Witches' Council's decree that the two must never come face to face turns Diana into a ball of wax. Kelly Clarkson stars as an extra in the episode.
140	21	"Driving Mr. Goodman"	Brian K. Roberts	Suzanne Gangursky	May 3, 2002	135	3.25
Sabrina and Miles get in a minor fender bender, but the other driver Mary Jo Ponder (Chyna) brings a phony lawsuit to fleece them for millions. Sabrina turns for expert advice to "Car Talk" radio hosts Click and Clack when trouble ensues and Sabrina and Mary Jo end up in a chick vs. witch fight. Meanwhile Morgan convinces Hilda and Zelda they need an assistant and she's perfect for the job.
141	22	"I Fall to Pieces"	Melissa Joan Hart	Jon Vandergriff	May 10, 2002	139	2.89
Hilda is on the rebound after she breaks up with her boyfriend, so she meets a guy named Will. They instantly fall in love and get engaged, however Sabrina and Zelda think this love should not be, so they plan to break up the couple. As soon as Zelda throws herself at Will, Hilda breaks up with him but then she suddenly turns to stone and falls to pieces. Once knowing Hilda's love was true, Sabrina takes Stone Hilda to a place where she can come back to life. Sabrina must gamble her true love (risking her relationship with Josh) to save her aunt's life. Sabrina then goes and talks to Josh, telling him that she will always love him. Later, after the wedding, Sabrina walks home and sits down to get her broken heel fixed by a guy named Luke. Suddenly, the spell kicks in. Harvey comes in the room and announces that he is moving to California. Josh also comes and says that he can't ever see her again. Then Luke says it was nice meeting her, but he will never see her again. Harvey, Josh and Luke then all say "Goodbye, Sabrina..." and leave through different exits. Sabrina is shocked and upset, and then suddenly turns to stone and falls to pieces. Note: This episode marks the final appearance of David Lascher as Josh Blackhart, Trevor Lissauer as Miles Goodman, and Beth Broderick as Zelda Spellman.

=== Season 7 (2002–2003) ===
No. overall	No. in season	Title	Directed by	Written by	Original release date	Prod. code	U.S. viewers (millions)
142	1	"Total Sabrina Live!"	Kenneth R. Koch	David Babcock	September 20, 2002	142	3.59
Sabrina is restored to life by Zelda, who is forced to give up her adult years and turns into a child. Zelda then announces she is moving to the Other Realm to live her life again. Some time later, Sabrina joins Morgan and Roxie (who have all moved into the Spellman house upon the departure of Sabrina's aunts) on a trip to visit MTV to meet Total Request Live host Carson Daly and interview the rock band Course of Nature after Morgan wins a writing contest with the ultra-hip Scorch music magazine. But after Morgan admits she submitted Sabrina's writing, Sabrina turns it around and captures a job at the magazine. Notes: First appearance of the Scorch Magazine crew. This episode also features Hart's future husband Mark Wilkerson who is the lead singer of Course of Nature.
143	2	"The Big Head"	Melissa Joan Hart	Andrew Borakove & Bill Rosenthal	September 27, 2002	143	3.59
Sabrina's first assignment at Scorch is to write a profile about an overconfident rock musician (Howie Dorough), but when her senior editor Annie publishes the truth about the arrogant superstar, he threatens to sue the magazine unless Sabrina gives a public apology at his concert. Back at the house, Morgan and Roxie decide to train Salem. They begin with the purchase of a collar, which proves a shock for the magical cat.
144	3	"Call Me Crazy"	Kenneth R. Koch	Trish Baker	October 4, 2002	144	3.10
Sabrina's desperate attempts to impress her colleagues and prove to them she's not a kid backfire when she accidentally blurts out too much information about her magical antics and they end up thinking she's bonkers, but a chance meeting with Ashanti lands Sabrina an interview and an opportunity for her co-workers to see her in a new light.
145	4	"Shift Happens"	Jeff Melman	Torian Hughes	October 11, 2002	145	3.37
Sabrina is scared stiff to interview a hip hop diva (Da Brat) with a nasty reputation, but her spell to make the superstar more harmonious backfires and the girls end up swapping personalities.
146	5	"Free Sabrina"	Brian K. Roberts	Tod Himmel	October 18, 2002	146	3.16
Sabrina sets out to expose a famous actress as a kleptomaniac after she sees the star shoplifting in a boutique. She devises a plan to catch the sticky-fingered diva in the act, but when it backfires Sabrina ends up in the hands of the police.
147	6	"Sabrina Unplugged"	Mark Cendrowski	Jennifer Glickman	November 1, 2002	147	2.99
When Sabrina is caught by the office webcam using her powers, she magically enters Leonard's computer to destroy the evidence. While she is in the computer, Leonard alters Sabrina's body (thinking it's just a picture of her), greatly enlarging her breasts and butt, along with bleaching her hair and giving her a very revealing red dress and a bulky 1960s hairstyle. When Sabrina re-emerges from the computer she finds that she can't reverse the transformation or change out of her skimpy outfit, leaving her stuck in her new bimbo image. Note: The animated Shaggy (voiced by Casey Kasem) and Scooby-Doo show up inside the computer.
148	7	"Witch Way Out"	Brian K. Roberts	Adam Hamburger & David Hamburger	November 8, 2002	148	3.76
Sabrina meets the handsome owner (Austin Peck) of an art gallery and decides to make a date with him instead of going out with her friends. But she has a change of heart when she realizes he may want to add her to his collection of exotic creatures.
149	8	"Bada-Ping!"	Anson Williams	Nancy Cohen	November 15, 2002	149	2.86
Sabrina catches a special performance by pop star Avril Lavigne and meets a talented musician whom she believes is being blackmailed by a gangster. After Sabrina is threatened by the gangster, she and Salem take a trip into the future where she sees that her premature death is really caused by Amanda's second-hand smoke. Garry Marshall also guest stars as Mickey Brentwood. Guest Star: Emily Hart
150	9	"It's a Hot, Hot, Hot, Hot Christmas"	Melissa Joan Hart	Dan Kael	December 6, 2002	150	3.80
When Sabrina, Roxie, and Morgan go to Miami with Leonard to celebrate Christmas, they have a run-in with Roxie's mother Candy (Kate Jackson) at their time share. However, when their place gets robbed, Candy gets accused, ultimately leaving Sabrina and Morgan to help Roxie clear her mother of the charges. Meanwhile, when Leonard finds out that Sabrina brought Salem along to the condo, he tells her to put him into the condo's kennel, where Salem complains about being treated like an "animal", and Morgan is crowned "Miss Wet Christmas".
151	10	"Ping, Ping a Song"	Asaad Kelada	Tod Himmel	January 10, 2003	151	3.08
Sabrina, Roxie and Morgan decide to audition for a television talent show, National Superstars, where singers compete for a record deal. But the magic Sabrina uses to help the group hit their notes might have some serious side effects that could ruin the girls' friendship.
152	11	"The Lyin', the Witch and the Wardrobe"	Kenneth R. Koch	Mike Larson	January 17, 2003	152	3.42
When Sabrina finds out that Annie assigned her the task to interview British pop star Daniel Bedingfield, she happily tells Morgan about the spread Scorch plans to do on him. After she learns that Annie needs a designer to outfit the singer for the photo shoot, Sabrina promptly tells her about the great fashion designs Morgan came up with and is able to land her friend the job. However, when everybody at the magazine sees how bad Morgan's work is, they designate Sabrina to be the one to fire her. However, when she attempts to do so, Morgan gets mad at Sabrina for lying to her when she first told her that her clothes were great. They ultimately patch things up on Roxie's radio show as Daniel sings one of his songs.
153	12	"In Sabrina We Trust"	Bill Layton	Torian Hughes	January 24, 2003	153	3.42
Sabrina learns from the Other Realm that her house has to undergo a magical-systems check. She tries to keep Roxie and Morgan from finding out, but when Roxie gets suspicious Sabrina must use her powers to gain Roxie's trust.
154	13	"Sabrina in Wonderland"	Anson Williams	Dan Berendsen	January 31, 2003	154	3.10
When Sabrina meets a cute guy named Aaron at the office, she begins to wonder why she continually runs from him every chance she gets. Curious to find out why she is hesitant to get close him, Sabrina turns to her magic book for help. However, when she arrives home, Sabrina gets a little surprise at seeing Salem with a white rabbit that he would like to keep as a pet. After she finds a spell that can help her find out what makes Aaron tick, Sabrina gets taken on a wild ride through Wonderland, where she learns a few truths about why she has been acting so strangely around guys she's interested in. Note: First appearance of Dylan Neal as Aaron Jacobs.
155	14	"Present Perfect"	Kenneth R. Koch	Trish Baker	February 7, 2003	155	3.42
Sabrina tires of her clumsy ways so she uses her magic to make herself mistake-free, but the spell also turns her into a know-it-all and ends up jeopardizing her friendships. In the end, she blows her top with Annie and quits. Meanwhile, Roxie and Morgan run into debt troubles after they use credit cards to pay their bills. Note: This is the last appearance of the Scorch Magazine crew.
156	15	"Cirque du Sabrina"	Anson Williams	Suzanne Gangursky	February 14, 2003	156	3.35
After trying unsuccessfully to balance the things in her life, Sabrina's room turns into a circus tent. Upon talking to the ringmaster, Sabrina learns that in order for things to return to normal, she has to walk a tightrope above her bed until finding the balance between spending time with Aaron, her friends, and Harvey. It was through the course of these events that Sabrina learns that Harvey is still in love with her.
157	16	"Getting to Nose You"	Kenneth R. Koch	Adam Hamburger & David Hamburger	February 21, 2003	157	2.80
Sabrina gets tongue-tied every time she tries to tell Aaron her feelings, so she uses her magic to find out how Aaron feels about her. Meanwhile, Harvey tells Roxie and Morgan that he still carries a torch for Sabrina. Guest: Sixpence None the Richer
158	17	"Romance Looming"	Melissa Joan Hart	Nancy Cohen	February 27, 2003	158	3.01
When Sabrina saves Morgan from a deadly fall, she faces the wrath of The Fates, Mackenzie (Sophia Bush), Ashley (Jennifer Hall) and Paris (Christina Vidal), three goddesses who control people's lives. Also, Aaron proposes to Sabrina, but she suspects that the Fates are manipulating him.
159	18	"Spellmanian Slip"	Mark Cendrowski	Andrew Borakove & Bill Rosenthal	March 20, 2003	159	3.29
Sabrina invites her future in-laws, Bob and Shirley to dinner. While visiting, she finds out that Aaron was engaged before. While her guests, Harvey, Morgan, Roxie, and Aaron bicker, she conjures up some Harmony Salt which causes everybody sans Salem to sing. She accidentally says she loves Harvey which makes her search her heart.
160	19	"You Slay Me"	Asaad Kelada	Dan Kael	March 27, 2003	160	3.01
After attending a bridal fair, Sabrina decides she wants a "princess wedding" and contacts Cinderella for advice on planning the affair. Unfortunately, the witch goes overboard and begins behaving like a monster instead. This causes her to have claws, talons, fire breath, and strength similar to a dragon. She finds out that this is what also happened to Cinderella. Elsewhere, Roxie and Morgan reluctantly unite to plan Sabrina's bridal shower.
161	20	"A Fish Tale"	Bill Layton	Adam England	April 17, 2003	161	1.98
Aunt Irma pays a surprise visit to Sabrina, who desperately tries to conceal the fact that she's marrying a mortal. Meanwhile, Roxie and Morgan search for a replacement roommate.
162	21	"What a Witch Wants"	Scott Marshall	Suzanne Gangursky	April 24, 2003	162	2.57
163	22	"Soul Mates"	Kenneth R. Koch	Dan Berendsen	April 24, 2003	163	2.57
As Sabrina, Roxie, and Morgan go on a bachelorette cruise to Bermuda, Salem stays home with Aaron, only to get into a fight with him. Once back home, Sabrina tries to conceal her wedding-day jitters after waking up with a case of cold feet - literally. She is doubting if she is soul mates with Aaron, so Doubt visits her and gives her Aaron's soul stone and tells her that if she wants, hers is on the North Star too. If the soul pieces fit, they are soul mates. The bride-to-be receives a measure of comfort from her mother and Aunt Hilda, who arrive unexpectedly with an unrecognizable Zelda (now a candle in exchange for Sabrina's mother) in tow. Everything is done but Sabrina has second thoughts. Right before anything, Sabrina tries shaving the soul stones to make them fit, but it won't work. When Sabrina is ready to head down the church to get married her father arrives. Aaron and Sabrina choose to cancel the wedding. She runs down the aisle trying to leave and she gets outside and she sees Harvey on a motorcycle. They kiss and ride away with each other and their soul stones fall and fit perfectly together. When they ride off it was 12:36, the time Harvey and Sabrina first met 7 years before.

== TV films ==
Title	Directed by	Written by	Original release date	U.S. viewers (millions)
Sabrina the Teenage Witch	Tibor Takács	Story by : Barney Cohen & Kathryn Wallack; Teleplay by : Barney Cohen, Nicholas Factor & Kathryn Wallack	April 7, 1996	N/A
The movie centers around Sabrina who is sent to live with her eccentric aunts in Riverdale. On her sixteenth birthday, Sabrina discovers that she is a witch. Sabrina then develops a crush on Seth, the cutest boy in school who happens to be dating Katie La More, the school's "Queen Bee". Sabrina has to find a way to use her newly discovered magical power to get Seth to notice her, but at the same time not cast a love spell, which could backfire on her. After Katie dumps Seth, he starts to notice Sabrina. Sabrina is able to use her magic to win a track competition and get Seth to ask her to the Spring fling. Katie discovers Sabrina's secret and sets out to let everyone know what Sabrina is. Sabrina has to use her magic to turn Katie into a poodle to stop her. All the while, Harvey likes Sabrina and waits to see if she will have a change of heart and start to notice him. The story ends happily with Sabrina and Harvey together and with Katie, not a dog, and back with Seth.
Sabrina Goes to Rome	Tibor Takács	Dan Berendsen	October 4, 1998	12.95
If Sabrina can't open a mysterious antique gold locket and release the power trapped within, her Aunt Sophia will be lost forever. "The secret to the locket lies in Rome," says her father. Sabrina heads for Italy and the Eternal City of Rome, with Salem in her backpack.
Sabrina Down Under	Kenneth R. Koch	Dan Berendsen	September 26, 1999	10.28
Sabrina travels to Australia's Great Barrier Reef with Gwen, a fellow witch from England, for a week-long vacation where they try to help protect a hidden mermaid colony whose habitat is threatened by ocean pollution, and by a local marine biologist, Dr. Julian Martin, determined to find the colony as his claim to fame.

== Crossover special ==
Title	Directed by	Written by	Original release date	U.S. viewers (millions)
Clueless Season 1, Episode 17: "Mr. Wright"	Henry Winkler	Julie Brown	February 7, 1997	13.08
Cher Horowitz (Rachel Blanchard) becomes attracted to the new student David Wright (Seth Peterson), who seems like the perfect guy. But she soon figures out that he is not as perfect as she assumed. Melissa Joan Hart guest stars as Sabrina Spellman. The title is a reference from a Julie Brown earlier work, Earth Girls Are Easy, in which the main character is seeking true love, her "Mr. Right".
