= Child Star: The Shirley Temple Story =

2001 television film by Nadia Tass

- DVD cover
- Based on: Child Star: An Autobiography by Shirley Temple Black
- Written by: Joe Weisenfeld
- Directed by: Nadia Tass
- Starring: Connie Britton; Colin Friels; Emily Hart; Ashley Rose Orr; Hinton Battle
- Music by: Bill Elliott
- Country of origin: United States
- Original language: English

Production
- Executive producer: Melissa Joan Hart
- Producer: Iain Paterson
- Cinematography: David Parker
- Editor: Maryann Brandon
- Running time: 95 minutes
- Production companies: Hartbreak Films; Radio Pictures; Walt Disney Television

Original release
- Network: ABC
- Release: May 13, 2001

Child Star: The Shirley Temple Story is a 2001 American made-for-television biographical family drama film. It is based on Shirley Temple's 1988 autobiography Child Star and stars Emily Hart and Ashley Rose Orr as Shirley Temple. The film was produced by Iain Paterson, with Melissa Joan Hart serving as executive producer, and was directed by Nadia Tass. The film aired on ABC in The Wonderful World of Disney on May 13, 2001.

== Synopsis ==
The film chronicles the early life and career of 1930s child actress Shirley Temple, from her birth and first dance lessons at The Meglin Dance Studio to her rise to stardom in a series of musical comedies for Fox Film and subsequent transition as a teen actress, and the impact she made on American society during the height of the Great Depression, with her friendship with famed aviatrix Amelia Earhart and Franklin Roosevelt complimenting her during his fireside chats on the radio.

== Cast ==
- Connie Britton as Gertrude Temple
- Colin Friels as George Temple
- Hinton Battle as Bill "Bojangles" Robinson
- Ashley Rose Orr as Shirley Temple
  - Emily Hart as Shirley Temple (Teen)
  - Samantha Leslie Gilliams as Shirley Temple, age 3
- James Barkley as Jack, age 13
- Peter Barron as Assistant Director
- Randall Berger Jr. as Bank President
- Zoe Bertram as Mrs. Pelucci
- Alex Brown as Film Crew Member
- Paul Craig as Simon Lee
- John Diedrich as Winfield Sheehan
- Jerome Ehlers as John Ford
- Tony Farrell as Henry Hathaway
- Frank Gallacher as Schenk
- William Gluth as Lionel Barrymore
- Daniel Gostolow as Dancer
- Don Halbert as Wright
- Nicholas Hammond as Adolphe Menjou
- Kaitlin Howley as Carlotta
- Annie Jones as Mother
- Ron Kamien as Victor McLaglen
- Siobhan Kermeci as Mary Lou
- David LePage as Waiter at Brown Derby
- Brian Lipson as Cobb
- Alex Marriott as George Jr., age 16
- John O'May as Louis B. Mayer
- Shane McNamara as Dr. Madsen
- Ben Mendelsohn as Alexander Hall
- Russell Menzies as Dancer
- Mark Mitchell as Griff
- Stewart Morritt as B.P. Schulberg
- Jessica Napier as Klammie
- Tilia O'Donnell-Barber as Poor Little Girl
- Kieron O'Leary as Dancer
- Dale Pengelly as Buddy Ebsen
- Doug Penty as Radio Announcer
- Joe Petruzzi as David O. Selznick
- Nathan Phillips as Hugh
- Rob Phillips as Dancer
- Ken Radley as Adolph Zukor
- Bruce Roberts as Gorney
- Isabelle Ryan as Mrs. Meglin
- Bruce Shapiro as David Butler
- Elissa Stephens as Dell
- Lucy Taylor as Amelia Earhart
- Chris Uhlmann as Banker #1
- Steven Vidler as Darryl F. Zanuck
- David Watson as Dancer
- Chris White as Brooklyn Man #1
- Paul Winterbine as Dancer
- Felicity Andersen as Blonde Dancer
- Ingrid Bloom as Miss Jones
- Samantha Hall as Pedestrian
- Chloe Looper as Additional voices
- Nehama Patkin as Piano player
- Steve Syson as Patron

== Production ==
The film was shot on location at Port Melbourne, Australia for budgetary reasons. Melissa Joan Hart notes in her commentary track for the DVD release of the film that many aspects of Temple's career and filmography were cut from the film as it would have added to its runtime, and that the shooting location also presented challenges such as the use of right-hand drive vehicles (which necessitated making modifications to some of the cars to appear as though they are left-hand drive; a hidden stunt driver controlling the vehicle was used in one scene) as well as the accents of the Australian cast members, enlisting the services of a dialect coach. Many of the dolls used in the film were actual Shirley Temple dolls owned by Hart as part of her collection.

The scene where Temple is surprised by the on-set workers at the Fox Studio Lot is fictional; Shirley was not allowed to fraternize with studio crew and other personnel and was given a small bungalow which served as her playhouse and for her to take school lessons through an on-site tutor.

Besides portraying Bill Robinson, Broadway veteran and tap dancer Hinton Battle also served as the film's choreographer.

== Reception ==
The film received mostly negative reviews from critics.

Howard Rosenberg of Los Angeles Times called the film "one-dimensional" and "underwritten, overplayed, [and] extremely weak," taking particular issue of then-ten-year old Ashley Rose Orr's portrayal of a five-year old Shirley Temple.

Michael Speier of Variety gave the film a negative review, stating that while it did depict the studio system of the era as well as making brief mentions of Shirley's father's mismanagement of her earnings, the film focused more on an idealized depiction of her career; "Beyond that, auds expecting a sweeps expose on the biggest draw of her era will be reminded via overbearing sentimentality that this is a “Wonderful World of Disney” presentation all the way." Speier also criticised Ashley Rose's perceived lack of resemblance to Temple, though he gave some mild praise towards Orr's dance numbers and the period costumes.

Scott Pierce of Deseret News felt that the lead actress could not compare to the person she portrayed, stating "In a way, it makes no difference. No matter who the producers of "Child Star: The Shirley Temple Story" chose, the child couldn't possibly measure up to the legend," also noting the incongruity of Orr portraying a five-year old and the film's lackluster portrayal of Temple's life story.
