= Sabrina: The Animated Series =

American animated television series

- Genre: Fantasy
- Based on: Sabrina the Teenage Witch by: Dan DeCarlo, George Gladir, & Archie Comics
- Developed by: Savage Steve Holland; Kat Likkel
- Directed by: Peter Ferk; Karen Hyden
- Voices of: Emily Hart; Nick Bakay; Melissa Joan Hart; Jay Brazeau; Bill Switzer; Cree Summer; Chantal Strand
- Opening theme: "Sabrina (She'll Bewitch Ya)" by B*Witched
- Ending theme: "Sabrina (She'll Bewitch Ya)" (reprise, instrumental)
- Country of origin: United States
- Original language: English
- No. of episodes: 65

Production
- Executive producers: Savage Steve Holland; Paula Hart; Andy Heyward; Robby London; Michael Maliani
- Producers: Kevin Murphy; Michael Silberkleit; Richard Goldwater; Dianne Dixon; Savage Steve Holland; Cydne Clark; Steve Granat; Dan Studney
- Animator: Hong Ying Animation Company Limited
- Running time: 22 minutes
- Production companies: Riverdale Productions; Kent/QMA; Savage Studios Ltd.; Hartbreak Films; DIC Productions, L.P.

Original release
- Network: UPN (Disney's One Too); ABC (Disney's One Saturday Morning)
- Release: September 6 – November 19, 1999

Related
- Sabrina: Friends Forever (2002); Sabrina's Secret Life (2003)

Sabrina: The Animated Series is an American animated television series based on the Archie Comics series Sabrina the Teenage Witch. Produced by Savage Studios Ltd. and Hartbreak Films in association with DIC Productions, L.P. (owned by Disney at the time), the series is an animated prequel of the 1996–2003 live-action series Sabrina the Teenage Witch.

The series aired on both ABC and UPN from September 6 to November 19, 1999. 65 episodes were produced.

== Premise ==
Unlike past incarnations, Sabrina Spellman in this series is depicted as younger. As in the original comic series, Sabrina lives with her two paternal witch aunts, Hilda Spellman and Zelda Spellman, and her loud-mouthed black cat Salem Saberhagen, all of whom advise Sabrina on the use of several magics. Most episodes center on the typical issues of middle school, along with those that emanated from Sabrina's inexperience with or misuse of several magic, witchcraft and extremely powerful and complex spells. Sabrina and her best friend Chloe Flan would often use magic (often from the "Spooky Jar": a cookie jar containing a green djinn-like being in the family's kitchen) for all types of perceived emergencies, ranging from trying to fit into skinny new clothes to turning Harvey into a superhero. By the end of every episode, Sabrina's innate magical abilities would unintentionally backfire and she would learn that using magic usually is not the solution to her everyday issues.

== Characters ==
=== Main ===
- Sabrina Spellman (voiced by Emily Hart) is a witch-mortal hybrid who, lives in a comfortable house, with her two aunts, Hilda and Zelda, and her black pet cat, Salem, in the town of Greendale. Sabrina will not become magically empowered, until she turns 16, but she is still able to borrow spells from Hilda and Zelda using a magical "Spooky Jar", which she often does. But she usually finds that her meddling turns situations from bad to worse. Sabrina's friend Chloe is aware of her magic, but Harvey Kinkle, another friend, is not. Whenever she casts a spell, the magic is made in pink and yellow. Emily Hart is Melissa Joan Hart's real-life sister, who played Sabrina's cousin Amanda in several episodes of the Sabrina the Teenage Witch TV series.
- Hilda Spellman and Zelda Spellman (both voiced by Melissa Joan Hart): While Hilda suggests they bend the rules sometime, and use magic to get ahead, Zelda is determined to say "No" right up until the moment she gives up. Hilda is more carefree and mindless than her cautious sister, Zelda, and, although they do argue sometimes, they are still sisters. In this series and Sabrina's Secret Life, Hilda and Zelda both have the appearance of teenagers, as this was the punishment they received from Enchantra for "abusing magic" in the past. Whenever Zelda casts a spell, the magic is always made in blue and yellow. When Hilda casts a spell, the magic is made in purple and yellow. Melissa Joan Hart is best known for playing Sabrina in the Showtime film adaptation and the ABC/WB series.
- Salem Saberhagen (voiced by Nick Bakay) knows the right keys to push to talk Sabrina into just about anything, and he does it guiltlessly, until he is caught. Salem was once a powerful wizard, but he was locked into a cat-form because he was constantly trying to take over the world. But he makes up for his predicament with magical charms that help Sabrina in some situations. Whenever Salem casts a spell, the magic is made in purple and blue. Nick Bakay is the only cast member to reprise his role from the 1996 Sabrina, the Teenage Witch TV series.
- Uncle Quigley (voiced by Jay Brazeau) is an original character created for the animated series, he is Sabrina's maternal great-uncle and the household's adult guardian, often behaving as a father figure to Sabrina. Despite all his eccentricities, Uncle Quigley does not have any magic powers; like Sabrina's mother, he is a mortal.
- Chloe Flan (voiced by Cree Summer) is Sabrina's best friend, who, other than Uncle Quigley, is the only mortal, who, knows Sabrina's secret.
- Harvey Kinkle (voiced by Bill Switzer) is Sabrina's male friend and crush, who is handsome with a pleasant personality. Well he only admits to Sabrina that, she is his "best pal", he likes her very much. But Harvey is unaware that Sabrina is a witch, although he often sees the results of the magic himself.
- Gemini “Gem” Stone (voiced by Chantal Strand) is a snobby, popular, mean and spoiled girl who lives in a mansion with her parents, Mr. and Mrs. Stone, down the street. Gem occasionally sees Sabrina as her main competitor for Harvey's attention, who Gem is interested in, although Harvey likes Sabrina instead. She is inspired, by Libby Chesler (Jenna Leigh Green) in the TV series.

=== Supporting ===
- The Spooky Jar is a djinn who resides in a purple cookie jar in Sabrina's kitchen. Whenever Sabrina needs a special spell, she can get one from the Spooky Jar, but they rarely turn out the way she expects. Spooky Jar speaks entirely in rhymes.
- Perry "Pi" McDonald is Harvey's best friend and Sabrina and Chloe's friend, too. He is very smart and quite unusual in his own special way. His eyes are never seen due to his pork pie hat obscuring them. He has been described by Sabrina as "totally out of it and really smart at the same time". According to the episode "Upside Down Town", it is implied that, he is of Chinese descent.
- Horace Slugloafe is a bully to Harvey, Bernard, and a bunch of other kids, and calls them by their surnames.
- Bernard is a small, bald, nerdy boy with glasses who is friends with Sabrina, Pi, Chloe and Harvey. He is often bullied by Slugloafe and easily bossed around by Gem.
- Tim is a witch hunter who appears in "Most Dangerous Witch", "Documagicary" and "Enchanted Vacation". He was previously bullied by witches as a child, due to his lack of magical powers, except for his immortality, even though his mother was a witch. For this reason, he viewed witches as evil and so he collects them as trophies for revenge along with his sidekick, aardvark, named Elton, named after a British musician. Tim wears a hat with a witch cauldron marked with a prohibition sign on it.
- Queen Enchantra is the ruler of all witches and head of the Witches' Council. When she casts spells, the magic is made in red and purple.
- Mr. and Mrs. Stone are Gem's parents and the richest people in town. They first appeared in "Witch Switch"; when Sabrina wishes herself to be rich, they almost sent Sabrina to Cambridge when they found out she got a C in her class report, but later changed their mind after Sabrina never wished herself as being rich. They also appeared in "Stone Broke" when they lost their money and had Gem move into Sabrina's house until their dog struck oil.
- Edward Spellman is Sabrina's long-lost father who is a very strong warlock and Zelda and Hilda's older brother. Some years after he and his mortal wife, Diana, unitedly separated, he ended up falling for another human named Futura, whom he intended to get married to before a jealous Sabrina tried to break them up.
- Diana Spellman is Sabrina's human mother and Quigley's sister who is an archeologist and works at a dig site in Egypt. She is heard in the episode "Picture Perfect".

== Production ==
Sabrina had previously appeared in an animated format on The Archie Show (animated by Filmation), but the popularity of the live-action Sabrina the Teenage Witch sitcom (which began its fourth season, its last on ABC, shortly after the animated series' debut) formed part of the basis for this spin-off series. The series was developed by Savage Steve Holland and Kat Likkel, with Holland serving as showrunner and executive producer of the series. As such, the series reflected some of the irreverent style of humor seen in Eek! The Cat. Celebrity voice cameos in this series included Downtown Julie Brown, Mr. T, Long John Baldry and "Weird Al" Yankovic (one episode only). Melissa Joan Hart, who starred as Sabrina in the live-action sitcom, served as producer of this series, but her younger sister, Emily Hart (who played the recurring character Amanda on the sitcom), voiced Sabrina. Melissa instead voiced Sabrina's two aunts, Hilda and Zelda, originally played on the live-action series by Beth Broderick and Caroline Rhea, respectively. Nick Bakay reprises his role as Salem from the live-action series. The theme music is performed by the Irish girl group B*Witched.

The series was announced to be in production in November 1998, with Disney commissioning 65 episodes to air on UPN's then-upcoming Disney block and its parent block on ABC. Disney's Buena Vista Television was announced as the television distributor for the series while DIC Entertainment and Viacom Consumer Products would share merchandising rights. In January 1999, it was announced that Buena Vista International Television would handle international television sale rights.

== Episodes ==
No. overall	No. in season	Title	Written by	Original release date
11	1	"Most Dangerous Witch"	Thomas Pugsley; Greg Klein	September 6, 1999
Hilda and Zelda have a dream about Tim the Witch-Smeller, which means only one thing—he is coming to their town. Tim has a magic-smelling aardvark, which accidentally sniffs out Harvey while Harvey is wearing a magic amulet he "borrowed" from Sabrina.
4	2	"You Said a Mouse-ful"	Gary Apple	September 7, 1999
Salem eats the mouse that Sabrina and Harvey were using for their science project, so Sabrina turns Salem into a mouse to serve as a substitute.
5	3	"Boogie Shoes"	Sean Abley	September 8, 1999
When Sabrina learns that Harvey is a bad dancer, she conjures up magic shoes that help Harvey dance, but become impossible to come off.
28	4	"Tail of Two Kitties"	Jan Strnad	September 9, 1999
Salem falls in love with Harvey's new cat, only to discover she is really a witch who was met with the same punishment and is using Salem in order to break the spell and turn back into a human.
16	5	"The Senses-Shattering Adventures of Captain Harvtastic"	Howard Margulies	September 10, 1999
When Harvey is embarrassed by his own comic book, Sabrina accidentally transports the two of them, along with Salem into it.
6	6	"Witch Switch"	Stewart St. John	September 11, 1999 (on ABC)
Sabrina and Gem switch lives with magic Yin-Yang amulets after Sabrina is invited to Gem's birthday party and Sabrina becomes jealous of Gem's seemingly charmed life. But when Sabrina tries to switch back, Gem reveals she likes being a witch.
12	7	"Picture Perfect"	Michael Patrick Dobkins	September 13, 1999
Sabrina runs against Gem for the Student of the Year Ceremony. But when she is down in the polls, Salem grants Sabrina with a devious magic trinket.
18	8	"Field Trippin'"	Barry Hawkins	September 14, 1999
Sabrina agrees to babysit a pair of bratty twins at the art museum with Harvey so she can have money for a concert. However, Sabrina accidentally zaps Harvey and the twins into the paintings.
26	9	"No Time to Be a Hero"	Doug Molitor	September 15, 1999
Sabrina wrongly receives credit for saving Harvey's life, despite having done nothing. Attempting to remedy the problem by going back in time, Sabrina only makes things worse.
14	10	"Extreme Harvey"	Tracy Berna	September 16, 1999
Sabrina uses magic to make Harvey a pro-skateboarder, but Harvey's fame starts to go to his head.
1	11	"Shrink to Fit"	Josh Stolberg	September 17, 1999
Sabrina and Chloe use magic to make themselves thin enough to wear the latest pair of skinny jeans after Gem mocks them and Sabrina assumes Harvey likes skinny girls, but find that the spell causes the user to reduce in height as well as weight.
13	12	"Has Anybody Seen My Quigley?"	Gary Apple	September 18, 1999 (on ABC)
When Quigley gets fed up with Sabrina, Hilda and Zelda's behavior around the house, he leaves and hires a strict nanny to take his place. When the nanny becomes too controlling, Sabrina, Hilda and Zelda conjure a spell to make the nanny more easy-going.
10	13	"Wag the Witch"	Steve Brasfield	September 20, 1999
Gem hires a reporter whose job is to uncover how "weird" Sabrina is. Sabrina has the reporter fitted with glasses that make Sabrina look normal.
19	14	"Witchy Grrrls"	Josh Stolberg	September 21, 1999
Sabrina, Hilda, Zelda and Chloe team up to become an all-girl, bubblegum pop band, the Flavor Babes, but when it becomes apparent that none of them have any musical talent, Zelda uses magic that makes them talented and famous.
24	15	"Paranormal Pi"	Dennis Haley; Marcy Brown	September 22, 1999
Pi is on the trail of discovering the Spellmans' family secret after Sabrina's Uncle Zamboni comes to town and Pi mistakes him for an alien.
7	16	"Anywhere But Here"	Alexx Van Dyne	September 23, 1999
After being denied access to an age-inappropriate movie, told not to buy a CD recommended for older audiences and banned from playing a video game for young adults, Sabrina wishes she were grown up and gets sent to a reality where she is an adult married to Harvey with three hyperactive kids, no magic and struggling to deal with adulthood.
8	17	"Nothin' Says Lovin' Like Something From a Coven"	Michael Edens	September 24, 1999
Sabrina tries to throw her own Halloween party.
17	18	"Once Upon a Whine"	Jim Staahl; Jim Fisher	September 25, 1999 (on ABC)
Sabrina accidentally brings Cinderella to life. While trying to send her back, Sabrina accidentally sends Harvey to "Once Upon A Time Land" in Cinderella's place.
21	19	"Documagicary"	Stewart St. John	September 27, 1999
Sabrina signs a contract to star in her own Netherworld TV show, but learns the downsides of being popular.
22	20	"The Grandparent Trap"	Alexx Van Dyne	September 28, 1999
The Spellmans are worried that Sabrina's grandparents are getting a divorce.
9	21	"I Got Glue Babe"	Glenn Leopold	September 29, 1999
Sabrina's magic spell to make Gem friends with her backfires and the two are glued together during a carnival trip.
2	22	"Boy Meets Bike"	John Hoberg	September 30, 1999
Sabrina grants Harvey with a magical bike that develops a mind of its own.
23	23	"Upside Down Town"	Mike Palleschi	October 1, 1999
Sabrina prepares a magical cake for the block party that changes the personality of anyone who eats it, including turning Harvey evil and making Gem smart enough to finally figure out that Sabrina is a witch.
3	24	"The Importance of Being Norma"	Savage Steve Holland; Kat Likkel; Cydne Clark; Steve Granat	October 2, 1999 (on ABC)
Sabrina competes against Gem for a spot on the cheerleading squad. However, she finds herself bogged down by Norma, a dorky transfer student whom she is forced to look after.
15	25	"Stage Fright"	Erin Ehrlich	October 4, 1999
Zelda and Hilda prepare for a visit from Enchantra, who is visiting to see if Hilda and Zelda are worthy of having their perpetual youth spell removed, but things go wrong when Zelda conjures Romeo from Romeo and Juliet into the real world and he falls in love with every girl he sees, including Enchantra.
31	26	"Witchitis"	Glenn Leopold	October 5, 1999
Sabrina is afraid to get her witchitis vaccination, but her procrastination only leads to her getting sick, with a rapid remedy conjured up by Salem leading to her witchitis getting worse.
20	27	"My Stepmother the Babe"	Lisa Medway	October 6, 1999
Sabrina becomes jealous of her wizard father's new fiancé, a kindly antique dealer named Futura Hyde, so Sabrina uses a spell to mentally make Futura an immature teenage girl so she can relate to her, which Sabrina's father does not like, as he wants a more mature woman.
27	28	"Absence of Malissa"	Tracy Berna	October 7, 1999
Sabrina is sent to Witch Boot Camp, where the captain continuously mocks her for being a half-witch.
25	29	"This Is Your Nine Lives"	Alison Wilke; Melanie Shea	October 8, 1999
Sabrina, Harvey and Chloe travel through time to try to find the perfect birthday present for Salem.
30	30	"Planet of the Dogs"	John Hoberg	October 9, 1999 (on ABC)
Sabrina brings home a stray dog, Alvin, but shortly starts to disregard it. Alvin finally gets into the Spooky Jar and becomes smarter, then rallies all the dogs in the neighborhood to overthrow the humans.
36	31	"Hex-Change Students"	Sean Abley	October 11, 1999
Two fairy friends from Sabrina's past come to visit. They prank Gem into thinking they are exchange students from Canada and prove to be a bad influence on Sabrina.
34	32	"Saturday Night Furor"	Don Gillies	October 12, 1999
When Quigley imposes that every Saturday is to be "family-fun" night at home, Sabrina tries to get him a girlfriend so she and her aunts can have fun without him.
41	33	"Scare Apparent"	Dennis Haley; Marcy Brown	October 13, 1999
Sabrina befriends a youthful, cowardly bogeyman.
29	34	"The Hex Files"	Savage Steve Holland	October 14, 1999
Sabrina tries to save Quigley's career at the observatory by conjuring up aliens.
33	35	"Stone Broke"	Gary Apple	October 15, 1999
When Gem's parents lose all their assets, she is forced to live at Sabrina's house and eventually reforms her spoilness after her friends abandon her for not being rich anymore.
38	36	"Salem's Plot"	Jan Strnad	October 16, 1999 (on ABC)
When Salem's old friend comes to visit, Salem pretends to be Quigley (and vice versa) to hide the fact that he was turned into a cat as punishment for abusing his magic.
43	37	"Molar Molar"	Savage Steve Holland	October 18, 1999
Afraid of having her wisdom teeth pulled, Sabrina uses magic to remove them instead, but the spell ends up removing her common sense, causing her to say and do stupid things. Meanwhile, Hilda and Zelda try to raise a chickling without the use of magic.
32	38	"Harvzilla"	John Hoberg	October 19, 1999
Harvey fails to make the wrestling team, so Sabrina gives him with Dragon Spray to bulk him up, but too much of the spray causes Harvey to turn into an aggressive dragon.
39	39	"When In Rome"	Ross Maruscak; John Hoberg	October 20, 1999
When Sabrina and Gem are forced to work together on a history report, Gem puts the book they were using inside the Spooky Jar, which transports the two of them and Salem to Ancient Rome.
46	40	"Field of Screams"	John Hoberg; Ross Maruscak	October 21, 1999
Feeling that the children on her softball team can never beat Gem's team, Sabrina recruits several ringers from the Netherworld.
42	41	"Driver Ed"	Glenn Leopold	October 22, 1999
Desperate for Hilda to get her driver's license, Sabrina turns a dog into a handsome driving instructor. However, both Hilda and Zelda fall for him, which puts a strain on their releationship.
35	42	"What Becomes of the Broken Hearted?"	Don Gillies	October 23, 1999 (on ABC)
After getting rejected by her favorite teacher to go on a weekend field trip, Sabrina visits a gnome who challenges her to find someone who has never had his (or her) broken heart and discovers that even self-centered people like Gem, Hilda, Zelda and Salem have been in harm.
40	43	"Send in the Clones"	Thomas Pugsley; Greg Klein	October 25, 1999
Sabrina signs up for more extracurricular activity clubs at school than she can handle, so she creates clones of herself to help deal with the workload.
37	44	"Feats of Clay"	Jan Strnad	October 26, 1999
Sabrina wishes that action hero Devin DeGaulle (a Steven Seagal spoof) would film his next movie in her town so Harvey can meet him, but Harvey becomes disillusioned when Devin DeGaulle turns out to be nothing like his on-screen persona.
45	45	"Generation Zap"	Stewart St. John	October 27, 1999
After Enchantra denies Hilda and Zelda the chance to have their eternal youth spell lifted, Sabrina chastises Enchantra for having an easier life than her, causing a wish crystal in her pocket to prompt a body switch in which Sabrina and Enchantra must learn what it is like to walk in each other's shoes.
55	46	"Board & Sorcery"	Savage Steve Holland	October 28, 1999
While on a skiing trip, Sabrina accidentally turns Harvey into a snowman.
48	47	"Enchanted Vacation"	Jim Gerkin	October 29, 1999
Sabrina, Hilda, Zelda and Salem go on a vacation to the Netherworld, unaware that Tim the Witch Smeller is after them.
49	48	"Moldy Oldie"	Gary Apple	October 30, 1999 (on ABC)
Great Grandpa Gandalf comes to Greendale to renew his witchery license, but the Spellmans do not believe he is up to snuff.
52	49	"Xabrina, Warrior Witch"	Don Gillies	November 1, 1999
When Harvey becomes spell-bounded in a virtual reality video game, Sabrina and Chloe travel into the game to rescue him.
54	50	"Straight Outta Paris"	John Hoberg	November 2, 1999
While visiting to Paris, France, Salem accidentally turn the Eiffel Tower into a human boy, causing a foreign crisis.
51	51	"Strange New World"	Alexx Van Dyne	November 3, 1999
Sabrina transports a young Thomas Edison to the present to help with her science project. However, his absence in the past causes his inventions to start disappearing.
50	52	"Witchery Science Theatre"	Eugene Pack	November 4, 1999
Sabrina gets a haircut, which she is not proud of. To avoid being seen in public, she goes to a theater with Chloe and Harvey, and accidentally transports the three of them into a '50s horror movie.
44	53	"You've Got a Friend"	Josh Stolberg	November 5, 1999
When his favorite animated show gets cancelled, Harvey gets upset, as he takes it as a sign that he is growing up. To cheer him up, Sabrina conjures up Harvey's imaginary friend Mort from a drawing he did when he was five. Mort starts getting Harvey in trouble for playing childish pranks.
53	54	"Hexcalibur"	Glenn Leopold	November 6, 1999 (on ABC)
When Sabrina and Salem accidentally ruin a spellbook of Zelda's which was autographed by Merlin himself, the two of them travel back to the Middle Ages and set out to help a young Merlin become a proper wizard.
57	55	"Brina Baby"	Don Gillies	November 8, 1999
After slacking off too much by having appliances do her homework, Sabrina takes a witch's oath to give up magic and start acting more mature, as well as developing workaholic tendencies, causing her inner child to escape and wreak havoc.
63	56	"Witchwrecked"	John Hoberg	November 9, 1999
Sabrina's class goes on a field trip with no adults or responsibility, with Salem and Newt stowing away with them. Sabrina conjures up a storm that leaves them shipwrecked on an island in the Bermuda Triangle, where her magic will not work. After being stung by a cockatrice, Salem is driven crazy and steals the boat's propeller.
60	57	"Fish Schtick"	Gene Braunstein	November 10, 1999
Sabrina gets jealous when Harvey befriends a new swimming student in school named Dorsala Finn at the same time "Cliche Week" (a week where witches' hackneyed sayings and comparisons come to life) haunts the Spellman house. Wishing she could "swim like a fish" to appeal to Harvey more than Dorsala, Sabrina accidentally turns herself into one.
59	58	"Witchmas Carole"	Sean Abley	November 11, 1999
Angry over Gem Stone's selfish views on Christmas, Sabrina, Hilda and Zelda pose as the Ghosts of Christmas Past, Present and Yet to come in order to scare the holiday spirit into Gem, but the plan goes awry when Gem does not reform.
62	59	"Truth or Scare"	Savage Steve Holland; Kevin Murphy	November 12, 1999
On a class trip in the woods, Sabrina and Gem dare each other into doing foolish things.
61	60	"Generation Hex"	Savage Steve Holland	November 13, 1999 (on ABC)
Sabrina raises money to update the town's library and exceeds her goal by $300, which she uses to outbid her rival Gem Stone in buying a rare collectible Billy-Go-Boom-Boom doll. Despite Pi and Harvey chastising her for using the extra money in the library fund for her own needs, Sabrina justifies her purchase by claiming the extra money is not going to be missed and learns how one person's selfish actions can have negative consequences for everyone else when the Billy-Go-Boom-Boom doll comes to life and takes her 40 years into the future.
64	61	"Working Witches"	Dennis Haley; Marcy Brown	November 15, 1999
Hilda and Zelda get jobs at a medieval-themed, fast-food restaurant to earn money for their own car. When Hilda gets a promotion, she lets her duties go to her head. Meanwhile, Salem wins a radio contest and gets Sabrina to take his place, which she starts to take advantage of it.
65	62	"Wiccan of the Sea"	Savage Steve Holland	November 16, 1999
Wanting a one-hour break from winter, Sabrina, Chloe and Salem use the Spooky Jar to travel to the beach. However, the spell also turns them into mermaids.
58	63	"Key to My Heart"	Jeanmarie Williams	November 17, 1999
Sabrina develops a crush on her piano teacher, but when she learns her piano teacher has a girlfriend, she disrupts his girlfriend's musical talent so she can have him all to herself.
56	64	"La Femme Sabrina"	Kevin Murphy	November 18, 1999
Harvey is unable to wait one more week for a postponed spy movie to get released, so Sabrina uses a spell that unintentionally causes everyone to act like characters in a spy movie.
47	65	"The Bat Pack"	Kevin Murphy; Dan Studney	November 19, 1999
A trio of charming vampire mobsters come to Greendale and befriend Sabrina. While Hilda is less than thrilled, since she was fired from the Bat Pack years ago, Sabrina thinks they are cool, until the trio uses her as a patsy in a blood bank robbery.

== Broadcast ==
=== United States ===
The series originally aired concurrently on UPN (as part of its Disney's One Too weekday morning-afternoon and Sunday block) and on ABC (as part of its Disney's One Saturday Morning block) from September 6 to November 19, 1999; reruns continued to air on ABC until October 13, 2001 (replaced by another DIC program Mary-Kate and Ashley in Action!) and on UPN until September 6, 2002 (replaced by Digimon: Digital Monsters). Around the same time the show was pulled from UPN, the series moved to both Disney Channel (from September 9, 2002 to September 2, 2004) and Toon Disney (from September 3, 2002 to September 5, 2004 before it was replaced by Sabrina's Secret Life). Sabrina: The Animated Series returned to syndication as one of the launch programs broadcast on the Syndicated DIC Kids Network E/I block on September 1, 2003, followed by the spinoff series Sabrina's Secret Life which premiered the following November.

On September 16, 2006, reruns of the series returned to network television as part of CBS' new KOL Secret Slumber Party block and was briefly part of its successor KEWLopolis cartoon lineup until October 27, 2007, when the series along with Trollz were replaced with Sushi Pack and DinoSquad the following Saturday. On September 19, 2009, the series returned to CBS, this time as part of the network's Cookie Jar TV cartoon lineup, later joined by the sequel series, Sabrina's Secret Life on September 18, 2010, before both shows were replaced with Horseland and Trollz on February 5, 2011. Reruns aired on This TV through the "This Is for Kids" block, from September 24, 2012, to October 25, 2013.

From 2017 to 2020, reruns of the series started airing on the Starz multiplex channel Starz Kids & Family; the series was also available to stream on Starz Play. As of 2024, the series is also available on Pluto TV's Rainbow Squad channel.

=== International ===
In Canada, the series aired on Teletoon from October 5, 1999 until December 19, 2003. However, only 51 out of the 65 episodes (the network claimed there was no 23rd episode) aired during the series' first run on the network before being replaced by the sequel series, Sabrina's Secret Life on January 5, 2004. When the series eventually returned to the network on September 6, 2004, the remaining 14 episodes premiered. Reruns of the series would continue until March 4, 2005. The French version of the series Sabrina Apprentie Sorcière, aired on Télétoon in Québec. But unlike the English version, the French version continued to air on the network as late as around 2006 or 2007. The sequel series never aired on the French network. The series also aired on many Disney Channel networks internationally.

Beginning in 2004, many broadcasters who already aired the series began to air it as part of a package with Sabrina's Secret Life titled "Totally Sabrina." The package was pre-sold to TF1 in France, RTÉ in Ireland, Mediaset in Italy, ORF in Austria, Alter Channel in Greece, FORTA in Spain, SBT in Brazil, Super RTL in Germany, Arutz Hayeladim in Israel and Saran in Turkey, in addition to Disney Channel and Toon Disney networks in the United Kingdom, Asia, Taiwan, Australia, France, Latin America, Brazil, the Middle East and Spain.

The series also aired on Cartoon Network in India and Pop Girl in the UK.

== Home media ==
=== United States ===
In February 2001, DIC announced the formation of their home video subsidiary DIC Home Entertainment, and that Sabrina: The Animated Series would be one of the shows from their catalogue released through the division.

VHS/DVD name	Episodes	Distributor	Release date	Extras
Sabrina's World (DVD)	You Said a Mouse-Ful; A Tail of Two Kitties; Key to My Heart; What Becomes of the Broken Hearted?	Lions Gate Home Entertainment; Trimark Home Video	August 28, 2001	Trailers; Trivia Game
Sabrina in Love (VHS)	Key to My Heart; What Becomes of the Broken Hearted?	Lions Gate Home Entertainment; Trimark Home Video	August 28, 2001	Trailers
Salem's World (VHS)	You Said a Mouse-Ful; A Tail of Two Kitties	Lions Gate Home Entertainment; Trimark Home Video	August 28, 2001	Trailers
Witch in Training	Shrink to Fit; Strange New World; The Importance of Being Norma	Sterling Entertainment; NCircle Entertainment	May 25, 2004 (Sterling); March 6, 2007 (NCircle)	Trailers (DVD only); Bonus episode Anywhere but Here (DVD only)
Bat Attack!	Nothin' Says Lovin' Like Somethin' From a Coven; Witchery Science Theatre; The Bat Pack	Sterling Entertainment; NCircle Entertainment	August 31, 2004 (Sterling); August 21, 2007 (NCircle)	Trailers (DVD only); Bonus episode Field of Screams (DVD only)
A Witchmas Carol	Witchmas Carole; Board and Sorcery; Has Anybody Seen my Quigley?	Sterling Entertainment; NCircle Entertainment	August 31, 2004 (Sterling); October 23, 2007 (NCircle)	Trailers (DVD only); Bonus episode The Grandparent Trap (DVD only)
The Very Best of Sabrina: The Animated Series	Disc 1 Witch Switch; Nothin' Says Lovin' Like; Somethin' From a Coven; Wag the Witch; Most Dangerous Witch; Stage Fright; Witchy Grrrls; Documagicary; Disc 2 This Is Your Nine Lives; Stone Broke; When In Rome; Molar Molar; Xabrina, Warrior Witch; La Femme Sabrina; Wiccan of the Sea	Shout! Factory	October 17, 2006	Trailers
Sabrina: The Animated Series – A Touch of Magic!	Shrink to Fit; Boy Meets Bike; When in Rome; You Said a Mouse-Ful; Boogie Shoes; Stone Broke; Anywhere But Here; Nothin' Says Lovin' Like; Somethin' From a Coven; I Got Glue Babe; Wag the Witch	Mill Creek Entertainment	February 15, 2011	Trailers; A Midsummer's Nightmare from Sabrina's Secret Life
Sabrina: The Animated Series – Volume 1	Disc 1 Shrink to Fit; Boy Meets Bike; The Importance of Being Norma; You Said a Mouse-Ful; Boogie Shoes; Witch Switch; Anywhere But Here; Nothin' Says Lovin' Like; Somethin' From a Coven; I Got Glue Babe; Wag the Witch; Disc 2 Most Dangerous Witch; Picture Perfect; Has Anybody Seen My Quigley? Extreme Harvey; Stage Fright; The Senses-Shattering Adventures of Captain Harvtastic; Once Upon a Whine; Field Trippin; Witchy Grrrls; My Stepmother the Babe; Documagicary; Disc 3 The Grandparent Trap; Upside Down Town; Paranormal Pi; This Is Your Nine Lives; No Time To Be A Hero; Absence Of Malissa; Tail of Two Kitties; The Hex Files; Planet of the Dogs; Witchitis; Harvzilla	Mill Creek Entertainment	February 15, 2011	Trailers; A Midsummer's Nightmare from Sabrina's Secret Life (Disc 1)

=== International ===
In the Philippines, Viva Video and Cookie Jar Entertainment released a few DVD sets in the countries.

In the United Kingdom, budget distributor Prism Leisure and Fremantle Home Entertainment released "Sabrina in Love" and "Salem's World" on DVD which had the same 2 episodes as the US VHS releases respectively, but including an additional episode. An exclusive UK DVD titled "Witchy Girls" was also released in the same year, also containing 3 episodes.

=== Streaming ===
Tubi has the entire series available for streaming, with the exception of the following episodes (most of which aired on ABC and were most likely omitted due to licensing issues): "Witch Switch," "Has Anybody Seen My Quigley," "Once Upon a Whine," "The Importance of Being Norma," "Witchitis," "Absence of Malissa," "Planet of the Dogs," "Scare Apparent," "Salem's Plot," "What Becomes of the Broken-Hearted?," "Moldy Oldie," "Truth or Scare," and "Generation Hex" (because of the similar-sounding titles, "Generation Zap" appears on Tubi in place of "Generation Hex" as the 60th episode rather than the 45th).

== Reception ==
Common Sense Media gave the series a three out of five stars and said, "Parents need to know that this tween cartoon -- a spin-off of the live-action sitcom Sabrina, the Teenage Witch -- features similar lighthearted witch humor. Storylines focus on the trials and tribulations of being a tween: friendships, school assignments, and dealing with increasing responsibility. Many of the characters set positive examples of what it means to be a good friend."

== Merchandise ==
Viacom Consumer Products and DIC Entertainment co-released merchandise based on the series.

An 11-inch Sabrina fashion doll was released by the company Play Along. Several other small plastic toys, including a few figurines and a Polly Pocket-esque Sabrina doll were sold in stores while the series was in production.

In September 2002, Simon & Schuster UK published tie-in books based on some of the episodes, A Tail of Two Kitties, Hexcalibur, Brina Baby, and I Got Glue Babe. The only new original books published were Sabrina's Bindi Magic (the only story not based on any episode of the series) and Sabrina Through the Year.

=== Video games ===
In August 2000, through Viacom Consumer Products and their video game division Simon & Schuster Interactive, it was announced that Knowledge Adventure had secured the rights to publish video games based on the series.

The first title, Sabrina The Animated Series: Magical Adventure, was released for the Microsoft Windows and Macintosh computer systems in October 2000. The game is a minigame collection which centers on Sabrina going on a quest into the Greendale Mall to retrieve her missing "dream come true" amulet, which Gem Stone is using to turn people into sheep.

The second title, Sabrina: The Animated Series - Zapped! was announced in August 2000 and released on November 22 for the Game Boy Color. Developed by WayForward Technologies, the game is a 2D platformer where Sabrina and Salem help reverse an animal-transformation spell that the former accidentally created.

On September 4, 2001, another Game Boy Color title - Sabrina: The Animated Series - Spooked, was announced. It was released on November 6, 2001. Developed by WayForward Technologies, like its predecessor, the game centers on Sabrina and Salem saving Hilda and Zelda after the Spookie Jar goes out of control, stealing the magic from witches and warlocks.

In July 2025, it was announced that Zapped! would be re-released by ModRetro, a video game company owned by Palmer Luckey which manufactures Game Boy Color-clone consoles. The re-release garnered controversy due to Luckey's political views, with WayForward initially stating that Archie Comics was responsible for the deal with Palmer, and that they would not be receiving any royalties for each unit sold. However, the company soon deleted their claims, which led to the belief that WayForward was the one who signed the deal. The game's reissue was released onto ModRetro's website later that month.

== Spin-offs ==
=== Cancelled Salem spin-off ===
In November 2000, following their separation and re-independence from Disney, DIC Entertainment announced they would produce a spin-off based on Salem the Cat, simply titled Salem. The series was planned to have 52 half-hour episodes, each budgeted at $275,000 to $325,000, and would air in the Fall of 2001, with DIC holding all worldwide distribution rights. The series never saw the light the day after its initial announcement, meaning it likely never got off the drawing board.

The series would have focused on Salem's attempts to become a warlock again by proceeding to do enough good deeds but lets his attitude and wit get the better of him.

=== Sabrina: Friends Forever ===
A TV movie, titled Sabrina: Friends Forever aired on Nickelodeon in the United States on October 13, 2002, as part of the Nickelodeon Sunday Movie Toons series of television movies. The movie was later pre-sold internationally to various Disney Channel networks, among others.

The movie centers on Sabrina going to Witch Academy to become full witch, but is unsure if she will be accepted due to being half-witch, until she meets Nicole, a girl who is also half-witch like she is.

=== Sabrina's Secret Life ===
A sequel series, titled Sabrina's Secret Life was co-produced with DIC's French subsidiary Les Studios Tex and broadcaster TF1, and premiered on DIC's syndicated television block DIC Kids Network in November 2003 before being pre-sold internationally.

The series centers on a 14-year-old Sabrina attending High School and also attending special witch classes with rival Cassandra, who unlike Sabrina, is a full-witch.

=== Comic book series ===
While Sabrina: The Animated Series was airing, Archie Comics printed a comic spin-off for the show. The first issue was dated January 2000 (meaning it was on-sale in late 1999), and it lasted for 37 issues. In order to tie the plot in with their Sabrina series, it was stated in the first issue that Repulsa the Goblin Gueen had sent Sabrina back in time to relive her pre-teen years, so that she would be out of the way while Repulsa attempted to conquer Enchantra's realm. In issue 38, the Repulsa plot was resolved, and the comic book returned to chronicling the teenage Sabrina in the next issue.

== See also ==
- List of animated spin-offs from prime time shows
