= Nine Dead =

- Film poster
- Directed by: Chris Shadley
- Written by: Patrick Wehe Mahoney
- Produced by: Nick Thurlow; Paula Hart
- Starring: Melissa Joan Hart; John Terry; Chip Bent; Lawrence Turner; Edrick Browne; John Cates; Marc Macaulay
- Music by: Danny Lux
- Distributed by: New Line Cinema
- Release date: November 6, 2009
- Running time: 98 minutes
- Country: United States
- Language: English
- Budget: $2,000,000

Nine Dead is a 2009 American horror thriller film, directed by Chris Shadley, produced by Paula Hart and written by Patrick Wehe Mahoney. Filming began on July 6, 2008 and ended on July 27, 2008. The film spent several months without a distributor before being picked up by New Line Cinema and having a limited U.S. release on November 6, 2009. The film was released on DVD on March 9, 2010.

== Plot ==
The nine characters are revealed to be:

1. Christian – a petty criminal
2. Jackson – a police officer
3. Leon – an illegal gun seller
4. Sully – a strip club owner and loan shark
5. Kelley – an Assistant District Attorney for LA County
6. Coogan – a pedophile and rapist
7. Father Francis – a priest
8. Eddie – a health insurance executive
9. Nhung Chan – a Chinese store owner who does not know English

After a string of kidnappings, these nine people are locked inside a room and handcuffed to pipes. Then a masked man enters and explains each of them is there for a reason, and to survive, they must figure out how they are all connected. He further explains that he will kill one of them every ten minutes until they figure it out. The kidnapper leaves and a countdown begins. The group begins introducing themselves, and a few early connections are made. Christian says he once borrowed money from Sully but paid it back. Coogan mentions he has been in multiple prisons. Kelley and Jackson are former lovers. Just as the group begins to think it is all a hoax, the kidnapper enters and shoots Christian.

After the masked man leaves, Leon has Sully stomp on his hand until it breaks, freeing himself from his handcuffs. He attempts to escape, but is caught and brought back by the shooter. The shooter then kills Coogan, who had mentioned earlier that he is dying anyway. The shooter whispers the reason in Coogan's ear, prompting Coogan to attack him before being shot. The shooter tells Leon he will be the next to die.

With seven people left, Mrs. Chan recognizes Kelley as her former lawyer after her store was robbed two years earlier. The group begins to see connections between themselves and the robber, Wade Greeley. The shooter returns, but as the seven only know part of the story, he shoots Leon. With the theory in doubt, it becomes clear that Father Francis knows more than he is admitting, but refuses to give further information. Eventually, it is determined that Greeley did not rob the store; the real robber, Christian, confessed to Father Francis that he committed the robbery to pay back Sully. However, when shown a line-up, Mrs. Chan mistakenly identified Greeley as the robber, and Kelley prosecuted him.

At this point, the shooter reenters, and since not all of the connections have been established, he tries to kill Eddie, but Father Francis puts himself in the path of the bullet and is killed instead. When Kelley identifies the shooter as Wade, he denies this and leaves. Once the shooter leaves, Sully realizes that before Christian robbed Mrs. Chan's store, he didn't have a gun, and must have bought one from Leon. The shooter enters and targets Mrs. Chan; instead of whispering the reason to her, he hands her a note written in Chinese. She pleads with him in Chinese before being shot. Kelley begs him to let her go to be with her son, but the shooter angrily berates Kelley for using her son as an excuse, and leaves, but not before hinting Jackson is the father of Kelley's baby.

Kelley confirms that Jackson is the father of her son, and also reveals she fabricated evidence to convict Greeley, saying she needed to win a case after many losses. She also reveals that Jackson unknowingly helped her falsify evidence, and that she once killed a man in self-defense who had raped her, and swept it under the rug when the rapist's body was found. Eddie realizes the shooter must be Greeley's father, exacting revenge, and the remaining four begin to wonder what happened to Greeley after he went to prison. The shooter returns and kills Sully, who has no remorse for his actions.

With only Kelley, Jackson, and Eddie left, the three struggle to establish connections for Eddie and Coogan. Eddie supposes that Coogan was earlier referring to being infected with AIDS (since he mentioned the others being harmed by "blood splatter"), and, as he has been in multiple prisons, could have raped Greeley and infected him. Then the final connection is made; Greeley applied for an experimental drug treatment for HIV from Eddie's company, but Eddie would have had to reject him due to his criminal conviction. They explain this to the shooter, Greeley's father, who removes his mask and agrees to let them all go. Kelley is released, but, having slowly revealed her true nature, steals the gun and shoots Greeley's father, Eddie, and Jackson. Greeley's father, who was wearing a kevlar vest, recovers momentarily to reveal that the whole time "everybody has been watching" and that they now know "who the real Kelley Murphy is". He is then shot in the head, and Kelley escapes as the police arrive.

== Cast ==
- Melissa Joan Hart as Kelley Murphy
- John Terry as Shooter
- Chip Bent as Sully Fenton
- Lawrence Turner as Coogan
- Edrick Browne as Leon
- John Cates as Christian Collingsworth
- Marc Macaulay as Father Michael Francis
- Lucille Soong as Nhung Chan
- James C. Victor as Eddie Vigoda
- William Lee Scott as Dean Jackson
- Emily Hart as York
- Gina St. John as Anchor-woman

== Release ==
The first stills from the film were released onto the film's official MySpace page on August 17, 2008. The poster was released onto the official website on March 3, 2009.

The film had a limited release on November 6, 2009 and was set to be released on DVD on March 9, 2010.

The first teaser trailer was released onto the film's official website; that trailer is less than a minute long. The full-length 2-3 minute long trailer is now available on the Fabrication Films official website.

The film was available to watch instantly on Netflix as of September 2013. Netflix ceased streaming of this movie on June 30, 2014.

The film is available to watch instantly on iTunes.

== Reception ==
Justin Felix of DVD Talk said, "I liked all but about 30 seconds of what I saw here, but I suspect I'm not the only one who'll watch this film and feel let down by the silly and incomplete final ending to this movie. Eh. I'll give it a mild recommendation - and encourage everyone to just press "stop" on their DVD players after the killer unmasks himself and reveals the final pieces of the puzzle. This is where the movie should have ended."
