= The Right Connections =

1997/us television film by Chuck Vinson

- Screenplay by: Paul Bernbaum
- Directed by: Chuck Vinson
- Starring: M.C. Hammer; Elizabeth Hart; Brian Hart; Emily Hart; Alexandra Hart-Gilliams; Belinda Metz; Meshach Taylor; Melissa Joan Hart
- Composer: Michael Colombier
- Country of origin: United States
- Original language: English

Production
- Executive producers: Paula Hart; Paul Bernbaum
- Editor: Christopher Ellis
- Running time: 95 minutes
- Production companies: Once and Future Films; Shaken, Not Stirred Productions; Hartbreak Films; Viacom Productions

Original release
- Network: Showtime
- Release: August 15, 1997

The Right Connections is a 1997 American television film directed by Chuck Vinson and starring Melissa Joan Hart and her four real life siblings. The film premiered on August 15, 1997, on Showtime.

== Plot ==
A rap singer helps four siblings form a singing group to win a talent contest in order to raise money to help pay their mother's tax bill.

== Cast ==
- M.C. Hammer as Kendrick Bragg
- Melissa Joan Hart as Melanie Cambridge
- Elizabeth Hart as Jamie Tompkins
- Brian Hart as Chase Tompkins
- Emily Hart as Marnie Tompkins
- Alexandra Hart-Gilliams as Kaila Tompkins
- Belinda Metz as Gail Tompkins, the widowed mother of Jamie, Chase, Marnie & Kaila
- Meshach Taylor as Lionel Clark
- fr:Scott Vickaryous as Eric Landau
- JR Bourne : Douglas Freeman
