= Mute (2005 film) =

- Directed by: Melissa Joan Hart
- Written by: Kristin Lipiro
- Starring: Emily Hart; Emily Deschanel; Dylan Neal
- Cinematography: Francis dela Torre
- Edited by: Don Koch
- Music by: Ryan Adison Amen
- Production company: Hartfisch Productions
- Release date: September 21, 2005 (Palm Springs International Short Film Festival)
- Running time: 15 minutes
- Country: United States
- Language: English

Mute is a 2005 short film by Melissa Joan Hart and is her directorial debut. The film was first released at the Palm Springs International Festival of Short Films on September 21, 2005, and stars her sister Emily Hart as Eileen, a woman determined to get revenge on her sister.

== Synopsis ==
Eileen (Emily Hart) is a deaf-mute that is sabotaging her sister Claire's (Emily Deschanel) wedding out of a sense of retribution. She believes that Claire is responsible for the accident that left her unable to hear or talk, as Eileen had previously had an affair with her sister's fiancee, James (Dylan Neal). James refuses to believe that his future wife could be capable of such an act, which prompts Eileen's attempt at revenge.

== Cast ==
- Emily Hart as Eileen
- Emily Deschanel as Claire
- Dylan Neal as James
- Garry Marshall as Pastor
- Carlease Burke as Translator
- Julie Albert as Violinist
- Matt Boren as Cameraman
- Bob Davidson as Dad
- Jacob Jackson as Ring Bearer
- Kristin Lipiro as Bartender

== Reception ==
The Baltimore Sun gave a mixed review for Mute, stating that Hart "makes some unimaginative directorial choices, she does sustain the creepy mood, so the squalid little story could prove to be a successful jumping-off point for a career directing noirs."
