= Emily Hart =

American actress (born 1986)

- Born: Emily Anne Hart; May 2, 1986 (age 40); Smithtown, New York, U.S.
- Occupation: Actress
- Years active: 1994–2009; 2021
- Spouse: Alex Madar (m. 2013)
- Children: 2
- Parent: Paula Hart (mother)
- Relatives: Melissa Joan Hart (sister)

Emily Anne Hart (born May 2, 1986) is an American former actress. She is the younger sister of actress Melissa Joan Hart and is best known for her roles as Amanda Wiccan in Sabrina the Teenage Witch and Sabrina Spellman in Sabrina: The Animated Series.

== Biography ==
Hart is a daughter of television producer Paula Hart (née Voje) and William Hart, a businessman. She has six sisters (three of whom are half-sisters) and one brother. Her stepfather (since 1994) is television executive Leslie Gilliams, who competed on Season 5 of the American version of MasterChef in 2014, finishing in 3rd place. Her older siblings Melissa, Trisha, Elizabeth, and Brian Hart have all been in show business to varying degrees, as have younger half-sisters Alexandra Gilliams, Samantha Gilliams, and Mackenzie Hart.

Hart started acting influenced by her older sister Melissa. In 1994, she played 4-year-old Tommy in the Broadway production of The Who's Tommy. In 1998, she won a Young Artist Award for her role in the television movie The Right Connections. She was also nominated that year for a guest appearance on the series Sabrina the Teenage Witch, in which her sister Melissa Joan Hart starred. A later episode of that series, entitled "Witchright Hall", served as a backdoor pilot for a possible spin-off series starring Hart as Sabrina's younger cousin Amanda, but the show was not picked up by The WB.

In 1999, Hart was cast in the title role of Sabrina: The Animated Series while her older sister Melissa co-starred as Hilda and Zelda Spellman, for which she was nominated for the Young Artist Awards in 2000 and 2001, winning the second of the two. Also in 2001, Hart starred as the teenaged Shirley Temple in the TV movie Child Star: The Story of Shirley Temple. In 2003, she won another Young Artist Award for a guest appearance on the series Sabrina the Teenage Witch.

In 2005, Hart starred in the short film Mute, which was directed by her older sister Melissa. In 2009 she played York in the horror thriller film Nine Dead, which also featured her older sister Melissa. She was the narrator for the 2016 audio book Things I Can't Explain: A Clarissa Novel.

== Filmography ==
=== Film ===
Year	Title	Role	Notes
1996	If Lucy Fell	Eddy	
2000	The Little Mermaid II: Return to the Sea	Mergirl #1 (voice)	Direct to video
2004	Raising Helen	Audrey's friend	
2005	Mute	Eileen	Short film
2009	Nine Dead	York	

=== Television ===
Year	Title	Role	Notes
1996–2003	Sabrina the Teenage Witch	Amanda / Young Sabrina Spellman	8 episodes Recurring role (Seasons 1–7)
1997	The Right Connections	Marnie Tompkins	Television film
1998	Silencing Mary	Bobbi Stuartson	Television film
1999	Sabrina: The Animated Series	Sabrina Spellman (voice)	65 episodes Lead role
2000	So Weird	Phoebe Kelsey	Episode: "Snapshot"
2000	Santa Mouse and the Ratdeer	Rosie (voice)	Television special
2001	Child Star: The Shirley Temple Story	Shirley Temple	Television film
2021	Hell's Kitchen	Herself	Uncredited chef's table guest diner for the red team; Episode: "More Than a Sticky Situation"

=== Video game ===
Year	Title	Role	Notes
2000	Sabrina: The Animated Series: Magical Adventure	Sabrina Spellman	

=== Stage ===
Year	Title	Role	Location
1994	The Who's Tommy	Tommy	

== Awards and nominations ==
Year	Award	Category	Nominated work	Result
1998	Young Artist Awards	Best Performance in a TV Comedy Series - Guest Starring Young Actress	Sabrina the Teenage Witch	Nominated
1998	Young Artist Awards	Best Performance in a TV Movie or Feature Film - Young Ensemble (shared with the cast)	The Right Connections	Won
2000	Young Artist Awards	Best Performance in a Voice-Over (TV or Feature Film) - Young Actress	Sabrina: The Animated Series	Nominated
2001	Young Artist Awards	Best Performance in a Voice-Over: TV/Film/Video - Young Actress	Sabrina: The Animated Series	Won
2003	Young Artist Awards	Best Performance in a TV Series (Comedy or Drama) - Supporting Young Actress	Sabrina the Teenage Witch	Won

Awards and achievements
Young Artist Award
Preceded by Aria Noelle Curzon for Dan Danger	Best Performance in a Voice-Over Role - Young Actress for Sabrina: The Animated Series; 2001	Succeeded by None
Preceded by None	Best Performance in a TV Series (Comedy or Drama) - Supporting Young Actress for Sabrina, the Teenage Witch; 2003	Succeeded by Mackenzie Rosman for 7th Heaven
