= Paula Hart =

American television and movie producer (born 1956)

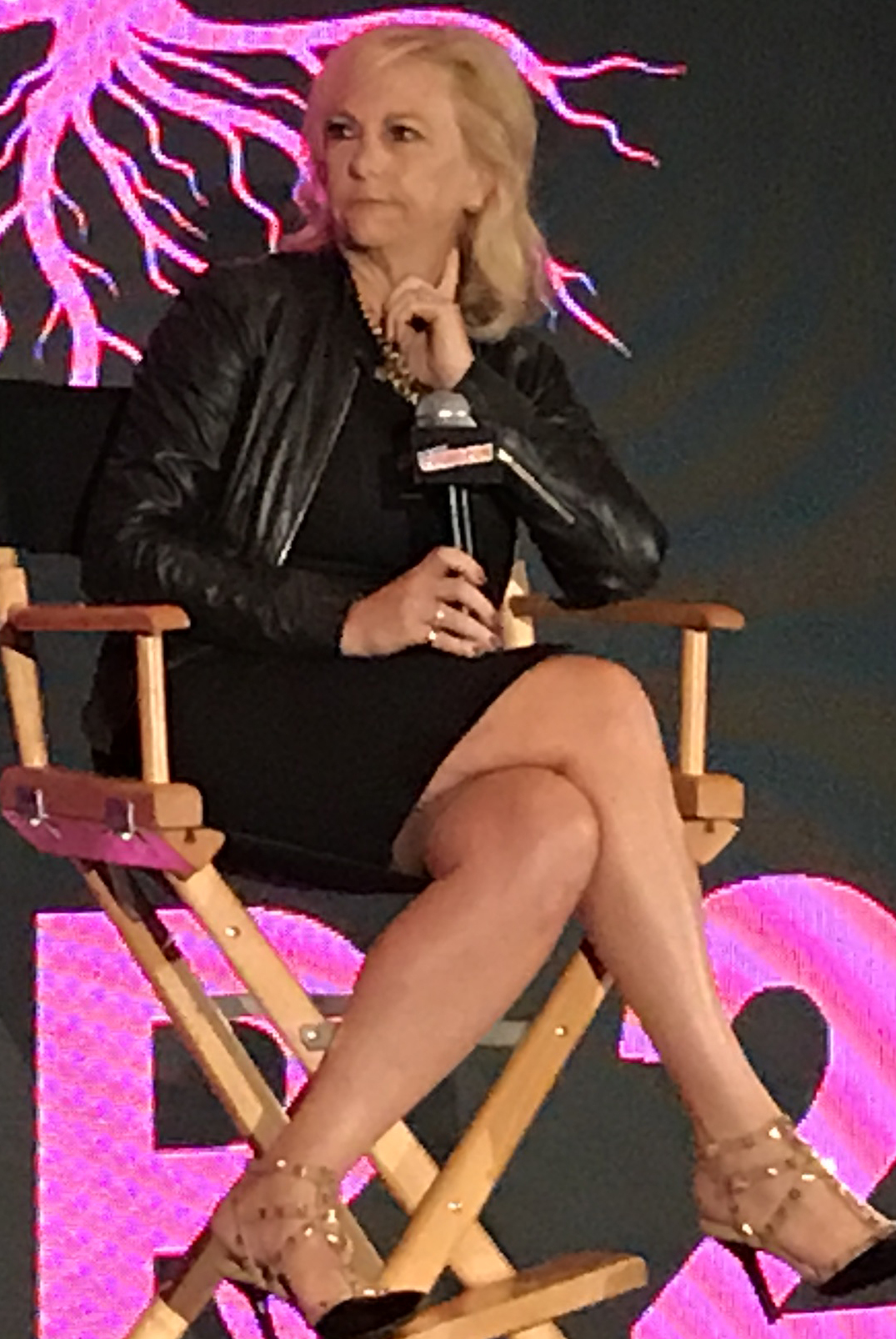
- Hart in 2017
- Born: Paula Joan Voje; April 25, 1956 (age 69); New Jersey, U.S.
- Occupation: Producer
- Years active: 1996–present
- Spouses: William Hart (m. 1972; div. 1990) Leslie Gilliams (m. 1994)
- Children: 7, including Melissa Joan and Emily

Paula Hart (born Paula Joan Voje; April 25, 1956) is an American producer. She is a principal of Hartbreak Films, along with one of her daughters, actress Melissa Joan Hart.

Her work includes production credits for Sabrina the Teenage Witch, and two television movies on the Lifetime Network, The Watcher in the Woods (2017) and A Very Merry Toy Store (2017); Hart also served as director of the latter.

== Personal life ==
On February 6, 1972, Hart married a shellfish wholesaler, William Hart and divorced in 1990. Together, they have five children, including Melissa Joan Hart and Emily Hart.

On September 18, 1994, Hart married Leslie Gilliams, who later competed on season 5 of the American version of MasterChef in 2014, finishing in 3rd place. Together, they have two children.

In September 2010, Hart and Gilliams purchased an estate in Malibu, California for $2.6 million USD.

== Filmography ==
Movie and Television roles
| Year | Title | Role | Notes |
|---|---|---|---|
| 1996 | Sabrina the Teenage Witch | Executive producer | TV movie |
| 1996-2003 | Sabrina the Teenage Witch | Executive producer (137 episodes) | TV series |
| 1997 | Doom Runners | Executive producer | TV movie |
| 1997 | Two Came Back | Executive producer | TV movie |
| 1997 | The Right Connections | Executive producer | TV movie |
| 1998 | Sabrina Goes to Rome | Executive producer | TV movie |
| 1998 | Silencing Mary | Executive producer | TV movie |
| 1999 | Sabrina Down Under | Executive producer | TV movie |
| 1999 | Sabrina: The Animated Series | Executive producer (65 episodes) | TV series |
| 2000 | Up, Up and Away | Executive producer | TV movie |
| 2001 | Child Star: The Shirley Temple Story | Executive producer | TV movie |
| 2002 | The Scream Team | Executive producer | TV movie |
| 2003 | Tying the Knot: The Wedding of Melissa Joan Hart | Executive producer | TV documentary |
| 2005 | Mute | Executive producer | Short |
| 2009 | My Fake Fiancé | Executive producer | TV movie |
| 2010 | Nine Dead | Producer | Movie |
| 2010-2015 | Melissa & Joey | Executive producer (104 episodes) | TV series |
| 2013 | Grounded | Executive producer | TV movie |
| 2014 | Santa Con | Producer | Movie |
| 2016 | Broadcasting Christmas | Producer | TV movie |
| 2017 | A Very Merry Toy Store | Executive producer | TV movie |
| 2017 | The Watcher in the Woods | Producer | TV movie |
| 2019 | A Reservation for Christmas | Executive producer | TV movie |
