= Ambrose Spellman =

Fictional character in Chilling Adventures of Sabrina

- Chilling Adventures of Sabrina character
- Chance Perdomo as Ambrose Spellman
- First appearance: "Chapter One: October Country" (2018)
- Last appearance: "Chapter Thirty-Six: At the Mountains of Madness" (2020)
- Created by: Roberto Aguirre-Sacasa
- Based on: Archie Comics
- Portrayed by: Chance Perdomo (Chilling Adventures of Sabrina)
- Voiced by: Andrew Francis (Sabrina: Secrets of a Teenage Witch)

In-universe information
- Species: Warlock
- Gender: Male
- Occupation: Occultist; Mortician; Librarian
- Family: Sabrina Spellman (cousin); Zelda Spellman (aunt); Hilda Spellman (aunt)
- Religion: Church of Night
- Nationality: British

Ambrose Spellman is a fictional character appearing in the Archie Comics series Chilling Adventures of Sabrina, inspiring the Netflix series of the same name. Of British and African descent, he resides in Greendale's Spellman Mortuary with his cousin Sabrina Spellman and her aunts, Hilda and Zelda. Known for his magical prowess, and due to a binding spell, he had been trapped in Spellman Mortuary for 75 years until being released by Father Blackwood. Ambrose mentors Sabrina and guides her through the ways of being half-witch.

Ambrose uses his knowledge of the occult, especially in spellcasting and necromancy, to fight against supernatural threats. He is a very powerful warlock and a key member of the Spellman family. He is an old warlock who moved from university to university seeking comfort in a father figure after the witch hunters killed his father.

Chance Perdomo plays Ambrose in the television adaptations of Chilling Adventures of Sabrina (2018-20), to critical acclaim. Created for the show by Roberto Aguirre-Sacasa after Perdomo auditioned for the role of Reggie on Riverdale, Ambrose proved one of the series' breakout characters, and earned Perdomo a BAFTA Breakthrough Brit in 2019.

== Character background ==
Ambrose Spellman is a warlock of British and African American descent, originally from England and a member of the Spellman family of witches, who appears as a young man in his twenties due to his magical longevity. He was raised by his Aunt Hilda following the death of his father, who was killed by warlocks during Ambrose's childhood.

He was confined to the Spellman Mortuary and sentenced to house arrest by the Witches' Council for 75 years due to a binding spell placed on him after his arrest for attempting to bomb the Vatican, In the late 19th century, an act inspired by his association with Aleister Crowley and revolutionary ideas. During this time, he becomes the family's resident occult expert and assists his aunts Hilda and Zelda in their funeral home, while also mentoring his cousin Sabrina Spellman in her magical pursuits.

== Portrayal ==
Ambrose is portrayed by actor Chance Perdomo, whose performance has been praised for its charisma and complexity. Initially auditioning for the role of Jughead Jones in Riverdale, Perdomo was later cast as Ambrose by showrunner Roberto Aguirre-Sacasa, who created the character specifically for the Netflix adaptation.

=== Role in Chilling Adventures of Sabrina ===
In Chilling Adventures of Sabrina, Ambrose serves as a mentor and confidant to Sabrina, offering guidance on witchcraft and navigating her dual life as a half-witch. His extensive knowledge of occult practices, makes him a valuable ally in combating supernatural threats. Despite his confinement, Ambrose participates in the series' darker and humorous moments, often delivering witty commentary or engaging in hexes.

Ambrose's storyline includes his romantic involvement with a warlock named Luke and his ongoing battle with feelings of isolation. His character is portrayed with a melancholic tone that contributes to his overall complexity. Over the course of the series, Ambrose gains more autonomy after being released from a binding spell by Father Blackwood.

== Reception ==
Ambrose Spellman has been widely regarded as a standout character in the series. Critics have praised his wit, charm, and the inclusion of a pansexual character as a step forward for LGBTQ+ representation in mainstream television. His dynamic with other characters, particularly Prudence Night and Sabrina, has been lauded as one of the emotional cores of the series. Vulture describe him as a "mysterious brooding warlock" whose scenes leave a lingering atmospheric impact. Perdomo's performance has been lauded for elevating Ambrose beyond a supporting role, making him a standout in the ensemble cast.

Perdomo's portrayal earned him recognition as a 2019 BAFTA Breakthrough Brit, and a Screen International Star of Tomorrow.

== Character traits and powers ==
Ambrose is highly educated in ancient languages, occult sciences, necromancy, and other magical disciplines. His pansexuality is portrayed casually and respectfully, and he is romantically involved with both male and female characters over the course of the series. Despite his initial confinement, Ambrose eventually earns his freedom and becomes one of the most powerful allies in Sabrina's war against supernatural threats.
