= Sabrina's Secret Life =

2003 animated television series

- French: Le Secret de Sabrina
- Based on: Sabrina the Teenage Witch by: George Gladir; Dan DeCarlo
- Developed by: Jean Chalopin
- Directed by: Pascal Gaugry
- Starring: Britt McKillip; Maurice LaMarche; Alexandra Collins; Christopher Gaze; Jane Mortifee; Michael Heyward; Moneca Stori; Shannon Chan-Kent; Tifanie Chaney; Vanesa Tomasino
- Opening theme: "Who's Makin' Magic?"
- Ending theme: "Who's Makin' Magic?" (Instrumental)
- Composer: Jean-Michel Guirao
- Countries of origin: France; United States
- Original languages: English; French
- No. of seasons: 1
- No. of episodes: 26

Production
- Executive producers: Andy Heyward; Michael Maliani; Claude Ravier; Michael I. Siberkleit; Richard H. Goldwater
- Producer: Chuck Grimes
- Running time: 22 minutes
- Production companies: Archie Comics Entertainment, LLC; Les Studios Tex SARL; DIC Entertainment Corporation
- Budget: $9.1 million ($350,000 per episode)

Original release
- Network: Syndication (DIC Kids Network) (United States); TF1 (France)
- Release: November 10, 2003 – February 3, 2004

Related
- Sabrina: Friends Forever

Sabrina's Secret Life (French: Le Secret de Sabrina) is a 2003 animated television series based on the Archie Comics character Sabrina, the Teenage Witch co-produced by DIC Entertainment Corporation and Les Studios Tex SARL. It originally aired in syndication on the DIC Kids Network block in 2003 as a sequel series to Sabrina: The Animated Series (and Sabrina: Friends Forever). This was the final series to be produced by Les Studios Tex, as they ceased operations around the time the show ended. It was one of the only two DIC series company founder Jean Chalopin was involved with after selling his shares in 1987 (the other being Gadget and the Gadgetinis).

== Overview ==
In this series, Sabrina Spellman is 14 years old (two years older than she was in Sabrina: The Animated Series and one year older than she was in the Friends Forever movie, but still younger than usually portrayed in the comics) attending Greendale High School. Chloe and her family have moved away, Gem Stone attends a private school far away from Greendale and Uncle Quigley, Pi and the Spookie Jar have mysteriously vanished. Sabrina's new best friend is a girl named Maritza; additionally, Sabrina still has a crush on her friend Harvey. Although Sabrina's Secret Life is set during her high school years, Sabrina's magic is considerably less strong than it was in the original series. Unlike the previous series, where Sabrina made magic with a wave of her hand and an incantation, here she uses a wand to cast spells. Most of the original voice cast did not return for this series.

== Characters ==
- Sabrina Spellman (voiced by Britt McKillip, reprising her role from Friends Forever) is a 14-year-old freshman at Greendale High and had grown and matured since Sabrina: The Animated Series ended. She secretly has her courses of magic and witchcraft with Cassandra. Her character and personality are still the same and she still has her crush on Harvey. She also wears a different midriff dress than the previous series. She is now into different hobbies for her age like basketball, soccer, skateboarding, listening to rock music, and trying her hardest in the Netherworld.
- Salem Saberhagen (voiced by Maurice LaMarche) did not change in this series, as he still helps Sabrina with her problems. He has also taken over Uncle Quigley's role as the voice of reason for Sabrina.
- Hilda Spellman and Zelda Spellman (voiced by Moneca Stori, reprising her role from Friends Forever and Tifanie Christun) are Sabrina's paternal aunts who help their niece with her increasingly powerful magical abilities and proper uses of magic.
- Harvey Kinkle (voiced by Michael Heyward) is portrayed as more grown-up, attractive, athletic and smarter but, at the same time, much ditzier than in the original series. He has the same crush on Sabrina and still does not know her magical secret.
- Cassandra (voiced by Tifanie Christun, credited as Tifanie Chaney) is Enchantra's niece and Sabrina's best friend-turned-enemy who goes to the same witchcraft courses as Sabrina. In the beginning, she served as Gem Stone's replacement, but she gets kinder progressively. In the end, she and Sabrina become best friends again.
- Maritza (voiced by Vanesa Tomasino) is Sabrina's new best friend and Chloe's replacement. She's very similar to Chloe physically and emotionally but, unlike her, she does not know that Sabrina is a witch.
- Queen Enchantra (voiced by Jane Mortifee, reprising her role from Friends Forever) is the Queen of all witches. She is portrayed as much warmer, friendlier, nicer and kinder than she was in Sabrina: The Animated Series.
- Miss. Magrooney (voiced by Jane Mortifee) is Sabrina's teacher in both the Human World and The Netherworld.
- Mr. Snipe (voiced by Christopher Gaze) is Sabrina's teacher in both the Human World and The Netherworld.
- Tiffany and Margaux (voiced by Alexandra Collins and Shannon Chan-Kent, respectively) are Cassandra's human best friends.

== Production ==
On October 7, 2002, DIC announced the series' production, which they revealed that the popularity of the live-action sitcom led the company to produce a new Sabrina cartoon to follow up on Sabrina: The Animated Series. DIC also confirmed that Sabrina's Secret Life would be shown off at MIPCOM 2002 for a fall 2003 release.

== Episodes ==
No. overall	No. in season	Title	Written by	Original release date
2	1	"At the Hop"	Hans Lukas	November 10, 2003
Both Sabrina and Cassandra want to ask Harvey to the school dance, but Maritza asks instead for Sabrina. The latter and Cassandra then make a potion as revenge for Maritza to be used on the night of the dance.
3	2	"School Spirit"	Carter Crocker	November 11, 2003
Sabrina is determined to become "the best" by beating Cassandra in the school fundraiser by selling the most cookie dough and monster mix boxes. But Cassandra messes with Sabrina's cookie dough and monster mix, causing all the mortals in Sabrina's neighborhood to turn into monsters.
5	3	"I'm a Slave For Who?"	Jean Loper	November 17, 2003
Sabrina puts a spell on Harvey so that he would devote all of his time to her. When Sabrina finds it annoying that Harvey follows her around everywhere, she tries to reverse the spell, only to find out that it makes Harvey egotistical.
6	4	"Putting Off"	Phil Harnage	November 18, 2003
Sabrina leaves her class report on Attila the Hun to the last minute and struggles to find information on him. She then conjures him up from the past where he fights with Genghis Khan, the person who Cassandra conjured up for her report.
16	5	"Just a Rumor"	Carter Crocker	November 24, 2003
Cassandra starts spreading rumors about Harvey (that he cheated on his math test) and Sabrina (that she dyed her hair blonde) around the school. Sabrina tries to track down the source of the rumors and eventually pays a visit to the "Rumor Mill" in the Netherworld, where all of the Rumors have been set free and escaped to Greendale.
12	6	"Green-Eyed Monster"	William Martin	November 25, 2003
Cassandra fakes an arm injury so that Harvey would spend more time with her. It works and Cassandra makes Sabrina jealous of all the attention she is receiving from Harvey. Sabrina then ruins her potion in class and accidentally conjures a green worm that makes everybody jealous of each other.
13	7	"Lather, Rinse, Repent"	Hans Lukas	December 1, 2003
Sabrina uses a magic hair lotion that makes her hair smooth, silky and curly. All the boys in school start to admire her for her hair. This makes Sabrina take advantage of her new popularity. Cassandra then takes the lotion bottle and gives some to the whole school, who turn into werewolves after using it.
15	8	"J'achoo"	Martha Claire	December 2, 2003
Sabrina gets the highly contagious "Gargoyle Flu" and refuses to take Salem and her aunts' advice to stay in bed until she is fully cured. But Sabrina ignores that and uses a sleeping potion on Salem to go to a Netherworld party.
1	9	"Living Her Dreams"	Michel Troulliet	December 8, 2003
Sabrina delays upgrading her broomstick for Witch School to go to "Dreamland" (in the Netherworld) instead. She uses up her credits to see herself as an Egyptian princess ordering around Margaux, Tiffany and Cassandra (her slaves/worshippers) in a palace. But Cassandra is then almost killed, and it is up to Sabrina to save her.
4	10	"Teacher's Pet"	Michel Troulliet	December 9, 2003
Salem becomes Sabrina and Cassandra's History of Witches teacher. Sabrina takes advantage of her class and fails to study. This leads her to get an 'F' in her pop quiz. After trying to retrieve Salem (who resigned from his post), Sabrina learns that it was important to study and that she should have paid attention in her class.
17	11	"Pet Peeve"	Jean Chalopin	December 15, 2003
Cassandra ruins Sabrina's spell in Witch School, but she has another chance to recast it. With the spell comes a 'hamster' who is wanted by the Netherworld Detectives working with the Police. Sabrina keeps the hamster and names him Spunky. Salem, on a number of occasions, gets framed by Spunky for doing bad things. The "hamster" is in fact a disguise of a warthog, whose real name is Carnivorous. He broke out of Netherworld prison and is after Sabrina to drain her of her innate magical powers, which also weakens her physically. This will then cause her to fall into an enchanted sleep.
11	12	"Half There"	William Martin	December 16, 2003
Both Sabrina and Cassandra want to try out for the part of Ophelia in the school play "Hamlet," since Harvey is going to play the lead character. Sabrina's audition turns into a disaster when Cassandra ruins her performance by using an invisibility potion to trick her. Soon they both try to get even with each other, but it turns out wrong when the potion gets out of control and they constantly fade unaware. Salem tells them to go to the "Middle of Nowhere" in the Netherworld to find an antidote.
7	13	"Matchmaker Sabrina"	Michel Troulliet	December 22, 2003
After Sabrina gets slightly jealous that Cassandra got to read Juliet's lines to Harvey who was playing Romeo in class, she tries to make Mr. Snipe fall in love with Miss. Magrooney using a spell she found. It works and she soon has to find an antidote to the spell in the "Grey Area" in the Netherworld after the spell goes out of control.
8	14	"Sabrina, Part Two"	Jean Chalopin	December 23, 2003
After Sabrina gets in trouble with her aunts for using much stronger and more advanced magic duplication, she and Cassandra conjure up Doppelgängers of themselves so that they can attend Witch School and go to Harvey's party at the same time. But the duplication spell goes wrong when the Doppelgangers switch personalities and Sabrina's doppelgänger ruins Harvey's party, plotting to become the real Sabrina.
9	15	"Spell-ing Bee"	Jean Loper	December 29, 2003
When Sabrina and Cassandra are asked to take part in the "Netherworld Spelling Bee" together, they practice on their own. Sabrina decides to use the spell that her aunts used when they were in the Spelling Bee. When Sabrina rehearses the spell in front of her aunts, they become joined by the heads and have no choice but to go to the Spelling Bee like that, but with a cloak covering one head.
18	16	"Best of Show"	Jean Chalopin	December 30, 2003
When Cassandra gets an A+ on her story and Sabrina an A− on hers, she is furious and determined to beat Cassandra at something. They both attend the local dog show but resort to cheating instead of playing fair by transforming their own pets into dogs.
14	17	"Food 'Tude"	Jean Chalopin	January 5, 2004
When Salem uses a spell on Sabrina's clothes to get them quickly washed and dried (after he slept on them), it accidentally shrinks her jeans. She notices that they suddenly become tight for her and starts exercising and starving herself. This causes her to lose concentration in class, and she ends up with cafeteria detention.
10	18	"Baby Makes Three"	Jean Chalopin	January 6, 2004
Whilst Hilda and Zelda are off to the "Netherworld Beauty Spa," Sabrina hosts a secret party at her house. But a babysitter by the name of Mrs. Pratt comes to babysit Sabrina and she tries to make Mrs. Pratt be closer to her age. However, the spell backfires and turns Mrs. Pratt into a baby after Sabrina assumes that she's older than she thought.
20	19	"Hot Item"	Jean Chalopin	January 12, 2004
Sabrina and Cassandra go on a field trip to the Netherworld with Miss. Magrooney to learn about the history of magical creatures. In the meanwhile, they end up finding an egg, which hatches into a dragon, which Sabrina names Baby D. However, it's fascination for shiny things proves to be an issue when Cassandra blames Maritza for taking the expensive necklace she recently purchased. It's now up to Sabrina to send Baby D back home to his mother, but the issue goes towards the dragon actually seeing where it is going.
21	20	"What's In a Name?"	Jean Chalopin	January 13, 2004
Sabrina and Cassandra are on a mission to find the rarest herb known to witches: "Salviar Mascaria"; after Sabrina accidentally spills all of it in her potion and that causes it to explode, drowning her, Cassandra and Mr. Snipe in the remainders of the potion. However, the two witches soon prove to find out that calling each other names isn't the nicest thing to do when they meet a Cyclops who has an entire field filled with "Salviar Mascaria."
22	21	"Greendale Idol"	Jean Chalopin	January 19, 2004
Sabrina and Maritza are excited when they find out that "Teen Talent Quest" is holding a talent competition in Greendale. Sabrina and Maritza both enter the competition, hoping to beat Cassandra who held a winner's bet: the winner gets to ask Harvey to the "backward dance". However, bribes and magic soon prove to be the competitive nature.
26	22	"Time Flies"	Jean Chalopin	January 20, 2004
Sabrina promises to go to the "Plain Brain" concert with Maritza, which is at the same time Sabrina promised to go to the "Netherworld Hyper Spa" with her aunts. When she cancels out on the concert and wishes she could go to both the concert and the spa, a green worm (by the name of Wiggles) pops out of the crystal ball her aunts gave to her. He presents her with a magic gold dial and a manual that allows her to travel back in time whenever she wants. However, Sabrina fails to read the manual and everything backfires on her.
19	23	"Here's Looking At You"	Jean Chalopin	January 26, 2004
Sabrina forgets to help Maritza with her science project after oversleeping and cancel their friendship. Meanwhile at the magic school, Sabrina and Cassandra discover a magic mirror with a rude personality that sends them to an alternate world where everyone at Greendale High School are witches, except for Sabrina and Cassandra.
24	24	"Cat Man Do"	Jean Chalopin	January 27, 2004
The evil Toc-Toc gets released for revenge on Salem, so Sabrina turns him into a student to hide away. However, when they accuse a new student, Rex, to be Toc-Toc, they all get sent into the Netherworld and meet the real Toc-Toc, who thinks Rex is the real Salem.
25	25	"Witchycology"	Jean Chalopin	February 2, 2004
Sabrina and Maritza invite a professional skateboarder named Ricky Speed for a charity event that prevents pollution and littering. Meanwhile, Cassandra begins to litter and begins to hangs out with Olivia and Hay McGoblin, who are really creatures whose aims are to pollute the town and turn all witches into statues in order for the former to take over the Netherworld.
23	26	"Midsummer's Nightmare"	Jean Chalopin	February 3, 2004
After Sabrina and Cassandra sabotage each other to get the role of Titania in an adaptation of A Midsummer Night's Dream in order to be with Harvey, playing Oberon, Sabrina is made the director of the play and uses her role to stop Cassandra from being close to Harvey. When Puck turns up, he does the same thing with Cassandra in an attempt to steal Harvey's role.

== Broadcast ==
The series was first pre-sold internationally at Mipcom 2002. In November 2002, DIC announced pre-sale rights were sold to Super RTL in Germany, Televisa in Latin America, Fox Kids in Italy, Noga Communications in Israel and Saran in Turkey.

In 2004, Disney Channels Worldwide purchased the pay rights to the series in United Kingdom, Asia, Taiwan, Australia, France, Latin America, Brazil, the Middle East, and Spain as part of a package with Sabrina: The Animated Series titled "Totally Sabrina", which would air on Disney Channel and Toon Disney networks. The package was also pre-sold to TF1 in France, RTÉ in Ireland, Mediaset in Italy, ORF in Austria, Alter Channel in Greece, FORTA in Spain, and SBT in Brazil, alongside addition to broadcasters who already purchased Secret Life, like Super RTL, Noga Communications and Saran.

In the United States, the show aired on DIC's Syndicated programming block DIC Kids Network. The show also reran on Toon Disney for a short time from September 11, 2004 to February 27, 2005 and on CBS as part of the network's Cookie Jar TV block from September 18, 2010, to January 29, 2011, when it was replaced by Trollz and Horseland; however, all DIC references in these later CBS broadcasts have been replaced by Cookie Jar references.

In Canada, the animation network, Teletoon began airing the show on their network for a short time from January 5 to June 4, 2004, replacing the first animated series. However, reruns of the first series would return on September 6 the same year.

The show would later premiere in France on TF1 on October 25, 2004.

In Germany, the show broadcast as simply a third season of Sabrina, the Animated Series, both under the title Simsalabim Sabrina.

== Merchandise ==
=== Home media ===
In Early 2005, Australian distribution company MRA Entertainment released the series in a six-volume DVD collection. Each DVD contained three episodes of the series. A two-volume DVD box set was also released.

DVD	Episodes	Distributor
Volume 1	Living Her Dreams; At The Hop; School Spirit	MRA Entertainment
Volume 2	Teacher's Pet; I'm a Slave for Who? Putting Off	MRA Entertainment
Volume 3	Matchmaker Sabrina; Sabrina, Part Two; Spelling Bee	MRA Entertainment
Volume 4	Baby Makes Three; Half There; Green-Eyed Monster	MRA Entertainment
Volume 5	Lather, Rinse, Repent; Food 'Tude; J'Choo	MRA Entertainment
Volume 6	Just a Rumor; Pet Peeve; Best of Show	MRA Entertainment

=== Burger King Europe promotion ===
In 2005, Burger King released a collectible toy lineup to promote the series, along with Duel Masters in the UK and select European markets. The toys included: a mini-Salem plush, a Sabrina Doll with lifelike hair and a mini comb, and a pair of sunglasses.

== See also ==
- Sabrina: The Animated Series
- Sabrina: Friends Forever
- Sabrina: Secrets of a Teenage Witch
