= Sabrina the Teenage Witch (1996 TV series) =

American fantasy sitcom (1996–2003)

- Genre: Fantasy sitcom; Supernatural
- Created by: Nell Scovell
- Based on: Sabrina the Teenage Witch by: Dan DeCarlo; George Gladir
- Developed by: Jonathan Schmock
- Starring: Melissa Joan Hart; Caroline Rhea; Beth Broderick; Nick Bakay; Nate Richert; Jenna Leigh Green; Michelle Beaudoin; Paul Feig; Lindsay Sloane; Alimi Ballard; Martin Mull; China Shavers; David Lascher; Jon Huertas; Trevor Lissauer; Elisa Donovan; Soleil Moon Frye; Dylan Neal; Andrew Walker; Diana-Maria Riva
- Music by: Danny Lux
- Country of origin: United States
- Original language: English
- No. of seasons: 7
- No. of episodes: 163 (+ 3 television films) (list of episodes)

Production
- Executive producers: Paula Hart; Nell Scovell (1996–1997); Miriam Trogdon (1997–2000); Carrie Honigblum & Renee Phillips (1999–2000); Bruce Ferber (2000–2002); David Babcock (2002–2003); Melissa Joan Hart (1997–2003)
- Running time: 22 minutes
- Production companies: Archie Comics; Hartbreak Films; Finishing the Hat Productions (season 1); Viacom Productions

Original release
- Network: ABC
- Release: September 27, 1996 – May 5, 2000
- Network: The WB
- Release: September 22, 2000 – April 24, 2003

Related
- Chilling Adventures of Sabrina; Acemi Cadı

Sabrina the Teenage Witch is an American fantasy sitcom series based on the Archie Comics character Sabrina Spellman which shares the title of the 1971 comic book series Sabrina the Teenage Witch. Created by Nell Scovell and developed by Jonathan Schmock, the series premiered on September 27, 1996, on ABC to over 17 million viewers in its "TGIF" lineup.

The show stars Melissa Joan Hart as Sabrina, who, on her 16th birthday, learns she has magical powers (a departure from the Archie Comics series, in which she has known of her powers since an early age). She lives with her 600-year-old aunts, witches Hilda (played by Caroline Rhea) and Zelda (played by Beth Broderick), and their magical talking cat Salem (voiced by Nick Bakay), at 133 Collins Road in the fictional town of Westbridge, Massachusetts in the Greater Boston area.

The series aired on ABC for its first four seasons, with the final episode on ABC on May 5, 2000. The final three seasons ran on The WB from September 22, 2000, to April 24, 2003.

== Premise ==
Sabrina the Teenage Witch chronicles the adventures of Sabrina Spellman (Melissa Joan Hart), a girl who discovers on her 16th birthday that she is a witch. As a novice witch, her spells often go awry. Her witch aunts Hilda and Zelda Spellman (Caroline Rhea and Beth Broderick, respectively (Note: Both were regular cast members for the first 6 seasons but departed before season 7 started. Rhea returned for a guest appearance in the series finale.)) counsel her on the proper use of her magic and give her moral advice. Sabrina lives with Hilda and Zelda until she leaves for college at the beginning of season 5. Additionally, Hilda and Zelda must take care of Salem Saberhagen (Nick Bakay), a witch turned into a cat for trying to take over the world.

The show includes contemporary pop-cultural references, as well as fictional history (often presented as secrets hidden from mortals by witches) and science-fiction elements. Storylines are often episodic, but some seasons feature ongoing arcs, such as Sabrina's quest to uncover the Spellman family secret in season 3. Sabrina's basic premise and "genial loopiness" earned the show comparisons to the 1960s television series Bewitched. The show spanned seven years over seven seasons, though each season was not a year. (Note: Season 1 and 2 cover exactly a year each, with Sabrina being 16 and 17, respectively. In Season 3, her age is not revealed, but in the Season 4 opening episode she turns 18, implying Season 3 also covers her being 17 as well. Season 4 covers her 18th birthday and that year. Season 5 starts a summer later, with Sabrina being 19 – she spends three years at college in journalism, which is covered in Seasons 5 and 6. She has graduated by the beginning of Season 7 (as she's living in the Spellman House with Roxie and Morgan and working), meaning she is aged up to 22 over two seasons covering three in-universe years. In the final season, Sabrina is 23.)

== Cast and characters ==
Libby, Sabrina, Harvey, and Valerie

- Melissa Joan Hart as Sabrina Spellman, a teenager who discovers on her sixteenth birthday that she is a witch and comes from a long line of witches. As she struggles to master her magic, she often wreaks havoc on those around her. Sabrina moved into her college's dormitories at the beginning of the fifth season and then back into her aunts' house in the seventh season after they left for the Other Realm.
- Caroline Rhea as Hilda Spellman (seasons 1–6), one of the Spellman sisters and Sabrina's aunt. Hilda is the less rational and the more impulsive one. After giving up violin in the fourth season (she destroyed her violin with dynamite), Hilda purchased a clock shop. Later, after Sabrina moved out of the house, she purchased Bean There, Brewed That, the coffee shop where Sabrina worked, and renamed it Hilda's Coffee House. After her marriage at the end of the sixth season, she moved away with her husband. Hilda returned for the series finale. Her middle name, 'Sucker', is revealed in season 6, although her middle name was Antoinette in season 2. In the second episode of season 4, Hilda states that she is 620 years old. However, in episode 12 of season 5 Sabrina mentions she's about to celebrate her 650th birthday.
- Beth Broderick as Zelda Spellman (seasons 1–6), Sabrina's aunt and Hilda's older sister. Zelda, a scientist and college professor, is the more rational of the two Spellman sisters and is often the voice of reason when Hilda or Sabrina uses magic irresponsibly. At the end of the sixth season, she gives up her maturity in order for Sabrina to be changed back to flesh and blood after being turned into stone when she lost her true loves. At the beginning of season 7, Sabrina advises a now-child Zelda to leave for the other realm with a newly married Hilda, ensuring her that she is okay to live on her own. Zelda makes an appearance as a candle in the last episode to allow Sabrina's mother to attend Sabrina's wedding. In episode 6 of season 6, Hilda states that Zelda is 658 years old.
- Nick Bakay as the voice of Salem Saberhagen, a 500-year-old warlock who was sentenced to live 100 years as a talking, black American Shorthair cat for plotting to take over the world. Besides Sabrina herself, he is the only character to remain for all seven seasons, appearing in every episode alongside her.
- Nate Richert as Harvey Kinkle, Sabrina's boyfriend in the first four seasons. He breaks up with her between seasons 4 and 5, when he finds out she is a witch. He later dates Morgan, Sabrina's college roommate, before he and Sabrina reconnect romantically in the series finale.
- Jenna Leigh Green as Libby Chessler (seasons 1–3), Sabrina's arch-enemy while at high school. Libby is a spoiled rich girl and is often at the other end of Sabrina's spells as she learns to use them, leading Libby to often call Sabrina a "Freak" or "Freakster". Libby, a cheerleader, is seen to fancy Sabrina's love interest, Harvey, and makes many attempts to ask him out. Libby was sent to boarding school following the end of season 3.
- Michelle Beaudoin as Jenny Kelley (season 1), Sabrina's best friend in the first season. Jenny befriends Sabrina on her first day, and also introduces Sabrina to Harvey. Jenny is a self-described outsider who sees much pretense in the way life works at Westbridge High School. Jenny is absent from the second season onward, and is never mentioned again.
- Paul Feig as Mr. Eugene Pool (season 1), who teaches biology to Sabrina and her classmates. He is sometimes bitter and sarcastic, but always involved and usually lively. Mr. Pool is not mentioned after season 1.
- Lindsay Sloane as Valerie Birkhead (seasons 2–3), Sabrina's best friend in those two seasons. Valerie initially comes across as anxious, but her self-esteem improves over the course of her time on the show. Valerie discovers that Sabrina is a witch after Sabrina is allowed to tell her and Harvey; they're both supportive before they have their memories magically reset. Valerie left to move to Alaska with her parents at the start of season 4.
- Martin Mull as Willard Kraft (seasons 2–4), the vice principal, and later principal, of Westbridge High, Sabrina's high school. Mr. Kraft is overbearing and petty, and he shares Libby's personal disdain for Sabrina. Complicating things, he is also the on/off boyfriend of both Hilda and Zelda. Mr. Kraft left the series after Sabrina graduated from high school at the end of season 4.
- Alimi Ballard as Quizmaster (season 2), real name Albert, Sabrina's magic tutor. His role is to teach her how to use her magic properly and acquire her witch's license. As Sabrina gained her license in the first episode of season 3, the character's last appearance was in the last episode of season 2.
- David Lascher as Josh Blackhart (seasons 4–6), Sabrina's college-age supervisor in the coffee shop and, later, her love interest. Josh struggles with his career throughout his first two seasons, eventually deciding he wants to be a photographer. He abruptly leaves to take a job in Prague after Sabrina gives up her love life to save Hilda's life at the end of season 6.
- Jon Huertas as Brad Alcerro (season 4), the new kid in school, but used to attend Westbridge High, before Sabrina went to that school. Brad has a "witch hunter gene", but doesn't know it. This makes him instinctively distrustful of, and dangerous to, both Sabrina and Dreama. Sabrina tries to stay away from him, but every time she is in school and uses magic, Brad always sees it. In the episode "Dreama, the Mouse", Dreama makes a water fountain appear, Brad sees and says "You know, sometimes I think you're a real witch" and then Dreama turns into a mouse. In that same episode Brad loses his witch hunter gene through an operation. He doesn't return after Sabrina starts college in season 5.
- China Shavers as Dreama (season 4), another new kid in school. Dreama is a witch who causes a lot of trouble because she uses magic. Sabrina is later assigned to be her mentor and has to teach Dreama how to control her magic. She is not mentioned after season 4, and it is never stated if she passed her test to get her witch's license.
- Soleil Moon Frye as Roxie King (seasons 5–7), Sabrina's mortal roommate during her college years and remains a very close friend to her after their graduation. An activist with a very cynical humor, her opinion often clashes with Sabrina's more upbeat attitude towards life. Later, both seem to have an effect on each other, as Roxie grows to be much more honest and compassionate, while Sabrina matures and becomes more socially conscious.
- Elisa Donovan as Morgan Cavanaugh (seasons 5–7), Sabrina's third and final housemate, as well as her tutor, during her college years. Morgan is a talented fashion designer and a very good friend, but can also be shallow and even mischievous at times. She's the only known character who dated both of Sabrina's long term romantic interests (Harvey and Josh) as well as expressed interest in her fiancé, Aaron.
- Trevor Lissauer as Miles Goodman (seasons 5–6), Sabrina's housemate during her college years though, unlike Roxie and Morgan, he's never seen nor mentioned after the graduation. Miles is a goodhearted, but nerdy boy obsessed with all things supernatural. Miles often comes close to discovering Sabrina's secret. Throughout the series, he develops a crush on Zelda, and is hinted to harbor similar feelings for Sabrina and Roxie.
- Dylan Neal as Aaron Jacobs (season 7)
- Andrew Walker as Cole Harper (season 7)
- Diana-Maria Riva as Annie Martoz (season 7)

== History and production ==
The unofficial pilot of the series was the April 1996 television movie Sabrina the Teenage Witch. The movie, produced by Viacom and Hartbreak Films and aired on Showtime, stars Melissa Joan Hart as the title character, Sabrina Sawyer, with Charlene Fernetz and Sherry Miller respectively as Sabrina's aunts Zelda and Hilda, and Michelle Beaudoin as Sabrina's best friend Marnie. When the television series debuted on ABC later that year, Hart's Sabrina Sawyer became Sabrina Spellman, Beth Broderick and Caroline Rhea replaced Fernetz and Miller as Zelda and Hilda Spellman, and Beaudion's Marnie became Jenny. In 2000, the show was dropped by ABC and picked up by The WB. When viewership began to wane, the show was canceled after seven seasons.

Music for the series includes the opening theme, initially an instrumental composed by Danny Lux, later composed by Lux with Paul Taylor and adding vocals by Thomas Leonard, and additional scoring/arranging by Gary Stockdale.

The television series was produced by Hartbreak Films and Viacom Productions, with Finishing the Hat Productions involved for the first season only.

=== Opening sequence ===
For the first three seasons, the opening theme was an instrumental, pop track composed by Danny Lux. The music was accompanied by Sabrina in front of a mirror posing with four different costumes and outfits as the cast members' names quickly flash on the bottom of the screen. The first three outfits are always the same, but the fourth one changes from episode to episode. At the end, Sabrina would say something related to the last costume (often a pun or a joke related to the costume or the content of the episode), and then magically disappear from head on down.

The opening sequence was changed for the fourth season, featuring a completely new theme and the show's main characters, starting with Sabrina, floating in bubbles while their names are displayed in gold letters and a voice chants "Secret" in the background.

The opening credits for the final three seasons are accompanied by a new vocal theme song, which Paul Taylor joined Danny Lux to compose, with new vocals from Thomas Leonard. It features Sabrina at various locations around Boston: Harvard Bridge, Boston Common, Union Oyster House, Massachusetts State House, Quincy Market, Newbury Street, Harvard University, Tufts University and Beacon Hill. In the credits for Seasons 5 and 6, after leaving Newbury Comics on Newbury Street, Sabrina walks down a flight of stairs and computer graphics morph Sabrina into her room, lying on her bed next to Salem. In the seventh and final season, the computer graphics morph Sabrina arriving at Scorch. Upon pushing the door open, she is revealed to be walking into her house to greet Roxie, Morgan and Salem.

The house pictured as the Spellman residence is a Victorian mansion located at 64 E. Main St. in Freehold, New Jersey. The exteriors for Westbridge High School are those of Dwight Morrow High School in Englewood, New Jersey.

=== Departures ===
The show went through many cast changes, the first of which involved the unexplained departure of Sabrina's best friend Jenny Kelly (Michelle Beaudoin) and her teacher Mr. Pool (Paul Feig) at the end of the first season.

At the beginning of the fourth season, Valerie permanently departs the show along with Libby. Valerie's character moves away to Alaska with her family, while Libby transfers to a boarding school.

After the fourth season, several secondary actors left the show, including Martin Mull and Nate Richert, who played Sabrina's boyfriend Harvey since the first season. Harvey's character was dropped in order to give the show a different look as Sabrina was about to attend college. The decision was later rescinded, and Richert appeared in three episodes of Season 5 and then returned as a series regular in Seasons 6 and 7.

After the sixth season, Caroline Rhea and Beth Broderick, who had portrayed Sabrina's aunts since the show's premiere, decided to leave the show. When the character of Sabrina started to attend college, the role of her aunts became less important. Broderick felt that the role of Zelda had nothing more to offer, while Rhea landed her own syndicated talk show, The Caroline Rhea Show. The aunts left for The Other Realm; Rhea appeared in the series finale but Broderick was absent.

Trevor Lissauer, who played Sabrina's housemate Miles, left the show after appearing in Seasons 5 and 6. Producers felt that his character was not well received by fans and also had to make some budget cuts for the show's seventh and final season. Miles was never properly written out, leaving his fate undetermined.

Sabrina's love interest Josh, played by David Lascher, left for Prague after appearing from Seasons 4 through 6; Lascher reportedly wanted to pursue other projects. To fill the void, the producers brought in Aaron, played by Dylan Neal, as Sabrina's love interest in the show's final season.

== Broadcast and release ==
In 2000, The WB network picked up the series after ABC canceled it.

=== American syndication ===
The show was syndicated by Paramount Domestic Television for reruns on local stations, including Tribune-owned WB affiliates.

Reruns have aired on ABC Family, Nickelodeon/Nick at Nite, Noggin (as part of its teen block The N), TeenNick, MTV2, Hub Network, Logo TV, Antenna TV and Fuse. It currently airs on Antenna TV and Rewind TV, and is available to stream on Pluto TV, Tubi, Hulu, and Paramount+.

=== International syndication ===
In the United Kingdom, Sabrina previously aired on ITV and Nickelodeon. It later began airing on Pop Girl, a free-to-air children's channel, in July 2012, which previously broadcast the first two seasons and the two subsequent movies before shutting down in October 2015. The series was slightly edited for content on UK children's channels. It has aired on 4Music since 2019, and previously on The Vault since 2014 until its subsequent rebrand as Trace Vault. In October 2021, the entire series became available to stream on Amazon Prime Video, but was removed at the end of September 2022. In late 2026, it began airing on Comedy Central (UK & Ireland), and became available to stream on Now (streaming service), becoming a mainstay in the platform's top ten most watched series.

The show aired in the Republic of Ireland on RTÉ2 weekdays at 5:10 p.m. as part of the youth-oriented show TRTÉ until late 2012.

In France, the show aired on France 2 in 1997 under the name Sabrina, l'apprentie sorcière (Sabrina the Apprentice Witch).

In Germany, the show aired on Comedy & Co. under the name Sabrina - Total Verhext! (Sabrina -Totally Bewitched!) in 1997.

In Italy, the show aired on Italia 1 under the name Sabrina, vita da strega (Sabrina, life as a witch) from September 3, 1998 until May 28, 2004.

In Australia, the show aired on Eleven, the free-to-air channel owned by Network Ten (upon which repeats of Sabrina had previously aired) at 6:00 p.m. and until December 6, 2013, with repeats at 12:30 a.m., seven days a week. It originally aired in Australia on the Seven Network during its first run.

In Canada, the show is available on Paramount+ (formerly CBS All Access) since the 2021 international launch and rebranding of the service. It also aired on Family Channel (in Canada) up until the Channels closure in October 2025

In Russia, the first show of the series took place on the TV channel "Russia" on November 8, 2003, where it was originally broadcast until January 31, 2004, under the name "Academy of Witchcraft" and the first season was shown. Later, all seven seasons were shown in the period 2004–2006 on the STS channel (premiered on March 9, 2004).

=== Home media ===
In 2007, CBS Home Entertainment (through Paramount Home Entertainment) released seasons 1–3 on DVD. CBS later released seasons 4–7 on DVD. The official copyright holder for the series (as with all series originally produced by Viacom Productions) is CBS Studios Productions, LLC. For this home video release, music has been changed and many episodes are edited. Some musical performances were cut due to music licensing.

On July 27, 2010, Sabrina, the Teenage Witch: The Complete Series Pack—which included an individual DVD set for each of the seven seasons, totaling 24 discs—was released from the United States by Paramount for Region 1. On February 16, 2016, Sabrina, the Teenage Witch: The Complete Series 24-disc DVD set was released from the United States by Paramount Pictures for Region 1, as well. On August 15 of the same year, Sabrina, the Teenage Witch: The Complete Enchanted Series 24-disc DVD box set was released from the United Kingdom by Universal Pictures for Region 2. Then on January 27, 2021, a repackaged and slightly more compact edition of the Sabrina, the Teenage Witch: The Complete Series Region 1 DVD set (still with 24 discs) was released from the United States by Paramount Home Entertainment.

On June 21, 2023, Sabrina, the Teenage Witch: The Complete Collection 25-disc DVD set was released from Australia by Via Vision for Region 0, including all seven seasons of the show plus the television movies Sabrina Goes to Rome and Sabrina Down Under.

== Episodes and U.S. ratings history ==
| Season | Episodes | Originally released | | | Rank | Viewers (millions) |
| Season | Episodes | First released | Last released | Network | Rank | Viewers (millions) |
|---|---|---|---|---|---|---|
| 1 | 24 | September 27, 1996 | May 16, 1997 | ABC | 41 | 9.3 |
| 2 | 26 | September 26, 1997 | May 15, 1998 | ABC | 41 | 12.5 |
| 3 | 25 | September 25, 1998 | May 21, 1999 | ABC | 41 | 12.2 |
| 4 | 22 | September 24, 1999 | May 5, 2000 | ABC | 57 | 10.2 |
| 5 | 22 | September 22, 2000 | May 18, 2001 | The WB | 124 | 3.8 |
| 6 | 22 | October 5, 2001 | May 10, 2002 | The WB | 140 | 3.1 |
| 7 | 22 | September 20, 2002 | April 24, 2003 | The WB | 146 | 3.0 |
| Films | | April 7, 1996 | September 26, 1999 | Showtime; ABC | —N/a | —N/a |

During its four-year run on ABC, Sabrina was the highest-rated series among the network's TGIF line-up. In the 2000–2001 season, the show moved to The WB after a negotiation dispute with ABC. While ABC was willing to renew the show for a fifth season, the network was not willing to commit to further seasons beyond season five. Viacom Productions, which produced the show, wanted an increased fee (up from $1 million per episode); ABC offered $1.2 million per episode. The WB then picked up the show for $650,000 per episode, but committed to two seasons, provided the show met ratings goals. For the show's seventh and final season, The WB initially only ordered 13 episodes in spring 2002 before committing to a full 22-episode season that November.

== In other media ==
The series spawned a 1998 soundtrack and the release of several multiplatform video games beginning in 1999. A book series based on episodes from the show was produced as well as the biweekly magazine Sabrina's Secrets.

=== Soundtrack ===
On October 27, 1998, Geffen Records released a soundtrack for the series. The album features songs by contemporary pop artists such as Spice Girls, Backstreet Boys, and Britney Spears. It also features Melissa Joan Hart's cover of "One Way or Another" from the Season 2 episode "The Band Episode". The album was certified Gold by the RIAA in the United States, double Platinum in Canada, and has sold over 700,000 copies worldwide.

=== Video games ===
On June 11, 1999, Knowledge Adventure through Simon & Schuster Interactive and Havas Interactive officially announced the video games Sabrina the Teenage Witch: Spellbound, Sabrina the Teenage Witch: Brat Attack and Sabrina the Teenage Witch: Bundle of Magic for Macintosh and Microsoft Windows operating systems.

On March 29, 2001, Knowledge Adventure through Simon & Schuster Interactive and Havas Interactive officially announced the video game Sabrina the Teenage Witch: A Twitch in Time! for the PlayStation game system.

| Game title | Platform | Developer | Publisher | Release date |
|---|---|---|---|---|
| Sabrina the Teenage Witch: Spellbound | Macintosh, Microsoft Windows | Havas Interactive | Knowledge Adventure (Havas Interactive), Simon & Schuster Interactive | August 27, 1999 |
| Sabrina the Teenage Witch: Bundle of Magic | Microsoft Windows, Macintosh | Havas Interactive | Knowledge Adventure (Havas Interactive), Simon & Schuster Interactive | August 27, 1999 |
| Sabrina the Teenage Witch: Brat Attack | Macintosh, Microsoft Windows | Havas Interactive | Knowledge Adventure (Havas Interactive), Simon & Schuster Interactive | November 8, 1999 |
| Sabrina the Teenage Witch: A Twitch in Time! | PlayStation | Havas Interactive | Knowledge Adventure (Havas Interactive), Simon & Schuster Interactive | March 30, 2001 |
| Sabrina the Teenage Witch: Potion Commotion | Game Boy Advance | Ubisoft | Ubisoft | April 25, 2002, September 1, 2002 |
| Sabrina the Teenage Witch Triple Pack | Microsoft Windows, Hybrid PC, Macintosh | Simon & Schuster Interactive | Simon & Schuster Interactive | February 27, 2004 |

== Animated series ==
An animated spin-off of the show, Sabrina: The Animated Series, started airing during the live action show's 4th season. The role of Sabrina was voiced by Hart's younger sister Emily Hart. Melissa Joan Hart voiced both aunts, Hilda and Zelda, and Nick Bakay reprises his role of Salem. This series was followed by a television film, Sabrina: Friends Forever, which in turn was followed by another series titled Sabrina's Secret Life. Neither Emily Hart nor Melissa Joan Hart returned for the television film or the follow-up series. An animated spin-off focusing on Salem the Cat was also slated to debut in the 2001–02 season before it was scrapped.

A new animated spin-off was produced by Hub Network in 2013 called Sabrina: Secrets of a Teenage Witch. In this version, Sabrina (voiced by Ashley Tisdale) is a witch princess in training so that she can one day rule the other realm.
