= Salem Saberhagen =

Fictional character from Sabrina the Teenage Witch

- Sabrina the Teenage Witch character
- Salem in Archie #636 (August 2012). Art by Gisele "Gil" (pencils), Rich "Richele" Koslowski (inks)
- First appearance: Archie's Mad House #22 (October 1962)
- Created by: Dan DeCarlo; George Gladir
- Voiced by: Dallas McKennon (Filmation series); Brian Steele (TV film; uncredited); Nick Bakay (Sitcom series, Sabrina: The Animated Series); Maurice LaMarche (Sabrina's Secret Life); Ian James Corlett (Sabrina: Secrets of a Teenage Witch); Luke Cook (Chilling Adventures of Sabrina)

In-universe information
- Species: American Shorthair cat (currently); Warlock (formerly)
- Gender: Male
- Family: Comics; None; Sitcom; Morty Saberhagen (uncle); Goliath Saberhagen (uncle); Humphrey Saberhagen (grandfather); Julia Trumfull (grandmother)
- Significant others: Comics; Stephanie Saberhagen Gingrich; Sitcom; Shelley (ex-girlfriend)
- Children: Comics; None; Sitcom; Annabelle Saberhagen (daughter)
- Relatives: Comics; None; Sitcom; Morty Saberhagen (uncle); Goliath Saberhagen (uncle); Gummo Saberhagen (father); Humphrey Saberhagen (grandfather); Julia Trumfull (grandmother); France Trumfull Saberhagen (mother); Cheryl (cousin)
- Nationality: American

Other Information
- Abilities: (As a cat): Occult knowledge; (As a wizard): Magic
- Hair Color: Comics; Black and White; Sitcom; Black
- Eye Color: Comics; Blue; Sitcom; Yellowish/Gold

Salem Saberhagen is a character from the American Archie Comics comic series Sabrina the Teenage Witch. Salem is an American Shorthair cat who lives with Sabrina Spellman, Hilda Spellman and Zelda Spellman in the fictional town of Greendale, located near Riverdale. Formerly a human warlock, Salem was sentenced by the Witches’ Council to spend 100 years as a cat, as punishment for trying to take over the world. Salem first appeared alongside Sabrina in Archie's Mad House #22 in 1962, and was created by George Gladir and Dan DeCarlo.

Earlier comics portray Salem as a normal orange-colored feline who does not speak. With the debut and success of the 1990s live-action Sabrina the Teenage Witch sitcom, Salem's backstory and character underwent several retcons to bring it more in line with the sitcom's version. A late 1990s story initially revealed Salem was turned into a cat for jilting Enchantra, the Head Witch, at the altar. A similar version of events was presented in a 1990s live-action television film, where he was imprisoned in the form of a cat for attempting to use his magic to make a mortal love him. However, the comics eventually gave Salem a similar backstory that was shown in the sitcom and its spinoff, Sabrina: The Animated Series. Further details about Salem's past before his transformation into a cat were revealed in the 2000s manga-inspired version of the comic, written and drawn by Tania del Rio.

In the comic book Chilling Adventures of Sabrina, Salem is given a more serious role to fit with the series' darker tone. In this version, Salem often acts as a conscience to Sabrina, questioning her hot-headed or more daring ideas.

== In other media ==
=== Sabrina the Teenage Witch (sitcom) ===
==== Personality ====
Salem has a rapier wit and is often the first character to come up with the one-liners or obvious puns in a scene. In addition to world domination, his ambitious plotting often includes attempts to become wealthy, achieve celebrity status, regain his magical powers, and return to his human form. He consistently gives bad advice to Sabrina, often involving using magic to solve a problem, which consistently leaves Sabrina with even more problems than before. His favorite pastimes include playing with yarn, lint spotting, surfing the internet, and reading Sabrina's diary. He loves Lizard Flakes, a snack for cats which is said to be fattening and full of cholesterol. In the show's pilot, he made the remark to Sabrina that he misses being able to dance. In some episodes, Salem acts more like a cat than a human, as if he was really one all along.

Despite his arrogance, greed, and sarcasm, he is shown in many episodes to genuinely care about the Spellmans, especially Sabrina. He also has a soft-spot for Harvey, to the point that he once expressed a wish that he would be best man at Harvey and Sabrina's wedding. Harvey learned Salem's true identity sometime around the end of high school, but prior to this Sabrina would occasionally use a "Doctor Dolittle" spell that would allow Harvey to talk with Salem and believe there was nothing unusual about it when circumstances prompted Sabrina and her aunts to go away and Harvey was left in charge of Salem's care.

==== History ====
Salem was a human warlock, sentenced by the Witch's Council to spend 100 years as a cat with no magical powers after being caught in an attempt to take over the world. In the original comic (depending on the story), he retains limited powers via incantations, but requires Sabrina's magic finger to enact them. In the series, he retains no powers and was sentenced as punishment for his attempt to take over the world. In the film, he was cursed to spend a century as a cat because he had used his powers to impress a mortal. At the beginning of the television series, he had already served 25 years. Salem generally serves as some of the show's comic relief, with his quick-witted quips and deadpan delivery. Despite his megalomaniacal desires for world domination, he is genuinely a good person and protective guardian to Sabrina. In the series he would generally serve two roles: one as a mentor / "familiar" - commonly an animal that helps a young witch, for Sabrina, as she found it easier to talk with him about her problems, or the mischievous anti-hero in the episode, such as finding an illegal way to become human again without being punished. He has shown on multiple occasions to be very emotionally attached to Sabrina; in the fourth season, when Sabrina left to live with her father in Paris, Salem missed her so much he started a civil war on Pluto, in order to get her back to Westbridge.

The leaders of his attempted revolution were also turned into house pets. Newt, the pet of Hilda and Zelda's cousin Monty, was heavily involved with the scheme, for the promised reward of Denmark. Another follower, Duke (played by Dick Van Dyke), had a reduced sentence and was set free during the series, though Salem tried to use him to take over the world again. A talking guinea pig named Stonehenge ("Stony" for short) was introduced in the first made-for-television film, but whether or not he was ever human is unknown. Hilda was also one of Salem's followers; her punishment was to keep Salem free of worms during his period as a feline, although she was pardoned at the end of season five. During season one, Salem was visited by his parole officer, to whom he insisted that his transformation is under way, but he accidentally lets it slip that he still yearns for control of the planet. By the end of the series, Salem never did turn back into his human form, and a brief period where he was transferred into the body of one of Sabrina's classmates resulted in an extra fifty years being added to his sentence, even after he confessed to his mistakes when he realized that Sabrina was to be punished for his actions.

==== Family ====
Members of Salem's blood family include his daughter, Annabelle, whom Salem cares deeply for but is estranged from due to his shame about being a cat. Salem managed to make it to her wedding and performed all the duties of father of the bride. Salem is visited by his mother and initially dreads the impending visit as she is highly critical. Upon her learning he is a cat, she cannot help but be delighted by how cute his new form is and pampered him to the point Sabrina missed her own mother and went to visit her. It is revealed later in the episode that Salem's mother was unknowingly allergic to cats. Another member is Salem's grandfather, who is a hobo. According to Salem, Salem's grandmother claims he (Salem's grandfather) was lost at sea. He also mentioned having an uncle Goliath and Morty. In one episode, Salem mentions that his father's name was Gummo, implying that he died.

Salem often uses Yiddish words and mentioned his cousin Cheryl's Bat Mitzvah in "Sabrina in Wonderland".

==== Relatives ====
- Mrs. Saberhagen, Salem's mother. She was strict but well-meaning and did not know that Salem was a cat until she came to visit him. She pampered him and he loved it. But she found out that she was allergic to cats and had to leave early.
- Uncle Morty is Salem's uncle. He is rude and has no manners.
- Gummo is Salem's father. Mentioned.
- Annabelle is Salem's daughter.
- Punit Mistry is Salem's first cousin, twice removed.
- Uncle Goliath, Salem's uncle. Mentioned.
- Grandpa, Salem's grandfather, works the trains.
- Cheryl, Salem's cousin. Mentioned.
- Grandma, Salem's grandmother.

==== Awards and nominations ====
Year	Association	Category	Result
1998	Kids' Choice Awards	Favorite Animal Star	Won
1999	Kids' Choice Awards	Favorite Animal Star	Won
2000	Kids' Choice Awards	Favorite Animal Star	Won

==== The sitcom model ====
Salem in the 1996 Sabrina the Teenage Witch sitcom.

The sitcom's creators were very supportive of animal rights, so Salem is often played by an animatronic model rather than one of the four actual cats who are used for the non-dialogue scenes as well as scenes where Salem's lips are not required to move. The four trained cats portraying the character were named Elvis, Lucy, Salem, and Witch. This part was performed by three puppeteers and two different animatronic puppets. The mechanical Salems were originally made by Animal Makers, but in early 1998 they were fired, and their puppets were replaced with ones made by The Chiodo Brothers. The new mechanical Salem(s) were controlled by 3 puppeteers, who could manipulate Salem's body in more than 30 ways via rod, cables, and radio control. Animal Makers posted a video of some of the puppets highlights on its website.

In a few instances where his human form is shown in flashbacks, he is portrayed with his face in shadows or covered using other means.

In the sitcom and Sabrina: The Animated Series, Salem is voiced by Nick Bakay. In one sitcom episode titled "Jealousy", Salem says he needs to make a phone call to Bakay's ESPN radio show, noting, "All he ever talks about is the Buffalo Bills, and his voice? LORD, is it annoying!"

==== Other appearances ====
The sitcom version of Salem also made a guest appearance on the Disney-ABC owned shows Boy Meets World, You Wish, and Teen Angel on November 7, 1997, and Disney's One Saturday Morning on Friday Night with Valarie Rae Miller on September 11, 1998.

=== Filmation animated series ===
In the Filmation series, Salem (similar to the comics) was portrayed as an ordinary orange-colored cat who could only meow. Salem's meows were provided by Dallas McKennon. In these appearances, Salem possessed limited magical abilities, including the ability to teleport himself. A running gag in this series was Salem's recurring feud with Jughead's dog Hot Dog.

=== DIC animated series ===
Salem was a main character in Sabrina: The Animated Series and its follow-up series Sabrina: Friends Forever and Sabrina's Secret Life. Salem here retains his backstory from the live-action sitcom, including his last name being "Saberhagen", being black colored, and having been a former witch turned into a cat as punishment by the Witch's Council. Unlike the live-action sitcom, but similar to the previous Filmation series, Salem possesses a limited range of magical powers.

Nick Bakay reprised Salem for Sabrina, the Animated Series. Louis Chirillo provided Salem's voice in Sabrina: Friends Forever, while Maurice LaMarche took over for Sabrina's Secret Life. An animated spin-off focusing on him was also slated to debut in the 2001–02 season before it was scrapped for unknown reasons.

=== Sabrina the Teenage Witch (television film) ===
Salem appeared in the Sabrina the Teenage Witch live-action TV movie. He was voiced by Brian Steele in an uncredited role.

=== Sabrina: Secrets of a Teenage Witch ===
Salem appeared in the 2013 series Sabrina: Secrets of a Teenage Witch. Ian James Corlett voices Salem. His voice in this series was an imitation of Paul Lynde. Unlike in previous incarnations, Salem is a spy for Enchantra the head witch, and the Spellman family are unaware of his human form.

=== Chilling Adventures of Sabrina (TV series) ===
Salem appears in the Netflix television series, which is an adaptation of the Chilling Adventures of Sabrina comics. Instead of being a human originally like in previous iterations of the character, Salem is a familiar. This version of the character also doesn't speak though it was hinted that he might in the future by series creator Roberto Aguirre-Sacasa. Although, he currently only communicates via telepathy, represented in the form of a meow or a hiss. He also has very little physical communication with Sabrina due to Kiernan Shipka, the actress who portrays Sabrina, being allergic to cats.

Salem is voiced by Luke Cook, who also plays Lucifer Morningstar, in the Part 4 episode "Chapter Thirty-Five: The Endless", in which Sabrina is transported into a sitcom version of the series.
