= Saberhagen =

Saberhagen is an American surname. Notable people with the surname include:

- Bret Saberhagen (born 1964), American baseball player
- Fred Saberhagen (1930–2007), American writer

== Fictional characters ==
- Salem Saberhagen, character in the comic book series Sabrina the Teenage Witch
