= Chilling Adventures of Sabrina =

2014 American comic book

- Cover of Chilling Adventures of Sabrina #2 (April 2015). Art by Robert Hack

Publication information
- Publisher: Archie Horror
- Schedule: Irregular
- Format: Ongoing series
- Genre: Horror
- Publication date: October 2014 – present
- No. of issues: 9
- Main character: Sabrina the Teenage Witch

Creative team
- Created by: Roberto Aguirre-Sacasa; Robert Hack
- Written by: Roberto Aguirre-Sacasa
- Artist: Robert Hack
- Letterer: Jack Morelli

Chilling Adventures of Sabrina is an American comic book series published by Archie Horror, an imprint of Archie Comics, beginning in 2014. The series is a darker take on the characters and setting of Sabrina the Teenage Witch. It is written by Roberto Aguirre-Sacasa, with art by Robert Hack, and is inspired by the appearances of Sabrina in Aguirre-Sacasa's other Archie series, Afterlife with Archie.

A loose television adaptation of the same name ran for four parts and 36 episodes, from October 26, 2018 to December 31, 2020.

== Publication history ==
Due to the positive reception of Afterlife with Archie #6, which centered on Sabrina, a solo series starring her was announced in June 2014. The first issue was released in October 2014. The series went on a six-month hiatus before returning in April 2015 under the new Archie Horror imprint. Issue #9 was released in October 13th 2021, 4 years after Issue #8.

Though the two series are described as "companion series" and share several characters, they are each set in their own reality and are not directly related to one another. In issue #8, Sabrina experiences a vision of the Afterlife with Archie versions of herself and Jughead Jones, suggesting some connection between the two continuities.

The title is based on a 1972 anthology series, Chilling Adventures in Sorcery As Told By Sabrina, in which Sabrina narrated serious horror tales drawn in the Archie style. That book only lasted two issues, and was rebooted in 1973 by Archie's imprint Red Circle Comics as Chilling Adventures in Sorcery, minus Sabrina and the company's traditional cartooning style.

== Story arcs ==
=== Volume 1: The Crucible (issues 1–5) ===
Half-witch Sabrina lives with her witch aunts, Hilda and Zelda, her warlock cousin Ambrose, and Salem, her feline familiar, in the town of Greendale. Nearing her sixteenth birthday, she must choose whether to become a full witch or pursue a mortal life with her boyfriend, Harvey Kinkle. Meanwhile, Madam Satan, a former flame of Sabrina's estranged father, has returned from Hell and wants revenge on the Spellman family.

=== Volume 2: Witch-War (issues 6–) ===
Sabrina's father, Edward Spellman, is mysteriously back among the living, masquerading as a resurrected Harvey. Hilda and Zelda warn Sabrina about the consequences of necromancy, but Sabrina protects "Harvey" against their attempts to send him back to the grave. Edward begins to wonder who could've helped Sabrina engage in such powerful magic.

== Characters ==
=== Main ===
- Sabrina Diana Fiona Spellman, a teenage half-witch who lives in the town of Greendale with her aunts, her cousin Ambrose, and her familiar Salem. Unbeknownst to Sabrina, when she was just a year old, she was taken from her mother, Diana, by her aunts with the approval of her father, Edward. Sabrina was told that her mother died; she hasn't seen her father since she was young. While Sabrina is taught witchery by her aunts at home, she lives a relatively normal life in public as a cheerleader and student at Baxter High School. No one, including her boyfriend Harvey, is aware that she is a witch.
- Hilda Spellman, Sabrina's witch aunt and co-guardian. She is more forbearing than Zelda, though both are strict followers of witch law and the Church of Night.
- Zelda Spellman, Sabrina's other witch aunt and co-guardian. She is more pragmatic than Hilda, though they both ultimately want the best for their niece, despite keeping the truth about her parents a secret.
- Madam Satan, formerly known as Iola, Edward's witch girlfriend whom he left for Diana. Heartbroken that he chose a mortal over her, Iola killed herself and wound up in the pits of Gehenna, a place reserved in the circle of Hell for suicides, where she remained faceless until she was accidentally released by two amateur witches. After gaining a new face, she burns the tree that encased Edward and cures Diana of the insanity he inflicted upon her, but leaves her unable to leave the psychiatric facility. Upon discovering their daughter's existence, she makes her way to Greendale where she becomes a teacher at Baxter High as "Evangeline Porter" where she can monitor Sabrina and continue her revenge against the Spellman family.
- Ambrose Spellman, Sabrina's bisexual warlock cousin who comes to live with her and her aunts from the Old Country. As punishment by the Witches Council for revealing himself to mortals, he cannot leave the Spellman house. He has two cobra familiars, Nag and Nagaina.
- Harvey Kinkle, a football player and fellow student at Baxter High School. He is Sabrina's boyfriend but is unaware that she and her aunts are witches. After being set up by Madam Satan, he discovers their true nature and is killed by the other witches. Edward is later resurrected in Harvey's body, though Sabrina only believes it to be Harvey.
- Salem, Sabrina's familiar who often acts as the voice of reason. Originally a human named Samuel, he was turned into a cat as punishment by the witches of Salem Village for impregnating a witch named Abigail (unaware that she was a witch) and refusing to marry her. At some point as a cat, he attempted to enact the Book of Revelation. He was given to Sabrina by her aunts and was prophesied by the Devil himself that if he were to do his duty and protect her, then he may become human again.
- Edward Spellman, Sabrina's estranged warlock father and the younger brother of Hilda and Zelda. He quickly rose through the ranks in the Church of Night as a skilled conjuror and eventually became a High Priest. He broke witch-law to marry Diana Sawyer, a mortal, whom he hoped would bear him an heir. When Hilda and Zelda discovered that Edward had been lying to the congregation, they trapped him in a tree as punishment. His ex-lover Madam Satan would go on to vengefully burn the tree, but would also aid in his resurrection into Harvey's body. With Sabrina believing that she brought back Harvey, Edward wonders who could've helped her with such strong magic, and why. He vaguely remembers "Iola" from his past.

=== Other characters ===
- Diana Spellman (née Sawyer), Sabrina's mortal mother, whom she believes to be dead, but is really in a psychiatric facility. Her husband, Edward, turned her insane after she refused to give up her daughter to his sisters. Madam Satan eventually grants Diana her sanity, but makes sure that she'll never be able to convince the doctors to let her leave. Diana is briefly able to contact Sabrina through a dream, but is stopped and Sabrina soon forgets the encounter.
- Rosalind, also called "Roz" and "Rossy" on occasion, a student at Baxter High School who competes with Sabrina for everything from boys to roles in the school play to popularity. Since Rosalind is usually the one losing out, she frequently gossips maliciously about Sabrina to other students. Diana warns Sabrina about Rosalind in a dream, saying that she's not as she seems, but Sabrina forgets by the next morning.
- Nag and Nagaina, Ambrose's cobra familiars who were originally humans (a prince and a princess) that were tricked by a sorcerer into trying to murder their father's bride-to-be and were consequently turned into snakes.
- Betty Cooper and Veronica Lodge, young witches from High Priestess Grundy's coven in Riverdale who were trying to summon a succubus to help them settle a blood-rivalry but instead summoned Madam Satan. Later, they visit Greendale with others from Riverdale High and participate in the search for Harvey. While there, Madam Satan recruits them for a resurrection spell.
- Satan, also known as Lucifer and the Devil, the worshipped figure of the Church of Night. He appears during Sabrina's baptism as a giant humanoid goat. When he appeared to Salem back in 1692, he also displayed a human head.

The series also alludes to and features fictionalized versions of numerous real-world figures, namely Rudyard Kipling, Ann-Margret, Aleister Crowley, Giles Corey, John, Benjamin, William, and Elizabeth Proctor, Abigail Williams, Reverend Parris, Mercy Lewis, Sorcar, and Alphonse Louis Constant.

Fictional characters from other media appear as well such as Martin Coslaw, Miss Lovett, Rikki-Tikki-Tavi, Steven Marcato, and the Three Witches. Figures from demonology include Baphomet, Yan-gant-y-tan, Volac, Beelzebub, Fur-Fur, Cerbere, Ba-El, Empusa, and Stolas.

In addition to Betty and Veronica, several other characters from Archie Comics appear briefly including Archie Andrews, Jughead Jones, Chuck Clayton, Reggie Mantle, Dilton Doiley, Mr. Weatherbee, Nancy Woods, Hot Dog, and Pop Tate.

== Reception ==
The first two issues sold out. Comic Book Resources called it "a surprisingly successful little horror sub-imprint" and "that Aguirre-Sacasa and Hack have created a horror comic that would work well even if it wasn't attached to the iconic 'Sabrina.'" while The Mary Sue said that it was "a refreshing change of pace for a story we all think we know already". IGN gave the first issue an 8.9 out of 10 calling it "something that fans of Afterlife and horror in general will be wanting more of by issue's end." ComicsAlliance called it "a pretty incredible accomplishment" saying that "in a time when we're getting some fantastic horror comics on the stands, Sabrina might just be the best of the bunch."

== Television adaptation ==
In December 2017, a live-action adaptation of Chilling Adventures of Sabrina, produced by Warner Bros. Television and Berlanti Productions, with Roberto Aguirre-Sacasa, Lee Toland Krieger, Greg Berlanti, Sarah Schechter, and Jon Goldwater as executive producers, was picked up by the online streaming service Netflix for a two-season order. Filming took place in Vancouver. The series stars Kiernan Shipka as Sabrina Spellman, Jaz Sinclair as Rosalind Walker, Michelle Gomez as Mary Wardwell / Madam Satan, Chance Perdomo as Ambrose Spellman, Lucy Davis as Hilda Spellman, Miranda Otto as Zelda Spellman, Richard Coyle as Father Blackwood, Ross Lynch as Harvey Kinkle, and Tati Gabrielle as Prudence. The first part of Chilling Adventures of Sabrina was released worldwide on Netflix on October 26, 2018, the second part was released on April 5, 2019, the third part was released on January 24, 2020 and the fourth/final part was released on December 31, 2020.

== Collected editions ==
| Title | ISBN | Release date | Story | Art | Collected material |
|---|---|---|---|---|---|
| Chilling Adventures of Sabrina, Vol. 1: The Crucible | 978-1627389877 | August 18, 2016 | Roberto Aguirre-Sacasa | Robert Hack | Chilling Adventures of Sabrina #1–5 |
| Chilling Adventures Of Sabrina, Vol. 2: Witch-War | 978-1627388030 | October 13, 2022 | Roberto Aguirre-Sacasa | Robert Hack | Chilling Adventures of Sabrina #6–8 |
| Chilling Adventures of Sabrina: Occult Edition | 978-1682557938 | October 17, 2019 | Roberto Aguirre-Sacasa | Robert Hack | Chilling Adventures of Sabrina #1–8 |
| Chilling Adventures of Sabrina Deluxe Edition | 979-8894883489 | November 17, 2026 | Roberto Aguirre-Sacasa, Cullen Bunn | Robert Hack, Dan Schoening | Chilling Adventures of Sabrina #1–9, Chilling Adventures of Salem #1, Archie Horror Presents: The Nine Lives of Salem #1. |
