= 2016–17 DSK Shivajians FC season =

Indian football club season

DSK Shivajians
2016–17 season
- Chairman: DSK Group
- Manager: Dave Rogers
- Stadium: Balewadi Stadium
- I-League: TBD
Home colours	Away colours

The 2016–17 season is the 30th season of competitive football played by DSK Shivajians. The club will play their second season in the I-League and Federation Cup.

== Background ==
=== Transfers ===
==== In ====
No.	Position	Player	Signed From	Date	Ref
	MF	(Republic of Ireland) Shane McFaul	(Finland) KTP	12 August 2016	
	FW	(North Korea) Kim Song-yong	Bengaluru FC	26 August 2016	
	GK	(India) Sayak Barai	AIFF Elite Academy	27 August 2016	
	DF	(India) Maan Singh	Academy	27 August 2016	
	DF	(India) Sairaut Kima	Academy	27 August 2016	
	DF	(India) Lalnunsiama	Academy	27 August 2016	
	MF	(India) Biaklain Paite	Academy	27 August 2016	
	MF	(India) Ameya Ranawade	Academy	27 August 2016	
	MF	(India) Gagandeep Singh	Academy	27 August 2016	
	MF	(India) Vanlalremkima	Academy	27 August 2016	
	MF	(India) Hitova Ayemi	Academy	27 August 2016	
	MF	(India) Lalthathanga Khawlhring	Academy	27 August 2016	
	MF	(India) Rohit Kumar	Academy	27 August 2016	
	FW	(India) Lalawmpuia	Academy	27 August 2016	
	DF	(Bosnia and Herzegovina) Saša Kolunija	(Kazakhstan) Akzhayik	23 November 2016	
	GK	(India) Subrata Pal	NorthEast United	15 December 2016	
	DF	(India) Nirmal Chettri	NorthEast United	15 December 2016	
	FW	(India) Holicharan Narzary	NorthEast United	15 December 2016	
	MF	(India) Sanju Pradhan	Pune City	20 December 2016	

==== Loan in ====
No.	Position	Player	Team	Start Date	Ref
	DF	(India) Jerry Lalrinzuala	Chennaiyin	20 December 2016	
