= Sabrina Spellman =

Fictional half-witch half-human

- Sabrina the Teenage Witch character
- Sabrina Spellman, as drawn by her co-creator Dan DeCarlo, in her debut in Archie's Mad House #22 (October 1962)
- First appearance: Archie's Mad House #22 (October 1962)
- Created by: George Gladir; Dan DeCarlo
- Portrayed by: Melissa Joan Hart (live-action TV film and sitcom); Kiernan Shipka (Chilling Adventures of Sabrina and Riverdale); Mckenna Grace (Chilling Adventures of Sabrina; young)
- Voiced by: Jane Webb (The Archie Show; Filmation series); Joan Gerber (Kenner Talking Show Projector record); Melissa Joan Hart (Sabrina, the Teenage Witch: Spellbound); Emily Hart (Sabrina: The Animated Series); Britt McKillip (Sabrina's Secret Life); Ashley Tisdale (Sabrina: Secrets of a Teenage Witch)

In-universe information
- Aliases: Sabrina Sawyer; Sabrina Edwina Diana Spellman (Chilling Adventures of Sabrina); Sabrina Morningstar (Chilling Adventures of Sabrina)
- Species: Human/Witch Hybrid
- Gender: Female
- Title: Sabrina the Teenage Witch
- Occupation: High school student
- Family: Hilda Spellman (aunt); Zelda Spellman (aunt); Edward Spellman (father); Diana Spellman (mother); Lucifer Morningstar (biological father, Chilling Adventures of Sabrina); At least two other aunts or uncles
- Spouses: Harvey Kinkle; Cthulhu (Afterlife with Archie)
- Significant others: Harvey Kinkle; Nick Scratch (Chilling Adventures of Sabrina and Riverdale Season 6); Archie Andrews
- Relatives: Ambrose Spellman (cousin)
- Nationality: American

Other Information
- Abilities: Magic; High intelligence; Peak-level athleticism

Sabrina Victoria Spellman (Sabrina the Teenage Witch) is the eponymous character of the Archie Comics series Sabrina the Teenage Witch. Sabrina was created by writer George Gladir and artist Dan DeCarlo, and she first appeared in Archie's Mad House #22 in October 1962.

== Creation ==
Sabrina the Teenage Witch debuted in Archie's Madhouse (the logo sometimes given as Archie's Mad House) #22 (Oct. 1962). Created by writer George Gladir and artist Dan DeCarlo, she first appeared in that humor anthology's lead story (the logo then spelled "Teen-Age"), and eventually became one of Archie Comics' major characters, appearing in an animated series and a television sitcom. Gladir recalled in 2007:

"I think we both envisioned it as a one-shot and were surprised when fans asked for more. We continued to do Sabrina stories off and on in Mad House until 1969 when we were flabbergasted to hear it was to become an animated [TV series]. When it came to naming Sabrina I decided to name her after a woman I recalled from my junior high school days ... who was very active in school affairs, and who assigned a number of us to interview prominent people in the media. In addition, the woman's name had a New England ring to it. Some years later I recalled the woman's name was not Sabrina, but actually Sabra Holbrook."

== Fictional character biography ==
Sabrina was created by her two aunts, Hilda and Zelda Spellman, from a magic potion that turned out wrong. However, it was later retconned by the 1996 Sabrina sitcom that Sabrina is a "half-witch" (her mother is an ordinary human, or "mortal" as witches refer to them, while her father is a warlock). She lives with Hilda and Zelda (both witches themselves) in the fictional town of Greendale, which is located somewhere near Riverdale, the home of Archie Andrews, while her father is away. The 1996 live action series also gave Sabrina and her aunts the last name “Spellman”. Also living with the three women as the family pet is Salem Saberhagen. In the original comic stories Salem was a typical witch's cat who did not talk. The 1996 sitcom introduced the idea that Salem was a witch who has been turned into a cat as punishment for world domination attempts.

Most of Sabrina's adventures consist of Sabrina either trying to use her powers in secret to help others – witches generally are not allowed to tell mortals about their abilities or existence – or dealing with the day-to-day trials of being a teenager. A recurring theme in Sabrina's stories is her learning more about the proper use of her powers, either through her aunts or from trips to a magical dimension that is the home of various magical/mythological creatures, including other witches. Various names are given to this dimension; the mid-late 2000s comics refer to it as the "Magic Realm," while the live-action sitcom referred to it as the "Other Realm." These adventures even contained moments where Sabrina had to act as a superhero on occasion.

Sabrina's primary romantic love interest is her mortal boyfriend named Harvey Kinkle who, unlike nearly all the other mortals in Sabrina's world, is aware his girlfriend is a witch.

== Powers and abilities ==
Sabrina possesses a vast range of mystical powers, including the ability to travel through time, fly via broomstick, or shapeshift into anything. She had these capabilities since birth and grown quite comfortable with them. Due to her hybrid nature, she is skilled in alchemy, cheerleading, and journalism.

== Other versions ==
=== Afterlife with Archie ===
Sabrina Spellman appears in the first issue of Afterlife with Archie where she resurrects Hot Dog for Jughead. This starts the zombie apocalypse in Riverdale. She later appears in issue 6 where she is forced to become the bride of Cthulhu.

=== Archie vs. Predator ===
In the crossover Archie vs. Predator, Betty and Veronica go to Sabrina's house to ask for aid when Pop's murder by the Predator is connected to a knife Betty found on their Spring Break vacation. When Sabrina tries performing the spell, the Predator leaps into her house and murders her and Salem. When the police come to check the murder, the house disappears and the police are turned into goats.

=== Chilling Adventures of Sabrina ===
Sabrina Spellman is the main character in Chilling Adventures of Sabrina set in the city of Greendale near Riverdale.

== In other media ==
=== Animation ===
==== Filmation productions ====
Sabrina first appeared in a 1969 segment from Filmation's The Archie Comedy Hour. She later appeared in her own Filmation half-hour series in 1971. Here she is created by Hilda and Zelda Spellman out of magic potions, as well as the accidental addition of items stereotypically associated with teenage girls, such as makeup and dresses.

==== DIC Entertainment productions ====
A 12-year-old version of Sabrina appeared in Sabrina: The Animated Series (1999), produced by DIC Entertainment. The animated series was advertised as a spin-off of the live-action series and borrowed certain elements from it, but it was set in an alternate continuity closer to that of the comics, as it contradicted the live-action show's premise of Sabrina not knowing about magic prior to her sixteenth birthday. This was followed by Sabrina: Friends Forever (2002) and Sabrina's Secret Life (2003–2004), also produced by DIC. In Sabrina: The Animated Series (1999-2000), Emily Hart (Melissa Joan Hart's younger sister) voices the character; Britt McKillip voices Sabrina in Sabrina: Friends Forever and Sabrina's Secret Life.

==== Hub Network production ====
In 2012, Sabrina: Secrets of a Teenage Witch premiered also centering on a younger Sabrina. Ashley Tisdale provided the voice acting for the character.

=== Live action ===
==== Sabrina the Teenage Witch (1996–2003) ====
In 1996, a live-action TV film called Sabrina the Teenage Witch premiered on Showtime, starring Melissa Joan Hart. This movie led to the live-action television series later that same year on ABC which ran for seven seasons until 2003.

Melissa Joan Hart as Sabrina Spellman

On her sixteenth birthday, Sabrina learns that she is a half-witch (through her father's side) and has magical powers. She also learns that her two aunts are witches themselves and that their black cat Salem is a witch who has been turned into a talking household pet as punishment for attempting worldwide domination. At Westbridge High, she befriends Jenny Kelly (and later Valerie Birkhead) and has an on-again, off-again relationship with Harvey Kinkle. She also has to deal with the snobby and headstrong cheerleader, Libby Chessler, who becomes Sabrina's rival for school activities as well as Harvey's affections. In later seasons, Sabrina is enrolled at the fictional Adams College in Boston. After getting her degree in journalism she moves back to her aunts' house with Morgan and Roxie. She took a job with the fictitious Scorch Magazine, a music-themed magazine for which she interviews famous artists. Later on, she meets a man named Aaron, who also worked in the music industry, and the two begin dating. Before long, Aaron proposes, and in the finale, the two are set to wed when unforeseen events took place. Sabrina starts to suspect that Aaron was not the one for her, and after trying to connect her soul stone with his, she becomes sure of it. While the stones mostly fit, it is not a perfect fit. She tries to ignore this but finally follows her heart and cancels the marriage at the altar. When she runs out of the church, she finds Harvey waiting for her outside on his motorcycle, holding his soulstone that Amanda, her cousin, had left him. Harvey and Sabrina toss their soul stones aside and ride off together in true finale fashion, not even noticing that the stones fit together perfectly. For most of the series, Sabrina would regularly cast spells that landed her in trouble, requiring her to turn to her aunts for help. In season 5, after moving out of her aunts' house, Sabrina starts thinking of herself as independent, and whenever something goes wrong, she tries to solve the problem on her own. However, she cannot help but get herself into situations beyond her control (as in the episode Heart of the Matter, when she uses a dating spell to attract boys, but the spell goes wrong when Sabrina's head and heart becoming conflicted. She is then forced to go to Zelda for help).

During her time at Adams College, as revealed in the episode "The Whole Ball of Wax," Sabrina is finally able to meet her mother. However, it is revealed that the Witches' Council had set a decree that if the two were ever to meet face to face, her mother would turn into a ball of wax. While the decree was never repealed, Sabrina accidentally frees her mother by crying into the ball of wax. However, they could not ever see each other face to face again, the one exception being the series finale, in which Hilda volunteered Zelda to be turned into wax until the wedding ended. In the TV movie Sabrina Goes to Rome, Sabrina, accompanied by Salem, travels to Rome, Italy in order to discover the secret of a mysterious antique locket and save her Aunt Sophia. While there, she befriends Gwen, an inexperienced British witch, who helps her to solve the mystery of the locket. The sequel, Sabrina Down Under, depicts Sabrina and Gwen going on vacation in Australia's Great Barrier Reef and end up trying to save a hidden colony of merpeople from water pollution and a scheming marine biologist.

Throughout the series, it is shown that Sabrina has many love interests and boyfriends she has romantic crushes on. Her most prominent one is her first boyfriend, Harvey Dwight Kinkle. In Seasons 1-4 she meets and dates Harvey Kinkle, who becomes her first true love which is proven when Harvey is turned into a frog by her kiss, she takes the test of true love and passes it, proving she truly loves him. Though in the early seasons, they break up but usually make up in the end. However, in an episode of Boy Meets World titled "The Witches of Penbrook", she is seen at the end of the episode on a date with Eric Matthews. When she was dating Dashiell, another magic-powered character, she had to choose between both Dashiell and Harvey and eventually chooses Harvey.

In season 4, she is romantically attracted to Josh who is her manager at the coffee house where she works. She kisses him and Harvey witnesses it causing them to break up though they get back together in "Love Means Having to Say You're Sorry". They officially end their romantic relationship in "The End Of an Era" but Harvey still appears in the show as a recurring character. In season 6, she starts dating Josh who at first dated Morgan, her roommate. Meanwhile, in the season 6 finale, Sabrina gives up her one true love to save her Aunt Hilda and it happens when during her aunt's wedding she falls to pieces when Harvey tells her he still has strong romantic feelings for her but she does not return them, making him leave for California. Josh says he is taking the photography job he was offered in Prague, and a cute waiter named Luke says goodbye but she is saved when her Aunt Zelda gives up her adult years to save her.

In the seventh season, she meets and starts dating Aaron whom she met at the Scorch magazine office. They become engaged but Sabrina's aunt Irma turns him into a goldfish but Aaron is turned back when Harvey (who is in love with Sabrina) uses Sabrina's magic because he wants to make Sabrina happy. In the series finale, Sabrina prepares for her wedding but stops it when she realizes Aaron is not her soulmate and she runs off with Harvey, her soulmate and first true love (they are soulmates because when their soul stones drop to the ground they fit perfectly) at 12:36, the time they first met seven years ago.

==== Chilling Adventures of Sabrina ====
Kiernan Shipka as Sabrina Spellman on Chilling Adventures of Sabrina.

In September 2017, it was announced that Sabrina would return to television in the form of a new live action series that would act as a spin-off to The CW's Riverdale. Prior to that announcement, there were rumors of Sabrina making a guest appearance in Riverdale, perhaps leading the way into her own spin-off series. On December 1, 2017, Deadline Hollywood reported that the series was picked up by Netflix. The first season was released by Netflix on October 26, 2018. The adaptation is a re-imagining of the origin and adventures of Sabrina the Teenage Witch, with a darker and more edgy story that highlights the balance between good and evil. In January 2018, it was announced that Kiernan Shipka had signed on to play the lead role of Sabrina Spellman. In July 2020, Netflix cancelled the series after two seasons divided into four parts.

Sabrina eventually appeared in the Riverdale season six episodes "Chapter Ninety-Nine: The Witching Hour(s)" and "Chapter One Hundred and Fourteen: The Witches of Riverdale".
