= Glory Days (1990 TV series) =

American drama television series

- Genre: Drama
- Created by: Patrick Hasburgh
- Starring: Brad Pitt
- Composer: Patrick Williams
- Country of origin: United States
- Original language: English
- No. of seasons: 1
- No. of episodes: 6 (list of episodes)

Production
- Executive producer: Patrick Hasburgh
- Running time: 60 minutes
- Production companies: Patrick Hasburgh Productions; Orion Television

Original release
- Network: Fox
- Release: July 25 – September 13, 1990

Glory Days is an American drama television series that aired from July 25 until September 13, 1990, on Fox.

== Premise ==
Four people who were friends in high school later start going different ways.

== Cast ==
- Brad Pitt as Walker Lovejoy
- Spike Alexander as Dave Rutecki
- Evan Mirand as Dominic Fopiano
- Nicholas Kallsen as Peter "T-Bone" Trigg
- Beth Broderick as Sheila Jackson
- Robert Costanzo as V.T. Krantz

== Episodes ==
No.	Title	Directed by	Written by	Original release date
1	"The Kids Are Allright"	Anson Williams	Patrick Hasburgh	July 25, 1990
Rutecki shoots an unarmed man and the incident is witnessed by three of his friends.
2	"Blastin' the Blues Away"	Anson Williams	Steven Brill	August 1, 1990
A rap performer is accused of writing lyrics that condone violence against the police.
3	"Whattya Wanna Do Tonight?"	Jonathan Lemkin	Patrick Hasburgh	August 23, 1990
Fopiano dates an overweight woman.
4	"Trigg's Mistaken Identity Crisis"	Marc Laub	Patrick Hasburgh	August 30, 1990
Trigg becomes the prime suspect when he finds a woman after she has been raped.
5	"Tammy Tell Me True"	Anson Williams	Patrick Hasburgh	September 6, 1990
A city councilman falls for a minor.
6	"Precursed"	Marc Laub	Patrick Hasburgh	September 13, 1990
Rutecki finds out that his partner might be involved in a robbery-murder at a chemical warehouse.
