= Moneca Stori =

Retired Canadian voice actress

- Occupation: Actress (formerly)
- Years active: 1997–2018

Moneca Stori is a Canadian former voice actress known mostly for her role as the original voice of Kagome Higurashi in the English version of Inuyasha, as well as her lead role of Laura Haruna in the Hamtaro series. She began her career performing for thousands of children in theater for young audience productions and was also seen in the Vancouver TheatreSports' Jessie Award-winning production of Free Willy Shakespeare. Stori is currently retired as an actress.

== Filmography ==
- Ayakashi: Samurai Horror Tales – Nadeshiko (Tenshu Monogatari segment), additional voices
- Dragon Ball Z (Ocean Group Dub) – Videl
- Elemental Gelade – Arc Aile Rep (Ep. 12)
- Geronimo Stilton – Pandora Woz (Season 1)
- Gundam Wing – Sally Po (Eps. 3, 8, 12), Catherine Bloom, additional voices (Eps. 1–13)
- Hamtaro – Laura Haruna
- Inuyasha – Kagome Higurashi, additional voices
- Inuyasha: Feudal Combat – Kagome Higurashi
- Inuyasha: The Secret of the Cursed Mask – Kagome Higurashi
- Jin-Roh: The Wolf Brigade – Kei Amemiya
- Junkers Come Here – Yoko Inoue
- Maison Ikkoku – Additional voices (Eps. 37–96)
- Mary-Kate and Ashley in Action! – Additional voices
- Master Keaton – Additional voices
- Megaman NT Warrior Axess (TV) – Silk
- Mobile Suit Gundam: Encounters in Space – Noelle Anderson
- Monster Rancher – Michelle (Ep. 60)
- Ranma ½ – Princess Ori, additional voices (Eps. 137–161)
- Sabrina: Friends Forever – Hilda Spellman
- Sabrina's Secret Life – Hilda Spellman
- X-Men: Evolution – Amanda Sefton (Eps. 26-39)
