= Beth Broderick =

American actress (born 1959)

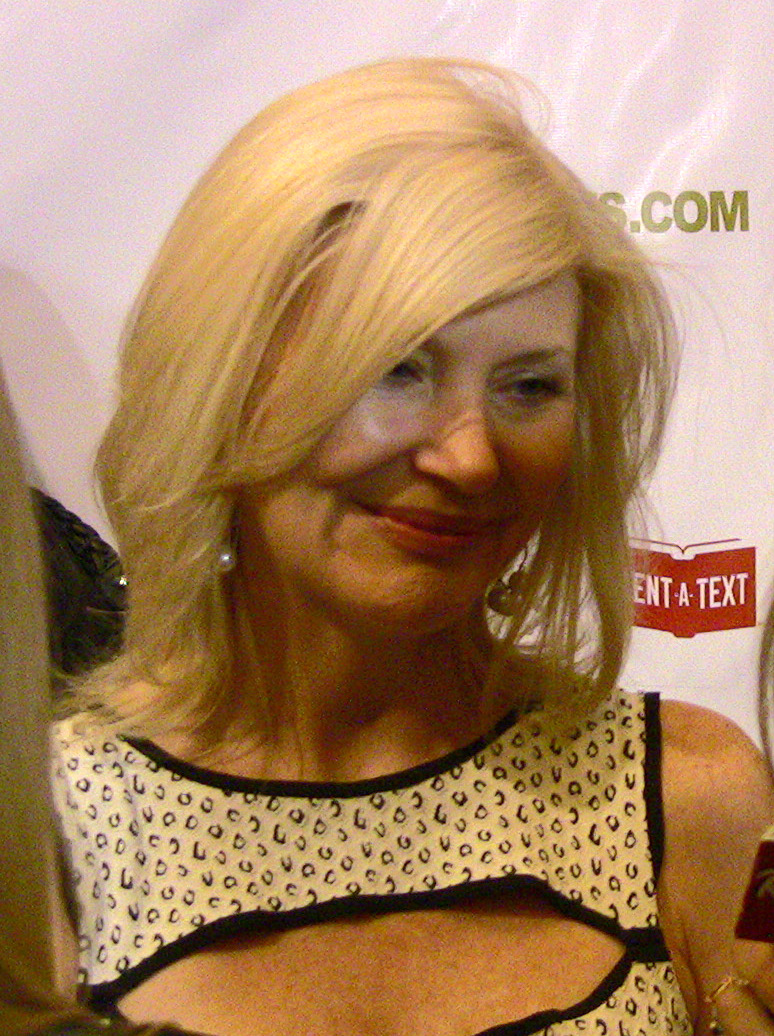
- Broderick in 2011
- Born: Elizabeth Alice Broderick; February 24, 1959 (age 67); Falmouth, Kentucky, U.S.
- Other name: Norris O'Neal
- Education: American Academy of Arts
- Occupation: Actress
- Years active: 1983–present
- Spouses: Brian Porizek (m. 1998; div. 2000) Scott Paetty (m. 2005)

Elizabeth Alice Broderick (born February 24, 1959) is an American actress. She portrayed Zelda Spellman in the ABC/WB television sitcom Sabrina the Teenage Witch (1996–2003). She also had recurring roles as Diane Janssen in the ABC mystery drama series Lost (2005–2008) and as Rose Twitchell in the CBS science fiction drama series Under the Dome (2013).

== Early life ==
Beth Broderick was born in Falmouth, Kentucky, the daughter of Nina Lou (née Bowden) and Thomas Joseph Broderick. She grew up in Huntington Beach, California. Even as a child, she was interested in theater. She graduated from high school at sixteen, and then from the American Academy of Arts in Pasadena, California.

== Career ==
Billed as Elizabeth Alice Broderick, and later as Norris O'Neal, she made her debut in two adult films, In Love (1983) and Bordello: House of the Rising Sun (1985). Both roles portrayed her as a lesbian and were financially unsuccessful. Again as Norris O'Neal, she appeared in the mainstream comedy Sex Appeal (1986). In 1986 she had small roles in If Looks Could Kill, Student Affairs, Young Nurses in Love, and Slammer Girls, a spoof of the women in prison film genre.

Her first significant role was in Stealing Home (1988), in which she played Leslie, a young woman who seduces a teenager (played by Jonathan Silverman). In 1990, she appeared in The Bonfire of the Vanities. Her movie credits include Man of the Year (1995), Maternal Instincts (1996), Breast Men (1997), Psycho Beach Party (2000), and The Inner Circle (2003). She appeared in the movie Fools Rush In (1997), with Matthew Perry and Salma Hayek, as a business woman. She played a crazy religious woman, who together with her husband and brother, torture couples who break the rules of chastity while camping, in the film Timber Falls.

Her television credits include Married... with Children, The 5 Mrs. Buchanans, Hearts Afire, Supernatural and Glory Days. She guest starred on Northern Exposure, in the 1992 episode "It Happened In Juneau", playing a lusty doctor hunting for a one-night stand with Dr. Joel Fleischman, played by Rob Morrow. In 1997 she appeared in the racy Showtime series Women: Stories of Passion ("The Bitter and the Sweet" 2:17). She had a minor, recurring role in the hit ABC series Lost as Kate Austen's mother, Diane. She played a minor role in CSI: Miami during a tsunami where she played a neighbor of CSI Ryan Wolfe's uncle. More recently, she had guest starring roles on Leverage and Castle. In 2019, she was in "Sister of the Bride", a Hallmark channel movie.

She has appeared in several theater productions like Carnal Knowledge, Triplets in Uniform and Zastrozzi, the Master of Discipline (which she also co-produced). In New York she has starred in The Mousetrap, The Lion in Winter and many more. She was recently in the Chicago Northlight Theatre production of the one-woman show titled Bad Dates.

Broderick has written A Cup of Joe, Wonderland and Literatti with Dennis Bailey.

She directed three episodes of Sabrina, the Teenage Witch: "Guilty!" (2002), "Cloud Ten" (2002), and "Making the Grade" (2001).

== Personal life ==
Broderick had a year-long romance with director Brian De Palma during production of The Bonfire of the Vanities (1990). She married Scott Paetty on April 29, 2005.

Broderick is a founding member of Momentum, one of the first organizations in New York established to assist people with AIDS. She is also a founding member of the Celebrity Action Council of the City Light Women's Rehabilitation Program, which provides hands-on service to homeless women, helping them overcome substance abuse and learn job skills.

Broderick lived in Austin, Texas, as of 2014, where she appears in indie films and local theater productions.

== Filmography ==
=== Film ===
Year	Title	Role	Notes
1983	In Love	Ella	As Beth Alison Broderick
1985	Bordello: House of the Rising Sun	Caz Wilcox	As Norris O'Neil
1986	If Looks Could Kill	Newswoman	
1986	Sex Appeal	Fran	As Norris O'Neil
1987	Student Affairs	Alexis	
1987	Slammer Girls	Abigail	
1988	Stealing Home	Lesley	
1989	Young Nurses in Love	Putnam	
1990	The Bonfire of the Vanities	Caroline Heftshank	
1991	Thousand Pieces of Gold	Berthe	
1992	The Silencer	Barbie Rodgers (uncredited)	
1995	French Exit	Andie Ross	
1995	Man of the Year	Kelly Bound	
1996	Maternal Instincts	Dr. Eva Warden	
1997	Women Without Implants		Short film
1997	Fools Rush In	Tracey Verna (uncredited)	
1997	Breast Men	Terri	
2000	Psycho Beach Party	Mrs. Ruth Forrest	
2003	Inside the Inner Circle	Herself	Short film
2005	Tom's Nu Heaven		
2005	The Inner Circle	Jean	
2006	State's Evidence	Scott's Mom	
2007	Timber Falls	Ida	
2011	Bad Actress	Alyssa Rampart-Pillage	
2011	Fly Away	Jeanne	
2011	Retail Therapy	Celebrity Customer	Short film
2014	Two Step	Dot	
2015	Echoes of War	Doris McCluskey	
2018	Crash Blossom	Nancy O'Connor	
2018	The Neighborhood Watch	Gladys	
2020	Becoming	Angela Corrigan	
2020	The Fox Hunter	Nancy O'Connor	
2020	Law of Attraction	Rhonda	
2021	Something About Her	Jane	
2023	One True Loves	Francine	
2023	The Nana Project	Kitty	
2024	Holiday Mismatch	Barbara	
2024	The Merry Gentlemen	Lily	

=== Television ===
Year	Title	Role	Notes
1988	Matlock	Jane Barnes	Episode: "The Hucksters"
1988–1989	1st & Ten: The Championship		Episodes: "Injustice for All" & "Duty Calls"
1989	Hooperman	Europa	Episode: "Intolerance"
1989	The Nutt House	Gwen Goode	Episode: "A Frick Called Wanda"
1989	Mancuso, F.B.I.	Dallas	Episode: "Suspicious Minds"
1990	Murphy Brown	Rita	Episode: "Bad Girls"
1990	Glory Days	Sheila Jackson	6 episodes
1990	Married... with Children	Miss Penza	Episode: "And Baby Makes Money"
1991	Get a Life	Jackie	Episode: "Chris and Larry Switch Lives"
1991	Doctor Doctor	Roxanne Abrams	Episode: "Two Angry Men"
1991	Rewrite for Murder		TV movie
1991	Drexell's Class	Maria	Episode: "Bully for Otis"
1992	Are You Lonesome Tonight	Laura	TV movie
1992	Northern Exposure	Linda Angelo	Episode: "It Happened in Juneau"
1992	In the Deep Woods	Myra Cantrell	TV movie
1992–1993	Hearts Afire	Dee Dee Starr	25 episodes
1993	Hearts Afire	Lee Ann Folsom	7 episodes
1993	Shadowhunter	Bobby Cain	TV movie
1994	Justice in a Small Town	Melissa Brewer	TV movie
1994–1995	The 5 Mrs. Buchanans	Delilah Buchanan	17 episodes
1996–2002	Sabrina the Teenage Witch	Zelda Spellman	Main role; 141 episodes
1997	Women: Stories of Passion	Ellie	Episode: "The Bitter and the Sweet"
1997	Teen Angel	Zelda Spellman	Episode: "One Dog Night"
1997	Men in Black: The Series	Aileen (voice)	Episode: 'The Inanimate Syndrome"
1998	A Champion's Fight	Patricia Ellis	TV movie
2002	The Nightmare Room	Real Madame Zora (uncredited)	Episode: "My Name Is Evil"
2003	The Lyon's Den	Lana Olmstead	Episode: "Separation Anxiety"
2004	Homeland Security	Elise McKee	TV movie
2004	CSI: Miami	Mona	Episode: "Crime Wave"
2006	Supernatural	Alice Miller	Episode: "Nightmare"
2006	The Closer	Morgan Bloom	Episode: "Head Over Heels"
2007	Bionic Woman	Alexis	Episode: "The List"
2007	CSI: Crime Scene Investigation	Belinda / Linda	Episode: "Cockroaches"
2005–2008	Lost	Diane Janssen	5 episodes
2008	ER	Edith Landry	Episode: "Tandem Repeats"
2009	Two Dollar Beer	Mom	TV movie
2009	Cold Case	Libby Traynor	Episode: "Jackals"
2009	Leverage	Monica Hunter	Episode: "The Three Days of the Hunter Job"
2010	Castle	Barbara Mann	Episode: "The Late Shaft"
2010	Revenge of the Bridesmaids	Olivia McNabb	TV movie
2010	Lone Star	Carol	Episodes: "Pilot" & "One in Every Family"
2013	Under the Dome	Rose Twitchell	5 episodes
2014	Melissa & Joey	Dr. Ellen Radier	Episodes: "Accidents Will Happen" & "Witch Came First"
2014	A Perfect Christmas List	Michelle	TV movie
2016	Late Bloomer	Eileen Taft	TV movie
2017	Bosch	Judge Sharon Houghton	3 episodes
2017	A Very Merry Toy Store	Pam Forrester	TV movie
2017	Romance at Reindeer Lodge	Penny	TV movie
2018	Sharp Objects	Annie B	5 episodes
2019	Christmas Town	Betty	Hallmark Channel Original Movie
2019	Always and Forever Christmas	Carol	Lifetime Channel Original Movie
2019	Sister of the Bride	Eleanore	TV movie
2019	My Best Friend's Christmas	Sheila Seever	TV movie
2020	Chilling Adventures of Sabrina	Sitcom Zelda Spellman (modified version)	2 episodes
2021	Walker	Mrs. Harlan	Episode : "Don't Fence Me In"
2021	Shrill	Clara	Episode : "Ranchers"
2022	When I Think of Christmas	Anna	Hallmark Channel Original Movie
2022	Criminal Minds	Senator Martha Reeves	Episode : "Oedipus Wrecks"
2023	Love & Death	Bertha Pomeroy	
2024	Holliday Mismatch	Barbara	Hallmark Channel Original Movie

=== Video games ===
Year	Title	Role	Notes
1999	Sabrina, the Teenage Witch: Spellbound	Zelda Spellman	
