= Sabrina: Secrets of a Teenage Witch =

- Genre: Fantasy; Magical girl Comedy
- Based on: Sabrina the Teenage Witch by: George Gladir Dan DeCarlo
- Developed by: Pamela Hickey; Dennys McCoy
- Written by: Pamela Hickey; Dennys McCoy; Dean Batali
- Directed by: Trevor Wall
- Voices of: Ashley Tisdale; Ian James Corlett; Tabitha St. Germain; Erin Mathews; Maryke Hendrikse; Kathleen Barr; Matthew Erickson; Rebecca Shoichet
- Opening theme: "Cast My Spell on You"
- Ending theme: "Cast My Spell on You"
- Composers: Noam Kaniel; Nicholas Varley
- Countries of origin: United States; France; Ireland; India
- Original language: English
- No. of seasons: 1
- No. of episodes: 26

Production
- Executive producers: Nicolas Atlan; Mike Young; Jon Goldwater; David Uslan; Christophe Di Sabantino; Paul Cummins; D. S. Kulkarni; Satyajeet Kumar; Srikanth Pottekula
- Producers: Jeffery St. Ours; Siobhán Ní Ghadhra
- Running time: 21–22 minutes
- Production companies: Splash Entertainment (Note: Known as MoonScoop Entertainment in episodes 1–18.); MoonScoop; DSK Entertainment; Laughing Lion; Telegael Teoranta; Riverdale Productions

Original release
- Network: Hub Network
- Release: October 12, 2013 – June 7, 2014

Sabrina: Secrets of a Teenage Witch is an animated television series on the Hub Network based on the Archie Comics series Sabrina the Teenage Witch. The series was co-produced by MoonScoop Entertainment/Splash Entertainment, MoonScoop, DSK Entertainment, Laughing Lion, Telegael Teoranta, and Archie Comics Publications, Inc. with the participation of The Walt Disney Company. The series was developed by Pamela Hickey and Dennys McCoy and was acquired by the Hub Network on October 1, 2012. The series was originally intended for a summer 2013 release but was delayed to fall 2013, and ran for only one season. This was also the last production by MoonScoop before it was filed for bankruptcy.

The series features famous celebrity Ashley Tisdale as the voice of Sabrina.

== Premise ==
The series tells the story of a young teenager named Sabrina Spellman, who is born as a half-witch and a half-human. She lives a double life as a normal high school student and as a sorceress-in-training in the magical world. Once her two worlds collide, Sabrina is the only one who has the rare mystical ability to battle her enemies while also attempting to maintain her secret identity/life as a half witch from all of the humans around her.

Unlike previous versions, Sabrina is shown to be a witch princess; as she is destined to rule all of the magical world one day as queen. Sabrina's pet is a black cat, named Salem, who is a spy sent by Enchantra to make Sabrina's life in the human world unbearable enough to live in the witch world permanently; in order for Enchantra to drain Sabrina of her great magical powers, and become the strongest and the most feared sorceress in all of Witch World.

== Voice cast ==
- Ashley Tisdale as 16-year-old Sabrina Spellman, the main character.
- Ian James Corlett as:
  - Salem, Sabrina's cat
  - Professor Geist, a Scottish warlock and teacher at Witch School.
- Tabitha St. Germain as:
  - Hilda Spellman, one of Sabrina's paternal aunts. She is quite cheerful and outgoing. She wears spectacles and is plump.
  - Veralupa, a good friend of Sabrina's at Witch School who is a werewolf/witch hybrid. Her magic is yellow like her outfit.
- Erin Mathews as:
  - Zelda Spellman, Hilda's older sister and Sabrina's other paternal aunt with whom she lives in the bakery Spellman's Brew.
  - Jessie, an African American friend of Sabrina in the mortal world, and the only human who knows and accepts Sabrina and her developing witch magic.
- Maryke Hendrikse as Amy, a snobby and arrogant girl at Greendale High School who expresses how weird she thinks Sabrina is.
- Kathleen Barr as:
  - Enchantra, the evil, racist and peer-pressuring principal of Witch School who wants to take over the world by attempting to make Sabrina remain in the magical world as queen. She would then drain the teenage queen of all of her magical powers and rule Witch World with absolute power.
  - Tiffany Titan, a grumpy security guard at Sabrina's human school who believes in the existence of magic and witches, and will do anything to prove it.
  - Londa and Zanda, fraternal twins who are friends with Sabrina, Ambrose and Veralupa. Londa has blue hair and Zanda has orange hair.
- Matthew Erickson as Harvey Kinkle, a nerdy boy who accidentally and unknowingly becomes a mindless werewolf every full moon but is successfully cured in Episode 10.
- Andrew Francis as Ambrose Spellman, Sabrina's first cousin.
- James Higuchi as Shinji, Enchantra's bratty son who hates Sabrina.
- David A. Kaye as Jim, Sabrina's crush in the mortal world.
- Rebecca Shoichet as Spella, Enchantra's evil older sister who debuted in the series finale bearing her name. She is defeated by the combined magics of her younger sister, her nephew, Sabrina, Ambrose, Veralupa, Professor Geist, Londa and Zanda.

== Episodes ==
No.	Title	Written by	Original release date	US viewers (millions)
1	"Dances with Werewolves"	Pamela Hickey & Dennys McCoy	October 12, 2013	0.269
When magic makes its way from Witch World into the human world, Sabrina must protect her best friend, Harvey, who is forever changed by it as he is turned into a savagely violent werewolf every full moon.
2	"Scream It with Flowers"	Dan Wicksman & Nuria Wicksman	October 19, 2013	0.247
Enchantra puts a dark curse on the red roses Sabrina brings to school to give to her human friends on Valentine's Day. With Veralupa's help, Sabrina must gather all of the snarling fanged roses to keep her human friends safe from being eaten alive.
3	"Ice Giant for Tea"	Dan Wicksman & Nuria Wicksman	October 26, 2013	0.260
When Sabrina has both a school play and a witch battle with her and her cousin Ambrose against an Ice Giant on the same night, her friendship with Jessie - the only human that knows that she is a witch - is put to the test; especially with Enchantra's arrogant son, Shinji, running interference during the battle.
4	"Shock Rock"	Peter Lawrence	November 2, 2013	0.166
Sabrina is in charge of finding a band for a benefit concert in Greendale, but Shinji's plans to put together his own band in Witch World makes Sabrina's job much more difficult.
5	"No Time"	Alastair Swinnerton	November 9, 2013	0.274
Time freezes in the human world when Sabrina accidentally loses the Hourglass of Horus that regulates time between both the human and witch worlds.
6	"Faking Up Is Hard to Do"	Robin Stein	November 16, 2013	0.175
Sabrina is forced to cancel her plans with Jim when Enchantra insists that she and Shinji have a romantic dinner together in Witch World.
7	"Hic! Hic! Boom!"	Alastair Swinnerton	November 23, 2013	0.183
When Shinji kidnaps a baby dragon during a class assignment, it gets loose in the human world with a bad case of fiery hiccups in the form of fireballs. Sabrina must find and return it to its mother, who is angrily attacking Enchantra and the other wizards and witches until her baby is safety returned.
8	"Best Friends Fighting"	Dan Wicksman & Nuria Wicksman	November 30, 2013	0.138
Enchantra turns Sabrina and Jessie from best friends to sworn enemies by hiding fighting sprites in their true friendship bracelets. Sabrina, being half-witch, manages to break free and now she must save Jessie before she hurts herself and their intense friendship.
9	"Return of the Werewolf"	Peter Lawrence	December 7, 2013	0.101
During a full moon, Harvey turns into a werewolf and runs amok. So Sabrina and Veralupa try to get him back home safely.
10	"Creatures and Caves"	Darren Jones	December 14, 2013	0.178
The kids engage in a role-playing game in the woods. But the game soon becomes a reality after they unknowingly enter the magical world via a secret mystical portal hidden in a tree.
11	"See No Sabrina, Hear No Sabrina"	Alastair Swinnerton	December 28, 2013	0.105
Salem feels Sabrina is ignoring him and tries to turn Jim invisible but accidentantly casts it on Sabrina and must figure out how to reverse it.
12	"Hurry Scurry"	Alastair Swinnerton	January 4, 2014	0.230
When Sabrina's spell goes awry, she turns her professor into a chicken and aunts into mice and must reverse the spell before Salem gets hungry.
13	"Ultra-Stitious"	Justine Cheynet & Sandrine Laprevote	January 11, 2014	0.192
When faced with a lack of superstitious humans, Sabrina's tasked with increasing humans' superstitions, in order to recharge the wands of her and her friends, but she does her job too well and they become overly superstitious, creating a dangerous vortex in the Witch World.
14	"Sabrina the Troll Princess"	Dan Wicksman & Nuria Wicksman	March 15, 2014	0.124
Sabrina gets amnesia and is abducted by trolls, who is tricked into thinking she's a princess of trolls. Before long, the trolls use her powers to ambush witch school.
15	"Baby-Witching"	Sylvie Barro & Maud Loisillier	March 22, 2014	0.199
Sabrina offers to babysit Jessie's kid cousin, but finds that its much harder than she thought, especially when a magical spell of Enchantra's grants the child super-human strength.
16	"Night Pests"	Dan Wicksman & Nuria Wicksman	March 29, 2014	0.165
Sabrina has a recurring nightmare. She then finds out that her human and witch friends are having the same dreams.
17	"A Renewed Sense of Magic"	Christopher Panzner	April 5, 2014	0.130
Sabrina must be the responsible one when her aunts become teenagers all over again.
18	"Super-Brina"	Dan Wicksman & Nuria Wicksman	April 12, 2014	0.117
Harvey believes Sabrina is a superhero when he accidentally sees her use her powers.
19	"Home Sweet Home"	Benoit Grenier	April 19, 2014	0.195
Sabrina calls on a member of the Witch World to help when Spellman's Brew faces being torn down.
20	"Now You See It..."	Benoit Grenier	April 26, 2014	0.270
Harvey finds Sabrina's wand and uses it in his magic act in the school talent show.
21	"Magic No More"	Darren Jones	May 3, 2014	0.161
The witches lose their magic due to an illness, so Sabrina and Shinji look for the illness' origin while the trolls plot an attack on the sickly witches.
22	"What a Ride"	Justine Cheynet & Sandrine Laprevote	May 10, 2014	0.272
Sabrina's aunts employ her to make deliveries for them, but problems arise when Shinji gets trapped inside of Sabrina's scooter.
23	"Who Let the Cat Out?"	Benoit Grenier	May 17, 2014	N/A
Fed up with doing Enchantra's bidding, Salem runs away and takes a human form.
24	"Chariots of Fear"	Jimmy Hibbert	May 24, 2014	N/A
Sabrina goes on the treacherous and dangerous "journey of one thousand steps" through Witch World with Shinji, and Hilda pretends to be Sabrina at school to cover for her absence. Little do they know that it is another of Enchantra's plans to get her son and Sabrina together.
25	"Careful What You Witch For"	Benoit Grenier	May 31, 2014	N/A
After being freed by Sabrina, an overeager genie known as Djinn grants all of her wishes, along with the wishes of everyone in Greendale.
26	"Spella"	Dan Wicksman & Nuria Wicksman	June 7, 2014	N/A
Sabrina and Enchantra are both exiled to Earth by Enchantra's evil older sister Spella, so they must join forces in order to return and stop Spella for good. They must gather the earthly counterparts of the mystical items that banished them to return to the magical world. They do so with aid from Zelda and Hilda, and combine their magic with that of Professor Geist, Shinji, Veralupa, Ambrose and the twins Londa and Zanda to save all of Witch World.

== Broadcast ==
The series was broadcast on most Disney Channel networks outside North America.

In the United Kingdom, the series aired on Pop.
