= DSK Group =

Indian industrial conglomerate

- Company type: Private
- Industry: Conglomerate
- Headquarters: DSK House, Jangli Maharaj Road, Pune, India
- Area served: Worldwide
- Key people: D.S. Kulkarni (founder, chairman, managing director)
- Website: www.dskgroup.co.in

The DSK Group was a business conglomerate headquartered in Pune, India, with a presence in domains including real estate, automobile, technology, sports, information technology, and education. The group was founded by Deepak Sakharam Kulkarni, who is also its chairman and managing director. The group was a multi-crore business with a turnover of over INR 4,000 crores. It had operations in India (Pune, Mumbai, Nashik, Bengaluru and Chennai) and the US.

== Insolvency, bankruptcy, and liquidation ==
In October of 2016, the group defaulted on its payments to fixed deposit holders. The group's chairman, Deepak Sakharam Kulkarni, blamed this default on the slowdown of his real estate business. As the payments stopped for subsequent months as well, the depositors became restive, and some of them staged a protest. A few approached RTI activist Vijay Kumbhar, who started blogging about the company's deals. In his first blog, Kumbhar had alleged that the fixed deposit scheme run by Kulkarni did not have sanction of the Reserve Bank of India. He also alleged shady land deals by Kulkarni's family members at the expense of the public listed company, DSK Developers Limited (DSKDL).

In November, Kulkarni refuted these allegations. By that time, news had started trickling in of the company’s attempts to offload its Toyota arm to raise money to pay the depositors. Work on many ongoing projects were also stalled, with buyers threatening to go to the police. Depositors, many of them senior citizens, organised themselves and contemplated legal action. The first of many FIRs against the builder was filed with the Pune City Police. The Economic Offences Wing wrote to the Inspector General of Registration, asking it to keep the police informed in case the company made any property transfers. Two more FIRs followed.

Construction on the company's DreamCity project, an 8,000-crore integrated township spread over 300 acres of land, came to a halt, amid allegations of unfair land deals by his family members. Surrounded by problems from all sides, Kulkarni blamed circumstances — the slowdown in the real-estate sector and demonetisation — for his company's problems. He kept assuring his investors that he was not running away and would pay back all their dues. He even got MNS chief Raj Thackeray to support him. Thackeray held a meeting with protesting depositors in November and asked them to trust the builder. He claimed that "non-Marathi businessmen backed by politicians" were trying to destroy DSK.

In his press conference in November, Kulkarni had said, "If you take the assets of the construction group, it amounts to above Rs 9,000 crore, and our dues hardly stand at Rs 1,500 crore. The total dues of the fixed deposit holders is only Rs 589 crore, which is due in 2020. So there is no question of not paying them... We have made a plan for timely payout of our deposit holders and once the court gives us the green signal, we will start..." However, when the courts asked him to pay, all he offered was promises. On December 4, he told the Bombay High Court he would pay Rs 50 crore as security within 15 days. After that, he obtained a further four-weeks time from the Supreme Court. In the third week of January, the company told the Bombay High Court that the amount was being transferred from a bank in Singapore. It claimed that the transaction had already been initiated and would be credited to its domestic accounts within three days. This also turned out to be a false assurance.

Kulkarni held another press conference on February 8, this time claiming that his company was in the process of raising money through crowdfunding. The Bombay High Court withdrew its protection from arrest it had granted to the builder. Within hours, the Pune Police retrieved him from Delhi.

== Current status ==
The Supreme Court on 27 July 2022 granted bail to Kulkarni. The apex court bench of Justice S Abdul Nazeer and Justice J K Maheshwari said in a brief order:

"Having heard learned counsel for the parties and having perused the record, we are of the view that the petitioner (DSK) be released on bail, therefore, we direct the release of the petitioner on bail subject to the conditions to be imposed by the trial court."

== List of companies ==
- DSK Developers Ltd., is the flagship company of DSK Group. It is a real estate company.
- DSK Toyota is the largest distributor of Toyota cars in India.
- DSK Entertainment is the IP creation and entertainment arm of the DSK Group. Its first project, Sabrina: Secrets of a Teenage Witch, in association with MoonScoop Group and Archie Comics, won an Emmy Award for outstanding achievement in the main title and graphic design.
