= Hilda Spellman =

Fictional character from Sabrina the Teenage Witch

- Sabrina the Teenage Witch character
- Hilda Spellman (center) and Sabrina Spellman (bottom right), from Sabrina the Teenage Witch (volume 2) #31, November 1999. Art by Dan DeCarlo.
- First appearance: Archie's Mad House #19 (June 1962)
- Created by: Bob White
- Portrayed by: Sherry Miller (Film); Caroline Rhea (1996 TV series); Lucy Davis (Chilling Adventures of Sabrina)
- Voiced by: Jane Webb (Filmation series); Caroline Rhea (video game); Melissa Joan Hart (DIC series); Moneca Stori (Secret Life); Tabitha St. Germain (Hub series)

In-universe information
- Aliases: Hildegarde Antoinette Spellman (full name); TV; Helga Stillwell (penname)
- Gender: Female
- Occupation: Witch
- Relatives: Comics; Sabrina Spellman (niece); Zelda Spellman (sister); Ambrose Spellman (nephew); Esmerelda Spellman (niece); Edward Spellman (brother); Della Spellman (sister/aunt); TV; Great-Granny (great-grandmother); Sucker Hyphen Baffoon (grandmother; deceased); Lydia Spellman (mother); Beulah Spellman (paternal aunt); Dorma Spellman (paternal aunt); Irma Spellman (maternal aunt); Vesta Spellman (older sister); Edward "Ted" Spellman (younger brother); Sophia Spellman (younger sister); Marigold Wiccan (cousin); Mortimer (cousin); Doris (cousin); Zsa Zsa Goowhiggie (cousin); Monty (cousin); Stanislav (cousin); Father Christmas (cousin); Emperor Larry (cousin); Susie (cousin); Pele (cousin); Boyd, Racine and Maw Maw (country cousins)
- Nationality: American but possibly British (Chilling Adventures of Sabrina)

Other Information
- Abilities: Magic mastery
- Hair Color: Comics: Red; TV: Blonde
- Eye Color: Black

Hildegarde Antoinette "Hilda" Spellman is a character featured in the Archie comic book Sabrina the Teenage Witch. Hilda is a full witch (as opposed to half or fully mortal) who lives in the fictional town of Greendale (in the 1990s live-action sitcom, Hilda lives in fictional Westbridge, Massachusetts). Hilda lives with her niece Sabrina Spellman, her sister Zelda Spellman, and the family cat Salem, a former witch turned into a cat as punishment for his attempt at world domination.

== History and character ==
Hilda was believed to be born in the year 1397. She was debuted as "Hilda the Witch" in Archie's Mad House #19 (June 1962) as an ugly witch with dark hair and green skin. She was featured throughout the series in solo stories, as well as the "host" of the comic book (in a role similar to the Crypt-Keeper from the Tales from the Crypt comic book series). During her early appearances in Archie's Mad House, she was not connected to the Sabrina stories. However, a prototype of the "Aunt Hilda" character named "Greta the Fairy Witch Mother" (who debuted in Archie's Mad House #28 and was similar in physical appearance to Hilda the Witch) appeared in early Sabrina stories. Eventually, Hilda the Witch and Greta the Fairy Witch Mother evolved into the Aunt Hilda character in Archie's Mad House #37 (although the Greta character reappeared one last time in Archie's Mad House #45).

Upon becoming Aunt Hilda, the character was depicted as a tall and thin Caucasian woman with red hair. She tended to be short-tempered and more prone to acting like an evil witch. She was the more prominent of Sabrina's two aunts, appearing in more stories than Zelda. In one story, she was stated to be seven hundred years old, although in one episode of the live action series she claims to be six hundred and twelve years old. Hilda's wardrobe was that of a traditional/stereotypical witch.

Starting in the late 1990s, Hilda's (and Zelda)'s appearances and personalities were revamped to make her more contemporary (as well as match the live-action sitcom's take on the character). In modern stories, Hilda has her trademark orange hair, but appears to physically be only a few years older than Sabrina and dresses in modern fashions.

== In other media ==
=== Sabrina the Teenage Witch (sitcom) ===
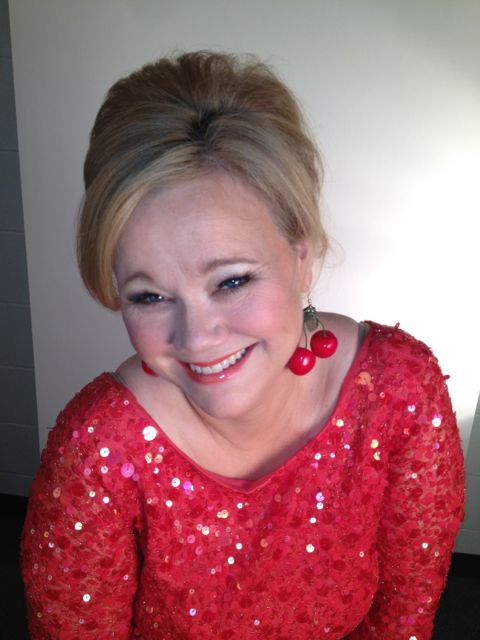
Caroline Rhea plays Hilda on Sabrina the Teenage Witch.

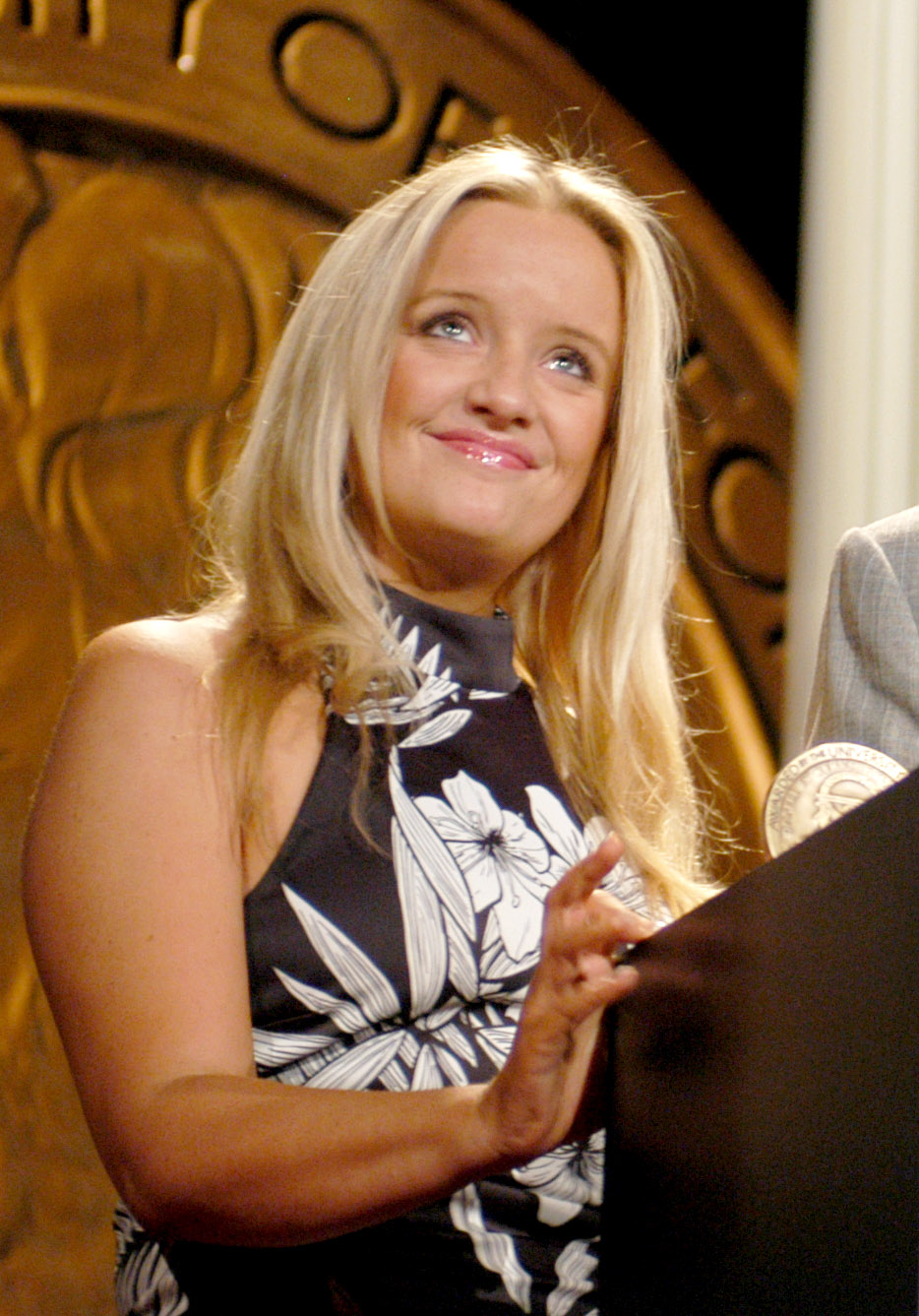
Lucy Davis plays Hilda on Chilling Adventures of Sabrina.

Hilda (a blonde in the series, whose full name is revealed to be Hildegarde Antoinette Spellman) is portrayed as less pragmatic than her sister Zelda, often doing things on a whim (such as buying a clock shop or running for political office). Though these endeavors rarely come to fruition. She is far more lenient and fun-loving than Zelda, and is usually tolerant of Sabrina's schemes and mistakes, having gotten into many mishaps in her own youth.

As a witch, Hilda's magical abilities often manifested as a puff of smoke, and was accompanied by a "bong" sound (as opposed to Zelda Spellman's stream of violet sparkles or Sabrina Spellman's orange sparkles.) Hilda was portrayed by actress Caroline Rhea.

==== Childhood ====
Hilda grew up with at least five siblings: Vesta being the oldest; Edward, Della, Sophia, the youngest, and her sister Zelda whom she lives with.

Vesta was terribly jealous of all the attention that Hilda and Zelda got when they were little. So, she turned their parents into pigs. The Witches Council decided that people with pigs feet could not raise children and so when Vesta refused to turn them back Hilda and Zelda were adopted out to a family in the country.

While the children were living in the farm house the parents stayed in the barn. Their father was "getting very good at working an Instamatic with his snout". When their mother headbutted Vesta about a month later, they were turned back into humans. In order to legally get Hilda and Zelda back, they had to adopt them.

Their overbearing mother, Grandma Lydia, spent 200 years of violin lessons on Hilda. The first thing little Hilda ever zapped was a little clay horse.

==== Adulthood ====
As Hilda reached adulthood she went off to college. Hilda went to Clown College and her roommate was Bobo, a monkey. Hilda graduated magna cum seltzer.

When Hilda was 48 she had her first kiss, and was later engaged to Drell- the wedding took place at the Acropolis. Drell stood Hilda up at the altar, causing an infuriated Hilda to destroy the Acropolis, although history later blamed the Turks.

Hilda bounced from one job to another over the centuries while trying to find what she wanted to do. Her jobs included being a blacksmith and donkey walker, in addition to deep sea fishing, which she rated as being her worst job. During the early 19th century, Hilda and Zelda worked together at a saloon before eventually being run out of town, but they found a way to maintain some financial security: junk. During the early 1970s, Hilda went to work for Salem Saberhagen as his secretary. Salem was found out by the Witch's Council, and as punishment was turned into a witch-familiar as a cat; Hilda was forced to keep him worm-free for a century, but she was pardoned at the end of Season Five. But she still keeps Salem. In the early 1990s, before Sabrina came to live with Hilda and Zelda, they had manservants, spent late nights on the town, weekends in Tuscany, took part in Formula One racing, and originally had a disco on the second floor of their house. They decided to turn it into a normal household.

In the season 6 finale Hilda meets her true love; Will, the train conductor from the episode Murder on the Halloween Express. They decide to get married in the finale when Hilda meets him at an Other Realm mall. Zelda and Sabrina, thinking the relationship is just a rebound and a huge mistake, break Hilda and Will up. When Will leaves, Hilda turns to stone, meaning Will was indeed her true love. Realizing this, Sabrina barters her love life for Hilda, causing Josh and Harvey to walk out on her. Zelda, however, trades her years of experience for Sabrina, and it is assumed she travels to the other Realm with Will and Hilda.

=== Filmation animated series ===
Hilda's first non-comics appearance was on the 1969–70 Filmation animated series The Archie Comedy Hour. Hilda was similar to her then-current comics portrayal, with a typical "witch" appearance and attire, as well as disapproval of Sabrina doing good deeds, and thus (as ordered by Della the Head Witch) was always trying to get her to do bad deeds (like all the other witches). Hilda also had a typical "witch" cackle. Hilda was voiced by Jane Webb.

=== DIC animated series ===
Hilda appears as a character in both Sabrina: The Animated Series and Sabrina's Secret Life. Melissa Joan Hart provided her voice in the first series while in the second series she is voiced by Moneca Stori. Hilda appeared radically different from her comic book appearances; here, she is depicted as a brunette with an olive complexion. Hilda had the same basic personality as in the live-action sitcom. She is depicted as a teenager (instead of the usual middle-aged adult), despite being the same age as in other media (hundreds of years old). It is mentioned in passing that she and Zelda have temporally been changed into their mind into a teenage mind by head witch Enchantra as punishment for minor crimes, but the situation is never fully explained. In Sabrina: The Animated Series both attend high school and are not considered legal adults in the mortal world, which is why Sabrina's maternal great-uncle Quigley (an original character created for the series) lives with them.

=== Secrets of a Teenage Witch ===
Hilda appeared in the animated series Sabrina: Secrets of a Teenage Witch, voiced by Tabitha St. Germain. Here, she and Zelda run a bakery and again look after Sabrina. In this series, Hilda looks more like her sister did in the early comics, but with blonde hair similar to Sabrina's.

=== Chilling Adventures of Sabrina ===
Hilda appears in the Netflix series Chilling Adventures of Sabrina, based on the eponymous comic. She is played by Lucy Davis. Retaining her full name from Sabrina the Teenage Witch, Hildegarde Antoinette Spellman. Hilda has an English accent and is referred to in several episodes as British or coming from England. The details of how she arrived in America are unclear. Hilda is a member of the Church of Night, a powerful coven of Satanic witches. In keeping with earlier appearances, Hilda is the easier-going of the sisters, although she is portrayed as something of a mother hen rather than a prankster. She is also less devoted to the witches’ religion than Zelda. She is nonetheless a very knowledgeable and powerful witch, easily holding her own against rival witches and demons alike.
