= Zelda Spellman =

Fictional character from Sabrina the Teenage Witch

- Sabrina the Teenage Witch character
- Zelda Spellman (bottom), Hilda Spellman (left), Sabrina Spellman (top), Melissa Joan Hart as Sabrina (upper right). From Sabrina the Teenage Witch (volume 2) #8, December 1997.
- First appearance: Archie's Mad House #65 (December 1968)
- Created by: Bob White
- Portrayed by: Charlene Fernetz (Sabrina the Teenage Witch); Beth Broderick (Sabrina the Teenage Witch); Miranda Otto (Chilling Adventures of Sabrina)
- Voiced by: Jane Webb (Filmation series); Beth Broderick (video game); Melissa Joan Hart (DIC series); Bettina Bush (Secret Life); Erin Mathews (Hub series)

In-universe information
- Alias: Zelda Phiona Spellman (full name)
- Nickname: Zeldy
- Gender: Female
- Occupation: Comics; Witch; TV; Teacher
- Spouses: Comics; Madam Satan (Lilith); TV; Benvolio (Divorced; married only for three days in the Middle Ages.)
- Relatives: Comics; Sabrina Spellman (niece); Hilda Spellman (sister); Ambrose (cousin); TV; Great-Granny (great-grandmother); Sucker Hyphen Baffoon (grandmother; deceased); Beulah Spellman (paternal aunt); Dorma Spellman (paternal aunt); Irma Spellman (maternal aunt); Marigold Wiccan (cousin); Mortimer (cousin); Doris (cousin); Zsa Zsa Goowhiggie (cousin); Monty (cousin); Stanislav (cousin); Father Christmas (cousin); Emperor Larry (cousin); Susie (cousin); Pele (cousin); Vesta Spellman (sister); Sophia Spellman (sister); Edward "Ted" Spellman (brother); Boyd, Racine and Maw Maw (country cousins)
- Nationality: American

Other Information
- Abilities: Magic; Occult knowledge
- Hair Color: Comics: Green; TV: Blonde
- Eye Color: Black

Zelda Phiona Spellman is a character featured in the Archie comic book Sabrina the Teenage Witch. Zelda is a full witch (as opposed to half or fully mortal) who lives in the fictional town of Greendale (in the 1990s live-action sitcom, Zelda lives in fictional Westbridge, Massachusetts). Zelda lives with her niece Sabrina Spellman, her sister Hilda Spellman, and the family cat Salem Saberhagen, a former witch turned into a cat as punishment for his attempt at world domination.

== History and character ==
Aunt Zelda first appeared in Archie's Mad House #65 (December 1968). In the original comics, Zelda was short and stout with green hair. Unlike her temperamental sister Hilda, Zelda's personality was helpful and good-natured.

Starting in the late 1990s, Zelda (and Hilda)'s appearances and personalities were revamped to make her more contemporary (as well as match the live-action sitcom's take on the character). In modern stories, Zelda has her trademark green hair, but appears to be only physically a few years older than Sabrina and dresses in modern fashions.

== In other media ==
=== Filmation animated series ===
Zelda's first non-comics appearance was on the 1969-70 Filmation animated series The Archie Comedy Hour. Zelda was similar to her then-current comics portrayal, with a typical "witch" appearance and attire, as well as her good-natured personality. Unlike Hilda, Zelda's voice was much more soft-spoken. Zelda was voiced by Jane Webb.

=== Sabrina the Teenage Witch (live-action sitcom) ===
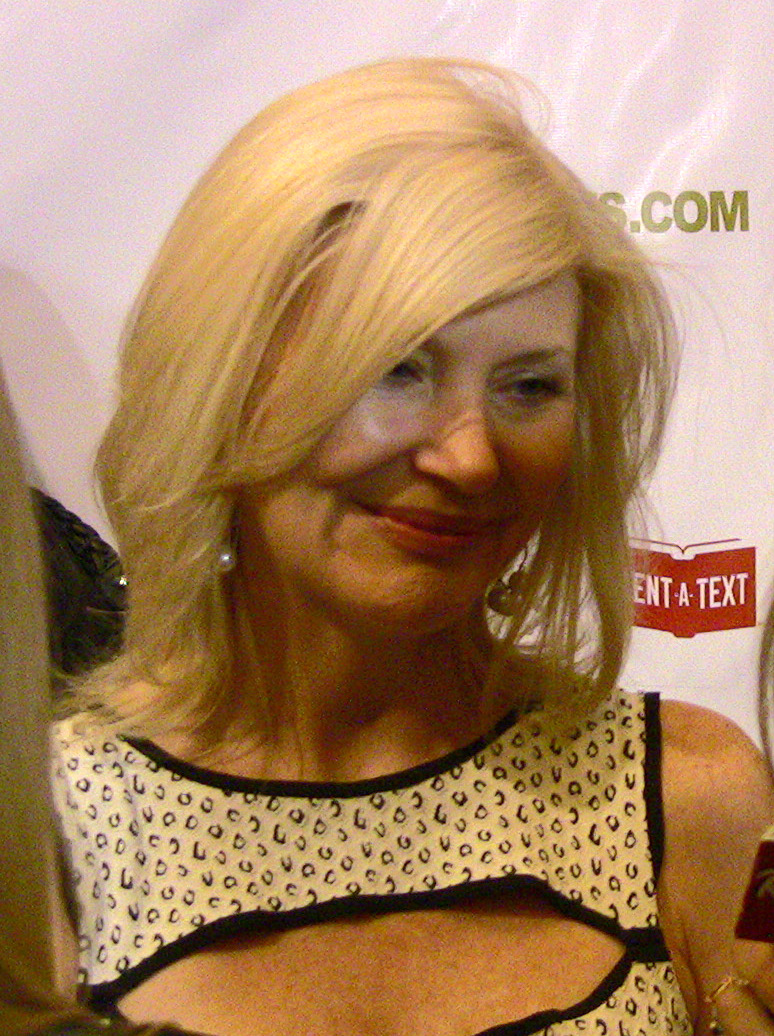
Beth Broderick plays Zelda on Sabrina the Teenage Witch.

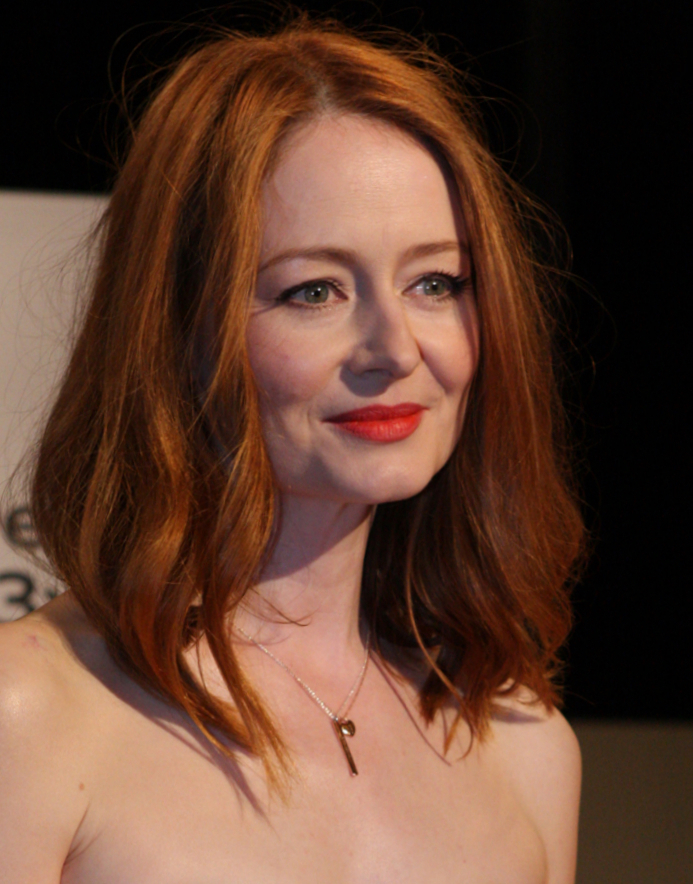
Miranda Otto plays Zelda on Chilling Adventures of Sabrina.

In the sitcom, Zelda was blonde and a down-to-earth scientist who tries to keep Sabrina and Hilda out of trouble. As a stark contrast to early comic portrayals, she plays a more prominent role than Hilda and insists that Sabrina only use her magic for good. As a witch, her magical abilities often manifested as a stream of violet magical particles (similar to Sabrina's golden red magical sparkles) whenever she would transfigure an object or being, conjure an object or teleport herself from one place to another. She is more of an authority figure and is often strict with Sabrina. She punishes Sabrina for her actions, but is more lenient than the Witches' Council would be. She also has a body in suspended animation, which is why she and Hilda never age. Sometimes she acts more like a minor antagonist in the series.

==== Childhood ====
Zelda P. Spellman was born in 1346. Zelda grew up during the 14th century in Europe, with at least five other siblings: Vesta, being the oldest; Edward, Hilda and Sophia, the youngest.

Vesta was terribly jealous of all the attention that Hilda and Zelda got when they were little. So, she turned her parents into pigs and wouldn't turn them back until her parents sent Hilda and Zelda away to be adopted.

While the children were living in the farm house the parents stayed in the barn. Their father was "getting very good at working an instamatic with his snout". When their mother head-butted Vesta about a month later, they were turned back into humans. In order to legally get Hilda and Zelda back, they had to adopt them.

Their overbearing mother, Grandma Lydia, spent 200 years of violin lessons on Hilda, while Zelda won trophies, "Winner of the Other Realm Science Fair", "Outstanding Student of the Decade" and "Best of the Best".

==== Adulthood ====
As Zelda reached adulthood, she went off to college. Zelda attended Other Realm University and subsequently went on to pursue three advanced degrees from Harvard University, graduating in 1873. When it became apparent that she would lose her job as associate professor unless she obtained a more recent degree, she completed a doctoral thesis in two weeks and earned a fourth PhD from Adams College.

Zelda, during the Renaissance, lived in Florence and met a man named Benvolio. Though her father disliked Benvolio, Zelda married Benvolio anyway, though their marriage only lasted three days. At some point, Zelda woke her Aunt Dorma up and was turned into a porch swing.

Both sisters bounced from one job to another over the centuries while trying to find what they wanted to do. Zelda worked as a coal miner when she lived in Wales, rating this as her worst job. During the early 19th century, Hilda and Zelda worked together at a saloon. They were run out of town, but fortunately found a way to maintain some financial security: junk. In the early 1990s, before Sabrina came to live with Hilda and Zelda, they had manservants, spent late nights on the town, weekends in Tuscany, took part in Formula One racing, and originally had a disco on the second floor of their house.

When Sabrina officially moved in with her aunts, Zelda took on the role of the disciplinarian - though she was always helpful with teaching Sabrina new spells. Zelda eventually acquired a "Labtop," which allowed her to work on various magical experiments throughout the series. She also struck up a romance with Sabrina's vice principal Willard Kraft - who had previously been seeing Hilda. As a result, Hilda initially was very nosy and meddled in their relationship. Zelda affectionately nicknamed Willard her "monkey" while he called her "Zuzu" in response. Their relationship lasted two years and ended as Sabrina was graduating.

Zelda was offered a job at Adams College where Sabrina had opted to attend. She taught a physics class although Sabrina never took it. During this time she became involved with Sabrina's English professor Arthur Carlon - leading to Sabrina fretting that this would unfairly affect her grades. They stayed together for roughly a year. During this time, Zelda became jealous of Hilda's relationship with the college president Wayne Banning (though not romantically).

Sabrina and Zelda attempted to break up Hilda and her new fiancée Will but then discovered that the two really were destined to be together - when they separated Hilda turned to stone and shattered. In order to save her, Sabrina gave up her own true love. When Sabrina turned to stone and shattered, she reformed a few minutes later. Zelda then revealed that she had given up her adult years in order to save Sabrina. She then moved out of the house so Sabrina's friends Roxie and Morgan could move in. She later appeared at Sabrina's wedding to Aaron though not in human form. In exchange for allowing Sabrina's mother to appear without being turned into a ball of wax, the Witches Council ordered an exchange. And Hilda volunteered Zelda, turning her into a candle for the duration of the wedding.

=== DIC animated series ===
Zelda appears as a character in both Sabrina: The Animated Series and Sabrina's Secret Life. Melissa Joan Hart provided her voice in the first series while in the second series she is voiced by Bettina Bush. Zelda appeared radically different from her comic book appearances; here, she's depicted with strawberry blonde hair. Zelda had the same basic personality as in the live-action sitcom. She is depicted as a teenager (instead of the usual middle-aged adult), despite being the same age as in other media (hundreds of years old). It is mentioned in passing that she and Hilda have temporally been changed into teenagers by head witch Enchantra as punishment for minor crimes, but the situation is never fully explained. In Sabrina, the Animated Series both attend high school and are not considered legal adults in the mortal world, which is why Sabrina's maternal great-uncle Quigley (an original character created for the series) lives with them. Unlike in live action series, In Uncle Quigley is the authority figure and head of the household. Sabrina's Secret Life (set two years later), Hilda and Zelda are out of school and able to run the household (and Uncle Quigley is no longer in the cast). They still act more like teenagers than adults.

=== Secrets of a Teenage Witch ===
Zelda appears in the animated series Sabrina: Secrets of a Teenage Witch, voiced by Erin Mathews. Here she and Hilda run a bakery, and again look after Sabrina. In this series Zelda looks more like her sister did in the early comics, but with blonde hair similar to Sabrina's. But she is not strict or an authority figure in the series.

=== Chilling Adventures of Sabrina series ===
Zelda (Zelda Fiona Spellman) is played by Miranda Otto in the Netflix series Chilling Adventures of Sabrina. Zelda is the more rigid of the two sisters, sometimes clashing with Hilda and Sabrina, however her filial affection overrules all other feelings.
