= Warlock =

Male sorcerer

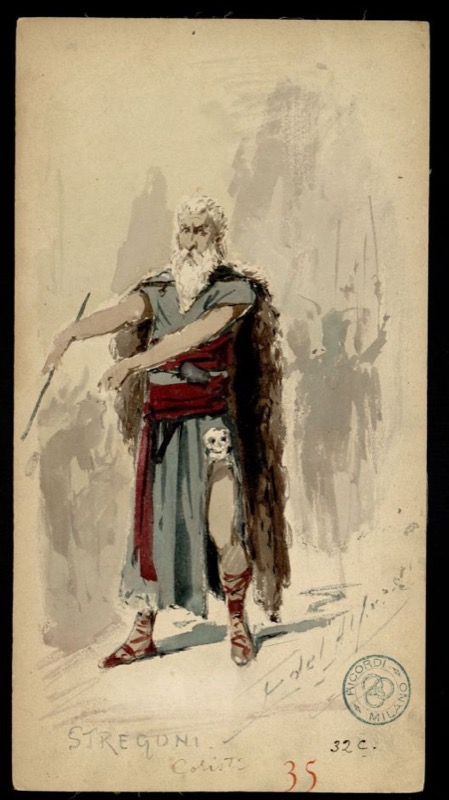
Costume design for a warlock for the opera Mefistofele (Alfredo Leonardo Edel, 1881)

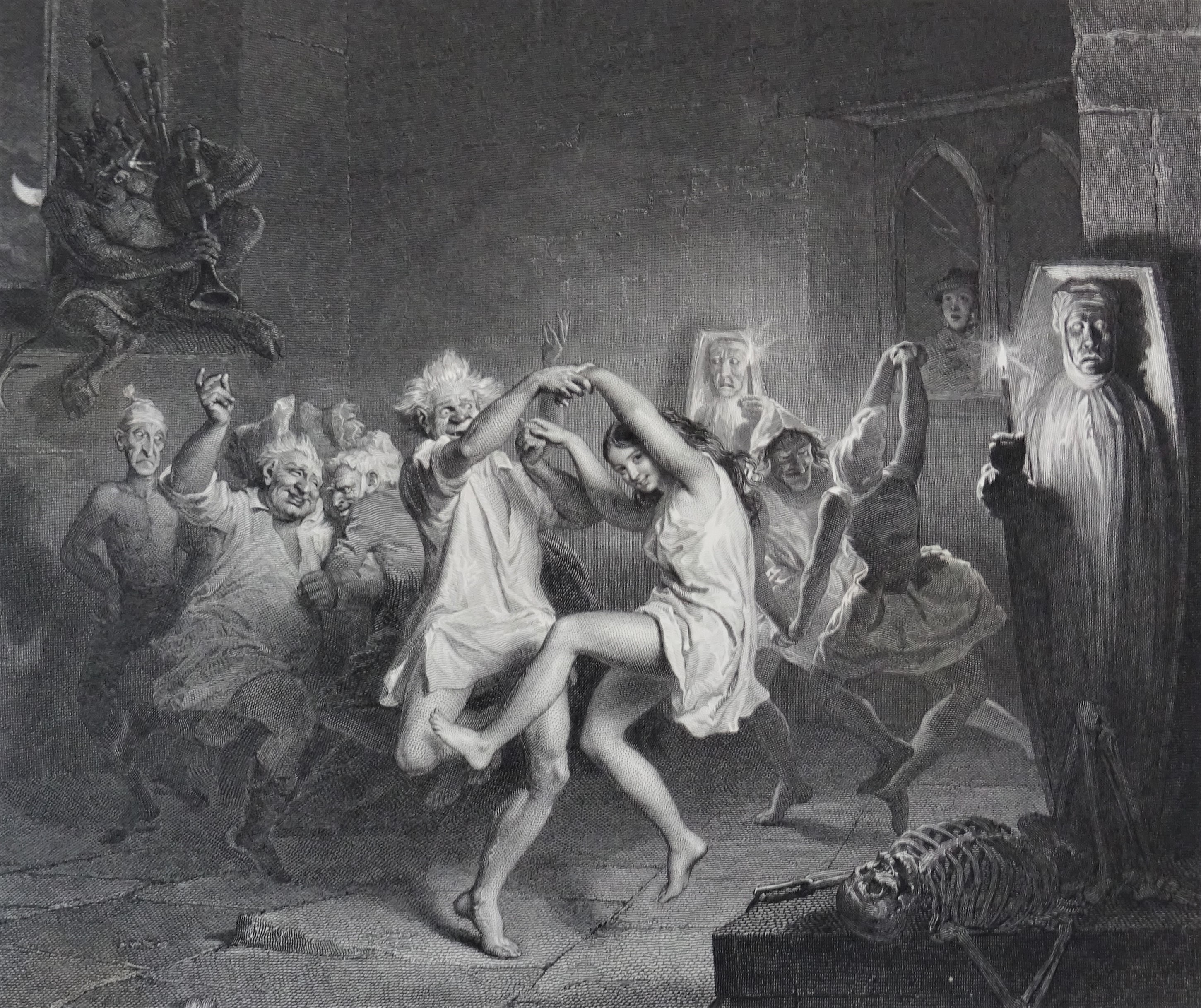
Warlocks and Witches in a dance (John Faed, 1855)

A warlock is traditionally a male practitioner of witchcraft or sorcery.

== Etymology and terminology ==
The most commonly accepted etymology derives warlock from the Old English wǣrloga, which meant "breaker of oaths" or "deceiver". The term came to apply specially to the devil around 1000 AD.

In early modern Scots, the word came to refer to the male equivalent of a "witch" (which can be male or female, but has historically been used predominantly for females). The term may have become associated in Scotland with male witches owing to the idea that they had made pacts with Auld Hornie (the devil) and thus had betrayed the Christian faith and broken their baptismal vows or oaths. From this use, the word passed into Romantic literature and ultimately into 20th-century popular culture.

A derivation from the Old Norse varð-lokkur, "caller of spirits", has also been suggested, but the Oxford English Dictionary considers this implausible owing to the extreme rarity of the Norse word and because forms without hard -k, which are consistent with the Old English etymology ("traitor"), are attested earlier than forms with a -k.

== History ==
Although most victims of the witch trials in early modern Scotland were women, some men were executed as warlocks.

In his day, the Scottish mathematician John Napier (1550–1617) was often perceived as a warlock or magician because of his interests in divination and the occult, though his establishment position likely kept him from being prosecuted.
