= George Gladir =

American writer

- George Gladir
- Born: September 27, 1925 New York City, New York, U.S.
- Died: April 3, 2013 (aged 87) Oceanside, California, U.S.
- Area: Writer
- Notable works: Archie Comics, Sabrina Spellman
- Awards: Bill Finger Award; Inkpot Award

George Gladir (September 27, 1925 – April 3, 2013) was an American comics writer. Primarily known as a scripter for Archie Comics, he co-created that publisher's character Sabrina Spellman, with artist Dan DeCarlo.

== Biography ==
George Gladir was born on September 23, 1925 in New York City, the son of Russian immigrants, and attended Stuyvesant High School in Manhattan. Serving in the U.S. Army during World War II, he became a German prisoner of war after having taken part in the invasion of Normandy. Afterward, he attended the School of Visual Arts in New York before reenlisting in the Army and becoming an intelligence officer serving in Germany during the Korean War.

He became a full-time comic book writer in 1959, doing one-page gag fillers for Archie Comics' Archie's Joke Book as well as for other titles. Writer and artist credits were not routinely given in comic books at that time. and Gladir's first confirmed credit is the gag page "Sign Language", drawn by Dan DeCarlo, in Archie's Girls Betty and Veronica #59 (Nov. 1960).

Gladir went on to write stories for several Archie Comics titles, including Archie's Pal Jughead, Reggie and Me, Betty and Me, and, primarily Archie's Girls Betty and Veronica. In Archie's Madhouse (the logo sometimes given as Archie's Mad House) #22 (Oct. 1962), the character Sabrina Spellman, by Gladir and DeCarlo, debuted in the humor anthology's lead story (the logo then spelled "Teen-Age"). She would eventually become one of the publisher's major characters, appearing in an animated series and a television sitcom. Gladir recalled in 2007,

I think we both envisioned it as a one-shot and were surprised when fans asked for more. We continued to do Sabrina stories off and on in Mad House until 1969 when we were flabbergasted to hear it was to become an animated [TV series]. When it came to naming Sabrina I decided to name her after a woman I recalled from my junior high school days ... who was very active in school affairs, and who assigned a number of us to interview prominent people in the media. In addition, the woman's name had a New England ring to it. Some years later I recalled the woman's name was not Sabrina, but actually Sabra Holbrook.

In the early 1960s, Gladir also began writing for the satiric magazine Cracked, eventually becoming its head writer; over the next 30 years, he wrote approximately 2,000 pages for the magazine, many of them illustrated by John Severin.

In the late 2000s, Gladir and Stan Goldberg created the one-shot comic book Cindy and Her Obasan for Rorschach Entertainment.

== Death ==
Gladir, who was living in Oceanside, California, died on April 3, 2013.

== Awards ==
At the 2007 Comic Con, Gladir received the Bill Finger Award for Excellence in Comic Book Writing. Writer and historian Mark Evanier, who chaired the committee said, Gladir "laid down important groundwork on which other writers could and did build, just like Bill Finger did."
