= List of Sabrina the Teenage Witch characters =

List of Sabrina the Teenage Witch characters may refer to:

- List of Sabrina the Teenage Witch (comics) characters
- List of Sabrina the Teenage Witch (1996 TV series) characters
- List of Sabrina the Teenage Witch (1970 TV series) characters
- List of Chilling Adventures of Sabrina (TV series) characters
