= Sabrina the Teenage Witch (film) =

1996 television film by Tibor Takács

- Promotional poster
- Based on: Sabrina the Teenage Witch by: Dan DeCarlo; George Gladir
- Screenplay by: Barney Cohen; Kathryn Wallack; Nicholas Factor
- Story by: Barney Cohen; Kathryn Wallack
- Directed by: Tibor Takács
- Starring: Melissa Joan Hart; Sherry Miller; Charlene Fernetz; Michelle Beaudoin; Ryan Reynolds; Tobias Mehler; Lalainia Lindbjerg
- Composer: Greg De Belles
- Country of origin: United States
- Original language: English

Production
- Executive producers: Barney Cohen; Kathryn Wallack; Paula Hart
- Cinematography: Bernard Salzmann
- Editor: Daria Ellerman
- Running time: 90 minutes
- Production companies: Barney Cohen and Kathryn Wallack Productions; Once and Future Films; Hartbreak Films; Viacom Productions; Showtime Networks

Original release
- Network: Showtime
- Release: April 7, 1996

Related
- Sabrina Goes to Rome

Sabrina the Teenage Witch is a 1996 American television film adaptation based on the comic book series of the same name from Archie Comics. It preceded the Sabrina the Teenage Witch television series and premiered on Showtime on April 7, 1996.

The only two actors who would appear in both the film and television series would be Melissa Joan Hart, whose character possessed a different surname (Sawyer) from her comic book and television counterpart (Spellman), and Michelle Beaudoin, who played Sabrina's best friend, named Marnie in the film and renamed Jenny for the television series. Also of note is the fact that, unlike the comics, which were set in the fictional town of Greendale, and the eventual television series (located in an equally fictional town named Westbridge), the television film was said to take place in Riverdale. This was the name originally used in the comics for the home of Archie and his group of friends. Although set in the United States, just like the comics and television series, the movie was shot entirely in British Columbia, Canada.

== Plot ==
The movie centers around Sabrina Sawyer, who is sent to live with her eccentric aunts in Riverdale. On her 16th birthday, Sabrina discovers that she is a witch. Sabrina then develops a crush on Seth, the cutest boy in school who happens to be dating Katie La More, the school's queen bee. Sabrina has to find a way to use her newly discovered magical power to get Seth to notice her, but at the same time not cast a love spell, which could backfire on her.

After Katie dumps Seth, he starts to notice Sabrina. Sabrina is able to use her magic to win a track competition and get Seth to ask her to the Spring Fling. Katie discovers Sabrina's secret and sets out to let everyone know what Sabrina is. Sabrina has to use her magic to turn Katie into a poodle to stop her but later changes her back. All the while, Harvey likes Sabrina and waits to see if she will have a change of heart and start to notice him. The story ends happily with Sabrina and Harvey together at the dance.

== Cast ==
- Melissa Joan Hart as Sabrina Sawyer
- Sherry Miller as Aunt Hilda
- Charlene Fernetz as Aunt Zelda
- Michelle Beaudoin as Marnie Littlefield
- Ryan Reynolds as Seth
- Tobias Mehler as Harvey
- Lalainia Lindbjerg as Katie La More
- Laura Harris as Freddie
- Kea Wong as Fran
- Jo Bates as Coach
- Janine Cox as Sales Clerk
- Biski Gugushe as Larry
- Tyler Labine as Mark
- Jim Swansburg as Mr. Dingle
- Noel Geer as Jeff
- Brian Steele as Salem Saberhagen (uncredited voice)

== See also ==
- List of films about witchcraft
