= Kiss Me Again =

Kiss Me Again may refer to:

== Film and TV ==
- Kiss Me Again (1925 film), directed by Ernst Lubitsch
- Kiss Me Again (1931 film), starring Bernice Claire, Edward Everett Horton and Walter Pidgeon
- Kiss Me Again (2006 film), starring Jeremy London
- Kiss Me Again (2010 film), directed and written by Gabriele Muccino
- Kiss Me Again (TV series), a 2018 Thai TV series

== Songs ==
- "Kiss Me Again", a song by Arthur Russell
- "Kiss Me Again", a song by We Are the In Crowd from Best Intentions, 2011
- "Kiss Me Again", a song by The Drums from Encyclopedia, 2014
- "Kiss Me Again", a song from the operetta Mlle. Modiste by Victor Herbert
- "Kiss Me Again", a song by Roy Bee, 2009
