= List of Sabrina the Teenage Witch (1996 TV series) characters =

The television series Sabrina the Teenage Witch has hosted a wide array of characters and guests over its series run. Sabrina and Salem are the only two characters to remain on the show throughout all consecutive seven seasons and all three made-for-TV movies.

== Cast ==
Actor	Character	Seasons							Sabrina Goes to Rome	Sabrina Down Under
Actor	Character	1	2	3	4	5	6	7	Sabrina Goes to Rome	Sabrina Down Under
Melissa Joan Hart	Sabrina Spellman	Main	Main	Main	Main	Main	Main	Main	Main	Main
Nick Bakay	Salem Saberhagen	Main	Main	Main	Main	Main	Main	Main	Main	Main
Caroline Rhea	Hilda Spellman	Main	Main	Main	Main	Main	Main	Guest		
Beth Broderick	Zelda Spellman	Main	Main	Main	Main	Main	Main			
Nate Richert	Harvey Kinkle	Main	Main	Main	Main	Recurring	Main	Main		
Jenna Leigh Green	Libby Chessler	Main	Main	Main						
Martin Mull	Willard Kraft		Main	Main	Main					
Soleil Moon Frye	Roxie King					Main	Main	Main		
Elisa Donovan	Morgan Cavanaugh					Main	Main	Main		
Lindsay Sloane	Valerie Birkhead		Main	Main						
David Lascher	Josh Blackhart				Main	Main	Main			
Trevor Lissauer	Miles Goodman					Main	Main			
Alimi Ballard	Albert the Quizmaster		Main							
Michelle Beaudoin	Jenny Kelley	Main								
Paul Feig	Mr. Pool	Main								
Mary Gross	Mrs. Quick		Main	Main	Main					
Tara Strong	Gwen								Main	Main
China Shavers	Dreama				Recurring					
Jon Huertas	Brad Alcerro				Recurring					
Bumper Robinson	James							Recurring		
John Ducey	Leonard							Recurring		
Diana-Maria Riva	Annie Martos							Recurring		
Dylan Neal	Aaron Jacobs							Recurring		
Andrew Walker	Cole Harper							Recurring		
Curtis Andersen	Gordie	Recurring	Recurring	Recurring						
Bridget Flanery	Jill	Recurring	Recurring							
Emily Hart	Amanda Wiccan	Guest	Guest	Guest	Guest	Guest	Guest	Guest		
George Wendt	Mike Shelby						Recurring			
Phil Fondacaro	Roland	Guest	Guest	Guest	Guest					
Melissa Murray-Mutch (as Melissa Murray)	Cee Cee (Teacher)	Recurring								
Penn Jillette	Drell	Recurring								
Elizabeth Hart	Emma	Recurring	Recurring							
Henry Gibson	Witch Judge/Judge Samuels	Guest	Guest	Guest						
Donald Faison	Dashel			Guest	Guest					
Barbara Eden	Aunt Irma						Guest	Guest		
Michael Trucco	Kevin					Recurring				
Tom McGowan	Principal Larue	Recurring								
Beth Grant	Mrs. Popowski / Mrs. Grant		Recurring	Recurring						
Cee Cee Michaela	Cee Cee (student)		Recurring							
Timothy Oman	Sigmund Freud/Freud		Guest	Guest			Guest			
Alley Mills	Diana Spellman						Guest	Guest		

== Main characters ==
=== Sabrina Spellman ===
Sabrina is depicted from the middle of high school through all the way to marriage. On her 16th birthday, she learned that she was a half-witch (through her father's side) and had magical powers. She also learned that her two aunts were witches themselves and that their black cat Salem was a witch who had been turned into a talking household pet as a punishment for attempting worldwide domination. At Westbridge High, she befriended Jenny Kelley (and later Valerie Birkhead in seasons 2 and 3) and had an on-again, off-again relationship with Harvey Kinkle. She also has to deal with her Vice Principal Kraft who dates her aunt Zelda and then in season 4 becomes principal and stops dating Zelda and then goes back on and again not due to car crashes. In the finale they finally stop dating due to Salem driving a car into him. In season 4, Harvey believes Sabrina is cheating on him. They get back together later in Season 4 and then break up again when Harvey discovers she's a witch. She also had to deal with the snobby and headstrong cheerleader Libby Chessler, who became Sabrina's rival for school activities as well as Harvey's affections. Sabrina also at some points transforms herself into Libby to gain popularity (Libby is the queen of the school) for her "dorky" activities. In later seasons, Sabrina was enrolled at the fictional Adams College in Boston. Her roommates are gloomy Roxie, fashion-glamour Morgan, and paranormal activist Miles, who, at one point almost got Sabrina exposed as a witch. After getting her degree in journalism she moved back to her aunts' house with Morgan and Roxie. She took a job with the fictitious ScorchMagazine, a music theme magazine where she interviewed famous artists. Later on, she met a man named Aaron, who also worked in the music industry and the two began dating. Before long, Aaron proposed and in the finale, the two were set to wed when unforeseen events take place. She started to suspect that Aaron was not the one and after Sabrina had tried to connect her soul stone with his, she was sure of it. While it mostly fit, it was not a perfect fit. She tried to ignore it, but followed her heart and canceled the marriage at the altar. When she ran out of the church, she found Harvey waiting for her outside on his motorcycle, holding his soul stone that Amanda, her cousin, had left him. After both Harvey and Sabrina's soul stones were tossed to the side and fit together perfectly, it proved that those two are destined to be together and they rode off together into the distance in true finale fashion at 12:36 on the dot, the same hour they first met. Sabrina's magic takes the form of yellow sparks.

=== Hilda Spellman ===
Hildegarde Antoinette "Hilda" Spellman (played by Sherry Miller in the 1996 movie, then Caroline Rhea in the series) is one of Sabrina's aunts, a 642-year-old European witch who is Zelda's younger sister both of whom moved at some point to America. She is often portrayed as the less pragmatic of the two aunts, and constantly worries about things that could be considered superficial. Hilda was also the more outgoing and fun-loving aunt. She was formerly engaged to Drell, head of the Witches Council (played by Penn Jillette), and they were set to marry, but Drell jilted Hilda, and their engagement was called off. She also dated Sabrina's vice principal, Mr. Kraft, until she begins to hate him (with Sabrina) and they desperately try to break him and Zelda apart when Zelda begins to date him. During the college seasons, she became the owner of the coffee shop where Sabrina and Josh worked, and where many of the show's scenes took place. At one point, Hilda tried to help Salem Saberhagen in his quest to conquer the mortal realm, but, when he was caught, convicted and transformed into a cat, Hilda was punished with the job of keeping him worm-free (a job Sabrina took on when Hilda left the series). However, she was pardoned in the final episode of season five, though she decided to keep custody of Salem anyway. It is also claimed by her sister that she caused the American Revolution. For the first three seasons, Hilda played a violin, but was clearly not very good at it as she failed at every audition: In one episode, the violin came flying through the patio doors, and the bow went right through it like an arrow through a heart. At the start of Season 4, Hilda gave up on her violin, and blew it up with a stick of dynamite. She bought a clock shop which had a magical Lost in Time clock in the back room; whenever famous people in the past centuries made a mistake at some point in their lives, they would become lost in time, and Hilda and Zelda had to try to figure out what went wrong. By the start of Season 5, though, the clock shop was out of business, and Hilda bought the coffee shop much to Sabrina's annoyance as she had just moved out of her aunt's house, and was now living with Roxie, Morgan, and Miles. Hilda often made a great fuss over the silliest things: For example, in one episode, Hilda ran for office after a politician publicly stated that her coffee was too expensive. She lost the election without a single vote (the one vote she did receive was disqualified because it was signed with a pawprint rather than a signature, indicating that Salem was the voter in question). As Sabrina's time in college came to an end, Hilda met her soul mate, a train conductor on the Halloween Express, and impulsively married him. However, it almost did not happen after Zelda and Sabrina meddled for what they thought were the right reasons. Hilda later came back in Season 7 to attend Sabrina's wedding. Hilda's magic takes the form of puffs of white smoke.

=== Zelda Spellman ===
Zelda Spellman (played in the 1996 movie by Charlene Fernetz, then Beth Broderick in the series) is Sabrina's brainy aunt who is always engaging in new scientific experiments. She is often referred to as a quantum physicist. Zelda is a 659-year-old European witch who at some point moved along with her sister to America. She sometimes teaches at Westbridge High, and (in later seasons) Adams College. In one episode she says she has been accredited with discovering 17 moons. Zelda often plays the role of the mature, logical one, to bring Sabrina and sometimes Hilda back to earth after they attempt some zany scheme or otherwise get into trouble. Towards the end of Sabrina's time in college, Zelda gave up her adult years to bring a broken Sabrina back to life. As a child again, Zelda left Sabrina to run her own life, upon Sabrina's request. Young Zelda in the first episode of season 7 was played by Alexandra Hart-Gilliams (who played Ally in season 3). Zelda came back with Hilda, during Sabrina's wedding in Season 7, only this time as a candle. Zelda was volunteered by Hilda to become a candle for the duration of Sabrina's wedding so that Sabrina's mother could attend the wedding and not become a ball of wax, per her Witches' Council curse. Zelda is more strict than Hilda. Her magic takes the form of purple sparks.

=== Harvey Kinkle ===
Harvey Kinkle (played in the 1996 movie by Tobias Mehler, then Nate Richert in the series) is a mortal boy whose full name is Harvey Dwight Kinkle. As revealed in episode 62 (season 3), he has some Slavic ancestry. He was close friends with Sabrina, Salem, Roxie, Morgan, Jenny, Valerie and Brad Alcerro. Harvey is portrayed as a very popular and athletic young man, though not very bright. He is second string on the football team, and the object of affection of Libby Chessler, fueling Sabrina's rivalry with her. The character was first introduced in the comics in Archie's TV Laugh-Out #1 (December 1969).

Harvey was Sabrina's boyfriend until the 4th season, when he discovered that she was a witch in the season finale. The reason for this was that Sabrina had cast too many spells on him over the years and, when the limit was reached, his memory was no longer erased after each spell was reversed. After this, Harvey left the show.

Harvey made a few brief appearances during Season Five. In "Do You See What I See?", Harvey called Sabrina and apologized for the way he acted after learning she was a witch. Harvey returned to the show full-time in Season Six. Sabrina's Great Aunt Irma (played by Barbara Eden) later discovered Harvey knew Sabrina was a witch, and put him on trial to make sure he was trustworthy. Harvey was first attached to a lie detector which was not even plugged in, strapped to a spit and cooked, and even put on the torture rack, but he finally convinced Irma that Sabrina's secret was safe with him, and she let him go.

Harvey became Morgan's boyfriend for a time, but had developed feelings for Sabrina again, even coming to her rescue a couple of times. In season 7, it is revealed that Harvey is still in love with her. He makes Aaron jealous since he is Sabrina's ex and they are still close. In "Spellmanian Slip", Harvey still has a special place in Sabrina's heart (with a room of his own). In "A Fish Tale", Harvey has also shown himself to be unselfish; when Aunt Irma turned Aaron into a goldfish, Sabrina tried unsuccessfully to reverse the spell, so she gave up her magic; Harvey harnessed Sabrina's magic, and changed Aaron back. When Sabrina talked to Aunt Irma, she found out that Harvey was able to undo her spell because he wanted to make Sabrina happy (which, in Irma's opinion was a more powerful motivation than Sabrina's, which was to undo Irma's spell). Sabrina went to Harvey's apartment, only to find him gone; she found only a cardboard box with the vase that contained Sabrina's magic, a picture of them together, and a good luck note.

In the series finale, Sabrina realized that she and Harvey were soul mates, and she abandoned her wedding and rode off with him, her first and true love.

=== Salem Saberhagen ===
Salem Saberhagen (voiced by Nick Bakay) is a 500-year-old warlock who was a criminal of the Other Realm and was sentenced to spend 100 years as a cat as punishment for attempting to take over the world. He was sent to live with Hilda who was punished with keeping Salem worm-free. Despite his megalomaniacal desires for world domination (which he attempts periodically throughout the series), he is generally portrayed as having a good heart and being a loyal friend to Sabrina. In the series he would generally serve two roles: one as a mentor for Sabrina, as she found it easier to go to him with her messier problems, or the trouble-maker, such as finding another illicit way to become human without being punished or convincing Sabrina to use magic to solve her problems, both of which generally ended up putting Sabrina in even more trouble. When Sabrina's aunts left for the Other Realm, Salem stayed with Sabrina, and continued his attempts to become human. Salem became good pals with Harvey after he returned to the series, and would generally attempt to abuse this friendship to get some more power to take over the world. Salem also went on vacations with Sabrina in the made-for-television movies.

Salem has a grown-up daughter named Annabelle.

Salem was seen in human form a couple of times in flashbacks (as a teenager and adult), but his face was always obstructed from view, although Nick Bakay did make a cameo appearance in "A Girl And Her Cat" as a man who tries to kiss Zelda when Sabrina and her aunts were knocking on doors, looking for Salem.

50 more years were added to Salem's sentence at the end of the episode Salem, the Boy in Season 3.

At the end of the series 32 years of his imprisonment are over, meaning he has 68 more years until his punishment is terminated (if he behaves, of course).

In "Spellmanian Slip", he states that he wishes that Sabrina would marry Harvey.

=== Jenny Kelley ===
Jenny is a mortal character, Sabrina's best friend in the first season until Michelle Beaudoin left the show. Her disappearance is never mentioned or explained. Jenny had a powerful social conscience, was a vegetarian, and a very honest and loyal friend. She always dreamed of other worlds behind closets. Her dream came true when she accidentally entered the linen closet and met Drell. Drell turned her into a grasshopper, but she was saved by Sabrina and her aunts by making Jenny believe everything was a dream. Jenny was very imaginative and whimsical.

=== Libby Chessler ===
Played by Jenna Leigh Green, Libby is a snobby, rich, and spoiled cheerleader who delighted in tormenting Sabrina and her friends. She often referred to Sabrina as a "freak", and, while ignorant of the fact that Sabrina was a witch, she suspected that Sabrina was different. Libby is the mean girl of the series. Libby's major conflict with Sabrina revolved around the girls' competition for the affection of Harvey Kinkle, who clearly preferred Sabrina. Only a few personal details are known about Libby. She was once dubbed "pure evil" but simply took this as a compliment. She apparently comes from extreme wealth, and lives in a step-family arrangement of some sort. Her mother appeared in the episode "Five Easy Pieces of Libby" and is played by Cristine Rose; the mother is much like the daughter—snobby and mean-spirited. She has a stepbrother, Russell, who is seen in the episode "Sabrina Claus", and is played by Richard Taylor Olson; he and Libby have a combative relationship. In one episode, Sabrina accidentally turned her into a puzzle, so Sabrina had to learn more about her. She found out that Libby is bad in math, she takes after her mother in that she is rude and snobby, and that her grandma is very close to her heart. Her appearances generally involve her being mean to Sabrina and others, and getting poetic justice at the end of the episode. At the start of season 4, Libby was sent off to boarding school and was never seen again.

=== Valerie Birkhead ===
Valerie is Sabrina Spellman and Harvey Kinkle's mortal best friend at Westbridge High School. She is also despised by headstrong cheerleader Libby, who rivals both her and Sabrina for much of the show. Valerie remains Sabrina's best friend until she moves to Anchorage, Alaska, in 1999. She is a shy and often awkward girl who looks up to Sabrina despite being quite bright herself. Valerie often expresses her wish to be in the "cool crowd" even trying her hand, and winning a spot on the second string cheerleading squad in season 3, much to the worry of Sabrina who feared Valerie would transform into a mean, spiteful person like Libby. At the start of Season 4, she moved to Alaska with her family. She had agreed to move in with Sabrina to attend their senior year together, but then she decided to stay in Alaska instead. She was played by American actress Lindsay Sloane.

=== Mr. Willard Kraft ===
"Mr. Kraft", as he is often addressed on the show, is portrayed by Martin Mull. He is an administrator at Westbridge High School and regularly issues detentions at the drop of a hat (sometimes literally). He also expresses a personal dislike for Sabrina, Harvey, and Valerie (particularly Sabrina), and occasionally gives them detentions simply because he does not like them. He started out as Vice Principal in the second and third seasons before becoming principal in Season 4. He is known to have one brother and one sister. Mr. Kraft dated both Hilda and Zelda during the show, causing complications for Sabrina. Mr. Kraft is a mortal, but in one of the episodes where Sabrina and Hilda try to separate Zelda and Mr. Kraft, they find out that he was once married to a witch (named Lucy, played by actress Julia Duffy) who tried using her magic to trick Mr. Kraft as revenge for leaving her. At the end of season 4, Zelda breaks up with Mr. Kraft, who is then hit by a car, thanks to joyriding Hilda, and again by a joyriding Salem, and is never seen again.

=== Dreama ===
Dreama is a young girl who has Sabrina Spellman as a quiz master. Dreama is learning how to use her magic in the episodes of season 4. She is quite clumsy in the beginning. She gets turned into a mouse in one episode by Brad, but she is turned back when Brad's witch hunting gene is removed. Sabrina helps her learn and control her powers.

=== Josh Blackhart ===
Josh is a mortal guy that runs the coffee shop and gave Sabrina the job. Technically, Josh is her manager, although the relationship is somewhat different because Sabrina's aunt Hilda later owns the shop. Josh is interested in photography, and manages to sell one of his photographs for $1,000 (with Sabrina's magical help). He was attracted to Sabrina in the fourth season, but at that time she was dating Harvey, whom he acted jealously towards. In the fifth season he dated Morgan, and then in the sixth season he dated Sabrina. In this season Sabrina is willing to tell Josh she is a witch, so that she can tell him she loves him, but in the end she does not have to and he never figures it out. In the Season 6 finale, Sabrina gambles her love life in order to bring her Aunt Hilda back to life because of this Josh took the offer in Prague, and he was never seen again. Sabrina later discovers she is meant to be with Harvey. He was played by David Lascher.

=== Roxie King ===
Roxie, a mortal, was introduced to the show in Season 5 as Sabrina's college roommate. At first she dislikes Sabrina, but they later became best friends. Roxie is environmentally conscious and sometimes staged protests. She is a cynical character who puts up the front that she despises the thought that her housemate Miles has romantic interests in her. However, in "You Can't Twin", she has a dream about Miles and many episodes hint a romantic future for the two of them. In a Valentine's Day episode, Sabrina casts a spell on Roxie to make her see the good points of Miles, bringing out an exaggeration of her possible true feelings for him. In Season 7, Roxie became one of the leading characters in the absence of Sabrina's aunts. She was played by Soleil Moon Frye.

=== Morgan Cavanaugh ===
Morgan, a mortal, was introduced in season five as one of Sabrina's college housemates and resident adviser. When she was first introduced, she spoke with a normal tone (much how Elisa Donovan, the actress who played Morgan, speaks) but as the series progressed she developed, and spoke in, a more high-pitched tone. She is very shallow, superficial and over-assertive, but she became one of Sabrina's best friends. She dated both Josh and Harvey (among many others). In a Christmas episode, Morgan invites Sabrina to spend the holidays with her family, since she finds dealing with them alone quite daunting. In the seventh season, Morgan's supporting role becomes a leading one in the absence of Sabrina's aunts.

=== Miles Goodman ===
Miles is a mortal character that was introduced in the fifth season as one of Sabrina's college housemates. His behavior was endearingly abnormal and he was a conspiracy theorist, something his family did not exactly approve of. Miles had romantic interests in Roxie, but she did not outwardly reciprocate. However, in a Valentine's Day storyline, Sabrina cast a spell on Roxie to soften her feelings towards an initially frightened Miles. In another episode it was revealed that he is a huge fan of Adrienne Barbeau. It is hinted in many episodes that Miles and Roxie become a couple in the future, even to the stage of marrying and having children. In the episode "I Fall To Pieces", Miles finally began to notice the unusual behavior of Sabrina's witch-turned-cat Salem. Unfortunately, Miles was never seen again and his disappearance was never explained (on-screen) although in one of the season 7 episodes the reporter on the TV can be heard saying "Goodman was shot today" possibly implying he has died. Miles was played by Trevor Lissauer.

=== Aaron Jacobs ===
Aaron is Sabrina's last mortal boyfriend, who appears in the seventh season. She meets Aaron at the Scorch magazine office. They become engaged but Sabrina's aunt Irma turns him into a goldfish but Aaron is turned back when Harvey (who is in love with Sabrina) uses Sabrina's magic because he wants to make Sabrina happy. In the series finale, Sabrina prepares for her wedding but stops it when she realizes Aaron is not her soulmate and she runs off with Harvey, her soulmate and first true love (they are soulmates because when their soul stones drop to the ground they fit perfectly) at 12:36, the time they first met seven years ago. and whom Sabrina chose to be her groom. He gets jealous of Harvey since he is still close with Sabrina. Aaron was played by Dylan Neal.

=== Brad Alcerro ===
Brad was Harvey's best friend from Texas. He was not very nice to Sabrina. Sabrina later learned that Brad had a rare witch-hunting gene that made those who have it want to ferret out witches, which explained why he did not like Sabrina; because he sensed the magic in her (although he didn't know that) and it made him suspicious. Should a witch reveal herself to a witch-hunter, she is condemned to spend the next century as a mouse. Unfortunately, Dreama just happened to do this, and she became a mouse. The only way to restore her without waiting 100 years was to remove Brad's witch-hunting gene (which was literally a tiny pair of blue jeans) within 1 hour before the mouse form becomes permanent. With the witch-hunting gene gone, Brad's relationship with Sabrina became slightly friendlier, and Sabrina can use magic on him without ever risking exposure or becoming a mouse. Brad's departure was never explained. Brad was played by Jon Huertas.

=== Mr. Eugene Pool ===
Mr. Pool is mortal. He is Sabrina's favorite teacher who teaches Biology until Paul Feig left the show after season 1. He was sometimes bitter and sarcastic, but always interesting and usually lively. In one episode, Sabrina casts a spell that endows him with the knowledge of changing lead to gold, but is later forced to retract the knowledge due difficulties it would have caused. Mr. Pool, who had benefited greatly from the knowledge, was very unhappy when he lost it. In the episode "As Westbridge Turns", he reveals that Sabrina is one of his best students. In that same episode, he also plans to marry the school nurse, who ends up running away with the new janitor. Mr. Pool's response to that situation was a calm, "Meh. I got farther than I thought I would."

=== Albert the Quizmaster ===
Albert is Sabrina's quizmaster in season 2 with the job of teaching her how to use magic rightfully so that she can receive her witches' license after a year of witch training. Though Sabrina likes to work with him, she often finds him annoying. In spite of disliking him a little, she found that she couldn't have any Quizmaster but Albert teach her. The Quizmaster taught Sabrina how to turn herself into fire, water and wind, which is said to be very hard for a witch to do.

Throughout the year, he was only known as Quizmaster; however, his name is revealed on "Quiz Show" episode of season 2. It turns out to be "Albert", but they decide to stick with Quizmaster instead. The actor who played him (Alimi Ballard) left the show after the second season, as Sabrina receives her witches' license, giving the character no further role in the series. He had a strange but colorful clothing style and was afraid of clowns.

=== Gwen ===
Gwen is British witch, played by Tara Strong (credited with her maiden name Charendoff), who only appears in the movies Sabrina Goes to Rome and Sabrina, Down Under, as Sabrina's friend during her travels. Like Dreama, she has a hard time controlling her magic and her spells never work the way she expects them to; while Sabrina casts spells with her index finger, Gwen casts spells by clenching her fist. She is shown to have a liking for jellybeans. In the first film, she aided Sabrina in solving the mystery of her family locket, while also facing her own dilemma after she accidentally turned her crush, Alberto, into a pigeon; in order to reverse the spell, she went around randomly kissing pigeons (the only way to reverse the spell) and eventually succeeded. In the second film, she goes on holiday with Sabrina in the Australian Great Barrier Reef, where she helps Sabrina to prevent the destruction of a mermaid colony at the hands of water pollution and a greedy marine biologist. By the time of the second film, she has gained more control over her powers through practice, but has yet to completely perfect them; upon reuniting with Sabrina, she demonstrates this by transforming Sabrina's shell necklace into a flower lei, but unintentionally gave her a rabbit's tail in the process; in response to this, Gwen explains, "In my defense, I didn't say I was good; just said I was better."

== Relatives ==
Throughout the series, Sabrina met members of her family who were also witches. Throughout Season Three, relatives would come to the Spellman house for a visit, and at the end of their visit, they would give Sabrina a clue to the family secret. Sabrina did not solve it until the Season Three finale: "Every member of the Spellman family is born with a twin". Here are some of Sabrina's relatives.

- (2nd) Cousin Amanda Wiccan: Amanda (played by Melissa Joan Hart's real life sister Emily Hart) appeared several times throughout the series. She appears in every season.

She is mischievous and typically causes trouble with her magic. In her first appearance, she is shown to have the habit of shrinking people she does not like into jars. In another appearance, she turns Sabrina into a doll before being outsmarted and changed into a doll herself. In another appearance, she develops a crush on Harvey, before being shown that she does not want to grow up. In another appearance, she was visited by Sabrina in Witchright Hall, a school for maladjusted young witches. This episode was a pilot for a spin-off featuring Amanda, although the series was not picked up. Amanda's character slowly grew into a slightly more caring and respectable person, often helping Sabrina when possible. Such was the case when she appeared in the series finale "Soul Mates", where she gives Harvey his soul stone, which matches Sabrina's. Amanda eventually became taller than Sabrina. Amanda is actually Sabrina's second cousin as her mother, Marigold Wiccan Nee Spellman, is Hilda and Zelda's first cousin.

- (2nd) Cousin Ally Wiccan: Ally (played by Melissa Joan Hart's real life half-sister Alexandra Hart-Gilliams) is Amanda's little sister. She appeared in the season 3 episode The Matchmaker.
- Grandma Lydia Spellman: Lydia (played by Shirley Jones of The Partridge Family fame) appeared in only one episode ("Little Orphan Hilda" in Season 4). She is shrill and overbearing and is the mother of Vesta, Zelda, Hilda, Ted and Sophia. When Zelda and Hilda were little, the envious Vesta turned Lydia and her husband into pigs due to the attention that Hilda and Zelda had. Lydia spent 200 years of violin lessons on Hilda, and literally exploded when she learned Hilda had given up her violin to buy her clock shop.
- Cousin Zsa Zsa Goowhiggie: Zsa Zsa (played by Sheryl Lee Ralph) appeared in only one episode ("What Price Harvey?" in Season Three). She was a notorious prankster who sold a line of "Ambition" products. Salem pinched some concealer from her make-up bag to try to hide some bags under his eyes, but he used too much, and made himself invisible, and she also gave Hilda and Zelda some Walk-a-Mile moccasins which switched their personalities. Sabrina sought Zsa Zsa's help when Harvey told her he was not going to college, so she sold her the whole line of Ambition products. Unfortunately, they turned Harvey into a ruthless businessman. Zsa Zsa was forced to import some perspective which came in the form of an eyeball which Sabrina used to make Harvey normal again. At the end of her visit, Zsa Zsa gave Sabrina her clue to the family secret: a snake.
- Great Aunt Dorma: Dorma (Voiced by Rosalind Ayres) is (quite literally) the black sheep of the Spellman family. She appeared in "The Big Sleep". She sleeps for ten years at a time, and to wake her would be a huge mistake. When Sabrina woke her up to ask her about the family secret, Dorma took her revenge by sending Other Realm poppies to the Spellman house which put both Hilda and Zelda to sleep, but they had a different effect on Sabrina as she was half-mortal; they only made her drowsy. Sabrina eventually dealt with the poppies by causing it to snow in her house (just like in The Wizard of Oz). Aunt Dorma appeared at the end of the episode (as an actual black sheep) to apologize, and she thanked Sabrina for waking her up as she had left her oven on, then gave her a clue to family secret; she conjured up several birds (quite possibly the aviary clue). She is one of Lydia's sisters.
- Cousin Pele: Pele (portrayed by Kellye Nakahara) is a Hawaiian goddess of fire who appeared in the last episode of Season Three. She gave Sabrina the final clue to the family secret: a ball of twine. When she first meets Sabrina, she also introduces herself as Sabrina's cousin. She also gives Sabrina her official witches license at the end of the episode.
- Uncle Nicholas: Santa Claus is revealed to be a Spellman in Season Three (in episode 61, "Christmas Amnesia"). In an episode in one of the earlier seasons, however, it is said that Santa Claus's name is Bob. It was also hint at the end of the episode, Uncle Nicholas was also the father of the holiday Bobunk (a holiday Salem erased in his younger years). His clue to the family secret was a picture of Robert E. Lee.
- Aunt Vesta Spellman: Sabrina's Aunt Vesta (played by Raquel Welch) appeared in the season one episode "Third Aunt From the Sun". She lives in the Pleasure Dome in the Other Realm. She appeared disguised as a substitute teacher after she gave Mr. Pool a twenty-four-hour bug—which turns out to be a real giant bug that terrorizes Mr. Pool. After class, she introduced herself to Sabrina, and took her on a shopping spree. In Paris, Vesta told Sabrina that while Hilda and Zelda enjoyed living on Earth, she herself could not stand mortals for too long. She is later mentioned in the second-season finale as taking her mother shopping, bringing Hilda and Zelda to the conclusion that Vesta was their mother's favorite daughter.
- Great Aunt Irma: Irma (played by Barbara Eden) is the matriarch of the Spellman family, and, as Zelda described her, "Dreaded holy terror of the Other Realm". She first appeared in A Birthday Witch in Season Six where she tried Harvey to be sure he could keep the fact that Sabrina was a witch to himself. Harvey passed Irma's test, and she let him go, but she turned Hilda, Zelda and Salem into three pigs after Hilda called her "prune face" (it was easy to tell which pig Salem was as one of the pigs was all black). Sabrina bravely stood up to Aunt Irma (which nobody else has ever done), and Irma removed her spell; when Sabrina confronted her, she mentioned that she was busy frying her brother-in-law. When her daughter Phyllis told a mortal that she was a witch, Irma trapped her daughter in a snow globe. She appeared in two more episodes (Season Six's The Arrangement and Season Seven's A Fish Tale). The casting of Barbara Eden is a reference to her role of Jeannie in I Dream of Jeannie. In the show The IT Crowd, the character Jen's period is referred to as "Aunt Irma visiting." In the later years, when the Witches Council were modernized, she decided to become the leader of the new Council (which nobody dared to say no, plus her befitting status as one of Other Realm's most powerful witches). Now, her occupation is the Head of the Witches Council, Ruler of the Other Realm and Queen of All Witches.
- Cousin Susie: Susie "She's your no-good Uncle Floyd's illegitimate daughter" – Hilda Spellman. Susie's appearance made Sabrina uncomfortable because she had green skin and warts, making looks like The Wicked Witch of the West. To teach Sabrina a lesson about caring about looks, she cast a spell on Harvey which turned him into a furry beast. However, once Sabrina had learned her lesson, the spell was lifted, and Susie gave Sabrina her clue to the family secret; a whip. She gave Sabrina another clue, telling her "We all have good and bad parts", possibly referring to the answer to the family secret. Despite her hideous appearance, she has a good heart, at times taking time to heal the sick or feed homeless witches. It is mentioned by Hilda that she is illegitimate. She was played by Sonje Fortag.
- Cousin Marigold Wiccan: Marigold is the mother of Amanda and Ally and the first cousin of Hilda and Zelda. She first appeared in Season One's A Halloween Story in which Salem learns from M'lady, Marigold's cat that Marigold is divorcing her husband, Harold. She later appeared in Season Three's Sabrina the Matchmaker where a romantic dinner, with a mortal plumber named Emil was ruined by her two daughters, Amanda and Ally. Marigold ended up revealing to Emil that she was a witch. Emil ran off, but later returned and kissed Marigold. Because she had revealed she was a witch to a mortal, Marigold lost her powers, but she told Sabrina that she had never been happy in all the years that she had had magic. She also gave Sabrina another clue to the family secret; a heart shaped card with rough edges. In her two appearances, Marigold was played by two different actresses (first by Robin Riker and by Hallie Todd in the second).
- Cousin Mortimer: Mortimer (played by Dom DeLuise) was a witch and professional magician who appeared in Season Three's The Pom Pom Incident. When Valerie decided to try to become a cheerleader, Sabrina, fearing she may end up being as mean as Libby, sought Mortimer's help, and he gave her a coin that she had to just slip into Valerie's ear. It put Valerie off the idea, but not for long as she still expressed her wish to be a cheerleader, but, this time, Sabrina used her magic to convince Libby to give Valerie a second chance. Meanwhile, Mortimer put on a magic show for Harvey's little brother for his birthday, and, unfortunately, ended up sending him to Calcutta, India. Luckily, he managed to bring him back. At the end of his visit, Mortimer revealed he had hidden a clue to the family secret somewhere in the house. Sabrina found the clue under a cushion; a picture of a man in a Superman-type outfit with ABC on his chest (meaning "Spellman"). It was later suggested, by Aunt Hilda, that she and Mortimer were originally scheduled to sit next to each other at Sabrina's wedding, much to Hilda's dismay. Mortimer was never seen on-screen during this episode.
- Kong: Kong was the second to last relative to give Sabrina a clue to the family secret. Kong made a hand-only appearance at the end of Silent Movie. He had a blond woman (who was supposed to be Fay Wray) sitting on his palm. Hilda told Sabrina that Kong is a third cousin with a pituitary problem. Sabrina put the Fay Wray clue with a picture of herself and a picture of Robert E. Lee, and she then knew that the family secret was about the Spellman family.
- Edward "Ted" Spellman: Ted is Sabrina's father. He and Sabrina's mother divorced when Sabrina was ten years old, and he later gained a new girlfriend named Gail Kipling. Ted was played by Robby Benson when he appeared in the pilot episode and Meeting Dad's Girlfriend (Season 1 episodes), but was played by Doug Sheehan of Knots Landing fame in his later appearances (Season Four's No Place Like Home and the series finale where he arrives to walk Sabrina down the aisle). A few times in Meeting Dad's Girlfriend, Ted speaks in a loud, booming voice, possibly a reference to Disney's Beauty and the Beast in which Robby Benson provided the voice for Beast.
- Diana: Diana is Sabrina's mother. After the divorce, she became an archaeologist in Peru. Diana is mortal, and therefore has no magic. Also, she is unable to be with her daughter because of a term set by the Witch's Council; if they lay eyes on each other, Diana will turn into a ball of wax. Diana appeared four times in the series; she first appeared (briefly) in "Meeting Dad's Girlfriend" when Sabrina used the Sneak-a-Peek magnifying glass, but the identity of the actress playing her is unknown as it was an aerial shot, although some have speculated that it is Melissa Joan Hart's mother, Paula. In her second appearance (in Season Two's "Mom vs Magic"), Diana actually got to see her daughter after Sabrina was forced to choose between her mother and her magic after she sent her a letter (she later discovered that this was a test), and the two had a heart-to-heart when Sabrina was not sure whom to choose between Harvey and Dashell (she was played by Pam Blair). In her next appearance (in Season Six's "The Whole Ball of Wax"), Diana was turned into a ball of wax, and though Sabrina was able to bring her back, she was told by her aunts that if her mother turned into a ball of wax again, nothing would bring her back. Diana did manage to attend Sabrina's wedding in the series finale, but at a price as Zelda was temporarily turned into a candle (in her last two appearances, Diana was played by Alley Mills).
- Gail Kipling: Gail is a witch, lawyer and Ted's girlfriend introduced in the First Season's episode "Meeting Dad's Girlfriend", when she quarreled with Ted over Sabrina questioning whether they would get married or not. Over the course of the next two years their relationship further developed upon the point of getting married, thus Gail became Sabrina's step-mother. Sabrina temporarily moves in with her and Ted when her life on Westbridge takes a stumble in "There's No Place Like Home", when it's revealed that she has a son called Donald and is fluent in French. She has a strange blood type, just like Ted.
- Donald Kipling: Gail's son and Ted's step-son who is never actually seen but is mentioned by Gail in "There's No Place Like Home". Donald's magic is shown to be a cyan, circling beam of light.
- Great Aunt Beulah: Beulah (played by Jo Anne Worley) is Sabrina's great aunt. She appeared in Season Three's "Good Will Haunting". She sent Hilda and Zelda invitations to her Halloween party over the centuries, but they always said they could not go for one reason or another (these excuses included the two World Wars and the Chicago fires), but they eventually ran short of excuses, so they would have to go. Sabrina convinced Zelda to let her stay home (because Valerie had invited Harvey and Justin round to Sabrina's house to watch scary movies (in the end, they ended up watching The Bridges of Madison County)), and Aunt Beulah sent Sabrina a Molly Dolly. Unfortunately, the doll had a life of its own, and while it terrorized Sabrina and her friends, sealing the doors and windows, Hilda and Zelda ended up trapped in what they thought was an insane asylum, and had their brains switched with those of two chickens. When Sabrina arrived to seek help, Hilda and Zelda learned that Aunt Beulah's parties were theme parties. Travelling to the Spellman household, Beulah stopped the Molly Dolly, who had unleashed a group of monsters, by singing in a high operatic voice. She is one of Lydia's sisters.
- Cousin Doris West: (played by Carol Ann Susi) Appeared in the episode "It's a Mad Mad Mad Mad Season Opener" as the official to issue Sabrina her witch license and took her photograph. Doris was supposed to be the first family member to reveal a clue to the family secret, but we never see what it is. However, Sabrina was too preoccupied with her romance (Harvey versus Dashell) dilemma. Doris, unfortunately, has a bit of a temper, and when she gets angry, she emits a green, slimy goo from her fingers. She later shows up at Sabrina's school where a spell to help Sabrina decide between Harvey and Dashell has gotten completely out of hand, and the two of them are dressed as ninjas and are fighting each other. Sabrina accidentally manages to make Doris lose her temper again, and Doris shoots slime at Harvey and Dashell. Sabrina knocked Harvey to the floor and Dashell got slimed. Doris then left, saying she'll be back later, yet she was never seen or heard from again.
- Boyd, Racine, and Maw-Maw: (played by Gary Grubbs, Loni Anderson & Edie McClurg) Seen only in the episode "Witch Trash", husband and wife, Boyd and Racine, Hilda and Zelda's hillbilly cousins, upset that Hilda and Zelda were in possession of the magic book, sealed the windows and doors of the Spellman house. Sabrina later brought Boyd and Racine, along with Maw-Maw over from the Other Realm to talk things over, but to no avail. Later, when the hillbillies levitated her, Sabrina was ready to give them the book when Great-Granny arrived to set the record straight. Great-Granny told the hillbillies they chose her money while Hilda and Zelda got the magic book. Eventually, Racine unsealed the house and Great-Granny send them home.
- Great Granny: Granny (played by Alice Ghostley) appeared in only one episode, "Witch Trash". She is Hilda's and Zelda's grandmother and Sabrina's great-grandmother. She arrived to settle the feud among Hilda, Zelda and their hillbilly cousins. Granny owned the magic book but passed it down to Hilda and Zelda in one of her many wills. She has a magic bell which she can use to summon family members at any time. Great-Granny does not like to be interrupted, and will discipline those who try to by levitating them into the corner and making them face the wall, which is what she did to Zelda for telling Boyd, Racine, and Maw-Maw to "Let Great-Grandmother talk" right after Great-Granny had given them a warning. Zelda was still floating in the corner as the episode ended.
- Cousin Monty: Monty (played by Dana Gould) appeared in "A Girl And Her Cat", the first series' Christmas episode in which Zelda invited him to Christmas dinner. Monty arrived at the Spellman house with his familiar, Newt (a talking newt, voiced by Billy West), and a wheeled suitcase from which a circus performer named Lulu (played by Kerry Norton) emerged. Newt was one of Salem's underlings in his bid for global conquest, and Salem apparently promised him Denmark, and Monty told Hilda and Zelda Lulu was poor. However, an angry Sabrina left Salem in a dumpster after he stowed away in her bag and got her kicked out of the Slicery. Later, he was kidnapped by a little boy with a lisp who refused to give him up, but Sabrina managed to rescue him. In the end, after accepting Monty's marriage proposal, Lulu revealed she was not poor after all; she had a rich father.
- Jezebelda: Jezebelda is Zelda's evil twin. Her Dolly Parton-style hair and Southern drawl make her distinguishable from Zelda. She shares a cell in the Other Realm Prison with Sabrina's twin, Katrina. Jezebelda appeared in two episodes ("You Can't Twin" and "Deliver Us From E-Mail"). She apparently caused the bubonic plague.
- Katrina: Katrina is Sabrina's evil twin. Unlike Zelda and Jezebelda, Katrina is physically indistinguishable from Sabrina. She and Sabrina faced a series of tests to determine which of the two was the good one and the bad one. When Sabrina was dubbed the evil twin because she had cheated in solving the family secret, she was sentenced to be pushed into a volcano. Katrina pushed her in, but the judge then said that no good twin has ever had the heart to push her evil twin in, but he points out that Hilda almost did (Hilda's twin was never seen on-screen). This last test proved Katrina was the evil twin; Sabrina was saved from the volcano, and Katrina was sent to prison. In her next appearance (in Season Five's You Can't Twin), Katrina stole Sabrina's passport, and slipped into the mortal realm, determined to destroy Sabrina's life. Fortunately, Sabrina was able to get a message to her aunts, who rescued her, and Katrina was sent back to prison. She was last seen in Season Six's "Deliver Us From E-Mail". Sabrina sends Katrina a rude e-mail, fed up over her limericks about a witch from Helsinki who did something with her pinky. In return, Katrina, under the pseudonym "Nasty Girl" e-mailed Sabrina a computer virus which turned Sabrina into a bimbo. Harvey noticed a change in Sabrina's behaviour and took her to her aunts to see if they could find what was wrong with her. Zelda confronted Katrina in the other realm prison, and had to give in to a bribe from her own twin, Jezebelda to get the information she wanted. With Harvey's help, Hilda and Zelda were able to return Sabrina to normal. In the end, Sabrina got her own back on Katrina by e-mailing her a "Kill Them With Kindness" spell. Katrina was last seen giving Jezebelda a pedicure, swearing revenge on Sabrina.
- Sophia Spellman (also played by Melissa Joan Hart) was only seen in "Sabrina Goes to Rome", as it was revealed that Sophia was one of Edward's sisters, who was lost in time during an incident centuries ago. She is identical to her niece, Sabrina.
- Uncle Noonie (unseen) is a Spellman uncle who is deaf and attended a Halloween celebration in the Other Realm during "A Halloween Story".
- Uncle George (unseen) is a Spellman uncle who attended the Spellman Family Reunion in Hawaii with his fat second wife, Ruby (played by Lisa K. Wyatt).
- Uncle Danny (played by David Alan Graf) is a Spellman uncle who attended the Spellman Family Reunion as well, who loves to drink after a celebration.
- Aunt Bootsie (unseen) is a Spellman aunt who apparently has a moustache and loves to kiss everyone. She was mentioned in "The Good, The Bad and the Luau".
- Uncle Clyde (unseen) is Sabrina's uncle, and Cousin Susie's father, mentioned only in "Sabrina and the Beast".
- Cousin Stanislav (unseen) is Sabrina's cousin, mentioned in Sabrina, the Sandman. He gave Sabrina a clue to the family secret; a picture of Sabrina.

== Other characters ==
- Mrs. Quick: Mrs. Quick is mortal and is originally from Indiana and her mother still resides in Terre Haute. She was played by Mary Gross and appeared in 21 episodes. She was very timid and not confident. Sabrina seemed to be her favorite student. In the episode "Finger Flu", Sabrina had finger-flu epidemic and accidentally sneezed her magic into Mrs. Quick. With the magic, Mrs. Quick turned Mr. Kraft into a chimp. Mrs. Quick has several allergies and phobias.
- Drell: Drell (played by Penn Jillette of the Penn and Teller fame) Head of the Witches Council in Season 1. Dated Hilda Spellman on and off and was once engaged but left Hilda at the altar. Is known to send Hilda a pot roast when he's either going to be late to a date or calling it off. Was once stood up on a date by Hilda. The Comic book and Hanna-Barbera Cartoon version is Drella, who is female. It is revealed in Season 6 that he was turned into cattle along with the rest of the old Witches Council and replaced with a group of apathetic young witches and wizards.
- Skippy: Skippy (played by Teller of the Penn and Teller fame) Much like the actor who plays him, Skippy is silent and is only in two episodes: the pilot episode and Jenny's Non-Dream, . Skippy's official title as Drell's assistant is "Skippy, the overlords underling" on his business card, as shown to Jenny while in Limbo, in the Episode "Jenny's Non-Dream".
- Cassandra: Cassandra (Portrayed by Deborah Harry) Cassandra is the only female member shown with the head of the Witches Council, she is featured in the Pilot episode, Where in Sabrina makes a request for a time reversal, to redeem her first day at Westbridge High School. Before her request is "denied" by Drell, She tells Sabrina that she does not have an appointment, then asks Drell if he remembered to feed the candle they have on the table, before exclaiming "Let's humour her." thereby giving Sabrina a chance to explain why she needs to turn back time.
- Justin Thumb: (played by Corbin Allred). A friend of Harvey who played Valerie's love interest in two episodes of Season 3, episodes 2 and 6.
- Rule Bearer: Rules Bearer (portrayed by Morwenna Banks Only appearance: Season 1, Episode 13 "Jenny's Non-Dream"
- Jill and Cee Cee: (played by Bridget Flanery and Melissa Murray respectively) were two mean, popular high school girls and friends of Libby's. They often joined in Libby's taunting of Sabrina and her friends, however in the episode 'When Teens Collide', it was revealed that they'd always liked Sabrina but were simply too afraid of Libby to befriend her. Whilst under the influence of a truth spell, Libby accidentally confessed that Jill had once had a nose job. They never appear after Libby leaves Westbridge.
- Marnie: Marnie (played by Essence Atkins) was a Coffee House Co-worker, as seen in the fourth season during episode 15 "Love in Bloom".
- Cupid: Cupid (played by Patrick Thomas O'Brien first appearance Season 2, Episode 3 "Dummy for Love".
- Duke: Duke (played by Dick Van Dyke) was one of Salem's underlings in his bid to take over the world. While Salem got the 100-year sentence for his crime, Duke and Salem's other underlings got shorter sentences. Upon finishing his sentence, Duke paid the Spellman house a visit. Unfortunately, Duke's magic was very rusty, and he ended up blowing up Hilda's clock shop. In an attempt to help Sabrina be a better dancer, he ended up giving her two right feet (literally), and he also cast a spell that made Harvey act like a little boy.
- Caligula: (played by Glenn Shadix) appeared in the episode "Salem, The Boy". When Hilda and Zelda wanted to throw Salem a Birthday Party, they Perform a time travel chant into the past to see what one of Salem's "ideal parties" was, they discover "Caligula" there as Caligula tries to serve and flirt with Hilda and Zelda, they quickly Bail and Caligula somehow stowaways or follows them back home. Meanwhile, Salem is running around Sabrina's school as Gordy, being it was Sabrina's Birthday Gift to Salem from 1 of Roland's 3 wish tickets. (Roland was a Leprechaun in this episode, This episode was also St. Patrick's Day themed.)
- Annabelle Saberhagen: Annabelle (portrayed by Victoria Jackson) is Salem's daughter, whom he loves dearly. A rift developed between the two while Annabelle was growing up because Salem was always away, and Salem rarely contacted her due to his shame of being a cat. When an announcement was made that Annabelle was to marry a man named Larid Prescott, Sabrina went to see Annabelle, and helped mend the rift between her and her father, and Salem performed all duties of father of the bride that he could in his furry state. Sabrina agreed to be Annabelle's maid of honour, but she soon discovered that an Other Realm wedding has strange traditions; the groom wears a suit of armour, the maid of honour wears cowboy boots and a Napoleon-style hat, has to carry a sapling down the aisle, blow up a balloon, and the father of the bride must wrestle the father of the groom for the permission of allowing his son to marry the bride. Because Salem was a cat, and in his own words "Protected by the humane society", Sabrina had to take on the father of the groom Xavier "The Avenger" Prescott (played by then-WWE wrestler, Billy Gunn). Thanks to interference by Salem, Sabrina pinned Prescott after a roll-up. Next, the bride and groom had to exchange ring fingers, and Sabrina had to kiss the bride. Annabelle was never seen again. Sabrina notes that Annabelle had inherited Salem's "cry."
- Candy King: Roxie's mother (played by Kate Jackson of Charlie's Angels fame) appeared in It's a Hot, Hot, Hot, Hot Christmas in Season Seven. A rift developed between her and her daughter because of her criminal past. Roxie was anything but pleased to see her. Later, when the condo that Roxie, Morgan, and Sabrina were staying in was robbed, Candy was accused. In the end, though, her boyfriend, Zack is revealed to be the true culprit. He tries to make a run for the door, but Sabrina quickly cast a spell so that when he opened the door, he found himself facing a group of Christmas Caroller's who were singing the line "We Won't Go Until We Get Some" from "We Wish You A Merry Christmas". With her reputation cleared, Candy patched things up with her daughter.
- Kevin: Mid-season 5, Sabrina meets Kevin, a student from Adams whom she constantly seems to bump into but is officially introduced through her roommate Morgan. Kevin is a guitar player and apparently got inspiration from Sabrina to write songs, even calling her his muse. They only seem to date for one month and ends as Sabrina and Kevin don't seem to find time to define their romantic relationship.
- Louisa: Louisa is the woman in the portrait seen on the wall of the kitchen of the Spellman house. She spoke for the first time in Bundt Friday when Zelda was telling Sabrina about a secret cabinet where they kept some of their potions, and it turns out Louisa's portrait was hung on the cabinet door. Louisa spoke again in Dream Date after Sabrina hung up the phone after Harvey called asking her about their science homework, and when she realised Louisa had been listening, Sabrina stomped up the stairs while Louisa sang Salem's song, "Harvey and Sabrina". She spoke for the last time in the episode "In Sabrina We Trust", in which she informs Sabrina about the upcoming magical systems check to be performed on the house. Louisa's voice was originally provided by Caroline Rhea, but her voice was sped up electronically so her voice would not be recognized. Annie O'Donnell was the voice of Louisa the last time she spoke.
- Juliette Jingleheimer: Juliette is Dreama's cat. A former prom queen, Juliette (voice of Bebe Neuwirth) was turned into a cat for attempting to take over the universe, but unlike Salem, Juliette has longer hair, and is white. Salem was looking for a date for a high-school reunion, so Sabrina and Dreama fixed him up with Juliette. Later, though, Salem was confronted by Billy Luto, a man who had bullied Salem as a teenager. When Juliette stood up to Billy, he tried to give both of them a wedgie, but Sabrina, who was close by, quickly hung Billy up by his "heenie" (just as he did to Salem).
- Gordie: Gordie is Sabrina's nerdy friend in high school, played by Curtis Andersen. Gordie lacks the confidence to stand up for himself, but has the heart of a loyal friend. He often hangs out with Sabrina, Valerie, and Harvey, and sometimes Libby. He and Valerie sometimes show sparks, but never really had a relationship.
- Roland: (played by Phil Fondacaro) A troll who had a long-time crush on Sabrina and on several occasions tried to steal her heart or marry her with magic, but always ended up failing. He has three different jobs: a finder, an equalizer and a detective. He calls Harvey is "farm boy". Appears in "Troll Bride", "The Equalizer", "Suspicious Minds", "Salem the Boy" and "Love in Bloom". It is possible he is Rumpelstiltskin as mentioned by Sabrina in "The Equalizer". As part of keeping her status as a witch a secret from Harvey, Sabrina refers to Roland as her cousin to Harvey.
- Stonehenge: (voiced by Richard Steven Horvitz) A guinea pig familiar taken care of by Gwen. Unlike other animal familiars in the series, it is left ambiguous as to whether or not Stoney was once a human who was punished for misdeeds. Though Salem initially attempts to eat him, he ultimately forms a partnership with him in order to obtain free food.
- Bob Gordon: Bob was a news anchor who was judging a cat show that Sabrina entered Salem in. However, Sabrina found out that the owner of one of the other cats entered in the competition was using a photo of Bob without his hairpiece to blackmail him into throwing the competition. When Sabrina showed the photo to her aunts, Zelda used a reverse angle spell to reveal the culprit, but the blackmailers face was hidden by a big camera with only the right hand visible. However, Sabrina noticed the blackmailer was missing half an index finger. Sabrina's investigation hit a dead end when she found her three prime suspects were all missing half an index finger on the right hand, but she confronted Bob Gordon over his secret, and she found he was afraid his career would be ruined if everyone knew he was bald, because he said the public had not trusted a bald man since Eisenhower. However, Bob finally came clean and ripped off his wig in front of all the contestants before disqualifying the blackmailer.
- Annie Martos: (played by Diana-Maria Riva) Annie was Sabrina's boss when she became a writer at Scorch Magazine. Sabrina made countless attempts to make Annie like her. In the end, she found her insults too much and quit her job.
- Cole Harper: (played Andrew Walker) Cole was Sabrina's co-worker at Scorch Magazine.
- James: (played by Bumper Robinson) James was Sabrina's co-worker at Scorch Magazine. He worked as a professional photographer. Bumper Robinson also appeared in the Season 1 episode, Trial By Fury portraying a completely different character.
- Leonard: (played by John Ducey) Leonard was Sabrina's co-worker at Scorch Magazine. He was most unprofessional, and often tried to grab an opportunity with a girl. He also has an interest of collecting action figures. He invited Sabrina, Morgan, and Roxie to a condo in Miami to celebrate Christmas after James and Cole bailed.
- Peter: (played by Greg Vaughan) Sabrina's arranged groom. Both did not have feelings for each other, in fact, Peter fell in love with Roxie and Roxie, Peter. This was a problem for Sabrina since Great Aunt Irma, the matriarch, wanted Sabrina to marry Peter, and Roxie and Peter's relationship was unknown to Irma, which almost made chaos at the wedding, but Sabrina was in position as the bride and later stood to Great Aunt Irma about the marriage after Peter said he did not want to marry Sabrina, he wanted to marry Roxie.

== Lost in Time people ==
In Season Four, Hilda bought a clock shop which had what seemed like an ordinary grandfather clock in the back room. However it turned out to be a magical Lost in Time clock from which certain people from past centuries or decades emerged. These people included:

- Marie and Pierre Curie: In Ageing Not So Gracefully, the Curies became lost in time after having an argument (circa 1899). Marie was first to come from the clock. When Hilda got her to the house, she was spouting French, but Zelda turned her French to English with her magic. Pierre later turned up, and Hilda and Zelda tried to find out what attracted one Curie to the other. While Hilda danced with Pierre, Zelda worked with Marie. However, Hilda soon became too tired to dance, and Zelda soon got fed up of Marie's bossing her about, and accidentally setting the carpet on fire. Luckily, following another argument which Hilda and Zelda could hear from the kitchen, they started waltzing around the living room where Marie accidentally knocked over Zelda's vase. It is also revealed in season 3 that Marie dated Salem before cheating on him with Pierre.
- Leif Ericson and Daniel Boone: In Salem's Daughter, Hilda and Zelda used the Lost in Time clock to get dates for Anabelle's wedding. Zelda selected Leif Ericson, and Hilda picked Daniel Boone. Daniel appeared again in the following episode, Love in Bloom (which aired before Salem's Daughter, but is set afterwards) in which Zelda learns that Hilda has been hiding him in the attic, and forces her to send him back. A running gag throughout Salem's Daughter is that Daniel is frequently mistaken for Davy Crockett, make Daniel replies "I´m Daniel Boone" a gets a little angry; this happens so often, when somebody (Salem) says he real name, he screams "I´M DANIEL BOONE! Oh, sorry..."

== Celebrity guest appearances ==
Many episodes involve Sabrina getting to meet, through natural or supernatural means, popular real-life musical artists of the time, including the band of Melissa Joan Hart's then-boyfriend (now husband) Mark Wilkerson, appeared in an episode in 2002.

- Eddie Cibrian appeared as himself in The True Adventures of Rudy Kazootie S.1 Ep.3 when Sabrina said his name three times and he appeared in her room saying that he needed to save David Hasselhoff from a burning corvette.
- Milo Ventimiglia appeared as a football player in "Terrible Things S.1 Ep. 4" when Jenny is running for student body president, against Libby, both are fighting for his signature.
- Randy Travis made a cameo appearance as himself (credited as Ideal Man) in The True Adventures of Rudy Kazootie. S.1 Ep.3 He's seen at the parent-teacher conference in Mr. Pool's room then towards the end doing a jigsaw puzzle with Hilda and Zelda.
- Sally Jessy Raphael appeared in the opening scene of "A Halloween Story", S. 1 Ep. 5. Sabrina was wearing a Halloween costume consisting only of a pair of red-rimmed glasses, similar to Sally Jessy Raphael's. Hilda and Zelda were not sure what to make of it, so Sabrina invited her aunts to do better. Hilda pointed at Sabrina, and when the smoke cleared, Sabrina had been turned into Sally Jessy Raphael, complete with her voice.
- Cary-Hiroyuki Tagawa The Japanese American actor appeared in Sweet and Sour Victory S.1 Ep.10 as a karate master who fought Sabrina twice, once when she cheated with a spell and a (magic-free) rematch in which he won with ease.
- Jack Wagner Jack appeared as himself in Jenny's Non-Dream S.1 Ep.13 when Jenny is in the other realm and Sabrina, Hilda and Zelda try to convince she is dreaming, Jenny mentions that Jack Wagner is in her dreams saving her from something, So Sabrina zaps in Jack and Jenny jumps in his arms and tells him about all the things he has saved her from, Later Sabrina zaps him away.
- Brady Anderson Brady Anderson Major League baseball player guest starred as himself in Sabrina Through the Looking Glass S.1 Ep.14 helping Sabrina through her bad mood when she was trapped in her mirror by her bad mood and she could not get out of the mirror.
- Peter Marshall appeared as himself (credited as Game Show Host) in First Kiss S.1 Ep.17 hosting a fictional game show called "The True Love Game Show" (Probably a parody of The Dating Game) when Sabrina kissed Harvey and he turned into a frog. She had to take a test of true love and the game show was her first test behind door number one.
- Erik Estrada Erik Estrada Actor from CHiPs has made a few cameo appearances in Sabrina Gets Her License: Part 1 S.2 Ep.1 and Sabrina Gets Her License: Part 2 S.2 Ep.2, i.e. Being seen in a thought cloud in Hilda's mind and driving a car when Hilda created a defective potion zapping her and Zelda into his car and another time when Sabrina Accidentally zapped herself in his car.
- Davy Jones The Monkees' lead vocalist appeared in the episode Dante's Inferno S.2 Ep.4; Jones first appeared at the start of the episode when Hilda, who was suffering from punitis (a condition that makes puns out of things she says), said something about a monkey on her back. Jones made a second appearance when Sabrina was making comments about the name of Harvey's date, Jean; Jones told Sabrina he thought Jean was a lovely name, and he started to sing the chorus from Daydream Believer. The end of the show Jones helps Sabrina and her aunts walk together like The Monkees at the start of their show.
- Drew Carey Appeared in episode To Tell a Mortal S.2 Ep.10 when Valerie's last wish is to dance with him. Both Drew and she magically acquire evening wear. Valerie later keeps his glasses.
- Mark Langston Mark Langston Major League Baseball Player appeared as himself in To Tell A Mortal S.2 Ep.10 when Harvey made a wish(his last wish) that he could meet him and Mark comes and Harvey asks him to throw a baseball to him and catch it.
- Steve Allen, actor, appeared as Sabrina's fear in "Fear Strikes Up a Conversation", S. 2 Ep. 21 when Sabrina is told she has to present her math essay at an assembly, When she hears that she uses a magic spell to get rid of her fear, but her fear gets loose and starts scaring the whole school, When that happens she has to go through the forest of her fears and conquer them and her last fear was reading in front of the assembly, When she did her fear disappeared and Steve Allen appeared as Fear and a small version of his body was put on Sabrina's jacket to remind her that fear will always be a part of her. He was credited as Fear in the credits. When Sabrina sees Fear she says My fear looks like Steve Allen, and when a small version of Steve appeared on her jacket she said "So is Steve Allen gonna be on all my clothes?"
- Kenan Thompson and Kel Mitchell guest-starred as themselves in "Sabrina's Choice" S. 2 Ep. 24 when Sabrina had to choose which aunt she wanted to live with and there was a little crystal ball with a "What-If" spell and she said "What If Kenan & Kel Won the lottery?" Kenan and Kel appeared in their house where Kenan was looking for the lottery ticket while Kel is making a sandwich and Kenan finds it and accidentally puts it in the sandwich that Kel was making and runs and says that he found the ticket, Kel comes back in the kitchen not realizing that the ticket is in the sandwich he made and puts the remaining ingredients he was going to put on plus the other bread and starts eating the sandwich, Kenan comes back and sees that Kel is eating the sandwich and he got sad.
- Gary Owens Gary Owens appeared in the episode Good Will Haunting S.3 Ep.6 where Hilda and Zelda were invited to Aunt Beaulah's Halloween party, and Beaulah switched their brains with those of two chickens. In the closing credits, he was credited as "The Guy Who Thinks He's Gary Owens".
- Ruth Buzzi Ruth Buzzi appeared as a witch named Delilah who was a guest at Aunt Beaulah's Halloween party in the episode Good Will Haunting S.3 Ep.6
- Alan Sues Laugh-In alumnus Alan Sues played a warlock named Bellevuedere at Aunt Beaulah's Halloween party in the episode Good Will Haunting S.3 Ep.6. The name Bellevuedere is a portmanteau of New York City’s Bellevue Hospital and famed literary character Mr. Belvedere.
- Dick Clark Dick Clark made a cameo appearance as himself in And the Sabrina Goes To... S.3 Ep.8 when Sabrina says that she's giving all of her Sabrina Awards to Gordy and the other Do-gooders and he is in a studio and says "What's Sabrina Doing, This never happens at the American Music Awards Cue the band, Cue the band."
- Mary Hart Mary Hart appeared as herself in And The Sabrina Goes To... S.3 Ep.8 hosting the first annual Sabrina Awards when Sabrina was tired of not getting any praise for her hard work so she ate some special cake to get praise which brought up the idea for the Sabrina Awards.
- José Eber José appeared as himself in Sabrina and the Beast S.3 Ep.10 when Sabrina was having a bad hair day so she zapped Jose into her bedroom to help her with her hair, Her and Hilda kept fighting over for whose hair he should do and he said he charges 1,000 dollars an hour.
- Jerry Springer Springer appeared in Mrs. Kraft S.3 Ep.14 where Sabrina and Hilda bring back Mr. Kraft's ex-wife, Lucy, to lure him away. The Spellman's, Mr. Kraft, and Lucy all ended up on The Jerry Springer Show (a production of Studios USA Television, now NBC Universal Television Distribution.) Sabrina said she was not comfortable living with Mr. Kraft, so she and Hilda decided to bring back Lucy. When the audience gasped in shock, Sabrina said she did not know Lucy was a witch, and Hilda started yelling at the audience (most of what she was saying was bleeped out to make it sound like she was swearing). Their appearance on the show ended with a fight between Zelda and Lucy. In this series, he appears to have magical powers.
- Steve Sax Steve Sax Major League Baseball Player guest starred as himself (Credited as Baseball Player) in Sabrina the Matchmaker S.3 Ep.16 when Sabrina's Cousin Marigold was on a date with a plumber named Emil and He was talking about Baseball, Marigold went into the kitchen telling Sabrina she had no idea what he was talking about and Sabrina Told her and then Marigold zapped Steve into the kitchen and Sabrina said, "Wait, You can't just walk in there with a professional baseball player."
- Mary Ann Mobley Mary Ann Mobley made a brief guest appearance as herself in Salem, the Boy S.3 Ep.17 when Salem is planning a party and she is on the list. At the end of the episode, Mary Ann Mobley comes and Zelda says Oh, Hello Mary Ann Mobley and she replies "And What is Castro doing here?"
- Monty Hall Monty Hall guest starred as himself in The Long and Winding Short Cut S.3 Ep.22 hosting a fictional game show called "Guess The Family Secret" when Sabrina was trying to figure out the Family Secret to her Family and she used Mrs. Quick to help her and Mrs. Quick was excited to be on the show and Sabrina needed to move things along so she zapped Monty Hall to host and as the game show went on when Mrs. Quick was on the second clue Aunt Zelda comes in and stops Sabrina from Cheating to figure out the Family Secret.
- Britney Spears Britney appeared in No Place Like Home S.4 Ep.1 when Harvey gives Sabrina parking passes to the Britney Spears concert because he cannot afford tickets to the show. Sabrina's dad wants her to move to Paris with him and his wife. While there, Sabrina becomes bored so her dad magically zaps in Britney who performs in their living room. They talk a little and dance a little and then Sabrina zaps her back. She decides to move back in with her aunts and she is seen with Harvey in the parking lot of the concert. Britney comes out of the concert hall and waves at Sabrina. At the end of the show Mr. Kraft is being his usual uptight self when Sabrina puts a spell on him to start dancing in the school halls to "(You Drive Me) Crazy", the theme song to Melissa Joan Hart's movie Drive Me Crazy. The music video was shown during the credits of the show, which starred Melissa.
- Tara Lipinski Tara Lipinski, professional figure skater, appeared as herself in Jealousy S.4 Ep.3 when a new student named Brad transferred to Westbridge and Sabrina was getting jealous of him because Harvey kept hanging out with him and Sabrina zapped Tara into her room and Tara says where am I and then Sabrina says to her "You're my new best friend" and takes her to school with her to show everybody, All the students are all surrounding her and asking her questions, and later Tara says I liked your friends especially Brad, and when Tara says that Sabrina says, "Go find yourself a new best friend" and zaps her away.
- Billy Blanks Billy appeared as himself at the beginning of Prelude to a Kiss S.4 Ep.7 when Salem wanted to learn karate and Sabrina zapped him in and he did a move which Sabrina tried to do and she ended up kicking Salem into the wall.
- Paula Abdul The pop singer/American Idol judge appeared in Aging Not So Gracefully S.4 Ep.8". Salem becomes obsessed with her after seeing her music video for Opposites Attract, and after failing to contact her, Salem started pretending to be kidnapped, sending her photos and a ransom note (which did not work). Abdul also appeared during the end credits, reading a note (obviously penned by Salem) which asked her to "comfort my cat". The episode ended with Paula stroking Salem.
- Danny Bonaduce Appeared in the Christmas-themed episode Sabrina, Nipping at Your Nose. S.4 Ep.12 As one of a series of gifts inspired by the song "The Twelve Days of Christmas", Sabrina zaps him in as he's sitting in a pear tree ("Partridge in a Pear Tree").
- John Salley John appeared as himself (credited as NBA Player) in Welcome Back, Duke S.4 Ep.16 when Hilda and Zelda were having trouble coaching Sabrina's basketball team so they got him to coach them because he was tall and the girls behaved better. Towards the end of the episode Harvey says he had a dream about him and told Sabrina that he said he was going to give him a time out.
- Frankie Avalon Frankie appeared as himself in Beach Blanket Bizarro S.5 Ep.17 when Hilda and Zelda find out Sabrina will be going to Pelican Cove, Florida with her boyfriend and they just want her to have "Good Clean Fun" so they zap in Frankie Avalon in their house and tell him about where Sabrina is going. Later he appears at the end of the episode doing the Swim with Hilda and Zelda.
- Sisqó Sisqó appeared as a vampire and a professional actor in The Other Realm name Vladimir Kortensky in "Really Big Season Opener, S.6 EP.1". He starred in 47 other realm plays and advertised "Blood Light" before looking for work in The Mortal Realm during an Other Realm actors strike. Vladimir achieves the role of main vampire in Sabrina and Miles' horror movie. Sabrina discovers he is a real vampire, intent on drinking the blood of his fellow cast members. Sabrina fights Vladimir and rather than staking him, conjures a steak (which is just as effective) and uses it to disintegrate Vladimir. Hilda Spellman morphs into Vladimir to fill his role in the film.
- Adrienne Barbeau Adrienne appeared as herself in The Gift of Gab S.6 Ep.5 when Miles sold a cut-out of her on eBay. Miles's is at the Coffee House telling Sabrina that he had to sell it, Adrienne comes in the Coffee House telling him that she was the high bidder and that she has been looking for a cut-out of her for a long time.
- Isaac Hanson Isaac along with his brothers appeared in A Birthday Witch S.6 Ep.9. Isaac and Roxie used to go out before he became famous. Miles and Morgan get really excited when they find out Isaac will be coming. Isaac is late but he finds Roxie at the soup kitchen. The Hanson brothers perform a show at the soup kitchen.
- Andy Roddick Andy Roddick Professional Tennis Player guest starred as himself in The Competition S.6 Ep.17 helping Sabrina with her Tennis skills when her boyfriend Josh always said to her that he was gonna "Polish her off" every time they play a Tennis game.
- Kelly Clarkson appeared as a student in the episode The Whole Ball of Wax S.6 Ep.20, prior to her appearance and subsequent fame on American Idol.
- Carson Daly Carson Daly and his MTV show TRL guest starred as himself in I Fall to Pieces (1) S.6 Ep.22/Total Sabrina Live! (2) S.7 Ep.1 hosting Total Request Live when Sabrina was looking for a job to be a writer, Roxie wanted to be on TRL to see Carson, Later Sabrina says on TRL that she's looking for a job. Guest starred but was uncredited in the credits list.
- Daniel Bedingfield appeared in "The Lyin', The Witch, And The Wardrobe", S. 7 Ep. 11. He first appeared wearing a ghastly outfit designed by Morgan, and he ended up with green feathers in his hair. At the end of the episode, he sang "Gotta Get Thru This".

=== Other musical guests ===
- Coolio ("A Girl and Her Cat S.1 Ep. 11")
- Violent Femmes ("Hilda and Zelda: The Teenage Years S.1 Ep. 15")
- The Smashing Pumpkins (only mentioned in "The Great Mistake S.1 Ep. 22" episode when Sabrina's friend Jenny gets tickets to one of their concerts, which Sabrina did not get to go to.)
- 10,000 Maniacs ("A River of Candy Corn Runs Through It S.2 Ep. 7")
- Johnny Mathis ("Sabrina Claus S.2 Ep. 12")
- Backstreet Boys ("The Band Episode S.2 Ep. 18")
- Lisa Loeb (Background music only in "Sabrina's Choice S.2 Ep. 24" when Harvey and Sabrina went to a concert featuring her; not actually seen.)
- RuPaul ("Sabrina's Choice S.2 Ep. 24") S.2 Ep. 24
- Phantom Planet ("And the Sabrina Goes To... S3 Ep.8")
- NSYNC ("Sabrina and the Pirates S.3 Ep. 15")
- Aaron Carter ("Beach Blanket Bizarro S.5 Ep. 17")
- Eden's Crush ("Finally! S.5 Ep. 22")
- Hanson ("A Birthday Witch S.6 Ep. 9")
- Vitamin C ("Cloud Ten S.6 Ep. 11")
- Usher ("I Think I Love You S.6 Ep. 13")
- Course of Nature ("Total Sabrina Live! S.7 Ep. 1")
- Ashanti ("Call Me Crazy S.7 Ep. 3")
- Da Brat as Baby K2K ("Shift Happens S.7 Ep. 4")
- Goo Goo Dolls ("Witch Way Out S.7 Ep. 7")
- Avril Lavigne ("Bada-Ping! S.7 Ep. 8")
- Drew Lachey ("Ping, Ping a Song S.7 Ep. 10")
- Sixpence None the Richer ("Getting to Nose You S.7 Ep. 16")
- Mario ("What a Witch Wants S.7 Ep. 21")
