= Elisa Donovan =

American actress (born 1971)

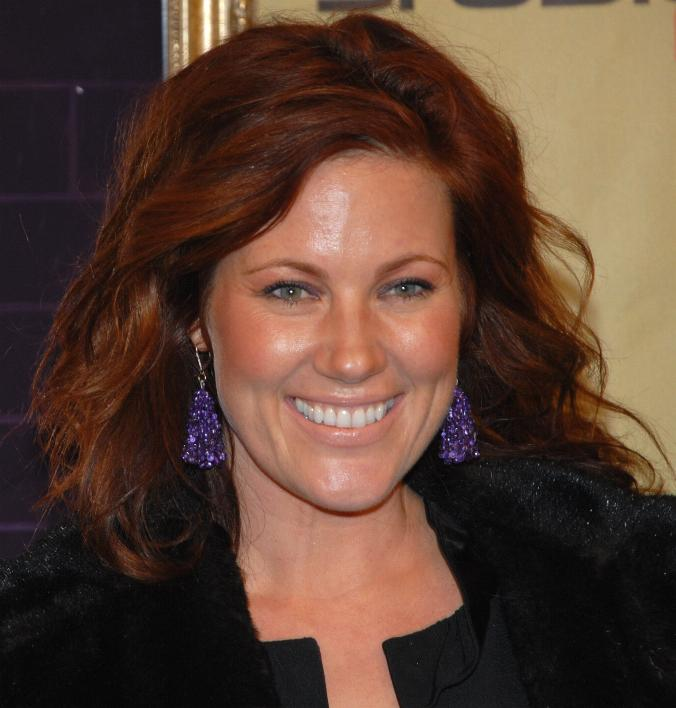
- Donovan at the "Remember to Give" Holiday Party in December 2007
- Born: February 3, 1971 (age 55); Poughkeepsie, New York, U.S.
- Occupation: Actress
- Years active: 1994–present
- Spouse: Charlie Bigelow (m. 2012)
- Children: 1

Elisa Donovan (born February 3, 1971) is an American actress. She played the role of Amber Mariens in the 1995 teen comedy film Clueless, and reprised her role in the TV series of the same name (1996-1999). Donovan went on to play the role of Morgan Cavanaugh in the sitcom Sabrina the Teenage Witch (2000–2003).

Her memoir, Wake Me When You Leave, was released in June 2021.

== Early life ==
Donovan was born in Poughkeepsie, New York, the daughter of Charlotte and Jack Donovan, who was a business executive. She also has two siblings, Marc and Pam Donovan.

== Career ==
Donovan's breakthrough role was in the 1995 film Clueless as Amber, Cher's nemesis. Donovan also reprised her role in the television series of the same name. Other notable roles included the film A Night at the Roxbury, Beverly Hills, 90210 as Ginger LaMonica and playing Morgan Cavanaugh on the television sitcom Sabrina, the Teenage Witch. She also played Sharona on Disney Channel's Sonny with a Chance, and has appeared in the films Complacent, The Dog Who Saved Christmas, and its sequel The Dog Who Saved the Holidays. Donovan starred in the web series, The Lake on TheWB.com. She also played Gayle in the web series In Gayle We Trust on NBC.com.

Donovan had a role in the film A Golden Christmas, where she played Anna. In 2006, she played a guest role in the NCIS episode "Dead and Unburied". She was featured in 'N Sync's 1999 music video for "Thinking of You (I Drive Myself Crazy)" as the love interest for Joey Fatone. She competed on the twenty-fourth season of Worst Cooks in America, the show's seventh celebrity edition titled That's So '90s, which aired in April/May 2022.

== Personal life ==
Donovan has been married to her husband Charlie Bigelow since October 13, 2012. They have a daughter, Scarlett Avery Bigelow.

== Filmography ==
=== Film ===
Year	Title	Role	Notes
1995	Clueless	Amber Mariens	
1995	Guns on the Clackamas: A Documentary	Crazy Actress	
1995	Café Babel	Lover (she)	Short
1996	Encino Woman	Ivana	TV movie
1997	Justice League of America	Cheryl	TV movie
1998	A Night at the Roxbury	Cambi	
1999	15 Minutes	E.D.	Short
1999	Loving Jezebel	Salli	
1999	Pop	Nora	
2000	Best Actress	Lori Seefer	TV movie
2001	Liars Club	Mae	
2001	Rebound Guy	Alexandra	Short
2002	Wolves of Wall Street	Annabella Morris	
2004	A Girl's Guide to Depravity	-	Short
2004	Eve's Christmas	Eve Simon	TV movie
2006	Kiss Me Again	Malika	
2006	National Lampoon's TV: The Movie	Suzy Gottlieb	
2006	Rocker	Martina	
2007	Framed for Murder	June Baldwin	TV movie
2007	It Was One of Us	Carson O'Connor	TV movie
2008	Shark Swarm	Brenda	TV movie
2008	15 Minutes of Fame	Red	
2009	The Dog Who Saved Christmas	Belinda Bannister	TV movie
2009	A Golden Christmas	Anna	TV movie
2010	The Dog Who Saved Christmas Vacation	Belinda Bannister	TV movie
2011	A Valentine's Date	Laura Connors	TV movie
2011	The Dog Who Saved Halloween	Belinda Bannister	TV movie
2011	Spooky Buddies	Janice	Video
2011	12 Wishes of Christmas	Laura Lindsey	TV movie
2012	Complacent	Jennifer Pulchek	
2012	The Dog Who Saved the Holidays	Belinda Bannister	TV movie
2012	MoniKa	Andrea	
2012	Chasing Happiness	Jen	
2014	The Dog Who Saved Easter	Belinda Bannister	
2015	The Dog Who Saved Summer	Belinda Bannister	
2017	MDMA	Mary	
2025	Double Scoop	Alexandra	TV movie

=== Television ===
Year	Title	Role	Notes
1994	Blossom	Tanya	Recurring Cast: Season 5
1995	Renegade	Tina Douglas	Episode: "The Ballad of D.B. Cooper"
1995	Simon	Holly	Episode: "Simon Gets Carl a Job"
1995–1996	Beverly Hills, 90210	Ginger LaMonica	Recurring Cast: Season 6
1996–1999	Clueless	Amber Mariens	Main Cast
1999	Oh Baby	Jennifer Xavier	Episode: "Sitting on Babies"
1999	Just Shoot Me!	Amber	Episode: "Jack Gets Tough"
2000	Jack & Jill	Annie	Recurring Cast: Season 1
2000–2003	Sabrina, the Teenage Witch	Morgan Cavanaugh	Main Cast: Season 5-7
2001	The Test	Herself/Panelist	Episode: "The Trust Test"
2001	E! True Hollywood Story	Herself	Episode: "Clueless"
2001	Spyder Games	Gail Sanders	Episode: "Episode #1.43"
2001–2002	Hollywood Squares	Herself/Panelist	Recurring Panelist
2004	Crossballs: The Debate Show	Herself	Episode: "Voting Electible Dysfunction"
2004	Judging Amy	Shelby Crawford	Recurring Cast: Season 5
2006	NCIS	Rebecca Kemps	Episode: "Dead and Unburied"
2008	Janice & Abbey	Herself	Episode: "California Dreaming"
2008	Turbo Dates	Herself	Episode: "3:10 to Puma"
2009	Sonny with a Chance	Sharona	Episode: "Poll'd Apart"
2009	The Lake	Leslie	Main Cast
2009–2011	In Gayle We Trust	Gayle Evans	Main Cast
2012	Whole Day Down	Nadine	Recurring Cast: Season 1
2014	Melissa & Joey	Darcey	Episode: "Catch & Release"
2015	HOARS (Home Owner Association Regency Supreme)	Julia Roberts	Episode: "No Mold, Parasites and Cocaine 244(b-1)"
2022	Worst Cooks in America	Herself/Contestant	Contestant: Season 24
2024	NCIS	Carol	Episode: "Prime Cut"

=== Music Videos ===
Year	Artist	Song	Role
1999	NSYNC	"Thinking of You (I Drive Myself Crazy)"	Joey's Girlfriend
2014	Iggy Azalea featuring Charli XCX	"Fancy"	Amber
