= In Gayle We Trust =

American web series

In Gayle We Trust is a comedic web series developed and produced by Ryan Noggle NBCUniversal Digital Studio in partnership with Andy Hayman at Mindshare Entertainment and the show's sole sponsor, American Family Insurance. The series centers around Gayle Evans (Elisa Donovan), a small-town insurance agent and her host of colorful and quirky clients.

Season one, written and directed by Brent Forrester (The Office (US), The Simpsons) premiered in September 2009. Season two, directed by Sandy Smolan and written by Tim McKeon and Kevin Seccia, premiered in July 2010. Season 3, which follows the town's pursuit of staging an insurance-themed, Broadway-style musical, launched in October 2011. Season 3 was directed by Jason Farrand and written by Anthony Q. Farrell, Ryan Noggle and Andy Hayman.

== Plot ==
=== Season 1 (2009) ===
Maple Grove is home to a cast of characters, all of whom turn to one person for insurance, counseling, and much more. Though an insurance agent by trade, Gayle Evans has become the town’s default fix-all, as her disposition and advice have made her a resource for her clients. From a newlywed couple seeking weekly marital advice to a plumber trying to protect his identity and a hypnotist needing liability coverage, Gayle’s clientele range from sympathetic to pathetic to bizarre.

=== Season 2 (2010) ===
In Season two, Gayle's clientele range from sweet to sympathetic to outright bizarre. From first-time expecting parents needing baby advice, to a plumber-by-day-rock-star-by-night egomaniac, to a hair-brained hair stylist in need of small business insurance, Gayle's got her hands full. She becomes a friend, psychiatrist and advisor to the colorful and quirky locals of Maple Grove.

=== Season 3 (2011) ===
Returning from lunch on a Monday, Maple Grove insurance agent Gayle Evans is approached by a stranger, Rafael, who reveals to Gayle that he’s close to completing his first musical, Policies! Policies!, a love story about a small town insurance agent who helps his clients’ dreams come true. Rafael has arrived not only to find inspiration from his muse, Gayle, but to stage the entire production before introducing Broadway to its next blockbuster smash hit.

It is soon revealed that Rafael is not the confident impresario he pretends to be, but an insecure man with a half-baked script. Gayle finds herself in charge of protecting and realising Rafael's dream, suddenly responsible for wrangling clueless executive producers and difficult actors. It is up to Gayle to navigate the roadblocks in the path to making 'Policies! Policies!' the smash hit Rafael believes it to be.

== Response ==
Season one of In Gayle We Trust attracted nearly 3 million views. In aggregate, the branded digital series yielded a 20% lift in quote starts and a 24% increase in purchase intent for American Family Insurance. Since its online debut, In Gayle We Trust has garnered 24 million viewers at a 76% completion rate.
