= The Dog Who Saved Christmas Vacation =

2010 American television film

- Written by: Michael Ciminera; Richard Gnolfo
- Directed by: Michael Feifer
- Starring: Mario Lopez; Paris Hilton; Elisa Donovan; Dean Cain; Joey Diaz
- Music by: Andres Boulton
- Original language: English

Production
- Producers: Michael Feifer; Jeffrey Schenck
- Editor: Sean Olson
- Running time: 90 minutes
- Production company: Hybrid

Original release
- Network: ABC Family
- Release: November 28, 2010

The Dog Who Saved Christmas Vacation is a 2010 American made-for-television Christmas comedy film and a sequel to the ABC Family 2009 movie The Dog Who Saved Christmas. The movie stars Paris Hilton in her first voice role, as the poodle Bella, and Mario Lopez again voices Zeus. It premiered on ABC Family on November 28, 2010 during the Countdown to 25 Days of Christmas programming block and was written by Michael Ciminera and Richard Gnolfo.

== Plot ==
The Bannister family and their dog Zeus go to a ski lodge in Colorado for their Christmas vacation. When they get to their condo, they find Belinda Bannister's brother and his son staying in the same condo. Along with the boys is a poodle named Bella, and Zeus immediately has a crush on her. Despite the surprised guests there, George tries to have the best Christmas ever.

Meanwhile, Ted and Stewey are after London James's necklace. They steal it, but they accidentally leave it at the gift shop, where George (thinking it's a $5 dog collar) lets Zeus buy it for Bella. Ted and Stewey kidnap Bella, so Zeus goes after her, following the two crooks to their hotel room. Ted and Stewey go to get Chinese food as Zeus enters to save Bella. Zeus starts to set up booby traps. Stewey and Ted come back and end up chasing Zeus through the house and through booby traps. Zeus frees Bella and the two try to escape but get caught by the two robbers. Zeus and Bella finally escape with the help of Trooper, a service dog who had a crush on Bella, and used to bully Zeus. Zeus and Bella end up getting chased back to the village by Ted and Stewey. Zeus then finishes the thieves off by knocking down a tower of Christmas presents. The family finds the dogs at the village. London James gets her necklace back, Ted and Stewey are arrested, and Zeus and Bella become a couple.

== Cast ==
- Mario Lopez as Zeus
- Paris Hilton as Bella
- Elisa Donovan as Belinda Bannister
- Dean Cain as Ted Stein
- Joey Diaz as Stewey McMann
- Brennan Bailey as Ben Bannister
- Kayley Stallings as Kara Bannister
- Carlson Young as London James
- Michael Healey as Trooper/rescue dog

== See also ==
- List of Christmas films
