= Joey Diaz =

American stand-up comedian, actor, and podcast host (born 1963)

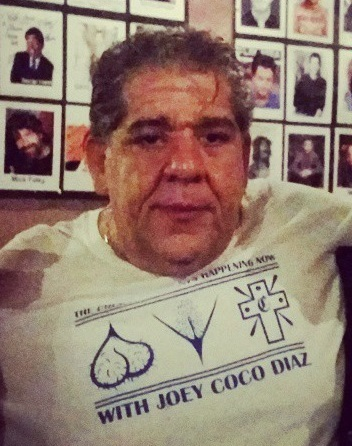
- Diaz in 2015
- Born: José Antonio Díaz; February 19, 1963 (age 62); Havana, Cuba
- Citizenship: United States
- Occupations: Stand-up comedian; actor; podcaster
- Years active: 1991–present
- Spouse: Terrie Clark (m. 2009)
- Children: 2

José Antonio Díaz (born February 19, 1963), also known as Joey "CoCo" Diaz, is a Cuban American stand-up comedian, actor, podcaster, and author. After pursuing stand-up comedy full time in 1991 in Colorado and Seattle, he moved to Los Angeles in 1995, where he began acting, securing various film and television roles including BASEketball, Analyze That, Taxi, Rules Don't Apply, ER, and Maron.

In 2010, Diaz started to gain widespread attention from his appearances on The Joe Rogan Experience podcast. From 2012 to 2020, he was the host of his own podcast, The Church of What's Happening Now with Lee Syatt, and has since hosted Uncle Joey's Joint.

== Early life ==
José Antonio Díaz was born in Havana, Cuba in 1963. He immigrated to the United States with his mother at age three, shortly after his father died. They lived on the Upper West Side of Manhattan, New York before moving to North Bergen, New Jersey, when he was 10, a town that he and his mother were the only Cuban American residents of at the time. Diaz's mother ran a bar in Union City, New Jersey and a successful numbers game operation in The Bronx. Diaz grew up Catholic and enjoyed learning stories about Francis of Assisi and Saint Michael as a child. He attended Public School 166 in Manhattan from kindergarten to second grade, Sacred Heart School for Boys in Kearny, New Jersey, from third to fifth grade, and then to McKinley School in North Bergen, where he was required to repeat seventh grade. He went to North Bergen High School, where he won performing arts awards and graduated from high school in 1982.

His mother died when he was sixteen, Diaz having found her dead in their home. He was taken in by four families around North Bergen during his teenage years – he later credited about twenty people who helped him – but his reckless nature and tendency to get into trouble caused him to move from one home to another. During that time, he began doing drugs and committing crimes. As he explained later on, his peers' sense of humor would greatly influence his eventual career in comedy, as would the comedy albums of Richard Pryor.

After his graduation from high school, Diaz moved to Colorado. However, his growing homesickness led him to return to New Jersey in 1984; he initially only intended to spend his twenty-first birthday there, but he ended up staying in the state for nearly eighteen months. He later called this time "the worst eighteen months of my life" and "the biggest mistake of my life", as his cocaine abuse worsened.

In June 1985, Diaz left New Jersey and returned to Colorado to study economics at the University of Colorado Boulder. He did not enjoy his time there and quit before taking up work selling roofing, which earned him money but failed to make him any happier.

Diaz was sent to prison in 1988, serving sixteen months of a four-year sentence after being found guilty of kidnapping and aggravated robbery. During his time in prison, he would perform stand-up routines for his fellow inmates during the weekly film screening event whenever the projector broke. It took Diaz a further three years to try stand-up professionally despite being often told of his talent; he later called his entry into the line of work "the last resort", as he had had many other jobs since his release from prison.

== Career ==
=== Stand-up comedy ===
After seeing the 1988 film Punchline, Diaz responded to an advertisement in a Denver newspaper for a $37 stand-up comedy course, and developed a blue comedy act. Before he did his first standup routine, he worked as a doorman at Wit's End.

Diaz performed his first routine on June 18, 1991, at Comedy Works in Denver, at a show headlined by Matt Woods. In April 1992, prior to his opening spot for Troy Baxley in Boulder, Colorado, Diaz took cocaine before going on stage and had a set that he described as "a disaster". He then ceased to take the substance before a performance. After developing his act, Diaz entered the Beck's Amateur Comedy Competition and won. He initially lost another competition until the winner was caught stealing jokes made famous by Jerry Seinfeld and Diaz was declared the winner. Diaz claimed Comedy Works manager Wende Curtis promised him a flight to Los Angeles for a showcase spot at The Comedy Store for owner Mitzi Shore, but never received either.

Diaz participated in a similar contest in Seattle, and finished sixth out of 40. In 1994, Diaz returned to Comedy Works and found Curtis had started a developmental program for comics which he joined. The process involved group writing sessions at Wood's home followed by sets in the club the same evening. At one point, Curtis banned Diaz from Comedy Works before it was lifted after they met years later.

In 1995, Diaz left Colorado for Los Angeles to try and make it as a successful stand-up comic. He used his divorce from his first wife, and the loss of contact with their daughter in the process, as motivation so he "could come back and make her (his daughter) proud". On November 4, 2007, Diaz appeared in North Bergen, New Jersey to help raise money for North Bergen High School's basketball team uniforms.

In April 2012, Diaz supported his Where I Got My Balls From documentary with the release of his stand-up special, It's Either You or the Priest. It went to No. 1 on the Billboard comedy charts in the UK and Canada, and No. 1 on iTunes. In December 2016, Diaz put out his first one-hour comedy special, Sociably Unacceptable, through the on-demand subscription services Seeso and Comedy Dynamics.

=== Film and television ===
In 1998, Diaz received a contract to star in a television pilot, playing a bartender in a series titled Bronx County, after a talent scout at CBS saw him perform comedy in Seattle. The offer was a total surprise to Diaz, who initially did not believe him until he saw the talent scout possess tickets to have him fly to Los Angeles for the shoot. The series was not picked up, but the opportunity led to more work for Diaz, including an offer in his first feature film, a referee in BASEketball (1998), and a part in the television series NYPD Blue. In 2000, Diaz was featured in You Got Nothin' (2003), an independent film. Parts of Analyze That (2002), which starred Diaz, were filmed in Hudson County, New Jersey. He said, "That was big for me, (to be) able to come home to film".

Diaz's profile increased with subsequent roles in Law & Order and his first major feature films, Spider-Man 2 (2004) and Taxi (2004). After, Diaz acted as an unlawful union organizer in The Longest Yard (2005). Diaz secured the role when he learned a remake of the original was in production, and had lunch with Chris Rock and Adam Sandler, during which Rock said he could land Diaz an audition. Diaz proceeded to assemble an audition tape: "I went out and got a football jersey two sizes too small, pants two sizes too small with my butt hanging out. I got kids' football shoulder pads and ran around the field with a cigar in my mouth". Three days after submitting the tape, Diaz landed the role; the producers liked the name Big Tony Tedesco, which Diaz named himself on the tape, and wrote it into the script. Originally the part had a mere three lines, but Diaz's tape got his part extended.

In 2005, Diaz expressed his wish to continue as a character actor, saying: "It's like a dream come true for me. ... I got my call and I have to make the most of it". Around that time, Diaz prepared his one-man comedy show Larceny & Laughter, which featured stories about his time growing up in North Bergen.

In 2007, Diaz appeared in four episodes of the television series My Name is Earl as Joey the Candy Bar Criminal. The show's producers wished to hire actors to play prisoners, and called Diaz after they saw him in The Longest Yard. Also in 2007, he hosted a series of humorous promotions for the Ultimate Fighting Championship as Joey Karate, giving karate instructions and comical predictions for upcoming fights. He regards his role in the 2009 television film The Dog Who Saved Christmas as a point of pride, as it allowed children in North Bergen to see him act. At the time of filming, Diaz weighed 390 lbs. By late 2009, he slimmed down to 295 lbs. In 2011, Diaz appeared in "Scarlet Ribbons", an episode of The Mentalist, and the film Bucky Larson: Born to Be a Star.

Around 2011, Diaz raised $1,400 from fans on Twitter and Facebook to finance a documentary about his upbringing in North Bergen, chronicling his life and how he was influenced by the various people who took care of him after his parents' death. Diaz contributed $2,600 to complete it and by mid-2012, Where I Got My Balls From was produced with his podcast co-host and producer Lee Syatt as director, who shot six hours of footage in total. Diaz made the film in tribute to those who helped him.

In 2013, Diaz appeared in "Sal's Pizza", the ninth episode of the comedy Brooklyn Nine-Nine. In the same year, he played Robert De Niro's coach in the feature film Grudge Match, which premiered on December 25. Diaz took his seventh-grade teacher to the premiere. In 2014, Diaz appeared in "White Truck", the twelfth episode of the second season of Maron. In 2017, he started work on a presentation based on one of his cats for Animal Planet.

=== Podcasts ===
In 2009, Diaz was introduced to comedian Felicia Michaels, who encouraged him to co-host a new comedy podcast. Beauty and Da Beast launched in August 2010. In one early episode, Diaz recalled a story about setting a prostitute's wig on fire when he was young. The weekend after it aired, attendance increased at Diaz's stand-up shows. The podcast ended in November 2012 after 113 episodes.

On September 2, 2012, Diaz launched his own podcast, The Church of What's Happening Now, which he co-hosted with producer and sidekick Lee Syatt. Diaz named it after a phrase which his former manager told him while he was working selling cars in Boulder. Episodes were released on various audio-only podcast platforms in addition to the audiovisual version on YouTube, where they garnered over half a million subscribers.

On October 5, 2020, Diaz launched a new podcast series, Uncle Joey's Joint after moving back to New Jersey from California. Diaz's former producer and sidekick Lee Syatt has been a recurring guest on the relaunched podcast but is no longer the show's producer.

== Personal life ==
Diaz has married twice. In 1991, he divorced his first wife, during which he lost his relationship with their daughter. On November 25, 2009, he and Terrie Clark married and they have a daughter.

In 2007, Diaz quit his longtime cocaine abuse. He later said, "It has to do with your peace of mind. For some people, it takes 10 years to acquire. It took me 30."

== Filmography ==
=== Films ===
Year	Title	Role	Notes
1998	BASEketball	Referee	
2002	You Got Nothin'	Charlie	
2002	American Gun	Gun Smuggler	
2002	Women vs. Men	Goon	TV movie
2002	Another Bobby O'Hara Story...	Tommy Brando	
2002	Analyze That	Ducks	
2003	The Mezzos	Joey Mezzo	Short
2003	Dickie Roberts: Former Child Star	Emmanuel's Entourage	
2004	Spider-Man 2	Train Passenger	
2004	Back by Midnight	Jojo	
2004	Taxi	Freddy	
2004	The Mafia Type	Big Al	Short
2005	Break a Leg	Large Producer	
2005	Accidentally on Purpose	Geraldo	Short
2005	The Longest Yard	Anthony "Big Tony" Cobianco	
2005	Endings	-	Video
2006	A Fine Line	Bruno Scalise	Short
2006	18 Fingers of Death!	Sammy Delassandro	Video
2007	Smiley Face	Security Guard	
2007	White Pants	Coach Larkin	Short
2007	A 'My Life at 26' Shortoon	Voice	Short
2008	One Hogan Place	Vinnie Books	Short
2008	Boiler Maker	Enzo	
2009	Redemption	Ritchie	Short
2009	The Deported	Sheriff	
2009	The Dog Who Saved Christmas	Stewey McMann	TV movie
2010	Stacy's Mom	Frankie the Teach	
2010	The Russian	Frank	Short
2010	Sinatra Club	Uncle Tony	
2010	The Dog Who Saved Christmas Vacation	Stewey McMann	TV movie
2011	Stonerville	Johnny Scarano	Video
2011	Bucky Larson: Born to Be a Star	German Guy/Distributor	
2011	The Dog Who Saved Halloween	Stewey McMann	TV movie
2011	My Dog's Christmas Miracle	TSA Officer	Video
2011	Outtakes	Joey	Short
2012	Leader of the Pack	Cicero	Short
2012	Jersey Shore Shark Attack	Richie	TV movie
2012	The Dog Who Saved the Holidays	Stewey McMann	TV movie
2013	Grudge Match	Mikey	
2014	The Dog Who Saved Easter	Stewey McMann	TV movie
2015	The Dog Who Saved Summer	Stewey McMann	TV movie
2016	The Bronx Bull	Mickey	
2016	Rules Don't Apply	Mobster	
2018	Camp Death III in 2D!	The Doomed	
2020	Grapefruit	Fairy Godfather (voice)	Short
2021	The Many Saints of Newark	Buddha	
2025	Guns Up	Charlie Brooks	

=== Television ===
Year	Title	Role	Notes
2000	ComicView	Himself	Episode: "ComicView: New Orleans Party Gras"
2001	18 Wheels of Justice	Bernie Corcoran	Episode: "Just South of El Paso"
2001	Mad TV	Salvatore 'Big Pussy' Bonpensiero	Episode: "Episode #6.24"
2002	NYPD Blue	Manny Mankiewicz	Episode: "Death by Cycle"
2003	Karen Sisco	Paulie	Episode: "Dear Derwood..."
2003	ER	Grocery Store Clerk	Episode: "The Greater Good"
2004	Cold Case	Ken Mazzacone	Episode: "Disco Inferno"
2004	Law & Order: Special Victims Unit	Elijah Coney	Episode: "Criminal"
2006	How I Met Your Mother	Angry New Yorker	Episode: "Where Were We?"
2006	Everybody Hates Chris	Store Owner	Episode: "Everybody Hates Promises"
2007	Murder 101	Herbie Saxe	Episode: "College Can Be Murder"
2007	My Name Is Earl	Joey the Prisoner	Recurring Cast: Season 3
2007	Frank TV	Defendant	Episode: "Ballpark Frank"
2007	1st Amendment Stand Up	Himself	Episode: "Joey Diaz/Melanie Comarcho/Lavell Crawford"
2008	Wizards of Waverly Place	Newsstand Guy	Episode: "The Supernatural"
2011	Supah Ninjas	Mr. Binzodo	Episode: "Kickbutt"
2011	The Mentalist	Gangster	Episode: "Scarlet Ribbons"
2011	Gabriel Iglesias Presents Stand-Up Revolution	Himself	Episode: "Rick Gutierrez/Thea Vidale/Joey CoCo Diaz"
2012	Kickin' It	Meatball King	Episode: "We Are Family"
2012	Childrens Hospital	Vito	Episode: "Wisedocs"
2013	Partners	Bob	Episode: "Two Nines and a Pair of Queens"
2013	Brooklyn Nine-Nine	Sal	Episode: "Sal's Pizza"
2013–16	This Is Not Happening	Himself	Recurring Guest
2014	TripTank	Cat Man (voice)	Episode: "Game Over" & "Ahhh, Serenity"
2014–16	Maron	Bobby Mendez	Guest Cast: Season 2 & 4
2015	Laugh Factory	Himself	Episode: "Joey Diaz: Catholic Guilt"
2017	The High Court	Guest Bailiff	Episode: "Who Needs a Bumper"
2017	Superior Donuts	Jake	Episode: "Secrets and Spies"
2018	The Degenerates	Himself	Episode: "Joey Diaz"
2018	I'm Dying Up Here	Taffy	Episode: "Gone with the Wind" & "The Mattresses"
2018	The Guest Book	Vinnie	Episode: "Finding Reality" & "Killer Party"
2020	The Cabin with Bert Kreischer	Himself	Episode: "Mind, Body and Soul"
2020	The Comedy Store	Himself	Recurring Guest
2020	The Midnight Gospel	Various Roles (voice)	Recurring Cast
2020	Big City Greens	John (voice)	Episode: "Friend Con/Flimflammed"
2022	WeCrashed	Detective Frank	Episode: "Masha Masha Masha"
2022	Sprung	Inmate Joey	Episode: "Episode 1 & 3"
2023	Law & Order: Special Victims Unit	Al	Episode: "Bad Things"
2025	Super Duper Bunny League	Frog Face (voice)	Episode: "Frog Face"

=== Comedy specials ===
Year	Title
2016	Socially Unacceptable

=== Documentaries ===
Year	Title
2002	The History of Choking
2006	Joe Rogan: Live
2006	Road Dog
2007	The Payaso Comedy Slam
2012	Where I Got My Balls From

=== Video games ===
Year	Title	Role
2016	Mafia III	Roman "The Butcher" Barbieri (voice)

=== Discography ===
Year	Title	Label
2003	The Blue Album	Laughing Hyena Records
