= A Golden Christmas =

2009 American television movie

- Written by: Jay Cipriani
- Directed by: John Murlowski
- Starring: Andrea Roth; Nicholas Brendon
- Country of origin: United States
- Original language: English

Production
- Running time: 95 minutes

Original release
- Network: Ion Television
- Release: December 13, 2009

A Golden Christmas is a 2009 Christmas romance movie starring Andrea Roth and Nicholas Brendon. The television movie premiered on December 13, 2009 as Ion Television's first original television movie. Plot: "A woman visits her parents for Christmas. Hearing that they've "sold" the house, she wants to buy it. At 9 years old, she had a BFF in the woods nearby named Han Solo. She and the buyer are single, divorced and have a child each. Is he her Han?"

== Cast ==
- Andrea Roth as Jessica
- Nicholas Brendon as Michael
- Bruce Davison as Rod, Jessica's father
- Alley Mills as Katherine, Jessica's mother
- Elisa Donovan as Anna, Jessica's sister
- Jason London as Mitch
- Daniel Zykov as Henry, Jessica's son
- Melody Hollis as Madeline, Michael's daughter
- Robert Seay as Chet, the realtor

== Series continuation ==
Two quasi-sequels were made:

- 3 Holiday Tails, a.k.a. A Golden Christmas 2: The Second Tail, a 2011 direct-to-DVD film, saw a young post-college couple reuniting due to "interference" by several golden retrievers, and a sub-plot having two pre-teens becoming good friends. Only Mills and Davison reprised their roles.
- A Golden Christmas 3, a.k.a. Home For Christmas, a TV movie released November 2012, featured childhood friends reuniting in love, again due to "magical" circumstance involving several golden retrievers. Alexandra Peters reprises her role from A Golden Christmas 2.

== Home media ==
The film was released on DVD on October 12, 2010.

== Reception ==
Common Sense Media rated the film 2 out of 5 stars.

Robert Lloyd of The Los Angeles Times said, "There is a dog in this one, too, along with Elisa Donovan, Bruce Davison and Alley Mills, and everyone does nice work."

== See also ==
- List of Christmas films
