= The Dog Who Saved Christmas =

2009 television film directed by Michael Feifer

- Genre: Comedy
- Screenplay by: Michael Ciminera & Richard Gnolfo
- Story by: Jeffrey Schenck; Michael Ciminera; Richard Gnolfo
- Directed by: Michael Feifer
- Starring: Mario Lopez; Dean Cain; Elisa Donovan; Sierra McCormick; Adrienne Barbeau; Gary Valentine; Joey Diaz
- Music by: Andres Boulton
- Country of origin: United States
- Original language: English

Production
- Producers: Michael Feifer; Jeffrey Schenck
- Cinematography: Hank Baumert Jr.
- Editors: Bryan Roberts; Matt Steinauer
- Running time: 88 minutes
- Production company: Barnholtz Entertainment

Original release
- Network: ABC Family
- Release: November 29, 2009

The Dog Who Saved Christmas is a 2009 American made-for-television Christmas comedy film starring Dean Cain, Gary Valentine and the voice of Mario Lopez. It was written by childhood friends Michael Ciminera and Richard Gnolfo. It premiered on ABC Family on November 29, 2009, during their Countdown to 25 Days of Christmas programming block. It was ranked as the number one cable program during its timeslot, and the number one cable film in the winter of the 2009 with 4.0 million viewers.

== Plot ==
Zeus, a Labrador Retriever and a former police dog, has lost his bark after his barking ended up blowing off a five-year investigation leading to his partner not being able to shoot straight again and ends up at the pound. He is adopted by George Bannister as both an early Christmas present and as a good guard dog for the house, but the mom is hesitant and didn't want a dog. The dog is left home alone on Christmas Eve when the family heads off to visit Grandma's house. A pair of burglars, Ted Stein and Stewey McMann break into the family home, and it is up to Zeus to save Christmas for his new family by setting up booby traps to stop them. Zeus soon gets caught by the burglars, they muzzle him and continue to rob the house. Zeus escapes while Ted and Stewey continue to rob the house. Zeus gets chased through the house by Ted and Stewey until Stewey accidentally pepper sprays himself. Ted then takes out a tranquilizer gun and tries to shoot Zeus but gets Stewey instead, knocking him out. Ted tries to escape the house (with Stewey who's still knocked out) but Zeus finishes them off for good by dropping a chandelier on them, knocking the two robbers out. The police come to arrest Ted and Stewey and Zeus finally barks. The family come back and see Ted and Stewey getting arrested and spend a Merry Christmas together.

== Cast ==
- Mario Lopez as Zeus
- Dean Cain as Ted Stein
- Elisa Donovan as Belinda Bannister
- Sierra McCormick as Kara Bannister
- Adrienne Barbeau as Cat Lady Mildred
- Mindy Sterling as Grandma Bannister
- Joey Diaz as Stewey McMann

It also features members of the production team in various supporting roles. Writers Richard Gnolfo and Michael Ciminera are credited as Policeman 1 & 2, while the director/producer Michael Feifer is credited as Police Officer 2.

== Reception ==
The Dog Who Saved Christmas was broadcast on Sunday, November 29, 2009, and was cable's number one program during its time period of 8:00pm–10:00pm with 4.0 million viewers. It was also ranked number one in scripted telecasts on cable during that Sunday, and became the season's number one cable film. It had a 14% increase in viewers from the same timeslot in the previous year.

Critics compared it to another Christmas dog themed TV movie of 2009, A Dog Named Christmas and cited influences from Home Alone and Look Who's Talking. A Dog Named Christmas was broadcast on the same night as The Dog Who Saved Christmas with the original timings overlapping by an hour. Critics rated A Dog Named Christmas as the superior film over The Dog Who Saved Christmas, but praised the performances of Adrienne Barbeau and Mindy Sterling.

The Dog Who Saved Christmas won several "Yulies" from the Popwatch column on Entertainment Weekly's website. The categories it won included "MVP: Most Valuable Pooch" and "Best Use of Dean Cain".

It was given the "Family Approved" seal by The Dove Foundation. Commonsense Media graded it as appropriate for ages 6 and up.

== Sequels ==
A sequel, The Dog Who Saved Christmas Vacation, aired on ABC Family in 2010.

A second sequel, The Dog Who Saved Halloween, was released directly to DVD in September 2011.

A third sequel, The Dog Who Saved the Holidays, was released directly to DVD on December 4, 2012.

A fourth sequel, The Dog Who Saved Easter, was released directly to DVD on April 8, 2014. It stars Dean Cain, Elisa Donovan, Beverley Mitchell, Mario Lopez, Patrick Muldoon, Matthew Lawrence and Catherine Hicks.

A fifth sequel, The Dog Who Saved Summer, was released directly to DVD on June 2, 2015. It stars Dean Cain, Gary Valentine, Elisa Donovan, Patrick Muldoon, Mario Lopez, Martin Kove, James Hong and William Zabka.

== Characters ==
- A dark grey cell indicates the character was not in the film.

| Character | Film | | | | | |
| Character | Christmas | Christmas Vacation | Halloween | Holidays | Easter | Summer |
|---|---|---|---|---|---|---|
| Ted Stein | Dean Cain | Dean Cain | Dean Cain | Dean Cain | Dean Cain | Dean Cain |
| George Bannister | Gary Valentine | Gary Valentine | Gary Valentine | Gary Valentine | | Gary Valentine |
| Zeus | Mario Lopez | Mario Lopez | Joey Lawrence | Joey Lawrence | Mario Lopez | Mario Lopez |
| Belinda Bannister | Elisa Donovan | Elisa Donovan | Elisa Donovan | Elisa Donovan | Elisa Donovan | Elisa Donovan |
| Ben Bannister | Charlie Stewart | Brennan Bailey | Brennan Bailey | Wyatt Griswold | Michael Leone | Cole Jensen |
| Kara Bannister | Sierra McCormick | Kayley Stallings | Kayley Stallings | Caitlin Carmichael | Caitlyn Leone | Francesca Capaldi |
| Stewey McMann | Joey "Coco" Diaz | Joey "Coco" Diaz | Joey "Coco" Diaz | Joey "Coco" Diaz | Joey "Coco" Diaz | Joey "Coco" Diaz |
| Annie | Mindy Sterling | Mindy Sterling | Mindy Sterling | Mindy Sterling | Mindy Sterling | Mindy Sterling |
| Mildrid | Adrienne Barbeau | Adrienne Barbeau | | | | |
| Bella | | Paris Hilton | | | | |
| Randy | | Casper Van Dien | | | | |
| Zack | | Michael William Arnold | | | | |
| London James | | Carlson Young | | | | |
| Sotherby | | David O'Donnell | | | | |
| Dottie | | Catherine Oxenberg | | | | |
| Medusa | | | Mayim Bialik | | | |
| Cornelias "Eli" Cole | | | Lance Henriksen | | | |
| Max | | | Curtis Armstrong | | | |
| Kent | | | Louis Mandylor | | | |
| Monique | | | Kristen Miller | | | |
| Marilyn | | | Christina DeRosa | | | Christina DeRosa |
| Eve | | | | Peyton List | | Kimberly A. Ray |
| Ned | | | | Michael Gross | | |
| Aunt Barbara | | | | Shelley Long | | |
| Tony Rowe | | | | Jack Scalia | | |
| Alice | | | | | Beverly Mitchell | |
| Fred Stein | | | | | Patrick Muldoon | Patrick Muldoon |
| Cressida | | | | | Catherine Hicks | |
| Gabrielle | | | | | Nicole Eggert | |
| Will | | | | | Matthew Lawrence | |
| Minnie | | | | | Madelyn Deutch | |
| Karen | | | | | Tiffany Thornton | |
| Mr. Lee | | | | | | James Hong |
| Vernon | | | | | | Martin Kove |
| Marsha | | | | | | Mackenzie Marsh |
| Apollo | | | | | | William Zabka |

== Crew ==
| Film title | Directed by | Executive Producers | Screenplay by | Music composed by | Edited by | Cinematography by |
|---|---|---|---|---|---|---|
| The Dog Who Saved Christmas | Michael Feifer | Jeffrey Schenck, Zelma Kiwi, and Barry Barnholtz | Michael Ciminera and Richard Gnolfo | Andres Boulton | Bryan Roberts, Matt Steinauer | Hank Baumert |
| The Dog Who Saved Christmas Vacation | Michael Feifer | Jeffrey Schenck, Zelma Kiwi, and Barry Barnholtz | Michael Ciminera, Richard Gnolfo, and Peter Sullivan | Andres Boulton and Chad Rehmann | Sean Olson | Jeffrey D. Smith |
| The Dog Who Saved Halloween | Peter Sullivan | Jeffrey Schenck, Zelma Kiwi, and Barry Barnholtz | Michael Ciminera, Richard Gnolfo, and Peter Sullivan | Chad Rehmann | Sean Olson | George Reasner |
| The Dog Who Saved the Holidays | Michael Feifer | Jeffrey Schenck, Zelma Kiwi, and Barry Barnholtz | Michael Ciminera and Richard Gnolfo | Andres Boulton and Chad Rehmann | Ely Mennin | Roberto Schein |
| The Dog Who Saved Easter | Sean Olson | Jeffrey Schenck, Zelma Kiwi, and Barry Barnholtz | Michael Ciminera, Richard Gnolfo, Sean Robert Olson, and Peter Sullivan | Jason Brandt | Sean Olson | Joseph M. Setele |
| The Dog Who Saved Summer | Sean Olson | Jeffrey Schenck, Zelma Kiwi, and Barry Barnholtz | Michael Ciminera, Richard Gnolfo, and Peter Sullivan | Jason Brandt | Sean Olson | Joseph M. Setele |

== See also ==
- List of Christmas films
