= Sabrina Down Under =

1999 television film by Kenneth R. Koch

- US DVD cover
- Based on: Sabrina the Teenage Witch by: Dan DeCarlo; George Gladir
- Written by: Daniel Berendsen
- Directed by: Kenneth R. Koch
- Starring: Melissa Joan Hart; Tara Charendoff; Scott Michaelson; Lindsay Sloane; Nick Bakay; Peter O'Brien; Rebecca Gibney
- Music by: Michel Colombier
- Country of origin: United States
- Original language: English

Production
- Producers: Melissa Joan Hart; Paula Hart
- Cinematography: Nino Martinetti
- Editor: Stuart Bass
- Running time: 84 minutes
- Production companies: Hartbreak Films; Viacom Productions

Original release
- Network: ABC
- Release: September 26, 1999

Related
- Sabrina Goes to Rome (1998)

Sabrina Down Under is a 1999 American television film produced for ABC, airing on September 26, 1999. It is a sequel to Sabrina Goes to Rome and is a companion to the Sabrina the Teenage Witch television series.

The film features only two characters from the television series: teenage witch Sabrina Spellman (played by Melissa Joan Hart), and talking cat Salem Saberhagen (voiced by Nick Bakay). Lindsay Sloane was also a regular actress in the television series, but plays a different character in this film. Tara Charendoff reprises her role as Gwen from Sabrina Goes to Rome. As the film is set in Australia, none of the scenes are filmed on the original set of the television series.

The film was directed by Kenneth R. Koch, who helped to produce Sabrina Goes to Rome. He also directed many episodes of the television series and was a prominent producer of the show.

Unlike Sabrina Goes to Rome, which is included in the season 7 DVD release of the Sabrina the Teenage Witch television series, Sabrina Down Under was not included in any of the season sets. It was later released on a stand-alone DVD on February 7, 2017. Prior to this, the film was released on VHS. It is available to stream on Hulu.

== Plot ==
Sabrina travels to Australia's Great Barrier Reef with Gwen, a fellow witch from England, for a week-long vacation where they try to help protect a hidden mermaid colony whose habitat is threatened by ocean pollution, and by local marine biologist Dr. Julian Martin, who is determined to find the colony as his claim to fame. While Sabrina finds a friendship with Barnaby, a "merman" from the mermaid colony, Salem the cat finds a possible romance with another witch-turned-into-a-cat named Hilary, but finds Sabrina's problems interfering with his plans. In order to prevent Julian from launching a search for the mermaid colony, she casts a spell to create a storm to keep him in port, which succeeds except that a lightning bolt knocks Sabrina unconscious, and when she comes to she learns she has lost her powers, at least temporarily.

== Cast ==
- Melissa Joan Hart as Sabrina Spellman, a teenage witch, visiting Australia to discover the Great Barrier Reef, and meet marine biologist Dr. Julian Martin. She discovers merman Barnaby, who she gives legs when she sees that he is ill.
- Tara Charendoff as Gwen, a British witch whose spells never go the way she plans. She and Sabrina go on holiday to Australia together. Gwen was introduced in Sabrina Goes to Rome.
- Scott Michaelson as Barnaby, a merman who turns into a human for 48 hours, thanks to Sabrina's magic.
- Lindsay Sloane as Fin, Barnaby's mermaid sister who initially despises humans.
- Nick Bakay as the voice of Salem Saberhagen, a 500-year-old witch, sentenced to spend 100 years as a cat as punishment for attempting to take over the world. While on his yearly vacation, he is surprised to find Sabrina there. He quickly falls for Hillary who is also a cat, however the two break up when her sentence is up and she is turned back into a woman. While taking a picture he discovered who had been polluting the ocean.
- Peter O'Brien as Dr. Julian Martin, a marine biologist who spends his time protecting the reef.
- Rebecca Gibney as Hilary Hexton, a witch imprisoned in the body of a cat. She begins to date Salem, however when she is turned back into a witch she says goodbye to him.
- Conrad Coleby as Jerome, a boy whom Gwen gets attracted to. He is cute, sweet and funny, but he is often hard to understand due to his use of Australian slang.
- Ben Lawson has a small appearance as an employee of the resort.

== Books ==
As part of the Sabrina the Teenage Witch book collection, a book titled Sabrina the Teenage Witch: Sabrina Down Under is available. The book is written by Ellen Titlebaum. It is unnumbered, as is the first film's book adaptation. The other books in the series are numbered in reading order.

== Differences between the film and the television series ==
- Lindsay Sloane, who played Valerie on the TV show, plays the mermaid Fin in this movie. The fact that the two characters resemble each other greatly is not mentioned (or apparently noticed) by Sabrina.

== Music ==
- The song "Beautiful Stranger" by Madonna is heard at the opening credits.
- Melissa Joan Hart's cover version of "Octopus's Garden" by The Beatles can be heard during the underwater scene.
- A cover version of "Livin' la Vida Loca" by Ricky Martin can be heard during the montage sequence.

On February 7, 2017, the film was released on DVD with changes to the musical score due to copyright issues.

== See also ==
- List of films about witchcraft
