= Kiss Me Again (2006 film) =

- Film poster
- Directed by: William Tyler Smith
- Written by: J.D Hoxter; William Tyler Smith
- Story by: William Tyler Smith; Bhargavi C. Mandava; Leonard Moreton
- Produced by: Jeff Mazzola; John Scaccia; Morris S. Levy
- Starring: Jeremy London; Katheryn Winnick; Elisa Donovan
- Cinematography: Christopher LaVasseur
- Edited by: Sam Wilson
- Music by: Isabel Dawson; Justin Samaha
- Distributed by: American World Pictures
- Release date: April 28, 2006
- Running time: 103 minutes
- Country: United States
- Language: English

Kiss Me Again is a 2006 romantic drama film directed and co-written by William Tyler Smith. It stars Jeremy London and Katheryn Winnick.

== Plot ==
Julian and Chalice, who have been married for three years, hit turmoil when Julian almost has an affair with a young Spanish student, Elena. Julian suggests, after learning from a neighbour engaged in such, that they look for another woman to join them and have a polygamous relationship. However, Julian has orchestrated affairs so that the woman happens to be Elena.

== Cast ==
- Jeremy London as Julian
- Katheryn Winnick as Chalice
- Elisa Donovan as Malika
- Mirelly Taylor as Elena

== Reception ==
Neil Genzlinger of The New York Times criticized the film as derivative and having poor performances. He said, "(Tyler) seems not to realize just how tired the notion of married folk deciding jointly to experiment with other partners is. The movie is so earnest that it's embarrassing."
