= Michelle Beaudoin =

Canadian actress

- Born: August 25, 1975 (age 50); Edmonton, Alberta, Canada
- Occupation: Actress
- Years active: 1993–2007

Michelle Beaudoin (born August 25, 1975) is a Canadian actress best known for her roles as Jenny Kelley in the sitcom Sabrina, the Teenage Witch and Penny Foster in the teen drama Madison.

== Career ==
Beaudoin played Sabrina's best friend Marnie in the Sabrina the Teenage Witch movie, and Sabrina's best friend Jenny Kelley in the first season of the series. Apart from Melissa Joan Hart, Beaudoin was the only other original cast member from the film that went on to the Sabrina the Teenage Witch television series. Beaudoin's character was removed from the series after only one season. The show's star Melissa Joan Hart said characters left because of backstage drama, such as audience reaction and payments for actors and the writers who created the characters.

Beaudoin had earlier starred as Penny Foster in the Canadian teen drama series Madison, which earned her a 1994 Gemini Awards nomination for "Best Performance in a Children's or Youth Program or Series".

Beaudoin has also guest-starred in many popular television series including Da Vinci's Inquest and The Outer Limits, Neon Rider, and several independent films such as Waydowntown, Ginger Snaps 2: Unleashed, Sweetwater and Sunset Strip.

== Filmography ==
Film and television
Year	Title	Role	Notes
1993	Neon Rider	Sherry	Episode: "Extreme Prejudice"
1993	Family of Strangers	Young Sue	TV movie
1993–1995	Madison	Penny Foster	24 episodes
1995	Live Bait	Celia Watson	
1995	Bad Company	Wanda	
1995	She Stood Alone: The Tailhook Scandal	Tawney	TV movie
1995	Mixed Blessings	Jane	TV movie
1995	The Outer Limits	Jessie Wells	Episode: "White Light Fever"
1996	Sabrina the Teenage Witch	Marnie Littlefield	TV movie
1996	Poltergeist: The Legacy	Wendy Barton	Episode: "Ghost in the Road"
1996–1997	Sabrina, the Teenage Witch	Jennifer 'Jenny' Kelley	Season 1 (main role)
1997	Michael Hayes		Episode: "Retribution"
1999	Sweetwater	Rita Spiridakis	TV movie
1999	Escape Velocity	Ronnie	
2000	Sunset Strip	Girl with Frizzy Red Hair	
2000	Waydowntown	Anise	
2001	The Outer Limits	Beth	Episode: "A New Life"
2001	Da Vinci's Inquest	Cecilia Briaro	Episode: "You See How It Begins?"
2004	Da Vinci's Inquest	Lena Whelan	Episode: "Can Bend, But I Won't Break"
2004	Ginger Snaps 2: Unleashed	Winnie	
2005	Cold Squad	Lindsay Moss	Episode: "The Filth: Part 1"; Episode: "And the Fury: Part 2"

== Awards and nominations ==
Year	Award	Category	Title of work	Result
1994	Gemini Award	Best Performance in a Children's or Youth Program or Series	Madison (for episode #1.2: "The Firefighter")	Nominated
