= Sabrina Goes to Rome =

1998 television film by Tibor Takács

- Promotional poster
- Based on: Sabrina the Teenage Witch by: Dan DeCarlo; George Gladir
- Written by: Daniel Berendsen
- Directed by: Tibor Takács
- Starring: Melissa Joan Hart; Eddie Mills; Tara Charendoff; James Fields; Eric Alexander; Nick Bakay
- Music by: Danny Lux
- Country of origin: United States
- Original language: English

Production
- Producers: Melissa Joan Hart; Paula Hart; Ovidio G. Assonitis; Kenneth R. Koch
- Cinematography: Adolfo Bartoli
- Editor: Marcus Manton
- Running time: 84 minutes
- Production companies: Hartbreak Films; Viacom Productions

Original release
- Network: ABC
- Release: October 4, 1998

Related
- Sabrina the Teenage Witch (1996); Sabrina Down Under (1999)

Sabrina Goes to Rome is a 1998 American television film produced for ABC, airing on October 4, 1998. The film is a part of the Sabrina the Teenage Witch television series franchise and is the second television film made for the series following the 1996 Sabrina the Teenage Witch film, which was produced before the television series went into production.

The film features only two main characters from the television series, the protagonist Sabrina Spellman (played by Melissa Joan Hart), and other main character Salem Saberhagen (voiced by Nick Bakay). The film introduces the character of Gwen (played by Tara Charendoff), a British witch, whom Sabrina meets in Rome. As the film is set in Rome, none of the scenes are set on the original set of the television series.

The film was directed by Tibor Takács, the director of the original Sabrina the Teenage Witch film. Takács also directed an episode of the television series.

Due to the success of Sabrina Goes to Rome, ABC produced a sequel titled Sabrina Down Under. This film again only included Sabrina and Salem from the television series. Tara Charendoff reprised her role of Gwen for the second film.

The film is included in the season 7 DVD release of the Sabrina the Teenage Witch television series.

== Plot ==
Sabrina has received a letter from her father asking her to try and open a mysterious antique gold locket which her Aunt Sophia is trapped inside, however she has only two weeks to do so or the magic will fade and Aunt Sophia will be lost forever. The only clue she has is that "the secret to the locket lies in Rome" so Sabrina heads for Italy and the Eternal City of Rome, for what was supposed to be "two cat-less weeks" to herself. Unknown to her she is accompanied by Salem who has stowed away in her backpack. Sabrina finds an unexpected roommate: Gwen, a British witch with a talking guinea pig named Stonehenge (nicknamed "Stony"). At the inn where she is staying, Sabrina learns that her Aunt Sophia was banished and trapped in the locket because she fell in love with a mortal who betrayed her and revealed to a friend that she was a witch. Later while traveling the city, she meets Paul, the gorgeous American photographer who catches her before she falls into the famous Trevi Fountain. Together, Sabrina and Gwen set out to solve the mystery of the locket. When Paul and his friend Travis witness Sabrina doing magic, while turning a walking statue to stone (that Gwen brought to life by accident) they come up with an idea to sell the story. In the end Paul doesn't betray Sabrina, which sets Aunt Sophia free, as the locket says "Trust your heart".

== Cast ==
- Melissa Joan Hart as Sabrina Spellman, a teenage witch, visiting Rome to unlock the mystery of her aunt Sophia’s locket to stop Sophia being lost forever.(Aunt Sophia looks just like Sabrina hinting that Melissa Joan Hart acted as Aunt Sophia in her few appearances) She has to learn to trust her heart when she finds out Paul’s secret.
- Eddie Mills as Paul, an adopted American photographer, who saves Sabrina from falling into the famous Trevi Fountain. Paul finds out that Sabrina is a witch, and he tries to get evidence on video camera, so that he can sell the story along with Travis. After Sabrina reunites him with his real family in Italy, he doesn’t want to expose her and destroys the video evidence.
- Tara Charendoff as Gwen, a British witch whose spells never go the way she plans. She helps Sabrina unlock the locket. She has a crush on Alberto, who she accidentally turns into a pigeon. To change him back she has to kiss him, however there is no way of her knowing which pigeon he is.
- James Fields as Travis, a friend of Paul's who intends to gather evidence to expose Sabrina as a witch and become rich.
- Eric Alexander as Alberto, a handsome young man who Gwen accidentally turns into a pigeon. Determined to turn him back into a human, Gwen ends up randomly kissing pigeons in hopes of changing Alberto back. When she is about to give up, she relents on kissing a pigeon who keeps visiting her and Alberto is restored to human form.
- Nick Bakay as the voice of Salem Saberhagen, a 500-year-old witch, sentenced to spend 100 years as a cat as punishment for attempting to take over the world. Salem stows away in Sabrina’s backpack and once in Rome, befriends Stony to gain free food from outdoor eateries, as people don’t take kindly to finding a guinea pig in their food.
- Richard Steven Horvitz as the voice of Stonehenge, aka Stoney, Gwen's talking guinea pig.

== Books ==
As part of the Sabrina the Teenage Witch book collection, a book titled Sabrina the Teenage Witch: Sabrina Goes to Rome is available. The book is credited to author Mel Odom and the film's screenwriter Daniel Berendsen. It is unnumbered, as is the second film's book adaptation. The other books in the series are numbered in reading order. The book adds in a subplot not shown in the film - featuring Sabrina's aunts back in Westbridge spying on Harvey and a mysterious girl named Tish. This also references previous continuity from the TV series, where Hilda has brought back the three butlers the aunts used to employ (as shown in season 1's "The Great Mistake").

As part of the Sabrina, the Teenage Witch: Salem's Tails book collection, a book titled Salem's Tails: Salem Goes to Rome is available. The book tells Salem's tale of his trip to Rome. This book is also unnumbered.

== Music ==
- The song heard in the opening credits is "Sky Fits Heaven" by Madonna.
- Other songs featured in the movie include, "Crush" by Jennifer Paige.
- The song heard at the ending credits is "Gassenhauer" by Carl Orff.

== See also ==
- List of films about witchcraft
