= Melissa Joan Hart =

American actress, director and producer (born 1976)

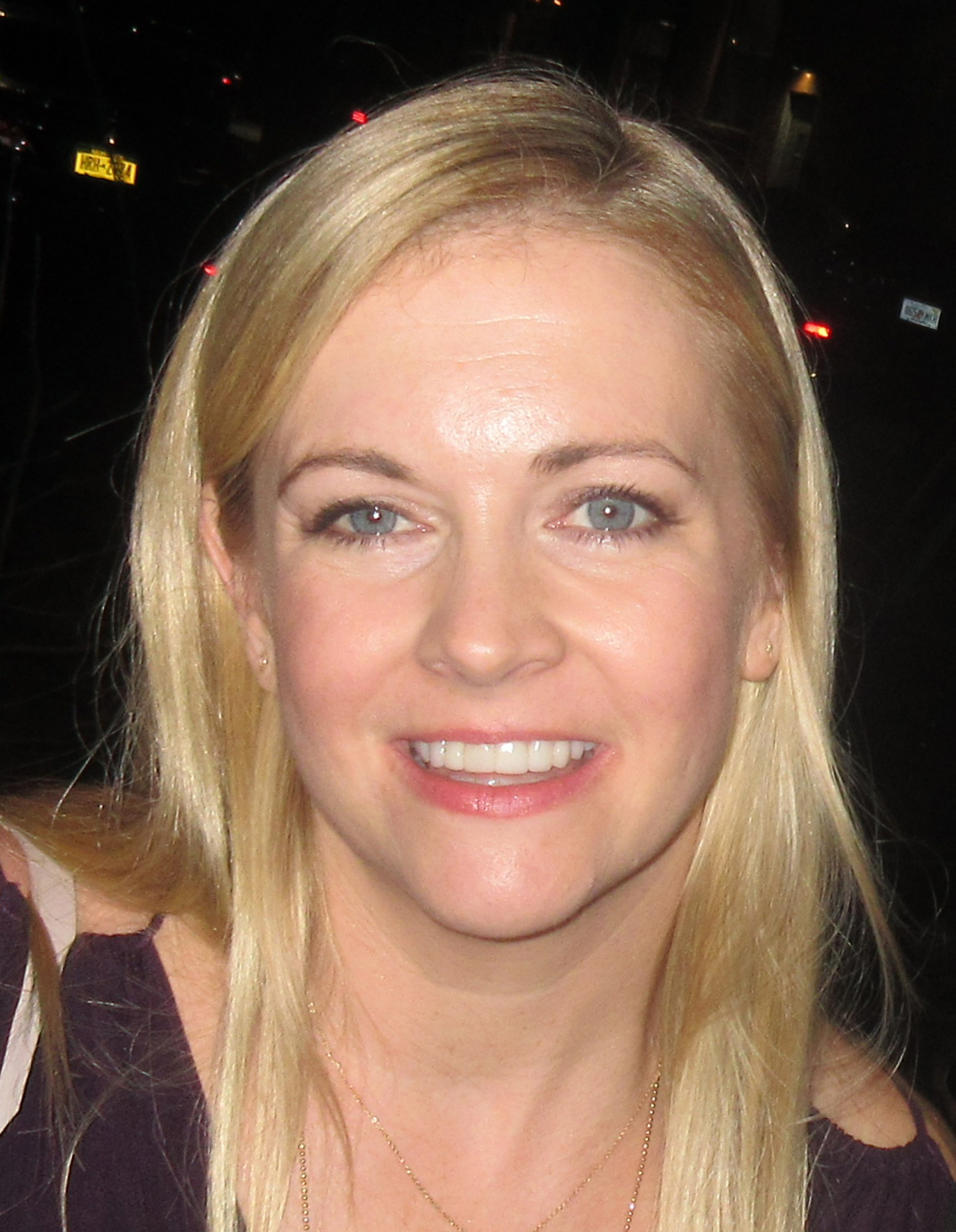
- Hart in September 2017
- Born: April 18, 1976 (age 50); Smithtown, New York, U.S.
- Occupations: Actress; director; producer
- Years active: 1985–present
- Spouse: Mark Wilkerson (m. 2003)
- Children: 3
- Mother: Paula Hart
- Relatives: Emily Hart (sister)

Melissa Joan Hart (born April 18, 1976) is an American actress, director and producer. She had starring roles as the title characters in the sitcoms Clarissa Explains It All, Sabrina the Teenage Witch, and Melissa & Joey, and she appeared as Liz in No Good Nick. She has also appeared in the films Drive Me Crazy (1999), Nine Dead (2009), and God's Not Dead 2 (2016).

== Early life ==
Hart was born in Smithtown, New York, the first child of Paula Hart (née Voje), a producer and talent manager, and William Hart, a carpenter, shellfish purveyor, oyster hatchery worker, and entrepreneur. Her maternal grandfather, Stanley John Voje, was a Navy veteran and Catholic.

Hart's parents had four other children after Melissa: Trisha, Elizabeth, Brian, and Emily, who are all in acting. Her parents divorced in the early 1990s, and she moved with her mother and siblings to New York City. In 1994, her mother married television executive Leslie Gilliams, who is best known for his appearance on Season 5 of MasterChef in 2014, when he finished in 3rd place. Hart has three half-sisters.

== Career ==
=== Early career ===
Hart's career began at age four when she made a television commercial for a bathtub doll called Splashy. From then on, she appeared regularly in commercials, making 25 of them before the age of five. Other early television work included a small role in the miniseries Kane & Abel in 1985, a guest-starring role in an episode of The Equalizer in 1986, and a starring role alongside Katherine Helmond in the Emmy Award-winning television film Christmas Snow, also in 1986. She appeared on the April 22, 1986, episode of the NBC daytime soap opera Another World. She also auditioned for the lead role Jamie Lloyd in Halloween 4: The Return of Michael Myers, losing the role to Danielle Harris.

In 1989, she became an understudy in a Broadway production of The Crucible starring Martin Sheen. That same year, she appeared in an off-Broadway production of Beside Herself with William Hurt and Calista Flockhart.

=== 1991–1994: Clarissa Explains It All ===
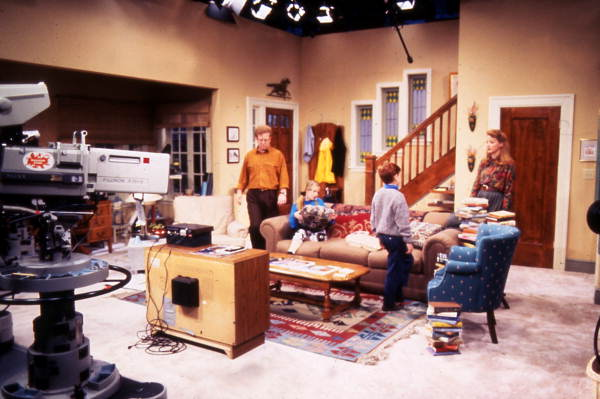
Hart on the set of Clarissa Explains It All at Nickelodeon Studios in 1991

In 1991, Hart landed the starring role on the Nickelodeon series Clarissa Explains It All, a comedy about a teenaged girl in everyday situations, which was successful during its four-year run. The show brought her four consecutive Young Artist Award nominations, winning three. Her role in the series also led to her starring in the FMV video game Nickelodeon's Director's Lab as a tour guide who takes the player around a film studio.

Initially, after first being recognized in public, Hart felt embarrassed to be acting in a children's show while being a teenager. Nevertheless, she was enthusiastic about the role, and "all [she] hoped for that [she] would get to do it for a while."

Hart also recorded two albums as Clarissa: This Is What 'Na Na' Means and a recording of Peter and the Wolf.

In 1995, a year after the end of Clarissa Explains It All, Hart filmed a pilot episode for a spin-off show featuring a college-aged Clarissa explaining it all about her foray into the professional world as an intern at a newspaper. As its musical theme, the show featured a slow, jazz version of its predecessor's theme song, and also starred Robert Klein as her boss.

Hart appeared on Nickelodeon's anthology show Are You Afraid of the Dark?, in the Season 2 episode "The Tale of the Frozen Ghost" (1993).

=== 1996–2003: Sabrina the Teenage Witch ===
After the television series ended, Hart attended New York University. However, she dropped out after she earned the title role for the 1996 television film Sabrina the Teenage Witch, which was followed by the television series of the same name, which lasted seven seasons on ABC (four seasons) and The WB (three seasons). She later collaborated on an animated version that featured Hart voicing the two aunts Hilda and Zelda with Hart's younger sister Emily starring in the title role. She also guest-starred on the series Touched by an Angel and starred in several television films. She guest starred on the Boy Meets World episode "Witches of Pennbrook" as her character Sabrina Spellman; the episode also guest starred Hart's closest friend Candace Cameron Bure as a witch named Millie.

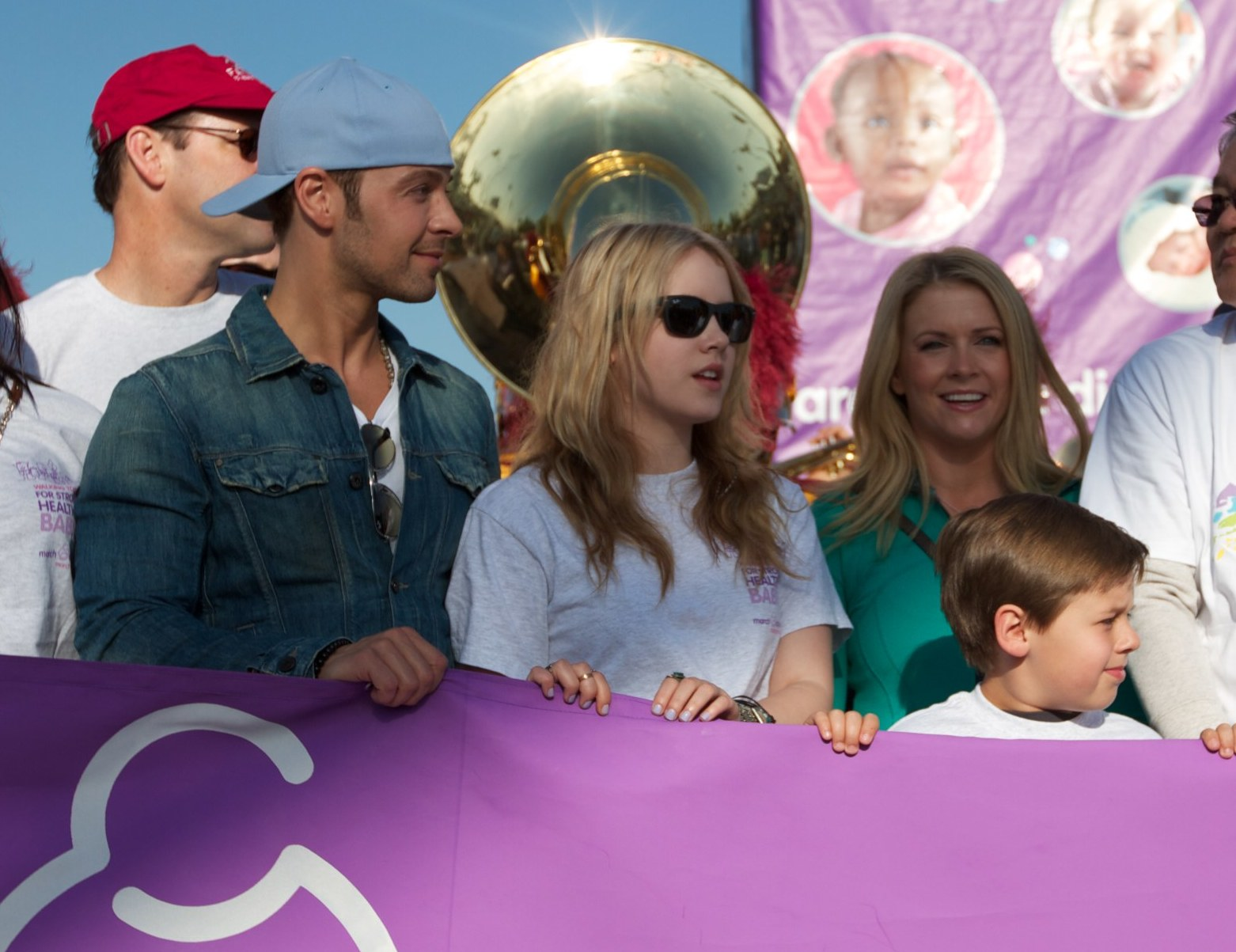
Hart participates in a 2011 March of Dimes event with her Melissa & Joey co-stars Joey Lawrence and Taylor Spreitler.

In 1998, Hart had a small role in the film Can't Hardly Wait; shortly afterwards Hart began working on a theatrical film project titled Next to You, in which she acted alongside Adrian Grenier. Britney Spears released a remix of her song "(You Drive Me) Crazy" to promote the film's soundtrack. To capitalize on the song's success as a top-ten hit, the name of the film was changed to Drive Me Crazy. To promote the film, both Hart and Grenier appeared in the song's music video. Around the same time, Spears made a guest appearance as herself on Sabrina, in the season four episode "No Place Like Home".

Coinciding with the release of Drive Me Crazy, Hart appeared wearing lingerie on the cover of Maxim magazine's October 1999 issue, as well as in a photo shoot and an accompanying article, which resulted in an attempt by the publisher of the Sabrina comic book series to sue her for breach of contract. Hart continued her acting career, starring in the film Rent Control, which aired in 2005 on the ABC Family cable network. Hart also continued to star on Sabrina, the Teenage Witch until 2003. Hart was also a primary voice-actress on Sabrina: The Animated Series, which ran for 65 episodes in 1999 on ABC and UPN.

In 1999, Hart made her directorial debut in an episode of Disney Channel's So Weird called "Snapshot" which guest-starred her sister Emily. Hart directed an episode of Nickelodeon's Taina in 2001. In 2001 and 2002, she directed six episodes of Sabrina.

=== 2004–2010: Post-Sabrina ===
After Sabrina ended in 2003 after seven seasons, Hart directed her first film, a 15-minute live-action short film called Mute (2005), starring her sister Emily. In 2007, Hart guest-starred on an episode of Law & Order: Special Victims Unit titled "Impulsive" as a teacher accused of statutory rape. In late 2007, she directed the "Anger Cage" video for her husband Mark Wilkerson's band Course of Nature. She also starred in the ABC Family film Holiday in Handcuffs, opposite Mario Lopez. The film premiered on December 9, 2007, and was the highest rated program in the history of the network, with 6.7 million viewers. Hart followed this with another ABC Family film with a similar premise, My Fake Fiancé, in 2009.

It was announced on August 17, 2009, that she would compete in season nine of Dancing with the Stars. Hart was paired up with two-time reigning champion, Mark Ballas. She was eliminated from the competition in week six out of a possible ten. In 2010, Hart starred as Kelley in the horror thriller film Nine Dead.

=== 2010–2015: Melissa & Joey ===
In 2010, Hart returned to a new weekly television series, starring with Joey Lawrence in the ABC Family sitcom Melissa & Joey. In the series Hart plays a woman who hires Lawrence as a nanny to help care for her incarcerated sister's children. In the second season, she occupied the director's chair for an episode, for the first time since Sabrina.

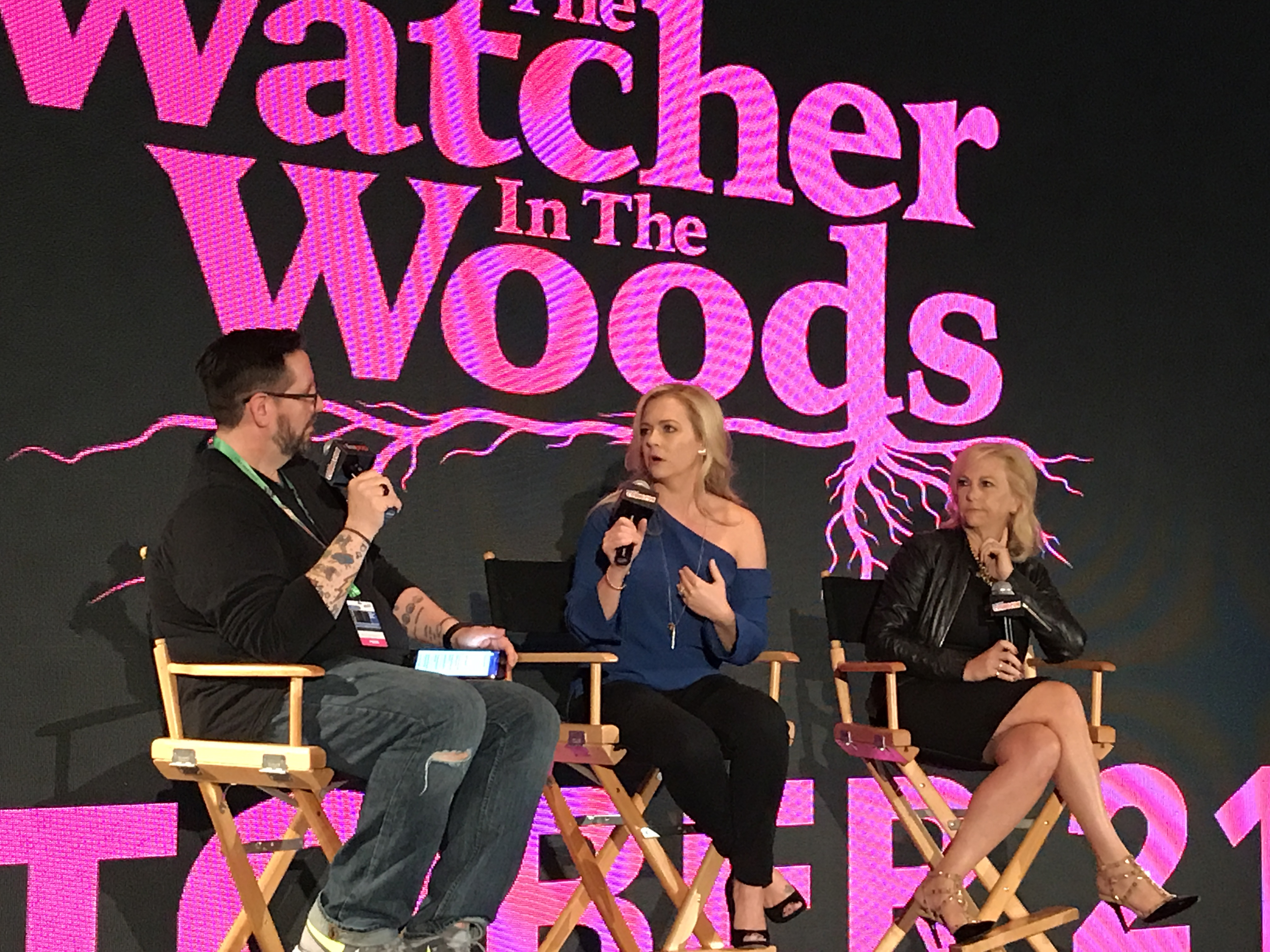
Hart (center) with her mother (right) and moderator Damian Holbrook (left) promoting The Watcher in the Woods at the 2017 New York Comic Con

Hart joined the cast of an off-Broadway production of Love, Loss, and What I Wore for a four-week run that started in March 2010 and ended April 25, 2010.

In March 2010, Hart took part in an ad campaign for Gain detergent with Sabrina, the Teenage Witch co-star and friend Soleil Moon Frye.

On November 22, 2010, Hart participated as a presenter in the International Emmy Awards.

In June 2012, St. Martin's Press announced that it had made a deal with Hart to publish her memoir Melissa Explains It All: Tales from My Abnormally Normal Life in the fall of 2013. In the memoir, Hart wrote about growing up, being a child actor and her rise to fame, her rebellious teen years, and her efforts to balance a career as an adult with motherhood and family life.

In 2013, Hart attempted to use crowdfunding (via Kickstarter) to fund a romantic comedy film to be titled Darci's Walk of Shame, but was only able to garner $51,605, or just 2.6% of the expected $2 million goal. Ultimately, the idea was scrapped.

Melissa & Joey concluded in August 2015 after 4 seasons and 104 episodes.

=== 2016–present: Recent work ===
In 2016, Hart starred as the lead, Grace Wesley, in the film God's Not Dead 2.

In 2018, Hart was cast as Liz in the Netflix comedy series No Good Nick. The series premiered on April 15, 2019. She directed one episode from The Goldbergs, "Hail Barry", and the Young Sheldon episode "Cowboy Aerobics and 473 Grease-Free Bolts". Hart also made her return to Nickelodeon 25 years after the end of Clarissa Explains It All when she joined the voice cast of The Casagrandes, a spinoff of The Loud House, portraying Becca Chang opposite of Ken Jeong as Stanley Chang.

In 2022, Hart starred in the Lifetime film Dirty Little Secret. It is inspired by true events and the book Dirty Little Secrets by C.J. Omolulu.

In January 2022, Hart began hosting a podcast titled What Women Binge starring her and her friend Amanda Lee. The podcast was discontinued in May 2024.

In 2023, Hart competed in season nine of The Masked Singer as "Lamp". She was eliminated in "Masked Singer in Space" alongside Alicia Witt as "Dandelion". Also in 2023, Hart starred in the Lifetime film Would You Kill for Me? The Mary Bailey Story as Mary Bailey's grandmother Ella.

In 2024, Hart starred in the Lifetime film The Bad Guardian, which was based on different accounts of elder abuse.

In 2025, Hart starred in the Lifetime film Killing the Competition. It is inspired by actual events of overparenting gone wrong, with Hart portraying a helicopter mother named Elizabeth Fenwick who plots to kidnap the lead dancer and her mother when her daughter gets cut from the school's dance team.

In 2026, Hart competed in the HGTV series Totally 90s House while being partnered with fellow actors Matthew Lawrence and Keshia Knight Pulliam. She left in the middle of the competition and chose her Melissa & Joey co-star, Joey Lawrence, as her replacement.

== Business ventures ==
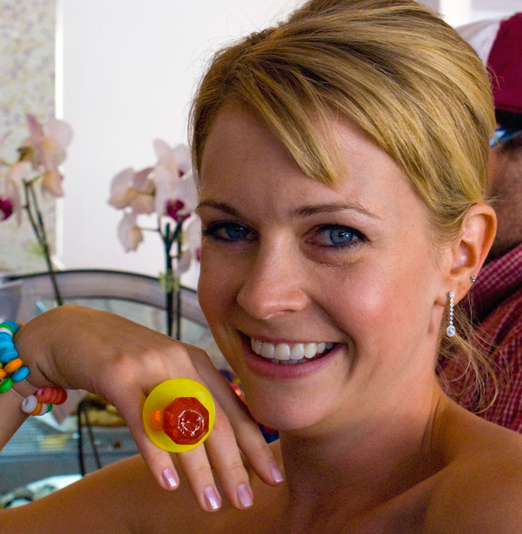
Hart at her SweetHarts Candy Shop opening day, May 30, 2009

In May 2009, Hart opened a candy shop called SweetHarts in Sherman Oaks, California. Hart commented that it had been her "childhood dream" to own a candy shop. SweetHarts closed in December 2011 due to a lawsuit by a former employee alleging wrongful termination and racial discrimination, as well as other issues. Hart denied all of the employee's claims, and the case was dismissed in 2012. SweetHarts later reopened with new owners before closing permanently in 2015.

In 2015, Hart and her husband started their own fashion line called King of Harts.

== Personal life ==
On July 19, 2003, Hart married musician Mark Wilkerson, having met him at the Kentucky Derby in May 2002. The preparations for the ceremony, which took place in Florence, Italy, were documented in a television miniseries titled Tying the Knot, produced by Hart's production company Hartbreak Films and aired on ABC Family. Hart and Wilkerson have three sons. They lived in Westport, Connecticut, until 2019, when they moved to Lake Tahoe and then in 2020, they moved to Nashville.

Hart and Wilkerson were featured in People magazine's April 7, 2008 issue, introducing their second son. Hart wrote a diary, including video entries, to document potty training her oldest son for Huggies Pull-Ups brand diapers.

Hart was brought up a Catholic, but her and her family are now Presbyterians. In an interview, she stated that they attend church every Sunday and pray every night and before every meal.

Hart was near The Covenant School in Nashville when a mass shooting occurred there in March 2023 and helped escort some of the fleeing children to safety. She later recounted the experience on NewsNation and her social media accounts, while noting that she and her children were also in proximity to the Sandy Hook Elementary School shooting in 2012.

Hart has expressed her support for some Republican candidates, such as voting for Bob Dole during the 1996 election. On November 5, 2012, the day before that year's Election Day, she tweeted that she was endorsing Mitt Romney for president. Hart has expressed support for increased gun control, marching in a Moms Demand Action demonstration in Brooklyn in May 2016. On August 16, 2016, in the run-up to that year's presidential election, she donated to Libertarian Party candidate Gary Johnson's campaign. On August 28, 2016, she joined Johnson's campaign as its Connecticut chairperson. On August 21, 2023, she marched with Moms Demand Action in Nashville.

On October 17, 2021, she became the first celebrity to win the $1 million top prize for her charity, Youth Villages, on Celebrity Wheel of Fortune and the fourth overall million-dollar winner on Wheel of Fortune.

== Filmography ==
=== Television ===
Year	Title	Role	Notes
1985	ABC Weekend Special	Cindy	Episode: "The Adventures of Con Sawyer and Hucklemary Finn"
1985	Kane & Abel	Florentyna Rosnovski (age 7)	Credited as Melissa Hart
1986	The Equalizer	Laura Moore	Episode: "Torn" (credited as Melissa Hart)
1986	Another World	Roller-Skater	Episode dated April 22
1986	Christmas Snow	Amy	Television film
1991–1994	Clarissa Explains It All	Clarissa Darling	Lead role
1992	Nick Arcade	Herself	Episode: "Clarissa Explains It All Celebrity Special"
1993	Are You Afraid of the Dark?	Daphne	Episode: "The Tale of the Frozen Ghost"
1995	Clarissa	Clarissa Darling	Unsold pilot (also known as Clarissa Now) shown during Nickelodeon's Big Help-A-Thon
1995	Touched by an Angel	Claire Latham	Episode: "Angels on the Air"
1995	Family Reunion: A Relative Nightmare	Samantha	Television film
1996	Weinerville	Herself; Subway Passenger	Episodes: "The Weinerville Election Special" "The Weinerville New Years Special: Lost In The Big Apple"
1996	Sabrina the Teenage Witch	Sabrina Spellman	Television film; served as the pilot for the TV series
1996	Twisted Desire	Jennifer Stanton	Television film
1996–2003	Sabrina the Teenage Witch	Sabrina Spellman	Lead role; also producer, director
1997	Clueless	Sabrina Spellman	Episode: "Mr. Wright"
1997	Boy Meets World	Sabrina Spellman	Episode: "The Witches of Pennbrook"
1997	You Wish	Sabrina Spellman	Episode: "Genie Without a Cause"
1997	Teen Angel	Sabrina Spellman	Episode: "One Dog Night"
1997	The Right Connections	Melanie Cambridge	Television film
1997	Two Came Back	Susan Clarkson	Television film
1997–1998	Moesha	Haley Dillard	Recurring role, later recast to Dru Mouser
1998	The Zig and Zag Show	Herself	1 episode
1998	Silencing Mary	Mary Stuartson	Television film
1998	Superman: The Animated Series	Saturn Girl (voice)	Episode: "New Kids in Town"
1998	Sabrina Goes to Rome	Sabrina Spellman, Sophia	Television film
1999	That '70s Show	Mary	Episode: "Eric Gets Suspended"
1999	Sabrina: The Animated Series	Hilda Spellman, Zelda Spellman (voice)	Main role
1999	Love, American Style	Annabelle	Television film
1999	Sabrina Down Under	Sabrina Spellman	Television film
2000	Just Shoot Me!	Krissy	Episode: "Fast Times at Finchmont High"
2002	Rent Control	Holly Washburn	Television film
2003	The Jamie Kennedy Experiment	Herself	Episode dated March 20
2004	North Shore	Herself	Episode: "Secret Service"
2005	Justice League Unlimited	Delia and Deidre Dennis / Dee Dee (voice)	Episode: "The Once and Future Thing, Part Two: Time, Warped"
2005, 2012	Robot Chicken	Emily the Spy, Hilda Spellman, Sabrina Spellman (voice)	2 episodes
2006	Dirtbags	Kate	Television film
2007	Law & Order: Special Victims Unit	Sarah Trent	Episode: "Impulsive"
2007	Holiday in Handcuffs	Trudy Chandler	Television film
2008	Whispers and Lies AKA Secrets of Pine Cove	Jill Roperson	Television film
2009	Dancing with the Stars	Herself	Season 9 contestant
2009	My Fake Fiancé	Jennifer	Television film
2010–2015	Melissa & Joey	Mel Burke	Lead role (104 episodes); also executive producer, director
2010	When I Was 17	Herself	
2014	Motor City Masters	Herself/guest judge	Episode: "The Mother of All Design Challenges"
2015	The Mysteries of Laura	K.C. Moss	Episode: "The Mystery of the Deceased Documentarian"
2016	Celebrity Family Feud	Herself	Episode: "Melissa Joan Hart vs. Paul Sorvino"
2016	Broadcasting Christmas	Emily Morgan	Television film
2017	A Very Merry Toy Store	Connie Forester	Television film
2017	The Watcher in the Woods		Television film
2017–2018	Pickle and Peanut	Herself	2 episodes
2018	Bobcat Goldthwait's Misfits & Monsters	Mom	Episode: "The Goatman Cometh"
2018	A Very Nutty Christmas	Kate Holiday	Television film
2019	No Good Nick	Liz	Main role
2019	The Loud House	Becca Chang (voice)	3 episodes
2019	The Goldbergs	Elaine	Episode: "Angst-Giving"
2019	Christmas Reservations	Holly Anderson	Television film
2019–2022	The Casagrandes	Becca Chang (voice)	Recurring role, 7 episodes
2020	Dear Christmas	Natalie	Television film
2021	Hell's Kitchen	Herself	Chef's table guest diner for the red team; episode: "More Than a Sticky Situation"
2021	Celebrity Wheel of Fortune	Herself	Episode: "Melissa Joan Hart, Tituss Burgess and Lacey Chabert" Won $1,000,000 for Youth Villages
2021	Mistletoe in Montana	Merry	Television film
2022	Dirty Little Secret	Joanna	Television film
2023	The Masked Singer	Herself/Lamp	Season 9 contestant
2023	Would You Kill for Me? The Mary Bailey Story	Ella	Television film
2024	The Bad Guardian	Leigh Delgado	Television film
2025	Killing the Competition	Elizabeth Fenwick	Television film
2026	Totally 90s House	Herself	Reality show contestant

=== Film ===
Year	Title	Role	Notes
1998	Can't Hardly Wait	Vicki, Yearbook Girl	Uncredited
1998	The Emperor's New Clothes: An All-Star Illustrated Retelling of the Classic Fairy Tale	The Imperial Princess	Voice
1999	Drive Me Crazy	Nicole Maris	
2000	Santa Mouse and the Ratdeer	Molly	Voice
2000	The Specials	Sunlight Grrrll	
2000	Batman Beyond: Return of the Joker	Delia & Deidre Dennis / Dee Dee	Voice
2001	Backflash	C.J.	Direct-to-video
2001	Recess: School's Out	Becky Detweiller	Voice
2001	The Voyage to Atlantis: The Lost Empire	Herself	Short; spinoff of Atlantis: The Lost Empire
2001	Not Another Teen Movie	Slow Clapper's Instructor/Herself	Uncredited
2002	Hold On	Herself	Short film
2002	Jesus, Mary and Joey	Jackie	
2009	Nine Dead	Kelly Murphy	
2011	Satin	Lauren Wells	
2014	Santa Con	Rose DeMarco	
2016	God's Not Dead 2	Grace Wesley	
2017	CarGo	Cabigail	Voice
2025	A Merry Little Ex-Mas	April	Also producer

=== Video games ===
Year	Title	Role	Notes
1999	Sabrina, the Teenage Witch: Spellbound	Sabrina Spellman	
2001	Sabrina the Teenage Witch: A Twitch in Time	Sabrina Spellman	

=== Dancing with the Stars ===
Week#	Dance / Song	Judge's scores			Result	Ref
Week#	Dance / Song	Inaba	Goodman	Tonioli	Result	Ref
1	Viennese Waltz / "The Time of My Life" Cha-Cha-Cha Relay / "Centerfold"	6 Awarded	6 6	6 Points	Safe	
2	Jive / "Long Tall Sally"	7	6	6	Safe	
3	Samba / "Turn Me On"	6	6	7	Safe	
4	Charleston / "Charleston"	9	9	10	Safe	
5	Argentine Tango / "Tango Barbaro" Group Hustle Dance / "The Hustle"	8 No	8 Scores	7 Given	Safe	
6	Waltz / "Only One Road"; Mambo Marathon / "Ran Kan Kan"	7 Awarded	7; 4	6 Points	Eliminated	

=== Director ===
Year	Title	Note(s)
2000–2003	Sabrina the Teenage Witch	9 episodes
2000	So Weird	Episode: "Snapshot"
2002	Taina	Episode: "Bad Review"
2005	Mute	Short
2012–2015	Melissa & Joey	6 episodes
2014	The Santa Con	Television film
2017	The Watcher in the Woods	Television film
2018–2019	The Goldbergs	3 episodes
2020–2022	Young Sheldon	5 episodes
2020	The Expanding Universe of Ashley Garcia	Episode: "Hasta La Vista, Baby"
2020	Schooled	Episode: "Lainey's Mom"
2020	The Big Show Show / Game On!: A Netflix Crossover Event	Episode: "The Big Games"
2020	Feliz NaviDAD	Television film
2022	iCarly	2 episodes
2022	Santa Bootcamp	Television film

=== Music videos ===
Year	Title	Artist	Notes
1999	"(You Drive Me) Crazy"	Britney Spears	Song was featured on Drive Me Crazy Soundtrack
2008	"Anger Cage"	Course of Nature	Hart also has co-director credit

== Audiobooks ==
- 2013: Melissa Explains It All: Tales from My Abnormally Normal Life (read by the author), Macmillan Audio, ISBN 978-1427232991

== Awards and nominations ==
Year	Association	Category	Work	Result	Ref.
1992	Young Artist Award	Best Young Actress Starring in an Off-Prime Time or Cable Series	Clarissa Explains It All	Won	
1993	Young Artist Award	Best Young Actress Starring in a Cable Series	Clarissa Explains It All	Won	
1994	Young Artist Award	Best Youth Actress Leading Role in a Television Series	Clarissa Explains It All	Nominated	
1995	Young Artist Award	Best Youth Comedienne in a TV Show	Clarissa Explains It All	Won	
1997	Saturn Awards	Best Genre TV Actress	Sabrina, the Teenage Witch	Nominated	
1997	Young Artist Award	Best Performance in a TV Comedy: Leading Young Actress	Sabrina, the Teenage Witch	Won	
1997	YoungStar Awards	Best Young Actress in a Comedy TV Series	Sabrina, the Teenage Witch	Nominated	
1998	Kids' Choice Awards	Favorite Television Actress	Sabrina, the Teenage Witch	Won	
1998	Young Artist Award	Best Performance in a TV Comedy Series: Leading Young Performer	Sabrina, the Teenage Witch	Won	
1998	Young Artist Award	Best Performance in a TV Movie or Feature Film: Young Ensemble	The Right Connections	Won	
1999	Nickelodeon Kids' Choice Awards	Favorite Television Actress	Sabrina, the Teenage Witch	Nominated	
1999	Teen Choice Awards	Choice TV Actress	Sabrina, the Teenage Witch	Nominated	
2000	Nickelodeon Kids' Choice Awards	Favorite Movie Actress	Drive Me Crazy	Won	
2000	Nickelodeon Kids' Choice Awards	Favorite Television Actress	Sabrina, the Teenage Witch	Nominated	
2001	Nickelodeon Kids' Choice Awards	Favorite Television Actress	Sabrina, the Teenage Witch	Nominated	
2002	Nickelodeon Kids' Choice Awards	Favorite Television Actress	Sabrina, the Teenage Witch	Nominated	
2003	Nickelodeon Kids' Choice Awards	Favorite Television Actress	Sabrina, the Teenage Witch	Nominated	
2013	Young Artist Award	Former Child Star Lifetime Achievement Award	Clarissa Explains It All & Sabrina, the Teenage Witch	Honored	
2015	Women's Image Network Awards	Outstanding Actress Comedy Series	Melissa & Joey (episode: "Be The Bigger Person")	Nominated	
2015	Women's Image Network Awards	Outstanding Film Directed by a Woman	Santa Con	Nominated	
2017	MovieGuide Awards	Grace Award for Movies - Actress Category	God's Not Dead 2	Won	
