= Gabrielle Jacobs =

- Shortland Street character
- Portrayed by: Virginie Le Brun
- Duration: 2009–2012
- First appearance: 13 March 2009
- Last appearance: 26 April 2012
- Introduced by: Steven Zanoski (2009, 2011)
In-universe information
- Occupation: Surgeon
- Sisters: Lana Jacobs

Dr. Gabrielle Jacobs is a fictional character on the New Zealand soap opera Shortland Street, portrayed by Virginie Le Brun throughout two stints, from 2009 to 2012. She arrived in February 2009 as a potential love interest for long serving character Chris Warner (Michael Galvin).

Appearing as the first character in the core cast with Asperger syndrome, Gabrielle was depicted as a successful Head of the Surgical Department who struggled with the social nature of her workplace. Receiving praise from Autism groups nationwide, the character brought awareness to the reality of the disorder and opportunities available to those living with Aspergers. Her storylines predominantly centred on her career advancement and romances.

The character's unusual and comedic ways saw Gabrielle become vastly popular amongst fans, winning "Favourite Female Character" at the Throng Shortland Street Fan Awards 2009.

== Creation and casting ==
Virginie Le Brun was cast as the character of Gabrielle, an over-achieving doctor with Asperger syndrome. Le Brun was undergoing some family medical issues at the time, making surgery scenes difficult to endure. The casting was made public in January 2009 and it was said that Gabrielle's arrival in March would "immediately cause some consternation amongst her fellow colleagues." Appearing as a regular character on a one-year contract, it was decided not to renew this and Gabrielle was axed from the soap. This axing came from mutual agreement between Le Brun and Producer Steven Zanoski agreed that the character and storylines had come to an end.

Following weeks of speculation in the media, in March 2011 it was announced Gabrielle would be returning to Shortland Street after over a year off-screen. Zanoski had seen a high-demand from fans for the character to return and felt the storyline necessitated this, "as stories developed following Gabrielle's departure it became apparent that the character had unfinished business. After all, she is the only woman to have broken Chris Warner's heart." After being contacted to return, Le Brun thrilled, "It's been so exciting to be back in the building and playing Gabrielle again. I love the character and it has been lovely to catch-up with the cast and crew. I am looking forward to finding out what the writers have in store for me!" The character was again written out the following year, with Le Brun finding closure, "The first time it felt quite scary but this time is different. When I left in 2010, I felt I hadn’t done everything with the character that I wanted to. This time around, I feel like I’ve scratched that itch." The character made her last appearance on 26 April 2012.

== Storylines ==
Gabrielle arrived after being hired to head the Surgery department following the murder of Ethan Pierce (Owen Black). Her absurd and antisocial behaviour amused yet confused several members of staff including CEO Callum McKay (Peter Mochrie), Chris Warner (Michael Galvin) and annoyed nurse Tania Jeffries (Faye Smythe). Gabrielle started a relationship with Kip Denton (Will Hall), who quickly tired of the lack of emotion in the relationship and dumped her. Gabrielle struggled to operate on an ex-boyfriend but was comforted by Chris, enabling her to carry through the procedure. After running over a cat, an emotional Gabrielle admitted she loved Chris. Chris' partner Libby (Fleur Saville) was appalled and tried to set Gabrielle up with Luke Durville (Gerald Urquhart), who Gabrielle showed no attraction to. Chris soon admitted his love and they started to date, while Gabrielle saved Libby from a dangerous fire.

After being offered a job in Zürich, Gabrielle began to question emotions and when Chris talked down to her, she broke it off with him and left the country. A year later, Gabrielle returned to the hospital and was instantly confronted with feelings towards Chris. She jumped into a relationship with manipulative Shane Tucker (Jason Hood) and later dated Jonathon McKenna (Kieren Hutchison). Gabrielle was fazed by the arrival of estranged sister Lana Jacobs (Brooke Williams), however the two made up. Jonathon left her heartbroken after growing sick of her, sending Gabrielle into a nervous breakdown. Gabrielle admitted her love to Chris and the two succumbed to an affair. However it was short lived and Gabrielle realised she had been used. Gabrielle received a job offer in Sweden and though initially manipulated by Chris to stay, Gabrielle asserted her independence and departed after a farewell hosted by Lana.

== Character development ==
=== Characterisation ===
Gabrielle is described as a no-fuss high achiever who knows what she wants and is highly intelligent. Due to her Asperger syndrome, Gabrielle is socially awkward and only gives eye contact if necessary. Though awkward she is confident. Le Brun described Gabrielle having a big heart, saying; "While her response is often quite severe, her intention never is – she's always coming from a good place." She also described Gabrielle's bluntness, saying; "She says things no one else would dream of saying, or they would but three seconds later respond with 'I can't believe I just said that!' But she doesn't realise it's inappropriate." She has also been described as "quirky". Le Brun tried to portray Gabrielle as innocent with her Aspergys, stating; "I do try to be sensitive to it. The really lovely thing about Gabby that I do try to show is that there is no malice in her and she has no agenda. When she says something offensive it doesn't come from a bad place. She's just stating a fact."

=== Asperger syndrome ===
By introducing a character with Asperger syndrome, producers sought to break ground, after previously receiving controversy over the character Angus Phelps who suffered from Tourettes Syndrome. Le Brun was happy that a high-profile show such as Shortland Street was giving the condition coverage, stating; "I think it's really positive bringing something like this into the forefront. I had never heard of Asperger's before my audition, and I started researching it because I wanted to make it authentic." The character was said to question the nations social consciousness. Le Brun struggled to portray difficult lines with no emotion, describing them as some of the shows most difficult lines ever spoken. Storylines airing upon her first stint in 2009 saw colleagues bewildered and hesitant at the new doctor, with Kip Denton not handling no emotion in his relationship and quitting their brief liaison. In 2010 Gabrielle began to question feelings and when she was talked down to by partner, Chris, she broke it off with him and left the show. In 2011 upon her return, it is revealed Gabrielle is revealed to be in turmoil over a man dying while fixing one of her surgical machines in Zurich but she is unable to express the emotion she holds inside. Chris begins to suspect Shane Tucker of using Gabrielle's condition to manipulate her into a relationship and Jonathon later dumps Gabrielle after growing sick of her lack of spontaneous behaviour. This causes Gabrielle to become very self-conscious, with Le Brun explaining; "She was pretty crazy about him and she really got her heart broken good and truly for the first time ever. It really knocked her for six and she kind of imploded a little bit and went, 'Oh gosh, I'll never be loveable, no one will ever love me rwally because I'm too weird.' She turns it all inwards and it went quite badly."

Producer – Steven Zanoski, encouraged Le Brun and Galvin to don Christmas outfits in this scene from December 2011 where Gabrielle admits her love to Chris. The episode was viewed by 640,000 viewers.

=== Relationship with Chris Warner ===
The character of Gabrielle was originally written into the show as a potential love interest for long serving character Chris Warner. The two were referred to as "Spock and Kirk" by a writer of the show, referencing the famous Star Trek characters. While Chris was involved with Libby Jeffries, he and Gabrielle started to share a lot of scenes together on screen, with Chris being one of the only characters to accept Gabrielle's aspergers. Chris eventually fell in love with Gabrielle and admitted this at his farewell party in front of Libby. After arriving back in New Zealand he dumps Libby for Gabrielle, though she is at first hesitant, worried she has hurt Libby. The two eventually get together and settle down, with Chris thinking Gabrielle is 'the one'. Producer Steven Zanoski liked the partnership but noted flaws, stating; "Chris has always gone out with glamorous women in the past and now he's found someone who challenges his mind, it helps that she is gorgeous as well. Chris is slowly trying to change Gabrielle, but whether she wants to be changed is another story." Gabrielle soon grows sick of Chris patronizing her and dumps him shortly before leaving the country. Upon her return in April 2011, Gabrielle struggles not to be jealous of Chris moving on with Rachel McKenna and later states she is still in love with Chris. Le Brun enjoyed the pairing of Gabrielle and Chris, stating; "There was a nice dynamic between them because Chris is so used to being the top gun in everything. For once, someone could challenge him to do things he hadn't done before such as playing mental chess. I think it was that sort of thing that put him on the back foot and why he had his heart broken." After he tries to warn Shane Tucker off Gabrielle for her best interests, Gabrielle lashes out at him for prying into her business. In December Gabrielle realises she is in love with Chris again after she witnesses him dressing as Santa for child cancer patients. Chris admits his love as well and the two start an affair in the Christmas cliffhanger.

== Reception ==
Gabrielle has been seen as highly popular to fans, taking out "Favourite Female Character" at the Throng Shortland Street Fan Awards 2009 and winning runner up in "Favourite New Character" and "Funniest Moment". In 2012, the character was named as one of the standout characters of the show's first 20 years.

Hugh Sundae of The New Zealand Herald praised Gabrielle, saying anything involving the character was bound to be good. Brooke Williams who appeared as Gabrielle's sister Lana Jacobs in July 2011 stated upon arrival that Gabrielle was her favourite character.

As soon as she learnt about her character's condition, Le Brun accepted the heavy scrutiny she was going to receive due to the controversy of the topic. Gabrielle's portrayal of Asperger syndrome was praised, with Jon Boyer of Autism New Zealand stating on her return to the soap in 2011; "Autism New Zealand is thrilled that the character of Gabrielle Jacobs is returning to Shortland Street. The rise in awareness for Autism and Asperger's Syndrome that this character generated was fantastic and we commend Virginie Le Brun for the research she undertook before taking on this challenging role. We would like to congratulate the makers of Shortland Street for presenting Asperger's Syndrome in a fair, balanced yet very entertaining way." Le Brun received positive feedback for her portrayal of Asperger's Syndrome. Mothers of teenagers with the syndrome said their children had taken pride in seeing Gabrielle's character on TV. Le Brun explained the benefits of portraying the role as helping educate viewers about Asperger's, stating; "Kids who have Asperger's have tuned in where they might not have done so before. I think they can find it quite reassuring. We've had the odd email or mums saying they look at it as a bit of an inspiration that while things are difficult, you can do good things with your life." Le Brun met with people from Asperger's organisations and was pleased with the positive reception.
