= Jonathon McKenna =

Fictional character in the New Zealand soap opera Shortland Street

- Shortland Street character
- Jonathon in 2011
- Portrayed by: Kieren Hutchison
- Duration: 1993–1996, 2011
- First appearance: 19 October 1993
- Last appearance: 11 November 2011
- Introduced by: Tony Holden (1993); Gavin Stawhan (1996); Steven Zanoski (2011)
- Jonathon in 1994
In-universe information
- Occupation: Surgeon
- Father: Michael McKenna
- Mother: Alex McKenna
- Sisters: Rachel McKenna
- Grandmothers: May McKenna
- Uncles: John Wilson
- Aunts: Trish Wilson; Shirley McKenna
- First cousins: Waverley Harrison; Stratford Wilson; Amberley Wilson

Jonathon Alexander McKenna is a fictional character in the New Zealand soap opera Shortland Street. He is portrayed by Kieren Hutchison, who played the role in both recurring and regular stints in the 1990s, before returning for a six-month period during 2011.

Jonathon was created as the final installment to the recently expanded McKenna family unit; he was the son of the Shortland Street clinic's CEO, Michael McKenna (Paul Gittins). His initial storyline saw the character embark on a same-sex relationship with paramedic Jamie Forrest (Karl Urban) much to the outrage of his family and co workers. Jonathon appeared on a sporadic basis, making for 3 stints between 1993 and 1996, before returning again 15 years later. Other plot lines Jonathon was involved in include, several other same-sex relationships, dropping out of medical school, falling out with his parents and sister, having an HIV scare, developing blindness, and embarking on a relationship with a woman.

Jonathon is remembered as an "iconic" character, largely due to the impact his homosexual status had on the viewing public. He and boyfriend Jamie's kiss was the first same-sex kiss on prime time New Zealand television and was even edited largely due to the controversy at the time. His 2011 return was well received upon airing though his bisexual reclassification was criticized by fans.

== Creation and casting ==
To widen demographic audiences, producers ensured Shortland Street featured family units so that several key characteristics could be met (middle aged parents, teenage children). In mid-1992 it was decided to expand on the established character, Michael McKenna (Paul Gittins) (who had appeared since the show's first episode), by introducing his family. The character of Stuart Neilson (Martin Henderson) who featured as part of the original cast, had been planned to be depicted as gay, but the plans fell through and he was rewritten as heterosexual. It was decided that the character of Michael's son would fit the position. Kieren Hutchison auditioned for the role when he was 18 and eventually learned he had secured the role, much to his surprise as he considered his audition "shocking". He signed an initial 6-month contract. The job was not what he expected but he soon settled in and enjoyed working alongside screen sister, Angela Bloomfield (Rachel McKenna). Hutchison departed after the 6 months, but returned for several similarly lengthened stints. After leaving in 1995, Hutchison scored a return to the role in 1996 and was interested at how the character's storylines and dynamics had changed following the departure of his parents. Hutchison decided to take a break from the show in September 1996 so that he could film the television series, The Swiss Family Robinson. Hutchison and producers intended for Jonathon to return to the soap in 1997, but Hutchison decided against it and quit indefinitely.

Due to living and working overseas, Hutchison became unfamiliar with Shortland Street but discovered through Facebook that his onscreen sister, Bloomfield, had returned; potentially meaning a return for his character in the future. In 2010, the character of Jonathon was occasionally mentioned throughout dialogue as so the audience remained aware that Rachel had a brother. Hutchison was asked to reprise the role in March 2011 as part of the build up towards the shows 20th anniversary in 2012. In April it was announced that a "former cast member" would be returning with the news being revealed on 12 May that it would be Jonathon. Hutchison was quoted as saying: "It was really nice to have some familiar faces in the building. Being able to work with Angela (Rachel McKenna) and Michael [Galvin] (Chris Warner) again has been fantastic." Hutchison signed on in a 6-month stint. He returned on 23 May 2011. The character departed on 11 November 2011.

== Storylines ==
Jonathon arrived in October 1993 after being expelled from boarding school in Australia. Jonathon's parents Alex (Liddy Holloway) and Michael (Paul Gittins) grew proud of their son after he landed the lead role in a play but were devastated when Rachel (Angela Bloomfield) read his diary and revealed he was gay. Jonathon started to date Jamie Forrest (Karl Urban) and Michael saved the two from a group of drunk homophobics. The two broke up because of Jonathon's immaturity and Jonathon departed to medical school in Dunedin. Jonathon returned when Alex fell into a coma and departed shortly into 1995 with his boyfriend Tony. He returned as a research assistant in 1996 and had an affair with Kane Taiaroa (Joe Folau) but departed to visit his father in the countryside following an HIV scare.

In 2001 when Rachel realised she was beginning to fall in love with Chris Warner (Michael Galvin) despite being in a relationship, she fled to visit Jonathon in Thailand. The following year Rachel pretended she was going to visit Jonathon when in reality she was having a tubaligation. In 2009 Rachel revealed she had lost contact with Jonathon but in 2010 she flew to Paris following the news Jonathon had been in a serious car crash. In 2011 Jonathon returned to Ferndale to seek an operation on his brain following the crash. The surgery left him blind and Jonathon fell for his surgeon – Gabrielle (Virginie Le Brun). The two started to date and Jonathon regained his sight. After several months Jonathon began to tire of Gabrielle and broke it off, only to end up making moves on Daniel Potts (Ido Drent) unsuccessfully. He returned to Los Angeles in November.

== Character development ==
=== Characterisation ===
Upon arrival, Jonathon was described as "Drop dead gorgeous, highly intelligent, gifted athlete and all round Mr Nice Guy". He was shown to be extremely confident, to the point where he was happy with not meeting his parents expectations. This clashed with Jonathon's father, Michael's (Paul Gittins) views and the two were "constantly at loggerheads". Michael was said to, "find his only son irritating. Life seems too easy for him." The relationship between Jonathon and his mother Alex (Liddy Holloway) was a lot more close however and the two were described as, "best of friends". Jonathon got on well with his sister, Rachel (Angela Bloomfield), but they were competitive; he was, "protective of his baby sister but often finds himself competing wither her for parental funds and attention." Jonathon was also described as naive, he was "by no means cruel but his arrogant flippancy cuts like a knife. Having never experienced rejection and self-doubt, Jonathon is blithely ignorant of the emotional pain of others." A backstory was established between Jonathon and Nick Harrison (Karl Burnett) which saw the two clash in several story lines. Jonathon was classed as more "sophisticated" than the "perennially adolescent" Nick. Upon Jonathon's reappearance to the soap in 1996, the character and his story lines had drastically changed. Both Alex and Michael had departed the soap and as such, Jonathon was portrayed as more mature and one of his story lines saw him dabble in drugs. Hutchison noticed an immense change during his stint, "It has also been interesting not having Jonathon's parents on the show - his storylines are now quite different." A 2011 storyline saw Jonathon fall blind and fail to seek satisfaction from his girlfriend, Gabrielle Jacobs (Virginie Le Brun), Hutchison explained, "Jonathon is devastated that the blindness has left him unable to help and when Gabrielle does not offer him the support he so desperately needs it just sinks him lower and lower."

=== Sexuality ===
Upon the expansion of the McKenna family unit, producers sought to depict a hugely modern ideal and as such, several key ethical elements were written into the characters, such as eating disorders, mid life crisis', alcoholism, and writing the son to be a homosexual. Upon being cast, Hutchison was informed that Jonathon was in fact bisexual, though this was left ambiguous onscreen with the only true hint being a potential crush on the character of Joanna Jordan (Greer Robson). Hutchison thought the character helped break down the stereotypes surrounding homosexuality, stating in 1996: "The fact that Jonathan is gay is secondary. He's just one of the gang. I enjoyed playing him like that because it breaks down stereotypes." As Jonathon's storyline developed and Hutchison had numerous breaks, the bisexuality was never explained in detail. Everytime Hutchison returned to filming, producers ensured him they would explore the storyline and he would get a female love interest, Hutchison explained the idea saying; "the whole point is that he's quite comfortable with the fact that he likes both sexes even though other people don't get it." Jonathon was slated to return after his departure in 1996 and was promised the storyline would be played, but he decided to leave the show. Upon being asked to reprise the role in 2011, producer Steven Zanoski suggested they retry the lost storyline and Hutchison happily agreed.

== Reception ==
Jonathon's return was listed as one of the top 11 best things to happen in 2011 by Television New Zealand. The character was later hailed as iconic. The storyline featuring Jonathon's crush and subsequent love affair with paramedic Jamie Forrest proved both controversial and ground breaking. The couple's kiss became the first same sex kiss on prime time New Zealand television and the storyline even helped a closeted gay male accept his sexuality. The couple's same sex relationship was at the time so controversial that the kiss was not actually shown, with only Sam's expression being witnessed. Hutchison himself believed that his character helped break down stereotypes surrounding homosexuality and enjoyed playing the HIV storyline due to its meaty content. Medical students also enjoyed how Jonathon represented their lives, with one saying; "It amused us when Jonathon talked about living in Dunedin, his classes at Medical School, his friends and so on. It is script for him but reality for us."

Hutchison has stated that during his first stints from 1992–1995, he received much "agro" and homophobic fan mail and that after his return in 1996, it was a lot more calmed and less hateful. Jonathon's storylines in 1996 were also a lot more controversial than his early plots, with Hutchison noting the characters experimentation with drugs and rocky relationships as being highly controversial. Upon Jonathon's return in 2011, his sexual status was made unclear and fans were outraged when the character embarked on a relationship with female character, Gabrielle Jacobs. Following weeks of criticism, scenes aired in June where Jonathon stated he was bisexual, contradicting comments made in past years.
