= Jamie Forrest =

Fictional character

- Shortland Street character
- Portrayed by: Karl Urban
- Duration: 1993–1994
- First appearance: 7 May 1993; Episode 250
- Last appearance: 22 February 1994
- Introduced by: Brian Lenanne
In-universe information
- Occupation: Paramedic
- Mother: Nina Forrest

Jamie Forrest is a fictional character on the New Zealand soap opera Shortland Street. The character was portrayed by Karl Urban for a guest stint in mid-1993 before returning later in the year for a 6-month recurring stint. The character is remembered as the first openly gay character on the show.

== Creation and casting ==
During pre-production of Shortland Street in the early 1990s, producers planned for original character Stuart Neilson to be gay. Despite the plot already having been written and the storylines airing on-screen, Television New Zealand became anxious and requested Stuart be rewritten at the last minute to be heterosexual. As part of the discussion to rewrite the character, Producer Caterina De Nave negotiated the introduction of a gay character at a later-time; and Jamie Forrest was created. Jamie debuted in 1993 in what was a groundbreaking storyline at the time. The character appeared in a short guest stint before returning for a 6-month recurring stint.

== Storylines ==
Jamie arrived at Shortland Street, surprising childhood friend Kirsty (Angela Dotchin) with a playful marriage proposal. Explaining to Gina Rossi (Josephine Davison) that the two had made a promise to marry each other as children, Kirsty would make a serious play at Jamie. However, it would be revealed that Jamie was gay when he was picked up and kissed by his boyfriend Isaac to the shock and dismay of his paramedic partner Sam Aleni (Rene Naufahu). Sam would make a point of distancing himself from Jamie which was exacerbated by Steve Mills (Andrew Binns) inviting Jamie to stay with the two temporarily. The two made up after Jamie was electrocuted by their fridge malfunctioning and a stern talk from Kirsty directed at Sam. Jamie ended up leaving the hospital but returned some months later and the teenage Jonathon McKenna (Kieren Hutchison) developed a crush on him that eventually evolved into a relationship. Jonathon's father Michael (Paul Gittins) was heavily against the two's relationship and ended up temporarily disowning his son. Michael saved the couple from a group of homophobes but the two ended up breaking up. Jamie found solace being an advocate for HIV and gay rights before he eventually reconciled with Jonathon. However, when Jamie decided to move to Christchurch to take up a new role as an Educator with a family planning organisation and travel the world, the two broke up and made peace.

== Reception ==
Jamie is remembered as the first ever openly homosexual character on the show. His romance with Jonathon proved both controversial and groundbreaking. It helped educate New Zealanders on homosexuality and even helped a confused teenager accept his sexuality. In 2017 stuff.co.nz journalist Fleur Mealing named Jamie as the seventh character she most wanted to return for the show's 25th anniversary, citing the need to celebrate the first openly gay character on the show whilst it was in the midst of portraying its first transgender character Blue Nathan.
