= The Adventures of Swiss Family Robinson =

- Genre: Family drama
- Based on: The Swiss Family Robinson by Johann David Wyss
- Directed by: John Laing; Declan Eames
- Starring: Richard Thomas; Margo Gunn; Kieren Hutchison
- Composer: Simon May
- Original language: English
- No. of seasons: 1
- No. of episodes: 30

Production
- Producer: Raymond Thompson
- Running time: 26 min. per episode

Original release
- Network: PAX Network
- Release: September 1 – October 15, 1998

The Adventures of Swiss Family Robinson is a 1998 family adventure series that originally aired on Pax. Based on the 1812 novel The Swiss Family Robinson by Johann David Wyss, it follows the adventures of nine survivors of a shipwreck as they attempt to adapt to life on a deserted island. It lasted for one season, with 10 three-episode segments.

== Background ==
This was the fifth television series based on the 1812 novel and followed nearly a dozen theatrical and made-for-television film versions. Like many of these previous versions, it altered story lines and added several members to the cast of characters.

== Broadcast ==
The show contained 10 story arcs of three episodes each and aired on closely spaced dates over seven weeks in September and October 1998. It was one of the first shows broadcast on the newly formed PAX network.

It was also aired on the Sri Lankan television channel Rupavahini, dubbed in the Sinhala language under the title Robinson Andaraya ("රොබින්සන් අන්දරය"), and in Italy on Rai 1 and 7 Gold.

== Cast ==
- Richard Thomas as David Robinson
- Margo Gunn as Elizabeth Robinson
- Kieren Hutchison as Ernst Robinson
- Charlotte Woollams as Joanna Robinson
- Mia Koning as Christina Robinson
- Chantelle Yee as Emily Chen
- Gareth Howell as Ben Thomas
- Junior Chile as Billy Cobb
- Ken Blackburn as Oscar Wyss
- K.C. Kelly as Jed Parsons

== Episodes ==
1. "Survival (Part 1)" (September 1, 1998)
2. "Survival (Part 2)" (September 2, 1998)
3. "Survival (Part 3)" (September 3, 1998)
4. "The Island of the Gods (Part 1)" (September 4, 1998)
5. "The Island of the Gods (Part 2)" (September 8, 1998)
6. "The Island of the Gods (Part 3)" (September 9, 1998)
7. "Invasion (Part 1)" (September 10, 1998)
8. "Invasion (Part 2)" (September 11, 1998)
9. "Invasion (Part 3)" (September 14, 1998)
10. "Princess From the Sea (Part 1)" (September 15, 1998)
11. "Princess From the Sea (Part 2)" (September 16, 1998)
12. "Princess From the Sea (Part 3)" (September 17, 1998)
13. "Captives (Part 1)" (September 20, 1998)
14. "Captives (Part 2)" (September 21, 1998)
15. "Captives (Part 3)" (September 22, 1998)
16. "The Ghost of Raven Jones (Part 1)" (September 23, 1998)
17. "The Ghost of Raven Jones (Part 2)" (September 26, 1998)
18. "The Ghost of Raven Jones (Part 3)" (September 27, 1998)
19. "The Treasure Hunt (Part 1)" (September 28, 1998)
20. "The Treasure Hunt (Part 2)" (September 29, 1998)
21. "The Treasure Hunt (Part 3)" (October 2, 1998)
22. "Star-Crossed Lovers (Part 1)" (October 3, 1998)
23. "Star-Crossed Lovers (Part 2)" (October 4, 1998)
24. "Star-Crossed Lovers (Part 3)" (October 5, 1998)
25. "Paradise Lost (Part 1)" (October 8, 1998)
26. "Paradise Lost (Part 2)" (October 9, 1998)
27. "Paradise Lost (Part 3)" (October 10, 1998)
28. "Boston (Part 1)" (October 11, 1998)
29. "Boston (Part 2)" (October 14, 1998)
30. "Boston (Part 3)" (October 15, 1998)

== Media information ==
Questar/Sunset Home Visual Entertainment (SHE) released a complete series DVD in 2005.
