= Damaged (Course of Nature album) =

Studio album by Course of Nature
- Released: January 29, 2008
- Genres: Alternative rock, hard rock, post-grunge
- Length: 38:11
- Label: Silent Majority Group
- Producer: David Bendeth

Course of Nature chronology
Superkala (2002)	Damaged (2008)

Professional ratings
Review scores
Source	Rating
Allmusic	2.5/5 stars

Damaged is the second album from alternative rock group Course of Nature, and their first in six years. Damaged was released on January 29, 2008, and would be the band's final album prior to their breakup in 2011.

== Track listing ==
All songs written by Mark Wilkerson.

1. Anger Cage - 3:05
2. Right Before My Eyes - 4:33
3. Time Is Slipping Away - 3:07
4. Memory Of You - 3:46
5. The Window - 3:13
6. Live Again - 3:49
7. Gone - 4:42
8. How Great You Are - 3:53
9. World At War - 3:19
10. Forget Her - 4:41
