= Nicole Tubiola =

American actress (born 1979)

- Years active: 1998–present
- Spouse: Kieren Hutchison (m. 2003)
- Children: 1

Nicole Tubiola is an American actress best known for her role as Danielle "Dani" Davis on Wildfire (2005–2008). She has appeared in the films Fired Up! (2009) and My Fake Fiancé (2009).

== Private life ==
Tubiola grew up in Bullhead City, Arizona, and graduated from Mohave High School in 1997. She married Wildfire co-star, Kieren Hutchison on August 10, 2003, and on September 5, 2007, she gave birth to a son named Quinn.

== Career ==
On April 19, 2009, Tubiola starred in My Fake Fiancé as Courtney, which aired on ABC Family. In 2012, she appeared in the New Zealand soap opera Shortland Street, playing drug and addiction counsellor "Rose Moore".

== Filmography ==
Film roles
Year	Title	Role	Notes
2004	Imaginary Heroes	Tabitha	
2009	Fired Up!	Marcy	
2009	Wake	Cousin	
2010	Wake Up	Leslie	Short film
2014	Echo Park	Martha	

Television roles
Year	Title	Role	Notes
1998	Hang Time	Tamara	Episode: "Love Triangle"
1999	Undressed	Jen	
2000	Brutally Normal	Girlfriend #1	Episode: "Mouth Full of Warm Roses"
2000	The Amanda Show	Cheerleader	3 episodes
2001	The Steve Harvey Show	Clarice	Episode: "Dual Intentions"
2002	The District	Janelle De Sica	Episode: "The Killing Point"
2002	Sabretooth	Lola Rodriguez	Television film
2003	Boston Public	Rosie Sanchez	Episode: "Chapter Sixty-Eight"
2005–2008	Wildfire	Danielle Davis	51 episodes
2009	My Fake Fiancé	Courtney	Television film
2012	Shortland Street	Rose Moore	4 episodes

Music video roles
Year	Title	Artist	Role
2015	"Deep Breath On Three"	Richard Grewar	Girlfriend

Producer
Year	Title	Role	Notes
2017–2019	A Kid Explains History	Co-producer	13 episodes
