= Wildfire (2005 TV series) =

- Genre: Teen drama
- Created by: Michael Piller; Christopher Teague
- Starring: Genevieve Cortese; Nicole Tubiola; Nana Visitor; Greg Serano; Micah Alberti; James Read; Ryan Sypek; Andrew Hoeft; Charlotte Salt
- Composers: Jay Gruska; Shawn Pierce; Patric Caird
- Country of origin: United States
- Original language: English
- No. of seasons: 4
- No. of episodes: 52

Production
- Production location: New Mexico, United States
- Running time: 60 minutes
- Production companies: Piller² (2005–2006) (seasons 1–2); The Segan Company (2005–2006) (seasons 1–2); The Piller/Segan Company (2007–2008) (seasons 3–4); Lionsgate Television; BVS Entertainment

Original release
- Network: ABC Family
- Release: June 20, 2005 – May 26, 2008

Wildfire is an American teen drama television series that aired on ABC Family from June 2005 to May 2008. The show was produced by Lionsgate Television, Piller², and The Segan Company (which would later merge into Piller/Segan to produce Greek). The show premiered on June 20, 2005; its fourth and final season ended on May 16, 2008, due to low ratings. Season one averaged just over a million weekly viewers and season two increased to 1.56 million, an increase of over 50%. Season three dropped back to the first year's numbers. The theme song is "Morning Light" sung by Truman.

== Plot ==
Wildfire follows troubled Kris Furillo who, after serving time at a teen detention center, is given the opportunity to start a new life. Her talent with horses is recognized by a volunteer and local trainer Pablo, who arranges a job for her at the Ritters' family-run ranch, Raintree. Thrown into a completely new environment, Kris must learn to deal with the challenges of fitting in and forming fiery relationships while trying not to disappoint the one family willing to give her a chance. The Ritters are facing challenges of their own even as they reach out to help Kris. Patriarch Henry Ritter and his daughter Jean are in a critical stage of their battle to save the ranch from financial ruin. Kris and Wildfire must help them get back on the map in the world of horse racing.

== Characters ==
- Kristine "Kris" Furillo (Genevieve Cortese) A jockey who previously served time at Camp LaGrange, a correctional facility, for grand theft auto. She shares a special bond with Wildfire, a horse she saved from going to slaughter and helped turn into a champion racehorse. At one point, she was involved with her agent, Kerry Connelly, until he slept with Gillian, his ex-girlfriend. Kris spent most of the show in an on-and-off relationship with Junior Davis, until she pursued a brief but passionate fling with Matt Ritter in Season 3. She then proceeded to marry Junior in the series finale.
- Matthew "Matt" Ritter (Micah Alberti) The son of Jean and Pete Ritter and the older brother of Todd Ritter. In Season 3 he becomes the co-owner of Raintree Farm along with his mother, inheriting his half of the farm's ownership when his grandfather (Jean's father), Henry Ritter, died. Early on, Matt wanted nothing to do with the "family business" of horses and racing, but came to discover he had a talent for training and conditioning Thoroughbreds and eventually took over as Raintree's head trainer.
- Kenneth "Junior" Davis Jr. (Ryan Sypek) The son of Ken Davis and Isabelle Matiya Ferris, and older half-brother to Dani. A very indecisive young man, he has gotten into gambling, owned a night club (which he lost in a bet with his former bookie, Bobby), dabbled in the sport of professional bull riding, and been involved on and off in the running of Davis Farms throughout the series. At one point he sold most of his shares of the farm and regretted it. Even though Junior tries his hardest to break away from the "rich kid" stereotype, he loves his Porsche convertible. Junior spent most of the series in an on-again, off-again relationship with Kris, eventually marrying her in the series finale.
- Danielle "Dani" Davis (Nicole Tubiola) Daughter of Ken Davis and an unseen woman named Marisol deEsquvala, and younger half-sister of Junior. Dani started off being openly snobby, promiscuous, and catty but later became more likeable. She took over the running of Davis Farms after her father was indicted on fraud charges but signed her shares of the farm over to Junior after losing her racing license at the end of season three. In Season 4 she also runs her own veterinary clinic.
- Ken Davis Sr (James Read) Father of Junior and Dani. He ran Davis Farms until being indicted on six counts of fraud, which forced him to leave Davis Farms and his assets to his children and, in a series of events, caused him to lose his role as majority shareholder to Dani. After being acquitted of all the charges, Ken bought back 46% of Davis Farms. Out of all the romantic relationships that Junior and Dani ever had, the only one that Ken did not hate was Junior's relationship with Laura Nichols, the daughter of a congressman.
- Jean Ritter (Nana Visitor) Matt and Todd's mother and the co-owner of Raintree Farm. Jean is reluctant to let Kris work at Raintree at first, but eventually grows to think of her as a daughter; in season three she often bumped heads with Kris and her son, Matt, over Wildfire's training and how Raintree should be run.
- Pablo Betart (Greg Serano) An ex-convict and respected horseman. Pablo discovered Kris's talent for horses and riding while working as a volunteer trainer at Camp LaGrange and brought her to work for the Ritters. He is co-owner of Wildfire with Jean Ritter and her son, Matt, and Raintree's head trainer for most of the series.
- Henry Ritter (Dennis Weaver) Henry is Jean's father, Matt and Todd's grandfather and Pete's former father-in-law. At the beginning of the series he is shown to be a very quick-spoken, warm person. He dislikes his daughter's relationship with Ken Davis and does not like his children Dani or Junior either. He also shows that he likes Kris and helps her out as often as he can. He confronts Matt about his gambling and forces him to tell his mother, both of whom are furious with Matt. Shortly after, he disappears from the show and later in the series is mentioned dead, probably due to the 2006 passing away of Weaver, leaving a will handing over half of Raintree to Jean and the other half to Matt after he 'figures' out an Andalusian horse which he also left in his will for Matt and Todd
- Tina Sharp (Amy Jo Johnson) A hotshot jockey brought in by Jean and Pablo to ride Wildfire in The Sandpiper Classic, a major race. A very sweet, flirty girl, no one but Pablo suspected that she was bad news until she accepted an offer from Ken to ride Avatar, one of his best horses against Wildfire. She also had a fling with Matt at the end of season one and indicated that she had a fling with Pablo in the past.
- Gillian Parsons (Charlotte Salt) A wealthy heiress who came to Dani's rescue when she needed money to save Davis Farms while Ken was in jail. She also came in as the ex-girlfriend of Kerry Conelly and slept with him while she was dating Matt. She gave up control of Davis Farms in order to keep her affair secret. However, Gillian comes clean after Matt has an affair with Kris and breaks up with Gillian. She then has a brief almost-fling with Junior before she goes back to England.
- Kerry Connelly (Kieren Hutchison) A sports agent who signed on to represent Kris as her career started to take off. He did not mention his long-distance relationship with Gillian until after she walked in on him making out with Kris at the Davis charity ball and then proceeded to sleep with Gillian in order to get Kris a spot in the Breeders Invitational.
- Todd Ritter (Andrew Hoeft) son of Jean, and Matt's younger brother. He is in junior high and lives at Raintree Farm for the first three seasons and then goes away to boarding school.
- Sheik Omar Al Sayed (Maurizio Rasti) He and his brother are very powerful players in the racing world. He purchases the best horses to race. He originally came to Raintree to see if Wildfire qualified to race in the Gold Cup, then returned wanting to purchase Wildfire. Later on, he came back to town to host the Bristol Stakes and had a brief flirtation with Dani. She did not reciprocate the feelings because she was still hung up on RJ. He then proceeded to organize an illegal match race between Raintree and Davis Farms with a purse of two million dollars, with some of his investors. He is not heard from again after the season three finale.
- RJ Blake (Eric Winter) : A bull rider who became friends with Junior after he sees a kindred passion for riding bulls. He also starts a flirtation with his sister, Dani, and later ends up falling in love with her. He is killed in the episode "Heartless".

=== Guest cast and characters ===
Name	Character name	# of Appearances
Name	Character name	Season 1	Season 2	Season 3	Season 4
Joe Lando	Pete Ritter	2	4
Josh Berry	Bart Blitzer	2	1	2
Shanna Collins	Amber	5
Debrah Farentino	Isabelle Matia-Faris	1	3
Maurizo Farhad	Sheik Omar			4
Arye Gross	Charlie Hewitt	6	5
Jude Herrera	Leanne Diaz		1
Ross Kelly	Wayne	2
Jason London	Bobby	6	2	2
Scarlett McAlister	Wendy Levy	2	2
Jonathan Murphy	Calvin Handley				6
David Ramsey	Dr. Noah Gleason				5
Ignacio Serricchio	Jace Furillo			1
Amanda Seyfried	Rebecca		5
Gary Stevens	Augie French		1
John Terry	Jesse Ritter			2	3
Kristy Vaughan	Molly Blitzer	1	1
Robbie Washington	Evan Garvey	3
Eric Winter	R.J. Blake			5
Alicia Ziegler	Laura Nichols				5

== Episodes ==
=== Series overview ===
Season	Episodes	Originally released	
Season	Episodes	First released	Last released
1	13	June 20, 2005	September 12, 2005
2	13	January 22, 2006	April 10, 2006
3	13	January 1, 2007	March 26, 2007
4	13	January 21, 2008	May 26, 2008

=== Season 1 (2005) ===
No. overall	No. in season	Title	Original release date
1	1	"Wildfire"	June 20, 2005
2	2	"Wildfire"	June 20, 2005
Kris is a young girl with a troubled past who gets a second chance luckily when she goes to work at a horse farm, but being an outsider in a high-stakes world is not easy. Her only friend is a horse named Wildfire, and when he is threatened she makes a decision that will affect both their lives forever. She gets put back in Oakly prison for 90 days.
3	3	"Trust"	June 27, 2005
Kris returns to the Ritter ranch after being released from juvenile detention a second time; Dani gets jealous when Matt pursues Kris.
4	4	"Mothers"	July 11, 2005
Kris's substance-abusing mom, Barb, shows up unexpectedly at Raintree with suspicious intentions; Jean reluctantly admits that the farm is in financial distress.
5	5	"Guilty"	July 18, 2005
Tension mounts when Wildfire's training times have yet to improve; Kris resorts to taking on a full-time job to help out with Raintree's finances; Matt dabbles with a dangerous hobby for his personal benefit.
6	6	"The Claiming Race"	July 25, 2005
In order to give Wildfire a fighting chance in a race, Kris agrees to do something she promised she never would; Matt delves deeper into a shady world; Dani pushes a friendship to the limit.
7	7	"Lost & Found"	August 1, 2005
Wildfire and another horse are missing, causing Kris, Junior, Dani, and Matt to head into the mountains to look for them; Jean dares to open her heart until a blast from the past threatens to break it.
8	8	"The Track"	August 8, 2005
Foul play puts Wildfire in danger; Matt's troubles go from bad to worse when a gambling debt makes him part with his prized possession; Dani gets unexpected support from Junior when she needs it most.
9	9	"The Party"	August 15, 2005
Matt and Junior throw a party while Jean is away; Dani sets her eyes on a handsome stranger; Bobby turns up the pressure on Matt to settle a score, while Junior tries to win Kris.
10	10	"Identity"	August 22, 2005
Kris neglects her GED studies to train with a famous female jockey; Dani investigates her mother's identity; Matt confronts Kris about her feelings for Junior, and Junior and Kris become a couple.
11	11	"Tina Sharp"	August 29, 2005
Superstar jockey Tina Sharp returns to help Kris overcome her injury, but ends up creating more trouble than she solves; Dani's curiosity about her past begins to catch up with her.
12	12	"Impressions"	September 5, 2005
Raintree enters the limelight when Tina Sharp invites a TV crew to film her training for the important Sandpiper Classic, a race that could help Raintree out of its financial woes.
13	13	"Loyalty"	September 12, 2005
Kris and Junior arrive at a crossroads; Dani learns the unsettling truth about her mother; Wildfire races in the Sandpiper Classic against his arch rival, Avatar.

=== Season 2 (2006) ===
No. overall	No. in season	Title	Original release date
14	1	"Try It Without The Porsche"	January 2, 2006
Kris becomes a celebrity following her exciting ride in the Sandpiper Classic; Junior moves away from home; Pablo begins a relationship with a reporter.
15	2	"Opportunity Knocks"	January 9, 2006
Kris stars in a television commercial with encouragement from her new agent, Kerry; Junior and Pete become partners in a new club; Dani starts her own stable.
16	3	"A Good Convict Is Hard To Find"	January 16, 2006
Kris experiences old temptation while helping out at a charity event; Matt and Junior open the club without Pete; Dani learns that Isabelle lied to her.
17	4	"Dangerous Liaisons"	January 23, 2006
Kris is left alone at Raintree and must call Junior for help; Jean and Charlie go on a romantic getaway; Matt is in over his head when he tries to purchase a horse for Dani.
18	5	"Family Matters"	January 30, 2006
Matt trains both Kris and Dani for an upcoming race; Charlie helps Todd establish his independence from Jean; Isabelle reveals her true colors.
19	6	"Nothing Takes The Past Away Like The Future"	February 6, 2006
Pablo's past ties to a crime syndicate catch up with him; Ken Davis threatens to reveal the truth about Isabelle's finances; Matt agrees to work for Dani as a full-time trainer.
20	7	"Taking Off"	February 27, 2006
Kris clashes with a legendary trainer, and starts questioning everything she knows; Rebecca moves into Junior's apartment; Charlie proposes to Jean.
21	8	"Fear"	March 6, 2006
Kris turns to Junior for help when a mob enforcer demands that she throw a race; Matt learns that Pete sabotaged his former clubs for insurance money.
22	9	"Break Down"	March 13, 2006
Kris loses confidence in her riding abilities following a racing accident; Junior puts his club on the line in a wager with Bobby.
23	10	"51/49"	March 20, 2006
Ken Davis is arrested and indicted for fraud; Kris, Dani, Matt and Junior find themselves stranded at Davis Farm during a storm.
24	11	"Who Are You"	March 27, 2006
Kris must convince an heiress to give Wildfire an invitation to the prestigious Breeders' Invitational race; Dani plots to ruin Kris's plans.
25	12	"For Love or Money"	April 3, 2006
Wildfire competes with Dani's horse for a Breeders' Invitational slot; Belladonna goes into labor with Baby Wildfire(Flame); Kerry rekindles his romance with Gillian.
26	13	"Close Shave"	April 10, 2006
Kris must decide between staying at Raintree or traveling to Europe with Kerry to further her career; Wildfire races in the Breeders' Invitational Stakes.

=== Season 3 (2007) ===
No. overall	No. in season	Title	Original release date
27	1	"Fairy Tale Endings"	January 1, 2007
The Ritters are shaken by Kerry's disappearance and a family member's death; Dani takes control of the Davis farm; Ken Davis looks to rid himself of his fraud charges.
28	2	"The Feud"	January 8, 2007
Kris overworks herself trying to repay the Ritter family for her financial blunder; Matt and Dani compete for a new client. Kris and Junior become closer.
29	3	"Moving On"	January 15, 2007
After learning that Wildfire is sterile, Kris pushes to get him back on the track; Ken Davis Sr. tricks Gillian into selling her shares of Davis Farm to him.
30	4	"Close To Home"	January 22, 2007
After Kris's trailer burns down, her sense of independence is tested when she has to move in with the Ritter family.
31	5	"Love vs. Work"	January 29, 2007
Kris and the Ritter family struggle to come to terms how to deal with having their biggest opponent train at Raintree; Junior leaves to follow his rodeo dreams.
32	6	"Kiss, Kiss"	February 5, 2007
Kris is overcome by emotion when she helps Matt and Junior try to save Flame from being sold by Ken Davis; Dani takes a surprising step in her relationship with R.J.
33	7	"Push Me, Pull You"	February 12, 2007
Kris worries about her status at Raintree after Gillian moves in with Matt; a Davis family health scare brings Junior back to the ranch, much to Dani's dismay.
34	8	"The Goodbye"	February 19, 2007
With Raintree in dire financial straits, Jean and Matt's willingness to consider a buyer's offer draws criticism from Pablo and Kris; Junior and Gillian find common ground in their family histories.
35	9	"Heartless"	February 26, 2007
Gillian's romance with Matt is doomed; a tragic incident at the rodeo hits too close to home for Dani; Pablo considers a new career opportunity; Junior rethinks his working relationship with his father.
36	10	"Diplomacy"	March 5, 2007
As Kris and Matt's relationship heats up, they struggle with how to tell Junior about it; Dani tries to fight giving into the grief of losing R.J.; Jean visits Davis Farm for the first time since losing Pablo to them.
37	11	"You Can't Count On Me"	March 12, 2007
Kris's endeavors to get accustomed to her new surroundings are interrupted by a surprise visit from her half-brother, Jace, but she's suspicious of his sudden arrival.
38	12	"Picking Sides"	March 19, 2007
Matt and Junior's personal and professional rivalry heats up with the arrival of the Bristol Stakes; Kris aches to bring the two old friends back together but her attempts are aggravated by Gillian.
39	13	"So Long, Pardner"	March 26, 2007
Sheik Omar, Kris, Junior and Gillian enter into a deal for an illegal match race between Wildfire and Avatar that will test everyone's limits and leave the future hanging in uncertainty.

=== Season 4 (2008) ===
No. overall	No. in season	Title	Original release date
40	1	"The More Things Change: Part I"	January 21, 2008
The fourth season begins six months after Kris was forced out of Raintree, which has undergone significant operational changes that leave Matt pining for the past. Meanwhile, Dani is hard at work on a new business venture, and Junior mulls an important personal decision.
41	2	"The More Things Change: Part II"	January 28, 2008
After Kris unexpectedly returns for a glimpse of Wildfire's next race, she gains an unlikely ally and a place to stay. Meanwhile, Matt tries to cope with Raintree's new mission, and Junior ponders his decision to take the next step with Laura.
42	3	"Calm"	February 4, 2008
Jean and Pablo are adamant that Kris leave town instead of sticking around and helping to care for Wildfire; Junior reconnects with an old high-school classmate who could be the key to a financial windfall for the Davis ranch; Matt remains at odds with his mother about Raintree's dude-ranch transformation.
43	4	"Flames"	February 11, 2008
Kris and Junior help Matt with his improbable plan to get Raintree back in the horse-racing business, which involves finding Wildfire's offspring, Flame. Meanwhile, Wildfire's condition continues to improve at Dani's clinic.
44	5	"The Friend"	February 18, 2008
Junior's preoccupation with his and Calvin's business proposition takes time away from his wedding plans, but Laura suspects his loss of focus may have something to do with Kris. Meanwhile, Jean objects to Matt's plans for Raintree's adopted racehorses.
45	6	"Friendship/Passion"	February 25, 2008
The pressure is on Junior to decide whether or not to go through with his wedding to Laura after he and Kris share a moment of passion. Meanwhile, Dani considers pursuing a relationship with Noah, and Pablo mulls telling Jean how he feels about her.
46	7	"Commitment Issues"	March 3, 2008
When it appears that Flame is ready for his first race, Kris decides to fight to get her jockey's license reinstated. Meanwhile, an important professional decision for Pablo is clouded by an intensely personal matter.
47	8	"Life's Too Short"	March 10, 2008
Kris hopes that Flame's success in the DuPont Stakes might help Jean change her mind about Raintree's future, but Kris isn't so sure about what part, if any, she'll play in it. Meanwhile, Dani and Pablo urge Junior to fight for what he believes in.
48	9	"Vows"	April 28, 2008
Kris and Junior hastily decide to get married, but they're forced to postpone their plans when Jean is injured by one of the horses rescued by Matt, who is unnerved by Kris and Junior's impending wedding. Meanwhile, Dani's interest in racing is reignited after her father buys her a thoroughbred.
49	10	"The Comeback"	May 5, 2008
With Jean still out of commission, Kris and Matt do their best to run the dude ranch at Raintree while also preparing for the next race, which features Dani's new horse in the field. Later, Junior and Matt come to blows during a search for a pair of dude-ranch guests who got lost.
50	11	"Being Mrs. Junior"	May 12, 2008
Universal disapproval of Kris and Junior's wedding plans has everyone on edge, and even Kris wonders if she has what it takes to be part of the Davis family. Meanwhile, Dani's return to racing continues to be plagued by her father's interference.
51	12	"The Ties That Bind: Part I"	May 19, 2008
Before Kris gets one last race on Wildfire in the Tucker Stakes, she and Junior consider a once-in-a-lifetime opportunity to relocate to Alaska for a year to work on a geothermal project.
52	13	"The Ties That Bind: Part II"	May 26, 2008
In the series finale, Junior's schedule goes haywire when an urgent matter in Alaska that requires his attention coincides with Kris' ride on Wildfire in the Tucker Stakes and their wedding, but then a sudden surprise happens for Kris Furillo after the race.

== Home releases ==
Lionsgate Home Entertainment has released all four seasons on DVD in Region 1. The 4th season is available on Amazon on Build-on-demand DVD-R.

DVD title	Release date	Number of discs	Number of episodes
Wildfire: Season One	February 7, 2006	4	13
Wildfire: Season Two	November 6, 2007	3	13
Wildfire: Season Three	March 3, 2008	3	13
Wildfire: Season Four	July 11, 2012	4	13
