= Mark Wilkerson =

American musician

- Born: September 6, 1976 (age 49); Enterprise, Alabama, U.S.
- Genres: Alternative rock
- Occupations: Guitarist; singer
- Formerly of: Course of Nature; COG
- Spouse: Melissa Joan Hart (m. 2003)

Mark Wilkerson (born September 6, 1976) is an American musician, who was the lead singer and guitarist for rock band Course of Nature, previously known as COG.

Wilkerson co-wrote the song "It's Not Over" which was released as a single and as the opening track on the eponymous album by Daughtry. On December 6, 2007, the song earned him and the other co-writers a nomination for Best Rock Song for the 50th Annual Grammy Awards.

On May 3, 2007, Wilkerson gave a concert to help the relief efforts of Enterprise High School in Alabama, two months after a violent storm destroyed the school and killed eight students. Wilkerson is an alumnus of Enterprise High School.

== Personal life ==
On July 19, 2003, Wilkerson married actress Melissa Joan Hart, having met when Hart introduced the band at the Kentucky Derby in May 2002. They have three sons.

== Discography ==
=== Albums with COG ===
- No Time at All (2001)

=== Albums with Course of Nature ===
- Superkala (2002)
- Damaged (2008)

== Filmography ==
- Tying the Knot: The Wedding of Melissa Joan Hart [2003] [TV] ... Himself
- Sabrina, the Teenage Witch ... Himself

== Awards and nominations ==
Award
Best Rock Song for the 50th Annual Grammy Awards
Nominated for "It's Not Over"
