= My Fake Fiancé =

2009 American television film

- Promotional poster featuring Melissa Joan Hart and Joey Lawrence.
- Written by: Howard March
- Directed by: Gil Junger
- Starring: Melissa Joan Hart; Joey Lawrence
- Music by: Danny Lux
- Country of origin: United States
- Original language: English

Production
- Producer: Craig McNeil
- Running time: 90 minutes
- Budget: $5 million

Original release
- Network: ABC Family
- Release: April 19, 2009

My Fake Fiancé is a 2009 American television film starring Melissa Joan Hart and Joey Lawrence. It premiered on the ABC Family channel on April 19, 2009.

== Plot ==
Jennifer Verti has spent all of her savings buying her first house and all of her belongings have recently been stolen while trying to move into her new house. Vince is a ladies' man and a gambler, and owes money to a debt collector known as "The Monkey" (real name is Eugene). They meet at a wedding, initially Jennifer dislikes Vince and begins to predict what kind of person he is, and as a result, he dislikes her. However they talk about weddings and are amazed by the cash and gifts a couple get, and consider how easy it would be to get that kind of income. When Jennifer loses all her belongings along with the stolen moving van, she arranges to meet Vince for lunch and to suggest a fake romance and engagement, which he is very interested in going along with.

When her brother-in-law decides to sleep over at the hospital, Jennifer agrees to take their two children for the night. As the day progresses, Jennifer finds herself noticing how well Vince does with the kids. At nighttime, when the young boy asks Vince when he and his sister will get to go home, Vince, trying to make a joke, replies "never". The young boy starts to scream and Jennifer comes to calm him down and has the boy tell her a bedtime story. After the kids have fallen asleep, Vince goes to sleep in Jennifer's room on an air mattress which then springs a leak. She invites him to sleep on top of the covers on her bed, but the two just can't keep their hands off each other. The young boy then reveals to Vince that he won't be going to college because all of his and his sister's college money is being used to pay for the wedding. Vince realizes that this has gone too far and goes to see his estranged father. His father had recently hit it big at the race track and owed Vince some money. Vince's father tries to make amends on the past by paying him six-thousand dollars and Vince invites the latter to the wedding, as thanks. Instead of paying off his loan to "The Monkey", he uses the money to finance the wedding. He then tells the kids, "Looks like you're gonna have to go to college after all".

With Jennifer's feelings beginning to become confused, she begins to feel the weight of how important her marriage actually is to her family. At the wedding rehearsal, Jennifer's sister gives a heart felt speech, which drives Jennifer to leave the room. She confesses to Vince that she can't go through with this and can't marry a man who doesn't love her. Vince then reminds her of all that's at stake and she reluctantly agrees to go through with the wedding. At the wedding, Jennifer's sister gives Vince the wedding vows that Jennifer has written for him. Vince then writes his wedding vows and gives them to the sister.

As Vince and the groomsmen wait for Jennifer, she tries to tell her father that it's all a hoax and she can't go through with it. Her father keeps interrupting her and tells her how much he loves who she is and how he knows Vince will be a great husband. She reluctantly walks down the aisle and the preacher begins the sermon. As the preacher speaks, he talks about why two people get married, and when he mentions, "Some just want all the gifts". The two look at each other and laugh nervously while the rest of the congregation is laughing. When the preacher gives them a chance to read the vows, Vince begins to read the vows she wrote for him, but tears them up and speaks from the heart instead. This culminates in him telling her he really does love her.

== Cast ==
- Melissa Joan Hart as Jennifer
- Joey Lawrence as Vince
- Nicole Tubiola as Courtney
- Burgess Jenkins as Steve
- Diane Neal as Bonnie
- Jason MacDonald as David
- Steve Schirripa as Monkey
- Rhoda Griffis as Val
- Patricia French as Catherine
- Elizabeth Keener as Carmen
- Robert Pralgo as Ben
- Autumn Gruber as Samantha
- Andy Callaway as Jonathan
- Heather Holliday Richmond as Sales Clerk

== Home media ==
My Fake Fiancé was released on Region 1 DVD on April 20, 2010.

== Ratings ==
My Fake Fiancé premiered with big numbers for ABC Family. The movie premiered with over 3.6 million tuning in and another 2.8 tuning in for the encore.

The success of the film and the on-screen chemistry between Hart and Lawrence led ABC Family to commission a sitcom series starring the duo. Melissa & Joey premiered in August 2010.
