= Superkala =

Studio album by Course of Nature
- Released: February 26, 2002
- Genres: Post-grunge, alternative rock, hard rock
- Label: Lava/Atlantic
- Producers: Course Of Nature, Matt Martone

Course of Nature chronology
| Superkala (2002) | Damaged (2008) |

Singles from Superkala
- 1. "Caught in the Sun" Released: 2002; 2. "Wall of Shame" Released: 2002

Professional ratings
Review scores
| Source | Rating |
|---|---|
| Allmusic | 2.5/5 stars |

Superkala is the debut studio album from American alternative rock group Course of Nature. The album was released on February 26, 2002 and peaked at number 166 on the Billboard 200.

== Track listing ==
All songs written by Mark Wilkerson.

1. Wall of Shame – 3:59
2. Caught in the Sun – 4:51
3. Difference of Opinion – 4:02
4. Someone Else to You – 4:08
5. Remain – 3:09
6. Gain – 4:15
7. 1000 Times – 4:57
8. Could I've Been – 4:01
9. Better Part of Me – 4:21
10. After the Fall – 3:55

"Wall of Shame" was used in the 2002 racing video game Need for Speed: Hot Pursuit 2.

Additional personnel

- Randy Staub – mixing

== Charts ==
| Chart (2002) | Peak position |
|---|---|
| US Billboard 200 | 166 |
