= Course of Nature =

American alternative rock band

- Origin: Enterprise, Alabama
- Genres: Alternative rock Hard rock Post-grunge
- Years active: 2001–2011
- Labels: Silent Majority Group, Lava/Atlantic
- Past members: Mark Wilkerson; Sean Kipe; Jackson Eppley; Shane Lenzen O'Connell; John "Fish" Milldrum; Rick Shelton

Course of Nature was an American alternative rock band formed in Enterprise, Alabama in 2001, later based in Los Angeles. The band was co-founded by lead singer and rhythm guitarist Mark Wilkerson, with a final lineup of Sean Kipe (lead guitar), Jackson Eppley (bass) and Shane Lenzen O'Connell (drums).

== History ==
Mark Wilkerson and guitarist/bassist John "Fish" Milldrum formed Course of Nature after leaving Alabama band Cog, naming their new band after a song title from their previous band. The band originally played cover songs, but gradually developed and played their own material. They were joined by drummer Rick Shelton, formerly from Dust for Life.

During 2001, Course of Nature signed with Lava Records and recorded their first album, Superkala, which was produced by Matt Martone. The album was released in 2002, spawning the single "Caught in the Sun". After the album was released, Milldrum and Shelton left the band.

In 2007, Course of Nature signed with the Silent Majority records label, which released their second album, Damaged. The album was produced by David Bendeth, who produced albums for Hawthorne Heights, Breaking Benjamin and The Red Jumpsuit Apparatus, and was released on January 29, 2008. The album spawned a single, "Anger Cage" which was released on 22 January 2008.

As of 2009 the band consisted of Wilkerson on lead vocals and rhythm guitar, Sean Kipe on lead guitar, Jackson Eppley on bass, and Shane Lenzen O'Connell on drums.

Sean Kipe, then lead guitarist, announced via Facebook that they were in the studio working on new material as of January 30, 2010; however, in April 2010, Kipe announced that he now plays guitar for Alex Band.

Course of Nature released four demos on Jan. 24th, 2011 ("(Un) Happy", "The Bitter End", "Don't Pretend", and "I Miss You"), written by Sean Kipe and Mark Wilkerson. They are currently available on the band's MySpace profile.

Course of Nature broke up permanently without explanation shortly after the release of the 2011 demos.

== Albums ==
- No Time at All (2001, as COG)
- Superkala (2002)
- Damaged (2008)

== Singles ==
| Year | Title | Chart Positions | | | | Album |
| Year | Title | US Mainstream Rock | US Modern Rock | US Adult Top 40 | US Mainstream Top 40 | Album |
|---|---|---|---|---|---|---|
| 2002 | "Caught in the Sun" | 9 | 22 | 39 | 35 | Superkala |
| 2002 | "Wall of Shame" | 37 | — | — | — | Superkala |
| 2008 | "Anger Cage" | 35 | — | — | — | Damaged |
| 2008 | "The Window" | — | — | — | — | Damaged |
