= MasterChef (American TV series) season 5 =

Season of television series

MasterChef
- Season 5
- Promotional poster for season 5, featuring (L to R) Graham Elliot, Gordon Ramsay, and Joe Bastianich.
- Judges: Joe Bastianich; Graham Elliot; Gordon Ramsay
- No. of contestants: 22
- Winner: Courtney Lapresi
- Runner-up: Elizabeth Cauvel
- No. of episodes: 19

Release
- Original network: Fox
- Original release: May 26 – September 15, 2014

Season chronology
- ← Previous; Season 4 Next → Season 6

The fifth season of the American competitive reality television series MasterChef premiered on Fox on May 26, 2014.

The season concluded on September 15, 2014, with Courtney Lapresi as the winner, and Elizabeth Cauvel as the runner-up.

== Top 22 ==
Source for names, hometowns, and occupations. Ages and nicknames as given on air or stated in cites.

Contestant	Age	Hometown	Occupation	Status
Courtney Lapresi	25	Philadelphia, Pennsylvania	Aerial dancer	Winner September 15
Elizabeth Cauvel	31	Brooklyn, New York	Advertising Executive	Runner-Up September 15
Leslie Gilliams	56	Malibu, California	Stay-at-home Dad	Eliminated September 15
Joshua "Cutter" Brewer	33	Beaumont, Texas	Petroleum Landman	Eliminated September 8
Christian Green	29	New Orleans, Louisiana	Sales Rep	Eliminated September 8
Jaimee Vitolo	23	Queens, New York	Bakery Assistant	Eliminated September 1
Willie Mike	25	Houston, Texas	Church Music Director	Eliminated August 25
Daniel McGuffey	32	Los Angeles, California	Former Video Game Designer	Eliminated August 18
Ahran Cho	18	Palo Alto, California	High School Student	Eliminated August 11
Victoria Scroggins	35	San Angelo, Texas	Bartender	Eliminated August 11
Francis Legge	34	New York City, New York	Music Video Director	Eliminated August 4
Christine Silverstein	31	Yonkers, New York	Investment Director	Eliminated July 28
Elise Mayfield	28	Birmingham, Alabama	e-Learning Administrator	Eliminated July 21
Dan Wu	39	Lexington, Kentucky	Unemployed	Eliminated July 14
Francis Biondi	25	Orlando, Florida	Server	Eliminated July 7
Tyler Viars	27	Wilmington, Ohio	Hunting Sales Manager	Eliminated June 30
Jordan Kaminski	19	Muskego, Wisconsin	College Student	Eliminated June 23
Kira Novak	31	Youngstown, Ohio	Medical Recruiter	Eliminated June 16
Gordon Houston	30	Irvine, California	Law Student	Withdrew June 16
Stephani Syfax-Shepherd	25	Detroit, Michigan	Server	Eliminated June 9
Whitney Bray	28	Columbus, Ohio	Call Center Rep	Eliminated June 2
Astrid Lavenia	41	Mandeville, Louisiana	Food Sales Rep	Eliminated June 2

== Elimination table ==
Place	Contestant	Episode																											
Place	Contestant	2		3	4		5	6		7		8	9		10	11		12	13		14		15	16		17	18		19
1	Courtney	WIN	IMM	PT	IN	LOW	WIN	IN	WIN	IMM	IMM	WIN	HIGH	IN	WIN	IN	WIN	NPT	IN	IMM	WIN	IMM	PT	HIGH	WIN	WIN	IN	PT	WINNER
2	Elizabeth	IN	IMM	WIN	IN	IN	WIN	WIN	IMM	IN	IMM	WIN	HIGH	WIN	WIN	HIGH	IN	WIN	WIN	IMM	IN	IN	WIN	WIN	IMM	WIN	WIN	IMM	RUNNER-UP
3	Leslie	IN	IMM	PT	IN	WIN	PT	IN	IN	IN	IMM	PT	IN	IN	LOW	WIN	IMM	PT	WIN	IMM	HIGH	WIN	WIN	IN	LOW	PT	IN	ELIM	
4	Cutter	LOW	IMM	WIN	IN	LOW	WIN	IN	IN	LOW	LOW	LOW	IN	LOW	PT	IN	IN	WIN	LOW	PT	IN	IN	WIN	IN	HIGH	ELIM			
5	Christian	IN	IMM	NPT	HIGH	IN	NPT	IN	IN	LOW	PT	WIN	WIN	IMM	PT	IN	IN	NPT	IN	IMM	HIGH	LOW	LOW	HIGH	ELIM				
6	Jaimee	IN	IMM	PT	IN	IN	NPT	IN	IN	IN	IMM	WIN	IN	IN	WIN	IN	WIN	WIN	LOW	LOW	IN	WIN	ELIM						
7	Willie	HIGH	IN	WIN	IN	IN	WIN	IN	IN	IN	IMM	PT	IN	IN	PT	IN	LOW	WIN	LOW	PT	IN	ELIM							
8	Daniel	IN	IN	LOW	IN	IN	NPT	IN	IN	IN	IMM	NPT	IN	IN	WIN	IN	LOW	WIN	LOW	ELIM									
9	Ahran	IN	IMM	WIN	WIN	IMM	NPT	HIGH	IN	IN	IMM	WIN	IN	WIN	PT	IN	IN	ELIM											
9	Victoria	IN	IN	WIN	IN	IN	WIN	HIGH	IN	WIN	IMM	NPT	IN	IN	WIN	HIGH	IN	ELIM											
11	Francis L.	IN	IMM	WIN	IN	WIN	WIN	IN	IN	IN	IMM	NPT	IN	IN	WIN	IN	ELIM												
12	Christine	IN	IN	WIN	IN	IN	NPT	IN	IN	WIN	IMM	WIN	IN	IN	ELIM														
13	Elise	IN	IMM	LOW	IN	IN	WIN	IN	IN	IN	IMM	WIN	IN	ELIM															
14	Dan	IN	LOW	NPT	IN	IN	WIN	IN	IN	LOW	LOW	ELIM																	
15	Francis B.	IN	WIN	WIN	HIGH	IMM	LOW	IN	IN	LOW	ELIM																		
16	Tyler	IN	IN	WIN	IN	IN	NPT	IN	ELIM																				
17	Jordan	IN	IN	LOW	IN	IN	ELIM																						
18	Kira	IN	IMM	WIN	IN	ELIM																							
19	Gordon	IN	IMM	NPT	WDR																								
20	Stephani	IN	LOW	ELIM																									
21	Whitney	IN	ELIM																										
22	Astrid	ELIM																											

(WINNER) This cook won the competition.
(RUNNER-UP) This cook finished in second place.
(WIN) The cook won an individual challenge (Mystery Box Challenge or Elimination Test).
(WIN) The cook was on the winning team in the Team Challenge and directly advanced to the next round.
(HIGH) The cook was one of the top entries in the individual challenge but didn't win.
(IN) The cook wasn't selected as a top or bottom entry in an individual challenge.
(IN) The cook wasn't selected as a top or bottom entry in a team challenge.
(IMM) The cook didn't have to compete in that round of the competition and was safe from elimination.
(IMM) The cook was selected by Mystery Box Challenge winner and didn't have to compete in the Elimination Test.
(PT) The cook was on the losing team in the Team Challenge and competed in the Pressure Test, and advanced.
(NPT) The cook was on the losing team in the Team Challenge, did not compete in the Pressure Test, and advanced.
(LOW) The cook was one of the bottom entries in an individual challenge or Pressure Test, but advanced.
(LOW) The cook was one of the bottom entries in the Team Challenge, but advanced.
(WDR) The cook withdrew from the competition.
(ELIM) The cook was eliminated from MasterChef.

== Episodes ==
No. overall	No. in season	Title	Original release date	U.S. viewers (millions)
79	1	"Top 30 Compete"	May 26, 2014	4.26
Auditions Round 1: The top 30 contestants were each given an hour in which to cook their signature dishes and be awarded a MasterChef apron. They were also warned that anyone guilty of any severe errors during cooking would be eliminated immediately. The judges then tasted the dishes and awarded aprons to 17 contestants (Ahran, Christian, Christine, Courtney, Cutter, Dan, Daniel, Elizabeth, Francis B., Jaimee, Jordan, Kira, Stephani, Tyler, Victoria, Whitney, and Willie). The remaining 9 contestants (Amy, Astrid, Chandis, Corey, Elise, Francis L., Gordon, Leslie, and Michael) were all called down and told they would all get a second and final chance to advance to the next round.; Auditions Round 2: Each contestant was given another hour, along with a refrigerator full of common ingredients and a MasterChef staple box. When the hour was up, the dishes were tasted in three groups of three, where each contestant would either earn an apron or be sent home for good. In the first group, Gordon and Leslie advanced. In the second group, Astrid earned an apron, while Amy and Michael failed. In the third and final group, Francis L. earned an apron. Chandis was eliminated. Elise was then given the final apron.
80	2	"Top 22 Compete"	June 2, 2014	5.28
Mystery Box Challenge: The top 22 contestants were faced with their first Mystery box Challenge, which was dessert-based. Joe stated that at least one person will be eliminated at the end of this challenge. The cooks had 90 minutes to prepare their dishes. After the time was up, the judges selected Cutter, Astrid, Courtney, and Willie. Cutter and Astrid were deemed to have the worst dishes.; Bottom two: Astrid Lavenia and Cutter Brewer; Astrid was eliminated, while Courtney and Willie were then deemed to have the best two dishes. Courtney was named winner of the challenge.; Eliminated: Astrid Lavenia; Challenge Winner/Immune: Courtney Lapresi; Elimination Test: Courtney chose for everyone else to make meatloaf in the Elimination Test. She was also allowed to choose ten fellow contestants to receive immunity. She saved Leslie, Jaimee, Gordon, Elise, Cutter, Francis L., Kira, Ahran, Elizabeth, and Christian. The remaining ten had to make a meatloaf dish in 60 minutes. The judges awarded Francis B. the win and an advantage for the team challenge.; Immune: Ahran Cho, Christian Green, Cutter Brewer, Elise Mayfield, Elizabeth Cauvel, Francis Legge, Gordon Houston, Jaimee Vitolo, Kira Novak and Leslie Gilliams; Winner: Francis Biondi; Bottom three: Dan Wu, Stephani Syfax-Shepherd and Whitney Bray; Eliminated: Whitney Bray
81	3	"Top 20 Compete"	June 9, 2014	4.82
Team Challenge: The top 20 were brought to the Mojave Desert's U.S. Army base Fort Irwin to participate in their first team challenge of the season. Francis B. would be a team captain in this challenge and could choose his entire team. Leading the Red Team, he selected Cutter, Tyler, Victoria, Francis L., Willie, Christine, Elizabeth, Ahran and Kira. The remaining contestants (Christian, Courtney, Dan, Daniel, Elise, Gordon, Jaimee, Jordan, Leslie and Stephani) formed the Blue Team, and elected Daniel as their leader. Each team had to serve a meal consisting of one grilled meat, one sauce, and one side item to a group of 500 Army soldiers. The Red Team won with 329 votes, compared to the Blue Team's 171.; Team Challenge Winners/Immune: Ahran Cho, Christine Silverstein, Cutter Brewer, Elizabeth Cauvel, Francis Biondi, Francis Legge, Kira Novak, Tyler Viars, Victoria Scroggins and Willie Mike; Pressure Test: Daniel was told he could save three Blue Team members from the Pressure Test. He saved Christian, Gordon and Dan. The remaining seven members had 75 minutes to bake a perfect blueberry pie with a lattice crust. Daniel, Elise, Jordan and Stephani were chosen as the bottom contestants.; Immune: Christian Green, Dan Wu and Gordon Houston; Bottom four: Daniel McGuffey, Elise Mayfield, Jordan Kaminski and Stephani Syfax-Shepherd; Eliminated: Stephani Syfax-Shepherd
82	4	"Top 18 Compete"	June 16, 2014	5.24
Mystery Box Challenge: The judges announced that Gordon had withdrawn from the competition due to illness. The 18 remaining contestants were required to cook using a collection of live seafood. The top three dishes were Francis B.'s, Ahran's, and Christian's. Ahran's was declared the best, winning her the challenge.; Withdrew: Gordon Houston; Challenge Winner/Immune: Ahran Cho; Elimination Test: Ahran was allowed to choose the theme for the next challenge, which was based around sweet treats; she chose donuts. The others had to cook twelve donuts and present them in a box. After the challenge ended, Ahran was given a third advantage; picking a further contestant to be immune. She chose Francis B. The two best boxes of donuts were Leslie and Francis L., giving them the role of Team Captains in the next team challenge. Courtney, Cutter and Kira were announced as the bottom three.; Immune: Francis Biondi; Winners: Francis Legge and Leslie Gilliams; Bottom three: Courtney Lapresi, Cutter Brewer and Kira Novak; Eliminated: Kira Novak
83	5	"Top 17 Compete"	June 23, 2014	5.07
Team Challenge: The contestants were brought to a beach in southern California for a wedding party of 120 guests. Leslie captained the Red Team and chose Christian, Francis B., Tyler, Daniel, Christine, Ahran, Jordan and Jaimee. Francis L. picked Willie, Courtney, Cutter, Victoria, Elizabeth, Dan and Elise for his Blue Team. The teams had to cook a scallop starter and a sea bass entrée, which they had two hours to cook. The Blue Team were named the winners.; Team Challenge Winners/Immune: Courtney Lapresi, Cutter Brewer, Dan Wu, Elise Mayfield, Elizabeth Cauvel, Francis Legge, Victoria Scroggins and Willie Mike; Pressure Test: The nine members of the Red Team were told that six of them would be saved from the pressure test, and the judges would choose the three chefs who would not be saved. Gordon selected Leslie, Graham selected Jordan, and Joe selected Francis B. Ahran, Christian, Christine, Daniel, Jaimee and Tyler were therefore sent to safety. Leslie, Jordan and Francis B. had to cook a portion of steak frites, with the steak's temperature being medium rare. Leslie had the best steak frites and advanced.; Immune: Ahran Cho, Christian Green, Christine Silverstein, Daniel McGuffey, Jaimee Vitolo and Tyler Viars; Bottom two: Francis Biondi and Jordan Kaminski; Eliminated: Jordan Kaminski
84	6	"Top 16 Compete"	June 30, 2014	n/a
Mystery Box Challenge: Under the Mystery Box was 52 unlabeled aluminum cans containing various processed vegetables, fruit, meat and seafood. The cooks were tested on their ability to elevate cheap canned ingredients to restaurant-quality dishes. The top three were Elizabeth's, Victoria's, and Ahran's. Elizabeth was chosen as the winner and received the advantage in the next challenge.; Challenge Winner/Immune: Elizabeth Cauvel; Elimination Test: Season four winner Luca Manfè and MasterChef Junior season one winner Alexander Weiss returned to the MasterChef kitchen, each bearing one of their signature dishes. Luca presents a veal dish, while Alexander had made a passion fruit panna cotta. For her advantages, Elizabeth selects who cooks which dish. Elizabeth assigns the panna cotta to Cutter, Christian, Jaimee, Christine, Ahran, Francis B., Victoria and Tyler, leaving Courtney, Dan, Daniel, Elise, Francis L., Leslie, and Willie to cook Luca's veal. When Tyler is called on to present his panna cotta, Gordon reveals that he took Jaimee's third panna cotta out of the blast chiller rather than his own. Tyler is immediately eliminated for not serving his own meal to the judges.; Winner: Courtney Lapresi; Eliminated: Tyler Viars
85	7	"Top 15 Compete"	July 7, 2014	n/a
Team Challenge: The judges informed the contestants that they will be working in pairs. The bottom two pairs would then have to face the Pressure Test. Courtney had the advantage of choosing the teams and was also safe from elimination. Courtney paired up: Christian and Francis B., Cutter and Dan, Jaimee and Elizabeth, Willie and Daniel, Victoria and Christine, Ahran and Leslie, and Francis L. and Elise. The pairs had to cook a surf and turf dish with one hour of cooking time. Christine and Victoria's dish was deemed best of the night. Christian/Francis B. and Cutter/Dan were named as the bottom two teams and were therefore sent into the Pressure Test. Every other team advanced.; Immune: Courtney Lapresi; Team Challenge Winners/Immune: Christine Silverstein and Victoria Scroggins; Immune: Ahran Cho, Daniel McGuffey, Elise Mayfield, Elizabeth Cauvel, Francis Legge, Jaimee Vitolo, Leslie Gilliams and Willie Mike; Pressure Test: Christian, Cutter, Dan and Francis B. had to make six spring rolls with a dipping sauce. Christian had the best spring rolls and advanced.; Bottom three: Cutter Brewer, Dan Wu and Francis Biondi; Eliminated: Francis Biondi
86	8	"Top 14 Compete"	July 14, 2014	n/a
Team Challenge: This Restaurant Takeover took place at Dinah's Family Restaurant in Culver City, California. The judges selected the two team captains themselves from among the cooks who had not previously been team captains: Christine and Willie. The teams would be boys versus girls, with captains as expediters, but both teams could choose a member of the opposite sex to join them. Christian and Victoria were chosen to switch places. Christine's Red Team received more tips with $87 compared to $82 for Willie's Blue Team, winning the challenge.; Team Challenge Winners/Immune: Ahran Cho, Christian Green, Christine Silverstein, Courtney Lapresi, Elise Mayfield, Elizabeth Cauvel and Jaimee Vitolo; Pressure Test: Willie was given two options: save three members from his team or save himself and let everyone else cook. He chose to compete in the pressure test and save Daniel, Francis, and Victoria. Cutter, Dan, Leslie and Willie had to bake a three-layer red velvet cake. Willie and Leslie advanced leaving Cutter and Dan in the bottom two.; Immune: Daniel McGuffey, Francis Legge and Victoria Scroggins; Bottom two: Cutter Brewer and Dan Wu; Eliminated: Dan Wu
87	9	"Top 13 Compete"	July 21, 2014	n/a
Mystery Box Challenge: The contestants are tasked with creating a dish using Alaskan king salmon in sixty minutes. The top three dishes were Christian's, Courtney's, and Elizabeth's. Christian is named the winner of the challenge.; Challenge Winner/Immune: Christian Green; Elimination Test: The judges select some of their favorite ingredients, and Christian selects Joe's Italian-themed basket for the other contestants to prepare in another sixty minutes. Christian also get to choose which contestant will only have thirty minutes to cook their dish; he chooses Courtney. The judges named the dishes by Elizabeth and Ahran the best, making them team captains for the next team challenge. Cutter and Elise were named the bottom two.; Winners: Ahran Cho and Elizabeth Cauvel; Bottom two: Cutter Brewer and Elise Mayfield; Eliminated: Elise Mayfield
88	10	"Top 12 Compete"	July 28, 2014	n/a
Team Challenge: The top twelve have to create romantic dinners for seventeen couples, including Gordon and his wife Tana. Elizabeth chooses Francis, Jaimee, Victoria, Courtney, and Daniel for the Blue Team, while Ahran takes Willie, Christine, Christian, Leslie, and is left with Cutter for the Red Team. The Blue Team wins with more than 75% of the votes.; Team Challenge Winners/Immune: Courtney Lapresi, Daniel McGuffey, Elizabeth Cauvel, Francis Legge, Jaimee Vitolo and Victoria Scroggins; Pressure Test The Red Team was required to make nine chocolate truffles with at least three different flavors. Christine and Leslie were named for the bottom.; Bottom two: Christine Silverstein and Leslie Gilliams; Eliminated: Christine Silverstein
89	11	"Top 11 Compete"	August 4, 2014	5.41
Mystery Box Challenge: The judges provided the remaining home cooks with two Mystery Boxes: one containing everyday ingredients, and another containing more fancy high-end version of the same ingredients, and the chefs were allowed to pick which box they would use to make their dish. The top three consisted of Elizabeth's, Victoria's, and Leslie's. Leslie's dish won the challenge.; Challenge Winner/Immune: Leslie Gilliams; Elimination Test: Leslie got to pick between three different types of stuffed pasta: he chose Graham's caramelle, and the chefs had one hour to make their dish. Leslie also had the advantage of removing one chef's pasta machine and make them use a rolling pin to make their pasta; he chose Daniel. The top two dishes belong to Jaimee and Courtney, making them team captains for next week's Team Challenge, while Daniel, Francis L. and Willie were at the bottom.; Winners: Courtney Lapresi and Jaimee Vitolo; Bottom three: Daniel McGuffey, Francis Legge and Willie Mike; Eliminated: Francis Legge
90	12	"Top 10 Compete"	August 11, 2014	5.40
Team Challenge:: The top ten arrive at a football stadium. Jaimee gets to pick first, but Gordon tells her that she will instead be picking Courtney's team and vice versa. Jaimee chooses Leslie, Christian, Ahran and Victoria for Courtney's Blue Team, and Courtney chooses Cutter, Daniel, Willie and Elizabeth for Jaimee's Red Team. The teams must create two dishes of a turkey burger and fish tacos to be served in a concession stand to hundreds of people attending the football game. The Red Team won the challenge with 51% of the votes.; Team Challenge Winners/Immune: Cutter Brewer, Daniel McGuffey, Elizabeth Cauvel, Jaimee Vitolo and Willie Mike; Pressure Test: Courtney saves herself from the Pressure Test. The judges also save Christian. Ahran, Leslie, and Victoria have one hour to make a ceviche, a prawn tempura, and stuffed prawns, being told that two of them will be eliminated.; Immune: Christian Green and Courtney Lapresi; Bottom three: Ahran Cho, Leslie Gilliams and Victoria Scroggins; Eliminated: Ahran Cho and Victoria Scroggins
91	13	"Top 8 Compete"	August 18, 2014	5.83
Team Challenge: The contestants split into four teams of two (Christian and Courtney, Cutter and Willie, Daniel and Jaimee, and Elizabeth and Leslie). The objective was to take a cut of chicken and create a dish with it. Cutter and Willie got the breast, Courtney and Christian got the thigh, Daniel and Jaimee got the wings, and Elizabeth and Leslie got the oysters. Elizabeth and Leslie had the best dish. Christian and Courtney also advanced.; Team Challenge Winners/Immune: Elizabeth Cauvel and Leslie Gilliams; Immune: Christian Green and Courtney Lapresi; Pressure Test Part 1: This pressure test was broken down into three smaller tests, with the best performer in each test being sent to safety. All three tests had eggs as the main ingredient, and the first one required the four contestants to poach an egg. Willie advanced.; Safe: Willie Mike; Pressure Test Part 2: This part of the test required the contestants to each make an egg yolk ravioli. Cutter managed to make the best ravioli of the three, saving him from elimination.; Safe: Cutter Brewer; Bottom two: Daniel McGuffey and Jaimee Vitolo; Pressure Test Part 3: Lastly, Daniel and Jaimee had to make a cheese soufflé. Jaimee had the better soufflé, eliminating Daniel.; Eliminated: Daniel McGuffey
92	14	"Top 7 Compete"	August 25, 2014	5.47
Mystery Box Challenge: The top seven found their Mystery Boxes to be full of apples, but were told the dish they cooked had to be an entrée. The best three dishes were Christian's, Leslie's, and Courtney's. Courtney's dish was declared the winner.; Challenge Winner/Immune: Courtney Lapresi; Team Challenge: The contestants were grouped into teams of two for a relay challenge. The teams would be required to prepare five dim sum dishes. Courtney got to pick the teams. She paired Cutter with Elizabeth, Christian with Willie, and Jaimee with Leslie. Jaimee and Leslie were deemed the winners and sent to safety first. Cutter and Elizabeth were also safe.; Winners: Jaimee Vitolo and Leslie Gilliams; Immune: Cutter Brewer and Elizabeth Cauvel; Bottom two: Christian Green and Willie Mike; Eliminated: Willie Mike
93	15	"Top 6 Compete"	September 1, 2014	n/a
Team Challenge: The top six will prepare dinner at a restaurant under the supervision of Gordon and Graham, with Gordon expediting. Jaimee captained the Blue Team and chose Christian and Courtney to join her, while Red Team captain Leslie chose Elizabeth and was left with Cutter. The following morning, the Red Team were named winners.; Team Challenge Winners/Immune: Cutter Brewer, Elizabeth Cauvel and Leslie Gilliams; Pressure Test: Christian, Courtney, and Jaimee had to create a croquembouche in 90 minutes. Courtney had the best dish.; Winner: Courtney Lapresi; Bottom two: Christian Green and Jaimee Vitolo; Eliminated: Jaimee Vitolo
94	16	"Top 5 Compete"	September 8, 2014	n/a
Mystery Box Challenge: In this challenge, the top five met their loved ones, and were then asked to create and elevate their loved ones' favorite dish. Courtney's, Christian's, and Elizabeth's were named the top three dishes, and Elizabeth won.; Challenge Winner/Immune: Elizabeth Cauvel; Elimination Test: Elizabeth got the opportunity to assign an offal protein to each remaining contestant. Elizabeth gave buffalo testicles to Courtney, veal brains to Christian, lamb tongue to Leslie and ox heart to Cutter. Courtney's dish was the winner. Cutter was also deemed safe.; Winner: Courtney Lapresi; Bottom two: Christian Green and Leslie Gilliams; Eliminated: Christian Green
95	17	"Top 4 Compete"	September 8, 2014	n/a
Team Challenge: The final four cooks were divided into two pairs. Courtney chose Elizabeth as her teammate on the Red Team, leaving Cutter and Leslie as the Blue Team. Each pair had to choose a box of ingredients from one of their home states. Courtney and Elizabeth chose Pennsylvania, and Leslie and Cutter chose Texas. Each pair then had to make an appetizer and an entrée based on what was in their box. Courtney and Elizabeth were narrowly judged as the winners, leaving Cutter and Leslie going head to head in the pressure test.; Team Challenge Winners/Immune: Courtney Lapresi and Elizabeth Cauvel; Bottom two: Cutter Brewer and Leslie Gilliams; Pressure Test: Cutter and Leslie were assigned to a California box of ingredients, and the judges introduced three different dishes they would make from those ingredients. The challenge was to replicate all three dishes in ninety minutes, with each judge evaluating who did a better job of replicating it. Leslie defeated Cutter by two dishes to one, eliminating him and advancing to the final three.; Eliminated: Cutter Brewer
96	18	"Top 3 Compete"	September 15, 2014	n/a
Individual Challenge: Gordon informed the final three that their final challenge would consist of creating a dish for 50 chefs representing the 50 states in only 90 minutes to secure a spot in the final. The cook with the best dish would directly advance to the final, and the bottom two would compete in the season's final Pressure Test. Six of the seven prior eliminated cooks returned to help out the finalists. Picking at random, Leslie got the help of Ahran and Christian, Courtney got Daniel and Willie, and Elizabeth got Jaimee and Victoria. Elizabeth won with 39 votes out of 50, advancing to the final two.; Challenge Winner/Immune: Elizabeth Cauvel; Bottom two: Courtney Lapresi and Leslie Gilliams; Pressure Test: Courtney and Leslie had to make three different cakes from three different regions in America within two hours. The judges deemed Courtney to have the better cakes, advancing her to the final two and eliminating Leslie.; Eliminated: Leslie Gilliams
97	19	"Winner Chosen"	September 15, 2014	n/a
Season finale: The top two, Courtney and Elizabeth, had to each create an appetizer, an entrée, and a dessert.; Appetizer: Courtney made a crispy pig's ear with dandelion and fennel salad. Elizabeth made a grilled octopus with chickpea and chorizo salad.; Entrée: Courtney made a sumac duck breast with spring vegetables and farro, while Elizabeth made a spiced rack of lamb with red quinoa and carrot purée.; Dessert: Courtney made a cherry meringue with salted chocolate and almonds. Elizabeth made a grapefruit and olive oil semolina cake with poached plums and ground pistachio.; Final two: Courtney Lapresi and Elizabeth Cauvel; Winner Revealed: Courtney was named the winner of MasterChef US 2014, winning a $250,000 cash prize and a cookbook deal.; MasterChef Winner: Courtney Lapresi
