= Virginie Le Brun =

New Zealand actress

- Born: 7 June 1980 (age 46); New Zealand
- Occupation: Actress

Virginie Le Brun (born 7 June 1980) is a New Zealand actress best known for her role as Dr. Gabrielle Jacobs in the TV series Shortland Street. She is the daughter of French parents, vintners Adele and Daniel Le Brun.

She played Elizabeth Frankenstein, the wife of Victor Frankenstein, in Stuart Beattie's 2014 film, I, Frankenstein.

== Filmography ==
=== Films ===
Year	Films	Role	Notes
2014	I, Frankenstein	Elizabeth Frankenstein	
2005	Tyrannical Love	Lisa	

=== Television ===
Year	TV Series	Role	Notes
2014	INXS: Never Tear Us Apart	Lysette	
2012	Neighbours	Jenny Earl	
2009-2012	Shortland Street	Gabrielle Jacobs	
2006	Stage Challenge	Host	
2005	What Now	Host	
1998	Choice!	Host	
1998	Fresh Juice	Host	

=== Short films ===
Year	Short Films	Role	Notes
2012	Night Storm	Mother	
2010	Wonderland Hospital	Nurse Lucy Lovejoy	
2007	Bloody Vengeance 2	The Poon	
