= Kieren Hutchison =

New Zealand actor

- Born: Kieren Robert Hutchison; 9 October 1974 (age 52); Auckland, New Zealand
- Occupation: Television actor
- Years active: 1993–present
- Spouse: Nicole Tubiola
- Website: www.kierenhutchison.com

Kieren Robert Hutchison (born 9 October 1974) is a New Zealand actor. He was born in Auckland, New Zealand.

== Career ==
Hutchison is best known for playing the roles of Jonathon McKenna in the New Zealand soap opera Shortland Street, Andy Hargrove on One Tree Hill, and Jake Preston on Monarch Cove (2006). He played Ernst Robinson on The Adventures of Swiss Family Robinson (1997) and William Tell on The Legend of William Tell (1998).

He is the creator of the YouTube channel "A Kid Explains History." As of 2022, it has 25,000 subscribers and over 4 million views.

== Personal life ==
He is married to actress Nicole Tubiola with whom he has a son.

== Filmography ==
Film
Year	Film	Role	Other notes
1993	Shortland Street	Dr. Jonathon McKenna	1993–96, 2011
1995	Riding High	Steven Brighton	27 episodes
1995	Xena: Warrior Princess	Talis	1 episode
1998	The Adventures of Swiss Family Robinson	Ernst Robinson	30 episodes
1998	Young Hercules	Orpheus	3 episodes
1998	The Legend of William Tell	William Tell	16 episodes
2000	Cleopatra 2525	Johnny	1 episode
2001	No One Can Hear You	Robert Player	
2004	Charmed	Mitch	1 episode
2004	One Tree Hill	Andy Hargrove	2004–08; 19 episodes
2006	Sea of Fear	Tom	
2006	Monarch Cove	Jake Preston	14 episodes
2006	Wildfire	Kerry Connelly	2006–07; 11 episodes
2008	Polar Opposites	Dr. Bradley	TV movie
2009	Flower Girl	Stephen Banks	TV movie
2009	Ghost Whisperer	Jack Pimsler	1 episode
2010	CSI: NY	Finnegan Hansard	1 episode
2010	Castle	Cody Donnelly	1 episode
2013	Grimm	Andre	1 episode
2014	Perfect On Paper	Bob Lewis	TV movie
2017	Ryan Hansen Solves Crimes on Television	Edison Owner	1 episode
2019	Who Stole My Daughter?	Tim Sullivan	TV movie
