= Boy Meets World season 3 =

Boy Meets World
- Season 3
- Season 3 DVD cover
- Starring: Ben Savage; William Daniels; Betsy Randle; Will Friedle; Rider Strong; Danielle Fishel; Alex Désert; Anthony Tyler Quinn; William Russ
- No. of episodes: 22

Release
- Original network: ABC
- Original release: September 22, 1995 – May 17, 1996

Season chronology
- ← Previous; Season 2 Next → Season 4

The third season of the television comedy series Boy Meets World aired between September 22, 1995, and May 17, 1996, on ABC in the United States. The season was produced by Michael Jacobs Productions and Touchstone Television with series creator Michael Jacobs as executive producer. It was broadcast as part of the ABC comedy block TGIF on Friday evenings. This is the first season to have Lindsay Ridgeway as Morgan Matthews.

== Cast ==
=== Main ===
- Ben Savage as Cory Matthews
- William Daniels as George Feeny
- Betsy Randle as Amy Matthews
- Will Friedle as Eric Matthews
- Rider Strong as Shawn Hunter
- Danielle Fishel as Topanga Lawrence
- Alex Désert as Eli Williams
- Anthony Tyler Quinn as Jonathan Turner
- William Russ as Alan Matthews

=== Recurring ===
- Lindsay Ridgeway as Morgan Matthews

== Episodes ==
Boy Meets World Season 3 Episodes
| No. overall | No. in season | Title | Directed by | Written by | Original release date | Prod. code | Viewers (millions) |
|---|---|---|---|---|---|---|---|
| 46 | 1 | "My Best Friend's Girl" | John Tracy | Jeff C. Sherman | September 22, 1995 | B646 | 19.8 |
A new school year has started. Eric continues to worry about college, so he steps in as president of the Film Club, and must sell tickets to an unpopular film. Frankie and Joey make a deal with Eric to sell tickets if they can have a cut of the profits. Meanwhile, Cory has his heart set on asking Topanga out, but he cannot get the nerve to do so. Unfortunately, his reluctance costs him when Shawn informs him that he has already asked her out. Eli (Alex Désert) comes to at Jonathan Turner's apartment just seconds before Cory shows up, demanding to see Shawn. The four talk about whether or not it is against the "gentlemen's code" to ask out a guy's best friend's girl, and then Cory storms out after Shawn decisively says that Topanga was single. Cory stresses and asks Amy if opposites attract, and Eric steps to have a brother-to-brother moment and suggests that he ask Topanga's best friend, Trini, how Topanga really feels about Shawn. Trini mistakes this for Cory asking her out and Cory concedes. Eric's movie screening is successful under Frankie and Joey. The two pairs, Cory and Trini, and Shawn and Topanga, sit next to each other. Shawn asking Topanga out turns out to be a set-up for Cory and her to become a couple. Guest stars: Blake Soper as Joey, Brittany Murphy as Trini, Ethan Suplee as Frankie Notes: Cory's voice is now much deeper than it was in the previous seasons. Lily Nicksay leaves the main cast and Alex Désert joins the main cast. Absent: William Russ as Alan Matthews
| 47 | 2 | "The Double Lie" | Jeff McCracken | Matthew Nelson | September 29, 1995 | B648 | 17.2 |
Shawn has a hot date for the weekend, but those plans are quickly derailed when Jonathan tells Shawn that he'll be out of town for the weekend. However, Shawn refuses to break off his date, and ends up taking her to Jonathan's apartment – where he finds a big surprise. Guest stars: Erin J. Dean as Veronica, Lisa Wilcox as Kris Absent: Danielle Fishel as Topanga Lawrence, Alex Désert as Eli Williams
| 48 | 3 | "What I Meant to Say" | David Kendall | Mark Blutman & Howard Busgang | October 13, 1995 | B647 | 15.4 |
When Cory tells Topanga "I love you", he earns the ill will of nearly everyone he knows; Shawn and Eric know that every girl in the school will now expect to hear those same three words. But, more importantly, Topanga also seems very upset about it, and decides to break things off with Cory with no explanation. Guest star: Anastasia Horne as Christi Absent: William Russ as Alan Matthews
| 49 | 4 | "He Said, She Said" | Jeff McCracken | Jeff Menell | October 20, 1995 | B649 | 16.9 |
Shawn takes the new guidance counselor's advice too literally, and decides to run away to Europe. One-time school bully Harley Keiner returns from reform school to face-off with his replacement, Griff. Guest stars: Danny McNulty as Harley Keiner, Blake Soper as Joey, Amy Leland as Devon, Adam Scott as Griff Hawkins, Ethan Suplee as Frankie, Carmen Filipi as Bum Absent: Danielle Fishel as Topanga Lawrence
| 50 | 5 | "Hometown Hero" | John Tracy | Matthew Nelson | October 27, 1995 | B652 | 13.8 |
Cory and Shawn sneak into the chemistry lab, and accidentally start a fire – which Cory also puts out. However, he gets more than he bargained for when he is labeled "a hero". Will Cory do the right thing and tell the truth, or will he let people continue to think he's something he's not? Guest stars: Deborah Harmon as Connie, Bob Larkin as Janitor Bud, Jim Jansen as Dr. Sorrell, Michael Hanniff as Tommy, Joey Gaynor as Crew Guy, Yolanda Gaskins as Sharon
| 51 | 6 | "This Little Piggy" | Jeff McCracken | Mark Blutman & Howard Busgang | November 3, 1995 | B653 | 16.7 |
Eric is having aspirations of attending Yale. Will Feeny support this insane endeavor? Meanwhile, Shawn decides to keep an abandoned pig as a pet, but Topanga feels that an apartment is not a proper environment for a hog. Will Cory side with his best friend or his girlfriend? Guest star: Richard Karn as Victor Absent: Alex Désert as Eli Williams
| 52 | 7 | "Truth and Consequences" | Jeff McCracken | Donna Trujillo | November 10, 1995 | B651 | 16.8 |
Cory and Shawn soil Janitor Bud's reputation when they produce a videotaped report on time-clock fraud for a media-arts class project. But the result is not what they planned – Mr. Feeny must fire Janitor Bud, a move that makes Cory and Shawn unpopular with the rest of the student body. Guest stars: Blake Soper as Joey, Kathy Trageser as Monique, Bob Larkin as Janitor Bud
| 53 | 8 | "Rave On" | David Trainer | Jeff C. Sherman | November 17, 1995 | B655 | 16.6 |
Eric and Cory decide to throw a rave, but they pick the worst possible date to have a party: the same day as their parents' 20th wedding anniversary. Guest stars: Micky Dolenz as Gordy, Davy Jones as Reginald, Peter Tork as Jedediah Lawrence, Ethan Suplee as Frankie, David Madden as The Manager, Veronica De La Cruz as Marisa Absent: Alex Désert as Eli Williams
| 54 | 9 | "The Last Temptation of Cory" | David Trainer | Susan Meyers & Judy Toll | December 1, 1995 | B650 | 13.0 |
While Topanga is sick, Cory becomes the object of a pretty girl's insistent affections. Will he give in to temptation? Meanwhile, Eric spends his money in a get-rich-quick scheme. Does he have a piece of valuable baseball memorabilia, or just a piece of junk? Guest stars: Brittany Murphy as Trini, Elisabeth Harnois as Missy, Gil Stratton as Announcer, Lindsey McKeon as Libby, Andrew Magarian as Bagwell
| 55 | 10 | "Train of Fools" | Jeff McCracken | Susan Meyers & Judy Toll | December 15, 1995 | B656 | 17.4 |
Due to circumstances they would prefer to forget, Eric, Cory, Shawn, and Topanga celebrate New Year's Eve in a stranded subway car. Guest stars: Angela Visser as Rebecca-Alexa, Wendy Pitts as Janine, Brooke Theiss Genesse as Valerie, Wesley Jonathan as T.J., Dawn Maxey as Lynn, Charisma Carpenter as Caterer
| 56 | 11 | "City Slackers" | Jeff McCracken | Kevin Kelton | January 5, 1996 | B654 | 19.6 |
Cory and Shawn sneak off to Mr. Feeny's mountain cabin for a weekend of fun, but as to be expected, they're caught in the act. Meanwhile, Eric and Frankie engage in a marathon billiards match. Guest stars: Blake Soper as Joey, Troy Evans as Ranger Mark, Ethan Suplee as Frankie, Julie Benz as Bianca Absent: Danielle Fishel as Topanga Lawrence
| 57 | 12 | "The Grass Is Always Greener" | Jeff McCracken | Donna Trujillo | January 12, 1996 | B658 | 19.3 |
Feeling uncomfortably domesticated, Cory forsakes a date with Topanga for a "boys' night out" at another school's party, and is mistaken for Shawn – an error he fails to correct when he sees how popular it makes him. However, Cory is surprised to find that he's not the only one there pretending to be someone else. Guest stars: Jim Jansen as Dr. Sorrell, Aeryk Egan as Brent, Marisa Theodore as Tara, Mena Suvari as Hilary Absent: William Russ as Alan Matthews
| 58 | 13 | "New Friends and Old" | John Tracy | Matthew Nelson | January 19, 1996 | B659 | 17.6 |
Mr. Feeny asks Cory and Shawn to take school tough-guy Frankie under their wing, and they discover his reputation makes the younger students their willing slaves. Also, Jonathan's wealthy ex-girlfriend re-enters his life. Guest stars: Leon Allen White as Francis "Frankie" Sr., Eliza Coyle as Melanie, Ethan Suplee as Frankie, Adam Wylie as Robert Absent: William Russ as Alan Matthews
| 59 | 14 | "A Kiss Is More Than a Kiss" | John Tracy | Michael Swerdlick | January 26, 1996 | B660 | 18.7 |
At Shawn's urging, Cory re-enters the dating world, but he cannot bring himself to kiss his date, Melissa, because he's still in love with Topanga – but she's too busy locking lips with another guy. Guest stars: Lindsay Ridgeway as Morgan Matthews, Anndi McAfee as Melissa, Adena Panella as Katie, Sadie Kratzig as Felicia, Shane West as Nick Note: Morgan returns in this episode but is now portrayed by a different actress, Lindsay Ridgeway.
| 60 | 15 | "The Heart is a Lonely Hunter" | Jeff McCracken | Kevin Kelton | February 2, 1996 | B661 | 18.6 |
Shawn's "bad boy" image costs him a date with a "nice girl", so he recruits Cory to teach him how to be "boyfriend material". Meanwhile, Eric tries to land an internship at a local TV station. Guest stars: Brandon Maggart as Pat, Larisa Oleynik as Dana, Kimberly Scott as Sonja, Lindsay Ridgeway as Morgan Matthews, Danny Strong as Arthur
| 61 | 16 | "Stormy Weather" | Jeff McCracken | Jeff Menell | February 9, 1996 | B662 | 16.4 |
Eric's devotion to the TV station is affecting his grades, and endangering his chances of graduating. He temporarily subs in for weatherman, Cal, planning to drop out of school for this position. Meanwhile, things start to heat up between Jonathan and Dana's mom, Susan – to Shawn and Dana's horror. Eventually, the news station manager tells him that they have found a replacement for the weatherman, and that the news internship is only available to students. Eric and Alan make up, and Eric returns to Feeny's class. Shawn and Dana spot Jonathan on a date with Dana's aunt. Guest stars: Brandon Maggart as Pat, Larisa Oleynik as Dana, Rosalind Allen as Susan, John O'Hurley as Cal, Lindsay Ridgeway as Morgan Matthews, Matt Kirkwood as Stage Manager Absent: Danielle Fishel as Topanga Lawrence
| 62 | 17 | "The Pink Flamingo Kid" | Jeff McCracken | Mark Blutman & Howard Busgang | February 16, 1996 | B657 | 17.1 |
While filming a video for Shawn to give as a birthday gift to Chet, Cory catches some criminals red-handed, and wants to enter a TV news contest. Shawn objects and destroys the tape. The two fight, and Cory ends up returning to the trailer park where he is met with trouble. Meanwhile, a money-hungry Eric attempts to find valuable objects amongst his parents' "old junk" after hearing about Mr. Feeny's pawn shop experience. Absent: Danielle Fishel as Topanga Lawrence
| 63 | 18 | "Life Lessons" | Jeff McCracken | Jeff C. Sherman | February 23, 1996 | B663 | 18.9 |
Cory's classmates are antagonized by Mr. Feeny's harsh exam schedule, and decide to retaliate by vandalizing his home. Meanwhile, Eric dates an older woman, whom his mother was hoping to fix up with Mr. Turner. Guest stars: Lisa Akey as Brenda, Aaron Michael Metchik as Jake, Patrick Renna as Kyle, Ian Bohen as Denny, Anatasia Horne as Christy Absent: Alex Désert as Eli Williams
| 64 | 19 | "I Was a Teenage Spy" | David Trainer | Jeff C. Sherman | April 26, 1996 | B665 | 13.2 |
Cory gets a shock when a microwave mishap transports him back to the 1950s, where his post-Cold War knowledge of Russian space experiments gets him mistaken for a spy. With the help of Shawnzy (Shawn) and T.L. (Topanga), he avoids capture and makes his way back to present day. Special guest stars: Tom Bosley as himself, Pat Morita as Wise Man, Anson Williams as himself Guest stars: Lindsay Ridgeway as Morgan Matthews, Christopher Darga as Counterman, Don Sparks as Deputy
| 65 | 20 | "I Never Sang For My Legal Guardian" | David Trainer | Kevin Kelton | May 3, 1996 | B664 | 11.4 |
Jonathan decides he's finally ready to assume responsibility as Shawn's legal guardian, but Shawn only wants to be with his father, Chet. Cory and Topanga search for Chet, but Cory becomes distracted when he catches the attention of a woman. Meanwhile, Mr. Feeny strong-arms Eric into tutoring the school's star athlete, Jeff. Guest stars: Blake Clark as Chet Hunter, Bobbie Phillips as Louanne, Bobby Jacoby as Jeff, Frank Novak as Desk Sergeant, Cindy A. Lora as Anita
| 66 | 21 | "The Happiest Show on Earth" | Jeff McCracken | Mark Blutman & Howard Busgang | May 10, 1996 | B666 | 12.2 |
Cory cannot keep his mind off Topanga, and tries to woo her by following her to Walt Disney World, but Topanga becomes angry because she believes he traveled all that way for another girl, Kristen. Special guest star: Debbe Dunning as Alexandra Guest stars: Andrew Keegan as Ronnie, Hillary Tuck as Kristen, Lindsay Ridgeway as Morgan Matthews, Staci Keanan as Dana Absent: Alex Désert as Eli Williams
| 67 | 22 | "Brother Brother" | Jeff McCracken | Mark Blutman & Howard Busgang | May 17, 1996 | B667 | 12.2 |
Cory dreads his upcoming summer vacation when he realizes that Topanga's going to camp, Shawn's traveling with his father, and Eric's leaving for college – until he receives a letter stating that he didn't get into his college of choice. Eric then decides to take a cross country trip – and invites Cory along for the ride. Final Appearance of Alex Désert as Eli Williams Guest star: Lindsay Ridgeway as Morgan Matthews
