= Boy Meets World season 1 =

Boy Meets World
- Season 1
- Season 1 DVD cover
- Starring: Ben Savage; William Daniels; Betsy Randle; Will Friedle; Rider Strong; Lee Norris; Lily Nicksay; William Russ
- No. of episodes: 22

Release
- Original network: ABC
- Original release: September 24, 1993 – May 13, 1994

Season chronology
- Next → Season 2

The first season of the television comedy series Boy Meets World aired between September 24, 1993 and May 13, 1994, on ABC in the United States. The season was produced by Michael Jacobs Productions and Touchstone Television with series creator Michael Jacobs as executive producer. It was broadcast as part of the ABC comedy block TGIF on Friday evenings. The pilot debuted to ratings of 16.5 million viewers.

== Cast ==
=== Main ===
- Ben Savage as Cory Matthews
- William Daniels as George Feeny
- Betsy Randle as Amy Matthews
- Will Friedle as Eric Matthews
- Rider Strong as Shawn Hunter
- Lee Norris as Stuart Minkus
- Lily Nicksay as Morgan Matthews
- William Russ as Alan Matthews

=== Recurring ===
- Danielle Fishel as Topanga Lawrence

== Episodes ==
Boy Meets World Season 1 episodes
No. overall	No. in season	Title	Directed by	Written by	Original release date	Prod. code	Viewers (millions)
1	1	"Pilot"	John Tracy	Michael Jacobs & April Kelly	September 24, 1993	B601	16.5
Middle school begins for Cory Matthews (Ben Savage) and his best friend, Shawn Hunter (Rider Strong). They talk to their teacher, Mr. Feeny (William Daniels), and Cory attempts to eat candy for breakfast. They soon begin their class discussions and Mr. Feeny is teaching William Shakespeare's Romeo and Juliet, and how two students will portray those roles. Meanwhile, Cory is not paying attention and is listening to the Philadelphia Phillies game on a personal radio. Cory gets caught and argues with Mr. Feeny that it is an important thing. Cory and his older brother, Eric (Will Friedle), planned to go to the game but he dumped him in order to bring a girl out on a date. Later, Cory told his parents, Amy (Betsy Randle) and Alan (William Russ), but they do not show sympathy that he had detention on the day of the game. Cory feels that his parents don't care about him and he moves himself into his tree house. While there, he spots Mr. Feeny talking to someone in the phone and is eating alone for a dinner made for two. Cory goes back into the house and Amy tells him that when people grow up they get different interests. After this talk, Cory is ready to face detention. The next day, Cory tells Mr. Feeny that he saw him eating alone, and Mr. Feeny gives him a speech about "the power of love", and uses the Matthews family as an example. Cory later moves out of the tree house and back at home. Meanwhile, Eric returns from the game and tells everyone how miserable he was on the date. Cory convinces Eric to call the girl back because he said, "I'm told love is worth it". In the post-credits, Cory is having a tea-party with his little sister Morgan (Lily Nicksay) and tells her that he will never ditch her for a girl. Mr. Feeny asks a teacher out for dinner, and reveals that the night Cory saw him having dinner alone, was supposed to be with him and his sister who cancelled at the last minute. Guest stars: Cynthia Mace as Evelyn, Krystin Moore as Vanessa Absent: Lee Norris as Stuart Minkus
2	2	"On the Fence"	David Trainer	Jeff C. Sherman	October 1, 1993	B603	19.2
Cory and his friends are having a talk about who is the best superhero. This leads to an ultimate water-gun fight. Cory's best friend, Shawn Hunter, shot a nerdy kid named Stuart Minkus (Lee Norris) with the water-gun, and Cory feels left out because he is the only one who doesn't have one yet. Minkus gets annoyed with how Cory and Shawn are treating him so he gets out his brand-new water-gun and retaliates by shooting Cory and his friends. Cory tries to convince Amy and Alan to buy him a water-gun which is worth $50 but they refuse, so he turns to Eric and asks him to buy the water-gun for him. Eric also refuses and even shows off his new watch to Cory. After hearing that Eric got the money from his job at Alan's supermarket, Cory asks Alan if he could work there. Alan refuses and tells him that he is too young and that there are no job openings. Alan talks to Cory about enjoying his youth time but he gets angry that he can't have his water-gun. Cory goes to Mr. Feeny, who offers to pay him $50 to paint his shutters for him. Cory airbrushes the paint and is proud of what he has done, but he sees that the paint went through the shutter slats and onto the white fence. Cory's friends have a water-gun fight with him, and he asks them to help him repaint the fence. They do so, but give up. Cory returns to the house, soaking wet but is very happy. Meanwhile, Eric returns from work and is terribly exhausted and questions how Alan can work such long hours and still do work at home. From a distance, Cory sees Alan painting the fence and says that his dad is "Superman". During dinner, Cory starts a water-fight between his family and he sold his $50 water-gun for two smaller pistols, and he gave one to Alan so he can "revisit" being a kid. In the post-credits, Morgan calls the cops and says that the Matthews are outside "fighting", and they "just shot the neighbor"! Guest star: DeJuan Guy as Ellis
3	3	"Father Knows Less"	David Trainer	April Kelly	October 8, 1993	B604	18.5
Alan and Cory are making a sandwich to take to the Blue Angels navy flight demonstration. Unfortunately, the supermarket assistant manager, Lenny Spinelli, comes bringing bad news to Alan that there is chaos and broken shelves. Because he is the manager of the supermarket, Alan is forced to cancel his plans with Cory but promises to make it up to him. Later on, Alan wakes up Cory and invites him to watch the end of the Philadelphia Phillies game with him, even though it is late. In the class the next morning, Cory falls asleep and fails the test Mr. Feeny gave. Cory tries to explain to Mr. Feeny why he was sleepy, but he refuses to accept an excuse. Cory tells Alan and Amy, and Alan talks to Mr. Feeny. Mr. Feeny understands, but he refuses to change Cory's grade. Alan and Mr. Feeny get into an argument and Alan tells him that he doesn't understand because he doesn't have a son. Then, Lenny Spinelli returns to the Matthews household delivering more bad news. Cory accidentally throws a ball in Mr. Feeny's yard and is caught trying to get it. Mr. Feeny invites Cory and talks to him. He reveals that he wanted to spend time with his dad when he was younger to listen to President Truman's speech. But, Mr. Feeny's father refused, not because he had school the next day, but because he didn't want Mr. Feeny to be near his drinking buddies. Mr. Feeny tells Cory that it is important that a boy spends time with his father. Alan returns from dealing with the small fire at the supermarket, and sees Mr. Feeny and Cory talking. Alan sends Cory to bed and assures Mr. Feeny that Cory will go to bed on time. Cory asks Amy why adults change who is right, and she tells him that two adults can think differently about something. Even though he is confused, Cory is sure what Alan meant that he go to sleep on time. Alan them promises to Cory that he'll be there for him if he misses something. Guest stars: Willie Garson as Lenny Spinelli, Thomas Brown IV as TV Announcer
4	4	"Cory's Alternative Friends"	David Trainer	Patricia Forrester	October 15, 1993	B606	20.4
Shawn and Cory are partners for a presentation about air pollution in Mr. Feeny's class, but turn it into an off-topic discussion about the Philadelphia Phillies. Mr. Feeny blames himself for letting Cory and Shawn become partners. For their next assignment, Mr. Feeny assigns the partners. Shawn is partnered up with Minkus and is thrilled because he will do all of the work. Meanwhile, Cory is not so thrilled with his partner Topanga Lawrence, a hippie nerd who it part of the "out-cast" group and sits with the "weird-kids" at lunch. Cory tries to persuade Mr. Feeny, but he made his decision. At lunch, Cory hears some girls talking about a "total Brillo-head" and thought that they were talking about him. Later, Topanga goes to Cory's house to make him sign a petition to stop the librarian from retiring. When Topanga leaves, Cory informs Shawn about his "hair problem", and they call Shawn's sister and get something to straighten his hair. Cory and Topanga work on their project with Cory wanting a quick presentation, while Topanga wants to go to the performing arts route. Topanga them performs a poem and tells Cory that he shouldn't be embarrassed to show his true self. Topanga tells Cory that she doesn't care when people make fun of her, and that Cory blends in well. Cory tricks Topanga into leaving. Cory and Shawn check his hair and are shocked when his hair turns out different because they left the chemicals in too long. Cory decides not to go to school, but Alan and Amy refuse. At school, everyone makes fun of and laughs at Cory's hair and he sits at the "Weird-Kids lunch table". Cory helps Topanga and her friends to get their petition for the school librarian. Despite he is embarrassed of his hair, Cory doesn't want to let Topanga and his new friends down. After they finished their goal, Minkus and everyone else left, while Cory and Topanga shared their first kiss ever, with Cory handcuffed to a locker. Cory is so embarrassed and shocked. Cory's hair returns to normal, and he confronts the girls who were talking about him, and realize they were talking about another boy. Topanga and Cory share a look, with Topanga showing off her new red baseball cap. Guest stars: Danielle Fishel as Topanga, Marla Sokoloff as Paige, Megan Parlen as Barbara, Katie Jane Johnston as Hillary, Marty York as Larry, Sam Horrigan as Student #1, Chris Owen as Ned Note: Danielle Fishel as Topanga Lawrence (later Matthews), is a recurring character for the first season, but starting in season 2, Danielle Fishel joined the main cast as Topanga, and is credited in the opening credits.
5	5	"Killer Bees"	David Trainer	Susan Estelle Jansen	October 22, 1993	B602	17.1
In the geography test, Minkus scores the highest score once again. Cory did not do too well (he got a C), and he actually studies, but he blames the out-of-date textbooks. Mr. Feeny agrees with Cory but tells him that the Board of Education doesn't have enough money. Mr. Feeny also tells him that if he paid attention in class, he might have done a bit better. Mr. Feeny informs the class about the upcoming Regional Geography Tournament. Minkus always enters and wins. The whole class is not paying attention until Mr. Feeny announces that the winner will get to be the batboy at the upcoming World Series. Everyone, but Minkus, loves the prize. Cory tries to convince Mr. Feeny into letting him compete, but he knows Cory's motives. Later, Cory and his friends ambush and take Minkus to the Matthews house. Meanwhile, Eric is continuously arguing with Amy about a concert he is going to. Eric is bringing a date to the Aerosmith concert and is embarrassed to be near Alan and Amy. On the other hand, Cory tries to convince Minkus to withdraw from the Geography tournament. Minkus agrees to Cory's bargain under one condition - they will not throw balls at him during gym class. Because of Minkus' resignation, Mr. Feeny has no one else but Cory. Mr. Feeny doesn't want to enter thinking Cory will humiliate him. Cory hits the books and is confident for the tournament. Unfortunately, he and Mr. Feeny lost the tournament, and gets even more angry learning that the girl who won isn't even interested in the prize. Meanwhile, Eric and Heather come home early from the concert due to Eric being embarrassed. Heather, though, thinks that Amy and Alan are cool. Eric starts appreciating his parents for who they are after getting a talk. For Cory, even though he didn't win the geography tournament, he got an A on his geography test. In the post-credits, it show Cory watching the World Series and the announcers get into a geography discussion after the bat-girl runs onto the field with a protest-banner. Guest stars: DeJuan Guy as Ellis, Nikki Cox as Heather, Gisele MacKenzie as Loudspeaker Voice, Branelle Dahl as Contestant #5, Laurel Liskin as Contestant #6, Thomas Brown IV as Announcer Ed, Tom Kelly as Announcer John
6	6	"Boys II Mensa"	David Trainer	Janette Kotichas Burleigh	October 29, 1993	B607	21.3
It is near Halloween and Cory dresses up like a clown taking the phrase "Class Clown" too literally. Mr. Feeny returns graded book reports. Cory attempts to protest his grade comparing himself to Minkus; this causes Cory to get himself into detention. Shawn and Cory both are in detention and come across an I.Q. answer key. Cory cheats and memorizes the scores and gets a high grade on the test. Mr. Feeny gets suspicious because Cory scored even higher than Minkus (who always scores the highest). He sends home a note for Alan and Amy, but Shawn convinces Cory to keep up his act. His parents know the truth, but refuse to accuse Cory in hopes that he will admit the truth. Meanwhile, Eric bought Morgan a Halloween costume as a Zombie. Amy disagrees with the costume, Morgan, Alan, and Eric are enthusiastic about it. Cory tells Shawn that he is starting to become guilty for lying to his parents. At school, Mr. Feeny gives Cory a final chance to admit the truth before telling him he would be transferred to a school full of prodigies and no sports. Cory doesn't admit and Mr. Feeny tells him that he'll get what he deserves. After school, a woman from the gifted school gives Cory a test, and Shawn tells him to fail the test on purpose so he won't have to go to the school. Cory admits to his parents that he cheated on the I.Q. test. Alan and Amy ground Cory for two weeks but let him go trick-or-treating and advise him not to be something he is not. Cory gives up the title of class clown to Mr. Feeny, and realizes why he is harder on Cory than on students who score the same on tests. In the post-credits, Mr. Feeny went to the Matthews house to ask for some candy, and two boys who are trick-or-treating tell Mr. Feeny that he is the best teacher ever. Mr. Feeny is convinced that it is Cory but is mistaken. After he leaves, the two boys are revealed to be Cory and Shawn, and Cory says "And they think I'm not a genius!" Guest stars: Jane Carr as Mrs. Bertram, Marty York as Costumed Kid #1, Sam Horrigan as Costumed Kid #2, Dusty Gould as Costumed Kid #3
7	7	"Grandma Was a Rolling Stone"	David Trainer	Ed Decter & John J. Strauss	November 12, 1993	B609	22.0
Cory and Shawn find themselves removing snails from Mr. Feeny's garden for bait in their upcoming fishing trip with Alan. Alan tells Cory that Eric will not be joining them due to his interest in girls. Eric teaches Morgan to be his "wing-man" in front of girls. Meanwhile, Alan's mother, Bernice, arrives and brings gifts for Morgan and Eric; giving Morgan a shrunken head and Eric a bull-whip. She gives Amy and Alan a dried-up cactus. While there, Bernice promises to get Morgan new clothes at the mall, bring Eric to see bikini girls, and get Cory a Cal Ripken baseball card autographed by the "man in the picture." Later, Mr. Feeny seeks Eric to help entertain his niece, Jessica. Eric brings out Morgan to use her as his wing-man. Mr. Feeny gets annoyed knowing that Eric is using Morgan to get on a date with Jessica. Morgan invites Jessica to the carnival with her and Eric. Meanwhile, Cory realizes that Bernice won't show up and decides to spend the Sunday afternoon with Shawn. Much to his surprise, Shawn is out fishing with Alan. Cory is terribly disappointed that both Alan and Bernice abandoned him. Later on, Morgan, Jessica, and Eric return and share a kiss - but get caught by Shawn and Alan. Cory and Alan talk about how Bernice shows her weird way of love. Mr. Feeny comes over, confronts Eric, about taking out Jessica after dark, but Bernice returns and covers up for Eric. In the end-credits, Shawn admires Cory's card, while Cory understands the worth of it. Special guest star: Rue McClanahan as Bernice Matthews Guest star: Keri Russell as Jessica Absent: Lee Norris as Stuart Minkus
8	8	"Teacher's Bet"	David Trainer	April Kelly	November 19, 1993	B610	21.2
Cory and Minkus get into a conversation where Cory thinks Mr. Feeny gets overpaid, while Minkus thinks he gets underpaid. Meanwhile, after so many cracks, Mr. Feeny calls Cory after class and decides to make a bet with him. The challenge is Cory will teach the class, and if more kids pass than usual, he wins the bet and gets 1/5 of Mr. Feeny's paycheck; but if fewer kids pass, Mr. Feeny gets Cory's brand new bike. Eric brings home his new girlfriend named Linda, and Morgan gets a liking to her especially when she gave her a gift of a Japanese lantern. Later, Cory informs his parents about the bet but they are not so enthusiastic. During his first day, Cory names himself as the teacher and is called "Hey, Dude." He becomes too nice and the class gets out of control. Cory decides to give up. At home, Cory realizes that racial prejudice still exists after Linda gets called a racial slur at their local mall. Cory gives a speech to the class, and gets their attention once he calls Shawn a racial slur. Mr. Feeny tells Cory that the same number of people passed except Shawn - he got a B (he always gets a C). In the post-credits, Linda is showing off her cheerleader moves to Eric and Amy. Guest stars: Danielle Fishel as Topanga, Lindsay Price as Linda
9	9	"Class Pre-Union"	David Trainer	Ed Decter & John J. Strauss	November 26, 1993	B611	15.8
Cory is making a video about being the middle child and interviews every member in the Matthews family. Amy gave Morgan a gold necklace, and Alan tells Cory not to break the video camera, but he does. In class, Mr. Feeny assigns a project titled "Preunion", to see how much has changed when they see each other at their 20th high school reunion, with the personal details that led up to it. Shawn decides to become a salesman because that is what his father does. Meanwhile, Cory is helping Amy create the props for the Preunion. Morgan tells Amy that she traded her gold necklace for a fake one. Amy tries to talk to the girl's mother but she refuses to give it back. The next day, Minkus is dressed as an entrepreneur and is settled to take over Microsoft, and is married to Topanga. Then it becomes Cory's turn to turn in a presentation, but due to lack of research Mr. Feeny gives Cory an "incomplete" grade. Unfortunately, Cory takes this personally and feels his dream of becoming a professional baseball player is crushed. Cory disposes of all of his baseball souvenirs and posters and even brings Eric to become sad due to his sour attitude. Meanwhile, Amy invites Stephanie (the girl who Morgan gave the necklace) and her mother, and Morgan tricks Stephanie into giving her back their stuff, but including her mother's car keys. Eric and Cory cheer up when Alan invited professional baseball player Jim Abbott. Jim Abbott gives Cory advice not to give up on his dream, but also the power of an education. Mr. Feeny throws all of Cory's baseballs on the Matthews side of the fence. In the post-credits, Alan wonders if Amy regrets marrying him because he didn't pursue his dream to become an engineer. Special guest star: Jim Abbott as himself Guest stars: Danielle Fishel as Topanga, Christine Heavy as Jane, Marty York as Larry, Brittany English Stephen as Stephanie, Kristopher Kyer as TV Voice #1, Lisa E. Wilcox as TV Voice #2, Matt Kirkwood as TV Voice #3
10	10	"Santa's Little Helper"	David Trainer	Susan Estelle Jansen	December 10, 1993	B612	18.1
At lunch, Cory notices that Shawn brought a packed lunch to school, instead of their usual fish sticks day in the cafeteria. Minkus shows up at their table, telling Cory and Shawn that each person in the class should contribute $5 for Mr. Feeny's gift from the class. However, Shawn says that he has spent his money. Soon, Cory and Topanga get into a heated debate on the true spirit of the holidays. Cory and Shawn start bragging to each other about what they are getting for Christmas and after finding out that he got an NBA basketball, Cory decides to tell Shawn to see what he got. However, Alan tells him that Shawn won't be getting a lot for the holidays this year since his father has been laid off work. Feeling sad, Cory decides to give his basketball to Shawn as a present. However, Shawn finds out that Cory is aware of his family's financial situation, gets upset, and refuses to be his charity case. After eavesdropping on their conversation, Mr. Feeny provides Cory with neighborly advice that the friendship shouldn't be amounted on the gifts that you give nor should you give it to make yourself feel good, but out of the generosity and purity of your heart. The next day, Minkus tells Shawn that Cory had paid his part of the gift for Feeny. Minkus presents Feeny his gift, and Cory and Shawn apologize to each other, both learning the true meaning of Christmas, as well as friendship. Meanwhile, Morgan feels like she killed Santa Claus after an incident in the mall injured Santa. Amy, Alan, and Eric attempt to console her, but she locks herself in the restroom. In the post-credits, Mr. Feeny, who is disguised as Santa Claus, comes into the household to help calm Morgan. However, she figures out that it is Feeny and while in shock, the camera clicks and the Matthews take their annual family picture. Guest stars: Danielle Fishel as Topanga, Tom LaGrua as Elf Note: This episode is titled "Santa's Little Helper" and should not be mistaken for "Santa's Little Helpers" from the sixth season.
11	11	"The Father/Son Game"	David Trainer	Bill Lawrence	December 17, 1993	B608	19.0
It is a Friday morning in the Matthews household, and Cory is annoyed that Morgan ate all of the sugar cereal. Eric tries to convince Amy and Alan to have a later curfew so that he could spend more time with his date. Alan excitedly informs Eric and Cory about the annual father/son softball game. Cory and Eric, though, do not share the same enthusiasm as Alan for the softball game. At school, Cory's class recited the Pledge of Allegiance, except Topanga. Cory laughs about Topanga getting in trouble and finds out that Mr. Feeny asked Topanga not to say the Pledge of Allegiance to start the lesson of the day. He used Cory and Topanga as examples for the social debate: Pledge Vs. Protest. Topanga is defending the right to protest and Cory thinks it is not worth it to protest. Meanwhile, Cory sees Alan practicing for the father/son game and feels guilty about telling him that he doesn't want to play. Eric and Cory try to make Amy help them not be in the softball game. Eric and Cory try to give Alan excuses and he tells them that the game has been cancelled. Cory finds out that the game was played from Topanga. Eric and Cory try to make it up to Alan by throwing him a barbecue. In the class, Cory tells the class that no matter what tradition anyone is doing they should respect it. Cory and Eric tell Alan to have a re-match father/son softball game by challenging the bookstore to another match. In the post-credits, they come back victorious. Guest stars: Danielle Fishel as Topanga, Willie Garson as Lenny Spinelli
12	12	"Once in Love with Amy"	David Trainer	Ken Kuta	January 7, 1994	B613	24.1
On the night of Amy's bowling league, the babysitter cancels on her. Eric, feeling responsible, decides to be mature and volunteers to babysit Cory and Morgan. In class, Mr. Feeny poses a math question, in which Cory and Minkus get wrong. However, Topanga finds the solution. Feeny explains that the answer to the question is not in fact a mathematical solution, and that it is the student's responsibility to figure out what the answer is. Feeling stumped, Shawn and Cory decide to test out Mr. Feeny's question on a Barbie doll and a toy car. Consequently, Minkus arrives at Cory's door on the edge of a nervous breakdown after his failed attempt at solving the problem. Later on, Cory finds out from Shawn that Amy's bowling league had ended nearly six weeks ago, causing Cory to worry. Cory, Shawn, and Eric open Amy's bag finding a cocktail dress. The brothers leave to follow Amy, leaving Shawn in charge of Morgan. Upon their arrival to the restaurant, Cory and Eric see their mother dancing with a mysterious figure. When they arrive home, Eric decides to tell Alan about what he saw. Then, however, Amy explains to the boys that she was the one dancing with Alan. She also explained that since they were busy parents with three children, they hadn't had time for each other, so she and Alan decided to add some mystery into their date. Back in the classroom, Feeny tells the class of Topanga's answer, revealing "the secret of life"— people change people, from which he learned from his mother. In the post-credits, Minkus is shown to be still stuck on trying to figure out the mathematical answer to Mr. Feeny's problem, and inadvertently discovers time-travel. However, he chooses to disregard it. Guest star: Danielle Fishel as Topanga
13	13	"She Loves Me, She Loves Me Not"	David Trainer	April Kelly	January 14, 1994	B614	23.9
Topanga develops a crush on Eric, but Cory gets the impression that her affections are directed at him. Guest stars: Danielle Fishel as Topanga, Krystee Clark as Nebula, Breanne O'Donnell as The Girl
14	14	"The B-Team of Life"	David Trainer	Jeff Menell	January 28, 1994	B605	21.0
Cory and Minkus are assigned to the basketball "B-Team" at school, and rarely get to play. However, Cory also gets the feeling that he is on the "B-Team" with his own family. Guest stars: Ahmad Stoner as Harris, Hugh Dane as Coach, Phil Proctor as TV Voice #1, Robert Clotworthy as TV Voice #2
15	15	"Model Family"	David Trainer	Ed Decter & John J. Strauss	February 4, 1994	B615	21.4
After watching an episode of Leave it to Beaver, Mr Feeny assigns the class a project to become an "ideal family". Cory, Shawn, Topanga, and Minkus are all in a group of four. Shawn and Minkus are paired as brothers, while Cory and Topanga are their parents. They learn that there is no such thing as "an ideal family". Meanwhile, Eric attempts a career in modelling. Special guest star: Kathy Ireland as Alexis Guest stars: Danielle Fishel as Topanga, Jason Marsden as Jason, Kelly Packard as Tracy, Stephanie Dicker as Erin, Matt Kirkwood as Photographer, Kristopher Kyer as Mall Announcer
16	16	"Risky Business"	David Trainer	Ken Kuta	February 11, 1994	B617	22.7
Cory and Shawn bet on racehorses for a school project, but they soon learn—the hard way—that there are things in life that are not worth risking. Guest stars: Danielle Fishel as Topanga, Thomas Brown IV as Sports Announcer, Trevor Denman as Track Announcer
17	17	"The Fugitive"	David Trainer	Jeff C. Sherman	February 25, 1994	B618	14.9
When Shawn blows up a mailbox at Alan's grocery store with a cherry bomb, he stays in Cory's room to avoid going home. Cory tries to keep this secret as long as he can but soon learns what it means to be a true friend and helps Shawn to face what he did. Guest star: Danielle Fishel as Topanga
18	18	"It's a Wonderful Night"	David Trainer	Susan Estelle Jansen	March 11, 1994	B616	19.3
At school, Shawn informs Cory that he rented an 'R'-rated movie and tells him that they will watch the horror film in the Matthews household. Amy and Alan do not allow any type of material like that inside their home and ban it. Shawn and Cory attempt to smuggle it since his parents will be out for the evening. Meanwhile, Judy, the Matthews regular babysitter, cancelled due to a skin condition. Eric takes his driver's test but fails. Eric and his friend have dates and he decides to drive anyway so that he won't disappoint his date. Desperate to find a babysitter, Eric convinces Mr. Feeny to step-in as the babysitter so that his plans will not be cancelled. Mr. Feeny becomes the babysitter and plays tea party with Morgan and wears a floppy hat much to his detriment. Cory and Shawn initially fool Mr. Feeny telling him that they're watching a nature film. Later, the car Eric was driving gets towed and he is unable to retrieve it because he does not have a license. Troubles arises as Mr. Feeny discovers that Cory and Shawn smuggled an inappropriate movie. Mr. Feeny finds out that Eric got his car towed. And if that wasn't enough, Amy and Alan return home and find out about the happenings. In consequence of the happenings, Amy and Alan ground Cory for two weeks only letting him watch educational television, and make Eric retake his driver's test so that he can drive Morgan and Cory wherever they want. Guest stars: Jason Marsden as Jason, Don Gibb as Tony, Kelly Packard as Tracy, Stephanie Dicker as Erin, Kristopher Kyer as TV Voice #1, Kevin Thompson as TV Voice #2, Lisa E. Wilcox as TV Voice #3 Absent: Lee Norris as Stuart Minkus
19	19	"Kid Gloves"	David Trainer	Jeff Menell	March 25, 1994	B620	20.1
Cory, Shawn, Minkus, and Topanga are required to choose an extra curricular activity and they all wind up in SCUBA diving. The next day, Cory is celebrating his 12th birthday and Alan bestows to him a gift. Cory realizes that the gift is just a worthless necklace of silver mittens, but he pretends to love it in order not to hurt Alan's feelings. Alan becomes disappointed knowing that Cory doesn't like his gift. Meanwhile, Morgan is persistently whining that she didn't get a gift like before during Cory and Eric's birthday. During the SCUBA class, Cory and Shawn are making jokes about each other's swimsuits until they are left speechless seeing Topanga in her bathing suit. They are excited to meet the SCUBA instructor but are shocked that it is Mr. Feeny. Later, Cory realizes that he lost Alan's necklace and goes SCUBA diving alone in an attempt to find it. Alan explains to Cory that he got it while he was in the U.S. Navy. During dinner, Eric poorly covers up for Cory when he tells their parents that he went to Shawn's house for dinner because Shawn is at the Matthews house. Alan and Amy realize that Cory is missing. While searching for Alan's necklace, Cory is caught by Mr. Feeny and is immediately brought home. Mr. Feeny tells Cory he found the necklace. Cory gives it to Alan telling him that he is not worthy of that kind of a gift. In the end credits, Alan secretly gives Morgan a toy horse but tells her not to tell Amy. He tells her that he won it in the Navy. Guest star: Danielle Fishel as Topanga
20	20	"The Play's the Thing"	David Trainer	Ed Decter & John J. Strauss	April 29, 1994	B621	16.2
Cory's class is making a play about William Shakespeare's Hamlet, and Cory gets the lead role with Topanga and Minkus as his "co-stars". At home, Cory tries to practice for his annual miniature golf match with Alan, Amy, and Eric. Eric tells Cory that he will throw the match for the price of $5. While Cory's class is rehearsing for the play, Cory tries to convince Mr. Feeny to make changes to make it more exciting. Later, Topanga gives Cory his costume as Hamlet which includes a doublet and tights. Cory calls it a "miniskirt and pantyhose" and refuses to wear it. Cory decides to quit the play and tells Shawn about his hidden motive and thinks that if he quits, Mr. Feeny will be forced to accept his suggestions. However, Minkus replaces Cory as Hamlet. At home, Cory finds out that Alan's job cut his salary by 5% which means they cannot afford to go the Jersey Shore for their annual miniature golf tournament. At school, Shawn is given Minkus' former role and begs Cory to return because Minkus is a poor substitute. Cory tries to convince Mr. Feeny to let him have his part back, but he refuses and teaches Cory a lesson about not letting people down who are counting on him. In the Matthews household, Cory finds out that they made their own mini-golf course in the backyard. In the play, Cory is a spear carrier and his co-spear carrier starts a fight on the stage which ends up involving everyone but Cory. Guest stars: Danielle Fishel as Topanga, Ryan Tomlinson as Spear Carrier
21	21	"Boy Meets Girl"	David Trainer	Janette Kotichas Burleigh	May 6, 1994	B622	16.2
Cory and Shawn's class watch a video about puberty, which disgusts them. Shortly after, Shawn's eyes are caught by a beautiful classmate named Hilary. Shawn asks out Hilary despite his agreement with Cory that they'll stay twelve until they are forty-two. In an attempt to keep up with his buddy, Cory asks Topanga out on a date, not knowing what dating really means. Cory asks Minkus for advice on dating and he gives Cory the answer to date the "girl in the dress", meaning Topanga. Meanwhile, Amy and Alan are excited knowing that Cory is out on his first date with Topanga. Cory becomes nervous and decides to fake being sick so that his date with Topanga will not pursue. The next day, Topanga went to the Matthews house to bring Cory some bancha tea. To Cory's surprise, Topanga is understanding about why he faked being ill. Cory and Topanga play a game with their laundry, and they chat about their Mother's Day gifts. In school, Cory explains to Topanga that them hanging out was not a date. Cory asks Topanga how she knows a lot about women, to her reply she says that she will become a "woman" one day. Before heading into class, she fixes Cory's collar but he annoyingly fixes it back. In the post-credits, Cory and Shawn discuss about their first dates and always promise to stick together despite the coming of second dates, proms, engagements, and marriage. Later, Hilary says hi to Shawn and the same goes for Topanga to Cory. Guest stars: Danielle Fishel as Topanga, Breanne O'Donnell as Hilary, Gisele MacKenzie as Narrator Voice, Gil Stratton, Jr. as TV Announcer
22	22	"I Dream of Feeny"	David Trainer	Mark Fink	May 13, 1994	B619	16.3
Cory and Shawn are worrying over a geography test that they have not studied for. Cory wishes that Mr. Feeny will get a "sick day" so that the test will be cancelled. The day of the test arrives, and Cory's wish came true; Mr. Feeny was sent to the hospital. This causes Cory to believe that he has the power to make people sick, and thinks of it as a "gift". Meanwhile, Topanga tries to convince Shawn that the "power of mind" should not be taken so lightly. Minkus becomes extremely worried about Mr. Feeny that he even doesn't have the power to trade insults with Shawn. Shawn is now worried about Cory's powers, and Topanga informs him that he will receive karma for his actions. Cory's conscience is now haunting his dreams, as he sees Mr. Feeny's "ghost" haunting him and continuously telling Cory that he "killed" him. The next day, Cory goes to the hospital to visit Mr. Feeny to make sure he's okay. Cory gives Mr. Feeny a geranium, planning it to be a metaphor for growth. In the end-credits, Topanga is performing an experiment with Minkus, Cory, and Shawn in trying to power a light bulb with their minds. Guest stars: Danielle Fishel as Topanga, Janet Carroll as Nurse Jill, Juliette Jeffers as Karen Chase Note: This is the last episode to credit Lee Norris as a regular cast member and his last appearance on the show until the Season 5 finale, "Graduation". Absent: Lily Nicksay as Morgan Matthews
