= Boy Meets World season 4 =

Boy Meets World
- Season 4
- Season 4 DVD cover
- Starring: Ben Savage; William Daniels; Betsy Randle; Will Friedle; Rider Strong; Danielle Fishel; Anthony Tyler Quinn; Lindsay Ridgeway; William Russ
- No. of episodes: 22

Release
- Original network: ABC
- Original release: September 20, 1996 – May 2, 1997

Season chronology
- ← Previous; Season 3 Next → Season 5

The fourth season of the television comedy series Boy Meets World aired between September 20, 1996 and May 2, 1997, on ABC in the United States. The season was produced by Michael Jacobs Productions and Touchstone Television with series creator Michael Jacobs as executive producer. It was broadcast as part of the ABC comedy block TGIF on Friday evenings.

== Cast ==
- Ben Savage as Cory Matthews
- William Daniels as George Feeny (Note: Although regular cast members are usually uncredited for the episodes that they haven't appeared in, series regulars William Daniels, Betsy Randle, Will Friedle, and William Russ are credited in the episodes that they were absent in.)
- Betsy Randle as Amy Matthews
- Will Friedle as Eric Matthews
- Rider Strong as Shawn Hunter
- Danielle Fishel as Topanga Lawrence
- Anthony Tyler Quinn as Jonathan Turner
- Lindsay Ridgeway as Morgan Matthews (Note: Only credited for the episodes she appeared in.)
- William Russ as Alan Matthews

== Episodes ==
Boy Meets World Season 4 Episodes
No. overall	No. in season	Title	Directed by	Written by	Original release date	Prod. code	Viewers (millions)
68	1	"You Can Go Home Again"	Jeff McCracken	Mark Blutman & Howard Busgang	September 20, 1996	B720	13.1
Nearing the end of last season's summer road trip, Cory agrees to a final pit stop— without realizing that Eric intends to make it a permanent one because he feels that there's nothing there for him back home. Meanwhile, winning a company award makes Alan consider whether or not he's really happy with his current employment as a supermarket manager. Guest stars: Dick Van Patten as Amish Farmer, Phil Leeds as Phil, Marisa Ryan as Irene, Matt Landers as Graham, Charles Noland as Garrett Note: Lindsay Ridgeway joins the main cast, Alex Désert leaves the main cast. Absent: Anthony Tyler Quinn as Jonathan Turner
69	2	"Hair Today, Goon Tomorrow"	Jeff McCracken	Susan Estelle Jansen	September 27, 1996	B721	13.2
After Cory expresses his insecurity about his hair, Topanga cuts off six inches of her own hair, in an attempt to show him how meaningless outward appearance is compared with inner beauty. However, she soon realizes that even she can be self-conscious when she becomes horrified after seeing her new 'do', and decides to get a makeover. Meanwhile, Eric refuses to look for a job, and instead lazily stays home watching daytime TV, where he gets a glimpse of the real world. Guest stars: Dom Irrera as Bosco, Dana Daurey as Tammy, Will Estes as Dylan
70	3	"I Ain't Gonna Spray Lettuce No More"	Jeff McCracken	Mark Blutman & Howard Busgang	October 4, 1996	B722	12.3
Alan goes to demand a raise, but he instead quits his job as a supermarket manager— something that shocks all of the Matthews, including himself. Amy becomes furious that he has made a decision that affects their entire family without talking to her about it first. Meanwhile, a hysterical Cory enlists Shawn's help in an attempt to learn how to cope with poverty. Guest stars: Dick O'Neill as Mr. Kimball, George Wyner as Frank Absent: Anthony Tyler Quinn as Jonathan Turner
71	4	"Fishing for Virna"	Jeff McCracken	Matthew Nelson	October 11, 1996	B723	12.3
After having run away from her family over a year ago, Shawn's mother Virna is back. However, she would not actually return to her family until Shawn and Chet can prove that they're really willing to live like a family. Also, after learning from the Hunters that you do not truly appreciate someone until she's gone, Cory thinks of ways to inspire students to honor the late Brenda, a beloved and devoted cafeteria lady. Guest stars: Blake Clark as Chet Hunter, Shareen Mitchell as Virna Hunter, Ethan Suplee as Frankie, E.J. De La Pena as Herman, Loretta Jean as Brenda, Mike Grief as Mort
72	5	"Shallow Boy"	Jeff McCracken	Jeff C. Sherman	October 18, 1996	B724	16.3
When Eric offends Corinna, a perky but weird girl who writes overly cheerful lyrics, she composes a nasty song about him, and as a result Eric gains instant notoriety— or rather, infamy. Meanwhile, after babysitting together, Topanga feuds with Cory because she fears that their differing viewpoints on child rearing could affect their long-term future. This episode features dialogue paralleling the concurrent rescheduling of Boy Meets World to a later time slot in an example of breaking the fourth wall. Guest stars: Leisha Hailey as Corinna, Devon O'Brien as Mrs. Epperson, Zack Phifer as Mr. Epperson, Jonathan Osser as Billy, Jack Graiman as Bum Absent: Anthony Tyler Quinn as Jonathan Turner
73	6	"Janitor Dad"	Jeff McCracken	Jeff Menell	October 25, 1996	B725	15.2
When Virna gives Chet an ultimatum to find work, he lands a job as the school custodian, to Shawn's humiliation. Meanwhile, Alan and Eric look for experienced help at the store, and answering their call is a mountain man who will do anything to make a sale. Guest stars: Blake Clark as Chet Hunter, Shareen Mitchell as Virna Hunter, Jen Campbell as Lonnie, Mickey Jones as Ezekial, Kevin West as Wally, Andrew Bilgore as Edgar, Willie Garson as Mervyn, Sean Babb as Doug, Marcus Toji as Kid #1 Absent: Lindsay Ridgeway as Morgan Matthews
74	7	"Singled Out"	Jeff McCracken	Steve Hibbert	November 1, 1996	B727	14.8
Eric has been having bad luck dating, so he says that he is attending Harvard so that he can appear on MTV's Singled Out. Meanwhile, Cory must undergo an operation, but when he listens to a rumor that Shawn tells him about, he begins to worry that he'll vanish from the operating room. Guest stars: Chris Hardwick as himself, John O'Hurley as Grant, Bridget Flanery as Lisa, Karen Lynn Scott as Donna, Leah Fisher as Contestant #1, Jennifer Leigh Edwards as Contestant #2, Gail Boggs as Nurse, Jon Ernst as Piano boy Absent: Anthony Tyler Quinn as Jonathan Turner, Lindsay Ridgeway as Morgan Matthews
75	8	"Dangerous Secret"	Jeff McCracken	Jeff C. Sherman	November 8, 1996	B726	16.0
When Cory discovers that attractive Claire has been sleeping over at Shawn's place, he jumps to the obvious conclusion, especially when Shawn swears him to secrecy. But Cory learns that they have a much more serious, much more dangerous problem — her father is abusing her. Guest star: Ariana Richards as Claire Ferguson Absent: Anthony Tyler Quinn as Jonathan Turner, Lindsay Ridgeway as Morgan Matthews
76	9	"Sixteen Candles and Four-Hundred-Pound Men"	Jeff McCracken	Matthew Nelson	November 15, 1996	B728	15.3
Frankie seeks Cory and Shawn's help to earn the love of his father, Vader when Vader wrestles Jake "The Snake" Roberts at a World Wrestling Federation house show. However, the match takes place the same day as Topanga's Sweet Sixteen— forcing the kid who "wants everyone to love him" to both help a friend and celebrate a girlfriend's birthday at the same time. Guest stars: Leon Allen White as Vader, Ethan Suplee as Frankie, E.J. De La Pena as Herman, Jake "The Snake" Roberts as himself, Brother Love as Announcer, Earl Hebner as Ref Note: There is a reference to an episode of The Flintstones here. Cory and Shawn talk about Fred Flintstone having to be in two places at once. The episode refers to "Pebbles' Birthday vs. the Water Buffalo Party". This episode makes a title reference to Sixteen Candles Absent: William Daniels as George Feeny, Betsy Randle as Amy Matthews, Will Friedle as Eric Matthews, Lindsay Ridgeway as Morgan Matthews, William Russ as Alan Matthews
77	10	"Turkey Day"	Jeff McCracken	Susan Estelle Jansen	November 22, 1996	B729	15.6
Cory and Shawn are given an assignment over the Thanksgiving weekend about the class differences that are the heart of the conflict in Rwanda, and are quick to assume that these same divisions, between the haves and the have-nots, do not exist in Philadelphia. But they learn better when their respective families do not show full enthusiasm in spending their Thanksgiving together. Meanwhile, Frankie's younger brother Herman hears that the aristocratic Matthews are coming to the trailer park, and he decides to try to sweetheart Cory's sister, Morgan. Guest stars: Blake Clark as Chet Hunter, Shareen Mitchell as Virna Hunter, Ned Bellamy as Luther, Ethan Suplee as Frankie, E.J. De La Pena as Herman, Kay E. Kuter as Herbert, Christian Meoli as Carl Absent: Anthony Tyler Quinn as Jonathan Turner
78	11	"An Affair to Forget"	Jeff McCracken	Story by : Eileen O'Hare; Teleplay by : Jeff C. Sherman	November 29, 1996	B730	12.4
Shawn is in shock when his girlfriend, Jennifer, dumps him. To try to help him, Cory starts badmouthing Jennifer to Shawn. But when Jennifer finds out about this, she agrees to make up with Shawn— as long as he and Cory end their friendship. Guest star: Kristanna Loken as Jennifer Note: This episode makes a title reference, An Affair to Remember. Absent: Anthony Tyler Quinn as Jonathan Turner, Lindsay Ridgeway as Morgan Matthews
79	12	"Easy Street"	Jeff McCracken	Jeff Menell	December 13, 1996	B732	14.3
Comedy veterans Buddy Hackett and Soupy Sales play two businessmen of a shady sort who hire Cory to run "errands" for them. Since it is just before Christmas, Cory decides he can use the money for his holiday shopping. However, Cory quits once he figures out that the two gents are part of the mob. Shawn takes over, but Cory must persuade his pal to quit as well, before he gets in over his head – or hit over the head. Special guest star: Buddy Hackett as Mr. Fountain Guest stars: Soupy Sales as Mr. Martini, Jen Campbell as Lonnie
80	13	"B & B's B 'N' B"	Jeff McCracken	Mark Blutman & Howard Busgang	January 3, 1997	B733	14.85
Shawn, in a crazy scheme to get his economics project done and make some real money at the same time, convinces Cory to turn Feeny's quaint home into a bed and breakfast while their unsuspecting teacher is out of town. Meanwhile, Eric and Feeny surprise each other when they bump into each other in Boston and start to develop a friendship. Guest stars: Len Lesser as Arnie, Dena Dietrich as Gloria, Michelle Clunie as Kelly, Gladys Holland as Mrs. Timmer Absent: Anthony Tyler Quinn as Jonathan Turner, Lindsay Ridgeway as Morgan Matthews
81	14	"Wheels"	Jeff McCracken	Jeff C. Sherman	January 17, 1997	B734	15.86
Alan finds himself at a crossroads when Cory, armed with a new driver's license on his 16th birthday, would rather celebrate the event on a road trip with Shawn and Topanga instead of with his father. Meanwhile, on their road trip Cory gets stopped by the police and goes on trial, while his dad watches videos of Cory when Cory was a little kid. Guest stars: Dan Lauria as Judge Lamb, Raymond O'Connor as Officer Dibble, Rikki Dale as Marnie Absent: Anthony Tyler Quinn as Jonathan Turner
82	15	"Chick Like Me"	Jeff McCracken	Steve Hibbert	January 31, 1997	B731	13.70
The war between the sexes starts heating up at John Adams High when the boys realize that girls expect different things when out on a date. When it is suggested to Cory that his school newspaper column is a tad boring, Shawn gives him a story idea on dating and sexual harassment based on the book they're reading in Mr. Feeny's class: "Black Like Me". After Cory emerges from the bathroom in full regalia, it is decided that Shawn would make a better girl: he's studied them much more carefully. Making his debut at school, Shawn, now Veronica Wasboyski, immediately gets asked out by Gary, one of the school's more well-known Lotharios. Shawn soon finds out what it's like to push off a teen boy's advances. Meanwhile, Eric tries to teach mountain-reared Lonnie how to get along with city men. Guest stars: Ryan Bittle as Gary, Katie Wright as Debbie, Jen Campbell as Lonnie, Mark Arnold as David Absent: Anthony Tyler Quinn as Jonathan Turner, Lindsay Ridgeway as Morgan Matthews
83	16	"A Long Walk to Pittsburgh"	Jeff McCracken	Matthew Nelson	February 7, 1997	B736	14.41
84	17	"A Long Walk to Pittsburgh"	Jeff McCracken	Mark Blutman & Howard Busgang	February 14, 1997	B737	14.10
Part 1: Eric accidentally discovers that Shawn and Topanga have a secret when he finds them behaving more than friendly at Chubbie's, and he tells Cory about it. Unfortunately, they only know half the truth— and tensions rise between friends and family as Cory tries to find out the real reason why Topanga is acting so strangely and soon finds out the truth – she's moving to Pittsburgh. Absent: Anthony Tyler Quinn as Jonathan Turner Part 2: Cory is taking Topanga's departure very hard, and is wavering between depression and anger. Fortunately for him, a surprise visitor comes to help him: Topanga is back! But, the couple will need to convince their friends and family that theirs is a true love if they want a shot of her staying in Philadelphia. Special guest star: Olivia Hussey as Aunt Prudence Guest stars: Katie Johnston as Rosie, Emma Ridley as Becky Absent: Anthony Tyler Quinn as Jonathan Turner, Lindsay Ridgeway as Morgan Matthews
85	18	"Uncle Daddy"	Jeff McCracken	Steve Young	February 28, 1997	B738	15.02
When Eric learns that his new girlfriend Kelly has a son, he's confident he's mature enough to handle the responsibility – but too scared to tell his parents about it. Meanwhile, Cory and his friends prepare for the dreaded SATs. Guest stars: Brittney Powell as Kelly, Justin Cooper as Ryan Absent: William Daniels as George Feeny, Anthony Tyler Quinn as Jonathan Turner
86	19	"Quiz Show"	Jeff McCracken	Steve Hibbert	March 21, 1997	B735	12.68
The producers of a dull but prestigious academic bowl sense a hit after Cory, Shawn and Topanga become star contestants by enlivening the show with their humor and pop culture knowledge. But Mr. Feeny concludes that today's modern world puts entertainment before education when the show's newfound popularity causes it to change its questions from brainy to brainless. Guest stars: Steven Gilborn as Arthur, Nancy Lenehan as Susan, Phil Leeds as Milton, Mark DeCarlo as Brett, Gina Mari as Kiki, Marcus Toji as Einstein Kid Absent: Anthony Tyler Quinn as Jonathan Turner, Lindsay Ridgeway as Morgan Matthews
87	20	"Security Guy"	Jeff McCracken	Story by : Mark Blutman & Howard Busgang; Teleplay by : Matthew Nelson	April 4, 1997	B740	12.58
Eric's schemes are bankrupting the store, but Alan is reluctant to fire him, so Amy does. Consequently, Eric decides to leave home and take a job as a security guard. However, Mr. Feeny knows that Eric's only looking for an easy way out, and tries to convince him to give the SAT and college another try. Meanwhile, Cory and Topanga try to get Shawn to join Mr. Feeny's SAT preparation class. Guest stars: Troy Evans as Trainer, Kris Iyer as Ronny Absent: Anthony Tyler Quinn as Jonathan Turner
88	21	"Cult Fiction"	Jeff McCracken	Jeff Menell	April 25, 1997	B739	9.92
When a lonely Shawn starts hanging around with a new group of people whom he defensively describes as "not a cult", Jonathan Turner tries to stop him before it's too late— but Shawn does not want his help because he does not believe Mr. Turner really cares about him. However, when Mr. Turner gets into a motorcycle accident, it forces Shawn to reevaluate his choices. He leaves the cult with new faith in God, himself, the future, and those who care for him. Final Appearance of Anthony Tyler Quinn as Jonathan Turner Guest stars: Jerry Levine as Mr. Mack, Tamara Mello as Sherri, Andie Tecec as Alicia Absent: Lindsay Ridgeway as Morgan Matthews
89	22	"Learning to Fly"	Jeff McCracken	Jeff C. Sherman	May 2, 1997	B741	12.08
Eric invites Cory and his friends to come with him to a potential college. However, once Cory finds out Topanga isn't coming, he gets upset, but a sexy college girl named Mary Beth offers to give him the "fun" he was hoping to have with Topanga. Meanwhile, Eric's doubt that any real college will accept him leads him to consider staying at a surfer school. Will they be able to "walk away from a sure thing"? Or will they throw away everything they've worked hard to keep? Guest stars: Bonnie Bartlett as Dean of Admissions, Bridgitta Dau as Julie, Lisa Dean Ryan as Mary Beth, Sandra Lafferty as Mrs. Blutemann
