= Boy Meets World season 2 =

Boy Meets World
- Season 2
- Season 2 DVD cover
- Starring: Ben Savage; William Daniels; Betsy Randle; Will Friedle; Rider Strong; Danielle Fishel; Lily Nicksay; Anthony Tyler Quinn; William Russ
- No. of episodes: 23

Release
- Original network: ABC
- Original release: September 23, 1994 – May 19, 1995

Season chronology
- ← Previous; Season 1 Next → Season 3

The second season of the television comedy series Boy Meets World aired between September 23, 1994 and May 19, 1995, on ABC in the United States. The season was produced by Michael Jacobs Productions and Touchstone Television with series creator Michael Jacobs as executive producer. It was broadcast as part of the ABC comedy block TGIF on Friday evenings. This is the last season to have Lily Nicksay portray Morgan Matthews. (She would be replaced by Lindsay Ridgeway in season three.)

== Cast ==
=== Main ===
- Ben Savage as Cory Matthews
- William Daniels as George Feeny
- Betsy Randle as Amy Matthews
- Will Friedle as Eric Matthews
- Rider Strong as Shawn Hunter
- Danielle Fishel as Topanga Lawrence
- Lily Nicksay as Morgan Matthews
- Anthony Tyler Quinn as Jonathan Turner
- William Russ as Alan Matthews

== Episodes ==
Boy Meets World Season 2 Episodes
No. overall	No. in season	Title	Directed by	Written by	Original release date	Prod. code	Viewers (millions)
23	1	"Back 2 School"	David Trainer	David Kendall	September 23, 1994	B623	19.2
High school marks a new journey for Cory Matthews and Shawn Hunter. Feeling nervous, the duo seek advice from Eric, who badgered them with a notebook full of information, however, it is under the condition that Cory avoids Eric at all costs. Shawn and Cory see new happiness now that they no longer have to deal with Mr. Feeny as their teacher, but feel scared about a notorious bully named Harley Keiner. Not put down by this, Cory and Shawn walk the halls of John Adams High and bump into a teacher, who they mistake as for Harley. It is then clarified that the teacher they met is a new teacher— Jonathan Turner, who immediately earns a reputation for being a cool teacher, and described by Cory and Shawn as "Feeny with an earring." After class, Cory crosses paths with the real Harley Keiner and after making small talk, immediately gets threatened. Harley lets Cory off the hook, but catches the attention of another teacher, who sends Harley and Cory ("Johnny Baboon") to the principal's office. Feeling like his high school experience couldn't get worse, Cory is shocked to find out that Mr. Feeny has been promoted to high school principal. Feeny lets Cory off the hook and gives Harley detention. Next, Harley blames Cory for his punishment and orders him to face him after school so that he can get beat up. Initially, Cory fakes an injury at nurse's, but decides to have dignity and face Harley. In the midst of their confrontation, Eric interjects causing Harley to attack them both. However, Mr. Turner steps in, tells Harley to release them. Guest star: Danny McNulty as Harley Keiner Note: Lee Norris exits the main cast, while Anthony Tyler Quinn joins. Danielle Fishel gets promoted to a main cast member.
24	2	"Pairing Off"	David Trainer	Glen Merzer	September 30, 1994	B625	19.3
Cory seems puzzled after everyone at school seems to be "pairing off" with each other, and starting to date. He goes to Shawn for advice and gets told that he needs to make himself more vulnerable and attractive. After this, Shawn pairs off with a fellow student, so Cory becomes determined to find a partner. He turns to Topanga, but gets pushed out of the way, after another student notices Topanga's attractiveness and beautiful hair. And after several attempts to get noticed, Cory decides to get advice from Eric. Meanwhile, Eric has an attractive study partner named Rebecca, and decides to make a move on her while Amy and Alan are at Morgan's soccer practice. They make out, eventually going to Amy and Alan's bedroom. While getting intimate, Cory interrupts them, scaring Rebecca off. Then, Cory seeks advice from Eric on "how to get a girl to say hi," and after using his methods gets a date with a girl, but fails to catch her name. Elsewhere, Amy and Alan discover Eric and Rebecca's rendezvous in their bedroom after finding an earring, and punish Eric while also giving Cory the proper advice. Cory sees the girl who he paired off with— Wendy. He asks her out on a date, saying that they should get to know each other. Guest stars: Nancy Valen as Ms. Kelly, Jessica Wesson as Wendy, Marguerite Moreau as Rebecca, Hillary Tuck as Samantha
25	3	"Notorious"	David Trainer	Jeff C. Sherman	October 7, 1994	B626	16.2
Wanting to make a name for himself at school, Shawn decides to fidget with the school newspaper and change its headline, renaming Mr. Feeny as "Principal Weeny." The whole school is amused by the practical joke, except Mr. Feeny, who goes to every classroom demanding that the perpetrator reveal himself. However, Shawn decides to remain silent. He takes his pranks to the next level after changing the name on Mr. Feeny's door to "Principal Weeny." Cory gets called into Mr. Feeny's office after Janitor Bud said that he saw Cory and an unidentified person go into the room. Cory insists that he is innocent but until he chooses to name the real culprit, Feeny holds him responsible. Feeny gives him an ultimatum— either name the culprit or face suspension. Feeling scared, Cory seeks advice from Amy and Alan, who both have different perspectives. The next day, Mr. Turner explains to a troubled Cory that the reason Mr. Feeny is so upset is because since he is a new principal, his authority could be jeopardized because of the joke. During his meeting with Feeny, Cory decides to take the blame to protect Shawn, whose parents threatened to send to military school. Feeny is not amused as principal, but as Cory's teacher and neighbor sees integrity in Cory's actions and willingness to protect his friend. He decides to let Cory off the hook, but gives him detention. In the post-credits, Shawn accidentally confesses his involvement in front of Feeny. However, instead of getting punished, Feeny decides to keep a close eye on Shawn for the rest of high school. Meanwhile, Eric, who is facing a status problem, courts a new senior girl in school named Desiree, who ultimately turns him into her personal slave. Guest stars: Danny McNulty as Harley, Jason Marsden as Jason, Sydney Bennett as Desiree, Blake Soper as Joey, Jill Novick as Molly Absent: Danielle Fishel as Topanga Lawrence
26	4	"Me and Mr. Joad"	David Trainer	Jeff Menell	October 14, 1994	B628	18.6
The Grapes of Wrath is being taught by Mr. Turner to Cory's class and after being annoyed by the class's response to his teaching methods, makes a deal with them. If they read the book and discuss the topic, the test will be cancelled. Turner's methods soon reach Mr. Feeny, who expresses his dismay reasoning that students will not learn if they do need feel the need to. Turner disagrees, which eventually leads to him and Feeny making a bet on whose teaching methods should be used. However, Turner decides to bend his promise to the class and give the test anyway. Feeling inspired by the book, Cory leads his classmates on a "strike," as they march out of Turner's class and into the cafeteria demanding steak and lobster. Eventually, Mr. Feeny steps in and puts Cory's protest to halt after threatening to cancel school activities. Cory continues to march out of school, only to find that Shawn is the only person behind him. At home, Cory gets punished, however, Mr. Turner arrives taking full responsibility and explains to Cory that students cannot go on strike. In the backyard, Turner and Cory go to see Feeny and extend their apologies. Meanwhile, Jason's and Eric's friendship is tested after Desiree tries to drive a wedge between them so that she have Eric's services all to herself. However, Eric decides to stick by his friend and breaks up with Desiree. Guest stars: Sydney Bennett as Desiree, Jason Marsden as Jason Absent: Danielle Fishel as Topanga Lawrence, Lily Nicksay as Morgan Matthews
27	5	"The Uninvited"	David Trainer	Susan Estelle Jansen	October 21, 1994	B624	19.0
Everyone at John Adams High is highly anticipating popular-girl Melissa's party. Though, everyone desires to get invited to her exclusive-party, few actually get the privilege. Among those is Cory who, after seeing several people get rejected, has low hopes for himself. Much to his surprise, however, Melissa hands him an invitation to her party. More surprising is that Shawn, who is clearly more well-known and popular than Cory, was not invited, and after talking with Melissa, Cory finds out that not inviting Shawn was intentional. In the moment, Cory feels cool slick and decides to go to the party even though Shawn is clearly bothered. Upon his arrival to the party, it is unraveled that it is a "geek party." Melissa explains to Cory that all of the cool guys that she invited were not approved by her parents, causing her girlfriends not show up, and eventually the rest of the student body. Cory seems puzzled, but Melissa tells him that parents love him, much to his annoyance and horror. A fellow student arrives and invites Melissa to a "cool party," and she ditches Cory and her own party. Cory decides to leave and goes to Chubbie's and runs into Mr. Turner, who in turn explains to Cory the true meaning of friendship. Cory sees Shawn in the midst of the popular crowd and after seeing his best friend, too, Shawn decides to leave the party. The duo leave and ditch the party saying that it will always be "Cory and Shawn." Meanwhile, Alan mildly throws his back, but pretends to be ill in order to get Amy's attention and sympathy. In the post-credits, Amy shows Alan her recently purchased lingerie outfit, causing Alan to blow off his charade and go upstairs to their bedroom. Guest stars: Danny McNulty as Harley Keiner, Johna Stewart as Melissa Absent: Danielle Fishel as Topanga Lawrence, Lily Nicksay as Morgan Matthews
28	6	"Who's Afraid of Cory Wolf?"	David Trainer	Mark Blutman & Howard Busgang	October 28, 1994	B630	18.0
It's the night of the Halloween party, and Cory decides to blow off the party that he, Shawn, and Topanga are going to since he's allegedly turning into a werewolf. Shawn fails to understand what his friend means so Cory tells him his story in a flashback. Previously, Cory had been taking out the garbage and ran into Mr. Feeny, who told him that a wolf had escaped from the local zoo and may be loose in their area. However, in the bushes, Cory hears a mysterious noise and gets "bitten" by the unidentified figure. The next morning, he feels that he had been growing hair in weird places, and consoles his doubts in Eric, who toys with his mind and tells him that he's turning into a werewolf. Cory decides to skip Turner's class to go to a fortune teller named Madame Ouspenskaya. She tells him various events will occur to show his transition from man to werewolf. And after these events come true, she tells him the final prophecy will occur when he kills the only woman who cares about him— Topanga. On the night of the party, Topanga goes to Cory's room to see if he's ready, but is shooed away. However, she refuses to believe his so-called transition, so she tells Cory that there is no curse and that she cares about him. Then, Cory and Topanga reveal their feelings for each other and kiss. In the post-credits, Feeny tells Cory that the wolf that escaped has been a hoax, since it had merely escaped from its habitat and went to another place in the zoo. Feeling relieved, Cory checks the bush where he heard the "wolf," and finds out that it was a cute rabbit. However, the rabbit growls at Cory, scaring him inside the house. Meanwhile, Alan and Amy are searching all the soda cans after hearing that a robbery took place, and the robber hid the stolen jewelry in a soda can. Guest star: Don Calfa as Frank Special appearance: Phyllis Diller as Madame Ouspenskaya
29	7	"Wake Up, Little Cory"	David Trainer	Glen Merzer	November 4, 1994	B627	18.8
When the class cannot understand Much Ado About Nothing, Mr. Turner launches a new controversial project: he asks his students to videotape each other with their views on love and sex. However, when Cory and Topanga stay overnight at the school to finish their project, they themselves become a scandal story, angering Topanga. Guest stars: Danny McNulty as Harley Keiner, Blake Soper as Joey, Bob Larkin as Janitor Bud Absent: Lily Nicksay as Morgan Matthews
30	8	"Band on the Run"	David Trainer	Mark Blutman & Howard Busgang	November 11, 1994	B631	20.3
Cory and Shawn pretend that they're in a band so that they can impress girls. This inspires Alan to connect with his former bandmates. But while this creates some problems for him, Cory and Shawn face a bigger dilemma: they are accidentally booked as the entertainment for the school dance. Special guest stars: Micky Dolenz as Gordy, Rick Nielsen as Norm, Billy Vera as Larry Guest stars: Jhoanna Trias as Sonia, Jewelie Hull as Sherry, Rembrandt as Scream, Adam Scott as Senior, Matthew Stephen Liu as Thor, Andrew Fuentes as Flip Absent: Lily Nicksay as Morgan Matthews
31	9	"Fear Strikes Out"	David Trainer	Susan Estelle Jansen	November 18, 1994	B632	19.3
Cory and Shawn go to a make-out party. But when Cory cannot get through "seven minutes in heaven" with Topanga, he becomes the laughingstock of the school. Guest stars: Danny McNulty as Harley Keiner, Blake Soper as Joey, Ethan Suplee as Frankie, Darlene Vogel as Katherine "Kat" Tompkins, David Grieco as Donovan, Benny Grant as John
32	10	"Sister Theresa"	David Trainer	Jeff C. Sherman	November 25, 1994	B633	15.5
Cory wins a girl's heart with a little politeness – but he better stay respectful, because she's Harley Keiner's kid sister, Theresa, also known as "T.K.", who never takes no for an answer. Guest stars: Danny McNulty as Harley Keiner, Blake Soper as Joey, Danielle Harris as Theresa "T.K." Keiner, Ethan Suplee as Frankie, Herschel Sparber as Delivery Guy Absent: Danielle Fishel as Topanga Lawrence
33	11	"The Beard"	David Trainer	Jeff Menell	December 9, 1994	B629	17.2
When Shawn cannot decide between two girls, he asks Cory to date one of them while he gets to know the other. However, Cory falls for the girl he's supposed to "hold" for Shawn. Guest stars: Blake Soper as Joey, John Capodice as Chubbie, Lenny Wolpe as Car Dealer, Ethan Suplee as Frankie, Haylie Johnson as Linda, Molly Morgan as Stacy, Joshua Wiener as Roy Absent: Danielle Fishel as Topanga Lawrence, Lily Nicksay as Morgan Matthews
34	12	"Turnaround"	David Trainer	Michele Palermo	December 16, 1994	B634	17.5
A "turnaround" dance gives girls a chance to ask guys out, but that does not take any pressure off Cory, who now worries about who'll ask him, if anyone. Very unfortunately for Cory, it may turn out to be a dance abundant in rejection. Guest stars: Darlene Vogel as Katherine "Kat" Tompkins, Natanya Ross as Ingrid, Marne Patterson as Allison, Jennifer Banko as Becky, Will Estes as Alex, Nick Banko as Boy
35	13	"Cyrano"	David Trainer	Susan Estelle Jansen	January 6, 1995	B635	22.1
Cory and Shawn help Frankie express his feelings to a schoolmate, who turns out to be Harley's girlfriend. Also, Alan makes a bad choice for his anniversary present. Now, they must all learn what women want. Guest stars: Danny McNulty as Harley Keiner, Blake Soper as Joey, Ethan Suplee as Frankie, Mathea Webb as Gloria Absent: Lily Nicksay as Morgan Matthews
36	14	"I Am Not a Crook"	David Trainer	Steve Young	January 13, 1995	B636	18.7
Shawn nominates Cory for class president and manages the campaign. But will Cory keep his cool when his initial campaign platform of honesty collapses, or will he just become another "politician"? Guest stars: Jonathan Charles Kaplan as Alvin, Shay Astar as Paula, Brandon Adams as Alex, Anndi McAfee as Jennifer Absent: Lily Nicksay as Morgan Matthews
37	15	"Breaking Up Is Really, Really Hard to Do"	Jeff McCracken	Mark Blutman & Howard Busgang	January 27, 1995	B637	20.9
Cory intended to get a date for a "couples" party, but ended up agreeing to a real relationship with Wendy. Shawn nudges him to end the relationship before it goes on too long. But Cory cannot find the nerve to dump her. She wants a long term relationship. To Cory, this girl seems like she is insane. She goes to his house and cooks meals with his mother, buys socks for him, asks about his summer plans, and more. Will they really be stuck together forever? Guest stars: Jason Marsden as Jason, Jessica Wesson as Wendy, Katy Barnhill as Lori, Katie Jane Johnston as Bonnie, Musetta Vander as Dominique Absent: Danielle Fishel as Topanga Lawrence
38	16	"Danger Boy"	David Trainer	Glen Merzer	February 3, 1995	B638	19.6
When Eric's girlfriend's younger cousin comes to town, Eric asks Shawn – instead of Cory – out on a double date, angering Cory and leading him to confront Eric in front of the girls. Also, Mr. Feeny is insulted when the staff assumes he wants to head the most boring club. After Cory and Feeny have a talk about how offended they are by Eric and Mr. Turner, this leads both Cory and Feeny to seek out a more reckless image - riding the most dangerous roller coaster. Guest stars: Monty Hoffman as Chubbie, Kathy Kinney as Rifkin, McNally Sagal as Trisha Stone, Heidi Lucas as Kim, Terry Crisp as Elvis, Mena Suvari as Laura, Phillip Simon as Rodique, Harley Zumbrum as Swindell Absent: Danielle Fishel as Topanga Lawrence
39	17	"On the Air"	David Trainer	Mark Blutman & Howard Busgang	February 10, 1995	B640	18.8
The school's radio station is so boring! Cory and Shawn can't even make it more interesting until they hit on the one thing that really gets people's attention: "Lunchtime Lust." Will the teachers let them get away with it? Meanwhile, Eric enters a magazine sweepstakes. Special guest star: Robin Leach as himself Guest stars: Jonathan Charles Kaplan as Alvin, Hillary Tuck as Sarah, Laurie Fortier as Jasmine, Justin Thomson as Ludwig, Grant Gelt as Spencer Absent: Danielle Fishel as Topanga Lawrence
40	18	"By Hook or By Crook"	David Trainer	Jeff Menell	February 17, 1995	B639	17.7
An attractive history tutor helps Eric prepare for a test that might raise his grade average enough to allow him to go on a school trip to Europe, then offers to help him cheat because she finds him attractive; Cory is out sick and tells Topanga he had mono from kissing another girl. Guest stars: Jason Marsden as Jason, Herschel Sparber as Uncle Mike, Terri Ivens as Torie Absent: Lily Nicksay as Morgan Matthews
41	19	"Wrong Side of the Tracks"	David Trainer	Susan Estelle Jansen	February 24, 1995	B641	17.9
A demoralized (disheartened) Shawn hangs out with Harley Keiner and his thugs, much to Cory and Mr. Turner's dismay when he gets dumped by a nice girl because of his family's poverty. Meanwhile, Jason gives Eric a tape to listen to while he falls asleep to make Eric a better skater for his date with Valerie. While Eric is asleep, he gets a dream skating lesson from Nancy Kerrigan. Special guest star: Nancy Kerrigan as herself Guest stars: Jason Marsden as Jason, Blake Soper as Joey, Ethan Suplee as Frankie, Kenny Johnston as Harley Keiner, Khrystee Clark as Valerie, Becky Herbst as Jill, Shay Astar as Mindy Note: Danny McNulty, who portrayed Harley Keiner, was replaced by Kenny Johnston for the role.
42	20	"Pop Quiz"	David Trainer	Story by : Kevin Kelton & Robert Kurtz & Eric Brand; Teleplay by : Kevin Kelton	March 10, 1995	B642	19.1
Shawn and Cory accidentally discover the date and topic of a forthcoming test, leading to them getting good grades. Since Frankie and Joey are "lackeys" they search for a new leader after Harley Keiner is sent off to a reform school. They attempt to make Eric their new leader by copying him and following him around, and even after he rejects Frankie and Joey, they still want him as a leader. This is until they meet the new trouble student Griff Hawkins. They are immediately impressed by him due to his already increasing popularity, and try to get him to be their leader. After Griff gets into trouble with a football player, Frankie and Joey help defend him, and ultimately impress Griff when he agrees to being their leader. Guest stars: Blake Soper as Joey, Ethan Suplee as Frankie, Adam Scott (Note: This is Scott's second appearance; however, this starts his guest work playing a new recurring character.) as Griff Hawkins, Susan Knight as Miss Gill, Laurie Fortier as Jasmine, Eric Balfour as Tommy Absent: Danielle Fishel as Topanga Lawrence
43	21	"The Thrilla' in Phila'"	David Trainer	Mark Blutman & Howard Busgang	May 5, 1995	B645	17.8
Cory may finally have an extracurricular activity to list in the yearbook after he's bullied into joining the high school's wrestling team by Griff Hawkins and his band of thugs. Cory and Topanga's interest in each other is revealed for the first time. Guest stars: Robert Goulet as himself, Leon Allen White as Vader, Blake Soper as Joey, Yasmine Bleeth as herself, Adam Scott as Griff Hawkins, Ethan Suplee as Frankie, Jared Murphy as Matt, Charles Carpenter as Savage, Kelly Packard as Candy Absent: Lily Nicksay as Morgan Matthews
44	22	"Career Day"	David Trainer	Matthew Nelson	May 12, 1995	B643	15.1
Turner's class has a career day. Alan and Cory feel embarrassed about Alan being a grocer, and Chet Hunter unexpectedly shows up, spewing stories of his "ideas." During lunch, Chet tells Shawn that his mother left again, and plans to go after her; he asks Shawn to go with him. That night, Shawn goes to Turner's home, interrupting Turner and Kat's evening, and ends up falling asleep on the couch. Feeny warns Turner about a fine line between authority figure and chum after Turner drops Shawn off at the Matthews. Chet shows up and asks the Matthews to take care of Shawn as he goes to track Virna down. Eric and Jason study for their SATs. Guest stars: Jason Marsden as Jason, Blake Clark as Chet Hunter, Darlene Vogel as Katherine "Kat" Tompkins, Peter Tork as Jedediah Lawrence, Will Estes as Alex Absent: Lily Nicksay as Morgan Matthews
45	23	"Home"	David Kendall	Jeff C. Sherman	May 19, 1995	B644	14.2
After staying with Cory's family for three weeks and not exactly fitting in, Shawn searches for a more permanent home. Meanwhile, Feeny takes advantage of the fact that Eric needs help to study for SATs by making him do yard work. Guest stars: Jason Marsden as Jason, Blake Clark as Chet Hunter, Darlene Vogel as Katherine "Kat" Tompkins, Ivory Ocean as Policeman Note: Lily Nicksay, who portrays Morgan Matthews, makes her final appearance as Morgan in the series. She will return next season as a recurring character and will be portrayed by Lindsay Ridgeway. Absent: Danielle Fishel as Topanga Lawrence
