= Pilot (Boy Meets World) =

- Boy Meets World episode
- Cory Matthews (Ben Savage) and brother Eric (Will Friedle) talk about Eric's date with Heather.
- Episode no.: Season 1 Episode 1
- Directed by: John Tracy
- Written by: Michael Jacobs; April Kelly
- Production code: B601
- Original air date: September 24, 1993

Guest appearances
- Chauncey Leopardi as Nicholas; Cynthia Mace as Evelyn; Krystin Moore as Vanessa Kincaid

Episode chronology
| ← Previous — | Next → "On the Fence" |

"Pilot" is the first episode of the American coming-of-age sitcom Boy Meets World. It premiered on ABC in the United States on September 24, 1993. The episode was written by Michael Jacobs and April Kelly and directed by John Tracy.

The pilot introduces viewers to Cory Matthews and his friends, along with members of his immediate family. In the episode, Cory is given detention from his 6th grade teacher Mr. Feeny for attempting to listen to a Philadelphia Phillies baseball game during class. The class is taught about the value of love by reading Romeo and Juliet, but Cory struggles to see girls and love as "good" when his brother Eric takes a girl to see a baseball game instead of him. Eric's date is unsuccessful, but Cory advises Eric to give the girl another chance after a conversation with Mr. Feeny while in detention.

Seven characters receive top billing in the episode: Cory Matthews (Ben Savage); Shawn Hunter (Rider Strong); George Feeny (William Daniels); Eric Matthews (Will Friedle); Alan Matthews (William Russ); Amy Matthews (Betsy Randle) and Morgan Matthews (Lily Nicksay). Krystin Moore made a guest appearance as Vanessa Kincaid, while Chauncey Leopardi appeared as Nicholas and Cynthia Mace played Evelyn.

The show aired from its premiere as part of ABC's popular TGIF comedy block on Friday, broadcast at 8.30 between Family Matters and Step by Step. It debuted to 16.5 million viewers, ranking as the fifth highest rated broadcast of the night, and tied 48th ranked of the week.

== Plot ==
Cory Matthews is a young kid in the sixth grade who is confused about girls. His teacher, Mr. Feeny, gives him detention for listening to a Phillies baseball game during class. Afterward, Feeny continues his lecture teaching the meaning and values of Romeo and Juliet. Cory initially does not like girls, which is the opposite of his best friend Shawn Hunter and older brother Eric, who is goofy and frequently idiotic. In the episode, it is later revealed the reason Cory does not like girls so much is that Eric took his girlfriend, Heather, instead of Cory, to see a Phillies game. In detention, Mr. Feeny pays no attention to Cory, who starts his wheedling to get Feeny's attention, Mr. Feeny goes into a speech about love and its many interpretations by poets, playwrights, and philosophers. Cory comes back home and apologizes to his family. When Eric comes back from the game, miserable that his nerves ruined his date with Heather, Cory convinces him to call her back.

== Production ==
=== Conception ===
When ABC released their fall schedule for the 1993-94 season, The New York Times wrote that the network was creating "a new Friday night line-up that is explicitly aimed at younger viewers". Their description of Boy Meets World was a show "about life seen through the eyes of an 11-year-old boy".

=== Casting ===
The series is considered a coming-of-age story for the 1990s in a similar vein to the 1960s-set The Wonder Years, which starred Fred Savage and ran from 1988 until the end of the 1992–93 season. Savage, now 17, was considered too old to take on another similar role, but his younger brother Ben, who had made a cameo in The Wonder Years in 1990 at the age of 10 and had recently appeared in the miniseries Wild Palms, was given the role of Cory Matthews. One of the other key castings was William Daniels as George Feeny, Cory's teacher and nemesis; Daniels had previously held a high-profile role on St. Elsewhere in the 1980s. The pilot episode was filmed in 1992.

== Reception ==
=== Ratings ===
The pilot episode premiered on ABC on September 24, 1993, at 8.30pm, following Family Matters and before Step by Step. On the night it faced competition from hour-long shows The Adventures of Brisco County, Jr. (Fox) and a special episode of Blossom (NBC), as well as half-hour comedy Family Album (CBS) in the same timeslot. It debuted to 16.5 million viewers, ranking it as the fifth highest-viewed show of the night, and tied with another ABC series Matlock as the 48th ranked broadcast of the week.

=== Critical reception ===
Before the pilot aired, David Zurawik of The Baltimore Sun wrote "Predicting Nielsen success for Boy Meets World...is not a particularly daring or incisive call. It's mainly based on scheduling and stars." He continued "Forget quality, these are kids we're programming for on Friday nights. Here's where you have to give ABC some credit for going an extra mile and adding William Daniels...to the cast as Cory's nemesis, his sixth-grade teacher, Mr. Feeny. The confrontation between the hey-I'm-just-a-kid Cory and the arch-and-starch Feeny makes this series something an adult doesn't have to feel ashamed of watching." He ultimately gave it two-and-a-half stars out of four, "but I won't argue with anyone who wants to give it 3 stars."
