= An Affair to Forget =

An Affair to Forget may refer to:

- "An Affair to Forget" (Frasier), an episode of the US sitcom Frasier
- "An Affair to Forget" (Will & Grace), an episode of the US sitcom Will & Grace
- "An Affair to Forget", an episode of the US sitcom The Mary Tyler Moore Show
- "An Affair to Forget", an episode of the Canadian television serial comedy Butch Patterson: Private Dick
- "An Affair to Forget", an episode of the British medical drama Holby City
- "An Affair to Forget", an episode of the US sitcom The Parent 'Hood
- "An Affair to Forget", an episode of the Australian television drama McLeod's Daughters
- "An Affair to Forget", an episode of the US sitcom Three's Company
- "An Affair to Forget", an episode of the US sitcom Who's the Boss?
- "An Affair to Forget", an episode of the US sitcom Laverne & Shirley
- "An Affair to Forget", an episode of the US sitcom Boy Meets World
- "An Affair to Forget", an episode of the US sitcom Mama's Family
