= On the Fence =

On the Fence may refer to:

- "On the Fence" (Boy Meets World), a 1993 television episode
- "On the Fence" (White Collar), a 2011 television episode
