= The Chosen One (2007 film) =

- Film poster
- Directed by: Chris Lackey
- Written by: Chad Fifer; Chris Lackey
- Produced by: Andreas Olavarria
- Starring: Chad Fifer; Lance Henriksen
- Release date: October 13, 2007
- Running time: 100 minutes
- Country: United States
- Language: English

The Chosen One is a 2007 American animated action comedy film. It was directed by Chris Lackey, written by Chad Fifer and Chris Lackey, produced by Andreas Olavarria, and starring Chad Fifer, Tim Curry, Traci Lords and Lance Henriksen.

== Voice cast ==
- Chad Fifer as Lou Hanske
- Chris Sarandon as Zebulon "Zeb" Kirk
- Danielle Fishel as Donna Goldstein
- Tim Curry as Lucifer
- Lance Henriksen as Cardinal Fred
- Laura Prepon as Rachel Cruz
- Debra Wilson as Akia May
- Traci Lords as Ms. Sultry
- Scott MacDonell as Gary / Various
- Andreas Olavarria as Claude / Various
