= Cory Matthews =

- Boy Meets World character
- Ben Savage as Cory Matthews in Girl Meets World (2014)
- First appearance: "Pilot"; Boy Meets World; September 24, 1993
- Last appearance: "Girl Meets Goodbye"; Girl Meets World; January 20, 2017
- Created by: Michael Jacobs; April Kelly
- Portrayed by: Ben Savage

In-universe information
- Full name: Cornelius Alan Matthews
- Occupation: History Teacher; Co-owner of Topanga's; Magazine salesman (formerly)
- Affiliation: John Quincy Adams Middle School (formerly); Abigail Adams High School
- Family: Alan Matthews (father); Amy Matthews (mother); Eric Matthews (brother); Joshua Matthews (brother); Morgan Matthews (sister)
- Spouse: Topanga Lawrence
- Children: Riley Matthews (daughter); August Matthews (son)
- Relatives: Bernice Matthews (grandmother)
- Nationality: American

Cornelius Alan Matthews is one of the main characters appearing on the 1993 family sitcom Boy Meets World and its 2014 sequel Girl Meets World, both created by Michael Jacobs and April Kelly. He is portrayed by Ben Savage.

== Biography ==
During the first season, 11-year-old Cory Matthews starts 6th grade at Jefferson Elementary School in Philadelphia, Pennsylvania, with his friend Shawn Hunter and love interest Topanga Lawrence and was taught by Mr. George Feeny.

In the second season, he begins attending John Adams JR/SR High School, which he attends through this season to season five. During high school, the trio navigate adolescence, and he explores his relationship with Topanga. Ultimately, the pair become engaged at graduation.

He attends his first two years of college at Penbrooke University. He marries Topanga in their sophomore year and later, he moves to New York when his wife accepts an internship at a law firm.

After graduating from college, Matthews becomes a history teacher at John Quincy Adams High School located in New York where he is still married to Topanga, and together they have two kids - August "Auggie" and Riley.

== Other appearances ==
Aside from his leading roles on Boy Meets World and Girl Meets World, Savage reprised the role of Cory Matthews for a commercial for Panera Bread in 2021, alongside Danielle Fishel.

== Reception ==
Throughout the years, many fans have shown their love and fondness of both the character of Matthews and the relationship he has with Topanga Lawrence as well as his lifelong best friend Shawn Hunter. However, some journalists feel as though Matthews is one of the weaker characters in the series, critiquing his infidelity and stubbornness, among other traits.

== See also ==
- List of Boy Meets World characters
