= Danielle Fishel =

American actress (born 1981)

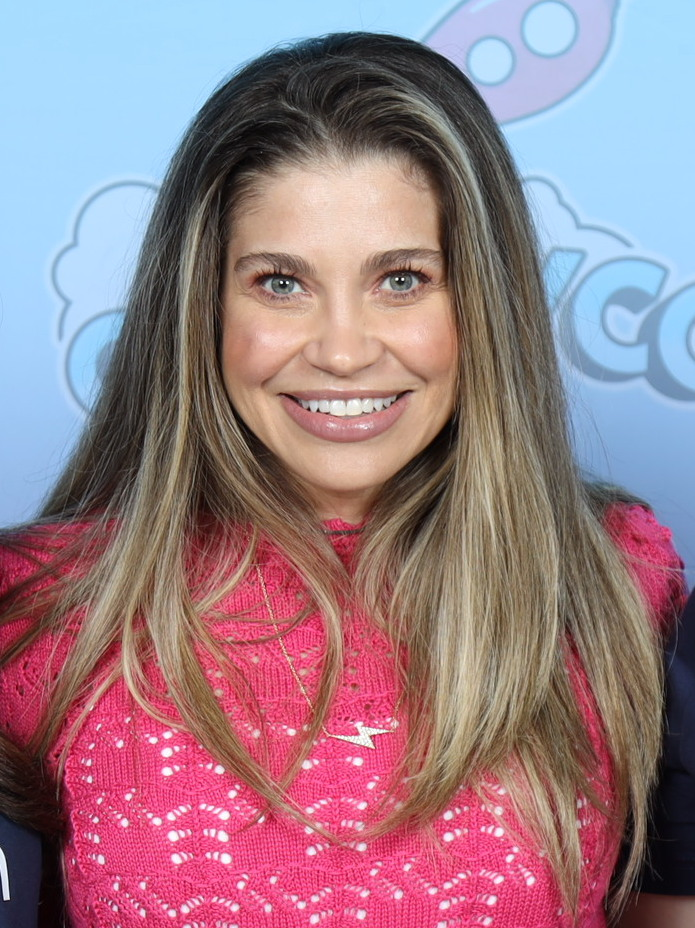
- Fishel at GalaxyCon Richmond in 2023
- Born: Danielle Christine Fishel; May 5, 1981 (age 45); Mesa, Arizona, U.S.
- Education: California State University, Fullerton (BA)
- Occupations: Actress; director
- Years active: 1992–present
- Works: Filmography
- Spouses: Tim Belusko (m. 2013; div. 2016) Jensen Karp (m. 2018)
- Children: 2

Danielle Christine Fishel Karp (/ˈfɪʃəl/ FIH-shəl; née Fishel; born May 5, 1981) is an American actress and director. Her career started in community theater, and she made her screen debut with guest roles on shows such as Full House (1992–1993) and Harry and the Hendersons (1993). Fishel's breakthrough came with the role of Topanga Lawrence on the ABC sitcom Boy Meets World (1993–2000), which she later reprised in its successor, Girl Meets World (2014–2017), on Disney Channel. For the role, she received a YoungStar Award in 1998.

After Boy Meets World, Fishel appeared in a number of films; her first feature film role being in the 2000 comedy Longshot. She also acted in National Lampoon Presents Dorm Daze (2003) and its 2006 sequel, followed by the animated film The Chosen One (2007) and the drama Boiling Pot (2015). Fishel also made her directorial debut in 2016 with episodes of Girl Meets World, and has since directed episodes of other series, including Raven's Home (2019–2022), Coop & Cami Ask the World (2019–2020), Sydney to the Max (2019–2021), Just Roll with It (2020), and more.

Outside of fiction media, Fishel was the host of Style Network's The Dish (2008–2011), and is also a resident reporter on PopSugar, and on their spin-off YouTube channel, PopSugar Girls Guide. In 2025, she was a contestant in the 34th season of Dancing with the Stars, coming in eighth.

== Early life ==
Danielle Christine Fishel was born in Mesa, Arizona, and lived there for 21 days before her parents moved back to California after her father's graduation, where she was raised. She is the daughter of Jennifer, a personal manager, and Rick Fishel, former president of Masimo Corporation. Fishel is of maternal Maltese descent through both maternal grandparents. She graduated from Calabasas High School in Calabasas, California in 1999.

== Career ==
=== 1991–1998: Career beginnings and debut ===
In 1991, at the age of 10, Fishel was discovered in a community theater where she performed in two productions, The Wizard of Oz and Peter Pan. She quickly moved on to do voiceovers and commercials, including several as a Barbie Girl for Mattel. Soon after, she appeared on two episodes of the hit show Full House, guest starring as a character named Jennifer. She also had a small role on Harry and the Hendersons, playing Jessica. Fishel's mother became her full-time manager.

In 1993, at the age of 12, she began her role as Topanga Lawrence-Matthews on the ABC series Boy Meets World. Initially a different actress was cast, but series creator Michael Jacobs did not like her performance and therefore replaced her with Fishel. Originally written as a small part, Topanga became a recurring role. After a successful first year, Fishel became a show regular. The show ended in 2000 after seven years.

Fishel was on the cover of Seventeen magazine in December 1998. She won an award, the 1998 Young Star for Best Performance by a Young Actress in a Comedy TV Series. In June 1999, she was one of "The 21 Hottest Stars Under 21" in Teen People magazine. She was on the cover of GQ magazine's hottest stars to watch in the October 1997 issue. She appeared in the music video for "Until You Loved Me" by Canadian music group The Moffatts.

=== 2003–2011: Films and television presenting ===
Following Boy Meets World, she began to work heavily in television, and in 2003 co-hosted Say What? Karaoke on MTV for one season. She also appeared in several films, including National Lampoon's Dorm Daze. In 2006, she appeared in three made-for-DVD releases: National Lampoon's Dorm Daze 2 (appearing again as "Marla" from the first film), the action film Gamebox 1.0 (playing a dual role), and The Chosen One, an independent animated film in which she provides the voice of the lead female character.

In 2006, she appeared as a guest on The Tyra Banks Show where she discussed her dramatic weight loss with the use of the Nutrisystems Diet. Following her appearance, she became a spokeswoman for Nutrisystem. She also became a special correspondent for The Tyra Banks Show, starting in early February 2007. By 2010, she had gained some of the weight back, and told People magazine she could not maintain her Nutrisystem weight.

From August 2008 to March 2011, Fishel hosted The Dish for the Style Network, which satirized pop culture in a format similar to sister network E!'s The Soup. She was also on Fuse TV as host of The Fuse 20, and was a guest star on the round table on an episode of Chelsea Lately. In 2012, she became the host of MSN TV's Last Night on TV.

=== 2013–present: Current work ===
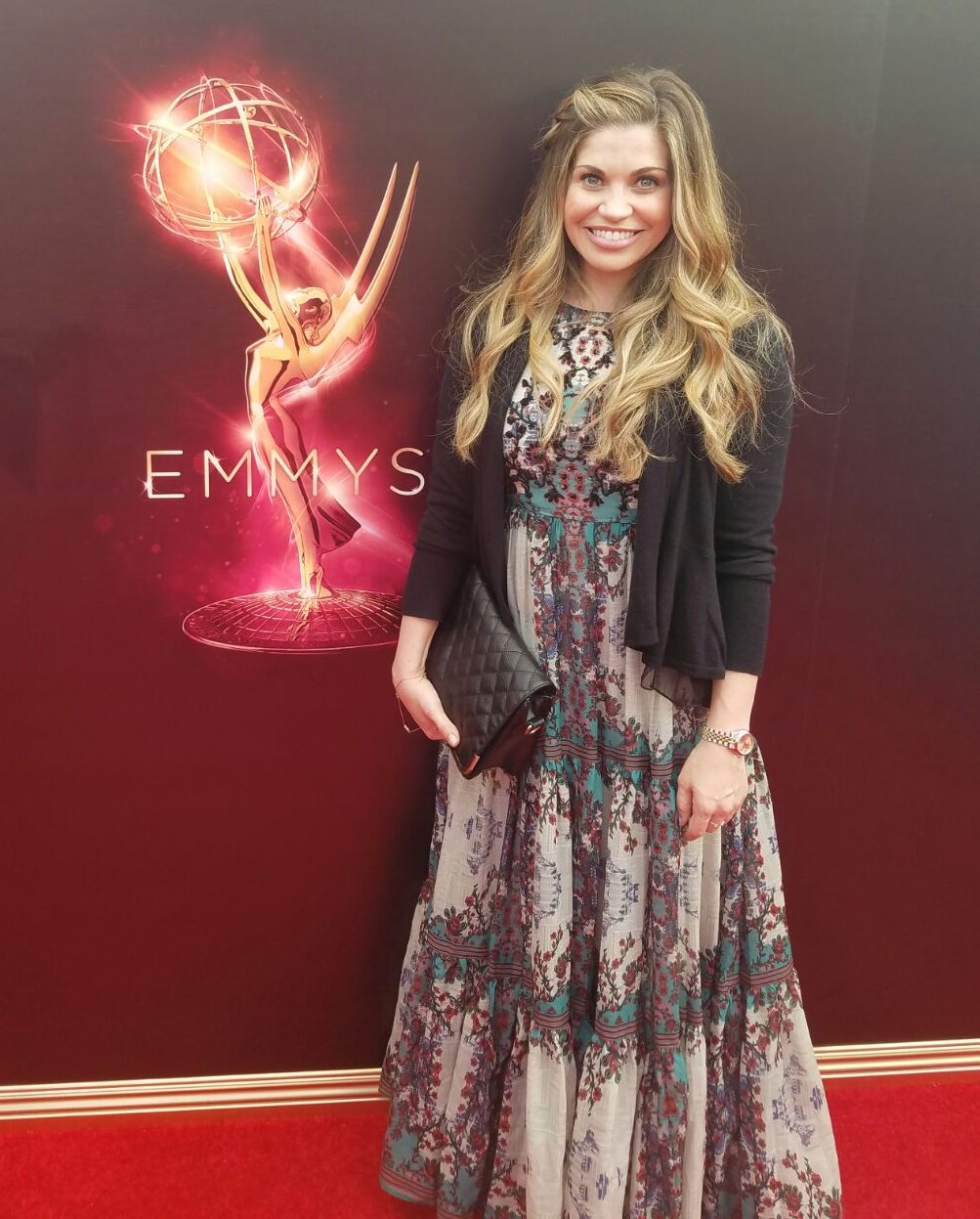
Fishel at the 68th Primetime Emmy Awards (2016)

In 2013, she starred in the drama Boiling Pot (released in 2015), which is based on true events of racism that occurred on college campuses across the country during the 2008 United States presidential election. The film also stars Louis Gossett Jr., Keith David, M. Emmet Walsh, and John Heard. Fishel plays an average college girl, naive regarding racism and unaware of its existence. In October 2013, she was featured in Clapping for the Wrong Reasons, a short film to promote Childish Gambino's second studio album, Because the Internet.

In 2014, she reprised her role of Topanga Lawrence-Matthews in the Boy Meets World spin-off series, Girl Meets World. The series premiered on Disney Channel on June 27, 2014, and features Topanga and her Boy Meets World love interest Cory Matthews (Ben Savage) married in their adult years with two children. The series follows Cory and Topanga's daughter Riley (Rowan Blanchard) and her friend, Maya (Sabrina Carpenter) as she enters middle school and tries to navigate through life. The series ended on January 20, 2017.

In an episode that aired January 9, 2018, she competed against actor Jonathan Lipnicki on TBS's Drop the Mic.

She has hosted the Boy Meets World rewatch podcast Pod Meets World with Rider Strong and Will Friedle since 2022.

In 2025, she competed on season 34 of Dancing with the Stars, being eliminated from the show on November 4, 2025, coming in 8th.

In 2026 Fishel starred in a youtube series entitled Dugout Dads about a baseball Dad, played by The Sandlot's Patrick Renna, trying to teach youth baseball players, parents, and coaches that the game of baseball is supposed to be fun. Fishel starred as Renna's character's wife in the series.

== Personal life ==
At age 27, Fishel began attending California State University, Fullerton (CSUF), graduating in 2013. During her university studies, she became a math tutor, leading her to meet fellow student Tim Belusko. After over three years of dating, she became engaged to Belusko in May 2012. They married in Los Angeles on October 19, 2013, and Ben Savage and Home Improvement cast member Jonathan Taylor Thomas were said to be in attendance. In May 2016, it was reported that she had filed for divorce the previous year; this was finalized in March 2016.

In December 2007, Fishel was arrested on a drunk driving warrant. She was released from jail shortly after her arrest.

On July 4, 2017, toward the end of episode #303 of his podcast Get Up On This, Jensen Karp announced that he was dating Fishel. On March 22, 2018, the couple were engaged and married on November 4. Their first son was born on June 24, 2019, arriving a month early. He spent three weeks in the neonatal intensive care unit. Fishel said that fluid was found in his lungs that had not been present prior. Fishel and Karp had a second son on August 29, 2021.

On August 19, 2024, Fishel announced on her podcast, Pod Meets World, that she had been diagnosed with breast cancer.

== Filmography ==
=== Television ===
Year	Title	Role	Notes
1992–1993	Full House	Jennifer P.	2 episodes
1993	Harry and the Hendersons	Jessica	Episode: "The Long Goodbyes: Part 2"
1993–2000	Boy Meets World	Topanga Lawrence	Recurring role (season 1); main role (season 2–7)
1996	Kirk	Heather	Episode: "Stuck on You"
1997	ABC TGIF	Topanga	Episode: "Frightful Halloween Bash"
2000	Rocket's Red Glare	Sarah Miller	Television film
2001–2002	Nikki	Stacy	2 episodes
2002	The Nightmare Room	Counselor	Episode: "Camp Nowhere: Part 1"
2003	Yes, Dear	Katie	Episode: "Sorority Girl"
2012	The Soup	Lizdsay Taylorhan / Herself	Episode: "The Soup Salutes WWE Pile Driving Clips in Your Face"
2014–2017	Girl Meets World	Topanga Lawrence-Matthews	Main role; also co-producer (51 episodes), director (4 episodes), writer (1 episode)
2015–2016	Gravity Falls	Pyronica (voice)	3 episodes
2019	Star vs. the Forces of Evil	Librarian (voice)	Episode: "Kelly's World"
Reality
2003	Say What? Karaoke	Herself / Host	
2008–2011	The Dish	Herself / Host	
2009	The Fuse 20	Herself / Host	
2018	Drop the Mic	Herself	Episode: "Danielle Fishel vs. Jonathan Lipnicki / Shania Twain vs. Meghan Trainor"
2022, 2025	The Masked Singer	Herself	Guest; S08E06, S13E10
2025	Dancing with the Stars	Contestant	Season 34

=== Film ===
Year	Title	Role	Notes
2000	Longshot	Gloria	
2003	National Lampoon Presents Dorm Daze	Marla	
2004	Gamebox 1.0	Kate/Princess	
2006	National Lampoon's Dorm Daze 2	Marla	
2007	The Chosen One	Donna Goldstein	Voice role
2013	Clapping for the Wrong Reasons	Herself	Short film
2015	Boiling Pot	Valerie Davis	

=== Director ===
Year	Title	Notes
2016–2017	Girl Meets World	4 episodes
2019–2021	Sydney to the Max	11 episodes
2019–2022	Raven's Home	7 episodes
2019–2020	Coop & Cami Ask the World	2 episodes
2020	Just Roll with It	Episode: "Aliens Among Us"
2022–2023	The Villains of Valley View	7 episodes
2023–2025	Lopez vs Lopez	8 episodes
2023	Pretty Freekin Scary	4 episodes
2025	Wizards Beyond Waverly Place	2 episodes
2025	Shifting Gears	Episode: "Grief"
2025	Electric Bloom	3 episodes
2025	Vampirina: Teenage Vampire	3 episodes

== Accolades ==
Year	Association	Category	Work	Result	Ref.
1996	Young Artist Awards	Best Performance by a Young Actress: TV Comedy Series	Boy Meets World	Nominated	
1997	Young Artist Awards	Best Performance in a TV Comedy: Supporting Young Actress	Boy Meets World	Nominated	
1998	YoungStar Awards	Best Performance by a Young Actress in a Comedy TV Series	Boy Meets World	Won	
2000	YoungStar Awards	Best Young Actress/Performance in a Comedy TV Series	Boy Meets World	Nominated	
