= April Kelly =

American television writer and producer

April Kelly (born April Kalinowski) is an American television writer and producer, who co-created Boy Meets World and Girl Meets World with Michael Jacobs. She is also known for being the writer of multiple short stories and mystery novels, one of which was nominated for a Shamus Award.

== Personal life ==
April Kelly was born on Long Island, New York. She attended the University of South Florida before moving to Los Angeles to begin a career as a writer.

From 1987 to 1991, Kelly took a break from full-time work in television to focus on a four-year homeopathic medicine course in England. During that time Kelly worked as a freelance writer, penning scripts for made-for-TV movies. In 1993, Kelly returned to television, where she co-created the series Boy Meets World.

As of 2000, Kelly now lives on a farm in Tennessee.

== Career ==
April began her career as a writer for Mork & Mindy, where she wrote 15 of the first 52 episodes of the series. She was also a writer on the show Happy Days before becoming a producer on Love, Sidney, 9 to 5, and Teachers Only. She wrote the TV movies I Still Dream of Jeannie, How to Murder a Millionaire and Your Mother Wears Combat Boots (under pseudonym Susan Hunter).

She is best known as the co-creator of Boy Meets World, which ran on ABC from 1993 to 2000, as well as the follow-up show Girl Meets World.

In addition to numerous writing and producing credits, including the TV series The Pursuit of Happiness and Becker, she is also the author of multiple mystery novels, including Winged and Murder in One Take, the latter of which she co-wrote with Marsha Lyons.
