= Betsy Randle =

American actress (born 1955)

- Born: Betsy May Randle; June 24, 1955 (age 70); Chicago, Illinois, U.S.
- Education: New Trier High School
- Alma mater: University of Kansas
- Occupation: Actress
- Years active: 1988–2004; 2014–present
- Known for: Boy Meets World
- Spouse: John Randle
- Children: 2

Betsy May Randle (born June 24, 1955) is an American actress known for her role as Amy Matthews on Boy Meets World which lasted seven seasons.

== Biography ==
Born in Chicago, Randle grew up in the suburb of Glenview. She is a graduate of New Trier High School (class of 1973) and the University of Kansas. Randle is married to film editor John Randle and they have two children, Aaron, who is married and has a child born in 2013, and Jessica. Randle and her family reside in Ojai, California.

== Filmography ==
Year	Title	Role	Notes
1986	Carly Mills	Maggie Wallace	TV movie
1988	Dear John	Fay	Episode: Pilot
1989	Family Ties	Nancy	2-part episode: "All in the Neighborhood"
1989	Baywatch	Candace	Episode: "The Cretin of the Shallows"
1990	Down Home	Amy	Episode: "Down Home"
1990	Open House	Dana	Episode: "First Impressions"
1990	Guess Who's Coming to Christmas?	Suzie	TV movie
1991	Paradise	Ester	Episode: "The Woman"
1991	The Hogan Family	Mrs. Umstead	Episode: "Ho, Ho, Hogans"
1992–93	Home Improvement	Karen Kelly	7 episodes
1993–2000	Boy Meets World	Amy Matthews	Main role
1999	H-E Double Hockey Sticks	Uncredited	
2000	Urban Mythology	Carol Simpson	
2001	The Nightmare Room	Dylan's mother	1 episode
2003	The Beat	Marie Bernard	
2004	Charmed	Mrs. Winterbourne	4 episodes
2014, 2017	Girl Meets World	Amy Matthews	3 episodes
2015–16	Adam Ruins Everything	Donna Rehm	2 episodes
2016	Dirty 30	Todd's Mom	
2018	Eve of Abduction	Doreen	
2020	Painter	Joanne	
2020	To the Beat!: Back 2 School	Principal Margaret Rogers	
2025	Matlock	Gladys Efron	Episode: "Crash Helmets On"
