= List of Girl Meets World episodes =

Girl Meets World is an American comedy television series created by Michael Jacobs and April Kelly that premiered on Disney Channel on June 27, 2014. The series ran for three seasons, consisting of 72 episodes, and concluded on January 20, 2017. The series is a spinoff of Boy Meets World and stars Rowan Blanchard, Ben Savage, Sabrina Carpenter, Peyton Meyer, August Maturo, Danielle Fishel, and Corey Fogelmanis.

The series centers around the life of Riley and her friends and family, particularly their school life, in which Cory is their history teacher. Riley shares a strong relationship with her best friend Maya Hart, who assists her in learning to cope with social and personal issues of adolescence. Several Boy Meets World cast members reprise their roles in the series.

== Series overview ==
| Season | Episodes | Originally released | |
| Season | Episodes | First released | Last released |
|---|---|---|---|
| 1 | 20 | June 27, 2014 | March 27, 2015 |
| Special | | April 17, 2015 | |
| 2 | 30 | May 11, 2015 | March 11, 2016 |
| 3 | 21 | June 3, 2016 | January 20, 2017 |

== Episodes ==
=== Season 1 (2014–15) ===
- While Corey Fogelmanis becomes listed as a main cast member later in the season, he is a guest star for thirteen episodes.

| No. overall | No. in season | Title | Directed by | Written by | Original release date | Prod. code | U.S. viewers (millions) |
|---|---|---|---|---|---|---|---|
| 1 | 1 | "Girl Meets World" | John Whitesell | Michael Jacobs | June 27, 2014 | 101 | 5.16 |
In her bedroom, Riley Matthews and her best friend, Maya Hart, try to sneak out her window to ride the subway, but are stopped by Riley's parents, Cory and Topanga Matthews. Cory and Topanga give them the permission to ride the subway, but only if they make the world theirs, instead of their parents. On the subway, they meet a handsome boy named Lucas Friar, whom Riley immediately develops a crush on. In history class, Cory assigns the class to write an essay on something they would fight for. Riley and Maya decide to fight for no homework, which leads to accidentally setting off a fire alarm sprinkler. Riley winds up choosing to fight for friendship instead, and Cory and Topanga understand Riley is growing up and they need to be there for her. Special guest star: William Daniels as Mr. Feeny Guest stars: Corey Fogelmanis as Farkle, Jackée as Evelyn Rand
| 2 | 2 | "Girl Meets Boy" | Joel Zwick | Michael Jacobs | July 11, 2014 | 102 | 3.23 |
When Cory's plan to get his students to communicate face-to-face fails, he takes away their cell phones and assigns the class to prepare a discussion about whether technology has made people better. The whole class has trouble communicating, except for Maya, who is the only one in the class without a smartphone. The group goes to the library to do their research, where Riley and Lucas connect by talking about their interests and Maya discovers that she is a talented artist when given just a pencil and paper. When Riley tells Cory about her conversation with Lucas, he desperately tries to keep them apart and attempts to do so by returning their phones, once he realizes it was he who prompted these emotions into Riley. Cory gives Maya a smartphone, and says to use it to communicate to him if anything beautiful happens in Riley's life. Cory also buys Maya an art kit, so she can express herself the way she wants to in life. Guest stars: Corey Fogelmanis as Farkle, Danielle Kennedy as Librarian, Taylar Hollomon as Myzell
| 3 | 3 | "Girl Meets Sneak Attack" | Joel Zwick | Cindy Fang | July 18, 2014 | 104 | 2.64 |
Riley becomes jealous when a girl named Missy Bradford starts flirting with Lucas. Consequently, she enlists the help of Maya and Farkle to help her learn to grow up, in hopes that it will make her competition for Missy. After many failed attempts of flirting, Riley discovers that she should enjoy her own age and not hurry to grow up. Meanwhile, Auggie starts acting grown up to impress a girl down the hall named Ava, but Cory and Topanga are not ready for him to grow up yet. Riley tells Auggie that he should enjoy his age and not hurry to grow up either. Guest stars: Corey Fogelmanis as Farkle, Olivia Stuck as Missy, Ava Kolker as Ava
| 4 | 4 | "Girl Meets Father" | Joel Zwick | Randi Barnes | July 25, 2014 | 106 | 3.28 |
Cory struggles with his emotions when Riley wants to attend her first school dance instead of continuing the tradition of the two of them riding the Coney Island Cyclone roller coaster, which they have done every year since Riley was young. Making matters worse, Cory agonizes over Maya's quitting school after he gives her an F on a quiz. When both girls tell him there is nothing more he can teach them, Cory feels he has lost them, though Topanga assures him that his intentions are good, and he will never give up on those he cares about. He asks Maya to sit down and talk, and shows her that she actually knew all of the answers on the quiz. Cory advises Maya to have confidence in herself, and that she does not need to act as if she does not care. Cory then chaperones the school dance and for the last dance, he chooses to do a father-daughter dance with both Riley and Maya. Guest stars: Corey Fogelmanis as Farkle, Sari Arambulo as Allison
| 5 | 5 | "Girl Meets the Truth" | Joel Zwick | Matthew Nelson | August 1, 2014 | 103 | 2.79 |
After Riley lies to Farkle that he did a good job in the school play of Romeo and Juliet, Maya tells her that she needs to learn to tell the truth, even if it means hurting others. Soon after, Maya begins wearing a gold locket. When Maya refuses to tell Riley the truth about where it came from, Riley assumes she stole it, which leads to Maya feeling hurt. After Riley finally tells Farkle he was bad in the school play, he thanks her with an unwanted kiss. Soon after, Lucas comes in and tells Riley that Farkle did not steal his first kiss moment with Riley, because his moment will come. Maya admits that she took the locket from a lost and found, and returns the locket to the little girl to whom it belonged. Meanwhile, Topanga antagonizes Cory after he insults her cooking. Guest star: Corey Fogelmanis as Farkle
| 6 | 6 | "Girl Meets Popular" | Jon Rosenbaum | Jeff Menell | August 8, 2014 | 111 | 2.42 |
Riley gets invited to her first boy-girl party, and expects this to be her ticket to popularity, only to find that it is a "geek party". When Riley realizes that she is adored by the nerds, she decides to become their "queen". By doing so, she reinvents herself to make her something that she is not, only to be popular. Meanwhile, Topanga is knowingly on the wrong side of a case, and channels her inner-former self for motivation to do the right thing. Special guest star: Cloris Leachman as Mrs. Svorski Guest stars: Corey Fogelmanis as Farkle, Willie Garson as Harrison Miller, Cecilia Balagot as Smackle, Mekai Curtis as Shumpert, Nathaniel James Potvin as Academic Top Half Absent: Peyton Meyer as Lucas Friar
| 7 | 7 | "Girl Meets Maya's Mother" | John Whitesell | Matthew Nelson | August 15, 2014 | 112 | 4.08 |
Riley and Maya's art teacher, Ms. Kossal, comments on Maya's art work and suggests she show it at the upcoming art fair. On career day, Stuart Minkus, Farkle's father, visits their school and a battle ensues between him and Topanga. Maya's mother, Katy Hart, fails to show up until the next day to Maya's embarrassment, and reveals she is a waitress but aspires to become an actress. When Riley suggests that Katy attend the art fair to see her daughter's art work, Katy fails to appear again. Riley learns that Katy is afraid of embarrassing Maya; in response, Katy gives Riley a tuna melt from the diner because she knows Riley will give it to Maya, because it is her favorite. Guest stars: Corey Fogelmanis as Farkle, Lee Norris as Minkus, Cheryl Texiera as Katy Hart, Aisha Kabia as Ms. Kossal
| 8 | 8 | "Girl Meets Smackle" | Ben Savage | Teresa Kale | September 12, 2014 | 118 | 2.38 |
Isadora Smackle, a debate champion from a rival school, seeks the affection of her nemesis, Farkle, but he does not share in that feeling. Smackle turns to Riley and Maya to make her beautiful, but Farkle thinks the makeover is an attempt to get an edge on the upcoming debate on beauty. Even with Lucas joining the debate team to help him out, Farkle soon realizes from Smackle how wrong it is to assume. Smackle quickly realizes that Farkle loves Riley and Maya for who they are and not because they are beautiful. Also starring: Corey Fogelmanis as Farkle Guest star: Cecilia Balagot as Smackle, Nathaniel James Potvin as Academic Top Half
| 9 | 9 | "Girl Meets 1961" | Rider Strong | Matthew Nelson | September 19, 2014 | 114 | 2.47 |
Cory's teaching about the 1960s fails to inspire Riley, Maya, Lucas and Farkle, so he assigns his class a project to research their ancestors of the time. Riley finds out about her great-grandmother Rosie McGee who kept a journal and always saw good in other people. Lucas discovers his great-grandfather Merlin Scoggins was a country singer. Farkle's research points him to the manager of Greenwich Village's Café Hey, named Ginsburg, his great-grandfather. He discovers that his grandfather photographed Rosie, Merlin, and a blonde named May Clutterbucket, a young woman whom Maya reluctantly reveals she is related to, because May gave up on things. The four realize they had ancestors who all met that one afternoon, and what they learn about their 1960s counterparts resparks their interest in history. When recording in her journal that May intends to travel to Topanga Canyon, Rosie opines that it is a nice name for something one loves; implying that, 20 years later, Rhiannon named her daughter Topanga as a result of Rosie's encounter with May. Also starring: Corey Fogelmanis as Farkle Absent: August Maturo as Auggie Matthews
| 10 | 10 | "Girl Meets Crazy Hat" | Joel Zwick | Lauren Otero | September 26, 2014 | 107 | 2.50 |
Cory splits the class up into two fake companies. The two companies run on completely different principles, one on customer happiness and one on profits. Riley and Maya meet a businesswoman on the subway, who they first assume is a crazy lady, but when she visits them in class, they discover that she has a building named after her. The girls then make a real company, and learn that helping people is better than profits. Guest stars: Corey Fogelmanis as Farkle, Jackée as Evelyn Rand, Ava Kolker as Ava
| 11 | 11 | "Girl Meets World of Terror" | Joel Zwick | Teresa Kale | October 2, 2014 | 108 | 2.23 |
On Halloween, everyone must confront their greatest fears. Farkle must play baseball in gym class despite being terrified of the ball. Riley goes to a sleepover at Maya's house despite Maya constantly pointing out that Riley has never stayed for a full night before. Meanwhile, Auggie confronts the monster under his bed. In the end, they all realize that what they are afraid of may not be so frightening after all. Guest stars: Corey Fogelmanis as Farkle, Charlotte Rae as Gammy Hart, Michael D. Roberts as Coach Gleason, Nicolas Bechtel as Monster Under the Bed
| 12 | 12 | "Girl Meets the Forgotten" | Joel Zwick | Jeff Menell | October 10, 2014 | 117 | 2.61 |
In an effort to teach his students to remember "the forgotten", Cory assigns Riley, Maya, Lucas and Farkle their school service elective when they show a lack of respect for lunch norms. The girls are assigned cafeteria duty and work with Geralyn Thompson, the cafeteria director, while the boys receive janitorial duty and work with janitor Harley Keiner. The four friends quickly learn that these jobs are less than glamorous, and those who do the work every day are not appreciated. After a week of experiencing these jobs, the four become more appreciative. Riley realizes this lesson about the forgotten also extends to home, and thanks her parents for caring for her and Auggie. Also starring: Corey Fogelmanis as Farkle Guest stars: Danny McNulty as Harley Keiner, Sonya Eddy as Geralyn Thompson Absent: August Maturo as Auggie Matthews
| 13 | 13 | "Girl Meets Flaws" | Joel Zwick | Mark Blutman | October 17, 2014 | 116 | 2.11 |
Graduation and Awards Night is coming up, and Riley is shocked that she has not been nominated for any awards while her friends have. When Farkle is not present to receive his award, everyone becomes concerned because he never misses class. Suspecting that Farkle is skipping class, Riley, Maya, and Lucas learn that Farkle is being bullied by another student named Billy Ross. To help Farkle, Riley comes up with the idea to have everyone write a label on their forehead, describing their "flaw", and Billy is the only one without a label. After the group confronts Billy over his flaw, he allows Farkle to imprint his label and apologizes to him. The group learns that everybody has something that makes them unique, and these qualities should be respected. On Awards Night, Lucas wins the Athlete Award, Maya wins the "Griff Hawkins Totally Cool" Award, and Riley wins the Spirit Award. Also starring: Corey Fogelmanis as Farkle Guest stars: Ava Kolker as Ava, Danny McNulty as Harley Keiner, Zachary Mitchell as Billy Absent: August Maturo as Auggie Matthews
| 14 | 14 | "Girl Meets Friendship" | John Whitesell | Mark Blutman | November 21, 2014 | 109 | 2.21 |
Cory teaches about government as the election for seventh-grade student council nears. Farkle, Riley and Lucas decide to run, but under different forms of government: Farkle as a dictator, Riley as a princess, and Lucas as a president. Soon, their friendship is put to the test when Maya begins revealing secrets from Lucas' private life, including that Lucas misses his previous home in Texas. Riley strongly disagrees with Maya's intentions, and in the end, before the election result is announced, Riley and Maya show a video featuring two of Lucas' friends from Texas, to emphasize the importance of their friendship. Meanwhile, Auggie's difficulty sleeping worries Topanga. They quickly realize that he is not sleeping because he wants both of his parents to be there to tuck him in at night, but they both work. Guest stars: Corey Fogelmanis as Farkle, Aramis Knight as Brandon, Ricky Garcia as Asher
| 15 | 15 | "Girl Meets Brother" | John Whitesell | Randi Barnes & Cindy Fang & Teresa Kale & Lauren Otero | November 28, 2014 | 105 | 2.42 |
On Cory and Topanga's 15th anniversary, Auggie needs a babysitter so his parents can have a date night. Meanwhile, Riley is encouraged by Maya to rebel against her parents so they treat her more like an adult. When Riley comes home and says she wants a later curfew, and should be treated more like an adult, Auggie suggests that Riley could babysit him. When Cory and Topanga are unable to get on the subway, they decide to return home to spy on the kids. They find Maya has come over and Auggie and Riley are arguing, because Auggie wants to play with Riley who wants to watch TV. Cory and Topanga sneak into the apartment and watch to see if Riley can make it up to Auggie. Special guest star: Herbie Hancock as himself Guest star: Corey Fogelmanis as Farkle Absent: Peyton Meyer as Lucas Friar
| 16 | 16 | "Girl Meets Home for the Holidays" | John Whitesell | Jeff Menell | December 5, 2014 | 113 | 2.49 |
Cory's parents, his teenage brother Joshua, and his best friend Shawn Hunter visit for Christmas. Topanga tries to make the perfect holiday dinner to satisfy the guests, especially her mother-in-law. Maya develops a crush on Joshua, while Riley wants to know why Shawn avoids her every time he visits. He admits that after she was born, he felt left behind because his best friend started a family, so he decided to leave New York City. Riley later has Shawn discuss his feelings with her father, and Cory encourages Shawn to find someone and "begin" his life. Riley then puts Shawn and Maya together to figure out their life problems, causing Shawn and Maya to realize how much they are like each other. Guest stars: Corey Fogelmanis as Farkle, Rider Strong as Shawn Hunter, William Russ as Alan Matthews, Betsy Randle as Amy Matthews, Uriah Shelton as Joshua Matthews Absent: Peyton Meyer as Lucas Friar
| 17 | 17 | "Girl Meets Game Night" | Michael Kelly | Cindy Fang & Lauren Otero & Randi Barnes | January 9, 2015 | 115 | 2.64 |
Family Game Night is a monthly tradition at the Matthews' apartment, and Cory, Topanga, Riley and Auggie are set to play, with Auggie inviting a special family member, Uncle Josh. Riley's friends-first attitude gets her into deep trouble, when she invites Maya, Lucas and Farkle to the occasion. Ava eventually shows up as well and takes part in the game with Auggie. Cory stresses the importance of family with the game night, but is agitated over the four extra guests. Maya, on the other hand, is delighted over Josh being there; he decides to emcee the game after she gets too close. As the game progresses, it becomes evident how the friends interfere. Later, Riley has a chance to win, but realizing from Maya the value of simply playing with her family, she decides to go with the longer version of the game, where even the friends prove to be valuable in getting through it. The group discovers the "long game" actually is a game which parallels life. Also starring: Corey Fogelmanis as Farkle Guest stars: Ava Kolker as Ava, Uriah Shelton as Joshua Matthews
| 18 | 18 | "Girl Meets Master Plan" | Jon Rosenbaum | Michael Jacobs | January 16, 2015 | 119 | 2.71 |
It is Maya's fourteenth birthday, and Riley and the others have something special planned when Shawn comes to visit. They want to set Shawn up with Maya's mother. When Maya hears this, she dislikes the idea because she thinks her mom just drives men away and fears this will happen to Shawn. This changes though when Shawn urges Katy to reveal the truth of what happened with Maya's father. Also starring: Corey Fogelmanis as Farkle Guest stars: Rider Strong as Shawn Hunter, Cheryl Texiera as Katy Hart Absent: August Maturo as Auggie Matthews
| 19 | 19 | "Girl Meets Farkle's Choice" | John Whitesell | Mark Blutman | February 6, 2015 | 110 | 2.25 |
Farkle is nominated for a Buggie Award, and is faced with the dilemma of taking either Riley or Maya with him to the ceremony. After he goes on a date with both of them, the girls compete in an attempt to influence him. When it reaches the point which they are fighting over him, Farkle chooses to attend the award show alone because he does not want to see them fight, and both girls are left ashamed by their actions. In the end, Riley and Maya show up at the ceremony to support their friend. As for the award itself, Farkle finishes second to Smackle. Meanwhile, Topanga starts a children's book club; with Ava and her mother Judy in attendance, and Topanga finally sees where Ava has picked up her attitude and manners. Special guest star: Jane Lynch as herself Guest stars: Corey Fogelmanis as Farkle, Ava Kolker as Ava, Cecilia Balagot as Smackle, Reagan Pasternak as Judy Absent: Peyton Meyer as Lucas Friar
| 20 | 20 | "Girl Meets First Date" | Rider Strong | Susan Estelle Jansen | March 27, 2015 | 120 | 2.28 |
Cory embraces the idea of "first love" at the end of the school year, until he realizes Riley is among those experiencing it with Lucas. As Cory desperately tries to keep them apart, Lucas decides he wants to go about things right by asking Cory and Topanga for their blessing to date their daughter. Feeling that Riley is too young to be dating, Cory agrees to the date on the condition that it is a double date, with Maya and Farkle accompanying the two. Meanwhile, Auggie and Ava quickly get "engaged" and then "married", but Topanga escorts the "bride" out of the Matthews' apartment. Uncle Josh also pays a visit with plans to attend a pre-college program at NYU all summer. He takes an interest in a tour guide from the university, but being three years older than him, she turns him down. Maya understands what he is going through after experiencing same rejection from him. After Josh leaves the train that Riley, Maya, Farkle, and Lucas are going to their dates on, Riley sees how sad Maya is and Lucas notices too, telling Riley to go comfort her. After, Maya pushes Riley into Lucas' lap, paralleling the scene in the first episode. Also starring: Corey Fogelmanis as Farkle Guest stars: Ava Kolker as Ava, Uriah Shelton as Joshua Matthews, Samantha Boscarino as Sophie Miller

=== Special (2015) ===
- This episode aired between the first and second season as part of Disney Channel's "What the What" special event and is not classified as an episode from either season despite being filmed during season two.

| No. | Title | Directed by | Written by | Original release date | Prod. code | U.S. viewers (millions) |
|---|---|---|---|---|---|---|
| 21 | "Girl Meets Demolition" "Girl Meets What the What" | Joel Zwick | Jeff Menell | April 17, 2015 | 207 | 2.08 |
Riley and Maya want money to buy clothes, so they go to Demolition, an accessory store, to buy new outfits. The cashier, Aubrey, manipulates the two girls into giving away all their clothes. Riley sees a pretty dress and becomes obsessed over it, so she decides to use a $500 emergency credit card Topanga gave her to buy it, despite Maya's urging not to. The girls tell Cory what happened and demands to speak to Aubrey, but when he does, she brainwashes him into thinking he looks like Justin Timberlake and he ends up being scammed into buying an expensive outfit. Topanga gets irritated from the circumstance; Cory then tells Topanga they all spent $1,200 worth of clothes. Enraged, Topanga goes down to Demolition to tell the owners that Aubrey scammed her daughter and husband into buying extravagant items. The owners turn out to be Aubrey's parents, who are delighted that she scammed someone into giving her money. Later, Aubrey gets a phone call from Evelyn Rand saying she wants the dress Aubrey sold to Riley back for $2,500, but Aubrey insists on $4,000. Evelyn arrives and teaches Aubrey a valuable life lesson, causing Aubrey to turn over a new leaf. At the end of the episode, Aubrey goes up to the Matthews apartment, asking Riley and Maya to teach her how to be a better person. Special guest star: Debby Ryan as Aubrey Guest stars: Jackée as Evelyn Rand, Stephanie Erb as Hillary, David Starzyk as Ron Absent: Peyton Meyer as Lucas Friar, Corey Fogelmanis as Farkle Minkus Note: This episode is not considered a part of the first or second season, but instead a special episode that was a part of Disney Channel's "What the What Weekend". Additionally, Disney Channel calls the episode "Girl Meets What the What" to tie into the programming event, but the series' writers and other sources refer to it as "Girl Meets Demolition".

=== Season 2 (2015–16) ===
| No. overall | No. in season | Title | Directed by | Written by | Original release date | Prod. code | U.S. viewers (millions) |
|---|---|---|---|---|---|---|---|
| 22 | 1 | "Girl Meets Gravity" | Rider Strong | Randi Barnes | May 11, 2015 | 201 | 2.05 |
Riley, Maya, Lucas, and Farkle start their first day of the eighth grade at John Quincy Adams Middle School. After the girls startle their new teacher Mr. Martinez with their rudeness, he quits and Cory replaces him. Riley and Maya then decide to transfer classes, desiring to have a different teacher than Cory. They quickly discover that their new history teacher is very strict, and forces the girls to be separated against their wishes. They also notice that their new classmates are almost identical in both appearance and personalities to Riley, Maya, Farkle and Lucas. The girls later transfer back to Cory's classroom and restore normalcy. However, the girls are still restless, feeling like their parents are always "circling" around them like planets. Riley talks about the Sun, Earth and the Earth's orbit throughout the episode, and in the end, it is revealed Mrs. Svorski, the former owner of the bakery, has died and Riley was speaking at her funeral. Special guest stars: William Daniels as Mr. Feeny, Cloris Leachman as Mrs. Svorski Guest stars: Cheryl Texiera as Katy Hart, Delon de Metz as Mr. Martinez, Senta Moses as Alterna-Cory
| 23 | 2 | "Girl Meets the New World" | Joel Zwick | Teresa Kale | May 12, 2015 | 208 | 2.14 |
Maya begins to pressure Riley to find out what happened on her date with Lucas. Their classmates at school know that Riley and Lucas kissed, and begin pressuring the two to tell everyone if they are dating. Later on, Riley and Lucas confirm they are dating, telling Cory and Topanga about their kiss, which Cory is shocked about. Things become awkward, and even though Riley and Lucas have strong feelings for each other, they decide to break up and remain friends. Meanwhile, Maya and Farkle get "engaged" and then "married". Elsewhere, Topanga becomes frustrated while trying to teach Auggie's new friend that his name is Dewey, but he thinks his name is pronounced "Doy". Guest star: Cooper Friedman as Dewey
| 24 | 3 | "Girl Meets the Secret of Life" | Rider Strong & Shiloh Strong | Mark Blutman | May 13, 2015 | 202 | 2.60 |
One of Lucas's friends from Texas, Zay Babineaux, transfers to John Adams, and alludes to the fact that Lucas acted quite differently back in Texas. This causes Riley significant distress, and she begins to worry that Lucas may not be the right boyfriend for her. After discovering Lucas was expelled from his previous school, a parallel discussion begins in which Cory asks his students what the secret of life is. To further the conversation for the next class, Cory assigns the students to wash a car together and claims by doing so, they will find the secret of life. A disagreement regarding Lucas's personality in Texas starts after the friends begin spraying each other with water. After they finish washing the car, Zay runs into a bully and Lucas attempts to help his friend out as Riley and Maya watch. Lucas threatens the bully away, and reveals to Riley that the reason he was expelled is because his temper got the best of him when Zay was in trouble. Through Cory's lesson, the friends then realize that whatever Lucas's personality was before he came to New York does not matter, as they have all changed him for the better. Guest stars: Amir Mitchell-Townes as Zay Babineaux, Shak Ghacha as Joey Ricciardella
| 25 | 4 | "Girl Meets Pluto" | Joel Zwick | Matthew Nelson | May 14, 2015 | 203 | 2.36 |
Riley is shocked when Maya tells her that Pluto is no longer considered a planet. Cory asks his students how they think they will be remembered in history, and he suggests creating a class time capsule. Cory then remembers the time capsule that he, Topanga, and Shawn buried fifteen years ago in Philadelphia, causing him to elatedly go out and buy shovels so they can dig it up. Maya and Riley go to Philadelphia with Cory, Topanga, and Shawn to dig up the time capsule in Mr. Feeny's yard. Shawn reveals his contribution to the time capsule was the contents of his ex-girlfriend Angela's purse, causing Maya to believe that Shawn does not actually love her mother as she had hoped. Shawn reassures her, telling Maya that he will always be there for her if she needs it. Later, the friends fill their own time capsule with various things that signify importance to them, including Riley's pluto ball, Farkle's orange turtleneck and Lucas's transfer slip. Maya asks her friends to leave so she can put in her contribution, which is a picture of Shawn and her mother together with her on her 14th birthday. Special guest star: William Daniels as Mr. Feeny Guest stars: Rider Strong as Shawn Hunter, Cheryl Texiera as Katy Hart Absent: August Maturo as Auggie Matthews
| 26 | 5 | "Girl Meets Mr. Squirrels" | Rider Strong & Shiloh Strong | Michael Jacobs | May 15, 2015 | 204 | 2.20 |
Riley and Maya get into a huge argument which threatens their friendship. The feud prompts Cory to call on his older brother Eric to mediate, recalling his people skills in settling a feud when they were in college. After Eric arrives at the Matthews' apartment, he listens to the girls, and Maya reveals a comment Lucas made about her height, which Riley decided to agree with rather than considering how hurtful the comment was to her friend. Eric is later a guest in Cory's class, and he gathers the students just outside the classroom, where Riley and Maya further discuss their problem. It turns out the other students, including Farkle, Lucas and Zay, are dealing with similar issues for their age. Eric shows them that what they are going through is normal, and they should be supportive of each other even with these issues. Guest stars: Will Friedle as Eric Matthews, Amir Mitchell-Townes as Zay Babineaux
| 27 | 6 | "Girl Meets the Tell-Tale-Tot" | Ben Savage | Teresa Kale | June 5, 2015 | 205 | 2.19 |
Uncle Josh visits Cory and his family again, with great news about being accepted into NYU, to Maya's delight. There is a welcoming party for Josh at a friend's dormitory at the university, which Maya is determined to attend. It starts late at night, so Maya pretends to have a sleepover at Riley's with plans to sneak out. Though Riley knows it is wrong, she decides to accompany Maya, and the two devise a scheme so that Riley's parents are unaware that they are at this party. Auggie later unfoils the scheme, but keeps quiet. While Riley enjoys her first taste of college life, Maya regrets being there when she sees Josh speaking with other girls and realizes she is not in their league. Josh is startled to see Riley and Maya, and takes the two home after trying to set things straight regarding Maya's feelings for him. Riley ends up grounded for two weeks for sneaking out, and Auggie is grounded for one week, for not speaking up about his sister. Guest stars: Uriah Shelton as Joshua Matthews, Amir Mitchell-Townes as Zay Babineaux, Madison McLaughlin as Jasmine, Cynthy Wu as Charlotte, Tajh Bellow as Andrew Absent: Peyton Meyer as Lucas Friar Note: "Tell-Tale-Tot" is in reference to Edgar Allan Poe's story "The Tell-Tale Heart", which Cory teaches his class in this episode, with a large tater tot representing one's conscience.
| 28 | 7 | "Girl Meets Rules" | Rider Strong & Shiloh Strong | Randi Barnes | June 12, 2015 | 211 | 2.04 |
Cory gives his entire class detention. While Cory is out of the classroom, the class splits into two separate groups, one led by Riley and the other by Maya. Rileytown represents order and structure; the quieter students stay with Riley in the classroom. Maya's group, which represents chaos and rebellion, walks out. Lucas and Farkle follow the rebels and join Mayaville. Each group eventually realizes how much they need the other group to balance things, and Riley and Maya similarly discover how much they need each other. Guest stars: Danny McNulty as Harley Keiner, Ava Kolker as Ava Morgenstern
| 29 | 8 | "Girl Meets Hurricane" | William Russ | Matthew Nelson | June 19, 2015 | 209 | 2.07 |
After giving Maya "fatherly advice" about her needing to dress differently, Shawn buys her a whole new wardrobe of clothes, as a gift from both him and Katy. This gives Maya hope that her mother and Shawn will grow closer. Maya holds on to that hope even when Shawn's old girlfriend Angela pays a visit. As the two catch up on their past, Angela and Shawn realize what they had for each other has prepared them for what is happening in their lives right now. Angela, already married for four years to a military man, looks to Shawn for advice on starting a family and asks him whether she will be a good mother. She also notices Maya and Katy, and wants Shawn to pursue a relationship with Katy. Later, Katy asks Shawn out on a date, and after receiving further advice from his late father Chet who appears to him for the big moment, Shawn accepts. Guest stars: Rider Strong as Shawn Hunter, Cheryl Texiera as Katy Hart, Trina McGee as Angela Moore, Blake Clark as Chet Hunter
| 30 | 9 | "Girl Meets Mr. Squirrels Goes to Washington" | Rider Strong & Shiloh Strong | Mark Blutman | July 10, 2015 | 210 | 2.09 |
Cory's students argue that the election is not relevant to their generation because they are unable to vote or influence the events. Quickly after, Eric bursts into the classroom and announces he has been nominated to run for New York senator. Eric explains to the Matthews Family that a man came up to him and claimed he was the only person who could beat his opponent, Senator Graham, though he later discovers he was purposefully chosen by someone who works for his opponent to make Senator Graham look good. Eric decides to use his opponent's lack of empathy to his advantage, and bases his campaign speech on how he could make the election relevant to everyone, including children, rather than picking on the little guy. At the campaign speech, a man whom Eric met earlier at Topanga's reveals himself to be Tommy, a little boy that Eric fostered and considered adopting when he was in college. Due to his fantastic speech, Eric wins the election and attempts to become closer to Tommy once again. Guest stars: Will Friedle as Eric Matthews, Danny McNulty as Harley Keiner, Nicholas Hormann as Senator Graham, Lamont Thompson as Zachary T. Wolff, J.B. Gaynor as TJ Murphy Absent: August Maturo as Auggie Matthews
| 31 | 10 | "Girl Meets the New Teacher" | Joel Zwick | Michael Jacobs | July 17, 2015 | 212 | 2.37 |
When Riley's English teacher retires, a new teacher named Harper Burgess takes his place. She has an unconventional teaching style that inspires the students, especially Maya, but soon gets in trouble with Principal Yancy for using The Dark Knight Returns by Frank Miller as subject matter. When Cory stands up to defend this new teacher, his job is placed in jeopardy as well. Superintendent Jonathan Turner is called in to see if she is worthy of being kept as a teacher. He mentions that he taught X-Men to his class, and in regard to To Kill a Mockingbird, mentions that her dad named her Harper Lee Burgess, after the author of the novel. Harper Burgess is kept on as a teacher at John Quincy Adams Middle School, and continues to use her unconventional teaching style to inspire students. Guest stars: Anthony Tyler Quinn as Mr. Turner, Tania Gunadi as Harper Burgess, Stuart Pankin as Principal Yancy
| 32 | 11 | "Girl Meets Fish" | Michael A. Joseph | David J. Jacobs & Michael Jacobs | July 24, 2015 | 121 | 2.19 |
When it is Riley's turn to take care of the class fish, she discovers it is dead. Auggie suspects foul play and investigates the matter. As Riley and Maya pay a visit to Phil's fish store for a replacement, the rest of the class is gathered at Riley's apartment for questioning. Farkle, the last to care for the fish, is the first in the hot seat and admits to replacing the fish several times, due to each one dying in separate mishaps. Maya and Lucas are then questioned, only to discover they too replaced the fish multiple times on their watch. In fact, each of the students replaced the fish during their turns to care for it. As for the fish Riley was to look after, it is revealed Auggie fed graham crackers to the fish right before it was handed to Riley, causing it to die. Though the case is solved, Auggie feels awful that he killed the fish, but Riley forgives him and allows him to care for its replacement. The entire class then visits Phil's fish store for a new class fish, and they hope it will live a long life with proper care. Also starring: Corey Fogelmanis as Farkle Guest stars: Ava Kolker as Ava, Hugh Dane as Phil Note: This episode was filmed during the first season, but was held back and later aired during the second season for Disney Channel's "Whodunit?" special event. Corey Fogelmanis is credited as "also starring" after the episode's opening sequence.
| 33 | 12 | "Girl Meets Yearbook" | Rider Strong & Shiloh Strong | Teresa Kale | August 7, 2015 | 214 | 2.33 |
When Riley and Farkle dislike what their school yearbook says about them, they decide to change their personalities because they believe students are making fun of their quirkiness. Farkle, who is unique enough to have his own category in the yearbook, transforms into a regular guy named Donnie Barnes. Riley becomes increasingly uncomfortable when she is voted the person who would be "most likely to smile themselves to death." It is also learned that the entirety of their class views Maya and Lucas as boyfriend and girlfriend, despite the two being completely unaware of where the idea came from. Unable to deal with how other people view her, Riley assumes a morose alter-ego named Morosha M. Black. Riley's change deeply affects Maya, who in turn seeks to become her best friend and emulate her. Lucas is not pleased about these changes in his friends, who are letting what others say affect them, and he wants them to be themselves again. Cory's history lesson about Iceland and Greenland, and how people settled in Greenland because of its name, then perished, serves as a reminder to the class not to be misguided by what others say. Guest star: Cheryl Texiera as Katy Hart Absent: August Maturo as Auggie Matthews
| 34 | 13 | "Girl Meets Semi-Formal" | Joel Zwick | Will Friedle | August 14, 2015 | 216 | 2.20 |
Riley is forced to examine her relationship with Lucas when another boy named Charlie Gardner asks her to a big semi-formal dance. Charlie asks Riley on a date and seems like the perfect date to Riley, but Lucas assumes he and Riley were going together. Meanwhile, newly elected Senator Eric reunites with his old friend Jack Hunter when he comes to Eric, on behalf of a large corporation that wants to build a pipeline. Eric recognizes that Jack has lost his way, and tries to save his friend by showing him a simpler way of life, which leads to him meeting Riley at the semi-formal dance. Maya and Lucas dance together and share an awkward moment when Lucas denies that they are dancing, fumbling over his words, which Maya questions. Riley dances with Farkle and Charlie while still confused of her true feelings. Special guest star: Sheppard as themselves Guest stars: Will Friedle as Eric Matthews, Matthew Lawrence as Jack Hunter, Tanner Buchanan as Charlie Gardner, Phil Morris as Agent LaChance Absent: August Maturo as Auggie Matthews
| 35 | 14 | "Girl Meets Creativity" | Rider Strong & Shiloh Strong | Matthew Nelson | August 21, 2015 | 218 | 2.26 |
The group learns that the school's art programs are being canceled due to budget cuts, and Lucas inspires the group to try and save art class, which Maya is passionate about. Though Maya is skeptical to step up against authority, she is eventually convinced with Riley's help to fight for what she believes in. With Cory's assistance, the girls reach out to Superintendent Turner, who says that he is not in favor of cutting arts either, but claims the school's budget is very limited. Still not satisfied with Turner's answer, Maya and her friends go to the school board meeting and show the board members how taking away the arts actually will affect students. After a creative demonstration by the five friends, the school board agrees to think differently about how important the arts are, while also making the promise that they will work out the budget cuts without cutting any art programs. Guest stars: Diana Maria Riva as Chairperson Sanchez, Anthony Tyler Quinn as Mr. Turner, Amir Mitchell-Townes as Zay Babineaux, Aisha Kabia as Ms. Kossal
| 36 | 15 | "Girl Meets Farkle" "Girl Meets I Am Farkle" | Willie Garson | Mark Blutman | September 11, 2015 | 217 | 1.85 |
Results of a school IQ test show Farkle to be a genius, and the Minkuses hold a party for their son at Topanga's. Isadora Smackle comes to the party and invites Farkle to transfer to Einstein Academy. Later, additional tests identify that Farkle may have Asperger's syndrome, a form of autism. Though in disbelief at first, Riley, Maya and Lucas help their friend understand the symptoms, one of which is a difficulty understanding love. Farkle tries to explore that by hanging out with Smackle, who shows compassion when he tells her he may have Asperger's. Smackle later decides to observe Farkle in Cory's class, and after Farkle confirms he does not have Asperger's, she feels uncomfortable but realizes he belongs around his friends rather than at Einstein Academy. Seeing how Smackle interacts with everyone, including how she feels being hugged, Riley and Maya deduce she has Asperger's, and Smackle tells them she was diagnosed with it at the age of five. Farkle shows the same compassion Smackle showed him after discovering this. Guest stars: Lee Norris as Minkus, Kristanna Loken as Jennifer Bassett Minkus, Cecilia Balagot as Smackle, Cyrina Fiallo as Ms. Oben Absent: August Maturo as Auggie Matthews
| 37 | 16 | "Girl Meets Cory and Topanga" | Ben Savage | Joshua Jacobs | September 18, 2015 | 220 | 2.42 |
Riley wonders how she will positively impact the world, and feels she will never be as "perfect" as her parents. In exploring this question, she and Maya talk to a nun at an orphanage and a clown at the circus, but Riley is reminded about being in her parents' shadow when she sees them contributing at those places. Maya suggests Riley tell some stories she remembers about her parents' young days, and the two see Cory and Topanga at their age. As Riley sees a little of both of her parents in her, and their quirks, she is reminded by the younger Topanga that she is unique. Guest stars: Ken Hudson Campbell as Jingles the Clown, Diona Reasonover as Sister Mary Beth
| 38 | 17 | "Girl Meets Rileytown" | Michael A. Joseph | Lauren Otero | September 25, 2015 | 223 | 2.62 |
Maya describes Riley's place of uniqueness as "Rileytown", but mere mention of that word causes Riley to become irate and call Maya a "bully". At the same time, the two girls and the rest of Cory's class learn how to resolve conflicts. With the Aaron Burr-Alexander Hamilton conflict as the class example, Riley decides to challenge Maya to a duel, and they carry it out at Topanga's, using ice cream as their weaponry. After Maya backs out, Riley ice-creams her. Maya becomes aware that something is wrong with Riley, and Farkle, recalling when he was bullied, thinks someone is bullying Riley. Maya talks to Riley and wants her to open up about what is going on. Riley explains that she is being bullied by someone sending her threatening text messages, and that the term "Rileytown" caused her to feel different and humiliated, causing her to take it out on Maya. Farkle, Lucas, and Zay come to talk to her as well, saying she can come to them if something is bothering her, which is further discussed in her father's class. The bully has been taking videos of Riley at school which include Riley giving herself "award ceremonies" every Friday, and threatens to send the rest of the school those videos. To confront her unseen bully, Riley shows she is not ashamed of her quirky personality by performing one of her award ceremonies in front of the whole school. The unseen bully realizes that she can no longer damage Riley's confidence and runs away. Guest star: Amir Mitchell-Townes as Zay Babineaux Absent: August Maturo as Auggie Matthews
| 39 | 18 | "Girl Meets World of Terror 2" | Joel Zwick | Jeff Menell | October 2, 2015 | 215 | 2.38 |
Auggie, along with Doy and Ava, narrates the "Second Annual Scary Time Theater" which highlights three separate Halloween tales. In the first segment, Riley and Maya both dress up as flapper girls per the suggestion of a ghost whom resides in the bay window. The ghost explains to Riley and Maya that she remains in the bay window because it used to be hers, and she wants the subsequent owners to enjoy the space as much as she did. Riley and Maya struggle to get the ghost out of the bay window, until the ghost mispronounces Doy's name and he lets out an ear-piercing scream, causing the ghost to leave the window. In the second segment, Riley and Maya inadvertently find the ghost again in a haunted house, and attempt to help her friend, Tessie, become friendly again. The girls are unable to help Tessie and run away in terror. Finally, Riley and Maya believe that Doy has turned them into cartoon characters, though they later discover it the ghost once again, using her magic to influence them. After one last time of watching the girls, the ghost finally decides that it is time to move on, because the girls appreciate the bay window's true power. Special guest stars: Ross Lynch as Austin Moon, Laura Marano as Ally Dawson Guest stars: Ava Kolker as Ava Morgenstern, Cooper Friedman as Doy, Brittany Ross as Ghost Absent: Peyton Meyer as Lucas Friar, Corey Fogelmanis as Farkle Minkus
| 40 | 19 | "Girl Meets Rah Rah" | Joel Zwick | Randi Barnes | October 9, 2015 | 222 | 3.31 |
After years of failing to make the cheerleading squad, Riley is determined to get on the squad this time, but Coach Kelly shows little faith in her and expects her to quit. Maya, Lucas, Farkle, and Zay attend the tryouts to support her, though even they have their doubts of her succeeding. Riley manages to get through the three days of tryouts, even with the mistakes and injuries, but when she is finally cut, she is faced with deciding whether to give up on cheerleading. While Cory worries about his daughter's desire to become a cheerleader, as her teacher, he encourages her to continue pursuing something she is passionate about. Despite Coach Kelly not placing her on the squad initially, Riley's spirit and persistence pay off. Guest stars: Perez Hilton as himself, Amir Mitchell-Townes as Zay Babineaux, Jennifer Hasty as Coach Kelly, Courtney Schwartz as Samantha, Savannah Winters as Jenkins, Jacqueline A. Benoit as Nurse
| 41 | 20 | "Girl Meets Texas: Part 1" | Rider Strong & Shiloh Strong | Michael Jacobs & Matthew Nelson | October 16, 2015 | 224 | 2.94 |
Riley and Maya learn that Lucas failed a sheep-riding contest years ago and mistakenly enter him in a bull-riding contest in Texas. When it is revealed how dangerous the event is, Riley tries to convince Lucas to go through with it. However, Maya is completely opposed to the idea and begs him not to participate. This results in Riley realizing Maya's true feelings for Lucas. Guest stars: M.C. Gainey as Pappy Joe, Amir Mitchell-Townes as Zay Babineaux, Tahmus Rounds as Cletis, Madison Mason as McCullough Absent: August Maturo as Auggie Matthews, Danielle Fishel as Topanga Matthews
| 42 | 21 | "Girl Meets Texas: Part 2" | Rider Strong & Shiloh Strong | Matthew Nelson & Michael Jacobs | October 17, 2015 | 225 | 2.88 |
The group spends their first night out in Texas. Zay reunites with his old flame, Vanessa, thanks to Riley and Maya. Meanwhile, Riley begins to understand that Maya had stepped back for the sake of their friendship, and Riley tells Lucas about Maya's feelings. Lucas pressures Maya to say whether she likes him or not. She denies it, but as she does, Lucas surprises her by trying to kiss her, causing tension and confusion between the two about their true feelings for each other. Special guest stars: Maddie & Tae as themselves Guest stars: M.C. Gainey as Pappy Joe, Amir Mitchell-Townes as Zay Babineaux, Chandler Kinney as Vanessa Absent: Ben Savage as Cory Matthews, August Maturo as Auggie Matthews, Danielle Fishel as Topanga Matthews
| 43 | 22 | "Girl Meets Texas: Part 3" | Ben Savage | Michael Jacobs & Matthew Nelson | October 18, 2015 | 227 | 3.12 |
Riley has convinced herself that she and Lucas are like brother and sister, in order to give Maya a chance to understand how she really feels about him. Now, Maya and Lucas cannot communicate, mirroring Riley and Lucas' awkwardness when they were dating. Whilst Maya and Lucas are finding it difficult to take a step forward in their relationship until Maya resumes her teasing behavior, which makes Lucas happy. Riley is pursued by Charlie Gardner and she agrees to date him. In the end, Farkle helps Riley realize she still likes Lucas, and they share a long conversation at Topanga's which results in a hug. Guest stars: Amir Mitchell-Townes as Zay Babineaux, Tanner Buchanan as Charlie Gardner
| 44 | 23 | "Girl Meets the Forgiveness Project" | Joel Zwick | Matthew Nelson | November 6, 2015 | 221 | 2.51 |
When Cory comes up with the idea of a forgiveness project, everyone expresses their feelings on paper to someone they wish to forgive. Riley writes to Auggie and Lucas and Zay write to Farkle, while Maya decides to write to her father, Kermit, who appears at Topanga's after receiving Maya's letter. That comes as a shock to Katy, but Maya wants to give Kermit a chance to be part of her life again after he failed to be for the last nine years. As Maya and the rest of Cory's class miss the point of forgiveness, Cory explains to them that they need to give those they are forgiving an opportunity to show remorse for their wrongdoing before the assignment can even begin. Riley, Lucas, and Zay have little difficulty in forgiving, while Maya's situation is a different story. Kermit explains to her why he left her and her mother and started a different family. Maya understands what her father did and is no longer angry with him, but she cannot forgive him. She tearfully confesses to Cory she failed the assignment, but Cory says he did not expect her to reconcile with her father right away, if ever. Guest stars: Amir Mitchell-Townes as Zay Babineaux, Cheryl Texiera as Katy Hart, David Thomas Jenkins as Kermit, Carlos Antonio as Howie
| 45 | 24 | "Girl Meets Belief" | Joel Zwick | Jeff Menell | November 13, 2015 | 213 | 2.15 |
After Maya finds money just outside Cory's classroom, she wants to buy ice cream with it, but Riley tells her it is not her money. As they go into class, Cory has the class look at each other's beliefs; he assigns Riley and Maya to report about Thomas Jefferson, and Lucas and Farkle to report about Joan of Arc. The assignment creates tension among the four because of their differing beliefs, causing them to switch partners. Maya takes a brief break from Riley, because Riley pressures her to believe in something. While the four continue to work on the assignment and discuss their beliefs in Riley's bedroom, Cory gives them insight about why their beliefs are different, and tells them listening to others helps to form their beliefs. What the four learn about Jefferson and Joan of Arc also influences what they believe. Farkle realizes some things are not scientifically explained, such as his friendships for which he is grateful. Maya tries praying after discovering Riley believes in God, and gives back the money she found earlier. Riley and Lucas question why they need each other, since they are not challenged or learning from each other. Meanwhile, Auggie prays Mrs. Svorski is not alone in heaven by talking to her.
| 46 | 25 | "Girl Meets the New Year" | Joel Zwick | Mark Blutman | December 4, 2015 | 229 | 2.07 |
When Harper teaches about Jane Austen's Sense and Sensibility in English class, Riley and Maya soon realize their similarities to the novel's two main characters. Having seen the movie adaptation, Charlie shares with the class that a relationship must have both sense and sensibility to work. Riley is inspired by the novel to host a New Year's Eve party for all of her friends from school. Meanwhile, Farkle continues to be frustrated with Riley for not telling Lucas how she truly feels about him; Farkle gives her until midnight on New Year's Eve to do so, or he will. During his class, Cory teaches the importance of friendship and growth, and how without proper care, feelings can ruin them. At the party, Charlie and the group play a couples game, in which Maya and Lucas are partners. Riley, Maya, and Lucas become uncomfortable as the game progresses. Riley ends the game on her turn and brings everyone up to the roof, minutes before the new year begins. On the rooftop, Riley asks Farkle for more time to confess her true feelings, but he refuses as he does not want lies to cause further damage. Wanting to be with Riley at midnight, Charlie tries to show he cares about her. Riley tells him while that makes sense, a good relationship needs to have sensibility as well, leaving the two alone on separate sides of the roof. Maya, still confused about her feelings, tells Lucas that she wants to start off the new year being nice to him and that she is glad they will be together at midnight. He grins and says that makes up for everything. When the clock strikes midnight, Riley tries to escape just as Farkle yells out the truth, causing Maya and Lucas to be dismayed by the revelation. Everyone leaves except for Riley, Maya, and Lucas. The three sit alone on a bench, confused. Guest stars: Tania Gunadi as Harper Burgess, Tanner Buchanan as Charlie Gardner, Cecilia Balagot as Smackle
| 47 | 26 | "Girl Meets STEM" | Rider Strong & Shiloh Strong | Teresa Kale | January 8, 2016 | 219 | 1.62 |
For the mid-term science experiment, Mr. Norton has Riley and her classmates examine a solution by placing a mystery marble into clear liquid, with one person of each boy-girl team dropping the marble and the other working out the scientific calculations. When Riley sees it is only the girls who are putting the marbles into the liquid and leaving the boys to do the science, she is offended and refuses to follow that trend. She gathers the girls into her bedroom to discuss why this is happening, and makes them realize they are not seeing their potential. She also confronts Farkle, her science experiment partner, about his perceived stereotyping of girls; he takes the blame and apologizes to Riley for not allowing her to pursue her interest in science. While the marble-liquid solution is simply sludge, there is a bigger picture to the experiment which Riley has already figured out. She presents her finding to Mr. Norton, who informs the class it is at their age that girls begin to lose interest in the STEM subjects. The rest of the class cannot see their partners due to the beaker of sludge in their way, but Riley and Farkle can see each other crystal clear, because they worked together equally to complete the science. Guest stars: Ava Kolker as Ava Morgenstern, Amir Mitchell-Townes as Zay Babineaux, Jeff Doucette as Mr. Norton
| 48 | 27 | "Girl Meets Money" | Rider Strong & Shiloh Strong | Teleplay by : Jeff Menell; Story by : Aaron Jacobs & Jeff Menell | January 22, 2016 | 226 | 2.20 |
As Cory teaches his class about the value of money, and Stuart makes a risky investment on new technology for Minkus International, Farkle becomes concerned about being poor. He quickly starts seeing there is greater value to his friendships and family than money and material things can give. Cory goes further into his money lesson by emphasizing there is a large part of the world that is less fortunate, revealing a greater "secret of life": kindness and charity toward others. Cory challenges the class to come up with ideas for using money to help those in need, but this prompts Farkle to leave class immediately and to talk to his father about their relationship and his company's purpose, saying he needs to do more for the rest of the world. Because of the heartfelt conversation, Stuart begins a charitable organization and looks to give away money for a charitable cause. With help from NBA owner Mark Cuban, Stuart, Cory and Topanga listen to Riley, Lucas, Maya and Farkle about how they would help the less fortunate. Ultimately, on Farkle's request, Stuart and Mark invest on Maya, who lives in need and appreciates all she has been given. Meanwhile, Auggie worries about his father when he does not receive his whole allowance, but learns the importance of Cory's contributions as a teacher, despite being paid less than Topanga. Guest stars: Mark Cuban as Mark Cuban, Lee Norris as Minkus
| 49 | 28 | "Girl Meets Commonism" | Danielle Fishel | Joshua Jacobs & Michael Jacobs | February 12, 2016 | 206 | 1.75 |
Riley and Lucas are two members on the school honor board, which is to decide a case involving Maya and Farkle. Riley, who finds out Maya cheated off Farkle on a test, wants them off the hook for the sake of their friendship, but Lucas disagrees, as does Cory, who oversees the honor board. When Cory's class learns about communism, Riley defends Maya's cheating as a form of sharing and feels there is nothing wrong with what she did. The girls and Farkle start embracing the ideals of communism, and disregard their individuality. As Maya and Farkle's fate is being determined by the honor board, Riley sides with them, and Topanga represents them, but it is revealed that Farkle was not the only one helping Maya to cheat, but Riley as well. After Cory hands back a test where everyone has received excellent scores, but Riley, Maya and Farkle end up with an "average" grade, the three realize the importance of being individuals. Meanwhile, Auggie is wondering what to do with his life, but things backfire when he decides to be a lawyer and defend Frankie, the class bully. Guest stars: Amir Mitchell-Townes as Zay Babineaux, Ava Kolker as Ava Morgenstern, Michelle Page as Mrs. Ducksberry, Sanai Victoria as Emma Weathersby
| 50 | 29 | "Girl Meets the Bay Window" | Ben Savage | Joshua Jacobs | February 19, 2016 | 228 | 1.70 |
With high school around the corner, Riley decides to change her bedroom bay window and leave her childhood years behind, but Maya objects because of what the bay window has meant to both of them. She also feels reluctant to move on to this next phase of their lives. The girls reflect on when they first became friends, as well as when they first met Farkle, and the two talk to their younger selves about how much they have changed since. In the redecorated bay window, Riley and Maya see themselves as young adults preparing to move away, leaving the bay window behind as both the young and current versions of Riley and Maya watch. Guest stars: Mariah Buzolin as Adult Riley, Ruby Lewis as Adult Maya, Lindsey Lamer as Young Riley, Ivy George as Young Maya, Michael Wilder as Young Farkle Absent: August Maturo as Auggie Matthews
| 51 | 30 | "Girl Meets Legacy" | Joel Zwick | Randi Barnes | March 11, 2016 | 230 | 1.70 |
Riley and Maya have not discussed their feelings for Lucas since the new year, so he decides to simply stay friends with them for the sake of not hurting either girl. As Cory teaches his class one last time, the group feels that Cory has not given them enough instruction to move forward to high school. Cory admits to being wrong about not allowing them to feel as a natural part of their changing, but sees how much his class has learned while in middle school. For the final lesson, he challenges them to leave a lasting mark for future John Quincy Adams students to remember them by, prompting them to dedicate a new bench in the school hallway. As they graduate and leave middle school behind, they decide for their class prank to steal their school mascot, which shocks Cory. It turns out it is Cory. Through Riley's call to Superintendent Turner and a heavily-supported petition, Cory is allowed to transfer schools so he can continue to teach Riley and her friends in high school. Guest stars: Amir Mitchell-Townes as Zay Babineaux, Lee Norris as Minkus, Cheryl Texiera as Katy Hart, Danny McNulty as Harley Keiner, Jeff Doucette as Mr. Norton, Aisha Kabia as Ms. Kossal

=== Season 3 (2016–17) ===
| No. overall | No. in season | Title | Directed by | Written by | Original release date | Prod. code | U.S. viewers (millions) |
|---|---|---|---|---|---|---|---|
| 52 | 1 | "Girl Meets High School: Part One" | Joel Zwick | Michael Jacobs | June 3, 2016 | 301 | 1.89 |
The first day at Abigail Adams High School is a new adventure for Riley, Maya, Lucas, Farkle, Zay, and Smackle. The six quickly learn they are no longer leaders, as three seniors—Thor, Francesca, and Nikki—confine them to a small section of the school known as the "hole". Although Riley believes the seniors are teaching them a lesson and puts her faith in them, the group feels unimportant in their new school, unable to navigate through it without the older students in their way. Cory, also struggling with his first day in high school as a teacher, informs the group that they are in a bigger world now, but teaches them they need to stick together in exploring it. Unfortunately, a frustrated Lucas gets upset with Riley over where her loyalties stand and he, Farkle, Zay and Smackle decide to go their own way without Riley or Maya. Meanwhile, Ava worries about her parents fighting and needs comforting from Cory, Topanga, and Auggie after her father leaves. Guest stars: Amir Mitchell-Townes as Zay Babineaux, Cecilia Balagot as Smackle, Ava Kolker as Ava Morgenstern, Luke Benward as Thor, Claudia Lee as Francesca, Ashley Argota as Nikki, Katie Sarife as Marly, Gianna Lepera as Sofia
| 53 | 2 | "Girl Meets High School: Part Two" | Joel Zwick | Matthew Nelson | June 5, 2016 | 302 | 2.23 |
After Lucas and Zay try out for the football team, and Farkle and Smackle seek admission into the intellects club, they realize they are not as strong or smart as the rest of them. The four realize even more they abandoned Riley and Maya for their first days of high school. Riley and Maya discover the real reason Thor, Francesca and Nikki put them and their friends in the "hole": for the sake of their friendship, so they would not go through the same thing as Thor, Francesca and Nikki's group of friends when beginning high school. Cory teaches his class about how the patriots stuck together for worthy causes like protecting their land, even if massacre was the end result, and the group takes it to heart. Lucas, Farkle, Zay and Smackle make up with Riley and Maya, and they all vow to stick together through the challenges of high school. Meanwhile, Auggie helps Ava deal with her parents' splitting up by introducing her to his imaginary friend, but Ava begins to value her real friendship with Auggie. Guest stars: Billy Gardell as Coach Bobby Campagnola, Amir Mitchell-Townes as Zay Babineaux, Cecilia Balagot as Smackle, Ava Kolker as Ava Morgenstern, Luke Benward as Thor, Claudia Lee as Francesca, Ashley Argota as Nikki, Katie Sarife as Marly
| 54 | 3 | "Girl Meets Jexica" | Rider Strong & Shiloh Strong | Mackenzie Yeager | June 10, 2016 | 303 | 1.53 |
Riley is afraid what other students will think about her when she joins the Abigail Adams High School social network with her friends. She develops an alter ego by creating a profile with the name Jexica, who shares all of Riley's interests and later becomes massively popular at school. After Lucas asks Jexica to become part of his group of friends, Riley comes to school dressed as Jexica but sees many other students dressed as her, too. Jexica's popularity subsequently tumbles, and Riley finds out that Lucas actually knew she was Jexica all the time. In the end, Riley learns she should not be afraid to express herself on the Internet, regardless of what other people might think; it only matters what her friends think because they are the ones who really care about her. Meanwhile, Auggie receives an e-mail from a "prince" claiming to be his friend and offering him a large sum of money, which leads Cory and Topanga to talk to him about trusting people on the Internet. When Auggie later receives an e-mail from Ava who is in London and needs money, he feels he needs to help because they are friends. Guest stars: Amir Mitchell-Townes as Zay Babineaux, Ava Kolker as Ava Morgenstern, Emily Robinson as Amy
| 55 | 4 | "Girl Meets Permanent Record" | Rider Strong & Shiloh Strong | Teresa Kale | June 17, 2016 | 304 | 1.63 |
Riley receives a D on her first test in Spanish class, while Maya earns an A and is proud of her rare accomplishment. When Riley hears that a permanent record is kept beginning in high school and how she performed in middle school does not matter, she worries about the impact of her low grade on her future. Cory and Topanga have always known Riley to be a good student, but after talking to her Spanish teacher, Señora Feinstein-Chang, they realize Riley is presented with a new challenge and needs to work on becoming better. Señora Feinstein-Chang assures Riley the D is only one grade and what she does on her next test matters more toward gauging her progress, as does all of her past work, her true "permanent record". After she studies extensively, and demonstrates to Señora Feinstein-Chang in class that she can speak Spanish better, Riley earns an A− on the next Spanish test. Guest stars: Amir Mitchell-Townes as Zay Babineaux, Cecilia Balagot as Smackle, Anahi Bustillos as Señora Feinstein-Chang
| 56 | 5 | "Girl Meets Triangle" | Ben Savage | Joshua Jacobs | June 24, 2016 | 305 | 2.13 |
When Riley and Maya see other girls in school going through their break-up phase, they meet Sage, with whom they share that they like the same boy. Sage tells them they need to make a decision about him, and Farkle and Zay similarly tell Lucas he needs to choose between Riley and Maya. Meanwhile, Maya struggles with her first painting for her new art teacher, Mr. Jackson, as he questions her about what her work is saying, what influences are behind it, and more importantly, who she is. Riley also wonders since she is no longer seeing the rebellious side of her best friend. Maya denies that she has changed, but after Mr. Jackson shows Maya her painting from a different perspective, she realizes how much Riley and her parents have influenced her. As she has become more like Riley, Maya is in need of finding her true self and asks Riley for help, so they go out in search of that. Around the same time, Lucas comes to the Matthews' apartment ready to reveal his decision about Riley and Maya to them, only to discover they are not there, so Cory, Topanga, and Katy urge him to share this news. Guest stars: Amir Mitchell-Townes as Zay Babineaux, Cheryl Texiera as Katy Hart, Aaron Lazar as Mr. Jackson, Diamond White as Sage Absent: August Maturo as Auggie Matthews
| 57 | 6 | "Girl Meets Upstate" | Joel Zwick | Mark Blutman | July 8, 2016 | 306 | 1.73 |
Riley and Maya visit Shawn at his place in upstate New York. When he hears that Maya has lost a part of herself due to Riley's influence, Shawn tells the girls how he was similarly affected by Cory, and like Maya, he wants to find his edgy side again. Knowing the girls are with Shawn, Cory comes for a visit as well and sees Shawn is angry at him for changing him too much. Cory reminds Shawn about his quality of "reckless spontaneity" to help him through his crisis. This also helps Riley to find Maya, as they head back to the city, to their art classroom at school, where Maya expresses her anger at Riley through a painting. It escalates into a paint fight, which Mr. Jackson walks in on; he notices Maya's painting and sees a greater artistic voice in her. Meanwhile, Lucas remains quiet about his choice of Riley or Maya and sits in Riley's bay window until the girls return, but when he finds out Maya has not been herself lately, the three decide to wait until they know who they are first. Shawn, on the other hand, having rediscovered himself, proposes to Katy, and she accepts. Guest stars: Rider Strong as Shawn Hunter, Amir Mitchell-Townes as Zay Babineaux, Cheryl Texiera as Katy Hart, Aaron Lazar as Mr. Jackson Absent: August Maturo as Auggie Matthews
| 58 | 7 | "Girl Meets True Maya" | Danielle Fishel | Matthew Nelson | July 15, 2016 | 307 | 1.82 |
Riley is hoping for Maya's rebellious side to return when Maya reveals she is about to do something big and bad. When the fire alarm goes off at school and money goes missing at Topanga's, though, the group is surprised Maya is not behind those. Maya is still learning what she has become and visits a park she went to when she was younger, bringing with her a hammer, a brick and some paint. At the park, she confronts two girls from her past, Carla and Renee, who are anticipating to see her vandalize the park, but they do not see the same Maya they knew before. Still, Maya gets caught by Officer James, who brings her back to the Matthews' apartment and charges her with vandalism. When he shows the group what she did, it becomes clearer that Riley has changed Maya for the better, and Officer James is willing to let the matter go as long as Maya does not get into trouble again. Guest stars: Cheryl Texiera as Katy Hart, Cooper Friedman as Doy, Reginald VelJohnson as Officer James, Mia Xitlali as Carla, Kylee Russell as Renee
| 59 | 8 | "Girl Meets Ski Lodge Part 1" | Rider Strong & Shiloh Strong | Teresa Kale | July 22, 2016 | 312 | 2.20 |
Cory takes his class on a field trip to Mount Sun Lodge to experience nature. Riley is aware of her father's past there and knows why he avoids anything about skiing, but Cory, who is running the nature club at the lodge, hopes history will not repeat. He is chaperoning the trip with his brother Josh, to Maya's delight, and Topanga. As soon as the group arrives, Riley hurts her foot after falling off the bus, which causes her to miss the hiking trip, but she is content to sit by a bay window at the lodge. As she witnesses the changing season through an autumn leaf that falls on her lap, and after she has given Maya time to find herself, Riley wants the love triangle involving her, Maya and Lucas resolved. The girls imagine their lives with Lucas, with both scenarios playing out to catastrophic endings as the girl left out affects the other's relationship. The three realize it will continue to take time to make this huge decision. Meanwhile, a young male employee arrives in the lodge and sees Riley at the window. The two begin to talk, including what they see outside. Guest stars: Amir Mitchell-Townes as Zay Babineaux, Cecilia Balagot as Smackle, Uriah Shelton as Joshua Matthews, Curran Walters as Evan
| 60 | 9 | "Girl Meets Ski Lodge Part 2" | Rider Strong & Shiloh Strong | Aaron Jacobs | July 29, 2016 | 313 | 1.78 |
As a new day begins at Mount Sun Lodge, Riley is in shock after staying awake all night talking to Evan, the young employee who saw her sitting by the window and tells her he wants to be a Sherpa someday. After everyone becomes aware of Evan, an insecure Lucas finds himself sorting through his feelings for both Riley and Maya, while Riley gains more insight about why Maya became more like her. Evan has the group participate in a game using a book Cory remembers from his high school trip to the ski lodge. Evan's question, a different one from what Cory faced, has the group exploring what makes a meaningful relationship. Soon afterward, Maya engages in a serious conversation with Josh, where her true feelings for him—and for Lucas—come out. Josh confesses that he is willing to wait and see what happens with him and Maya. She then talks to Lucas and wants him to tell Riley that he loves her. Lucas does and reveals that he has indeed chosen Riley, while she tells Lucas he has always been her choice. As the ski lodge trip ends, Evan has a friendly greeting from his mother for Cory, which does not please Topanga. Meanwhile, back home, Riley considers Maya her "extraordinary relationship", because Maya protected her from Lucas until knowing he was the right one for her. Guest stars: Amir Mitchell-Townes as Zay Babineaux, Cecilia Balagot as Smackle, Uriah Shelton as Joshua Matthews, Curran Walters as Evan Absent: August Maturo as Auggie Matthews
| 61 | 10 | "Girl Meets I Do" | Ben Savage | Mark Blutman | August 12, 2016 | 311 | 2.06 |
With Shawn and Katy's wedding approaching, Maya becomes anxious over whether they should be getting married. Her insecurities stem from her father leaving, especially the effect it had on her mother, and she does not want her mother to go through that same experience again with Shawn. She challenges Shawn to prove beyond words that he is ready to be with her mother and nothing will go wrong with their marriage. While Shawn cannot guarantee that their marriage will be perfect, he and Katy are willing to take the leap of faith by believing they are right for each other. As the two exchange their vows on the rooftop above the Matthews' apartment, Maya is willing to do the same. Special guest star: William Daniels as Mr. Feeny Guest stars: Rider Strong as Shawn Hunter, Ava Kolker as Ava Morgenstern, Cheryl Texiera as Katy Hart Absent: Peyton Meyer as Lucas Friar, Corey Fogelmanis as Farkle Minkus
| 62 | 11 | "Girl Meets Sassy Haltertop" "Girl Meets the Real World" | Ben Savage | Joshua Jacobs | August 19, 2016 | 309 | 1.56 |
Cory has his class explore whether people are naturally good or evil, but only Riley is given the assignment of debating the question from the evil point of view. Because of Riley's optimistic and innocent view of the world, and her inability to see how people could possibly be evil, Maya helps her with the assignment by showing her the world's problems in the news. It helps Riley prepare for her debate, but in delving into her evil side, she takes it too far when she impulsively eats Zay's cookie and is in no hurry to apologize for her action. Meanwhile, after hearing about the condition of New York's beaches from Riley and Maya, Auggie decides he wants to clean up the beach and Topanga takes him. Auggie realizes he cannot do the whole task alone but is assured he is making a difference by doing his part. Riley, too, realizes she is making a difference by doing good in the world despite being more in touch with her evil side for the class debate. She apologizes to Zay for what she did and helps a friend, Two Shoes Louie, toward his cause. Guest stars: Amir Mitchell-Townes as Zay Babineaux, Cecilia Balagot as Smackle, Justin Dray as Two Shoes Louie
| 63 | 12 | "Girl Meets Bear" | Robin Bronner | Mackenzie Yeager | August 26, 2016 | 315 | 1.86 |
As Maya looks forward to a special offer going on at Paco's Tacos, and she and Riley are prepared to head over there, Riley discovers her teddy bear is missing. Despite having no face for more than three years because of Auggie, the bear still holds a great deal of sentimental value for Riley. This leads to a frantic search throughout the Matthews apartment, while Maya becomes completely frustrated over having no tacos to enjoy. During the search, Auggie comes across the silver boxing gloves necklace Alan gave to Cory in the Boy Meets World episode "Kid Gloves", which Cory thought was lost forever; he later gives the necklace to Auggie, hoping he will hold on to it. Otherwise, the search turns out nothing on the missing bear, and Riley eventually comes to terms with the loss. Afterward, the group finally gets to enjoy some tacos, and Riley gives Maya a bobblehead she was wanting all along from Paco's Tacos. Meanwhile, Zay expresses his appreciation to Maya for being a friend when he first came to New York and hopes she will continue to be there for him, even though Maya is seeking someday to be with Josh. Guest stars: Amir Mitchell-Townes as Zay Babineaux, Uriah Shelton as Joshua Matthews, Lindsey Lamer as Young Riley, Ivy George as Young Maya, Ocean Maturo as Young Auggie
| 64 | 13 | "Girl Meets the Great Lady of New York" | Rider Strong & Shiloh Strong | Jeff Menell | September 16, 2016 | 310 | 1.42 |
For cultural week at school, Cory has the class report on their heritage. At first, the reports are superficial, so Cory challenges the class to do deeper research on where they come from. The group learns about each other's stories and those from people at the booths of the school's cultural fair. Not everyone's heritage is a complete or a pleasant story, and Farkle has an incredibly difficult time researching his. Aside from saying he had relatives from Denmark, he stays silent about his story. When he finally opens up—revealing only one of those relatives, his great-grandfather, survived World War II—his friends understand how difficult it was for him to talk about it. Meanwhile, Auggie makes a new friend, Raffi, who is from Cuba. Guest stars: Amir Mitchell-Townes as Zay Babineaux, Ava Kolker as Ava Morgenstern, Andrew Ortega as Raffi
| 65 | 14 | "Girl Meets She Don't Like Me" | Michael A. Joseph | Jeff Menell | September 23, 2016 | 308 | 1.77 |
When Riley extends her friendship to a girl in school, she is crushed after the girl rejects her by simply saying she does not like her. It takes a while for Riley to realize she cannot control things, which her family and friends are constantly stressing to her. She asks her father to take over her health class because she is uncomfortable with how her health instructor, Mr. Fanucci, teaches, and it becomes a mess for Cory when he has to take Fanucci's place. When Mr. Fanucci takes back the health class, Riley has accepted she cannot control anything, but he clarifies to Riley and the rest of the class that they have control over their own minds and bodies, including the way they react and think to situations they are presented with. When Riley confronts the girl from the beginning of the episode again, Riley lets her know that she likes her anyway. Guest stars: Amir Mitchell-Townes as Zay Babineaux, Cecilia Balagot as Smackle, Brian Scolaro as Mr. Fanucci
| 66 | 15 | "Girl Meets World of Terror 3" | Michael A. Joseph | Joshua Jacobs | October 14, 2016 | 317 | 1.73 |
When Cory's class decides they are too old for Halloween, and they consider their change in attitude over the holiday as nothing major, Cory reminds the class about the consequences even that one small change can have on people. Auggie appears as a ghost to describe a different world, where Riley and Maya had never met to become friends, Lucas is by himself all the time, Farkle and Smackle are no more than archnemeses, and Ava and Doy are hanging out because there is no Auggie. Also, Cory is teaching history as simply names and dates, but Riley believes history is more and relaying that to her father eventually affects his teaching. Cory's secret of life message, people change people, enters into the alternate world as everyone's interactions start transforming them, including Riley and Maya becoming friends, and Auggie coming into existence. Guest stars: Ava Kolker as Ava Morgenstern, Cecilia Balagot as Smackle, Cooper Friedman as Doy, Lindsey Lamer as Young Riley, Ivy George as Young Maya
| 67 | 16 | "Girl Meets Her Monster" | Danielle Fishel | Ibrahim Ashmawey & Danielle Fishel | November 4, 2016 | 316 | 1.61 |
Riley and Maya devote a whole weekend to watching every episode of their favorite TV show, Red Planet Diaries, before its finale airs. They have a few more episodes left to watch when Topanga reminds them of their obligations, including school. When Riley fails to show up at the bakery after school to help her mother and continues watching the TV show instead, Topanga grounds her and takes away her media privileges. Riley feels she is "entitled" to make her own decisions and stands up to her mother, but she ends up moving out and living with Maya. She eventually returns home and apologizes to her mother for hurting and disobeying her. Guest stars: Amir Mitchell-Townes as Zay Babineaux, Sarah Carpenter as Sarah
| 68 | 17 | "Girl Meets Hollyworld" | Ben Savage | Mackenzie Yeager | November 18, 2016 | 318 | 1.21 |
Maya has kidnapped a famous international actress, Anastasia Boulangerie, and tells Riley she did so because she is trying to get her mother a role in a movie where she plays herself, but for which Anastasia is auditioning. The girls find out from Katy that Anastasia, whose real name is Bobbie Jo Thibodeaux, is her best friend from their youth in Arkansas and that they have lost touch since Anastasia became famous. Meanwhile, Sarah's father, director DW Preminger, is casting for that movie, written by his daughter. After Katy auditions for her eponymous role, Anastasia persuades Preminger to give Katy the part. As for the other roles in the movie, Riley, Maya, Lucas, Farkle and Zay are hoping to land the parts related to them, but Preminger rejects them all. Guest stars: Amir Mitchell-Townes as Zay Babineaux, Cheryl Texiera as Katy Hart, Stephanie Lemelin as Anastasia Boulangerie, Sarah Carpenter as Sarah Absent: August Maturo as Auggie Matthews
| 69 | 18 | "Girl Meets a Christmas Maya" | Ben Savage | Teresa Kale | December 2, 2016 | 314 | 1.20 |
Maya's mood about Christmas turns sour knowing it is the first one after her mother and Shawn got married, and she does not want Shawn to see how she and her mother have celebrated before. To boost Maya's spirits, Riley puts together a play based on A Christmas Carol which she calls "A Christmas Maya". It is revealed from Maya's past that while her mother could not afford to give her toys for Christmas, she gave her a more enduring present in allowing her to go to school with Riley and to make other friends. The play also has a part about Shawn's past, to give Maya a better understanding about her future with him. Meanwhile, the group dreads Riley's annual Secret Santa, because past gift exchanges have always turned out disastrous, and it is no different with the latest gift exchange, until the meaning behind each gift is explained to its recipient. Guest stars: Amir Mitchell-Townes as Zay Babineaux, Ava Kolker as Ava Morgenstern, Cheryl Texiera as Katy Hart, Cecilia Balagot as Smackle Absent: Peyton Meyer as Lucas Friar
| 70 | 19 | "World Meets Girl" | Joel Zwick | Matthew Nelson & Geralyn Ricciardella | January 6, 2017 | 321 | 1.45 |
The cast gives the viewers a look behind the scenes of the series. They introduce the writers and crew of the series and give a tour of the studio, the costume and prop departments, and their off-screen school. Later, live audience members take part in a question and answer session with the cast and crew. Bloopers of the series are shown in front of the audience and the cast. Throughout the episode, clips of previous episodes are shown, as well as video messages from fans of the series, all around the world. Fans are chosen in pairs of best friends to sit in the bay window set and discuss what they mean to each other. Later, Ben and Danielle reflect on their experience being on the series. In an emotional moment, Rowan and Sabrina sit in the bay window and remember their first time meeting each other. Guest stars: Amir Mitchell-Townes as Zay Babineaux, Ava Kolker as Ava Morgenstern, Cecilia Balagot as Smackle, Robert Koch as Audience Warm-Up
| 71 | 20 | "Girl Meets Sweet Sixteen" | Danielle Fishel | Michael Jacobs | January 13, 2017 | 319 | 1.36 |
Riley wants to celebrate her "Sweet Sixteen" early, which gives Cory an idea for an assignment when he teaches the class about one's personal landmarks. He wants them to think about what will happen in their junior year of high school. Riley feels confident that she and Maya will stay friends for the rest of their lives, and that they will never leave each other, but she becomes worried after realizing the future may lead to the rest of her friends going their separate ways after high school. When Riley decides she will attend the same college as Maya just to stay together, Topanga advises the two that such an arrangement may not work, even though she gave up going to Yale to be with Cory. The class presentations reveal that Farkle and Smackle, Lucas and Zay, and Riley and Maya will still be together in two years. After class, Riley and Maya want to celebrate their lasting friendship at the Matthews' place, just as Topanga shares news that she has been named a partner for the London office of her law firm, which threatens to separate the two girls. Guest stars: Amir Mitchell-Townes as Zay Babineaux, Cecilia Balagot as Smackle
| 72 | 21 | "Girl Meets Goodbye" | Joel Zwick | Michael Jacobs | January 20, 2017 | 320 | 1.64 |
Cory finally teaches his class the lesson which highlights Belgium's independence in 1831, which he has purposely held off for a long time, and it carries a profound message for Cory's class when Riley and Maya await Topanga's decision regarding whether the Matthews family will leave New York. Meanwhile, Topanga needs guidance with her decision and gathers her family and close friends into the Matthews' home for advice. During the reunion, Shawn surprises Maya with the papers to adopt her, and Auggie, worried he will be replaced when he discovers he has two Aunt Morgans, learns from them that even though he is the youngest, he is still a vital part of his family. As Riley and her friends gather at Topanga's, the reality sets in that she is leaving, so they prepare to say goodbye. Auggie and Ava do the same. After reflecting quietly at her bakery, Topanga reveals to her family she is staying in New York, as she is reminded of how Riley's bay window is a place for her huge decisions, a place Topanga never had growing up, and also is reminded of how much she loves running the bakery. As she speaks, she realizes that her bakery is her "bay window". Cory is then reminded of what he said to Josh when he was younger, at the end of Boy Meets World, about a big world out there, and it resonates with Riley. She and Maya vow to stay friends for the rest of their lives, no matter what the world has in store for them. Special guest star: William Daniels as Mr. Feeny Guest stars: Rider Strong as Shawn Hunter, Will Friedle as Eric Matthews, Amir Mitchell-Townes as Zay Babineaux, Ava Kolker as Ava Morgenstern, Cecilia Balagot as Smackle, Cheryl Texiera as Katy Hart, Uriah Shelton as Joshua Matthews, William Russ as Alan Matthews, Betsy Randle as Amy Matthews, Lee Norris as Stuart Minkus, Danny McNulty as Harley Keiner, Anthony Tyler Quinn as Jonathan Turner, Lily Nicksay as Morgan Matthews (One), Lindsay Ridgeway as Morgan Matthews (Two)

== See also ==
- List of Girl Meets World characters
