= Rowan Blanchard =

American actress (born 2001)

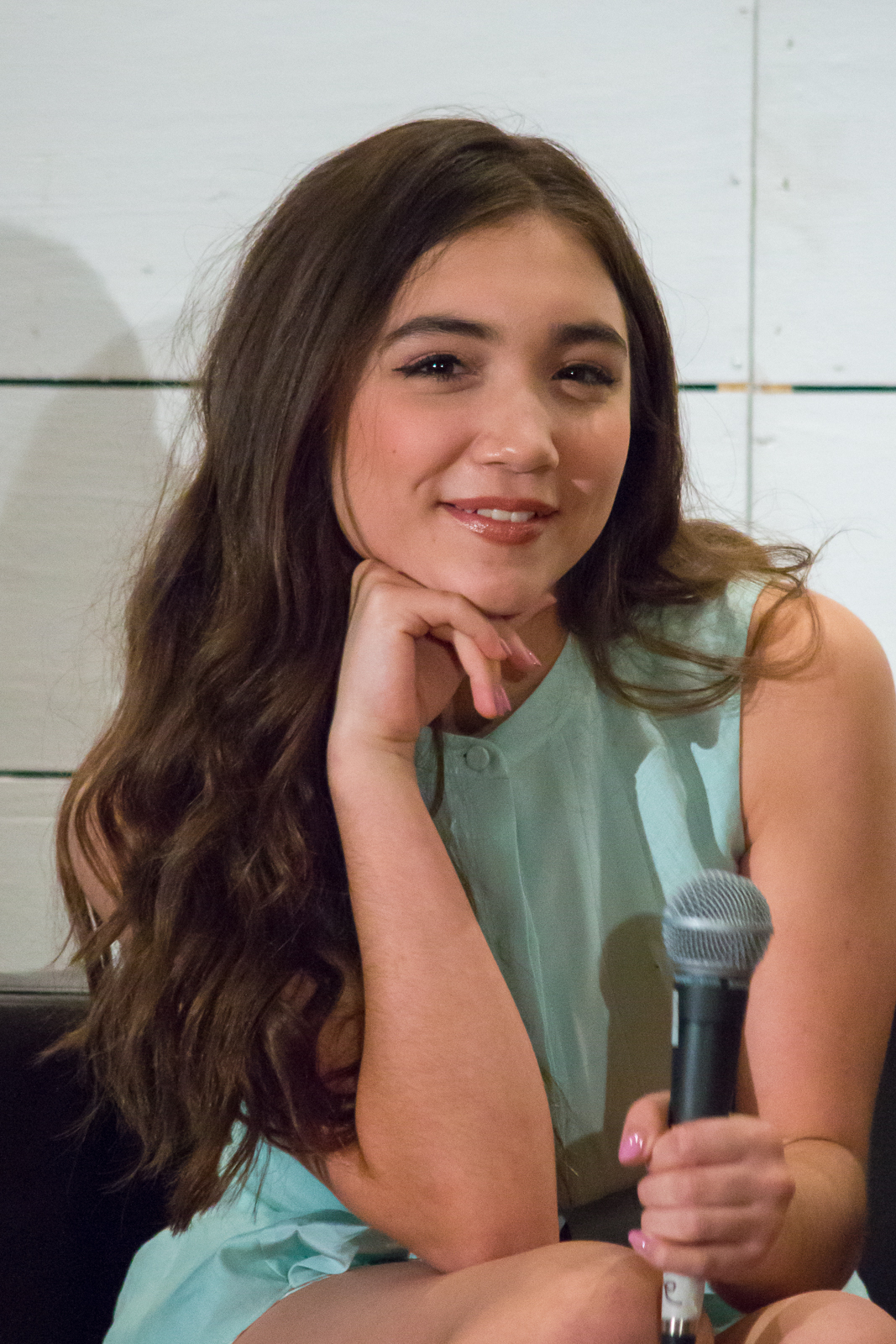
- Blanchard in 2015
- Born: October 14, 2001 (age 24); Los Angeles, California, U.S.
- Occupation: Actress
- Years active: 2006–present

Rowan Blanchard (born October 14, 2001) is an American actress. She began acting as a child and starred in the action film Spy Kids: All the Time in the World (2011). She gained wide recognition for playing Riley Matthews on the Disney Channel series Girl Meets World (2014–2017), which earned her nominations at the Kids' Choice, Teen Choice, and Young Artist Awards. She then starred in the TNT/AMC series Snowpiercer (2020–2024) and the Hulu coming-of-age film Crush (2022).

== Early life ==
Blanchard was born on October 14, 2001, in Los Angeles, California, to Elizabeth and Mark Blanchard-Boulbol, who are yoga instructors. Her great-grandfather was Syrian; and her great-grandmother was Armenian. Her paternal great-grandparents met in Aleppo, present-day Syria. She was named after a character in Anne Rice's The Witching Hour. Rowan has two younger siblings, Carmen and Shane.

== Career ==
Blanchard began acting in 2006 at the age of five, first being cast as Mona's daughter in The Back-up Plan and was in the main cast of the Disney Junior Original Series Dance-a-Lot Robot as Caitlin. In 2011, she was cast as Rebecca Wilson in Spy Kids: All the Time in the World, and as Raquel Pacheco in Little in Common. The former earned her a Young Artist Award nomination.

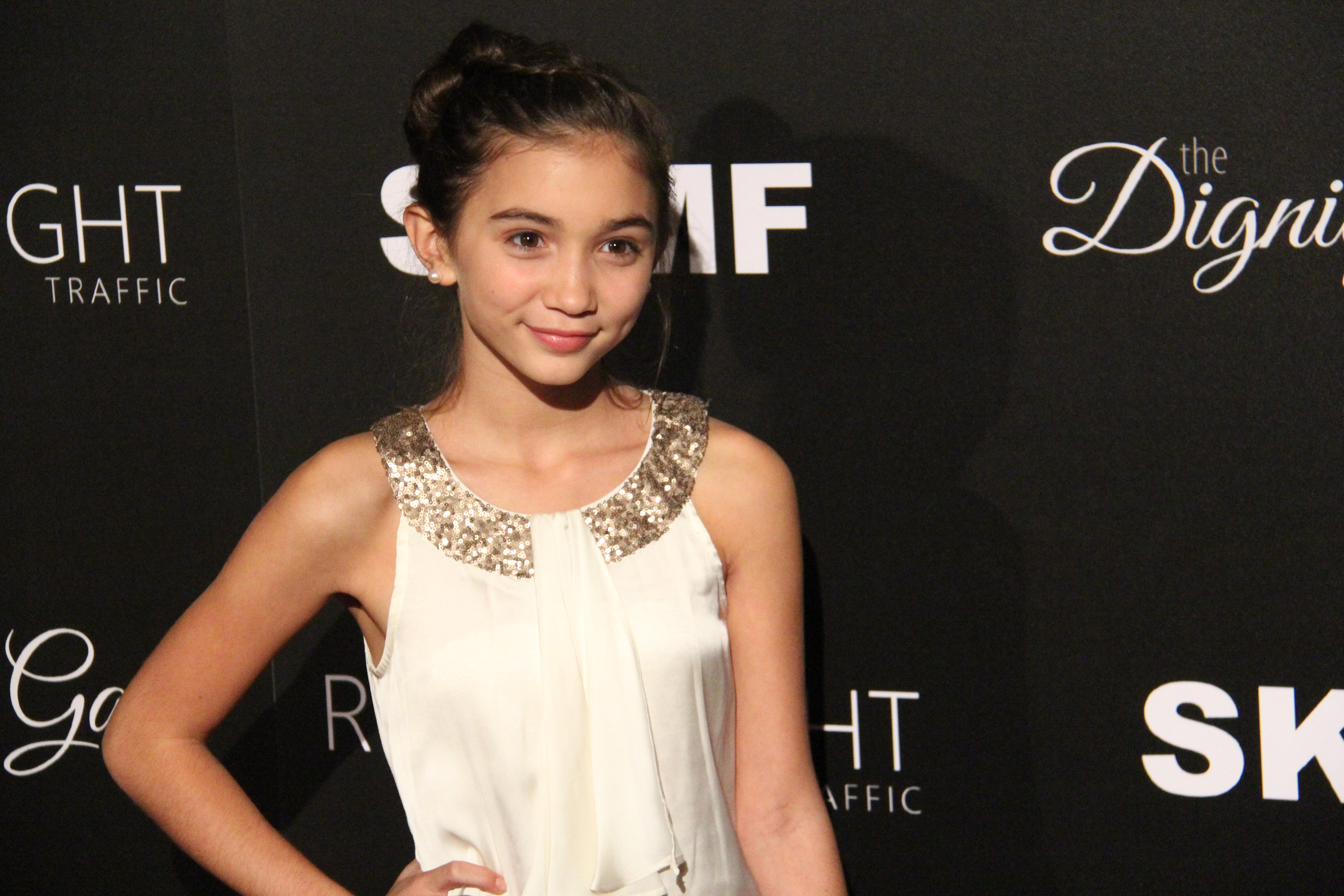
Blanchard in 2013

In 2013, Blanchard was cast in the Disney Channel series Girl Meets World, a sequel to Boy Meets World, as Riley Matthews, the daughter of Boy Meets World characters Cory Matthews and Topanga Lawrence. She also sings the title song with co-star Sabrina Carpenter, among other songs for the network. The series premiered in 2014, and ran for three seasons until 2017. Although Brian Howry of Variety gave the series a mixed review, he said that Blanchard was an "appealing lead". Max Nicholson of IGN agreed, writing that she had "the same go-getter spunk of predecessor Ben Savage, but she also nails the wide-eyed innocence that made Cory such a lovable lead in the original." He also called the "Girl Meets Rileytown" episode one of her "best performances yet, proving her dynamic range as actress once again." For Girl Meets World, she received nominations at the Nickelodeon Kids' Choice Awards, Teen Choice Awards, and Young Artist Awards. Also for Disney, she played Cleo in the 2015 Disney Channel Original Movie Invisible Sister.

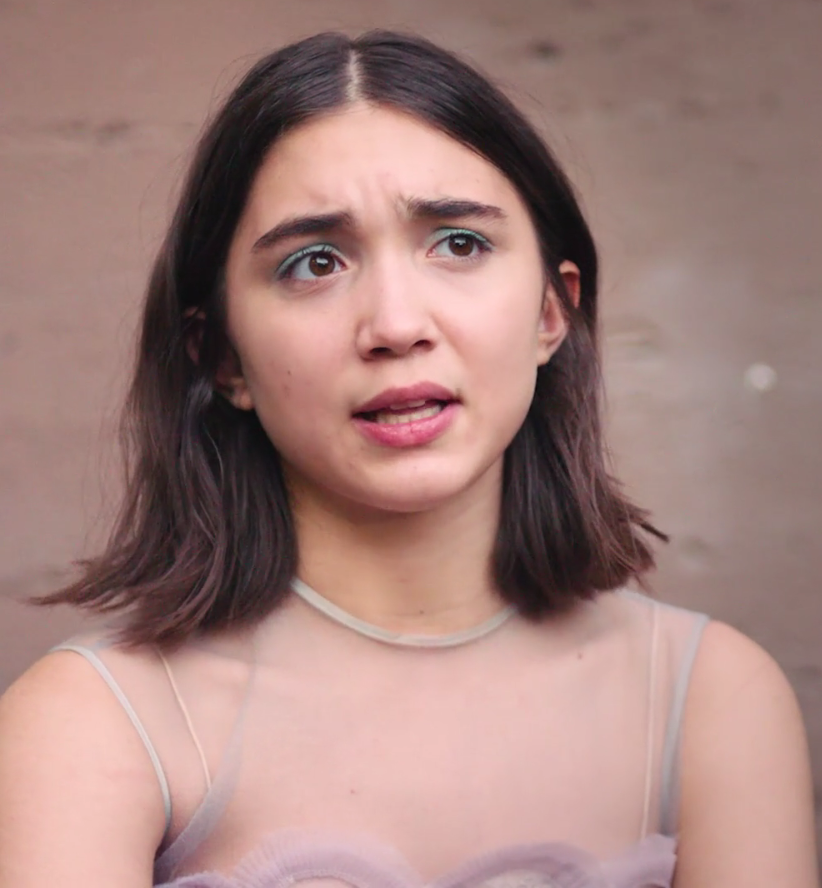
Blanchard in 2017

From 2017 to 2018, Blanchard had a recurring role as Jackie Geary on the ABC series The Goldbergs. In 2016, she was cast in the minor role of Veronica Kiley in Ava DuVernay's film A Wrinkle in Time, an adaptation of the 1962 novel of the same name. Her performance was partially improvised, and Blanchard said "I've never had so much freedom and so much trust from a director ever." It was released in 2018 to mixed reviews.

In March 2019, Blanchard was cast as Alexandra Cavill in TNT/AMC's Snowpiercer, a futuristic thriller series based on the 2013 South Korean-Czech film of the same name. The series premiered in 2020, and Blanchard was promoted to the main cast from the second season onwards. She co-stars with Jennifer Connelly, whom Blanchard told TV Insider that "I feel really, really grateful that the show provided me opportunity to work with [her] because she's been acting since she was a child and I’ve been acting since I was a child." Snowpiercer ran for four seasons with mixed to positive reviews, concluding in 2024.

It was announced in 2021 that Blanchard would co-star with Auli'i Cravalho in the Hulu movie Crush, which was released in April 2022 and became the third most streamed film of its release week. It received generally positive reviews from critics, many of whom praised Blanchard's performance. Tomris Laffly of Variety called her "instantly likeable", and Christy Lemire for RogerEbert.com wrote that both Blanchard and Cravalho "assert themselves confidently with more mature material while still bringing all that well-honed comic timing".

In 2023, Blanchard guest starred on the comedy-drama series Poker Face as Lily Albern. In 2025, she was cast as pampered teen Shunammite, a series regular role, in the Hulu dystopian drama series The Testaments, a sequel series to The Handmaid's Tale.

== Other ventures ==
Blanchard is an activist on issues such as feminism, human rights, and gun violence. Most of her comments regarding these issues are posted via Twitter or Tumblr, and she has spoken at the UN Women and US National Committee's annual conference as part of #TeamHeForShe, a feminist campaign. She was inspired to do so after being harassed at age 12, and "started putting things on Twitter, Tumblr, and Instagram, because I realize that I have a following, and most of the people who watch our show, I would say, are girls. And I didn't want them ever going through that."

In February 2018, Blanchard wrote and released the book Still Here. She began writing it in December 2015 and was assisted by her cousin who worked at a book publishing company. According to Blanchard, Still Here is not "specifically about being about being a teenage girl. It's just about growing up, whenever that is."

In April 2018, Blanchard criticized Israel and its military on her social media and shared her own post with a photo of Palestinian activist Ahed Tamimi holding the Palestinian flag. In the same post, she voiced support for the Palestinians during the 2018–2019 Gaza border protests. In May 2018, she criticized Israel once again in her social media and shared another photo of Tamimi. She wrote that "Gaza qualifies under every definition of genocide yet massacred protestors must always be identified as 'peaceful'."

In September 2024, Blanchard and 25 Palestinian and Jewish protestors were arrested outside the United Nations headquarters for disrupting the motorcade of Israeli prime minister Benjamin Netanyahu. The protestors wore shirts that labeled Netanyahu a war criminal and called to "stop the genocide", as well as demanding an end to the Israeli bombing of the Gaza Strip during the Gaza war.

== Media image ==
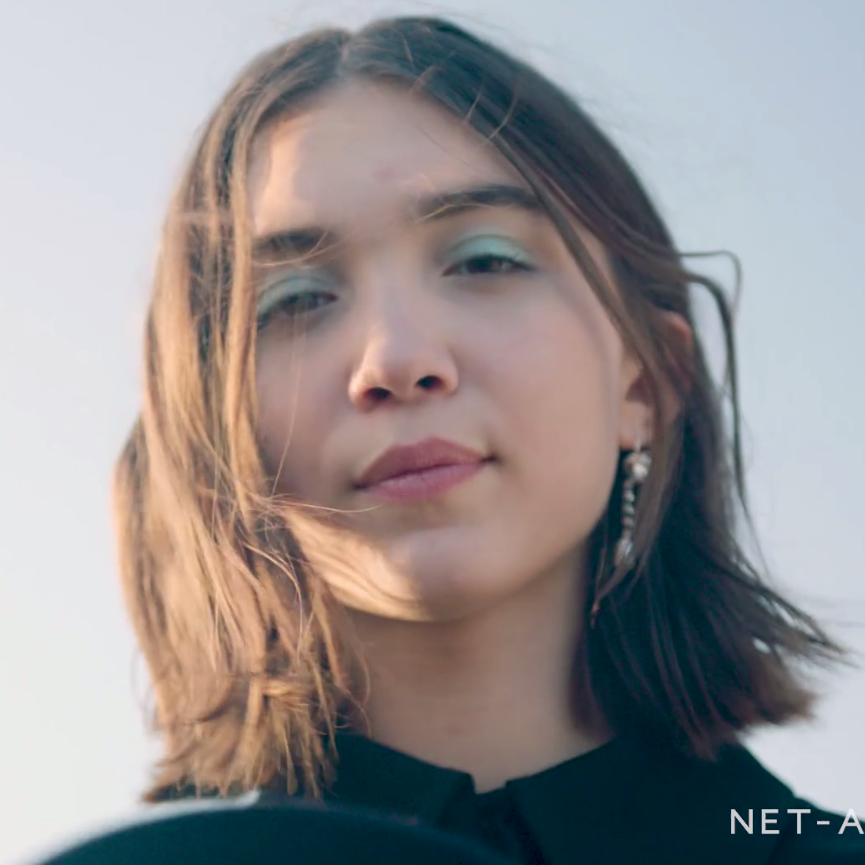
Blanchard for a photoshoot in 2017

In 2015, Time included Blanchard on their list of "Most Influential Teens". Also in 2015, Rolling Stone included her on their list of "18 Teens Shaking Up Pop Culture" and said she was "not only a strong actress but has also made a name for herself as an outspoken feminist activist". In 2016, Interview called her "one of the most exciting voices of her generation" and said "with ease" that she exuded "ease, confidence, and urgency". That same year, she appeared on Harper's Bazaar's "Rising Style Icons Under 20 Years Old" list.

== Personal life ==
In 2014, Blanchard had revealed on Instagram that she had been struggling with depression. She wrote: "As I found myself, this year in particular, going through ups and downs with depression, I realized that instead of rejecting and ostracizing these teenage feelings (human feelings), I can learn to love the intensity of them and know that everything is momentary."

In a series of tweets in January 2016, Blanchard stated that while she had "only ever liked boys" in the past, she is "open to liking any gender" and identifies as queer.

== Filmography ==
=== Film ===
Key
†	Denotes films that have not yet been released

Year	Title	Role	Notes
2010	The Back-up Plan	Mona's 7-year-old kid	Cameo appearance
2011	Little in Common	Raquel Pacheco	
2011	Spy Kids: All the Time in the World	Rebecca Wilson	
2016	The Realest Real	Paige	Short film
2018	A Wrinkle in Time	Veronica Kiley	
2019	A World Away	Jessica	
2022	Crush	Paige Evans	

=== Television ===
Year	Title	Role	Notes
2010	Dance-a-Lot Robot	Caitlin	Main role
2014–2017	Girl Meets World	Riley Matthews	Lead role
2015	Best Friends Whenever	Riley Matthews	Episode: "Cyd and Shelby's Haunted Escape"
2015	Invisible Sister	Cleo	Television film
2017–2018	The Goldbergs	Jackie Geary	Recurring role; 12 episodes
2018	Neo Yokio	Bergdorf Chan / Salesclerk 3 / Teenage Girl	Voice role; episode: "Pink Christmas"
2018–2019	Splitting Up Together	China	Episodes: "Messy", "China-curious"
2020–2024	Snowpiercer	Alexandra Cavill	Main role
2023	Poker Face	Lily Albern	Episode: "The Orpheus Syndrome"
2026–present	The Testaments	Shunammite	Main role

== Awards and nominations ==
Awards and nominations received by Rowan Blanchard
Year	Award	Category	Nominated work	Result	Ref.
2012	Young Artist Awards	Best Performance in a Feature Film — Young Actress Ten and Under	Spy Kids: All the Time in the World	Nominated	
2015	Young Artist Awards	Outstanding Young Ensemble in a TV Series	Girl Meets World	Nominated	
2016	Teen Choice Awards	Choice Summer TV Star: Female	Girl Meets World	Nominated	
2017	Kids' Choice Awards	Favorite Female TV Star	Girl Meets World	Nominated	
2017	Teen Choice Awards	Choice Changemaker	Herself	Nominated	
