= William Russ =

American actor and television director

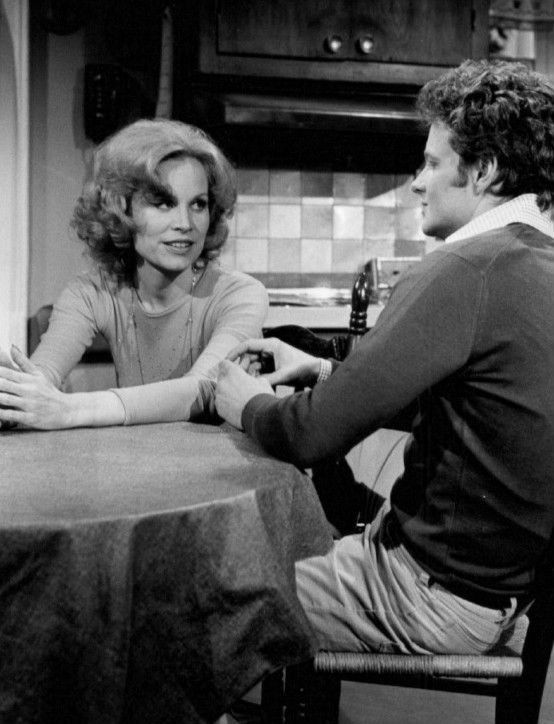
- Russ as Burt McGowan with Gail Brown on Another World, 1977.
- Born: October 20, 1950 (age 76); Portsmouth, Virginia, U.S.
- Other name: Rusty Russ
- Education: University of Michigan
- Occupations: Actor; television director
- Years active: 1977–present
- Spouse: Clare Wren
- Children: 2

William Russ (born October 20, 1950) is an American actor and television director. He played Alan Matthews on the sitcom Boy Meets World (1993–2000) and appeared in the television series Wiseguy, the soap operas Another World and The Young and the Restless and the feature films The Right Stuff (1983), Pastime (1990) and American History X (1998).

== Career ==
Russ' acting first began on the New York stage before he embarked onto a television and film career. In 1977, he had his first supporting role in Death Bed: The Bed That Eats. This film would not be officially released until 2003.

During the 1980s, Russ found work in more supporting roles such as Crisis at Central High (1981), a television film also starring Academy Award winning actress Joanne Woodward, The Border (1981), The Right Stuff (1983) as Slick Goodlin, St. Elsewhere (1986) and Crime Story (1986).

He continued finding work in both television and film. He also guest-starred in the television series Miami Vice in the notable 1985 episode "Evan" as the title character, an ATF agent who shared a history with Don Johnson's character, Sonny Crockett. He made fourteen appearances on the 1987–1990 crime drama Wiseguy as Roger Lococco.

Russ received critical acclaim when he starred in Pastime (1990) as Roy Dean Bream, a veteran minor league hurler who mentors a young phenomenon. The role earned him a nomination at the 1992 Independent Spirit Awards for "Best Male Lead.".

In 1993, he was cast as Alan Matthews on the television sitcom Boy Meets World. Russ played this role until the series ended in 2000. Russ also directed several episodes of the series during the last three seasons. His other television directing credits include directing one episode of both Lizzie McGuire and Rude Awakening.

However, he continued performing in other series and films throughout his time on Boy Meets World, primarily television films. In 1998, he performed as Danny and Derek Vinyard's father in the critically acclaimed American History X. Later, he starred in the short-lived television serial drama Mister Sterling.

In fall 2009, it was announced that Russ would be cast as the new character Tucker on The Young and the Restless. Russ' time on the show was short, however, as it has been announced the role of Tucker was being recast with Stephen Nichols replacing Russ in the role.

Russ is the star of the comedy web series Home at Last. In the series, he portrays "Bob", a homeless man who moves in with the son he abandoned at birth.

In 2014, Russ reprised his role of Alan Matthews from Boy Meets World on its spinoff Girl Meets World. In season 2, he joined the production crew, and directed one episode, being the only cast member to direct episodes of both Boy Meets World and Girl Meets World.

== Filmography ==
Film
Year	Title	Role	Notes
1977	Death Bed: The Bed That Eats	Sharon's Brother	
1979	Just You and Me, Kid	Demesta	
1980	Cruising	Paul Gaines	
1981	Cattle Annie and Little Britches	Little Dick Raidler	
1982	The Border	Jimbo	
1983	The Right Stuff	Slick Goodlin	
1984	Courage	Sonny	
1985	Beer	Merle Draggett	
1986	Wanted: Dead or Alive	Danny Quintz	Tour of Duty - Sgt Michaels
1987	Dead of Winter	Rob Sweeney	
1988	The Unholy	Luke	
1989	Disorganized Crime	Nick Bartkowski	
1991	Pastime	Roy Dean Bream	
1992	Traces of Red	Michael Dobson	
1993	Aspen Extreme	Dave Ritchie	
1997	When Danger Follows You Home	Det. Tyler Barnes	
1998	American History X	Dennis Vinyard	
2001	Buck Naked Arson	Ranger Lightcap	
2001	Life as a House		Uncredited
2009	Gary's Walk	Vernon	
2009	Pawn	Justin Elliot Randolph	Short film
2009	A Fork in the Road	Det. Ross	
2010	1,001 Ways to Enjoy the Missionary Position	Evan	
2011	Green Guys	Peter Donnelly	
2012	California Solo	Rusty	
2013	Drones	General Lawson	
2018	Between Waves	Sonny	
2019	Father By Law	Dale	Short film
2023	Founders Day	Mr. Jackson	

Television
Year	Title	Role	Notes
1978	Another World	Burt McGowan	Unknown episodes
1981	Crisis at Central High	J.O. Powell	TV movie
1982	CBS Library	Rattlesnake	Episode: "Robbers, Rooftops and Witches"
1982	Rehearsal for Murder	Frank Heller	TV movie
1982	The Dukes of Hazzard	Josh Scroggins	Episode: "The New Dukes"
1983	Remington Steele	Chance McCormick	Episode: "Steele's Gold"
1983	V	Brad	TV miniseries
1985	Riptide	Mack McPherson	Episode: "Polly Want an Explanation"
1985	Miami Vice	Evan Freed	Episode: "Evan"
1985	Hunter	Jack Lachman	Episode: "Fire Man"
1985	Command 5	J.D. Smith	TV movie
1985	The Long Hot Summer	Jody Varner	TV movie
1986	St. Elsewhere	Patrick O'Casey	Episodes: "Time Heals (1)", "Time Heals (2)"
1986	Blood & Orchids	Lloyd Murdoch	TV movie
1986	Second Serve	Josh	TV movie
1986	Houston: The Legend of Texas	William Travis	TV movie
1986	Crime Story	Det. Wes Connelly	Episodes: "Pilot (1)", "Pilot (2)", "Crime Pays"
1987	Tour of Duty	Sgt. Early Ray Michaels	Episode: "War Lover"
1988	The Loner	Jake Wilis	TV movie
1988–1990	Wiseguy	Roger Lococco	14 episodes
1989	Nasty Boys	Ben Farlow	TV movie
1990	Capital News	Redmond Dunne	13 episodes
1990	A Promise to Keep	Carl	TV movie
1991	Gabriel's Fire	Brad Fixx	Episode: "Truth and Consequences"
1991	The Young Riders	Roger	Episode: "Daisy"
1991	Crazy From the Heart	Dewey Whitcomb	TV movie
1992	Bad City Story	Jim Malone	Unsold TV pilot
1992	Drive Like Lightning	Boll Donner	TV movie
1992	Middle Ages	Terry	3 episodes
1993	The Adventures of Brisco County, Jr.	Jack Randolph	Episode: "Socrates' Sister"
1993	CBS Schoolbreak Special	Coach Jim Doane	Episode: "Other Mothers"
1993	seaQuest DSV	Rusty Thomas	Episode: "Brothers and Sisters"
1993–2000	Boy Meets World	Alan Matthews	Main role, 120 episodes, Directed 9 Episodes
1994	Viper	Mr. Townsend	Episode: Pilot
1995	Big Dreams and Broken Hearts: The Dottie West Story	Bill West	TV movie
1995	The Marshal	Loyal Truscott	Episode: "Pilot"
1995	Legend	Wild Bill Hickok	Episode: "The Life, Death, and Life of Wild Bill Hickok"
1995	Trail of Tears	David	TV movie
1996	Have You Seen My Son	Van Stein	TV movie
1996	A Husband, a Wife and a Lover	Art Maskin	TV movie
1996	Nash Bridges	Scott Lamont/"The Monk"	Episode: "Trackdown"
1997	Night Sins	Sheriff Steiger	TV miniseries
1997	Stargate SG-1	Capt. Jonas Hansen	Episode: "The First Commandment"
1999	A Secret Life	Mark Whitman	TV movie
1999	Replacing Dad	George Marsh	TV movie
1999	Come On Get Happy: The Partridge Family Story	Joseph Bonaduce	TV movie
2000	Ally McBeal	Michael Bassett	Episodes: "Two's a Crowd", "Without a Net"
2000	Level 9	Agent Colter	Episode: "A Price to Pay"
2001	Touched by an Angel	Prof. Thomas North	Episode: "Holy of Holies"
2002	The Division	Jesse Whalen	Episode: "Shelby"
2002	Crossing Jordan	D.A. Jack Olson	Episode: "There's No Place Like Home"
2002	MDs	James Wiles	Episode: "A La Casa"
2002	Robbery Homicide Division	Elliot Ayers	Episode: "City of Strivers"
2003	Mister Sterling	Tommy Doyle	Main role, 10 episodes
2003	Dragnet	Ted Paris	Episode: "Redemption"
2003	The Brotherhood of Poland, New Hampshire	Rev. Deeker	Episode: "Sleeping Lions"
2003	Finding John Christmas	Hank McAllister	TV movie
2004	Silver Lake	Phil Patterson	TV movie
2004	Deadwood	Otis Russell	Episodes: "Jewel's Boot Is Made for Walking", "Sold Under Sin"
2004	CSI: NY	Mr. Prescott	Episode: "Creatures of the Night"
2004	JAG	Maj. Gen. Earl Watson	Episodes: "Fighting Words", "This Just In from Baghdad"
2004	NYPD Blue	Hal Matheson	Episode: "I Love My Wives, But Oh You Kid"
2005	The West Wing	Dan	Episode: "Message of the Week"
2005	Without a Trace	Max Cassidy	Episode: "Freefall"
2005–2008	Boston Legal	A.D.A Christopher Palmer	5 episodes
2006	The Sopranos	Paul Calviano	Episode: "Moe n' Joe"
2006	Just Legal	Bartender	Episode: "The Bar"
2006	Reunion	Congress Clark	Episodes: "1995", "1996"
2007	Demons	Senator Carney	Unsold TV pilot
2007	Ghost Whisperer	Bill Bristow	Episode: :Dead to Rights"
2007	Numb3rs	Michael Shannon	Episode: "Money for Nothing"
2007	Standoff	Warren Keegan	Episode: "Road Trip"
2007	CSI: Crime Scene Investigation	Jonah Quinn	Episode: "The Case of the Cross-Dressing Carp"
2008	Wildfire	Congressman Dean Nichols	Episode: "The More Things Change (1)", "The More Things Change (2)", "Friendship/Passion"
2008	The Ex List	Jimmy Bloom	Recurring role, 9 episodes
2009	The Mentalist	Dooley Gerber	Episode: "Black Gold and Red Blood"
2009–2010	The Young and the Restless	Tucker McCall	
2010	Cold Case	Tim Hudson	Episode: "The Last Drive-In"
2011	Home At Last	Bob	Episodes 1–6
2011	90210	Salty's Place owner	Episode: "Up in Smoke"
2011	Leverage	Morris Beck	Episode: "The 10 Li'l Grifters Job"
2012	Criminal Minds	Donald Collins	Episode: "A Family Affair"
2012	Awake	Jim Mayhew	Episode: "Guilty"
2012	NCIS	Phillip Wickes	Episode: "The Tell"
2014–2017	Girl Meets World	Alan Matthews	Episodes: "Girl Meets Home for the Holidays", "Girl Meets Goodbye" (Directed "Girl Meets Hurricane")
2015	Scandal	Frank Holland	Episode: "Even the Devil Deserves a Second Chance"
2017	Colony	Hennessey	3 episodes
2017	Grimm	Scott Mudgett	Breakfast in Bed
2018	Bosch	Captain Garwood	3 episodes
2019	9-1-1	Chuck	2 episodes
2022	Animal Kingdom	Tre	3 episodes

== Awards and nominations ==
Independent Spirit Awards

- 1992: Nominated, "Best Male Lead" – Pastime
