= Chalmers Goodlin =

American test pilot

Chalmers Hubert Goodlin
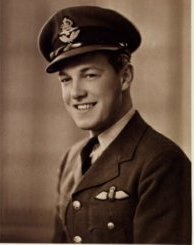
- Born: January 2, 1923; Greensburg, Pennsylvania, U.S.
- Died: October 20, 2005 (aged 82); Palm Beach, Florida, U.S.
- Military career
- Branch: Royal Canadian Air Force; United States Navy; Israeli Air Force
- Service years: 1941–1943, 1948
- Nickname: Slick
- Conflicts: World War II; 1948 Arab-Israeli War

Chalmers Hubert "Slick" Goodlin (January 2, 1923 – October 20, 2005) was the second test pilot of the Bell X-1 supersonic rocket plane, and the first to operate the craft in powered flight.

== Biography ==
=== Early life and World War II service ===
Goodlin was born on January 2, 1923, in Greensburg, Pennsylvania. He began learning to fly at the age of 15, and joined the Royal Canadian Air Force in 1941 on his eighteenth birthday, inspired by the tremendous air battles over the English Channel in early World War II, but was unable to participate as part of the American military since the U.S. had not yet entered the war. He became the youngest commissioned officer in the RCAF and entered the European theater in 1942. By December of that year, the U.S. Navy had requested that Goodlin transfer back to the States, where he underwent training to become a Navy test pilot. He was released from active duty and found employment with Bell Aircraft as a test pilot in December 1943.

=== Test pilot ===
The Bell Aircraft Corporation built the X-1 in an attempt to break the sound barrier in the 1940s. Goodlin became one of the first certified jet pilots in the United States. He was the second pilot to fly the X-1. Goodlin's first, unpowered, flight was on October 11, 1946, at Muroc AFB, California. After a further three glide flights, Goodlin became the first pilot of the X-1 in powered flights, on December 9, 1946, in the #2 aircraft. (The #1 aircraft had been returned to Bell's Buffalo, New York, plant for modifications.) Goodlin made another 11 flights in the #2 aircraft before flying the newly modified #1 aircraft. The modifications to the #1 aircraft included new wings (8% thickness/chord ratio as opposed to 10% thickness/chord ratio of the #2 aircraft) and a new horizontal stabilizer (6% thickness/chord ratio as opposed to 8% thickness/chord ratio of the #2 aircraft). Goodlin's first flight in the modified #1 aircraft was April 10, 1947. He flew the X-1 a total of 26 times, pushing it near the sound barrier. Goodlin joined the "Caterpillar Club" two times after bailing out of aircraft during test flights.

The X-1 program was taken over by the United States Air Force after Goodlin demanded $150,000 and additionally demanded hazard pay for every minute spent over Mach 0.85. The Bell program was also very conservative, increasing speed by only Mach 0.02 per flight. Subsequently, the sound barrier was broken by Captain Chuck Yeager in 1947. Goodlin later denied ever making the demand for extra pay. Goodlin stated that he had made a deal with Bob Stanley of Bell to make the first supersonic flight before turning the plane over to the United States Air Force, but they wanted a man in uniform to make the flight for the sake of better publicity.

=== Israeli service ===
In 1948 Goodlin served as a Mahal (foreign volunteer) pilot in the newly formed Israeli Air Force, and fought in the 1948 Arab-Israeli War. During the war, while flying an IAF Supermarine Spitfire LF Mk IXe fighter, he was involved in the shooting down of three British Spitfire Mk XVIII reconnaissance fighters. Goodlin later became the chief test pilot for the IAF. Later, when hostilities ceased, he flew Douglas DC-4s for Near East Air Transport on humanitarian missions, carrying thousands of Jewish refugees to Israel from Aden, Arabia and Germany.

=== Civilian life ===
He continued his career in aviation, owning Seychelles-Kilimanjaro Air Transport, and other companies supplying parts and aircraft to various airlines and other concerns. He led joint ventures with an ex-Le Mans and F1 driver, the decorated Battle of Britain veteran Wing Commander Roger "Dennis" Poore – to whom Goodlin was known as "Chal" (as he was to his friends and family), in internationally leasing/chartering used aircraft and creating the first Dutch air charter company (Transavia) at Schiphol Airport, Amsterdam, Netherlands, in the mid-1960s.

=== Awards, later life and death ===
What he considered the pinnacle of his career, however, was becoming involved with, and ultimately chairman and CEO of, the Burnelli Company. Goodlin was a proponent of "lifting fuselage" (also known as Burnelli) aircraft designs, whose proponents argue create far safer airliners. Among his other numerous achievements, Goodlin was a nominee for the National Aviation Hall of Fame, was inducted into the Florida Aviation Hall of Fame, the American Rocket Society (Honorary Member 1946), received a Commendation from the American Red Cross for Humanitarian Efforts in Nigerian Relief Operations and Biafra (1969), elected into the Niagara Frontier Aviation Hall of Fame (1987), Society of Experimental Test Pilots (Honorary Fellow 1991) and received the Wright Brothers Memorial Award from the Greater Miami Aviation Association (1992). He enjoyed memberships in the Royal Aero Club, the Quiet Birdmen, the Caterpillar Club, the OX-5 Club, The Greater Miami Aviation Association as a Senior Member and the American Institute of Aeronautics and Astronautics.

Goodlin died on October 20, 2005, in Palm Beach, Florida. He had two brief marriages one to Eleonore Zak and one to actress Wendy Waldron.

== In popular culture ==
Goodlin was portrayed by William Russ in the 1983 film version of The Right Stuff.
