= Beer (film) =

1985 film

- Directed by: Patrick Kelly
- Written by: Allan Weisbecker
- Produced by: Robert Chartoff
- Starring: Loretta Swit; Rip Torn; Kenneth Mars; David Alan Grier; William Russ; Ralph Manza; Saul Stein; David Wohl; Dick Shawn
- Cinematography: Bill Butler
- Music by: Bill Conti
- Production company: Orion Pictures
- Distributed by: Orion Pictures
- Release date: August 30, 1985
- Running time: 83 minutes
- Country: United States
- Language: English

Beer (also known as The Selling of America) is a 1985 American comedy film produced by Orion Pictures that satirizes the advertising industry, specifically the TV commercial industry.

== Plot ==
Cynical ad executive B. D. Tucker (Loretta Swit) is desperate not to lose the account of the financially ailing Norbecker Brewery. When three losers (David Alan Grier, William Russ, and Saul Stein) inadvertently prevent a robbery in a bar, Tucker and her minions give them a macho image and center an entire ad campaign around them.

== Cast ==
- Loretta Swit as B. D. Tucker
- Rip Torn as Buzz Beckman
- David Alan Grier as Elliott Morrison
- Saul Stein as Frankie Falcone
- Kenneth Mars as Norbecker
- William Russ as Merle Draggett
- Dick Shawn as Talk Show Host
