= Peyton Meyer =

American actor (born 1998)

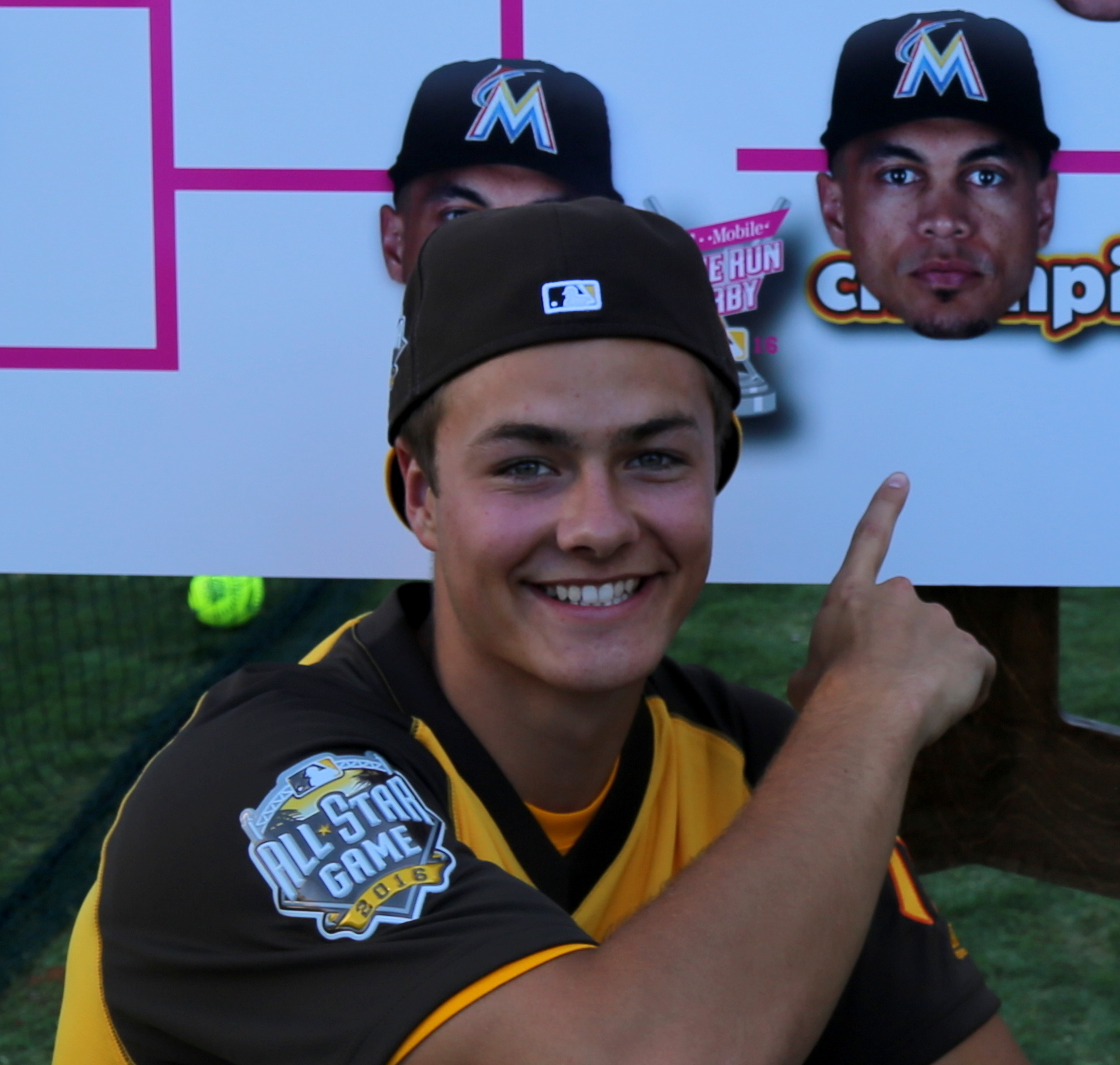
- Meyer in 2016
- Born: November 24, 1998 (age 27)
- Occupation: Actor
- Years active: 2013–present
- Spouses: Taylor Mae LaCour (m. 2021; sep. 2024)
- Children: 1

Peyton Meyer (born November 24, 1998) is an American actor. He is known for his role as Lucas Friar on the Disney Channel television series Girl Meets World, and his earlier recurring role as Wes Manning on Disney Channel's Dog with a Blog. He starred in the 2021 Netflix film He's All That. From 2024 to 2025, he appeared on the soap opera Days of Our Lives.

== Career ==
In 2013, Meyer made his acting debut in the Disney Channel television series Dog with a Blog. In 2014, he had a main role in the television series Girl Meets World, spinoff of Boy Meets World where he plays the role of Lucas Friar. Meyer also guest starred on Best Friends Whenever, where he reprised his role as Lucas Friar.

In 2016, Meyer starred as Tommy in the family comedy film Gibby, which tells the story of a monkey who brings happiness to a grief-stricken girl. In 2017, he played the role of Ethan in Go90's web series Versus. From 2018 to 2021, he played the recurring role of Trip, Taylor's (Meg Donnelly) boyfriend, in the ABC series American Housewife. In November 2024, it was revealed Meyer had joined the cast of Days of Our Lives as Doug Williams III. He exited the role during the July 25, 2025, episode.

== Personal life ==
In October 2021, Meyer announced that he had married musician Taela and that the two were expecting their first child together, who was born in March 2022. He is also a stepfather to her son. Peyton and Taela separated in 2024.

== Filmography ==
Television and film roles
Year	Title	Role	Notes
2013–2014	Dog with a Blog	Wes Manning	Recurring role, 7 episodes
2014–2017	Girl Meets World	Lucas Friar	Main role
2015	Best Friends Whenever	Lucas Friar	Episode: "Cyd and Shelby's Haunted Escape"
2016	Gibby	Tommy	Film
2017	Versus	Ethan	Web series, 6 episodes
2018–2021	American Housewife	Trip Windsor	Recurring role (seasons 2–5)
2019	Wayne	Bradley	Episode: "It'll Last Forever"
2019	Celebrity Family Feud	Himself	Episode: "Maulers vs. Brawlers and Descendants 3 vs. American Housewife
2021	He's All That	Jordan Van Draanen	Film
2024–2025	Days of Our Lives	Doug Williams III	Series regular; December 2, 2024, to July 25, 2025.

== Awards and nominations ==
Year	Award	Category	Work	Result	Refs
2015	Young Artist Award	Outstanding Young Ensemble in a TV Series	Girl Meets World	Nominated	
2016	Teen Choice Awards	Choice Summer TV Actor	Girl Meets World	Nominated	
