= Jackie Geary =

American actress, writer, and producer

- Born: August 22, 1977 (age 48); Port Jefferson, New York, U.S.
- Education: Barnard College (BA)
- Occupations: Actress, writer, producer
- Years active: 2002–present

Jackie Geary (born August 22, 1977) is an American actress, writer, and producer known for her recurring roles in NCIS, 13 Reasons Why, and The Goldbergs. Geary was born in Port Jefferson, New York and earned a Bachelor of Arts degree in women's history from Barnard College.

== Filmography ==
=== Film ===
Year	Title	Role	Notes
2005	In Her Shoes	My Marcia	
2007	Look	Paige	
2009	Soul Fire Rising	Serpica	
2009	Miss Ohio	Cassie	
2013	White House Down	Jenna Bydwell	
2017	Eliza Sherman's Revenge	Eliza Sherman	Also producer

=== Television ===
Year	Title	Role	Notes
2002	The Jamie Kennedy Experiment	Jamie's A.D.	Episode #2.6
2003	What I Like About You	Kira Martin / Rep	2 episodes
2003	Good Morning, Miami	Angela	Episode: "Someone to Watch Over Gavin"
2003	Will & Grace	Cashier	Episode: "Fanilow"
2004	Passions	Surrogate Candidate #2	Episode #1.1213
2004	Strong Medicine	Caroline	Episode: "Goodbye/Rest in Peace"
2005	LAX	Opal	Episode: "Mixed Signals"
2005	The Inside	Mousey Control Freak	Episode: "Old Wounds"
2005	How I Met Your Mother	Jackie	Episode: "Return of the Shirt"
2005	Hot Properties	Bride-To-Be #2	Episode: "When Chloe Met Marco"
2005, 2006	Related	Justine	2 episodes
2006	Campus Ladies	Lisa	Episode: "Night of the Condom"
2006	Criminal Minds	Pinky Robertson	Episode: "Somebody's Watching"
2006	Huff	Hotel Clerk	Episode: "Which Lip Is the Cervical Lip?"
2007	In Case of Emergency	Tony	Episode: "It's Got to Be the Morning After"
2008	Polar Opposites	Kimi	Television film
2009	Without a Trace	Audrey Salke	Episode: "Believe Me"
2009	United States of Tara	Kirston	Episode: "Snow"
2009	Castle	Maggie Dowd/Carla Coldblood	Episode: "A Death in the Family"
2009–2013	NCIS	Agent Susan Grady	3 episodes
2010	Bones	Geneva Soloway	Episode: "The Babe in the Bar"
2011	Rizzoli & Isles	Maggie McGee	Episode: "Rebel Without a Pause"
2012	Suburgatory	Ms. Evans	Episode: "Poetic Injustice"
2012	Weeds	Deb	Episode: "Unfreeze"
2013–2014	Jon and Jen Are Married	Jen	16 episodes
2015	How to Get Away with Murder	Jackie Groves	Episode: "Best Christmas Ever"
2017	12 Monkeys	Mona	Episode: "Causality"
2017	Lucifer	Tiffany James	Episode: "My Brother's Keeper"
2017–2018	13 Reasons Why	Amber Foley	6 episodes
2017–2018	The Goldbergs	Lynn Geary	3 episodes
2020	I'm Sorry	Laura	Episode #3.1
2022	Young Sheldon	Ann	Episode: "A Pink Cadillac and a Glorious Tribal Dance"
2022	Star Trek: Picard	Mona	Episode: "Fly Me to the Moon"
2022	Grace and Frankie	Shelly	Episode: "The Casino"
2023	Night Court (2023 TV series)	Tess	Episode: "A Night Court Before Christmas"
