= Girl Meets World =

American sitcom

- Genre: Sitcom
- Created by: Michael Jacobs & April Kelly
- Starring: Rowan Blanchard; Ben Savage; Sabrina Carpenter; Peyton Meyer; August Maturo; Danielle Fishel; Corey Fogelmanis
- Theme music composer: Matthew Tishler; Maria Christensen; Shridhar Solanki
- Opening theme: "Take On the World" by: Rowan Blanchard; Sabrina Carpenter
- Composer: Ray Colcord
- Country of origin: United States
- Original language: English
- No. of seasons: 3
- No. of episodes: 72 (list of episodes)

Production
- Executive producer: Michael Jacobs
- Producer: Randi Barnes
- Camera setup: Multi-camera
- Running time: 20–24 minutes
- Production companies: Michael Jacobs Productions; It's a Laugh Productions

Original release
- Network: Disney Channel
- Release: June 27, 2014 – January 20, 2017

Related
- Boy Meets World (1993–2000)

Girl Meets World is an American sitcom created by Michael Jacobs and April Kelly that premiered on Disney Channel on June 27, 2014. The series ran for three seasons, consisting of 72 episodes, and concluded on January 20, 2017. The series is a spin-off of Boy Meets World and stars Rowan Blanchard, Ben Savage, Sabrina Carpenter, Peyton Meyer, August Maturo, Danielle Fishel, and Corey Fogelmanis.

The series centers around the life of Riley and her friends and family, particularly their school life, in which Cory is their history teacher. Riley shares a strong relationship with her best friend Maya Hart, who assists her in learning to cope with social and personal issues of adolescence. Several Boy Meets World cast members reprise their roles in the series.

== Premise ==
It has been several years since Cory and Topanga Matthews moved to New York City. The series follows their daughter, Riley Matthews, and her best friend, Maya Hart, as they navigate challenges of life and school. Following along with them are their classmates Lucas Friar and Farkle Minkus and Riley's younger brother Auggie.

== Episodes ==
Season	Episodes	Originally released	
Season	Episodes	First released	Last released
1	20	June 27, 2014	March 27, 2015
Special		April 17, 2015	
2	30	May 11, 2015	March 11, 2016
3	21	June 3, 2016	January 20, 2017

== Cast ==
- Rowan Blanchard as Riley Matthews
- Ben Savage as Cory Matthews
- Sabrina Carpenter as Maya Hart
- Peyton Meyer as Lucas Friar
- August Maturo as Auggie Matthews
- Danielle Fishel as Topanga Matthews
- Corey Fogelmanis as Farkle Minkus

== Production ==
=== Development ===
In November 2012, it was reported that Disney Channel was in the early stages of development of a follow-up series titled Girl Meets World, which would center on Cory and Topanga's 12-year-old daughter Riley. The original idea for the series was developed by Corey Marsh, an executive director at Disney Channel, who approached Michael Jacobs, co-creator of Boy Meets World, to produce a similar series for a new generation of children as executive producer and showrunner. The idea was to create a modern version of the show from a different perspective to the original. On November 26, 2012, it was confirmed by Ben Savage and Danielle Fishel that they would be reprising their roles as Cory Matthews and Topanga Lawrence-Matthews in the series. In February 2013, it was announced that Michael Jacobs had reached out to all of the former Boy Meets World cast members to take part in the new series. On June 17, 2013, Disney Channel officially greenlit a series order for Girl Meets World, which began production that summer. On January 23, 2014, the first season order was increased from its initial 13-episode count to 20 to make a full season. On May 2, 2014, a full trailer for Girl Meets World was released. On May 21, 2014, the pilot episode became available as a preview to users on the various Watch Disney Channel mobile and television apps which require TV Everywhere authentication to watch. Following the TV premiere of the pilot, the episode "Girl Meets Sneak Attack" was made available via the apps. On June 13, 2014, the pilot was made available for free on iTunes. On August 6, 2014, Girl Meets World was renewed for a second season by Disney Channel. The second season premiered on May 11, 2015. The third season of Girl Meets World was announced on November 25, 2015. The third season premiered on June 3, 2016.

=== Casting ===
Auditions began in mid-November 2012 for the lead roles of Riley Matthews, the daughter of Cory and Topanga, Maya, a witty friend of Riley's who has a troubled past, and Elliot, Riley's older brother. By the end of January 2013, Rowan Blanchard and Sabrina Carpenter were cast as Riley and Maya, respectively. Teo Halm was tapped for the role of Elliot in early March. Filming of the pilot began on March 20, 2013, and concluded on March 22, 2013. Rider Strong and Will Friedle made a surprise visit to the set, sparking rumors of a return, or at least a cameo appearance, in the upcoming series. Maitland Ward also made a visit to the set and was asked about the return of her character, Rachel McGuire. Ward said, "I can't really share any show info, but it would be fun if the old gang got back together again!" On October 5, 2013, Teo Halm announced on Twitter that he was no longer involved with the series. A report by TVLine suggested the series was undergoing creative changes after the pilot and his character was ultimately written out of the series. On March 12, 2014, it was announced that Lee Norris would reprise his role of Stuart Minkus. On March 18, 2014, it was announced that Rider Strong would reprise his role of Shawn Hunter. On December 3, 2014, it was announced that Will Friedle would reprise his role of Eric Matthews, beginning with the second season, along with William Daniels reprising his role as George Feeny in a larger role. On February 3, 2015, it was announced that Trina McGee would reprise her role as Angela Moore and Blake Clark would reprise his role of Chet Hunter. On April 7, 2015, it was announced that Anthony Tyler Quinn would reprise his role as Jonathan Turner. On June 5, 2015, it was announced that Matthew Lawrence would reprise his role as Jack Hunter. On April 1, 2016, it was announced that Reginald VelJohnson would guest star in an episode as a police officer, a nod to VelJohnson's previous role in a different TGIF sitcom, officer Carl Winslow of Family Matters. On July 28, 2016, it was announced that Lily Nicksay and Lindsay Ridgeway, both of whom portrayed Morgan Matthews, would appear in the season three finale.

In a 2025 episode of the rewatch podcast Pod Meets World, Fishel described the work environment on Girl Meets World to have been a "very, very difficult" environment compared to the fun she had on Boy Meets World, stating that she felt "ostracized" and "very criticized" during her time working on the show.

=== Ending ===
On January 4, 2017, the series' writers stated on their group Twitter account that they were informed by Disney Channel that the series would not be renewed for a fourth season. Viewers of the series led a fan campaign appealing to Netflix to renew the program, noting that as the characters aged, the show was beginning to outgrow Disney Channel's target demographic. Jacobs expressed "I don't think Girl should have been cancelled" and stated he would be interested in continuing the series, revealing that the process was in its "beginning stages" with "interested platforms". The cancellation of the series sparked attention in the media. Janelle Okwodu of Vogue reported that the announcement "sent shockwaves through social media—in part because it meant one less realistic depiction on-screen of what it is to be a young woman". Of the series, TVLine reporter Andy Swift suggested that it "maybe shouldn't have been canceled so soon into its run", and Brandon Katz of Forbes commented "the series laid out countless positive moral lessons for its young viewers". Bustle reporter Sabienna Bowman described the program as a "landmark show", stating, "Girl Meets World captured the hearts of the bright, socially aware generation who have grown up in the age of social media", while commending how it dealt with issues centered around young women.

After four months of searching for a viable network, on May 3, 2017, co-creator Jacobs confirmed that he was unable to come to an agreement with any outlet to continue the show, thus effectively ending the series.

== Broadcast ==
The series originally premiered in the United States on Disney Channel and in Canada on Family Channel on June 27, 2014. The series premiered on Disney Channel in Australia on August 25, 2014, and in the United Kingdom and Ireland on August 29, 2014. In the Balkan countries, Greece, the Middle East and Africa, the series began airing on Disney Channel on November 15, 2014. The series started airing on Disney Channel in Canada on September 1, 2015; the episode "Girl Meets I Am Farkle" premiered on Disney Channel in Canada on September 3, 2015, which was before its initial airing in the U.S. on September 11, 2015.

== Reception ==
=== Critical ===
Review aggregator Rotten Tomatoes gives the series an 84% approval rating based on reviews from 19 critics. The site's consensus states: "Though not quite as comical, Girl Meets World sweetly shares the nostalgia of its predecessor, Boy Meets World, with its young audience while providing positive moral values for today's youth." Metacritic gives the series a score of 64 based on reviews from 10 critics, indicating "generally favorable reviews". The series premiere received positive reviews. Kevin Fallon of The Daily Beast called it a "perfectly pleasant Disney Channel show". Rob Owen of Pittsburgh Post-Gazette said it was "a cute half-hour that capably introduces new characters and sets the table for the new series". Diane Werts of Newsday said the series "does its job of bringing tween-based family viewing into the 2010s".

=== Ratings ===
Viewership and ratings per season of Girl Meets World
Season	Episodes	First aired		Last aired		Avg. viewers (millions)
Season	Episodes	Date	Viewers (millions)	Date	Viewers (millions)	Avg. viewers (millions)
1	20	June 27, 2014	5.16	March 27, 2015	2.28	2.74
2	30	May 11, 2015	2.05	March 11, 2016	1.70	2.28
3	21	June 3, 2016	1.89	January 20, 2017	1.64	1.70

=== Awards and nominations ===
Year	Award	Category	Recipient	Result	Ref.
2014	Teen Choice Awards	Choice Summer TV Show	Girl Meets World	Nominated	
2015	Writers Guild of America Award	Children's Script - Episodic and Specials	Matthew Nelson for "Girl Meets 1961"	Nominated	
2015	Teen Choice Awards	Choice TV Show: Comedy	Girl Meets World	Nominated	
2015	Primetime Creative Arts Emmy Awards	Outstanding Children's Program	Girl Meets World	Nominated	
2016	Writers Guild of America Award	Children's Script - Episodic and Specials	Mark Blutman for "Girl Meets I Am Farkle"	Nominated	
2016	Kids' Choice Awards	Favorite TV Show	Girl Meets World	Nominated	
2016	Artios Awards	Children's Pilot and Series (Live Action)	Girl Meets World	Won	
2016	Teen Choice Awards	Choice Summer TV Show	Girl Meets World	Nominated	
2016	Kids Choice Awards Mexico	Favorite International Program	Girl Meets World	Nominated	
2016	Primetime Creative Arts Emmy Awards	Outstanding Children's Program	Girl Meets World	Nominated	
2017	Writers Guild of America Award	Children's Script - Episodic and Specials	Joshua Jacobs & Michael Jacobs for "Girl Meets Commonism"	Nominated	
2017	Producers Guild of America Award	Outstanding Children's Program	Girl Meets World (Season 2, Season 3)	Nominated	
2017	Humanitas Prize	Children's Live Action	Matthew Nelson for "Girl Meets the Forgiveness Project"	Nominated	
2017	Kids' Choice Awards	Favorite TV Show (Kids)	Girl Meets World	Nominated	
2017	Primetime Creative Arts Emmy Awards	Outstanding Children's Program	Girl Meets World	Nominated	
