= Boy Meets World season 6 =

Boy Meets World
- Season 6
- Season 6 DVD cover
- Starring: Ben Savage; William Daniels; Betsy Randle; Will Friedle; Rider Strong; Danielle Fishel; Lindsay Ridgeway; Trina McGee-Davis; Maitland Ward; Matthew Lawrence; William Russ
- No. of episodes: 22

Release
- Original network: ABC
- Original release: September 25, 1998 – May 14, 1999

Season chronology
- ← Previous; Season 5 Next → Season 7

The sixth season of the television comedy series Boy Meets World aired between September 25, 1998 and May 14, 1999, on ABC in the United States. The season was produced by Michael Jacobs Productions and Touchstone Television with series creator Michael Jacobs as executive producer. It was broadcast as part of the ABC comedy block TGIF on Friday evenings.

== Cast ==
- Ben Savage as Cory Matthews
- William Daniels as George Feeny (Note: In previous seasons (2-5), series regulars who were not present in an episode are usually uncredited, but in this season series regulars William Daniels, Betsy Randle, Danielle Fishel, Lindsay Ridgeway, Trina McGee-Davis, Maitland Ward, Matthew Lawrence, and William Russ are credited for the episodes that they were not present in.) (Note: Credited for the episodes that he/she did not appear in.)
- Betsy Randle as Amy Matthews
- Will Friedle as Eric Matthews
- Rider Strong as Shawn Hunter
- Danielle Fishel as Topanga Lawrence
- Lindsay Ridgeway as Morgan Matthews
- Trina McGee-Davis as Angela Moore
- Maitland Ward as Rachel McGuire
- Matthew Lawrence as Jack Hunter
- William Russ as Alan Matthews

== Episodes ==
Boy Meets World Season 6 Episodes
No. overall	No. in season	Title	Directed by	Written by	Original release date	Prod. code	Viewers (millions)
114	1	"His Answer (Part 1)"	Jeff McCracken	Bob Tischler	September 25, 1998	B766	13.06
Cory deals with the shock of Topanga's proposal. He accepts, but a less-than-positive reaction from his parents prompts them to sneak off to elope, while Eric and Jack get a new roommate named Rachel, who they immediately start competing for. To be continued... Guest stars: Bill Morey as Judge Bemis, Connie Sawyer as Foofie Note: Trina McGee-Davis and Maitland Ward join the main cast.
115	2	"Her Answer (Part 2)"	David Kendall	Matthew Nelson	October 2, 1998	B767	12.42
If he was stunned when Topanga proposed, then Cory is completely speechless when Topanga comes to realize that she cannot say "I do". During the drive home, he admits that she was right; they are not ready to be married, and they want their families to be there when they are ready. When they arrive home, they find that everyone has thrown the "newlyweds" a celebration. But before they can announce the truth, Amy confronts Topanga, asking why she couldn't have just gone to Yale instead of proposing marriage. After Topanga leaves, Cory reprimands his mom and reveals the truth. Meanwhile, both Eric and Jack compete for Rachel's attention. The newlywed party is later turned into a retirement party for Mr. Feeny, which is then interrupted by an angry (and comedic) diatribe from Eric. Guest stars: Connie Sawyer as Foofie, Bill Morey as Judge Bemis
116	3	"Ain't College Great?"	William Russ	Jeff Menell	October 9, 1998	B769	12.57
On the first day of college, an ambitious Cory fills his schedule with tough courses, but quickly cracks under the pressure – and flees to Mr. Feeny's side in Wyoming for help. Meanwhile, Eric tries to be more sensitive so that Rachel will be attracted to him. Guest stars: Mark Tymchyshyn as Guidance Counselor, William Windom as Ned, Keone Young as Professor, Bob Tischler as Another Professor
117	4	"Friendly Persuasion"	Jeff McCracken	Barbie Feldman	October 16, 1998	B770	12.09
After she and Shawn call it quits because he "wants to meet new people", Angela shuns Cory's offer of support, claiming they "were never really friends in the first place". But after Cory pursues her into the co-ed bathroom (which he had previously been too terrified to enter), Angela confesses that she still has feelings for Shawn, pledging Cory to keep her secret between friends. Meanwhile, Eric encounters Mr. Feeny in his class – as a student. But the presentation that Feeny and Rachel make on "free will versus environment" convinces the Dean that Feeny can only function in his present environment as a professor. Special guest star: Bonnie Bartlett as Dean Guest stars: Sara Downing as Camryn, Christopher Marley as Guy Absent: Betsy Randle as Amy Matthews, Lindsay Ridgeway as Morgan Matthews, William Russ as Alan Matthews
118	5	"Better Than the Average Cory"	David Kendall	Patricia Carr & Lara Runnels	October 23, 1998	B768	11.67
After Cory is introduced to art prodigy Alexandra Nechita, he develops an inferiority complex, and blames his lack of skills on his "average" father. Meanwhile, Eric and Jack compete for Rachel's attention. Guest stars: Alexandra Nechita as herself, Jesse D. Goins as Mr. Cup
119	6	"Hogs and Kisses"	Jeff McCracken	David Brownfield	October 30, 1998	B771	11.72
After a director has Shawn and Topanga kiss while making a film, Cory, certain the duo has been secretly harboring romantic feelings for one another, directs them to go on a date, and explore their true emotions. Meanwhile, Eric and Jack pretend to be mannerly in front of Rachel. Guest stars: Tom Gallop as Simon, Brian Turk as Isaac Absent: William Daniels as George Feeny, Betsy Randle as Amy Matthews, Lindsay Ridgeway as Morgan Matthews, William Russ as Alan Matthews
120	7	"Everybody Loves Stuart"	William Russ	Matthew Nelson	November 6, 1998	B774	13.99
A popular new college professor named Stuart (played by Ben Savage's real life brother Fred Savage), is a favorite with his students because he "treats them as equals." But his true colors are revealed when he hits on Topanga in her dorm room. When Cory later strikes back – literally – on behalf of Topanga, Stuart tries to have him expelled from school, but is ultimately unsuccessful: Dean Bolander (who trusts Feeny’s judgments over his students) has Cory suspended for just one day and puts him under a probationary period for the rest of the term, and Stuart will be facing an investigation for his misconduct, endangering his teaching career. Special guest stars: Fred Savage as Stuart, Bonnie Bartlett as Dean Bolander Absent: Lindsay Ridgeway as Morgan Matthews
121	8	"You're Married, You're Dead"	Jeff McCracken	Gary H. Miller	November 13, 1998	B772	11.88
To prove he's still "one of the guys", despite being engaged, Cory goes to a bikini club with scantily-clad waitresses, where he loses his engagement ring, and desperately tries to keep Topanga from finding out. She, of course, does – and reminds Cory that wearing the ring in the first place was his idea, and that he remains free to do what he wants, but within reason. Meanwhile, Rachel, currently working on a term paper dealing with how women influence male bonding, observes Eric and Jack's off-the-wall behavior, with cool amusement. Guest stars: Shaun Weiss as Louie, Phil Buckman as Gambling Dan, Clare Salstrom as Joan, Adria Tennor as Teri, Dana Dewes as Eric's Waitress, Tami-Adrian George as Waitress Absent: William Daniels as Mr. George Feeny, Betsy Randle as Amy Matthews, Lindsay Ridgeway as Morgan Matthews, William Russ as Alan Matthews
122	9	"Poetic License: An Ode to Holden Caulfield"	William Russ	Erica Montolfo	November 20, 1998	B775	11.07
Cory reads Shawn's poems at the local coffee-house without realizing the truth behind what he is reading. Meanwhile, Eric, Jack, and Rachel try to cope with the stress of studying for exams. Guest stars: Alexandra Adi as Aubrey, Sebastian Tillinger as Dick, Camille Gaston as Poet, Bo Sharon as Student Absent: Betsy Randle as Amy Matthews, Lindsay Ridgeway as Morgan Matthews, William Russ as Alan Matthews
123	10	"And in Case I Don't See Ya..."	David Kendall	Barry Safchik	December 4, 1998	B773	9.25
In an effort to become more popular, Eric creates a TV show similar to The Truman Show, featuring his roommates, but it's Rachel who becomes "the campus darling". Meanwhile, Cory and Shawn expect special treatment from their "friend", Mr. Feeny. Guest stars: Shaun Weiss as Louie, Madison Eginton as Young Rachel Absent: Lindsay Ridgeway as Morgan Matthews
124	11	"Santa's Little Helpers"	Lynn McCracken	Patricia Carr & Lara Runnels	December 11, 1998	B776	11.90
Now that Cory and Topanga both know that Shawn and Angela still love each other, they have conflicting views on what to do about it – especially when, unbeknownst to each other, Cory invites Shawn to join their family Christmas, while Topanga invites Angela. Topanga wants to let well enough alone, but Cory misses no opportunity to bring his friends together, but the consequences are not exactly what he wants: after they finally kiss, Angela expresses her love for Shawn, but he protests that he is "not ready" to make the same commitment, and she storms off for good. Meanwhile, Eric takes his store Santa Claus job a little too seriously when he convinces Rachel and Jack to help him "steal" his family's gifts, in order to make under-privileged children happy. Guest stars: Dorien Wilson as Manager, Patrick Cranshaw as Custodian, JB Gaynor as Tommy, Jake Sakson as Edgar, Penny Bae Bridges as Lucy Note: This episode is titled "Santa's Little Helpers" and should not be confused with "Santa's Little Helper" from the first season.
125	12	"Cutting the Cord"	Kevin Tracy	Allison M. Gibson	January 8, 1999	B777	11.66
Shawn and Angela draw up a restraining order that forbids Cory and Topanga from any further interference in their romantic lives, but Shawn still has a difficult time seeing Angela date someone else – especially when they all wind up at the same restaurant together. While there, the couples enter a karaoke contest. Meanwhile, Alan has a midlife crisis, and tries to solve his problem by shopping for a motorcycle. Guest stars: Jeanne Jackson as Instructor, Kirsten Nelson as Jessica, Heather Marie Wayne as Kelly, Karim Prince as Ron Absent: William Daniels as George Feeny, Lindsay Ridgeway as Morgan Matthews
126	13	"We'll Have a Good Time Then..."	David Kendall	Gary H. Miller	January 22, 1999	B778	11.98
Shawn and Jack's ne'er-do-well father, Chet, re-appears on campus suddenly and, confronted by an angry Shawn, promises that he has come to stay and make amends with his sons for never being there for them. But, after treating them to a steak dinner, and consuming a piece of Rachel's "killer" chocolate cake, Chet suffers a heart attack. Shawn and Chet realize just how much they need each other, but by then it is too late. Shawn reveals that his anger at his father is partly fear that his own apparent inability to connect emotionally is inherited, and it appears a reconciliation might take place – then Chet has a second heart attack, and dies. Guest stars: Blake Clark as Chet Hunter, Julio Oscar Mechoso as Dr. Sanchez, Shannon Welles as Nurse, Christopher Carter as Kenny
127	14	"Getting Hitched"	Jeff McCracken	Jeff Menell	January 29, 1999	B779	11.94
Cory and Topanga play "The Fiancée Game" to prove how compatible they are, and are appalled when Eric and Rachel prove to know far more about each other than they do. Topanga suggests a quick solution: they should live together on campus, and really get to know each other. (Cory mistakenly thinks this means sex, and buys silk pajamas and sheets.) Living together shows them sides of each other that they're not too crazy about: for example, his big toe clipping flies across the room, and lodges in her already-applied facial cream. Meanwhile, Shawn has ignored Jack's repeated calls about clearing out Chet's trailer, and once persuaded, is freshly outraged to discover evidence that Chet went to Jack's stepfather for help in financing Shawn's college education. He decides to take the trailer "out on the open road", and convinces Cory to accompany him for the weekend, but oddly insists on saying goodbye to Topanga. Then, Jack, who has been struggling to contain his own grief in deference to Shawn's feelings, falls apart, and cries helplessly in Rachel's arms – and Eric walks in to find them kissing passionately. Guest star: Jeremy Seely as Student Absent: Betsy Randle as Amy Matthews, Lindsay Ridgeway as Morgan Matthews, Trina McGee-Davis as Angela Moore, William Russ as Alan Matthews
128	15	"Road Trip"	David Kendall	Matthew Nelson	February 5, 1999	B780	12.34
To take his mind off his dad's death, Shawn takes Cory along on a "soul-searching road trip" in Chet's trailer, where they end up at a truck stop, where the young waitresses (portrayed by the music group Nobody's Angel) are searching for something more, just like Shawn, and Cory discovers that Shawn has no intention of returning home. Shawn must persuade Cory to "let him go", just as the girls' father/boss must let them find their own way. Meanwhile, Eric tries to understand the kiss he witnessed between Jack and Rachel – as do they. Shawn discovers that his father, a truck-stop regular, was secretly very proud of him. In a surprise coda, Chet's ghost appears to Shawn, as father and son finally reconcile their differences, and Shawn drives off into his uncertain future. Guest stars: Blake Clark as Chet Hunter, Art LaFleur as Bill, Amy Sue Hardy as Amy Sue, Sarah Smith as Sarah, Stacey Harper as Stacey, Ali Navarro as Ali, Mickey Jones as Milkshake Guy Absent: William Daniels as George Feeny, Betsy Randle as Amy Matthews, Danielle Fishel as Topanga Lawrence, Lindsay Ridgeway as Morgan Matthews, Trina McGee-Davis as Angela Moore, William Russ as Alan Matthews
129	16	"My Baby Valentine"	David Kendall	Patricia Carr & Lara Runnels	February 12, 1999	B781	11.41
Cory becomes upset when Topanga seems less interested in spending Valentine's Day with him than with consoling Amy about the last stages of her pregnancy. So when Topanga decides to cheer Amy up with a baby shower, Cory takes charge. Unfortunately his concept of a baby shower turns out to be a female version of a bachelor party, complete with a pizza-guy stripper, but the disgusted guests are distracted when Amy's water breaks, and she is rushed to hospital for a premature delivery – one which the new baby may not survive. Meanwhile, Shawn is still "on the road to nowhere"; Morgan is less than happy about the arrival of a new sibling; and Jack and Rachel worry about the effects of revealing their new relationship to Eric – who announces that he already knows, and is moving out. Guest stars: McNally Sagal as Doctor, Brendan Wentworth as Pizza Guy, Gwen McGee as Nurse, Matt Kirkwood as Cowboy #1, Brian Peck as Cowboy #2
130	17	"Resurrection"	Jodi Binstock	Matthew Nelson	February 19, 1999	B782	11.73
While everyone anxiously awaits news about newly-born Joshua Gabriel, Cory's continued self-absorption alienates Topanga, who now considers herself to be a full-fledged member of the Matthews family. Cory tries to reconnect with the old "Weird" Topanga. This comes to life with the lip stick scene from season 1 episode 4 "Cory's Alternative Friends". Even Eric's little friend, Tommy, views Joshua as his new "brother". It's only when Shawn returns, and is accepted by the elder Matthews as "family", does Cory realize where his true values lie. Guest stars: McNally Sagal as Dr. Taylor, Michael Fairman as Dr. Markman, JB Gaynor as Tommy, Donna Ponterotto as Nurse, Susan Cremin as Karen, Clarence Barnes as Paul
131	18	"Can I Help to Cheer You?"	Jerry Levine	Barry Safchik	March 12, 1999	B784	12.02
Topanga is in "wedding-plan mode", and persuades (strong-arms) Cory into accompanying her, Shawn, and Angela to a posh ceremony in the hall of her dreams – where an unhappy father of the bride offers Cory $1 million to marry his daughter. Cory refuses at first, but then he sees the beautiful bride. His attraction to her, and daydream about her feeding him grapes on a deserted island wearing a sexy bikini, makes him question his love for Topanga. Meanwhile, Tommy pleads with a heartbroken Eric to adopt him, so that he would not have to move to California. This causes Eric to pretend that he no longer wants Tommy, so that Tommy can be happy with his new family. Guest stars: Richard Portnow as Stan, JB Gaynor as Tommy, Scott N. Stevens as Eddie, Nia Vardalos as Mrs. Gallagher, Marci Brickhouse as Jessie, Charles Stevenson, Jr. as Minister Absent: William Daniels as George Feeny, Lindsay Ridgeway as Morgan Matthews, Maitland Ward as Rachel McGuire, Matthew Lawrence as Jack Hunter
132	19	"Bee True"	Micky Dolenz	David Brownfield	April 9, 1999	B783	8.31
The series returns to form as Cory and Shawn unite for the last time as a "bad boy" team to help Mr. Feeny, whose hesitation in declaring his feelings for Dean Bolander looks like a fatal mistake when her ex-husband, Curtis Kinkade, returns from an expedition bent on winning her back. Shawn and Cory trash the interloper's lab, and blame it on a jealous rage by Feeny – who then saves Dean Bolander's life for real (and wins her heart) by swatting the rare bee brought back by Curtis, just before it stings her. She explains that she was not taken in for a moment by the boys' ruse – just impressed that Feeny's students care about him so much. Meanwhile, Rachel challenges Jack to take her out "on a real date". The only problem is that Jack is embarrassed that Rachel is taller than he is. Guest stars: Bonnie Bartlett as Dean Bolander, Francis X. McCarthy as Curtis Kinkade, Sandra Gould as Little Old Lady, Lillian Adams as Mrs. Furlong, Mildred Dumas as Mrs. Bertelson Absent: Betsy Randle as Amy Matthews, Lindsay Ridgeway as Morgan Matthews, William Russ as Alan Matthews
133	20	"The Truth About Honesty"	Jeff McCracken	Allison M. Gibson	April 30, 1999	B786	8.93
When Cory and Topanga make an agreement to tell the truth about everything and everyone, their "total-honesty" pact creates tension at Rachel and Jack's first dinner party. When the party guests play a game that forces them to also tell the truth, personal feelings are revealed that they would rather keep to themselves. As the episode comes to a close, Eric is telling his date a fake story of him taking a bullet for the President. He ends the story with the addition "I'm Batman." This statement is ironically true as Will Friedle was the voice of Terry McGinnis, the Batman in Batman Beyond. Guest star: Chad Morgan as Dana Note: This episode was held back from Disney Channel airings because of mature content. Absent: William Daniels as George Feeny, Lindsay Ridgeway as Morgan Matthews
134	21	"The Psychotic Episode"	William Russ	Carlos Aragon	May 7, 1999	B785	8.25
When Cory has nightmares, in which the recurring theme finds him trying to kill Shawn in imaginative ways, he goes to Feeny for an interpretation. Meanwhile, Eric finds a new, but odd, roommate – one who seems to have seen Psycho once too often. Guest stars: Linda Cardellini as Lauren, Charlie Newmark as Adam, Leslie Danon as Sheila Absent: William Russ as Alan Matthews
135	22	"State of the Unions"	Jeff McCracken	Barbara Feldman	May 14, 1999	B787	8.47
While Cory deals with his anxieties about his impending marriage, Topanga's parents (real-life couple Annette O'Toole and Michael McKean) come for a visit, and reveal some unexpected news: they are in the process of separating, which devastates Topanga. Meanwhile, Feeny and Dean Bolander (real-life husband and wife William Daniels and Bonnie Bartlett) announce their engagement, and they agree to get married in the Matthews' living room. Meanwhile, a self-pitying Eric asks Shawn for advice on how to cope with losing Rachel to Jack. Special guest stars: Bonnie Bartlett as Dean, Michael McKean as Jedediah Lawrence, Annette O'Toole as Rhiannon Lawrence Guest star: Earl Boen as Minister
