= Boy Meets World season 7 =

Boy Meets World
- Season 7
- Season 7 DVD cover
- Starring: Ben Savage; William Daniels; Betsy Randle; Will Friedle; Rider Strong; Danielle Fishel; Lindsay Ridgeway; Trina McGee-Davis; Maitland Ward; Matthew Lawrence; William Russ
- No. of episodes: 23

Release
- Original network: ABC
- Original release: September 24, 1999 – May 5, 2000

Season chronology
- ← Previous; Season 6

The seventh and final season of the television comedy series Boy Meets World aired between September 24, 1999 and May 5, 2000, on ABC in the United States. The season was produced by Michael Jacobs Productions and Touchstone Television with series creator Michael Jacobs as executive producer. It was broadcast as part of the ABC comedy block TGIF on Friday evenings.

The storyline of Cory, Topanga, Shawn, and Eric moving to New York, established in the series finale, continues on in the sequel series Girl Meets World (2014–2017) where Cory and Topanga are shown to be raising their two children, Riley (Rowan Blanchard) and Auggie (August Maturo). Riley is the series' protagonist, with Cory as a co-lead, and Topanga in a reduced role. Shawn and Eric appear in recurring guest roles, as do many other characters that have appeared over the course of Boy Meets World's run.

== Cast ==
- Ben Savage as Cory Matthews
- William Daniels as George Feeny (Note: Credited for the episodes that he/she did not appear in.)
- Betsy Randle as Amy Matthews
- Will Friedle as Eric Matthews
- Rider Strong as Shawn Hunter
- Danielle Fishel as Topanga Matthews (née Lawrence)
- Lindsay Ridgeway as Morgan Matthews
- Trina McGee-Davis as Angela Moore
- Maitland Ward as Rachel McGuire
- Matthew Lawrence as Jack Hunter
- William Russ as Alan Matthews

== Episodes ==
Boy Meets World Season 7 Episodes
No. overall	No. in season	Title	Directed by	Written by	Original release date	Prod. code	Viewers (millions)
136	1	"Show Me the Love (Part 1)"	David Kendall	Bob Tischler	September 24, 1999	B821	9.00
Continuing from where the last season finale ended, a distraught and emotionally rattled Topanga breaks up with Cory once again, calling off their wedding, too. Topanga explains to Cory that love is not enough to keep a relationship. Following her friend's lead, Angela decides that she can't be in a relationship with Shawn, and breaks up with him. Meanwhile, Jack asks Eric to move back into the apartment now that he and Rachel have also broken up. But another conundrum starts up when Rachel reveals that she has already asked Topanga and Angela to move in with her in the apartment. Rachel tells Topanga and Angela that they cannot move because Eric and Jack are moving back in. Feeling sympathy, Jack decides him and Eric will move out, but Eric does not agree, and decides to come up with a method in deciding who gets to keep the apartment. On the other hand, to make matters worse, Amy and Alan are also fighting as well because Alan does not want to let Morgan out on her first date. Then, Cory and Shawn decide to travel to Pittsburgh and try to convince Rhiannon and Jedidiah to get back together, hoping to convince Topanga that love still exists and to not give up on their relationship and put the wedding back on. To be continued... Guest star: Jacob Chase as Dominick
137	2	"For Love and Apartments (Part 2)"	David Kendall	Matthew Nelson	October 1, 1999	B822	7.99
Trying to go convince Topanga's parents, Rhiannon and Jedidiah, to get back together, Cory and Shawn venture to Pittsburgh in order to talk to them. Cory and Shawn meet with Rhiannon and tries to reason with her to get back together with her husband, Jedidiah. The two try to convince to see Jedidiah, but she refuses. Next, Cory and Shawn go to Jedidiah's apartment and attempt to convince him to meet with Rhiannon, and reconcile. He refuses at first, but they tell him that Rhiannon wants to see him. Cory and Shawn return to Rhiannon's house and tells her that Jedidiah wants to see her, too. Jedidiah arrives at Rhiannon's house and Cory and Shawn learn that the couple divorced because of Jedidiah's extramarital affair with a woman named Marie. They also learn that sometimes "love dies." Meanwhile, Rachel, Angela, and Topanga challenge Jack and Eric in a wrestling match to see which pair gets to keep the apartment. The girls get WWE's Mankind as the referee. The girls win handily, and Eric vows to get revenge on the girls, especially Topanga, for beating him up so easily during the match. Special guest stars: Marcia Cross as Rhiannon, Mankind as himself Guest star: Mark Harelik as Jedidiah Absent: Betsy Randle as Amy Matthews, Lindsay Ridgeway as Morgan Matthews, William Russ as Alan Matthews
138	3	"Angela's Men"	Jeff McCracken	Jeff Menell	October 8, 1999	B823	9.86
Angela, who has been mysteriously hesitant to get back together with Shawn, gets a surprise visit from her father, Sgt. Moore. Sgt. Moore puts Shawn to the test by putting him through various physical exercises, to see if he is worthy enough to stand his ground for Angela. Shawn gets on Sgt. Moore's good side and ends up impressing him with his constant persistence. Despite this, Angela makes it clear that she can't and won't get back together with Shawn, even if her father likes him. Shawn ends up joining the army, because he has no family. Angela reveals why she has been denying her feelings for Shawn, traumatized when her own mother abandoned her and her father during her childhood. Shawn and Angela grow even closer together, both bonding over their broken families. The two reconcile and get back together. Meanwhile, Cory keeps on following and attempting to convince Topanga to get back together and pursue their wedding. Eric is also trying to get his revenge on Topanga, still angry for her defeating him so easily during the wrestling match. But despite his many schemes, he has no avail on getting back at Topanga. Guest star: Julius Carry as Sgt. Moore Absent: Betsy Randle as Amy Matthews, Lindsay Ridgeway as Morgan Matthews, William Russ as Alan Matthews
139	4	"No Such Thing as a Sure Thing"	Jeff McCracken	Gary H. Miller	October 15, 1999	B824	8.71
The night before the big football game of Pennbrook and Amish, Eric makes Jack a bet, reliving his old gambling habit. Concern arises when it known that the school's mascot, Pengy the Pennbrook Penguin, turns out to be a spy for the rival school, Amish. Jack and Eric continue with their anticipation of the game, hoping to both win the bet. Meanwhile, Cory keeps trying to win back Topanga's affections, trying to make her feel better despite her parents now being divorced. As Cory tries to be affectionate and kiss Topanga, she pushes him away, which causes him to hit his head onto a brick wall. Fed up and angry, Cory gives up on trying to win back Topanga, and promises to live out his life without her. Later, Rhiannon and Jedidiah arrive to see Topanga, planning to tell them the reason for their divorce. Jedidiah reveals to Topanga about his affair with Marie, which causes her to angrily kick him out of her apartment. Rhiannon consoles her, while telling her that what happens between her and Jedidiah involves only them, and that Topanga shouldn't use what happened between her parents as a barometer to gauge what could happen between her and Cory. Topanga listens, and reconciles with Cory, putting the wedding back on and pursuing their relationship. Special guest star: Marcia Cross as Rhiannon Guest stars: Mark Harelik as Jedidiah, Grant Garrison as Jerry, Sasha Barrese as Jonina
140	5	"You Light Up My Union"	Kevin Tracy	Allison M. Gibson	October 22, 1999	B825	7.75
Thanks to Mr. Feeny's recommendation, Jack is made the new manager of the Student Union of Pennbrook, but is a bit annoyed that Eric was chosen to be his assistant manager. Jack reluctantly and worriedly asks Eric to deposit money in the bank. There, Eric meets an organ grinder with a pet monkey, who is also named Eric and learns that his pet monkey's girlfriend is in Milwaukee and he cannot afford to send for her. Eric gives the money to the organ grinder and is promised to be paid back. Jack finds out about the lost money, and belittles Eric. He takes Jack's words to heart and promises to be the most efficient person. Jack later loses money, too, and Eric becomes furious at Jack for being so harsh when he also made the same mistake. Jack finally realizes Mr. Feeny's idea for Jack to rub off of Eric, but he soon explains that his plan for them for rub off of each other. Meanwhile, Rachel starts to get annoyed because Shawn and Cory are always staying at her apartment, eating all of their food, go through her underwear drawer, read her diary, and come and go as they please, because Topanga gave them the key. Angela and Topanga disregard Rachel's complaints saying "they're just being cute." To get even, Rachel comes out of her bedroom wearing only her purple lingerie, which angers Topanga and Angela, because Cory and Shawn seem to care more about Rachel's sexy body than about them. The girls reconcile, with Topanga and Angela promising to not let their boyfriends come anytime they want. Guest stars: Jack Axelrod as Organ Grinder, Lou Felder as Bank Manager, Bill Stevenson as Loan Officer, Jennifer Griffin as the Woman Absent: Betsy Randle as Amy Matthews, Lindsay Ridgeway as Morgan Matthews, William Russ as Alan Matthews
141	6	"They're Killing Us"	William Russ	David Brownfield	October 29, 1999	B826	8.18
In a documentary styled episode, Cory and Topanga are struggling to plan the perfect wedding with so many things to consider. Cory has a problem choosing who should be his best man, his best friend, Shawn, or his unreliable annoying older brother, Eric. Eric is constantly annoying and asking Cory to make him the best man over Shawn. On the other hand, Topanga is having a hard time choosing her bridesmaids dresses. Morgan, Angela, and Rachel try them on, despite their hideous appearances. Angela and Rachel lie about loving the dresses, while Morgan lashes and destroys her dress in front of Topanga. Another problem is with Cory and Topanga planning their honeymoon; Topanga gets mad at Cory after all he cares about is consummation and sex. Later, Cory chooses Eric, but after several mistakes, fires him and chooses Shawn as his best man. Meanwhile, Amy gives Topanga an ancient wedding dress, which she hates. Attempting to fix their wedding, the couple hire Judy Haberfield, an annoying wedding planner. The couple has invited too many guests for a small hall. Amy and Alan give an idea that Mr. Feeny could be the one to perform the ceremony. Guest star: Meagen Fay as Judy Haberfield
142	7	"It's About Time"	Jerry Levine	Patricia Carr & Lara Runnels	November 5, 1999	B827	11.51
The day of Cory and Topanga's wedding day has arrived. Shawn, annoyed by Cory's bossy behavior, drops out being his best man and promises not to attend the wedding. Eric replaces Shawn as the best man but he sends the tuxedos, meant to have been sent with the limo to Matthews' residence, to the wedding instead, leaving Alan, Cory, Mr. Feeny, and Jack stranded in their tuxedos. Eric brings Cory to the Philadelphia Victorian Hotel, which starts to make Cory believe that Eric was a better best man than Shawn. Meanwhile, everyone is suspicious on how Eric had managed to move the wedding to such a fancy place. It is revealed that Eric had booked them illegally under the name Mr. Peterman. The wedding begins with Jedidiah walking Topanga down the aisle, Cory and Topanga exchanging vows. The minister refers to Cory and Topanga as "Mr. and Mrs. Peterman," confirming everyone's suspicions. Meanwhile, Eric remembers that he has forgotten the wedding rings. Just in time, Shawn arrives delivering the rings. After fighting with Cory for exploding at him and calling him "trailer trash", Shawn reveals his reason for such outrage, fearing that he and Cory will no longer be friends after he marries Topanga. However, Cory angrily screams back at Shawn that he himself does not want to talk about it. The two, now devastated, reconcile, and the wedding proceeds. Eric gives the newlyweds a key to the grandest suite in the hotel. Cory and Topanga leave the wedding, rushing to their honeymoon suite. Special guest star: Marcia Cross as Rhiannon Guest stars: Mark Harelik as Jedediah, Willie Garson as the minister
143	8	"The Honeymooners"	William Russ	Barbie Feldman	November 12, 1999	B828	12.01
After Eric's stunt at the hotel gets him, Cory, and Topanga arrested he attempts to make it up to them. He continuously follows and stalks them during their honeymoon in Hawaii. Topanga meets an elderly woman named Mrs. Nelson who is celebrating her 50th wedding anniversary with her husband. Mrs. Nelson tells Topanga that she and her husband plan to live out their lives in paradise. Later, Cory meets Mrs. Nelson's husband, Mr. Nelson, who tells Cory the exact same thing. Cory and Topanga contemplate their plans never returning to Philadelphia and live out their lives in Hawaii, like the Nelson couple. However, their dreams soon seem to fade when Topanga realizes that they cannot make a living. Cory goes to sleep and dreams of him and Topanga opening up a coconut shop and making a living. Cory comes to his senses and he and Topanga come to a decision to return to Philadelphia. The couple realize that family and friends are more important than living in paradise and return home. Cory and Topanga meet up at the Matthews' residence telling their family about their experience. Meanwhile, Eric is left in Hawaii, not knowing that Cory and Topanga have already returned to Philadelphia. Guest stars: Anne Haney as Mrs. Nelson, John Ingle as Mr. Nelson Absent: Maitland Ward as Rachel McGuire, Matthew Lawrence as Jack Hunter
144	9	"The Honeymoon Is Over"	Jodi Binstock	Barry Safchik	November 19, 1999	B829	11.50
The honeymoon is over for newlyweds Cory and Topanga as the return home. The couple return to Topanga's apartment with Rachel and Angela, only to find out that Angela has already asked Shawn to move in. Shawn moves Topanga's stuff out leaving Cory and Topanga homeless. Cory and Topanga move to their next option - to his parents’ house. The newlyweds attempt to move in for the meantime with Alan and Amy. Amy is considerate and wants Cory and Topanga to move in, but Alan is reluctant about it and refuses. Alan eventually convinces Amy not to let them move in, and she eventually agrees (though very angry with Alan). Cory attempts again later in the episode only for Alan to tell him that he needs to deal with his own life. Amy (shown sitting in the stairwell) is still very angry at her husband for not allowing her son and daughter-in-law to move in. The couple goes back to their college dorm rooms at Pennbrook only to find out that Jack and Eric have reported them to Dean Bolander and tell her that they've been married. Jack shows them clear rules stating married couples only can live with each other in a married couple dorm room. The couple move into the dorm room reserved for married couples. Unfortunately, the room is deteriorating, filthy, and has many appliance problems. Guest star: Marisol Nichols as Kelly Absent: Lindsay Ridgeway as Morgan Matthews
145	10	"Picket Fences"	Jerry Levine	Erica Montolfo	November 21, 1999	B830	10.10
Newlywed couple Cory and Topanga Matthews continue to look for a place to live. The couple have gotten on their friends' last nerves, including Shawn and Angela after spending all of their time at their apartment. Fed up, Shawn and Angela kick Cory and Topanga out. Meanwhile, Cory, who is still house-hunting for a better living situation, meets a realtor named Mrs. Stevens. The house that she has shown him is equivalent to their dream home. Cory brings Topanga to the house, and she gets convinced, too. Cory and Topanga go to the Matthews' house and try to convince Amy and Alan to sign the forms needed for them to live in their dream home. Alan refuses after reading the contract which states if they cannot pay the house, the Matthews' residence will be claimed. Amy and Alan refuse, leaving Cory and Topanga heartbroken. The newlyweds return to their dorm room, and Cory fixes up the pipes giving clean, and safe, drinking water. Cory and Topanga, proud of their accomplishment, go to the Matthews' residence to show Amy and Alan their accomplishment. Cory and Topanga learn the reason why Amy and Alan didn't help them - to give them a chance to bond, the same way they did when they first married. Meanwhile, Angela and Rachel play roommate shuffle once again, while Eric and Jack get a new boss at the student union. Guest stars: Marisol Nichols as Kelly, Nicole Eggert as Bridget, Jo Anne Worley as Mrs. Stevens Absent: William Daniels as George Feeny, Lindsay Ridgeway as Morgan Matthews
146	11	"What a Drag!"	Jodi Binstock	Carlos Aragon	December 3, 1999	B831	8.41
After Jack and Eric rat out a campus goon before he commits a crime, the cops are forced to let him go because the crime was not committed. After this, he vows to get revenge on Jack and Eric for ratting him out. Fearful, Eric disguises himself as an ugly woman, and eventually convinces Jack to do the same in order to protect themselves. Eric is ugly, but Jack is found attractive by many men including the campus goon that they've ratted out. The goon, Luther, hits on Jack, but is completely oblivious to Eric. Luther tries to kiss Jack, but Jack tells him to close his eyes. Jack takes off his wig and Eric takes a picture. Jack and Eric reveal themselves to Luther, who vows to make them suffer. He reaches inside Jack's "breasts" and Eric snaps another photo. The pair blackmail Luther into leaving them alone, otherwise face embarrassment once they reveal those photos to the whole university. Meanwhile, Topanga is struggling to accept Cory's re-decorating for their dorm room after he paints the whole room yellow after buying every ounce of yellow paint from the closing store "Cork World." Cory re-decorates the room after he finds out that Topanga thinks its terrible. Cory and Topanga promise to never keep secrets from each other and promise to tell each other everything, although it may hurt. Guest stars: Andrew Levitas as Luther, Blake C. Shields as Tony Absent: Betsy Randle as Amy Matthews, Lindsay Ridgeway as Morgan Matthews, Trina McGee-Davis as Angela Moore, Maitland Ward as Rachel McGuire, William Russ as Alan Matthews
147	12	"Family Trees"	Fred Savage	Matthew Nelson	December 17, 1999	B833	7.28
With Cory, Amy, and Morgan stressed out over the annual stress of planning Alan's birthday party, Eric takes over and decides to plan Alan's party. Shawn later arrives at the Matthews' residence together with a letter that he received from his mother, Virna, who ran away three years prior. Cory is reluctant to let Shawn open Virna's letter, but he does so anyway, and finds out that Virna is not his biological mother. Desperate for a family, Shawn and Jack search for his mother and come across a woman named Elaine, whom like Virna, doesn't want to be found. Hurt about this, Shawn pushes his friends away. Meanwhile, Alan is sulking due to no one remembering nor celebrating his birthday. The entire family, including Angela, Rachel, and Jack, surprise him, along with Eric, whom Amy planned to use as bait to lure Alan. After the surprise, Shawn arrives drunk; Alan attempts to talk to him and promises to be his father. Alan and Amy tell Shawn they plan to adopt him and make him an official members of the Matthews family. After hearing this, Shawn walks away and Cory chases him. Later, Shawn goes to the cemetery and talks to his late father, Chet. Chet's ghost advises him to take Amy and Alan's offer and to become a Matthews. Chet reveals that Shawn's biological mother was a stripper, who took off shortly after his birth. Chet reassures Shawn that Chet was the reason for why Shawn's biological mother and Virna's departed from their lives. Shawn reconciles with Chet telling him that he loved him and was an amazing father. Shawn returns to Matthews' house and apologizes for ruining Alan's birthday party. He also tells Amy and Alan that he cannot accept their offer to become a Matthews; but he is always going to be a member of their family. Shawn gives Alan a birthday present with his fingerprints, also thanking Alan for being a father-figure to him. Shawn asks a request to Alan - to yell at him and treat him like the way he treats Eric and Cory. Alan does so, making Shawn feel that he is really a Matthews. Guest stars: Blake Clark as Chet Hunter, Jeff Menell as Santa Absent: William Daniels as George Feeny
148	13	"The Provider"	Lynn McCracken	Jeff Menell	January 7, 2000	B832	9.19
Cory is enthusiastic about his new job, but his enthusiasm quickly deflates after Topanga announces that she, too, got a job that is better that Cory's mediocre job. As Cory attempts to sell magazines for his job, but has no avail, Topanga steps in to assist, and immediately sells eight magazines. She receives a phone call from her boss who informs her that she has got a job promotion. Things become even worse when Cory is struggling to play a game of cards, and Topanga interferes and immediately wins. Having the last straw, Cory tells Topanga his real feelings on how she's killed his spirit and also how she always rubs her more better accomplishments in his face. Cory returns to their dormitory, while their fight resumes. Topanga wants to make her first fight with Cory a meaningful one. Cory explains to Topanga his fear to talking and also tells his real feelings about her gloating about her more successful career. Cory and Topanga reconcile, and sell magazines, this time as a team, because they work better as a team, better than they do individually. Meanwhile, Eric is overjoyed when he finds a penny and thinks it's a lucky one. Guest star: Brandon Molale as Rocco Absent: William Daniels as George Feeny, Betsy Randle as Amy Matthews, Lindsay Ridgeway as Morgan Matthews, William Russ as Alan Matthews
149	14	"I'm Gonna Be Like You, Dad"	Kevin Tracy	Gary H. Miller	January 28, 2000	B834	9.60
With Eric announcing to Amy and Alan that he plans to work with his father, Alan is reluctant and concerned about it. He refuses to let Eric to work for him; Amy eventually convinces him otherwise. The next day, Alan's point of view of Eric changes after his amazing performance at work. Alan is relieved that Eric has done so well and will not have to go into the real world and get disappointed. Amy and Feeny aren't as enthusiastic, however, which becomes even worse when Alan presents a new sign for the store that says "Matthews and Son." Later on, Rachel and Jack tell Alan how lucky Eric is to have his future set, as opposed to them being confused and worried. Despite that, Alan still has no faith in Eric. Meanwhile, Cory and Topanga take a couple's quiz from a magazine which tells Cory that he should've died a week ago. Cory pretends he can't feel his legs but Topanga refuses to pay attention to him. Cory visits a doctor who questions his sex life and sexuality. He receives his results which reveal that he tested positive for hypochondria. Cory believes that hypochondria is a severe illness and that placebo pills will save his life. Later, Alan talks to Eric about his future and reminds him about his dreams to become a weatherman. He encourages Eric to join Jack and Rachel, telling him to be with his friends. Guest stars: Ted Kairys as Dr. Feldspar, Ralph Manza as Uncle Morrie Absent: Lindsay Ridgeway as Morgan Matthews
150	15	"The War (Part 1)"	William Russ	Allison M. Gibson	February 11, 2000	B835	9.74
Rachel, who is annoyed at Cory and Shawn for constantly being at their apartment, gets even more infuriated after she finds out that Shawn had parked in her parking spot. Fed up with their attitudes, Rachel kicks them out and bans them from the dormitory. To get even, Cory and Shawn put Rachel's car in her dorm room; Rachel tries to get them into trouble by using Mr. Feeny, but he decides to side with them instead of her. Rachel and Angela declare an all-out-war; Topanga joins Cory and Shawn's side, while Jack joins Rachel and Angela's side. For her first prank, Rachel glues Cory, Topanga, and Shawn to their seats and pours a bucket of honey on them. Eric, worried, attempts to end the war fearing that it would escalate too far. In order to retaliate against Rachel's team, Cory and Shawn post a revealing photo of Rachel in the Student Union. Hurt and humiliated, Rachel blames Angela, who blames Shawn. Shawn reveals that he took the photo, and Jack was the one who showed it to him because he showed Jack a picture of Angela. Topanga later arrives and is angry because Cory and Shawn excluded her once again. Cory offends Rachel after accidentally saying that Topanga has known her a couple of years versus knowing them her whole life. Jack and Angela are furious after finally realizing how the teams were picked - life-long friends versus newly befriended roommates. Meanwhile, Eric attempts to fix the rift among the friends, but gets his feelings hurt after Jack tells him the truth that neither team wanted him. Absent: Betsy Randle as Amy Matthews, Lindsay Ridgeway as Morgan Matthews, William Russ as Alan Matthews
151	16	"Seven the Hard Way (Part 2)"	William Russ	David Brownfield	February 11, 2000	B836	9.74
To fix the rift among the gang, Mr. Feeny and Eric lock the gang in a classroom hoping for them to reconcile. Rachel is feeling betrayed by everyone, Topanga feels like Shawn is more important to Cory than she is, Angela feels betrayed by Shawn, and Jack feels like those who've been friends for less time aren't as important. Rachel walks out; Feeny gives up on them reconciling. Time passes, things and people have changed. Seven years into the future, the gang reunites for Mr. Feeny's retirement party. Cory and Topanga arrive, but aren't happy. The couple meet Angela, exchanging an awkward conversation. Cory sees Jack, who has become wealthy and successful; Jack is completely uninterested and oblivious towards Cory. Shawn arrives, feeling lonely, with no friends or girlfriend. Rachel arrives, and reveals that she has moved back to Texas and married her ex-boyfriend but eventually divorced him. She is surprised that the group didn't remain friends after her departure. Finally, Eric arrives and has an encounter with Jack. Eric is now a lonely hermit who lives in seclusion in the mountains. Eric shows the gang his manifesto which in the first page reads, "Lose one friend, lose all friends, lose yourself." The scene shifts back to the present, only with a twist. Feeny keeps everyone locked in the classroom while Eric chases after Rachel. Eric reads his quote. The gang is moved and decide to resolve their differences. Absent: Betsy Randle as Amy Matthews, Lindsay Ridgeway as Morgan Matthews, William Russ as Alan Matthews
152	17	"She's Having My Baby Back Ribs"	Jerry Levine	Patricia Carr & Lara Runnels	March 3, 2000	B837	9.02
Topanga feels ashamed of herself after Jack brags about his 6% body fat, and also noticing how gorgeous Angela and Rachel are. Eric, on the other hand, is also struggling with his weight, and Topanga sees this. Eric and Topanga swear, secretly, to each other to diet. Her diet starts effective immediately; the next morning she refuses to eat her usual breakfast waffles with Cory, and doesn't fit into her pants. Cory asks for Shawn's assistance; the two come to the conclusion that Topanga is pregnant. However, Shawn advises Cory to talk to Topanga. Cory's suspicions grow as he returns to the Student Union and sees Eric rubbing Topanga's stomach. He hears Eric telling Topanga that "it'll only be a few months." Cory is finally convinced that Topanga is pregnant and decides to confide in his parents and Mr. Feeny. The three promise to be supportive of Cory and Topanga's decision. Later, Angela brings Topanga to her surprise baby shower and continuously compliments her about her looks. Topanga realizes what is going on and confides in Angela that she is not pregnant. Despite this, Topanga enters the party and is showered with gifts. Cory's grandmother, Nana Boo Boo (Amy's mother), arrives and gives Cory and Topanga $75,000 to start a family. Upon Angela's urging to her, Topanga reveals the truth that she is not pregnant and that in fact her and Eric are dieting to lose weight. Eric also reveals that he called Topanga fat to eat her pizza. The gang tells each other their problems about their appearance; Rachel isn't confident about her height, Angela wants to have Topanga's curve, Shawn has no butt, and even Jack, together with his 6% body fat, used to be called "Jumbo Jack" when he was in high school. That night, Cory feels sad about not having a baby, but realizes that they're not ready to have a child, yet. Cory and Topanga look forward to the future and imagine having a child. Upon realizing that they can still practice having babies, the two slip under the covers and make love. Guest star: Peggy Miley as Nana Boo Boo Note: This is the last time in the series that the entire main cast is present.
153	18	"How Cory and Topanga Got Their Groove Back"	Lynn McCracken	Barbie Feldman	March 17, 2000	B838	8.07
While Cory and Topanga are excited for their favorite investigative show, 60 Minutes and 20/20, while all of their other friends are going out partying. Shawn unintentionally insults Topanga after he says that partying is not their thing. Topanga takes that insult to heart and vows to Cory that just because they are married, does not mean that they are boring. Cory doesn't wholeheartedly support Topanga's idea to prove that they're not boring but goes along with her plan just to please her. Cory plans to throw a "fun" party the next night to prove to their classmates and friends that they're fun. However, people are unimpressed after the couple put signs outside the door reading "No parents allowed" and "8:00-?," which also scares people off. Cory and Topanga hand out flyers around the Student Union. Unfortunately, Angela and Rachel reveal that Cory and Topanga's party is the same day as Jerry Dervin's party, one of the most highly anticipated parties of the year. Shawn shows disinterest in the couple's party; Cory forbids him (and also everyone else) from coming to their party and takes back all of the flyers. As the time of their party nears, Cory and Topanga are highly anticipating guests. Topanga cooks quiche, Cory puts out games like Clue, he also picks childish dance music. Cory and Topanga get into a fight and start throwing food at each other, and also all over the room. Later, Rachel, Angela, and Shawn arrive, pondering on whether they should enter the "party." They open the door, and see food everywhere and also notice Cory and Topanga on the floor making out, talking about their disbelief that no one showed up at their party. Meanwhile, Eric gets a bump on the head and gives him the ability to tell the future. Jack is skeptical at first, but is convinced once Eric sneezes the numbers of the lotto. However, Eric refuses to sneeze the remaining numbers, foreseeing trouble somewhere far away, dragging Jack to a spot. Unfortunately, Eric brings Jack to the side of an alley. Frustrated, Jack hits Eric's head onto the dumpster. Jack buys a ticket, but when, that night, the numbers are read on TV, and Eric's numbers are incorrect which causes Jack to rip apart the lotto ticket. The next lotto winning is read and it turns out that Eric's number were correct. In disbelief, Jack is crushed after having torn up the lotto. Absent: William Daniels as George Feeny, Betsy Randle as Amy Matthews, Lindsay Ridgeway as Morgan Matthews, William Russ as Alan Matthews
154	19	"Brotherly Shove"	Jerry Levine	Matthew Nelson	March 31, 2000	B839	7.37
While on vacation, Amy and Alan order Cory and Eric to clean out the garage. However, Cory decides to clean out the garage with Shawn and Topanga instead. However, Eric arrives and is heartbroken because Alan had asked them to clean out the garage together, and feels that Shawn and Topanga are more important to Cory than he is. Cory attempts to apologize to Eric but, unfortunately, he rebuffs Cory's attempts to make amends. Eric makes a suggestion to have a garage sale and split the money. The next day, Cory and Eric prepare for the Matthews' garage sale. Cory attempts to remember the happy memories with Eric, but Eric decides to sell all of their items at extremely low prices. Meanwhile, because of their bonding time together, Cory and Eric inspire Shawn and Jack to spend more time together and be more "brotherly." However, Shawn and Jack find out that they have nothing in common, and are extremely bored with each other's company. While at the sale, Cory begs Eric to talk to him, while a woman annoys and pesters Cory about a price. Eric continues to ignore Cory's attempts, and his frustration leads him to snap and insult the female customer. Her husband doesn't appreciate this and punches Cory in the face. Eric retaliates and defends his brother by punching the man all over his body and face. This leads to a huge fist fight at the garage sale. Later, while waiting in the hospital, Cory has a heart-to-heart talk with Eric and thanks him for defending him. Eric is still infuriated and says that they're brother, and not friends. While Cory is packing in the Matthews' garage, Topanga tells him of how Cory used to love spending time with Eric. Cory finally understands; Topanga tells him that he has time to make more memories living out his life before leaving. Eric, who arrives in the garage, helps Cory pack up the stuff. Meanwhile, Rachel forces Angela to do spring cleaning. Absent: William Daniels as George Feeny, Betsy Randle as Amy Matthews, Lindsay Ridgeway as Morgan Matthews, William Russ as Alan Matthews
155	20	"As Time Goes By"	Steve Hoefer	Erica Montolfo	April 7, 2000	B840	6.33
Cory and Topanga get into a fight due to Topanga's constant studying. Cory attempts to get Topanga to let loose and enjoy herself, even just for a few minutes. Topanga compromises and decides to clean in order for her to "enjoy herself." While cleaning the closet, Topanga discovers a time-continuum vortex and accidentally climbs and falls into it. As a result of this, she enters a detective noir world which involves the counterparts of the main characters (except Morgan). Topanga exits the vortex through a telephone box and enters into a 1940s world. She is also suffering from amnesia and cannot remember her identity of where she is from. Topanga hires Gumshoe, an alternate personality of Eric, to find out her identity. However, she enters Rory's Shangri-La-Café and discovers its care-free atmosphere. Topanga adopts the name Trixie, and becomes a waitress at the café, while also attracting the interest of the owner, Rory, an alternative personality of Cory. Later, Gumshoe speaks to Trixie, but she forgets why she had hired him in the first place. Gumshoe questions Trixie about her knowledge about the "time-continuum vortex," causing her to have a short flashback but, unfortunately, she remembers nothing specific. Because of the flashback, her annoyingly realistic personality returns which causes the frivolous care-free world of Rory's Shangri-La-Café into despair. Fez-Head, the counterpart personality of Feeny, starts an angry mob by saying "The interloper must die!" Everyone agrees and starts chanting "Die!" Gumshoe decides to do something and wanders into the telephone box which causes him to get transported to Cory and Topanga's apartment in Pennbrook. Cory mistakes Gumshoe for Eric; Gumshoe leads Cory into the vortex and they enter the 1940s world. Cory and Gumshoe find Trixie's lifeless body lying on the ground which everyone from Rory's Shangri-La-Café surrounding her. Cory wants to find an answer for the cause of Topanga's (Trixie) death, and is confronted by Rory, Cory's counterpart personality. Cory accuses Rory of Topanga's death, but Cory says that the difference between their personalities is that he never acts of malicious thoughts. Despaired, Cory leans down to Topanga and tells her to get up but, she says that she is dead. Gumshoe reveals that once the world melts away, Topanga would wake up. Back in the present, Topanga wakes up, having fallen asleep studying. Cory hears her move and decides to study with her. Topanga insists that they watch cartoons together. Note: Cory and Topanga are the only characters that appear in their original characters, and also their alternate personalities, while the remainder of the cast are only present in their counterpart personalities. Absent: Lindsay Ridgeway as Morgan Matthews
156	21	"Angela's Ashes"	Fred Savage	Carlos Aragon	April 28, 2000	B841	6.52
Shawn is excited when Angela's military father, Sgt. Alvin Moore, comes to visit his daughter, Angela. Shawn's happiness is destroyed and crumbled once Sgt. Moore confides in him about his reassignment to Europe and also his plans to take Angela with him in order to form a better relationship with his daughter. Shawn intends to let Angela go to Europe with her father because he knows that it will make Angela happy and it has always been her dream to be together with her father. Shawn tells Cory who tells him not to let Angela go to Europe, as she is the most important person in his life. Cory advises him to have faith that Angela will choose to stay with Shawn, rather than go with her father. Angela tells Shawn that she will stay with him, unless he gives her permission to go. Shawn thinks of Angela's feelings, says he can go, much to the detriment of Cory which causes him to rethink his decision. Rethinking his decision, Shawn confronts Angela and Sgt. Moore, intending to take responsibility for Angela by marrying her and making her stay in Philadelphia. But, just before he is able to say it, Angela thanks Shawn for his understanding and, consequently, he kisses her goodbye as she departs. Meanwhile, Jack is devastated and angry after his rich, affluent, and wealthy stepfather (his mother's second husband) cuts him off after his proposed "business" venture, a website titled ImJack.com. His stepfather thinks that the website is useless and makes no sense. Rachel helps Jack by teaching him to how to change her lifestyle but, unfortunately, he shows little willingness to do so. On the other hand, Topanga tries out for a Brown-Elliot internship in New York City, Manhattan, but Cory did not notice as he was too busy helping Shawn about his problems with Angela. Topanga informs Cory that she was accepted and they will have to move to New York as a result. After hearing this, Cory begins to spin out of control and panic. Guest star: Julius Carry as Sgt. Moore Absent: William Daniels as George Feeny, Betsy Randle as Amy Matthews, Lindsay Ridgeway as Morgan Matthews, William Russ as Alan Matthews
157	22	"Brave New World (Part 1)"	Jeff McCracken	Matthew Nelson	May 5, 2000	B842	10.02
Cory is constantly pondering on whether he and Topanga should move to New York. While pondering on this, he has several flashbacks from their youth including the time when she pushed him against the lockers and kissed him. Also, Jack, who has been struggling with his stepfather not giving money, decides to join the Peace Corps. Topanga later arrives and tells Cory that she will not pursue the internship and that they should remain in Philadelphia because that is their hometown and also where their friends and family are. This makes Cory very happy, as he does not want to move to another state, nevertheless, leave his family and friends. However, Shawn bursts his bubble after informing him that Topanga was bluffing and that their relocation to New York will happen. Later, Eric goes to Mr. Feeny's house and tells him that he will also think about him even though they might not be together and near each other much longer. While doing this, he also does the famous "Feeny Call," and because of the happenings, Feeny admits to loving the call. Eric seeks that Mr. Feeny will help Cory understand change. Cory confides into Mr. Feeny that he feels Topanga turned down the Brown-Elliot internship because of him. Mr. Feeny tells Cory that maybe Topanga didn't turn down the internship because of him. Unbeknownst to Cory, Topanga and Mr. Feeny already had a talk, prior to their current conversation. Feeny tells Cory not to stop Topanga from thriving because, if he does this, she might stop growing as a person. Cory listens to Feeny's advice and decides to go to New York with Topanga. After their talk, Topanga reveals to Cory about her fear of failing. Cory ensures that if she does fail, he will love her even more because he saw women who went out into the world and took a gamble. Amy, who is not supportive of their idea to move, is panicking about their plan. However, her worries soon fade after Alan tells her that Eric plans to move with them, too. Meanwhile, Rachel reveals to Jack about her plans to join the Peace Corps with him. While at the Matthews' residence, Eric decides to get a fresh start. Topanga tells him not to change and that she loves her for who he is. Eric bids goodbye to Jack and Rachel. Minutes before their departure, Topanga decides to tell Cory and Shawn that Shawn is coming with them to New York. Rejoiced, Cory and Shawn start jumping and celebrating. To be continued... Special guest stars: Anthony Tyler Quinn as Mr. Turner, Alex Désert as Eli Williams Guest stars: Blake Clark as Chet, Julius Carry as Sgt. Moore, Julio Oscar Mechoso as Dr. Sanchez Absent: Trina McGee-Davis as Angela Moore
158	23	"Brave New World (Part 2)"	Jeff McCracken	Matthew Nelson	May 5, 2000	B842	10.02
In the series finale, Eric bids his goodbye to Amy and Alan. While doing this, he has several flashbacks from previous seasons and also from previous episodes which features their father-son-relationship. Eric remembers his memories with Amy, which also come from previous season and episodes. Amy reminds Cory not to get Topanga pregnant until they can stand alone on their feet. Shawn thanks Jack for helping him get through Chet's death stating that he never would have gotten through it without him. Chet, who appear in spirit, reminds his sons that he will always be there with them no matter despite him not physically being there. Jack tells Rachel to save a seat for him on the boat that she's riding, and that he is also giving up his wealthy stepfather's money, much to Chet's dismay. Jack and Rachel confirm that they will go to the Peace Corps, together, and that'll they'll always be there for each other. Finally, Cory's little brother, Joshua, bids goodbye. Cory gives Joshua advice and says that he will be part of the world, someday, and that he will also learn from the world, make mistakes in it, make amazing friends, and jokes that Feeny will probably be his teacher every grade. After giving Joshua his advice, Cory finally understands that he has met the world, saying "Boy Meets World. Now I get it." Eric, Shawn, and Topanga go to the car while Cory says his final farewells to Alan, Amy, and Morgan. Cory makes Morgan promise that she will take care of Amy and Alan. Finally, Mr. Feeny returns to his sixth grade classroom and is greeted by his favorite students - Cory, Shawn, Topanga, and Eric. The four go ask Mr. Feeny for his advice, but he says that he has taught them everything that they know, that they should believe in themselves, and they will shine in the world. Eric demands that Mr. Feeny tell the group that he loves them. However, he refuses, saying that he loves all of his students equally. Topanga embraces Feeny thanking him for everything that he has ever taught to him and also for being a father-figure to her. She also comments that he was more of a father to her than Jedidiah was. Next, Shawn thanks Mr. Feeny for never giving-up on him despite his many shenanigans, tells him that he will never forget him, and that he is also the best person that he knows. Eric assures Mr. Feeny that he will be a good person because of what he has taught him throughout his lifetime. Finally, Mr. Feeny jokes with Cory revealing that he knows him so well that he knows his real name - "Cornelius." Cory tells Mr. Feeny, despite him not going to New York with them, he will always be with each one of them because of all the lessons that he has taught them. After they leave, Mr. Feeny says "I love you all. Class dismissed." Special guest stars: Anthony Tyler Quinn as Mr. Turner, Alex Désert as Eli Williams Guest stars: Blake Clark as Chet, Julius Carry as Sgt. Moore, Julio Oscar Mechoso as Dr. Sanchez Absent: Trina McGee-Davis as Angela Moore
