= List of Boy Meets World episodes =

The episode list of the ABC sitcom Boy Meets World. The series ran from September 24, 1993, to May 5, 2000, with 158 episodes produced, spanning 7 seasons.

== Series overview ==
Season	Episodes	Originally released		Viewers (millions)	Rank
Season	Episodes	First released	Last released	Viewers (millions)	Rank
1	22	September 24, 1993	May 13, 1994	8.5	#37
2	23	September 23, 1994	May 19, 1995	11.5	#36
3	22	September 22, 1995	May 17, 1996	10.1	#48
4	22	September 20, 1996	May 2, 1997	8.7	#51
5	24	October 3, 1997	May 15, 1998	11.6	#55
6	22	September 25, 1998	May 14, 1999	10.9	#58
7	23	September 24, 1999	May 5, 2000	8.7	#73

== Episodes ==
=== Season 1 (1993–94) ===
Boy Meets World Season 1 episodes
No. overall	No. in season	Title	Directed by	Written by	Original release date	Prod. code	Viewers (millions)
1	1	"Pilot"	John Tracy	Michael Jacobs & April Kelly	September 24, 1993	B601	16.5
2	2	"On the Fence"	David Trainer	Jeff C. Sherman	October 1, 1993	B603	19.2
3	3	"Father Knows Less"	David Trainer	April Kelly	October 8, 1993	B604	18.5
4	4	"Cory's Alternative Friends"	David Trainer	Patricia Forrester	October 15, 1993	B606	20.4
5	5	"Killer Bees"	David Trainer	Susan Estelle Jansen	October 22, 1993	B602	17.1
6	6	"Boys II Mensa"	David Trainer	Janette Kotichas Burleigh	October 29, 1993	B607	21.3
7	7	"Grandma Was a Rolling Stone"	David Trainer	Ed Decter & John J. Strauss	November 12, 1993	B609	22.0
8	8	"Teacher's Bet"	David Trainer	April Kelly	November 19, 1993	B610	21.2
9	9	"Class Pre-Union"	David Trainer	Ed Decter & John J. Strauss	November 26, 1993	B611	15.8
10	10	"Santa's Little Helper"	David Trainer	Susan Estelle Jansen	December 10, 1993	B612	18.1
11	11	"The Father/Son Game"	David Trainer	Bill Lawrence	December 17, 1993	B608	19.0
12	12	"Once in Love with Amy"	David Trainer	Ken Kuta	January 7, 1994	B613	24.1
13	13	"She Loves Me, She Loves Me Not"	David Trainer	April Kelly	January 14, 1994	B614	23.9
14	14	"The B-Team of Life"	David Trainer	Jeff Menell	January 28, 1994	B605	21.0
15	15	"Model Family"	David Trainer	Ed Decter & John J. Strauss	February 4, 1994	B615	21.4
16	16	"Risky Business"	David Trainer	Ken Kuta	February 11, 1994	B617	22.7
17	17	"The Fugitive"	David Trainer	Jeff C. Sherman	February 25, 1994	B618	14.9
18	18	"It's a Wonderful Night"	David Trainer	Susan Estelle Jansen	March 11, 1994	B616	19.3
19	19	"Kid Gloves"	David Trainer	Jeff Menell	March 25, 1994	B620	20.1
20	20	"The Play's the Thing"	David Trainer	Ed Decter & John J. Strauss	April 29, 1994	B621	16.2
21	21	"Boy Meets Girl"	David Trainer	Janette Kotichas Burleigh	May 6, 1994	B622	16.2
22	22	"I Dream of Feeny"	David Trainer	Mark Fink	May 13, 1994	B619	16.3

=== Season 2 (1994–95) ===
Boy Meets World Season 2 Episodes
No. overall	No. in season	Title	Directed by	Written by	Original release date	Prod. code	Viewers (millions)
23	1	"Back 2 School"	David Trainer	David Kendall	September 23, 1994	B623	19.2
24	2	"Pairing Off"	David Trainer	Glen Merzer	September 30, 1994	B625	19.3
25	3	"Notorious"	David Trainer	Jeff C. Sherman	October 7, 1994	B626	16.2
26	4	"Me and Mr. Joad"	David Trainer	Jeff Menell	October 14, 1994	B628	18.6
27	5	"The Uninvited"	David Trainer	Susan Estelle Jansen	October 21, 1994	B624	19.0
28	6	"Who's Afraid of Cory Wolf?"	David Trainer	Mark Blutman & Howard Busgang	October 28, 1994	B630	18.0
29	7	"Wake Up, Little Cory"	David Trainer	Glen Merzer	November 4, 1994	B627	18.8
30	8	"Band on the Run"	David Trainer	Mark Blutman & Howard Busgang	November 11, 1994	B631	20.3
31	9	"Fear Strikes Out"	David Trainer	Susan Estelle Jansen	November 18, 1994	B632	19.3
32	10	"Sister Theresa"	David Trainer	Jeff C. Sherman	November 25, 1994	B633	15.5
33	11	"The Beard"	David Trainer	Jeff Menell	December 9, 1994	B629	17.2
34	12	"Turnaround"	David Trainer	Michele Palermo	December 16, 1994	B634	17.5
35	13	"Cyrano"	David Trainer	Susan Estelle Jansen	January 6, 1995	B635	22.1
36	14	"I Am Not a Crook"	David Trainer	Steve Young	January 13, 1995	B636	18.7
37	15	"Breaking Up Is Really, Really Hard to Do"	Jeff McCracken	Mark Blutman & Howard Busgang	January 27, 1995	B637	20.9
38	16	"Danger Boy"	David Trainer	Glen Merzer	February 3, 1995	B638	19.6
39	17	"On the Air"	David Trainer	Mark Blutman & Howard Busgang	February 10, 1995	B640	18.8
40	18	"By Hook or By Crook"	David Trainer	Jeff Menell	February 17, 1995	B639	17.7
41	19	"Wrong Side of the Tracks"	David Trainer	Susan Estelle Jansen	February 24, 1995	B641	17.9
42	20	"Pop Quiz"	David Trainer	Story by : Kevin Kelton & Robert Kurtz & Eric Brand; Teleplay by : Kevin Kelton	March 10, 1995	B642	19.1
43	21	"The Thrilla' in Phila'"	David Trainer	Mark Blutman & Howard Busgang	May 5, 1995	B645	17.8
44	22	"Career Day"	David Trainer	Matthew Nelson	May 12, 1995	B643	15.1
45	23	"Home"	David Kendall	Jeff C. Sherman	May 19, 1995	B644	14.2

=== Season 3 (1995–96) ===
Boy Meets World Season 3 Episodes
No. overall	No. in season	Title	Directed by	Written by	Original release date	Prod. code	Viewers (millions)
46	1	"My Best Friend's Girl"	John Tracy	Jeff C. Sherman	September 22, 1995	B646	19.8
47	2	"The Double Lie"	Jeff McCracken	Matthew Nelson	September 29, 1995	B648	17.2
48	3	"What I Meant to Say"	David Kendall	Mark Blutman & Howard Busgang	October 13, 1995	B647	15.4
49	4	"He Said, She Said"	Jeff McCracken	Jeff Menell	October 20, 1995	B649	16.9
50	5	"Hometown Hero"	John Tracy	Matthew Nelson	October 27, 1995	B652	13.8
51	6	"This Little Piggy"	Jeff McCracken	Mark Blutman & Howard Busgang	November 3, 1995	B653	16.7
52	7	"Truth and Consequences"	Jeff McCracken	Donna Trujillo	November 10, 1995	B651	16.8
53	8	"Rave On"	David Trainer	Jeff C. Sherman	November 17, 1995	B655	16.6
54	9	"The Last Temptation of Cory"	David Trainer	Susan Meyers & Judy Toll	December 1, 1995	B650	13.0
55	10	"Train of Fools"	Jeff McCracken	Susan Meyers & Judy Toll	December 15, 1995	B656	17.4
56	11	"City Slackers"	Jeff McCracken	Kevin Kelton	January 5, 1996	B654	19.6
57	12	"The Grass Is Always Greener"	Jeff McCracken	Donna Trujillo	January 12, 1996	B658	19.3
58	13	"New Friends and Old"	John Tracy	Matthew Nelson	January 19, 1996	B659	17.6
59	14	"A Kiss Is More Than a Kiss"	John Tracy	Michael Swerdlick	January 26, 1996	B660	18.7
60	15	"The Heart is a Lonely Hunter"	Jeff McCracken	Kevin Kelton	February 2, 1996	B661	18.6
61	16	"Stormy Weather"	Jeff McCracken	Jeff Menell	February 9, 1996	B662	16.4
62	17	"The Pink Flamingo Kid"	Jeff McCracken	Mark Blutman & Howard Busgang	February 16, 1996	B657	17.1
63	18	"Life Lessons"	Jeff McCracken	Jeff C. Sherman	February 23, 1996	B663	18.9
64	19	"I Was a Teenage Spy"	David Trainer	Jeff C. Sherman	April 26, 1996	B665	13.2
65	20	"I Never Sang For My Legal Guardian"	David Trainer	Kevin Kelton	May 3, 1996	B664	11.4
66	21	"The Happiest Show on Earth"	Jeff McCracken	Mark Blutman & Howard Busgang	May 10, 1996	B666	12.2
67	22	"Brother Brother"	Jeff McCracken	Mark Blutman & Howard Busgang	May 17, 1996	B667	12.2

=== Season 4 (1996–97) ===
Boy Meets World Season 4 Episodes
No. overall	No. in season	Title	Directed by	Written by	Original release date	Prod. code	Viewers (millions)
68	1	"You Can Go Home Again"	Jeff McCracken	Mark Blutman & Howard Busgang	September 20, 1996	B720	13.1
69	2	"Hair Today, Goon Tomorrow"	Jeff McCracken	Susan Estelle Jansen	September 27, 1996	B721	13.2
70	3	"I Ain't Gonna Spray Lettuce No More"	Jeff McCracken	Mark Blutman & Howard Busgang	October 4, 1996	B722	12.3
71	4	"Fishing for Virna"	Jeff McCracken	Matthew Nelson	October 11, 1996	B723	12.3
72	5	"Shallow Boy"	Jeff McCracken	Jeff C. Sherman	October 18, 1996	B724	16.3
73	6	"Janitor Dad"	Jeff McCracken	Jeff Menell	October 25, 1996	B725	15.2
74	7	"Singled Out"	Jeff McCracken	Steve Hibbert	November 1, 1996	B727	14.8
75	8	"Dangerous Secret"	Jeff McCracken	Jeff C. Sherman	November 8, 1996	B726	16.0
76	9	"Sixteen Candles and Four-Hundred-Pound Men"	Jeff McCracken	Matthew Nelson	November 15, 1996	B728	15.3
77	10	"Turkey Day"	Jeff McCracken	Susan Estelle Jansen	November 22, 1996	B729	15.6
78	11	"An Affair to Forget"	Jeff McCracken	Story by : Eileen O'Hare; Teleplay by : Jeff C. Sherman	November 29, 1996	B730	12.4
79	12	"Easy Street"	Jeff McCracken	Jeff Menell	December 13, 1996	B732	14.3
80	13	"B & B's B 'N' B"	Jeff McCracken	Mark Blutman & Howard Busgang	January 3, 1997	B733	14.85
81	14	"Wheels"	Jeff McCracken	Jeff C. Sherman	January 17, 1997	B734	15.86
82	15	"Chick Like Me"	Jeff McCracken	Steve Hibbert	January 31, 1997	B731	13.70
83	16	"A Long Walk to Pittsburgh (Part 1)"	Jeff McCracken	Matthew Nelson	February 7, 1997	B736	14.41
84	17	"A Long Walk to Pittsburgh (Part 2)"	Jeff McCracken	Mark Blutman & Howard Busgang	February 14, 1997	B737	14.10
85	18	"Uncle Daddy"	Jeff McCracken	Steve Young	February 28, 1997	B738	15.02
86	19	"Quiz Show"	Jeff McCracken	Steve Hibbert	March 21, 1997	B735	12.68
87	20	"Security Guy"	Jeff McCracken	Story by : Mark Blutman & Howard Busgang; Teleplay by : Matthew Nelson	April 4, 1997	B740	12.58
88	21	"Cult Fiction"	Jeff McCracken	Jeff Menell	April 25, 1997	B739	9.92
89	22	"Learning to Fly"	Jeff McCracken	Jeff C. Sherman	May 2, 1997	B741	12.08

=== Season 5 (1997–98) ===
Boy Meets World Season 5 Episodes
No. overall	No. in season	Title	Directed by	Written by	Original release date	Prod. code	Viewers (millions)
90	1	"Brothers"	Alan Myerson	Matthew Nelson	October 3, 1997	B743	12.14
91	2	"Boy Meets Real World"	Alan Myerson	Sally Stiner & Bob Tischler	October 10, 1997	B742	12.07
92	3	"It's Not You... It's Me"	Alan Myerson	Mark Blutman & Howard Busgang	October 17, 1997	B745	11.40
93	4	"Fraternity Row"	Alan Myerson	Andy Guerdat	October 24, 1997	B746	11.21
94	5	"The Witches of Pennbrook"	Alan Myerson	Steve Hibbert	October 31, 1997	B749	10.20
95	6	"No Guts, No Cory"	Alan Myerson	Patricia Carr & Lara Runnels	November 7, 1997	B748	13.27
96	7	"I Love You, Donna Karan"	David Kendall	Ellen Idelson & Rob Lotterstein	November 14, 1997	B744	11.22
97	8	"Chasing Angela"	Alan Myerson	Matthew Nelson	November 14, 1997	B747	12.43
98	9	"How to Succeed in Business"	Alan Myerson	Ellen Idelson & Rob Lotterstein	November 28, 1997	B751	10.55
99	10	"Last Tango in Philly"	Alan Myerson	Jeff Menell	December 5, 1997	B750	12.16
100	11	"A Very Topanga Christmas"	David Kendall	Andy Guerdat	December 19, 1997	B752	11.20
101	12	"Raging Cory"	David Kendall	Barbie Feldman	January 9, 1998	B753	13.94
102	13	"The Eskimo"	Lisa Gottlieb	Jeff Menell	January 16, 1998	B755	14.65
103	14	"Heartbreak Cory"	William Russ	Patricia Carr & Lara Runnels	February 6, 1998	B754	11.91
104	15	"First Girlfriends' Club"	Alan Myerson	Story by : Mark Blutman & Howard Busgang; Teleplay by : Patricia Carr & Lara Runnels	February 13, 1998	B757	12.11
105	16	"Torn Between Two Lovers (Feeling Like a Fool)"	Jeff McCracken	Matthew Nelson	February 27, 1998	B756	13.30
106	17	"And Then There Was Shawn"	Jeff McCracken	Jeff Menell	February 27, 1998	B758	11.76
107	18	"If You Can't Be with the One You Love..."	Alan Myerson	Gary H. Miller	March 6, 1998	B760	11.60
108	19	"Eric Hollywood"	Alan Myerson	Barbie Feldman	March 20, 1998	B759	12.88
109	20	"Starry Night"	Jeff McCracken	Barry Safchik	April 3, 1998	B761	11.80
110	21	"Honesty Night"	Alan Myerson	Steve Hibbert	April 24, 1998	B763	10.06
111	22	"Prom-ises, Prom-ises"	Alan Myerson	Ellen Idelson & Rob Lotterstein	May 1, 1998	B762	10.90
112	23	"Things Change"	Alan Myerson	Matthew Nelson & Bob Tischler	May 8, 1998	B764	10.04
113	24	"Graduation"	Alan Myerson	Matthew Nelson & Bob Tischler	May 15, 1998	B765	11.83

=== Season 6 (1998–99) ===
Boy Meets World Season 6 Episodes
No. overall	No. in season	Title	Directed by	Written by	Original release date	Prod. code	Viewers (millions)
114	1	"His Answer (Part 1)"	Jeff McCracken	Bob Tischler	September 25, 1998	B766	13.06
115	2	"Her Answer (Part 2)"	David Kendall	Matthew Nelson	October 2, 1998	B767	12.42
116	3	"Ain't College Great?"	William Russ	Jeff Menell	October 9, 1998	B769	12.57
117	4	"Friendly Persuasion"	Jeff McCracken	Barbie Feldman	October 16, 1998	B770	12.09
118	5	"Better Than the Average Cory"	David Kendall	Patricia Carr & Lara Runnels	October 23, 1998	B768	11.67
119	6	"Hogs and Kisses"	Jeff McCracken	David Brownfield	October 30, 1998	B771	11.72
120	7	"Everybody Loves Stuart"	William Russ	Matthew Nelson	November 6, 1998	B774	13.99
121	8	"You're Married, You're Dead"	Jeff McCracken	Gary H. Miller	November 13, 1998	B772	11.88
122	9	"Poetic License: An Ode to Holden Caulfield"	William Russ	Erica Montolfo	November 20, 1998	B775	11.07
123	10	"And in Case I Don't See Ya..."	David Kendall	Barry Safchik	December 4, 1998	B773	9.25
124	11	"Santa's Little Helpers"	Lynn McCracken	Patricia Carr & Lara Runnels	December 11, 1998	B776	11.90
125	12	"Cutting the Cord"	Kevin Tracy	Allison M. Gibson	January 8, 1999	B777	11.66
126	13	"We'll Have a Good Time Then..."	David Kendall	Gary H. Miller	January 22, 1999	B778	11.98
127	14	"Getting Hitched"	Jeff McCracken	Jeff Menell	January 29, 1999	B779	11.94
128	15	"Road Trip"	David Kendall	Matthew Nelson	February 5, 1999	B780	12.34
129	16	"My Baby Valentine"	David Kendall	Patricia Carr & Lara Runnels	February 12, 1999	B781	11.41
130	17	"Resurrection"	Jodi Binstock	Matthew Nelson	February 19, 1999	B782	11.73
131	18	"Can I Help to Cheer You?"	Jerry Levine	Barry Safchik	March 12, 1999	B784	12.02
132	19	"Bee True"	Micky Dolenz	David Brownfield	April 9, 1999	B783	8.31
133	20	"The Truth About Honesty"	Jeff McCracken	Allison M. Gibson	April 30, 1999	B786	8.93
134	21	"The Psychotic Episode"	William Russ	Carlos Aragon	May 7, 1999	B785	8.25
135	22	"State of the Unions"	Jeff McCracken	Barbara Feldman	May 14, 1999	B787	8.47

=== Season 7 (1999–2000) ===
Boy Meets World Season 7 Episodes
No. overall	No. in season	Title	Directed by	Written by	Original release date	Prod. code	Viewers (millions)
136	1	"Show Me the Love (Part 1)"	David Kendall	Bob Tischler	September 24, 1999	B821	9.00
137	2	"For Love and Apartments (Part 2)"	David Kendall	Matthew Nelson	October 1, 1999	B822	7.99
138	3	"Angela's Men"	Jeff McCracken	Jeff Menell	October 8, 1999	B823	9.86
139	4	"No Such Thing as a Sure Thing"	Jeff McCracken	Gary H. Miller	October 15, 1999	B824	8.71
140	5	"You Light Up My Union"	Kevin Tracy	Allison M. Gibson	October 22, 1999	B825	7.75
141	6	"They're Killing Us"	William Russ	David Brownfield	October 29, 1999	B826	8.18
142	7	"It's About Time"	Jerry Levine	Patricia Carr & Lara Runnels	November 5, 1999	B827	11.51
143	8	"The Honeymooners"	William Russ	Barbie Feldman	November 12, 1999	B828	12.01
144	9	"The Honeymoon Is Over"	Jodi Binstock	Barry Safchik	November 19, 1999	B829	11.50
145	10	"Picket Fences"	Jerry Levine	Erica Montolfo	November 21, 1999	B830	10.10
146	11	"What a Drag!"	Jodi Binstock	Carlos Aragon	December 3, 1999	B831	8.41
147	12	"Family Trees"	Fred Savage	Matthew Nelson	December 17, 1999	B833	7.28
148	13	"The Provider"	Lynn McCracken	Jeff Menell	January 7, 2000	B832	9.19
149	14	"I'm Gonna Be Like You, Dad"	Kevin Tracy	Gary H. Miller	January 28, 2000	B834	9.60
150	15	"The War (Part 1)"	William Russ	Allison M. Gibson	February 11, 2000	B835	9.74
151	16	"Seven the Hard Way (Part 2)"	William Russ	David Brownfield	February 11, 2000	B836	9.74
152	17	"She's Having My Baby Back Ribs"	Jerry Levine	Patricia Carr & Lara Runnels	March 3, 2000	B837	9.02
153	18	"How Cory and Topanga Got Their Groove Back"	Lynn McCracken	Barbie Feldman	March 17, 2000	B838	8.07
154	19	"Brotherly Shove"	Jerry Levine	Matthew Nelson	March 31, 2000	B839	7.37
155	20	"As Time Goes By"	Steve Hoefer	Erica Montolfo	April 7, 2000	B840	6.33
156	21	"Angela's Ashes"	Fred Savage	Carlos Aragon	April 28, 2000	B841	6.52
157	22	"Brave New World (Part 1)"	Jeff McCracken	Matthew Nelson	May 5, 2000	B842	10.02
158	23	"Brave New World (Part 2)"	Jeff McCracken	Matthew Nelson	May 5, 2000	B842	10.02

== Ratings ==
Boy Meets World : U.S. viewers per episode (millions)

Season	Episode number																							
Season	1	2	3	4	5	6	7	8	9	10	11	12	13	14	15	16	17	18	19	20	21	22	23	24
1	16.5	19.2	18.5	20.4	17.1	21.3	22.0	21.2	15.8	18.1	19.0	24.1	23.9	21.0	21.4	22.7	14.9	19.3	20.1	16.2	16.2	16.3	–	
2	19.2	19.3	16.2	18.6	19.0	18.0	18.8	20.3	19.3	15.5	17.2	17.5	22.1	18.7	20.9	19.6	18.8	17.7	17.9	19.1	17.8	15.1	14.2	–
3	19.8	17.2	15.4	16.9	13.8	16.7	16.8	16.6	13.0	17.4	19.6	19.3	17.6	18.7	18.6	16.4	17.1	18.9	13.2	11.4	12.2	12.2	–	
4	13.1	13.2	12.3	12.3	16.3	15.2	14.8	16.0	15.3	15.6	12.4	14.3	14.85	15.86	13.70	14.41	14.10	15.02	12.68	12.58	9.92	12.08	–	
5	12.14	12.07	11.40	11.21	10.20	13.27	11.22	12.43	10.55	12.16	11.20	13.94	14.65	11.91	12.11	13.30	11.76	11.60	12.88	11.80	10.06	10.90	10.04	11.83
6	13.06	12.42	12.57	12.09	11.67	11.72	13.99	11.88	11.07	9.25	11.90	11.66	11.98	11.94	12.34	11.41	11.73	12.02	8.31	8.93	8.25	8.47	–	
7	9.00	7.99	9.86	8.71	7.78	8.18	11.51	12.01	11.50	10.10	8.47	7.28	9.19	9.60	9.74	9.74	9.02	8.04	7.37	6.33	6.52	10.02	10.02	–

Audience measurement performed by Nielsen Media Research (Note: The viewership statistics in the graph and table are sourced from the citations in the season-specific tables above.)
