= Boy Meets World season 5 =

Boy Meets World
- Season 5
- Season 5 DVD cover
- Starring: Ben Savage; William Daniels; Betsy Randle; Will Friedle; Rider Strong; Danielle Fishel; Lindsay Ridgeway; Matthew Lawrence; William Russ
- No. of episodes: 24

Release
- Original network: ABC
- Original release: October 3, 1997 – May 15, 1998

Season chronology
- ← Previous; Season 4 Next → Season 6

The fifth season of the television comedy series Boy Meets World aired between October 3, 1997 and May 15, 1998, on ABC in the United States. The season was produced by Michael Jacobs Productions and Touchstone Television with series creator Michael Jacobs as executive producer. It was broadcast as part of the ABC comedy block TGIF on Friday evenings.

== Cast ==
=== Main ===
- Ben Savage as Cory Matthews
- William Daniels as George Feeny (Note: Although series regulars are usually uncredited for the episodes that they did not appear in, series regulars William Daniels, Betsy Randle, Will Friedle, Matthew Lawrence, and William Russ are credited for the episode(s) that they were absent in.)
- Betsy Randle as Amy Matthews
- Will Friedle as Eric Matthews
- Rider Strong as Shawn Hunter
- Danielle Fishel as Topanga Lawrence
- Lindsay Ridgeway as Morgan Matthews (Note: Only credited for the episodes that she appeared in.)
- Matthew Lawrence as Jack Hunter
- William Russ as Alan Matthews

=== Recurring ===
- Trina McGee-Davis as Angela Moore

=== Special appearance ===
- Lee Norris as Stuart Minkus

== Episodes ==
Boy Meets World Season 5 Episodes
No. overall	No. in season	Title	Directed by	Written by	Original release date	Prod. code	Viewers (millions)
90	1	"Brothers"	Alan Myerson	Matthew Nelson	October 3, 1997	B743	12.14
Cory is so upset when Eric moves back home that he vows to find him a place to stay. But the perfect roommate he picks out is Shawn's long-lost half-brother, Jack, and there's no love lost as far as Shawn is concerned. Guest stars: Blake Clark as Chet Hunter, Glenn Hirsch as Delivery Man, Lora-Lyn Peterson as Ms. Valentine, Harmony Smith as Beautiful Girl Note: Anthony Tyler Quinn exits the main cast, Matthew Lawrence joins the main cast. Absent: Lindsay Ridgeway as Morgan Matthews
91	2	"Boy Meets Real World"	Alan Myerson	Sally Stiner & Bob Tischler	October 10, 1997	B742	12.07
In the vein of MTV's The Real World, Cory films a documentary about Jack, Shawn, and Eric adjusting to their new lives. However, when friction develops between Jack and Shawn, Cory must decide whether or not to continue filming his movie or help two friends in trouble. Topanga thinks Cory should prove himself more of a friend than a filmmaker. Also starring: Trina McGee-Davis as Angela Moore Guest stars: Meghann Haldeman as Wendy, Blake Clark as Chet Hunter, Ryan Gesell as Larry
92	3	"It's Not You... It's Me"	Alan Myerson	Mark Blutman & Howard Busgang	October 17, 1997	B745	11.40
After Shawn and Cory agree to attend the same college, Shawn learns Cory's made interview plans on his own – and the two decide it's time to go their separate ways. Meanwhile, Eric thinks befriending the dean will ease his and Jack's college experience. Guest stars: Paul Gleason as Dean Borack, Seth Miller as Lionel, Corey Pandos as Young Cory, Glen-Bob Sweet as Young Shawn, Rosario Gru as Young Topanga, Matt Kirkwood as Chubbie
93	4	"Fraternity Row"	Alan Myerson	Andy Guerdat	October 24, 1997	B746	11.21
After attending a college class and engaging in a winning debate with a professor, an empowered Shawn neglects high-school tasks in favor of collegiate ones – and gets suspended. Meanwhile, Eric forms his own fraternity (Magnum Pi), and arouses the Dean's suspicions. Guest stars: Paul Gleason as Dean Borack, Bernie Kopell as himself, Ted Lange as himself, Julius Carry as Professor Michaels, Nicki Aycox as Jennifer, Leslie Dannon as Lisa Note: Julius Carry, who plays Professor Michaels, later reappears in Season 7, playing Angela's father Sergeant Alvin Moore.
94	5	"The Witches of Pennbrook"	Alan Myerson	Steve Hibbert	October 31, 1997	B749	10.20
Witches seem to be invading Pennbrook College when Jack's new spooky girlfriend Millie causes a serious rift between the roommates after Eric tells Jack that he caught her practicing witchcraft. Meanwhile, Cory takes Topanga on her first airplane ride, flown by a not-so-bright pilot. Special guest star: Melissa Joan Hart as Sabrina Guest stars: Candace Cameron Bure as Millie, Chrish Wiehl as Dexter Absent: Betsy Randle as Amy Matthews, William Russ as Alan Matthews
95	6	"No Guts, No Cory"	Alan Myerson	Patricia Carr & Lara Runnels	November 7, 1997	B748	13.27
The time ball swallowed by Salem the Cat from Sabrina the Teenage Witch takes everyone back to the 1940s: Cory becomes a soldier fighting on the dangerous front lines in Europe, who wants his best buddy Shawn to marry his girl Topanga if he does not return. Special guest star: Nick Bakay as Salem Guest stars: Yvonne Sciò as Versailles, Kevin Brief as Mailman, Brook Lee as Dime-A-Dance Girl, Maurice LaMarche as Narrator, Radio Announcer Note: This episode is part two of a time-travel themed crossover with Sabrina the Teenage Witch, You Wish and Teen Angel that begins on "Inna Gadda Sabrina", continues on "Genie Without a Cause" and concludes on "One Dog Night".
96	7	"I Love You, Donna Karan"	David Kendall	Ellen Idelson & Rob Lotterstein	November 14, 1997	B744	11.22
Shawn's steadfast rule of dating girls only for a fixed two-week period leads him to break up with Angela; then he finds himself falling in love with the owner of a lost purse he finds, since the contents indicate that she is the girl of his dreams. Meanwhile, Eric studies for a test with the help of an invisible Mr. Feeny, while Jack wonders about Eric's sanity. To be continued... Also starring: Trina McGee-Davis as Angela Moore Guest stars: Maggie Lawson as Debbie, McKenna Jones as Beth Absent: Betsy Randle as Amy Matthews, Lindsay Ridgeway as Morgan Matthews, William Russ as Alan Matthews
97	8	"Chasing Angela"	Alan Myerson	Matthew Nelson	November 14, 1997	B747	12.43
An eager Cory encourages Shawn to consider the same type of long-term relationship he has with Topanga with Angela – except that the two of them start not to get along so well. Meanwhile, Jack and Eric are nervous about hosting Thanksgiving dinner for the Matthews family at their new apartment. Also starring: Trina McGee-Davis as Angela Moore Guest stars: Heather Shannon as Beverly, Salim Grant as Ted, Brian George as Eduardo, McKenna Jones as Beth
98	9	"How to Succeed in Business"	Alan Myerson	Ellen Idelson & Rob Lotterstein	November 28, 1997	B751	10.55
Confident Cory is amazed when Shawn is more successful at their work-study jobs: Shawn proves to be a whiz at public relations, while Cory gets stuck in the mail room. Meanwhile, Amy goes back to college, but her participation in Eric's creative writing class embarrasses him with her extremely frank self-revelations. Also starring: Trina McGee-Davis as Angela Moore Guest stars: Kevin Crowley as Mr. Morris, Phil Leeds as Phil, Alissa Ann Smego as Monica, Robert Kerbeck as Professor Absent: Lindsay Ridgeway as Morgan Matthews
99	10	"Last Tango in Philly"	Alan Myerson	Jeff Menell	December 5, 1997	B750	12.16
Cory and Shawn are loco with jealousy when the girls get jobs at a Mexican restaurant and start dancing the night away with two handsome, suave co-workers. Soon, they (along with Alan, Eric, Jack, and Mr. Feeny) try to figure out the hidden meaning behind women's words. Also starring: Trina McGee-Davis as Angela Moore Guest stars: Jonathan Del Arco as Nunzio, Sue Casey as Katherine, Lexi Mirai as Sonja Absent: Lindsay Ridgeway as Morgan Matthews
100	11	"A Very Topanga Christmas"	David Kendall	Andy Guerdat	December 19, 1997	B752	11.20
Cory wonders if he's being henpecked when Topanga spends the holidays with the Matthews family and takes charge of the festivities. Cory plans to surprise Topanga, who's spending Christmas at his house, with a promise ring that means they'll be together forever. But he's unnerved by moments of doubt after learning that he and Topanga—who have so much in common—have very different holiday traditions: she drinks cider rather than eggnog; she prefers a fresh-cut tree to an aluminum one; and she opens gifts on Christmas Eve, not in the morning. When it seems Topanga's unwilling to compromise, Cory has serious misgivings about the ring – and their future.
101	12	"Raging Cory"	David Kendall	Barbie Feldman	January 9, 1998	B753	13.94
Cory gets so upset that Alan engages only in conversation with him, but plays sports with Eric, that he knocks Alan down. So Alan and Eric kidnap Cory and take him sky diving. Afterward, Cory feels better, but now Eric's miffed that he and his dad rarely have meaningful conversations. Guest star: Steve Park as Jump Master
102	13	"The Eskimo"	Lisa Gottlieb	Jeff Menell	January 16, 1998	B755	14.65
Upset that the seniors are slacking off, Mr. Feeny threatens to issue F's and assigns personal goals to Shawn, Topanga and Cory: Shawn is to find two tickets to the Super Bowl, Topanga is to refrain from interfering, and Cory is to help them. Cory will fail if either Shawn or Topanga fails. Meanwhile, Eric and Jack search for soul mates. Guest stars: Tico Wells as D.J., Mindy Spence as Jill, Caroline Keenan as Carol, Greg Collins as Freezing Guy, Glen Chin as Eskimo, Matt Kirkwood as Lunatic, Max Miller as Bobby
103	14	"Heartbreak Cory"	William Russ	Patricia Carr & Lara Runnels	February 6, 1998	B754	11.91
When Cory sprains his ankle falling off the bus during the Senior Class ski trip to the Mount Sun Lodge, he doesn't tell Topanga when he spends the night (talking) with the young lady, Lauren, who's volunteered to take care of him. Also starring: Trina McGee-Davis as Angela Moore Guest star: Linda Cardellini as Lauren Absent: Betsy Randle as Amy Matthews, Will Friedle as Eric Matthews, Lindsay Ridgeway as Morgan Matthews, Matthew Lawrence as Jack Hunter, William Russ as Alan Matthews
104	15	"First Girlfriends' Club"	Alan Myerson	Story by : Mark Blutman & Howard Busgang; Teleplay by : Patricia Carr & Lara Runnels	February 13, 1998	B757	12.11
It's Valentine's Day, and Shawn's jilted exes are so sure he'll ruin his date with Angela that they kidnap him to keep him from hurting her. Meanwhile, Cory lands in trouble with Topanga after she reads a letter to him from Lauren (the "cute mountain girl" assigned to take care of him in the previous episode). Also starring: Trina McGee-Davis as Angela Moore Guest stars: Kristanna Loken as Jennifer, Larisa Oleynik as Dana, Lindsey McKeon as Libby Absent: William Daniels as George Feeny
105	16	"Torn Between Two Lovers (Feeling Like a Fool)"	Jeff McCracken	Matthew Nelson	February 27, 1998	B756	13.30
Cory is torn between making up with Topanga, or allowing himself to see how it would be to go out with Lauren. After he goes on a date with Lauren, he decides that he can't live without Topanga – but she decides she can't see him anymore. Meanwhile, Mr. Feeny entrusts Eric to be a substitute teacher for his citizenship class. Guest stars: Linda Cardellini as Lauren, Marilyn Tokuda as Minh, Jolie Jackunas as Svetlana, Jihad Harik as Rajiv Absent: Lindsay Ridgeway as Morgan Matthews, Matthew Lawrence as Jack Hunter
106	17	"And Then There Was Shawn"	Jeff McCracken	Jeff Menell	February 27, 1998	B758	11.76
Feeling that Cory and Topanga's break-up is having severe ramifications on his life, Shawn instigates a class-wide argument, prompting Mr. Feeny to send them all into detention. However, in a parody of Scream, I Know What You Did Last Summer, South Park, Scooby-Doo and And Then There Were None it soon develops into a detention like none of them have ever experienced. Also starring: Trina McGee-Davis as Angela Moore Guest stars: Jennifer Love Hewitt as Jennifer, Richard Lee Jackson as Kenny Note: This is the second time that Will Friedle and Jennifer Love Hewitt starred together after Trojan War. Also, Jack makes a reference to Party of Five in which Jennifer Love Hewitt played Sarah Reeves Merrin and girlfriend of the character Bailey Salinger. Absent: Betsy Randle as Amy Matthews, Lindsay Ridgeway as Morgan Matthews, William Russ as Alan Matthews
107	18	"If You Can't Be with the One You Love..."	Alan Myerson	Gary H. Miller	March 6, 1998	B760	11.60
Depressed by his break-up with Topanga, Cory gets a reputation of being a "downer," which he tries to shake off by drinking and partying. When Shawn catches Cory in the act, he convinces Shawn to try it as well—with disastrous results. In addition, Shawn discovers why Jack's mother left their father. Also starring: Trina McGee-Davis as Angela Moore Guest stars: Vanessa Evigan as Kimberly, Mike Batay as Transient, Max Miller as Kid Note: This episode was held back from Disney Channel airings because of mature content. Absent: Will Friedle as Eric Matthews, Lindsay Ridgeway as Morgan Matthews
108	19	"Eric Hollywood"	Alan Myerson	Barbie Feldman	March 20, 1998	B759	12.88
When Eric's shoddy set design injures the star of the college play, Eric assumes his role. After a surprisingly superb Shakespearean acting debut, Eric is invited to join the cast of the hit ABC sitcom Kid Gets Acquainted with Universe. But when he arrives at the studio, he discovers that the shallow, egotistical, and neurotic actors (played by the cast of Boy Meets World) are not at all like their roles. Meanwhile, Topanga tries to salvage her relationship with Shawn, who's not sure he can remain friends with both her and Cory in the wake of their breakup, after he and Jack come down with chicken pox. Guest stars: Robert Clohessy as Matt Frazier, Aubrey Morris as Professor Cookmond, Deborah Kellner as Judy, Marshall Raduziner as Dylan, David Jacobs as David, Rachel Jacobs as Rachel, Joshua Jacobs as Joshua, Dylan McCracken as Dylan, Claire McCracken as Claire, Ron Harper as Man #1, Jordan Bowers as Man #2, Matt Kirkwood as Paramedic
109	20	"Starry Night"	Jeff McCracken	Barry Safchik	April 3, 1998	B761	11.80
A once-in-a-lifetime Van Gogh retrospective makes Cory blue: he stood in line all night to get tickets for himself and Topanga, but she has gone with Angela instead – and met a terrific, intelligent and sensitive guy, Ricky Ferris, who claims she has already changed his life once (by beaning him in softball and convincing him to give up sports for art), spends all day with her looking at Van Gogh's The Starry Night and asks for a dinner date with her. Cory remains adamant that he will love Topanga forever and that kissing Lauren meant nothing to him. Topanga cannot bring herself to believe him until Ricky kisses her—and she rushes to tell Cory that it meant nothing to her and that she still loves him. Also starring: Trina McGee-Davis as Angela Moore Guest stars: Jonathan Jackson as Ricky Ferris, Randy Thompson as Guard, Stephanie Patton as Toddler, Joanna McCracken as Joanna, Katie Stern as Girl Absent: Betsy Randle as Amy Matthews, Will Friedle as Eric Matthews, Lindsay Ridgeway as Morgan Matthews, Matthew Lawrence as Jack Hunter, William Russ as Alan Matthews
110	21	"Honesty Night"	Alan Myerson	Steve Hibbert	April 24, 1998	B763	10.06
A reconciled Cory and Topanga pretend to be estranged so Shawn can be the one to "reunite" them, despite Mr. Feeny's warning that "the stupid idea train [is] coming 'round the bend". Shawn's mediation tactics lead to more turmoil for the duo: when he encourages them to be open about their hurt feelings, they insult each other and break up again. It's finally up to Shawn (with an assist from Cory's parents) to set things straight once and for all. Also starring: Trina McGee-Davis as Angela Moore Guest stars: Linda Cardellini as Lauren, Jonathan Jackson as Ricky Ferris Absent: Lindsay Ridgeway as Morgan Matthews
111	22	"Prom-ises, Prom-ises"	Alan Myerson	Ellen Idelson & Rob Lotterstein	May 1, 1998	B762	10.90
It's a big night: Senior Prom, and Shawn and Cory plan to "leave as boys and come back men." Angela quickly decides she and Shawn are not ready for sex, but Topanga feels that she and Cory may be ready, as long as the night goes "exactly, perfectly right." Meanwhile, Amy is upset because of how Alan reacts to her recent good news: she's pregnant. To make up for it, he decides to check them into a hotel: the same one where the prom is being held. Eventually, Cory and Topanga decide they aren't ready for the potential consequences, and decide to wait. Also starring: Trina McGee-Davis as Angela Moore Guest stars: Jarrett Lennon as Howie, John Balma as Clerk, Aaron Nelms as Bobby, Kim Serafin as Pretty Woman, Cyndi Coyne as Maid Note: This episode was held back from Disney Channel airings due to mature content. Absent: Lindsay Ridgeway as Morgan Matthews
112	23	"Things Change"	Alan Myerson	Matthew Nelson & Bob Tischler	May 8, 1998	B764	10.04
Cory is distressed when he realizes that his entire world is changing around him: Shawn considers not going to college, Topanga considers going to Yale, Chubbie's is reformed as "Peg-Leg Pete's", and Mr. Feeny intends to retire and move to Wyoming. The anxiously awaited college acceptance letters have finally arrived. But Cory, who expects his longtime friends will want to continue as classmates, finds that everything cannot always go according to his plan. Also starring: Trina McGee-Davis as Angela Moore Guest stars: David Packer as Jonathan, Rikki Dale as Maria, Zack Graham as Barry, Robert Gorman as David, Caprice Fisher as Nicole, Hila Levy as Terri
113	24	"Graduation"	Alan Myerson	Matthew Nelson & Bob Tischler	May 15, 1998	B765	11.83
It's the end of an era as Cory, Shawn, Topanga, Angela, and the rest of their class prepare to graduate. In the final week, Mr. Feeny assigns the class to write about "what is in their hearts." While Shawn ignores the assignment at first, seeing as high school is now over, he comes to realize that his school days meant more to him than he realizes. Meanwhile, Topanga wrestles with going to Yale or staying with Cory. Cory tries to hide his lying eyes and convince Topanga that he wants her to go away to Yale, and Shawn surprises everyone with his indifference toward graduation. Cory, Shawn, and Topanga reunite with their old classmate, Stuart Minkus, who reveals he has been on the other side of the school the entire time, along with Mr. Turner (unseen). Meanwhile, Eric tries to keep Mr. Feeny from retiring, and Topanga slyly steals the valedictorian position from Minkus and shocks Cory by proposing to him. Also starring: Trina McGee-Davis as Angela Moore Guest stars: Blake Soper as Joey, Ethan Suplee as Frankie, Lee Norris as Stuart Minkus
