= Trina McGee =

American actress

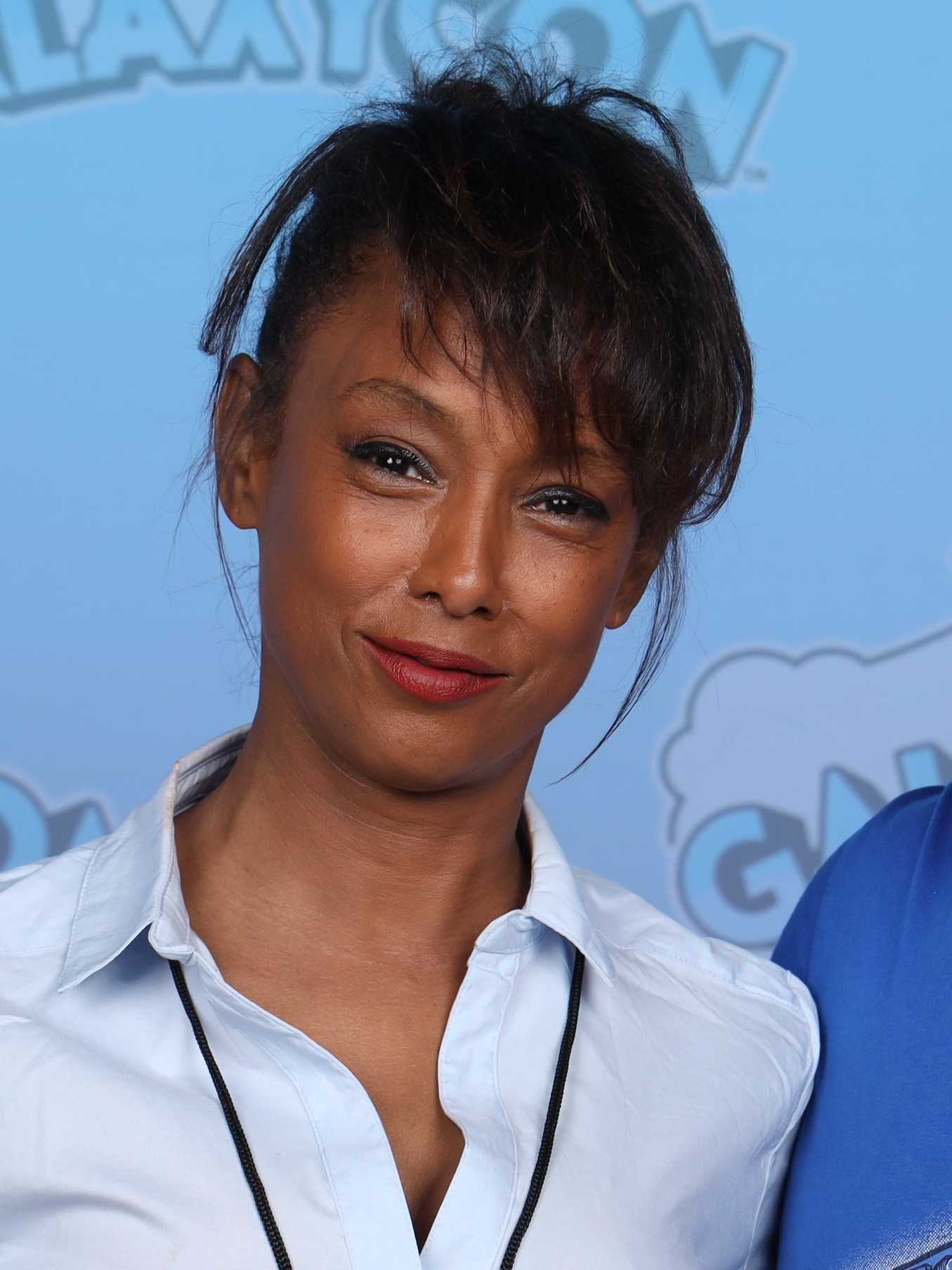
- McGee at GalaxyCon Richmond in 2023
- Born: 1968 or 1969 (age 56–57)
- Other name: Trina McGee-Davis
- Occupation: Actress
- Years active: 1992–present
- Known for: Boy Meets World
- Spouse: Marcello Thedford
- Children: 3

Trina McGee (born 1968 or 1969; formerly known as Trina McGee-Davis) is an American actress best known for her portrayal of Angela Moore on the ABC-TV sitcom Boy Meets World.

== Early life ==
McGee attended Howard University in Washington, D.C. for a time. Although her parents wanted her to be an attorney or a doctor, two years of studying psychology at Howard led her to pursue a career in entertainment.

== Career ==
McGee's early career included acting in the Off-Broadway production Club Twelve.

After appearing in minor film roles and guest-starring in various sitcoms, McGee landed her first recurring TV role as Angela Moore in Boy Meets World in 1997. Angela's interracial relationship with Shawn Hunter (played by Rider Strong, to whom McGee is 10 years senior) was unusual for a major network television show at the time, especially one whose target demographic was teenagers. She once remarked that the typical reaction she received from young fans regarding the relationship was overwhelmingly positive and encouraging, often inquiring as to when the characters might reconcile after a breakup. She expressed her personal wish that the relationship would serve as an example of diversity for the world. In 2015, she reprised the role in one episode of the sequel series Girl Meets World.

In June 2020, McGee stated that she experienced racism while starring on Boy Meets World. She stated that the people she had incidents with were Will Friedle and Michael Jacobs. She said that she has since made amends with Friedle.

== Personal life ==
McGee married actor Marcello Thedford. She has three children, and in June 2024 she revealed that she was pregnant with her fourth child, which was lost to miscarriage shortly thereafter.

== Filmography ==
=== Film ===
Year	Title	Role	Notes
1996	The Birdcage	Chocolate	
1996	Daylight	LaTonya	
2002	Friday After Next	Cinnamon	
2009	Da' Booty Shop	Yolanda Johnson	
2010	Pastor Jones	Tanya Jones	Video
2016	Confessions of Isabella	Rosa	Video
2016	Sins of the Guilty	Vanessa Johnson	
2016	LAPD African Cops	-	
2023	Classmates	Thalia	

=== Television ===
Year	Title	Role	Notes
1992	A Different World	Gennifer	Episode: "Kiss You Back"
1994	Martin	Woman #2	Episode: "Yours, Mine and Ours"
1994	The Sinbad Show	Faith	Recurring Cast
1994	Picket Fences	Deborah	Episode: "Enemy Lines"
1995	Family Matters	Josie	Episode: "The Gun"
1995	The Parent 'Hood	Ashley Houchins	Episode: "IQ, UQ, We All Q"
1997–00	Boy Meets World	Angela Moore	Recurring Cast: Season 5, Main Cast: Season 6-7
1999	City Guys	Ashley	Recurring Cast: Season 3
2000	City of Angels	Saidah	Episode: "Assume the Position"
2002	So Little Time	Waitress	Episode: "The New Guy"
2002	The Hughleys	Mia	Episode: "It's a Girl: Part 2"
2007	All of Us	Stacy	Episode: "He's Got Game"
2015	Girl Meets World	Angela Moore	Episode: "Girl Meets Hurricane"
2015	In the Cut	Karen	Episode: "The Ball's in Your Court"

=== As writer, director, or producer ===
Year	Title	Project	Notes
2010	Jessica Sinclaire Presents: Confessions of a Lonely Wife	Feature film	Producer, writer
2010	Keepin' the Faith: Momma's Got a Boyfriend	Video	Writer
2016	Confessions of Isabella	Video	Composer, director, producer, writer
2016	Sins of the Guilty	Feature film	Casting director, producer, writer
2020	Detainment	Feature film	Director, writer
