= What's Alan Watching? =

- Genre: Comedy
- Created by: Bob Tischler
- Directed by: Thomas Schlamme
- Starring: Corin Nemec; Eddie Murphy
- Country of origin: United States
- Original language: English
- No. of seasons: 1
- No. of episodes: 1

Production
- Producer: Eddie Murphy
- Camera setup: Single-camera
- Running time: 60 minutes
- Production companies: Eddie Murphy Television; Paramount Television

Original release
- Network: CBS
- Release: February 27, 1989

What's Alan Watching? was a 1989 CBS television series pilot.

== Overview ==
Produced by Eddie Murphy and his company, Eddie Murphy Television, What's Alan Watching? starred Corin Nemec as Alan, a 17-year-old couch potato who views life, and his family, as if they were on television. Libby (Barbara Barrie) and Leo (Peter Michael Goetz) are his parents, Gail (future sitcom star Fran Drescher) is his sister, Jeff (David Packer) is his brother and Alyssa (Cheryl Pollak) is his girlfriend. Murphy also had a cameo in the episode, playing a protester decrying James Brown's incarceration, as well as Brown himself.

The episode was directed by Thomas Schlamme and aired on CBS on February 27, 1989. The network passed on making it a regular series, but What's Alan Watching? did win the Television Critics Association's TCA Award for Outstanding Achievement in Movies, Miniseries and Specials.

== In popular culture ==
TV critic Alan Sepinwall named his personal television blog "What's Alan Watching?" after the television program.
