= Boy Meets World =

American television sitcom (1993–2000)

- Genre: Sitcom
- Created by: Michael Jacobs & April Kelly
- Starring: Ben Savage; William Daniels; Betsy Randle; Will Friedle; Rider Strong; Lee Norris; Lily Nicksay; William Russ; Danielle Fishel; Anthony Tyler Quinn; Alex Désert; Lindsay Ridgeway; Matthew Lawrence; Trina McGee-Davis; Maitland Ward
- Theme music composer: Ray Colcord (seasons 1–4); Phil Rosenthal (seasons 5–7)
- Composer: Ray Colcord
- Countries of origin: United States, Philadelphia
- Original language: English
- No. of seasons: 7
- No. of episodes: 158 (list of episodes)

Production
- Executive producers: Michael Jacobs; David Kendall; Bob Young; Howard Busgang; Mark Blutman; Bob Tischler; Steven Derek Booth
- Production locations: Walt Disney Studios, Stage 2 (seasons 1–2); KTLA Studios (season 3–4); CBS Radford (season 5–7)
- Camera setup: Videotape; Multi-camera
- Running time: 21–23 minutes
- Production companies: Michael Jacobs Productions; Touchstone Television

Original release
- Network: ABC
- Release: September 24, 1993 – May 5, 2000

Related
- Girl Meets World (2014–2017)

Boy Meets World is an American coming-of-age sitcom created by Michael Jacobs and April Kelly that aired on ABC for seven seasons between September 1993 and May 2000. The series centers on Cory Matthews (Ben Savage) and his friends and family, as he progresses from childhood to adulthood. Episodes chronicle the everyday events of Cory's home and school life; his teacher and neighbor George Feeny (William Daniels) delivers life lessons as Cory learns to cope with social and personal issues of adolescence. Cory has strong relationships with his older brother Eric (Will Friedle), younger sister Morgan (Lily Nicksay, who was later replaced with Lindsay Ridgeway in season 3) and parents, Amy (Betsy Randle) and Alan (William Russ). Cory's friendship with Shawn Hunter (Rider Strong) and romantic interest in Topanga Lawrence (Danielle Fishel) serve as central focuses of episodes. Overarching themes include a focus on family and friendships as well as discovering one's identity. Further characters were introduced in later seasons: Jonathan Turner (Anthony Tyler Quinn), Eli Williams (Alex Désert), Jack Hunter (Matthew Lawrence), Angela Moore (Trina McGee-Davis) and Rachel McGuire (Maitland Ward).

The Walt Disney Company commissioned the series for its youth-oriented TGIF programming block airing on ABC. Jacobs had previously produced Dinosaurs for the block and was asked to create a new series for a 12-to-14-year-old audience. Savage was under a contract with ABC at the time and Jacobs chose to include him as the central character. Boy Meets World was produced by Michael Jacobs Productions and Touchstone Television, and premiered on ABC on September 24, 1993. The series concluded on May 5, 2000, as a result of the aging cast and a shift in the network's programming directives.

Boy Meets World experienced strong ratings for the teenage demographic throughout its seven seasons, and it was later syndicated on Disney Channel. Several cast members were nominated for Young Artist Awards. Savage and Fishel reprised their roles as series regulars in the spin-off Girl Meets World, which aired on Disney Channel from 2014 to 2017, and depicted Cory and Topanga as married parents. Fishel, Friedle and Strong also went on to create a rewatch podcast, Pod Meets World.

== Plot ==
In the first season, Cory Matthews (Ben Savage) is a witty 11-year-old middle school student in Philadelphia, who speaks his mind and has an interest in sports. He shares a love-hate relationship with his sixth-grade teacher and neighbor George Feeny (William Daniels), and often finds himself in trouble during class. Cory's relationship with his older brother Eric (Will Friedle) becomes strained when Eric's obsession with dating girls, which is a foreign concept to Cory, begins to take precedence over the time they spend together. Cory shares a strong bond with his parents, Amy (Betsy Randle) and Alan (William Russ), and his younger sister Morgan (Lily Nicksay). His classmates include his best friend Shawn Hunter (Rider Strong), the intelligent Stuart Minkus (Lee Norris), and the nonconformist Topanga (Danielle Fishel), for whom he gradually begins to develop feelings.

In the second season, Cory, Shawn, and Topanga begin high school and are taught by Jonathan Turner (Anthony Tyler Quinn), an unorthodox English teacher, while Mr. Feeny becomes their principal. Cory and Topanga admit their feelings for each other and begin dating in the third season, while Eric is not accepted to any colleges or universities following his high school graduation. The fourth season includes Eric revisiting his studies and Alan opening a sporting goods store with Eric as his partner. Eric begins college in the fifth season and moves into an apartment with Jack (Matthew Lawrence), whom he learns is Shawn's half-brother. Throughout the season, Shawn develops a relationship with a new student, Angela (Trina McGee), and Amy becomes pregnant. Topanga is accepted to Yale University, but rejects the offer to remain close to Cory, which leads her to propose to him at their graduation.

In the sixth season, Cory and his friends begin college, where Mr. Feeny is offered a teaching job. Rachel McGuire (Maitland Ward) moves in with Eric and Jack and they both develop feelings for her; Jack dates her. The new Matthews baby, Joshua, is born prematurely. Cory and Topanga get married in the seventh season and move into an apartment on campus. The series concludes with Cory, Topanga, Shawn, and Eric moving to New York City, when Topanga secures an internship at a law firm, while Jack and Rachel join the Peace Corps and Angela moves to Europe for a year with her dad.

== Characters ==
- Cory Matthews (Ben Savage), the protagonist, who experiences challenging scenarios and life lessons as he grows up
- George Feeny (William Daniels), Cory's teacher, and later principal, who imparts life lessons and advice to his students
- Amy Matthews (Betsy Randle), Cory's mother
- Eric Matthews (Will Friedle), Cory's scatter-brained older brother
- Shawn Hunter (Rider Strong), Cory's best friend who comes from a troubled family
- Stuart Minkus (Lee Norris) (season 1, guest season 5), an intelligent student in Cory's sixth grade class
- Morgan Matthews (Lily Nicksay, seasons 1–2; Lindsay Ridgeway, seasons 3–7), Cory's younger sister
- Alan Matthews (William Russ), Cory's father, a grocery store manager who later runs a camping goods store
- Topanga Lawrence (Danielle Fishel) (seasons 2–7, recurring season 1), Cory's classmate and friend, who he develops a relationship with and later marries
- Jonathan Turner (Anthony Tyler Quinn) (seasons 2–4), Cory's high school English teacher who is easy-going and inspires his students
- Eli Williams (Alex Désert) (season 3), another teacher at Cory's high school and Jonathan's best friend from college
- Jack Hunter (Matthew Lawrence) (seasons 5–7), Shawn's long-lost half-brother
- Angela Moore (Trina McGee-Davis) (seasons 6–7, recurring season 5), Shawn's on-again-off-again girlfriend and Topanga's best friend and college roommate
- Rachel McGuire (Maitland Ward) (seasons 6–7), Topanga and Angela's friend at college and Eric and Jack's roommate

== Production ==
=== Development and casting ===
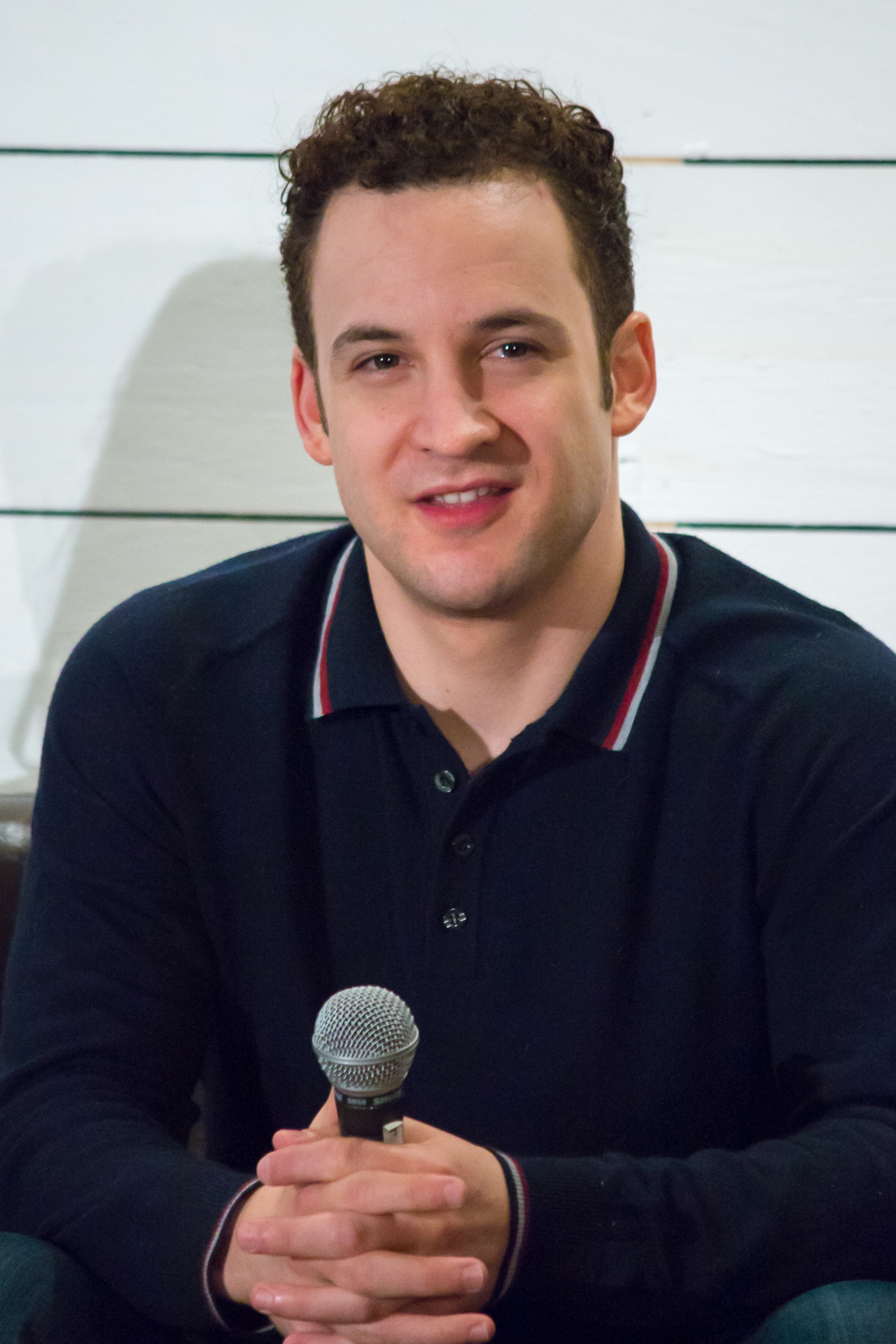
Ben Savage, pictured in 2015, serves as the program's central focus.

Boy Meets World was created to air on the TGIF programming block which had been airing on ABC since 1989. The series was created by Michael Jacobs, who produced Dinosaurs for the same block. Jacobs was approached by a Disney executive after the conclusion of Dinosaurs, to write a new series for the 12 to 14-year-old demographic. Jacobs noticed how other sitcoms focused on the oldest child of a family, which led him to create Boy Meets World with the middle child as the central character.

Ben Savage was already under a contract at ABC at 11 years old when Jacobs chose to include him in the series, which became known as The Ben Savage Project. Jacobs wanted to work with William Daniels, but Daniels was apprehensive about acting in a sitcom and initially rejected the offer before asking for the pilot to be re-written. Daniels had threatened to quit, and told Jacobs he did not want the role of Mr. Feeny to make fun of teachers, but knew the character would be respected when Jacobs stated it was based on a mentor of his. Rider Strong was the first actor to audition for the role of Shawn and was successful. Strong's older brother Shiloh Strong was shortlisted to play Eric alongside Jason Marsden and Will Friedle; Friedle secured the role, however, a different actor portrayed Eric in the unaired pilot. Danielle Fishel was not the original actor cast as Topanga, but she assumed the role before the character's first episode; Jacobs also threatened to fire Fishel during the filming week.

Boy Meets World was renewed for a fifth season in April 1997. In the fifth season, Matthew Lawrence joined the cast as Jack Hunter, Eric's college roommate. Daniels' wife Bonnie Bartlett portrays the recurring role of Dean Bolander, the dean of the university, in the later seasons of the show.

=== Writing and filming ===
During the writing of the pilot, network executives removed the episode's references to Shakespeare, considering these elements as too mature for the audience. The episode was poorly received at the table read, and Jacobs re-wrote the pilot overnight. Part of the rewrite was to ensure that Mr. Feeny was portrayed in a way that was respectful of teachers and did not make fun of them, at Daniels' request. Strong later commented on the difficult atmosphere of filming on-set, which he described as a "damaging" environment that was cultivated by Jacobs, who had high expectations of the cast. Director David Trainer stated that Jacobs used "emotional manipulation" on the younger cast.

The chemistry between Savage and Fishel led to producers developing a romantic relationship between Cory and Topanga. Jacobs was told by an ABC executive that marrying the pair would be irresponsible, before a favorable Internet poll led to the decision being approved. As the series progressed, Eric's characterization became more foolish and unintelligent to accommodate Friedle's comedic abilities.

Jeff Sherman, who was a producer and writer on the show, advocated to include issues such as vandalism and child abuse in the series, regardless of it being a comedy. An episode in the first season, "The Fugitive", discusses the idea of running away from home. Bob Tischler served as an executive producer alongside Jacobs towards the end of the show's run.

=== Conclusion ===
Boy Meets World was renewed for a sixth season in April 1998. Sabrina the Teenage Witch, another series airing on Friday nights, was the only other show to be renewed that year. By this time, the ratings for Boy Meets World had decreased by 14% from the last season, and the TGIF ratings had decreased by 17% overall.

In 2000, Sabrina the Teenage Witch, moved from airing on ABC to the WB; by this stage, it was expected that Boy Meets World would also end its run, causing doubt about the future of the block. By April, production on the seventh season of Boy Meets World had concluded, and Savage was already planning on attending college. The series did not produce a "large-scale" series finale, and there was a possibility the show could return. In the same month, ABC officially announced that the seventh season would be the final season of the show. The hour-long series finale aired on May 5, 2000, in which Cory and Topanga consider moving to New York.

== Series overview ==
Season	Episodes	Originally released		Viewers (millions)	Rank
Season	Episodes	First released	Last released	Viewers (millions)	Rank
1	22	September 24, 1993	May 13, 1994	8.5	#37
2	23	September 23, 1994	May 19, 1995	11.5	#36
3	22	September 22, 1995	May 17, 1996	10.1	#48
4	22	September 20, 1996	May 2, 1997	8.7	#51
5	24	October 3, 1997	May 15, 1998	11.6	#55
6	22	September 25, 1998	May 14, 1999	10.9	#58
7	23	September 24, 1999	May 5, 2000	8.7	#73

== Broadcast ==
=== Syndication and streaming ===
Boy Meets World reruns began airing on various Fox, WB, UPN, and independent affiliates from September 8, 1997 to September 1, 2000. During the latter month, Disney Channel assumed syndication rights, with the series running on the cable channel until 2007. ABC Family (now Freeform) aired Boy Meets World from June 21, 2004 to August 31, 2007 and again from April 12, 2010 to December 2, 2015. It has since returned to Freeform as of February 5, 2024. The series also began airing on MTV2 since November 14, 2011. On May 5, 2014, the show temporarily returned to Disney Channel after a seven-year absence to promote the sequel spin-off Girl Meets World.

On September 29, 2017, Boy Meets World became available for streaming on Hulu along with fellow Disney–ABC television properties Dinosaurs and Home Improvement, in addition to fellow TGIF programs Family Matters, Full House, Hangin' with Mr. Cooper, Perfect Strangers, Sabrina the Teenage Witch, and Step by Step. On April 11, 2019, it was confirmed that Disney+, a new streaming service owned by Disney, would be carrying the series upon its November 2019 launch.

== Reception ==
=== Viewership ===
Boy Meets World experienced strong ratings for the teenage demographic. During the airing of the fifth season in 1997–98, Boy Meets World was the winner of its timeslot among children, teenagers and adults aged 18–49, while placing second in its timeslot overall. The series was on average receiving a 14% decrease in ratings from the previous season. It was described as the number 2 series for children on primetime television. By the airing of the seventh season, the ratings had continued to decline as the audience for the TGIF block decreased.

=== Cultural impact ===
Angela's interracial relationship with Shawn was a relative rarity for a major network television show targeting youths at the time. Trina McGee-Davis once remarked that the typical reaction she received from young fans regarding the relationship was overwhelmingly positive and encouraging, often inquiring as to when the characters would reconcile after a breakup. She expressed her personal wish that her character's relationship would serve as an example of color blindness for the world, in lieu of a less positive reaction a similar relationship had received on Ally McBeal at the time.

Eric and Shawn both wore a popular 1990s hairstyle called curtained hair.

The show also addresses the cultural issues of child abuse ("Dangerous Secret"), sexual harassment ("Chick Like Me", "Everybody Loves Stuart"), and underage drinking/alcohol use ("If You Can't Be with the One You Love…").

=== Awards and nominations ===
List of awards and nominations received by Boy Meets World
Award	Year	Recipient(s)	Category	Result	Ref.
Nickelodeon Kids' Choice Awards	1999	Boy Meets World	Favorite Television Show	Nominated	
Nickelodeon Kids' Choice Awards	2000	Boy Meets World	Favorite Television Show	Nominated	
Nickelodeon Kids' Choice Awards	2000	Ben Savage & Rider Strong	Favorite Television Friends	Won	
Young Artist Awards	1994	Ben Savage	Youth Actor Leading Role in a Television Series	Nominated	
Young Artist Awards	1994	Rider Strong	Best Youth Comedian	Nominated	
Young Artist Awards	1994	Lily Nicksay	Best Actress Under Ten in a Television Series or Show	Nominated	
Young Artist Awards	1994	Boy Meets World	Best New Television Series	Nominated	
Young Artist Awards	1995	Will Friedle	Best Performance: Young Actor in a TV Comedy Series	Nominated	
Young Artist Awards	1995	Jason Marsden	Best Performance: Young Actor in a TV Comedy Series	Nominated	
Young Artist Awards	1996	Danielle Fishel	Best Performance by a Young Actress: TV Comedy Series	Nominated	
Young Artist Awards	1996	Justin Thomson	Best Performance by a Young Actor: Guest Starring Role TV Series	Won	
Young Artist Awards	1996	Erin J. Dean	Best Performance by a Young Actress: Guest Starring Role TV Series	Nominated	
Young Artist Awards	1997	Ben Savage	Best Performance in a TV Comedy: Leading Young Actor	Nominated	
Young Artist Awards	1997	Rider Strong	Best Performance in a TV Comedy: Supporting Young Actor	Nominated	
Young Artist Awards	1997	Danielle Fishel	Best Performance in a TV Comedy: Supporting Young Actress	Nominated	
Young Artist Awards	1998	Ben Savage	Best Performance in a TV Comedy Series: Leading Young Performer	Nominated	
Young Artist Awards	1999	Jarrett Lennon	Best Performance in a TV Comedy Series: Guest Starring Young Actor	Won (Note: Tied.)	
Young Artist Awards	2000	J. B. Gaynor	Best Performance in a TV Comedy Series: Guest Starring Young Performer	Won	
YoungStar Awards	1998	Ben Savage	Best Performance by a Young Actor in a Comedy TV Series	Nominated	
YoungStar Awards	1998	Danielle Fishel	Best Performance by a Young Actress in a Comedy TV Series	Won	
YoungStar Awards	2000	Danielle Fishel	Best Performance by a Young Actress in a Comedy TV Series	Nominated	

== Other media ==
=== Home video releases ===
Walt Disney Studios Home Entertainment (as Buena Vista Home Entertainment) released the first three seasons of Boy Meets World on DVD in 2004 and 2005.

On August 4, 2008, it was announced that Lionsgate Home Entertainment had acquired the rights to the series. They subsequently re-released the first three seasons on DVD on September 7, 2010, with the same special features from the original releases. Season 4 was released on December 7, 2010. Season 5 was released on May 3, 2011. Season 6 was released on July 5, 2011. Season 7 was released on October 4, 2011, completing the series' run on DVD.

On November 5, 2013, Lionsgate released Boy Meets World: The Complete Collection on DVD in Region 1. The 22-disc set features all 158 episodes of the series as well as new and previously included bonus features from the original sets.

=== Sequel series ===
In November 2012, Disney Channel announced that it had greenlit a pilot for a sequel/spin-off series, Girl Meets World. This series picks up nearly fifteen years after Boy Meets World ended, and follows Cory and Topanga's daughter Riley (Rowan Blanchard) as she navigates the challenges of her adolescent years along with her best friend Maya (Sabrina Carpenter).

Ben Savage and Danielle Fishel reprised their roles as Cory and Topanga, while several other cast members from Boy Meets World made recurring appearances, most prominently Rider Strong (Shawn Hunter), Matthew Lawrence (Jack Hunter), Will Friedle (Eric Matthews), Danny McNulty (Harley Keiner), Lee Norris (Stuart Minkus), and William Daniels (Mr. Feeny). Michael Jacobs returned as showrunner. Girl Meets World ran for three seasons before ending in 2017.

=== Rewatch podcast ===
Fishel, Friedle and Strong began hosting a podcast in 2022 in which they rewatch and commentate on every episode of Boy Meets World. The podcast, entitled Pod Meets World, is published by iHeartRadio and launched on June 27. Savage chose not to take part in the project despite being invited. In 2023, Fishel, Friedle and Strong revealed that Savage had actually cut off all contact with them in 2020, without explanation. The podcast featured guests Daniels, McGee, Randle, Russ, Lawrence, and Ward.
