= Bob Tischler =

American television producer (1946–2024)

- Born: June 12, 1946; Englewood, New Jersey, U.S.
- Died: July 13, 2024 (aged 78); Bodega Bay, California, U.S.
- Occupation(s): Writer, television producer
- Spouses: Belinda Horowitz (divorced); Judith English
- Children: 1

Robert Tischler (June 12, 1946 – July 13, 2024) was an American television writer, audio engineer and television producer. Tischler engineered the National Lampoon's first comedy album and with Michael O'Donoghue co-created and produced the National Lampoon Radio Hour. A friend of John Belushi's since the Radio Hour days, Tischler produced four Blues Brothers albums, the first of which, Briefcase Full of Blues, reached No. 1 on the Billboard 200 and went double platinum. He later worked on Saturday Night Live as head writer from 1981 to 1985.

== Background ==
Robert Tischler was born in Englewood, New Jersey, in 1946. He was educated at Ithaca College and Franconia College but never obtained a degree.

Tischler was married to and divorced from Belinda Horowitz; he later married Judith English. He had a son.

Tischler died from pancreatic cancer at his home in Bodega Bay, California, on July 13, 2024, at the age of 78.

== Career ==
Tischler was making radio spots for movie studios when, after hiring improvisational actor Christopher Guest as voice talent, Guest and Tischler became friends. "Chris got me into show business," Tischler later recalled. When Guest became involved with National Lampoon's 1972 Radio Dinner album, he called on Tischler to help. Tischler co-produced the record with Lampoon magazine writers Tony Hendra and Michael O'Donoghue.

In 1981, Tischler joined Saturday Night Live when Dick Ebersol took creative control; Tischler served as head writer for four seasons, leaving the show in 1985. During his tenure, he helped reverse the show's declining fortunes after its rocky sixth season. He championed Eddie Murphy as a cast member, whose emergence as a star was credited as a major factor for the show's newfound successes. Guest, Billy Crystal, and Martin Short also joined the show during this time.

Tischler produced David Brenner's late-night talk show Nightlife during the 1986-'87 season and had since written for and produced a number of television series, including What's Alan Watching?, Empty Nest, Something So Right and Boy Meets World.
