= SETC =

SETC may refer to:

- State Express Transport Corporation, a state-owned transport corporation in the Indian state of Tamil Nadu
- Space Exploration Technologies Corporation, an American spacecraft manufacturer
- Strong Europe Tank Challenge, an annual tank crew competition hosted by the U.S. Army Europe and the German Army
- Suez Economic and Trade Cooperation Zone
- "set byte to 1 on carry" (SETC), one of the SETcc instructions in the x86 instruction set
- Set^{C}; see Cartesian closed category
- Southeastern Theatre Conference, a non-profit organization; see Centre Stage
- State Economic and Trade Commission, a Chinese agency now merged into the National Development and Reform Commission
- Surface-Engineered Tape Casting, a method of fabricating carbon nanotubes
