= Rose Meth =

Jewish participant of the Auschwitz Sonderkommando uprising (1919–2013)

- Born: Ruzia Grunapfel; October 11, 1919; Zator, Poland
- Died: October 11, 2013 (aged 94); Kew Gardens Hills, Queens, New York, U.S.
- Known for: Auschwitz Sonderkommando uprising participant

Rose Grunapfel Meth (October 11, 1919 – October 11, 2013) born as Ruzia Grunapfel, also known as Reisel Grunapfel Meth, was one of several Jewish participants in the October 7, 1944 "Sonderkommando uprising" of inmates in the Auschwitz-Birkenau concentration camp.

== Life ==
=== Auschwitz Uprising ===
Ruzia Grunapfel was born in Zator, Poland. She was sent to Auschwitz in the 1940s where she was forced to work in the Weichsel-Union-Metalwerke or Union Munitions Plant. Ruzia, along with a number of prisoners including Estusia (Ester) Wajcblum, Hanka (Anna) Wajcblum, Regina Safirsztajn, Ala Gertner, Hadassa Zlotnicka, Marta Bindiger, Genia Fischer, and Inge Frank, worked together to sneak the powder out in kerchiefs stuffed into a pocket or their bosom. If searched, they would dump the powder onto the ground and rub it into the earth with their feet. The woman gave the gunpowder to Roza Robota, a prisoner who worked clothing-detail in Birkenau. Robota then gave the gunpowder to the Sonderkommando, a group of death camp prisoners who were forced to dispose of gas chamber victims in the crematoriums.

On October 7, 1944, the Sonderkommandos used the gunpowder to blow up crematorium IV in Birkenau. Ala, Roza, Ester, and Regina were detained and tortured for their role in the plot. The women were publicly hanged in Birkenau on January 5, 1945. Ruzia survived and was forced to watch the executions. Hanka (Anna) Wajcblum also survived. The fate of the other female prisoners mentioned is unknown. Thirteen days after they died, Auschwitz was closed down by the SS, as they fled from the advance of Russian liberators. Ruzia was on the Death March from Auschwitz to Ravensbrück and was ultimately liberated in Neustadt-Gleve sub-camp of Ravensbrück.

While in the camp, she traded bread for paper so that she could write notes while in Auschwitz, in order to bear witness later, heeding her father's admonition to remember what happened. Some of the surviving notes are in the archives at Yad Vashem.

=== Post World War II ===
Grunapfel emigrated to the US in 1946 aboard the first civilian ship from Europe since the end of World War II. Subsequently, she settled in Bensonhurst, Brooklyn, New York, married Irving Meth, and raised three sons. She spent the last ten years of her life in Kew Gardens Hills, New York.

She died in October 2013. In 2016 her children and grandchildren dedicated a song in her memory, "Rose Meth, The Unsung Heroine".
