= Lily Nicksay =

American actress

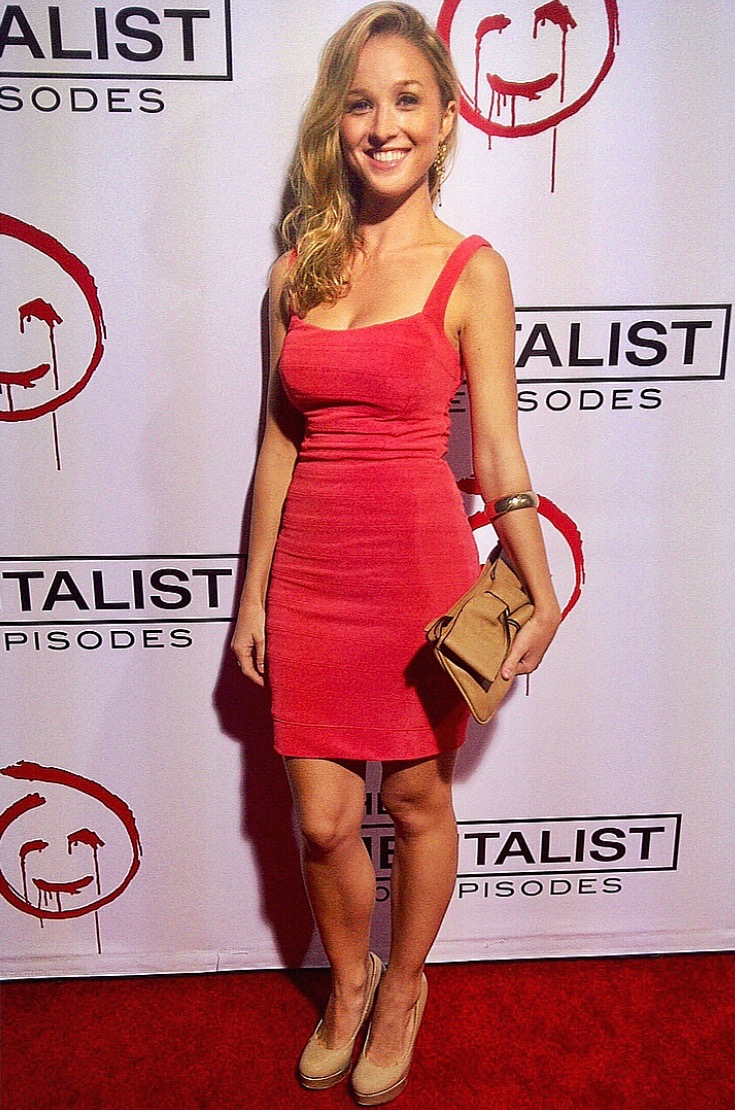
- Nicksay in November 2012
- Education: University of St Andrews (MA)
- Occupation: Actress
- Years active: 1990–present
- Known for: Boy Meets World (seasons 1–2); The Negotiator
- Spouse: Dave Gibson (m. 2015)
- Children: 1

Lily Nicksay is an American actress. She is known for originating the role of Morgan Matthews, Cory's little sister, in the first two seasons of Boy Meets World. She reprised the role for the season 3 finale of Girl Meets World.

== Early years ==
Nicksay was raised in Los Angeles and received her Screen Actors Guild card when she was 4 years old. She graduated from the University of St Andrews, Scotland, with an MA degree in Latin and Ancient Greek.

== Career ==
Nicksay's television credits include guest star appearances on NCIS, The Mentalist, The Guardian, 8 Simple Rules, and Judging Amy. She has also appeared in the feature films The Negotiator, The Adventures of Rocky and Bullwinkle, and Up Close & Personal, and in the 1995 television movie The Christmas Box.

She was seen in a series of UPS commercials, featuring as an operations manager in a company called Gunderman Group.

Nicksay starred as May in the 2017 production of Gulf View Drive, the 2016 production of See Rock City, and the 2015 production of Last Train To Nibroc at the Rubicon Theatre, to rave reviews. (The three plays, all written by Arlene Hutton, are known as The Nibroc Trilogy.) She won the 2017 LA Stage Alliance Ovation Award for Best Lead Actress in a Play for her performance in See Rock City. Gulf View Drive won the 2018 Ovation Award for Best Production (Large Theatre), and Nicksay was nominated for Best Lead Actress in a Play.

== Personal life ==
Nicksay married BMG songwriter Dave Gibson on August 16, 2015. Together they have one son (b. 2021).

== Filmography ==
=== Film ===
Year	Title	Role	Notes
1996	Up Close & Personal	Star Atwater	
1998	The Negotiator	Omar's Daughter	
2000	The Adventures of Rocky & Bullwinkle	Sydney	
2014	You Me & Her	Teenage Opponent	Short film
2014	Next Day Blur	Mean Girl	Short film
2015	Killing Animals	Alice Wolfe	
2015	Pontiac Angel	Angel	Short film
2016	Age of the Moon	Alice Wolfe	Short film
2019	Pizza and Whine	Stephanie	

=== Television ===
Year	Title	Role	Episode
1993–1995	Boy Meets World	Morgan Matthews	38 episodes, 1993–1995
1995	The Christmas Box	Dream Angel	Television film
2000	Judging Amy	Melissa Tory	Episode: "Waterworld"
2001	The Guardian	Lesley Walker	Episode: "Heart"
2002	8 Simple Rules... for Dating My Teenage Daughter	Sabrina	Episode: "Rory's Got a Girlfriend"
2013	The Mentalist	Rose Sutfin	Episode: "Red, White and Blue"
2017	Girl Meets World	Morgan Matthews	Episode: "Girl Meets Goodbye"
2019	NCIS	Clarissa	Episode: "Judge, Jury..."

== Theatre credits ==
Year	Production	Role	Venue
2002	The Wild Duck	Hedvig	A Noise Within/Dir. Adrian Giurgea
2013	Heaven Can Wait	Bette	Glendale Centre Theatre/Dir. James Stevens
2014	The Curse of Oedipus	Ismene	Antaeus Theatre Company/Dir. Casey Stangl
2014	The Trip Back Down	Jan	Whitefire Theatre/Dir. Terri Hanauer
2015	Last Train To Nibroc	May	Rubicon Theatre Company/Dir. Katharine Farmer
2016	And Then They Fell	Cal	Brimmer Street Theatre Company/Dir. Amy Harmon
2016	A Singular They	Burbank	Blank Theatre/Dir. Christopher Raymond
2016	See Rock City	May	Rubicon Theatre Company/Dir. Katharine Farmer
2017	Baby Doll	Baby Doll	Ensemble Theatre Company/Dir. Jenny Sullivan
2017	Gulf View Drive	May	Rubicon Theatre Company/Dir. Katharine Farmer
2019	Measure for Measure	Isabella	Ensemble Theatre Company/Dir. Jonathan Fox
2019	Harvey	Myrtle Mae	Laguna Playhouse/Dir. Andrew Barnicle
2020	Barefoot in the Park	Corie Bratter	Laguna Playhouse/Dir. Michael Matthews

== Awards and nominations ==
Year	Award	Category	Work	Result
2018	Ovation Awards	Best Production of a Play (Large Theatre)	Gulf View Drive	Won
2018	Ovation Awards	Lead Actress in a Play	Gulf View Drive	Nominated
2017	Ovation Awards	Lead Actress in a Play	See Rock City	Won
2017	Stage Raw Awards	Leading Female Performance	A Singular They	Nominated
2016	Santa Barbara Independent Indy Awards	Best Performance	See Rock City	Won
2015	Ovation Awards	Best Production of a Play (Large Theatre)	Last Train To Nibroc	Nominated
2002	Ovation Awards	Featured Actress in a Play	The Wild Duck	Nominated
