= Sala Kirschner =

Holocaust survivor and author (1924–2018)

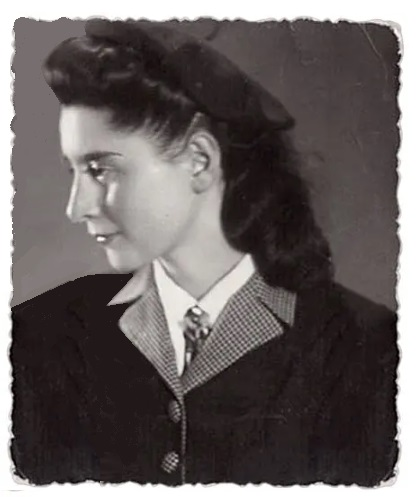
- Born: March 5, 1924; Sosnowiec, Poland
- Died: March 7, 2018 (aged 94); Manhattan, New York, U.S.
- Known for: Sala's Gift
- Spouse: Sidney Kirschner
- Parents: Joseph Garncarz; Chana Garncarz

Sala Kirschner (March 5, 1924 – March 7, 2018) was a Holocaust survivor whose correspondences with her friends and relatives during the Holocaust were turned into a New York Public Library exhibition and later book, Sala's Gift, which chronicled her experiences. The book was translated into seven languages, and turned into a play in 2013 by Arlene Hutton.

== Early life ==
Kirschner was born Sala Garncarz in Sosnowiec, Poland to Joseph Garncarz, a rabbi and teacher, and Chana Garncarz née Feldman. She had eleven siblings, eight of whom were alive in 1940. She attended the religious Beth Jacob schools of Sarah Schenirer and spoke Polish at the public school that she attended, and Yiddish and Hebrew at home.

== The Holocaust ==
When Kirschner was 16, Germany invaded Poland. In 1940, Kirschner's older sister Raizel received a summons to work at a German labor camp; Sala volunteered to go in her sister's place, and on October 28, 1940, was taken to Geppersdorf, where Jewish male laborers built new stretches of the autobahn and women did domestic chores, peeling potatoes and sewing swastikas onto German uniforms. Kirschner spent five years in seven labor campus in the Organisation Schmelt network. Conditions were brutal, but prisoners were allowed to send and receive mail as a propaganda tool. Letters had to be written in German and pass through German censorship.

During this time, she corresponded with many friends and relatives, and kept a short-lived diary. Her letters document life in the camps, including hunger and typhus. The letters also chronicle her friendship with Ala Gertner, who was later hanged in Auschwitz for her role in the 1944 Sonderkommando uprising at Auschwitz, as well as her romantic friendship with Harry Haubenstock. Kirschner saved these letters, hiding them in barracks niches or buried them in soil, even though she risked punishment if they were discovered. She held onto them because they were her only link to a family that she believed she might never see again.

Kirschner was liberated by the Soviet Army on May 7, 1945, and reunited with her two remaining sisters, Blima and Raizel. Her parents had been killed in Auschwitz. She met Sidney Kirschner, a Jewish American soldier, at Rosh Hashanah services shortly after the war ended. They married civilly in Ansbach, Germany on her 22nd birthday in 1946 and in a religious ceremony three months later, on June 7. They moved to East Harlem, Jackson Heights, and then to Monsey, New York where they raised three children.

== Sala's Gift ==
In 1991, before a triple bypass cardiac surgery in which she feared she might die, Sala gave her daughter Ann Kirschner a shoebox containing 350 letters, postcards and photographs from her correspondences during the war, written in Yiddish, Polish, and German. These were put on exhibit at the New York Public Library in 2006. Later that year, Ann Kirschner published Sala's Gift, which documented her mother's experiences. The book was turned into a 2013 play, Letters to Sala, by Arlene Hutton; as of 2018, the play has been performed over 100 times.

== Death and legacy ==
Kirschner died on March 7, 2018, in New York from congestive heart failure. Her husband Sidney died seven months later on October 16. They were survived by their son David and daughter Ann, eight grandchildren, and seven great-grandchildren. They were predeceased by their son Joseph, who died in 2004.
