= Laura Schor =

Laura Schor is a professor of history at Hunter College and the CUNY Graduate Center in New York City. She served as the provost of Hunter College for nine years. She also served as the executive director of Hadassah and was the founding dean of the Macaulay Honors College from its inception in 2001 until its first class graduated in 2005. Schor is on the boards of the Hadassah-Brandeis Institute, the Macaulay Honors College Foundation Board, and the Slim Peace Board.

== Academic work ==
Schor received a PhD in Modern European History from the University of Rochester in 1974. She has published work on the women silk workers of Lyon as well as work on Flora Tristan, Betty de Rothschild, and Edmund de Beaumont. In 2013, she published a biography of Annie Landau, headmistress of the Evelina de Rothschild School in Jerusalem.
