= Sala's Gift =

Account of the Holocaust

Sala's Gift: My Mother's Holocaust Story is an account by Ann Kirschner of her mother Sala's experiences in the Holocaust, based primarily on a collection of letters her mother gave her, that she had received while in Nazi labor camps, written by about 80 correspondents. The most famous of the letter writers was Sala's friend Ala Gertner, who was hanged at Auschwitz for her role in the only armed uprising at the camp.

The original letters and Sala's diary are held by the Dorot Jewish Division of the New York Public Library, and were exhibited to public in 2006. The book was later adapted into a play by Arlene Hutton titled Letters to Sala. The letters have also been the subject of a traveling exhibit. The letters at the NYPL are made available to students and scholars involved with productions of Letters to Sala

The book was published by Simon and Schuster/Free Press in 2006, and has been translated into several languages: in German as Salas Geheiminis, Polish, as Listy z Pudełka, Italian, as Il Dono di Sala, French, as Le Secret de ma mère,, and Chinese.

It was reviewed by the New York Times, and the first chapter was reprinted in that newspaper on Nov. 12, 2006
