= Anna Heilman =

Jewish Resistance fighter and Holocaust survivor (1928–2011)

Anna Heilman holding a picture of her sisters

Anna Heilman, born Hana Wajcblum (December 1, 1928 – May 1, 2011), referred to in other sources as Hanka or Chana Weissman, was one of the surviving prisoners from Auschwitz who plotted to blow up the crematoria. She, along with her elder sister (Estusia) and other women, smuggled gunpowder out of the Union munitions factory. They were then able to pass it from insider to insider until it reached the Sonderkommando. The women involved in the gunpowder smuggling chain include Roza Robota (who had direct contact with the men of the Sonderkommando), Ala Gertner, Regina Safirsztajn, Rose Grunapfel Meth, Hadassa Zlotnicka, Marta Bindiger, Genia Fischer, and Inge Frank, among others.

== Early life ==
Anna's parents, Jakub and Rebeka Wajcblum, were both deaf. She was born on December 1, 1928, into a middle-class assimilated Jewish family in Warsaw, Poland. She had two older sisters, Sabina and Estusia. All three children had normal hearing and they had a nanny when they were young who was also deaf. Jakub was born in Warsaw in 1887 and he owned a factory (Snycerpol) in Warsaw that employed deaf workers to make wooden handicrafts. In 1937, he exhibited the factory's items at the Paris Exposition and in 1939 he did so at the New York World's Fair. Her mother, Rebeka, was born in 1898 in Pruzany, Poland to a wealthy family.

== World War II ==
The family lived in an area that became part of the Warsaw Ghetto. They were located on 38 Mila Street, just down the street from the headquarters of the ŻOB (Żydowska Organizacja Bojowa - Jewish Fighting Organization), led by Mordecai Anielewicz. Sabina managed to escape the Holocaust together with her former tutor and future husband, Mietek. They went to the Soviet Union and then settled in Sweden.

Anna was part of a youth movement Hashomer Hatzair. As the Warsaw Ghetto Uprising got underway, she wasn't sure whether to fight or to stay with her parents; She ultimately chose to stay with her parents. Anna, Estusia and their parents were among the last deportees from the Warsaw Ghetto when they were taken to Maidanek concentration camp in May 1943. Anna's parents were immediately murdered when they got to Maidanek. Estusia and Anna were sent to Auschwitz in September 1943.

== Resistance during the war ==
In her online memoir, Heilman claims it was her own idea to smuggle the gun powder to the Sonderkommando. A quote from her online memoir: "Out of this friendship evolved the ideas of resistance. I can't tell you who initiated it ... The idea was what could we do, each one of us, to resist? I thought, "You are working in the Pulverraum. How about taking gunpowder?" We started to talk about the idea. The gunpowder was within our reach. We thought, "We can use it!" Somebody in the group knew that the Sonderkommando was preparing resistance. We said, "Let us give the gunpowder to them!""

They found many ways to smuggle powder out. In order to smuggle the power out, they had pouches on the inside of their dresses, knots in their headscarves, and sometimes even powder under their fingernails. They were regularly searched and she recounted that when they saw from a distance that they would be searched, they would let the powder out onto the ground, and mingled it into the soil so that it could not be seen.

Estusia was betrayed when Ala Gertner told an SS officer whom she had befriended and trusted about the plot. She, Roza Robota, Regina Stafirstajn, and Ala Gertner were taken to the "Bunker" inside the main camp and tortured for months. But during all this time, they never gave up Anna's name. They only gave names of Sonderkommando members who were already dead.

On January 5, 1945, Estusia, Regina, Ala and Roza were hanged.

This was only two weeks before the advancing Soviet Red Army reached Auschwitz. The entire women's camp was forced to watch the executions. With direct orders from Berlin, the women were executed as Jewish resistance fighters. Auschwitz was evacuated on January 18, 1945, as the Soviet Army continued its advance towards Germany.

== After the war ==
After a brief stay in Belgium, Anna emigrated in May 1946 to Palestine under the British Mandate. Anna was reunited with Sabina, met her extended family, and finished high school. Anna married Joshua Heilman on March 7, 1947, a man who had left Poland for Mandatory Palestine to pursue his university studies one week before the outbreak of World War II. His entire family was murdered during the war except for his younger sister, Rose, who had survived Auschwitz.

While in Israel, Anna obtained a degree in social work and had two daughters with Joshua. Joshua moved to the United States to be a Hebrew teacher and eventually brought the rest of the family to Boston in 1958. Then, in 1960, they emigrated to Ottawa, Canada so Joshua could become a Hebrew school principal. Anna worked with The Children's Aid Society in Ottawa as a bilingual (English-French) social worker. She became the supervisor of the English-French unit and eventually retired in 1990. Joshua Heilman died in October 2005.

The road to writing her memoirs was quite long. In 1991, after a ceremony at Yad Vashem to dedicate a memorial to Estusia, Regina, Ala and Roza, Anna told her son-in-law, Sheldon Schwartz, that she had kept a Polish diary in Auschwitz. It was confiscated and destroyed during a search at some point; and she recreated the entire diary from memory in a displaced persons camp in 1945. Sheldon persuaded Anna to translate the diary into English and the two of them worked together for 10 years; she wrote and he edited. Her memoir, Never Far Away: The Auschwitz Chronicles of Anna Heilman, was published in 2001. The book won the 2002 Ottawa Book Award.

Anna Heilman is one of those featured in Unlikely Heroes, a 2003 film about Jewish resistance during World War II.
