= Mary C. Pearl =

Mary Corliss Pearl (born July 5, 1950) is an environmental scientist and Dean Emerita of William E. Macaulay Honors College. She was appointed by Chancellor Milliken in September 2016, and served until August 2021. Formerly, Dr. Pearl served as the first dean and administrative vice president of Stony Brook University Southampton. Before coming to Macaulay Honors College, she was CEO of The Garrison Institute.

== Education ==
Pearl received her bachelor's degree from Yale University in 1972 and her Master of Philosophy, also from Yale, in 1976 and Doctor of Philosophy, again from Yale, in 1982.

== Career ==
From 1984 to 1993, Pearl was director for Asia and Pacific and administrator for conservation programs at the Wildlife Conservation Society. From 1994 to February 2009, she was president of Wildlife Trust/Ecohealth Alliance. During this time Pearl served on the faculty of the New York Times Institute for Environmental Journalists.

In March 2009, she became the administrative vice president and dean at SUNY Stony Brook Southampton . She left this position in July 2010 to become chief executive officer of the Garrison Institute, a research and retreat center. In 2011, she taught at the School of Visual Arts in the Masters Program for Design for Social Innovation.

In May 2012, Pearl joined the City University of New York. Pearl held positions as chief academic officer and associate dean at the William E. Macaulay Honors College and professor of biology at Brooklyn College. She simultaneously held the positions of senior research scientist at Columbia University, based at the Center for Environment Economy and Society. In March 2014, she was appointed provost at Macaulay. In February 2016, when the former dean, Dr. Ann Kirschner, was named special advisor to CUNY Chancellor James Milliken, Pearl was named interim dean for Macaulay. In September 2016, Chancellor Milliken named her dean.

== Honors ==
She is a founding member of the Higher Education Group of the Rainforest Alliance, New York City, 1988. Trustee Gomez Foundation, 1985-2000. Elected Fellow of the American Association for the Advancement of Science. Board member of the Institute for Ecological Research (Brazil), Ecohealth Society, Society for Conservation Biology (board governor 1990-1993), International Union for Conservation of Nature (primate specialist group species survival commission), International Women's Forum, and the Belizean Grove. She received an honorary Doctor of Science degree from Marist College in 2006.

== Bibliography ==
- Ralls, Katherine. "Conservation for the Twenty-First Century." Science 247.4939 (1990): 224. Academic OneFile. Web. 18 Oct. 2016.
- Pearl, Mary C., and Paul Rodewald. "The Expendable Future: U.S. Politics and the Protection of Biological Diversity." Ecology 72.5 (1991): 1905+. Academic OneFile. Web. 18 Oct. 2016
