= William E. Macaulay =

American businessman (1945–2019)

- Born: September 2, 1945; New York City, U.S.
- Died: November 26, 2019 (aged 74); Cleveland, Ohio, U.S.
- Education: The City College of New York
- Alma mater: Wharton School of the University of Pennsylvania
- Title: Chairman, First Reserve Corporation
- Term: 2004-2019
- Board member of: Dresser-Rand Group; Weatherford International
- Spouse: Linda Rodger (until his death)
- Children: 2

William Edward Macaulay (September 2, 1945 – November 26, 2019) was an American billionaire businessman, and the CEO and chairman of First Reserve Corporation, the world's largest private equity fund specialized in the energy industry, with $21.5 billion under management.

== Early life ==
Raised in The Bronx borough of New York City, Macaulay spent "rough days" at DeWitt Clinton High School, afflicted by overcrowding and ethnic tensions. Macaulay graduated with a bachelor's degree in economics from City College of New York and an MBA from the Wharton School at the University of Pennsylvania, where he also served as a member of the executive board. He was chairman of the Rogosin Institute, and chairman of the advisory board of The City University of New York.

== Career ==
Macaulay, chairman of First Reserve Corporation, was with the firm since its founding in 1983 until his death in 2019. He was responsible for supervision of all aspects of the firm's investment program and strategy, as well as overall management of the firm.

Prior to acquiring First Reserve with John Hill in 1983, Macaulay was a co-founder of Meridien Capital Company, a private equity buyout firm. From 1972 to 1982, Macaulay was with Oppenheimer & Co, where he served as director of corporate finance with responsibility for investing Oppenheimer's capital in private equity transactions. At Oppenheimer, he also served as a general partner and member of the management committee of Oppenheimer & Co, as well as president of Oppenheimer Energy Corporation. He was the founder and largest stockholder of Peppermill Oil Company.

Macaulay was ranked in the top 400 richest American list by Forbes.

In September 2006, Macaulay donated $30 million to the City University of New York, (the largest single donation in its history), to purchase a brownstone at 35 West 67th Street that would house The William E. Macaulay Honors College, and to create an endowment to support the college.

== Personal life ==
Macaulay was married to Linda Rodger, with two children, two grandchildren, and lived in Greenwich, Connecticut. He died on November 26, 2019, at the age of 74 in Cleveland from a heart attack.

Linda introduced Bill to ornithology and bird recordings, and they were supporters of the Macaulay Library of birdsong.
