= Regina Safirsztajn =

Jewish resistance fighter (1915–1945)

Regina Safirsztajn (1915 – 5 January 1945) was a Jewish resistance fighter in the Auschwitz underground. She helped to plan and implement the Sonderkommando revolt of 7 October 1944. She was executed at Auschwitz-Birkenau along with three other women for her role in the operation.

== Life ==
=== Family ===
Regina was born in 1915 in Bedzin, Poland, to Josef and Roza Safirsztajn. Her father ran a restaurant and bar in the front of their home.

Regina was the seventh of eight children. Her siblings were Chana Gitla, Mordechai, Isaak, Ezel, Toniam, Cesia, and David. The children attended Polish schools and spoke Yiddish at home.

=== Bedzin ghetto ===
Regina and her family, with the exception of Mordechai who had immigrated to the United States, were forced into in Bedzin ghetto, where Regina's father died of a heart attack. Her mother had died prior to the family's time in the ghetto.

While in the ghetto, Regina married Josef Szaintal who died soon after they wed.

=== Auschwitz Uprising ===
In August 1943, Regina, her sister, her sisters-in-law and their children were deported to Auschwitz where the family was separated. Most family members were killed immediately and a few were selected for forced work duty. Regina was sentenced to work in the Weichsel-Union-Metalwerke or Union Munitions Plant where she served a forewoman of the gunpowder room.

Regina joined the resistance while working in the munitions plant. She, along with other prisoners including Ala Gertner, sisters Esterka (Ester) and Anna Wajcblum, and Rose Grunapfel Meth smuggled gunpowder out of the factory and gave it to resistance fighter, Roza Robota. Roza, a prisoner who worked clothing-detail in Birkenau, then gave the gunpowder to the Sonderkommando, a group of death camp prisoners who were forced to dispose of gas chamber victims in the crematoriums.

On 7 October 1944, during Auschwitz Sonderkommando revolt, the Sonderkommandos used gunpowder to blow up crematorium IV in Birkenau. Ala, Roza, Ester, and Regina were detained and tortured for their role in the plot. The women were publicly hanged at Auschwitz-Birkenau on 5 January 1945.

Regina's brother Mordechai, who had immigrated to the United States, and her niece, Rose Rechnic (Roza Ickowicz), were Regina's only family members to survive The Holocaust.
