= Fathom.com =

Online learning website developed by Columbia University

Fathom
- Website type: Online learning
- Owner: Columbia University
- Website: fathom.com
- Commercial: Yes
- Launched: November 15, 2000; 25 years ago
- Current status: Closed March 31, 2003; currently offline

Fathom was an online learning portal project, spearheaded by Columbia University, that opened to the public in late 2000. Partners in the venture included the London School of Economics and Political Science, the British Library, the New York Public Library, Cambridge University Press, and the Smithsonian Institution's National Museum of Natural History. Failing to turn a profit despite a 2002 business plan change, Fathom closed in early 2003.

== Early history ==
In the late 1990s, Columbia University, led by executive vice provost Michael M. Crow, sought a way to use the emerging World Wide Web as a strategic tool for extending higher education's reach to the public. The university hired Ann Kirschner in late 1998 to help develop this plan. Over a one-year period starting in January 1999, Crow and Kirschner quickly drew up the blueprint for Fathom, hoping to gain a first-mover advantage over potential competitors.

On April 11, 2000, The Fathom Network Inc. incorporated in Delaware, changing its name to Fathom Knowledge Network Inc. shortly afterward. On November 15, 2000, Fathom opened to the public as a "preview site".

=== Vision ===
Crow and Kirschner conceived Fathom.com as an online learning community for general audiences who desired the experience of "'[...] being at a great university or a great museum'" without having to attend one in person. Concerned by the initial success of Microsoft's Encarta encyclopedia, they also saw Fathom as a proactive defense against losing valuable faculty members to other online education projects.

As an Internet hub of educational resources and interactive learning activities, Fathom aimed to distinguish itself from other university-led online learning initiatives. Their plan called for a) a broad range of multimedia educational content designed specifically for the website, not limited to course syllabi and resources (hence the partnership with archival institutions); and b) interactive features such as forums, collaborative learning tools and groups, and expert-led discussions. In these ways, Fathom's ambitions reached beyond the course-confined materials and limited interaction of more familiar online learning initiatives by universities, like MIT's OpenCourseWare.

In regards to Fathom's ambitious scope of content, Fathom's CEO Ann Kirschner is quoted in a press release as saying, "Today, most initiatives by educational institutions are focused on courses. Courses are important, and courses for distance learning will be one of the offerings provided by some partners through Fathom. But learning is not limited to the classroom, and the many other types of content provided through Fathom will provide a more complete and accessible context for knowledge. We believe that Fathom will define the transformation of the online learning category into a broader interactive knowledge marketplace."

=== The consortium ===
As a for-profit consortium, Fathom could compete for highly skilled Web developers, offer students a wide variety of courses, and allow Columbia to cooperate with participating institutions rather than work against them. Although members of the consortium were required to distribute their online content exclusively through Fathom.com, financial contribution was not a condition of membership.

The London School of Economics and Political Science was Columbia's initial partner, followed by Cambridge University Press, the British Library, the Smithsonian Institution's National Museum of Natural History, and the New York Public Library. Within six months, seven additional institutions joined the consortium: four US institutions (the University of Chicago, the American Film Institute, the RAND Corporation, and the Woods Hole Oceanographic Institution) and three UK museums (the Natural History Museum, the Science Museum, and the Victoria and Albert Museum). The final member institution, the University of Michigan, joined on November 15, 2000, bringing the total number of member institutions to 14.

== Courses offered ==
Fathom initially planned to offer only courses produced by its members, which failed to produce courses quickly enough to meet benchmarks set out in its original business plan. Consequently, as announced in September 2000, Fathom decided to allow non-member "content partners", including the University of Florida and the University of Washington, to sell courses through its website.

The specific types and styles of academic courses, marketed using the institutions' brands, varied widely. Courses were text-based yet included primary source documents, animations, interactive graphics, audio slide shows, and streaming videos.

Although Fathom offered many free seminars, some courses cost over $500 and offered credit toward a degree. For example, The New York Times reported an "Introduction to Macroeconomics" course from the University of Washington cost $670.

In 2002, Fathom tweaked its business model to generate additional revenue. Specifically, Fathom began to develop non-academic courses in collaboration with organizations as MasterCard International and AARP. Fathom also expanded its focus from degree programs to corporate training and continuing education.

== Demise ==
Columbia University closed the for-profit corporation on March 31, 2003, keeping the web site's free content online until mid-2012. Although Columbia invested $25 million in the venture, and 65,000 people created accounts, Fathom failed to turn a profit, partly because few customers paid for any of the courses.

Educational technology scholars Bush and Mott cite Fathom as an example of a handful of "very thoughtful educational technology 'solutions,'" including the University of Illinois's Global Campus, which "failed to meet their stated goal of expanding educational opportunities, most likely because they did not align with student needs, and, hence, were not financially viable."
