= Ester Wajcblum =

Jewish resistance fighter and Holocaust victim (1924–1945)

- Ester Wajcblum, 1937
- Born: 16 January 1924; Warsaw, Poland
- Died: 5 January 1945 (aged 20); Birkenau
- Cause of death: Execution by hanging
- Known for: Sonderkommando revolt

Ester (Estusia/Esterka) Wajcblum (16 January 1924 – 5 January 1945) was a Jewish resistance fighter in the Auschwitz underground and one of four women hanged in the Auschwitz concentration camp for her role in the Sonderkommando revolt of 7 October 1944.

== Life ==
=== Family ===
Ester was born to Jakub and Rebeka (née Jaglom) Wajcblum in Warsaw, Poland. She had an older sister, Sabina, and a younger sister, Hanka Wajcblum (Anna Heilman).

=== Warsaw Ghetto ===
The family, with the exception of Sabina who had married and left Poland, was forced into the Warsaw Ghetto and in May 1943 were deported to Majdanek where Ester and Hanka's parents were killed.

=== Auschwitz Uprising ===
Ester and Hanka were transferred to Auschwitz-Birkenau in September 1943. Upon arrival, they were assigned to forced labor in the Weichsel-Union-Metalwerke (Union Munitions Plant) gunpowder room.

The sisters joined the resistance while working in the munitions plant. Ester, along with Hanka and fellow prisoners including Ala Gertner, Regina Safirsztajn, and Rose Grunapfel Meth smuggled gunpowder out of the factory and gave it to resistance fighter, Roza Robota. Roza, a prisoner who worked clothing-detail in Birkenau, then gave the gunpowder to the Sonderkommando, a group of death camp prisoners who were forced to dispose of the bodies of people murdered in the gas chamber in the crematoriums.

On 7 October 1944 the Sonderkommandos used the gunpowder to blow up Crematorium IV in Birkenau. Ala, Roza, Ester, and Regina were detained and tortured for their role in the plot. The women were publicly hanged in Birkenau on 5 January 1945. Hanka survived and was transferred to a sub-camp of Ravensbrück called Neustadt Glewe. The camp was liberated in May 1945 when Hanka was sixteen years old.
