= Lola L. Szladits =

American librarian (1923–1990)

Lola L. Szladits (1923–1990) was an American librarian. She was the curator of New York Public Library's Berg Collection of English and American Literature for twenty years.

== Career ==
Szladits went to work for the NYPL in 1955, and was named curator of the Berg Collection in 1969. As a curator, Szladits emphasized the Berg as a living research collection, rather than a museum. She greatly expanded the collection's manuscript holdings, collecting the notebooks and diaries, as well as published works and correspondence, of many modern authors. During her time as curator, she was responsible for planning and executing thirty-five exhibitions sharing "the appeal and richness of literature," as well as composing their accompanying catalogues.

She was often referred to simply as "Lola," and reportedly treated the authors whose manuscripts she cared for with the same familiarity, referring to "Tom," "Wystan," and "Virginia" (i.e., T.S. Eliot, W.H. Auden, and Virginia Woolf). She was devoted to her work, and could be charming and helpful, but also "legendary" and "terrifying" to librarians and scholars alike. David H. Stam, who worked under her and fifteen years later as her supervisor, described her as "a dictatorial and mercurial boss and a conspiratorial subordinate." In a book on the Bloomsbury Group, Regina Marler describes her as a "fierce... guardian" of Virginia Woolf's papers, and relates an anecdote from scholar Ellen Hawkes, who recalls Szladits as "pushing and pulling the fans, opening the roof vents for more air, and even crawling into the attic to inspect the pipes" during a New York heat wave. Ann Kirschner remembered her as "brilliant, bossy, impossible Lola Szladits," describing "a life lived in service to an institution, inspiring, uncompromising."

Szladits was a member of the Grolier Club, and served several terms on their Library Committee. She was also a member of the Hroswitha Club. She sat on the Board of the Keats-Shelley Association of America, and was a member of many library organizations, including the Library Council of the Rosenbach Foundation, the Council of the Dictionary of Literary Biography, the Friends of the Columbia Libraries, and Council of the Friends of the Princeton University Library. She was the first librarian to be profiled in the New Yorker.

== Personal life ==
Lola Leontin Szladits was born in Budapest in 1923. She studied English and French literature in Budapest, and wrote her doctorate on the psychological effects of children's literature. Later, she undertook post-graduate work at The Sorbonne, University College London (from which she received a diploma in librarianship), and Columbia University. She spent time in both the United States and in England, where she met and married Charles Szladits (1911–1986). In 1955, Charles and Lola returned to the United States, and she became a naturalized citizen in 1956.

Her husband Charles was a professor of law at Columbia University, known for Szladits' Bibliography on Foreign and Comparative Law; he died in 1986. Lola Szladits died at her home in Manhattan on 30 March 1990.
