= University of Illinois Global Campus =

- Type: Non-profit, Public, Online
- Established: 2007
- Location: Office and administrators in Urbana–Champaign and Chicago, Illinois, USA
- Website: global.uillinois.edu

The University of Illinois Global Campus was an online university education experiment created by the University of Illinois system. It was established in March 2007, with the goal to allow students who can't accustom to standard colleges the chance to get a University of Illinois education. The trustees of the university voted to phase out the project in early 2009.

== History ==
In January 2008, the University of Illinois system launched The Global Campus, the University's newest initiative in online education. The University Board of Trustees established The Global Campus in March 2007 to further the land-grant mission to expand educational opportunities for the Illinois community and beyond with distance education technologies. The University of Illinois Global Campus was intended to serve nontraditional and placebound students, in order that they may gain the academic and career benefits of a University of Illinois education without the barriers of location and scheduled class times.

All degree and certificate programs were created in collaboration with the colleges and academic departments at the University's residential campuses at Urbana-Champaign, Chicago, and Springfield. The curricula were developed by University of Illinois faculty.

The Global Campus offered degrees and certificates in Business Administration, E-Learning, Nursing, Patient Safety Leadership, and Recreation, Sport and Tourism.

In May 2009, the board of trustees voted to phase out the Global Campus Initiative. The University of Illinois transitioned the programs developed by the Global Campus to academic units on the corresponding residential campuses.

Educational technology scholars Bush and Mott cite Global Campus as an example of a handful of "very thoughtful educational technology 'solutions,'" including Columbia University's Fathom.com, which "failed to meet their stated goal of expanding educational opportunities, most likely because they did not align with student needs, and, hence, were not financially viable."

== See also ==
- University of Illinois system
