= Annie Landau =

English educator

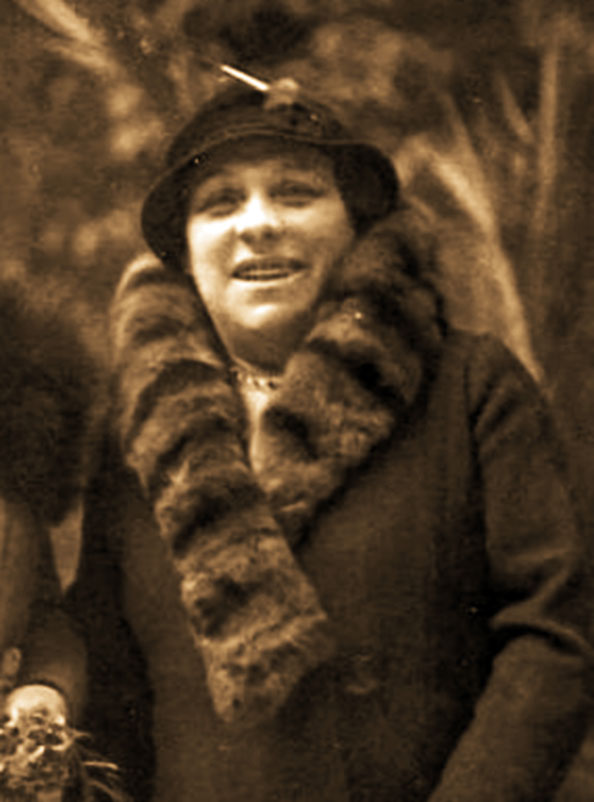
- Born: 20 March 1874; London, England
- Died: 23 January 1945 (aged 70)
- Known for: Headmistress of the Evelina de Rothschild School
- Parents: Chaya Landau; Marcus Landau

Annie Landau (חנה יהודית לנדאו) (20 March 1873 – 23 January 1945) headed the Evelina de Rothschild School in Jerusalem from 1899 until her death in 1945. She was appointed a Member of the Order of the British Empire (MBE) by King George VI in the 1924 Birthday Honours in recognition of her service.

== Early life ==
Landau was born to Chaya and Marcus Landau, strict Orthodox Jews who were active in the Jewish community. She attended the Bishopsgate Ward School for elementary school, a school established by reformers of women's education after the 1869 Endowed School Act and supported by the wife of Mayer Amschel de Rothschild. For high school, due to the lack of religious Jewish girls' schools in London, she attended Rabbi Samson Rafael Hirsch's Jewish High School for Girls in Frankfurt on the Main. This time was a formative period for her. Landau learned Jewish studies and secular studies simultaneously, as well as concepts of Jewish education. After getting a teacher's certificate at the Graystoke Teachers' Training College in 1894, she became a teacher in London at the Westminster Jews' Free School, a Jewish school that took government exams and maintained modern education methods and standards.

== Administration of the Evelina de Rothschild School ==
The Evelina de Rothschild School was established as the first Jewish school for girls in Palestine by Baron Lionel de Rothschild in 1867. It was taken over in 1892 by the Anglo-Jewish Association, who desired to influence the developing cultural character of the region, although the Baron continued to contribute towards its upkeep. In 1898, seeking trained teachers to improve the educational and hygienic standards of the school, the Anglo-Jewish Association hired 25-year-old Landau to be the school's assistant headmistress. When the headmistress resigned in 1899, Landau was appointed its new headmistress. Landau submitted annual formal reports to the Ladies' Committee of the Anglo-Jewish Association, which included information about the state of the school's finances as well as the progress of the students.

=== 1898-1913 ===
The Evelina School grew under Landau's administration. In 1899, Landau's first year as headmistress, there were 292 students in the school and 225 children in kindergarten; by 1903, there were 333 students in the school and 273 in the kindergarten. Although the school was constantly faced with a shortage of space and funds, Landau added teachers to the school staff and incorporated new courses in practical domestic skills into the curriculum. She began a campaign to emphasize health, cleanliness and hygiene among the Evelina School students, especially due to the cholera, meningitis, and scarlet fever epidemics that occasionally spread throughout Jerusalem. During one epidemic the Evelina School was ordered to stay open, as medical authorities felt its premises were cleaner than the students' houses.

Landau worked tirelessly to find work for Evelina School graduates. She encouraged her graduates to be self-reliant; Landau knew that girls with jobs often married later, in their upper teens instead of at twelve or thirteen. The Evelina School offered courses and employment opportunities for its graduates, whether in education or domestic skills such as lace-making and needlework.

Students started the day with communal Jewish prayer. Classes were held on Sundays through Thursdays, instead of Mondays through Fridays, so that religious students could help their families prepare for Shabbat. On Thursday afternoons the school held Kabbalat Shabbat ceremonies, where Landau spoke to the students about the week's Torah portion. Despite the school's Jewish character, Landau came under fire from Ashkenazi rabbis, who felt that secular knowledge would lead the students to abandon religion. At the same time, the Zionists resented Landau's school for teaching both Hebrew and English and demanded that it teach only Hebrew, which Landau resisted. Notably, the Evelina School did not participate in the 1913 Palestinian Language Strike, when advocates of Hebrew language instruction urged the closing of all Jewish schools to back their cause.

=== World War I ===
During World War I, all British citizens in Palestine were given the choice of becoming Ottoman subjects or leaving the country. As an English citizen, Landau left Palestine in 1915 for Alexandria, leaving Ella Schwartzstein as acting headmistress. In Alexandria, Landau worked with the Anglo-Egyptian authorities to provide schooling and social services for hundreds of refugee children from Palestine and Syria.

During the war, most of the teachers in the Evelina School were forced to leave and the school did not have the funds to continue operating. In 1916, the Turkish authorities in Palestine closed the school and the building was used to quarter soldiers. Landau was the first woman permitted to return to Jerusalem after General Edmund Allenby captured Jerusalem; when Landau insisted, military governor of Jerusalem Ronald Storrs, returned the school building to Anglo-Jewish Association.

=== 1918-1945 ===
Landau's work as headmistress continued from her return to Jerusalem in 1918 through her death in 1945. During these years, new subjects were added to the school, especially secretarial skills that were needed by the British administration. The growth of the student body, especially the arrival of German girls in the 1930s, presented new challenges. In her later years, the Evelina School created a branch of Henrietta Szold's Youth Aliyah program and established the Schwartzstein dormitory.

== Personal life ==
Landau was a religious Orthodox Jew and opposed the missionary schools in Jerusalem. She never married. She remained close to her siblings and their children, including her nephew Oliver Sacks and returned annually to visit her family in London. Her close friends were Evelina School teachers who had come from England.

== Death and legacy ==
Landau died on 23 January 1945. She is buried on the Mount of Olives, near Henrietta Szold.

Landau was profiled in Dr. Laura Schor's The Best School in Jerusalem: Annie Landau’s School for Girls 1900-1960 (2013).
