= William E. Macaulay Honors College =

College at the City University of New York

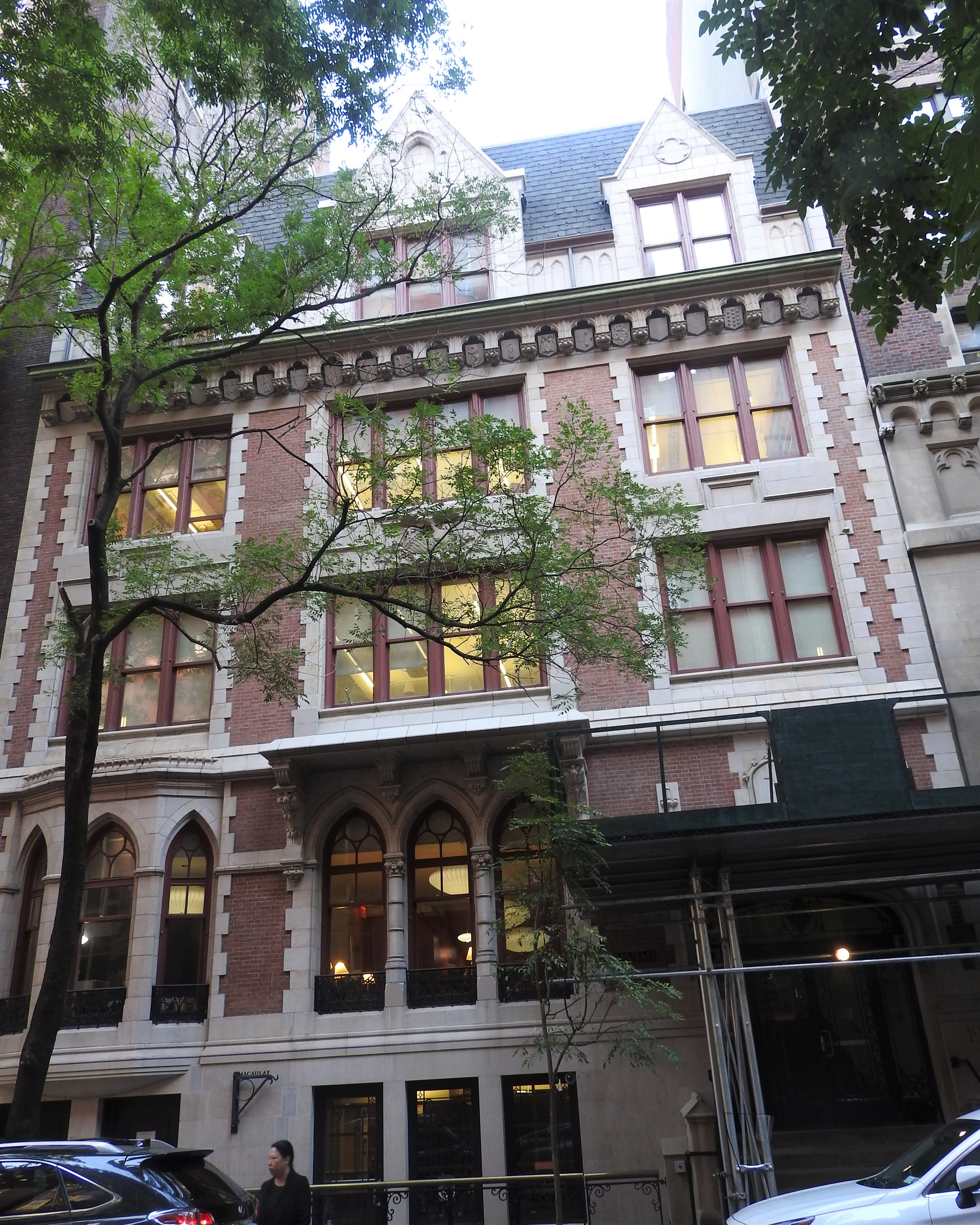
- Type: Public
- Established: 2001, graduated first class in 2005
- Affiliations: City University of New York
- Dean: Dara N. Byrne
- Students: 2,112
- Undergraduates: 2,112
- Location: 35 West 67th Street, New York City, New York, United States; 40.7740°N 73.9802°W
- Campus: Urban
- Colours: Red White Gray Black
- Nicknames: Macaulay, Mac, MHC
- Mascot: Mountain Lion
- Website: www.macaulay.cuny.edu

William E. Macaulay Honors College, commonly referred to as Macaulay Honors College or Macaulay, is the honors college of the City University of New York (CUNY) system in New York City. It was founded in 2001 as CUNY Honors College.

== Founding and history ==
Macaulay was first conceived by Matthew Goldstein as an independent institution within the City University of New York. The aim of its creation was to increase educational standards and foster university-wide collaboration and excellence. Support for existing honors programs at CUNY colleges, in spite of institutional opposition, resulted in the 2001 launch of CUNY Honors College in collaboration with a number of CUNY's senior colleges. Initially, there were five college partners: Baruch, Brooklyn, City, Hunter, and Queens Colleges. Later on, Lehman College, College of Staten Island, and John Jay College were added. Commonly known as Macaulay Honors College University Scholars Program, it graduated its first class in 2005.

Laura Schor, Professor of History at Hunter College and the CUNY Graduate Center, was Macaulay Honors College's founding dean. In July 2006, Ann Kirschner, a graduate of SUNY Buffalo, University of Virginia, and Princeton University, was appointed Dean of Macaulay Honors College. In September 2006, The City University of New York received a $30,000,000 gift from philanthropist and City College alumnus William E. Macaulay, the chairman and chief executive officer of First Reserve Corporation. It is the largest single donation in the history of CUNY and helped finance the purchase of a building on the Upper West Side of Manhattan that has become the permanent home of Macaulay Honors College, and will add support to its endowment. A new governance plan, approved by the CUNY Board of Trustees in late April 2010, provided Macaulay Honors College with degree-granting authority through CUNY's Graduate Center. Beginning in Spring 2011, graduates became eligible to receive a dual degree from both their home college and Macaulay Honors College. In August 2016, Chancellor James B. Milliken named Mary C. Pearl as dean of Macaulay Honors College.

== Academics ==
Each Macaulay student is designated a University Scholar and receives:

- A full-tuition scholarship (tuition waiver); students must meet CUNY's New York state residency requirements for in-state tuition to receive the full tuition scholarship
- Dedicated, specialized advisors through the Macaulay Advising Program
- A NYC cultural passport card that offers free and/or discounted admission to some cultural institutions around the city

=== Students ===
Macaulay Honors College students have won numerous local and national awards, such as the Harry S. Truman Scholarship, the Rhodes Scholarship, Schwarzman Scholarship, the Intel Science Talent Search, The Barry Goldwater, the Jeannette K. Watson Fellowship, Fulbright Fellowship, Bienecke Fellowship, Salk Fellowship, and the Benjamin A. Gilman International Scholarship.

== Admissions ==
Macaulay Honors College accepts applications from high school seniors entering the freshman class. Macaulay does not accept transfer students or applicants applying for mid-term entry. The college advises applicants to research the eight CUNY senior colleges which participate in Macaulay prior to submitting an application. Applicants to Macaulay are then considered for acceptance to the undergraduate degree program at the CUNY campus designated on their applications.

== Campus ==
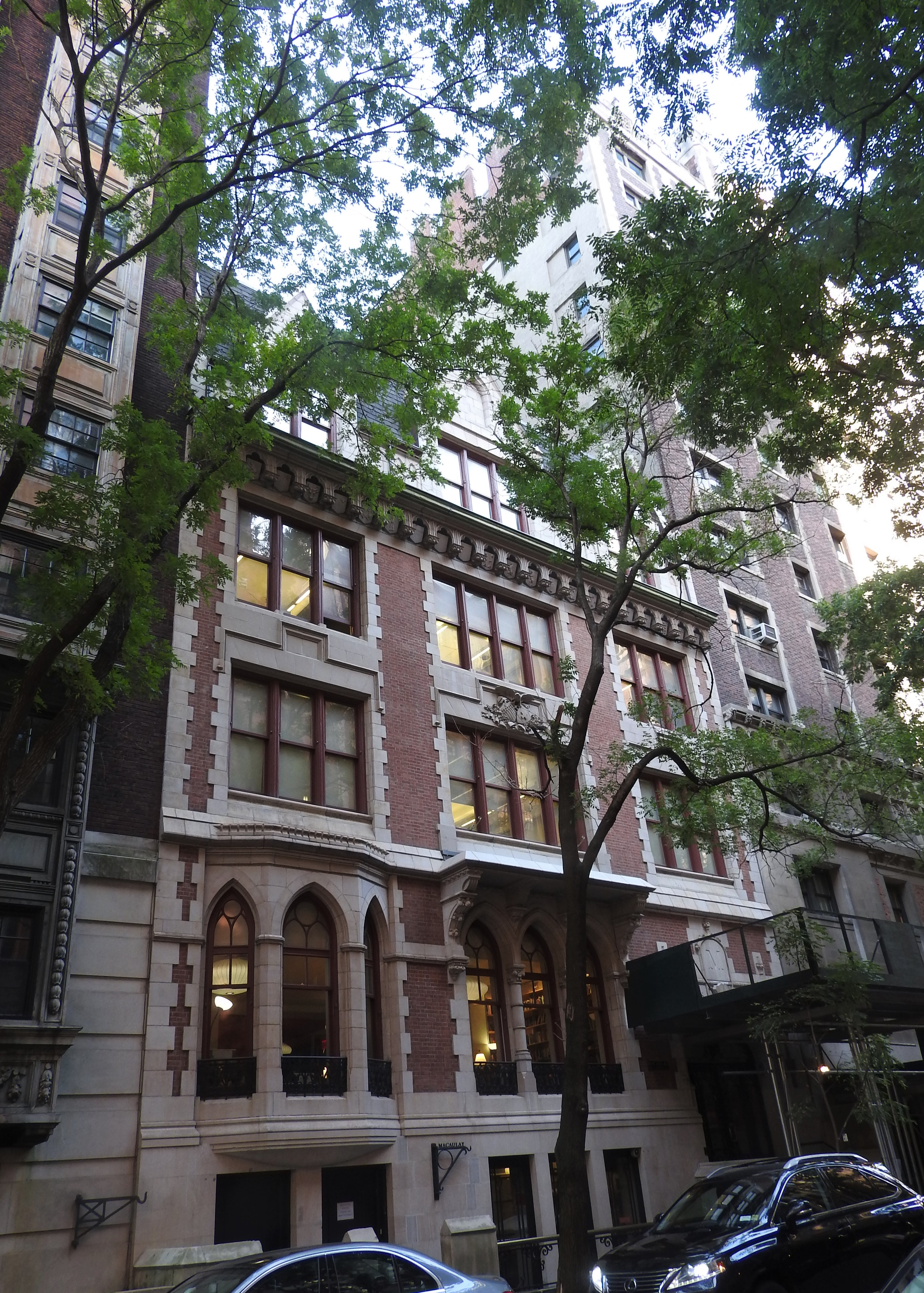
The Macaulay Honors College building at 35 West 67th Street

Located at 35 West 67th Street, Macaulay Honors College is half a block from Central Park and three blocks from Lincoln Center for the Performing Arts in Manhattan's Upper West Side.

=== Building ===
After the building was completed in 1904, 35 West 67th Street housed the Swiss Benevolent Society for numerous years and was known as the Swiss Home. In 1999, it became known as the Steinhardt Building after undergoing extensive restoration and renovation under the direction of philanthropist Michael Steinhardt. Following the completion of the Steinhardt Building's refurbishment, the 92nd Street Y received the building as a donation in 2001 from Steinhardt. The building was placed on sale in 2006.

The Gothic Revival building was purchased with the donation of the Macaulay family and underwent extensive renovations to prepare it for students and staff. Renovations are now complete and the building is in use by the students and staff of Macaulay Honors College. Other CUNY students are welcomed as long as they present valid ID.

==== Interior ====
Inside the Macaulay Honors College building, there is a lecture hall, performance space, screening room, and commons. There are also multiple classrooms where students can collaborate on projects and study. Student Lounge Volunteers (SLVs) organize events and are available to answer questions and support students.

== After Macaulay ==
Some Macaulay alumni have pursued careers in major New York firms, such as BBC Worldwide Americas, Bloomberg, and Google. Macaulay graduates also have pursued graduate degrees at universities such as Harvard, Yale, Princeton, Cornell, Columbia, CUNY Graduate Center, Rutgers, Caltech, Stanford, University of California, Berkeley, Duke, and Oxford.

== Notable people ==
=== Alumni ===
- Anthony Volodkin (2007) — founder of The Hype Machine
- Colby Minifie (2014) — actress

=== Current faculty ===
- Carmen Boullosa — Mexican poet, novelist, and playwright; featured as a visiting professor teaching the course The Mouth: Spanish-Speaking Women Writers from the 1500s to the 1970s
- Edwin G. Burrows — research historian, Pulitzer Prize winning-author, Distinguished Professor of History, Brooklyn College
- Nathan Lents — scientist and author, director of the John Jay College Macaulay Program
- David Petraeus — visiting professor at Macaulay, teaching a course called The Coming North American Decades
- Harold Varmus — Nobel-prize winning scientist, former director of National Cancer Institute and National Institute of Health, teaches the seminar Science and Society
- Ted Widmer — American historian, writer, and speechwriter who has taught seminars on Walt Whitman, democracy, and The People of New York
