= The Nibroc Trilogy =

Set of three plays by Arlene Hutton

The Nibroc Trilogy (3 plays)
- Original language: English
- Written by: Arlene Hutton
- Characters: 1 male, 4 female
- Setting: 1940s Kentucky; 1950s Florida

Premiere
- Date: 1999 - 2006
- Place: United States

The Nibroc Trilogy, a set of three plays about the challenges of a young couple living in Kentucky and Florida in the 1940s and early 1950s, is the best-known work of the American playwright Arlene Hutton. The individual plays were first produced between 1999 and 2006.

Both the individual works and the trilogy as a whole have received critical acclaim, and the first part of the series, the two-character work Last Train to Nibroc, has so far received about 100 productions and is Hutton's most frequently produced play.

== Plot summaries ==
=== Last Train to Nibroc ===
In the first play of the trilogy, "May and Raleigh meet in 1940 on an eastbound train that carries the bodies of F. Scott Fitzgerald and Nathaniel West. Unable to enlist because of a medical condition, he wants to be a writer; she wants to be a missionary and they discover they are from neighboring towns in Kentucky. In this boy-meets-girl romance... two young people navigate through the tough times of a country at war discovering what they have to give up to get what they really want."

=== See Rock City ===
In the second play of the trilogy, "when WW II victory overseas brings unexpected consequences at home, a young Kentucky couple is forced to face hidden truths and find uncommon solutions to the challenges of a new post-war America."

=== Gulf View Drive ===
In the final play of the trilogy, "ten years into their marriage, May and Raleigh live in an island community off the gulf coast of Florida. Their dream house shrinks as relatives descend, further testing the couple's love in this romantic, humorous, and insightful glimpse of life in the 1950s."

== Background ==
Last Train to Nibroc, the first play of the trilogy, was inspired by Hutton's learning, from a book about S.J. Perelman, that the legendary writers F. Scott Fitzgerald and Nathaniel West, Perelman's brother-in-law, not only died within a day of one another in 1940, but that their corpses may very well have been shipped back for burial to the East Coast on the same train. Said Hutton, "I didn't want to write about bodies, so I put a young man and woman on the train... My parents would have been falling in love about that time." Though she states that the couple in the trilogy – May and Raleigh – are not based on her parents, she freely drew upon family lore for the setting and many minor incidents in the play. The title of the play, for instance, refers to Corbin, Kentucky, located in her parents' state of origin, where the real-life annual Nibroc Festival is held ("Nibroc" is "Corbin" spelled backwards).

While writing it, Hutton thought of the work as "a really old-fashioned play that nobody would want to see." However, Last Train to Nibroc turned out to be the playwright's most frequently produced play, having received about 100 productions. Hutton had originally intended to write only the first work, but later continued the story of the protagonists through the second and third parts of the trilogy. Eventually, the trilogy had a ten-year history of development and regional performance.

== Critical reception ==
Washington Post critic, Celia Wren, called Last Train to Nibroc "a sneakily compelling love story" and "intimate, wise and surprising, with a delightful penultimate narrative twist," stressing that during the course of the narrative both characters change believably. In The New York Times, D.J.R. Bruckner wrote: "'Last Train' is not about events; it is about character. And when you leave this performance after 90 minutes of seeing these people reveal depths of feelings they are trying to hide, you might think you could easily enjoy another few hours of this." Chris Jones of The Chicago Tribune awarded Last Train to Nibroc four stars, calling it "the surprise don’t-miss of summer." Jones also wrote, "What makes the writing in this play so seductive is the way that Hutton forges such strong but needy and yet inquisitive characters, and how she makes them emblematic of the sweeping change that beset America in the 1940s. In reaching for those bigger social observations, she never compromises their individuality nor their humanity… 'Last Train to Nibroc' most closely recalls the work of Horton Foote, although Hutton is very much her own writer." David C. Nichols of the Los Angeles Times called the play "a graceful wartime romance" and observed that "Had Arlene Hutton been around during Broadway's golden age, her finely wrought plays might rank with those of William Inge or Horton Foote. Among postmodern dramatists, Hutton… stands apart, relying on traditional techniques in an era where such values grow ever rarer… 'Nibroc' takes its achingly lovely journey straight to the heart."

In a review of See Rock City, Eric ReeL (sic), the critic of Society Eight o Five, called it “a play worth seeing more than once” and “the ‘don’t miss’ sequel” to the first play. Philip Brandes of The Los Angeles Times wrote, “With so many dramas these days built around bad behavior — the worse the better, it seems — it's a downright anomaly to come across a genuinely compelling story about ordinary people trying to do their best.” Charles Donelan of the Santa Barbara Independent wrote "there’s something extraordinary happening at the Rubicon with See Rock City that makes it utterly irresistible. Hutton’s writing has wings..." He added that the play was an "unusually well-crafted and moving drama."

In his review of Gulf View Drive, directed by Katherine Farmer, which won an Ovation Award for Best Production at the Rubicon Theatre, Brandes wrote that the third play "fittingly conclude[s] a three-year project" to present the entire trilogy, and that the third play "thoroughly satisfies on its own merits." He noted that adding the character of the hero’s sister, Treva, "brings significantly more complexity to this chapter, with seemingly unrelated plot threads that take their time converging in an artfully constructed denouement." Marilyn Stasio of Variety, however, wrote that the play covers so much socio-historical ground that it "tends to sag from the weight of its responsibilities. But the spine of the central relationship holds it up."

The trilogy has been compared to the plays of Pulitzer Prize winner William Inge, as well as to the work of film director Frank Capra and even that of Jane Austen. Eric ReeL observes that "Hutton’s trilogy… builds an extended narrative with a psychological and emotional journey that offers a whole considerably more satisfying than the sum of its parts… it is not only a work that captures a period in our history, and the timeless story of a young couple living through that history, but she has captured the essence of an entire era in the history of American theatre." Stasio believes that the three plays will attract audiences looking for "'event theater' that eschews flashy effects, demanding instead a long-term commitment to deserving characters caught up in trying circumstances." Gina Bellafante in The New York Times calls the three parts of the work "exquisitely quiet, gently reaching plays" that "ought to be seen by anyone who doubts the capacity of front porch drama to tell a meaningful story beyond its own perimeters."
