= Centre Stage (theater) =

Theater in Greenville, South Carolina

Coordinates: 34°50′58″N 82°24′8″W

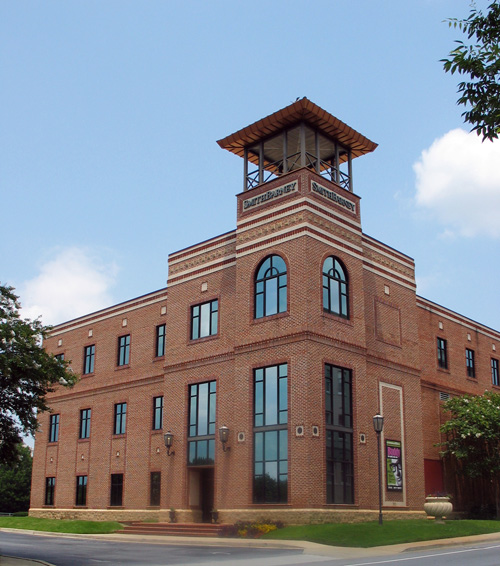
The Citi-Smith-Barney building where Centre Stage has been located since 1997.

Centre Stage is a year-round, 285-seat theater in downtown Greenville, South Carolina. The theater maintains a full-time staff of seven and produces between six and eight mainstage productions each year, in addition to a wide variety of other entertainment and nightlife activities. Actors, directors and other theater artists are hired both locally and regionally on an as-needed basis. Centre Stage is a constituent member of Theatre Communications Group (TCG) and a member of the professional division of the Southeastern Theatre Conference (SETC).

== Collaborations ==
Through collaborations with arts organizations elsewhere in the city (Greenville Symphony Orchestra, Metropolitan Arts Council, etc.), Centre Stage has expanded its range of entertainment and nightlife offerings to include art exhibitions, chamber concerts, independent film screenings and lectures on a wide variety of topics. Faculty and students from area colleges and universities (North Greenville University, Clemson University, Furman University) regularly direct and staff Centre Stage productions. Greenville Technical College (GTC) theater classes are taught at Centre Stage by GTC professor of theater Dr. Brian Haimbach, who also is chairman of the Centre Stage New Play Festival. CSSC is also host to Greenville Light Opera Works. GLOW is Greenville's professional opera, operetta and musical theatre company and produces a summer festival season of comic opera, operetta and musical theatre.

== History ==
Founded in 1983 by Douglas P. McCoy, Centre Stage was formed with the intent of becoming a professional theater. The theater's first performance space was inside the Greenville County Museum of Art and its first full production was presented in the St. Mary's Church gymnatorium. For the next four years, Centre Stage performed in the Greenville School District's Fine Arts Center. For the next ten years Centre Stage leased a building on the corner of Washington and Academy Streets and produced all of its plays there.

In April 1996, Centre Stage was approved as an Associate Member of Theatre Communications Group (TCG) and remains so to this day. TCG membership entitles Centre Stage to all of the rights and privileges of a professional theatre. In April, 1998, Centre Stage was designated as a Constituent Member of TCG.

In December 1996, ground was broken for the theater's current location at 501 River Street where it occupies 10,000 square feet (930 m^{2}) of the 30,000-square-foot (2,800 m^{2}) Citi-Smith Barney Building. Centre Stage took occupancy of this venue on October 1, 1997, and staged its first performance there on October 2, 1997.

== New Play Festival ==
The Centre Stage New Play Festival (NPF) receives hundreds of scripts throughout the year submitted by playwrights from around the country and abroad. Four finalists are chosen to be presented in readers’ theater format during each year’s festival. Talkback sessions for the four festival finalists take place immediately following the readings, making the festival an opportunity for playgoers to participate in the creative process that culminates in a full production of the play chosen as festival winner. Previous NPF winners include The Edith Whartons by Erwin Palley (winner 2005 NPF, produced 2006), Guided Tour by Peter Snoad (winner 2006 NPF, produced 2007) and The Uncurled Hand by Stephen Kilduff (winner 2007 NPF, produced 2008), "The Legacy" by Adam Siegel (winner 2008 NPF, produced 2009), "Coal Creek" by Walter Thinnes (winner 2009 NPF, produced 2010). Each year's festival features a keynote playwright of national stature, such as Lee Blessing and Arlene Hutton.
