= Ann Kirschner =

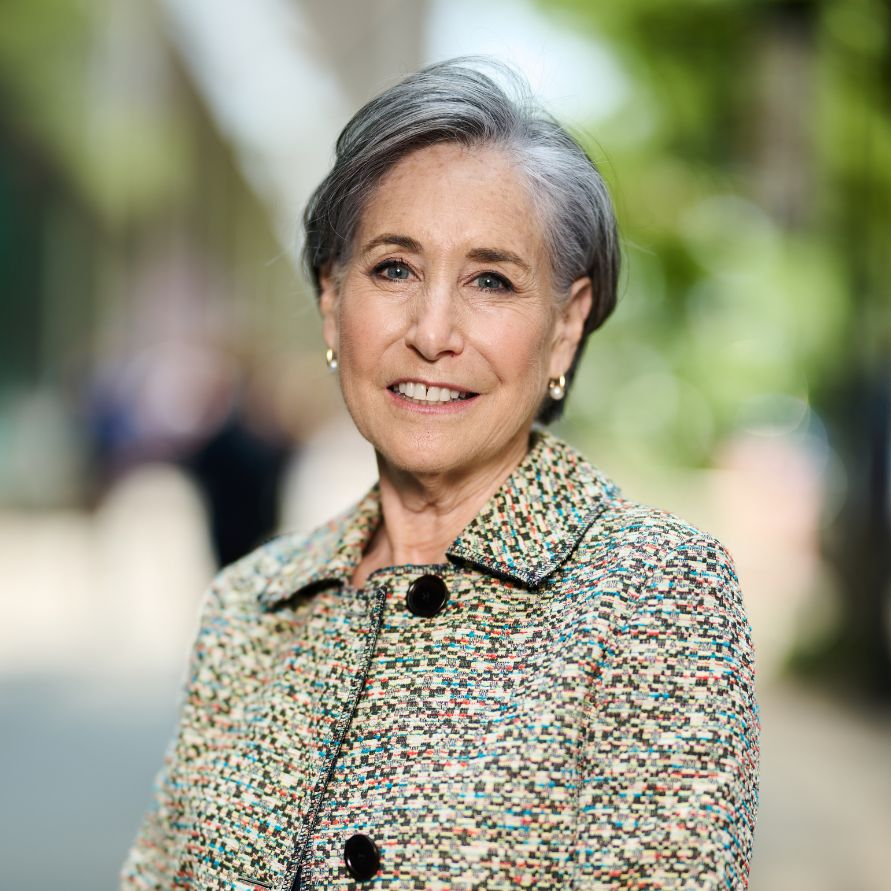

Former Interim President of Hunter College
- In office July 2023 – August 12th 2024
- Preceded by: Jennifer Raab
- Succeeded by: Nancy Cantor

2nd Dean of the Macaulay Honors College
- In office 2006–2016
- Preceded by: Dr. Laura S. Schor
- Succeeded by: Dara Byrne

Personal details
- Spouse: Harold Weinberg
- Education: University of Buffalo (BA); University of Virginia (MA); Princeton University (PHD)

Ann Kirschner is an American entrepreneur, academic, and author of the books Sala's Gift: My Mother's Holocaust Story and Lady at the OK Corral: The True Story of Josephine Marcus Earp. She previously served as the interim president of Hunter College. As a tech entrepreneur in the 1990s and 2000s, Kirschner launched the National Football League's website, the first online livestream of the Super Bowl, and co-founded Columbia University's interactive knowledge network Fathom.com. She is Dean Emerita of Macaulay Honors College of the City University of New York, a university professor at the CUNY Graduate Center, a faculty fellow of the Futures Initiative, and interim president of Hunter College.

== Education and early career ==
Kirschner was born in New York City to Sala Kirschner, a Holocaust survivor from Poland, and Sidney Kirschner, an American GI who brought her home as a war bride. Kirschner attended public school in New York City, then earned a bachelor of arts degree from the University at Buffalo and a master's degree from the University of Virginia. She received her doctorate in English literature from Princeton University, where she was a Whiting Fellow in the Humanities.

Kirschner started out as a lecturer on Victorian literature at Princeton University and working as a freelance writer for CBS, The New York Times, and Chronicle of Higher Education. She assisted the director of English programs at Modern Language Association, and Lola Szladits, the director of the Berg Collection at the New York Public Library. Kirschner has conducted research on doctorates in business, funded by grants from Texas Committee for the Humanities, and the Littauer Foundation to study slave labor camps. Kirschner was scholar-in-residence at Rollins College and James Madison University.

== Entrepreneurship ==
Her start-ups include Request Teletext, the first full-channel cable teletext service; Primetime 24 - the first home satellite broadcast network; NFL Sunday Ticket and NFL.com - the first sports league on satellite television and the Internet; and Fathom.com, one of the first offerings of online learning in higher education to be affiliated with universities, libraries, museums, and research institutions. Fathom's consortium includes Columbia University, London School of Economics, New York Public Library, British Library, British Museum, Victoria and Albert Museum, Cambridge University Press, the Science Museum of the University of Chicago, University of Michigan, Woods Hole Oceanographic Institution, and American Film Institute. She introduced new media to the National Football League (NFL) using emerging technologies, such as interactive television and the Internet, and founded NFL.com, Superbowl.com and Team NFL on America Online. Kirschner was responsible for livestreaming Super Bowl XXX, the first Super Bowl ever broadcast on the web.

== Academia ==
From 2006-2016, Kirschner served as Dean of Macaulay Honors College, the selective honors college for students at the City University of New York. As Dean, Kirschner opened the William Macaulay Honors College Center on 67th Street in Manhattan, which was the first dedicated space for CUNY students in the honors college. After retiring as dean, Kirschner served as Senior Advisor to the Chancellor and University Professor developing courses in higher education and workforce development at the CUNY Graduate Center.

Kirschner co-founded Women In Technology and Entrepreneurship in New York (WiTNY), a collaboration between CUNY and Cornell Tech to increase participation of women in computer science. WiTNY later became the founding chapter of Break Through Tech, where Kirschner serves on the advisory board.

In 2023, Kirschner was appointed interim president of Hunter College.

== Advisor and Board Director ==
She is a current or former board member of Movado Group (MOV), Strategic Cyber Ventures, Apollo Group, Topps, onhealth.com, Public Agenda, Jewish Women's Archive, MOUSE, Paul and Daisy Soros Foundation, Footsteps, World Quant University, New York Media Association, Theatreworks USA, Footsteps, the Princeton University English Department Advisory Council, and the Leadership Council of the Princeton University Graduate School.

== Professional recognition ==
Kirschner received the Above and Beyond Award (2014) from City and State Magazine, New York Award from New York Magazine (1999), and as a distinguished alumni of University at Buffalo and Princeton University. In 2023, City & State New York named her to the Manhattan Power 100 list of the borough's most influential political players.

== Publications ==
=== Books ===
Kirschner is the author of Sala's Gift: My Mother's Holocaust Story, the story of her mother's wartime rescue of hundreds of letters sent to her during the five years she spent in Nazi slave Labor camps. The letters include correspondence between Kirschner's mother and Ala Gertner, who was hanged for her role the sonderkommando revolt at Auschwitz. The book has also been published in German as Salas Geheiminis, in Polish, as Listy z Pudełka, in Italian, as Il Dono di Sala, in French, as Le Secret de ma mère, in Czech as Salin Dar, and Chinese (Mandarin). The book was adapted to a play entitled Letters to Sala by Arlene Hutton, which had its New York premiere on October 2, 2015 by and is distributed by Dramatists Play Service.

Her second book, Lady at the OK Corral: the True Story of Josephine Marcus Earp was published by HarperCollins in March 2013. It is a biography of Josephine Marcus Earp, Wyatt Earp's common law wife of nearly 50-years. According to the author, Marcus sparked the world's most famous gunfight, buried her husband in a Jewish cemetery after he died in 1929, and subsequently shaped the legend of Wyatt Earp and the Wild West. In 2013, Kirschner's book was selected as an Editor's Choice by The New York Times Sunday Book Review and Kirschner was honored as best new Western author by True West Magazine.

=== Selected publications ===
- Are Universities On the Wrong Side of History? Forbes
- Perfume Before Zoom, I Presume, Forward
- Dad, Did Trump Lose Your Vote? Newsweek
- Education is Not Preparing Students for a Fast-Changing World: Boston Globe
- Innovations in Higher Education, HAH! The Chronicle of Higher Education:
- The Chronicle of Higher Education: Adventures in the Land of Wikipedia
- The Chronicle of Higher Education: Reading Dickens Four Ways
- The Chronicle of Higher Education: My iPad Day
- The Baltimore Sun: Study Abroad to Get Ahead in the U.S. (Commentary)
