= Tehilla-Evelina de Rothschild Secondary School =

Public school in Jerusalem

Evelina de Rothschild Secondary School
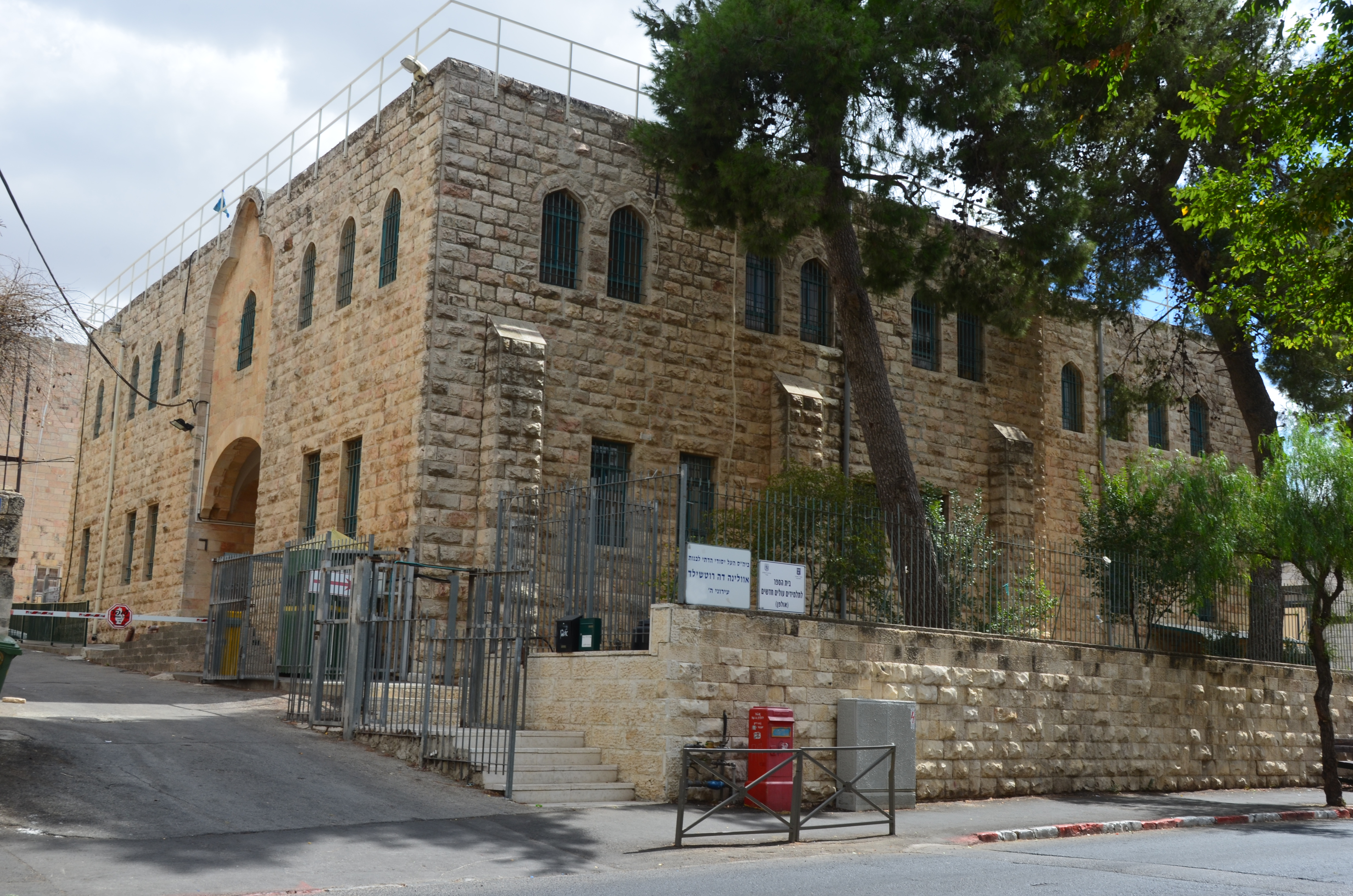

Location
- Menahem Ussishkin St 38, Jerusalem; Israel
- Coordinates: 31.7782°N 35.2125°E

Information
- Former name: Evelina de Rothschild School
- Type: Public secondary school
- Religious affiliation: Modern Orthodox Judaism
- Established: 1854; 172 years ago
- Founder: Dr Albert Cohen
- Oversight: Jerusalem Municipality
- Principal: Hagit Barnea
- Gender: Girls

The Evelina de Rothschild Secondary School is a public Jewish religious secondary school for girls, located originally in the Old City of Jerusalem, but nowadays on Ussishkin Street. Founded in 1854 as the Evelina de Rothschild School, it was the first Jewish school for girls in Israel, and at the time had a Jewish Orthodox philosophy.

In 2007 it was reported that Orthodox Jewish girls schools, including the Evelina de Rothschild School, were facing falling enrolments due the demand for liberal Orthodox Jewish schools for girls. In 2011, the school merged with Tehilla Religious Girls' School, and the Jerusalem Municipality took a financial interest.

== History ==
The school was founded in 1854 in the Old City of Jerusalem by Dr Albert Cohen. The students learned domestic tasks such as sewing and knitting. Baron Lionel de Rothschild became the school's patron in 1867, naming it after his daughter Evelina who had died the previous year. The Anglo-Jewish Association took control of the school in 1962, out of a desire to influence the developing cultural character of Israel, although the baron continued to make a donation of £800 to the school every year.

The school served a diverse population; there were both Ashkenazi and Sephardi students, as well as students who were Moroccan, Karaite, and Armenian Christian. The school was overseen by the nearby Rothschild Hospital, in the Old City of Jerusalem. In 1886, Dr. Yitzchak Schwartz, who oversaw the hospital, submitted the following report regarding the school:

150 girls – 6 to 14 years of age – attended the school. 100 of them received a daily meal of soup, vegetables, and bread, and twice weekly of meat. One teacher gave lessons in Hebrew reading and writing, likewise two mistresses gave lessons in French reading and writing as well as math, also during the summer term there were some lessons in geography and natural history and three mistresses taught needlework, including dressmaking and sewing.

— Dr. Yitzchak Schwartz to Leopold Rothschild

== Administration ==
When, in 1888, the Rothschild Hospital moved into a larger building outside of the Old City, the Rothschilds appointed Fortunée Behar as the school's first headmistress. When Behar resigned in 1899, Annie Landau became the new headmistress of the school. She was awarded an MBE on the occasion of the King's birthday by Sir Herbert Samuel, British High Commissioner in 1924. Landau served as the headmistress from 1899 to 1945. When she died in 1945, vice principal Ethel Levy took over the position, leading the school through the tumultuous establishment of the State of Israel. Levy retired in 1960. Dr. Beverly Gribetz was awarded a Sylvan Adams Nefesh B’Nefesh Bonei Zion Prize in 2019 for her work as principal of the Evelina de Rothschild-Tehilla Secondary School.

Ordinal	Officeholder	Title	Term start	Term end	Time in office	Notes
1	Fortunée Behar	Headmistress	1888	1899	10–11 years	
2	Annie Landau MBE	Headmistress	1900	1945	44–45 years	
3	Ethel Levy	Headmistress	1945	1960	14–15 years	
−						
4	Beverly Gribetz	Principal	2007	2020	12–13 years	
5	Hagit Barnea	Principal	2020	2021	1-2 years	
6	Shuli Rosenak Isaacs	Principal	2021	present		
