= Suez Economic and Trade Cooperation Zone =

Industrial estate near Suez, Egypt

The Suez Economic and Trade Cooperation Zone (SETC) is an industrial estate near the city of Suez, Egypt, established by a joint partnership between the governments of the People's Republic of China and the Arab Republic of Egypt, for the purposes of inviting Chinese companies to set up industries, as part of the Belt and Road project.

It was built by the Tianjin Economic-Technological Development Area (TEDA). The SETC zone was created in 2008 and extended in 2016 in a ceremony attended by CCP general secretary Xi Jinping on a state visit to Egypt.

The zone hosts several enterprises and manufacturing companies, including Jushi, which produces fiberglass in Egypt primarily for export The EU introduced significant tariffs on fiberglass imports from Egypt as a result, alleging they were dumping the fiberglass.
