= Arlene Hutton =

American playwright

Arlene Hutton (Note: "Arlene Hutton" is the pen name of actor-director Beth Lincks.) is an American playwright, theatre artist and teacher. She is best known for a trio of plays, set during and after the Second World War, known as The Nibroc Trilogy. The initial play of that trilogy, Last Train to Nibroc, was the first play to transfer from FringeNYC to Off-Broadway (the second to do so was the hit musical Urinetown). Other works for which she is known include a one-act dramatic work about the aftermath of a sexual assault, I Dream Before I Take the Stand; a one-act musical drama set among the members of a Shaker community in the 19th century, As It Is in Heaven; and a Holocaust-themed work, Letters to Sala, based on actual documents. She has also created plays for young audiences.

Her work has won many awards. From The Nibroc Trilogy, Last Train to Nibroc received a 2000 New York Drama League Best Play nomination, See Rock City won the In the Spirit of America Award, and Gulf View Drive received L.A. Weekly and Ovation Award nominations, as well as the 2018 Ovation Award for Best Production at the Rubicon Theatre. She is a three-time winner of the Samuel French Short Play Festival, and eight-time finalist for the Heideman Award at Actors Theatre of Louisville.

Hutton has received critical acclaim for her plays, which have been compared to the works of Horton Foote, William Inge, Jane Austen and Lanford Wilson, among others. Of her, one journalist wrote, "In an era when playwrights are a vanishing species and Disney dominates Broadway, [Hutton] has fashioned a remarkable place for herself."

== Early life, education and playwriting career ==
Born in Louisiana, Hutton was raised in Sarasota, Florida. Her parents were both college professors with roots in Eastern Kentucky, which is partly the setting of her best-known and most-acclaimed work, The Nibroc Trilogy (Last Train to Nibroc, See Rock City and Gulf View Drive), though her work is not directly autobiographical. Hutton majored in theatre arts at Rollins College, a private liberal arts college in Winter Park, Florida. Her experience at Rollins included acting, directing, and costuming. After graduating from Rollins, she went to Asolo Conservatory at Florida State University (FSU), where she received an MFA in theatre.

In the 1990s, Hutton wrote her first play, I Dream Before I Take the Stand. She has several times described herself as the "accidental playwright," because, according to her, she was only moved to write plays to create better roles for herself than those of the plays in which she'd been appearing. In 1995, she took several one-act plays, including I Dream Before I Take the Stand, to the Edinburgh Fringe in Edinburgh, Scotland to be staged. At the festival, her plays were favorably reviewed. When Last Train to Nibroc premiered in New York, it attracted so much attention that it transferred to an off-Broadway venue. Eventually, she gave up acting to concentrate completely on playwriting. She credits Tennessee Williams and Lanford Wilson as among her major inspirations.

Hutton's artist's residencies have included Access Theatre, the Australian National Playwrights Conference, the New Harmony Project, Blue Mountain Center, Greenville Centre Stage's New Play Festival, the MacDowell Colony, Yaddo and Winterthur. Hutton is an alumna of New Dramatists and a member of Ensemble Studio Theatre, the National Theatre Conference and The Dramatists Guild.

== Plays ==
=== The Nibroc Trilogy ===
==== Background ====
Last Train to Nibroc, the first part of Hutton's best-known work, The Nibroc Trilogy, was inspired by her learning, from a book about S.J. Perelman, that the legendary writers F. Scott Fitzgerald and Nathaniel West, Perelman's brother-in-law, had not only died within a day of one another in 1940, but that their corpses may very well have been shipped back for burial to the East Coast on the same train. The title of the play refers to Corbin, Kentucky – her parents' state of origin – where the real-life annual Nibroc Festival is held ("Nibroc" is Corbin spelled backwards). Despite Hutton's expectation while writing it that the play would not be popular, Last Train to Nibroc turned out to be the playwright's most frequently produced play, having received about 100 productions to date.

==== Critical reception of the individual plays and the trilogy ====
The New York Times critic, D.J.R. Bruckner wrote: "'Last Train' is not about events; it is about character. And when you leave this performance after 90 minutes of seeing these people reveal depths of feelings they are trying to hide, you might think you could easily enjoy another few hours of this." Chris Jones of Chicago Tribune awarded Last Train to Nibroc four stars, writing that it "most closely recalls the work of Horton Foote, although Hutton is very much her own writer." David C. Nichols of the Los Angeles Times observed that "Had Arlene Hutton been around during Broadway's golden age, her finely wrought plays might rank with those of William Inge or Horton Foote."

In a review of See Rock City, Philip Brandes of the Los Angeles Times wrote "With so many dramas these days built around bad behavior — the worse the better, it seems — it's a downright anomaly to come across a genuinely compelling story about ordinary people trying to do their best."

In his review of Gulf View Drive, directed by Katherine Farmer, which won an Ovation Award for Best Production at the Rubicon Theatre, Brandes wrote that the third play "thoroughly satisfies on its own merits." However, Marilyn Stasio of Variety wrote that the play covers so much socio-historical ground that it "tends to sag from the weight of its responsibilities. But the spine of the central relationship holds it up."

Eric ReeL (sic) observes that "Hutton's trilogy... is not only a work that captures a period in our history, and the timeless story of a young couple living through that history, but she has captured the essence of an entire era in the history of American theatre." Stasio believes that the three plays will attract audiences looking for "'event theater' that eschews flashy effects, demanding instead a long-term commitment to deserving characters caught up in trying circumstances." Gina Bellafante in The New York Times calls the three parts of the work "exquisitely quiet, gently reaching plays" that "ought to be seen by anyone who doubts the capacity of front porch drama to tell a meaningful story beyond its own perimeters."

=== I Dream Before I Take the Stand ===
==== Background ====
Hutton's first play, I Dream Before I Take the Stand, about a woman facing a hostile interrogator concerning a sexual assault incident in which she was the victim, was first performed, as noted above, at the Edinburgh Fringe Festival in 1995. The work has since received many professional productions, as well as amateur stagings, and has been anthologized in the collection The Best American Short Plays 1998-1999.

==== Reception ====
The List (Edinburgh, Scotland) called I Dream Before I Take the Stand "a feminist classic." The New Jersey Independent called it "a riveting piece of theatre. The writing is pithy and fierce." The critic for New York Newsday wrote that the play had "David Mamet overtones, but far more sympathy for the female victim enduring a nightmare quizzing than Mamet ever musters."

Since 2017, Hutton's play has received particular attention with the rise of the #MeToo movement protesting sexual harassment and sexual assault. In April 2018, a group of Pittsfield High School students chose the play because they considered it particularly timely. The production inspired an editorial in The Berkshire Eagle that considered the issue of sexual assault as it relates to young people.

=== As It Is in Heaven ===
==== Background ====
As It Is in Heaven, a play with an all-female cast, was first performed at the Edinburgh Fringe Festival in 2001. A production was scheduled to open at off-Broadway's 78th Street Theatre Lab in New York City on September 13 of that year. Two days prior, the September 11 attacks occurred, and on that night, the cast members responded by rehearsing the Shaker hymns performed in the play. The production later opened as planned. In 2008, the play was performed in Shakertown, in Pleasant Hill, Kentucky, the place that had first inspired it, and it was revived in New York in 2011.

==== Critical reception ====
Calling Hutton "one of the most richly humane voices in contemporary theater," F. Kathleen Foley of The Los Angeles Times described As It Is in Heaven as "amusing, intellectually stimulating and moving – a beautifully crafted piece that will endure." Reviewing the original New York production, Brooke Pierce of TheaterMania noted that the "90-minute, bare bones production... is moved along smoothly... to its satisfying and inspiring conclusion." The critic of The Village Voice, Alexis Soloski, noted that "the scenes of the women working and living together are wonderful for their very Shaker-like qualities: simplicity, unpretentiousness, attention to detail," although Soloski claims that the playwright "weaves in a dramatic arc that never seems as finely worked as the rest of the play." Anita Gates in The New York Times, reviewing the New York revival, described As It Is in Heaven as a "modest, strangely moving one-act," which "is also an unexpected patchwork of high and low cultural influences," including The Age of Innocence, The Crucible and even The Book of Mormon.

=== Letters to Sala ===
==== Background ====
Letters to Sala was derived from letters owned by Sala Garncarz Kirschner, a Polish Jewish woman who, beginning at age 16, spent five years in Nazi labor camps and kept letters and other messages she received in the camps carefully hidden from the Nazis. Her daughter, writer Ann Kirschner, was moved to write a book about the letters, Sala's Gift: My Mother's Holocaust Story. The original short play was presented at the New York Public Library to accompany an exhibition of Sala's letters. Kirschner, theatre director Lawrence Sacharow and Hutton then began collaborating on a full-length version of the play, a project that survived Sacharow's death from leukemia. The full play was performed at Rollins, Hutton's alma mater, in 2011, under the direction of Hutton's longtime collaborator Eric Nightengale, with Sala and her husband, Sidney, present in the audience.

==== Critical reception ====
For a 2007 workshop of the play in Tucson, Arizona, a critic wrote, "I found myself just listening to the letters being read by the various actors and forgetting they actually were playing roles in a play. It was the richness of the written word that intrigued me." The critic for the Orlando Sentinel, reviewing the Rollins College production, noted that "in places the play seems like a poem... a moving, timeless, beautiful poem," though he expressed reservations about "a slight imbalance in the dual stories, with too much emphasis on the modern family's quarrel." In a review of the Barrow Group performance of the play, critic R. Jones wrote that the play was written "with loving grace" and noted that "there was always a spark of hope in the bright young eyes of Sala... That is the beauty and the magic of Letters to Sala."

=== Other plays ===
Other plays for adults written by Hutton include:

- The Three Sisters Brontë, a drama about the Brontë sisters inspired by Anton Chekhov's classic, The Three Sisters, in which the sisters "struggle to find creative prosperity while navigating the harsh realities of male society."
- Running, a play set against the New York City Marathon. A New York Times writer praised Hutton for her "fine ear for the fits and starts of conversation" and noted that the "loose, thinking-it-through-as-we-go quality [of the play] is part of its charm."
- Vacuum, a drama about a scientist who may have found the cure for cancer. According to one critic, the play is "filled with great characters and very profound ethical undertones" and "exceeds... what you can normally expect" of FringeNYC.
- Five short plays: Studio Portrait, Houseplay, At the Tone, Friends for Life and The Price You Pay.

Hutton has also written the following plays for young audiences:

- Happy Worst Day Ever: Commissioned by Cincinnati Playhouse, the play won the Macy's 2010 New Play Prize.
- Kissed the Girls and Made Them Cry.

Working alongside other playwrights, including Craig Pospisil, Hutton co-wrote the ensemble plays:

- The Gorges Motel: which premiered at the 20th annual New York International Fringe Festival; and
- One Christmas Eve at Evergreen Mall, which premiered at the 21st annual New York International Fringe Festival.
- By The Numbers, which was commissioned by the Florida section of the Mathematical Association of America and premiered at their 50th anniversary conference at the State College of Florida, Manatee-Sarasota.

Two two-character short plays by Hutton have been produced for Internet podcast on the playingonair.org website: Last Train to Nibroc (see above), featuring Mamie Gummer and Gregg Mozgala and directed by John Rando, and Closing Costs, featuring Amy Ryan and Michael Stuhlbarg and directed by Gaye Taylor Upchurch.

== Teaching ==
Hutton has served as an adjunct professor at Fordham University, as both a Tennessee Williams Fellow and faculty member at Sewanee: The University of the South, and as a Visiting Assistant Professor of Playwriting at the College of Charleston. She currently (as of 2019) teaches playwriting at The Barrow Group School in New York.

== Awards and honors ==
In addition to the above-mentioned honors and awards, Hutton received a New Play Festival Best Play honorable mention at the Chattanooga Theatre Center for Letters to Sala, the Lippmann and Calloway Awards (as playwright) from New Dramatists, and a Francesca Primus Prize finalist designation from the American Theatre Critics Association.

The playwright has twice received The Tennessee Williams fellowship from The University of the South and the NYSCA/NYFA Artist Fellowship in 2016 from the New York Foundation for the Arts, as well as fellowships from the William Inge Center for the Arts and the South Carolina Arts Commission. She also received an EST/Sloan Commission (for the play Maria Sybilla) from Ensemble Studio Theatre.

In 2017, Hutton was commissioned by The Big Bridge Theatre Consortium (BBTC), a consortium of university theatre departments across the country, committed to developing new plays dedicated to peace and interfaith dialogue. She was the first playwright ever to be so honored.

== Publications ==
Hutton's works have been published by Theatrical Rights Worldwide, Dramatists Play Service, Samuel French, Dramatic Publishing and Playscripts.

Her plays have been frequently anthologized.
