= Ala Gertner =

German Nazi concentration camp victim

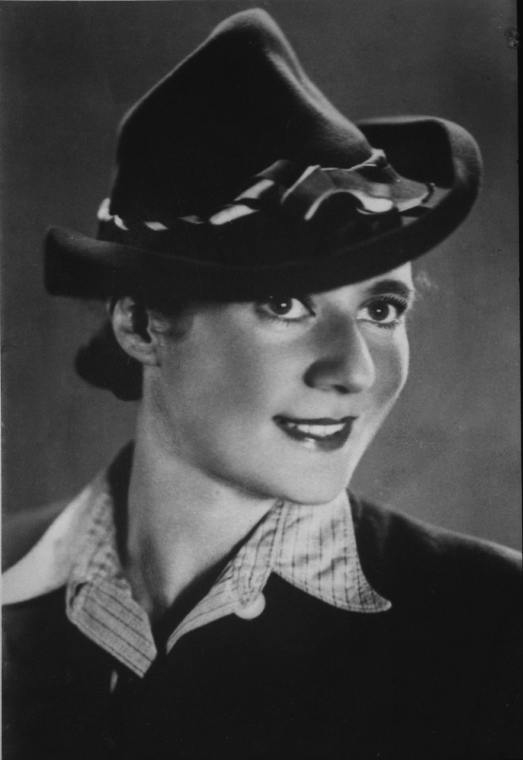
- Portrait photograph of Gertner from the photo studio in the Będzin Ghetto, circa 1943
- Born: 12 March 1912; Będzin, Congress Poland, Russian Empire
- Died: 5 January 1945 (aged 32); Auschwitz-Birkenau, German-occupied Poland
- Cause of death: Execution by hanging

Ala Gertner (12 March 1912 – 5 January 1945), referred to in other sources as Alla, Alina, Ella, and Ela Gertner, was one of four women hanged in the Auschwitz concentration camp for her role in the Sonderkommando revolt of 7 October 1944.

== Life ==
Gertner was born in Będzin, Poland, one of three children in a prosperous Jewish family. Before the German and Slovakia invasion of Poland, she attended the gymnasium in Będzin. The city was located in the industrial region of Zagłębie Dąbrowskie in south-western Poland on the border with Germany.

=== Geppersdorf labour camp ===
The German military took over Będzin on the first day of the invasion, burned the Grand Synagogue down within a week, and began massive resettlement actions. On 28 October 1940 Gertner was ordered to report to the train station in nearby Sosnowiec, where she was taken to a Nazi labor camp in Geppersdorf (now Rzedziwojowice), a construction site where hundreds of Jewish men were used as forced laborers on the Reichsautobahn section (now Berlinka) and where women worked in the kitchen and laundry. Gertner, who was fluent in German, was assigned to the camp office, where she met prisoner Bernhard Holtz whom she would marry in the Będzin Ghetto in the following year.

Geppersdorf was part of Organisation Schmelt, a network of 177 labor camps under the administration of Albrecht Schmelt, a World War I veteran who joined the Nazis in 1930 and rose quickly to the post of SS Oberführer. Because of his familiarity with the local political and social conditions in the annexed region of western Poland, Schmelt was hand-picked by SS head Heinrich Himmler to be "Special Representative of the Reichsführer SS for the Employment of Foreign Labor in Upper Silesia." After his official appointment in October 1940, Schmelt set up headquarters in Sosnowiec and created a labor camp system that would become known as Organisation Schmelt.

Schmelt built a highly lucrative slave trade. Over 50,000 Jews from western Poland were forced to work for German businesses, primarily in construction, munitions, and textile manufacturing. The businesses paid Schmelt, who shared a fraction of the money with Moses Merin, the Jewish governor of the region. Almost none of it went to the Jewish laborers. Conditions varied, but were much better than in the large concentration camps: for example, mail and packages could be received in some of the Schmelt camps until 1943, when the Schmelt labor camps became part of Auschwitz and Gross-Rosen. (Oskar Schindler's camp was originally under Organization Schmelt.)

In 1941, Gertner was allowed to return home. She was employed in various local workshops and offices run by Moses Merin. She and Bernhard Holtz were married in the Sosnowiec Ghetto of Środula on 22 May 1943. They lived in the Będzin Ghetto neighbourhood of Kamionka until sometime after 16 July 1943 (the date of Gertner's last known letter) and were probably deported to Auschwitz with the remaining Jews of Sosnowiec and Będzin in early August 1943.

=== At Auschwitz ===
At Auschwitz, Gertner worked in the warehouses at first, sorting the possessions of Jews who had been gassed. She became friendly with Roza Robota, who was active in the underground resistance. Gertner was then assigned to the office of the munitions factory, where she and Roza became part of a conspiracy to smuggle gunpowder to the Sonderkommando, who were building bombs and planning an escape. Gertner recruited other women to join the conspiracy, and passed the stolen gunpowder to Roza.

On 7 October 1944 the Sonderkommando blew up Crematorium IV, but the revolt was quickly quelled by the armed SS guards. A lengthy investigation led the Nazis back to Gertner and Roza, and then to Estusia Wajcblum and Regina Safirsztajn, who were also implicated in the conspiracy. They were interrogated and tortured for weeks. On 5 January 1945 the four women were publicly hanged in Auschwitz. Other sources give 6 January as the date of the execution. This was the last public hanging at Auschwitz: two weeks later, the camp was evacuated; one week after the evacuation, the Red Army arrived at the site.

== Legacy ==
Gertner left no known survivors or family, but her 28 letters to a camp friend, Sala Kirschner (née Garncarz), also from the Sosnowiec Ghetto, are among the 350 wartime letters that are in the permanent Sala Garncarz Kirschner Collection of the Dorot Jewish Division of the New York Public Library. The heroism of the four women was recognized in 1991 with the dedication of a memorial at Yad Vashem.

This is the text of Gertner's last known letter:

Kamionka
15 July 1943
Dearest Sarenka,

Suddenly I’m here at the post office. The mail is going out today and how could I not write to my Sarenka? Just now, my husband, little Bernhard was here. He looks good and feels well. I’m curious about how you are, how your health is. We are well and plan to go to the camp. Today is a gorgeous day, we are in the best of spirits and have great hopes for the future…Don’t worry, girl, it’ll be fine. Be brave, stay well. Warm regards from my entire family and our Bernhard.

Kisses, your little Ala

== Bibliography ==
- Gurewitsch, Brana. Mothers, Sisters, Resisters: Oral Histories of Women Who Survived the Holocaust, Tuscaloosa, AL: The University of Alabama Press, 1998. ISBN 0-8173-0931-4
- Heilman, Anna, Sheldon Schwartz (ed.). Never Far Away: The Auschwitz Chronicles of Anna Heilman, Calgary, AB: University of Calgary Press, 2001. ISBN 1-55238-040-8
- Kirschner, Ann, Deborah Dwork, Robert Jan Van Pelt, Jill Vexler. Letters to Sala: A Young Woman's Life in Nazi Labor Camps, The New York Public Library, 2006. ISBN 0-87104-457-9
- Kirschner, Ann. Sala's Gift: My Mother's Holocaust Story, New York: Free Press, 2006. ISBN 0-7432-8938-2
- Lore, Shelley. The Union Kommando in Auschwitz: The Auschwitz Munition Factory Through the Eyes of Its Former Slave Laborers, Lanham, MD: University Press of America, 1996. ISBN 0-7618-0194-4
- Sternberg-Newman, Judith. In the Hell of Auschwitz: The Wartime Memoirs of Judith Sternberg Newman, New York: Exposition Press, 1963. OCLC 1426388
