= Roza Robota =

Polish resistance member

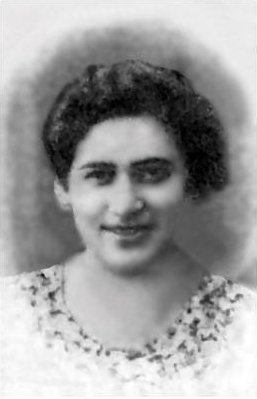
- Photograph from Robota's high school years, courtesy of Rosa Robota Foundation.
- Born: 1921; Ciechanów, Poland
- Died: 5 January 1945 (aged 23–24); Auschwitz concentration camp
- Cause of death: Execution by hanging
- Known for: Holocaust resistance

Roza Robota (1921 – 5 January 1945) or Róża Robota in Polish, referred to in other sources as Rojza, Rózia or Rosa, was the leader of a group of four women Holocaust resistors hanged in the Auschwitz concentration camp for their role in the Sonderkommando prisoner revolt of 7 October 1944.

== Biography ==
Born in 1921 in Ciechanów, Poland, to a middle-class family, Róża had one brother and one sister. She was a member of Hashomer Hatzair Zionist-socialist youth movement, and joined that movement's underground, upon the 1939 Nazi German invasion of Poland. Róża often used her Hebrew name, Shoshanah. In the home of Izajasz (Isaiah) Robota at Żydowska 4 Street in Ciechanów was the Perec Library, the most active Jewish cultural society in the city, organizing discussions about the Polish, Jewish and world literature, as well as theatre performances, lectures, and dances.

=== Auschwitz ===
Róża was transported to Auschwitz concentration camp in a Holocaust train during the liquidation of the Ciechanów Ghetto in 1942. She survived the "selection" and was assigned to Auschwitz-II Birkenau labor commando for women, but her parents were sent to the gas showers. No one else from her family in Europe is known to have survived.

In Birkenau, Róża became involved in the underground dissemination of news among the prisoners. She worked in the clothing depot at the Birkenau Effektenlager adjacent to Crematorium III of Birkenau, where the bodies of gas chamber victims were burned. She had been recruited by men of the underground whom she knew from her hometown, to smuggle "Schwarzpulver" (Black powder, gunpowder; or perhaps dynamite according to other, possibly less reliable sources) collected by daring young women who were forced to work in the Krupp "Weichsel" munitions factory. The women hid the powder in their mess tins or in the knots of their headscarves. Robota then transferred the Schwarzpulver to a Sonderkommando man named Wróbel, who was also active in the resistance. This Schwarzpulver was used to manufacture primitive grenades to help blow up the crematorium during the Sonderkommando revolt.

In her work, Róża was assisted by Hadassa Zlotnicka and her male counterpart, Godel Silber, both also from Ciechanów, whom Robota apparently enlisted in the resistance. Together with several other women and girls (estimated at 8–16 in total) who worked in the Nazi "Pulverraum" factory, they were able to obtain, hide, and turn over to Róża no more than one to three teaspoons of the Schwarzpulver compound per day, and not every day. She and other women, some unknowingly, hid the explosive material until Robota was able to smuggle it to the men of the Jewish underground. These men of the Sonderkommando blew up Crematorium IV on 7 October 1944.

Robota and three other women – Ala Gertner, Ester Wajcblum, and Regina Safirsztajn – were arrested by the Gestapo and severely tortured in the infamous Bloc 11 but they refused to reveal the names of others who participated in the smuggling operation. They were hanged on 5 January 1945 – two women at the morning roll-call assembly, two others in the evening. Robota was 23 years old. According to some eyewitness accounts, she and her comrades shouted "Nekamah" ("Vengeance!") to the assembled inmates before they died. Other witnesses state they shouted, "Chazak V'amatz" – "Be strong and have courage", the Biblical phrase that God uses to encourage Joshua after the death of Moses. This is also the motto of Hashomer Hatzair, the youth organization to which she belonged.

The Sonderkommando Revolt caused some 70 fatalities among the SS and kapos and blew the roof off one crematorium. The Nazis knew the advancing Russian Army was very close to liberating the camp. It was clear to them that all evidence of the war-time atrocities had to be concealed, so the Germans attempted to destroy the other four crematoria themselves. Their partial ruins are preserved today.

== Legacy ==
Róża Robota's memory lives on, in the naming of the Roza Robota Gates at Montefiore Randwick (Sydney, Australia). This initiative was made possible by Sam Spitzer, a resistance fighter during World War II and now a resident of Sydney. He named the gates in honour of his war-time hero, Robota, and his late wife, Margaret. Spitzer's sister was in Auschwitz with Robota.

At Yad Vashem in Jerusalem, a monument was built to honor Robota and the three other executed women. It stands in a prime location in the garden.

In the United States, the Rosa Robota Foundation, Inc., a not-for-profit educational organization in New York state has been active in the dissemination of information and has offered audio-visual presentations to student and civic groups since 1994. The Foundation also arranged a fiftieth-anniversary commemoration of the Sonderkommando Revolt at the site of a destroyed crematorium in the Auschwitz Museum.
