= Rzędziwojowice =

- Village
- Location within Poland
- Coordinates: 50°40′34″N 17°38′17″E
- Country: Poland
- Voivodeship: Opole
- County: Opole
- Gmina: Niemodlin

Rzędziwojowice (pronounced [ʐɛnd͡ʑivɔjɔˈvit͡sɛ], German: Geppersdorf) is a village in the administrative district of Gmina Niemodlin, within Opole County, Opole Voivodeship, in south-western Poland.

While many acts of brutality occurred, mortality at Geppersdorf was relatively low. Only one of the SA guards was apprehended after the war and was sentenced to death before a Polish court because of atrocities he had committed at Geppersdorf and Auschwitz. As opposed to Gross Sarne and some other RAB camps, Geppersdorf was closed in June 1945, instead of being transformed into a Schmelt camp. The inmates were dispersed to several Schmelt camps, including Blechhammer (Blachownia Śląska) and Gross Sarne (Sarny Wielkie).
